= Bloomfield House Hotel =

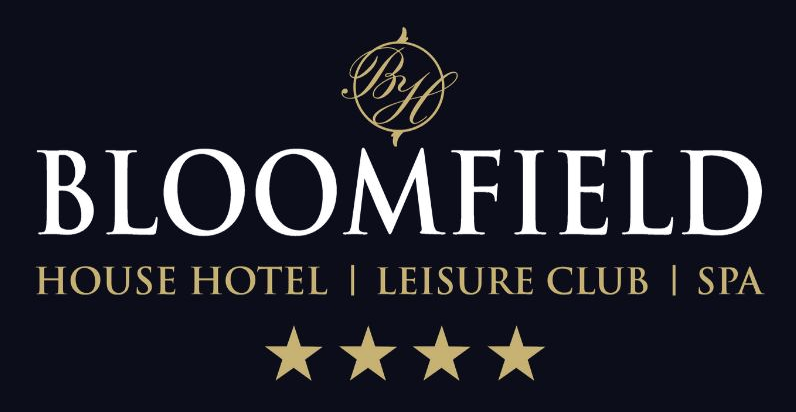
- Interactive map of the Bloomfield House Hotel area
- Former names: Bloomfield House; Bloomfield Convent
- Alternative names: Bloomfield House Hotel, Leisure Club & Spa

General information
- Type: Hotel
- Classification: 4 stars
- Location: Kilbeggan Road; Lynn; County Westmeath; N91 HP8E, Ireland
- Coordinates: 53°29′15.752″N 7°21′43.96″W
- Opened: 27 July 1979; 46 years ago
- Renovated: 2004
- Cost: £500,000 (equivalent to £2,615,091 in 2023)
- Owner: John Connaughton; Edward Reilly; Patrick A. Fitzgerald; John P. Foy

Technical details
- Grounds: 20 acres (8.1 ha)

Renovating team
- Architect: Richard Barnwell
- Structural engineer: Liam Heffernan

Other information
- Number of rooms: 111

Website
- bloomfieldhousehotel.ie

Bloomfield House Hotel is a hotel located 4.5 kilometres (2.8 mi) from Mullingar, County Westmeath, Ireland, adjacent to Mullingar Golf Club.

== History ==
=== Origins ===
The original manor house, Bloomfield House, is said to have been erected as a romantic dower house celebrating the marriage of George Rochfort, 2nd Earl of Belvedere to Dorothea “Dora” Bloomfield on 20 August 1775. George was the son of Robert Rochfort, 1st Earl of Belvedere and Mary Molesworth while Dora was the daughter of John Bloomfield and Jane Jocelyn. Dora died on 6 April 1803 aged 52 and bore no children.

In 1866, Charles Brinsley Marlay, the owner of the nearby Belvedere House, purchased the Bloomfield Estate alongside Lynnwood Estate with the intention of amalgamating both estates with Belvedere. Upon Marlay's death in 1912, his properties passed to his cousin, Charles Howard-Bury, a soldier who went on to lead his regiment in the King's Royal Rifle Corps during World War I. Following the war, Bury made Bloomfield House available to the International Committee of the Red Cross for it to be used as a hospital for soldiers injured during the war.

=== Bloomfield Convent ===
In 1932, Bury donated the property to Franciscan nuns that he had impressed from his travels. The house was then known as Bloomfield Convent from 1933, with part of it forming a school for girls. The convent later closed in mid 1977 due to a fall-off in vocations. In February 1985, the old bell from the convent was relocated to a Catholic parish in Ghana.

=== Bloomfield House Hotel ===
By June 1977, representatives of the Midland Regional Tourism Board reportedly said that a new hotel at the former convent site would be a welcome addition for the town as the Lake County Hotel had stopped offering accommodation with the loss of 30 rooms before bringing the number of available rooms in the town to 41 from more than 70. In September, two businessmen Edward Reilly and John Foy, both from Mullingar, attended a meeting with Westmeath County Council regarding changing the use of the convent school to a hotel and for the construction of an additional 22 houses on the site and they were unanimously given planning permission but the housing development was objected. Two more businessmen, John Connaughton and Patrick A. Fitzgerald joined the team behind the new hotel.

A year later, in September 1978, Bloomfield Hotel Ltd was given a green light for the construction of a hotel and 22 houses at Bloomfield and the planning section of Westmeath County Council had no objections for the hotel but did for the 22 houses planned. An Bord Pleanála stated that they had heard objections to the housing development plan from the Arts Council and from a person in Wexford.

On 13 May 1979, Pat Heavey, the managing director of the new hotel, stated that the premises was to open in the next few months as the Bloomfield House Hotel. The hotel officially opened on Friday, 27 July 1979 with a total cost of £500,000 (equivalent to £2,615,091 in 2023) providing accommodation for 120 people and having banqueting facilities for 300. At the time of opening, the hotel had 34 double bedrooms with more planned to be added.

In February 1997, work began on a £3 million (equivalent to £5,659,718 in 2023) extension adding an additional 32 bedrooms to the hotel bringing the total to 65 as well as the construction of a state of the art leisure centre designed by Fewer McGinley and Associates of Waterford which included a 20m swimming pool, hot tub and sauna as well as sunbeds. The new extension, including the leisure club, opened in March 1998.

Renovations began in March 2004 which included work on the lobby, bar, restaurant and bedrooms with Richard Barnwell as architect and Liam Heffernan of O'Reilly Stuart Structural Engineers as the structural engineer on the project. This also included the construction of a new carvery and 46 new bedrooms bringing the total bedroom count in the hotel to 111.
