= 1892 Chelmsford by-election =

UK Parliamentary by-election

The 1892 Chelmsford by-election was a parliamentary by-election held for the British House of Commons constituency of Chelmsford in Essex on 30 April 1892. The seat had become vacant on the death of the Conservative Member of Parliament William Beadel, who had held the seat since its creation for the 1885 general election.

The Conservative candidate, Thomas Usborne, was returned unopposed, and held the seat until he stood down at the 1900 general election.

== See also ==
- Chelmsford (UK Parliament constituency)
- 1908 Chelmsford by-election
- 1926 Chelmsford by-election
- 1945 Chelmsford by-election
- The town of Chelmsford
- List of United Kingdom by-elections
