= Orwell Park =

Former estate in Nacton, Suffolk, England

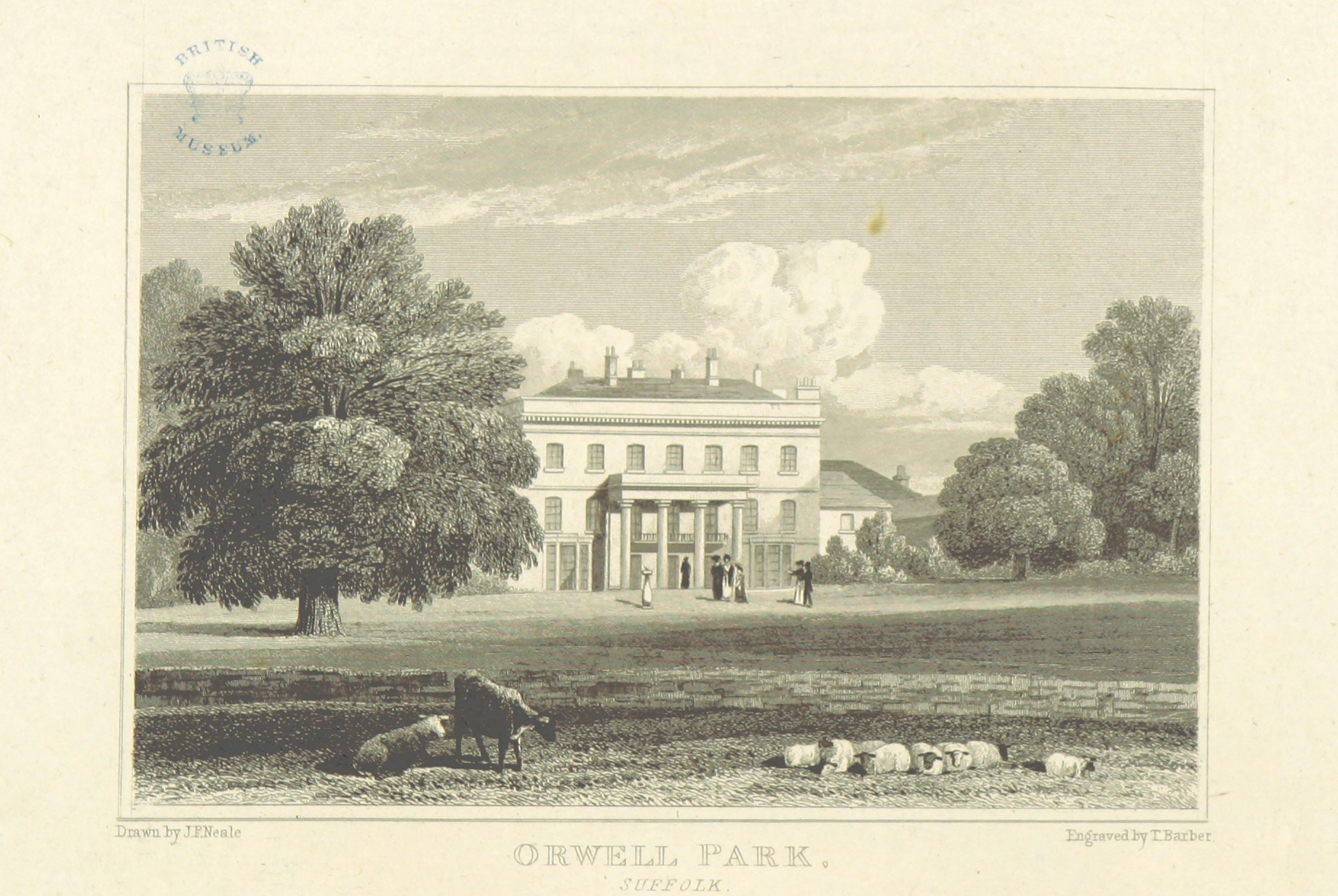
Orwell Park, John Preston Neale, 1818. This building was replaced by George Tomline

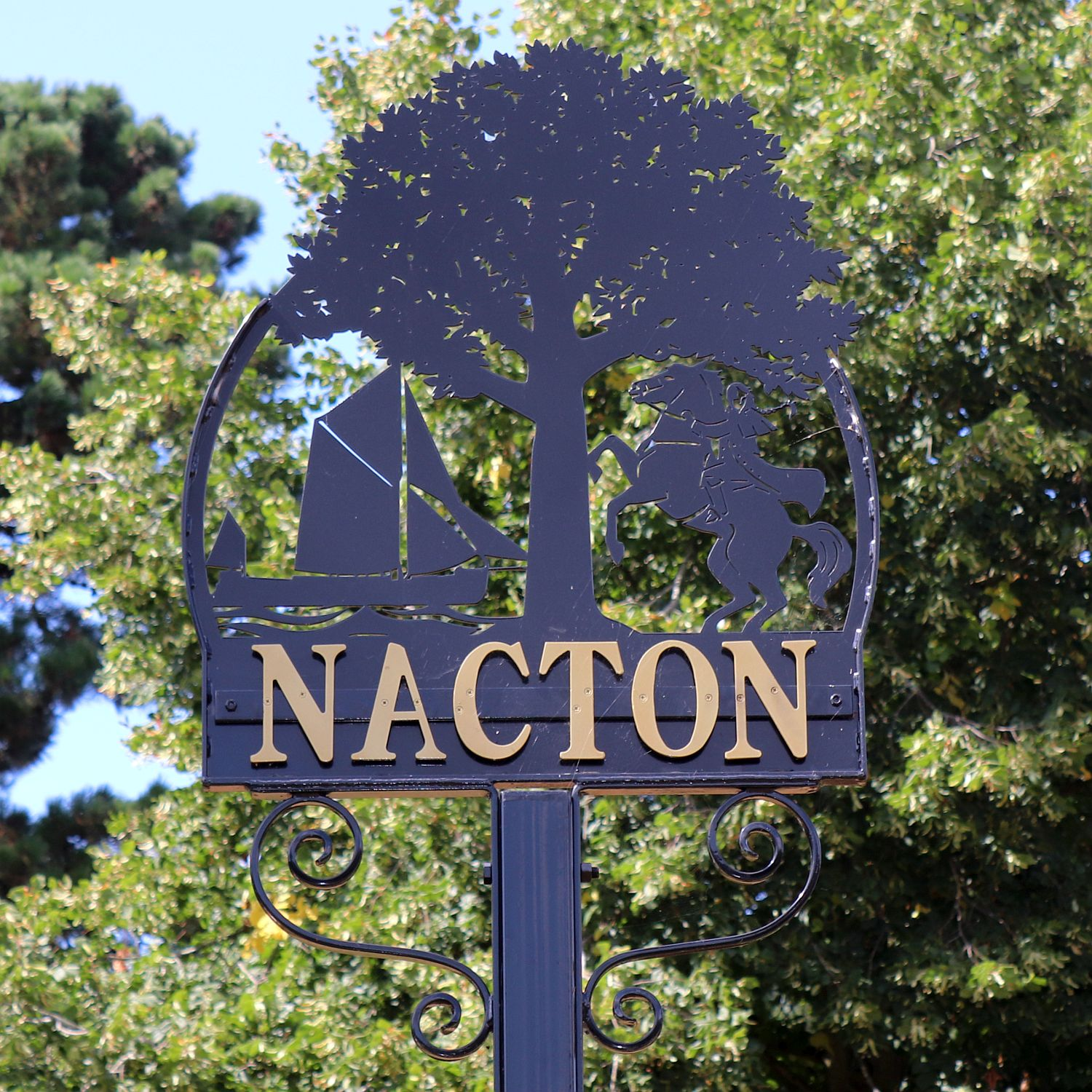
Nacton Village Sign

Orwell Park was an estate in the village of Nacton in Suffolk developed by Edward Vernon, who lived there from 1725 until he died in the mansion on 30 October 1757. It was further developed by George Tomline during the late nineteenth century. It has been the premises for Orwell Park School since 1936. In contains several Grade II listed buildings.

== Vernon family period ==
Francis Vernon, his cousin, inherited the estate and he rebuilt the mansion. He also expanded the estate with additional land for an extensive deer park. Thus the estate was known as Orwell Deer Park, or, more simply, Orwell Park. Following his death in 1783, the mansion was bequeathed to his nephew, John Vernon (1776-1818). Upon his death the estate was inherited by his sister, Arethusa (1777-1860), wife of Sir Robert Harland, 2nd Baronet (1765–1848).

== George Tomline period ==
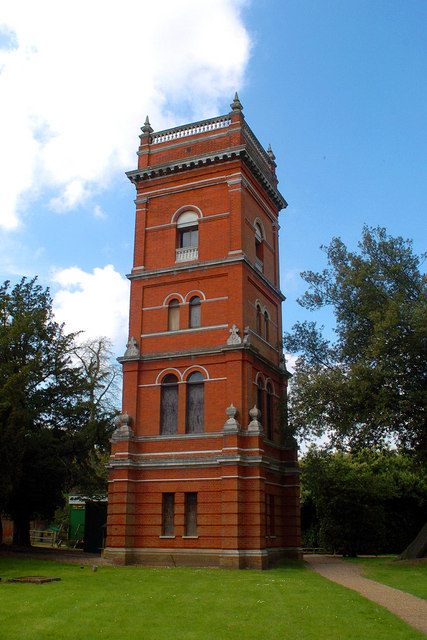
Water Tower, built in 1868 by John Macvicar Anderson and in use until early 21st century

George Tomline (1813-1889) bought the estate following the death of Sir Robert Harland in 1848. He made substantial additions to the buildings of the estate, employing John Macvicar Anderson as architect.

=== Water Tower ===
The water tower is a grade II listed building. It was completed in 1873 and is situated 50 metres to the west of the main school building. It is composed of 4 stages and is in total about 20 metres high. The brickwork of the base stage has banded rustication angle-buttresses at the corners, each displaying an urn finial. The second stage sports paired blind windows with semicircular heads. The corners feature less prominent angle-buttresses with fleur-de-lys finials. The third stage has more but smaller paired windows and the buttresses are here clasped. At the fourth stage there is a single large window featuring a balustrade. At the top there is a parapet with open balustrading and obelisk finials at each corner.

=== Observatory ===
The observatory came into use in the summer of 1874. It primarily contains a 10-inch (254mm) aperture equatorially-mounted refracting telescope. A 3-inch (76mm) aperture refractor mounted as a transit instrument forms a secondary telescope. The engineer for the construction project was the Astronomer Royal Sir George Airy’s son Wilfrid Airy (1836-1925), and the architect was again John Macvicar Anderson (1835-1915). John Isaac Plummer (1845-1925) was employed as an astronomer by Tomline until the time of his death in 1889. Annual reports of work carried out at the observatory were submitted to the Royal Astronomical Society for most years in the period 1874-1889. Occasionally other reports were issued.

These two projects, along with the construction of the Felixstowe branch railway (which started running in May 1877) could have been Tomline’s attempt to provide local relief to the long depression.

== Pretyman family period ==
After George Tomline's death in 1889, the estate was inherited by Ernest George Pretyman. Pretyman was elected member of parliament for the local constituency of Woodbridge, defeating the liberal candidate Robert Lacey Everett. After Everett regained the seat in 1906 Pretyman held the parliamentary seat of Chelmsford from 1908 until 1923. This enabled him to continue his political career.

After Ernest's death in 1931, the estate was inherited by his eldest son George Pretyman, who sold the estate in 1936.

== Orwell Park School ==
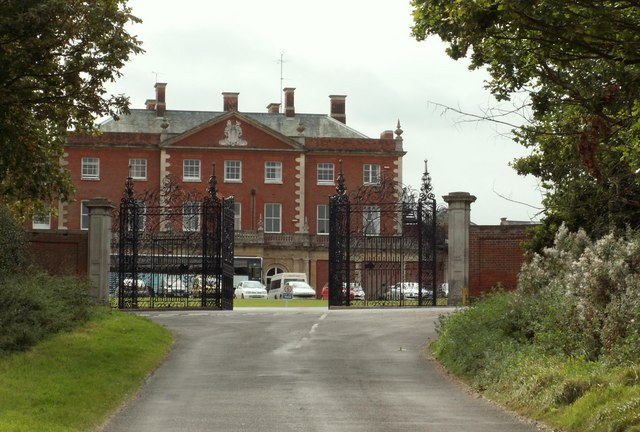
Entrance to the estate, 2007

George Pretyman sold the estate to Aldeburgh Lodge School, which renamed itself Orwell Park School. It remains the current occupier of the premises.
