= The Jealous Wall =

Folly in Ireland

- An Balla Éad
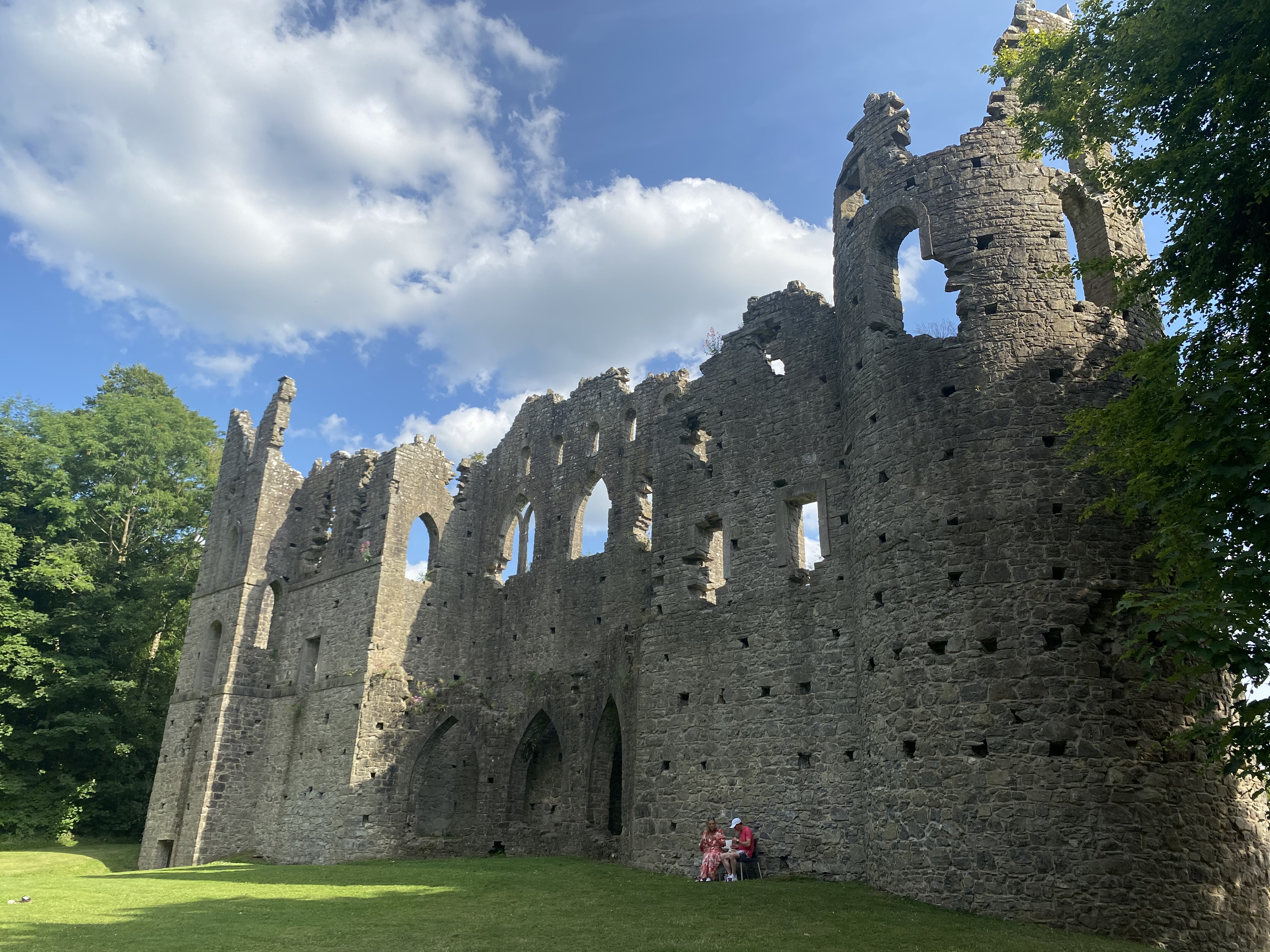
- A view of the back of the wall, 2021
- Interactive map of the The Jealous Wall area
- Alternative names: Jealousy Wall

General information
- Type: Folly
- Architectural style: Gothic
- Location: Belvedere House and Gardens, Mullingar, County Westmeath, Ireland
- Coordinates: 53°28′34.698″N 7°22′6.632″W
- Elevation: 103 metres (338 ft)
- Named for: Robert Rochfort, 1st Earl of Belvedere's jealousy of his brother, George Rochfort's new house and his wife's popularity
- Completed: 1760; 266 years ago
- Owner: Robert Rochfort, 1st Earl of Belvedere (1760—1774); George Rochfort, 2nd Earl of Belvedere (1774—1828); Brinsley Butler, 4th Earl of Lanesborough (1828—1847); Charles Brinsley Marlay (1847—1912); Charles Howard-Bury (1912—1963); Rex Beaumont (1963—1982); Westmeath County Council (1982—present)

Technical details
- Material: Limestone

The Jealous Wall is a large 18th century Gothic folly made from limestone located in the Belvedere House and Gardens in Mullingar, County Westmeath, Ireland. It is notable for being the largest folly in Ireland. It was constructed by Robert Rochfort in c. 1760.

== History ==
Robert Rochfort, 1st Earl of Belvedere, married his second wife Mary Molesworth in 1736 and lived with her and their children in their Gaulstown estate. Robert suspected his wife of having an affair with his brother, Arthur Rochfort, their nearest neighbor. Belvedere House was built in 1740, and around 1742 or 1743, Robert imprisoned Mary in their Gaulstown home with servants following her suspected affair with his brother. Mary remained imprisoned for 31 years until Robert's death in 1774.

Robert lived mainly at Belvedere House following his separation from Mary and his imprisonment of her at their Gaulstown home. In c. 1743, his other brother, George Rochfort, built a large Palladian house next door to the south. George's new mansion Tudenham Park House being better than his Belvedere House led Robert to construct the folly in c. 1760. The folly, also known as a sham ruin, is composed of rubble limestone and intentionally designed to look like a ruined abbey wall. It is unknown who designed the folly.
