= 1926 Chelmsford by-election =

UK Parliamentary by-election

The 1926 Chelmsford by-election was held on 30 November 1926. The by-election was held due to the resignation of the incumbent Conservative MP, Henry Curtis-Bennett. It was won by the Conservative candidate Charles Howard-Bury.

Chelmsford by-election, 1926 Electorate 39,652
Party	Candidate	Votes	%	±%
Conservative	Charles Howard-Bury	13,395	47.8	−6.9
Liberal	Sydney Walter Robinson	8,435	30.2	−5.1
Labour	Nils H Moller	6,140	22.0	+12.0
Majority		4,960	17.6	−1.8
Turnout		27,970	70.5	−6.6
Conservative hold		Swing	-0.9	
