= E. G. Pretyman =

British politician (1859–1931)

The Right Honourable E. G. Pretyman JP DL

Civil Lord of the Admiralty
- In office 1900–1903
- Preceded by: Austen Chamberlain
- Succeeded by: Arthur Lee
- In office 1916–1919
- Preceded by: The Earl of Lytton
- Succeeded by: The Earl of Lytton

Personal details
- Born: 13 November 1859
- Died: 26 November 1931 (aged 72) Nacton, Suffolk, England
- Spouse: Lady Beatrice Adine Bridgeman (m. 1894)
- Parent: Rev. Fredric Pretyman
- Occupation: Politician, soldier

Colonel Ernest George Pretyman, PC, JP, DL (13 November 1859 – 26 November 1931), known as E. G. Pretyman, was a British Conservative politician and soldier.

== Background and education ==
Born on 13 November 1859 and christened on 1 January 1860 at Great Carlton, Lincolnshire, Pretyman was the son of Reverend Frederic Pretyman, Canon of Lincoln. He was the great-grandson of George Pretyman Tomline, a prominent late 18th-century cleric, as well as the heir of "Colonel" George Tomline, his father's first cousin. He was educated at Eton and at the Royal Military Academy, Woolwich. He entered the Royal Artillery in 1880 and retired in 1889. After George Tomline's death in 1889, he inherited the Orwell Park estate in Suffolk.

== Political career ==
Pretyman served as Member of Parliament (MP) for Woodbridge, Suffolk from 1895 to 1906 and for Chelmsford from 1908 to 1923. He defeated the Liberal MP Robert Lacey Everett in 1895 and lost his seat to Everett in 1906. He was Civil Lord of the Admiralty from 1900 to 1903, Parliamentary and Financial Secretary to the Admiralty from 1903 to 1906, Parliamentary Secretary to the Board of Trade from 1915 to 1916 and Civil Lord of the Admiralty again from 1916 to 1919. He was appointed a Privy Counsellor in 1917.

E. G. Pretyman made a Gramophone Company recording of an address "On the Navy" in 1908.

== Family ==
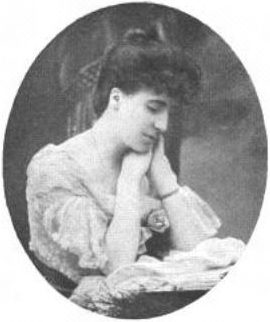
Beatrice Adine Pretyman

Pretyman married Lady Beatrice Adine Bridgeman (2 December 1870 – 27 June 1952), daughter of George Bridgeman, 4th Earl of Bradford, on 28 June 1894. They had three sons and three daughters. His most notable descendant today is Robert Gascoyne-Cecil, 7th Marquess of Salisbury, sometime Tory leader of the House of Lords in the 1990s.

- Maj. George Marcus Tomline Pretyman, of Orwell Park, Suffolk, (24 April 1895 – 1979); his only child Gillian (who married Mark Bence-Jones) inherited the family papers.
- Lt. Cmdr. Herbert Ernest Pretyman, R.N., of Newbury, Berkshire (19 June 1900 – 1987); twice married, with children by both marriages
- Sir Walter Frederic Pretyman, of Campos, Brazil (17 October 1901 – 1987), who emigrated to Brazil 1924, and was appointed KBE 1967. His second wife Vera de Sa Sottomaior was former wife of Randal Plunkett, 19th Lord Dunsany and mother of the 20th Lord Dunsany. Sir Walter Pretyman was twice married, and had children by both marriages.
- Ida Beatrice Pretyman (5 April 1896 – 1977), who married Captain Charles Wilfrid Lindley Meynell, a grandson of Charles Wood, 1st Viscount Halifax, and left children.
- Marjorie Elizabeth Pretyman (1 May 1897 – 6 May 1969), who married Capt. Hon. Valentine Maurice Wyndham-Quin, R.N., of Chieveley, Berkshire. They were parents of three daughters, including Marjorie "Mollie" Wyndham-Quin, widow of the 6th Marquess of Salisbury and mother of the present Marquess, formerly styled Viscount Cranbourne, sometime Tory leader of the House of Lords in the 1990s. Another grandson is the biographer Max Egremont.
- Katharine Louise Pretyman (1907– ?), who married Lt.-Col. Charles Algernon Peel and left children.

E. G. Pretyman died at Orwell Park on 26 November 1931.

== Notes ==
Parliament of the United Kingdom
Preceded by Robert Lacey Everett	Member of Parliament for Woodbridge; 1895–1906	Succeeded by Robert Lacey Everett
Preceded by Sir Carne Rasch, Bt	Member of Parliament for Chelmsford; 1908–1923	Succeeded by Sydney Robinson
Political offices
Preceded by Austen Chamberlain	Civil Lord of the Admiralty; 1900–1903	Succeeded by Arthur Lee
Preceded by H. O. Arnold-Forster	Parliamentary and Financial Secretary to the Admiralty; 1903–1905	Succeeded by Edmund Robertson
Preceded by J. M. Robertson	Parliamentary Secretary to the Board of Trade; 1915–1916	Succeeded by George Henry Roberts
Preceded by The Earl of Lytton	Civil Lord of the Admiralty; 1916–1919	Succeeded by The Earl of Lytton
