= West Chelmsford =

UK Parliament constituency (1997–2010)

Coordinates: 51.76°N 0.44°E

- Former county constituency for the House of Commons
- Boundary of West Chelmsford in Essex for the 2005 general election

- Location of Essex within England
- County: Essex
- Major settlements: Chelmsford

1997–2010
- Seats: One
- Created from: Chelmsford
- Replaced by: Chelmsford

West Chelmsford was a parliamentary constituency represented in the House of Commons of the Parliament of the United Kingdom. From 1997 to 2010 it elected one Member of Parliament (MP) by the first past the post system of election.

== History ==
This seat was created for the 1997 general election from parts of the abolished Chelmsford constituency, together with areas transferred from Braintree. It was abolished at the next redistribution which came into effect for the 2010 general election, when the Chelmsford seat was re-established.

It was a safe Conservative seat throughout its existence.

== Boundaries ==
The Borough of Chelmsford wards of All Saints, Boreham, Broomfield, Pleshey and Great Waltham, Cathedral, Chignall, Good Easter, Mashbury, Highwood and Roxwell, Goat Hall, Great and Little Leighs and Little Waltham, Margaretting and Stock, Moulsham Lodge, Old Moulsham, Patching Hall, St. Andrews, Springfield North, Springfield South, The Lawns, Waterhouse Farm and Writtle.

The seat took in northern and western parts of the abolished constituency of Chelmsford including by far the majority of the city itself. It also included rural areas extending as far north as Great Leighs, the Walthams and Good Easter, which had previously been part of the Braintree constituency.

At the 2010 general election, a newly re-created Chelmsford constituency (now a Borough Constituency) succeeded this seat. Rural wards from this constituency mainly joined the Saffron Walden constituency, with a small area around Margaretting becoming part of the Maldon constituency.

== Members of Parliament ==
Election	Member	Party
1997	Simon Burns	Conservative
2010	Constituency abolished: see Chelmsford and Saffron Walden	

== Elections ==
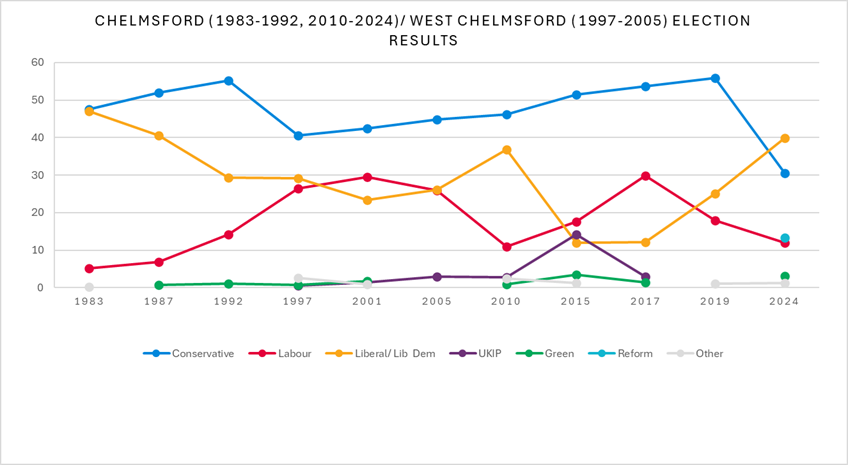
Chelmsford/Chelmsford West election results 1983–2024

=== Elections in the 1990s ===
General election 1997: West Chelmsford
Party	Candidate	Votes	%	±%
Conservative	Simon Burns	23,781	40.6	
Liberal Democrats	Martin Bracken	17,090	29.2	
Labour	Roy Chad	15,463	26.4	
Referendum	Terence Smith	1,536	2.6	
Green	George Rumens	411	0.7	
UKIP	Martin Levin	323	0.6	
Majority		6,691	11.4	
Turnout		58,577	76.8	
Conservative win (new seat)				

=== Elections in the 2000s ===
General election 2001: West Chelmsford
Party	Candidate	Votes	%	±%
Conservative	Simon Burns	20,446	42.5	+1.9
Labour	Adrian Longden	14,185	29.5	+3.1
Liberal Democrats	Stephen Robinson	11,197	23.3	−5.9
Green	Ms. Eleanor Burgess	837	1.7	+1.0
UKIP	Ken Wedon	693	1.4	+0.8
Legalise Cannabis	Herb Philbin	442	0.9	New
Majority		6,261	13.0	+1.6
Turnout		47,800	61.2	−15.3
Conservative hold		Swing		

General election 2005: West Chelmsford
Party	Candidate	Votes	%	±%
Conservative	Simon Burns	22,946	44.9	+2.4
Liberal Democrats	Stephen Robinson	13,326	26.1	+2.8
Labour	Russell Kennedy	13,236	25.9	−3.6
UKIP	Ken Wedon	1,544	3.0	+1.6
Majority		9,620	18.8	+5.8
Turnout		51,052	61.9	+0.4
Conservative hold		Swing	−0.2	

== See also ==
- List of parliamentary constituencies in Essex
