= Derek Curtis-Bennett =

British barrister (1904–1956)

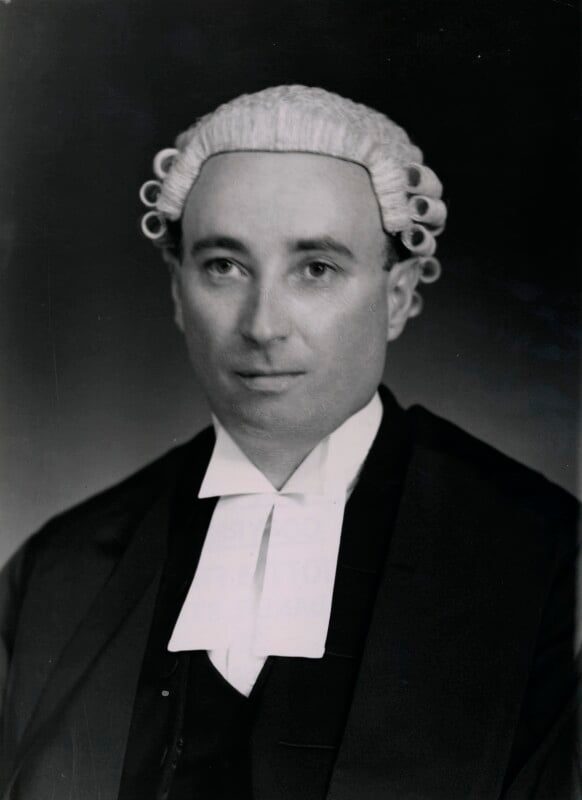
Curtis-Bennett in 1943

Frederick Henry Derek Curtis-Bennett, QC (29 February 1904 – July 1956) was a British barrister who defended some of the most notorious characters in British legal history, but whose career was cut short by alcoholism. His father was Sir Henry Curtis-Bennett KC, whose biography he wrote with Roland Wild.

== Early life and career ==
Curtis-Bennett was educated at Radley College and Trinity College, Cambridge. He was called to the bar in 1926 and specialised in criminal defence. He became Recorder of Guildford in 1942 and a King's Counsel the following year. Among those that Curtis-Bennett defended were William Joyce (Lord Haw Haw), serial killer John Christie (1953), Sergeant Frederick Emmett-Dunne, atom spy Klaus Fuchs, and Burmese politician U Saw. Curtis-Bennett pursued the truth in the Christie case as his client admitted more and more murders, despite it being injurious to his defence.

== Family ==
Curtis-Bennett married Margaret Duncan in 1928, which marriage was dissolved in 1949. There were three children. He married Janet Farquhar in 1955, who killed herself in 1956.

== Death ==
Curtis-Bennett died from asphyxiation after collapsing while highly intoxicated. He was discovered at his home in Courtfield Gardens, Earls Court, London, on 23 July 1956. Following medical evidence showing considerable liver damage, the coroner commented that the verdict "must be one of alcoholism". Curtis-Bennett died just two months after his wife, Janet Farquhar Curtis-Bennett (aged 26), killed herself with a drug overdose. It was stated at Janet's inquest that relations between her and her husband had been troubled.

== Selected publications ==
- "Curtis." The life of Sir Henry Curtis-Bennett, K.C. London, Cassell & Co., 1937. (With Roland Wild)
