= Henry Curtis-Bennett =

English barrister and politician (1879–1936)

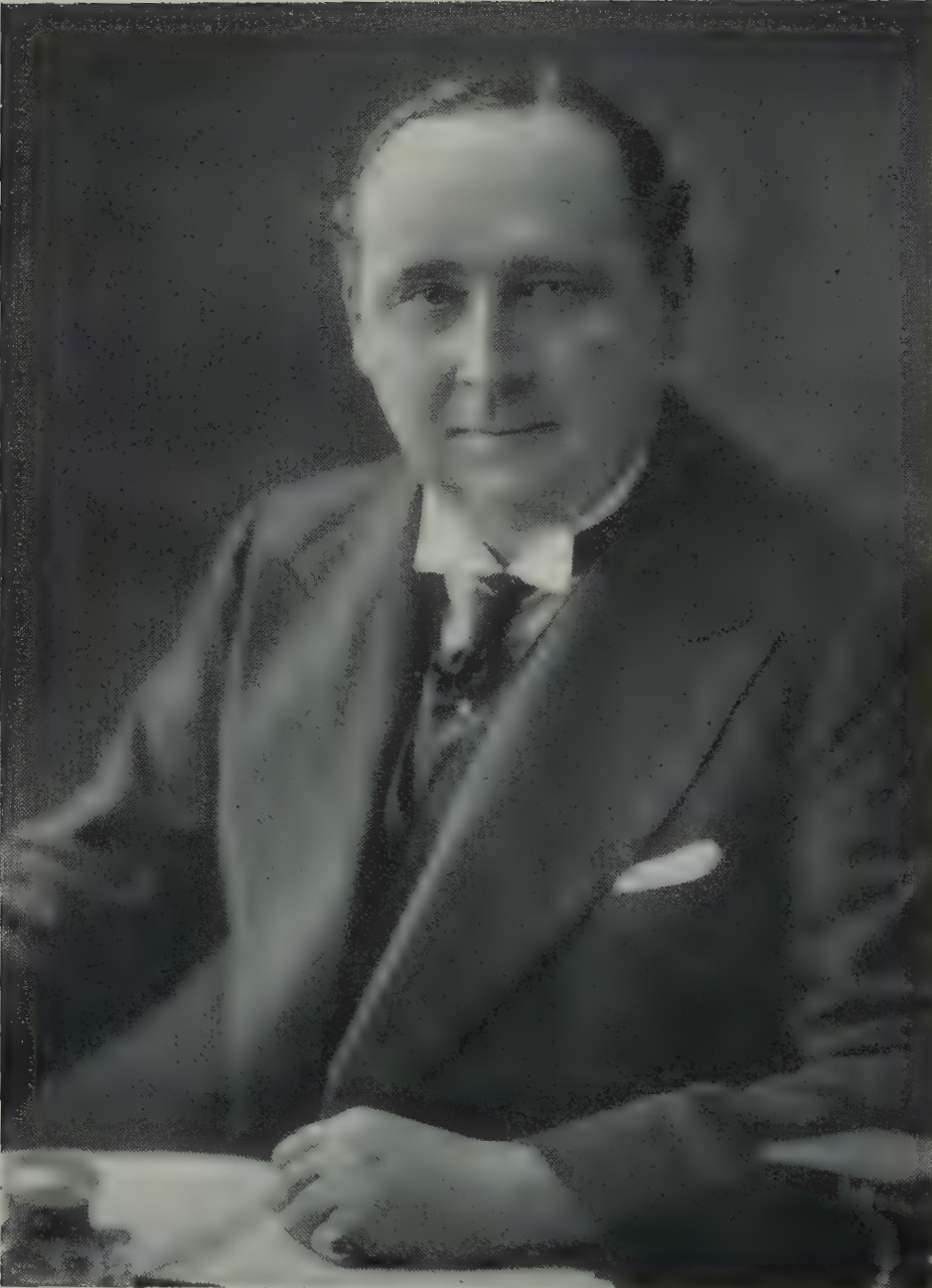
- Sir Henry Honywood Curtis-Bennett, KC

Member of Parliament for Chelmsford
- In office 29 October 1924 – 4 November 1926
- Preceded by: Sydney Robinson
- Succeeded by: Charles Howard-Bury

Personal details
- Born: 31 July 1879 Brentwood, Essex
- Died: 2 November 1936 (aged 57)
- Party: Conservative

Sir Henry Honywood Curtis-Bennett, KC (31 July 1879 – 2 November 1936) was an English barrister and Conservative Party politician. As a barrister, he led the defence in the 1922 cases of Herbert Rowse Armstrong and of Edith Thompson and Frederick Bywaters. As a politician, he was the member of parliament (MP) for Chelmsford from 1924 to 1926.

== Life and career ==
Henry Honywood Curtis-Bennett was born at Brentwood, Essex, the son of Sir Henry Curtis-Bennett, Chief Metropolitan Magistrate. His younger brother was the civil servant and sports administrator Sir Noel Curtis-Bennett. He was educated at Radley College and Trinity College, Cambridge, and was called to the bar by the Middle Temple in 1902.

Unable to serve during the First World War on health grounds, Curtis-Bennett defended several accused spies, before being engaged by the War Office to cross-examine suspected spies, including Mata Hari. He became a KC in 1919 and was knighted in 1922 for his wartime work.

He was Conservative Member of Parliament (MP) for Chelmsford from 1924 to 1926, when he resigned due to his wife suing for divorce. He was a "fashionable silk" who was often engaged in high-profile criminal cases, which earned him much press coverage.

Among his famous cases were his defence of Mrs Edith Thompson in the Thompson and Bywaters murder case (1922), of solicitor Herbert Rowse Armstrong, hanged for the murder of his wife (1922), of Ronald True for murder (1922), of Jean-Pierre Vaquier for murder (1924) and of Lord De Clifford for manslaughter (1935), the last trial of a peer by the House of Lords. On the prosecution side, he prosecuted Patrick Mahon for murder (1924) and Norman Thorne for murder (1925). On the civil side, he appeared as counsel in front of the Select Committee of the House of Lords on the Women's Royal Air Force in 1918 and 1919.

He was deputy chairman of the Essex quarter sessions from 1923 to 1925 and chairman from 1935 to 1936, as well as Recorder of Chelmsford from 1929 to 1935. In 1936, he became the full-time Chairman of the County of London Sessions, to general surprise. In November that year, he died while addressing a dinner of the National Greyhound Racing Society at the Dorchester Hotel in London.

His son, Derek, from his first marriage also became a noted barrister, the third generation of the family to achieve legal distinction.

== In popular culture ==
Curtis-Bennett was portrayed by Charles Kay in the 1980s Granada Television series Lady Killers.

Parliament of the United Kingdom
Preceded by Sydney Robinson	Member of Parliament for Chelmsford; 1924 – 1926	Succeeded by Charles Howard-Bury
