= Tudenham Park House =

Ruined Palladian house in County Westmeath, Ireland

- Teach Tudenham
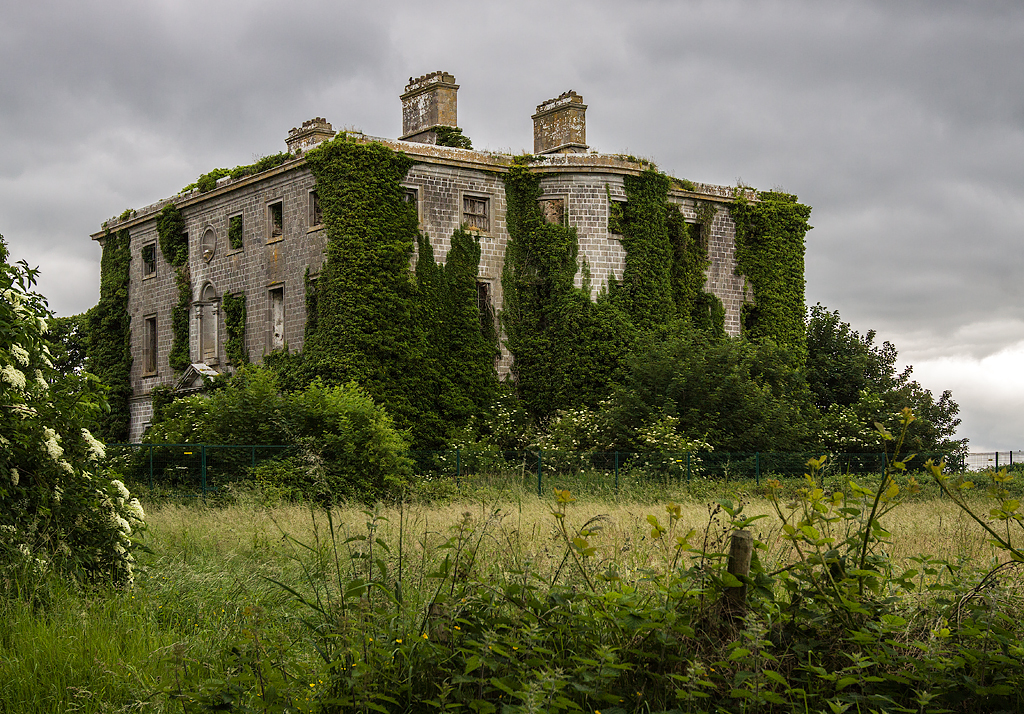
- A view of the house, 2016
- Interactive map of the Tudenham Park House area
- Former names: Rochfort House

General information
- Architectural style: Palladian
- Location: Rochfort Demesne, Mullingar, County Westmeath, Ireland, Ireland
- Coordinates: 53°28′20.385″N 7°22′16.875″W
- Elevation: 92 metres (302 ft)
- Construction started: 1717
- Completed: 1742; 284 years ago
- Renovated: 1790
- Destroyed: 1958
- Owner: Rochfort family (1742—1835); Francis Hopkins (1836—1870); Tottenham family (1870—1963)

Technical details
- Material: limestone

Design and construction
- Architect: Richard Cassels

Tudenham Park House (Irish: Teach Tudenham), originally called Rochfort House, is an 18th-century Palladian limestone country house located in Tudenham Park on the Rochfort Demesne near Belvedere House and Gardens beside Lough Ennell, County Westmeath, Ireland.

The house is known for being involved in an ordeal with Robert Rochfort's brother, George, which resulted in Robert constructing The Jealous Wall so he would not have to look at his brother's grander house.

== History ==
The construction on the house began in 1717, and it was completed in 1742 for George Rochfort.

Later a glass house designed by Richard Turner was affixed to the property.

It was purchased by Sir Francis Hopkins in 1836, and the name was subsequently changed from Rochfort to Tudenham Park. Hopkins' tenure lasted 34 years until the property was sold to the affluent Tottenham family in 1870.

On 7 March 1906, Charles Gore Loftus Tottenham inherited Tudenham House and land from his grandmother.

The house was used as a hospital and convalescent home for army officers during World War I and World War II and was still in military possession in 1945.

The Tottenham family had not lived in the property since 1952; and in 1958 the house was gutted by a fire that destroyed the roof but spared the walls, chimneystacks and main façade, which still stand to this day. The family decided to sell the house ruin and land in 1963.

As of 2023, the house is largely covered with overgrown vegetation, and multiple efforts have been made to conserve the property since 2005.

=== Sale of the property ===
In December 2013, the land, including the house, was sold at an auction for €681,000 to a businessman from County Westmeath.

In October 2023, the property again went on the market with a guide price of €1.2m.

== Gallery ==
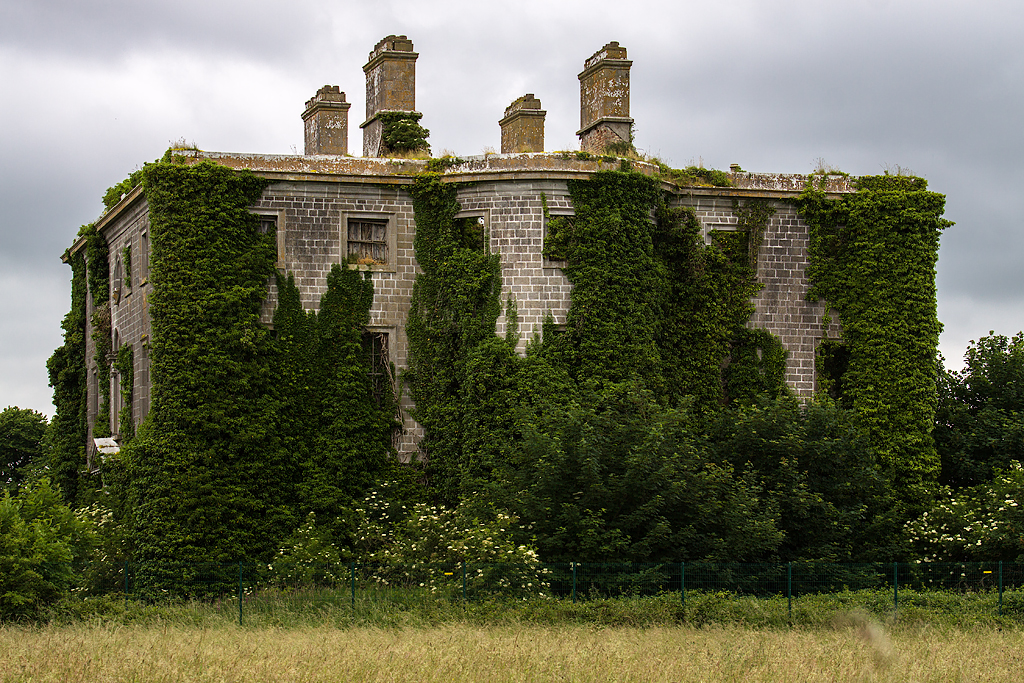
Tudenham House

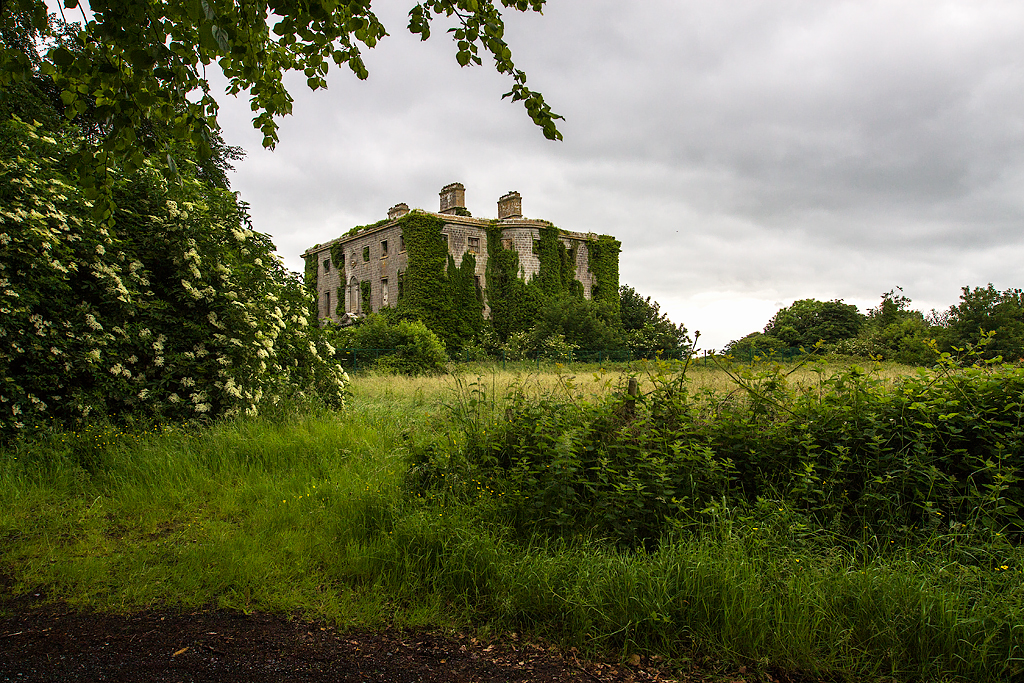
View from the south

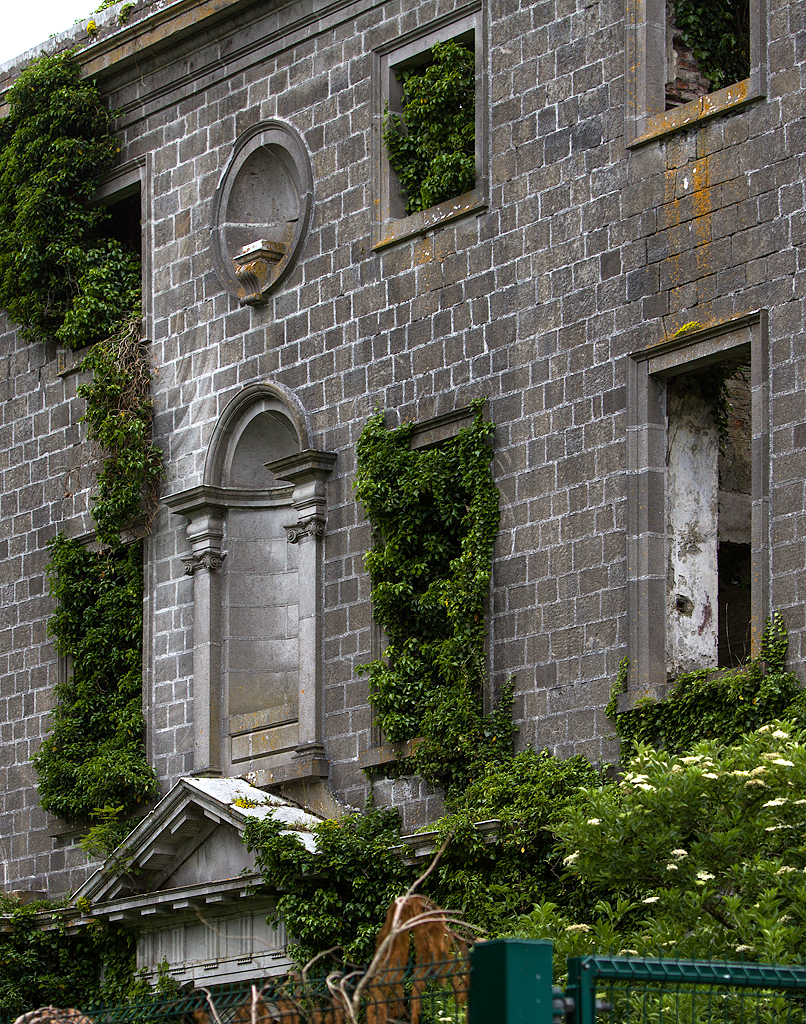
Architectural detail of the south elevation
