= Simon Burns =

British Conservative politician (born 1952)

The Right Honourable Sir Simon Burns
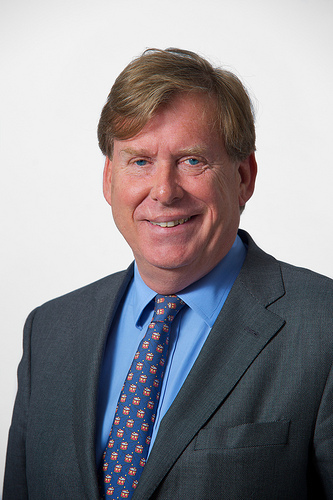

Minister of State for Rail and Aviation
- In office 4 September 2012 – 4 October 2013
- Prime Minister: David Cameron
- Preceded by: Theresa Villiers
- Succeeded by: The Baroness Kramer

Minister of State for Health Services
- In office 12 May 2010 – 4 September 2012
- Prime Minister: David Cameron
- Preceded by: Mike O'Brien
- Succeeded by: Dan Poulter

Lord Commissioner of the Treasury
- In office 5 July 1995 – 23 July 1996
- Prime Minister: John Major
- Preceded by: Timothy Kirkhope
- Succeeded by: Roger Knapman

Member of Parliament for Chelmsford West Chelmsford (1997–2010)
- In office 11 June 1987 – 3 May 2017
- Preceded by: Norman St John-Stevas
- Succeeded by: Vicky Ford

Personal details
- Born: 6 September 1952 (age 73) Nottingham, England
- Party: Conservative
- Spouse: Emma Clifford (m. 1982; div. 2000)
- Children: 2
- Education: Worcester College, Oxford
- Website: Official website parliament..simon-burns

Sir Simon Hugh McGuigan Burns (born 6 September 1952) is a British politician, who served as Member of Parliament (MP) for Chelmsford since being elected at the 1987 general election until the 2017 general election.

Burns resigned from being Minister of State for Transport in October 2013 to stand in the First Deputy Chairmen of Ways and Means by-election following the resignation of Deputy Speaker Nigel Evans.

Returned to Parliament as a Conservative MP in the 2015 election, he was knighted in the 2015 Birthday Honours. Burns announced in January 2016 that he would not be standing at the next general election, reaffirmed when the 2017 general election was declared.

== Early life and education ==
Born on 6 September 1952 in Nottingham, Burns was educated at Christ the King School in Accra, then Stamford School in Lincolnshire, before going up to Worcester College, Oxford, to read Modern History, graduating with a BA (Hons) (Third-class honours, resulting in his nickname "third degree burns") in 1975. He has also received an Honorary Doctorate of Philosophy (Hon. PhD) from Anglia Ruskin University.

Burns cites following the Kennedy administration in the early 1960s as the point where he became interested in politics, saying "As you looked around the world you had a prime minister in Britain who was about 69, a president in France in his mid-70s and a chancellor in West Germany in his 80s. [Kennedy] had a glamorous family, and conveyed the impression that you could actually do something in politics to improve the lives of citizens. I thought that was cool, and decided that public service would be fantastic".

== Political career ==
Before beginning his degree at Oxford, Burns spent nine months in the United States working for Senator George McGovern's ultimately unsuccessful presidential campaign against President Richard Nixon in 1972. Following the Watergate scandal and Nixon's subsequent resignation in 1974, Burns would comment that McGovern's campaign had "won the argument, even if we lost the vote".

From 1975 to 1980, Burns was political adviser to Rt Hon Sally Oppenheim (now Baroness Oppenheim-Barnes). From 1980 to 1983 he was a journalist and served as a director of What To Buy for Business magazine, before working from 1983 to 1987 for the Institute of Directors Policy Executive.

Burns has been active in domestic politics since 1970, when he was a founder member of the Rutland and Stamford Young Conservatives, having been founding chairman of Stamford School CPC. From 1973 to 1975, he was a committee member, Political Action Officer and Secretary of Oxford University Conservative Association, and a member of the Oxford Union. From 1977 to 1981, he was Treasurer for Southfields Ward and an executive council member of Putney Conservative Association.

In 1983, he was the Conservative Party candidate in Alyn and Deeside (Flintshire, Wales) where he reduced Labour's majority from 6,800 to 1,368. In 1986, he was elected Chairman of Avonmore Ward, Fulham Conservative Association.

Burns was sworn of the Privy Council in February 2011.

Burns was opposed to Brexit prior to the 2016 referendum. In 2013 Burns voted against the Marriage (Same Sex Couples) Bill.

=== Election results ===
At the 2005 general election, Burns gained 22,946 votes (44.9%) and a majority of 9,620 (18.8%). The number of votes cast for Burns in 2005 was an increase of 2.4% from the previous general election in 2001. His majority also increased from 6,261 to 9,620. Turnout was 61.9%, down from 62.5% in 2001. At the 2010 general election, Burns gained 25,207 votes (46.2%), winning a majority over the Liberal Democrat candidate by 5,110 (9.4%).

At the 2015 general election, Burns gained 27,732 votes (51.5%), winning the seat with a majority over Chris Vince, the Labour candidate, of 18,250 (33.9%).

== Controversies ==
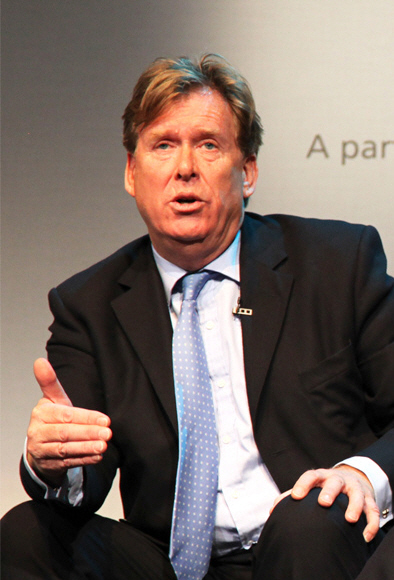
Simon Burns MP in 2010

In 2007, Burns persuaded the House of Commons Administration Committee, then being a member, that parliamentarians should have "priority access" to services within the Parliamentary Estate. In practice, this meant that MPs and Peers could avoid queues for shops, restaurants, bars, computers, photocopiers and even toilets by "pushing in" ahead of visitors or staff. The so-called "queue jumping rule" provoked cross-party opposition from Commons staff and other MPs but Burns trenchantly defended the proposal.

On 3 April 2008, Burns was involved in a collision with a cyclist as he drove his 4x4 out of the Palace of Westminster gates into Parliament Square. The cyclist, British Army Major Stuart Lane, was thrown over the handlebars of his bicycle and broke two vertebrae in his neck "which could have hindered his Army career". In February 2009 Burns pleaded guilty to a charge of careless driving and was fined £400 with £200 costs at the City of Westminster Magistrates' Court.

On 29 June 2010, Burns called Speaker of the House of Commons John Bercow, who stands at 5'6", a "stupid, sanctimonious dwarf" during a debate.

In November 2011, Burns compared members of the campaigning group 38 Degrees to zombies, which led to an open letter of complaint to Burns with over 85,000 signatures.

In January 2013, Burns, when the minister overseeing rail fares, was revealed as having been making use of a ministerial car instead of travelling the 35 miles from his home in Essex to London by train. He claimed this was because he was not allowed to read sensitive papers on the train, but his claim was immediately contradicted by the Cabinet Office, although it was conceded that reading Red box matters in such an environment was not advisable. The cost to the taxpayer was estimated to be £80,000 per annum.

== Personal life ==
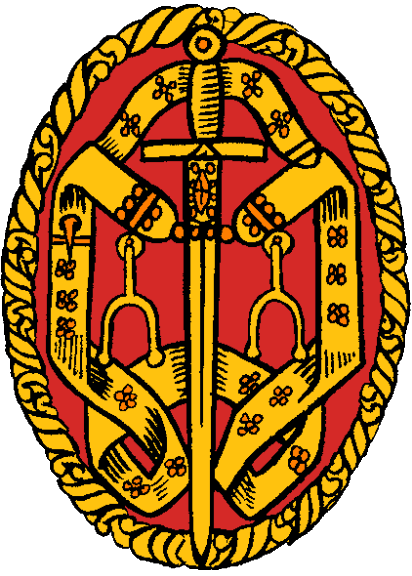
Knight Bachelor insigne

Burns was married to Emma Burns (née Clifford) from 1982 until their divorce in 2000; they have two children.

He is a second cousin of David Bowie.

In the Queen's Birthday Honours 2015, Sir Simon was appointed a Knight Bachelor "for parliamentary and political service".

Despite his conservative views, Burns is a "proud" supporter of the more liberal-leaning U.S. Democratic Party. Citing the big tent nature of American political parties, he argues "You can't just say that, because you’re a British Conservative, so you have to be a [U.S.] Republican. American politics isn’t contained in that way. Turn the clock back to the 1970s, and the Democrat Party went from the liberal Kennedy wing right through to the out-and-out racists in the Southern states. The Republican Party had its liberal wing – people like John Lindsay, Chuck Percy and Nelson Rockefeller."

Parliament of the United Kingdom
Preceded by Norman St John-Stevas	Member of Parliament for Chelmsford; 1987–1997	Constituency abolished; recreated in 2010
New constituency	Member of Parliament for Chelmsford West; 1997–2010	Constituency abolished
New constituency	Member of Parliament for Chelmsford; 2010–2017	Succeeded by Vicky Ford
