= Thomas Usborne =

Usborne in 1895.

Thomas Usborne (30 May 1840 – 7 June 1915) was an English Conservative Party politician. He was born in Limerick and studied successively at Harrow School and at Trinity College, Cambridge, where he obtained an MA degree.

He was elected to the House of Commons as the Member of Parliament (MP) for the Chelmsford Division of Essex at an unopposed by-election in 1892, following the death of the sitting MP William Beadel. Usborne was re-elected at the general election in July 1892, and held the seat until he stood down at the 1900 general election. His son, also called Thomas, was a first-class cricketer.

Parliament of the United Kingdom
Preceded by William Beadel	Member of Parliament for Chelmsford; 1892 – 1900	Succeeded by Sir Carne Rasch
