= Thomas Usborne (cricketer) =

English cricketer

Personal information
- Full name: Thomas Masters Usborne
- Born: 11 December 1866; Surbiton, Surrey, England
- Died: 1 February 1952 (aged 85); Chilham, Kent, England
- Batting: Right-handed
- Role: Wicket-keeper

Domestic team information
- Years: Team
- 1892/93–1899/1900: Europeans
- 1892/93: Bombay

Career statistics
Competition	First-class
Matches	5
Runs scored	109
Batting average	13.62
100s/50s	–/–
Top score	41*
Catches/stumpings	4/3
- Source: Cricinfo, 24 November 2022

Thomas Masters Usborne (11 December 1866 — 1 February 1952) was an English first-class cricketer and British Army officer.

The son of the politician Thomas Usborne, he was born at Surbiton in December 1866. He was educated at Haileybury, where he played for the cricket eleven and represented the college in racquets. From Haileybury, he attended the Royal Military Academy, Woolwich. He graduated from there as a lieutenant into the Royal Artillery in February 1886, with promotion to captain following a decade later in September 1896. In the 1890s, Usborne served in British India, where he played first-class cricket. He made four appearances for the Europeans cricket team in the Bombay Presidency Match from 1892 to 1899, in addition to making a single appearance for Bombay against Lord Hawke's XI. Playing as a wicket-keeper, he scored 109 runs in his five first-class matches, at an average of 13.62 and with a highest score of 41 not out; behind the stumps he took four catches and made three stumpings. In the Royal Artillery, he was promoted to major in October 1901, and later retired from active service in August 1913. Usborne died in February 1952 at Chilham, Kent.
