= William Beadel =

William James Beadel (1828 – 5 April 1892) was a British Conservative Party politician.

He was elected at the 1885 general election as member of parliament (MP) for the newly created Chelmsford Division of Essex, and held the seat until his death in 1892, aged 79.

Parliament of the United Kingdom
New constituency	Member of Parliament for Chelmsford; 1885 – 1892	Succeeded by Thomas Usborne
