= Chelmsford (constituency) =

UK Parliament constituency (1885–1997, 2010 onwards)

- Borough constituency for the House of Commons
- Interactive map of boundaries since 2024
- Location within the East of England
- County: Essex
- Population: 105,424 (2011 census)
- Electorate: 76,454 (March 2020)
- Major settlements: Chelmsford, Great Baddow

Current constituency
- Created: 2010
- Member of Parliament: Marie Goldman (Liberal Democrats)
- Seats: One
- Created from: West Chelmsford, Maldon and East Chelmsford

1885–1997
- Created from: South Essex, West Essex
- Replaced by: West Chelmsford, Maldon and East Chelmsford, Rayleigh

Chelmsford is a constituency in Essex (Note: A borough constituency (for the purposes of election expenses and type of returning officer).) represented in the House of Commons of the UK Parliament since 2024 by Marie Goldman of the Liberal Democrats. (Note: As with all constituencies, the constituency elects one Member of Parliament (MP) by the first past the post system of election at least every five years.)

== Constituency profile ==
The constituency covers the city of Chelmsford in Essex. Chelmsford is the county town of Essex and was granted city status in 2012. The city was traditionally an agricultural market town but had a growth of industry in the 19th century; it is often described as the "birthplace of radio" as the founding location of the Marconi Company, although the company is no longer in operation. The city is generally affluent and many neighbourhoods (Springfield, Moulsham and parts of Great Baddow) fall within the 10% least-deprived areas in England.

On average, residents of Chelmsford have high household income and are more likely to work in professional jobs compared to the rest of the country. White people make up 85% of the population with Asians, mostly Indians, forming the largest ethnic minority group at 7%. At the local district and county councils, almost all of the city's seats are represented by Liberal Democrat councillors. An estimated 51% of voters in Chelmsford supported leaving the European Union in the 2016 referendum, similar to the nationwide figure.

== History ==
Formally named as the Mid or Chelmsford Division of Essex, the seat was one of eight single-member divisions of Essex (later classified as county constituencies) created by the Redistribution of Seats Act 1885, replacing the three two member divisions of East, South and West Essex. Historically, the constituency was on occasion referred to as 'Mid Essex', especially in the early part of the 20th Century. It continued in existence, gradually being reduced in geographic size as additional seats were created in Essex, until it was briefly abolished for the 1997 general election following the Fourth Periodic Review of Westminster Constituencies and replaced by parts of two new constituencies: Maldon and East Chelmsford and West Chelmsford. It was re-established for the 2010 general election as a Borough Constituency by the Fifth Periodic Review.

During its latter years, the old seat was narrowly won by a Conservative over strong Liberal Democrat performances, including their predecessor party the Liberal Party. At its first contest in 2010, the re-established seat was closely fought by the Conservatives and the Liberal Democrats, who finished less than 10% apart, with Conservative candidate Simon Burns (the former MP for West Chelmsford) being elected. Labour polled 11%, despite having been only around 100 votes behind the Liberal Democrats in West Chelmsford in 2005, and even taking second place in 2001. Labour regained second place for the 2015 and 2017 elections but were overtaken again by the Liberal Democrats in 2019.

At the 2024 general election, Marie Goldman of the Liberal Democrats was returned as MP for Chelmsford. Prior to Goldman's election, Chelmsford had been held by the Conservatives for 74 years, since the 1950 general election.

== Boundaries and boundary changes ==
=== Historic ===
==== 1885–1918 ====
- The Sessional Divisions of Brentwood (except the parishes of Rainham and Wennington) and Chelmsford.

Formed from parts of the abolished South (Brentwood) and West Divisions (Chelmsford).

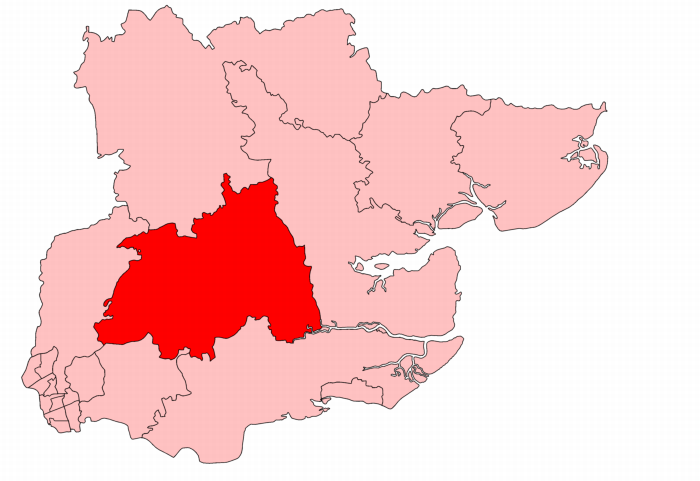
Chelmsford in Essex, showing boundaries used from 1918 to 1945

==== 1918–1945 ====
- The Borough of Chelmsford;
- The Urban District of Brentwood
- The Rural Districts of Chelmsford and Ongar: and
- The Rural District of Billericay parishes of Hutton, Ingrave, Mountnessing, Shenfield, and South Weald.

Gained eastern part of the Epping Division, including Chipping Ongar. The south-western corner, including Upminster, was transferred to Romford and southernmost parts, including the town of Billericay, to the South-Eastern Division.

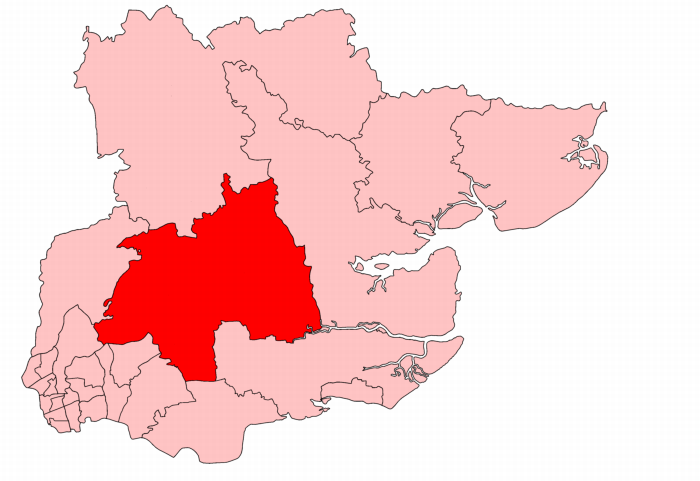
Chelmsford in Essex, showing boundaries used from 1945 to 1950

==== 1945–1950 ====
- The Borough of Chelmsford;
- The Urban District of Brentwood; and
- The Rural Districts of Chelmsford and Ongar.

Minor changes following the reorganisation of local authorities, involving the abolition of the Rural District of Billericay and the expansion of the Urban District of Brentwood.

==== 1950–1955 ====
- The Borough of Chelmsford; and
- The Rural Districts of Chelmsford and Ongar.

Brentwood transferred to Romford.

==== 1955–1974 ====
- The Borough of Chelmsford; and
- The Rural District of Chelmsford.

The Rural District of Ongar included in the new constituency of Chigwell.

==== 1974–1983 ====
- The Borough of Chelmsford; and
- The Rural District of Chelmsford parishes of Danbury, East Hanningfield, Great Baddow, Highwood, Ingatestone and Fryerning, Little Baddow, Margaretting, Mountnessing, Rettendon, Runwell, Sandon, South Hanningfield, Stock, West Hanningfield, and Woodham Ferrers.

Northern parts of the Rural District of Chelmsford transferred to the new constituency of Braintree.

==== 1983–1997 ====
- The Borough of Chelmsford wards of All Saints, Baddow Road, Boreham and Springfield, Cathedral, Danbury and Sandon, East and West Hanningfield, Galleywood, Goat Hall, Great Baddow Village, Highwood and Margaretting, Little Baddow, Mildmays, Moulsham Lodge, Oaklands, Patching Hall, Rothmans, St Andrew's, Stock, The Lawns, and Waterhouse Farm.

Gained the Boreham and Springfield ward from Braintree. Two parishes (Ingatestone and Fryerning, and Mountnessing), included in the District of Brentwood under the Local Government Act 1972, were transferred to Brentwood and Ongar. South-eastern areas, including South Woodham Ferrers, were included in the new constituency of Rochford.

For the 1997 general election the constituency was abolished. Northern and western areas forming the majority of the new constituency of West Chelmsford; eastern areas included in the new constituency of Maldon and East Chelmsford; and a small area in the south included in the constituency of Rayleigh.

Map of boundaries 2010–2024

==== 2010–2024 ====
- The City of Chelmsford wards of Chelmer Village and Beaulieu Park, Galleywood, Goat Hall, Great Baddow East, Great Baddow West, Marconi, Moulsham and Central, Moulsham Lodge, Patching Hall, St Andrew's, Springfield North, The Lawns, Trinity, and Waterhouse Farm.

Following the Boundary Commission's Fifth Periodic Review of Westminster constituencies in 2007, Parliament re-established Chelmsford as a borough constituency for the 2010 general election. For the previous three elections the constituency had been split in two halves and included more surrounding rural settlements. A majority of the electorate for this new constituency came from the previous West Chelmsford constituency. A smaller element (Great Baddow and Galleywood) came from the Maldon & East Chelmsford constituency.

The new constituency coincides with the built-up area which comprises the City of Chelmsford.

=== Current ===
Further to the 2023 review of Westminster constituencies, which came into effect for the 2024 general election, the composition of the constituency was reduced to meet the electorate size requirements, with the transfer to Maldon of the Galleywood ward in the south of the city.

The revised constituency is made up of 78.9% by area and 95.1% by population of the previous (2010-2024) version of the seat, the remaining part going to Maldon.

== Members of Parliament ==
=== MPs 1885–1997 ===
West Essex and South Essex prior to 1885

Election	Member	Party
1885	William Beadel	Conservative
1892 by-election	Thomas Usborne	Conservative
1900	Sir Carne Rasch, Bt	Conservative
1908 by-election	E. G. Pretyman	Conservative
1918	E. G. Pretyman	Coalition Conservative
1922	E. G. Pretyman	Conservative
1923	Sydney Robinson	Liberal
1924	Henry Curtis-Bennett	Conservative
1926 by-election	Charles Howard-Bury	Conservative
1931	Sir Vivian Henderson	Conservative
1935	John Macnamara	Conservative
1945 by-election	Ernest Millington	Common Wealth
1946	Ernest Millington	Labour
1950	Sir Hubert Ashton	Conservative
1964	Norman St John-Stevas	Conservative
1987	Simon Burns	Conservative
1997	Constituency abolished – see West Chelmsford, Maldon and Chelmsford East, Rayleigh	

=== MPs since 2010 ===
West Chelmsford and Maldon & East Chelmsford 1997 to 2010

Election	Member	Party
2010	Sir Simon Burns	Conservative
2017	Vicky Ford	Conservative
2024	Marie Goldman	Liberal Democrats

== Elections ==
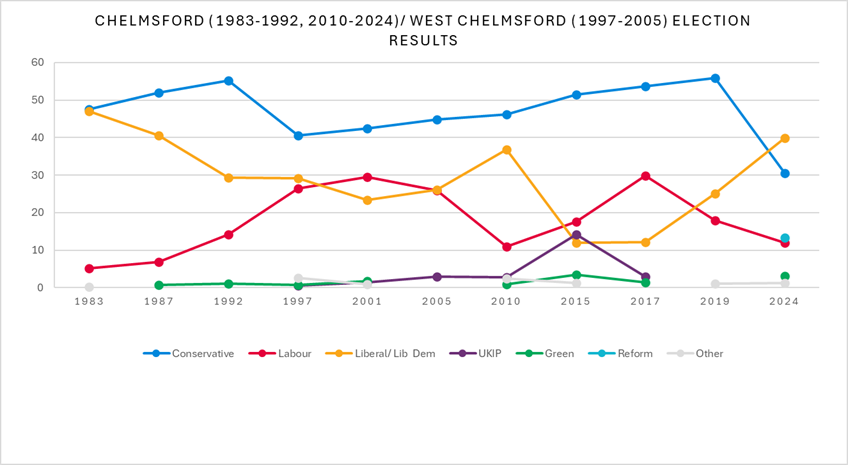
Chelmsford/Chelmsford West election results 1983–2024

=== Elections in the 2020s ===
General election 2024: Chelmsford
Party	Candidate	Votes	%	±%
Liberal Democrats	Marie Goldman	20,214	39.9	+13.8
Conservative	Vicky Ford	15,461	30.5	−24.2
Reform	Darren Ingrouille	6,754	13.3	N/A
Labour	Richard Parry	6,108	12.0	−6.1
Green	Reza Hossain	1,588	3.1	N/A
Ind. Network	Richard Hyland	230	0.5	N/A
Monster Raving Loony	Mark CitiZen Lawrence	187	0.4	−0.7
Workers Party	Mark Kenlen	105	0.2	N/A
Independent	Kamla Sangha	69	0.1	N/A
Majority		4,753	9.4	N/A
Turnout		50,716	65.9	−4.5
Registered electors		76,972		
Liberal Democrats gain from Conservative		Swing	+19.0	

=== Elections in the 2010s ===
2019 notional result
Party	Vote	%
Conservative	29,447	54.7
Liberal Democrats	14,031	26.1
Labour	9,768	18.1
Others	580	1.1
Turnout	53,826	70.4
Electorate	76,454	

General election 2019: Chelmsford
Party	Candidate	Votes	%	±%
Conservative	Vicky Ford	31,934	55.9	+2.2
Liberal Democrats	Marie Goldman	14,313	25.1	+12.9
Labour	Penny Richards	10,295	18.0	−11.8
Monster Raving Loony	Mark Lawrence	580	1.0	N/A
Majority		17,621	30.8	+6.9
Turnout		57,122	71.0	+0.8
Conservative hold		Swing	−5.3	

General election 2017: Chelmsford
Party	Candidate	Votes	%	±%
Conservative	Vicky Ford	30,525	53.7	+2.2
Labour	Chris Vince	16,953	29.8	+12.2
Liberal Democrats	Stephen Robinson	6,916	12.2	+0.3
UKIP	Nigel Carter	1,645	2.9	−11.3
Green	Reza Hossain	821	1.4	−2.1
Majority		13,572	23.9	−10.0
Turnout		56,860	70.2	+1.7
Conservative hold		Swing	−5.0	

General election 2015: Chelmsford
Party	Candidate	Votes	%	±%
Conservative	Simon Burns	27,732	51.5	+5.3
Labour	Chris Vince	9,482	17.6	+6.6
UKIP	Mark Gough	7,652	14.2	+11.4
Liberal Democrats	Stephen Robinson	6,394	11.9	−24.9
Green	Angela Thomson	1,892	3.5	+2.6
Liberal	Henry Boyle	665	1.2	N/A
Majority		18,250	33.9	+24.5
Turnout		53,817	68.5	−1.9
Conservative hold		Swing		

General election 2010: Chelmsford
Party	Candidate	Votes	%	±%
Conservative	Simon Burns*	25,207	46.2	+6.7
Liberal Democrats	Stephen Robinson	20,097	36.8	+6.6
Labour	Peter Dixon	5,980	11.0	−16.0
UKIP	Ken Wedon	1,527	2.8	−0.6
BNP	Michael Bateman	899	1.6	N/A
Green	Angela Thomson	476	0.9	N/A
English Democrat	Claire Breed	254	0.5	+0.3
Reduce Tax On Beer	Ben Sherman	153	0.3	N/A
Majority		5,110	9.4	
Turnout		54,593	70.4	−14.2
Conservative hold		Swing		

* Served in the 2005–2010 Parliament as MP for West Chelmsford

=== Elections in the 1990s ===
General election 1992: Chelmsford
Party	Candidate	Votes	%	±%
Conservative	Simon Burns	39,043	55.3	+3.4
Liberal Democrats	Hugh Nicholson	20,783	29.4	−11.1
Labour	Roy Chad	10,010	14.2	+7.4
Green	Eleanor Burgess	769	1.1	+0.4
Majority		18,260	25.9	+14.5
Turnout		70,605	84.6	+2.4
Conservative hold		Swing	+7.2	

=== Elections in the 1980s ===
General election 1987: Chelmsford
Party	Candidate	Votes	%	±%
Conservative	Simon Burns	35,231	51.9	+4.3
Liberal	Stuart Mole	27,470	40.5	−6.5
Labour	Clive Playford	4,642	6.8	+1.7
Green	Anthony Slade	486	0.7	N/A
Majority		7,761	11.4	+10.8
Turnout		67,829	82.2	+2.8
Conservative hold		Swing	+5.4	

General election 1983: Chelmsford
Party	Candidate	Votes	%	±%
Conservative	Norman St John-Stevas	29,824	47.6	−2.0
Liberal	Stuart Mole	29,446	47.0	+5.5
Labour	Clive Playford	3,208	5.1	−3.8
Independent	Philip Waite	127	0.2	N/A
Majority		378	0.6	−9.3
Turnout		62,605	79.4	−4.5
Conservative hold		Swing	−4.7	

=== Elections in the 1970s ===
General election 1979: Chelmsford
Party	Candidate	Votes	%	±%
Conservative	Norman St John-Stevas	33,808	49.6	+8.0
Liberal	Stuart Mole	28,337	41.5	+6.3
Labour	Susan Ann Reeves	6,041	8.9	−14.3
Majority		5,471	8.1	+1.7
Turnout		68,186	81.0	+1.8
Conservative hold		Swing	+0.9	

General election October 1974: Chelmsford
Party	Candidate	Votes	%	±%
Conservative	Norman St John-Stevas	26,334	41.6	−1.3
Liberal	Stuart Mole	22,332	35.2	+2.2
Labour	John Thomas Acklaw	14,711	23.2	−0.9
Majority		4,002	6.4	−3.5
Turnout		66,377	79.2	−4.7
Conservative hold		Swing	−1.8	

General election February 1974: Chelmsford
Party	Candidate	Votes	%	±%
Conservative	Norman St John-Stevas	28,560	42.9	−11.1
Liberal	Stuart Mole	21,929	33.0	+24.3
Labour	Frances Morrell	16,063	24.1	−12.7
Majority		6,631	9.9	
Turnout		66,552	83.9	
Conservative hold		Swing		

General election 1970: Chelmsford
Party	Candidate	Votes	%	±%
Conservative	Norman St John-Stevas	36,821	55.2	+8.0
Labour	Gavin Kennedy	23,780	35.6	−3.4
Liberal	Jessie Hunt	5,811	8.7	−5.2
Independent	Joseph D. Steel	350	0.5	N/A
Majority		13,041	19.5	
Turnout		66,762	75.6	
Conservative hold		Swing	+5.3	

=== Elections in the 1960s ===
General election 1966: Chelmsford
Party	Candidate	Votes	%	±%
Conservative	Norman St John-Stevas	28,600	47.2	
Labour	Colin George	23,625	39.0	
Liberal	W Peter Longhurst	8,419	13.9	
Majority		4,975	8.20	
Turnout		60,644	82.47	
Conservative hold		Swing	−2.00	

General election 1964: Chelmsford
Party	Candidate	Votes	%	±%
Conservative	Norman St John-Stevas	27,849	47.95	
Labour	E Gordon Lawrence	20,816	35.84	
Liberal	W Peter Longhurst	9,414	16.21	
Majority		7,033	12.11	
Turnout		58,105	82.78	
Conservative hold		Swing		

=== Elections in the 1950s ===
General election 1959: Chelmsford
Party	Candidate	Votes	%	±%
Conservative	Hubert Ashton	29,992	59.85	
Labour	Brian Ralph Clapham	20,124	40.15	
Majority		9,868	19.70	
Turnout		50,116	81.32	
Conservative hold		Swing		

General election 1955: Chelmsford
Party	Candidate	Votes	%	±%
Conservative	Hubert Ashton	25,450	55.63	
Labour	Bernard Floud	20,301	44.37	
Majority		5,149	11.26	
Turnout		45,751	81.82	
Conservative hold		Swing		

General election 1951: Chelmsford
Party	Candidate	Votes	%	±%
Conservative	Hubert Ashton	29,069	55.01	
Labour	James Haworth	23,775	44.99	
Majority		5,294	10.02	
Turnout		52,844	83.31	
Conservative hold		Swing		

General election 1950: Chelmsford
Party	Candidate	Votes	%	±%
Conservative	Hubert Ashton	28,541	54.65	
Labour	Ernest Millington	23,682	45.35	
Majority		4,859	9.30	N/A
Turnout		52,223	84.33	
Conservative gain from Common Wealth		Swing		

=== Elections in the 1940s ===
General election 1945: Chelmsford
Party	Candidate	Votes	%	±%
Common Wealth	Ernest Millington	27,309	46.7	N/A
Conservative	Hubert Ashton	25,229	43.2	−27.6
Liberal	Hilda Buckmaster	5,909	10.1	N/A
Majority		2,080	3.5	N/A
Turnout		58,447	73.4	+8.0
Common Wealth gain from Conservative		Swing		

1945 Chelmsford by-election
Party	Candidate	Votes	%	±%
Common Wealth	Ernest Millington	24,548	57.5	N/A
Conservative	Brian Batsford	18,117	42.5	−28.3
Majority		6,431	15.0	N/A
Turnout		42,665	54.1	−11.3
Common Wealth gain from Conservative		Swing		

General Election 1939–40:

Another General Election was required to take place before the end of 1940. The political parties had been making preparations for an election to take place from 1939 and by the end of this year, the following candidates had been selected;

- Conservative: John Macnamara
- Labour: Mary Day

=== Elections in the 1930s ===
General election 1935: Chelmsford
Party	Candidate	Votes	%	±%
Conservative	John Macnamara	28,314	70.8	−9.7
Labour	Fred Hughes	11,690	29.2	+9.7
Majority		16,624	41.6	−19.4
Turnout		40,004	65.4	−5.5
Conservative hold		Swing		

General election 1931: Chelmsford
Party	Candidate	Votes	%	±%
Conservative	Vivian Henderson	31,961	80.5	+36.7
Labour	Joseph Sparks	7,755	19.5	−3.3
Majority		24,206	61.0	+50.6
Turnout		39,716	70.9	−4.2
Conservative hold		Swing		

=== Elections in the 1920s ===
General election 1929: Chelmsford
Party	Candidate	Votes	%	±%
Unionist	Charles Howard-Bury	17,094	43.8	−4.0
Liberal	Sydney Robinson	13,034	33.4	+3.2
Labour	Nils Henry Moller	8,910	22.8	+0.8
Majority		4,060	10.4	−7.2
Turnout		39,038	75.1	+4.6
Unionist hold		Swing	−3.6	

1926 Chelmsford by-election
Party	Candidate	Votes	%	±%
Unionist	Charles Howard-Bury	13,395	47.8	−6.9
Liberal	Sydney Robinson	8,435	30.2	−5.1
Labour	Nils Henry Moller	6,140	22.0	+12.0
Majority		4,960	17.6	−1.8
Turnout		27,970	70.5	−6.6
Unionist hold		Swing	−0.9	

General election 1924: Chelmsford
Party	Candidate	Votes	%	±%
Unionist	Henry Curtis-Bennett	15,875	54.7	+10.5
Liberal	Sydney Robinson	10,244	35.3	−20.5
Labour	Nils Henry Moller	2,904	10.0	N/A
Majority		5,631	19.4	N/A
Turnout		29,023	77.1	+13.6
Unionist gain from Liberal		Swing	+15.5	

General election 1923: Chelmsford
Party	Candidate	Votes	%	±%
Liberal	Sydney Robinson	12,877	55.8	+26.0
Unionist	E. G. Pretyman	10,185	44.2	−8.4
Majority		2,692	11.6	N/A
Turnout		23,062	63.5	+2.5
Liberal gain from Unionist		Swing	+17.2	

General election 1922: Chelmsford
Party	Candidate	Votes	%	±%
Unionist	E. G. Pretyman	11,267	52.6	−14.3
Liberal	Sydney Robinson	6,380	29.8	N/A
Labour	Clara Rackham	3,767	17.6	−15.5
Majority		4,887	22.8	−11.0
Turnout		21,414	61.0	+10.8
Unionist hold		Swing	N/A	

=== Elections in the 1910s ===
General election 1918: Chelmsford
Party		Candidate	Votes	%	±%
C	Unionist	E. G. Pretyman	11,217	66.9	N/A
	Labour	William Frederick Toynbee	5,551	33.1	N/A
Majority			5,666	33.8	N/A
Turnout			16,768	50.2	N/A
	Unionist hold		Swing	N/A	
C indicates candidate endorsed by the coalition government.

General election December 1910: Chelmsford
Party	Candidate	Votes	%	±%
Conservative	E. G. Pretyman	Unopposed		
Conservative hold				

General election January 1910: Chelmsford
Party	Candidate	Votes	%	±%
Conservative	E. G. Pretyman	6,816	61.5	+9.1
Liberal	T.Cuthbertson	4,271	38.5	−9.1
Majority		2,545	23.0	+18.2
Turnout		11,087	83.3	+3.6
Registered electors		13,314		
Conservative hold		Swing		

=== Elections in the 1900s ===
1908 Chelmsford by-election
Party	Candidate	Votes	%	±%
Conservative	E. G. Pretyman	6,152	63.2	+10.8
Liberal	Alexander Henry Dence	3,587	36.8	
Majority		2,565	26.4	+21.6
Turnout		9,739	77.7	−2.0
Registered electors		12,539		
Conservative hold		Swing	+10.8	

General election January 1906: Chelmsford
Party	Candidate	Votes	%	±%
Conservative	Carne Rasch	4,915	52.4	−20.5
Liberal	Alexander Henry Dence	4,461	47.6	+20.5
Majority		454	4.8	−41.0
Turnout		9,376	79.7	+13.7
Registered electors		11,767		
Conservative hold		Swing	+20.5	

General election October 1900: Chelmsford
Party	Candidate	Votes	%	±%
Conservative	Carne Rasch	4,978	72.9	N/A
Liberal	Charles Henry	1,849	27.1	N/A
Majority		3,129	45.8	N/A
Turnout		6,827	66.0	N/A
Registered electors		10,341		
Conservative hold		Swing	N/A	

=== Elections in the 1890s ===
General election 1895: Chelmsford
Party	Candidate	Votes	%	±%
Conservative	Thomas Usborne	Unopposed		
Conservative hold				

General election 1892: Chelmsford
Party	Candidate	Votes	%	±%
Conservative	Thomas Usborne	4,168	59.8	N/A
Liberal	William Ebenezer Grigsby	2,799	40.2	N/A
Majority		1,369	19.6	N/A
Turnout		6,967	74.6	N/A
Registered electors		9,333		
Conservative hold		Swing	N/A	

By-election, Chelmsford 1892
Party	Candidate	Votes	%	±%
Conservative	Thomas Usborne	Unopposed		
Conservative hold				

=== Elections in the 1880s ===
General election 1886: Chelmsford
Party	Candidate	Votes	%	±%
Conservative	William Beadel	Unopposed		
Conservative hold				

General election 1885: Chelmsford
Party	Candidate	Votes	%	±%
Conservative	William Beadel	4,321	58.4	
Liberal	Richard Martin	3,079	41.6	
Majority		1,242	16.8	
Turnout		7,400	79.8	
Registered electors		9,277		
Conservative win (new seat)				

== Boundary changes ==
Preceded by Constituency created	UK Parliament constituency Chelmsford (West), Writtle; 1885–1997	Succeeded by Chelmsford West
Preceded by Constituency created	UK Parliament constituency Chelmsford (East), Great Baddow, Danbury; 1885–1997	Succeeded by Maldon and Chelmsford East
Preceded by Constituency created	UK Parliament constituency Ingatestone; 1885–1974	Succeeded by Brentwood and Ongar
Preceded by Constituency created	UK Parliament constituency Ongar; 1885–1955	Succeeded by Chigwell
Preceded by Constituency created	UK Parliament constituency Brentwood; 1885–1950	Succeeded by Romford

== See also ==
- List of parliamentary constituencies in Essex

== Sources ==
- F. W. S. Craig, British Parliamentary Election Results 1974 – 1983
- The Times Guide to the House of Commons 1983, 1987 & 1992
