= Charles Brinsley Marlay =

Anglo-Irish landowner and art collector

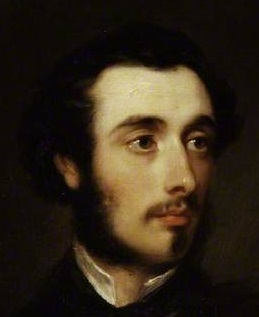
A c.1850 portrait of Marlay bequeathed by him to the Fitzwilliam Museum

Charles Brinsley Marlay (1831 – 18 June 1912) was an Anglo-Irish landowner and art collector.

== Life ==
He studied at Eton College and Trinity College, Cambridge. He had large estates in Ireland, including Belvedere House and Gardens and the Jealous Wall (both inherited from Marlay's cousin Brinsley Butler, 4th Earl of Lanesborough in 1847) and Tyrrellspass Castle (inherited from Marlay's grandmother, who was the only daughter of Robert Rochfort, 1st Earl of Belvedere). He moved into Belvedere House and altered its upper façade's Diocletian windows as well as adding terracing and having plans drawn up by Ninian Niven for a walled garden. He was High Sheriff of Westmeath for 1853 and 1906, Louth for 1863 and Cavan for 1885. He stood as one of the two Conservative candidates for the Grantham constituency at the 1880 general election but they both lost.

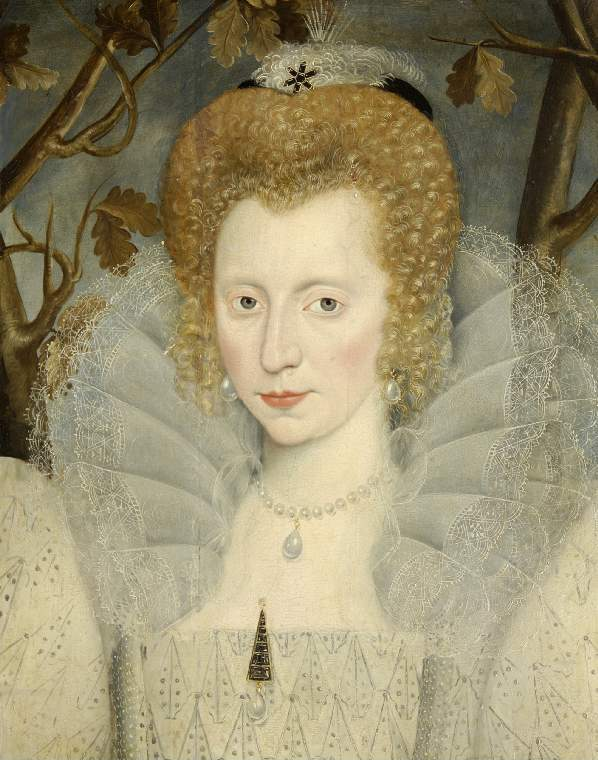
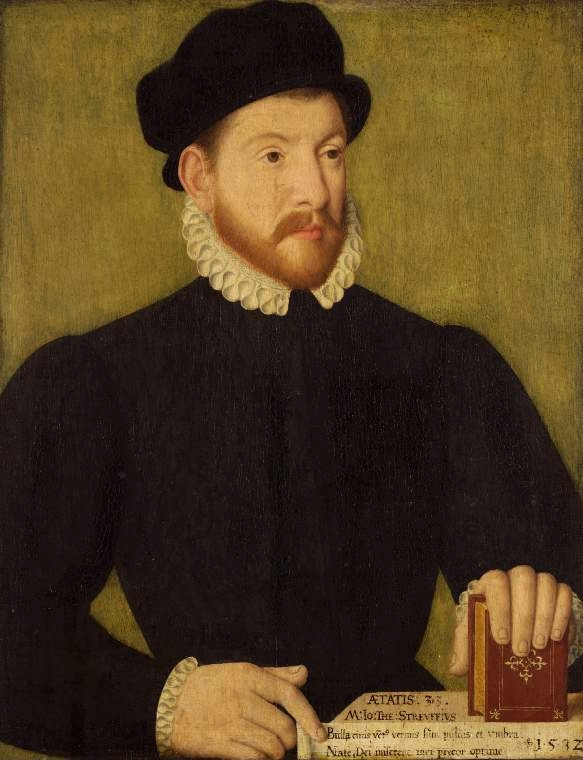
Two 16th century portraits, both bequeathed to the Fitzwilliam Museum by Marlay in 1912

He became a member of the Burlington Fine Arts Club, which held a manuscript exhibition in 1908 organised by Sydney Cockerell, Director of the Fitzwilliam Museum. Marlay lent some of his own manuscripts to the exhibition. Cockerell also went to meet him in July 1908 to discuss "an addition to the Fitzwilliam". Marlay was keen to bequeath his collection but the Fitzwilliam did not yet have enough space or staff to cope with it and so Marlay also offered a financial bequest, bargained up from £50,000 to £80,000 thanks to Cockerell and also finally including the lease on Marlay's London house.

Marley died at St. Katharine's Lodge, Regent's Park on 18 June 1912. He made good on his offer to Cockerell and also left the museum eighteen books, 240 cuttings from 12th to 16th century illuminated manuscripts, all the manuscripts he had loaned in 1908, 84 paintings, prints, decorative arts, jewellery, glassware, carpets and Japanese artworks as well as some works that Cockerell disposed of as "modern, imitation, or of too low standard for an important museum". However, the money bequeathed by Marlay did still enable building works and established the Marlay Fund, the museum's first-ever purchase fund. Marlay did not leave everything to the Fitzwilliam, however. His personal papers and collection of family manuscripts were instead bequeathed to Richard Warwick Bond, who had edited William Bercher's 1559 Nobility of Women for the Roxburghe Club at Marlay's request - they are now in the University of Nottingham. Belvedere House and Tyrrellspass Castle both passed from Marlay to Charles Howard-Bury.

== Arms ==
Coat of arms of Charles Brinsley Marlay

Notes
Exemplified 1 October 1896 by Arthur Edward Vicars, Ulster King of Arms.
Crest
1st on a wreath of the colours a Robin redbreast Proper (Rochfort) 2nd on a wreath of the colours an eagle displayed Proper above it on an escroll "Nulli Praed Asumus"
Escutcheon
Quarterly 1st & 4th Azure a lion rampant Argent armed and langued Gules (Rochfort) 2nd & 3rd barry of eight Or and Gules on a bordure Azure eight martlets of the first (Marlay).
Motto
Candor Dat Viribus Alas
