= 1908 Chelmsford by-election =

1908 UK parliamentary by-election

The 1908 Chelmsford by-election was a parliamentary by-election held on 1 December 1908. The constituency returned one Member of Parliament (MP) to the House of Commons of the United Kingdom, elected by the first past the post voting system.

== Vacancy ==
Sir Carne Rasch had been Conservative MP for the seat of Chelmsford since the 1900 general election. His resignation came at the age of 61.

== Electoral history ==
The seat had been Conservative since its creation in 1885. They held the seat at the last election, with a vastly reduced majority;

General election January 1906 Electorate 11,767
| Party | Candidate | Votes | % | ±% |
|---|---|---|---|---|
| Conservative | Carne Rasch | 4,915 | 52.4 | −20.5 |
| Liberal | A.H. Dence | 4,461 | 47.6 | +20.5 |
| Majority | | 454 | 4.8 | −41.0 |
| Turnout | | 9,376 | 79.7 | +13.7 |
| Conservative hold | | Swing | +20.5 | |

== Candidates ==
The Conservatives selected 48-year-old E. G. Pretyman as their candidate. He had been MP for Woodbridge in Suffolk until his defeat to the Liberals in 1906. He was Civil Lord of the Admiralty from 1900–1903 and Parliamentary and Financial Secretary to the Admiralty from 1903–1906. The local Liberal Association re-selected A.H. Dence to attack the seat. Dence had been defeated at Chelmsford by Sir Carne Rasch in January 1906. His slogan: 'Don't be rash, Vote for Dence' was countered by the successful Conservative's 'Don't be dense, Vote for Rasch.'

== Campaign ==
Polling Day was fixed for 1 December 1908.

The Liberal government had introduced the Small Holdings and Allotments Act 1907 which sought to limit the degree to which fixtures and improvements remained the property of landlords, and to increase the number of small farmers. This new measure was expected to have a strong appeal to voters in rural constituencies like Chelmsford.

The Conservative campaign was assisted by the presence of immigrant Presbyterian farmers from Ayrshire, and some prominent Quaker Conservatives. The contest was embittered, leading to a full day's work for magistrates dealing with summonses.

== Result ==
Pretyman increased the Conservative share of the poll by over ten per cent;

Chelmsford by-election, 1908 Electorate 12,539
| Party | Candidate | Votes | % | ±% |
|---|---|---|---|---|
| Conservative | E. G. Pretyman | 6,152 | 63.2 | +10.8 |
| Liberal | A.H. Dence | 3,587 | 36.8 | −10.8 |
| Majority | | 2,565 | 26.4 | +21.6 |
| Turnout | | 9,739 | 77.7 | −2.0 |
| Conservative hold | | Swing | +10.8 | |

== Aftermath ==
Pretyman was re-elected at the next General Election and Dence did not stand again.

General election January 1910 Electorate 13,314
| Party | Candidate | Votes | % | ±% |
|---|---|---|---|---|
| Conservative | E. G. Pretyman | 6,816 | 61.5 | −1.7 |
| Liberal | T.Cuthbertson | 4,271 | 38.5 | +1.7 |
| Majority | | 2,545 | 23.0 | −3.4 |
| Turnout | | 11,087 | 83.3 | +5.6 |
| Conservative hold | | Swing | -1.7 | |
