= Sydney Robinson (businessman) =

English farmer, building contractor and Liberal politician

Sir Sydney Walter John Robinson JP MP
- Robinson circa 1934

Member of Parliament for Chelmsford
- In office 6 December 1923 – 9 October 1924
- Preceded by: E. G. Pretyman
- Succeeded by: Henry Curtis-Bennett

Personal details
- Born: 27 May 1876 Royston, Hertfordshire, England
- Died: 17 November 1950 (aged 74) Snaresbrook, Essex, England
- Party: Liberal
- Spouse: Gwendolene Edith King (m. 1898)

Sir Sydney Walter John Robinson JP (27 May 1876 – 17 November 1950) was an English farmer, building contractor and Liberal politician.

== Family and education ==
Sydney Robinson was born in 1876 in Royston, Hertfordshire, the son of Alfred and Georgina Robinson. He was educated in Walthamstow but then travelled to the USA where he studied at the Metropolitan College in Chicago. In 1898, he married Gwendolene Edith King.

== Career ==
Robinson had business interests as a building contractor and was also a farmer with land near to Chelmsford. His speciality and success was in the breeding of pedigree shorthorn dairy cows but this as much for agricultural shows as for profit. Robinson served as a Justice of the Peace for the county of Essex. He was also a Freeman of the City of London.

== Politics ==
=== Local Politics ===
In local politics, Robinson was a member of Essex County Council for 30 years and was an Alderman of the council. He chaired the Public Health Committee. He was knighted in 1934. He served as a Vice-President of the Home Counties Liberal Federation.

=== Parliamentary politics ===
==== 1918–1923 ====
Robinson stood for Parliament eight times in all. He first contested Essex South East at the 1918 general election but lost his deposit in a three-cornered fight with the successful Coalition Conservative and Labour Party candidates. He next contested Chelmsford in Essex at the 1922 general election coming second to the Conservative Member of Parliament for the constituency since 1908, E. G. Pretyman, with Labour in third. He fought Chelmsford again in 1923 this time in a straight fight with Pretyman. The absence of a Labour candidate and recent industrial developments around Chelmsford enhanced Robinson's chances of success and he duly recorded the only success of his Parliamentary career, winning with a majority of 2,692 votes. This was the first time since its creation for the 1885 general election that Chelmsford had returned a Liberal MP.

==== 1923–1924 ====
During his time in Parliament Robinson was best known for his introduction of a Bill to include farm workers in the National Unemployed Insurance scheme. During the 1924 general election the Conservative Party enjoyed a revival of fortune nationally and Robinson could not hold his seat in a three-cornered contest with Tory and Labour opponents. He came second to the new Conservative candidate Sir Henry Curtis-Bennett with the Labour man, Major Nils Moller losing his deposit.

==== Chelmsford by-election, 1926 ====
Curtis-Bennett resigned his seat in 1926 for personal reasons in the wake of his marital problems, soon to end in divorce, citing great strain on his health. His resignation caused a by-election and Robinson again won the Liberal nomination. However, in another three-cornered fight he again came second to the Conservative candidate.

==== 1929–1945 ====
Robinson tried once more to regain Chelmsford, at the 1929 general election. He again came second in a three horse race, and although he increased his percentage of the poll, the Conservatives held the seat by a majority of 4,060 votes. In 1930 he announced that he would not contest the Chelmsford Division again and at the general election of 1931 Robinson switched his candidacy to the constituency of Walthamstow West. In an election held in the atmosphere of the formation of the National Government, despite the fact that his name was added to the Simonite Liberal National list, and in spite of his statements during the election that he was an 'out and out supporter' of the National Government, it was the Conservative rather than Robinson whose candidacy was identified as the most obvious advocate of the government of Ramsay MacDonald. Robinson found his vote squeezed between the Labour and Conservative parties. Labour retained the seat but the Tories jumped into second place over the Liberals. Robinson did not contest the 1935 general election but was prevailed upon to fight in 1945. He switched constituencies to Epping but, standing as a Liberal, he came a poor third behind the two main parties.

== Death ==
Robinson died on 17 November 1950 aged 74 years at his home at The Drive, Snaresbrook in Essex. He and his wife are buried in Queen's Road Cemetery, Walthamstow.

Parliament of the United Kingdom
Preceded by E. G. Pretyman	Member of Parliament for Chelmsford; 1923–1924	Succeeded by Henry Curtis-Bennett
