= Belvedere House and Gardens =

Country house in Ireland

Coordinates: 53.477°N 7.368°W

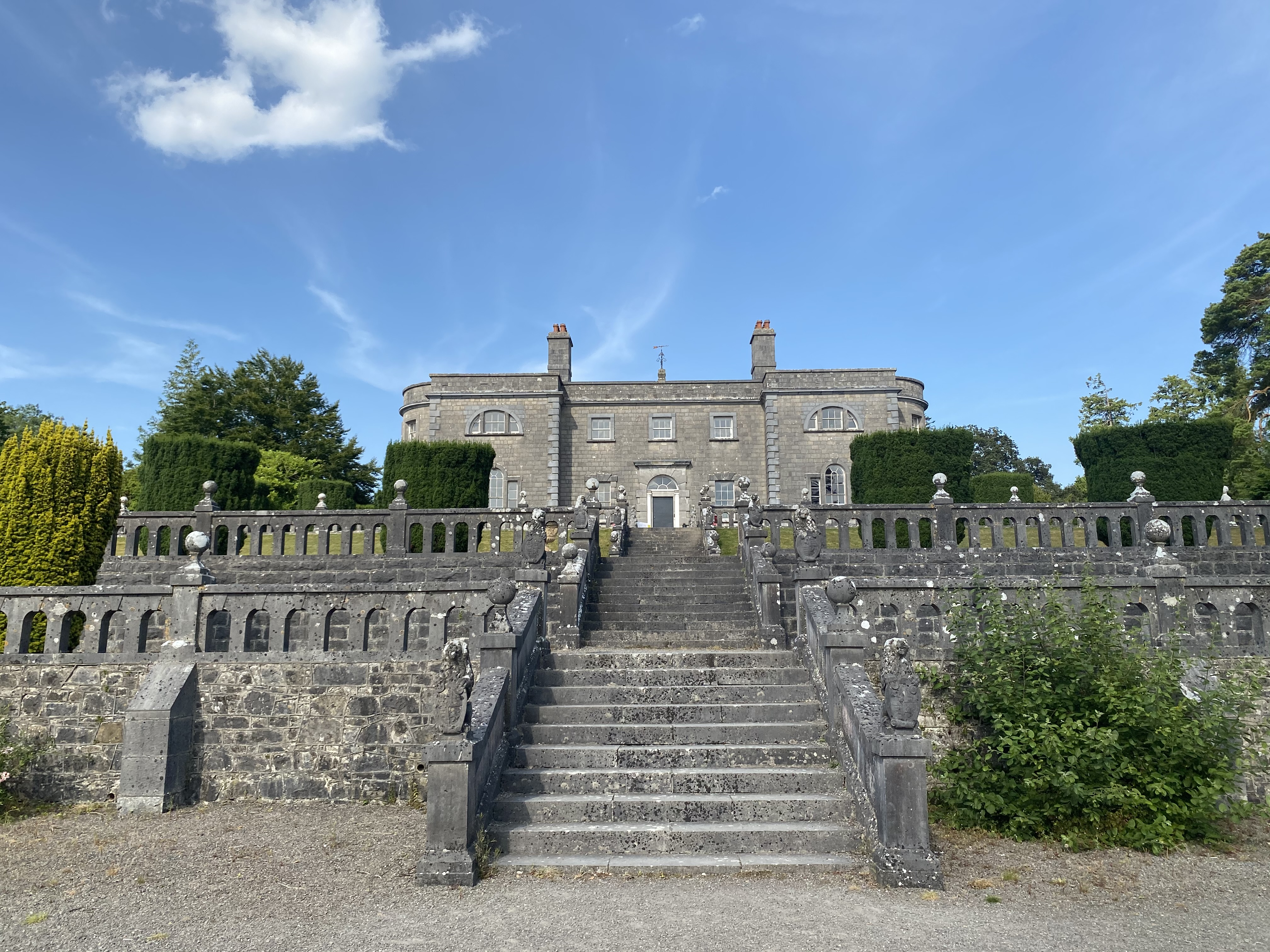
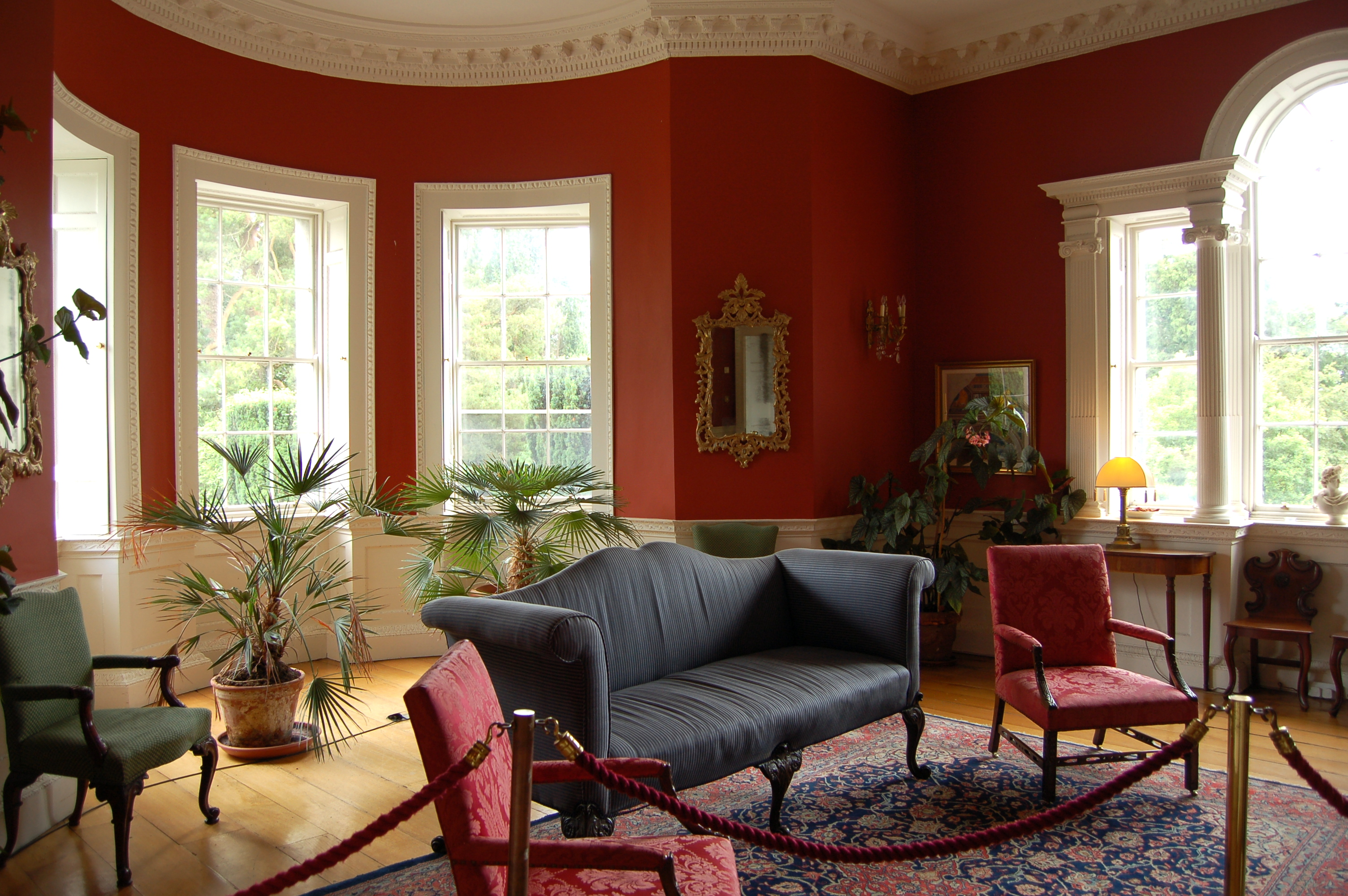
- The exterior, and the Drawing Room
- Interactive map of Belvedere House and Gardens
- Type: Country house
- Location: Mullingar, County Westmeath, Ireland

History
- Built: 1740; 286 years ago

Site notes
- Area: 160 acres (65 ha)
- Architect: Richard Cassels
- Architectural style: Palladian
- Owner: Robert Rochfort, 1st Earl of Belvedere (1740—1774); George Rochfort, 2nd Earl of Belvedere (1774—1828); Brinsley Butler, 4th Earl of Lanesborough (1828—1847); Charles Brinsley Marlay (1847—1912); Charles Howard-Bury (1912—1963); Rex Beaumont (1963—1982); Westmeath County Council (1982—present)

Belvedere House and Gardens is a country house located approximately 8 kilometres (5 mi) from Mullingar, County Westmeath in Ireland on the north-east shore of Lough Ennell. It was built in 1740 as a hunting lodge for Robert Rochfort, 1st Earl of Belvedere by architect Richard Cassels, one of Ireland's foremost Palladian architects.

The house is known for its Diocletian windows and nineteenth-century terracing. When Robert Rochfort decided to use Belvedere as his principal residence, he employed French stuccatore Barthelemij Cramillion, to execute the Rococo plasterwork ceilings. The landscaped demesne has the largest folly and spite wall in the country, The Jealous Wall, built to block off the view of his estranged brother's house nearby. There is also Victorian walled garden and several hectares of forest. The house has been fully restored and the grounds attract approximately 160,000 visitors annually.

== History ==
The house was initially built by Robert Rochfort as a retreat, having incarcerated his wife in their previous home at Gaulstown, for an alleged affair with his brother Arthur. Arthur was later put on trial and fined £20,000 which he could not pay. Arthur spent 18 years in debtors' prison in Dublin but was released upon Robert's death. Robert built The Jealous Wall after falling out with his brother George, who lived on the adjacent estate at Tudenham. His wife was only released on his death in 1774. The estate passed to his son George Augustus Rochfort, the 2nd Earl. He was MP for County Westmeath from 1761 to 1776 and High Sheriff of Westmeath for 1762. He left for England in 1798 and died in 1814. When his widow died in 1828, Belvedere passed to her grandson Brinsley Butler, 4th Earl of Lanesborough. He rarely visited Belvedere and it was subsequently inherited on his death by his cousin Charles Brinsley Marlay in 1847. Charles moved into the house and during his time there was responsible for the alteration of the Diocletian windows on the upper façade and for the addition of the terracing. He commissioned Ninian Niven, curator of the Botanic Gardens in Glasnevin, to draw up plans for the Victorian walled garden. In the period following the second world war, Charles Howard-Bury, who was a soldier and mountaineer, restored the house and gardens. He never married and on his death in 1963, the estate was inherited by Rex Beaumont. Rex had been Howard-Bury's friend and companion for 30 years, and sold the estate to Westmeath County Council in 1982 for £250,000. Following a multimillion-pound restoration, the house and gardens were opened to visitors. Belvedere also hosts weekend music festivals, and garden theatre performances.

== Gallery ==
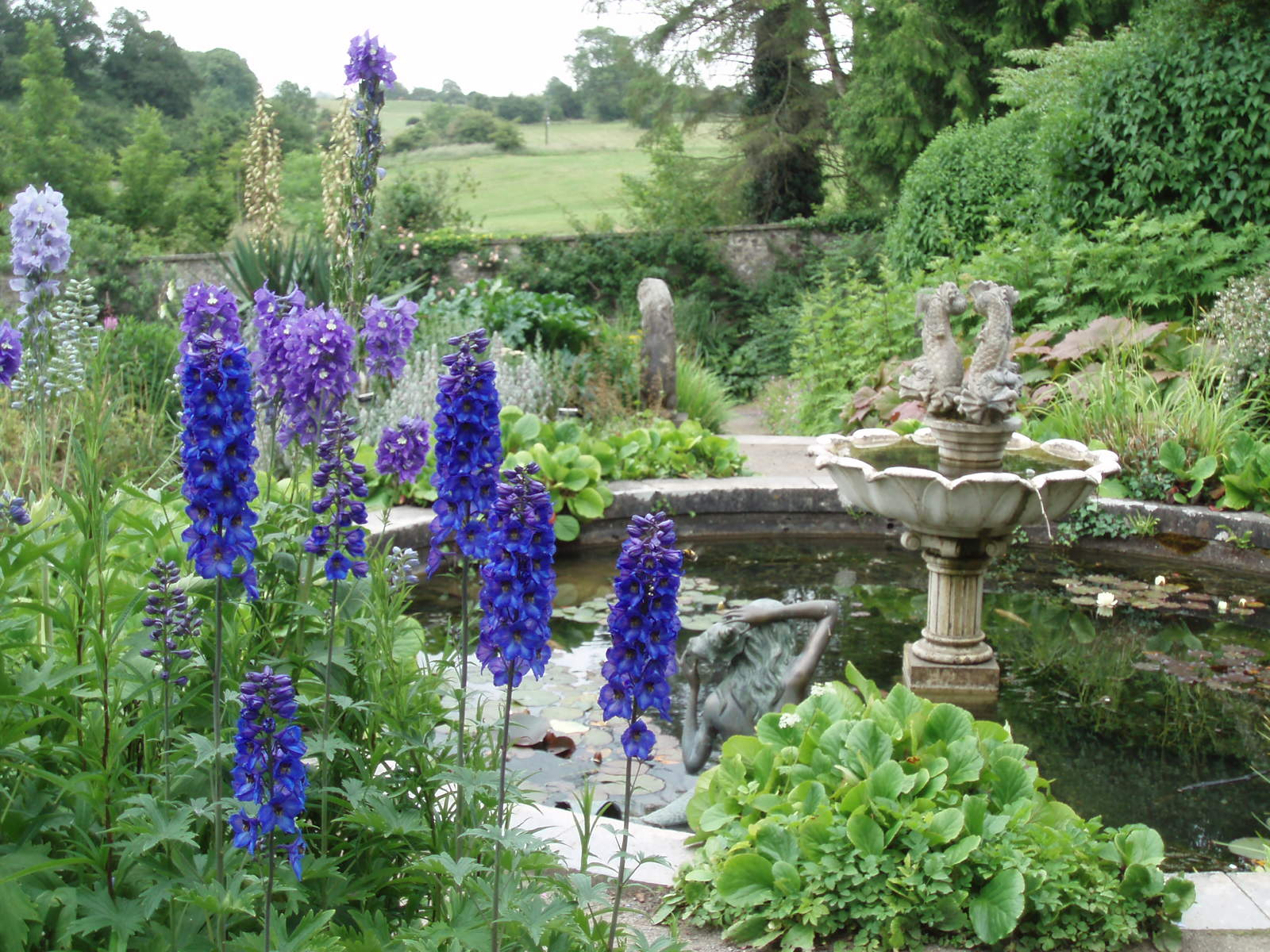
The gardens at Belvedere

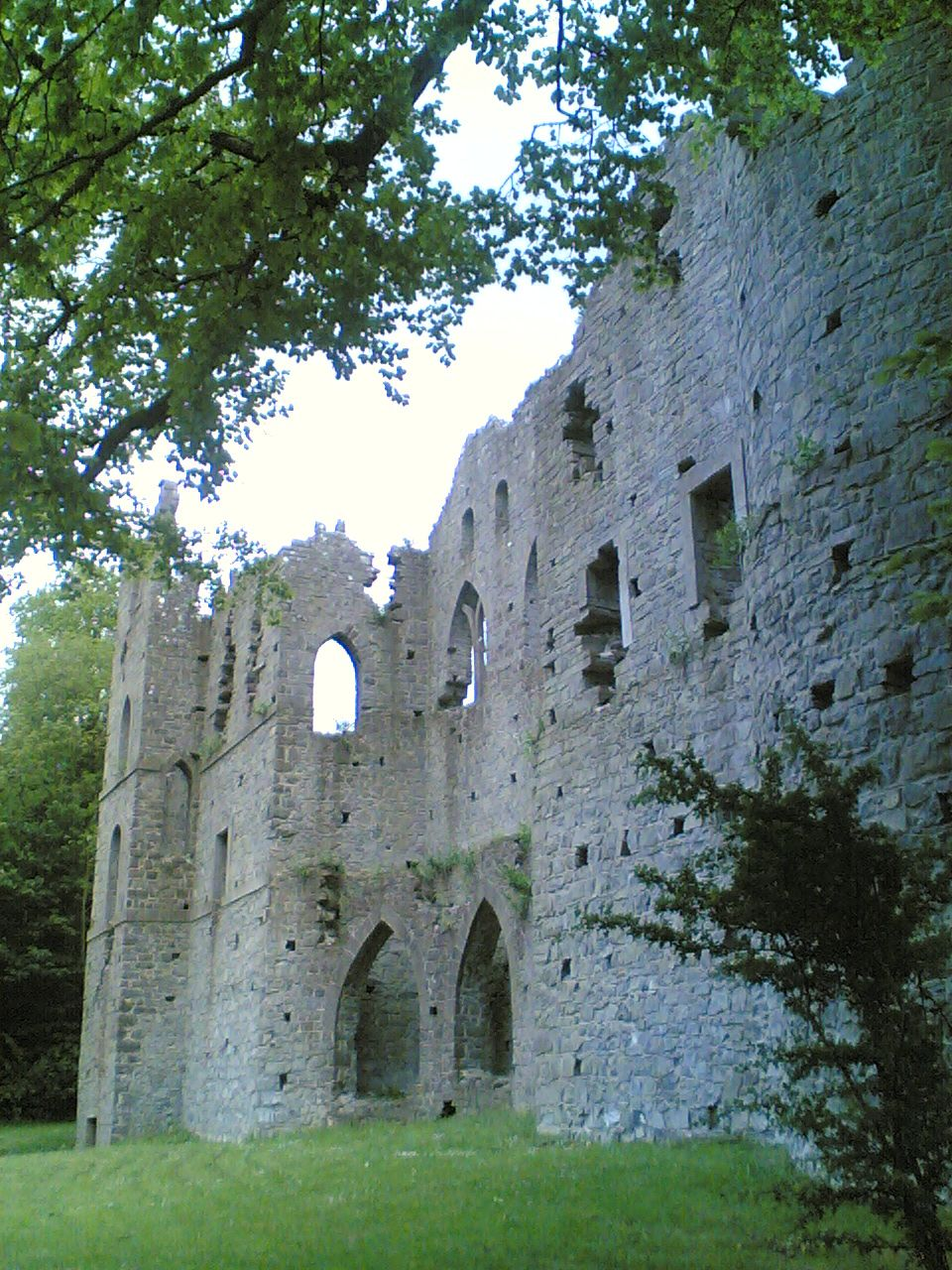
Ireland's largest folly, the Jealous Wall

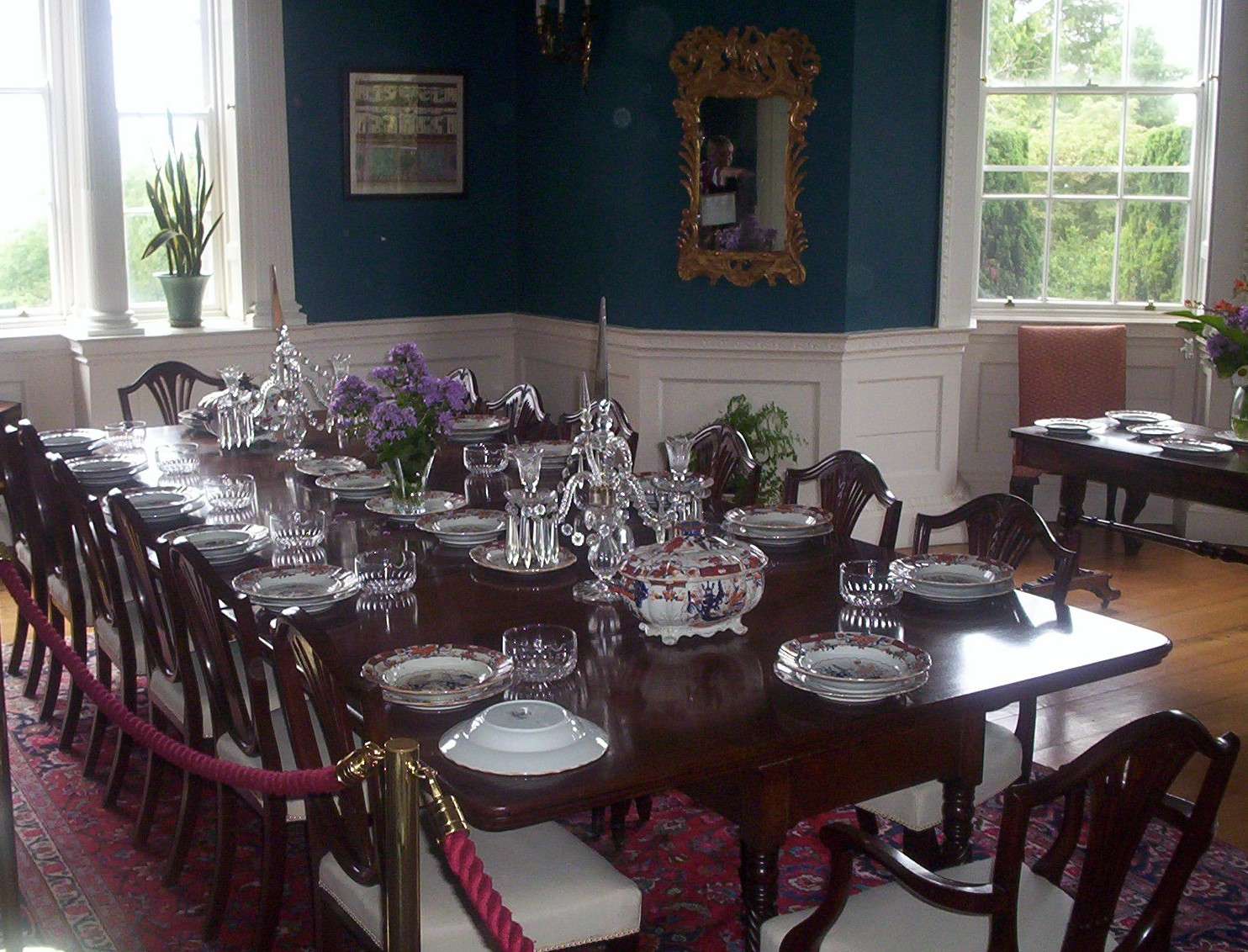
The dining room

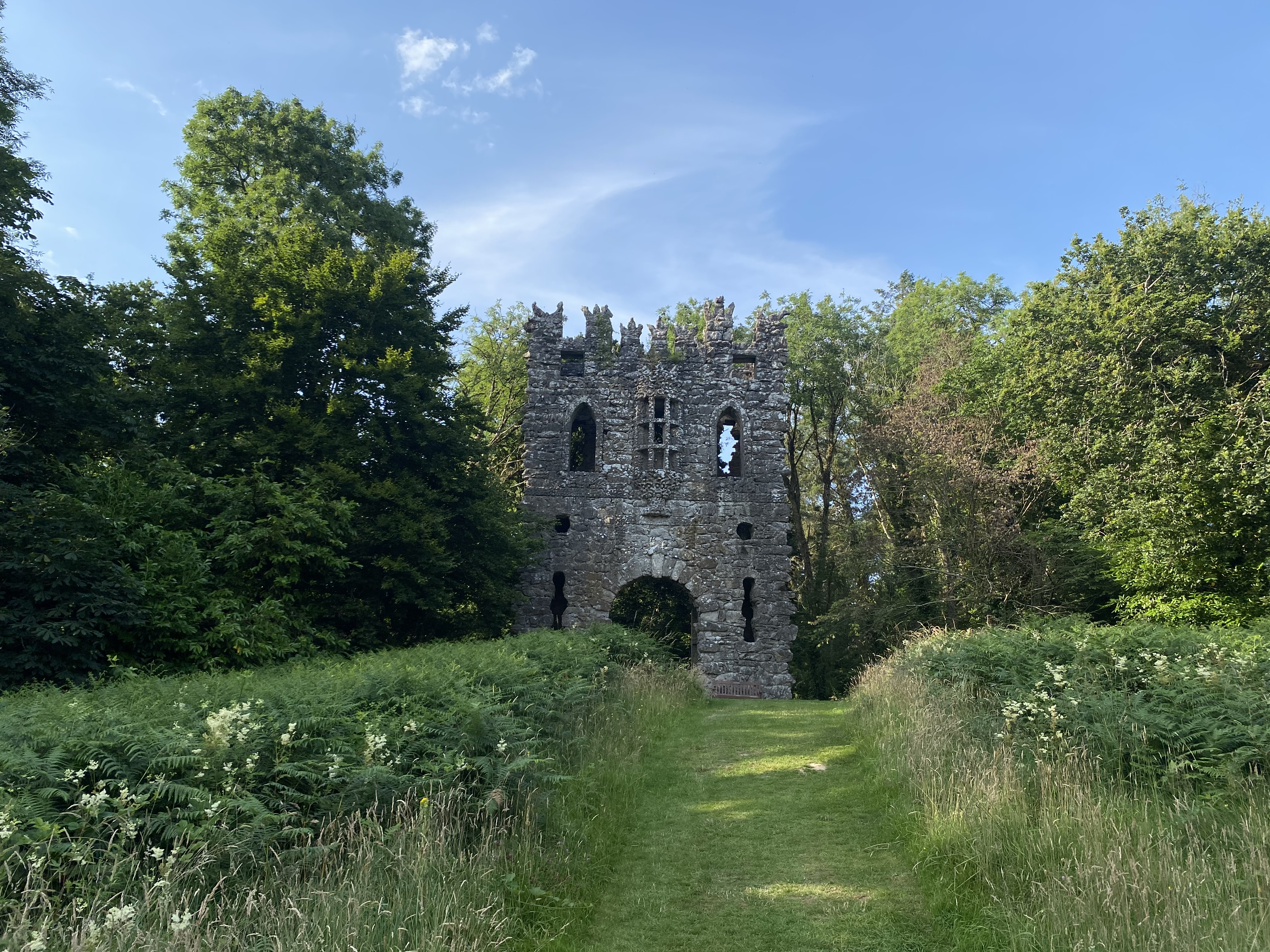
The Gothic Arch
