= Charles Howard-Bury =

British soldier, explorer, botanist and politician

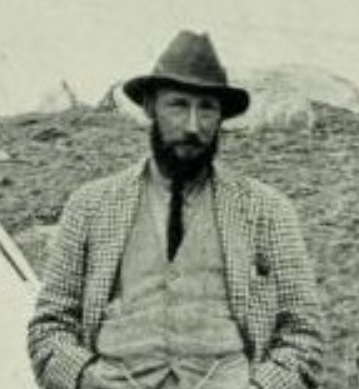

Member of Parliament for Chelmsford
- In office 30 November 1926 – 7 October 1931
- Preceded by: Henry Curtis-Bennett
- Succeeded by: Vivian Henderson

Member of Parliament for Bilston
- In office 15 November 1922 – 9 October 1924
- Preceded by: T. E. Hickman
- Succeeded by: John Baker

Personal details
- Born: 15 August 1881 Charleville Castle, King's County, Ireland (now County Offaly)
- Died: 20 September 1963 (aged 82) Mullingar, County Westmeath, Ireland
- Parents: Kenneth Howard-Bury (father); Emily Alfreda Julia Bury (mother)
- Education: Eton
- Alma mater: Royal Military College, Sandhurst
- Known for: 1921 Mount Everest reconnaissance expedition

Lieutenant-Colonel Charles Kenneth Howard-Bury DSO, DL, JP (15 August 1881 – 20 September 1963) was a British soldier, explorer, botanist and Conservative politician.

== Background and education ==
A member of the Howard family, he was born at Charleville Castle, King's County, Ireland, the only son of Captain Kenneth Howard-Bury (1846–1885), son of the Honourable James Howard. His mother was Lady Emily Alfreda Julia, daughter of Charles Bury, 3rd Earl of Charleville. His father had assumed the additional surname of Bury in 1881 after his wife succeeded to the Charleville estates. In his own right he succeeded to the estates of Charles Brinsley Marlay including Belvedere House and Bloomfield House. He was educated at Eton and the Royal Military College, Sandhurst.

== Career until 1921 ==
Howard-Bury was always interested in climbing as a youth, which led him to take up the larger routes in Austrian Alps. He joined the King's Royal Rifle Corps in 1904 and was posted to India, where he went travelling and big game-hunting. In 1905, he secretly entered Tibet without permission and was rebuked by Lord Curzon. His early travel diaries date from 1906 and show his powers of observation, encyclopaedic knowledge of natural history, and linguistic ability. At the beginning of World War I, Howard-Bury rejoined his regiment and served with distinction as a frontline officer on the Somme and throughout the conflict. He was captured during the German spring offensive of 1918, and then made an escape from his prisoner-of-war camp, before being recaptured ten days later.

== 1921 Mount Everest reconnaissance expedition ==
At the behest or Sir Francis Younghusband in 1920, Howard-Bury paved the way for the Everest Expedition. In 1921 he was the leader of the Mount Everest reconnaissance expedition, organised and financed by the Mount Everest Committee, a joint body of the Alpine Club and the Royal Geographical Society. In 1922, he wrote an account of the expedition, published as "Mount Everest The Reconnaissance, 1921".

During the 1921 expedition, Howard-Bury found many footprints at high altitude; he later pronounced that the tracks "were probably caused by a large 'loping' grey wolf", however his sherpas were quick to offer that they were the tracks of a "metch kangmi" (meaning "filthy snowman"). It was at this time that Henry Newman of The Statesman in Calcutta (now Kolkata) obtained descriptions from the expedition's porters on their return to Darjeeling. Bill Tilman has claimed that Newman mistranslated "metch kangmi" as "abominable snowman", hence the phrase "Abominable Snowman" came into existence in 1921.

Later Newman wrote in a letter to The Times "The whole story seemed such a joyous creation I sent it to one or two newspapers". Izzard adds "whatever effect Mr. Newman intended, from 1921 onwards the Yeti – or whatever various native populations choose to call it – became saddled with the description "Abominable Snowman", an appellation which can only appeal more to the music-hall mind than to mammologists, a fact which has seriously handicapped earnest seekers of the truth"

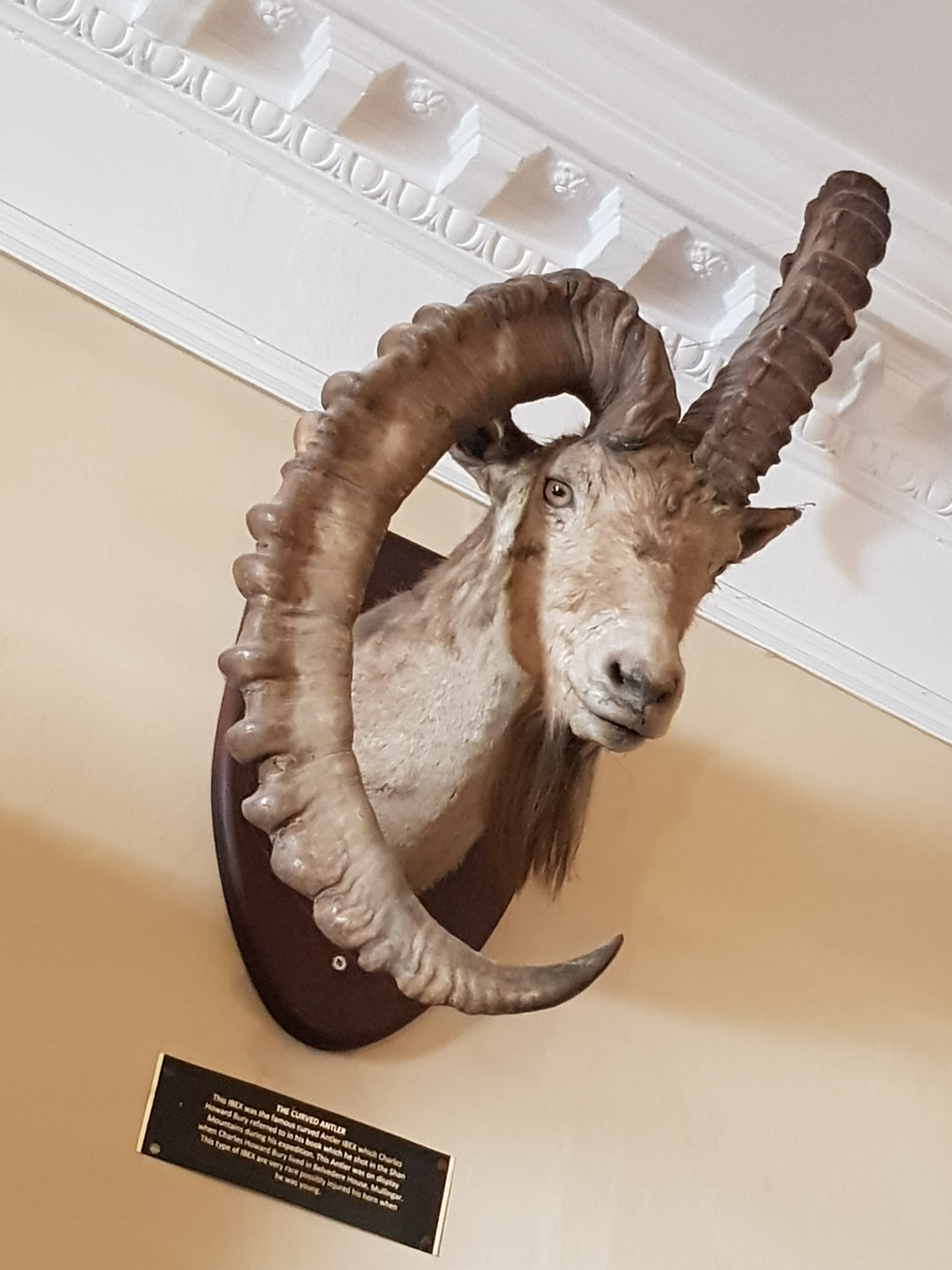
Howard-Bury's famed 'curved antler' ibex which he shot in the Tian Shan mountain range in Asia during his expedition in 1921 which is now on display in the Greville Arms Hotel in Mullingar, Ireland

He was awarded the 1922 Founder's Medal of the Royal Geographical Society for his leadership of the expedition.

== Political career ==
The Everest expedition of 1921 made Howard-Bury a public figure, and in 1922 he was elected to parliament for Bilston as Conservative. He lost his seat in 1924 but returned to the House of Commons in 1926, when he was elected for Chelmsford. He resigned in 1931. He was also a deputy lieutenant and justice of the peace for County Westmeath.

== Personal life ==
Howard-Bury died on 20 September 1963, aged 82. A bachelor homosexual, he left his Irish home Belvedere to his lover and companion of thirty years, Rex Beaumont, an actor, poet, soldier, fashion designer, and fellow philanthropist.

== Legacy ==
In 2013, British adventurers Matthew Traver and Jamie Bunchuk completed a 750-mile horse ride down the post roads of Eastern Kazakhstan in honour of the centenary of Howard-Bury's travels through the region, en route to the Tian Shan mountains in 1913.

== Arms ==
Coat of arms of Charles Howard-Bury

Notes
Granted 6 February 1882 by Sir John Bernard Burke, Ulster King of Arms.
Crest
1st a boar's head couped at the neck Or tusked Argent langued Gules transfixed through the neck by a spear Proper and charged for difference with a cross-crosslet Vert (Bury) 2nd on a chapeau Gules turned up Ermine a lion statant guardant tail extended Or ducally gorged Argent and charged on the body with a crescent also Gules for difference (Howard).
Escutcheon
Quarterly 1st & 4th Vert a cross-crosslet Or a canton Argent for difference (Bury) 2nd & 3rd Gules on a bend between six cross-crosslets fitchee Argent an escutcheon Or charged with a demi-lion rampant pierced through the mouth by an arrow within a double tressure flory counterflory of the first a crescent Sable for difference (Howard).
Motto
Virtus Sub Cruce Crescit; Nous Maintiendrons

Parliament of the United Kingdom
Preceded by T. E. Hickman	Member of Parliament for Bilston; 1922–1924	Succeeded by John Baker
Preceded by Sir Henry Curtis-Bennett	Member of Parliament for Chelmsford; 1926–1931	Succeeded by Sir Vivian Henderson
