= William Wiseman =

William Wiseman may refer to:

- Sir William Wiseman, 1st Baronet (1629–1688), English landowner and politician
- Sir William Wiseman, 8th Baronet (1814–1874), British naval officer
- Sir William Wiseman, 10th Baronet (1885–1962), grandson of the above, head of Secret Intelligence Service in Washington, DC during the First World War
- William Wiseman (sheriff of Elgin), 13th–14th century Scottish nobleman and the Sheriff of Elgin
- Willie Wiseman (1896–1979), Scottish footballer (Queen's Park and Scotland)

== See also ==
- Wiseman baronets
- William Wise (disambiguation)
