= John Ruggles-Brise =

British Army officer (1908–2007)

Colonel Sir John Archibald Ruggles-Brise, 2nd Baronet CB OBE TD KStJ DL JP (13 June 1908 – 20 February 2007) was Lord Lieutenant of Essex from 1958 to 1978, and was the first pro-chancellor of Essex University from 1964 to 1979. He was also a president of the Country Landowners' Association (now the Country Land and Business Association) from 1957 to 1959, and was a co-founder of the CLA's annual Game Fair in 1958.

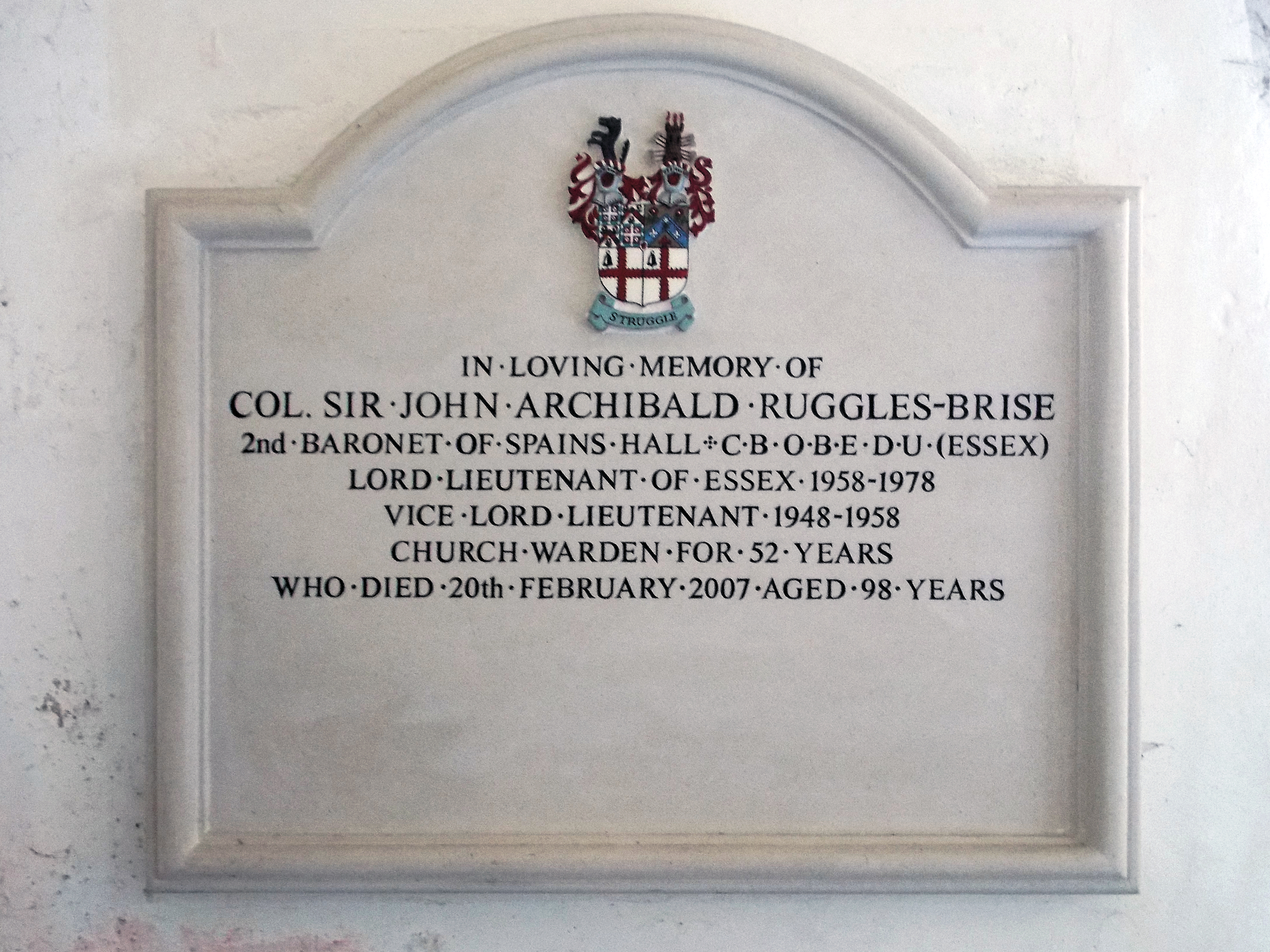
John Archibald Ruggles-Brise memorial in the Church of St John, Finchingfield, Essex

Ruggles-Brise was born at Brent Hall in Finchingfield in Essex. His family have deep roots in Essex, having been based at Spains Hall in Finchingfield since the house was bought by Samuel Ruggles, a clothier, in 1760. His father, Sir Edward Ruggles-Brise, 1st Baronet, was MP for Maldon from 1922 to his death in 1942 (with a short intermission in 1923–4), and became a baronet in George V's Silver Jubilee honours list in 1935.

Ruggles-Brise was educated at Wellesley House School, Broadstairs and Eton College, where he became captain of his house, and then worked on a family farm in Alberta in Canada. He worked at Employers Liability Assurance, rising to manage its branches in the City of London and the West End of London.

He joined the Territorial Army (TA) in 1938 (his father commanded the 104th Essex Yeomanry Field Brigade R.A.). When the Second World War broke out, he enlisted as a gunner in the 54th Anti-Aircraft Regiment. He was commissioned, and commanded a Royal Artillery anti-aircraft battery near London during the Blitz. He inherited the baronetcy on his father's death in 1942. The same year, he took command of the 180th Heavy Anti-Aircraft Regiment in 1942, based in Scotland. He took his unit to join the air defences of Plymouth before D-Day in 1944. He received a military OBE. He continued to serve with the Territorial Army after the war, being awarded the Territorial Decoration and the rank of honorary colonel.

He continued to work in insurance for a short period after the war, but then returned to manage the neglected family estates in Essex, which he had inherited in 1942. He was president of the Country Landowners' Association from 1957 to 1959, and was a co-founder of the CLA's annual Game Fair in 1958.

He was Deputy Lieutenant of Essex from 1945, vice-lieutenant from 1945, and then Lord Lieutenant of Essex from 1958 to 1978. He became a Companion of the Order of the Bath in 1958, and served as a Church Commissioner from 1959 to 1964, and as chairman of the Council of the Baronetage from 1958 to 1963. He was also a Knight of the Order of St John, and played a leading role in the foundation of Essex University at Wivenhoe Park in 1961. He was the university's first pro-chancellor from 1964 to 1979. He was a governor of Felsted School and Chigwell School from 1950 to 1975.

He never married. He was succeeded by his nephew, Sir Timothy Edward Ruggles-Brise, 3rd Baronet.

== Honours ==

Ribbon	Description	Notes
	Order of the Bath (CB)	Companion; Civil Division; 1958 Queen's Birthday Honours List
	Order of the British Empire (OBE)	Officer; Military Division
	Order of St John (K.StJ)	Knight of Justice
	Baronetcy (Bt)	1942; Inherited on the Death of His Father the 1st Baronet of Spains Hall
	Defence Medal	
	War Medal 1939–1945	
	Queen Elizabeth II Coronation Medal	1953
	Queen Elizabeth II Silver Jubilee Medal	1977; UK Version of this Medal
	Territorial Decoration (TD)	

- He was awarded the Freedom of the Borough of Chelmsford in 1967.
- He served as a deputy lieutenant of Essex from 1945. This gave him the Post Nominal Letters "DL" for life.
- He served as the Vice Lord Lieutenant from 1948 to 1958.
- He served as the Lord Lieutenant of Essex from 6 September 1958 – 1978. At which time he reverted to a DL on the retired list.
- He served as a justice of the peace in Essex. This gave him the Post Nominal Letters "JP" for Life.

Honorary titles
Preceded by Sir Francis Whitmore, Bt	Lord Lieutenant of Essex; 1958–1978	Succeeded by Sir Andrew Lewis
Baronetage of the United Kingdom
Preceded by Edward Ruggles-Brise	Baronet (of Spains Hall); 1942–2007	Succeeded by Timothy Ruggles-Brise
