= Ruggles-Brise baronets =

Baronetcy in the Baronetage of the United Kingdom

Escutcheon of the Ruggles-Brise baronets of Spains Hall

The Ruggles-Brise baronetcy, of Spains Hall in Finchingfield in the County of Essex, is a title in the Baronetage of the United Kingdom. It was created on 31 January 1935 for the Conservative politician Edward Ruggles-Brise. The second Baronet was Lord-Lieutenant of Essex from 1958 to 1978.

Guy Ruggles-Brise, younger son of the 1st Baronet, was High Sheriff of Essex between 1967 and 1968.

== Ruggles-Brise baronets, of Spains Hall (1935) ==
- Sir Edward Archibald Ruggles-Brise, 1st Baronet (1882–1942)
- Sir John Archibald Ruggles-Brise, 2nd Baronet (1908–2007)
- Sir Timothy Edward Ruggles-Brise, 3rd Baronet (born 1945), third son of the 1st Baronet.

The heir apparent is the present holder's son Archie Ruggles-Brise.
