= Edward Ruggles-Brise =

British Conservative Party politician (1882–1942)

Colonel Sir Edward Archibald Ruggles-Brise Bt MC TD JP DL
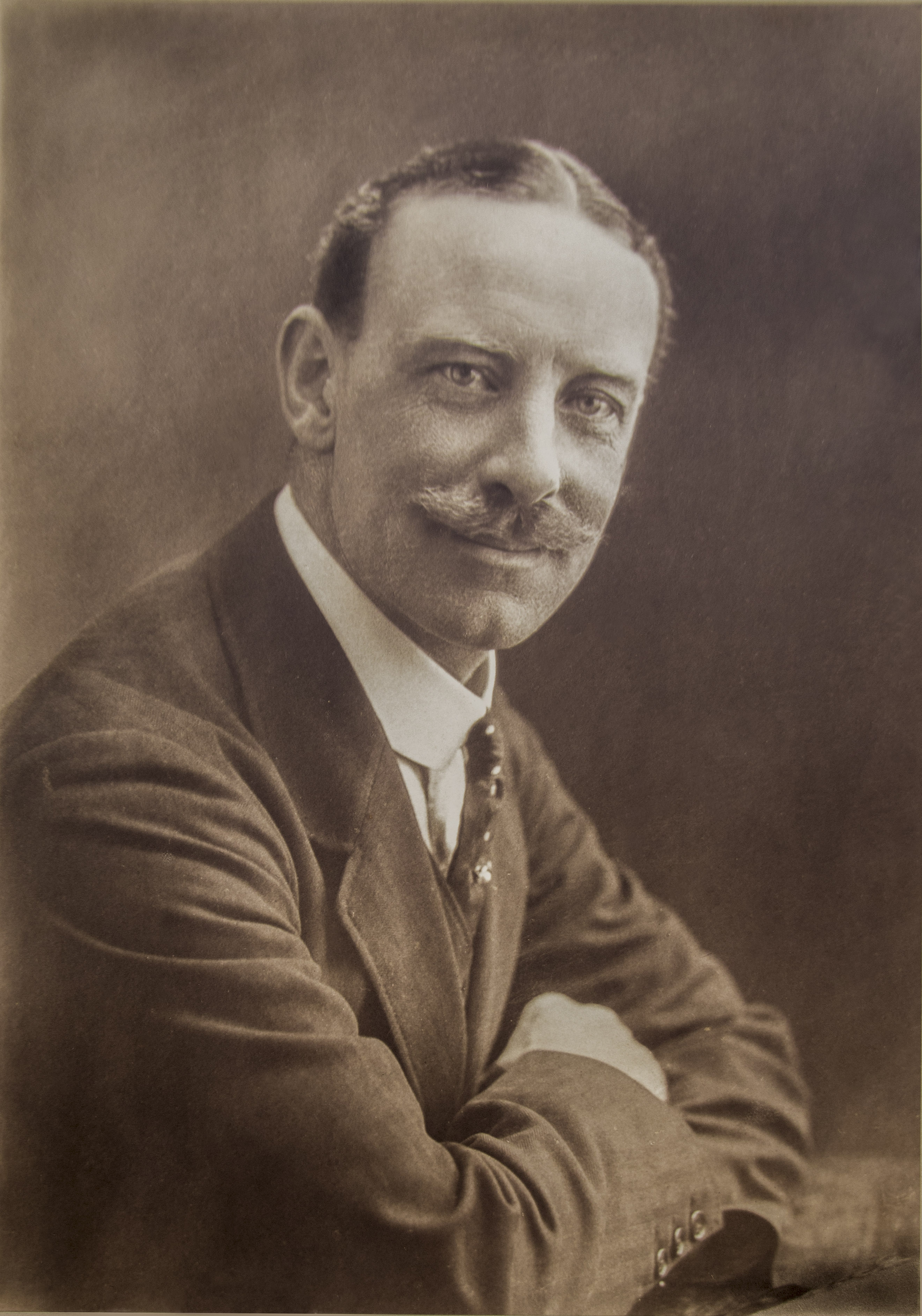

Member of Parliament for Maldon
- In office 29 October 1924 – 12 May 1942
- Preceded by: Valentine Crittall
- Succeeded by: Tom Driberg
- In office 15 November 1922 – 16 November 1923
- Preceded by: James Fortescue Flannery
- Succeeded by: Valentine Crittall

Personal details
- Born: 19 September 1882 Westminster, London, England
- Died: 12 May 1942 (aged 59)
- Party: Conservative

Colonel Sir Edward Archibald Ruggles-Brise, 1st Baronet MC TD JP DL (19 September 1882 – 12 May 1942) was a British Conservative Party politician.

== Early life ==
The son of Archibald Weyland Ruggles Brise (1857-1939), he was born at Westminster, London, in September 1882 and was educated at Eton College and Trinity College, Cambridge. At Eton, he was the captain of the football XI; in November 1871, he was selected to represent England in the fourth of the unofficial international matches against Scotland, but withdrew because of illness.

== Career ==
=== Public service ===
He was magistrate and a Deputy Lieutenant for Essex from 1920. In 1939 he was appointed as a Vice Lieutenant of Essex.

=== Political career ===
He served as Member of Parliament (MP) for the Maldon constituency in Essex from 1922 until his death in 1942, with a brief interruption from 1923 to 1924 when he narrowly lost the seat to his Labour opponent Valentine Crittall.

Ruggles-Brise was greatly interested in agricultural matters, serving on the Smallholdings Committee of Essex County Council and as Chairman of the Parliamentary Agricultural Committee.

=== Military career ===
Ruggles-Brise was appointed a second lieutenant in the Essex Yeomanry on 24 January 1903. From 1927, he commanded the 104th Essex Yeomanry Field Brigade, Royal Artillery of the Territorial Army.

== Sport ==
Ruggles-Brise was a cricketer below first-class play level. He made one appearance making 27 runs at county level for Shropshire in 1904, while playing at club level for Ellesmere.

== Personal life ==
Ruggles-Brise was a landowner and was the owner of Spains Hall in Finchingfield, Essex, which had been inherited by his father, Archibald Weyland Ruggles-Brise, on the death of his own father, the politician Samuel Ruggles-Brise.

He married twice. Firstly, in 1906, to Agatha Gurney (1881–1937), daughter of John Henry Gurney Jr., a member of the Gurney family of Keswick Hall, Norfolk. Secondly, in 1939, to Lucy Barbara Pym MBE (1895–1979), daughter of Walter Ruthven Pym, Bishop of Bombay.

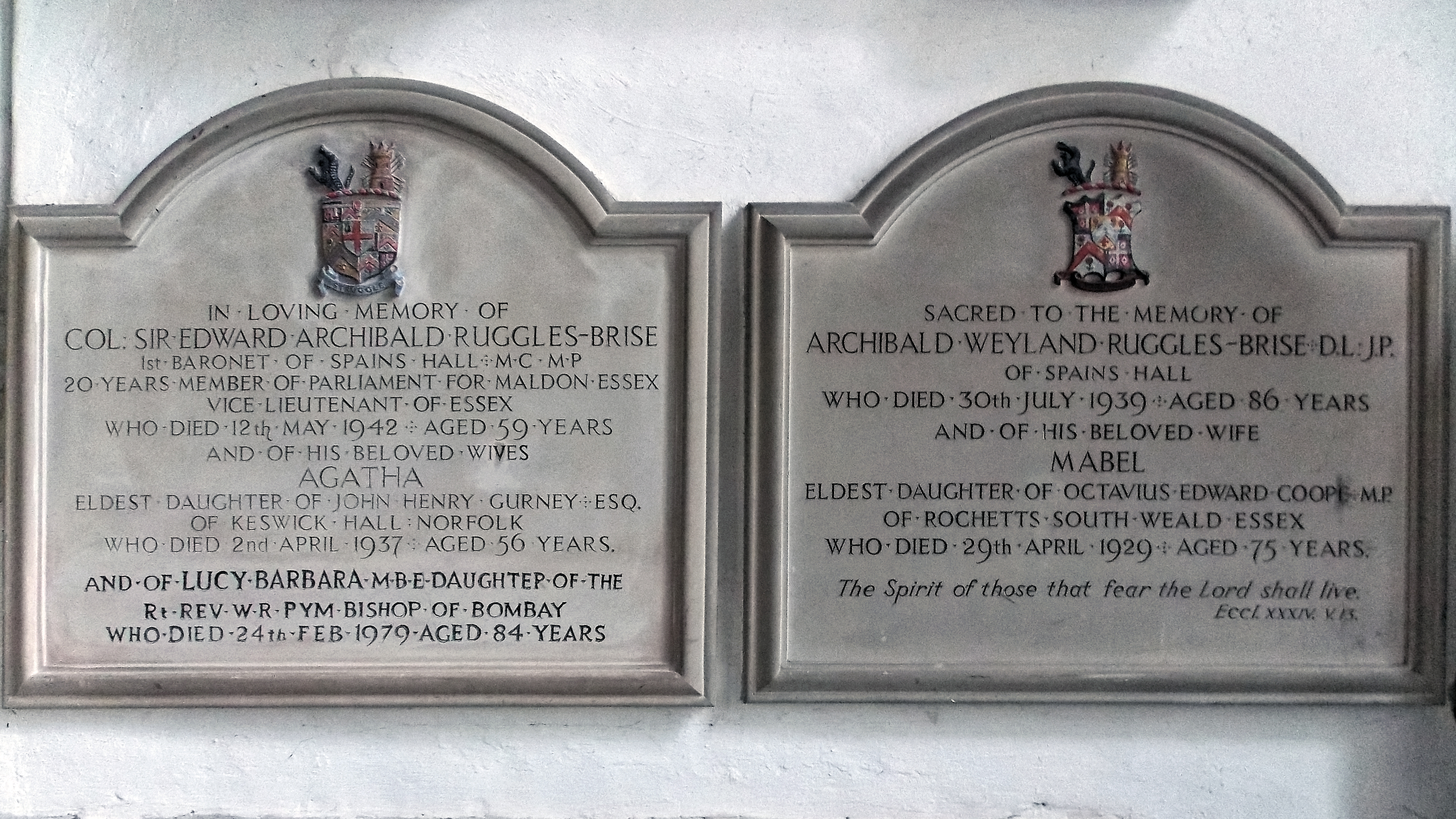
Monument to Edward Archibald Ruggles-Brise (left) in the Church of St John, Finchingfield, Essex

Following his death in May 1942 aged 59, he was succeeded in the baronetcy by his son Colonel Sir John Archibald Ruggles-Brise, 2nd Baronet.

== Honours and decorations ==
In the 1935 Jubilee Honours List, he was made a Baronet, of Spains Hall, in Essex.

== Sources ==
- Craig, F. W. S. (1983) [1969]. British parliamentary election results 1918-1949 (3rd ed.). Chichester: Parliamentary Research Services. ISBN 0-900178-06-X.
- Leigh Rayment's list of baronets
- Leigh Rayment's Historical List of MPs

Parliament of the United Kingdom
Preceded by Sir James Fortescue Flannery	Member of Parliament for Maldon; 1922–1923	Succeeded by Valentine Crittall
Preceded by Valentine Crittall	Member of Parliament for Maldon; 1924–1942	Succeeded by Tom Driberg
Baronetage of the United Kingdom
New creation	Baronet (of Spains Hall); 1935–1942	Succeeded by John Ruggles-Brise
