= John Dwyer =

John Dwyer may refer to:

- John Dwyer (Australian judge) (1879–1966), Australian judge
- John Dwyer (baseball) (active 1882), American baseball player
- John Dwyer (field hockey) (1928–2026), Australian Olympic hockey player
- John Dwyer (medicine) (born 1939), Australian professor of medicine
- John Dwyer (musician) (born 1974), American musician
- John Dwyer (Newfoundland politician) (1839–1917), Newfoundland farmer and politician
- John Dwyer (police officer) (active 2012–2016), British police officer
- John Dwyer (soldier) (1890–1962), Australian soldier
- John M. Dwyer (1935–2018), American set decorator
- John J. Dwyer (1856–1911), American architect
- Jack Dwyer (1927–1997), American football player

== See also ==
- John Dyer (disambiguation)
- John O'Dwyer (born 1991), Irish hurler
