= East Essex =

East Essex or Essex East may refer to:

- Essex East (electoral district), Ontario, Canada, 1925–1968
- East Essex (UK Parliament constituency), 1868–1885
