= John Tyrell (died 1676) =

English landowner and politician

Sir John Tyrell (1597–1676) was an English landowner and politician who sat in the House of Commons from 1661 to 1676.

Tyrell was the son of Thomas Tyrell of Ramseys, Buttsbury and his wife Margaret Filioll, daughter of John Filioll of Old Hall, Rayne. He matriculated at Wadham College, Oxford on 7 November 1617 and was awarded BA on 18 May 1620. He was a student of Inner Temple in 1620. He was knighted on 27 January 1628 and became a J.P. for Essex, holding the commission until 1641. He was ambivalent in the Civil War. In 1643 in the course of a visit to Wiltshire he went to see the King at Oxford but claimed he did not bear arms. He had to compound for £800. In 1647, he succeeded to the estate of his uncle at Heron, East Hornden, Essex. His estate was sequestrated again in 1648. In 1655 he was imprisoned at Yarmouth after Penruddock's rising.

Tyrell became J.P. again in July 1660 and remained until his death. In 1661, he was elected Member of Parliament for Maldon in the Cavalier Parliament. He was commissioner for assessment from 1661 to 1674 and was commissioner for recusants in 1675.

Tyrell died in 1676 and was buried at East Horndon on 5 April.

Tyrell married firstly Elizabeth Evelyn, daughter of George Evelyn of West Dean, Wiltshire on 14 December 1624 . They had a daughter, but she died in February 1630. He married secondly in June 1630, Martha Washington, daughter of Sir Lawrence Washington of Garsdon, Wiltshire and had four sons and a daughter. She died 17 December 1679. His eldest son John was created a baronet of Springfield in 1666 but predeceased him.

Parliament of England
Preceded by Tristram Conyers; Edward Herrys	Member of Parliament for Maldon; 1661–1676; With: Sir Richard Wiseman	Succeeded by Sir Richard Wiseman; Sir William Wiseman, 1st Baronet
