= John Dyer (disambiguation) =

John Dyer (1699–1757) was a painter and Welsh poet.

John Dyer may also refer to:

- Buddy Dyer (John Hugh Dyer, born 1958), mayor of Orlando, Florida
- Sir John Dyer, 6th Baronet (1738–1801), English soldier and courtier who was Groom of the Bedchamber to the Prince of Wales.
- John Dyer (rugby union) (born 1992), Fijian rugby union player
- John James Dyer (1809–1855), United States federal judge in Iowa
- John Lewis Dyer (1812–1901), Methodist Episcopal clergyman and one of sixteen founders of 19th century Colorado
- John Smith alias Dyer (1498/99–1571), MP for Ipswich 1547, 1553 and 1554
- John Dyer (14th-century MP), cloth merchant and member of the Parliament of England
- John Dyer (cyclist) (born 1938), Welsh cyclist

== See also ==
- John Dwyer (disambiguation)
- John Dyer Baizley, American musician and poet
- Jack Dyer (disambiguation)
- John Dye (disambiguation)
