= Joce =

Joce is a surname. Notable people with the surname include:

- Robert Joce, British slalom canoeist
- John Joce (disambiguation), multiple people
