= Richard Bush =

Richard Bush may refer to:

- Richard E. Bush (1924–2004), United States Marine and World War II Medal of Honor recipient
- Dick Bush (1931–1997), British cinematographer
- Richard Bush, founder of the Bush family and ancestor of two US presidents
- Richard C. Bush, director of Center for Northeast Asian Policy Studies of the Brookings Institution
- Richard Bush (MP) (fl. 1380s), Member of Parliament (MP) for Maldon
