= Edward Herrys =

Member of the Parliament of England

Edward Herrys (1612 - 1662) was an English lawyer and politician who sat in the House of Commons in 1660.

Herrys was the son of Edward Herrys of Great Baddow, Essex ad his wife Elizabeth Taverner, daughter of Robert Taverner of Aveley. He was baptised in September 1612. He was a student of Lincoln's Inn in 1628 and was called to the bar in 1636. He is not known to have taken any part in the Civil War. In 1648 he succeeded to the estates of his father and also became a Bencher of Lincoln's Inn. He was a commissioner for militia for Essex in March 1660. In April 1660, he was elected Member of Parliament for Maldon in a double return and the election was declared void on 14 May. At the by-election in June, he was returned as MP for Maldon to the Convention Parliament. He was a J.P. from July 1660 and a commissioner for assessment from August 1660 to 1661.

Herrys died at the age of about 49 was buried at Great Baddow on 3 March 1662.

Herrys married by licence dated 19 May 1645, Bridget Luther, widow of Thomas Luther of Kelvedon Hatch, and daughter of Thomas Glascock of Doddinghurst. They had no children.

Parliament of England
Preceded by Tristram Conyers; Henry Mildmay	Member of Parliament for Maldon; 1660; With: Tristram Conyers	Succeeded by Sir John Tyrell; Sir Richard Wiseman
