= Richard Wiseman (MP) =

Sir Richard Wiseman (1632–1712) of Torrell's Hall, Willingale, Essex was an English landowner and politician who sat in the House of Commons from 1661 to 1679.

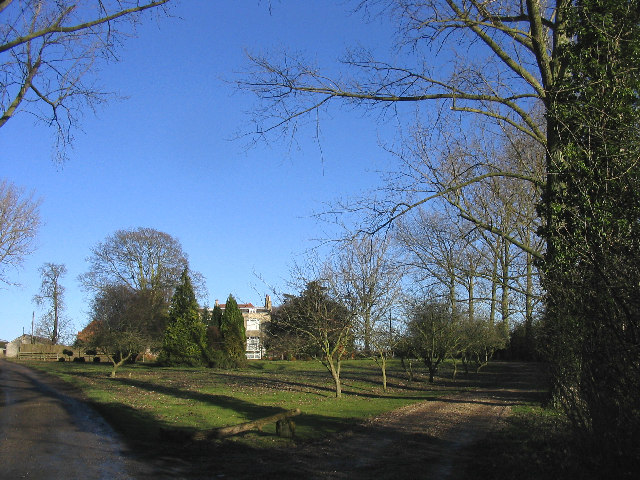
Torrell's Hall, Essex

Wiseman was born at Willingale the eldest surviving son of Sir Richard Wiseman of Torrell's Hall and his wife Lucy Griffin, daughter of Sir Thomas Griffin of Braybrooke, Northamptonshire. He was educated at Bishop's Stortford Grammar School and was admitted at Sidney Sussex College, Cambridge on 15 October 1647, aged 15. He succeeded to the estates of his father in 1654.

He was J.P. for Essex from 1656 to 1689. In 1657 he was commissioner for assessment for Essex. In March 1660, he was commissioner for militia for Essex. He was knighted on 21 June 1660. From August 1660 to 1680 he was commissioner for assessment for Essex again. In 1661, he was elected Member of Parliament for Maldon in the Cavalier Parliament. He was commissioner for corporations from 1662 to 1663. In 1675 he was commissioner for recusants and in 1677 became commissioner for assessment for Maldon and for Westminster. He was Deputy Lieutenant from April 1688 to 1689.

Wiseman died at the age of about 80 and was buried at St Anne's, Soho on 25 May 1712.

Wiseman married firstly on 2 January 1655, Elizabeth Towse, daughter of John Towse, grocer of London and had two sons, Richard and John, and three daughters, Elizabeth, Mary, and Lucy. He married secondly under licence dated 15 March 1669, Mary Abell, the daughter of Sir Thomas Wiseman of Rivenhall, Essex and widow of William Abell of East Claydon, Buckinghamshire and previously of Charles Fitch of Woodham Walter, Essex. Both his sons predeceased him and Torrell's Hall passed to his daughter, Elizabeth.

Parliament of England
Preceded by Tristram Conyers; Edward Herrys	Member of Parliament for Maldon; 1661–1679; With: Sir John Tyrell 1661–1677; Sir William Wiseman, 1st Baronet 1677–1679	Succeeded by Sir William Wiseman, 1st Baronet; Sir John Bramston
