= Roger Appleton =

Roger Appleton may refer to:

- Sir Roger Appleton, 1st Baronet (died 1614), English landowner
- Roger Appleton (MP) (by 1520–1558), for Maldon in 1558
