= Jack Dyer (disambiguation) =

Jack Dyer (1913–2003) was an Australian rules footballer

Jack Dyer may also refer to:

- Jack Dyer Jr. (born 1940), Australian rules footballer, son of Jack Dyer
- Jack Dyer (footballer, born 1991), English association footballer
- Jack Dyer (politician) (1924–2003), member of the Louisiana House of Representatives
- Jack Dyer Medal, awarded each year to the best and fairest player for the Richmond Football Club
- Jack Dyer-Lou Richards Trophy, awarded to winner of AFL games between Richmond and Collingwood Football Clubs

== See also ==
- Jack D. Crouch (1915–1989), American entrepreneur and conglomerate organizer
- Jack Dyer Crouch II (born 1958), American diplomat
- Jack Dwyer (1927–1997), American football player
- John Dyer (disambiguation)
