= Samuel Ruggles-Brise =

British politician (1825–1899)

Sir Samuel Brise Ruggles-Brise KCB DL JP (29 December 1825 – 28 May 1899) was a British Conservative politician, and owner of Spains Hall, Essex.

== Early life ==
Samuel Ruggles-Brise was the eldest son of John Ruggles (1782–1852) of Spains Hall, who adopted the additional surname of Brise, and Catherine (died 1877), daughter of John Haynes Harrison, Lord of the manor of Copford, and sister of Fiske Goodeve Fiske-Harrison, High Sheriff of Essex, who adopted the additional surname of Fiske. John Ruggles was a barrister and High Sheriff of Suffolk in 1829. Samuel was educated at Eton College and Magdalene College, Cambridge. He served in the 1st Dragoon Guards and later was Colonel Commandant of the West Essex Militia (1853–89).

== Political career ==
He was elected as a Member of Parliament for East Essex at the 1868 general election, and held the seat at two further elections before resigning from the House of Commons on 14 August 1883 by becoming Steward of the Manor of Northstead.

== Family ==
In 1847, Samuel Ruggles-Brise married Marianne Weyland Bowyer-Smith, daughter of Sir Edward Bowyer-Smijth, 10th Baronet, of Hill Hall, Essex. They had five sons and seven daughters:

- Archibald Weyland Ruggles-Brise (1853–1939), inherited Spains Hall and was father of Sir Edward Ruggles-Brise, 1st Baronet.
- Sir Evelyn John Ruggles-Brise (1857–1935) was a prison administrator and founder of the Borstal system.
- Captain Cecil Edward Ruggles-Brise (1859–88), Duke of Wellington's Regiment.
- Reginald Francis Ruggles-Brise (1860–1920).
- Major General Sir Harold Goodeve Ruggles-Brise (1864–1927), Grenadier Guards, fought in the Second Boer War and World War I, ending his career as Military Secretary to Sir Douglas Haig.
- Adella Marianne Ruggles-Brise (died 1930).
- Edith Cecilia Ruggles-Brise (died 1931), married Captain James Angernon Ind (died 1915).
- Constance Sophia Ruggles-Brise (died 1928), W. Hunter Rodwell.
- Alice Catherine Ruggles-Brise (died 1911).
- Rosalind Letitia Ruggles-Brise (died 1930), married Edward Kensit Norman (died 1902).
- Florence Ada Ruggles-Brise.
- Beatrice Georgiana Ruggles-Brise married Herbert Jervis-White-Jervis, a son of Henry Jervis-White-Jervis (died 1934)

== Notes ==
Parliament of the United Kingdom
New constituency	Member of Parliament for East Essex; 1868 – 1883; With: James Round	Succeeded by Charles Hedley Strutt; James Round
