= John Glover (MP) =

Member of the Parliament of England

John Glover (died after 1418) was a cloth merchant and member of the Parliament of England for the constituency of Maldon in Essex in the parliaments of 1386, 1393, and January 1397. He was elected bailiff of Maldon nine times and also acted as an overseer of repairs to Hey bridge in 1389.
