= Roger Appleton (MP) =

16th-century English politician

Roger Appleton (by 1520 – 1558), of Dartford, Kent and South Benfleet, Essex, was an English politician. He was a Member (MP) of the Parliament of England for Maldon in 1558.

Parliament of England
Preceded by Sir Henry Radclyffe; Richard Weston	Member of Parliament for Maldon; 1558; With: Edmund Tyrrell	Succeeded by Humphrey Radcliffe; Henry Golding
