= Richard Bawde =

English politician

Richard Bawde (fl. 1394–1441) was an English politician. He sat as MP for Maldon in May 1421.

He also served as ale taster of Maldon from January 1399 till 1400, 1440 till 1401 and 1401 till 1403; wardman from 1404 till 1405, 1406 till 1410, 1417 till 1418, 1420 till 1421, 1424 till 1425, 1426 till 1429, 1431 till 1434, 1435 till 1437 and 1438 till 1445; warden of leather from 1405 till 1406, 1408 till 1409, 1414 till 1415 and 1428 till 1429; weigher of bread from 1416 till 1417; clerk of the market from 1417 till 1418, 1424 till 1425 and 1431 till 1432; constable from 1418 till 1419 and 1423 till 1424; chamberlain from 1419 till 1420, 1421 till 1422, 1433 till 1434 and 1435 till 1436; and assessor of taxes from 1431 till 1433, 1435 till 1436 and 1440 till 1441.

He was the second son of John Bawde and the younger brother of Roger Bawde. He married and had one son.
