= John Dye =

John Dye may refer to:

- John H. Dye (1833–1906), American civil engineer
- John Dye (cricketer) (born 1942), English cricketer
- John Dye (actor) (1963–2011), American actor

== See also ==
- John Dyer (disambiguation)
