= Charles Hedley Strutt =

British politician

Charles Hedley Strutt (18 April 1849 – 19 December 1926) was a British Conservative Party politician.

He was the son of John James Strutt, the 2nd Baron Rayleigh, and his wife Clara née Vicars. He was educated at Winchester College and at Trinity College, Cambridge, where he graduated in 1871 with 1st class honours in moral science. He became a farmer in Essex, where he was a justice of the peace, and an alderman of Essex County Council.

He was the Member of Parliament for Eastern Essex from 1883 to 1885, when the constituency was divided. At the 1885 general election he unsuccessfully contested the Saffron Walden division of Essex.

After a decade's absence, he returned to the House of Commons as MP for Maldon in Essex from 1895 to 1906.

When not involved in politics he had interests in rubber production and was chairman of the Anglo-Dutch Plantations of Java.

Parliament of the United Kingdom
Preceded by James Round; Samuel Ruggles-Brise	Member of Parliament for East Essex; 1883 – 1885; With: James Round	Constituency abolished
Preceded by Cyril Dodd	Member of Parliament for Maldon; 1895 – 1906	Succeeded by Thomas Robert Bethell
