= John Butler (died 1613) =

English politician

John Butler (died c. 1613), of Sharnbrook, Bedfordshire and Thoby, Essex, was an English politician. He was a member (MP) of the parliament of England for Maldon in 1586 and 1589.
