= Cyril Dodd =

English barrister and politician

Member of Parliament for Maldon, Essex
- In office 4 July 1892 – 13 July 1895
- Preceded by: Charles Wing Gray
- Succeeded by: Charles Hedley Strutt

Personal details
- Born: c. 1844
- Died: 29 January 1913
- Party: Liberal

Cyril Joseph Settle Dodd (c. 1844 - 29 January 1913) was a British Liberal Party politician who served as Member of Parliament for Maldon in Essex in the 25th Parliament between 1892 and 1895.

Dodd was first elected at the 1892 general election.
