= James Fortescue Flannery =

British politician

Flannery in 1895.

Sir James Fortescue Flannery, 1st Baronet (16 December 1851 – 5 October 1943) was an English engineer and naval architect, and Liberal Unionist (later Conservative Party) politician.

Flannery was born in Liverpool, the son of Capt. John Flannery of Seacombe. Educated at the Liverpool College of Science and Victoria University, he worked in Birkenhead and was subsequently engaged by Sir Edward J Reid KCS later Chief Constructor of H.M Navy. He was head of Flannery, Baggally & Johnson Marine Engineering, which eventually opened offices in London, Liverpool and Rotterdam. and a Director of London and South Western Bank. Between 1900 and 1906 he was President of the Railway Clerks' Association. He was President of the Institute of Marine Engineers 1914, and later President of the Society of Consulting Engineers 1931.

He was appointed J.P for Surrey 1892, for Kent in 1895, knighted in 1899, and appointed JP for Essex in 1904.

He was elected at the 1895 general election as Member of Parliament for Shipley in West Yorkshire, holding the seat until the 1906 general election. He returned to Parliament at the January 1910 election as Conservative Party MP for Maldon in Essex.

In the latter constituency he fought the 1918 election as a Coalition Conservative candidate, winning with a majority of 1823, but passing the baton over to Edward Ruggles-Brise for the 1922 election.

Created a baronet in 1904, of Wethersfield Manor, Essex, he was also Lord of the Manor of Wethersfield. In 1882 he married Edith Mary Emma, daughter of Osborn Jenkyn of Ealing who predeceased him by eight years. Flannery died in October 1943 aged 91 leaving an estate valued at over £400,000, £150,000 being paid in tax. His son Sir Harold (born 1883) was given a life interest in the estate and provision was made through a trust fund for daughters Kathleen Edith (Hartridge) and Enid Fortescue (Lindsay). The family sold the Wethersfield property in 1957. The terms of Flannery's will display a remarkable concern about premature burial with clear instructions as to how his body should be treated prior to interment.

== Sources ==
- Essex in the 20th Century, WT Pike & Co.: London (1909).
- Historical list of MPs: M (part 1)^{[usurped]}
- Historical list of MPs: S (part 3)^{[usurped]}

Parliament of the United Kingdom
Preceded by Sir William Byles	Member of Parliament for Shipley; 1895–1906	Succeeded by Percy Illingworth
Preceded by Sir Thomas Bethell	Member of Parliament for Maldon; Jan. 1910–1922	Succeeded by Edward Ruggles-Brise
Baronetage of the United Kingdom
New creation	Baronet (of Wethersfield Manor, Essex); 1904–1943	Succeeded by Harold Fortescue Flannery
Trade union offices
Preceded by W. D. Leaver	President of the Railway Clerks' Association; 1900–1906	Succeeded by William J. West
