= John Crakebon =

John Crakebon (died after 1403) was a member of the Parliament of England for the constituency of Maldon in Essex in multiple parliaments from January 1377 to 1399. He was also bailiff, wardman, and constable of Maldon. He was tax collector of Essex in 1384.
