= Henry Hales =

Member of the Parliament of England

Henry Hales (died after 1389) was a member of the Parliament of England for the constituency of Maldon in Essex in the parliaments of 1373, January 1377 and February 1388. He was also bailiff of Maldon in 1386–87 and wardman in 1387–1399.
