= Thomas Bethell =

British politician and barrister

Bethell in 1906

Sir Thomas Robert Bethell (8 May 1867 – 23 December 1957) was a British barrister and Liberal Party politician. He was Liberal MP for Maldon, Essex from 1906–10.

== Background ==
Bethell was born in Grange-over-Sands, Lancashire, the son of George Bethell of South Woodford and Frances Tipper. He was educated at Heversham Grammar School, Cumberland and King's College London. He settled in his native South Woodford, before moving to Kensington. He was knighted in 1914. He married Edith Lillie Tabor in 1925. Edith Lillie, Lady Bethell died 8 November 1957. His elder brother was the politician John Bethell, who was created a baronet in 1911 and Baron Bethell in 1922.

== Professional career ==
After qualifying as a barrister, Bethell was called to the Bar at Middle Temple in 1897. Thereafter he joined the South-Eastern Circuit. He served as Deputy-Chairman of the County of London Electric Supply Co. Ltd, and a Director of other Associated and Subsidiary Companies until those companies were nationalised.

== Political career ==
Bethell was Liberal candidate for the Maldon division of Essex at the 1906 General Election. The Liberals had not won Maldon since 1892. He gained the seat from the Conservatives as part of the national tide running in the Liberal favour. In parliament he was a member of the Select committee on the Rural Housing Bill. He sought re-election at Maldon at the January 1910 general election but was defeated by the Conservative. He did not contest the general election later that year not the following three general elections. In October 1924 he contested the Eye, Suffolk constituency at the general election. Eye had been a Liberal seat from 1885 to 1923. At the 1923 election a Labour candidate had intervened and split the anti-Conservative vote. Like his predecessor, he also faced a Labour opponent as well as the sitting Conservative. At this election the national tide was running against the Liberals and he finished in second place. He did not stand for parliament again.

=== Electoral record ===
General election 1906: Maldon
| Party | Candidate | Votes | % | ±% |
|---|---|---|---|---|
| Liberal | Thomas Robert Bethell | 4,773 | 50.8 | +9.3 |
| Conservative | Hon. Charles Hedley Strutt | 4,624 | 49.2 | −9.3 |
| Majority | | 149 | 1.6 | |
| Turnout | | | 88.5 | +9.1 |
| Liberal gain from Conservative | | Swing | | |

General election January 1910: Maldon
| Party | Candidate | Votes | % | ±% |
|---|---|---|---|---|
| Conservative | James Fortescue Flannery | 5,691 | 54.1 | +4.9 |
| Liberal | Thomas Robert Bethell | 4,822 | 45.9 | −4.9 |
| Majority | | 869 | 8.2 | +9.8 |
| Turnout | | | 91.3 | +2.8 |
| Conservative gain from Liberal | | Swing | +4.9 | |

General election 1924: Eye
| Party | Candidate | Votes | % | ±% |
|---|---|---|---|---|
| Unionist | William Vanneck | 13,450 | 53.3 | +5.6 |
| Liberal | Thomas Robert Bethell | 7,441 | 29.5 | −10.0 |
| Labour | Charles Wye Kendall | 4,329 | 17.2 | +4.4 |
| Majority | | 6,009 | 23.8 | +15.6 |
| Turnout | | 25,220 | 74.5 | +3.6 |
| Registered electors | | 33,841 | | |
| Unionist hold | | Swing | +7.8 | |

Parliament of the United Kingdom
| Preceded by Charles Hedley Strutt | Member of Parliament for Maldon; 1906–January 1910 | Succeeded by James Fortescue Flannery |
