= Thomas Paffe =

Thomas Paffe (died 1432) was a member of the Parliament of England for the constituency of Maldon in Essex in the parliaments of 1402, January 1404, and 1417.
