= John Page (MP for Maldon) =

MP for Maldon

John Page (died after 1417) was a member of the Parliament of England for the constituency of Maldon in Essex in the parliaments of 1391, 1402, and 1407.
