= John Skinner (MP for Maldon) =

John Skinner (died after 1395) was a member of the Parliament of England for the constituency of Maldon in Essex in the parliaments of January 1390 and 1393.
