= William Wise =

William Wise or Bill Wise may refer to:

- William Furlong Wise (1784–1844), British naval officer
- Bill Wise (baseball) (1861–1940), American baseball player
- William Wise (author) (born 1923), American author of children's literature
- Willie Wise (born 1947), American basketball player
- Willy Wise (born 1967), American boxer
- William Wise III (born 1992), American basketball player
- Bill Wise, American actor

== See also ==
- William Wiseman (disambiguation)
