= Arthur Kitching (politician) =

British politician (1840–1919)

Albert George Kitching (28 December 1840 – 3 November 1919) was an English stockbroker and a Liberal politician.

Kitching was the son of George Kitching, a doctor of Enfield, Middlesex, and Mary Ann Belts. He was educated privately and became a member of the London Stock Exchange. He was governor of Enfield Grammar School and a J.P. for Middlesex. Kitching married Honoria Lydia Woolley in 1864.

Kitching stood unsuccessfully at Malmesbury in the 1880 general election. In the 1885 general election, Kitching was elected Member of Parliament for Maldon but lost the seat in the 1886 general election.

Kitching died at the age of 78.

Parliament of the United Kingdom
Preceded by George Courtauld	Member of Parliament for Maldon; 1885–1886	Succeeded by Charles Wing Gray
