= Richard Galon =

English politician

Richard Galon (fl. 1407 – 1433) was an English politician. He sat as MP for Maldon in May 1413, 1419, 1420, 1422, 1423, 1425, 1426, 1431 and 1433.
