= James Round =

British politician (1842–1916)

Round in 1895.

James Round PC JP (6 April 1842 – 25 December 1916) was a British Conservative politician and first-class cricketer.

Round was born at Colchester, the son of Rev. James Thomas Round and his wife Louisa Barlow. His father was Rector of St. Runwald's and St. Nicholas, Colchester, and prebendary of Broomesbury. Round was educated at Eton College and Christ Church, Oxford. He played cricket for Oxford University in 1864, and for Marylebone Cricket Club (MCC) from 1865 to 1869. He played 34 innings in 22 first-class matches with a highest score of 142 and an average of 16.85. Round played for a number of clubs and additional sides including Gentlemen of Essex, Bishops Stortford, Chelmsford, I Zingari, Lord Sandwich's Eleven, and Essex.

In 1867 Round inherited Birch Hall, Essex from his uncle Charles Gray Round, MP for North Essex. In 1868 he was elected Member of Parliament (MP) for East Essex. He played cricket for Houses of Parliament teams in 1879. When the seat was reorganised in 1885, he was elected as MP for Harwich, and held the seat until 1906. He was sworn of the Imperial Privy Council on 11 August 1902, following an announcement of the King's intention to make this appointment in the 1902 Coronation Honours list published in June that year.

Round was also a Justice of the Peace and alderman for Essex County Council. Round died at Birch Hall at the age of 74.

His son Charles Round played cricket for Essex.

Parliament of the United Kingdom
New constituency	Member of Parliament for East Essex; 1868–1885; With: Samuel Ruggles-Brise 1868–1883; Charles Hedley Strutt 1883–1885	Constituency abolished
Preceded by Sir Henry Tyler	Member of Parliament for Harwich; 1885–1906	Succeeded by Arthur Lever
