= Valentine Crittall, 1st Baron Braintree =

British politician and businessman

The Right Honourable The Lord Braintree JP
- By Elliot & Fry, 1948

Member of Parliament for Maldon
- In office 6 December 1923 – 9 October 1924
- Preceded by: Edward Ruggles-Brise
- Succeeded by: Edward Ruggles-Brise

Personal details
- Born: 28 June 1884
- Died: 21 May 1961 (aged 76)

Valentine George Crittall, 1st Baron Braintree, JP (28 June 1884 – 21 May 1961) was a British politician and businessman who served briefly as a Labour Member of Parliament before later joining the Conservatives.

== Background ==
Crittall was born at Braintree, the son of Essex businessman Francis Henry Crittall, founder of the Crittall window company, and Ellen Laura Carter. Crittall was educated at Framlingham College in Suffolk.

== Political career ==
Crittall was elected as Labour Member of Parliament for the Essex constituency of Maldon in the 1923 general election by a majority of only 49 votes over the sitting Conservative MP Lt Col Edward Ruggles-Brise, and served as Parliamentary Private Secretary to Lord Thomson, the Minister of Air. He was defeated by Ruggles-Brise in the 1924 general election, and knighted in 1930. He was elevated to the peerage in 1948, as Baron Braintree, of Braintree in the County of Essex, and was a director of the Bank of England from 1948 to 1955. He was also a justice of the peace (magistrate) for Essex.

== Silver End ==
In 1926, Crittall founded the model Village of Silver End, near Braintree in Essex. Built as a "garden village" to provide accommodation for the people who worked in the Crittall family's growing factories, the village has been described as "a wonder of its time": its motto is "Why not?"

== Family ==
Crittall was married three times: to Olive Lillian MacDermott, in 1915; to Lydia Mabel Revy in 1933; and to Phyllis Dorothy Cloutman, in 1955. He died aged 76 in 1961, without male children, and his barony therefore became extinct.

== Arms ==
Coat of arms of Valentine Crittall, 1st Baron Braintree
Crest Within a mascle Sable a sun in splendour Or. Escutcheon Argent fretty Sable on a chief Gules two fleurs-de-lys of the first. Supporters Dexter a blacksmith holding in the exterior hand a hammer; sinister a glazier holding in the exterior hand a file all Proper. Motto Why Not?

Parliament of the United Kingdom
Preceded by Edward Ruggles-Brise	Member of Parliament for Maldon; 1923–1924	Succeeded by Edward Ruggles-Brise
Peerage of the United Kingdom
New creation	Baron Braintree; 1948–1961	Extinct
