= John Welles (died 1418) =

John Welles (died 1418) was a merchant who traded with Middleburg in the Netherlands, in bitumen, timber and cloth. He was a member of the Parliament of England for the constituency of Maldon in Essex in the parliaments of September 1388 and 1391. He was also bailiff of Maldon nine times. He was tax collector of Essex in 1407.
