= John Joce =

John Joce may refer to:

- John Joce (MP for Maldon) (fl.1390-1399)
- John Joce (MP for Newcastle-under-Lyme) (fl.1402)
