= Charles Wing Gray =

Former British Conservative Party Politician

Charles Wing Gray (1845 – 23 November 1920) was a British farmer and a Conservative Party politician.

He was the Member of Parliament for Maldon in Essex from 1886 to 1892.

From 1885 to 1890 he served as a captain in the 2nd Volunteer Battalion of the Essex Regiment.

Parliament of the United Kingdom
Preceded by Arthur Kitching	Member of Parliament for Maldon; 1886–1892	Succeeded by Cyril Dodd
