= Cornish Hall End =

Village in Essex, England

Coordinates: 52.00°N 0.451°E

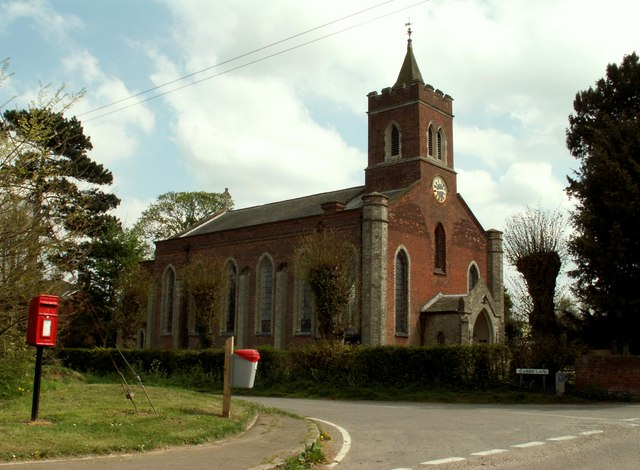
- Parish church of St. John The Evangelist

- Location within Essex
- OS grid reference: TL683364
- Civil parish: Finchingfield
- District: Braintree
- Shire county: Essex
- Region: East
- Country: England
- Sovereign state: United Kingdom
- Post town: BRAINTREE
- Postcode district: CM7
- Dialling code: 01799

Cornish Hall End is a village on the B1057 road three miles north of Finchingfield and 4 miles (6 km) south of Steeple Bumpstead,{[cn|date=August 2026}} in the civil parish of Finchingfield, in the Braintree district of Essex, England. The main part of the village is a ribbon development of about 60 houses on either side of the road with many outlying farms, hamlets and individual houses.

It is approximately 11 miles (18 km) from Braintree, Great Dunmow and Saffron Walden, and about 7 miles (11 km) from Haverhill in Suffolk.

Cornish Hall End is served by a Parish Council which also represents Finchingfield.

Its neighbouring villages are Finchingfield, Stambourne, and the Sampfords (Great Sampford and Little Sampford). Near the village at Herkstead Hall Farm is one of the sources of the River Colne, Essex. It was one of the places studied in the Survey of English Dialects. It is also situated in the small region where the flora Oxlip grows.

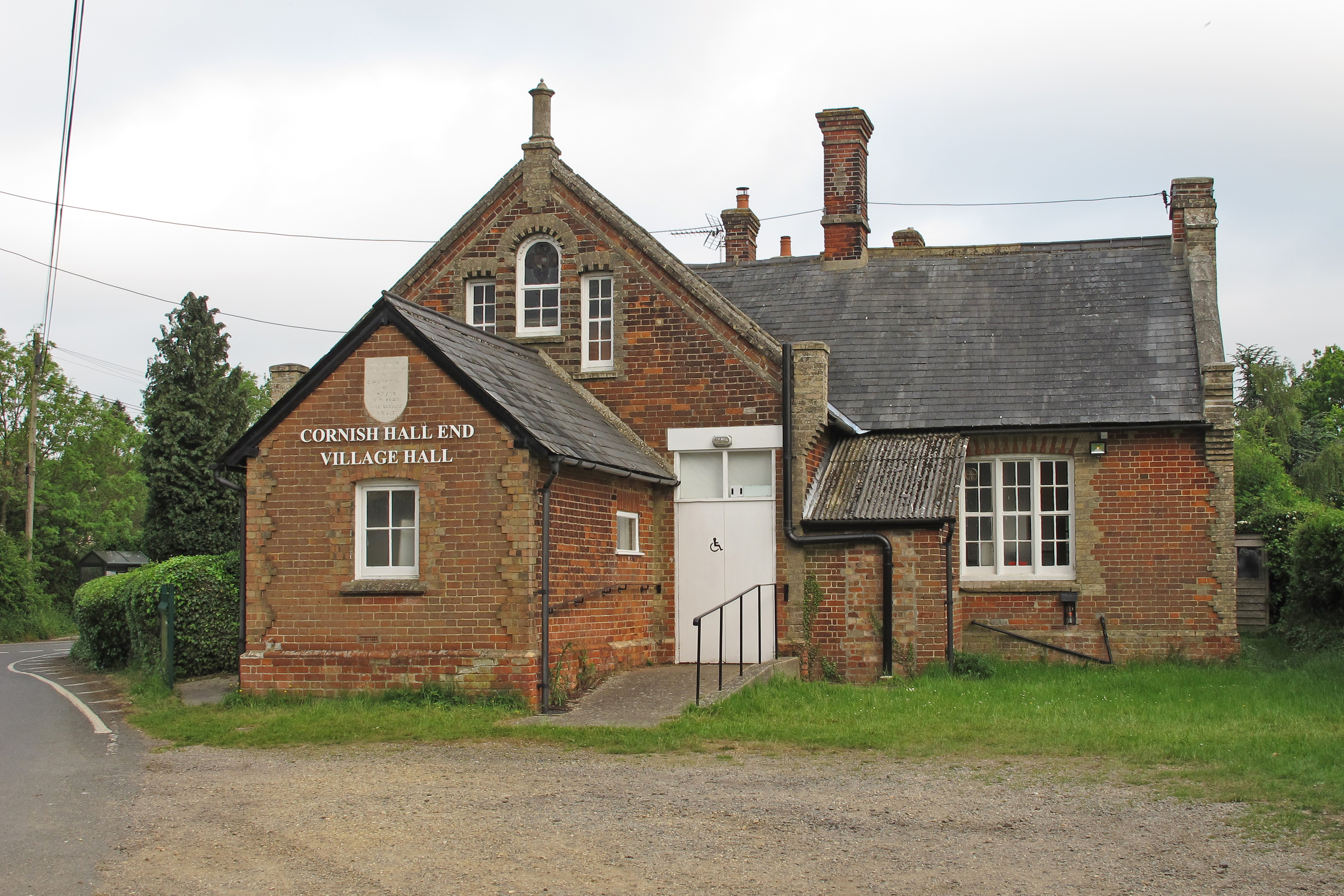
Cornish Hall End Village Hall
