= William Bennett (MP for Maldon) =

English politician

William Bennett (fl. 1419–1421) was an English politician. He sat as MP for Maldon in 1419.

In the elections held for the Parliament of May 1421 he stood surety for John Cooper.
