= Wiseman baronets =

Title in the Baronetage of England

There have been three baronetcies created for persons with the surname Wiseman, all in the Baronetage of England. Only one creation is extant as of 2008.

The Wiseman Baronetcy, of Canfield Hall in the County of Essex, was created in the Baronetage of England on 29 August 1628 for William Wiseman. Both he and the second Baronet served as high sheriff of Essex. The seventh Baronet was a captain in the Royal Navy. The eighth Baronet was a rear-admiral in the Royal Navy. The ninth Baronet was also a captain in the Royal Navy. The tenth Baronet was an intelligence agent and banker.

John Wiseman, great-grandfather of the first Baronet, was one of the auditors for Henry VIII, and acquired the family seat of Canfield Hall in Essex.

The Wiseman Baronetcy, of Thundersley in the County of Essex, was created in the Baronetage of England on 18 December 1628 for Richard Wiseman. The title became extinct on his death in circa 1654.

The Wiseman Baronetcy, of Rivenhall in the County of Essex, was created in the Baronetage of England on 15 June 1660 for William Wiseman, who later represented Maldon in the House of Commons. The title became extinct on his death in 1688.

== Wiseman baronets, of Canfield Hall (1628) ==
Escutcheon of the Wiseman baronets of Canfield Hall

- Sir William Wiseman, 1st Baronet (died 1643)
- Sir William Wiseman, 2nd Baronet (c. 1630–1685)
- Sir Thomas Wiseman, 3rd Baronet (died 1731)
- Sir Charles Wiseman, 4th Baronet (1676–1751)
- Sir William Wiseman, 5th Baronet (died 1774)
- Sir Thomas Wiseman, 6th Baronet (1731–1810)
- Sir William Saltonstall Wiseman, 7th Baronet (1784–1845)
- Sir William Saltonstall Wiseman, 8th Baronet (1814–1874)
- Sir William Wiseman, 9th Baronet (1845–1893)
- Sir William George Eden Wiseman, 10th Baronet (1885–1962)
- Sir John William Wiseman, 11th Baronet (born 1957)

The heir presumptive is the present baronet's fifth cousin once removed, Jonathan Charles Wiseman (born 1953), a fifth-great-grandson of the sixth baronet. The next in line is his brother Richard Christopher Wiseman (born 1954), whose elder son is Christopher Phillip Wiseman (born 1987), who is married and has a son, Luke James Wiseman (born 2015).

== Wiseman baronets, of Thundersley (1628) ==
- Sir Richard Wiseman, 1st Baronet (c. 1601–c. 1654)

== Wiseman baronets, of Rivenhall (1660) ==
- Sir William Wiseman, 1st Baronet (c. 1629 – 1688)
