= John Joce (MP for Maldon) =

Member of the Parliament of England

John Joce (fl. 1390–1399) was an English landowner and cloth merchant. He held the manor of Great Wenden, Essex.

Joce was one of the two Members of the Parliament of England for Maldon in January 1390, January 1397, and 1399, at a time when parliamentary sessions were short.
