= Henry Golding (died 1576) =

English politician

Henry Golding (died 1576), of Little Birch, Essex, was an English politician.

He was a member (MP) of the parliament of England for Maldon in 1558 and 1559 and for Colchester in 1571 and 1572.
