= John Dyer (14th-century MP) =

Member of the Parliament of England

John Dyer (died after 1403) was a cloth merchant and member of the Parliament of England for the constituency of Maldon in Essex in the parliaments of April 1384 and February 1388. He was also wardman of Maldon in 1385–1387, assessor of taxes in 1387–1390, and warden of leather in 1395–96.
