= East Essex (constituency) =

Parliamentary constituency in the United Kingdom, 1868–1885

- Former county constituency for the House of Commons
- County: Essex

1868–1885
- Seats: Two
- Created from: North Essex (6 hundreds of); South Essex (took Dengie hundred away from)
- Replaced by: Saffron Walden (east part of), Maldon, Harwich, Colchester, South East Essex

East Essex, formally known as the East Division of Essex was a parliamentary constituency in the English county of Essex. From 1868 to 1885, it returned two Members of Parliament (MPs) to the House of Commons of the Parliament of the United Kingdom, using the bloc vote system of election.

== History and boundaries ==
East Essex was created by the Reform Act 1867 for the 1868 general election as one of three two-member divisions of Essex (East, South and West), replacing the two divisions which had been created by the Reform Act 1832 (Northern and Southern). Initially named as the North East Division, it was renamed the East Division under the Boundaries Act 1868. The seat was created from parts of both South Essex and North Essex.

The place for "holding of courts for election of members" from 1867 became Braintree under the 1867 Act.

The boundaries were defined as:

- The Hundreds of Hinckford, Lexden, Tendring, Winstree, Witham, Thurstable, and Dengie.

See map on Vision of Britain website.

The Dengie hundred was transferred from the Southern Division, with the remainder being previously part of the abolished Northern division.

Under the Redistribution of Seats Act 1885, the three two-member divisions of Essex were abolished and replaced by eight single-member divisions. East Essex was replaced by the Harwich and Maldon Divisions and parts of the Saffron Walden and South Eastern Divisions.

== Members of Parliament ==
Election	1st Member	1st Party	2nd Member	2nd Party
1868	James Round	Conservative	Samuel Ruggles-Brise	Conservative
1883 by-election	James Round	Conservative	Charles Hedley Strutt	Conservative
1885	constituency abolished			

== Election results ==
General election 1868: East Essex
Party	Candidate	Votes	%	±%
Conservative	James Round	2,861	28.5	
Conservative	Samuel Ruggles-Brise	2,816	28.1	
Liberal	Thomas Western	2,224	22.2	
Liberal	Thomas Abdy	2,134	21.3	
Majority		592	5.9	
Turnout		5,018 (est)	76.4 (est)	
Registered electors		6,564		
Conservative win (new seat)				
Conservative win (new seat)				

General election 1874: East Essex
Party	Candidate	Votes	%	±%
Conservative	James Round	Unopposed		
Conservative	Samuel Ruggles-Brise	Unopposed		
Registered electors		6,453		
Conservative hold				
Conservative hold				

General election 1880: East Essex
Party	Candidate	Votes	%	±%
Conservative	James Round	2,691	35.3	N/A
Conservative	Samuel Ruggles-Brise	2,561	33.6	N/A
Liberal	Charles Page Wood	2,369	31.1	New
Majority		192	2.5	N/A
Turnout		5,060 (est)	79.3 (est)	N/A
Registered electors		6,380		
Conservative hold		Swing	N/A	
Conservative hold		Swing	N/A	

Brise's resignation caused a by-election.

By-election, 25 Aug 1883: East Essex
Party	Candidate	Votes	%	±%
Conservative	Charles Hedley Strutt	Unopposed		
Conservative hold				
