= Sir William Wiseman, 1st Baronet =

English landowner and politician

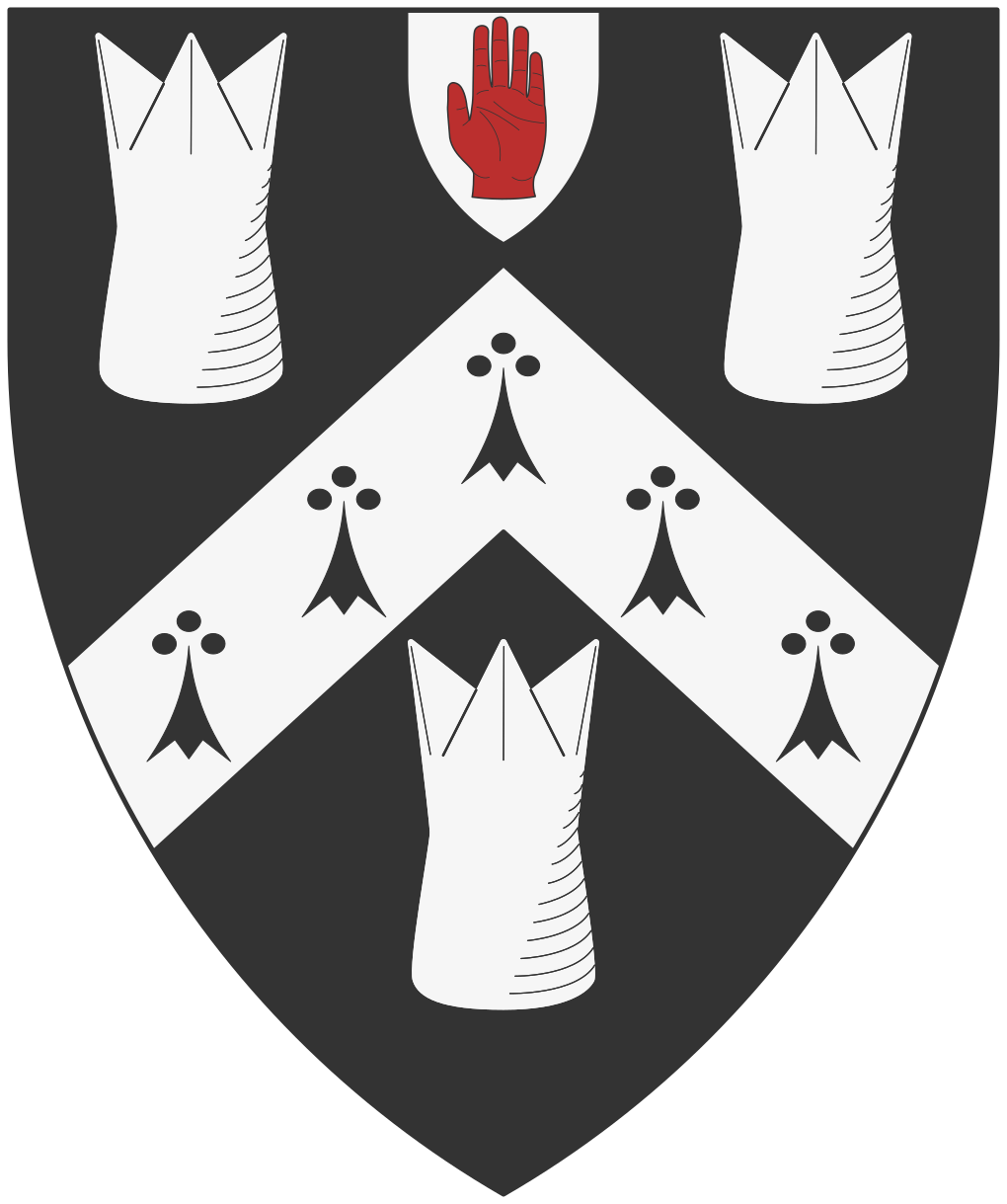
Arms of Wiseman of Thundersley, of Rivenhall

Sir William Wiseman, 1st Baronet (c 1629 - 1688) of Rivenhall Place, Rivenhall End, Essex was an English landowner and politician who sat in the House of Commons between 1677 and 1685.

Wiseman was the son of Sir Thomas Wiseman of Rivenhall, Essex, and his wife Elizabeth Sedley daughter of Sir Isaac Sedley, 1st Baronet of Great Chart, Kent. He succeeded to Rivenhall Place on the death of his father in 1659.

He was appointed High Sheriff of Essex for the remainder of 1659–60 in place of his father, who had died in office. He was created a baronet on 15 June 1660 and knighted on 24 June 1660.

In 1677, he was elected Member of Parliament for Maldon in a by-election to the Cavalier Parliament. He was re-elected MP for Maldon in the two elections of 1679 and again in 1681.

Wiseman died in London, at the age of about 58 and was buried in London on 14 June 1688, when the Baronetcy became extinct. He had married before 1664, Elizabeth Mansel, daughter of Sir Lewis Mansel, 2nd Baronet of Margam and his third wife Elizabeth Montagu, daughter of Henry Montagu, Earl of Manchester. Rivenhall Place was sold by his widow and brother to the Western family.

Parliament of England
Preceded by John Tyrell; Sir Richard Wiseman	Member of Parliament for Maldon; 1677–1685; With: Sir Richard Wiseman 1677–1679; Sir John Bramston 1679; Sir Thomas Darcy, 1st Baronet 1679–1685	Succeeded by Sir John Bramston; Sir Thomas Darcy, 1st Baronet
Baronetage of England
New creation	Baronet (of Rivenhall); 1660–1688	Extinct
