= Sir William Wiseman, 10th Baronet =

British intelligence agent and banker

Sir William George Eden Wiseman, 10th Baronet CB (1 February 1885 – 17 June 1962) was a British intelligence agent and banker. He was a general partner at American investment bank Kuhn, Loeb & Co. from 1929 till 1960.

== Life ==
The grandson of Sir William Wiseman, 8th Baronet, a British naval officer, he was educated at Winchester College and Jesus College, Cambridge. He was appointed a second lieutenant in the Cardigan Royal Garrison Artillery (Militia) on 30 April 1902.

As a businessman, before the outbreak of the First World War he was chairman in London of Hendens Trust. From 1914, he served as a lieutenant colonel with the Duke of Cornwall's Light Infantry but, following injury, transferred to military intelligence. He was sent by Secret Intelligence Service director, Mansfield Smith-Cumming, to establish the agency's office in New York, 'Section V'. As the head of the British intelligence mission in the United States, Wiseman was extensively involved in the counter-intelligence against the Indian seditionists and was ultimately responsible for leaking to New York Police, bypassing diplomatic channels, the details of a bomb plot that led to the uncovering of the Hindu Conspiracy.

Wiseman acted as a liaison between Woodrow Wilson and the British government. He and his associate General Julius Klein were closely associated with Special Advisor to Wilson Colonel Edward M. House. He met with Wilson on a regular basis and on one notable occasion in August 1918 spent a week's vacation with the President and House. Wiseman was also a mentor to spy chief William Stephenson. He was made a Companion of the Order of the Bath, In recognition of services in connection with the War, in the King's 1918 Birthday Honours.

After the war, Wiseman was a participant in the 1919 Paris Peace Conference. He remained in the U.S. as an employee of Kuhn Loeb, becoming a partner in 1929.

== See also ==
- Foreign policy of the Woodrow Wilson administration

Baronetage of England
Preceded by William Wiseman	Baronet (of Canfield Hall); 1893–1962	Succeeded by John William Wiseman
