= Richard Bush (MP) =

Member of the Parliament of England

Richard Bush (fl. 1380s) was a member of the Parliament of England for the constituency of Maldon in Essex between 1381 and 1386.

He was still alive in 1398. He had a relative, perhaps his son, Richard Bush junior.
