= Jack Dwyer =

American football player (1927–1997)

No. 29, 89
- Position: Defensive back

Personal information
- Born: January 15, 1927; Los Angeles, California, U.S.
- Died: October 15, 1997 (aged 70)
- Listed height: 5 ft 11 in (1.80 m)
- Listed weight: 175 lb (79 kg)

Career information
- High school: Alexander Hamilton (Los Angeles)
- College: Loyola Marymount (1949–1950)
- NFL draft: 1951: 5th round, 57th overall pick

Career history
- Washington Redskins (1951); Los Angeles Rams (1952–1955); Montreal Alouettes (1956)

Career NFL statistics
- Interceptions: 11
- Fumble recoveries: 5
- Total touchdowns: 4
- Stats at Pro Football Reference

John Joseph Dwyer (January 15, 1927 – October 15, 1997) was an American professional football defensive back in the National Football League for the Washington Redskins and the Los Angeles Rams. He played college football at Loyola Marymount University and was drafted in the fifth round of the 1951 NFL draft by the Philadelphia Eagles.
