= Maldon (constituency) =

UK Parliament constituency (1885–1983, 2010 onwards)

- County constituency for the House of Commons
- Interactive map of boundaries since 2024
- Location within the East of England
- County: Essex
- Electorate: 76,794 (March 2020)
- Major settlements: Maldon, Burnham-on-Crouch, South Woodham Ferrers

Current constituency
- Created: 2010
- Member of Parliament: John Whittingdale (Conservative)
- Seats: One
- Created from: Maldon and East Chelmsford, Rayleigh and West Chelmsford

1885–1983
- Seats: One
- Type of constituency: County constituency
- Created from: East Essex, Maldon (Parliamentary Borough)
- Replaced by: South Colchester and Maldon and Rochford

1332–1885
- Seats: 1332–1868: Two; 1868–1885: One
- Type of constituency: Borough constituency
- Replaced by: Maldon (county constituency)

Maldon is a constituency (Note: A county constituency (for the purposes of election expenses and type of returning officer).) in Essex represented in the House of Commons of the UK Parliament since its recreation in 2010 by Sir John Whittingdale, a Conservative. (Note: As with all constituencies, the constituency elects one Member of Parliament (MP) by the first past the post system of election at least every five years.) Whittingdale had previously been MP for the predecessor constituencies of South Colchester and Maldon (1992-1997) then Maldon and East Chelmsford (1997-2010)

== Constituency profile ==
Maldon is a mostly rural constituency in Essex. It covers the Dengie Peninsula and the rural areas south of Chelmsford. It is named after the town of Maldon, which has a population of around 24,000 when taken together with the connected village of Heybridge. Other settlements in the constituency include the towns of South Woodham Ferrers and Burnham-on-Crouch and the villages of Danbury, Southminster, Mayland, Runwell and Galleywood. Maldon has a maritime history and is known for its production of sea salt. South Woodham Ferrers is a new town developed in the 1970s and Burnham-on-Crouch is an important centre for yachting. The constituency is generally wealthy with low levels of deprivation, particularly so in South Woodham Ferrers. House prices are higher than the national and East of England averages.

Residents of the constituency are generally older and have high rates of homeownership compared to the rest of the country. Few are degree-educated, but household income is high and the child poverty rate is low. A high proportion of residents work in the retail and construction sectors and few are unemployed. White people made up 96% of the population at the 2021 census. At the local council level, the constituency's towns are mostly represented by Liberal Democrats whilst the villages and rural areas elected Conservatives, localists and independents. Voters strongly supported leaving the European Union in the 2016 referendum; an estimated 60% voted in favour of Brexit compared to the nationwide figure of 52%.

== History ==
The Parliamentary Borough of Maldon, which included the parish of Heybridge, had sent two members to the Parliament of England since it was founded in 1332 (36 years after the Model Parliament) until 1707, then to the Parliament of Great Britain from 1707 to 1800 and to the Parliament of the United Kingdom from 1801. Under the Reform Act 1867, its representation was reduced to one, and in 1885 the parliamentary borough was abolished and replaced with a division of the County of Essex (later a county constituency) under the Redistribution of Seats Act 1885.

The constituency was abolished for the 1983 general election following the Third Periodic Review of Westminster Constituencies, but re-established for the 2010 general election by the Fifth Review. The current seat is primarily a successor to the Maldon and East Chelmsford constituency which existed from 1997 to 2010.

== Boundaries and boundary changes ==
=== Historic ===
==== 1885–1918 ====
- The Municipal Borough of Maldon;
- The Sessional Divisions of Hinckford South (Braintree Bench) and Witham; and
- Parts of the Sessional Divisions of Hinckford South (Halstead Bench), Lexden, and Winstree.

Formally known as the Eastern or Maldon Division of Essex, incorporating the abolished Parliamentary Borough of Maldon and extending northwards to include the towns of Witham, Braintree and Halstead.

==== 1918–1950 ====
- The Municipal Borough of Maldon;
- The Urban Districts of Braintree, Burnham-on-Crouch, and Witham;
- The Rural District of Maldon; and
- The Rural District of Braintree (including the detached part of the parish of Inworth which was wholly surrounded by the parishes of Great Braxted and Kelvedon).

Area to the south between the rivers Crouch and Blackwater, including Burnham-on-Crouch, transferred from the South-Eastern Division of Essex. The northernmost area, including Halstead, and eastern fringes transferred to Saffron Walden and Colchester respectively. Other minor changes.

==== 1950–1959 ====
- The Municipal Borough of Maldon;
- The Urban Districts of Braintree and Bocking, Burnham-on-Crouch, and Witham;
- The Rural District of Maldon; and
- Part of the Rural District of Braintree.

Marginal changes as a result of changes to local authority boundaries.

==== 1959–1974 ====
As above but the part of the Rural District of Braintree was altered by the County of Essex (Braintree and Lexden and Winstree Rural Districts) Confirmation Order 1955.

Marginal changes as a result of changes to local authority boundaries.

==== 1974–1983 ====
- The Municipal Borough of Maldon;
- The Urban District of Burnham-on-Crouch; and
- The Rural Districts of Maldon and Rochford.

Major reconfiguration, as Braintree and Bocking, and Witham, together with the parts of the Rural District of Braintree, formed the basis for the new constituency of Braintree. The Rural District of Rochford was transferred from South East Essex.

Constituency abolished for the 1983 general election. Southern area, comprising the former Rural District of Rochford, included in the new constituency of Rochford. Remainder formed the majority of the new constituency of South Colchester and Maldon.

Map of boundaries 2010–2024

==== 2010–2024 ====
- The District of Maldon wards of Althorne, Burnham-on-Crouch North, Burnham-on-Crouch South, Great Totham, Heybridge East, Heybridge West, Maldon East, Maldon North, Maldon South, Maldon West, Mayland, Purleigh, Southminster, Tillingham, Tollesbury, and Tolleshunt D'Arcy; and
- The Borough of Chelmsford wards of Bicknacre and East and West Hanningfield; Little Baddow, Danbury and Sandon; Rettendon and Runwell; South Hanningfield, Stock and Margaretting; South Woodham Chetwood and Collingwood; and South Woodham Elmwood and Woodville;

Following the Boundary Commission's Fifth Periodic Review of Westminster constituencies, Parliament radically altered some constituencies and created new ones to allow for changes in population. The majority of the former Maldon and East Chelmsford constituency formed the basis of this new seat for 2010. The constituency retained Maldon and Burnham-on-Crouch, but lost the Chelmsford parts to the re-established Chelmsford seat and the new constituency of Witham. To compensate, wards in and around South Woodham Ferrers were added from the former Rayleigh constituency, and Margaretting was added from the former West Chelmsford constituency.

=== Current ===
Further to the 2023 review of Westminster constituencies, which came into effect for the 2024 general election, the composition of the constituency was expanded northwards slightly with the transfer in from Chelmsford of the City of Chelmsford ward of Galleywood.

== The historic constituency (1332–1983) ==
Maldon
- Former borough constituency for the House of Commons

1332–1885
- Seats: two (1295–1868) one (1868–1885)

Essex, Maldon
- Former county constituency for the House of Commons

1885–1983
- Seats: one

Maldon was originally a parliamentary borough in Essex, first represented in the House of Commons in 1332; it elected two MPs until 1868, and one from 1868 until 1885. In that year the borough was abolished but the name was transferred to a county division of Essex, which continued with some boundary changes until 1983.

=== Maldon borough (1332–1885) ===
==== Boundaries and franchise before the Reform Act 1832 ====
Until the Great Reform Act 1832, the borough consisted of the three parishes of the town of Maldon, a small market town and port on the coast of Essex.

Maldon had been a municipal as well as a parliamentary borough. Its first charter dated from the reign of Henry II, and at one time the corporation had the sole right to elect the town's MPs. From 1701 at the latest, however, the right to vote was exercised by the freemen of the town, whether or not resident within the borough; and, unusually, honorary freemen and those acquiring the freedom by purchase were also entitled to vote in Maldon. This had several consequences. The electorate in Maldon was much bigger than was usual in a town of that size — in the first half of the 18th century, the number of qualified voters was generally about 800 (the majority of whom did not live in Maldon). It also meant that the town corporation, with the power to create freemen and therefore voters, was in a position to gerrymander elections if it so wished. This might, as was the case in some other boroughs, have ended in one interest gaining control of the corporation and turning Maldon into a pocket borough; in fact, however, Maldon instead stayed independent but venal, and gaining election there tended to be an expensive business. Sometimes it was not merely a case of bribing the voters: in 1690, it was recorded in the House of Commons journals that the wives and daughters of Maldon freemen were being bribed at election time as well.

One interest that was firmly established by the middle of the 18th century, however, was that of the government, which ensured that lucrative posts in the customs house were reserved for loyally-voting freemen, and also attempted to have government supporters – often strangers to the town – elected to vacancies on the corporation. It was generally taken for granted that the government candidates would normally be elected.

==== The Strutt ascendancy ====
However, in the 1750s the government's control of Maldon weakened, and a prominent local Tory, John Strutt, found he had enough influence with the voters to sway elections. He secured the election of several of his friends over the years and eventually, in 1774, successfully stood for election himself.

In the meanwhile, however, there was a dramatic change in the system. In 1763 one of the sitting MPs, Strutt's friend Bamber Gascoyne, was appointed to the Board of Trade and therefore had to stand for re-election at Maldon. Gascoyne's opponent, John Huske, accused him of threatening that any freemen working in the customs house who did not vote for him would be dismissed (which, by that time, would have been an illegal threat). Although the Prime Minister, George Grenville, denied having authorised Gascoyne to make any such threat and Gascoyne denied having made it, it seems clear it was believed in Maldon and the corporation sided with Huske, creating enough new freemen to ensure Gascoyne was defeated. Both sides started actions for bribery, but Gascoyne had decided on more drastic action. He took out a writ against the corporation, and the Courts ordered the ousting of the majority of members; eventually, in 1768, the corporation was dissolved by judicial order.

For half a century the duties of returning officer were transferred to the High Sheriff of Essex. However, the Sheriff could not assume the corporation's function of swearing in new freemen, and Strutt's influence was thus entirely secured against any possibility of new voters being created to outvote him. However, there was a problem: by the time of the general election of 1807 the number of remaining qualified voters had dwindled to 58, and the constituency was in imminent danger of quite literally dying out. Yet there were more than 800 new freemen who were only barred from voting because there was nobody to swear them in. Finally a new charter was granted, in time to enfranchise them for the election of 1810.

Matters then returned to normal in Maldon for the remaining 22 years before the Reform Act 1832. Strutt's son, Joseph Holden Strutt, retained much of the influence that his father had wielded, being generally considered to be able to nominate one of the two MPs or to choose to sit himself; as he exercised all government patronage in Maldon, he was well-placed to secure the other seat as well. But when the voters proved uncooperative, they could easily enough be overruled: at the 1826 election, the Corporation secured the result it wanted by admitting another thousand new freemen in time for them to vote: 3,113 freemen voted, of whom only 251 were Maldon residents.

==== After the Reform Act 1832 ====
In the initial drafts of the Reform Bill, Maldon was to lose one of its two seats. It was eventually spared this fate, but its population of 3,831 in 1831 left it very close to the borderline. The eventual Reform Act 1832 extended the borough by adding the neighbouring parish of Heybridge, increasing the population to 4,895; but with only 716 qualified voters under the new franchise its electorate was less than a quarter of what it had previously been. The constituency was a highly marginal one, victory rarely being secured by more than a handful of votes. In 1852, only 40 votes separated first place from fourth, and the second Tory's majority over his Whig opponent was only 6; after the losing candidates petitioned, alleging corruption, the election was declared void and Maldon's right to representation was suspended while a royal commission investigated. However, no major scandal was uncovered and (unlike some other boroughs similarly investigated at the same period) its right to vote was reinstated and a writ for a new by-election which took place in 1854 was issued.

=== Maldon county constituency (1885–1983) ===
The Reform Act 1867, implemented in 1868, took seats from most of the smallest boroughs, and Maldon's representation was halved; but it was still too small, and at the election of 1885 the borough was abolished altogether. The county division into which the town was placed, however, was named after the town. (Officially, until 1918, it was the Eastern (or Maldon) Division of Essex; after that, simply the Maldon division.) As well as Maldon itself this contained the towns of Braintree, Halstead and Witham. Once again this constituency was a marginal one — almost the only rural county seat in the South East at this period not to be safely Conservative. The strength of the Liberal vote seems to have been based partly on the strength of Nonconformism in the Halstead area, but also on trade unionism among the agricultural labourers (which elsewhere in Essex was offset by a strongly Tory maritime vote which Maldon lacked).

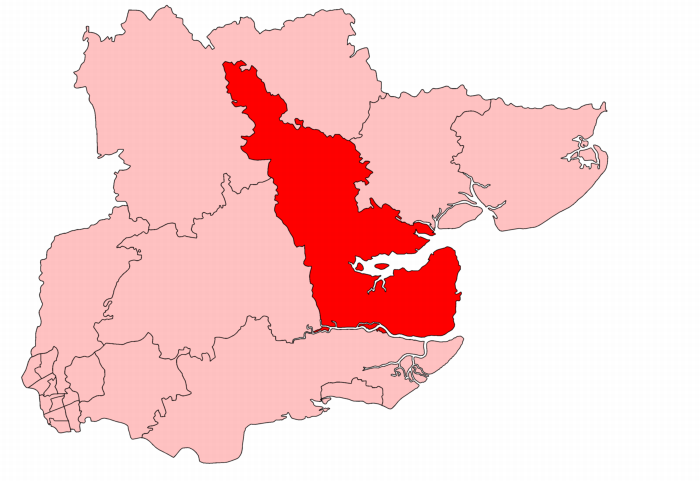
Maldon in Essex, 1918–1945

After 1918, boundary changes added Burnham on Crouch and the surrounding district, but the constituency was still a rural one, with 35% of the occupied male population employed in the agricultural sector at the time of the 1921 census. The Labour Party rather than the Liberals were now the Conservatives' main opponents. When the Liberal Party split in 1922, Maldon's Liberals split as well, and the constituency was the first where the Lloyd George Liberals set up a constituency association, though this was apparently without the sanction of the national party headquarters and the association is not recorded as having organised any activities. In 1923 no Liberal candidate stood at all, and Labour captured the seat for the first time. The Conservatives retook the seat in 1924, holding it until the 1940s, but it was won by Tom Driberg in a wartime by-election. Labour held the seat until 1955 when the Conservatives gained it and held on with marginal majorities until the 1970s, when the seat gradually became safe with bigger majorities until its abolition.

The Maldon constituency was abolished in the boundary changes which came into effect at the 1983 election, being divided between the new Colchester South and Maldon and Rochford constituencies.

== Members of Parliament ==
=== MPs 1332–1640 ===
Parliament	First member	Second member
1386	Richard Bush	John Glover
1388 (Feb)	John Dyer	Henry Hales
1388 (Sep)	John Crakebon	John Welles
1390 (Jan)	John Skinner I	John Joce
1390 (Nov)		
1391	John Welles	John Page
1393	John Skinner	John Glover
1394		
1395		
1397 (Jan)	John Glover	John Joce
1397 (Sep)		
1399	John Joce	John Crakebon
1401		
1402	John Page	Thomas Paffe
1404 (Jan)	John Burgess	Thomas Paffe
1404 (Oct)		
1406	John Flower	Robert Painter
1407	John Page	John Hockham
1410	?William Wade	
1411	John Flower	John Burgess
1413 (Feb)		
1413 (May)	Richard Galon	John Burgess
1414 (Apr)		
1414 (Nov)	John Flower	John Burgess
1415		
1416 (Mar)		
1416 (Oct)		
1417	Thomas Paffe	Richard Sampson
1419	Richard Galon	William Bennett
1420	John Burgess	Richard Galon
1421 (May)	John Cooper	Richard Bawde
1421 (Dec)	William Burgh	William Gore
1422	Robert Darcy	
1487	Sir Richard Fitzlewis	
1491	Robert Plummer	
1504	Sir William Say	
1510	Sir Richard FitzLewis	Thomas Hintlesham
1512	Thomas Cressener	?
1515	John Strangman	?
1523	John Bozom	Thomas Wyburgh
1529	Thomas Tey	Edward Peyton
1536	William Harris	John Raymond
1539	John Edmonds	William Bonham
1542	Edward Bury	Henry Dowes
1545	Clement Smith	Nicholas Throckmorton
1547	Sir Clement Smith	Henry Dowes, died and replaced by Jan 1552 by William Bassett
1553 (Mar)	Sir Walter Mildmay	Henry Fortescue
1553 (Oct)	?Anthony Browne	John Raymond
1554 (Apr)	Thomas Hungate	Edmund Tyrrell
1554 (Nov)	Anthony Browne	John Wiseman
1555	Sir Henry Radclyffe	Richard Weston
1558	Edmund Tyrrell	Roger Appleton, died and replaced by Nov 1558 by Henry Golding
1559	Sir Humphrey Radcliffe	Henry Golding
1562–3	John Lathom	Richard Argall
1571	Peter Osborne. sat for Guildford, repl. by George Blythe	Gabriel Croft
1572	Thomas Gent	Vincent Harris, died and repl. Oct 1574 by Edward Sulyard
1584	Edward Lewknor	William Wiseman
1586	John Butler	Edward Lewknor
1588	John Butler	William Vernon, sick and replaced by Edward Lewknor
1593	Sir Thomas Mildmay, Bt	Edward Lewknor
1597	Thomas Harris	William Wiseman
1601	William Wiseman	Richard Weston
1604	Sir Edward Lewknor, died and replaced 1605 by Sir Theophilus Howard	William Wiseman, died and replaced 1610 by Sir John Sammes
1610	Sir Robert Rich	William Wiseman, died and replaced 1610 by Sir John Sammes
1614	Sir John Sammes	Charles Chiborne
1621-1622	Sir Henry Mildmay	Sir Julius Caesar
1624	Sir William Masham, Bt	Sir Arthur Harris
1625	Sir William Masham, Bt	Sir Henry Mildmay
1626	Sir William Masham, Bt	Sir Thomas Cheek
1628-1629	Sir Henry Mildmay	Sir Arthur Harris
1629–1640	No Parliaments summoned	

=== MPs 1640–1868 ===
Year	First member	First party	Second member	Second party
April 1640	Sir Henry Mildmay	Parliamentarian	John Porter	
November 1640	Sir Henry Mildmay	Parliamentarian	Sir John Clotworthy	Parliamentarian
January 1648	Sir Henry Mildmay	Parliamentarian	Clotworthy disabled from sitting January 1648, but readmitted June 1648	
June 1648	Sir Henry Mildmay	Parliamentarian	Sir John Clotworthy	Parliamentarian
December 1648	Sir Henry Mildmay	Parliamentarian	Clotworthy excluded in Pride's Purge - seat vacant	
1653	Maldon was unrepresented in the Barebones Parliament			
1654	Colonel Joachim Matthews		Maldon had only one seat in the First and Second Parliaments of the Protectorate	
1656	Colonel Joachim Matthews		Maldon had only one seat in the First and Second Parliaments of the Protectorate	
January 1659	Colonel Joachim Matthews		Henry Mildmay	
May 1659	Colonel Sir Henry Mildmay		One seat vacant	
April 1660	Tristram Conyers		Henry Mildmay	
June 1660	Tristram Conyers		Edward Herrys	
1661	Sir John Tyrell		Sir Richard Wiseman	
1677	Sir William Wiseman, 1st Baronet		Sir Richard Wiseman	
March 1679	Sir William Wiseman, 1st Baronet		Sir John Bramston	
October 1679	Sir William Wiseman, 1st Baronet		Sir Thomas Darcy, 1st Baronet	
1685	Sir John Bramston		Sir Thomas Darcy, 1st Baronet	
1689	Charles Montagu		Sir Thomas Darcy, 1st Baronet	
1693	Charles Montagu		Sir Eliab Harvey	
1695	Irby Montagu		Sir Eliab Harvey	
1699	Irby Montagu		John Bullock	
January 1701	Irby Montagu		William Fytche	
November 1701	John Comyns		William Fytche	
1708	Sir Richard Child		Thomas Richmond	Whig
1710	John Comyns (Note: Comyns was re-elected in 1715, but his election was declared void because he refused to take the oath that he met the property qualification to be elected. Tufnell, was seated in his place.)		Thomas Richmond	Whig
1711	John Comyns		William Fytche	
1712	John Comyns		Thomas Bramston I	
1715	Samuel Tufnell		Thomas Bramston I	
1722	Sir John Comyns		Thomas Bramston I	
1727	Henry Parsons		Thomas Bramston II	
1734	Henry Parsons		Martin Bladen	
1740	Benjamin Keene		Martin Bladen	
1741	Sir Thomas Drury, Bt		Robert Colebrooke	
1747	Sir Richard Lloyd, KC		Robert Colebrooke	
1754	Colonel John Bullock		Robert Colebrooke	
1761	Colonel John Bullock		Bamber Gascoyne	Independent
1768	Colonel John Bullock		John Huske	
1773	Colonel John Bullock		Charles Rainsford	
1774	John Strutt	Tory	Hon. Richard Savage Nassau	
1780	John Strutt	Tory	Eliab Harvey	
1784	John Strutt	Tory	The Lord Waltham	
1787	John Strutt	Tory	Sir Peter Parker, Bt	
1790	Joseph Strutt	Tory	Charles Western	Whig
1806	Joseph Strutt	Tory	Benjamin Gaskell (Note: On petition, Gaskell was adjudged not to have been duly elected, and his opponent, Western, was seated in his place.)	Whig
1807	Joseph Strutt	Tory	Charles Western	Whig
1812	Joseph Strutt	Tory	Benjamin Gaskell	Whig
1826	Hon. George Allanson-Winn	Tory	Thomas Barrett-Lennard	Whig
1827	Hugh Dick	Tory	Thomas Barrett-Lennard	Whig
1830	Quintin Dick	Tory	Thomas Barrett-Lennard	Whig
1834	Quintin Dick	Conservative	Thomas Barrett-Lennard	Whig
1837	Quintin Dick	Conservative	John Round	Conservative
1847	David Waddington	Conservative	Thomas Barrett-Lennard	Whig
1852	Charles du Cane	Conservative	Taverner John Miller	Conservative
1853	Writ suspended			
1854	George Peacocke	Conservative	John Bramley-Moore	Conservative
1857	Thomas Western	Whig	John Bramley-Moore	Conservative
1859	Thomas Western	Liberal	George Peacocke (Note: Peacocke changed his name to Sandford during the Parliament of 1865.)	Conservative
1865	Ralph Earle	Conservative	George Peacocke	Conservative
1868	Representation reduced to one member			

=== MPs 1868–1983 ===
Election	Member	Party	Notes
1868	Edward Hammond Bentall	Liberal	
1874	George Sandford	Conservative	
1878	George Courtauld	Liberal	
1885	Arthur Kitching	Liberal	
1886	Charles Wing Gray	Conservative	
1892	Cyril Dodd	Liberal	
1895	Hon. Charles Strutt	Conservative	
1906	Thomas Bethell	Liberal	
1910	James Fortescue Flannery	Conservative	
1922	Edward Ruggles-Brise	Conservative	
1923	Valentine Crittall	Labour	
1924	Edward Ruggles-Brise	Conservative	
1942	Tom Driberg	Independent Labour	
1945	Tom Driberg	Labour	
1955	Brian Harrison	Conservative	
Constituency split, majority formed new seat of Braintree, minority merged with part of South East Essex
1974	John Wakeham	Conservative	Contested South Colchester and Maldon following redistribution
1983	Constituency abolished: South Colchester and Maldon		

=== MPs since 2010 ===
The re-formed Maldon seat was fought for the first time at the 2010 general election.

Election	Member	Party	Notes
2010	John Whittingdale	Conservative	Secretary of State for Culture, Media and Sport (2015–16); Member for Maldon and East Chelmsford (1997–2010)

== Elections ==
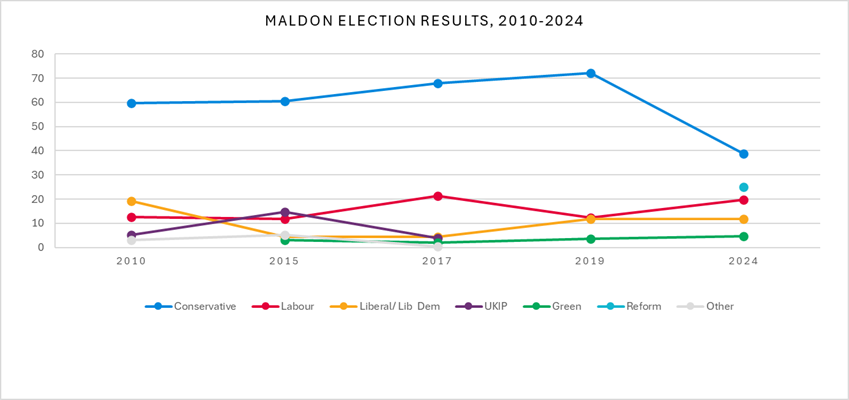
Maldon election results 2010–2024

=== Elections in the 2020s ===
General election 2024: Maldon
Party	Candidate	Votes	%	±%
Conservative	John Whittingdale	19,374	38.9	−33.3
Reform	Pamela Walford	12,468	25.0	New
Labour	Onike Gollo	9,817	19.7	+7.1
Liberal Democrats	Simon Burwood	5,882	11.8	+0.1
Green	Isobel Doubleday	2,300	4.6	+1.2
Majority		6,906	13.9	−45.7
Turnout		49,841	63.7	−6.2
Registered electors		78,281		
Conservative hold		Swing		

=== Elections in the 2010s ===
2019 notional result
Party	Vote	%
Conservative	38,791	72.2
Labour	6,790	12.6
Liberal Democrats	6,272	11.7
Green	1,851	3.4
Turnout	53,704	69.9
Electorate	76,794	

General election 2019: Maldon
Party	Candidate	Votes	%	±%
Conservative	John Whittingdale	36,304	72.0	+4.1
Labour	Stephen Capper	6,263	12.4	−8.9
Liberal Democrats	Colin Baldy	5,990	11.9	+7.6
Green	Janet Band	1,851	3.7	+1.6
Majority		30,041	59.6	+13.0
Turnout		50,408	69.4	−0.8
Conservative hold		Swing	+6.5	

General election 2017: Maldon
Party	Candidate	Votes	%	±%
Conservative	John Whittingdale	34,111	67.9	+7.3
Labour	Peter Edwards	10,681	21.3	+9.5
Liberal Democrats	Zoe O'Connell	2,181	4.3	−0.2
UKIP	Jesse Pryke	1,899	3.8	−10.9
Green	Steve Betteridge	1,073	2.1	−1.0
BNP	Richard Perry	257	0.5	New
Majority		23,430	46.6	+0.7
Turnout		50,202	70.2	+0.6
Conservative hold		Swing	−1.0	

General election 2015: Maldon
Party	Candidate	Votes	%	±%
Conservative	John Whittingdale	29,112	60.6	+0.8
UKIP	Beverley Acevedo	7,042	14.7	+9.6
Labour	Peter Edwards	5,690	11.8	−0.9
Independent	Ken Martin	2,424	5.0	New
Liberal Democrats	Zoe O'Connell	2,157	4.5	−14.8
Green	Bob Graves	1,504	3.1	New
Sustainable Population	John Marett	116	0.2	New
Majority		22,070	45.9	+5.4
Turnout		48,045	69.6	0.0
Conservative hold		Swing		

General election 2010: Maldon
Party	Candidate	Votes	%	±%
Conservative	John Whittingdale	28,661	59.8	
Liberal Democrats	Elfreda Tealby-Watson	9,254	19.3	
Labour	Swatantra Nandanwar	6,070	12.7	
UKIP	Jesse Pryke	2,446	5.1	
BNP	Len Blaine	1,464	3.1	
Majority		19,407	40.5	
Turnout		47,895	69.6	
Conservative win (new seat)				

=== Elections in the 1970s ===
General election 1979: Maldon
Party	Candidate	Votes	%	±%
Conservative	John Wakeham	29,585	57.8	+14.3
Labour	Robert Oliver	12,848	25.1	−4.9
Liberal	Michael Wright	8,730	17.1	−9.4
Majority		16,737	32.7	+19.2
Turnout		51,163	77.9	+1.7
Conservative hold		Swing		

General election October 1974: Maldon
Party	Candidate	Votes	%	±%
Conservative	John Wakeham	20,485	43.5	−0.4
Labour	Anthony Shaw	14,098	30.0	+3.4
Liberal	Roderick Beale	12,473	26.5	−3.0
Majority		6,387	13.5	−0.9
Turnout		47,056	76.2	−6.0
Conservative hold		Swing		

General election February 1974: Maldon
Party	Candidate	Votes	%	±%
Conservative	John Wakeham	22,088	43.9	
Liberal	John Beale	14,866	29.5	
Labour	Vera Morris	13,368	26.6	
Majority		7,222	14.4	
Turnout		50,322	82.2	
Conservative hold		Swing		

General election 1970: Maldon
Party	Candidate	Votes	%	±%
Conservative	Brian Harrison	29,229	50.6	+5.1
Labour	Stephen Haseler	22,957	39.8	−4.6
Liberal	John Beale	5,574	9.7	−0.4
Majority		6,272	10.9	+9.8
Turnout		57,760	79.8	−3.5
Conservative hold		Swing		

=== Elections in the 1960s ===
General election 1966: Maldon
Party	Candidate	Votes	%	±%
Conservative	Brian Harrison	22,572	45.5	+0.1
Labour	Bruce Douglas-Mann	22,066	44.4	+2.3
Liberal	William H. Jacks	5,015	10.10	−2.37
Majority		506	1.1	−2.1
Turnout		49,653	83.29	
Conservative hold		Swing		

General election 1964: Maldon
Party	Candidate	Votes	%	±%
Conservative	Brian Harrison	21,547	45.37	
Labour	S. Gordon Richards	20,016	42.15	
Liberal	William H. Jacks	5,924	12.47	
Majority		1,531	3.22	
Turnout		47,487	83.28	
Conservative hold		Swing		

=== Elections in the 1950s ===
General election 1959: Maldon
Party	Candidate	Votes	%	±%
Conservative	Brian Harrison	21,772	48.21	
Labour	S. Gordon Richards	19,532	43.25	
Liberal	Leonard Charles Montague Walsh	3,860	8.55	New
Majority		2,240	4.96	
Turnout		45,164	83.02	
Conservative hold		Swing		

General election 1955: Maldon
Party	Candidate	Votes	%	±%
Conservative	Brian Harrison	22,002	50.63	
Labour	Lynton Scutts	21,452	49.37	
Majority		550	1.26	N/A
Turnout		43,454	83.52	
Conservative gain from Labour		Swing		

General election 1951: Maldon
Party	Candidate	Votes	%	±%
Labour	Tom Driberg	22,756	50.79	
Conservative	Aubrey R. Moody	22,052	49.21	
Majority		704	1.58	
Turnout		44,808	87.38	
Labour hold		Swing		

General election 1950: Maldon
Party	Candidate	Votes	%	±%
Labour	Tom Driberg	20,567	47.53	
Conservative	Aubrey R. Moody	18,843	43.55	
Liberal	William Drummond Abernethy	3,859	8.92	New
Majority		1,724	3.98	
Turnout		43,269	86.16	
Labour hold		Swing		

=== Elections in the 1940s ===
Driberg was elected in 1942 as an Independent Labour candidate, but took the Labour Party whip in January 1945, and stood in the 1945 election as a Labour Party candidate.

General election, 1945: Maldon
Party	Candidate	Votes	%	±%
Labour	Tom Driberg	22,480	60.4	N/A
Conservative	Melford Stevenson	14,753	39.6	−13.8
Majority		7,727	20.8	N/A
Turnout		37,233	74.5	+0.7
Labour gain from Independent Labour		Swing		

1942 Maldon by-election
Party	Candidate	Votes	%	±%
Independent Labour	Tom Driberg	12,219	61.3	New
Conservative	Reuben Hunt	6,226	31.3	−22.1
National Independent and Agricultural	Richard Matthews	1,476	7.4	New
Majority		5,993	30.0	N/A
Turnout		19,921	44.4	−29.4
Independent Labour gain from Conservative		Swing		

=== Elections in the 1930s ===
General election, 1935: Maldon
Party	Candidate	Votes	%	±%
Conservative	Edward Ruggles-Brise	17,072	53.4	−17.4
Labour	William Frederick Toynbee	9,264	28.9	−0.3
Liberal	Hilda Buckmaster	5,680	17.7	New
Majority		7,808	24.5	−16.1
Turnout		32,016	73.8	−0.9
Conservative hold		Swing		

General election, 1931: Maldon
Party	Candidate	Votes	%	±%
Conservative	Edward Ruggles-Brise	22,055	70.8	+27.0
Labour	William Frederick Toynbee	9,078	29.2	−5.9
Majority		12,977	41.6	+32.9
Turnout		31,133	74.7	−4.8
Conservative hold		Swing		

=== Elections in the 1920s ===
General election, 1929: Maldon
Party	Candidate	Votes	%	±%
Unionist	Edward Ruggles-Brise	14,020	43.8	−8.5
Labour	Herbert Evans	11,224	35.1	−1.8
Liberal	Herbert Alfred May	6,748	21.1	+10.3
Majority		2,796	8.7	−6.7
Turnout		31,992	79.5	−3.1
Unionist hold		Swing	−3.3	

General election, 1924: Maldon
Party	Candidate	Votes	%	±%
Unionist	Edward Ruggles-Brise	13,209	52.3	+2.3
Labour	Valentine Crittall	9,323	36.9	−13.2
Liberal	Herbert Reginald Graham Brooks	2,724	10.8	New
Majority		3,886	15.4	N/A
Turnout		25,256	82.6	+13.0
Unionist gain from Labour		Swing		

General election, 1923: Maldon
Party	Candidate	Votes	%	±%
Labour	Valentine Crittall	10,329	50.1	+22.3
Unionist	Edward Ruggles-Brise	10,280	49.9	+2.7
Majority		49	0.2	N/A
Turnout		21,892	69.6	−5.2
Labour gain from Unionist		Swing	+9.7	

General election, 1922: Maldon
Party	Candidate	Votes	%	±%
Unionist	Edward Ruggles-Brise	10,337	47.2	−3.9
Labour	George Dallas	6,085	27.8	−11.8
Liberal	James Parish	5,470	25.0	+15.7
Majority		4,252	19.4	+7.9
Turnout		21,892	74.8	+18.1
Unionist hold		Swing		

=== Elections in the 1910s ===
General election 1918: Maldon
Party		Candidate	Votes	%	±%
C	Unionist	James Fortescue Flannery	8,138	51.1	
	Labour	George Dallas	6,315	39.6	New
	Liberal	Ernest William Tanner	1,490	9.3	
Majority			1,823	11.5	
Turnout			15,943	56.7	
	Unionist hold		Swing		
C indicates candidate endorsed by the coalition government.

== Election results 1832–1918 ==
=== Elections in the 1830s ===
General election 1832: Maldon
Party	Candidate	Votes	%
Whig	Thomas Barrett-Lennard	448	39.3
Tory	Quintin Dick	416	36.5
Whig	Peter Luard Wright	277	24.3
Turnout		671	93.7
Registered electors		716	
Majority		32	2.8
Whig hold			
Majority		139	12.2
Tory hold			

General election 1835: Maldon
Party	Candidate	Votes	%	±%
Conservative	Quintin Dick	441	36.6	+18.4
Whig	Thomas Barrett-Lennard	407	33.8	−29.8
Conservative	Henry St John-Mildmay	356	29.6	+11.4
Turnout		721	91.4	−2.3
Registered electors		789		
Majority		34	2.8	−9.4
Conservative hold		Swing	+16.7	
Majority		51	4.2	+1.4
Whig hold		Swing	−29.8	

General election 1837: Maldon
Party	Candidate	Votes	%	±%
Conservative	Quintin Dick	420	34.4	−2.2
Conservative	John Round	407	33.3	+3.7
Whig	Thomas Barrett-Lennard	395	32.3	−1.5
Majority		25	2.1	−0.7
Turnout		760	86.8	−4.6
Registered electors		876		
Conservative hold		Swing	−0.7	
Conservative gain from Whig		Swing	+2.2	

=== Elections in the 1840s ===
General election 1841: Maldon
Party	Candidate	Votes	%	±%
Conservative	Quintin Dick	472	35.5	+1.1
Conservative	John Round	446	33.5	+0.2
Whig	Thomas Abdy	413	31.0	−1.3
Majority		33	2.5	+0.4
Turnout		815	95.3	+8.5
Registered electors		855		
Conservative hold		Swing	+0.9	
Conservative hold		Swing	+0.4	

General election 1847: Maldon
Party	Candidate	Votes	%	±%
Conservative	David Waddington	461	34.6	+1.1
Whig	Thomas Barrett-Lennard	443	33.3	+2.3
Conservative	Quintin Dick	427	32.1	−3.4
Turnout		887 (est)	93.3 (est)	−2.0
Registered electors		951		
Majority		18	1.3	−1.2
Conservative hold		Swing	—	
Majority		16	1.2	N/A
Whig gain from Conservative		Swing	+2.3	

=== Elections in the 1850s ===
General election 1852: Maldon
Party	Candidate	Votes	%	±%
Conservative	Charles Du Cane	370	26.3	N/A
Conservative	Taverner John Miller	357	25.4	N/A
Whig	Thomas Barrett-Lennard	351	24.9	−8.4
Ind. Conservative	Quintin Dick	330	23.4	−8.7
Majority		6	0.5	−0.8
Turnout		704 (est)	83.3 (est)	−10.0
Registered electors		845		
Conservative hold		Swing		
Conservative gain from Whig		Swing		

The 1852 election was declared void on petition due to bribery and treating, and the writ was suspended in March 1853. A by-election was held in August 1854 to fill the vacancy.

By-election, 17 August 1854: Maldon
Party	Candidate	Votes	%	±%
Conservative	George Peacocke	406	29.2	+2.9
Conservative	John Bramley-Moore	399	28.7	+3.3
Whig	Thomas Barrett-Lennard	335	24.1	−0.8
Radical	Thomas MacEnteer	217	15.6	N/A
Peelite	Quintin Dick	34	2.4	−21.0
Majority		64	4.6	+4.1
Turnout		696 (est)	71.8 (est)	−11.5
Registered electors		968		
Conservative hold		Swing	+1.7	
Conservative hold		Swing	+1.9	

General election 1857: Maldon
Party	Candidate	Votes	%	±%
Whig	Thomas Western	427	35.8	+10.9
Conservative	John Bramley-Moore	405	34.0	+7.7
Conservative	George Peacocke	360	30.2	+4.8
Majority		22	1.8	N/A
Turnout		810 (est)	92.1 (est)	+8.8
Registered electors		879		
Whig gain from Conservative		Swing	−0.8	
Conservative hold		Swing	+0.8	

General election 1859: Maldon
Party	Candidate	Votes	%	±%
Conservative	George Peacocke	503	37.0	+6.8
Liberal	Thomas Western	431	31.7	−4.1
Conservative	Augustus William Henry Meyrick	427	31.4	−2.6
Turnout		896 (est)	83.7 (est)	−8.4
Registered electors		1,071		
Majority		72	5.3	
Conservative hold		Swing	+4.4	
Majority		4	0.3	−1.5
Liberal hold		Swing	−4.2	

=== Elections in the 1860s ===
General election 1865: Maldon
Party	Candidate	Votes	%	±%
Conservative	George Peacocke	461	36.2	−0.8
Conservative	Ralph Earle	420	32.9	+1.5
Liberal	Thomas Western	394	30.9	−0.8
Majority		26	2.0	−3.3
Turnout		835 (est)	97.1 (est)	+13.4
Registered electors		859		
Conservative hold		Swing	−0.2	
Conservative gain from Liberal		Swing	+1.0	

Seat reduced to one member

General election 1868: Maldon
Party	Candidate	Votes	%	±%
Liberal	Edward Hammond Bentall	657	56.6	+25.7
Conservative	George Sandford	504	43.4	−25.7
Majority		153	13.2	N/A
Turnout		1,161	83.1	−14.0
Registered electors		1,397		
Liberal gain from Conservative		Swing	+25.7	

=== Elections in the 1870s ===
General election 1874: Maldon
Party	Candidate	Votes	%	±%
Conservative	George Sandford	632	54.9	+11.5
Liberal	John Bennett	519	45.1	−11.5
Majority		113	9.8	N/A
Turnout		1,151	75.6	−7.5
Registered electors		1,522		
Conservative gain from Liberal		Swing	+11.5	

Sandford's resignation caused a by-election.

1878 Maldon by-election
Party	Candidate	Votes	%	±%
Liberal	George Courtauld	671	55.9	+10.8
Conservative	William Abdy	530	44.1	−10.8
Majority		141	11.8	N/A
Turnout		1,201	78.3	+2.7
Registered electors		1,534		
Liberal gain from Conservative		Swing	+10.8	

=== Elections in the 1880s ===
General election 1880: Maldon
Party	Candidate	Votes	%	±%
Liberal	George Courtauld	679	51.1	+6.0
Conservative	William Abdy	651	48.9	−6.0
Majority		28	2.2	N/A
Turnout		1,330	85.0	+9.4
Registered electors		1,564		
Liberal gain from Conservative		Swing	+6.0	

General election 1885: Maldon
Party	Candidate	Votes	%	±%
Liberal	Arthur Kitching	4,509	53.8	+2.7
Conservative	Charles Wing Gray	3,878	46.2	−2.7
Majority		631	7.6	+5.4
Turnout		8,387	85.0	0.0
Registered electors		9,869		
Liberal hold		Swing	+2.7	

General election 1886: Maldon
Party	Candidate	Votes	%	±%
Conservative	Charles Wing Gray	4,143	52.9	+6.7
Liberal	Edward Barnard	3,686	47.1	−6.7
Majority		457	5.8	N/A
Turnout		7,829	79.3	−5.7
Registered electors		9,869		
Conservative gain from Liberal		Swing	+6.7	

=== Elections in the 1890s ===
General election 1892: Maldon
Party	Candidate	Votes	%	±%
Liberal	Cyril Joseph Settle Dodd	4,321	51.0	+3.9
Conservative	Charles Wing Gray	4,153	49.0	−3.9
Majority		168	2.0	N/A
Turnout		8,474	83.4	+4.1
Registered electors		10,160		
Liberal gain from Conservative		Swing	+3.9	

General election 1895: Maldon
Party	Candidate	Votes	%	±%
Conservative	Charles Strutt	4,618	53.5	+4.5
Liberal	Cyril Joseph Settle Dodd	4,006	46.5	−4.5
Majority		612	7.0	N/A
Turnout		8,624	85.9	+2.5
Registered electors		10,041		
Conservative gain from Liberal		Swing	+4.5	

=== Elections in the 1900s ===
General election 1900: Maldon
Party	Candidate	Votes	%	±%
Conservative	Charles Strutt	4,649	58.5	+5.0
Liberal	John Henderson	3,301	41.5	−5.0
Majority		1,348	17.0	+10.0
Turnout		7,950	79.4	−6.5
Registered electors		10,018		
Conservative hold		Swing	+5.0	

Bethell

General election 1906: Maldon
Party	Candidate	Votes	%	±%
Liberal	Thomas Bethell	4,773	50.8	+9.3
Conservative	Charles Strutt	4,624	49.2	−9.3
Majority		149	1.6	N/A
Turnout		9,397	88.5	+9.1
Registered electors		10,613		
Liberal gain from Conservative		Swing	+9.3	

=== Elections in the 1910s ===
Flannery

General election January 1910: Maldon
Party	Candidate	Votes	%	±%
Conservative	James Fortescue Flannery	5,691	54.1	+4.9
Liberal	Thomas Bethell	4,822	45.9	−4.9
Majority		869	8.2	N/A
Turnout		10,513	91.3	+2.8
Conservative gain from Liberal		Swing	+4.9	

Jardine

General election December 1910: Maldon
Party	Candidate	Votes	%	±%
Conservative	James Fortescue Flannery	5,386	53.4	−0.7
Liberal	James Jardine	4,693	46.6	+0.7
Majority		693	6.8	−1.4
Turnout		10,069	87.5	−3.8
Conservative hold		Swing	-0.7	

General Election 1914–15:

Another General Election was required to take place before the end of 1915. The political parties had been making preparations for an election to take place and by July 1914, the following candidates had been selected;

- Unionist: James Fortescue Flannery
- Liberal: E. Tweedy Smith

== Pre–1832 election results ==
=== Elections in the 1830s ===
General election 1830: Maldon
Party	Candidate	Votes	%
Tory	Quintin Dick	Unopposed	
Whig	Thomas Barrett-Lennard	Unopposed	
Registered electors		c. 3,400	
Tory hold			
Whig hold			

General election 1831: Maldon
Party	Candidate	Votes	%
Tory	Quintin Dick	Unopposed	
Whig	Thomas Barrett-Lennard	Unopposed	
Registered electors		c. 3,400	
Tory hold			
Whig hold			

== See also ==
- 1942 Maldon by-election
- List of parliamentary constituencies in Essex
- List of parliamentary constituencies in the East of England (region)

== Sources ==
- Robert Beatson, A Chronological Register of Both Houses of Parliament (London: Longman, Hurst, Res & Orme, 1807)
- D. Brunton & D. H. Pennington, Members of the Long Parliament (London: George Allen & Unwin, 1954)
- John Cannon, Parliamentary Reform 1640-1832 (Cambridge: Cambridge University Press, 1972)
- Cobbett's Parliamentary history of England, from the Norman Conquest in 1066 to the year 1803 (London: Thomas Hansard, 1808)
- The Constitutional Year Book for 1913 (London: National Union of Conservative and Unionist Associations, 1913)
- F. W. S. Craig, British Parliamentary Election Results 1832-1885 (2nd edition, Aldershot: Parliamentary Research Services, 1989)
- Craig, F. W. S. (1983) [1969]. British parliamentary election results 1918-1949 (3rd ed.). Chichester: Parliamentary Research Services. ISBN 0-900178-06-X.
- Michael Kinnear, The British Voter (London: BH Batsford, Ltd, 1968)
- J. Holladay Philbin, Parliamentary Representation 1832 - England and Wales (New Haven: Yale University Press, 1965)
- Edward Porritt and Annie G Porritt, The Unreformed House of Commons (Cambridge University Press, 1903)
- T. H. B. Oldfield, The Representative History of Great Britain and Ireland (London: Baldwin, Cradock & Joy, 1816)
- Henry Pelling, Social Geography of British Elections 1885-1910 (London: Macmillan, 1967)
- Robert Waller, The Almanac of British Politics (1st edition, London: Croom Helm, 1983)
- Frederic A. Youngs jr, Guide to the Local Administrative Units of England, Vol I (London: Royal Historical Society, 1979)
