= Spains Hall =

Grade I listed Elizabethan country house in Essex

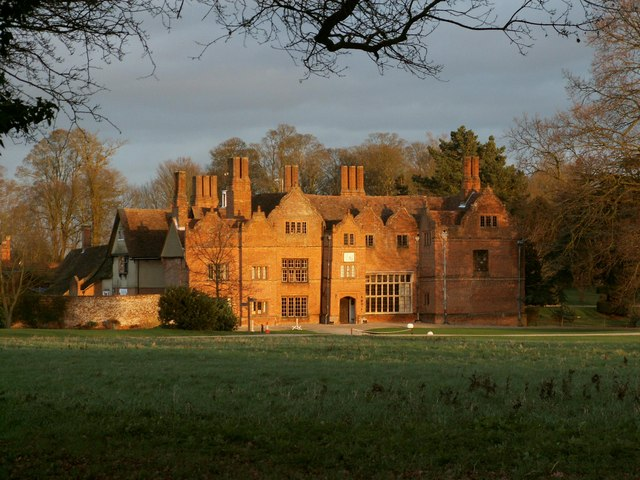
- Spains Hall

Additional information
Location within Essex
51°58′45″N 0°26′34″E
Type	Country house
Location	Finchingfield, Essex
Site notes
Architectural styles	Tudor fragments, mostly Elizabethan
Owner	Jamie Oliver
Listed Building – Grade I
Official name	Spains Hall
Designated	2 May 1953
Reference no.	1138980
National Register of Historic Parks and Gardens
Official name	Spains Hall
Designated	1 July 1987
Reference no.	1000240

Spains Hall is an Elizabethan country house near Finchingfield in Essex, England. The building has been Grade I listed since 1953.

The hall is named after Hervey de Ispania, who held the manor at the time of the Domesday Book in 1086. From then until 2019, the land was continuously owned and occupied by three families: the de Ispania family, the Kempe family, who acquired it when Margery de Ispania married Nicholas Kempe in the early fifteenth century, and the Ruggles family (later the Ruggles-Brise family).

== History ==
Engraving of Spains Hall, c.1833 by William Henry Bartlett

After the Kempe line ended, the house was bought in 1760 by Samuel Ruggles, a clothier from Bocking. His descendants, the Ruggles-Brise family, lived in the house until it was sold to Jamie Oliver in 2019. Other occupants include Sir Edward Ruggles-Brise, 1st Baronet (1882–1942), and his son, Sir John Ruggles-Brise, 2nd Baronet (1908–2007).

== The house and land ==
The current house dates to c. 1570, with earlier remains that include part of a medieval king post roof. The principal façade was remodelled by William Kempe in approximately 1585 and Dutch gables were added by Robert Kempe in 1637.

A park of approximately 7 hectares surrounding the house was landscaped to a plan by Humphry Repton near 1807. The new landscaping remade some of the series of early seventeenth-century fishponds as ornamental water features, which gradually, are being restored today. Nearer the house are a large (2 hectare) and early (sixteenth-century) walled garden, and a mid-nineteenth-century formal garden. The grounds also include the remains of a moat around an earlier house. The house was designated as a Grade I listed building in 1953.

The listing summary completed in 1953 includes this summary: "Great house. Circa 1570, with C17, C18 and C19 additions, incorporating a fragment of an earlier house, c.1400-50. Red brick, mainly English bond, some Flemish bond, with some plastered timber framing, roofed with handmade red clay tiles".

The eighteenth-century dovecote and nineteenth-century coach house and stables were converted in 2005 into an Essex venue for weddings, conferences, and other events. Conversion of Spains Hall followed and in 2010 it was opened to civil ceremonies, wedding receptions, parties, and corporate events.

Bakers of Danbury undertook restoration works to Spains Hall, winning the RICS East of England (Building Conservation category) award in 2011 for their work.

In January 2019 the house was purchased by Jamie Oliver. The family moved into the building that year and made some changes, according to a news report: "Along with the greenhouse, the application also sought to make changes and repairs to windows in two bedrooms and the bay window in one of the mansion’s drawing rooms". As of early 2021, the website for the Spains Hall Estate, now separate from the Hall itself, indicated that paying guests were accepted in self-catering cottages and a campsite; tour tickets were also available as were tickets to photography tours and "farm rides".

== Television appearances ==
Spains Hall features in Around The Village Green, a short black-and-white film about English village life from 1937 that is available online. It has also been seen on television in The Only Way Is Essex, and an episode of the BBC's Antiques Road Trip from March 2014 in which the owner, Sir Timothy Ruggles-Brise, recounts a tale of murder, mystery, and sunken treasure.
