= Finchingfield =

Village in Essex, England

Coordinates: 51.96747°N 0.44995°E

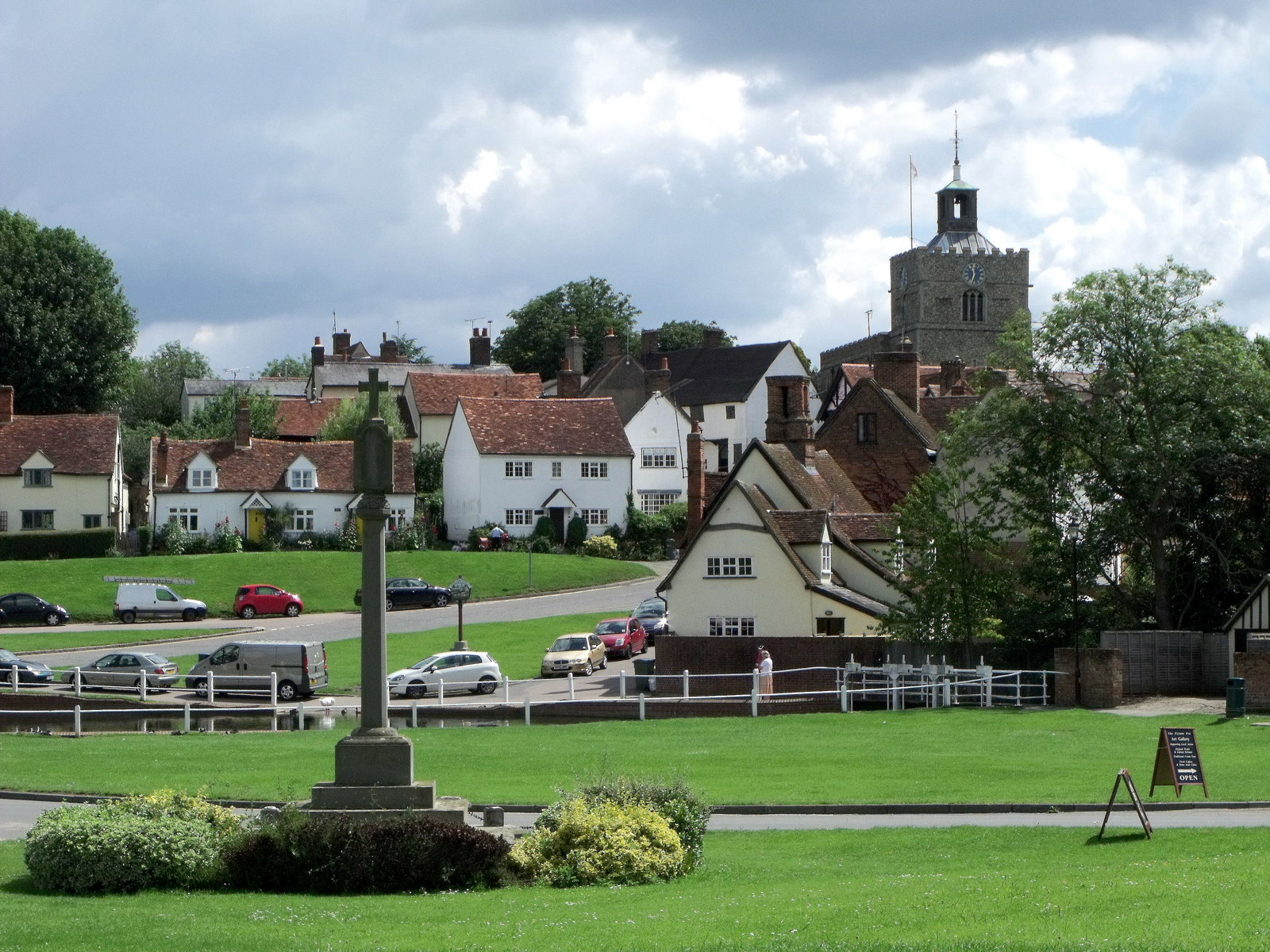
- Finchingfield village green

- Location within Essex
- Population: 1,443 (Parish, 2021)
- OS grid reference: TL683327
  - London: 40 mi (64 km) SW
- Civil parish: Finchingfield
- District: Braintree
- Shire county: Essex
- Region: East
- Country: England
- Sovereign state: United Kingdom
- Post town: BRAINTREE
- Postcode district: CM7
- Dialling code: 01371
- Police: Essex
- Fire: Essex
- Ambulance: East of England
- UK Parliament: Braintree

Finchingfield is a village and civil parish in the Braintree district of North Essex, England, a primarily rural area. It is approximately 6 miles (10 km) from Thaxted, with the nearest larger towns being Saffron Walden and Braintree. At the 2021 census the parish had a population of 1,443.

Nearby villages include Great Bardfield, Great Sampford, and Wethersfield.

== History ==
There has been a settlement in Finchingfield since historical records of the area began. Archaeological evidence suggests a Roman villa once stood 400 metres south-southwest of today's village church. The place-name 'Finchingfield ' is first attested in the Domesday Book of 1086, where it appears as Fincingefelda, meaning 'the field of Finc or his people'. The village was an official stop for horse-drawn coaches travelling from London to Norwich.

Spains Hall, the nearby Elizabethan country house, was built in the early fifteenth century. The hall is named after Hervey de Ispania, who held the manor at the time of the 1086 Domesday Book. Since then, the land has been owned by four families: the de Ispania family, the Kempe family, who acquired it when Margery de Ispania married Nicholas Kempe in the early fifteenth century, the Ruggles family (later the Ruggles-Brise family), and currently celebrity chef Jamie Oliver with wife Jools and their 5 children. The hall was the hub of the community, those families owning much of the village, and employing most of the villagers.

== Community ==
Finchingfield and Cornish Hall End combined had a population of 1,471 at the United Kingdom Census 2011.

The ecclesiastical parish covering Finchingfield includes Cornish Hall End, Shalford, and Wethersfield.

Societies and clubs founded in Finchingfield, include The Finchingfield Society, the Horticultural Society, the Royal British Legion, and Finchingfield Cricket Club.

It often is called the most beautiful village in England, a "picture-postcard" village and one of the most photographed, with a duck pond and village green surrounded by Georgian and medieval cottages; St John the Baptist Church on the hill; an eighteenth-century windmill; three public houses; Post Office; tea rooms; a hall; a primary school; and a doctor's surgery.

Finchingfield was the home and is the burial place of Dodie Smith, whose books include The Hundred and One Dalmatians (1956). She lived in The Barretts at Howe Street, a hamlet in the parish about 1.5 miles (2.4 km) from the village.

The 2013 Sky series Chickens was filmed in the village. The series concerns three young men who avoided going to fight during the First World War, written by and starring Simon Bird and Joe Thomas.

The village is on the route of the Dunwich Dynamo annual cycle ride.

== Notable people ==
- Thomas Howard, 21st Earl of Arundel
- Norman Lewis, travel writer, novelist, founder of Survival International
- Dodie Smith, author of The Hundred and One Dalmatians
- A J A Symons, author of The Quest For Corvo, an acclaimed biography of the author Frederick Rolfe.
- Janie Terrero (1858 – 1944), militant suffragette born here.
- Jamie Oliver, chef, TV personality and author

== Gallery ==
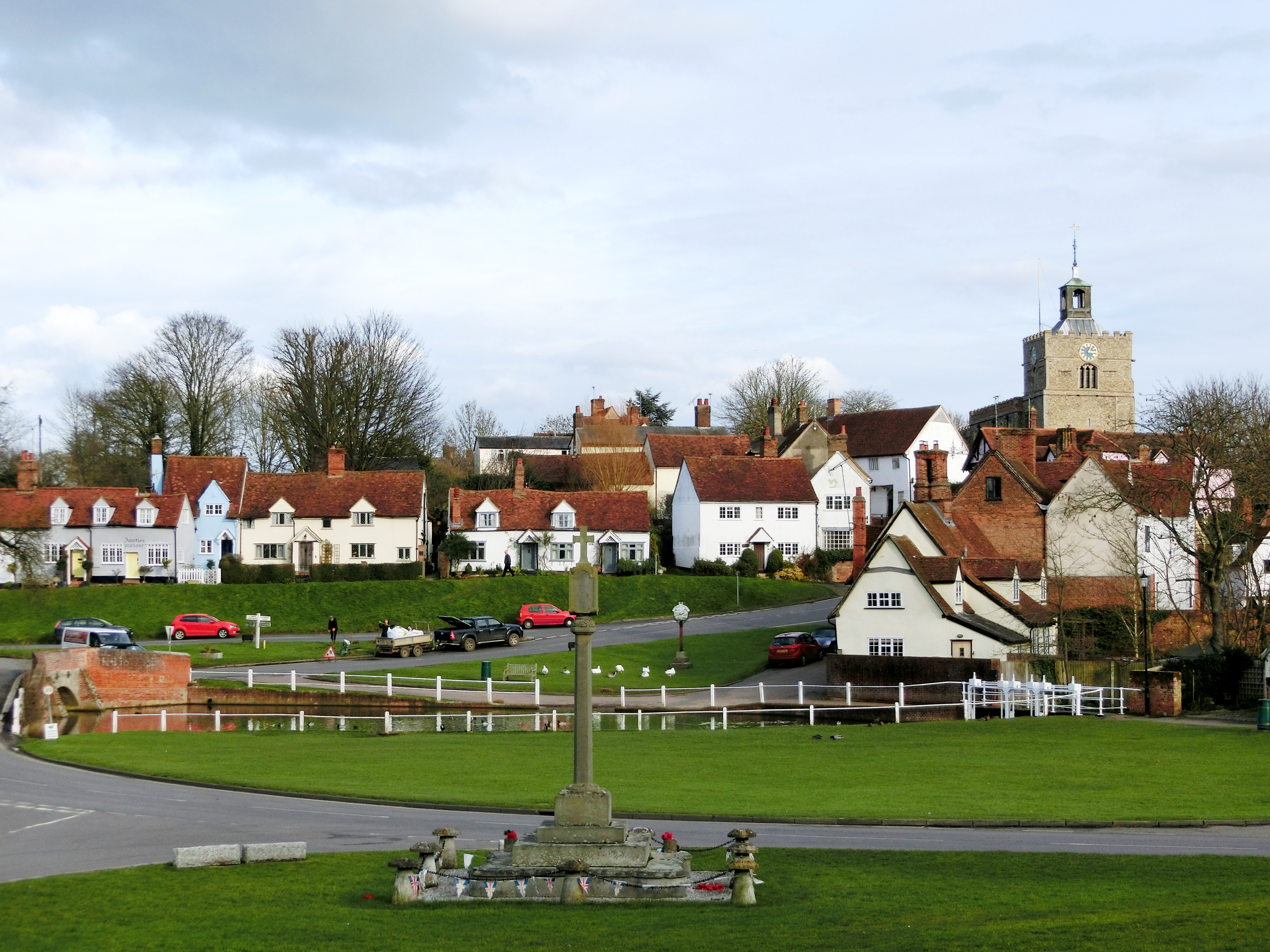
A quintessential English village.

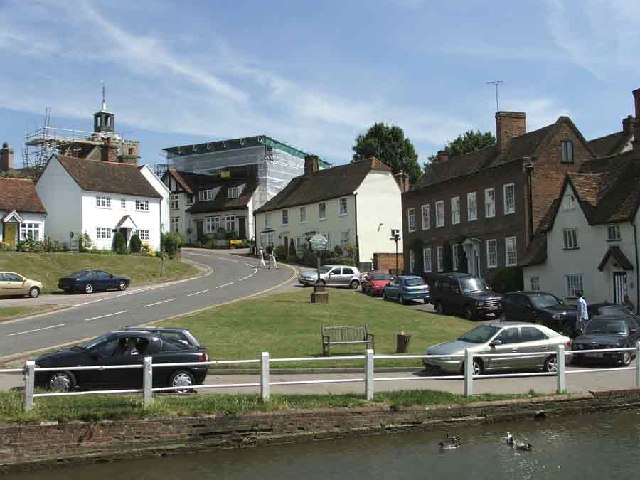
Finchingfield, June 2005

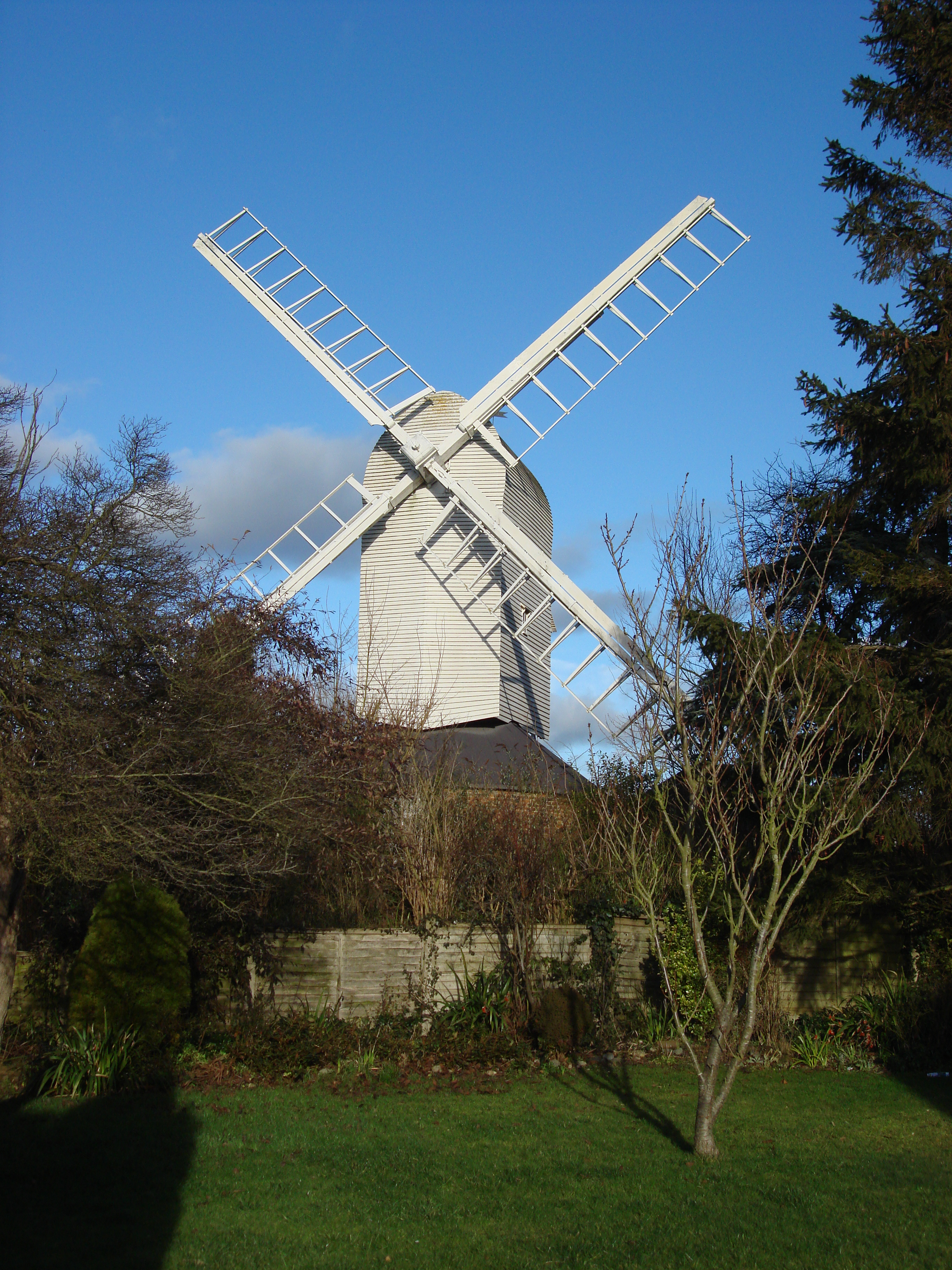
Finchingfield post mill

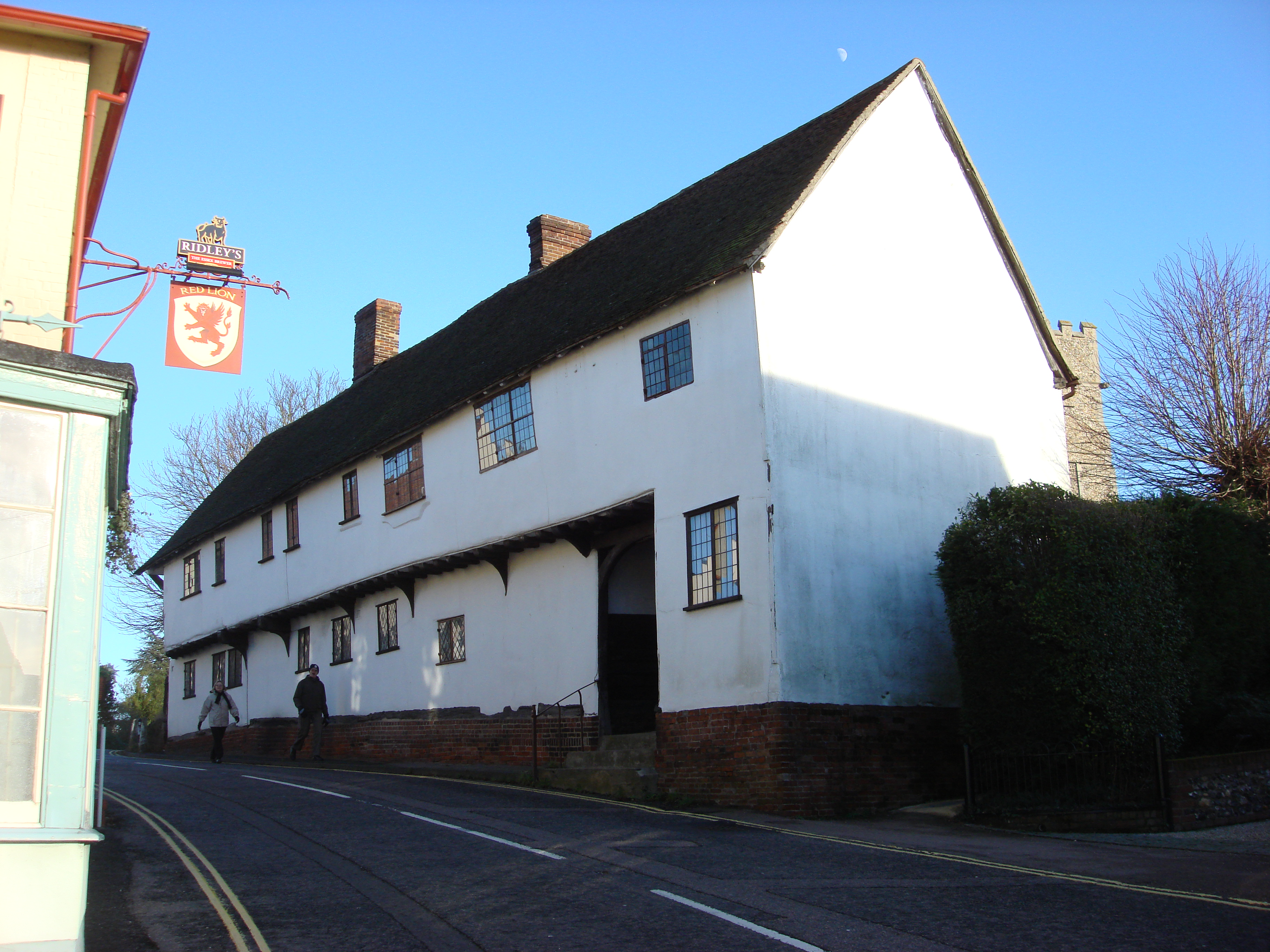
Finchingfield Guildhall (before 2011-2013 restoration)

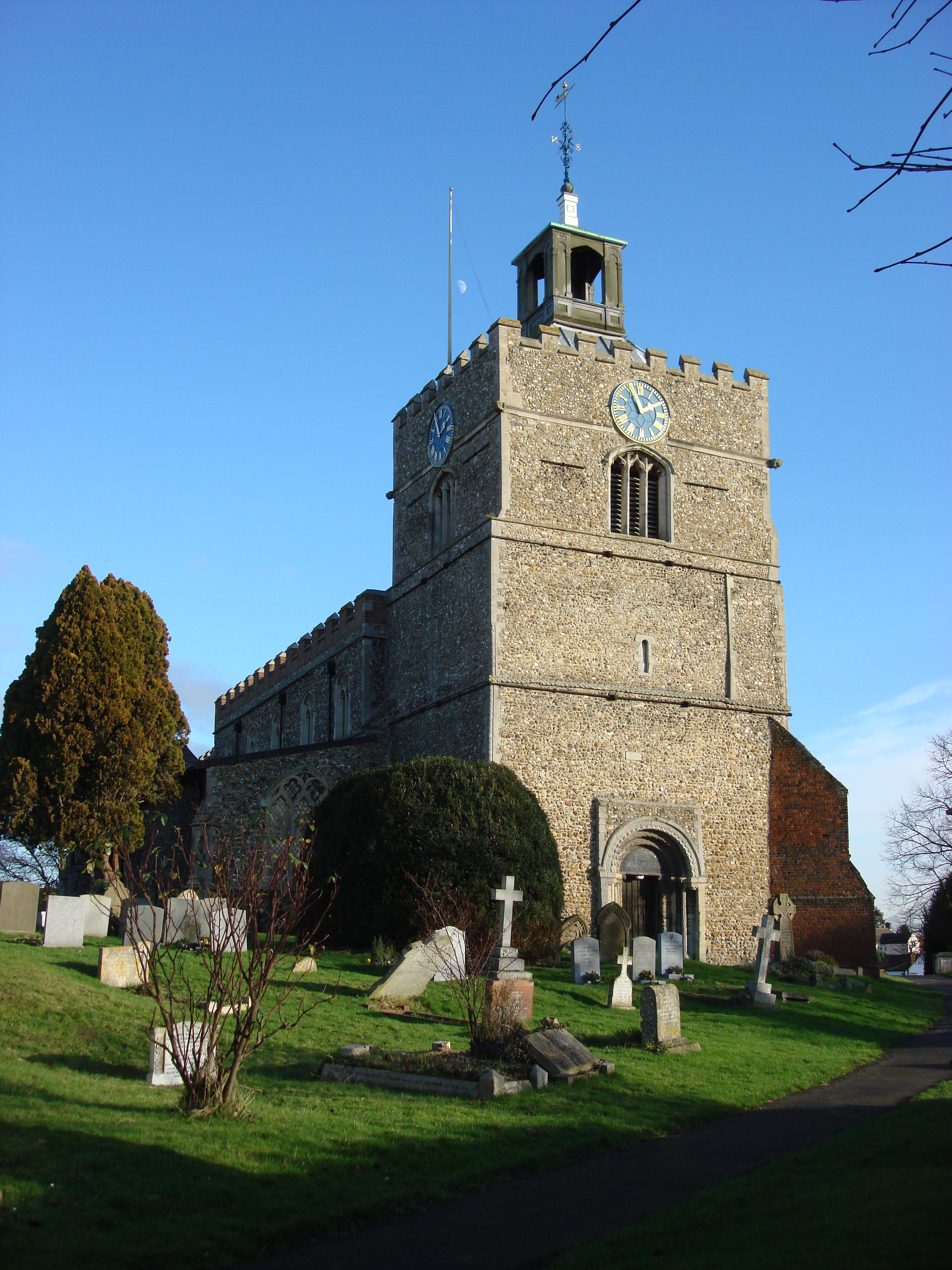
The church of St. John the Baptist

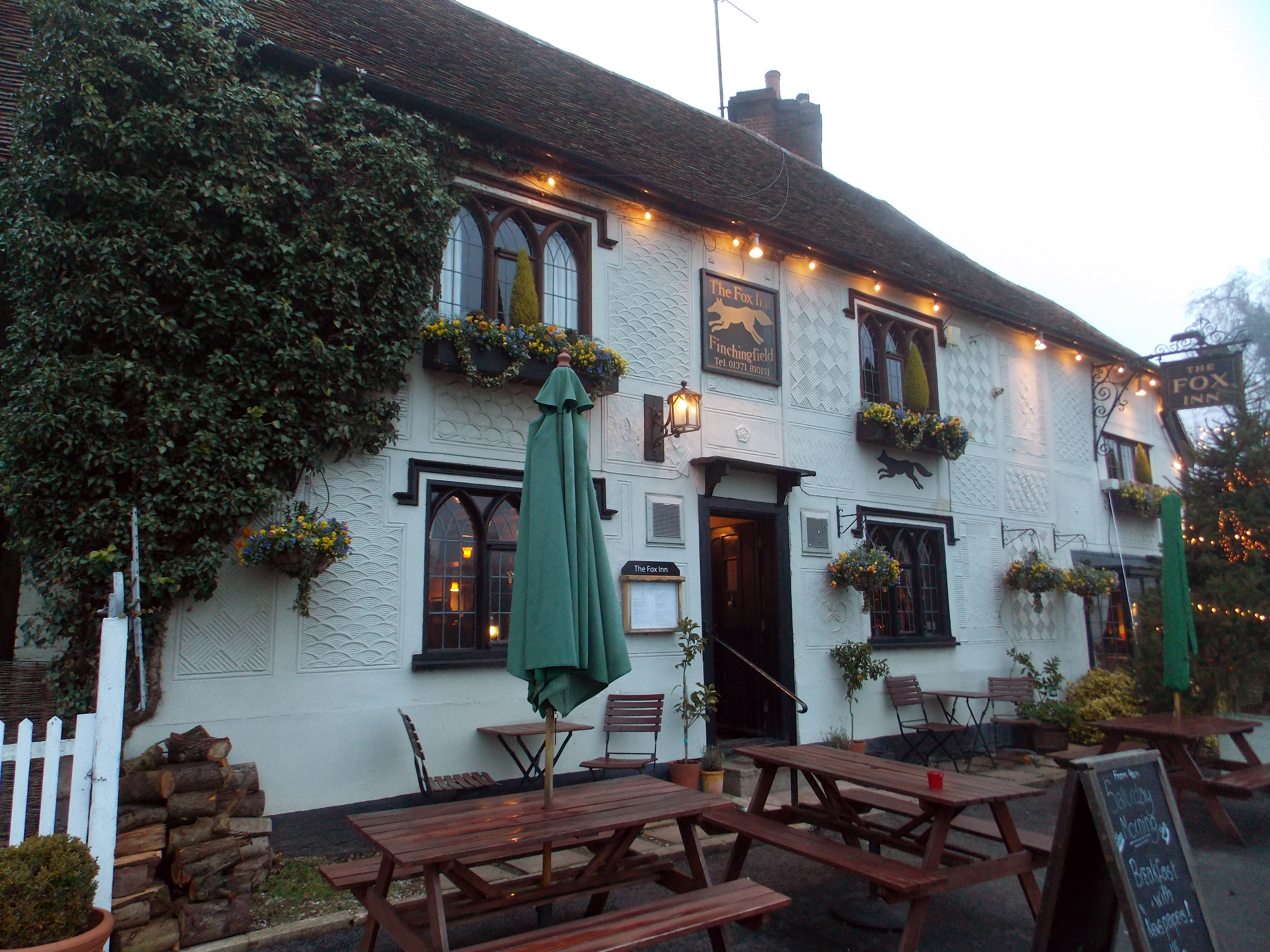
The Fox Inn, Finchingfield

== See also ==
- The Hundred Parishes
