= Tristram Conyers =

English lawyer and politician

Tristram Conyers (5 September 1619 – 6 August 1684) was an English lawyer and politician who sat in the House of Commons in 1660.

Conyers was the son of William Conyers of Walthamstow, Essex and his wife Mary Hervey, daughter of Sir Francis Hervey. He was educated at Merchant Taylor's School and later entered Middle Temple.

In 1660, Conyers was elected Member of Parliament for Maldon in the Convention Parliament. He became a serjeant at law on 29 January 1674.

Conyers died at the age of 64.

Conyers married Winefred Gerard, daughter of Sir Gilbert Gerard, 1st Baronet of Harrow on the Hill. His son Sir Gerard Conyers was Lord Mayor of London.
