= Parliamentary constituencies in Essex =

The county of Essex in relation to England

The county of Essex (which includes the unitary authorities of Southend-on-Sea and Thurrock) is divided into 18 parliamentary constituencies (sub-classified into six of borough type and twelve of county status, affecting the level of expenses permitted and status of returning officer).

The county saw the majority of its population and seats removed on the creation of the county of Greater London in 1965. Since then, the Conservatives have won a majority of the seats in the revised county. In the 2019 general election, all of Essex's seats were won by Conservative MPs by more than 50% of the vote. However, at the 2024 election, the Conservatives were reduced to ten seats, held on significantly reduced majorities. Labour won five seats, Reform UK two seats, and the Liberal Democrats one.

== Constituencies ==
Conservative† Labour‡ Liberal Democrat¤ Reform# Count Binface§

Constituency (Note: BC denotes borough constituency, CC denotes county constituency.)	Electorate	Majority	Member of Parliament	Nearest opposition	Map
Basildon and Billericay BC	76,873	20	Richard Holden †	Alex Harrison ‡	
Braintree CC	77,781	3,670	James Cleverly †	Matthew Wright ‡	
Brentwood and Ongar CC	75,352	5,980	Alex Burghart †	Paul Godfrey #	
Castle Point BC	70,967	3,251	Rebecca Harris †	Keiron McGill #	
Chelmsford BC	76,972	4,753	Marie Goldman ¤	Vicky Ford †	
Clacton CC	78,703	12,784	Nigel Farage #	Count Binface §	
Colchester BC	78,662	8,250	Pam Cox ‡	James Cracknell †	
Epping Forest CC	72,229	5,682	Neil Hudson †	Rosalind Doré ‡	
Harlow CC	74,683	2,504	Chris Vince ‡	Hannah Ellis †	
Harwich and North Essex CC	76,579	1,162	Bernard Jenkin †	Alex Diner ‡	
Maldon CC	78,281	6,906	John Whittingdale †	Pamela Walford #	
North West Essex CC	79,824	2,610	Kemi Badenoch †	Issy Waite ‡	
Rayleigh and Wickford CC	76,576	5,621	Mark Francois †	Grant Randall #	
South Basildon and East Thurrock CC	72,314	98	James McMurdock (Note: Elected from Reform UK in 2024, McMurdock left the party in July 2025.)	Jack Ferguson ‡	
Southend East and Rochford CC	70,217	4,027	Bayo Alaba ‡	Gavin Haran †	
Southend West and Leigh BC	75,154	1,949	David Burton-Sampson ‡	Anna Firth †	
Thurrock BC	73,405	6,474	Jen Craft ‡	Sophie Preston-Hall #	
Witham CC	79,072	5,145	Priti Patel †	Rumi Chowdhury ‡	

== 2024 Boundary changes ==
Former name
1. Basildon and Billericay BC
2. Braintree CC
3. Brentwood and Ongar CC
4. Castle Point BC
5. Chelmsford BC
6. Clacton CC
7. Colchester BC
8. Epping Forest CC
9. Harlow CC
10. Harwich and North Essex CC
11. Maldon CC
12. Rayleigh and Wickford CC
13. Rochford and Southend East CC
14. Saffron Walden CC
15. South Basildon and East Thurrock CC
16. Southend West BC
17. Thurrock BC
18. Witham CC
Boundaries 2010–2024

Current name
1. Basildon and Billericay BC
2. Braintree CC
3. Brentwood and Ongar CC
4. Castle Point BC
5. Chelmsford BC
6. Clacton CC
7. Colchester BC
8. Epping Forest CC
9. Harlow CC
10. Harwich and North Essex CC
11. Maldon CC
12. North West Essex CC
13. Rayleigh and Wickford CC
14. South Basildon and East Thurrock CC
15. Southend East and Rochford CC
16. Southend West and Leigh BC
17. Thurrock BC
18. Witham CC
Boundaries 2024-present

For the 2023 review of Westminster constituencies, which redrew the constituency map ahead of the 2024 United Kingdom general election, the Boundary Commission for England retained the number of constituencies in Essex at eighteen, with minor boundary changes to reflect changes to electoral wards within the county and to bring the electorates within the statutory range. The commission opted to rename Southend West to Southend West and Leigh (although the town of Leigh-on-Sea had already been part of the Southend West constituency prior to the boundary changes), and rename Rochford and Southend East to Southend East and Rochford to acknowledge that Southend-on-Sea had achieved city status during the course of the review. In addition, Saffron Walden was renamed North West Essex. These changes came into effect from the 2024 general election.

== Results history ==
Primary data source: House of Commons research briefing - General election results from 1918 to 2019

=== 2024 ===
The number votes cast for each political party who fielded candidates in constituencies comprising Essex in the 2024 general election were as follows:

Party	Votes	%	Change from 2019	Seats	Change from 2019
Conservative	270,382	32.9%	▼31.6%	10	▼8
Labour	235,891	28.7%	▲7.5%	5	▲5
Reform	179,977	21.9%	New	2	▲2
Liberal Democrats	78,238	9.5%	▼1.1%	1	▲1
Greens	42,582	5.2%	▲2.9%	0	Steady
Others	14,054	1.7%	▲0.3%	0	Steady
Total	821,124	100.0		18	

=== 2019 ===
The number of votes cast for each political party who fielded candidates in constituencies comprising Essex in the 2019 general election were as follows:

Party	Votes	%	Change from 2017	Seats	Change from 2017
Conservative	577,118	64.5%	▲6.0%	18	0
Labour	189,471	21.2%	▼7.8%	0	0
Liberal Democrats	95,078	10.6%	▲4.8%	0	0
Greens	20,438	2.3%	▲0.8%	0	0
Others	12,502	1.4%	▼3.8%	0	0
Total	894,607	100.0		18	

=== Percentage votes ===
Election year	1974 (Feb)	1974 (Oct)	1979	1983	1987	1992	1997	2001	2005	2010	2015	2017	2019	2024
Conservative	40.3	40.9	52.5	51.9	54.1	53.9	40.3	42.8	46.0	49.2	50.3	58.5	64.5	32.9
Labour	32.9	35.2	28.9	17.8	18.9	23.5	36.4	34.7	28.9	18.6	18.4	29.0	21.2	28.7
Reform	-	-	-	-	-	-	-	-	-	-	-	-	-	21.9
Liberal Democrat^{1}	26.7	23.8	17.7	29.7	26.6	21.7	18.2	16.7	19.1	21.3	6.7	5.8	10.6	9.5
Green Party	-	-	-	-	*	*	*	*	*	1.0	3.0	1.5	2.3	5.2
UKIP	-	-	-	-	-	-	*	*	*	4.1	20.5	4.6	*	*
Other	-	0.1	0.9	0.6	0.3	1.0	5.0	5.8	6.0	5.8	1.1	0.6	1.4	1.7

^{1}1974 & 1979 - Liberal Party; 1983 & 1987 - SDP–Liberal Alliance

* Included in Other

=== Seats ===
Election year	1974 (Feb)	1974 (Oct)	1979	1983	1987	1992	1997	2001	2005	2010	2015	2017	2019	2024
Conservative	11	11	12	15	16	15	10	11	13	17	17	18	18	10
Labour	3	3	2	1	0	1	6	5	3	0	0	0	0	5
Reform	-	-	-	-	-	-	-	-	-	-	-	-	-	2
Liberal Democrat^{1}	0	0	0	0	0	0	1	1	1	1	0	0	0	1
UKIP	-	-	-	-	-	-	0	0	0	0	1	0	0	0
Total	14	14	14	16	16	16	17	17	17	18	18	18	18	18

^{1}1974 & 1979 - Liberal Party; 1983 & 1987 - SDP–Liberal Alliance

=== Maps ===
==== 1885-1910 ====
1885

1886

1892

1895

1900

1906

Jan 1910

Dec 1910

==== 1918-1945 ====
1918

1922

1923

1924

1929

1931

1935

1945

==== 1950-1970 ====
1950

1951

1955

1959

1964

1966

1970

==== 1974-present ====
Feb 1974

Oct 1974

1979

1983

1987

1992

1997

2001

2005

2010

2015

2017

2019

2024

== Historical representation by party ==
A cell marked → (with a different colour background to the preceding cell) indicates that the previous MP continued to sit under a new party name.

Key: bulk or all of areas marked † form part of present-day Greater London.

=== 1852 to 1885 ===
Conservative Independent Whig Liberal Radical Whig

Constituency	1852	53	54	57	1857	57	59	1859	60	1865	67	1868	70	1874	78	1880	83
Colchester	Manners			Rebow				Papillon		Rebow			Learmonth			Causton	
Colchester	Hawkins				Miller						Karslake	Brewer		Mackworth-Praed		Willis	
Harwich	Peacocke	J. Bagshaw					Jervis-White-Jervis									Tyler	
Harwich	Waddington				Warburton	R. J. Bagshaw		Campbell	Rowley	Kelk							
Maldon	Du Cane		Peacocke		T. S. Western			→		Earle		Bentall		Sandford	Courtauld		
Maldon	Miller		Bramley-Moore					Peacocke									
North Essex / E Essex (1868)	Tyrell				Du Cane							Round					
North Essex / E Essex (1868)	Beresford									T. B. Western		Ruggles-Brise					Strutt
South Essex	Bowyer-Smijth				Wingfield-Baker			Perry-Watlington		Selwin-Ibbetson		Wingfield-Baker		Baring			
South Essex	Bramston									Cecil		Johnston		Makins			
West Essex												Cecil					
West Essex												Selwin-Ibbetson					

=== 1885 to 1918 ===
Conservative Independent Labour Independent Labour Party Labour Liberal Liberal-Labour

Constituency	1885	1886	88	92	1892	93	94	95	1895	97	1900	01	1906	08	Jan 1910	Dec 1910	11	12	17
Chelmsford	Beadel			Usborne							Rasch			Pretyman					
Colchester	Trotter		Greville		Naylor-Leyland			Pearson							Worthington-Evans				
Epping	Selwin-Ibbetson				Lockwood														Colvin
Essex South East	Makins	Rasch									Tufnell		Whitehead		Kirkwood			Guinness	
Harwich	Round												Lever		Newton				
Maldon	Kitching	Gray			Dodd				Strutt				T. Bethell		Flannery				
Saffron Walden	Gardner								Gold		Wodehouse	Pease			Proby	Beck			
Romford†	Westlake	Theobald					Money-Wigram			Sinclair			J. Bethell						
Walthamstow†	Buxton	Makins			Byrne					Woods	Morgan		Simon						
West Ham North†	Cook	Fulton			Grove				Gray				Masterman				de Forest		
West Ham South†	Leicester	Banes			Hardie	→			Banes				Thorne						

=== 1918 to 1945 ===
British Socialist (1919-20) / Communist (1920-22) Coalition Liberal (1918-22) / National Liberal (1922-23) Coalition National Democratic & Labour Common Wealth Conservative Constitutionalist Independent Labour Liberal National Liberal (1931-68) National Socialist

Constituency	1918	18	19	20	21	1922	1923	1924	24	26	27	28	1929	31	1931	34	1935	37	40	42	45
Chelmsford	Pretyman						Robinson	Curtis-Bennett		Howard-Bury					Henderson		Macnamara				Millington
Colchester	Worthington-Evans												Lewis								
East Ham North†	Bethell					Crook	Lawrence	Crook		Lawrence					Mayhew						
East Ham South†	Edwards					Barnes									Campbell-Jn		Barnes				
Epping	Colvin						Lyle	Churchill	→												
Essex South East	Hilder						Hoffman	Looker					Oldfield		Raikes						
Harwich	Newton					Hillary		Rice					Pybus	→			Holmes				
Ilford†	Griggs		Wise									Hamilton						Hutchinson			
Leyton East†	Malone		→	→		Alexander	Church	Alexander					Brockway		Mills						
Leyton West†	Wrightson		Newbould			Cassels							Sorensen		Sugden		Sorensen				
Maldon	Flannery					Ruggles-Brise	Crittall	Ruggles-Brise												Driberg	
Plaistow†	Thorne																				
Saffron Walden	Beck		→		→	Mitchell							Butler								
Southend	R. Guinness										G. Guinness						H. Channon				
Romford†	Martin						Rhys						Muggeridge		Hutchison		Parker				
Silvertown†	Jones	→																	Hollins		
Stratford†	Lyle					Groves															
Upton†	Wild					Margesson	Gardner	Holt					Gardner		Chotzner	Gardner					
Walthamstow East†	Johnson							Greenwood	→				Wallace		Beauchamp						
Walthamstow West†	Jesson					McEntee		Crawfurd					McEntee								

=== 1945 to 1974 ===
Common Wealth Conservative Labour Independent Group (1949-50) Labour National Liberal (1931-68)

Constituency	1945	46	49	1950	1951	54	1955	56	57	59	1959	61	1964	1966	67	68	69	1970
Leyton East†	Bechervaise																	
Silvertown†	Comyns																	
Stratford†	Nicholls																	
South East Essex	Gunter						Braine											
Barking†	Hastings										Driberg							
Chelmsford	Millington	→		Ashton									St John-Stevas					
Colchester	Smith			Alport								Buck						
Dagenham†	Parker																	
East Ham North†	Daines								Prentice									
East Ham South†	Barnes						Oram											
Epping	Manning			Davies	Finlay								Newens					Tebbit
Harwich	Holmes					Ridsdale										→		
Hornchurch†	Bing						Lagden							Lee Williams				Squire
Ilford North†	Ridealgh			Hutchinson		Iremonger												
Ilford South†	Ranger			Cooper										Shaw				Thorne
Leyton West / Leyton (1950)†	Sorensen																	
Maldon	Driberg						Harrison											
Romford†	Macpherson			Lockwood			Ledger											Leonard
Saffron Walden	Butler																	
Southend / Southend W (1950)	H. Channon									P. Channon								
Thurrock	Solley		→	Delargy														
Walthamstow E†	Wallace						Harvey							Robinson			McNair-Wilson	
Walthamstow W†	McEntee			Attlee				Redhead							Silvester			Deakins
West Ham S†	Elwyn Jones																	
West Ham N†	Lewis																	
Woodford / W & Wanstead (1964)†	Churchill												Jenkin					
Billericay				Braine			Body				Gardner			Moonman				McCrindle
Southend East				McAdden														
Chigwell							Biggs-Davison											

=== 1974 to 2010 ===
Conservative Independent Labour Liberal Democrats UKIP

Constituency	Feb 74	Oct 74	76	77	1979	80	1983	1987	88	1992	1997	2001	2005	08	08
Basildon	Moonman				Proctor		Amess				Smith				
Braintree	Newton										Hurst		Newmark		
Brentwood and Ongar	McCrindle									Pickles					
Chelmsford / West Chelmsford (1997)	St John-Stevas							Burns							
Colchester (1974−1983, 1997−) / Colc. N (1983−1997)	Buck									Jenkin	Russell				
Epping Forest	Biggs-Davison								Norris		Laing				
Harlow	Newens						Hayes				Rammell				
Harwich	Ridsdale									Sproat	Henderson		Carswell		
Maldon / S Colchester & Maldon (1983) / Maldon & E Chelmsford (1997)	Wakeham									Whittingdale					
Southend East / Rochford & S'end E (1997)	McAdden					Taylor							Duddridge		
Saffron Walden	Kirk			Haselhurst											
South East Essex / Castle Point (1983)	Braine									Spink	Butler	Spink		→	→
Southend West	Channon										Amess				
Thurrock	Delargy		McDonald					Janman		MacKinlay					
Billericay							Proctor	Gorman				Baron			
Rochford / Rayleigh (1997)							Clark					Francois			
North Essex											Jenkin				

=== 2010 to present ===
Conservative Independent Labour Liberal Democrats Reform UKIP

Constituency	2010	14	2015	17	2017	2019	22	2024	25
Basildon & Billericay	Baron							Holden	
Braintree	Newmark		Cleverly						
Brentwood and Ongar	Pickles				Burghart				
Castle Point	Harris								
Chelmsford	Burns				Ford			Goldman	
Clacton	Carswell	→		→	Watling			Farage	
Colchester	Russell		Quince					Cox	
Epping Forest	Laing							Hudson	
Harlow	Halfon							Vince	
Harwich & North Essex	Jenkin								
Maldon	Whittingdale								
Rayleigh & Wickford	Francois								
Rochford & Southend East / S.E. & R. (2024)	Duddridge							Alaba	
Saffron Walden / NW Essex (2024)	Haselhurst				Badenoch				
South Basildon & East Thurrock	Metcalfe							McMurdock	→
Southend West / Southend W & Leigh (2024)	Amess						Firth	Burton-Sampson	
Thurrock	Doyle-Price							Craft	
Witham	Patel								

== See also ==
- Parliamentary constituencies in the East of England
- History of parliamentary constituencies and boundaries in Essex
- Historical list of parliamentary constituencies in Essex
- List of former parliamentary constituencies in Essex
