= History of parliamentary constituencies and boundaries in Essex =

The ceremonial county of Essex, which includes the unitary authorities of Southend-on-Sea and Thurrock, has returned 18 MPs to the UK Parliament since 2010.

As a result of the creation of Greater London under the London Government Act 1963, which came into effect on 1 April 1965, the boundaries of the historic/administrative county were significantly altered, with the south-western corner, representing a majority of its population and seats, being transferred to Greater London, forming the London Boroughs of Newham, Barking and Dagenham, Havering, Redbridge and Waltham Forest. This was reflected in the following redistribution of parliamentary seats which came into effect for the February 1974 general election and effectively reduced the county's representation from 26 to 12 MPs.

== Number of seats ==
The table below shows the number of MPs representing Essex at each major redistribution of seats affecting the county.

	Current county		London area		
Year	County seats^{1}	Borough seats^{1}	County seats^{1}	Borough seats^{1}	Total
Prior to 1832	2	6	Included in current county		8
1832–1868	4	6	Included in current county		10
1868–1885	6	4	Included in current county		10
1885–1918	6	1	2	2	11
1918–1945	7	1	1	11	20
1945–1950	8	1	1	16	26
1950–1955	8	2	0	14	24
1955–1965	10	2	0	14	26
1965–1974	10	2	Part of Greater London		12
1974–1983	10	4	Part of Greater London		14
1983–1997	11	5	Part of Greater London		16
1997–2010	12	5	Part of Greater London		17
2010–present	12	6	Part of Greater London		18

^{1}Prior to 1950, seats were classified as County Divisions or Parliamentary Boroughs. Since 1950, they have been classified as County or Borough Constituencies.

== Timeline ==
County seat Borough seat

=== Prior to 1885 ===
Constituency	Prior to 1832	1832–1868	1868–1885
Essex	1290–1832 (2 MPs)		
North Essex		1832–1868 (2 MPs)	
East Essex			1868–1885 (2 MPs)
Harwich	1604–1868 (2 MPs)		1868–1885
Colchester	1295–1885 (2 MPs)		
Maldon	1332–1868 (2 MPs)		1868–1885
West Essex			1868–1885 (2 MPs)
South Essex		1832–1885 (2 MPs)	

=== From 1885 ===
==== Current ceremonial county ====
Constituency	1885-1918	1918-1945	1945-1950	1950-1955	1955-1974	1974-1983	1983-1997	1997-2010	2010-2024	2024-present
Harwich	1885-2010									
Clacton									2010–present	
Harwich and North Essex									2010–present	
North Essex								1997-2010		
North Colchester							1983-1997			
Colchester	1885-1918	1918-1983						1997–present		
South Colchester and Maldon							1983-1997			
Maldon	1885-1983								2010–present	
Maldon and East Chelmsford								1997-2010		
Witham									2010–present	
Braintree						1974–present				
Chelmsford	1885-1997								2010–present	
West Chelmsford								1997-2010		
Saffron Waldon	1885-2024									
North West Essex										2024-present
Epping (part from 1918)^{1}	1885-1974									
Harlow						1974–present				
Chigwell				1950-1974						
Epping Forest						1974–present				
Brentwood and Ongar						1974–present				
Billericay				1950-1974			1983-2010			
Basildon and Billericay									2010–present	
Basildon						1974–2010				
South Basildon and East Thurrock									2010–present	
South East Essex	1885-1950				1955-1983					
Castle Point							1983–present			
Rochford							1983-1997			
Rayleigh								1997-2010		
Rayleigh and Wickford									2010–present	
Southend-on-Sea		1918-1950								
Southend East				1950-1997						
Rochford and Southend East								1997–2024		
Southend East and Rochford										2024-present
Southend West				1950-2024						
Southend West and Leigh										2024-present
Thurrock			1945-1974			1974–present				
Constituency	1885-1918	1918-1945	1945-1950	1950-1955	1955-1974	1974-1983	1983-1997	1997-2010	2010- 2024	2024-present

==== Outer London area ====
Constituency	1885–1918	1918–1945	1945–1950	1950–1955	1955–1964	1964–1974	
Romford	1885–1945		1945-->				Part of Greater London from 1965 onwards
Hornchurch			1945–1950	1950-->			Part of Greater London from 1965 onwards
Dagenham			1945-->				Part of Greater London from 1965 onwards
Barking			1945-->				Part of Greater London from 1965 onwards
East Ham North		1918-1974					Part of Greater London from 1965 onwards
East Ham South		1918-1974					Part of Greater London from 1965 onwards
Ilford		1918–1945					Part of Greater London from 1965 onwards
Ilford North			1945-->				Part of Greater London from 1965 onwards
Ilford South			1945-->				Part of Greater London from 1965 onwards
Epping (part)^{1}		1918-1974					Part of Greater London from 1965 onwards
Woodford			1945–1964				Part of Greater London from 1965 onwards
Wanstead and Woodford						1964-->	Part of Greater London from 1965 onwards
Walthamstow	1885–1918						Part of Greater London from 1965 onwards
Walthamstow East		1918-1974					Part of Greater London from 1965 onwards
Walthamstow West		1918-1974					Part of Greater London from 1965 onwards
Leyton East		1918–1950					Part of Greater London from 1965 onwards
Leyton West		1918–1950					Part of Greater London from 1965 onwards
Leyton				1950-->			Part of Greater London from 1965 onwards
West Ham North	1885–1918			1950-1974			Part of Greater London from 1965 onwards
Stratford		1918–1950					Part of Greater London from 1965 onwards
Upton		1918–1950					Part of Greater London from 1965 onwards
West Ham South	1885–1918			1950-1974			Part of Greater London from 1965 onwards
Plaistow		1918–1950					Part of Greater London from 1965 onwards
Silvertown		1918–1950					Part of Greater London from 1965 onwards
Constituency	1885–1918	1918–1945	1945–1950	1950–1955	1955–1964	1964–1974	

^{1} From 1918, Epping contained the local authorities of Woodford and Wanstead (hived off as a separate constituency in 1945), and Chingford, which were incorporated into the London Borough of Waltham Forest in 1965.

== Boundary reviews ==
Prior to 1832	Since 1290, the parliamentary county of Essex, along with all other English counties regardless of size or population, had elected two MPs (knights of the shire) to the House of Commons. The county also included three parliamentary boroughs, namely Colchester, Harwich and Maldon each returning 2 MPs (burgesses).	
1832	The Reform Act 1832 radically changed the representation of the House of Commons, with the county being divided into the Northern and Southern Divisions, both returning 2 MPs. The parliamentary boroughs all retained their 2 MPs.	
1868	Under the Representation of the People Act 1867, the county was further divided. The Northern Division was abolished and redistributed to the East and West Divisions, with both also including areas transferred from the Southern Division. The representation of the Boroughs of Harwich and Maldon was reduced to 1 MP each, thereby maintaining the overall representation of the county at 10 MPs.	
1885	Under the Redistribution of Seats Act 1885, the three 2-member county divisions were replaced by eight single-member constituencies, namely the North Eastern or Harwich Division (which absorbed the abolished Parliamentary Borough of Harwich), the Eastern or Maldon Division (which absorbed the abolished Parliamentary Borough of Maldon), the South Eastern Division, the Mid or Chelmsford Division, the Northern or Saffron Walden Division, the Western or Epping Division, the South Western or Walthamstow Division and the Southern or Romford Division. The representation of the Borough of Colchester was reduced to 1 MP and West Ham was created as a new Parliamentary Borough, divided into North and South Divisions.	Essex 1885–1918
1918	Under the Representation of the People Act 1918, the number of constituencies in Essex was increased substantially to reflect the growth of the population since 1885 in the outer London area. Outside the London area, the number of constituencies was only increased by one with the creation of the Parliamentary Borough of Southend-on-Sea which was carved out of South East Essex. The Parliamentary Borough of Colchester was converted into a county division, gaining western parts of Harwich. Other boundary changes included: Chipping Ongar from Epping to Chelmsford; Billericay from Chelmsford to South East Essex; Burnham-on-Crouch and the Dengie peninsular from South East Essex to Maldon; Halstead from Maldon to Saffron Walden; and; Great Dunmow and Hatfield Broad Oak from Epping to Saffron Walden.; In the London area: Walthamstow was split into four boroughs of Walthamstow East and West, and Leyton East and West, with the Urban District of Woodford being transferred to Epping; the Borough of West Ham was further divided into the four divisions of Stratford, Upton, Plaistow and Silvertown; and; the three new borough constituencies of Ilford and East Ham North and South were carved out of Romford, with the Urban District of Wanstead being transferred to Epping and the parish of Cann Hall being included in Leyton East. The much reduced constituency of Romford gained the then small villages of Upminster and Rainham from Chelmsford and South East Essex respectively.	Essex 1918–1945
1918		Outer London area of Essex 1918–1945
1945	The House of Commons (Redistribution of Seats) Act 1944 set up Boundary Commissions to carry out periodic reviews of the distribution of parliamentary constituencies. It also authorised an initial review to subdivide abnormally large constituencies (those exceeding an electorate of 100,000) in time for the 1945 election. This was implemented by the Redistribution of Seats Order 1945 under which Essex was allocated six additional seats: Thurrock was carved out of South East Essex; Woodford (incorporating Woodford, Wanstead and Chigwell) was created from Epping; Ilford was split into North and South Divisions; and; Romford (which had an electorate exceeding 200,000) was once again split into four constituencies with the creation of Barking, Dagenham and Hornchurch.; The boundary between South East Essex and Chelmsford was redrawn to reflect the reorganisation of local authorities since 1918.	Essex 1945-1950
1950	The Representation of the People Act 1948 reflected the reduction of population in the innermost parts of Outer London. West Ham's representation was reduced back down from four to two through the re-establishment of the North and South constituencies; and the two Leyton seats were combined to form the Leyton constituency. Outside London, the expanded Borough of Southend was split between East and West constituencies, with the former including Shoeburyness and Rochford, both previously in South East Essex, which was now renamed Billericay. The only other significant change was the transfer of the Urban District of Brentwood from Chelmsford to Romford.	Essex 1950–1955
1955	The First Periodic Review of Westminster constituencies resulted in the creation of Chigwell, primarily created from hiving off the Urban District of Chigwell from Woodford, but also including Chipping Ongar and surrounding rural areas, transferred from Chelmsford. South East Essex was re-established, comprising the Urban Districts of Benfleet, Canvey Island and Rayleigh, which were previously included in the Billericay constituency, along with Rochford, transferred back from Southend East. Billericay now comprised the Urban District of Billericay (renamed Basildon Urban District shortly afterwards), along with that of Brentwood, transferred from Romford. Following an interim review of boundaries in 1960, Woodford was renamed Wanstead and Woodford with only minor boundary changes. This came into effect for the 1964 general election. On 1 April 1965, the south-western corner of the county of Essex was incorporated into the new county of Greater London, resulting in the majority of the electorate and parliamentary constituencies being removed. As a result, the constituency of Epping was split between Essex and Greater London, with the area comprising the former Urban District of Chingford being included in the new London Borough of Waltham Forest.	Essex 1955–1974
1955		Outer London area of Essex 1955–1974
1974	The next national boundary change, following the recommendations of the Second Periodic Review, reflected the change in county boundaries arising from the creation of Greater London in 1965, but did not come into effect for a further nine years at the February 1974 election. The impact on the constituencies within the re-constituted county of Essex was as follows: A new constituency of Braintree, created primarily from parts of the Maldon constituency, including the Urban Districts of Braintree and Bocking, and Witham. It also included rural areas to the north of Chelmsford and a very small part of Saffron Walden.; To compensate for the losses to Braintree, Maldon was extended southwards, taking the Rural District of Rochford from South East Essex.; Billericay was abolished and split up, with the Urban District of Basildon forming the new constituency of Basildon, and the Urban District of Brentwood forming the basis of Brentwood and Ongar, with Chipping Ongar and surrounding rural areas being transferred from the abolished constituency of Chigwell.; Epping was abolished and split up, with the majority forming the new constituency of Harlow. The area in the south which was now in the London Borough of Waltham Forest (the former Urban District of Chingford) formed the basis of the new borough constituency of Chingford in Greater London. Remaining areas, including Waltham Abbey and the town of Epping were combined with Chigwell from the abolished constituency thereof to form the new constituency of Epping Forest.; Harwich, Colchester, Southend East, Southend West and Thurrock were unchanged.	Essex 1974–1983
1983	The Third Review reflected the 1974 local government reorganisation arising from the Local Government Act 1972 and resulted in another significant redistribution, including the addition of two more seats. The main changes were as follows: the constituency of Rochford was created, comprising primarily the District of Rochford, which had been formed from the Rural District of Rochford, previously part of the Maldon constituency, and the Urban District of Rayleigh, previously in South East Essex. It also included parts of the Borough of Chelmsford, including South Woodham Ferrers, transferred from the constituency of Chelmsford; Maldon was now extended northwards into the southern part of Colchester and renamed South Colchester and Maldon; the northern part of Colchester (which included the centre of the town) was renamed North Colchester, with western parts of the Harwich constituency added, including Brightlingsea and Wivenhoe; the remainder of South East Essex, which now comprised the District of Castle Point, was renamed Castle Point.; Billericay was re-established, comprising northern parts of Basildon, including the towns of Billericay and Wickford, and northern parts of Thurrock; and; in addition to losing parts to Rochford, Chelmsford lost a small rural area to Brentwood and Ongar but gained a small area from Braintree.	Essex 1983–1997
1997	The Fourth Review saw another increase in the number of constituencies, with the creation the constituency of North Essex, which had significant knock-on effects as described below: North Essex was created from mainly rural areas of the abolished constituencies of North Colchester, and South Colchester and Maldon, but excluding the urban area comprising the town of Colchester, which was formed as the re-established seat of Colchester, now constituted as a borough constituency. North Essex also included a small slice of the western part of Harwich; Maldon was now combined with eastern parts of the Borough of Chelmsford, transferred primarily from the abolished constituency of Chelmsford, creating the new constituency of Maldon and East Chelmsford; and; the remainder of the Chelmsford constituency, comprising the bulk of the city, formed the new constituency of West Chelmsford, which also included remaining rural areas in the north of the Chelmsford Borough which were previously part of the Braintree constituency.; Elsewhere: the town of Rochford was transferred from the constituency of Rochford to Southend East, resulting in both seats being renamed Raleigh and Rochford and Southend East respectively; there was a major realignment of the boundaries between Basildon and Billericay with the former gaining the northern part of the Borough of Thurrock from the latter, in exchange for the town of Pitsea; and; there were minor transfers from Harlow to Epping Forest (North Weald Bassett), and from Saffron Walden to Braintree.	Essex 1997–2010
2010	Under the Fifth Periodic Review of Westminster constituencies, the Boundary Commission for England increased Essex's representation again, with the creation of the constituency of Witham. Approximately half of the new seat came from the Braintree constituency, including the town of Witham itself, with parts also transferred from Colchester, North Essex, and Maldon and East Chelmsford. Further boundary changes were as follows: North Essex now included the town of Harwich from the Harwich constituency, resulting in revised names of Harwich and North Essex and Clacton; to compensate for the loss of Witham, Braintree was expanded northwards, taking the District of Braintree wards (including the town of Halstead) which had been in Saffron Waldon: Saffron Walden, in turn, took northern, rural parts of the Borough of Chelmsford from the abolished constituency of West Chelmsford; the built-up area of the city of Chelmsford now formed the re-established seat of Chelmsford, reconstituted as a borough constituency. This seat included the eastern suburbs previously in Maldon and East Chelmsford, which was abolished; the re-established constituency of Maldon took remaining parts, adding southern areas of the Borough of Chelmsford (including South Woodham Ferrers), primarily from the Rayleigh constituency; Rayleigh gained the town of Wickford from Billericay and was renamed Rayleigh and Wickford; the Billericay and Basildon constituencies were completely re-organised yet again, into the renamed constituencies of Basildon and Billericay and South Basildon and East Thurrock. The former included the town of Billericay, combined with central parts of Basildon, and the latter included southern suburbs of Basildon, Pitsea and northern and eastern areas of the Borough of Thurrock, including East Tilbury, which was transferred from the constituency of Thurrock; and; North Weald Bassett was now transferred from Epping Forest to Brentwood and Ongar.	Essex 2010–2024
2024	For the 2023 Periodic Review of Westminster constituencies, which redrew the constituency map ahead of the 2024 United Kingdom general election, the Boundary Commission for England retained the number of constituencies in Essex at 18, with minor boundary changes to reflect changes to electoral wards within the county and to bring the electorates within the statutory range. The commission opted to rename Southend West to Southend West and Leigh (although the town of Leigh-on-Sea had already been part of the Southend West constituency prior to the boundary changes), and rename Rochford and Southend East to Southend East and Rochford to acknowledge that Southend-on-Sea had achieved city status during the course of the review. In addition, Saffron Walden was renamed North West Essex.	Essex 2024–present

== See also ==
- List of parliamentary constituencies in Essex
