= Electoral history of Kemi Badenoch =

Elections featuring British politician

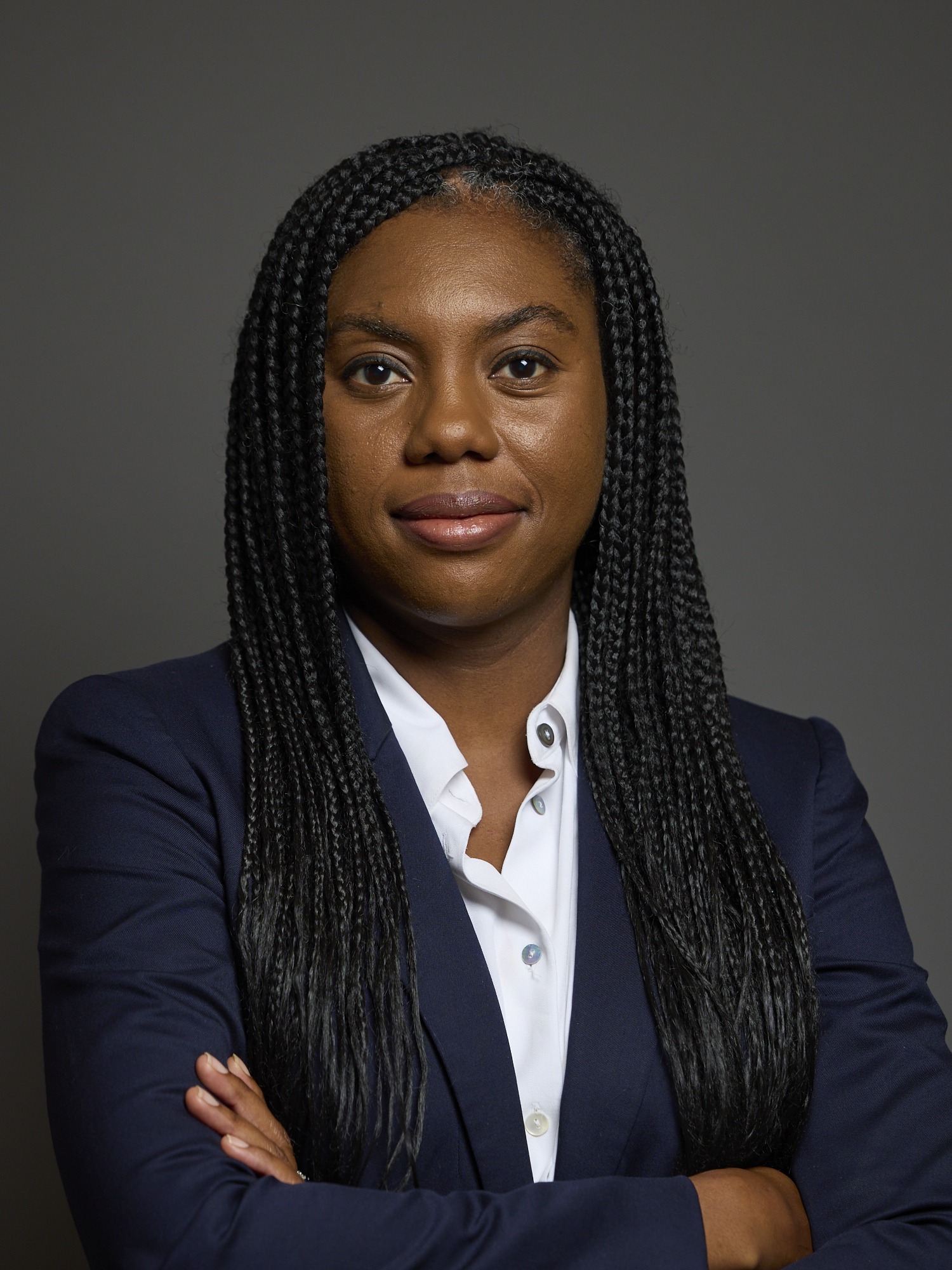
Official portrait of Kemi Badenoch, 2024

This is a summary of the electoral history of Kemi Badenoch, who has served as Leader of the Opposition and Leader of the Conservative Party since November 2024.

She has been Member of Parliament (MP) for North West Essex since 2024, and previously for Saffron Walden from 2017 to 2024.

== Parliamentary elections ==
=== 2010 general election, Dulwich and West Norwood ===
General election 2010: Dulwich and West Norwood
Party	Candidate	Votes	%	±%
Labour	Tessa Jowell	22,461	46.6	−2.3
Liberal Democrats	Jonathan Mitchell	13,096	27.2	+6.1
Conservative	Kemi Adegoke	10,684	22.2	+1.3
Green	Shane Collins	1,266	2.6	−3.7
UKIP	Elizabeth Jones	707	1.5	+0.7
Majority		9,365	19.4	−0.3
Turnout		48,214	66.2	+9.3
Registered electors		72,817		
Labour hold		Swing	-0.8	

=== 2017 general election, Saffron Walden ===
General election 2017: Saffron Walden
Party	Candidate	Votes	%	±%
Conservative	Kemi Badenoch	37,629	61.8	+4.6
Labour	Jane Berney	12,663	20.8	+9.0
Liberal Democrats	Mike Hibbs	8,528	14.0	+3.4
UKIP	Lorna Howe	2,091	3.4	−10.4
Majority		24,966	41.0	−2.4
Turnout		60,911	73.1	+1.7
Conservative hold		Swing	-2.2	

=== 2019 general election, Saffron Walden ===
General election 2019: Saffron Walden
Party	Candidate	Votes	%	±%
Conservative	Kemi Badenoch	39,714	63.0	+1.2
Liberal Democrats	Mike Hibbs	12,120	19.2	+5.2
Labour	Thomas Van De Bilt	8,305	13.2	−7.6
Green	Coby Wing	2,947	4.7	New
Majority		27,594	43.8	+2.8
Turnout		63,086	72.5	−0.6
Conservative hold		Swing	-2.0	

=== 2024 general election, North West Essex ===
General election 2024: North West Essex
Party	Candidate	Votes	%	±%
Conservative	Kemi Badenoch	19,360	35.6	–26.1
Labour	Issy Waite	16,750	30.8	+17.0
Reform	Grant StClair-Armstrong (Note: StClair-Armstrong resigned from Reform UK on 16 June 2024. As nominations had already closed, he was still identified as the Reform UK candidate on the ballot paper.)	7,668	14.1	N/A
Liberal Democrats	Smita Rajesh	6,055	11.1	–8.6
Green	Edward Gildea	2,846	5.2	+0.4
Independent	Andrew Green	852	1.6	N/A
Independent	Erik Bonino	699	1.3	N/A
Independent	Niko Omilana	156	0.3	N/A
Majority		2,610	4.8	–37.2
Turnout		54,386	68.5	–4.0
Registered electors		79,824		
Conservative hold		Swing	–21.6	

== July–September 2022 Conservative Party leadership election ==
Candidate	MPs' 1st ballot: 13 July 2022		MPs' 2nd ballot: 14 July 2022			MPs' 3rd ballot: 18 July 2022			MPs' 4th ballot: 19 July 2022			MPs' 5th ballot: 20 July 2022			Members' vote 22 July to 2 September 2022		
Candidate	Votes	%	Votes	±	%	Votes	±	%	Votes	±	%	Votes	±	%	Votes	%	% Votes cast
Liz Truss	50	14.0	64	+14	17.9	71	+7	19.8	86	+15	24.1	113	+27	31.6	81,326	47.2	57.4
Rishi Sunak	88	24.6	101	+13	28.2	115	+14	32.1	118	+3	33.1	137	+19	38.3	60,399	35.0	42.6
Penny Mordaunt	67	18.7	83	+16	23.2	82	−1	22.9	92	+10	25.8	105	+13	29.3	Eliminated		
Kemi Badenoch	40	11.2	49	+9	13.7	58	+9	16.2	59	+1	16.5	Eliminated					
Tom Tugendhat	37	10.3	32	−5	8.9	31	−1	8.7	Eliminated								
Suella Braverman	32	8.9	27	−5	7.5	Eliminated											
Nadhim Zahawi	25	7.0	Eliminated														
Jeremy Hunt	18	5.0	Eliminated														
Votes cast (Note: Due to rounding errors the sum of percentages may deviate.)	357	99.7	356	−1	99.4	357	+1	99.7	355	−2	99.4	355	0	99.2	141,725	82.2	100
Spoilt ballots	0	0.0	0	0	0.0	0	0	0.0	1	+1	0.3	2	+1	0.6	654	0.4	
Abstentions	1	0.3	2	+1	0.6	1	−1	0.3	1	0	0.3	1	0	0.3	30,058	17.4	
Registered voters	358	100.0	358	0	100.0	358	0	100.0	357	−1	100.0	358	+1	100.0	172,437	100.0	

== 2024 Conservative Party leadership election ==
Candidate	MPs' 1st ballot: 4 September 2024		MPs' 2nd ballot: 10 September 2024			MPs' 3rd ballot: 8 October 2024			MPs' 4th ballot: 9 October 2024			Members' vote: 10–31 October	
Candidate	Votes	% (Note: Percentage of voting electorate for candidates, percentage of total electorate for votes cast.)	Votes	±	%	Votes	±	%	Votes	±	%	Votes	%
Kemi Badenoch	22	18.6	28	▲6	23.5	30	▲2	25.2	42	▲12	34.7	53,806	56.5
Robert Jenrick	28	23.7	33	▲5	27.7	31	▼2	26.1	41	▲10	33.9	41,388	43.5
James Cleverly	21	17.8	21	Steady	17.6	39	▲18	32.8	37	▼2	30.6	Eliminated	
Tom Tugendhat	17	14.4	21	▲4	17.6	20	▼1	16.8	Eliminated				
Mel Stride	16	13.6	16	Steady	13.4	Eliminated							
Priti Patel	14	11.9	Eliminated										
Votes cast	118	97.5	119	▲1	98.3	120	▲1	99.2	120	Steady	99.2	95,194	72.8
Abstentions	3	2.5	2	▼1	1.7	1	▼1	0.8	1	Steady	0.8		
Registered voters	121	100.0	121	0	100.0	121	0	100.0	121	0	100.0	131,680	100.0
