= List of electoral wards in Essex =

This is a list of electoral divisions and wards in the ceremonial county of Essex in the East of England. All changes since the re-organisation of local government following the passing of the Local Government Act 1972 are shown. The number of councillors elected for each electoral division or ward is shown in brackets.

== County council ==
=== Essex ===
Electoral Divisions from 1 April 1974 (first election 12 April 1973) to 7 May 1981:

1. Bardfield (1)
2. Basildon No. 1 (Billericay) (1)
3. Basildon No. 2 (Central) (1)
4. Basildon No. 3 (Fryerns) (1)
5. Basildon No. 4 (Laindon) (1)
6. Basildon No. 5 (Langdon Hills) (1)
7. Basildon No. 6 (Pitsea) (1)
8. Basildon No. 7 (Ramsden) (1)
9. Basildon No. 8 (Wickford) (1)
10. Benfleet (Benfleet) (1)
11. Benfleet (Hadleigh) (1)
12. Benfleet (Thundersley) (1)
13. Bocking (1)
14. Braintree (1)
15. Brentwood Central (1)
16. Brentwood Hutton (1)
17. Brentwood North (1)
18. Brentwood South (1)
19. Brightlingsea (1)
20. Canvey Island (East) (1)
21. Canvey Island (West) (1)
22. Chelmsford (East) (1)
23. Chelmsford (North) (1)
24. Chelmsford (South) (1)
25. Chelmsford (West) (1)
26. Chelmsford Rural No. 1 (1)
27. Chelmsford Rural No. 2 (1)
28. Chelmsford Rural No. 3 (1)
29. Chelmsford Rural No. 4 (1)
30. Chelmsford Rural No. 5 (Great Baddo (1)
31. Chigwell (Buckhurst Hill) (1)
32. Chigwell (Chigwell) (1)
33. Chigwell (Loughton North) (1)
34. Chigwell (Loughton South) (1)
35. Clacton No. 1 (North) (1)
36. Clacton No. 2 (1)
37. Clacton No. 3 (1)
38. Coggeshall (1)
39. Colchester No. 1 (East) (1)
40. Colchester No. 2 (South) (1)
41. Colchester No. 3 (West) (1)
42. Colchester No. 4 (1)
43. Colchester No. 5 (1)
44. Dedham (1)
45. Dunmow (1)
46. Epping (1)
47. Epping & Ongar No. 1 (1)
48. Epping & Ongar No. 2 (1)
49. Epping & Ongar No. 3 (1)
50. Frinton & Walton (1)
51. Halstead (1)
52. Harlow (Great Parndon) (1)
53. Harlow (Harlow & Mark Hall) (1)
54. Harlow (Harlow Common) (1)
55. Harlow (Little Parndon & Town Centre) (1)
56. Harlow (Netteswellbury) (1)
57. Harwich (1)
58. Hedingham (1)
59. Lexden (1)
60. Maldon (1)
61. Mersea (1)
62. Rayleigh (North) (1)
63. Rayleigh (South) (1)
64. Rochford (North) (1)
65. Rochford (South) (1)
66. Rochford (West) (1)
67. Saffron Walden (1)
68. Southend No. 1 (Eastwood) (1)
69. Southend No. 2 (Prittlewell) (1)
70. Southend No. 3 (Leigh) (1)
71. Southend No. 4 (St Clements) (1)
72. Southend No. 5 (Chalkwell) (1)
73. Southend No. 6 (2)
74. Southend No. 7 (2)
75. Southend No. 8 (Shoebury) (1)
76. Southend No. 9 (Thorpe) (1)
77. Southend No. 10 (1)
78. Southend No. 11 (1)
79. Southminster (1)
80. Stansted (1)
81. Tendring Rural No. 1 (Tendring) (1)
82. Tendring Rural No. 2 (1)
83. Thaxted (1)
84. Thurrock No. 1 (Chadwell) (1)
85. Thurrock No. 2 (Grays Thurrock) (1)
86. Thurrock No. 3 (Little Thurrock) (1)
87. Thurrock No. 4 (Orsett & Stifford) (1)
88. Thurrock No. 5 (South Ockendon) (1)
89. Thurrock No. 6 (Corringham) (1)
90. Thurrock No. 7 (Tilbury) (1)
91. Thurrock No. 8 (West Thurrock & Ave (1)
92. Thurrock No. 9 (Stanford-le-Hope) (1)
93. Tollesbury (1)
94. Waltham Abbey (1)
95. Witham (1)

Electoral Divisions from 7 May 1981 to 5 May 2005:

1. Basildon Crouch (1)
2. Basildon Fryerns (1)
3. Basildon Gloucester Park (1)
4. Basildon Laindon (1)
5. Basildon Pitsea (1)
6. Basildon Vange (1)
7. Basildon Westley Heights (1)
8. Belfairs & Blenheim (1); electoral division abolished in 1998
9. Benfleet (1)
10. Billericay North (1)
11. Billericay South (1)
12. Bocking (1)
13. Braintree East (1)
14. Braintree West (1)
15. Brentwood Central (1)
16. Brentwood Hutton (1)
17. Brentwood North (1)
18. Brentwood Rural (1)
19. Brentwood South (1)
20. Brightlingsea (1)
21. Broomfield & Writtle (1)
22. Buckhurst Hill (1)
23. Canvey Island East (1)
24. Canvey Island West (1)
25. Chadwell (1); electoral division abolished in 1998
26. Chalkwell (1); electoral division abolished in 1998
27. Chelmsford East (1)
28. Chelmsford North (1)
29. Chelmsford South (1)
30. Chelmsford West (1)
31. Chigwell (1)
32. Clacton East (1)
33. Clacton North (1)
34. Clacton West (1)
35. Constable (1)
36. Corringham (1); electoral division abolished in 1998
37. Drury (1)
38. Dunmow (1)
39. Eastwood (1); electoral division abolished in 1998
40. Epping (1)
41. Frinton & Walton (1)
42. Grays Thurrock (1); electoral division abolished in 1998
43. Great Baddow (1)
44. Great Parndon (1)
45. Great Tarpots (1)
46. Hadleigh (1)
47. Halstead (1)
48. Harlow & Mark Hall (1)
49. Harlow Common (1)
50. Harwich (1)
51. Hedingham (1)
52. Leigh (1); electoral division abolished in 1998
53. Little Parndon & Town Centre (1)
54. Loughton St Johns (1)
55. Loughton St Marys (1)
56. Maldon (1)
57. Maypole (1)
58. Mersea & Stanway (1)
59. Milton (1); electoral division abolished in 1998
60. Netteswellbury (1)
61. North Weald & Nazeing (1)
62. Old Heath (1)
63. Ongar (1)
64. Orsett & Stifford (1); electoral division abolished in 1998
65. Park (1)
66. Parsons Heath (1)
67. Prittlewell (1); electoral division abolished in 1998
68. Rayleigh North (1)
69. Rayleigh South (1)
70. Rochford North (1)
71. Rochford South (1)
72. Rochford West (1)
73. Saffron Walden (1)
74. Shoebury (1); electoral division abolished in 1998
75. South Ockendon (1); electoral division abolished in 1998
76. Southchurch (1); electoral division abolished in 1998
77. Southminster (1)
78. Springfield (1)
79. Stanford-le-Hope (1); electoral division abolished in 1998
80. Stansted (1)
81. Stock (1)
82. Tendring Rural East (1)
83. Tendring Rural West (1)
84. Thaxted (1)
85. Thorpe (1); electoral division abolished in 1998
86. Thundersley (1)
87. Tilbury (1); electoral division abolished in 1998
88. Tiptree (1)
89. Tollesbury (1)
90. Victoria (1); electoral division abolished in 1998
91. Waltham Abbey (1)
92. West Thurrock & Aveley (1); electoral division abolished in 1998
93. Westborough (1); electoral division abolished in 1998
94. Wickford (1)
95. Witham Northern (1)
96. Witham Southern (1)
97. Wivenhoe St Andrew (1)
98. Woodham Ferrers & Danbury (1)

Electoral Divisions from 5 May 2005 to 7 May 2026:

1. Abbey (1)
2. Basildon Laindon Park & Fryerns (2)
3. Basildon Pitsea (2)
4. Basildon Westley Heights (1)
5. Billericay & Burstead (2)
6. Bocking (1)
7. Braintree Eastern (1)
8. Braintree Town (1)
9. Brentwood Hutton (1)
10. Brentwood North (1)
11. Brentwood Rural (1)
12. Brentwood South (1)
13. Brightlingsea (1)
14. Broomfield & Writtle (1)
15. Buckhurst Hill & Loughton South (1)
16. Canvey Island East (1)
17. Canvey Island West (1)
18. Chelmer (1)
19. Chelmsford Central (1)
20. Chelmsford North (1)
21. Chelmsford West (1)
22. Chigwell & Loughton Broadway (1)
23. Clacton East (1)
24. Clacton North (1)
25. Clacton West (1)
26. Constable (1)
27. Drury (1)
28. Dunmow (1) †
29. Epping & Theydon Bois (1)
30. Frinton & Walton (1)
31. Great Baddow (1)
32. Hadleigh (1)
33. Halstead (1)
34. Harlow North (1)
35. Harlow South East (1)
36. Harlow West (2)
37. Harwich (1)
38. Hedingham (1)
39. Heybridge & Tollesbury (1)
40. Loughton Central (1)
41. Maldon (1)
42. Maypole (1)
43. Mersea & Tiptree (1)
44. Mile End & Highwoods (1)
45. North Weald & Nazeing (1) ‡
46. Ongar & Rural (1) ‡
47. Parsons Heath & East Gates (1)
48. Rayleigh North (1)
49. Rayleigh South (1)
50. Rochford North (1)
51. Rochford South (1)
52. Rochford West (1)
53. Saffron Walden (1)
54. South Benfleet (1)
55. South Woodham Ferrers (1)
56. Southminster (1)
57. Springfield (1)
58. Stansted (1) †
59. Stanway & Pyefleet (1)
60. Stock (1)
61. Tendring Rural East (1)
62. Tendring Rural West (1)
63. Thaxted (1)
64. Three Fields with Great Notley (1)
65. Thundersley (1)
66. Waltham Abbey (1)
67. Wickford Crouch (2)
68. Witham Northern (1)
69. Witham Southern (1)
70. Wivenhoe St Andrew (1)

† minor boundary changes in 2009 ‡ minor boundary changes in 2013

Electoral Divisions from 7 May 2026 to present:

1. Billericay North (1)
2. Bocking (1)
3. Braintree Eastern (1)
4. Braintree Town (1)
5. Brentwood Hutton (1)
6. Brentwood North (1)
7. Brentwood Rural (1)
8. Brentwood South (1)
9. Brightlingsea (1)
10. Broomfield & Writtle (1)
11. Burnham & Southminster (1)
12. Burstead (1)
13. Canvey Island East (1)
14. Canvey Island West (1)
15. Castledon & Crouch (1)
16. Chelmer (1)
17. Chelmsford Central (1)
18. Chelmsford North (1)
19. Chelmsford Springfield (1)
20. Chelmsford West (1)
21. Chigwell & Buckhurst Hill East (1)
22. Clacton North (1)
23. Clacton South (1)
24. Clacton West & St Osyth (1)
25. Colchester Abbey (1)
26. Colchester Lexden (1)
27. Colchester Maypole (1)
28. Colchester North (1)
29. Colchester St Johns (1)
30. Constable (1)
31. Danbury & The Hanningfields (1)
32. Dunmow (1)
33. Epping & Theydon Bois (1)
34. Frinton & Walton (1)
35. Gloucester Park (1)
36. Great Baddow & Galleywood (1)
37. Hadleigh (1)
38. Halstead (1)
39. Harlow Common & Church Langley (1)
40. Harlow Netteswell (1)
41. Harlow Parndon & Toddbrook (1)
42. Harlow South West (1)
43. Harwich (1)
44. Hedingham (1)
45. Laindon Town (1)
46. Loughton North (1)
47. Loughton South & Buckhurst Hill West (1)
48. Maldon Rural North (1)
49. Maldon Rural South (1)
50. Maldon Town & Heybridge (1)
51. Mersea & Tiptree (1)
52. North Weald & Nazeing (1)
53. Old Harlow (1)
54. Ongar & Rural (1)
55. Pitsea (1)
56. Rayleigh South (1)
57. Rayleigh West (1)
58. Rochford East (1)
59. Rochford North (1)
60. Rochford South (1)
61. Saffron Walden (1)
62. South Benfleet (1)
63. Stansted (1)
64. Stanway & Marks Tey (1)
65. Takeley (1)
66. Tendring Rural East (1)
67. Tendring Rural West (1)
68. Thaxted (1)
69. Three Fields & Great Notley (1)
70. Thundersley (1)
71. Vange (1)
72. Waltham Abbey (1)
73. Westley Heights (1)
74. Wickford East & Bowers Gifford (1)
75. Witham Town (1)
76. Witham West & Rural (1)
77. Wivenhoe St Andrew (1)
78. Woodham Ferrers (1)

== Unitary authority councils ==
=== Southend-on-Sea ===
Wards from 1 April 1974 (first election 7 June 1973) to 6 May 1976:

1. All Saints (2)
2. Blenheim (3)
3. Chalkwell (3)
4. Eastwood (5)
5. Leigh (3)
6. Milton (3)
7. Pier (2)
8. Prittlewell (3)
9. Shoebury (3)
10. Southbourne (3)
11. Southchurch (3)
12. St Clements (3)
13. Temple Sutton (3)
14. Thorpe (4)
15. Victoria (2)
16. Westborough (3)

Wards from 6 May 1976 to 7 June 2001:

1. Belfairs (3)
2. Blenheim (3)
3. Chalkwell (3)
4. Eastwood (3)
5. Leigh (3)
6. Milton (3)
7. Prittlewell (3)
8. Shoebury (3)
9. Southchurch (3)
10. St Lukes (3)
11. Thorpe (3)
12. Victoria (3)
13. Westborough (3)

Wards from 7 June 2001 to present:

1. Belfairs (3)
2. Blenheim Park (3)
3. Chalkwell (3)
4. Eastwood Park (3)
5. Kursaal (3)
6. Leigh (3)
7. Milton (3)
8. Prittlewell (3)
9. St Laurence (3)
10. St Luke's (3)
11. Shoeburyness (3)
12. Southchurch (3)
13. Thorpe (3)
14. Victoria (3)
15. Westborough (3)
16. West Leigh (3)
17. West Shoebury (3)

=== Thurrock ===
Wards from 1 April 1974 (first election 7 June 1973) to 3 May 1979:

1. Aveley (3)
2. Chadwell St Mary (3)
3. Corringham (3)
4. Grays (6)
5. Little Thurrock (3)
6. Orsett (3)
7. South Ockendon (6)
8. Stanford-le-Hope (3)
9. Stifford (3)
10. Tilbury (3)
11. West Thurrock (3)

Wards from 3 May 1979 to 1 May 1997:

1. Aveley (3)
2. Belhus (3)
3. Chadwell St Mary (3)
4. Corringham & Fobbing (3)
5. East Tilbury (); was due to change to (2) in 1997
6. Grays Thurrock North (1)
7. Grays Thurrock Town (3)
8. Little Thurrock (3)
9. Ockendon (3)
10. Orsett (2)
11. Stanford-le-Hope (3)
12. Stifford (3)
13. The Homesteads (3)
14. Tilbury (3)
15. West Thurrock (); was due to change to (3) in 1997

Wards from 1 May 1997 to 10 June 2004:

1. Aveley (3)
2. Belhus (3)
3. Chadwell St Mary (3)
4. Chafford Hundred (2)
5. Corringham & Fobbing (2)
6. Corringham West (2)
7. East Tilbury (2)
8. Grays Riverside (3)
9. Grays Thurrock (3)
10. Little Thurrock Blackshots (2)
11. Little Thurrock Rectory (2)
12. Ockendon (3)
13. Orsett (2)
14. Stanford-le-Hope East (2)
15. Stanford-le-Hope West (2)
16. Stifford (3)
17. The Homesteads (3)
18. Tilbury Riverside (2)
19. Tilbury St Chads (2)
20. West Thurrock (3)

Wards from 10 June 2004 to 7 May 2026:

1. Aveley & Uplands (3)
2. Belhus (3)
3. Chadwell St Mary (3)
4. Chafford & North Stifford (2)
5. Corringham & Fobbing (2)
6. East Tilbury (2)
7. Grays Riverside (3)
8. Grays Thurrock (3)
9. Little Thurrock Blackshots (2)
10. Little Thurrock Rectory (2)
11. Ockendon (3)
12. Orsett (2)
13. South Chafford (2)
14. Stanford East & Corringham Town (3)
15. Stanford-le-Hope West (2)
16. Stifford Clays (2)
17. The Homesteads (3)
18. Tilbury Riverside & Thurrock Park (2)
19. Tilbury St Chads (2)
20. West Thurrock & South Stifford (3)

Wards from 7 May 2026 to present:

1. Aveley (3)
2. Belhus (3)
3. Chadwell St Mary (3)
4. Chafford Hundred East (2)
5. Chafford Hundred West (2)
6. Corringham & Fobbing (3)
7. East Tilbury, Linford & West Tilbury (2)
8. Grays Riverside (3)
9. Grays Town (3)
10. Little Thurrock Blackshots (2)
11. Little Thurrock Rectory (2)
12. Ockendon (3)
13. Orsett, Horndon & Bulphan (2)
14. Purfleet-on-Thames (2)
15. Stanford-le-Hope South (3)
16. Stifford (2)
17. The Homesteads & Stanford-le-Hope North (3)
18. Tilbury Riverside (2)
19. Tilbury St Chads (2)
20. West Thurrock & South Stifford (2)

== District councils ==
=== Basildon ===
Wards from 1 April 1974 (first election 7 June 1973) to 3 May 1979:

1. Barstable (3)
2. Billericay (3)
3. Burstead (3)
4. Buttsbury (3)
5. Castledon (4)
6. Central (3)
7. Fryerns East (3)
8. Fryerns West (3)
9. Laindon (4)
10. Langdon Hills (3)
11. Lee Chapel North (3)
12. Pitsea (3)
13. Vange (4)
14. Wickford (4)

Wards from 3 May 1979 to 2 May 2002:

1. Billericay East (3)
2. Billericay West (3)
3. Burstead (3)
4. Fryerns Central (3)
5. Fryerns East (3)
6. Laindon (3)
7. Langdon Hills (3)
8. Lee Chapel North (3)
9. Nethermayne (3)
10. Pitsea East (3)
11. Pitsea West (3)
12. Vange (3)
13. Wickford North (3)
14. Wickford South (3)

Wards from 2 May 2002 to 2 May 2024:

1. Billericay East (3)
2. Billericay West (3)
3. Burstead (3)
4. Crouch (2)
5. Fryerns (3)
6. Laindon Park (3)
7. Langdon Hills (2)
8. Lee Chapel North (3)
9. Nethermayne (3)
10. Pitsea North West (3)
11. Pitsea South East (3)
12. St Martin's (2)
13. Vange (2)
14. Wickford Castledon (2)
15. Wickford North (3)
16. Wickford Park (2)

Wards from 2 May 2024 to present:

1. Billericay East (3)
2. Billericay West (3)
3. Burstead (3)
4. Castledon & Crouch (3)
5. Fryerns (3)
6. Laindon Park (3)
7. Langdon Hills (3)
8. Lee Chapel North (3)
9. Nethermayne (3)
10. Pitsea North West (3)
11. Pitsea South East (3)
12. St. Martin's (3)
13. Wickford North (3)
14. Wickford Park (3)

=== Braintree ===
Wards from 1 April 1974 (first election 7 June 1973) to 3 May 1979:

1. No. 1 (Braintree: East) (4)
2. No. 2 (Braintree: West) (4)
3. No. 3 (Bocking: North) (3)
4. No. 4 (Bocking: South) (4)
5. No. 7 (Witham: West) (2)
6. No. 8 (Witham: North) (2)
7. No. 9 (Witham: Rivenhall North) (2)
8. No. 10 (Witham: Rivenhall South) (2)
9. No. 11 (Witham: Central) (1)
10. No. 12 (Witham: South) (1)
11. Black Notley (1)
12. Bumpstead (1)
13. Castle Hedingham (1)
14. Coggeshall (3)
15. Colne Engaine & Greenstead Green (1)
16. Cressing (1)
17. Earls Colne (2)
18. Gosfield (1)
19. Halstead Holy Trinity (3)
20. Halstead St Andrews (2)
21. Hatfield Peverel (2)
22. Kelvedon (3)
23. Panfield (1)
24. Rayne (1)
25. Sible Hedingham (2)
26. Stour Valley Central (1)
27. Stour Valley North (1)
28. Stour Valley South (1)
29. Terling (1)
30. Three Fields (2)
31. Upper Colne (1)
32. Yeldham (1)

Wards from 3 May 1979 to 1 May 2003:

Wards from 1 May 2003 to 7 May 2015:

1. Black Notley & Terling (2)
2. Bocking Blackwater (3)
3. Bocking North (2)
4. Bocking South (2)
5. Bradwell, Silver End & Rivenhall (2)
6. Braintree Central (3)
7. Braintree East (3)
8. Braintree South (3)
9. Bumpstead (1)
10. Coggeshall & North Feering (2)
11. Cressing & Stisted (1)
12. Gosfield & Greenstead Green (1)
13. Great Notley & Braintree West (3)
14. Halstead St Andrew's (3)
15. Halstead Trinity (2)
16. Hatfield Peverel (2)
17. Hedingham & Maplestead (3)
18. Kelvedon (2)
19. Panfield (1)
20. Rayne (1)
21. Stour Valley North (1)
22. Stour Valley South (1)
23. The Three Colnes (2)
24. Three Fields (2)
25. Upper Colne (1)
26. Witham Chipping Hill & Central (2)
27. Witham North (2)
28. Witham South (3)
29. Witham West (3)
30. Yeldham (1)

Wards from 7 May 2015 to present:

1. Bocking Blackwater (3)
2. Bocking North (2)
3. Bocking South (2)
4. Braintree Central & Beckers Green (3)
5. Braintree South (2)
6. Braintree West (2)
7. Bumpstead (1)
8. Coggeshall (2)
9. Gosfield & Greenstead Green (1)
10. Great Notley & Black Notley (3)
11. Halstead St Andrew's (2)
12. Halstead Trinity (2)
13. Hatfield Peverel & Terling (2)
14. Hedingham (2)
15. Kelvedon & Feering (2)
16. Rayne (1)
17. Silver End & Cressing (2)
18. Stour Valley North (1)
19. Stour Valley South (1)
20. The Colnes (2)
21. Three Fields (2)
22. Witham Central (2)
23. Witham North (2)
24. Witham South (2)
25. Witham West (2)
26. Yeldham (1)

=== Brentwood ===
Wards from 1 April 1974 (first election 7 June 1973) to 6 May 1976:

1. No. 1 (Brentwood: Central) (6)
2. No. 2 (Brentwood: Hutton East) (4)
3. No. 3 (Brentwood: Hutton West) (4)
4. No. 4 (Brentwood: Ingrave) (2)
5. No. 5 (Brentwood: Pilgrims Hatch) (3)
6. No. 6 (Brentwood: Shenfield) (3)
7. No. 7 (Brentwood: South Weald) (1)
8. No. 8 (Brentwood: Three Arch Bridge) (2)
9. No. 9 (Brentwood: Warley) (4)
10. Blackmore (1)
11. Brizes (1)
12. Doddinghurst (2)
13. Hook End & Wyatts Green (1)
14. Ingatestone & Fryerning (3)
15. Mountnessing (1)

Wards from 6 May 1976 to 2 May 2002:

1. Blackmore (1)
2. Brentwood North (3)
3. Brentwood South (3)
4. Brentwood West (3)
5. Brizes (1)
6. Doddinghurst (2)
7. Herongate & Ingrave (1)
8. Hook End & Wyatts Green (1)
9. Hutton East (3)
10. Hutton North (3)
11. Hutton South (3)
12. Ingatestone & Fryerning (3)
13. Mountnessing (1)
14. Pilgrims Hatch (3)
15. Shenfield (3)
16. South Weald (1)
17. Warley (3)
18. West Horndon (1)

Wards from 2 May 2002 to 2 May 2024:

1. Brentwood North (3)
2. Brentwood South (3)
3. Brentwood West (3)
4. Brizes & Doddinghurst (3)
5. Herongate, Ingrave & West Horndon (2)
6. Hutton Central (2)
7. Hutton East (2)
8. Hutton North (2)
9. Hutton South (2)
10. Ingatestone, Fryerning & Mountnessing (3)
11. Pilgrims Hatch (3)
12. Shenfield (3)
13. South Weald (1)
14. Tipps Cross (2)
15. Warley (3)

Wards from 2 May 2024 to present:

1. Blackmore & Doddinghurst (3)
2. Brentwood North (3)
3. Brentwood South (3)
4. Brentwood West (3)
5. Brizes, Stondon Massey & South Weald (3)
6. Herongate, Ingrave & West Horndon (3)
7. Hutton East (3)
8. Hutton North (3)
9. Hutton South (3)
10. Ingatestone, Fryerning & Mountnessing (3)
11. Pilgrims Hatch (3)
12. Shenfield (3)
13. Warley (3)

=== Castle Point ===
Wards from 1 April 1974 (first election 7 June 1973) to 3 May 1979:

1. No. 1 (Benfleet: Boyce) (4)
2. No. 2 (Benfleet: St Georges) (4)
3. No. 3 (Benfleet: St James) (4)
4. No. 4 (Benfleet: St Marys) (4)
5. No. 5 (Benfleet: St Peters) (4)
6. No. 6 (Benfleet: Victoria) (4)
7. No. 9 (Canvey Island: North) (3)
8. No. 11 (Canvey Island: West) (2)
9. No. 12 (Canvey Island: Wintergardens) (2)
10. Canvey Island Central (3)
11. Canvey Island East (3)
12. Canvey Island South (2)

Wards from 3 May 1979 to 1 May 2003:

Wards from 1 May 2003 to 2 May 2024:

1. Appleton (3)
2. Boyce (3)
3. Canvey Island Central (3)
4. Canvey Island East (3)
5. Canvey Island North (3)
6. Canvey Island South (3)
7. Canvey Island West (2)
8. Canvey Island Winter Gardens (3)
9. Cedar Hall (3)
10. St George's (3)
11. St James (3)
12. St Mary's (3)
13. St Peter's (3)
14. Victoria (3)

Wards from 2 May 2024 to present:

1. Appleton (3)
2. Canvey Island Central (3)
3. Canvey Island East (3)
4. Canvey Island North (3)
5. Canvey Island South (3)
6. Canvey Island Winter Gardens (3)
7. Hadleigh St James (3)
8. St George’s (3)
9. St Mary’s (3)
10. St Michael’s (3)
11. Tarpots (3)
12. Thundersley North (3)
13. Thundersley South (3)

=== Chelmsford ===
Wards from 1 April 1974 (first election 7 June 1973) to 6 May 1976:

1. No. 1 (Chelmsford: East) (6)
2. No. 2 (Chelmsford: North) (10)
3. No. 3 (Chelmsford: South) (7)
4. No. 4 (Chelmsford: West) (5)
5. No. 11 (Ramsden Heath & Downham) (1)
6. No. 15 (Rettendon & South Hanningfield) (1)
7. No. 22 (Runwell East) (1)
8. No. 23 (Runwell West) (1)
9. Baddow Road (2)
10. Boreham & Springfield (2)
11. Broomfield & Chignall (2)
12. Danbury & Sandon (3)
13. East & West Hanningfield (1)
14. Galleywood (2)
15. Good Easter-Mashbury-Roxwell (1)
16. Great & Little Leighs & Little Waltham (1)
17. Great Baddow Village (3)
18. Great Waltham & Pleshey (1)
19. Highwood & Margaretting (1)
20. Little Baddow (1)
21. Rothmans (2)
22. Stock (1)
23. Woodham Ferrers North (1)
24. Woodham Ferrers South (1)
25. Writtle (3)

Wards from 6 May 1976 to 7 May 1987:

1. All Saints (3)
2. Baddow Road (2)
3. Boreham & Springfield (2)
4. Broomfield & Chignall (2)
5. Cathedral (3)
6. Danbury & Sandon (3)
7. East & West Hanningfield (1)
8. Galleywood (3)
9. Goat Hall (2)
10. Good Easter, Mashbury & Roxwell (1)
11. Great & Little Leighs & Little Waltham (1)
12. Great Baddow Village (2)
13. Great Waltham & Pleshey (1)
14. Highwood & Margaretting (1)
15. Little Baddow (1)
16. Mildmays (2)
17. Moulsham Lodge (2)
18. Oaklands (3)
19. Patching Hall (3)
20. Ramsden Heath & Downham (1)
21. Rettendon & South Hanningfield (1)
22. Rothmans (2)
23. Runwell (2)
24. St Andrews (3)
25. Stock (1)
26. The Lawns (3)
27. Waterhouse Farm (3)
28. Woodham Ferrers North (1)
29. Woodham Ferrers South (2)
30. Writtle (3)

Wards from 7 May 1987 to 1 May 2003:

1. All Saints (2)
2. Baddow Road & Great Baddow Village (3)
3. Boreham (1)
4. Broomfield, Pleshey & Great Waltham (2)
5. Cathedral (2)
6. Chignall, Good Easter, Highwood, Mashbury & Roxwell (1)
7. East & West Hanningfield (1)
8. Galleywood (2)
9. Goat Hall (2)
10. Great & Little Leighs & Little Waltham (1)
11. Little Baddow, Danbury & Sandon (3)
12. Margaretting & Stock (1)
13. Moulsham Lodge (2)
14. Old Moulsham (3)
15. Patching Hall (3)
16. Rettendon & Runwell (2)
17. Rothmans (2)
18. St Andrews (3)
19. South Hanningfield (1)
20. South Woodham—Collingwood East & West (3)
21. South Woodham—Elmwood & Woodville (3)
22. Springfield North (3)
23. Springfield South (3)
24. The Lawns (2)
25. Waterhouse Farm (2)
26. Woodham Ferrers & Bicknacre (1)
27. Writtle (2)

Wards from 1 May 2003 to present:

1. Bicknacre & East & West Hanningfield (2)
2. Boreham & The Leighs (2)
3. Broomfield & The Walthams (3)
4. Chelmer Village & Beaulieu Park (3)
5. Chelmsford Rural West (1)
6. Galleywood (2)
7. Goat Hall (2)
8. Great Baddow East (3)
9. Great Baddow West (2)
10. Little Baddow, Danbury & Sandon (3)
11. Marconi (2)
12. Moulsham & Central (3)
13. Moulsham Lodge (2)
14. Patching Hall (3)
15. Rettendon & Runwell (2)
16. St Andrews (3)
17. South Hanningfield, Stock & Margaretting (2)
18. South Woodham—Chetwood & Collingwood (3)
19. South Woodham—Elmwood & Woodville (3)
20. Springfield North (3)
21. The Lawns (2)
22. Trinity (2)
23. Waterhouse Farm (2)
24. Writtle (2)

=== Colchester ===
Wards from 1 April 1974 (first election 7 June 1973) to 6 May 1976:

1. No. 1 (Colchester: Berechurch) (4)
2. No. 2 (Colchester: Castle) (3)
3. No. 3 (Colchester: Harbour) (3)
4. No. 4 (Colchester: Lexden) (5)
5. No. 5 (Colchester: Mile End) (3)
6. No. 6 (Colchester: New Town) (3)
7. No. 7 (Colchester: St Johns) (8)
8. No. 8 (Colchester: St Marys) (4)
9. No. 9 (Colchester: Shrub End) (4)
10. No. 23 (Tiptree: Church) (1)
11. No. 24 (Tiptree: Heath) (1)
12. No. 25 (Tiptree: Maypole) (1)
13. Birch-Messing (1)
14. Boxted & Langham (1)
15. Copford & Eight Ash Green (1)
16. Dedham (1)
17. East Donyland (1)
18. Fordham (1)
19. Great & Little Horkesley (1)
20. Great Tey (1)
21. Marks Tey (2)
22. Pyefleet (1)
23. Stanway (2)
24. West Bergholt (1)
25. West Mersea (3)
26. Winstree (1)
27. Wivenhoe (3)

Wards from 6 May 1976 to 3 May 1990:

1. Berechurch (3)
2. Birch-Messing (1)
3. Boxted & Langham (1)
4. Castle (3)
5. Copford & Eight Ash Green (1)
6. Dedham (1)
7. East Donyland (1)
8. Fordham (1)
9. Great & Little Horkesley (1)
10. Great Tey (1)
11. Harbour (3)
12. Lexden (3)
13. Marks Tey (1)
14. Mile End (3)
15. New Town (3)
16. Prettygate (3)
17. Pyefleet (1)
18. Shrub End (3)
19. St Andrews (3)
20. St Annes (3)
21. St Johns (3)
22. St Marys (3)
23. Stanway (3)
24. Tiptree (3)
25. West Bergholt (1)
26. West Mersea (3)
27. Winstree (1)
28. Wivenhoe (3)

Wards from 3 May 1990 to 2 May 2002:

1. Berechurch (3)
2. Birch/Messing & Copford (1)
3. Boxted & Langham (1)
4. Castle (3)
5. Dedham (1)
6. East Donyland (1)
7. Fordham (1)
8. Great & Little Horkesley (1)
9. Great Tey (1)
10. Harbour (3)
11. Lexden (3)
12. Marks Tey (1)
13. Mile End (3)
14. New Town (3)
15. Prettygate (3)
16. Pyefleet (1)
17. St Andrew's (3)
18. St Anne's (3)
19. St John's (3)
20. St Mary's (3)
21. Shrub End (3)
22. Stanway (3)
23. Tiptree (3)
24. West Bergholt & Eight Ash Green (2)
25. West Mersea (3)
26. Winstree (1)
27. Wivenhoe (3)

Wards from 2 May 2002 to 5 May 2016:

1. Berechurch (3)
2. Birch & Winstree (2)
3. Castle (3)
4. Christ Church (2)
5. Copford & West Stanway (1)
6. Dedham & Langham (1)
7. East Donyland (1)
8. Fordham & Stour (2)
9. Great Tey (1)
10. Harbour (2); renamed Old Heath in 2012
11. Highwoods (3)
12. Lexden (2)
13. Marks Tey (1)
14. Mile End (3)
15. New Town (3)
16. Prettygate (3)
17. Pyefleet (1)
18. St Andrew's (3)
19. St Anne's (3)
20. St John's (2)
21. Shrub End (3)
22. Stanway (3)
23. Tiptree (3)
24. West Bergholt & Eight Ash Green (2)
25. West Mersea (3)
26. Wivenhoe Cross (2)
27. Wivenhoe Quay (2)

Wards from 5 May 2016 to present:

1. Berechurch (3)
2. Castle (3)
3. Greenstead (3)
4. Highwoods (3)
5. Lexden & Braiswick (3)
6. Marks Tey & Layer (3)
7. Mersea & Pyefleet (3)
8. Mile End (3)
9. New Town & Christ Church (3)
10. Old Heath & The Hythe (3)
11. Prettygate (3)
12. Rural North (3)
13. Shrub End (3)
14. St Anne's & St John's (3)
15. Stanway (3)
16. Tiptree (3)
17. Wivenhoe (3)

=== Epping Forest ===
Wards from 1 April 1974 (first election 7 June 1973) to 3 May 1979:

1. No. 1 (Buckhurst Hill) (7)
2. No. 2 (Chigwell) (6)
3. No. 3 (Loughton North) (8)
4. No. 4 (Loughton South) (8)
5. No. 5 (Epping) (6)
6. No. 8 (Waltham Abbey) (5)
7. No. 13 (Passingford) (1)
8. No. 14 (Lambourne) (1)
9. No. 15 (Theydon Bois) (2)
10. No. 18 (Epping Upland) (1)
11. No. 22 (Hastingwood & Thornwood) (1)
12. No. 23 (North Weald Village) (1)
13. Chipping Ongar (1)
14. Greensted & Marden Ash (1)
15. High Beech (1)
16. High Ongar (1)
17. Moreton & Matching (1)
18. Nazeing (2)
19. Paternoster (1)
20. Roothing Country (1)
21. Roydon (1)
22. Sheering (1)
23. Shelley (1)

Wards from 3 May 1979 to 2 May 2002:

Wards from 2 May 2002 to 2 May 2024:

1. Broadley Common, Epping Upland & Nazeing (1)
2. Buckhurst Hill East (2)
3. Buckhurst Hill West (3)
4. Chigwell Row (1)
5. Chigwell Village (2)
6. Chipping Ongar, Greensted & Marden Ash (2)
7. Epping Hemnall (3)
8. Epping Lindsey & Thornwood Common (3)
9. Grange Hill (3)
10. Hastingwood, Matching & Sheering Village (1) †
11. High Ongar, Willingale & The Rodings (1)
12. Lambourne (1)
13. Loughton Alderton (2)
14. Loughton Broadway (2)
15. Loughton Fairmead (2)
16. Loughton Forest (2)
17. Loughton Roding (2)
18. Loughton St John's (2)
19. Loughton St Mary's (2)
20. Lower Nazeing (2)
21. Lower Sheering (1)
22. Moreton & Fyfield (1) †
23. North Weald Bassett (2)
24. Passingford (1)
25. Roydon (1)
26. Shelley (1)
27. Theydon Bois (2)
28. Waltham Abbey High Beach (1)
29. Waltham Abbey Honey Lane (3)
30. Waltham Abbey North East (2)
31. Waltham Abbey Paternoster (2)
32. Waltham Abbey South West (2)

† minor boundary changes in 2012

Wards from 2 May 2024 to present:

1. Buckhurst Hill East & Whitebridge (3)
2. Buckhurst Hill West (3)
3. Chigwell with Lambourne (3)
4. Epping East (3)
5. Epping West & Rural (3)
6. Grange Hill (3)
7. Loughton Fairmead (3)
8. Loughton Forest (3)
9. Loughton Roding (3)
10. Loughton St John’s (3)
11. North Weald Bassett (3)
12. Ongar (3)
13. Roydon & Lower Nazeing (3)
14. Rural East (3)
15. Theydon Bois with Passingford (3)
16. Waltham Abbey North (3)
17. Waltham Abbey South & Rural (3)
18. Waltham Abbey West (3)

=== Harlow ===
Wards from 1 April 1974 (first election 7 June 1973) to 6 May 1976:

1. Brays Grove (3)
2. Great Parndon (2)
3. Hare Street & Town Centre (3)
4. Kingsmoor (2)
5. Latton Bush (3)
6. Little Parndon (3)
7. Mark Hall North (2)
8. Mark Hall South (4)
9. Netteswell (5)
10. Old Harlow (3)
11. Passmores (3)
12. Potter Street (3)
13. Stewards (3)
14. Tye Green (3)

Wards from 6 May 1976 to 2 May 2002:

1. Brays Grove (3)
2. Great Parndon (2)
3. Hare Street & Town Centre (2)
4. Katherines with Sumners (2)
5. Kingsmoor (3)
6. Latton Bush (3)
7. Little Parndon (3)
8. Mark Hall North (2)
9. Mark Hall South (3)
10. Netteswell East (2)
11. Netteswell West (2)
12. Old Harlow (3)
13. Passmores (3)
14. Potter Street (3)
15. Stewards (3)
16. Tye Green (3)

Wards from 2 May 2002 to 2 May 2024:

1. Bush Fair (3)
2. Church Langley (3)
3. Great Parndon (3)
4. Harlow Common (3)
5. Little Parndon & Hare Street (3)
6. Mark Hall (3)
7. Netteswell (3)
8. Old Harlow (3)
9. Staple Tye (3)
10. Sumners & Kingsmoor (3)
11. Toddbrook (3)

Wards from 2 May 2024 to present:

1. Bush Fair (3)
2. Church Langley North & Newhall (3)
3. Church Langley South & Potter Street (3)
4. Great Parndon (3)
5. Latton Bush & Stewards (3)
6. Little Parndon & Town Centre (3)
7. Mark Hall (3)
8. Netteswell (3)
9. Old Harlow (3)
10. Passmores (3)
11. Sumners & Kingsmoor (3)

=== Maldon ===
Wards from 1 April 1974 (first election 7 June 1973) to 3 May 1979:

1. No. 1 (Maldon) (7)
2. No. 2 (Heybridge) (3)
3. No. 3 (Burnham-on-Crouch) (4)
4. No. 7 (Althorne & Mayland) (1)
5. No. 8 (Latchingdon) (1)
6. Cold Norton (1)
7. Goldhanger (1)
8. Great Totham (2)
9. Purleigh (1)
10. Southminster (2)
11. St Lawrence (1)
12. Tillingham & Bradwell (1)
13. Tollesbury (2)
14. Tolleshunt D'Arcy (1)
15. Wickham Bishops (1)
16. Woodham (1)

Wards from 3 May 1979 to 1 May 2003:

Wards from 1 May 2003 to present:

1. Althorne (2)
2. Burnham-on-Crouch North (2)
3. Burnham-on-Crouch South (2)
4. Great Totham (2)
5. Heybridge East (2)
6. Heybridge West (2)
7. Maldon East (1)
8. Maldon North (2)
9. Maldon South (2)
10. Maldon West (2)
11. Mayland (2)
12. Purleigh (2)
13. Southminster (2)
14. Tillingham (1)
15. Tollesbury (1)
16. Tolleshunt D'Arcy (2)
17. Wickham Bishops & Woodham (2)

=== Rochford ===
Wards from 1 April 1974 (first election 7 June 1973) to 6 May 1976:

1. Ashingdon (2)
2. Barling & Sutton (1)
3. Canewdon (1)
4. Downhall (2)
5. Foulness & Great Wakering East (1)
6. Grange & Rawreth (3)
7. Great Wakering Central (1)
8. Great Wakering West (1)
9. Hawkwell East (3)
10. Hawkwell West (2)
11. Hockley Central (1)
12. Hockley East (2)
13. Hockley West (1)
14. Hullbridge Riverside (2)
15. Hullbridge South (2)
16. Lodge (2)
17. Rayleigh Central (2)
18. Rochford Eastwood (1)
19. Rochford Roche (1)
20. Rochford St Andrews (2)
21. Trinity (3)
22. Wheatley (2)
23. Whitehouse (2)

Wards from 6 May 1976 to 2 May 2002:

1. Ashingdon (2
2. Barling & Sutton (1)
3. Canewdon (1)
4. Downhall (2)
5. Foulness & Great Wakering East (1)
6. Grange & Rawreth (3)
7. Great Wakering Central (1)
8. Great Wakering West (1)
9. Hawkwell East (3)
10. Hawkwell West (2)
11. Hockley Central (1)
12. Hockley East (2)
13. Hockley West (1)
14. Hullbridge Riverside (2)
15. Hullbridge South (2)
16. Lodge (3)
17. Rayleigh Central (2)
18. Rochford Eastwood (1)
19. Rochford Roche (1)
20. Rochford St Andrews (2)
21. Trinity (2)
22. Wheatley (2)
23. Whitehouse (2)

Wards from 2 May 2002 to 5 May 2016:

1. Ashingdon & Canewdon (2)
2. Barling & Sutton (1)
3. Downhall & Rawreth (2)
4. Foulness & Great Wakering (3)
5. Grange (2)
6. Hawkwell North (2)
7. Hawkwell South (2)
8. Hawkwell West (2)
9. Hockley Central (3)
10. Hockley North (1)
11. Hockley West (1)
12. Hullbridge (3)
13. Lodge (2)
14. Rayleigh Central (2)
15. Rochford (3)
16. Sweyne Park (2)
17. Trinity (2)
18. Wheatley (2)
19. Whitehouse (2)

Wards from 5 May 2016 to present:

1. Downhall & Rawreth (3)
2. Foulness & The Wakerings (3)
3. Hawkwell East (3)
4. Hawkwell West (3)
5. Hockley (3)
6. Hockley & Ashingdon (3)
7. Hullbridge (3)
8. Lodge (3)
9. Roche North & Rural (3)
10. Roche South (3)
11. Sweyne Park & Grange (3)
12. Trinity (3)
13. Wheatley (3)

=== Tendring ===
Wards from 1 April 1974 (first election 7 June 1973) to 6 May 1976:

1. No. 1 (Harwich: East) (2)
2. No. 2 (Harwich: East Central) (2)
3. No. 3 (Harwich: West) (2)
4. No. 4 (Harwich: West Central) (2)
5. No. 5 (Brightlingsea) (4)
6. No. 6 (Clacton: Central) (4)
7. No. 7 (Clacton: East) (4)
8. No. 8 (Clacton: Jaywick) (2)
9. No. 9 (Clacton: North) (7)
10. No. 10 (Clacton: West) (6)
11. No. 20 (Elmstead) (1)
12. No. 21 (Alresford & Thorrington) (2)
13. Ardleigh (1)
14. Beaumont & Thorpe (1)
15. Bradfield Wrabness & Wix (1)
16. Frinton (3)
17. Great & Little Oakley (1)
18. Great Bentley (1)
19. Great Bromley Little Bromley Etc. (1)
20. Holland & Kirby (2)
21. Lawford & Manningtree (2)
22. Little Clacton (1)
23. Mistley (1)
24. Ramsey & Parkeston (1)
25. St Osyth & Point Clear (2)
26. Tendring & Weeley (1)
27. Walton (3)

Wards from 6 May 1976 to 1 May 2003:

1. Alresford Thorrington Etc. (2)
2. Ardleigh (1)
3. Beaumont & Thorpe (1)
4. Bockings Elm (2)
5. Bradfield Wrabness & Wix (1)
6. Brightlingsea East (2)
7. Brightlingsea West (2)
8. Elmstead (1)
9. Frinton (3)
10. Golf Green (2)
11. Great & Little Oakley (1)
12. Great Bentley (1)
13. Great Bromley Little Bromley Etc. (1)
14. Harwich East (2)
15. Harwich East Central (2)
16. Harwich West (2)
17. Harwich West Central (2)
18. Haven (2)
19. Holland & Kirby (2)
20. Lawford & Manningtree (2)
21. Little Clacton (1)
22. Mistley (1)
23. Ramsey & Parkeston (1)
24. Rush Green (3)
25. Southcliff (3)
26. St Bartholomews (2)
27. St James (3)
28. St Johns (3)
29. St Marys (3)
30. St Osyth & Point Clear (2)
31. Tendring & Weeley (1)
32. Walton (3)

Wards from 1 May 2003 to 2 May 2019:

1. Alresford (1)
2. Alton Park (2)
3. Ardleigh & Little Bromley (1)
4. Beaumont & Thorpe (1)
5. Bockings Elm (2)
6. Bradfield, Wrabness & Wix (1)
7. Brightlingsea (3)
8. Burrsville (1)
9. Frinton (2)
10. Golf Green (2)
11. Great & Little Oakley (1)
12. Great Bentley (1)
13. Hamford (2)
14. Harwich East (1)
15. Harwich East Central (2)
16. Harwich West (2)
17. Harwich West Central (2)
18. Haven (1)
19. Holland & Kirby (2)
20. Homelands (1)
21. Lawford (2)
22. Little Clacton & Weeley (2)
23. Manningtree, Mistley, Little Bentley & Tendring (2)
24. Peter Bruff (2)
25. Pier (2)
26. Ramsey & Parkeston (1)
27. Rush Green (2)
28. St Bartholomews (2)
29. St James (2)
30. St Johns (2)
31. St Marys (2)
32. St Osyth & Point Clear (2)
33. St Pauls (2)
34. Thorrington, Frating, Elmstead & Great Bromley (2)
35. Walton (2)

Wards from 2 May 2019 to present:

1. Alresford & Elmstead (2)
2. Ardleigh & Little Bromley (1)
3. Bluehouse (2)
4. Brightlingsea (3)
5. Burrsville (2)
6. Cann Hall (2)
7. Coppins (2)
8. Dovercourt All Saints (2)
9. Dovercourt Bay (1)
10. Dovercourt Tollgate (1)
11. Dovercourt Vines & Parkeston (1)
12. Eastcliff (1)
13. Frinton (2)
14. Harwich & Kingsway (1)
15. Homelands (1)
16. Kirby Cross (1)
17. Kirby-le-Soken & Hamford (1)
18. Lawford, Manningtree & Mistley (3)
19. Little Clacton (1)
20. Pier (1)
21. St Bartholomew's (2)
22. St James (2)
23. St John's (2)
24. St Osyth (2)
25. St Paul's (1)
26. Stour Valley (1)
27. The Bentleys & Frating (1)
28. The Oakleys & Wix (1)
29. Thorpe, Beaumont & Great Holland (1)
30. Walton (1)
31. Weeley & Tendring (1)
32. West Clacton & Jaywick Sands (2)

=== Uttlesford ===
Wards from 1 April 1974 (first election 7 June 1973) to 6 May 1976:

1. No. 1 (Saffron Walden) (8)
2. No. 4 (Great Dunmow) (4)
3. No. 21 (Stort Valley)
4. Ashdon (1)
5. Birchanger (1)
6. Clavering (1)
7. Elsenham (1)
8. Felsted (2)
9. Great Hallingbury (1)
10. Hatfield Broad Oak (1)
11. Hatfield Heath (1)
12. Henham (1)
13. Little Hallingbury (1)
14. Littlebury (1)
15. Newport (1)
16. Rickling (1)
17. Stansted Mountfitchet (3)
18. Stebbing (1)
19. Takeley (2)
20. Thaxted (2)
21. The Canfields (1)
22. The Chesterfords (1)
23. The Eastons (1)
24. The Rodings (1)
25. The Sampfords (1)
26. Wenden Lofts (1)
27. Wimbish & Debden (1)

Wards from 6 May 1976 to 1 May 2003:

1. Ashdon (1)
2. Birchanger (1)
3. Clavering (1)
4. Elsenham (1)
5. Felsted (2)
6. Great Dunmow (North) (2)
7. Great Dunmow (South) (2)
8. Great Hallingbury (1)
9. Hatfield Broad Oak (1)
10. Hatfield Heath (1)
11. Henham (1)
12. Little Hallingbury (1)
13. Littlebury (1)
14. Newport (1)
15. Rickling (1)
16. Saffron Walden (Audley) (2)
17. Saffron Walden (Castle) (2)
18. Saffron Walden (Plantation) (2)
19. Saffron Walden (Shire) (2)
20. Stansted Mountfitchet (3)
21. Stebbing (1)
22. Stort Valley (1)
23. Takeley (2)
24. Thaxted (2)
25. The Canfields (1)
26. The Chesterfords (1)
27. The Eastons (1)
28. The Rodings (1)
29. The Sampfords (1)
30. Wenden Lofts (1)
31. Wimbish & Debden (1)

Wards from 1 May 2003 to 7 May 2015:

1. Ashdon (1)
2. Barnston & High Easter (1)
3. Birchanger (1) †
4. Broad Oak & the Hallingburys (2) †
5. Clavering (1)
6. Elsenham & Henham (2)
7. Felsted (2)
8. Great Dunmow North (2)
9. Great Dunmow South (3)
10. Hatfield Heath (1)
11. Littlebury (1)
12. Newport (2)
13. Saffron Walden Audley (3)
14. Saffron Walden Castle (3) †
15. Saffron Walden Shire (3)
16. Stansted North (2)
17. Stansted South (2) †
18. Stebbing (1)
19. Stort Valley (1)
20. Takeley & the Canfields (2) †
21. Thaxted (2)
22. The Chesterfords (1) †
23. The Eastons (1)
24. The Rodings (1)
25. The Sampfords (1)
26. Wenden Lofts (1)
27. Wimbish & Debden (1)

† minor boundary changes in 2011

Wards from 7 May 2015 to present:

1. Ashdon (1)
2. Broad Oak & the Hallingburys (2)
3. Clavering (1)
4. Debden & Wimbish (1)
5. Elsenham & Henham (2)
6. Felsted & Stebbing (2)
7. Flitch Green & Little Dunmow (1)
8. Great Dunmow North (2)
9. Great Dunmow South & Barnston (3)
10. Hatfield Heath (1)
11. High Easter & the Rodings (1)
12. Littlebury, Chesterford & Wenden Lofts (2)
13. Newport (2)
14. Saffron Walden Audley (2)
15. Saffron Walden Castle (2)
16. Saffron Walden Shire (3)
17. Stansted North (2)
18. Stansted South & Birchanger (2)
19. Stort Valley (1)
20. Takeley (3)
21. Thaxted & the Eastons (2)
22. The Sampfords (1)

== Electoral wards by constituency ==
Wards as they existed on 1 December 2020.

=== Basildon and Billericay ===
Basildon: Billericay East; Billericay West; Burstead; Crouch; Fryerns; Laindon Park; Lee Chapel North; St. Martin’s; Vange.

=== Braintree ===
Braintree: Bocking Blackwater; Bocking North; Bocking South; Braintree Central & Beckers Green; Braintree South; Braintree West; Bumpstead; Gosfield & Greenstead Green; Great Notley & Black Notley; Halstead St. Andrew’s; Halstead Trinity; Hedingham; Rayne; Stour Valley North; Stour Valley South; Three Fields; Yeldham.

Uttlesford: Felsted & Stebbing; The Sampfords.

=== Brentwood and Ongar ===
Brentwood: Brentwood North; Brentwood South; Brentwood West; Brizes & Doddinghurst; Herongate, Ingrave & West Horndon; Hutton Central; Hutton East; Hutton North; Hutton South; Ingatestone, Fryerning & Mountnessing; Pilgrims Hatch; Shenfield; South Weald; Tipps Cross; Warley.

Epping Forest: Chipping Ongar, Greensted & Marden Ash; High Ongar, Willingale & The Rodings; Lambourne; Moreton & Fyfield; North Weald Bassett; Passingford; Shelley.

=== Castle Point ===
Basildon: Pitsea South East (polling district DN).

Castle Point: Appleton; Boyce; Canvey Island Central; Canvey Island East; Canvey Island North; Canvey Island South; Canvey Island West; Canvey Island Winter Gardens; Cedar Hall; St George's ; St James; St Mary's; St Peter's; Victoria.

=== Chelmsford ===
Chelsmford: Chelmer Village & Beaulieu Park; Goat Hall; Great Baddow East; Great Baddow West; Marconi; Moulsham & Central; Moulsham Lodge; Patching Hall; St. Andrews; Springfield North; The Lawns; Trinity; Waterhouse Farm.

=== Clacton ===
Tendring: Bluehouse; Burrsville; Cann Hall; Coppins; Eastcliff; Frinton; Homelands; Kirby Cross; Kirby-le-Soken & Hamford; Little Clacton; Pier; St. Bartholomew’s; St. James; St. John’s; St. Osyth; St. Paul’s; The Bentleys & Frating; The Oakleys & Wix; Thorpe, Beaumont & Great Holland; Walton; Weeley & Tendring; West Clacton & Jaywick Sands.

=== Colchester ===
Colchester: Berechurch; Castle; Greenstead; Highwoods, Lexden & Braiswick (polling districts AQ, AS & AT); Mile End; New Town & Christ Church; Prettygate; St. Anne’s & St. John’s; Shrub End.

=== Epping Forest ===
Epping Forest: Broadley Common, Epping Upland & Nazeing; Buckhurst Hill East; Buckhurst Hill West; Chigwell Row; Chigwell Village; Epping Hemnall; Epping Lindsey & Thornwood Common; Grange Hill; Loughton Alderton; Loughton Broadway; Loughton Fairmead; Loughton Forest; Loughton Roding; Loughton St. John’s; Loughton St. Mary’s; Theydon Bois; Waltham Abbey High Beach; Waltham Abbey Honey Lane; Waltham Abbey North East; Waltham Abbey Paternoster; Waltham Abbey South West.

=== Harlow ===
Epping Forest: Hastingwood, Matching & Sheering Village; Lower Nazeing; Lower Sheering; Roydon.

Harlow: Bush Fair; Church Langley; Great Parndon; Harlow Common; Little Parndon & Hare Street; Mark Hall; Netteswell; Old Harlow; Staple Tye; Sumners & Kingsmoor; Toddbrook.

Uttlesford: Broad Oak & the Hallingburys; Hatfield Heath.

=== Harwich and North Essex ===
Colchester: Lexden & Braiswick (polling districts EJ, ET & EU); Mersea & Pyefleet; Old Heath & The Hythe; Rural North; Wivenhoe.

Tendring: Alresford & Elmstead; Ardleigh & Little Bromley; Brightlingsea; Dovercourt All Saints; Dovercourt Bay; Dovercourt Tollgate; Dovercourt Vines & Parkeston; Harwich & Kingsway; Lawford, Manningtree & Mistley; Stour Valley.

=== Maldon ===
Chelmsford: Bicknacre and East & West Hanningfield; Galleywood; Little Baddow, Danbury & Sandon; Rettendon & Runwell; South Hanningfield, Stock & Margaretting; South Woodham–Chetwood and Collingwood; South Woodham–Elmwood and Woodville.

Maldon: Althorne; Burnham-on-Crouch North; Burnham-on-Crouch South; Heybridge East; Heybridge West; Maldon East; Maldon North; Maldon South; Maldon West; Mayland; Purleigh; Southminster; Tillingham.

=== North West Essex ===
Chelmsford: Boreham & The Leighs; Broomfield & The Walthams; Chelmsford Rural West; Writtle.

Uttlesford: Ashdon; Clavering; Debden & Wimbish; Elsenham & Henham; Flitch Green & Little Dunmow; Great Dunmow North; Great Dunmow South & Barnston; High Easter & the Rodings; Littlebury, Chesterford & Wenden Lofts; Newport; Saffron Walden Audley; Saffron Walden Castle; Saffron Walden Shire; Stansted North; Stansted South & Birchanger; Stort Valley; Takeley; Thaxted & the Eastons.

=== Rayleigh and Wickford ===
Basildon: Wickford Castledon; Wickford North; Wickford Park.

Rochford: Downhall & Rawreth; Hawkwell East; Hawkwell West; Hockley; Hockley & Ashingdon; Hullbridge; Lodge; Sweyne Park & Grange; Trinity; Wheatley.

=== South Basildon and East Thurrock ===
Basildon: Langdon Hills; Nethermayne; Pitsea North West; Pitsea South East (polling districts DO, DP, DQ & DR).

Thurrock: Chadwell St. Mary; Corringham & Fobbing; East Tilbury; Orsett; Stanford East & Corringham Town; Stanford-le-Hope West; The Homesteads.

=== Southend East and Rochford ===
Rochford: Foulness & The Wakerings; Roche North & Rural; Roche South.

Southend-on-Sea: Kursaal; Milton; Shoeburyness; Southchurch; Thorpe; Victoria; West Shoebury.

=== Southend West and Leigh ===
Southend-on-Sea: Belfairs; Blenheim Park; Chalkwell; Eastwood Park; Leigh; Prittlewell; St. Laurence; St. Luke’s; West Leigh; Westborough.

=== Thurrock ===
Thurrock: Aveley & Uplands; Belhus; Chafford & North Stifford; Grays Riverside; Grays Thurrock; Little Thurrock Blackshots; Little Thurrock Rectory; Ockendon; South Chafford; Stifford Clays; Tilbury Riverside & Thurrock Park; Tilbury St. Chads; West Thurrock & South Stifford.

=== Witham ===
Braintree: Coggeshall; Hatfield Peverel & Terling; Kelvedon & Feering; Silver End & Cressing; The Colnes; Witham Central; Witham North; Witham South; Witham West.

Colchester: Marks Tey & Layer; Stanway; Tiptree.

Maldon: Great Totham; Tollesbury; Tollesbury D’arcy; Wickham Bishops & Woodham.

== See also ==
- List of parliamentary constituencies in Essex
