= Ernest Alexander (disambiguation) =

Ernest Alexander (1870–1934) was a VC recipient.

Ernest or Ernie Alexander may also refer to:

- Ernest Alexander (politician) (1872–1946), English politician
- Ernie Alexander, creator of National Bicycle Association
