= Historical list of parliamentary constituencies in Essex =

This is a list of constituencies in the "historical" country of Essex.

== Seats before 1832: 8 seats ==
Constituency	Created	Abolished	Members	Notes
Essex		1832	Two	
Maldon		1983	Two	
Colchester		1983	Two	
Harwich		2010	Two	

== Seats 1832 - 1868: 10 seats ==
Constituency	Created	Abolished	Members	Notes
South Essex	1832	1885	Two	From Essex
North Essex	1832	1868	Two	From Essex
Maldon		1983	Two	
Colchester		1983	Two	
Harwich		2010	Two	

== Seats 1868 - 1885: 12 seats ==
Constituency	Created	Abolished	Members	Notes
South Essex	1832	1885	Two	
East Essex	1868	1885	Two	From North Essex
West Essex	1868	1885	Two	From North Essex
Maldon		1983	Two	
Colchester		1983	Two	
Harwich		2010	Two	

== Seats 1885 - 1918: 13 seats ==
Constituency	Created	Abolished	Members	Notes
Chelmsford	1885	1918	One	From East Essex, South Essex and West Essex
Epping	1885	1918	One	From South Essex
Saffron Walden	1885	1918	One	From West Essex
Walthamstow	1885	1918	One	From South Essex
Romford	1885	1918	One	From South Essex
South East Essex	1885	1945	One	From South Essex
Maldon		1983	One	Received parts of abolished East Essex
Colchester		1983	One	Received parts of abolished East Essex
Harwich		2010	One	Received parts of abolished East Essex

== See also ==
- List of former parliamentary constituencies in Essex
- List of parliamentary constituencies in Essex
