= Mills baronets of Ebbw Vale (1921) =

Baronetcy in the Baronetage of the United Kingdom

Mills baronets
- Escutcheon of the Mills baronets of Ebbw Vale
- Creation date: 1921
- Status: extant

The Mills Baronetcy, of Ebbw Vale in the County of Monmouth, was created in the Baronetage of the United Kingdom in 1921 for the industrialist and Conservative Member of Parliament Frederick Mills. The second Baronet was Director of Public Works of Sierra Leone between 1939 and 1942 and of Uganda between 1942 and 1947.

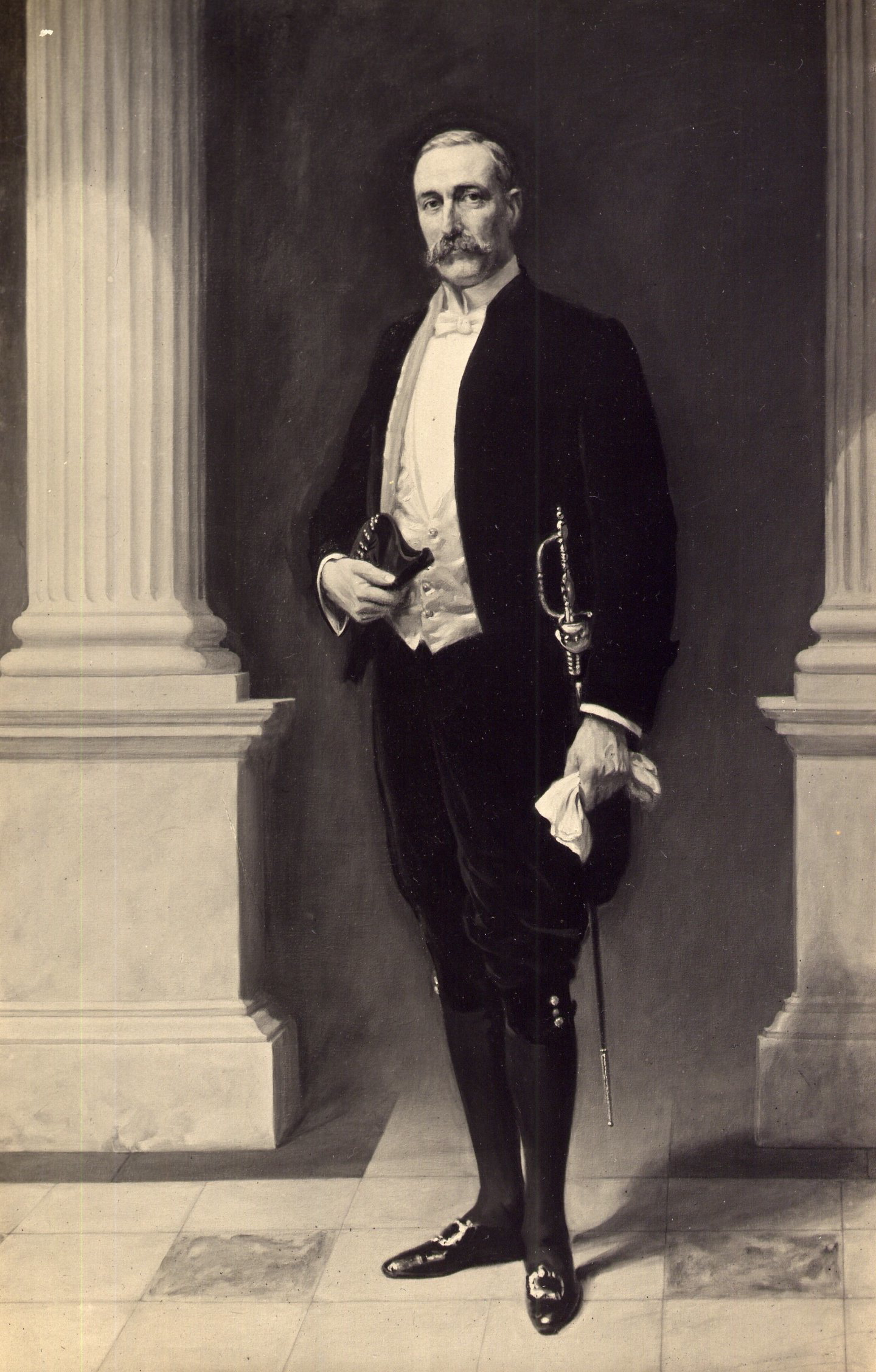
Sir Frederick Mills, 1st Baronet, by Christopher Williams (1914)

== Mills baronets, of Ebbw Vale (1921) ==
- Sir Frederick Mills, 1st Baronet (1865–1953)
- Sir Frederick Leighton Victor Mills, 2nd Baronet (1893–1955)
- Sir Peter Frederick Leighton Mills, 3rd Baronet (1924–2021)
- Sir Michael Victor Leighton Mills, 4th Baronet (born 1957)

There is no heir to the baronetcy.

== See also ==
- Mills baronets
