= Jack Jones (Silvertown MP) =

Irish politician (1873-1941)

John Joseph Jones (8 December 1873 – 21 November 1941), was a Labour Party Member of Parliament (MP).

Born in Nenagh, Co Tipperary, Jones moved to London where he worked as a builders' labourer. He joined the Social Democratic Federation (SDF) and was elected to West Ham Council in 1904.

In the 1906 general election, Jones unsuccessfully stood for Camborne. In 1911, he became a trade union organiser, for the National Union of General Workers.

In the 1914 Poplar by-election, Jones stood unsuccessfully for the British Socialist Party (BSP) - the successor of the SDF.

As a supporter of World War I, he joined the National Socialist Party split from the BSP, which soon affiliated to the Labour Party.

In the Coupon election, he stood against an official Labour candidate in Silvertown - the official candidate being an anti-war supporter of the Independent Labour Party.

He became one of several National Socialist Party candidates elected, but the only one who stood for the party, rather than for the Labour Party. Despite this, he took the Labour Party whip in 1919.

Jones was described by Time Magazine as "the wittiest man in the House of Commons". He held his seat in each election until he resigned in February 1940. He died the following year.

He was a keen football and cricket fan, and his autobiography was entitled My Lively Life.

Parliament of the United Kingdom
New creation	Member of Parliament for Silvertown; 1918–1940	Succeeded by James Hollins
Trade union offices
Preceded by Margaret Bondfield and Samuel Finney	Trades Union Congress representative to the American Federation of Labour; 1920; With: J. W. Ogden	Succeeded by J. H. Thomas and James Walker
Civic offices
Preceded by Walter Godbold	Mayor of West Ham; 1923–1924	Succeeded by Benjamin Gardner
