= Erik Bonino =

British businessman and politician (born 1963)

Erik Bonino (born July 1963) is a British businessman, formerly Chairman of Shell UK.

At the 2024 United Kingdom general election he was an independent candidate in the North West Essex constituency.

== Career ==
Bonino has worked in management consultancy, engineering, major projects, and technology since 1984. In 2002, he joined Shell, headquartered at the Shell Centre. He was Chairman of Shell UK from 2014 to 2017 and is a trustee of EngineeringUK.

In May 2024, Bonino declared himself as an independent candidate for MP of the North West Essex constituency in the July 2024 UK General Election. He got 699 votes or 1.3% of the votes.

== See also ==
- Carl-Henric Svanberg, Chairman of BP
- Peter Mather (businessman), Head of BP UK since 2004
