= James Hollins =

British trade unionist and politician (1877–1954)

James Henry Hollins (1877 – 22 September 1954) was a British trade unionist and politician.

Hollins, a supporter of the Social Democratic Federation, was branch secretary in Silvertown of the National Union of Gasworkers & General Labourers around 1914 and appears to have been an energetic organiser.

In the 1930s, Hollins was an alderman in West Ham and in 1930 he was Mayor. In April 1931 Alderman Hollins was appointed a member of the committee appointed to consider preparations for the prevention of damage by floods in the Thames tidal area.

Hollins came to prominence in 1940 when he was selected as Labour candidate to fill the seat of Silvertown on the resignation of the sitting MP, Jack Jones, who had held the seat since 1918. Hollins was a friend of Jones and had been his election agent. At this stage he had been a councillor for 26 years and an election agent for 20. With the Second World War under way, Labour's candidature was not opposed by the other coalition parties. This was in any case a Labour safe seat. The only opposition came from the Communist Party, who put forward their leader, Harry Pollitt, and the British Union (formerly the British Union of Fascists). Hollins triumphed, winning over 14,000 votes and a majority of 13,377. Both of the other candidates polled so badly that they lost their deposits.

Hollins remained as MP for Silvertown until the next general election, in 1945, which he did not contest.

Parliament of the United Kingdom
Preceded by Jack Jones	Member of Parliament for Silvertown; 1940–1945	Succeeded by Louis Comyns
Civic offices
Preceded by William Thomas Bell	Mayor of West Ham; 1929–1930	Succeeded by Walter Joseph Reed
