= 1940 Silvertown by-election =

UK parliamentary by-election

The Silvertown by-election of 1940 was a wartime by-election.

Silvertown was a safe Labour seat, and none of the major parties stood against the Labour candidate.

It was one of the last by-elections contested by the British Union of Fascists which campaigned on a platform calling for an immediate peace with Nazi Germany, a policy which won them only 151 votes.

By-election, 22 February 1940: Silvertown
Party	Candidate	Votes	%	±%
Labour	James Hollins	14,343	92.8	+11.8
Communist	Harry Pollitt	966	6.2	New
British Union of Fascists	Tommy Moran	151	1.0	New
Majority		13,377	86.6	+24.6
Turnout		15,460		
Labour hold		Swing		
