= Louis Comyns =

Politician and doctor

Louis Comyns (17 August 1904 – 10 February 1962) was a British Labour Party politician and a general practitioner.

Born in Glasgow into a Jewish family, Comyns worked as a doctor from 1932.

Comyns was elected to the House of Commons at the 1945 general election, as Member of Parliament for the Silvertown constituency in the East End of London. He served until the 1950 general election, when the constituency was abolished in boundary changes. He then served on West Ham Borough Council.

Parliament of the United Kingdom
Preceded by James Hollins	Member of Parliament for Silvertown; 1945–1950	Constituency abolished
