= Albert Bechervaise =

British politician

Albert Eric Bechervaise (15 July 1884 – 20 December 1969) was a British politician.

Bechervaise was educated at Mayville Road School in his hometown of Leytonstone, before becoming what he described as a "piano worker". By 1927, he was instead working as a co-operative insurance agent and lecturer. He joined the Labour Party, and served on Leyton Urban District Council from 1924 to 1926, then Leyton Borough Council until 1965, including a term as Mayor of Leyton in 1930.

Bechervaise unsuccessfully stood in Southend at the 1931 United Kingdom general election, and in Leyton East at the 1935 United Kingdom general election, but won the latter seat at the 1945 United Kingdom general election. He stood down in 1950, but served on the Metropolitan Water Board from 1954 until 1960.

Parliament of the United Kingdom
Preceded by Sir Frederick Mills, Bt	Member of Parliament for Leyton East; 1945 – 1950	Succeeded by Constituency abolished
