= Mills baronets =

Baronetcy in the Baronetage of the United Kingdom

There have been three baronetcies created for people with the surname Mills, all in the Baronetage of the United Kingdom. Two of the titles are extant.

- Mills baronets of Hillingdon (1868): see Baron Hillingdon
- Mills baronets of Ebbw Vale (1921)
- Mills baronet of Alcester (1953) see Viscount Mills
