= Peter Mather (businessman) =

British businessman (born 1960)

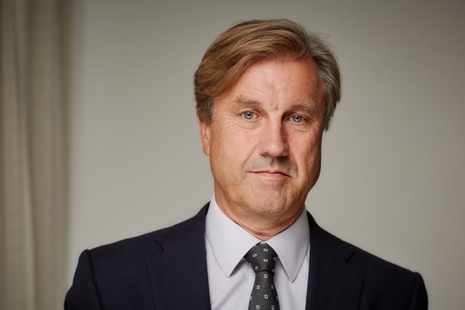
- Born: Bristol, England
- Occupation: Businessman

Peter James Mather (born 21 July 1960) is a British businessman, and the Head of BP in the UK. BP employs around 15,000 people in the UK.

== Early life and education ==
He was born in Bristol and attended an independent school there. His parents were both doctors. He went to New College, Oxford, graduating in 1982. He studied modern languages (French and German) and philosophy. In 1991, he studied at INSEAD in France.

== Career ==
In 1997 he became Managing Director of BP Gas. In January 2004 he became Head of BP in the UK. In April 2010 he became Head of BP in Europe.

He works with Business in the Community.

== Personal life ==
He can speak French, German and Spanish fluently. He speaks some Russian. He is married with three children (with a daughter born December 1997). He married Vivienne Creevey in April 1985 in Oxford. He lives in Richmond Hill, London. His wife published a children's book in French in 2006.

Business positions
Preceded by John Mumford	Head of BP UK; January 2004 -	Succeeded by Incumbent
