= Sir Frederick Mills, 1st Baronet =

British politician and Steel Commission member (1865–1953)

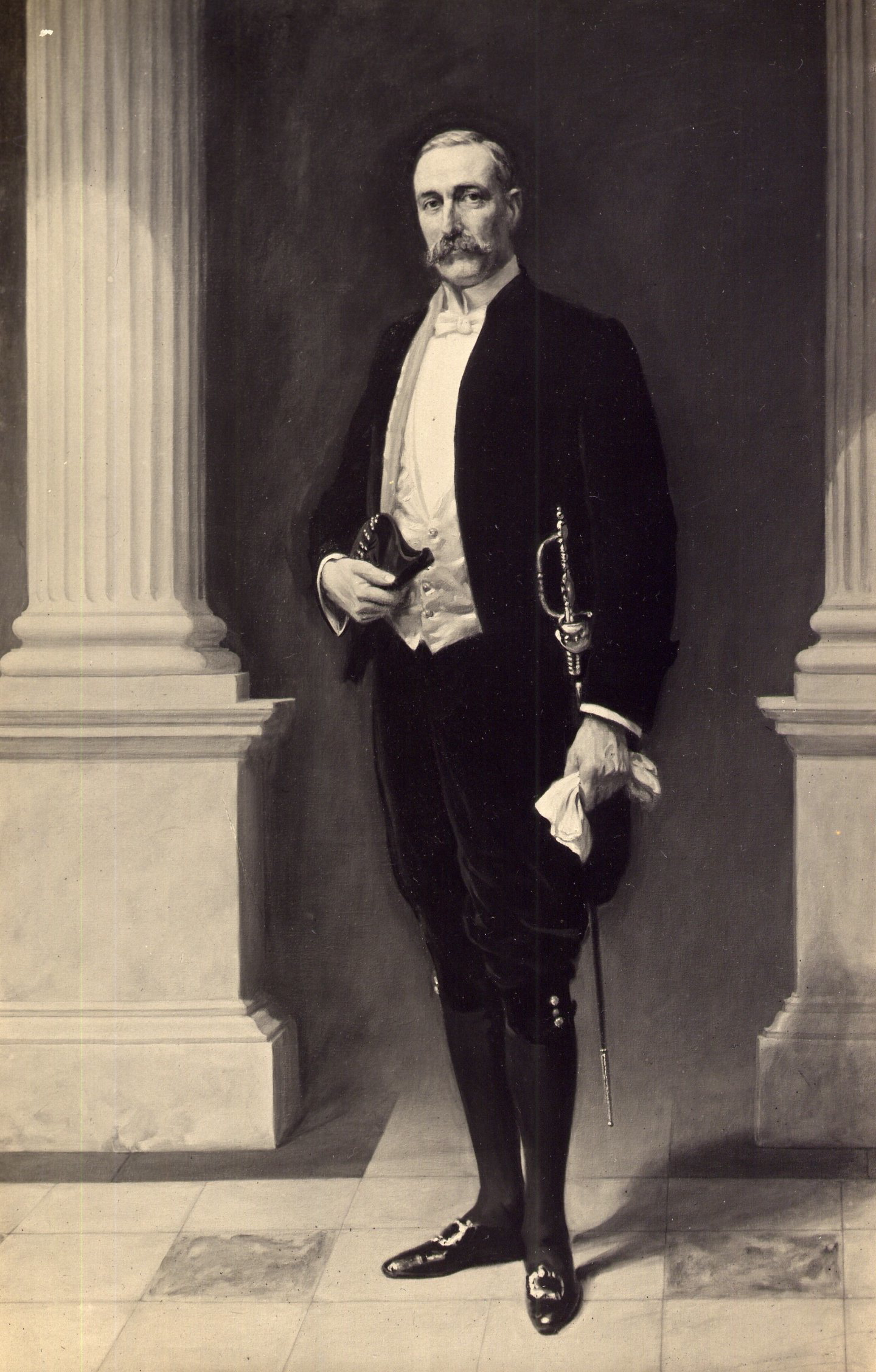
Portrait of Frederick Mills by Christopher Williams (1914)

Sir Frederick Mills, 1st Baronet, DL (23 April 1865 – 22 December 1953) was a British iron and steel manufacturer and Conservative Party politician. He was a member of Parliament (MP) from 1931 to 1945.

Mills was born in Sunderland. He was educated at Dr Robertson's Private Academy and Durham College of Science, both in Newcastle upon Tyne. He was apprenticed at Palmers of Jarrow and then became an official of the South Durham Steel Company at Stockton-on-Tees. In 1896 he was appointed works manager of the Glasgow Iron Company's steelworks at Wishaw and in 1900 he moved to the Ebbw Vale Steel Iron and Coal Company as a departmental manager. By 1910 he was managing director and in November 1919 he became chairman in succession to Sir Charles Allen. During the First World War he not only directed one of the most important steel companies in Britain, but was also largely responsible for raising the Monmouthshire battalions of the South Wales Borderers. During the peace negotiations, he represented British interests on the Steel Commission. For these services, he was created a baronet, of Ebbw Vale in the county of Monmouthshire, in the 1921 New Year Honours.

After the war the world steel market collapsed and throughout the 1920s the Ebbw Vale Steel, Coal and Iron Company struggled to stay afloat. Mills stood down as chairman, but was persuaded to rejoin the board as managing director. He finally retired in 1929.

He was appointed High Sheriff of Monmouthshire for 1912 and was elected at the 1931 general election as MP for Leyton East, defeating the sitting Labour MP Fenner Brockway by nearly 7,000 votes. He held the seat at the 1935 general election, with his majority cut to 329, and represented the constituency until he retired at the 1945 election at the age of eighty.

== Family ==
He married Anne Hamilton, daughter of Reverend James Hamilton.

== Footnotes ==
Parliament of the United Kingdom
| Preceded by Fenner Brockway | Member of Parliament for Leyton East; 1931 – 1945 | Succeeded by Albert Bechervaise |
Baronetage of the United Kingdom
| New creation | Baronet of Ebbw Vale; 1921 – 1953 | Succeeded by Frederick Mills |
