= Silvertown (constituency) =

Parliamentary constituency in the United Kingdom, 1918–1950

- Former borough constituency for the House of Commons
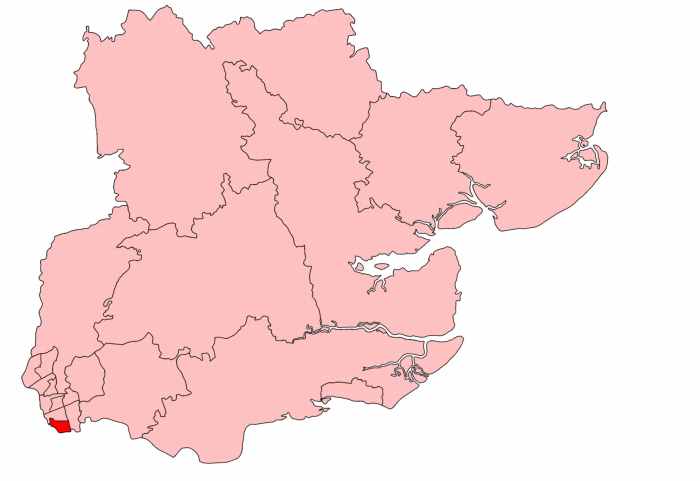
- Silvertown in Essex, showing boundaries used from 1918 to 1950.
- County: Essex

1918–1950
- Seats: One
- Created from: West Ham South
- Replaced by: West Ham South

Silvertown was a borough constituency returning a single Member of Parliament (MP) to the House of Commons of the Parliament of the United Kingdom through the first-past-the-post voting system. The constituency was one of four divisions of the Parliamentary Borough of West Ham, which had at the time the same boundaries as the County Borough of West Ham. Although administratively separate since 1889, the area was formally part of the county of Essex; since 1965 it has been part of the London Borough of Newham in Greater London.

The creation of the constituency was recommended by the Boundary Commission in a report issued in 1917, and formally created by the Representation of the People Act 1918. It came into existence at the 1918 general election. As the borough of West Ham had only 120,586 electors on 15 October 1946, the relevant date for the subsequent Boundary Commission review, the borough was only entitled to two Members of Parliament; North and South divisions were recommended. As a consequence Silvertown was abolished as a separate constituency by the Representation of the People Act 1948 and went out of existence at the 1950 general election.

== Boundaries ==
Silvertown was based on the two wards of Custom House and Silvertown (based either side of the Royal Victoria Dock), and Tidal Basin, which was to its north-west. The large wards in the southern County Borough of West Ham at the time of the 1917 Boundary Commission review made it necessary to split one ward across two constituencies, or else the divisions of West Ham would have had significantly different sizes. The ward which was split was the Canning Town ward, the southern part of which was included in Silvertown: the commissioners drew a line along the centre of the Woolwich branch of the Great Eastern Railway (now the North London Line) from Canning Town station north to join up with Star Lane (near the future Star Lane DLR station), then east along Star Lane, to join up with the ward boundary at Hermit Lane and Beckton Road.

== Members of Parliament ==
Election	Member	Party
1918	Jack Jones	National Socialist
1919	Jack Jones	Labour
1940 by-election	James Hollins	Labour
1945	Louis Comyns	Labour
1950	constituency abolished	

== Election results ==
1918 general election: Silvertown
Party		Candidate	Votes	%	±%
	National Socialist Party	Jack Jones	6,971	51.6	
C	Unionist	Thomas Walter Colby Carthew	4,259	31.5	
	Labour	David John Davis	2,278	16.9	
Majority			2,712	20.1	
Turnout			13,508		
	National Socialist Party win (new seat)				
C indicates candidate endorsed by the coalition government.

1922 general election: Silvertown
Party	Candidate	Votes	%	±%
Labour	Jack Jones	11,874	73.1	+56.2
Unionist	Charles George Lewis	4,361	26.9	−4.6
Majority		7,513	46.2	+26.1
Turnout		16,235		
Labour gain from National Socialist Party				

1923 general election: Silvertown
Party	Candidate	Votes	%	±%
Labour	Jack Jones	12,777	81.3	+8.2
Unionist	Charles George Lewis	2,948	18.7	−8.2
Majority		9,829	62.6	+16.4
Turnout		15,725	45.9	
Labour hold		Swing	+8.2	

1924 general election: Silvertown
Party	Candidate	Votes	%	±%
Labour	Jack Jones	15,962	81.1	−0.2
Unionist	Edward Doran	3,732	18.9	+0.2
Majority		12,230	62.2	−0.4
Turnout		19,694		
Labour hold		Swing	+0.2	

1929 general election: Silvertown
Party	Candidate	Votes	%	±%
Labour	Jack Jones	23,451	85.7	+4.6
Unionist	William Teeling	3,903	14.3	−4.6
Majority		19,548	71.4	+9.2
Turnout		27,354		
Labour hold		Swing	+4.6	

1931 general election: Silvertown
Party	Candidate	Votes	%	±%
Labour	Jack Jones	19,851	77.8	−7.9
Conservative	Eleonora Tennant	5,654	22.2	+7.9
Majority		14,197	55.6	−15.8
Turnout		25,505		
Labour hold		Swing	-7.9	

1935 general election: Silvertown
Party	Candidate	Votes	%	±%
Labour	Jack Jones	18,177	81.0	+3.2
Conservative	Eleonora Tennant	4,276	19.0	−3.2
Majority		13,901	62.0	+6.4
Turnout		22,453		
Labour hold		Swing	+3.2	

By-election, 22 February 1940: Silvertown
Party	Candidate	Votes	%	±%
Labour	James Hollins	14,343	92.8	+11.8
Communist	Harry Pollitt	966	6.2	New
British Union	Tommy Moran	151	1.0	New
Majority		13,377	86.6	+24.6
Turnout		15,460		
Labour hold		Swing		

1945 general election: Silvertown
Party	Candidate	Votes	%	±%
Labour	Louis Comyns	9,358	91.3	+10.3
Conservative	Edward Elverston	494	4.8	−14.2
Independent	Arthur William Davies	401	3.9	New
Majority		8,864	86.5	+5.5
Turnout		10,253		
Labour hold		Swing	+12.3	
