= List of former parliamentary constituencies in Essex =

Below is a list of former parliamentary constituencies in Essex and details of them. These details include their modern equivalent, date of existence and any other relevant information.

== Former Seats 1983-1997 ==
=== Colchester North ===
- Modern Equivalent and successor: Colchester and North Essex
- Predecessor: Colchester
- Elections fought: 1983, 1987, 1992
- Type of seat: Conservative safe
- Member(s) of Parliament:
  1. Antony Buck (1983 - 1992), Conservative
  2. Bernard Jenkin (1992 - 1997), Conservative

=== Colchester South and Maldon ===
- Modern Equivalent and successor: Maldon and East Chelmsford
- Predecessor: Maldon
- Elections fought: 1983, 1987, 1992
- Type of seat: Conservative safe
- Member(s) of Parliament: John Wakeham (1983 - 1997), Conservative

=== Rochford ===
- Modern Equivalent and successor: Rayleigh
- Predecessor: South East Essex
- Elections fought: 1983, 1987, 1992
- Type of seat: Conservative safe
- Member(s) of Parliament: Michael Clark (1983 - 1997), Conservative

=== Southend East ===
- Modern Equivalent and successor: Rochford and Southend East
- Elections fought: 1918 to 1992
- Type of seat: Conservative safe
- Member(s) of Parliament: Henry Channon (1983 - 1997), Conservative

== Former Seats 1955-1974 ==
=== Billericay ===
- Modern Equivalent: Billericay and Brentwood and Ongar
- Successor: Brentwood and Ongar
- Elections fought: 1950 to 1970
- Type of seat: Conservative safe (1950s) and marginal (1960s and 1970s)
- Member(s) of Parliament:
  1. Richard Body (1955 - 1959), Conservative
  2. Edward Gardner (1959 - 1966), Conservative
  3. Eric Moonman (1966 - 1970), Labour
  4. Robert McCrindle (1970 - 1974), Conservative

=== Chigwell ===
- Modern Equivalent and successor: Epping Forest
- Elections fought: 1955 to 1970
- Type of seat: Conservative
- Member(s) of Parliament: John Biggs-Davison (1955 - 1974), Conservative

=== Epping ===
- Modern Equivalent and successor: Epping Forest and Harlow
- Elections fought: 1885 to 1970
- Type of seat: Conservative marginal (bellwether constituency)
- Member(s) of Parliament:
  1. Graeme Bell Finlay (1955 - 1964), Conservative
  2. Stanley Newens (1964 - 1970), Labour
  3. Norman Tebbit (1970 - 1974), Conservative
