= Leyton East =

Parliamentary constituency in the United Kingdom, 1918–1950

- Former borough constituency for the House of Commons

1918–1950
- Seats: one
- Created from: Walthamstow
- Replaced by: Leyton

Leyton East was a parliamentary constituency in the Municipal Borough of Leyton, then part of Essex but now in Greater London.

It returned one Member of Parliament (MP) to the House of Commons of the Parliament of the United Kingdom, elected by the first past the post system.

== Boundaries ==
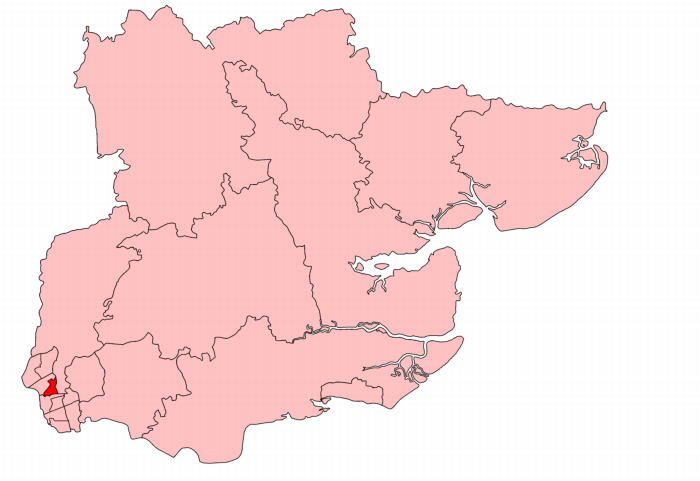
Leyton East in Essex 1918-1950

The Urban District of Leyton wards of Cann Hall, Grove Green, Harrow Green, Leytonstone, and Wanstead Slip.

== History ==
The constituency was created for the 1918 general election, and abolished for the 1950 general election.

== Members of Parliament ==
Election	Member	Party
1918	Cecil Malone	Coalition Liberal
1919	Cecil Malone	British Socialist
1920	Cecil Malone	Communist
1922	Ernest Alexander	Unionist
1923	Archibald Church	Labour
1924	Ernest Alexander	Unionist
1929	Fenner Brockway	Labour
1931	Sir Frederick Mills	Conservative
1945	Albert Bechervaise	Labour
1950	constituency abolished: see Leyton	

== Elections ==
=== Election in the 1910s ===
General election 1918: Leyton East
Party		Candidate	Votes	%
C	National Liberal	Cecil Malone	4,319	35.7
	Unionist	Ernest Alexander	4,119	34.0
	Labour	William Carter	3,668	30.3
Majority			200	1.7
Turnout			12,106	45.3
Registered electors				
	National Liberal win (new seat)			
C indicates candidate endorsed by the coalition government.

=== Elections in the 1920s ===
General election 1922: Leyton East
Party	Candidate	Votes	%	±%
Unionist	Ernest Alexander	7,866	38.6	+4.6
Labour	William Carter	6,300	30.9	+0.6
National Liberal	Walter Gibbons	4,568	22.4	–13.3
Liberal	Edward Brotherton-Ratcliffe	1,650	8.1	New
Majority		1,566	7.7	N/A
Turnout		20,384	72.2	+26.9
Registered electors		28,232		
Unionist gain from National Liberal		Swing	+16.1	

General election 1923: Leyton East
Party	Candidate	Votes	%	±%
Labour	Archibald Church	7,944	39.5	+8.6
Unionist	Ernest Alexander	6,533	32.4	−6.2
Liberal	Thomas Broad	5,669	28.1	+20.0
Majority		1,411	7.1	N/A
Turnout		20,146	69.1	−3.1
Registered electors		29,166		
Labour gain from Unionist		Swing	+7.4	

General election 1924: Leyton East
Party	Candidate	Votes	%	±%
Unionist	Ernest Alexander	10,649	46.4	+14.0
Labour	Archibald Church	9,087	39.7	+0.2
Liberal	R.W. Puddicombe	3,174	13.9	−14.2
Majority		1,562	6.7	N/A
Turnout		22,190	77.6	+8.5
Registered electors		29,506		
Unionist gain from Labour		Swing	+6.9	

General election 1929: Leyton East
Party	Candidate	Votes	%	±%
Labour	Fenner Brockway	11,111	42.9	+3.2
Unionist	Ernest Alexander	8,691	33.6	−12.8
Liberal	Frank Wynne Davies	6,096	23.5	+9.6
Majority		2,420	9.3	N/A
Turnout		25,898	72.6	−5.0
Registered electors		35,680		
Labour gain from Unionist		Swing	+8.0	

=== Elections in the 1930s ===
General election 1931: Leyton East
Party	Candidate	Votes	%	±%
Conservative	Frederick Mills	17,285	62.4	+28.8
Ind. Labour Party	Fenner Brockway	10,433	37.6	New
Majority		6,852	24.8	N/A
Turnout		27,718	75.7	+3.1
Registered electors				
Conservative gain from Labour		Swing		

General election 1935: Leyton East
Party	Candidate	Votes	%	±%
Conservative	Frederick Mills	10,836	46.1	−16.3
Labour	Albert Bechervaise	10,507	44.7	New
Liberal	Edwin Malindine	2,161	9.2	New
Majority		329	1.4	−23.4
Turnout		23,504	67.1	−8.6
Registered electors				
Conservative hold		Swing		

=== Elections in the 1940s ===
General election 1945: Leyton East
Party	Candidate	Votes	%	±%
Labour	Albert Bechervaise	13,048	65.7	+21.0
Conservative	Bernard Braine	6,802	34.3	−11.8
Majority		6,246	31.4	N/A
Turnout		19,850	68.2	+1.1
Registered electors				
Labour gain from Conservative		Swing		
