= Ernest Alexander (politician) =

Ernest Edward Alexander (1872–1946) was Conservative MP for Leyton East.

He first contested the seat in 1918, won it in 1922, lost it to Labour in 1923, won it back in 1924, and lost it to Labour again in 1929.

== Sources ==
- Craig, F.W.S. (1983) [1969]. British parliamentary election results 1918-1949 (3rd ed.). Chichester: Parliamentary Research Services. ISBN 0-900178-06-X.
- Whitaker's Almanack, 1919 to 1931 editions
- Leigh Rayment's Historical List of MPs^{[usurped]}
