= North West Essex =

UK Parliament constituency (since 2024)

Coordinates: 51.89°N 0.34°E

- County constituency for the House of Commons
- Interactive map of boundaries since 2024
- Location within the East of England
- County: Essex
- Electorate: 76,280 (March 2020)
- Major settlements: Saffron Walden

Current constituency
- Created: 2024
- Member of Parliament: Kemi Badenoch (Conservative)
- Seats: One
- Created from: Saffron Walden

North West Essex is a constituency of the House of Commons in the UK Parliament. Further to the completion of the 2023 review of Westminster constituencies, it was first contested at the 2024 general election; it has since been held by Kemi Badenoch of the Conservative Party, the current leader of the opposition. She was MP for the predecessor seat of Saffron Walden from 2017 to 2024.

== Constituency profile ==
North West Essex is a constituency in Essex in the East of England, covering parts of the Uttlesford and City of Chelmsford local government districts. Its largest town is Saffron Walden, which has a population of around 17,000. Other settlements include the towns of Great Dunmow and Thaxted and the villages of Stansted Mountfitchet, Newport, Elsenham, Takeley, Great Leighs, Broomfield, Writtle and Boreham.

This is a large, rural constituency with many small villages. The constituency's towns are historic market towns; Saffron Walden is known for its production of saffron, after which the town was named. Broomfield, Writtle and Boreham are suburban villages located on the outskirts of Chelmsford. The constituency contains London Stansted Airport, the UK's fourth-busiest airport and a significant local employer. North West Essex is generally affluent with low levels of deprivation, especially in Saffron Walden, and house prices are considerably higher than regional and national averages.

The constituency has above-average proportions of middle-aged adults and retirees and a low proportion of young adults. Residents have high rates of income and homeownership, and the child poverty rate is less than half the UK-wide figure. Residents are generally well-educated and a high proportion work in the transport and health sectors. The percentage of residents claiming unemployment benefits is low. White people made up 93% of the population at the 2021 census.

At the local district council level, most of the constituency is represented by localists with some Liberal Democrats elected in Stansted Mountfitchet and Conservatives elected in Great Dunmow and the villages to its south. At the county council, which held elections in 2026, most of the constituency is represented by Reform UK councillors. Labour currently have no local council or County Council representation in the seat, but the party achieved a considerable swing of 21.6% in its favour at the 2024 General Election, reducing the previous notional Conservative majority of over 23,000 to just over 2,000.

An estimated 51% of voters in North West Essex supported leaving the European Union in the 2016 referendum, similar to the UK-wide figure of 52%.

== Boundaries ==
The constituency is composed of the following (as they existed on 1 December 2020):

- The City of Chelmsford wards of: Boreham and The Leighs; Broomfield and The Walthams; Chelmsford Rural West; Writtle.
- The District of Uttlesford wards of: Ashdon; Clavering; Debden & Wimbish; Elsenham & Henham; Flitch Green & Little Dunmow; Great Dunmow North; Great Dunmow South & Barnston; High Easter & the Rodings; Littlebury, Chesterford & Wenden Lofts; Newport; Saffron Walden Audley; Saffron Walden Castle; Saffron Walden Shire; Stansted North; Stansted South & Birchanger; Stort Valley; Takeley; Thaxted & the Eastons.

It is the successor to Saffron Walden, excluding minor transfers to Braintree and Harlow (two District of Uttlesford wards each).

== Members of Parliament ==
Saffron Walden prior to 2024

Election	Member	Party
2024	Kemi Badenoch	Conservative

== Elections ==
=== Elections in the 2020s ===
General election 2024: North West Essex
Party	Candidate	Votes	%	±%
Conservative	Kemi Badenoch	19,360	35.6	−26.1
Labour	Issy Waite	16,750	30.8	+17.0
Reform	Grant StClair-Armstrong (Note: StClair-Armstrong resigned from Reform UK on 16 June 2024. As nominations had already closed, he was still identified as the Reform UK candidate on the ballot paper.)	7,668	14.1	N/A
Liberal Democrats	Smita Rajesh	6,055	11.1	−8.6
Green	Edward Gildea	2,846	5.2	+0.4
Independent	Andrew Green	852	1.6	N/A
Independent	Erik Bonino	699	1.3	N/A
Independent	Niko Omilana	156	0.3	N/A
Majority		2,610	4.8	−37.2
Turnout		54,386	68.5	−4.0
Registered electors		79,824		
Conservative hold		Swing	−21.6	

=== Elections in the 2010s ===
2019 notional result
Party	Vote	%
Conservative	34,105	61.7
Liberal Democrats	10,878	19.7
Labour	7,616	13.8
Green	2,678	4.8
Turnout	55,277	72.5
Electorate	76,280	

== See also ==
- List of parliamentary constituencies in Essex
- List of parliamentary constituencies in the East of England (region)

== Notes ==
Parliament of the United Kingdom
Preceded by Richmond and Northallerton	Constituency represented by the leader of the opposition 2024 – present	Incumbent
