= Robert McCrindle =

Scottish politician (1929–1998)

Sir Robert Arthur McCrindle (19 September 1929 – 8 October 1998) was a Scottish Conservative Party politician. He was Member of Parliament for the English constituencies of Billericay from 1970 to 1974 and Brentwood and Ongar from 1974 to 1992 (following boundary changes).

== Personal life ==
Born in Glasgow, McCrindle was educated at Allan Glen's School. Sir Robert served in the Royal Air Force from 1947 to 1949 and spent nearly 2 years at RAF Changi, Singapore at the time of the Malaya emergency. In 1953 he married Myra Anderson with whom he had two sons, Alan and Raymond.

== Electoral history ==
McCrindle first contested Dundee East in the 1959 general election. He moved from Scotland to Essex in 1964, when he was defeated at Thurrock, and was elected for Billericay in 1970, serving until it was merged into the Basildon constituency in February 1974.

He was then returned for the new Brentwood and Ongar constituency, which re-elected him until his retirement at the 1992 general election, when he was succeeded by Eric Pickles.

== Parliamentary career ==
McCrindle was pro-European and to the left of centre on social policy issues. He was a regular rebel on such issues as the uprating of child benefit and NHS charges. Despite this he was a loyal Tory, and Margaret Thatcher arranged for him to be knighted in 1990, shortly before she left office. For seven days he was a Parliamentary Private Secretary to Mark Carlisle, a Home Office minister in the last days of the Heath government of 1974, but otherwise spent his career as a back-bencher.

An insurance broker by trade, McCrindle was an associate of the Chartered Insurance Institute and a parliamentary consultant to the insurance industry, and had a keen interest in pensions reform. He held a wide range of business interests, including a directorship of the Hogg Robinson travel agency. He also held a number of travel-related consultancies including British Caledonian and Trust House Forte, and was parliamentary adviser to the British Transport Police Federation.

As the chairman of the All-Party Parliamentary Aviation Committee from 1980 to 1992, McCrindle was involved in the aftermath of the Lockerbie disaster appearing on radio and television explaining what he believed should be done to improve the security of airlines after the bombing. He was also the first chairman of All Party Parliamentary Group (APPG) on Insurance and Financial Services, and a public affairs consultant to the Federation of Tour Operators from 1994 to 1998.

== Retirement ==
In his retirement, McCrindle produced a magazine, Interface, on politics for small businesses and continued to be a regular contributor as the City correspondent for Westminster's The House Magazine until the week before his death in 1998 aged 69.

Parliament of the United Kingdom
Preceded by Eric Moonman	Member of Parliament for Billericay; 1970–February 1974	Constituency abolished
New constituency	Member of Parliament for Brentwood and Ongar; February 1974–1992	Succeeded by Eric Pickles
