= Eric Moonman =

British politician

Eric Moonman (29 April 1929 – 22 December 2017) was a British Labour politician. He was Member of Parliament (MP) for Billericay (1966–70) and Basildon (1974–79).

Moonman was educated at Liverpool and Manchester Universities and became a senior research fellow in the Department of Management Science at Manchester University. He was a councillor on Stepney Borough Council, serving as Council Leader until 1965, and on the London Borough of Tower Hamlets from 1964.

Moonman contested Chigwell in 1964 without success and was elected for Billericay in the 1966 general election, losing the seat four years later. He then was elected for Basildon at the February 1974 election, but again lost his seat at the 1979 general election.

After his second electoral defeat, Moonman pursued an academic career, and became Professor of Management at City University, London and senior fellow, University of Liverpool.

Moonman was chair of Poale Zion (Great Britain) and president of Zionist Federation of Great Britain and Ireland.

== Early life ==
Eric Moonman was born in Liverpool on 29 April 1929 to Jewish parents, Borach and Leah Moonman. He attended Rathbone School in Liverpool which he left at the age of 13 to begin a seven-year apprenticeship at WJ Pugh Printers and then the Liverpool Echo. After the war, Moonman undertook his national service in the King's Liverpool Regiment from 1951 to 1953, during which he took courses in military studies as well as evening classes in subjects such as public speaking. In 1954 he gained a place at the University of Liverpool to study for a Diploma in Social Science. At Liverpool, he edited the university magazine and became chairman of the Labour Society. Moonman was awarded his diploma in 1955.

== After Parliament ==
=== Work on Israel ===
In June 1967, the Foreign Secretary George Brown made a speech to the UN General Assembly on the Israel-Arab Conflict. Moonman was one of a number of Labour MPs to accuse Brown of "taking sides" against Israel. At a Jewish ex-servicemen's rally in Southend, Moonman called Brown's speech a "serious embarrassment" and said he had "aggressively departed" from the Government's neutral policy, giving "harsh and arrogant advice" to the Israelis.

In 1972 Moonman was at the World Jewish Congress in Switzerland. He approached Stephen Roth, then director of the European Jewish Congress, and told him that changes had to be made in the way that Israel represented itself abroad. Roth accordingly gave him permission to start up a commission on Israel. In 1974, Moonman convened the first gathering of Jewish professionals to work out propaganda strategies.

The group subsequently met twice every year, once in Europe in the summer and once in Jerusalem in the autumn. Moonman was "the founder and guiding light" of the organisation which became the West European Public Relations Group for Information on Behalf of Israel. The group was initially funded by the World Jewish Congress which later withdrew its funding. From 1980 it was funded instead by the World Zionist Organization and from 1985 also by the Israel Foreign Ministry. The Register of Members' Interests 1975/6 records that Moonman visited a conference in Brussels in February 1976, which was probably the winter meeting of the West European Public Relations Group for Information on Behalf of Israel. The register records that Moonman was there as a representative of the Parliamentary Committee for the release of Soviet Jewry.

By 1975, Moonman was chairman of the Zionist Federation of Great Britain. In August that year he met with the Home Secretary Roy Jenkins to protest against the planned visit to London by two members of the Palestinian National Council (the political wing of the PLO). Moonman criticised the visit as "an attempt to become respectable". He added "we demean ourselves as human beings if at a convenient point of time we overlook the track record of these people".

In June 1977, The Sunday Times published a front-page story and a four-page 'Insight' investigation reporting the alleged torture of Palestinian prisoners in the occupied territories. The Israeli Embassy in London called the assertions a "vicious slander as it is insulting to the only democracy and free judiciary in the area". Moonman made three complaints about the reports to the Press Council, complaining that unproved accusations were reported as facts, that the paper misled readers with unsubstantiated quotes and headlines, and that Israel was denied the opportunity to comment before publication. His complaints were rejected.

In 1981 a broadcast by the Israeli Radio Peace and Progress (summarised by the BBC) referred to Moonman as one of several "leaders of the Zionist organizations in Britain"; although it is not clear if this referred to the West European Public Relations Group for Information on Behalf of Israel or another organisation. The broadcast reported that Moonman had "explained his" opposition to Menachem Begin in an article in The Jewish Chronicle, wherein Moonman argued that: "We must support Israel, but we must give consideration to the image of the Israel which we support. It is clear that Israel's Western allies are less and less interested in supporting Begin's Israel".

In 1985, Moonman forced the editor of the Jewish Quarterly to resign. According to his successor Colin Shindler: "The offence had been caused by a Jewish Quarterly editorial which questioned the actual dangers of anti-Semitism today as popularly viewed by Jewish leadership".

A 1986 report in The Guardian refers to Moonman as "chairman of the research committee of the Board of Deputies of British Jews", and Moonman's profile in Debrett's People of Today states that that year he was appointed senior vice-president. At this stage, Moonman was also a board member of the British-Israel Public Affairs Committee (BIPAC) where he worked on a publication called EEC Monitor. In 1987, however he was forced to resign from BIPAC after a financial scandal which he considered the result of a campaign against him. Below is an extract from The Guardian explaining the circumstances of Moonman's departure from BIPAC:

An unusual advert has just appeared in The Jewish Chronicle, asking anyone who knows about a campaign of malice against the former Labour MP Eric Moonman to send the information to a box number. It has been placed, of course, by Moonman himself, who is senior vice-president of the Board of Deputies of British Jews, and chairman of the Islington Area Health Authority in London. Until recently he was also a board member of the British-Israel Public Affairs Committee (BIPAC), but he resigned at the last meeting following what might be called the Alexander Keddie Affair. Keddie doesn't actually exist, although he was once described as a recluse in Essex who didn't like taking phone calls; the name was simply used over a period of about four years to steer payments to a variety of people, including Moonman, who worked on a BIPAC publication called EEC Monitor. An accountant's report into the affair was prompted by Monty Summary, a prominent Jewish businessman and fundraiser, and it concluded that Moonman had left people confused about the Keddie arrangement. Moonman denies this, and is now intent on unmasking his putative tormentors. 'I do think there is a campaign against me,' he said this week. 'There have been anonymous letters and phone calls as well.'”

By 2001, Moonman had joined the Zionist Federation of Great Britain and Ireland. In mid January 2002, the New Statesman reported that he headed the Zionist Federation's Media Response Unit; organising email and letter writing campaigns against journalists perceived to be antisemitic or critical of Israel. A week after the publishing of that article, Moonman had reportedly become President of the organisation.

=== Terrorism expert ===
Moonman's emergence as a terrorism expert seems to have stemmed from his involvement in an organisation called the Centre for Contemporary Studies, a think-tank which published material on football hooliganism and race relations, as well as terrorism. The Centre appears to have been founded by Moonman who seems to have been affected by the Brixton riots and anxious about the possibility of societal breakdown.

In May 1981, the Centre published a report called "The Nazis are in the Playground". According to the BBC's Nationwide programme, it "claims extreme right-wing groups are recruiting school children & authorities are unable to control the situation". The BBC interviewed Moonman on this on Nationwide. BBC archive records state that he "discusses young racism increasing 50% in 2 yrs; subtle strategies used; importance of process for future of N.F; accuses N.U.T of indifference, and gives Centre's proposals". Later in 1981 a further report on the role of neo-fascist groups in music led to an interview with Joan Bakewell on Newsnight. According to the BBC's archives Moonman welcomed a "declaration by group 'Madness' that they have nothing to do with National Front & British Movement; extreme right see concerts as a potential market for their magazines".

In writings, he focused in particular on the influence of media and television. He published a report in October 1981 on the riots that summer called "Copycat Hooligans", which argued that: "Youths imitated television film of violence in Northern Ireland when they rioted in more than 20 British cities last summer... Eric Moonman, the centre's director and author of the report entitled Copy Cat Hooligans, said the rioters knew what to do because they had seen it on television.

In 1987, Moonman published a book called The Violent Society which included contributions from prominent terrorologists Paul Wilkinson and Richard Clutterbuck. Paul Wilkinson was identified in the contributors notes as a member of the advisory board of the Centre for Contemporary Studies. Insight, the Alumni magazine for Liverpool University, wrote that The Violent Society 'was well received and, surprisingly for Eric, marked another chapter in his life'. The article states that after the publication of The Violent Society Moonman 'began to take on consultancy work for ITN as an expert in counter-terrorism'.

In fact, Moonman's media presence as a terrorism expert does not seem to have taken off for another 15 years. The television archive contains only one item in the 1990s listing Moonman as a terrorism expert and the note does not contain an exact date. With the exception of that item, Moonman's first appearance seems to have been on a Channel Five Lunchtime Bulletin on 18 July 2002, after which he appeared dozens of times on UK television.

In 1998, Moonman was appointed as a member of the advisory board of the Centre for Counter Terrorism Studies at the Potomac Institute for Policy Studies. He appeared at an 'Executive Luncheon' hosted by the group on 26 November 2001. The panel was chaired by Yonah Alexander, the director of the International Center for Terrorism Studies and a fellow Zionist and seminal terrorism expert; and Michael Swetnam, CEO and chairman of the Potomac Institute. Moonman said he thought the media had been, "highly responsible and supportive of U.S. and international efforts to root out terrorism". Of the critics of the War on Terror, Moonman said: "Many are Muslim, though most Muslims are friendly, good citizens who favor peace. Still, Taliban supporters are currently protesting and causing unrest in both England and the whole of Europe. Many of these dissidents are merely taking advantage of the situation, rather than genuinely pursuing the ideals of peace. Legitimate peace movement leaders, in fact, have actually spoken out against these protesters." He warned of "Usama bin Laden’s slick operation shows the extent to which public opinion can be bought with marketing and public relations expenditures," and argued that, "we must fight terrorists on their own terms. We can’t afford to abide by the Queensbury rules of war in the face of such a dangerous and unscrupulous threat."

=== Health policy ===
After his parliamentary career ended, Moonman became involved in health policy and was chairman of Islington Health Authority 1980–90. He created controversy within the Labour Party because of his support for privatisation within the National Health Service (NHS). He was able to win a vote in favour of privatisation by reintroducing the matter on a much-criticised pretext at a meeting at which his supporters were in the majority. In 1987, at the Annual conference of the Social Democratic Party, Moonman argued for a greater role for the private sector. According to BBC Archives: "Eric MOONMAN, Islington, must look at alternative funding for the NHS & consider working with private sector".

Parliament of the United Kingdom
| Preceded by Edward Gardner | Member of Parliament for Billericay; 1966–1970 | Succeeded by Robert McCrindle |
| New constituency | Member of Parliament for Basildon; February 1974–1979 | Succeeded by Harvey Proctor |
