= John Baron (politician) =

British politician (born 1959)

John Baron CBE
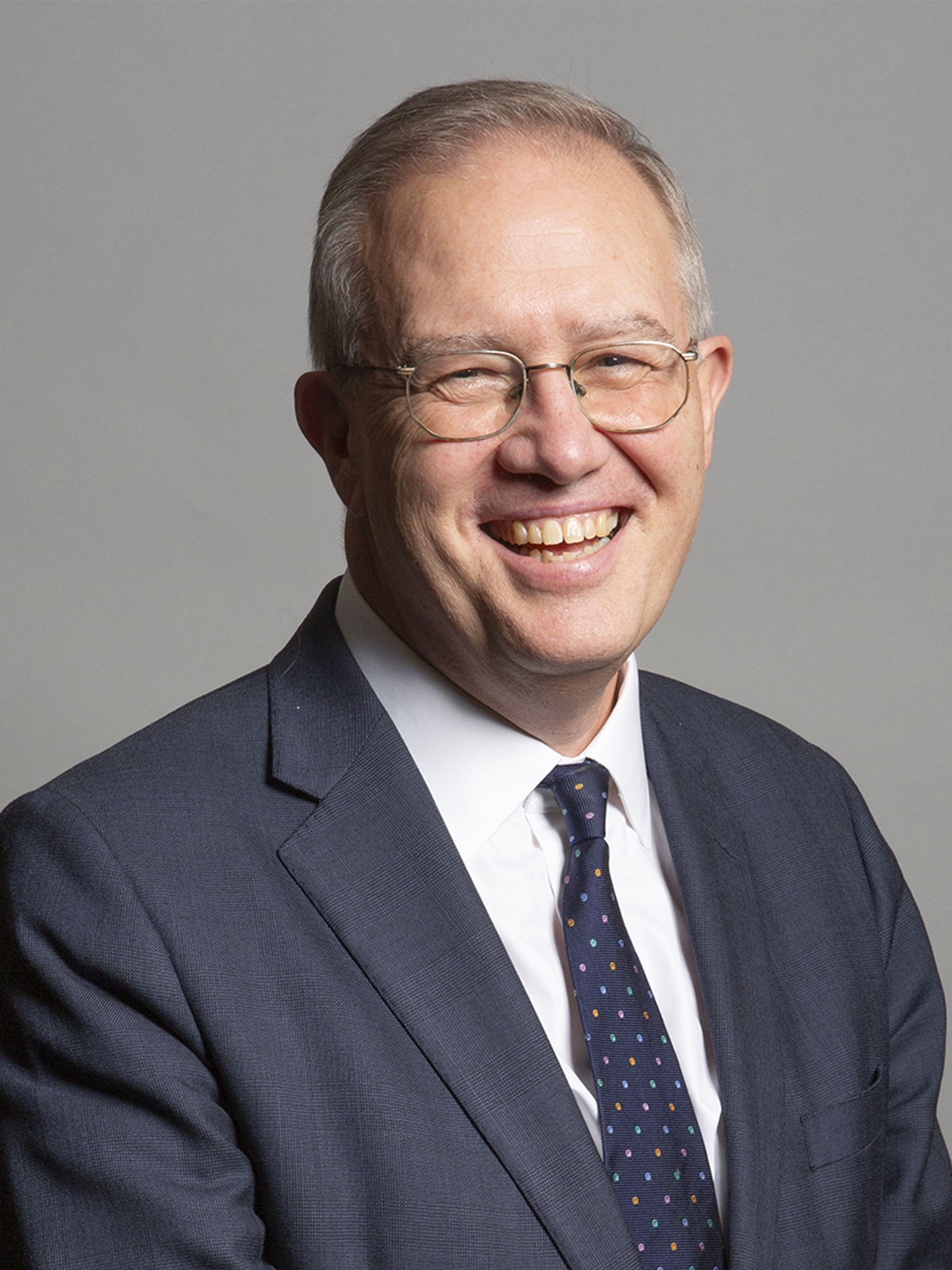
- Official portrait, 2019

Member of Parliament for Basildon and Billericay Billericay (2001–2010)
- In office 7 June 2001 – 30 May 2024
- Preceded by: Teresa Gorman
- Succeeded by: Richard Holden

Personal details
- Born: 21 June 1959 (age 67) Redhill, England
- Party: Conservative
- Education: Jesus College, Cambridge
- Website: www.johnbaron.co.uk

Military service
- Allegiance: United Kingdom
- Branch/service: British Army
- Years of service: 1984–1988
- Rank: Captain
- Unit: Royal Regiment of Fusiliers
- Battles/wars: Northern Ireland; Cyprus; Germany

John Charles Baron (born 21 June 1959) is a British Conservative Party politician who served as the Member of Parliament (MP) for Basildon and Billericay, previously Billericay, from 2001 to 2024. He has frequently rebelled against his party, specifically in his calling for a referendum on the European Union (EU) before the 2015 election and in opposing military intervention in Iraq, Libya, and Syria.

Baron is a strong critic of the EU; he was a vocal supporter of Brexit during the 2016 EU referendum. He later supported the pro-Brexit campaign Leave Means Leave campaign.

Baron stepped down after 23 years as an MP at the 2024 general election, despite being reselected by the local Conservative association.

== Early life and education ==
John Baron was born in Redhill, Surrey, and was privately educated at the Queen's College, Taunton, followed by studies at Jesus College, Cambridge and at the Royal Military Academy Sandhurst.

== Career ==
=== Military service ===
After university, Baron was accepted into the Royal Regiment of Fusiliers on 3 January 1984 as a second lieutenant (on probation). He was commissioned and promoted to lieutenant with seniority from 8 August 1984. He was promoted to captain on 8 February 1987. He served in Northern Ireland, Cyprus and Germany.

On 3 January 1988, he transferred to the Regular Army Reserve of Officers. This signalled the end of his military career, but he remained liable to call up. He resigned his commission on 1 June 1997.

=== Banking career ===
In 1987, he became a merchant banker: working as a fund manager then director of Henderson Private Investors Ltd (later Henderson Global Investors) and Rothschild Asset Management.

=== Political career ===
In 1995, Baron became the treasurer of the Streatham Conservative Association.

In 1997 David Amess decided not to risk standing again in his ultra-marginal Conservative seat of Basildon and was elected for the safer seat of Southend West. Baron was selected as the Conservative in Basildon. At the 1997 general election, Baron came second with 30.8% of the vote behind the Labour candidate Angela Smith.

== Parliamentary career ==
In November 1999, Teresa Gorman announced intention to stand down at the next general election from Billericay. Baron was selected to defend Billericay at the 2001 general election, when he was elected as MP for Billericay with 47.4% of the vote and a majority of 5,013. He made his maiden speech on 20 July 2001.

Baron was a member of Iain Duncan Smith's frontbench team, but resigned in March 2003 in protest at his support of the Iraq War. He was re-appointed by Duncan Smith as a health spokesman four months later, a position he held until July 2007 when he was moved to the Conservative Whip's Office.

At the 2005 general election, Baron was re-elected as MP for Billericay with an increased vote share of 52.2% and an increased majority of 11,206.

Baron was a strong backer of David Davis in the 2005 Conservative leadership election, having also supported him in the 2001 leadership contest won by Iain Duncan Smith.

Prior to the 2010 general election, Baron's constituency of Billericay was abolished, and was replaced by Basildon and Billericay. At the general election, Baron was elected as MP for Basildon and Billericay with 52.8% of the vote and a majority of 12,338.

Baron was the only Conservative among just 15 MPs who voted against British participation in the attack on Libya in the Commons on 21 March 2011. In 2013 he tabled a backbench motion to mandate a vote in Parliament before providing "lethal support" to anti-government forces in Syria, which ultimately prevented further military intervention when the government was unable to secure the necessary parliamentary support and he was also part of a minority voting against the government on air strikes against Islamic State of Iraq and the Levant.

In June 2012, Baron delivered a letter, signed by over 100 Tory MPs, to the Prime Minister David Cameron urging him "to place on the Statute Book before the next General Election a commitment to hold a referendum during the next Parliament on the nature of our relationship with the European Union". In May 2013 he tabled a rebel amendment to the Queen's Speech to "express regret" that a referendum on the EU could not be held sooner, which was backed by over 100 MPs.

His reputation as a Eurosceptic and "serial rebel" saw his name mentioned as a possible defector to the UK Independence Party. Speaking to the BBC's Newsnight in response to speculation in late 2014, Baron said: "You should never say never in politics, but the bottom line is my very strong preference is to stay within the Conservative party."

In July 2014, Mark d'Arcy of the BBC named Baron his choice in "Parliamentarians of the Year" for 2013/14 for his role in opposing military action in Syria and seeking a promise of a referendum on membership of the European Union, writing that "he is not a household name or a fiery orator, but his fingerprints are all over the two most significant parliamentary events of the last 12 months."

At the 2015 general election, Baron was re-elected as MP for Basildon and Billericay with a decreased vote share of 52.7% and an increased majority of 12,482.

In December 2015 he voted against further airstrikes in Syria.

He was again re-elected at the snap 2017 general election, with an increased vote share of 61% and an increased majority of 13,400. At the 2019 general election he was again re-elected with an increased vote share of 67.1% and an increased majority of 20,412.

Following the publication of the Sue Gray Report, Baron withdrew support for prime minister Boris Johnson calling for his resignation stating, "I'm afraid the Prime Minister no longer enjoys my support".

Baron was appointed Commander of the Order of the British Empire (CBE) in the 2023 Birthday Honours for political and public service.

== Personal life ==
Baron is married and has two daughters.

Parliament of the United Kingdom
Preceded by Teresa Gorman	Member of Parliament for Billericay; 2001–2010	Constituency abolished
New constituency	Member of Parliament for Basildon and Billericay; 2010–2024	Succeeded by Richard Holden
