= Brentwood and Ongar =

UK Parliament constituency (since 1974)

Coordinates: 51.68°N 0.23°E

- County constituency for the House of Commons
- Interactive map of boundaries since 2024
- Location within the East of England
- County: Essex
- Population: 92,957 (2011 census)
- Electorate: 74,937 (March 2020)
- Major settlements: Brentwood, Ingatestone, Ongar, Shenfield, West Horndon

Current constituency
- Created: 1974
- Member of Parliament: Alex Burghart (Conservative)
- Seats: One
- Created from: Billericay and Chigwell

Brentwood and Ongar is a constituency (Note: A county constituency (for the purposes of election expenses and type of returning officer)) in Essex represented in the House of Commons of the UK Parliament since 2017 by Alex Burghart, a Conservative. He served from October 2022 to July 2024 as Parliamentary Secretary for the Cabinet Office and had been Deputy Leader of the Conservative Party since August 2026. (Note: As with all constituencies, the constituency elects one Member of Parliament (MP) by the first past the post system of election at least every five years.)

== Constituency profile ==
The Brentwood and Ongar constituency is located in Essex and covers rural areas to the north-east of Greater London. The largest settlement is the town of Brentwood with a population of around 55,000. Other settlements include the small town of Chipping Ongar, the village of Ingatestone and many smaller villages. The constituency is predominantly agricultural. Brentwood lies on a Roman road and was traditionally a stopping point for travel between London and East Anglia.

House prices in the constituency are high and residents are generally more religious and have high levels of income and professional employment compared to national averages. Parts of Brentwood are in the top 10% of least-deprived areas in England. White people make up 90% of the population. At the local councils that cover the constituency, most of Brentwood is represented by Liberal Democrat councillors whilst the rural areas have mostly elected Conservatives. Most voters in the constituency favoured leaving the European Union in the 2016 referendum; an estimated 61% supported Brexit compared to 52% nationally.

== History ==
The seat was created for the February 1974 general election, primarily from part of the abolished constituency of Billericay. It has always been a safe Conservative seat.

It was held by Eric Pickles between the General Election in 1992 and 2017 when he stood down. The Liberal Democrats amassed their largest share of the vote in 1992 (including results for their two predecessor parties). At the 2010 election their candidate was second-placed with 13.6% of the vote, ahead of the Labour Party's candidate, but this proved the peak of their support, as they declined to fourth place in 2015 and then behind Labour in 2017 and 2019.

In the 2001 election, Pickles was opposed by Martin Bell, who had represented the Tatton constituency in the last Parliament as an independent and had pledged not to seek re-election there. Bell failed to gain Brentwood and Ongar from the Conservatives, but cut the Conservative majority to just 6.5%, the lowest in the seat's history.

The pattern of elections in the seat was disrupted by the emergence of UKIP who jumped to second place in 2015. Following the retirement of Eric Pickles, in the 2017 and 2019 elections it was the Labour Party candidate who emerged as the main challengers to the Conservatives in the seat.

== Boundaries and boundary changes ==
=== Historic ===
==== 1974–1983 ====
- The Urban District of Brentwood;
- The Rural District of Epping and Ongar parishes of Abbess Beauchamp and Berners Roding, Blackmore, Bobbingworth, Doddinghurst, Fyfield, High Laver, High Ongar, Kelvedon Hatch, Lambourne, Little Laver, Moreton, Navestock, Ongar, Stanford Rivers, Stapleford Abbotts, Stapleford Tawney, Stondon Massey, Theydon Mount, and Willingale.

The Urban District of Brentwood was previously part of the abolished constituency of Billericay, and the parishes in the Rural District of Epping and Ongar (which had previously constituted the Rural District of Ongar) had been part of the abolished constituency of Chigwell.

==== 1983–2010 ====
- The District of Brentwood;
- The District of Epping Forest wards of Chipping Ongar, Greensted and Marden Ash, High Ongar, Lambourne, Moreton and Matching, Passingford, Roothing Country, and Shelley.

Two parishes, formerly part of the Rural District of Chelmsford and included in the District of Brentwood under the Local Government Act 1972, transferred from Chelmsford. Other marginal changes.

==== 2010–2024 ====
- The Borough of Brentwood;
- The District of Epping Forest wards of Chipping Ongar, Greensted and Marden Ash; High Ongar, Willingale and The Rodings; Lambourne; Moreton and Fyfield; North Weald Bassett; Passingford; and Shelley.

North Weald Bassett ward transferred from Epping Forest. Other marginal changes due to redistribution of local authority wards.

=== Current ===
The 2023 review of Westminster constituencies, which was based on the ward structure in place on 1 December 2020, left the boundaries virtually unchanged. However, following a local government boundary review in Epping Forest which came into effect in May 2024, the constituency now comprises the following from the 2024 general election:

- The Borough of Brentwood;
- The District of Epping Forest wards or part wards of: Chigwell with Lambourne (Lambourne parish); North Weald Bassett (most); Ongar (all); Rural East (excluding parishes of Matching and Sheering); Theydon Bois with Passingford (excluding Theydon Bois parish).

== Members of Parliament ==
Billericay and Chigwell prior to 1974

Election	Member	Party
Feb 1974	Sir Robert McCrindle	Conservative
1992	Sir Eric Pickles	Conservative
2017	Alex Burghart	Conservative

== Elections ==
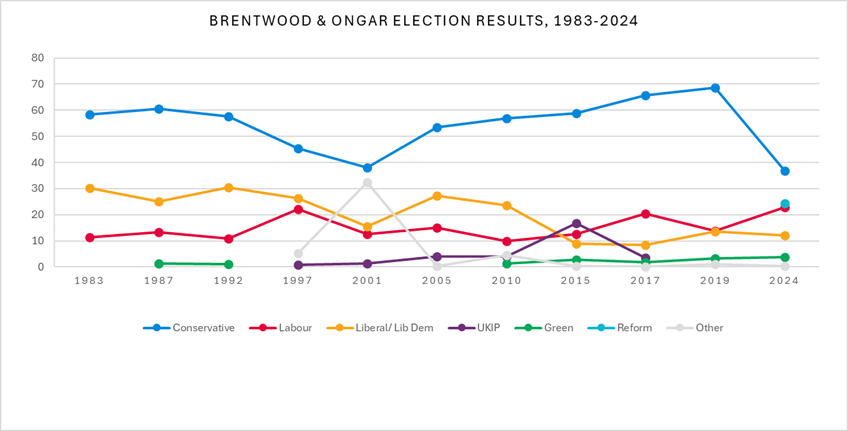
Brentwood & Ongar election results 1983–2024

=== Elections in the 2020s ===
General election 2024: Brentwood and Ongar
Party	Candidate	Votes	%	±%
Conservative	Alex Burghart	17,731	36.7	−31.8
Reform	Paul Godfrey	11,751	24.3	New
Labour	Gareth Barrett	11,082	22.9	+9.2
Liberal Democrats	David Kendall	5,809	12.0	−1.6
Green	Reece Learmouth	1,770	3.7	+0.5
English Democrat	Robin Tilbrook	189	0.4	−0.6
Majority		5,980	12.4	−42.5
Turnout		48,332	64.1	−6.4
Registered electors		75,352		
Conservative hold		Swing		

=== Elections in the 2010s ===
2019 notional result
Party	Vote	%
Conservative	36,202	68.5
Labour	7,228	13.7
Liberal Democrats	7,179	13.6
Green	1,675	3.2
Others	532	1.0
Turnout	52,816	70.5
Electorate	74,937	

General election 2019: Brentwood and Ongar
Party	Candidate	Votes	%	±%
Conservative	Alex Burghart	36,308	68.6	+2.8
Labour	Oliver Durose	7,243	13.7	−6.7
Liberal Democrats	David Kendall	7,187	13.6	+5.2
Green	Paul Jeater	1,679	3.2	+1.5
English Democrat	Robin Tilbrook	532	1.0	New
Majority		29,065	54.9	+9.5
Turnout		52,949	70.4	−0.2
Conservative hold		Swing	+4.8	

General election 2017: Brentwood and Ongar
Party	Candidate	Votes	%	±%
Conservative	Alex Burghart	34,811	65.8	+7.0
Labour	Gareth Barrett	10,809	20.4	+7.9
Liberal Democrats	Karen Chilvers	4,426	8.4	−0.4
UKIP	Mick McGough	1,845	3.5	−13.3
Green	Paul Jeater	915	1.7	−1.0
Independent	Louca Kousoulou	104	0.2	New
Majority		24,002	45.4	+3.4
Turnout		52,910	70.6	−1.0
Conservative hold		Swing	−0.5	

General election 2015: Brentwood and Ongar
Party	Candidate	Votes	%	±%
Conservative	Eric Pickles	30,534	58.8	+1.9
UKIP	Mick McGough	8,724	16.8	+12.8
Labour	Liam Preston	6,492	12.5	+2.6
Liberal Democrats	David Kendall	4,577	8.8	−14.7
Green	Reza Hossain	1,397	2.7	+1.5
English Democrat	Robin Tilbrook	173	0.3	−0.7
Majority		21,810	42.0	+8.6
Turnout		51,897	71.6	−0.3
Conservative hold		Swing	−5.4	

General election 2010: Brentwood and Ongar
Party	Candidate	Votes	%	±%
Conservative	Eric Pickles	28,792	56.9	+2.9
Liberal Democrats	David Kendall	11,872	23.5	−3.4
Labour	Heidi Benzing	4,992	9.9	−4.9
UKIP	Michael McGough	2,037	4.0	−0.1
BNP	Paul Morris	1,447	2.9	New
Green	Jess Barnecutt	584	1.2	New
English Democrat	Robin Tilbrook	491	1.0	New
Independent	James Sapwell	263	0.5	New
Independent	Danny Attfield	113	0.2	New
Majority		16,920	33.4	+7.1
Turnout		50,591	71.9	+4.0
Conservative hold		Swing	+3.1	

=== Elections in the 2000s ===
General election 2005: Brentwood and Ongar
Party	Candidate	Votes	%	±%
Conservative	Eric Pickles	23,609	53.5	+15.5
Liberal Democrats	Gavin Stollar	11,997	27.2	+11.6
Labour	John Adams	6,579	14.9	+2.3
UKIP	Stuart Gulleford	1,805	4.1	+2.7
Independent	Anthony Appleton	155	0.4	+0.3
Majority		11,612	26.3	+19.8
Turnout		44,145	68.4	+1.1
Conservative hold		Swing	+2.0	

General election 2001: Brentwood and Ongar
Party	Candidate	Votes	%	±%
Conservative	Eric Pickles	16,558	38.0	−7.4
Independent	Martin Bell	13,737	31.5	New
Liberal Democrats	David Kendall	6,772	15.6	−10.7
Labour	Diana Johnson	5,505	12.6	−9.5
UKIP	Kenneth Gulleford	611	1.4	+0.5
Independent	Peter Pryke	239	0.5	New
Church of the Militant Elvis	David Bishop	68	0.2	New
Independent	Anthony Appleton	52	0.1	New
Majority		2,821	6.5	−12.6
Turnout		43,542	67.3	−9.3
Conservative hold		Swing		

=== Elections in the 1990s ===
General election 1997: Brentwood and Ongar
Party	Candidate	Votes	%	±%
Conservative	Eric Pickles	23,031	45.4	−12.2
Liberal Democrats	Elizabeth Bottomley	13,341	26.3	−4.2
Labour	Marc Young	11,231	22.1	+11.2
Referendum	Angela Kilmartin	2,658	5.2	New
UKIP	David Mills	465	0.9	New
Majority		9,690	19.1	−8.0
Turnout		50,726	76.6	−8.1
Conservative hold		Swing	−4.0	

General election 1992: Brentwood and Ongar
Party	Candidate	Votes	%	±%
Conservative	Eric Pickles	32,145	57.6	−2.9
Liberal Democrats	Elizabeth Bottomley	17,000	30.5	+5.5
Labour	Jeremiah Keohane	6,080	10.9	−2.3
Green	Carolyn Bartley	555	1.0	−0.3
Majority		15,145	27.1	−8.4
Turnout		55,780	84.7	+5.7
Conservative hold		Swing	−4.2	

=== Elections in the 1980s ===
General election 1987: Brentwood and Ongar
Party	Candidate	Votes	%	±%
Conservative	Robert McCrindle	32,258	60.5	+2.1
Liberal	Nicholas Amor	13,337	25.0	−5.3
Labour	James Orpe	7,042	13.2	+1.8
Green	Margaret Willis	686	1.3	New
Majority		18,921	35.5	+7.4
Turnout		53,323	79.0	+2.4
Conservative hold		Swing	+3.7	

General election 1983: Brentwood and Ongar
Party	Candidate	Votes	%	±%
Conservative	Robert McCrindle	29,484	58.4	−2.0
Liberal	Nicholas Amor	15,282	30.3	+16.0
Labour	James Orpe	5,739	11.4	−13.9
Majority		14,202	28.1	−7.0
Turnout		50,505	76.6	−4.0
Conservative hold		Swing	−9.0	

=== Elections in the 1970s ===
General election 1979: Brentwood and Ongar
Party	Candidate	Votes	%	±%
Conservative	Robert McCrindle	29,113	60.4	+13.5
Labour	Ian James Crofton Peddie	12,182	25.3	−4.0
Liberal	Colin Cenydd Jones	6,882	14.3	−9.5
Majority		16,931	35.1	+17.5
Turnout		48,177	80.6	+3.4
Conservative hold		Swing	+8.8	

General election October 1974: Brentwood and Ongar
Party	Candidate	Votes	%	±%
Conservative	Robert McCrindle	21,136	46.9	+0.3
Labour	Henry Edward Miller	13,190	29.3	+3.7
Liberal	Lionel Rufus Wernick	10,725	23.8	−4.0
Majority		7,946	17.6	−1.2
Turnout		45,051	77.2	−6.6
Conservative hold		Swing	−1.7	

General election February 1974: Brentwood and Ongar
Party	Candidate	Votes	%	±%
Conservative	Robert McCrindle	22,545	46.6	
Liberal	Lionel Rufus Wernick	13,452	27.8	
Labour	Maurice Howard Rosen	12,398	25.6	
Majority		9,093	18.8	
Turnout		48,395	83.8	
Conservative win (new seat)				

== Graphical representation ==
February 1974 New seat
25.6%	27.8%	46.6%
Labour	Liberal	Conservative

October 1974
29.3%	23.8%	46.9%
Labour	Liberal	Conservative

1979
25.3%	14.3%	60.4%
Labour	Liberal	Conservative

1983
11.4%	30.3%	58.4%
Labour	Liberal	Conservative

1987
13.2%	25.0%	60.5%
Labour	Liberal	Conservative

1992
10.9%	30.5%	57.6%
Labour	Lib Dems	Conservative

1997
22.1%	26.3%	45.4%
Labour	Lib Dems	Conservative	Ref

2001
12.6%	15.6%	31.5%	38.0%
Labour	Lib Dems	Martin Bell	Conservative

2005
14.9%	27.2%	53.5%
Labour	Lib Dems	Conservative	UKIP

2010
9.9%	23.5%	56.9%
Lab	Lib Dems	Conservative	UKIP

2015
12.5%		58.8%	16.8%
Labour	Lib Dems	Conservative	UKIP

2017
20.4%		65.8%
Labour	Lib Dems	Conservative	UKIP

2019
13.7%	13.6%	68.6%
Labour	Lib Dems	Conservative

== See also ==
- List of parliamentary constituencies in Essex
