= James McMurdock =

British politician (born 1986)

James McMurdock MP
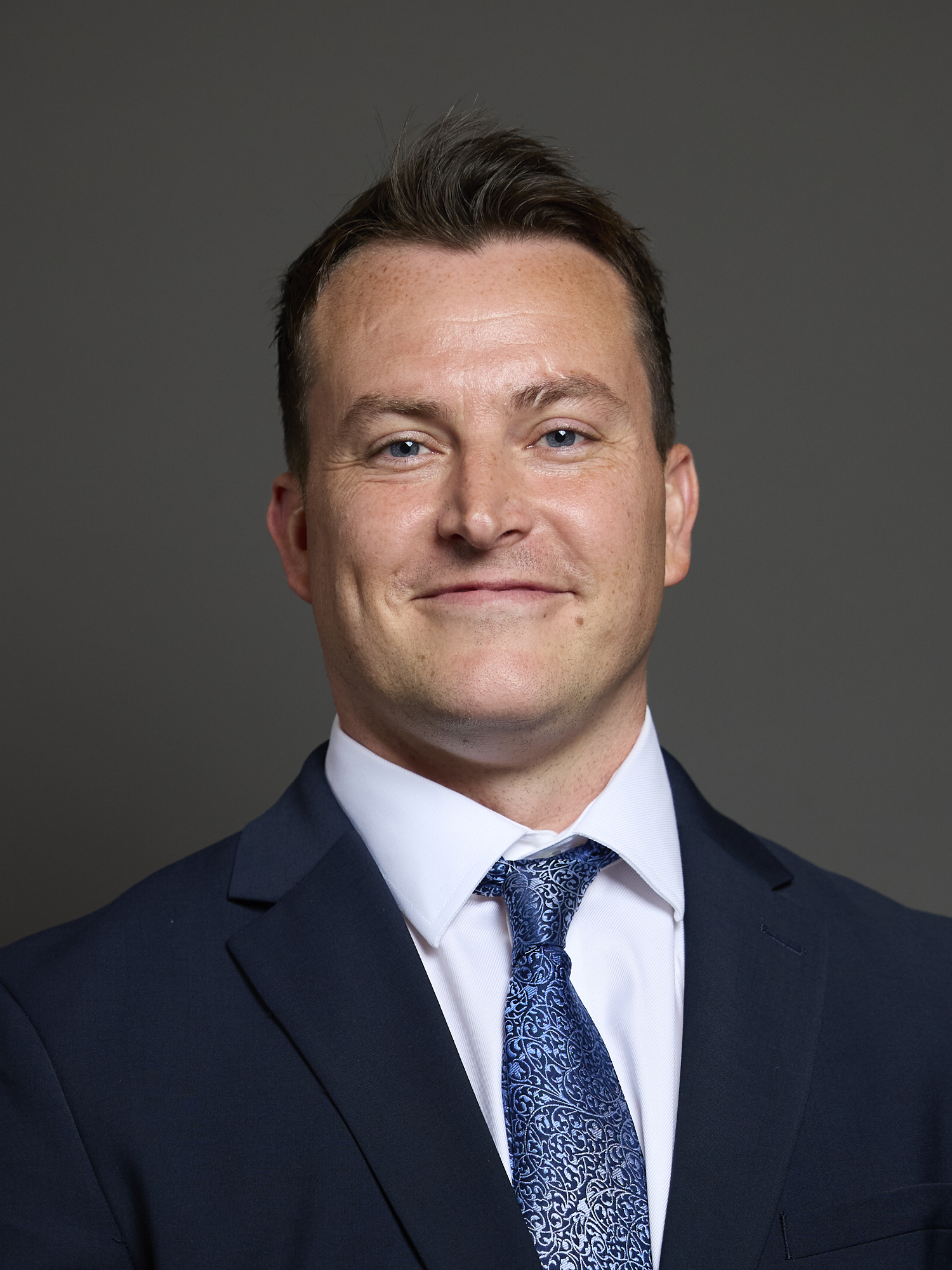
- Official portrait, 2024

Member of Parliament for South Basildon and East Thurrock
- Incumbent
- Assumed office 4 July 2024
- Preceded by: Stephen Metcalfe
- Majority: 98 (0.25%)

Personal details
- Born: James Antony McMurdock; June 1986 (age 40)
- Party: Independent (since 2025)
- Other political affiliations: Reform UK (2024–2025)
- Children: 4
- Education: University of Sussex (BA)

James Antony McMurdock (born June 1986) is a British politician who has served as the member of Parliament (MP) for South Basildon and East Thurrock since 2024. Elected for Reform UK, McMurdock left the party in July 2025 following allegations that he had received £70,000 in Bounce Back business loans during the COVID-19 pandemic, despite his businesses "being effectively dormant". He currently serves as an independent MP.

== Early life and education ==
James Antony McMurdock was born in June 1986. He grew up in Basildon, Essex, in a council house in Vange and went to a state school. He was the first person from his family to go to university, graduating from the University of Sussex with a BA in economics. During his time at the university, he was elected treasurer of the rugby club and co-founded the finance society there.

According to a biography on the Reform website, he worked in the banking sector from 2007 until winning his seat in 2024. McMurdock spent the majority of his career working for Standard Chartered Bank and Barclays Capital, overseeing UK and India offices as Senior Director. Earlier in his career he worked at Goldman Sachs and Lehman Brothers, specialising in corporate loans, primarily supporting clients in the energy, infrastructure, and manufacturing sectors. Byline Times reported that his role at Goldman Sachs lasted three months and was probably an internship, and that McMurdock would have still been studying at university when Lehman Brothers went bust in 2008. They also reported that his LinkedIn profile previously listed him working for his mother's accountancy firm until 2010.

== Political career ==
=== Reform UK campaign (2024) ===
McMurdock joined Reform UK in May 2024, having become disillusioned with the main political parties, later stating to The Daily Telegraph that he "didn't like the choices in front of me as a voter". After paying £25 to join the party, McMurdock received an email stating that the party needed candidates for the 2024 general election. He agreed to be a paper candidate for South Basildon and East Thurrock and paid another £25 for vetting.

During the campaign, he acted as his own election agent, and spent £400 on 20,000 fliers. McMurdock did not know that political fliers require mentioning the sponsor, so he and his wife spent many evenings manually stamping each leaflet to add that Reform UK was sponsoring his candidacy. The candidate received £95 in contributions, and mostly communicated to voters on TikTok, where he gained 10,000 followers.

McMurdock was elected with a majority of 98 votes (0.25%). Owing to the tight margin, Jack Ferguson, the Labour Party candidate demanded two separate recounts. McMurdock won all 3 counts with winning margins of 127, 80, and finally 98. After the third count Labour who were in second place conceded the race. His parents and two sisters acted as his count agent. McMurdock gained the seat from Conservative Party incumbent Stephen Metcalfe, who had served as the constituency's MP for the preceding 14 years. He acknowledged he initially thought that his chance of winning was slim, but that due to being on paternity leave when the election was called, he was able to devote himself to campaigning.

One party insider reportedly said that McMurdock's victory was the first time he had heard of the candidate; those within the Reform campaign stated that 95% of its candidates received no help from the party, which did not expect them to win. McMurdock became one of two Reform UK MPs in Essex, along with leader Nigel Farage, and one of five Reform UK MPs elected in the 2024 general election. His majority was the seventh smallest in the general election, and due to the recounts, was the last to be called in England.

=== Parliament (2024–present) ===
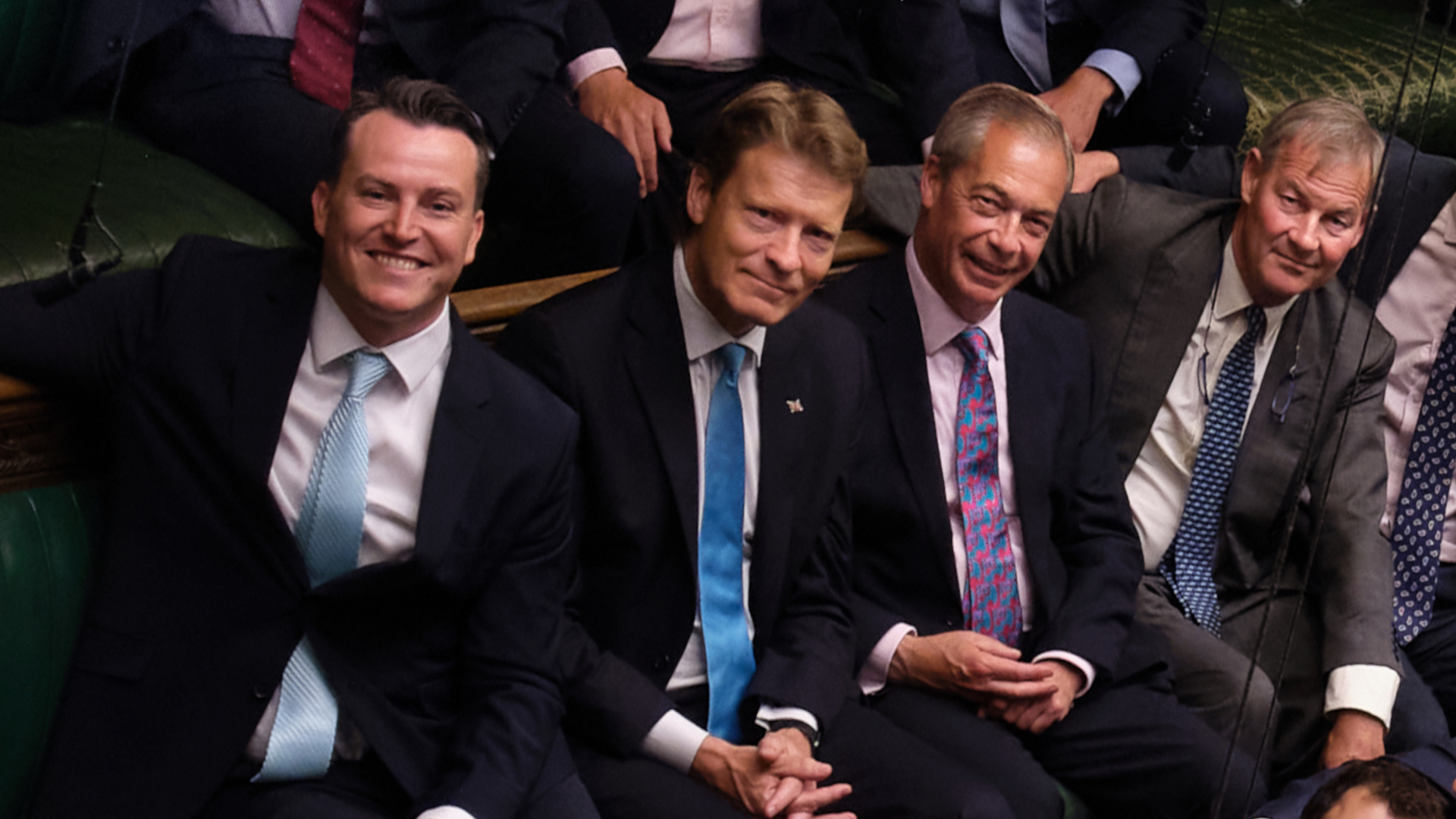
McMurdock (left) with fellow Reform UK MPs Richard Tice, Nigel Farage and Rupert Lowe in July 2024

On 5 July 2025, an investigation by The Times was published that alleged McMurdock had claimed £70,000 in Bounce Back business loans from the UK Government during the Covid pandemic in 2020 through two companies he owned. The first, JAM Financial Limited, "had no employees and negligible assets", but he claimed £50,000; this was the maximum available and would have required an annual turnover of at least £200,000. He claimed £20,000 for a second company, Gym Live Health and Fitness Limited, which had been dormant until January 2020; this would have required a minimum turnover of £80,000.

Having been forewarned of The Times investigation, McMurdock suspended himself from Reform UK and its party whip. He stated that "all my business dealings had always been conducted fully within the law and in compliance with all regulations" and that he would cooperate fully with any investigation. On 8 July he permanently left the party and announced on Twitter he would continue as an independent MP.

Daniel Greenberg in August 2025 rejected a complaint brought by Jon Pearce MP against McMurdock. The Parliamentary Commissioner for Standards stated that McMurdock had been erroneously advised that he did not have to declare his unpaid directorship of Gym Live Health and Fitness and that McMurdock should do so. In March 2026, both McMurdock and Farage said that they hoped McMurdock would rejoin Reform.

=== Political positions ===
McMurdock identifies as a conservative. He has described himself a "small state" and "low tax" person, and stated that he wants "government out of people's lives", and also for "decisions and spending to be accountable to taxpayers."

== Personal life ==
McMurdock is married with four children.

=== Assault conviction ===
In 2006, McMurdock, who was aged 19, was convicted of assault on his ex-girlfriend. McMurdock was working as a barman at the time of the assault, which happened outside a nightclub in Chelmsford. He pleaded guilty to one count of assault at Chelmsford Crown Court and spent 21 days in a young offenders institution. He received a custodial sentence for "kicking" the victim "around four times".

McMurdock did not reveal this conviction before being elected as an MP in 2024, leading to accusations of misleading the public. After the conviction became public, he called it his "biggest regret" and apologised. However, he claimed he only "pushed" the victim, a statement contradicted by court records that showed he kicked her repeatedly. The victim's mother stated that he left marks on her and believes he should not be an MP. Some political opponents have called for his removal.

A spokesperson for Reform UK, McMurdock's party, said they knew about his past conviction, which is now considered 'spent'. In an interview in January 2025, McMurdock again apologised. The Reform UK Party Leader, Nigel Farage, stated that McMurdock was not vetted initially and did not confirm if he would pass new vetting procedures.

Parliament of the United Kingdom
Preceded by Stephen Metcalfe	Member of Parliament for South Basildon and East Thurrock; 2024–present	Incumbent
