= South Basildon and East Thurrock =

UK Parliament constituency (since 2010)

Coordinates: 51.53°N 0.44°E

- Borough constituency for the House of Commons
- Interactive map of boundaries since 2024
- Location within the East of England
- County: Essex
- Electorate: 73,322 (March 2020)
- Major settlements: Laindon, Pitsea, Stanford-le-Hope

Current constituency
- Created: 2010
- Member of Parliament: James McMurdock (Independent)
- Seats: One
- Created from: Basildon, Billericay and Thurrock

South Basildon and East Thurrock is a constituency represented in the House of Commons of the UK Parliament since 2024 by James McMurdock, an independent, originally elected for Reform UK.

== Constituency profile ==
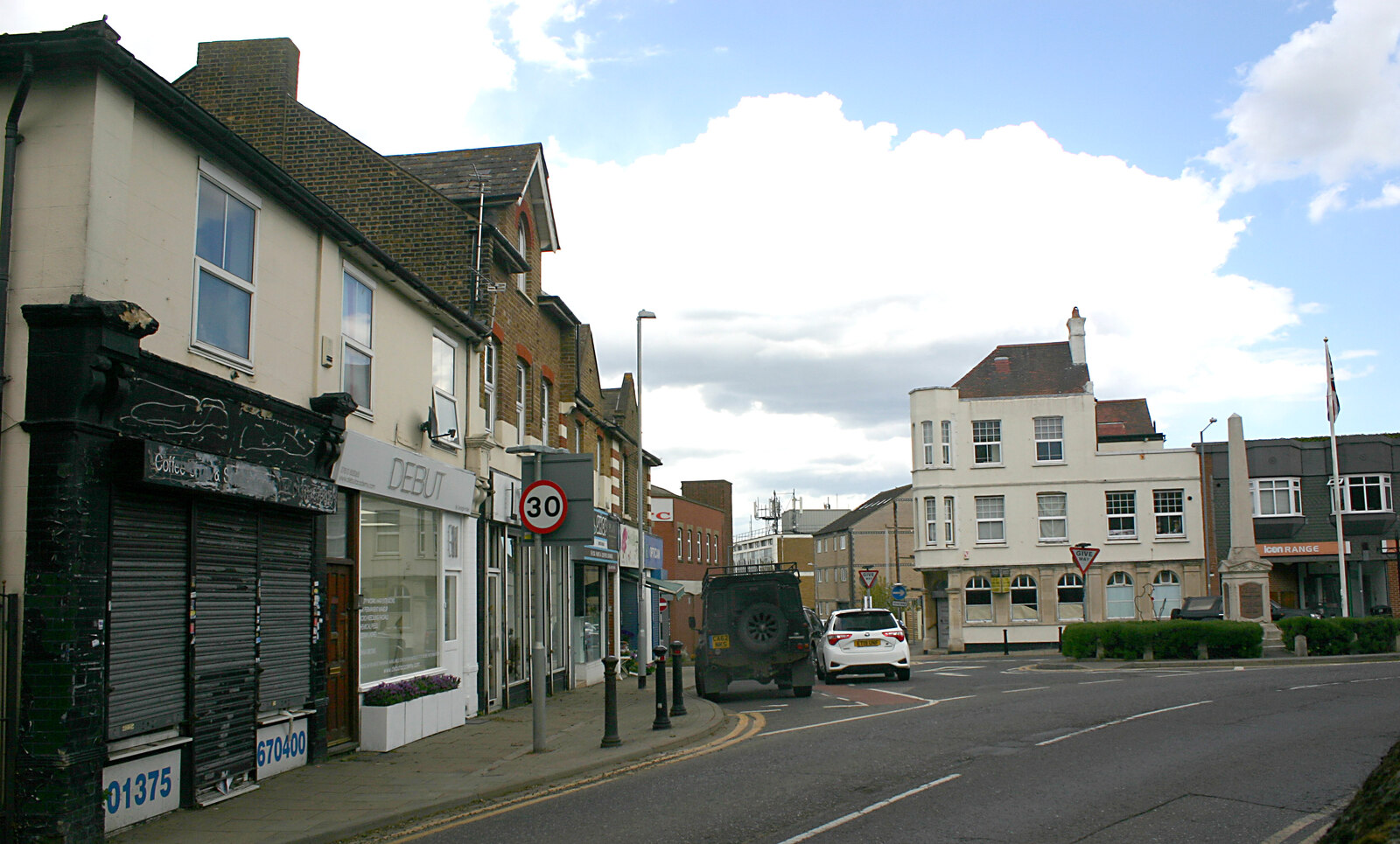
The Green, Stanford-le-Hope

South Basildon and East Thurrock is a constituency in Essex in the East of England, mostly within the Thurrock district and partly within the Borough of Basildon. The constituency covers the southern and eastern neighbourhoods of the large town of Basildon (Langdon Hills, Lee Chapel, Vange and Pitsea), the towns of Corringham and Stanford-le-Hope and the villages of Chadwell St Mary and East Tilbury.

Basildon is a new town that was largely developed after World War II to accommodate London overspill; the Basildon neighbourhoods within this constituency were rural villages until they were absorbed by the town's expansion. Langdon Hills is an affluent suburb with mostly detached houses whilst Pitsea and the eastern suburbs are highly-deprived with a large quantity of socially-rented flats and terraces. Chadwell St Mary also has high levels of deprivation and social housing. Corringham and Stanford-le-Hope are wealthier and mostly consist of semi-detached properties. These towns are located adjacent to London Gateway, one of the UK's busiest ports and a significant local employer. House prices across the constituency are generally similar to the regional and UK averages.

Residents of South Basildon and East Thurrock have a similar age profile to the rest of the country. Residents have average rates of income, homeownership and child poverty. They generally have low levels of education and a high proportion work in the health, construction and transport sectors. The percentage of residents claiming unemployment benefits is in line with the UK-wide rate. White people made up 87% of the population at the 2021 census.

At the local council level, all seats in this constituency are represented by Reform UK. Voters in South Basildon and East Thurrock overwhelmingly supported leaving the European Union in the 2016 referendum. An estimated 73% voted in favour of Brexit compared to the UK-wide figure of 52%; this was the fourth-highest percentage out of 650 constituencies nationwide according to Electoral Calculus.

== History ==
The seat was created for the 2010 general election following a review of the Parliamentary representation of Essex by the Boundary Commission for England. It was formed from the majority of the abolished constituency of Basildon, but excluding the centre of Basildon itself, together with the town of Pitsea from the abolished Billericay constituency.

Before 1974 the area came within the older version of the Billericay constituency and, for just five years before 1950, this area was the eastern part of the Thurrock seat – from 1885 to 1945 the area was within the South East Essex seat. From 1832 to 1885 the area was in the South Essex seat.

Its predecessor seat, Basildon, was a much-referenced bellwether seat, having consistently voted for the most successful party (in terms of number of seats) in each election since its 1974 creation. However, the boundaries of the new South Basildon and East Thurrock seat were considered much more favourable to the Conservatives than those of the old Basildon seat. Accordingly, the seat was held with comfortable majorities by Stephen Metcalfe of the Conservative Party from 2010 to 2024. However, at the 2024 general election, Metcalfe's vote fell by nearly 40% and he was relegated to third place, with James McMurdock of Reform UK (contesting the seat for the first time), capturing the seat with a 0.2% majority over Labour.

== Boundaries ==
Map of boundaries 2010–2024

=== 2010–2024 ===
- The Borough of Thurrock wards of Corringham and Fobbing, East Tilbury, Orsett, Stanford East and Corringham Town, Stanford-le-Hope West, and The Homesteads, and;
- The Borough of Basildon wards of Langdon Hills, Nethermayne, Pitsea North West, Pitsea South East and Vange.

Despite its long name, this new constituency is to the greatest extent the successor to the Basildon constituency.

The Basildon constituency that existed after 1997 was never wholly within the Basildon district, nor even contained the whole of the Basildon urban area, but it extended south into the Thurrock council area to take in towns such as Stanford-le-Hope and Corringham.

This new seat retained all of the Thurrock wards, lost some areas around central Basildon, and replaced them with Pitsea to the east of Basildon. Additionally, the ward of East Tilbury was added from the Thurrock constituency.

=== Current ===
Further to the 2023 review of Westminster constituencies, which came into effect for the 2024 general election, the composition of the constituency was defined as follows (as they existed on 1 December 2020):

- The Borough of Basildon wards of: Langdon Hills; Nethermayne; Pitsea North West; Pitsea South East (polling districts DO, DP, DQ and DR).
- The Borough of Thurrock wards of: Chadwell St. Mary; Corringham and Fobbing; East Tilbury; Orsett; Stanford East and Corringham Town; Stanford-le-Hope West; The Homesteads.

The Borough of Basildon ward of Vange was transferred to Basildon and Billericay, and polling district DN in the Pitsea South East ward (equivalent to the civil parish of Bowers Gifford and North Benfleet) was added to Castle Point. To compensate, the Borough of Thurrock ward of Chadwell St Mary (as it existed on 1 December 2020) was transferred from Thurrock.

Following local government boundary reviews in Basildon (effective from May 2024) and Thurrock (effective from May 2026), the constituency now comprises the following:

- The Borough of Basildon wards of: Langdon Hills; Nethermayne (part); Pitsea North West; Pitsea South East (part).
- The Borough of Thurrock wards of: Chadwell St. Mary; Corringham and Fobbing; East Tilbury, Linford and West Tilbury; Orsett, Horndon and Bulphan; Stanford-le-Hope South; The Homesteads and Stanford-le-Hope North; and a very small part of Little Thurrock Blackshots.

== Members of Parliament ==
Basildon, Billericay and Thurrock prior to 2010

Election	Member	Party
2010	Stephen Metcalfe	Conservative
2024	James McMurdock	Reform
2025	James McMurdock	Independent

== Elections ==
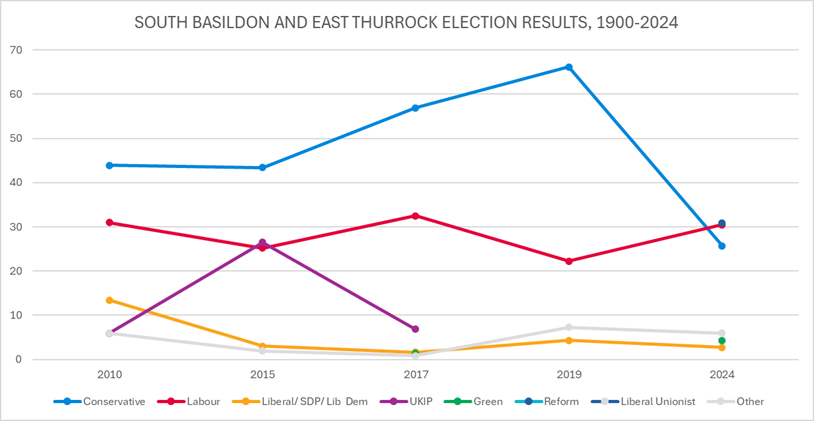
Election results 2010–2024

=== Elections in the 2020s ===
General election 2024: South Basildon and East Thurrock
Party	Candidate	Votes	%	±%
Reform	James McMurdock	12,178	30.8	N/A
Labour	Jack Ferguson	12,080	30.5	+7.0
Conservative	Stephen Metcalfe	10,159	25.7	−39.8
Independent	Neil Speight	1,928	4.9	N/A
Green	Elizabeth Grant	1,718	4.3	+4.2
Liberal Democrats	Dave Thomas	1,071	2.7	−1.4
Independent	Steven Burnett	275	0.7	N/A
SDP	Simon Breedon	140	0.4	N/A
Rejected ballots		123		
Majority		98	0.2	N/A
Turnout		39,549	54.4	−6.6
Registered electors		72,673		
Reform gain from Conservative		Swing	+35.3	

=== Elections in the 2010s ===
2019 notional result
Party	Vote	%
Conservative	29,271	65.4
Labour	10,540	23.6
Others	3,014	6.7
Liberal Democrats	1,836	4.1
Green	68	0.2
Turnout	44,729	61.0
Electorate	73,322	

General election 2019: South Basildon and East Thurrock
Party	Candidate	Votes	%	±%
Conservative	Stephen Metcalfe	29,973	66.2	+9.3
Labour	Jack Ferguson	10,051	22.2	−10.3
Independent	Kerry Smith	3,316	7.3	N/A
Liberal Democrats	Michael Bukola	1,957	4.3	+2.8
Majority		19,922	44.0	+19.6
Turnout		45,297	60.8	−3.2
Registered electors		74,441		
Conservative hold		Swing	+9.8	

General election 2017: South Basildon and East Thurrock
Party	Candidate	Votes	%	±%
Conservative	Stephen Metcalfe	26,811	56.9	+13.5
Labour	Byron Taylor	15,321	32.5	+7.3
UKIP	Peter Whittle	3,193	6.8	−19.8
Liberal Democrats	Nath Banerji	732	1.6	−1.4
Green	Sim Harman	680	1.4	N/A
BNP	Paul Borg	383	0.8	N/A
Rejected ballots		75		
Majority		11,490	24.4	+7.5
Turnout		47,120	64.1	±0.0
Registered electors		73,537		
Conservative hold		Swing	+3.1	

General election 2015: South Basildon and East Thurrock
Party	Candidate	Votes	%	±%
Conservative	Stephen Metcalfe	19,788	43.4	−0.5
UKIP	Ian Luder	12,097	26.5	+20.6
Labour	Mike Le-Surf	11,493	25.2	−5.8
Liberal Democrats	Geoff Williams	1,356	3.0	−10.4
Independent	Kerry Smith	401	0.9	N/A
Independent	None of the Above X (Terry Marsh)	253	0.6	+0.3
Independent	Stuart Hooper	205	0.4	N/A
Majority		7,692	16.9	+4.0
Turnout		45,593	64.1	+1.8
Registered electors		71,155		
Conservative hold		Swing	−10.6	

General election 2010: South Basildon and East Thurrock
Party	Candidate	Votes	%	±%
Conservative	Stephen Metcalfe	19,624	43.9	+3.5
Labour Co-op	Angela Smith*	13,852	31.0	−10.5
Liberal Democrats	Geoff Williams	5,977	13.4	+1.5
UKIP	Kerry Smith	2,639	5.9	N/A
BNP	Chris Roberts	2,518	5.6	N/A
Independent	None of the Above X (Terry Marsh)	125	0.3	N/A
Majority		5,772	12.9	N/A
Turnout		44,735	62.2	+3.3
Registered electors		71,874		
Conservative gain from Labour Co-op		Swing	+7.0	

2005 notional result
Party	Vote	%
Labour	17,364	41.4
Conservative	16,901	40.3
Liberal Democrats	4,959	11.8
Others	2,696	6.4
Turnout	41,920	59.0
Electorate	71,107	

== See also ==
- List of parliamentary constituencies in Essex
- List of parliamentary constituencies in the East of England (region)
