= Harvey Proctor =

British former politician

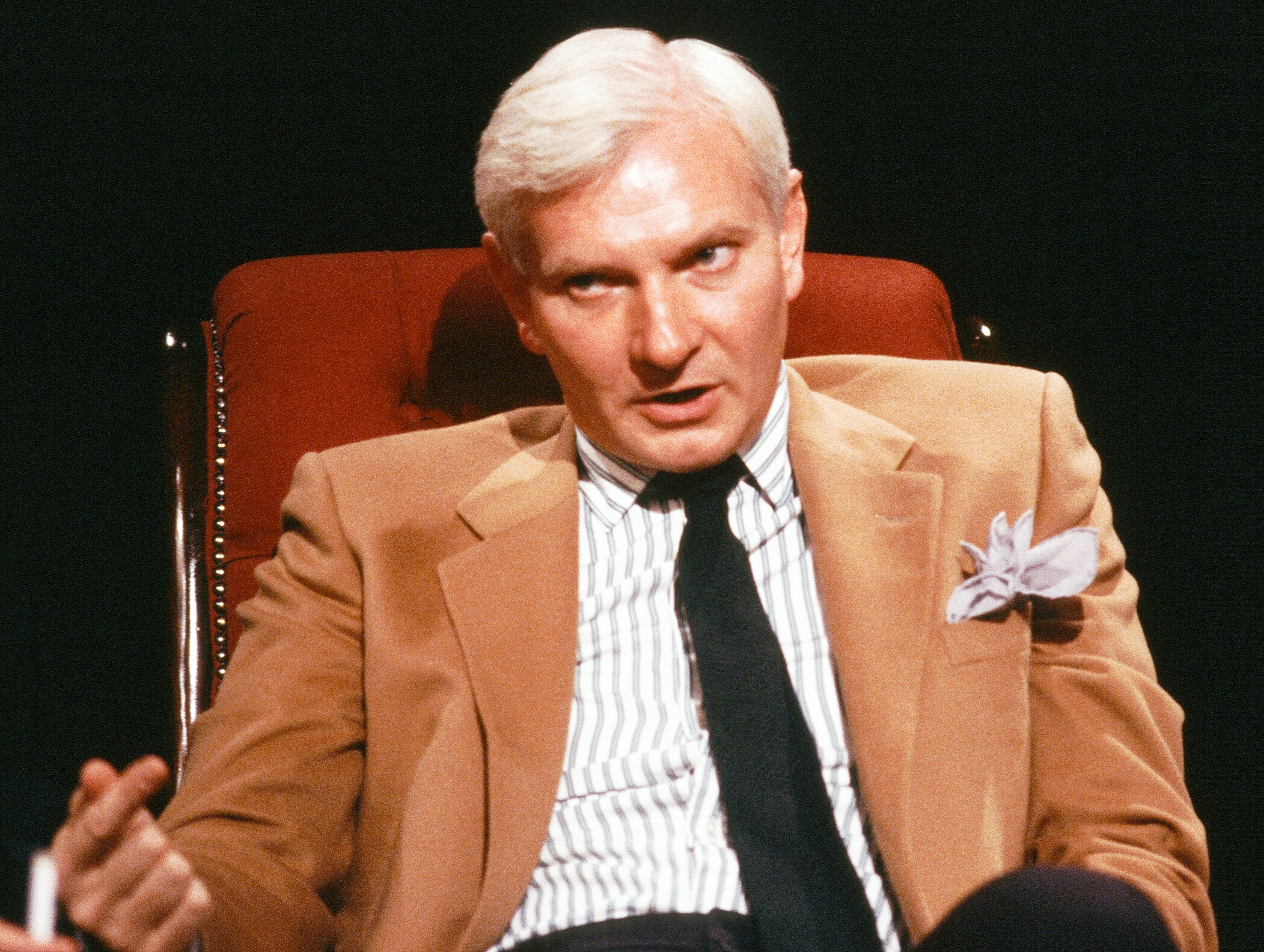
- Proctor in 1988

Member of Parliament
- In office 3 May 1979 – 18 May 1987
- Preceded by: Eric Moonman
- Succeeded by: Teresa Gorman
- Constituency: Basildon (1979–1983); Billericay (1983–1987)

Personal details
- Born: Keith Harvey Proctor; 16 January 1947 (age 79) Pontefract, West Riding of Yorkshire, England
- Party: Conservative

Keith Harvey Proctor (born 16 January 1947) is a British former Conservative Member of Parliament. A member of the Monday Club, he represented Basildon from 1979 to 1983 and Billericay from 1983 to 1987. Proctor became embroiled in a scandal involving sexual relationships with males under 21, which were illegal at the time. This culminated in criminal convictions and ended his parliamentary career.

Proctor was later one of those accused by Carl Beech of being part of an abuse ring, something which he strongly denied. In 2016, the investigations into Proctor concluded and found the accusations to be baseless. He was subsequently paid £900,000 in compensation for victimisation through the botched Operation Midland. His experience has seen him lead efforts to protect those in the public eye from unfair attacks by the media.

== Early life and career ==
Harvey Proctor was born in Pontefract in the West Riding of Yorkshire, going to the Scarborough High School for Boys and then the University of York where he read history. He had joined the Young Conservatives at the age of 14 in 1961, and was chairman of York University Conservative Association from 1967 to 1969. In the summer of 1967, while chairman-elect of the association, he was invited to produce a number of half-hour political programmes for broadcast on offshore Radio 270, which included interviews with MPs John Biggs-Davison and Patrick Wall.

Proctor became an active member of the Monday Club. He was the club's assistant director from 1969 to 1971, and a member of its executive council from 1983 until he stood down as an MP in 1987.

In 1972, Proctor, then working as a researcher for anti-Common Market Conservative MPs who tried to stop Britain entering the European Communities (EC), had been adopted as candidate for Hackney South and Shoreditch. He fought the seat at both the February and October general elections of 1974.

== In parliament ==
Proctor won the selection for Basildon in 1978. The seat was not expected to be easy for the Conservatives to win, but Proctor was elected in the 1979 election after a campaign in which he argued in favour of restricting the number of "coloured" immigrants. He returned to this theme, also advocating payment for repatriation, during his first term in Parliament.

Originally as secretary of the Monday Club's Northern Ireland Policy Committee, he backed calls from MPs of the Ulster Unionist Party (UUP) for Prime Minister Margaret Thatcher to implement her 1979 Conservative manifesto commitment to "establish one or more elected regional councils in Northern Ireland with a wide range of powers over local services" in place of the 1982–86 Northern Ireland Assembly, and also opposed the Anglo-Irish Agreement. This earned him the admiration and support of the UUP leader James Molyneaux (later Lord Molyneaux) and the UUP chief whip, Willie Ross.

Proctor opposed, on libertarian grounds, the call to boycott the Moscow Olympics of 1980. He also opposed establishing the Northern Ireland Assembly in 1982, voted for the return of capital punishment, and rebelled on votes over the EC. In the 1983 election Proctor's seat was divided, and he moved with the more Conservative-voting part to the new Billericay seat.

He was chairman of the Monday Club's Immigration and Repatriation Committee (later renamed, under him, the Immigration and Race Relations Committee). He made a bid for election as the club's chairman in April 1982, but was defeated.

== Resignation and trial ==
In June 1986, The People newspaper published claims that Proctor had taken part in sexual relationships with male prostitutes aged between 17 and 21, in his London flat in exchange for money, and took indecent photos of them with a Polaroid camera. The age of consent for same-sex relationships was still 21 in 1986 (although 16 for opposite sex relationships), no specific legislation existed at the time regarding minimum ages for prostitution and the following year Proctor was charged with gross indecency and resigned his candidature. He was succeeded as MP by Teresa Gorman at the general election. At his trial in May 1987, Proctor pleaded guilty to four acts of gross indecency with a 17-year-old boy and a 19-year-old man and was fined a total of £1,450.

== Shirtmaker ==
Following his resignation, Proctor opened an eponymous shirtmakers, Proctor's, in Richmond, London. The shop was launched with a £75,000 fund organised by Tristan Garel-Jones MP. A second shop was later opened in Knightsbridge. Several Conservative politicians invested in the shop, including Michael Heseltine and Jeffrey Archer, and by 1994 eleven Conservative MPs were shareholders in its parent company, Cottonrose. Proctor's shirts were also worn by the Prime Minister, John Major.

In 1992, Proctor was a victim of a homophobic attack in his shop. Neil Hamilton MP was present at the time, and defended Proctor. Hamilton suffered a broken nose in the incident. Two men were later imprisoned for the assault.

By 1994, the shops were £150,000 in debt. Proctor said that "It has been quite a struggle to survive. It has not been helped by press comment every six months that we are closing down". The shops went into liquidation in 2000.

== Other interests ==
In 2003, Proctor became the private secretary to David Manners, 11th Duke of Rutland, at Belvoir Castle, Leicestershire.

== Operation Midland investigation ==
On 4 March 2015, Proctor's home, on the Belvoir estate, was searched by the Metropolitan Police as part of the Operation Midland investigation into allegations of historical child sexual abuse and related homicides. Proctor denied any wrongdoing in an interview with the Today programme. He retired from his job with the Duke and Duchess of Rutland on 25 March 2015, "with immediate effect".

Proctor was questioned by the police regarding the allegations in June, and again in August 2015. He held a press conference at St Ermin's Hotel, London, on 25 August 2015, and gave several media interviews. He described the inquiry as a "homosexual witch hunt", stating: "I'm a homosexual. I'm not a murderer or a paedophile. I'm completely innocent of all these allegations."

On 21 March 2016, Proctor was told that he would face no further action. He was the last living person under investigation by Operation Midland, and called for an independent inquiry into it, for the resignations of senior officers involved, and for his accuser to be prosecuted for perverting the course of justice. Proctor wrote an open letter to all MPs published in The Daily Telegraph on 21 March 2016. The Metropolitan Police closed Operation Midland with no charges brought and no files passed to the Crown Prosecution Service. Proctor held a further press conference on 29 March 2016 and was interviewed on many news outlets including BBC, ITV, Sky News and Channel 4 News and BBC Newsnight programmes.

Following the publication of Sir Richard Henriques' Report on Operation Midland and other police investigations on 8 November 2016, Sir Bernard Hogan-Howe, the Commissioner of Police of the Metropolis, apologised to Proctor and others for the over 40 mistakes made by the Metropolitan Police service in Operation Midland. He said Proctor was innocent of all the allegations. On 15 November 2016 Hogan-Howe met Proctor at Hogan-Howe's request in Dean's Yard, London and repeated his apology for the MPS's mistakes. Proctor sued the Metropolitan Police in February 2017.

On 10 October 2017, Proctor criticised Mike Veale, the Chief Constable of Wiltshire Police, for allegedly "trashing" his reputation a second time by reviving claims of an establishment paedophile ring. Veale had called for a fresh inquiry into claims of cover-up and conspiracy in Westminster.

In June 2019, Proctor appeared at Newcastle Crown Court where he gave evidence at the trial of Carl Beech, who was accused of lying to police about the alleged VIP paedophile ring investigated by Operation Midland. Proctor said: "The allegations are wrong, malicious, false, horrendous" and later explained that intense media interest, following the police raid, had led to him losing his job and then him deciding to move to Spain as the UK "wasn't safe". At that trial, Beech was convicted for making false claims against Proctor and other victims, and sentenced to 18 years' imprisonment.

In September 2019, Proctor criticised the Independent Office for Police Conduct for clearing the Met officers who investigated allegations made by Beech. Proctor said that "to fail to condemn this police misbehaviour in the strongest terms and at the first opportunity, is a dereliction of duty".

In November 2019, it was reported that Proctor received a £900,000 payout in compensation and legal fees from the Metropolitan Police as a result of the police force's handling of the failed Operation Midland.

== Publications ==
- Immigration, Repatriation, & the C.R.E., by K. Harvey Proctor, MP, John R. Pinniger, MA, with a foreword by Sir Ronald Bell, QC, MP, published by the Monday Club, 1981, (P/B)
- Immigration – An Untenable Situation by K. Harvey Proctor, MP, and John R. Pinniger, MA, Policy Paper from the Monday Club's Immigration and Repatriation Policy Committee, October 1981
- Race Relations & Immigration by K. Harvey Proctor, MP, and John R. Pinniger, MA, Policy Paper from the Monday Club's Immigration & Race Relations Committee, October 1982
- Blackpool Revisited, (calling for an examination of the Immigration issue), in Right Ahead, Monday Club newspaper, October 1985 Conservative Party Conference issue
- Credible and True. The Political and Personal Memoir of K. Harvey Proctor, published in hardback by Biteback Publishing on 29 March 2016

Parliament of the United Kingdom
Preceded by Eric Moonman	Member of Parliament for Basildon; 1979–1983	Succeeded by David Amess
New constituency	Member of Parliament for Billericay; 1983–1987	Succeeded by Teresa Gorman
