= Basildon and Billericay =

UK Parliament constituency (since 2010)

Coordinates: 51.60°N 0.44°E

- Borough constituency for the House of Commons
- Interactive map of boundaries since 2024
- Location within the East of England
- County: Essex
- Population: 89,687 (2011 census)
- Electorate: 76,993 (March 2020)
- Major settlements: Basildon, Billericay, Great Burstead

Current constituency
- Created: 2010
- Member of Parliament: Richard Holden (Conservative)
- Seats: One
- Created from: Basildon, Billericay

Basildon and Billericay (/ˈbæzɪldən ... ˈbɪlərɪki/) is a constituency (Note: A borough constituency (for the purposes of election expenses and type of returning officer)) in Essex represented in the House of Commons of the UK Parliament. Since the 2024 general election it has been represented by Richard Holden, a Conservative. (Note: As with all constituencies, the constituency elects one Member of Parliament (MP) by the first past the post system of election at least every five years.) He was previously the MP for North West Durham from 2019 to 2024. With a majority of just 20 votes, the constituency is the most marginal in the country amongst seats held by the Conservatives.

== Constituency profile ==
The constituency is located in Essex and covers most of the Borough of Basildon local government district. It contains the town of Billericay, most of the town of Basildon, and the rural areas that lie between them.

Basildon is a new town built after World War II to accommodate the London overspill, whilst Billericay is a historic market town. Residents of the constituency have a similar ethnic makeup and level of wealth compared to the rest of the country, but are less likely to be degree-educated. At the most recent borough council election in 2024, voters in Basildon elected mostly Labour Party councillors whilst Billericay and the rural areas of the constituency elected Conservatives. Voters in Basildon and Billericay voted strongly in favour of leaving the European Union in the 2016 referendum, with an estimated 67% supporting Brexit.

== History ==
The seat was created for the 2010 general election following a review of the Parliamentary representation of Essex by the Boundary Commission for England. It combined parts of the separate, now abolished, Basildon and Billericay constituencies.

It has been held throughout its existence by the Conservative Party and, until the 2024 general election, with large majorities.

== Boundaries ==
=== 2010–2024 ===
The Borough of Basildon wards of Billericay East, Billericay West, Burstead, Crouch, Fryerns, Laindon Park, Lee Chapel North and St Martin's.

The seat merged about half of the previous constituency of Billericay with smaller parts of the former Basildon constituency – mostly around the centre of Basildon.

The Billericay constituency lost Wickford to the new Rayleigh and Wickford constituency, and Pitsea to the South Basildon and East Thurrock seat, which also included the remainder of the Basildon seat.

=== Current ===
Further to the 2023 review of Westminster constituencies, which came into effect for the 2024 general election, the composition of the constituency was expanded with the transfer in of the Vange ward (as it existed on 1 December 2020) from South Basildon and East Thurrock.

Following a local government boundary review in Basildon which came into effect in May 2024, the constituency now comprises the following from the 2024 general election:

- The Borough of Basildon wards or part wards of: Billericay East; Billericay West; Burstead; Castledon & Crouch (part); Fryerns; Laindon Park; Lee Chapel North; St Martin's; and small parts of Nethermayne and Pitsea South East.

== Members of Parliament ==
The MP until the dissolution of parliament in May 2024 was the Conservative John Baron, who had held the seat since its creation, but announced in October 2023 that he would be stepping down. His party's choice of the national chairman as its candidate to succeed him was controversially made just 48 hours before the deadline from a shortlist of one, to the anger of the local association.

Election	Member	Party
2010	John Baron	Conservative
2024	Richard Holden	Conservative

== Elections ==
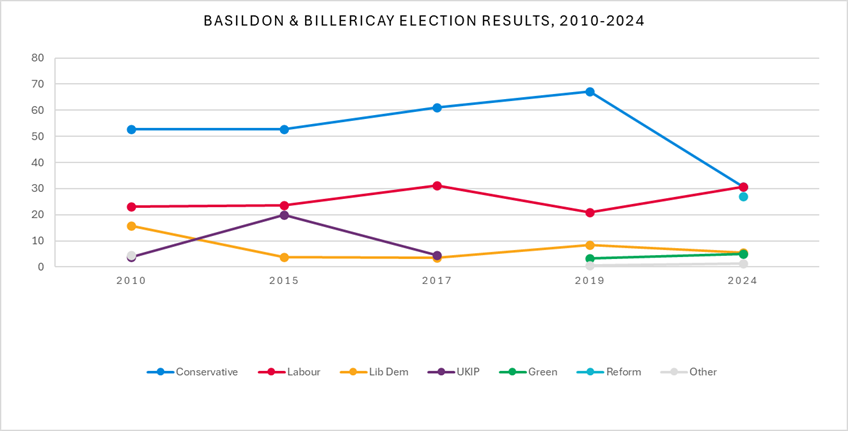
Basildon & Billericay election results 2010–2024

=== Elections in the 2020s ===
General election 2024: Basildon and Billericay
Party	Candidate	Votes	%	±%
Conservative	Richard Holden	12,905	30.64	−35.2
Labour	Alex Harrison	12,885	30.59	+9.0
Reform	Stephen Conlay	11,354	27.0	New
Liberal Democrats	Edward Sainsbury	2,292	5.4	−3.0
Green	Stewart Goshawk	2,123	5.1	+2.1
British Democrats	Christopher Bateman	373	0.9	New
TUSC	Dave Murray	192	0.5	New
Majority		20	0.04	−44.2
Turnout		42,124	54.8	−6.1
Registered electors		76,873		
Conservative hold		Swing	−22.2	

=== Elections in the 2010s ===
2019 notional result
Party	Vote	%
Conservative	30,867	65.9
Labour	10,118	21.6
Liberal Democrats	3,947	8.4
Green	1,395	3.0
Others	526	1.1
Turnout	46,853	60.9
Electorate	76,993	

General election 2019: Basildon and Billericay
Party	Candidate	Votes	%	±%
Conservative	John Baron	29,590	67.1	+6.1
Labour	Andrew Gordon	9,178	20.8	−10.3
Liberal Democrats	Edward Sainsbury	3,741	8.5	+5.0
Green	Stewart Goshawk	1,395	3.2	New
SDP	Simon Breedon	224	0.5	New
Majority		20,412	46.3	+16.4
Turnout		44,128	63.1	−1.8
Registered electors		69,906		
Conservative hold		Swing	+8.2	

General election 2017: Basildon and Billericay
Party	Candidate	Votes	%	±%
Conservative	John Baron	27,381	61.0	+8.3
Labour	Kayte Block	13,981	31.1	+7.5
UKIP	Tina Hughes	2,008	4.5	−15.4
Liberal Democrats	Antonia Harrison	1,548	3.4	−0.4
Majority		13,400	29.8	+0.8
Turnout		44,918	65.0	+0.1
Registered electors		69,149		
Conservative hold		Swing	+0.4	

General election 2015: Basildon and Billericay
Party	Candidate	Votes	%	±%
Conservative	John Baron	22,668	52.7	−0.1
Labour	Gavin Callaghan	10,186	23.7	+0.6
UKIP	George Konstantinidis	8,538	19.8	+16.0
Liberal Democrats	Martin Thompson	1,636	3.8	−11.9
Majority		12,482	29.0	−0.8
Turnout		43,028	64.9	+1.4
Registered electors		66,345		
Conservative hold		Swing	−0.3	

General election 2010: Basildon and Billericay
Party	Candidate	Votes	%	±%
Conservative	John Baron*	21,922	52.7	+10.6
Labour	Allan Davies	9,584	23.1	−9.9
Liberal Democrats	Mike Hibbs	6,538	15.7	+3.4
BNP	Irene Bateman	1,934	4.6	New
UKIP	Alan Broad	1,591	3.8	New
Rejected ballots		114		
Majority		12,338	29.8	+18.6
Turnout		41,629	63.6	+1.3
Registered electors		65,515		
Conservative hold		Swing	+10.2	

* Served as an MP in the 2005–2010 parliament

2005 notional result
Party	Vote	%
Conservative	16,454	42.1
Labour	12,866	32.9
Others	4,901	12.5
Liberal Democrats	4,831	12.4
Turnout	39,052	60.2
Electorate	64,873	

== See also ==
- South Basildon and East Thurrock constituency
- List of parliamentary constituencies in Essex
