= Stephen Metcalfe (politician) =

British Conservative politician

Stephen Metcalfe HonFIET
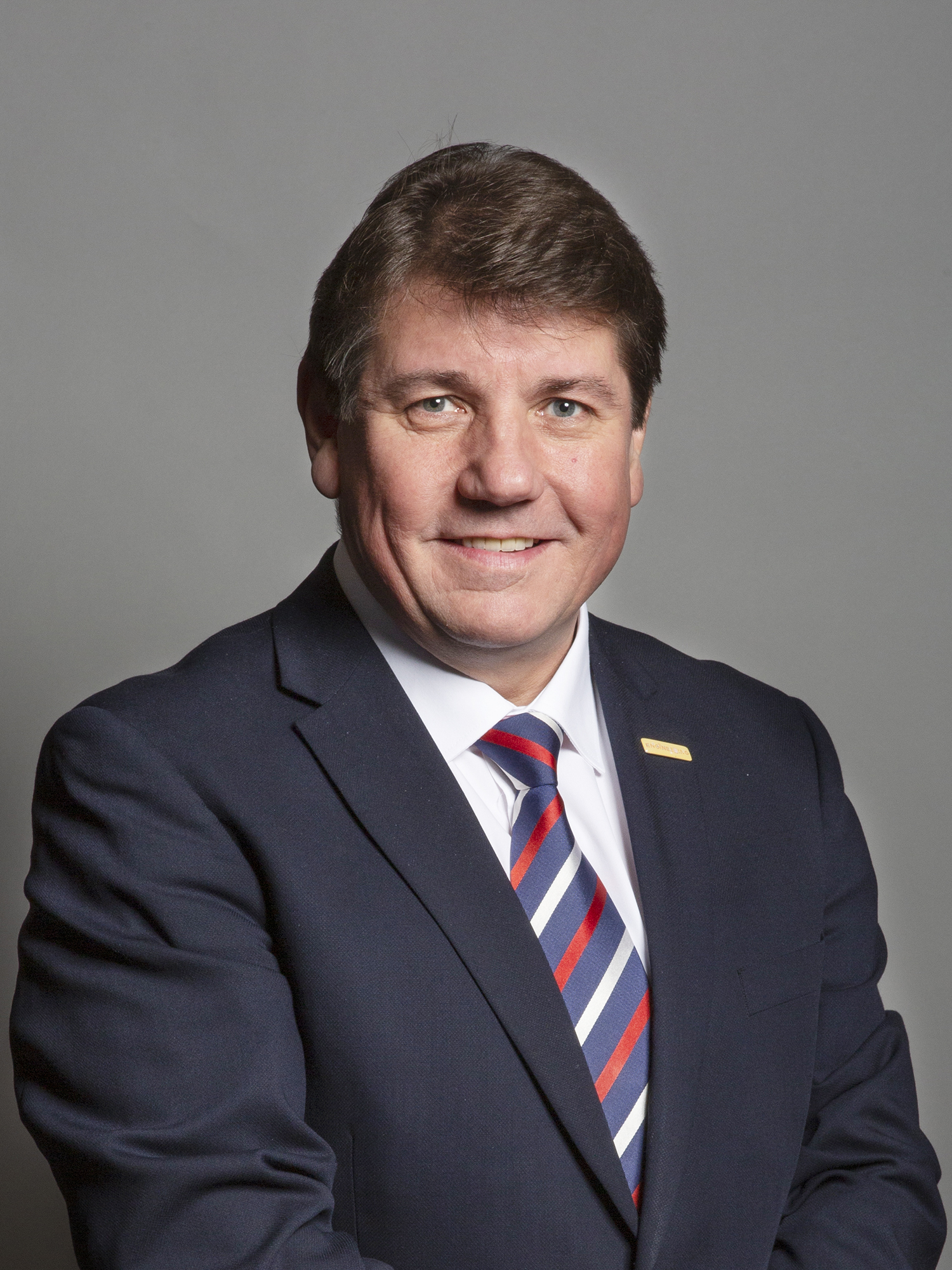
- Official portrait, 2019

Member of Parliament for South Basildon and East Thurrock
- In office 6 May 2010 – 30 May 2024
- Preceded by: Constituency established
- Succeeded by: James McMurdock

Personal details
- Born: 9 January 1966 (age 60) Walthamstow, London, England
- Party: Conservative
- Spouse: Angela Metcalfe
- Children: 2
- Profession: Printer
- Website: Official website

Stephen James Metcalfe (born 9 January 1966) is a Conservative Party politician, who served as the Member of Parliament (MP) for South Basildon and East Thurrock from 2010 to 2024. He sat on the Science, Innovation and Technology Select Committee and served as chair.

== Early life and career ==
Stephen Metcalfe was born on 9 January 1966 in Walthamstow, London. Before becoming an MP, Metcalfe worked in a family printing business.

At the 2005 general election, Metcalfe stood as the Conservative candidate in Ilford South, coming second with 27.2% of the vote behind the incumbent Labour MP Mike Gapes.

Metcalfe was previously an Epping Forest District councilor and portfolio holder for Customer Services, ICT & E-government. As a councilor, he campaigned on green belt protection, traffic calming measures and community engagement.

== Parliamentary career ==
At the 2010 United Kingdom general election, Metcalfe was elected to Parliament as MP for South Basildon and East Thurrock with 43.9% of the vote and a majority of 5,772.

Metcalfe sat on the Science and Technology Select Committee from 2010 to 2019 and served as chair during the years 2016–2017. He was re-selected to serve on the Committee in 2022.

In 2012, Metcalfe was named by Conservative Home as one of a minority of loyal Conservative backbench MPs not to have voted against the government in any significant rebellions or divisions.

At the 2015 general election, Metcalfe was re-elected as MP for South Basildon and Thurrock with a decreased vote share of 43.4% and an increased majority of 7,692.

In June 2016, Metcalfe supported the campaign for the United Kingdom to leave the European Union. His constituency of South Basildon and East Thurrock voted to leave by 73% – the fourth highest percentage in the country.

Metcalfe was again re-elected at the snap 2017 general election, with an increased vote share of 56.9% and an increased majority of 11,490. He was again re-elected at the 2019 general election with an increased vote share of 66.2% and an increased majority of 19,922.

In 2022, Metcalfe introduced a Private Members' Bill – the Powers of Attorney Bill – to the House of Commons. In 2023, the Powers of Attorney Act became law, legislating for a new digitized route for a lasting power of attorney (LPA) application, as well as an improved paper process and increased safety checks.

In 2023, Metcalfe put forward a Ten Minute Rule Motion to make defibrillators an essential feature of every new housing development over 10 dwellings. The Automated External Defibrillators (Housing Developments) Bill was the first such Bill to target the installation of defibrillators in residential homes and addressed the divergence between where defibrillators are located and where sudden cardiac arrests happen. According to the UK's Resuscitation Council, more than 70 percent of out-of-hospital cardiac arrests occur in the home. The bill fell having reached the end of the 2022-23 Parliamentary session without progressing.

In 2024, Metcalfe was appointed Trade Envoy for Panama, Dominican Republic, Costa Rica to enhance the UK-Latin American relationship.

At the 2024 general election, Metcalfe was defeated by Reform UK candidate James McMurdock, finishing 3rd.

== Science and Technology in Parliament ==
Metcalfe sat on the Science and Technology Select Committee from 2010 to 2019 and served as chair from 2016 to 2017. He was re-selected to the Committee in 2022 and served until 2024.

Metcalfe was chair of the Parliamentary and Scientific Committee, an All-Party Parliamentary Group founded in 1939 to increase dialogue between scientists and politicians. Under his direction, it published a quarterly magazine called Science in Parliament.

Metcalfe co-chaired the All-Party Parliamentary Group for Artificial Intelligence (APPG AI) which he co-created in 2017 with Timothy Clement-Jones, Baron Clement-Jones.

Metcalfe is a Director of the Community Interest Company (CIC), Big Bang Education. Big Bang Education organizes the Big Bang Fair in Parliament each year to inspire young people to pursue careers in Science, technology, engineering, and mathematics (STEM). The winners of the Big Bang Competition display their work to MPs in the Terrace Pavilion of the Palace of Westminster.

In 2019, Metcalfe served as an Honorary STEM Ambassador.

In 2018, Metcalfe served as the Government Envoy for the 'Year of Engineering' and attended events across the UK to promote diversity in engineering under the strap line 'Engineering, take a closer look'.

== Awards ==
In 2021, Metcalfe was awarded an Honorary Fellowship by the Institution of Engineering and Technology in recognition of his outstanding contribution to the engineering profession.

In 2017, Metcalfe was awarded for 'Services to Innovation' from the Institute of Innovation & Knowledge Exchange.

Parliament of the United Kingdom
| New constituency | Member of Parliament for South Basildon and East Thurrock; 2010–2024 | Succeeded by James McMurdock |
