= Billericay (constituency) =

UK Parliament constituency (1950–1974, 1983–2010)

- Former county constituency for the House of Commons
- Boundary of Billericay in Essex from 1997–2010.

- Location of Essex within England.
- County: Essex

1983–2010
- Seats: One
- Created from: Basildon, Thurrock
- Replaced by: Basildon and Billericay, South Basildon and East Thurrock, Rayleigh and Wickford

1950–February 1974
- Created from: South East Essex
- Replaced by: Basildon, Brentwood and Ongar

Billericay was a constituency represented in the House of Commons of the Parliament of the United Kingdom. It elected one Member of Parliament (MP) by the first past the post system of election.

== History ==
The seat was first created as a county constituency for the 1950 general election under the Representation of the People Act 1948, as a successor to the abolished seat of South East Essex. The First Periodic Review of Westminster constituencies brought in for the 1955 general election resulted in major boundary changes and it was abolished by the Second Review for the February 1974 general election.

It was re-established for the 1983 general election, with further major changes for the 1997 general election, and abolished once again for the 2010 general election.

Under both versions, the seat returned Conservative MPs at every election except 1966.

== Boundaries and boundary changes ==
Billericay in Essex 1955–1974

Billericay in Essex 1983–1997

1950–1955

- The Urban Districts of Billericay, Benfleet, Canvey Island, and Rayleigh.

Formed from the abolished South-Eastern Division of Essex, excluding the Rural District of Rochford.

1955–1974

- The Urban Districts of Billericay and Brentwood.

Benfleet, Canvey Island and Rayleigh (together with Rochford) now formed the re-established constituency of South East Essex. Billericay was combined with Brentwood, which had previously been included in Romford.

On abolition, the Urban District of Billericay, which had been reconstituted as the Urban District of Basildon, formed the new constituency of Basildon. The Urban District of Brentwood formed the basis for the new constituency of Brentwood and Ongar.

1983–1997

- The District of Basildon wards of Billericay East, Billericay West, Burstead, Laindon, Wickford North, and Wickford South; and
- The Borough of Thurrock wards of Corringham and Fobbing, Orsett, Stanford-le-Hope, and The Homesteads.

Re-established as a County Constituency, formed from northern parts of the constituency of Basildon, including Billericay and Wickford, together with northern parts of the constituency of Thurrock.

1997–2010

- The District of Basildon wards of Billericay East, Billericay West, Burstead, Laindon, Pitsea East, Pitsea West, Wickford North, and Wickford South.

Major realignment of boundaries with Basildon: Pitsea was transferred from Basildon in exchange for the northern part of the Borough of Thurrock.

The seat was abolished once again for the 2010 general election. The majority, comprising Billericay, Burstead and Laindon, was included in the new constituency of Basildon and Billericay; Pitsea was included in the new constituency of South Basildon and East Thurrock; and Wickford was included in the new constituency of Rayleigh and Wickford.

== Members of Parliament ==
Billericay has elected somewhat colourful characters to Westminster, namely Harvey Proctor, the right-wing MP who resigned after homosexual sex charges, and Teresa Gorman, the Maastricht rebel who stood down after accusing the Commons Standards and Privileges committee of sexism over questions surrounding her registered business dealings.

=== MPs 1950–1974 ===
Election	Member	Party	Notes
1950	Bernard Braine	Conservative	Contested South East Essex following redistribution
1955	Richard Body	Conservative	
1959	Edward Gardner	Conservative	
1966	Eric Moonman	Labour	
1970	Robert McCrindle	Conservative	Contested Brentwood and Ongar following redistribution
Feb 1974	constituency abolished: see Basildon and Brentwood and Ongar		

=== MPs 1983–2010 ===
Election	Member	Party	Notes
1983	Harvey Proctor	Conservative	Member for main predecessor seat (1979–1983)
1987	Teresa Gorman	Conservative	
2001	John Baron	Conservative	Contested Basildon and Billericay following redistribution
2010	constituency abolished: see Basildon and Billericay		

== Elections ==
=== Elections in the 1950s ===
General election 1950: Billericay
Party	Candidate	Votes	%
Conservative	Bernard Braine	23,803	50.5
Labour Co-op	Albert Oram	19,437	41.3
Liberal	Sidney Hayden	3,872	8.2
Majority		4,366	9.2
Turnout		47,112	79.6
Registered electors		59,209	
Conservative win (new seat)			

General election 1951: Billericay
Party	Candidate	Votes	%	±%
Conservative	Bernard Braine	26,936	56.7	+6.2
Labour Co-op	Brian Clapham	20,613	43.3	+2.0
Majority		6,323	13.4	+4.2
Turnout		47,549	77.1	+2.5
Registered electors		61,652		
Conservative hold		Swing	+2.0	

General election 1955: Billericay
Party	Candidate	Votes	%	±%
Conservative	Richard Body	24,327	54.7	−2.0
Labour Co-op	Brian Clapham	20,121	45.3	+2.0
Majority		4,206	9.4	−4.0
Turnout		44,448	75.5	−1.6
Registered electors		58,872		
Conservative hold		Swing	−1.9	

General election 1959: Billericay
Party	Candidate	Votes	%	±%
Conservative	Edward Gardner	29,224	46.4	−7.3
Labour Co-op	Rita Smythe	24,402	38.8	−6.5
Liberal	Peter Sheldon-Williams	9,347	14.8	New
Majority		4,822	7.6	−1.8
Turnout		45,626	80.4	+4.9
Registered electors		78,328		
Conservative hold		Swing	−0.4	

=== Elections in the 1960s ===
General election 1964: Billericay
Party	Candidate	Votes	%	±%
Conservative	Edward Gardner	35,347	44.3	−2.1
Labour Co-op	Rita Smythe	33,755	42.3	+3.5
Liberal	Peter Sheldon-Williams	10,706	13.4	−1.4
Majority		1,592	2.0	−5.6
Turnout		79,512	82.5	+2.0
Registered electors		96,762		
Conservative hold		Swing	+2.8	

General election 1966: Billericay
Party	Candidate	Votes	%	±%
Labour	Eric Moonman	40,013	46.5	+4.2
Conservative	Edward Gardner	38,371	44.6	+0.3
Liberal	Lionel Wernick	7,587	8.8	−4.6
Majority		1,642	1.9	N/A
Turnout		85,971	84.1	+1.6
Registered electors		102,198		
Labour gain from Conservative		Swing	+2.0	

=== Elections in the 1970s ===
General election 1970: Billericay
Party	Candidate	Votes	%	±%
Conservative	Robert McCrindle	47,719	52.2	+7.6
Labour	Eric Moonman	43,765	47.8	+1.3
Majority		3,954	4.4	New
Turnout		91,784	74.2	−9.9
Registered electors		123,297		
Conservative gain from Labour		Swing	+3.2	

1979 notional result
Party	Vote	%
Conservative	30,509	57.0
Labour	16,280	30.4
Liberal	5,843	10.9
Others	938	1.8
Turnout	53,570	
Electorate		

=== Elections in the 1980s ===
General election 1983: Billericay
Party	Candidate	Votes	%	±%
Conservative	Harvey Proctor	29,635	53.7	−3.3
Liberal	Patrick Bonner	15,020	27.2	+16.3
Labour	Christopher Sewell	10,528	19.1	−11.3
Majority		14,615	26.5	−0.1
Turnout		55,183	73.8	
Registered electors		74,779		
Conservative hold		Swing	−9.8	

General election 1987: Billericay
Party	Candidate	Votes	%	±%
Conservative	Teresa Gorman	33,741	54.9	+1.2
SDP	Michael Birch	15,755	25.6	−1.6
Labour	Richard Howitt	11,942	19.4	+0.4
Majority		17,986	29.3	+2.8
Turnout		61,438	77.2	+3.5
Registered electors		79,535		
Conservative hold		Swing	+1.4	

=== Elections in the 1990s ===
General election 1992: Billericay
Party	Candidate	Votes	%	±%
Conservative	Teresa Gorman	37,406	56.5	+1.6
Liberal Democrats	Francis Bellard	14,912	22.5	−3.1
Labour	Alison Miller	13,880	21.0	+1.5
Majority		22,494	34.0	+4.7
Turnout		66,198	82.3	+5.1
Registered electors		80,388		
Conservative hold		Swing	+2.3	

1992 notional result
Party	Vote	%
Conservative	34,274	57.6
Liberal Democrats	13,276	22.3
Labour	11,914	20.0
Turnout	59,464	80.7
Electorate	73,644	

General election 1997: Billericay
Party	Candidate	Votes	%	±%
Conservative	Teresa Gorman	22,033	39.8	−17.9
Labour	Paul Richards	20,677	37.3	+17.3
Liberal Democrats	Geoff Williams	8,763	15.8	−6.5
Loyal Conservative	Brian Hughes	3,377	6.1	New
ProLife Alliance	John Buchanan	570	1.0	New
Majority		1,356	2.4	−32.9
Turnout		55,420	72.4	−8.3
Registered electors		76,550		
Conservative hold		Swing	−17.6	

=== Elections in the 2000s ===
General election 2001: Billericay
Party	Candidate	Votes	%	±%
Conservative	John Baron	21,608	47.4	+7.6
Labour	Amanda Campbell	16,595	36.4	−0.9
Liberal Democrats	Francis Bellard	6,323	13.9	−1.9
UKIP	Nicholas Yeomans	1,072	2.4	New
Majority		5,013	11.0	+8.5
Turnout		45,598	58.1	−14.3
Registered electors		78,528		
Conservative hold		Swing	+4.3	

General election 2005: Billericay
Party	Candidate	Votes	%	±%
Conservative	John Baron	25,487	52.2	+4.8
Labour	Anneliese Dodds	14,281	29.2	−7.2
Liberal Democrats	Mike Hibbs	6,471	13.2	−0.6
BNP	Bryn Robinson	1,435	2.9	New
UKIP	Seantino Callaghan	1,184	2.4	+0.1
Majority		11,206	23.0	+11.9
Turnout		48,858	61.4	+3.4
Registered electors		79,537		
Conservative hold		Swing	+6.0	

== See also ==
- List of parliamentary constituencies in Essex
- Billericay
- Laindon
