= Timothy R. Sample =

Timothy R. Sample is the former president of the Intelligence and National Security Alliance (INSA).

== Background ==
Sample joined INSA after a position as the VP for Strategic Intelligence Strategies and Programs at General Dynamics Advanced Informations Systems. He also worked on information processing and telecommunications technologies at GTE Government Systems.

Prior to General Dynamics, Sample had 25 years of experience as both a supplier and user of intelligence, including service as both an intelligence and imagery analyst in the Central Intelligence Agency. His military background includes service in intelligence units within the United States Air Force.

He has also held senior government positions including service as Deputy U.S. Negotiator for the Strategic Arms Reduction Talks (START I) when it was signed in 1991 and the Executive Director of the Central Intelligence Nonproliferation Center. He also served as Staff Director of the House Permanent Select Committee on Intelligence (HPSCI), a position that he held since June 2000.

He is also the co-founder and first President of the Potomac Institute for Policy Studies."
