= Teresa Gorman =

British politician (1931–2015)

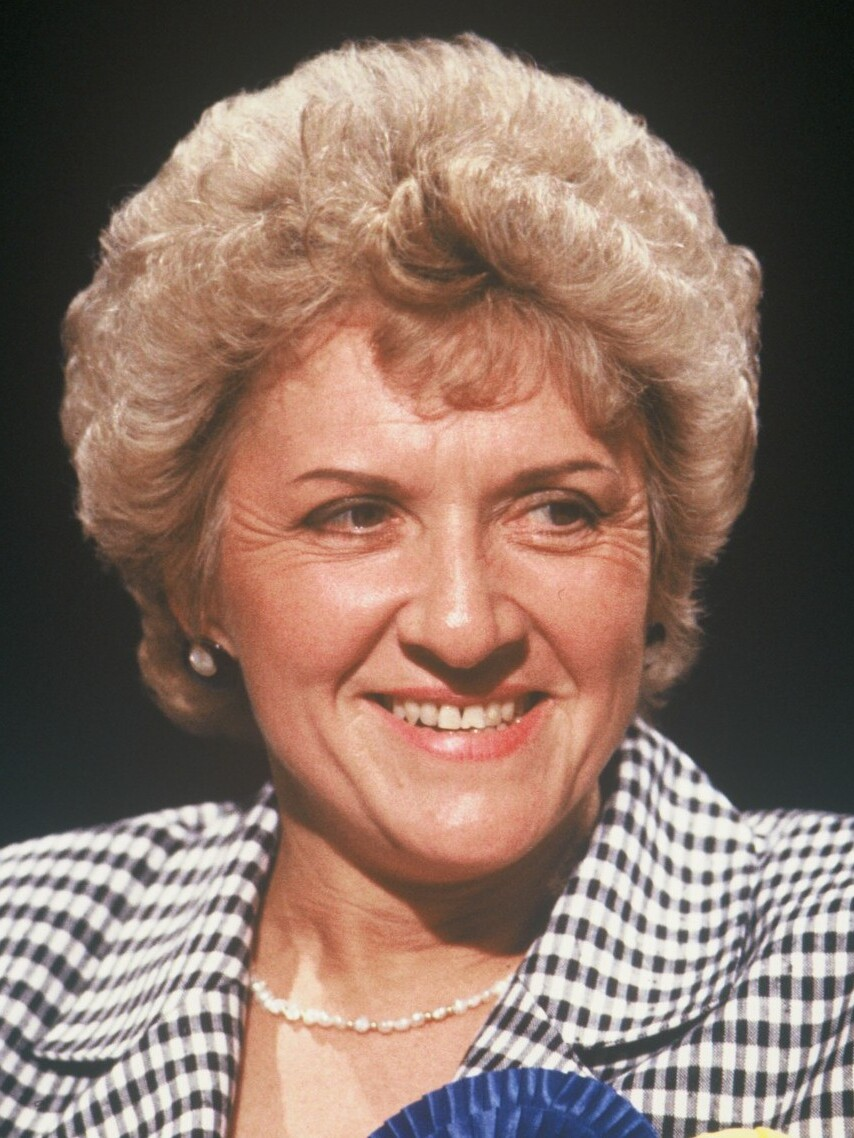
- Appearing on the TV programme After Dark in 1987, the night after she first won her seat

Member of Parliament for Billericay
- In office 11 June 1987 – 14 May 2001
- Preceded by: Harvey Proctor
- Succeeded by: John Baron

Personal details
- Born: Teresa Ellen Moore; 30 September 1931 Putney, London, England
- Died: 28 August 2015 (aged 83) Grays, Essex, England
- Party: Conservative; UKIP
- Spouses: James Gorman (m. 1952; died 2008); Peter Clarke (m. 2010)
- Profession: Politics, teaching, sales, property management

Teresa Ellen Gorman (née Moore; 30 September 1931 – 28 August 2015) was a British politician. She was Conservative Member of Parliament (MP) for Billericay, in the county of Essex, from 1987 to 2001 when she stood down. She was a leading figure in the rebellions over the Maastricht Treaty that nearly brought down John Major's government. She worked in both education and business.

== Early life ==
Gorman was born Teresa Ellen Moore in Putney, London, England. Her father was a demolition contractor, her mother a waitress. She was educated at Fulham County School in London, leaving the all-girls grammar school at 16, at her parents' insistence to start work. She then trained to teach at Brighton Teacher Training College, qualifying in 1951. While working as a teacher, she studied biology and zoology part-time at University College London, graduating with first class honours.

After marrying her first husband, James Gorman, whose surname she would keep throughout her life, she worked on an exchange programme in New York City. Besides teaching she ran a business selling teaching aids, Banta, and was involved in property development with her first husband.

== Political career ==
Under her maiden name Moore, Gorman attempted to enter the House of Commons as an Independent candidate for the Conservative-held seat of Streatham in the October 1974 general election, polling 210 votes. In the same year she founded (and later chaired) the Alliance of Small Firms & Self-Employed People. She later sat as an elected member of Westminster City Council from 1982 to 1986.

Gorman was elected to the House of Commons in the 1987 election. When she sought the candidature for Billericay in 1986, she claimed to have been born in 1941, aged 45, rather than 1931, aged 55, believing this would increase her chances. The night after she was elected she appeared on a notable edition of the Channel 4 late-night discussion programme After Dark when she "stormed off the set".

In the 1990 party leadership election she voted for John Major to succeed Margaret Thatcher but four years later she was one of the Maastricht Rebels, who nearly brought down Major's government over the Maastricht Treaty.

In 1992, Gorman introduced an amendment to the Representation of the People Act under the Ten Minute Rule to give two seats to each constituency, one for a male MP and one for a female. The amendment received only a first reading. She was a prominent figure in the group of Conservative rebels over European issues. In 1994, she had the Conservative whip withdrawn for refusing to back the EC Finance Bill.

At the 1997 general election, there was a massive swing towards her opponent, but she remained an MP, with a much-reduced majority of 1,356. Surprisingly she backed pro-Euro Kenneth Clarke in the 1997 Conservative Party leadership election when she was expected to back William Hague or John Redwood who she backed two years earlier for the party leadership, describing him as "a bad-mannered, insensitive snob whose remarks on single mothers were a disaster".

She tried to stand for the Conservative Mayor of London candidacy for the 2000 London mayoral election, but was blocked by the party leadership.

In February 2000, she was suspended from the House of Commons for a month for failing to disclose on the Register of Members Interests between 1987 and 1994 three rented properties in south London and for her failure to register two rented-out properties in Portugal from 1987 to 1999. The Commons' Standards and Privileges Committee also found she should not have introduced a Ten Minute Rule Bill in 1990 proposing the repeal of the Rent Acts without registering and declaring a financial interest.

Considered an able but maverick politician, Gorman was known for her public endorsement of hormone replacement therapy her tattooed eyebrows (she shaved them off as a teenager and they never grew back) and her belief that rapists should be castrated.

During the 2012 Local elections, it was reported that Gorman was supporting the UK Independence Party in her home area of Thurrock.

Gorman was a council member of the Freedom Association. She was interviewed about her membership of the association and the rise of Thatcherism for the BBC TV documentary series Tory! Tory! Tory! (2006).

=== Censure by the House of Commons Standards & Privileges Committee ===
Gorman was censured by the House of Commons Standards and Privileges Committee for a failure to declare a relevant interest and other breaches of the code of conduct.

The committee found that she failed to declare that her husband Jim Gorman owned three properties in London when she proposed the repeal of the Rents Act. Moreover, during its investigation the privileges committee MPs found she gave "seriously misleading and inaccurate information", breached the code of conduct for members and improperly contacted witnesses. She subsequently announced her resignation from Parliament, although her retirement was also influenced by caring for her husband Jim, who had cancer.

== Personal life ==
Teresa and James Gorman were married on 18 October 1952. He died of cancer in 2008. On her birthday in 2010, she married Peter Clarke, a Scottish widower, who survived her until January 2017. Clarke was a columnist for Private Eye and a wildlife activist.

She had no children. In Who's Who (2014) she did not detail her marital status beyond "married".

Gorman had Alzheimer's disease. She died from end-stage dementia on 28 August 2015 at a nursing home in Grays, Essex, England.

== Publications ==
- Gorman, Teresa, MP, with Heather Kirby, The Bastards – Dirty Tricks and the Challenge to Europe, Pan Macmillan, London, 1993, (P/B), ISBN 0-330-33511-1
- Gorman, Teresa, No, Prime Minister!, Blake Publishing, London, 2001, (H/B), ISBN 1-904034-00-4

Parliament of the United Kingdom
Preceded by Harvey Proctor	Member of Parliament for Billericay; 1987–2001	Succeeded by John Baron
