= Basildon (constituency) =

UK Parliament constituency (1974–2010)

Coordinates: 51.52°N 0.40°E

- Former borough constituency for the House of Commons
- Boundary of Basildon in Essex from 1997-2010.

- Location of Essex within England.
- County: Essex

February 1974–2010
- Seats: One
- Created from: Billericay
- Replaced by: Basildon and Billericay, South Basildon and East Thurrock
- During its existence contributed to new seat(s) of: Billericay

Basildon was a parliamentary constituency represented in the House of Commons of the Parliament of the United Kingdom. It elected one Member of Parliament (MP) by the first past the post system of election.

== History ==
The seat was created for the February 1974 general election from the majority of the abolished constituency of Billericay. Its electorate was reduced for the 1983 general election when Billericay was re-established. It underwent a major redistributions for the 1997 election and again for the 2010 election, when it was renamed as South Basildon and East Thurrock.

Basildon was one of the best known bellwether constituencies in Britain, having voted for the winning party in each election for the duration of its existence. The failure of the Labour Party to win it in the 1992 election — Basildon would be the first to declare of all the marginal seats — foreshadowed Labour's fourth straight defeat at the hands of the Conservative Party.

It was a (famously) Conservative seat between 1979 and 1997 as the quintessential "Essex man" constituency based on the new town of Basildon. Much of its population has its origins in the East End of London, who as a group traditionally voted for the Labour Party.

However, throughout the 1980s and until the Labour landslide victory of 1997, many voters in the area transferred their loyalties to the Conservative Party. The MP throughout that period was David Amess, who himself originated from east London (Plaistow), and later moved to the safer seat of Southend West. New Labour sought to take seats exactly like this one, which were crucial in ensuring they won the 1997 general election by a landslide. Labour took the seat in 1997 and 2001 with a large majority, and in 2005 with a reduced majority.

Both the successor seats that replaced Basildon in 2010 were considered to be much less favourable to Labour than the old Basildon seat, ending Basildon's bellwether status.

== Boundaries and boundary changes ==
Dates	Local authority	Maps	Wards
1974–1983	Borough of Basildon		The Borough of Basildon
1983–1997	Borough of Basildon		Fryerns Central, Fryerns East, Langdon Hills, Lee Chapel North, Nethermayne, Pitsea East, Pitsea West, and Vange.
1997–2010	Borough of Basildon; Borough of Thurrock		Basildon wards of Fryerns Central, Fryerns East, Langdon Hills, Lee Chapel North, Nethermayne, and Vange; Thurrock wards of Corringham and Fobbing, Orsett, Stanford-le-Hope, and The Homesteads.

=== 1974–1983 ===
Formed from the majority of the abolished constituency of Billericay, comprising the former Urban District thereof, which had been reconstituted as the Urban District of Basildon.

=== 1983–1997 ===
Northern parts, including Billericay and Wickford transferred to the re-established constituency of Billericay.

=== 1997–2010 ===
Major realignment of boundaries with Billericay; Pitsea was transferred to Billericay in exchange for the northern part of the Borough of Thurrock.

=== Post 2010 ===
Following their review of parliamentary representation in Essex, the Boundary Commission for England made radical changes to all parliamentary constituencies in the county for the 2010 general election, and the Basildon constituency was divided. The majority of the seat formed the basis of the new South Basildon and East Thurrock constituency, while the wards around central Basildon were merged with the majority of the former Billericay constituency to form a new seat called Basildon and Billericay.

== Members of Parliament ==
Election	Member	Party	Notes
February 1974	Eric Moonman	Labour	
1979	Harvey Proctor	Conservative	Contested Billericay following redistribution
1983	David Amess	Conservative	Contested Southend West following redistribution
1997	Angela Smith	Labour Co-op	Contested South Basildon and East Thurrock following redistribution
2010	constituency abolished: see South Basildon and East Thurrock and Basildon and Billericay		

== Elections ==
=== Elections in the 1970s ===
1970 notional result
Party	Vote	%
Labour	32,200	52.2
Conservative	29,500	47.8
Turnout	61,700	74.1
Electorate	83,276	

General election February 1974: Basildon
Party	Candidate	Votes	%	±%
Labour	Eric Moonman	33,499	45.2	–7.0
Conservative	Ronald Denney	22,832	30.8	–17.0
Liberal	Edward Fortune	17,794	24.0	New
Majority		10,667	14.4	+10.0
Turnout		74,125	82.0	+7.9
Registered electors		90,357		
Labour hold		Swing	+5.0	

General election October 1974: Basildon
Party	Candidate	Votes	%	±%
Labour	Eric Moonman	32,298	47.9	+2.7
Conservative	David Atkinson	21,747	32.2	+1.4
Liberal	Edward Fortune	12,816	19.0	−5.0
Ind. Labour Party	Robert Chaplin	599	0.9	New
Majority		10,551	15.6	+1.3
Turnout		67,460	73.8	−8.2
Registered electors		91,416		
Labour hold		Swing	+0.6	

General election 1979: Basildon
Party	Candidate	Votes	%	±%
Conservative	Harvey Proctor	37,919	46.9	+14.7
Labour	Eric Moonman	32,739	40.5	−7.4
Liberal	Raymond Auvray	9,280	11.5	−7.5
National Front	GA Sawyer	880	1.1	New
Majority		5,180	6.4	N/A
Turnout		79,938	78.0	+4.2
Registered electors		103,595		
Conservative gain from Labour		Swing	+11.0	

1979 notional result
Party	Vote	%
Labour	24,552	52.6
Conservative	16,389	35.1
Liberal	5,267	11.3
Others	500	1.1
Turnout	46,708	
Electorate		

=== Elections in the 1980s ===
General election 1983: Basildon
Party	Candidate	Votes	%	±%
Conservative	David Amess	17,516	38.7	+3.6
Labour Co-op	Julian Fulbrook	16,137	35.6	−16.9
SDP	Sue Slipman	11,634	25.7	+14.4
Majority		1,379	3.0	N/A
Turnout		45,287	69.0	−9.0
Registered electors		69,604		
Conservative gain from Labour (Notional.)		Swing	+10.3	

General election 1987: Basildon
Party	Candidate	Votes	%	±%
Conservative	David Amess	21,858	43.5	+4.9
Labour Co-op	Julian Fulbrook	19,209	38.3	+2.6
Liberal	Raymond Auvray	9,139	18.2	−7.5
Majority		2,649	5.3	+2.3
Turnout		50,206	73.3	+4.8
Registered electors		68,500		
Conservative hold		Swing	+1.1	

=== Elections in the 1990s ===
General election 1992: Basildon
Party	Candidate	Votes	%	±%
Conservative	David Amess	24,159	44.9	+1.4
Labour Co-op	John Potter	22,679	42.2	+3.9
Liberal Democrats	Geoffrey Williams	6,967	12.9	−5.3
Majority		1,480	2.7	−2.6
Turnout		53,805	79.6	+6.3
Registered electors		67,585		
Conservative hold		Swing	−1.3	

1992 notional result
Party	Vote	%
Conservative	27,291	45.1
Labour	24,645	40.7
Liberal Democrats	8,599	14.2
Turnout	60,535	79.4
Electorate	76,236	

General election 1997: Basildon
Party	Candidate	Votes	%	±%
Labour Co-op	Angela Smith	29,646	55.8	+15.1
Conservative	John Baron	16,366	30.8	−14.3
Liberal Democrats	Lindsay Granshaw	4,608	8.7	−5.5
Referendum	Craig Robinson	2,462	4.6	New
Majority		13,280	25.0	N/A
Turnout		53,082	71.7	−7.7
Registered electors		73,989		
Labour Co-op gain from Conservative		Swing	+14.7	

=== Elections in the 2000s ===
General election 2001: Basildon
Party	Candidate	Votes	%	±%
Labour Co-op	Angela Smith	21,551	52.7	−3.1
Conservative	Dominic Schofield	13,813	33.8	+3.0
Liberal Democrats	Jane Smithard	3,691	9.0	+0.3
UKIP	Frank Mallon	1,397	3.4	New
Socialist Alliance	Dick Duane	423	1.0	New
Majority		7,738	18.9	−6.1
Turnout		40,875	55.1	−16.6
Registered electors		74,121		
Labour Co-op hold		Swing	−3.0	

General election 2005: Basildon
Party	Candidate	Votes	%	±%
Labour Co-op	Angela Smith	18,720	43.4	−9.3
Conservative	Aaron Powell	15,578	36.1	+2.3
Liberal Democrats	Martin Thompson	4,473	10.4	+1.3
BNP	Emma Colgate	2,055	4.8	New
UKIP	Alix Blythe	1,143	2.6	−0.8
Green	Vikki Copping	662	1.5	New
English Democrat	Kim Gandy	510	1.2	New
Majority		3,142	7.3	−11.6
Turnout		43,141	58.4	+3.3
Registered electors		73,912		
Labour Co-op hold		Swing	−5.8	

== See also ==
- Parliamentary constituencies in Essex
