= Potomac Institute for Policy Studies =

American public policy research institute

- Formation: 1994
- Headquarters: Washington, D.C.
- CEO: Jennifer Buss
- Website: https://www.potomacinstitute.org/

The Potomac Institute for Policy Studies (PIPS) is an independent, 501(c)(3), not-for-profit public policy research institute located in Arlington, Virginia. The institute was founded in 1994 (32 years ago), shortly after the Congressional Office of Technology Assessment (OTA) was disbanded, with the intent to assume some of the functions formerly performed by OTA.

The Institute focuses on science, technology and national security issues, and describes its mission as the facilitation of non-partisan discussion and debate with the goal of informing public policy. The institute has provided support to the US Congress, the White House, the Department of the Navy, the US Air Force, the National Science Foundation, DARPA, the Department of Homeland Security, other government agencies and private industry.

== Organization ==
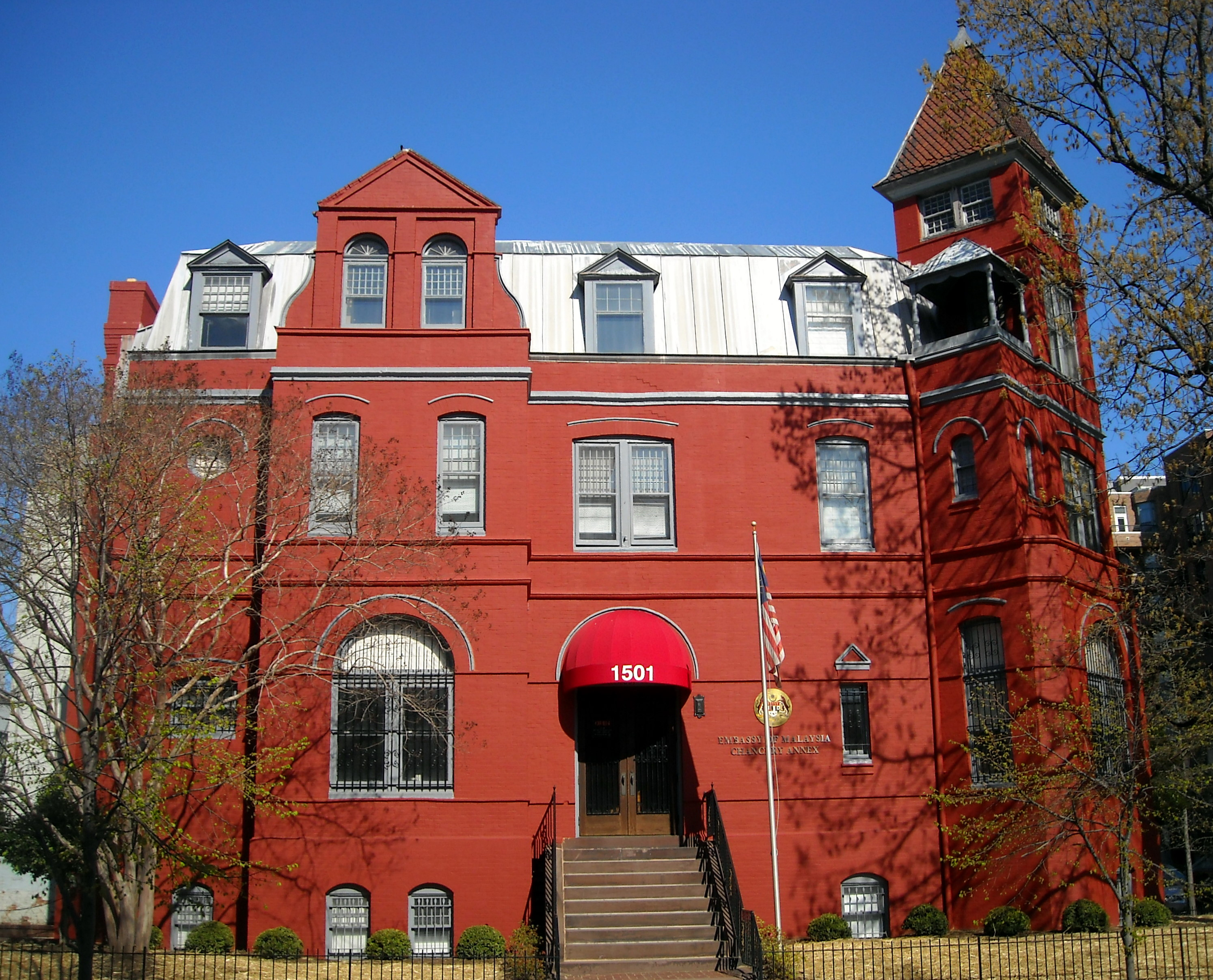
Former offices of PIPS in Dupont Circle, Washington, D.C.

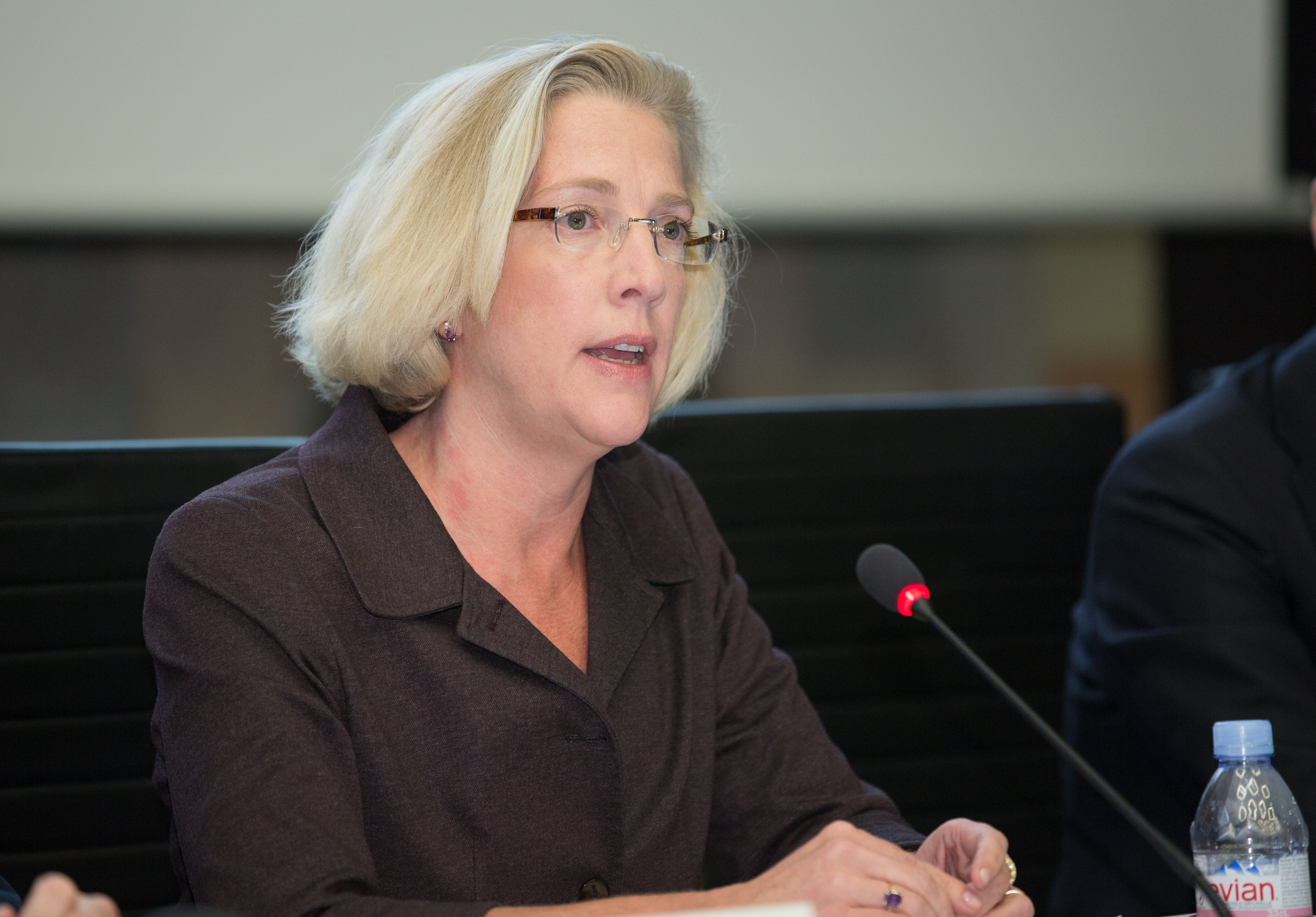
Melissa Hathaway, a regent and senior fellow of the Potomac Institute for Policy Studies, speaks at the World Summit on the Information Society in 2016.

Dr. Jennifer Buss took over as CEO in October 2020. Institute leadership includes co-founder, chairman and former CEO Michael Swetnam, a former Special Consultant to President George H. W. Bush's Foreign Intelligence Advisory Board and current member of the Technical Advisory Group to the United States Senate Select Committee on Intelligence. The institute's Board of Regents is led by General Alfred M. Gray, USMC (Ret.), 29th Commandant of the Marine Corps. Timothy R. Sample is co-founder and the first President.

The institute has four divisions: Policy Research, Strategy & Planning, Concepts & Analyses, and the Center for Emerging Threats and Opportunities (CETO) at the Marine Corps Warfighting Laboratory, Quantico, VA, which serves as an internal Marine Corps think tank. It also hosts Academic Centers, which currently include its Center for Neurotechnology Studies (CNS), Center for Revolutionary Scientific Thought (CReST), Potomac Institute Cyber Center (PICC) and International Center for Terrorism Studies (ICTS). Areas of focus include policy implications of science and technology; science and technology forecasting and trends; terrorism and asymmetry; national health policies; national security; and ethical, legal and social issues in new technology.

== Awards ==
The institute is also the sponsor of the Navigator Awards, honoring science and technology innovators. Winners of the 2010 Navigator Awards Dr. Gerald Edelman, 1972 Nobel laureate and president of The Neurosciences Institute, and Elon Musk, co-founder of PayPal, SpaceX, and Tesla Motors.
