= List of windmills in Essex =

Extant (red) and former (blue) windmills in Essex.
1 Ashdon, 2 Aythorpe Roding, 3 Bocking, 4 Clavering, 5 Debden, 6 Finchingfield, 7 Great Bardfield, 8 Great Dunmow, 9 Fryerning, 10 Mountnessing, 11 Orsett, 12 Ramsey, 13 Rayleigh, 14 South Ockendon, 15 Stansted Mountfitchet, 16 Stock, 17 Terling, 18 Thaxted, 19 Tolleshunt Knights, 20 Toppesfield, 21 White Roding.

A list of all windmills and windmill sites which lie in the current Ceremonial county of Essex.

== Locations ==
=== A ===
Location	Name of mill and grid reference	Type	Maps	First mention or built	Last mention or demise	Photograph
Abbess Roding		Post		1381	1381	
Alphamstone	TL 872 344	Post	1777	c. 1760	1875	
Althorne	TQ 920 977		1825	1825	1825	
Ardleigh	John de Bois Mill; Johnnyboy's Mill; TM 037 281	Post	1777; 1799; 1804	1636	Demolished c. 1805, replaced by new mill on same site.	
Ardleigh	John de Bois Mill; Johnnyboy's Mill; TM 037 281	Post	1805; 1824; 1840; 1893	c. 1805	Demolished 1898	
Ardleigh	Webb's Mill; TM 038 281	Post		1791	1830, possibly moved to Colchester (Old Heath Road)	
Ardleigh	Burnt Heath Mill; TM 068 278	Post		1800	Demolished 1891	
Arkesden	TL 476 343	Post			Gone by 1387	
Arkesden	TL 490 342		1724	1724	1724	
Ashdon		Post		1388	1394	
Ashdon	Church End Mill; TL 580 418	Post	1724; 1777; 1805	1693	Moved to Nuts Green c. 1812	
Ashdon	Bragg's Mill; Bartlow Hamlet Mill; Stevington End Mill; TL 595 425	Post		1757	Windmill World	
Ashdon	Nuts Green Mill; TL 575 413	Post	1825	c. 1812	1839	
Ashdon	Radwinter Road Mill; TL 588 412	Tower	1825	1794	Demolished c. 1900	
Asheldham	TL 972 018		1678	1662	1678	
Asheldham	Approximately; TL 976 012	Post	1825	1825	1876	
Ashen	TL 760 440	Post	1825	1825	1876	
Aveley		Post		1330	1330	
Aveley	(second mill)	Post		1330	1330	
Aveley	TQ 562 807	Post	1678; 1903	1651	Demolished c. 1917	
Aythorpe Roding	TL 590 152	Post	1724	1615	1724	
Aythorpe Roding	Aythorpe Roding Mill; TL 590 152	Post		1779	Windmill World	

=== B ===
Location	Name of mill and grid reference	Type	Maps	First mention or built	Last mention or demise	Photograph
Bardfield Saling	TL 691 220	Post		1823	Demolished 17 September 1965	
Barling	Barling Mill; TQ 931 898	Post	1724	1724	1724	
Barling	Barling Mill; TQ 931 898	Smock		1760	Demolished c. 1946	
Barnston	Barnston Mill; TL 654 201	Post	1777; 1825	1777	Demolished September 1870	
Belchamp Otten		Post		1282	1285	
Belchamp Otten	TL 799 417	Post	1777; 1825	1765	Demolished c. 1881	
Belchamp Otten	TL 798 726	Tower		1838	Demolished c. 1959	
Belchamp St Paul		Post		1222	1222	
Belchamp St Paul	TL 785 416	Post		1815	Demolished 1911	
Belchamp Walter	Cottonbury Mill; TL 798 395	Post	1777	1777	1883, demolished by 1893. Converted to bakery. Trestle inside remaining roundhouse. Windmill World	
Belchamp Walter	TL 808 398			1560	1580	
Belchamp Walter	Orbell's Mill; TL 825 409		1805	1805	1832	
Berden		Post		1274	1432	
Berden	TL 478 302	Post	1678; 1724	1597	1724	
Berden	TL 478 301	Post		1815	1896, gone by 1902	
Birch	Digby's Mill; TL 943 206	Post	1724; 1777	1724	Moved to Layer de la Haye in 1855	
Birch	Royce's Mill; TL 942 191	Post	1825	1786	Demolished 1962	
Birchanger	TL 517 223		1805	1774	1863	
Birdbrook	TL 716 422	Post	1777	1777	Moved c. 1798 (to new site in Birdbrook?)	
Birdbrook	TL 689 382			1555	1555	
Birdbrook	TL 717 416		1805	1805	1805	
Blackmore	TQ 597 999	Post	1777	1777	Burnt down 6 December 1875	
Black Notley	Red Mill; TL 760 123	Post		1785	1840, gone by 1845	
Bobbingworth	TL 530 050			1510	1510	
Bobbingworth	Bovinger Mill; Brock's Mill; TL 522 053	Post	1678; 1724	1640	Blown down 1923	
Bocking		Post		1405	1405	
Bocking	TL 761 233			1617	1624, gone by 1655	
Bocking	TL 761 260	Post	1724	1720	Moved to Bocking Churchstreet 1830	
Bocking	Bocking Churchstreet Mill; TL 763 260	Post		1830	Windmill World	
Bocking	Lambert's Mill; TL 752 232	Post		1752	Moved c 1854 (to Broom Hills, Braintree)	
Bocking	TL 758 235	Post	1724	1685	Standing 1769, replaced by smock mill on same site by 1773	
Bocking	Bocking Tower Mill; TL 758 235	Smock		1773	Burnt down 15 March 1807	
Bocking	TL 758 235	Smock		1823	Moved c. 1829 to Greenstead Green, Halstead	
Bocking	Coggeshall Road Mill; Stock's Mill; Playle's Mill; TL 771 235	Post		1787	Demolished 1876	
Bocking	Pumping mill TL 764 244	Trestle	1875	1914	Demolished by 1911	
Boreham	TL 748 098	Post		1813	Demolished c. 1894	
Boxted	TL 999 314	Post	1825	1815	Demolished c. 1863	
Bradfield	North side of Mill Lane; Approximately; TM 142 307	Post	1678; 1724; 1777; 1825	1678	1832	
Bradfield	South Side of Mill Lane; Approximately; TM 142 307	Post	1825	1825	1838, gone by 1847	
Bradfield	Daniel's Mill; TM 130 296	Smock		1846	Burnt down November 1857	
Bradfield	Pattrick's Mill; TM 132 302	Tower		1845	Demolished 1934	
Bradwell on Sea	TL 994 057	Post		1291	1378	
Bradwell on Sea	TL 994 057	Post	1678; 1700; 1777	1630	Blown down 24 December 1791	
Bradwell on Sea	Curry's Mill; TL 994 057	Smock		1792	Burnt down c. 1900	
Braintree	Griffin's End Mill; TL 752 226	Post		1810	Demolished 1883; Windmill World	
Braintree	Broom Hills Mill; Digby's Mill; TL 747 229	Post		c. 1855	Demolished 1907	
Brightlingsea	Stammer's Mill; TM 093 166	Post		1827	Demolished 1913	
Brightlingsea	Hurst Green Mill; Approximately; TM 093 166	Post		1521	1758	
Broomfield	TL 706 111	Smock		1806	1880	
Broxted	TL 579 271	Post		1815	Demolished c. 1953	
Bulmer		Post		1265	1265	
Bulmer	Armsey Mill; Bulmer Tye Mill; TL 858 397	Post	1777; 1825	1775	Moved to Assington, Suffolk c. 1869	
Bulmer	Bulmer Mill; Ballingdon Mill; TL 861 408	Smock		1793	Demolished August 1928; Windmill World	
Bulphan		Post	1678	1455	1678	
Bulphan	TQ 625 854			1838	1838	
Burnham on Crouch	North Mill; Pannell's Mill; TQ 952 976	Smock	1805	1784	Demolished c. 1900	
Burnham on Crouch	South Mill; Town Mill; Stagg's Mill; TQ 947 959	Post		1796	Demolished c. 1900	
Buttsbury		Post		1259	1259	
Buttsbury	TQ 681 970		1844	1844	1844	

=== C ===
Location	Name of mill and grid reference	Type	Maps	First mention or built	Last mention or demise	Photograph
Canewdon	TQ 890 943	Post	1777	1669	Burnt down c. 1880	
Canewdon	TQ 899 945	Post		1792	1883	
Castle Hedingham	Ruffle's Mill; TL 790 355	Post	1777; 1805; 1825	1765	1878	
Castle Hedingham	Digby's Mill; TL 793 357	Post	1805; 1825	1794	1838	
Chelmsford	Thomas Strutt's Mill; TL 706 076		1724; 1749	1710	1749	
Chelmsford	Moulsham Mill; TL 716 061	Post	1724; 1777	1717	1844	
Chelmsford	TL 705 073	Smock		c. 1810	Moved to new site c. 1824 (Rainsford mill)	
Chelmsford	Rainsford Mill; TL 700 069	Smock		c. 1824	Demolished 1875	
Chelmsford	Widford Mill; TL 694 048	Post		1734	1858	
Chelmsford	pumping mill, River Chelmer					
Chignall Smealy	TL 675 113	Post		1333	1333	
Chigwell		Post		1318	1318	
Chigwell	Chigwell Row Mill; TQ 456 928	Post	1768	c. 1610	1768	
Chigwell	Chigwell Row Mill; TQ 456 928	Post		1773	Burnt down July 1842	
Chigwell	Mount Pleasant Mill; TQ 443 923		1825	1813	1829	
Chipping Ongar	TQ 553 057	Post		1294	1372	
Chrishall	Crawley End Mill; TL 446 043	Post	1724	1724	Demolished c. 1890	
Clavering	Clavering Windmill; TL 465 326	Post	1724	1625	1848	
Clavering	South Mill; TL 465 326	Tower		1757	Windmill World	
Clavering	North Mill; TL 465 328	Tower		1811	Windmill World	
Colchester	Lexden Road Mill (east); TL 987 250	Post	1678; 1777	1678	1819	
Colchester	Lexden Road Mill (west); TL 983 250	Post	1678; 1777	1678	1832	
Colchester	Butt Mill; TL 992 247	Post	1724; 1767; 1777	1660	Demolished c. 1782	
Colchester	Butt Mill; TL 992 247	Post		1782	Burnt down 29 March 1787	
Colchester	Butt Mill; TL 992 247	Post		1793	Demolished c. 1881	
Colchester	Mersea Road Mill; TL 999 245	Post	1724; 1767; 1777	1724	Demolished 1813	
Colchester	Mersea Road Mill; TL 999 245	Tower		1813	Demolished 1859	
Colchester	Military Road Mill; TM 002 245	Post		1724	Demolished 1862	
Colchester	Golden Noble Hill Mill (south); Middle Mill; TM 001 245	Post		1699	Moved to new site on Golden Noble Hill 1838	
Colchester	Golden Noble Hill Mill (north); TM 001 246	Post		1838	Demolished 1862	
Colchester	Old Heath Road Mill	Post		1774	Blown down 11 June 1834	
Colchester	Magdalen Green Mill; TM 006 247	Post		1801	1813, possibly moved to Shrub End 1820	
Colchester	Distillery Mill; TM 016 238	Tower	1777; 1893	1748	1893, gone by 1896	
Colchester	St Ann's Mill; TM 011 256		1678	1579	1678, gone by 1683	
Colchester	St Ann's Mill; TM 011 256	Post	1724	1683	Burnt down June 1767	
Colchester	St Ann's Mill; TM 011 256	Tower		1767	1865	
Colchester	Mile End Mill (east); TL 998 281	Post	1777	1764	Burnt down May 1807	
Colchester	Mile End Mill (east); TL 998 281	Post		1807	1896	
Colchester	Mile End Mill (west); TL 990 278	Post	1777	1777	1779, gone by 1806	
Colchester	Shrub End Mill; Bottle End Mill; TL 997 234	Post		1820	Demolished 1871	
Colchester	Greenstead Mill; TM 018 247	Post	1777	1784	Demolished c. 1907	
Colchester	Scarlett's Mill; TM 012 240		1724; 1777	1706	1800, possibly moved to Magdalen Green	
Colchester	ApproximatelyTL 995 260		1724	1724	1724	
Colchester	Clubb's Mill; TL 993 257	Trestle		1832	Blown down December 1836	
Colchester	Clubb's Mill; TL 993 257	Smock		1838	Blown down July 1852	
Colchester	Old Heath Mill			1774	1780, possibly moved to Greenstead Mill	
Colchester	East Bridge Mill			1795	Blown down November 1795	
Colchester	Dunnages Mill			1833	Blown down June 1833	
Colchester	Colchester Castle	Horizontal		1834	1834	
Colchester	Brickfield (unknown exactly where)	Hollow post		c. 1890	c. 1890	
Colchester	Oil Mill, St. Mary's			1656	1716	
Colne Engaine	TL 836 297	Tower		1880	Demolished c. 1921	
Copford	Copford Mill; TL 932 241	Post	1724; 1777	1724	Demolished c. 1900	
Cressing	Phillip's Mill; TL 778 204	Post	1777	1777	Demolished c. 1900	

=== D ===
Location	Name of mill and grid reference	Type	Maps	First mention or built	Last mention or demise	Photograph
Danbury	Runsell Common Mill (east); TL 789 051	Post	1825; 1844	1733	demolished c. 1897	
Danbury	Runsell Common Mill (west)TL 789 051		1825; 1844	1825	1856, gone by 1858	
Danbury	TL 788 049					
Debden	Tendering's Mill; TL 575 318		1724; 1777	1660	1777	
Debden	Debden Green Mill; TL 554 336	Post		1719	Demolished c. 1920	
Debden	TL 555 336	Post	1724; 1777	1724	Demolished c. 1796	
Debden	Debden Windmill; TL 555 336	Tower		1796	Windmill World	
Dengie	Drainage mill			1842	1842	
Dovercourt		Post		1353	1353	
Dovercourt	Beacon Hill Mill; TM 261 319	Post		1514	Blown down 20 January 1606	
Dovercourt	Beacon Hill Mill; TM 261 319	Post	1724	1606	Struck by lightning and demolished 26 June 1728	
Dovercourt	Beacon Hill Mill; TM 261 319	Post	1777	1777	1777, gone by 1805	
Dovercourt	Mill Hill Mill (north west); TM 253 316	Post		1763	1793	
Dovercourt	Mill Hill Mill (south east); Taylor's Mill; Pattrick's Mill; TM 254 317	Post		1821	1864, gone by 1875	
Dovercourt	Pattrick's Mill; TM 257 313	Post	1777; 1825; 1836	1777	Moved to new site in 1829	
Dovercourt	Pattrick's mill TM 253 312	Post		1829	1866	

=== E ===
Location	Name of mill and grid reference	Type	Maps	First mention or built	Last mention or demise	Photograph
Earls Colne			1678	1678	1678	
East Horndon	TQ 692 913	Post	1777	1736	Moved to Ingrave, May 1786	
East Horndon	TQ 635 883	Post	1903	1832	Demolished c. 1905	
East Tilbury		Post		1266	1266	
East Tilbury	TQ 686 789	Smock		1862	Demolished c. 1939	
East Tilbury	Muckingford Mill; TQ 676 790			1839	1843, gone by 1862	
Elmdon		Post		1300	1315	
Elmstead	Elmstead Mill; TM 043 220	Post	1678; 1725; 1777; 1805	1660	1810	
Elsenham		Titt iron wind engine				
Epping	TL 445 048	Post		1303	1635	
Epping	Epping Mill; Eagle's Mill; TL 449 012	Post		1582	1862	

=== F ===
Location	Name of mill and grid reference	Type	Maps	First mention or built	Last mention or demise	Photograph
Farnham	TL 466 254	Post	1825	1574	Demolished 1807	
Feering			1678	1678		
Felsted	Cock Green Mill; TL 697 198	Post	1777	1772	Demolished c. 1916	
Felsted	Felsted Common Mill; TL 723 218	Post	1777	1684	1845, moved to new site by 1875	
Felsted	Felsted Common Mill; TL 723 217	Post		1875	Demolished c. 1919	
Finchingfield		Post		1254	1495	
Finchingfield	Duck End Mill; TL 687 329	Post	1777	1756	Windmill World	
Finghingfield	TL 703 341		1777	1777	1777	
Finchingfield	TL 702 352	Post	1777; 1805	1766	Demolished c. 1817	
Finchingfield	TL 690 323			1580	1580	
Finchingfield	Parsonage Lane Mill; Daw Street Mill; TL 690 323	Post	1825	1787	Demolished c. 1914	
Finchingfield	Monk's Mill; TL 686 379	Post		1822	Demolished c. 1916	
Finchingfield	TL 686 379	Post	1825	1790	Demolished c. 1826	
Finchingfield	Jekyll's Farm Mill; TL 691 357			1814	1814	
Fingringhoe	East Fingringhoe Mill; TM 039 210		1724; 1777	1723	1777	
Fingringhoe	Stammer's Mill; TM 031 205	Post	1825	1788	Moved to Brightlingsea 1827	
Fobbing	TQ 715 845	Post		1557	1899	
Fordham	TL 943 261	Post	1893	1836	1893	
Foulness	TR 003 929	Post		1802	1914, gone by 1918	
Foxearth	TL 833 443	Post	1825	1817	Demolished 1868	
Fyfield		Post		1280	1280	
Fyfield	TL 569 066	Post	1678; 1724	1678	Blown down 1912	

=== G ===
Location	Name of mill and grid reference	Type	Maps	First mention or built	Last mention or demise	Photograph
Goldhanger	TL 905 087			1781	1875	
Good Easter	Hockley's Mill; TL 624 123	Post	1777	1769	1878, gone by 1886	
Good Easter	Everett's Mill; TL 626 124	Smock		1815	Demolished c. 1910	
Gosfield		Post		1266	1266	
Gosfield	TL 786 289		1777	1775	1777, gone by 1799	
Grays Thurrock	TQ 615 774	Post	1724	1624	1739	
Great Baddow	Barnes Mill; TL 726 065	Post	1825; 1874	1792	1876	
Great Baddow	Upper Mill; TL 703 027	Post		1602	Replaced by smock mill on same site c. 1827	
Great Baddow	Upper Mill; Sewell's Mill; TL 703 027	Smock		c. 1827	Demolished February 1923	
Great Baddow	Lower Mill; Steven's mill TL 070 026	Smock		1826	1888	
Great Bardfield		Post		1298	1384	
Great Bardfield	Gibraltar Mill; TL 681 307	Tower	1724; 1777	1704	Windmill World	
Great Bardfield	Park Hall Farm Mill	Post		1841	1856	
Great Bentley	TM 112 219	Post		1755	Demolished 1891	
Great Bromley	TM 075 246	Post	1724; 1777	1724	Demolished 1895	
Great Burstead	Bell Hill Mill (east); TQ 678 939	Post	1724; 1777; 1805; 1903	1537	Collapsed December 1928; Windmill World	
Great Burstead	Bell Hill Mill (west); TQ 676 939	Post	1777; 1805; 1903	1777	Demolished c. 1892	
Great Burstead	Outwood Farm Mill; TQ 693 946	Post		1835	1859	
Great Canfield	TL 785 178	Post		1386	1424	
Great Canfield		Post		1676	1797, gone by 1826	
Great Canfield		Post		1826	Demolished 1916	
Great Chesterford	West Mill; TL 506 437	Smock	1825; 1836; 1893; 1905	1825	Demolished 21 October 1909	
Great Chesterford	East Mill; TL 507 437	Smock	1836	1836	1886, gone by 1893	
Great Clacton	Bull Hill Farm Mill; TM 178 162	Post		1807	1807, possibly moved to new site in Great Clacton by 1824	
Great Clacton	TM 176 163	Post	1824	1824	Demolished c. 1918	
Great Coggeshall	TL 843 227		Post		Gone by 1376	
Great Coggeshall	Thompson's Mill; TL 858 229	Post	1777	1734	1833	
Great Coggeshall	New Mill; Prior's Mill; TL 856 223	Post		1802	1828	
Great Coggeshall	Tilkey Mill (south); TL 848 230	Post		1778	Demolished c. 1823	
Great Coggeshall	Tilkey Mill (north); TL 848 230	Post		1820	Burnt down 4 March 1879	
Great Dunmow	Stowles Green Mill; TL 632 212	Post	1724	1661	Moved to Widford 1734	
Great Dunmow	Dunmow Down Mill; TL 625 224	Post		1730	Demolished c. 1807	
Great Dunmow	Royal Oak Mill; TL 624 218	Post	1777; 1805; 1825	1777	1825	
Great Dunmow	Joe Lambert's Mill; Town Mill; TL 629 216	Smock		1807	Demolished 1896	
Great Dunmow	Church End Mill; TL 633 226	Tower		1822	Windmill World	
Great Easton	TL 614 260	Post	1777	1752	Demolished 1915	
Great Henny	TL 877 383	Post	1805	1792	1811	
Great Holland		Post		1291	1294	
Great Holland	TM 203 193			1714	Demolished 1839	
Great Holland	TM 203 193	Smock		1840	Demolished 1952; Windmill World	
Great Horkesley	TL 978 310	Post	1825	1821	Demolished 1870	
Great Maplestead	TL 813 337			1765	1765	
Great Leighs	TL 737 176	Post	1724; 1777	1616	Demolished c. 1912	
Great Oakley	TM 196 277	Post	1678; 1724	1678	Demolished c. 1904	
Great Oakley		Post		1802	Demolished July 1821	
Great Saling				c. 1547	c. 1547	
Great Sampford		Post		1288	1288	
Great Sampford	Sparepenny Lane Mill; TL 642 358	Post	1825	1803	1890	
Great Sampford	Pettit's Mill; Day's Mill; TL 643 355	Smock		1817	Demolished c. 1914; Windmill World	
Great Tey		Post		1328	1328	
Great Tey	Tey Hall Green Mill; TL 887 264		1777	1740	1782, gone by 1795	
Great Tey	Sparke's Mill; Sach's Mill; TL 890 259	Post		1792	Burnt down, January 1860	
Great Totham	Brown's Mill; TL 858 117	Post	1724	1718	Demolished 1911	
Great Totham	TL 869 132	Post		1815	1822	
Great Totham	Frost's Mill; Pulford's Mill; King's Mill; TL 869 122	Smock		1817	Demolished 1911	
Great Waltham	Chatham Green Mill; TL 7159 1515	Post		1829	Demolished c. 1902, roundhouse survives as of 2026. Windmill World	
Great Waltham	Ford End Mill; TL 679 167	Post		1812	1813, moved to Chatham Green 1829?	
Great Yeldham	TL 762 394	Post	1678; 1825	1524	1844	
Greenstead		Post		1349	1349	

=== H ===
Location	Name of mill and grid reference	Type	Maps	First mention or built	Last mention or demise	Photograph
Hadstock	TL 567 441	Post	1777	1773	Demolished 1836	
Hadstock	TL 567 441	Tower		1836	Demolished 1926	
Halstead	West Mill; TL 806 304	Post	1724; 1805	1701	Struck by lightning 22 August 1800 and subsequently demolished	
Halstead	Box Mill; TL 809 312	Post	1777	1775	Blown down 29 April 1882	
Halstead	East Mill; TL 819 308	Post		1841	1876	
Halstead	East Mill; TL 819 308	Smock		1800	Burnt down 24 December 1862	
Halstead	Greenstead Green Mill; TL 822 282	Post		1784	Demolished c. 1830	
Halstead	Greenstead Green Mill; TL 822 282	Smock		1830	1939, gone by 1945	
Halstead	Bois Hall Mill; TL 815 310	Post	1724	1724	1770	
Halstead	Frost's Mill; North Mill; TL 815 310	Smock		c. 1790	Demolished 1947; Windmill World	
Halstead	Approximately TL 802 313		1724	1682	1736	
Harlow		Post		1287	1343	
Harlow	Foster Street Mill; TL 487 088	Post	1805; 1825	1799	1874	
Harlow	Potter Street Mill; TL 472 092	Post	1825	1825	Demolished 1891	
Harlow	John Barnard's Mill; TL 473 126		1825	1825	1828, gone by 1831	
Hatfield Broad Oak	TL 551 168	Post		Before 1216	1633	
Hatfield Broad Oak	Town Mill; TL 540 166	Post		1530	1547	
Hatfield Broad Oak	Town Mill; TL 540 166	Post	1724; 1777; 1825	1683	Blown down 26 October 1881	
Hatfield Broad Oak		Post		1443		
Hatfield Broad Oak	Hatfield Heath Mill		1678	1678		
Hatfield Broad Oak	Down Hall Mill; TL 525 131	Post	1777	1715	1777, moved to Matching by 1799	
Hatfield Broad Oak	Hatfield Heath Mill; Merchaw's Mill; Mawkhaw's Mill; TL 524 128	Tower		1838	Demolished 1909	
Hatfield Peverel	TL 794 113	Post		1320	1320	
Hatfield Peverel	Gardener's Mill; Hatfield Mill; TL 788 099	Smock		1824	Demolished 1842	
Hazeleigh	TL 822 038	Post	1724; 1777	1724	Blown down 28 April 1892	
Helions Bumpstead		Post		1289	1349	
Helions Bumpstead	TL 654 471	Tower	1749; 1777; 1805	1749	Demolished c. 1900	
Hempstead	TL 634 378	Post	1678	1615	1678	
Hempstead	TL 634 378	Post		1845	1898, gone by 1912	
Henham		Post		1202	1328	
Henham	TL 544 275	Post	1678; 1896	1678	Demolished December 1902	
Heybridge	Two pumping windmills, Approximately TL 874 074			1825	1825	
Heydon				1630	1630	
High Easter	Fuller's Mill; Webster's Mill; Shead's Mill; Welford's Mill; TL 618 144	Post	1777	1680	Demolished 1936; Windmill World	
High Garrett	Pumping mill TL 778 271		1904	1875	1914	
High Ongar				1586	1586	
High Ongar	TL 566 032	Smock	1724; 1777	1706	Demolished 1897; Windmill World	
High Roding		Post		1386	1386	
High Roding	TL 606 177	Post	1805	1797	Demolished c. 1911	
Hockley		Post		1295	1295	
Hockley	TQ 827 933			1590	1687	
Horndon on the Hill		Post		1286	1286	
Horndon on the Hill	TQ 663 834	Post	1805	1799	1805	
Horndon on the Hill	TQ 668 833	Post		1826	Demolished 1917; Windmill World	

=== I, K ===
Location	Name of mill and grid reference	Type	Maps	First mention or built	Last mention or demise	Photograph
Ingatestone	TL 639 007	Post		1564	1753	
Ingatestone	Mill Green Mill, Fryerning; TL 639 007	Post	1777	1759	Windmill World	
Ingrave	TQ 627 913	Post		1791	1826, Moved to East Horndon by 1832	
Kelvedon		Post		1294	1294	
Kelvedon	TL 859 197	Smock	1805	1784	Demolished c. 1875	
Kelvedon Hatch	Purkis’ Mill; TQ 572 988	Smock		1768	Demolished 1920	
Kirby le Soken	TM 210 210			c. 1837	1890, gone by 1893	

=== L ===
Location	Name of mill and grid reference	Type	Maps	First mention or built	Last mention or demise	Photograph
Laindon	TQ 680 890		1678	1617	1695	
Lamarsh	TL 893 342	Smock	1825	1825	1876	
Langham	TM 031 327	Post	1805	1800	Moved to new site in Langham 1800	
Langham	TM 037 329	Post	1805	1800	1803, gone by 1817	
Langham	Whiley's Mill; TM 014 323	Smock		1819	Demolished 1907	
Latchingdon	TL 889 013	Post		1310	1310	
Latchingdon	Lawland Mill; TL 889 013	Post	1678; 1724; 1777	1633	1807	
Latchingdon	TL 887 969			1873	1873	
Latton					Gone by 1616	
Latton	Latton Mill; TL 460 119		1825	1824	1835, demolished to enable construction of London – Cambridge railway	
Lawford	TM 105 320	Post		1804	1816, gone by 1824	
Lawford	TM 102 315	Tower	1825	1783	1914, gone by 1918	
Lawford	TM 095 333	Post	1825	1802	1825	
Layer de la Haye	Cooper's Mill; TL 978 202	Post	1825	1801	Moved to West Mersea 1833	
Layer de la Haye	TL 979 023	Post		1855	1875, gone by 1886	
Lindsell	TL 640 276	Post		1791	1826, replaced by smock mill by 1846	
Lindsell	TL 640 276	Smock		1846	Demolished c. 1906	
Little Baddow	Richardson's Mill; TL 783 071	Post	1724	1655	1757	
Little Baddow	Cranie's Mill; TL 782 070		1813	1819	Moved to Danbury by 1824	
Little Bardfield	Paul's Mill; TL 667 312	Post	1724; 1777; 1805	1572	Burnt down March 1805	
Little Bardfield	Paul's Mill; TL 667 312	Post		1807	1870	
Little Bardfield	Hawkspur Green Mill; TL 654 322	Post	1805	1805	Collapsed c. 1871	
Little Bardfield	Hawkspur Green Mill	Smock		1876	Blown down c. 1928	
Little Bentley	TM 120 257	Post	1825; 1904	1818	Demolished 1905	
Little Canfield	TL 590 214	Post	1700; 1825	1590	Moved to other site in Little Canfield c. 1809	
Little Canfield	TL 601 208	Post		1809	Demolished 1930	
Little Chishill	Little Chishill Mill; TL 413 388	Post	1676; 1724	1676	1819	
Little Chishill	Little Chishill Mill; TL 413 388	Post		1819		
Little Clacton	Foot's Farm Mill; TM 178 180	Post	1777; 1805	1756	1805, possibly moved to Great Clacton c. 1807	
Little Dunmow	Throws Mill; TL 656 224	Post		1875	Demolished 1913; Windmill World	
Little Hallingbury	TL 497 167			1838	1856	
Little Laver	TL 543 090	Post		1579	1797	
Little Laver	TL 543 909	Post		1797	Converted to Composite mill 1850	
Little Laver	TL 543 090	Composite		1850	Demolished December 1963	
Little Leighs	TL 717 167			1662	1662	
Little Maplestead	TL 833 336			1645	1645	
Little Maplestead	Purlshill Mill; TL 797 336			1830	1874, gone by 1887	
Little Sampford	Pettit's Mill; TL 652 347	Post	1724; 1777; 1805; 1893	1724	1893	
Little Sampford	Starling's Mill; Thaxted Road Mill; TL 636 346	Post	1805	1796	1880, gone by 1902	
Little Stambridge	TL 887 905	Post	1893	1814	1893, gone by 1895	
Little Tey	TL 892 237			1861	1861	
Little Totham	Barrow Hill Mill; TL 878 078	Post		1703	Blown down 30 June 1831	
Little Totham	Smith's Mill; TL 878 078	Smock		1831	Demolished 1892	
Little Waltham	TL 718 127	Post	1777; 1805	1760	1845	
Little Warley	TQ 596 903	Smock	1893	1832	Blown down 8 January 1866	
Little Yeldham		Post		1263	1263	

=== M ===
Location	Name of mill and grid reference	Type	Maps	First mention or built	Last mention or demise	Photograph
Maldon	Fullbridge Mill; TL 850 075	Smock		1799	1834, gone by 1841	
Maldon	Herbert's Mill; TL 856 067	Smock		1826	Moved to Stebbing, December 1842	
Manuden	TL 484 266	Post		c. 1340	c. 1340	
Manuden	Maggots End Mill; TL 483 277	Smock	1805; 1825	1762	Demolished 1945	
Margaret Roding	TL 593 105	Post	1724; 1777	1725	Burnt down May 1910	
Margaretting			1678	1666	1678, gone by 1748	
Marks Tey				1624	1624	
Mashbury	TL 643 131	Post	1724; 1777; 1805; 1825	1724	Blown down 28 January 1825	
Mashbury	TL 645 133	Smock		1836	Burnt down 28 November 1896; Windmill World	
Matching	Down Hall Mill; TL 529 131	Post	1805; 1825	1799	1843, gone by 1874	
Matching	Matching Tye Mill; TL 505 112	Post	1825	1825	Demolished 1880; Windmill World	
Mayland	Cardnell's Mill; TL 919 015	Post		1817	Demolished c. 1914	
Mayland	Douce's Mill; TL 935 998	Post		1826	1831, possibly moved to Middleton, Suffolk by 1839	
Mistley	Rigby's Mill; TM 120 316	Smock	1777	1775	1778	
Moreton	TL 534 080	Post	1777	1767	Demolished 1964	
Mount Bures	Newman's Mill; TL 903 315	Post	1825	1822	Demolished c. 1917	
Mount Bures	Doe's Mill; TL 916 315	Post	1825	1811	Demolished 1953	
Mountnessing	TQ 631 980	Post	1678; 1724	1477	1760	
Mountnessing	Mountnessing Mill; TQ 631 980	Post		1807	Windmill World	
Mucking				1654	1686	

=== N ===
Location	Name of mill and grid reference	Type	Maps	First mention or built	Last mention or demise	Photograph
Navestock	TQ 527 970	Post		1355	1355	
Nazeing	TL 451 066	Post		1802	1875	
Newport	TL 515 350		1805; 1825	1805	1876	
Newport	TL 516 357	Smock	1805; 1825	1805	1876	
Newport	TL 518 359	Vertical axis mill				
North Weald		Post		1281	1281	
Norton Mandeville	TL 602 042	Post		1297	1297	

=== O, P ===
Location	Name of mill and grid reference	Type	Maps	First mention or built	Last mention or demise	Photograph
Orsett	TQ 642 815	Post	1678; 1724; 1777; 1805	1678	1887, gone by 1893; Windmill World	
Orsett	Baker Street Mill; TQ 633 813	Smock		1796	Windmill World	
Pebmarsh	Pebmarsh Mills; Approximately TL 854 331	Post		1792	1814	
Pebmarsh	TL 847 340	Smock		1814	1852	
Pebmarsh	TL 847 340	Post		1872	Burnt down 26 April 1895	
Peldon		Post		1282	1282	
Peldon	Strood Mill; TM 007 158	Post	1777; 1805; 1825	1777	Demolished c. 1906	
Pitsea	TQ 743 885	Post	1678; 1724; 1777; 1825	1586	Burnt down July 1891	
Prittlewell		Post		1294	1309	
Prittlewell	Milton Hall Mill; Hamlet Mill; TQ 876 854	Post	1678; 1777	1678	Demolished 1877	
Prittlewell	TQ 874 868		1777	1777	1777, possibly moved to new site in Prittlewell by 1794	
Prittlewell	Old Mill; TQ 873 866	Post	1825	1758	Demolished 1832	
Prittlewell	TQ 873 866	Smock		1832	Demolished c. 1869	
Prittlewell	New Mill; TQ 873 865	Post		1797	Demolished 1871	
Purleigh	Gibcrack's; TL 855 017	Post		1323	1323	
Purleigh	Raven's Mill; TL 834 022	Smock		1778	Demolished 1929	
Purleigh	Mecklenburgh's Mill; TL 815 029	Smock	1844	1844	1852, gone by 1854	
Purleigh	Purleigh Barns Mill; TL 867 998	Composite		1849	1893	

=== Q, R ===
Location	Name of mill and grid reference	Type	Maps	First mention or built	Last mention or demise	Photograph
Quendon	TL 517 309	Post	1678	1678	Blown down October 1795	
Quendon	TL 517 309	Tower		1805	Demolished c. 1906	
Radwinter	Grange Mill; TL 605 367		1724; 1805	1588	1805	
Radwinter	East Mill; TL 611 377	Post	1777; 1825	1777	Demolished c. 1900	
Radwinter	Lower Mill; TL 605 374		1724	1701	Demolished 1732	
Radwinter	North Mill; TL 605 374	Smock		1799	Demolished 1920	
Ramsden Bellhouse	TQ 708 960	Post	1678	1624	Blown down 22 November 1873	
Ramsey				1807	Burnt down 9 January 1822	
Ramsey	Ramsey Mill; TM 209 304	Post		1842	Windmill World	
Rawreth	TQ 774 926	Post		1574	1574	
Rayleigh		Post		1310	1315	
Rayleigh	Ruffles Mill; TQ 811 912	Post	1678; 1724; 1777	1678	Demolished late 1860s	
Rayleigh	TQ 810 904	Post		1786	1877, demolished 1880s	
Rayleigh	TQ 810 904	Post		1799	Demolished 1884	
Rayleigh	Rayleigh Mill; TQ 807 910	Tower		1809	Windmill World	
Rettendon	West Mill; TQ 742 973		1678; 1724	1678	1730	
Rettendon	TQ 773 986	Post	1678	1678	Burnt down December 1872	
Ridgewell	TL 738 402		1777	1777	1777	
Rettendon	TL 736 405	Post	1805	1805	Demolished c. 1904	
Rettendon	TL 732 409	Post		1848	Demolished c. 1922	
Rivenhall	Sach's Mill; Wither's Green Mill; Withie's Farm Mill; TL 795 226	Post	1825	1825	Demolished c. 1897	
Rochford		Post		1274	1331	
Rochford	TQ 887 905	Post		1810	Moved to Little Stambridge, 1814	
Roxwell				1635	1635, gone by 1639	
Roxwell	TL 634 084	Post		1768	1895, gone by 1902	
Roxwell	Pumping mill			1860	1919	
Runwell		Post		1222	1222	

=== S ===
Location	Name of mill and grid reference	Type	Maps	First mention or built	Last mention or demise	Photograph
Saffron Walden	TL 549 412			1514	1549	
Saffron Walden	TL 542 377		1777	1758	1777	
Saffron Walden	Ruse's Mill; TL 542 377	Smock		1785	Demolished 1955	
Saffron Walden	Middleditch's Mill; TL 543 374	Smock		1799	Demolished 1896	
Saffron Walden	Copthall Mill; TL 545 389	Smock		1828	Demolished c. 1896	
Saffron Walden	Thaxted Road Mill; TL 548 379	Post	1805; 1825	1799	1830	
Saffron Walden	Sewards End Mill; TL 556 380	Post		1803	Demolished c. 1909	
Shenfield		Post		1476	1476	
Shenfield	Alexander's Mill; TQ 597 934	Post	1777; 1805; 1893	1777	Demolished or blown down c. 1870	
Shenfield	TQ 598 935		1678; 1724; 1777	1678	1777	
Shenfield	Tasker's Lane Mill; TQ 601 397	Smock	1893	1810	Demolished c. 1880	
Sible Hedingham	TL 779 341	Post	1678; 1724; 1777	1678	1789, gone by 1797	
Shilveston	TL 690 451	Post		1231	1231	
Sible Hedingham	Cutmaple Mill; Metson's Mill; TL 786 324	Post		1775	Demolished 1956	
Sible Hedingham	TL 783 333	Post		1777	Blown down 1824	
Sible Hedingham	Eley's Mill; TL 783 333	Tower		1824	Demolished 1923	
South Benfleet	TQ 782 859		1678	1678	1678	
Southchurch		Post		1294	1294	
Southminster				1585	1585	
Southminster	Ratsborough Mill; TQ 953 895	Post	1678; 1724; 1777	1678	Burnt down November 1781	
Southminster	West Mill; TQ 955 993	Smock	1805	1783	Burnt down c. 1889	
Southminster	East Mill; Cripplegate Mill; TL 962 001	Smock		1790	Demolished 1929	
Southminster	Moor Mill; TM 968 005	Post	1678; 1724	1562	1724	
South Ockendon	TQ 604 819	Post		1295	1362	
South Ockendon	South Ockendon Mill; TQ 604 831	Smock		1829	Collapsed 2 November 1977; Windmill World	
South Shoebury			1678	1678		
South Weald	Weald Mill; TQ 549 956			1662	1761, gone by 1777	
South Weald	Warley Mill; TQ 587 917	Post	1805	1788	1829	
South Weald	Bentley Mill; TQ 568 968	Post	1724; 1777	1724	Moved to Chadwell Heath (Miss Bentley) c. 1820	
South Weald	TQ 568 968	Tower		1821	1884	
South Weald	Brook Street Mill; Rush Mill; TQ 571 925	Post	1805	1778	Demolished 1913	
Springfield	TL 716 074	Post		1655	1655	
Springfield	Arbour Lane Mill; TL 716 074	Post	1777	1767	1792, gone by 1799	
Springfield	Broomfield Mill; TL 717 102	Post	1903	1782	1918	
Springfield	Pease Hall Mill; TL 733 066	Smoxk	1825	1816	Demolished c. 1932	
Stambourne	TL 727 381		1724	1724	1729, gone by 1771	
Stambourne	TL 716 393		1777	1777	1777	
Stambourne	TL 727 388		1805	1800	1815	
Stambourne	TL 714 391	Post	1840	1836	Blown down 3 December 1909	
Stanford Rivers	Littlebury Mill; TL 547 014	Post	1844	1781	1854	
Stanford Rivers	TL 527 984	1761; 1777	1724	1703	Demolished 1797	
Stanford Rivers	Shonks Mill; TL 527 984	Post		1797	1862	
Stanford Rivers	Toothill Mill; TL 515 026	Post	1825	c. 1815	Demolished 1935	
Stansted Mountfitchet	Quendon Road Mill (north); TL 513 260	Post	1724	1724	1866, gone by 1875	
Stansted Mountfitchet	Quendon Road Mill (south)	Post		1788	1798, gone by 1808	
Stansted Mountfitched	Stansted Mountfitchet Mill; TL 510 248	Tower		1787	Windmill World	
Stansted Mountfitchet	Wisbey's Mill; TL 531 259	Smock	1840	1820	1887	
Stapleford Abbotts	TQ 501 956	Post		1566	1655	
Stapleford Abbotts	Passingford Mill; TQ 500 976		1777	1743	1777	
Stapleford Abbotts	Passingford Mill; TQ 502 978	Post	1844	1779	Demolished c. 1857	
Stapleford Tawney	Boyland's Oak Mill; TQ 512 944	Post		1846	Demolished 1923	
Stebbing	Playle's Mill; TL 654 253			1756	1757, demolished by 1770	
Stebbing	Barrack Lane Mill; TL 658 258	Post	1777	1754	Blown down 1821	
Stebbing	Barrack Lane Mill; TL 658 258	Post	1825	1824	1840	
Stebbing	New Mill; Chopping's Mill; TL 655 257	Smock		1832	Demolished c. 1900	
Stebbing	Bran End Mill; TL 649 251	Smock		1842	Blown down March 1895	
Stebbing	Custance's Mill; TL 661 241	Post		1833	1896, gone by 1902	
Steeple Bumpstead		Post		1392	1392	
Steeple Bumpstead	Old Hall Mill; TL 681 401	Post	1724; 1777; 1805	1724	1896, gone by 1905	
Steeple Bumpstead	Suckling's Mill; TL 682 412	Post		1836	1882, gone by 1886	
Steeple Bumpstead	Coe's Mill; TL 677 417		1825	1825	Demolished c. 1893	
Stifford			1678	1678	1686	
Stisted				1770	Burnt down August 1770	
Stisted		Post		1778	1781	
Stock		Post		1476	1476	
Stock	Threadgold's Mill; TQ 693 991	Post		1779	Moved within Stock, 1845	
Stock	Stock Mill; TQ 691 969		1733	1587	Demolished c. 1890	
Stock		Post		1600	1784	
Stock	Stock Mill; TQ 698 987	Tower		1816	Windmill World	
Stock		Post		1845	Demolished c. 1890	
St Osyth	Flag Mill; TM 116 178	Post		1760	1855, gone by 1858	
St Osyth	TM 128 152		1777	1777	1777	
Stow Maries	TL 835 994	Post		1489	1682	

=== T ===
Location	Name of mill and grid reference	Type	Maps	First mention or built	Last mention or demise	Photograph
Takeley				Mid-13th century	Mid-13th century	
Takeley	TL 557 223			1601	1601	
Takeley	TL 552 213		1777; 1805; 1825	1777	1825	
Takeley	Piper's Mill; TL 540 213	Post	1905	1826	Demolished c. 1904	
Takeley	Old Mill; Clarke's Mill; TL 557 233	Post		1776	Demolished c. 1899	
Tendring	South Mill; TM 152 235	Smock	1777; 1825	1777	1844	
Tendring	TM 150 239	Tower	1825	1824	Demolished c. 1921	
Terling	TL 768 144			1698	1698	
Terling	Terling Mill; TL 764 150	Smock	1830		Windmill World	
Thaxted	Hornham Mill; TL 596 296	Post		1456	1456	
Thaxted	Old Mill; Camps's Mill; TL 615 306	Post	1675; 1724	1569	1830	
Thaxted	TL 613 309	Post		1790	1823	
Thaxted	Newbiggin Mill; Boyton End Mill; Fox and Hounds Mill; TL 611 317	Post	1675; 1724	1623	1880, gone by 1893	
Thaxted	Cutlers Green Mill; TL 592 311	Post		1815	Blown down January 1870	
Thaxted	Sibleys Green Mill; TL 617 283	Post		1806	Demolished April 1877	
Thaxted	John Webb's Mill; Lowe's Mill; TL 609 308	Tower		1804	Windmill World	
Theydon Garnon	Theydon Garnon Mill; TL 466 027			1664	1785	
Theydon Mount		Post		1274	1274	
Thorpe-le-Soken	Far Thorpe Green Mill; TM 164 226	Post	1724; 1777	1700	1805	
Thorpe le Soken	Little Mill; TM 178 223	Post	1678; 1724; 1777; 1825	1678	Demolished 1906; Windmill World	
Thorpe le Soken	TM 179 223	Post	1825	1825	1787	
Thorpe le Soken	Great Mill; TM 162 232		1724	1724	1758	
Thorrington	TM 083 193	Post		1740	Blown down 16 December 1869	
Tilty	TL 589 266	Post	1724	1588	1730	
Tollesbury	Sampson's Mill; Golding's Mill; Guyne's Mill; Guisnes Mill; Bourchier's Lodge Mill; TL 942 116	Post	1724; 1777	1724	1866	
Tolleshunt	Oxley Green Mill; Posford's Mill; TL 911 143	Post		1802	Demolished c. 1920	
Tolleshunt	Virley Mill; Smith's Mill; TL 948 138	Post		1793	Demolished c. 1900	
Tolleshunt	TL 978 130	Smock		1870	Collapsed 1914	
Tolleshunt d'Arcy		Post		1282	1282	
Tolleshunt d'Arcy	TL 889 140		1678; 1724	1678	1724	
Tolleshunt Knights	TL 893 166	Post		1764	Demolished 1775	
Tolleshunt Knights	TL 893 166	Post	1777; 1825	1775	1864, gone by 1874	
Tolleshunt Knights	Messing Maypole Mill; Tiptree Mill; TL 894 167	Tower	1777; 1825	1775	Windmill World	
Tolleshunt Major	TL 902 114	Smock		1739	Demolished 1924	
Toppesfield		Post		1252	1252	
Toppesfield	Toppesfield Mill; TL 737 368	Post		1677	Demolished 1888	
Toppesfield	Haxell's Mill; Hardy's Mill; TL 374 332	Smock		1841	Burnt down July 1882	
Toppesfield	Gainsford End Mill; TM 726 351	Post	1805	1800	Demolished 1869	
Toppesfield	Gainsford End Mill; TM 726 351	Tower		1869	Windmill World	

=== U, W ===
Location	Name of mill and grid reference	Type	Maps	First mention or built	Last mention or demise	Photograph
Ugley		Post		1327	1327	
Wakes Colne	TL 892 299	Post	1777; 1825	1765	Burnt down May 1856	
Waltham Holy Cross	Sewardstone Mill		1700	1700	1700	
Waltham Holy Cross	Honey Lane Mill; TQ 394 003	Post	1844	1826	Collapsed 25 August 1911	
Walton on the Naze	Savage's Mill; TM 235 219			1747	1808, demolished by 1820	
Walton on the Naze	Archer's Mill; TM 252 223	Post		1846	Demolished 1921; Windmill World	
Weeley	TM 153 205	Post		1844	Demolished c. 1922	
Wenden Lofts	Lofts Mill; TL461 380	Post	1678; 1724; 1777; 1825	1678	Demolished c. 1920	
Wendens Ambo	TL 510 364	Smock	1805; 1825	1787	1889, later burnt down.	
West Bergholt	Springett's Mill; TL 963 279			1843	1871	
West Horndon		Post		1466	1466	
West Horndon	High Mill; TQ 605 918	Post	1678; 1724	1580	1731, gone by 1736	
West Mersea	Smith's Mill; TM 014 133	Post		1833	Demolished 1919	
West Thurrock		Post		1266	1266	
West Thurrock	Beacon Hill Mill; TQ 550 786			1575	1620	
West Thurrock	Purfleet mill TQ 595 787			1561	1611	
West Thurrock	TQ 598 775	Smock		1799	Demolished c. 1861	
West Thurrock	Torrells Hall Mill	Post		1267	1653	
West Tilbury	TQ 659 787	Post		1584	1584	
West Tilbury	TQ 659 787	Smock	1777	1761	Demolished 1905; Windmill World	
Wethersfield	South Mill; TL 713 306	Post	1678; 1825	1678	1825	
Wethersfield	East Mill; Brand's Mill; TL 738 311	Smock	1777	1774	Demolished c. 1918	
Wethersfield	North West Mill; Livermore's Mill; TL 706 313	Post		1806	1814	
Wethersfield	Joyce's Mill; TL 708 312	Post		c. 1807	Burnt down 10 April 1911	
White Roding		Post		1289	c. 1349	
White Roding	TL 563 131	Post		1609	Blown down 1 January 1877	
White Roding	White Roding Mill; TL 563 131	Tower		1877	Windmill World	
Wicken Bonhunt		Post		1314	1361	
Wicken Bonhunt	TL 501 335	Smock		1765	Demolished c. 1921	
Wicken St Paul	Ruffle's Mill; TL 824 373	Post	1724; 1777	1725	Demolished 1914	
Wicken Bohunt	Oak Farm Mill			1859	1878	
Wickford	TQ 744 915	Post		1247	1300	
Wickham St Paul		Post		1222	1914	
Widdington	TL 532 332			1423	1633	
Widdington	TL 532 332	Post	1724	1660	Demolished c. 1910	
Willingale	Tye Green Mill; Munson's Mill; TL 589 353	Smock	1777; 1825	1757	Demolished 1912	
Willingale	Lower Green Mill; Mynott's Mill; TL 607 352	Smock		1828	1841, moved to new site by 1856	
Willingale	Lower Green Mill; Mynott's Mill; TL 605 350	Smock		1856	Demolished c. 1912	
Wimbish		Post		1252	1252	
Wimbish	Tye Green Mill		1777	1757	Demolished c. 1817	
Wimbish	Tye Green Mill	Smock	1825	1819	Demolished 1912; Windmill World	
Wimbish	Lower Green Mill; Mynott's Mill	Smock		1828	Demolished c. 1912; Windmill World	
Witham	TL 818 139	Smock	1825	1819	Demolished 1847	
Wivenhoe	TM 043 223	Post	1825	1816	Burnt down 17 November 1882	
Wivenhoe	TM 0430 2385					
Wix	Approximately TM 180 280		1724	1569	1724	
Wix	Southgate's Mill; Kindred's Mill; TM 166 283	Post		1808	1896	
Woodham Ferrers	Bicknacre Mill; TL 785 022	Post	1724	1684	Blown down November 1800	
Woodham Ferrers	Bicknacre Mill; TL 785 022	Post		1801	1898, gone by 1904	
Woodham Mortimer	Old Mill; TL 832 044	Smock	1777	1759	1791, gone by 1799	
Woodham Mortimer	Great Mill; TL 832 044	Smock	1777	1768	1895, gone by 1900	
Woodham Walter	TL 813 077			1856	1878	
Writtle	Cooksmill Green Mill	Post		1274	1274	
Writtle	Warren's Mill; TL 639 053	Post	1678; 1724	1678	Burnt down c. 1890	
Writtle	Southgate's Mill; TL 687 063	Post	1678	1516	Blown down 24 June 1897	

== Locations formerly within Essex ==
- For windmills in Barking, Cranham, Dagenham, East Ham, Havering, Leyton, North Ockendon, Rainham, Romford, Upminster, Walthamstow, West Ham and Woodford see List of windmills in London.
- For windmills in Ickleton see List of windmills in Cambridgeshire.
- For windmills in Kedington see List of windmills in Suffolk.

== Maps ==
- 1676 Seller (map of Hertfordshire)
- 1678 John Ogilby & William Morgan
- 1696 John Oliver
- 1700 Robert Morden & John Pask
- 1724 John Warburton, Joseph Bland & Payler Smith
- 1746 John Rocque
- 1749 Emanuel Bowen
- 1761 Thomas Kitchin
- 1757 Sparrow
- 1761 Kitchin
- 1776 John Andrews & Andrew Dury
- 1777 John Chapman & Peter André
- 1781 Carington Bowles
- 1799 J Woodward
- 1804 William Faden
- 1805 Ordnance Survey
- 1818 Christopher and John Greenwood (map of Middlesex)
- 1824 Christopher and John Greenwood
- 1840 Ordnance Survey
- 1844 Ordnance Survey
- 1893 Ordnance Survey
- 1903 Ordnance Survey

== Notes ==
Unless otherwise stated, the source for all entries is the five volume Essex Windmills, Millers and Millwrights.

All mills are listed against the parish in which they were when built, which may not always be the parish with which they are most often associated. This affects-

- Sach's Mill, Cressing – listed under Rivenhall
- Billericay – listed under Great Burstead
- Oxley Green Mill, Tolleshunt d'Arcy – listed under Tolleshunt
- Virley Mill – listed under Tolleshunt
- Messing Maypole Mill, Tiptree under Tolleshunt Knights
