= List of places of interest in Essex =

This is a list of places of interest in the British county of Essex. See List of places in Essex for a list of settlements in Essex.

1. Uttlesford; 2. Braintree; 3. Colchester; 4. Tendring; 5. Harlow; 6. Epping Forest; 7. Chelmsford; 8. Maldon; 9. Brentwood; 10. Basildon; 11. Rochford; 12. Castle Point

== Basildon ==
Name	Image	Location	Description
Barleylands Farm Museum		Billericay	Museum dedicated to rural life, including the Discovery Centre, home to vintage tractors and interactive exhibits, the Craft Village, offering a range of craft workshops and individually owned business, and Barleylands Farm Park, featuring farmyard animals, birds of prey, two indoor playbarns and outdoor play areas.
Church of St. Mary Magdalen, Billericay		Billericay	15th-century Anglican church which is the centrepiece of the historic centre of Billericay. Grade II* listed building.
Church of St. Mary Magdalene, Great Burstead		Billericay	12th-century Anglican church in Great Burstead. Grade I listed building.
Dale Farm		Crays Hill	Plot of land formerly used as an illegal encampment of travellers, which had been established without planning permission within the Green Belt. It was the largest such site in Europe before a clearance order was executed in October 2011 after 10 years of contention.
Historic Centre of Billericay		Billericay	Historic town founded as lodging town on pilgrimage route from London to Canterbury.
New Town of Basildon		Basildon	New town created after Second World War in 1948 to accommodate the London population overspill.
Norsey Wood		Billericay	Mixed coppice woodland with over 4,000 years of history. Scheduled monument, Site of special scientific interest and local nature reserve.

== Braintree ==
Name	Image	Location	Description
Alderford Mill		Sible Hedingham	18th-century watermill. Grade II* listed building.
All Saints Church, Terling		Terling	Early 13th-century Anglican church with major elements dating from 19th-century restoration. Grade II* listed building.
Bocking Windmill		Bocking	Restored post mill built in 1830. Grade I listed building.
Braintree Museum		Braintree	Museum dedicated to local history, industry, textiles, ceramics and art, featuring The Essex Model House, designed by St Osyth Mahala Wood.
Braintree railway station		Braintree	Victorian railway station opened in 1848.
Braintree Town Hall		Braintree	Town hall built in 1926 by Vincent Harris and supported by the wealthy Courtauld family.
Colne Valley Railway		Castle Hedingham	1 mile-long heritage railway with fully reconstructed station, signal box and railway yard.
Cressing Temple		Cressing	Group of three 13th-century timber-framed barns which were amongst the first possessions of the Knights Templar in England, one of which is the oldest timber-framed barn in the world. Grade I listed buildings.
Duck End Mill, Finchingfield		Finchingfield	Restored 18th-century post mill. Grade II listed building.
Gibraltar Mill, Great Bardfield		Great Bardfield	Restored tower mill built c. 1704 which has been converted to residential use. It is the oldest surviving windmill in Essex. Grade II listed building.
Hedingham Castle		Castle Hedingham	Norman motte-and-bailey castle with a stone keep which was for four centuries it was the primary seat of the de Vere family, Earls of Oxford. The castle dates from the 11th century whilst the keep dates from the 12th century. Grade I listed building.
Historic Centre of Castle Hedingham		Castle Hedingham	Historic village that developed around Hedingham Castle.
Historic Centre of Finchingfield		Finchingfield	Historic village and home of Dodie Smith.
Holy Trinity Church, Halstead		Halstead	Redundant Anglican church built in 1843 by George Gilbert Scott in Early English style. Grade II* listed building.
Moyns Park		Steeple Bumpstead	Elizabethan country house that was the home of the Gent family until the late 19th century. Grade I listed building.
Spains Hall		Finchingfield	Elizabethan country house built c. 1570. Former home of the de Ispania, Kempe and Ruggles families. Grade I listed building.
St. Peter-ad-Vincula Church, Coggeshall		Coggeshall	15th-century Anglican church. One of a group of oversized churches built following the success of the early wool-trade in the East Anglia area. Grade I listed building.
Terling Windmill		Terling	Restored smock mill, built c. 1818, which has been converted to residential use. Grade II listed building.
Warner Textile Archive		Braintree	Collection of textiles, designs and paper records opened in 1993. It is the second largest collection of publicly owned textiles in the United Kingdom, consisting of some 100,000 items.

== Brentwood ==
Name	Image	Location	Description
Brentwood Cathedral		Brentwood	Roman Catholic cathedral built in 1861 in a gothic style, before being expanded from 1989 to 1991 in an Italianate Classical style by Quinlan Terry. It is the seat of the Diocese of Brentwood.
Brentwood Railway Station		Brentwood	Victorian railway station opened in 1840.
Chapel of St. Thomas Becket, Brentwood		Brentwood	Ruins of a 12th-century chapel dedicated to Thomas Becket which became a popular stopping point for pilgrims on their way to Canterbury.
Church of St. Mary the Virgin, Great Warley		Great Warley	Anglican church built in 1902, notable for its art nouveau interior designed by William Reynolds-Stephens. Grade I listed building.
Fryerning Mill		Mill Green	Restored post mill built in 1759. Grade II* listed building.
Ingatestone Hall		Ingatestone	16th-century manor house built by Sir William Petre, whose descendants live there to this day. It hosted Elizabeth I on her royal progress of 1561. Grade I listed building.
Ingatestone Railway Station		Ingatestone	Victorian railway station opened in 1843. Grade II listed building.
Kelvedon Hatch Secret Nuclear Bunker		Kelvedon Hatch	Large underground bunker maintained during the Cold War as a potential regional government headquarters. Since being decommissioned in 1992, the bunker has been open to the public as a tourist attraction, with a museum focusing on its Cold War history.
Mountnessing Windmill		Mountnessing	Post mill built in 1807 that has been restored to working order. Grade II* listed building.
Thorndon Hall		Ingrave	Georgian palladian country house built in 1764 by James Paine. Former seat of the Petre family, who now live at Ingatestone Hall. Grade I listed building.
Warley Barracks and Essex Regiment Chapel		Warley	Series of military buildings constructed after the local common was used as a military camp in 1742, before becoming the East India Company's barracks in 1842 and then later the British headquarters of Ford Motor Company. The chapel was built in 1857 and now contains displays of regimental history, memorials, heraldry and regimental colours. Grade II listed building.
West Horndon Railway Station		West Horndon	Victorian railway station opened in 1886.

== Castle Point ==
Name	Image	Location	Description
Canvey Island Transport Museum		Canvey Island	Museum featuring various historic modes of transport, public road transport artefacts and a model train layout, located in a converted bus depot.
Dutch Cottage Museum		Canvey Island	Museum containing a variety of exhibits that illustrate the history of Canvey Island.
Hadleigh Castle		Hadleigh	Ruined medieval castle built after 1215 by Hubert de Burgh, before later being remodelled by Edward III, who turned it into a grander property, designed to defend against potential French attack. Grade I listed building.
Hadleigh Farm		Hadleigh	Educational working farm and cross-country cycling venue which hosted the men's and women's mountain biking events of the 2012 Olympic Games.
Labworth Café		Canvey Island	Pioneering modernist International style reinforced concrete building designed by Ove Arup from 1932 to 1933. It is the only building solely designed by the distinguished engineer in existence. Grade II listed building.

== Chelmsford ==
Name	Image	Location	Description
Anglia Ruskin University Chelmsford Campus		Chelmsford	One of the central campuses of Anglia Ruskin University, founded as a university in 1992.
Battlesbridge Antiques Centre		Battlesbridge	A number of antiques centres and shops, one of which is a former mill.
Battlesbridge Motorcycle Museum		Battlesbridge	Motorcycle museum featuring a number of classic motorbikes.
Chelmsford Cathedral		Chelmsford	Anglican cathedral built c. 1200 that is the seat of the Diocese of Chelmsford. Grade I listed building.
Hanningfield Reservoir		South Hanningfield	Eleventh largest reservoir in England.
Hylands House and Park		Chelmsford	Neoclassical villa situated in a large park best known as one of the locations of the annual V Festival. The house was built in 1730 by Sir John Comyns, with the neoclassical facade added in 1814 by Pierre Cesar Labouchere. Grade II* listed building.
RHS Garden, Hyde Hall		Rettendon	One of four public gardens run by the Royal Horticultural Society, receiving around 130,000 visitors per year.
Stock Windmill		Stock	Preserved tower mill built in c. 1816. Grade II* listed building.

== Colchester ==
Name	Image	Location	Description
Abberton Reservoir		Layer de la Haye	Freshwater storage reservoir which is the largest freshwater body in Essex and fourth largest in England. Notable for its biodiversity, including golden plovers, gadwalls, shovellers, teals and cormorants, as well as its use by the RAF's 617 Squadron (the Dam Busters) for practice runs for the bombing of German dams during the Second World War. Designated Special Protection Area.
Balkerne Gate		Colchester	1st-century Roman gateway which is the largest Roman gateway surviving in Britain and was built where the Roman road from Londinium intersected the town wall. Grade I listed building.
Church of St Leonard at the Hythe, Colchester		The Hythe	Redundant Anglican church which, for a long time, served as the church of the port of Colchester. Royalist soldiers took refuge here during the English Civil War and bullet holes from this incident survive in the door. Grade II* listed building.
Church of St Peter & St Paul, West Mersea		West Mersea	Church believed to have been founded around the 7th century under which a large mosaic floor was found in 1730, with Richard Grough finding further evidence of Roman remains around the church in 1764.
Colchester Castle		Colchester	An example of a largely complete Norman castle which contains a museum dedicated to the long and varied history of Colchester. Grade I listed building.
Colchester Railway Station		Colchester	Victorian railway station opened in 1843.
Colchester Roman Town Wall		Colchester	First town walls in Britain, predating other such walls in the province by at least 150 years. Grade I listed building.
Colchester Town Hall		Colchester	Edwardian baroque edifice by John Belcher and headquarters of local government. Grade I listed building.
Colchester Zoo		Colchester	Zoo which receives around 800,000 visitors per year. It is home to many rare and endangered species, including big cats, primates and birds.
Dedham Vale		Dedham	Area of Outstanding Natural Beauty comprising the area around the River Stour best known since the artist's lifetime as Constable Country, as it was made famous by the paintings of John Constable.
East Anglian Railway Museum		Wakes Colne	Museum with a wide collection of locomotives and rolling stock, some of which are fully restored, two are converted into Thomas and Toby replicas while others are undergoing repair and restoration. It also plays host to three popular annual events: the Winter Beer Festival, the Cider Festival and the Summer Beer Festival.
Firstsite		Colchester	Contemporary art gallery featuring works by artists including J. M. W. Turner, Henry Moore and Grayson Perry.
Historic Centre of Colchester		Colchester	Historic town claimed to be the oldest in Britain, as the oldest recorded Roman town in the country. It features a wide variety of historic buildings from various eras of its long history, and is also a major shopping area with a prominent market.
Hollytrees Museum		Colchester	Local history museum located in a house built by Elizabeth Cornelisen in 1718. Grade I listed building.
Holy Trinity Church, Colchester		Colchester	Anglo-Saxon church built c. 1020, making it the oldest surviving church building in Colchester. Its churchyard includes the graves of William Gilbert, discoverer of electromagnetism, and the composer John Wilbye. It is now a café and youth venue for arts and music. Grade I listed building.
Jumbo Water Tower		Colchester	Victorian water tower built in 1883 which was claimed at the time to be the second largest water tower in England. Grade II* listed building.
Layer Marney Tower		Layer Marney	Tudor palace, composed of buildings, gardens and parkland, dating from 1520. It is in many ways the apotheosis of the Tudor gatehouse, and is the tallest example in Britain, as well as being a rare combination of brick and terracotta construction.
Lexden Earthworks and Bluebottle Grove		Colchester	Banks and ditches of a series of late Iron Age defences protecting the western side of Camulodunum – pre-Roman Colchester.
Mersea Island		Mersea Island	Island used as a holiday destination in Roman Britain for occupants of Camulodunum which became popular with smugglers from the 16th to the 19th centuries and became a focal point for troops in both world wars, with a number of observation posts still present on the island.
Messing Maypole Mill		Tiptree	Grade II listed tower mill which has been converted to a residence.
Old St Mary's Church, West Bergholt		West Bergholt	Redundant Anglican church, the oldest parts of which are Saxon, its north wall dating from about 1000. Grade I listed building.
St. Botolph's Priory		Colchester	Ruins of a Medieval Augustinian religious house which was the first and leading Augustinian convent in England until its dissolution in 1536.
St. Helen's Chapel, Colchester		Colchester	Dedicated to Saint Helena, the 14th-century Chronicle of Colchester states that the chapel was founded by the saint herself and refounded by Eudo Dapifer in 1076. Most of the present building dates from the 12th and 13th centuries, incorporating Roman brick.
St. John's Abbey Gatehouse		Colchester	Remains of a Benedictine monastic institution founded in 1095 and dissolved in 1539.
University of Essex Wivenhoe Park Campus		Colchester	Central campus of the University of Essex, ranked ninth in the UK for the quality of its research in 2008.
Wilkin & Sons Factory and Visitor Centre		Tiptree	Factory founded in 1885 which makes preserves, marmalades and associated products. The Visitor Centre features a tearoom, shop, and museum about the company's history, jam-making, and village life.

== Epping Forest ==
Name	Image	Location	Description
Copped Hall		Epping	Georgian country house built by John Conyers in 1751–58, at one time known as the premier house of Essex. Grade II* listed building.
Epping Forest		Epping	Area of ancient woodland and former royal forest, now managed by the City of London Corporation. It contains areas of woodland, grassland, heath, rivers, bogs and ponds, and most of it is a Site of Special Scientific Interest.
Epping Ongar Railway		Loughton	Heritage railway which was the final section of the Great Eastern Railway branch line before being closed by London Underground in 1994, then reopened between 2004 and 2007 as a preserved railway offering a volunteer-run Class 117 DMU service between Ongar and Coopersale.
Greensted Church		Greensted	The oldest wooden church in the world, and probably the oldest wooden building in Europe still standing, albeit only in part, since few sections of its original wooden structure remain. The oak walls are often classified as remnants of a palisade church or a kind of early stave church, dated either to the mid-9th or mid-11th century.
Hill Hall		Epping	Elizabethan mansion containing internal wall-paintings that considered the most important surviving examples of Elizabethan decorative figure painting in England.
Historic Centre of Waltham Abbey		Waltham Abbey	Historic market town that takes its name from the Abbey Church of Waltham Holy Cross, a scheduled monument that was prominent in the town's early history.
Lopping Hall		Loughton	Opened in 1884 in compensation for the loss of the right to lop wood in Epping Forest and now used mainly for amateur drama performances.
Loughton Hall		Loughton	The most significant of the great houses of this period, built as country retreats for wealthy City merchants and courtiers and owned by Mary I two months before she became queen in 1553.
North Weald Airfield		North Weald Bassett	Operational general aviation aerodrome established in 1916, which played an important role during the Battle of Britain in the Second World War, when it acted as an RAF station. It is now home to a museum and several historic aircraft.
Waltham Abbey Bridge and Gatehouse		Waltham Abbey	Fine 14th-century gatehouse and bridge that are amongst the oldest remains of one of the great monastic foundations of the Middle Ages. Owned and managed by English Heritage.
Waltham Abbey Church		Waltham Abbey	Having been a place of worship since the 7th century, the present building dates mainly from the early 12th century and is an example of Norman architecture. In the late Middle Ages, it was one of the largest church buildings in England and a major site of pilgrimage; in 1540 was the last religious community to be closed during the Dissolution of the Monasteries.
Waltham Abbey Royal Gunpowder Mills		Waltham Abbey	One of three Royal Gunpowder Mills in the UK and the only site to have survived virtually intact, having been in operation for over 300 years.

== Harlow ==
Name	Image	Location	Description
Gibberd Garden		Harlow	Garden designed by Sir Frederick Gibberd with modern sculptures and curios.
New Town of Harlow		Harlow	A 'Phase I' new town built after World War II to ease overcrowding in London and the surrounding areas due to the mass devastation caused by the bombing during the Blitz.
St. Mary's Church, Harlow		Old Harlow	Grade II listed church which is the best known example of the architecture of Old Harlow before it was engulfed by the new town of Harlow. Its former chapel, which is in a ruinous state in a field which was once the Harlowbury Abbey part of Old Harlow, is Grade I listed and is a scheduled monument.

== Maldon ==
Name	Image	Location	Description
Burnham-on-Crouch Royal Corinthian Yacht Club Clubhouse		Burnham-on-Crouch	Clubhouse designed by Joseph Emberton in 1931 which represented Britain's contribution to the International Exhibition of Modern Architecture held at the Museum of Modern Art in New York City in 1932. Grade II* listed building.
Chapel of St Peter-on-the-Wall		Bradwell-on-Sea	Among the oldest largely intact Christian church buildings 19th oldest building in England, dating from the 7th century. It is one of the oldest functioning churches in the country. Grade I listed building.
Historic Centre of Maldon and its Seafront		Maldon	Historic fishing town on Blackwater Estuary.
Mangapps Railway Museum		Burnham-on-Crouch	Heritage railway centre containing 0.75 miles (1.21 km) of standard gauge demonstration train-track and a museum.
Maldon District Agricultural & Domestic Museum		Maldon	Museum featuring vintage farm machinery and equipment, agriculture tools and household items.
Thalatta		Maldon	Thames sailing barge built in 1906 whose home port is Maldon.

== Rochford ==
Name	Image	Location	Description
London Southend Airport		Rochford	International airport which served as London's third-busiest airport during the 1960s and remains a major airport serving London.
Rayleigh Castle		Rayleigh	Earthwork remains of a large 11th-century motte-and-bailey castle built shortly after the Norman Conquest.
Rayleigh Windmill		Rayleigh	Tower mill built in 1809 which has been restored as a landmark and is used as a museum. Grade II listed building.
Rochford Hall		Rochford	Manor built in 1216 and former home to Thomas Boleyn, father of Anne Boleyn. Grade I listed building.

== Southend-on-Sea ==
Name	Image	Location	Description
Adventure Island		Southend-on-Sea	Amusement park with 32 different rides, as well as attractions including a gift shop and catering outlets.
Cliffs Pavilion		Westcliff-on-Sea	Major theatre that has hosted a variety of acts including Oasis, Blur, Paul McCartney, Gloria Gaynor and One Direction.
Historic Centre of Southend-on-Sea and its Seafront		Southend-on-Sea	Historic seaside town and the main seaside resort in southern Essex, with the connection to the sea being important to the identity of the local people. It contains a number of important Victorian buildings.
Prittlewell Priory		Prittlewell	12th-century Cluniac priory founded as a cell to the Priory of St Pancras at Lewes, Sussex. It was one of the lesser monasteries housing not more than 18 monks.
Roots Hall Stadium		Southend-on-Sea	Home ground of the Football League Two club Southend United F.C. and the largest football stadium in Essex.
Southchurch Hall		Southchurch	Early 14th-century half-timbered manor house with period rooms depicting life in different centuries. Grade I listed building.
Southend Central Museum		Southend-on-Sea	Museum opened in 1981 housing collections of local and natural history and containing a planetarium constructed by astronomer Harry Ford in 1984. It previously served as Southend's first free public library. Grade II listed building.
Southend Pier		Southend-on-Sea	Longest pleasure pier in the world. Grade II listed building.
St. Laurence and All Saints Church, Eastwood		Eastwood	11th-century Anglicanism church believed to be one of the finest and most important small medieval churches in South Essex. Grade I listed building.

== Tendring ==
Name	Image	Location	Description
Beth Chatto Gardens		Elmstead Market	Informal collection of ecological gardens created by plantswoman Beth Chatto in 1960 from the gravel soil and bogs of the disused fruit farm belonging to her husband Andrew Chatto.
Clacton Pier		Clacton-on-Sea	Pleasure pier opened on 27 July 1871, officially being the first building erected in the then-new resort of Clacton-on-Sea. A wooden structure 160 yards (150 m) in length and 4 yards (3.7 m) wide, the pier served as a landing point for goods and passengers, a docking point for steamships operated by the Woolwich Steam Packet Company, and a popular spot for promenading.
Dovercourt High Lighthouse		Dovercourt	Cast iron lighthouse used until 1917 to guide ships around Landguard Point along with Dovercourt Low Lighthouse; the two lights aligned indicated the right course.
Dovercourt Low Lighthouse		Dovercourt	Cast iron lighthouse used until 1917 to guide ships around Landguard Point along with Dovercourt High Lighthouse; the two lights aligned indicated the right course.
Gunfleet Sands Offshore Wind Farm		Clacton-on-Sea	172 MW wind farm about 7 kilometres off the Clacton-on-Sea coast in the Northern Thames Estuary.
Halfpenny Pier, Harwich		Harwich	Pier. The name derives from the toll charged to users of the pier.
Harwich High Lighthouse		Harwich	The higher of stone twin lighthouses designed by John Rennie Senior. In 1836 the lease on the lights was purchased by Trinity House, but in 1863 they were declared redundant due to a change the position of the channel used by ships entering and leaving the port, caused by shifting sands.
Harwich Redoubt		Harwich	Circular fort built in 1808 to defend Harwich from Napoleonic invasion.
Harwich Royal Navy Dockyard		Harwich	Dockyard established in 1652 as it was ideally positioned for readying the fleet in the Anglo-Dutch Wars of the 17th century. Thereafter its importance waned; it ceased to operate as a Royal Dockyard in 1713, but was leased to a succession of private operators under whom naval and commercial shipbuilding continued.
Harwich Maritime Museum		Harwich	The lower of stone twin lighthouses designed by John Rennie Senior. In 1836 the lease on the lights was purchased by Trinity House, but in 1863 they were declared redundant due to a change the position of the channel used by ships entering and leaving the port, caused by shifting sands. It has now been converted into a maritime museum.
Historic Centre of Clacton-on-Sea and its Seafront		Clacton-on-Sea	Historic seaside town and the largest town in the Tendring peninsula.
Historic Centre of Frinton-on-Sea and its Seafront		Frinton-on-Sea	Small seaside town which developed in the late 1890s.
Manningtree Railway Station		Manningtree	Victorian railway station opened in 1846.
Mistley Railway Station		Mistley	Victorian railway station opened in 1854.
Mistley Towers		Mistley	The twin towers of the now demolished Church of St. Mary the Virgin, designed by Robert Adam in 1776.
Naze		Walton-on-the-Naze	Headland projecting into the North Sea notable as an important site for migrating birds, including wintering ducks and brant geese.
Naze Tower		Walton-on-the-Naze	Hanoverian navigational tower, constructed to assist ships on this otherwise fairly feature-less coast. Visitors can climb the 111-step spiral staircase to the top of the 86-foot (26 m) tower for a 360 degree view of the beach and countryside.
Ramsey Windmill		Ramsey	Grade II listed post mill.
Thorrington Tide Mill		Thorrington	Tide mill built in 1831. Grade II* listed building.
Trinity House Offices, Harwich		Harwich	Headquarters of Trinity House completed in 2005.
Walton Maritime Museum		Walton-on-the-Naze	Museum of natural and local history, featuring maritime artefacts including a restored James Stevens 14 lifeboat and located in a former lifeboat station.

== Thurrock ==
Name	Image	Location	Description
Baker Street Mill, Orsett		Orsett	Restored late 18th-century smock mill which has been part adapted to residential use on its lower two floors only. It is the oldest surviving smock mill in Essex. Grade II listed building.
Coalhouse Fort		East Tilbury	Large casemated fort containing a museum of memorabilia from World War I and II.
Lakeside Shopping Centre		West Thurrock	Large out-of-town shopping centre.
Ockendon Railway Station		South Ockendon	Victorian railway station opened in 1892.
Orsett Hall		Orsett	2009 rebuilding of a 17th-century country house set in 12 acres of parkland which was destroyed by fire in 2007.
Queen Elizabeth II Bridge		Thurrock	Major road bridge over the River Thames.
State Cinema		Grays	Grade II* listed former art-deco cinema.
Tilbury Fort		Tilbury	Fort built to defend London from attack from the sea, particularly during the Spanish Armada and the Anglo-Dutch Wars. The defences were fully rebuilt as a bastion fort in the late 17th century and it is the finest surviving example of the military architecture of that era in England.

== Uttlesford ==
Name	Image	Location	Description
Audley End House and Gardens		Saffron Walden	Large 17th-century country house, which is considered to be one of the finest examples of Jacobean houses in England. It also includes gardens designed by Capability Brown and a large collection of art and taxidermy.
Audley End Miniature Railway		Saffron Walden	Miniature Railway with Fairy and Elf Walk in the Capability Brown designed gardens and woodland.
Aythorpe Roding Windmill		Aythorpe Roding	Post mill built c. 1779, which has been restored to working order and is the oldest working windmill in Essex. Grade II* listed building.
Bragg's Mill, Ashdon		Ashdon	Restored post mill built in 1757, which is the oldest surviving post mill in Essex. Grade II listed building.
Bridge End Gardens		Saffron Walden	Grade II* listed group of seven linked ornamental gardens.
Chapel of St Helen, Wicken Bonhunt		Wicken Bonhunt	Religious building dating from the 11th century which is believed to be one of the oldest surviving buildings in the east of England.
Clavering Castle		Clavering	Pre-Norman ringworks and earthworks.
Clavering Windmills		Clavering	Pair of Grade II listed tower mills which have both been converted to residential use.
Fry Art Gallery		Saffron Walden	Art gallery best known for its displays of work by the Great Bardfield Artists, including Edward Bawden and Eric Ravilious.
Hatfield Forest		Hatfield Broad Oak	1,049 acres of woodland, wood pasture, lake and marsh. The only remaining intact Royal Hunting Forest and dates from the time of the Norman kings.
Historic Centre of Ashdon		Ashdon	Small, historic village.
Historic Centre of Clavering		Clavering	Small, historic village containing a number of historic buildings.
Historic Centre of Great Dunmow		Great Dunmow	Ancient market town, originally the site of a Roman settlement on Stane Street, which thrived during the Middle Ages. Many buildings survive from this period, including a 16th-century town hall.
Historic Centre of Saffron Walden		Saffron Walden	Historic market town and the administrative headquarters of Uttlesford District. The town retains a rural appearance and has buildings dating from the medieval period onwards.
Historic Centre of Stansted Mountfitchet		Stansted Mountfitchet	Historic village of Saxon origin which contains a number of historic buildings.
Historic Centre of Thaxted		Thaxted	Historic market town with over 1,000 years of history and a number of important historic buildings. It has been described as the best example of the juxtaposition of medieval and Georgian architecture in Britain.
Historic Centre of Wicken Bonhunt		Wicken Bonhunt	Small, historic village.
John Webb's Mill, Thaxted		Thaxted	Tower mill built in 1804 which had been restored to working order, being the oldest working tower mill in Essex, but is currently out of action following the loss of a sail in April 2010. Grade II* listed building.
London Stansted Airport		Stansted Mountfitchet	Major international airport. It is a base for a number of major European low-cost carriers, being the largest base for low-cost airline Ryanair with over 100 destinations served by the airline. In 2014 it was the fourth busiest airport in the United Kingdom after Heathrow, Gatwick and Manchester.
Prior's Hall Barn		Widdington	15th-century timber-framed barn. One of the finest surviving medieval barns in eastern England, with a breathtaking aisled interior and crown post roof.
Saffron Walden Museum		Saffron Walden	Established in 1835 by Saffron Walden Natural History Society.
Saffron Walden Turf Maze		Saffron Walden	Largest turf maze in Europe.
Stansted Mountfitchet Castle		Stansted Mountfitchet	Norman ringwork and bailey fortification that was reconstructed in 1980 as a tourist attraction.
Stansted Mountfitchet Railway Station		Stansted Mountfitchet	Victorian railway station opened in 1845.
Stansted Mountfitchet Windmill		Stansted Mountfitchet	Grade II* listed tower mill which has been restored and can turn by wind. Scheduled monument.
St. Margaret's Church, Wicken Bonhunt		Wicken Bonhunt	Parish church, parts of which, including the chancel, are 13th century. The interior includes a font that is thought to date from the 12th century. Grade II* listed building.
St. Mary & St. Clement Church		Clavering	Largely 15th-century church, but contains some features from a pre-medieval church that stood on the site. Notable objects include the carved Elizabethan pulpit and stained glass.
St Mary's Church, Chickney		Chickney	Redundant church dating from a time before the Norman conquest, from either the late 10th or the early 11th century. Grade I listed building.
St. Mary the Virgin Church, Saffron Walden		Saffron Walden	Largest parish church in Essex. It dates mainly from the end of the 15th century, when an old smaller church was extensively rebuilt in flint.
Thaxted Guildhall		Thaxted	Town hall dating from around 1450, and the centrepiece of the historic centre of Thaxted.
Walden Castle		Saffron Walden	Ruins of a medieval castle built during the Anarchy of the 12th century.
White Roding Windmill		White Roding	Preserved tower mill built in 1877. Grade II listed building.
