= East Mill =

East Mill is the name of a number of mills.

== Windmills ==
- East Mill, Billinghay, a windmill in Lincolnshire
- East Mill, Brighton, a windmill in East Sussex
- East Mill, Briston, a windmill in Norfolk
- East Mill, Caister, a windmill in Norfolk
- East Mill, Findsbury Fields, Clerkenwell, a windmill in Middlesex
- East Mill, Corringham, a windmill in Lincolnshire
- East Mill, Great Chesterford, a windmill in Essex
- East Mill, Halstead, a windmill in Essex
- East Mill, Hardwick, a windmill in Norfolk
- East Mill, Hornsea, a windmill in the East Riding of Yorkshire
- East Mill, Keyingham, a windmill in the East Riding of Yorkshire
- East Mill, Patrington a windmill in the East Riding of Yorkshire
- East Mill, Poringland, a windmill in Norfolk
- East Mill, Radwinter, a windmill in Essex
- East Mill, Smarden, a windmill in Kent
- East Mill, Southminster, a windmill in Essex
- East Mill, Wethersfield, a windmill in Essex
- East Mill, Worthing, a windmill in West Sussex
