= Debden Windmill =

Windmill in Debden, Essex, England

Debden Mill
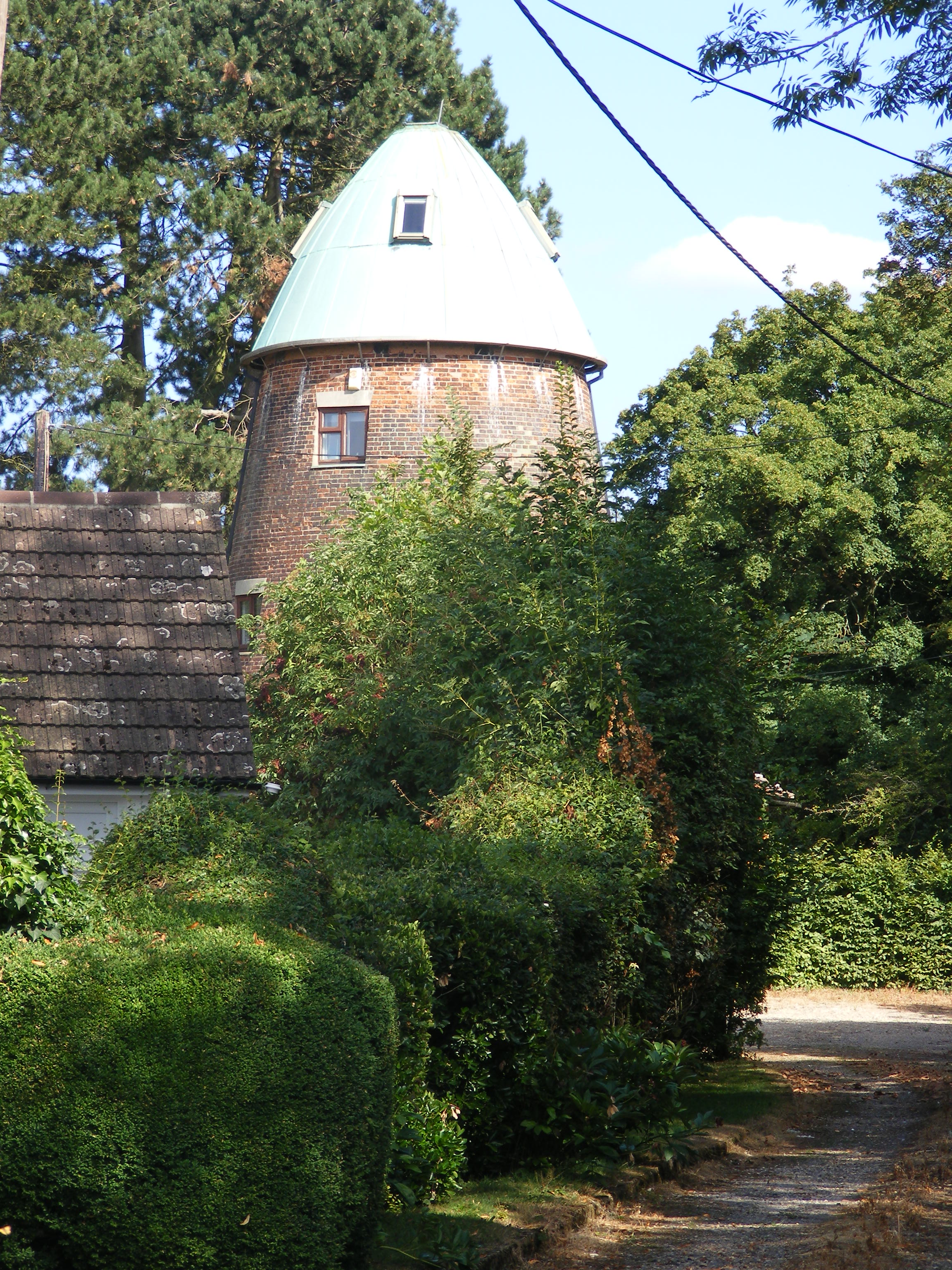
- Debden Mill, August 2018
- Interactive map of Debden Mill

Origin
- Mill name: Debden Mill
- Mill location: TL 555 336
- Coordinates: 51°58′44″N 0°15′47″E
- Operator: Private
- Year built: 1796

Information
- Purpose: Corn mill
- Type: Tower mill
- Storeys: Four storeys
- No. of sails: Four sails
- Type of sails: Double Patent sails
- Windshaft: Cast iron
- Winding: Fantail
- No. of pairs of millstones: Three pairs

Debden Windmill is a grade II listed Tower mill at Debden, Essex, England which has been converted to residential use.

== History ==
Debden Windmill was built in 1796, replacing a Post mill which stood nearby. It was insured in 1797 by William Thurgood for £500 including the going gears and stock in trade. The fantail was blown off the mill on March 26th, 1882 and the cap and sails were blown off on a Sunday in October 1887. Repairs were completed by 15 March 1888. The mill was working until 1911, in which year the sails and windshaft were removed. The mill was used as a scout hut in the 1930s and was little more than a shell in the 1950s. In 1957, a new cap was fitted and the mill converted to residential use.

== Description ==
Debden Windmill is a four storey tower mill. When working it carried a conical cap with a gallery, winded by a fantail. The windshaft was cast iron and carried four double Patent sails which rotated clockwise. The Brake wheel was wood, driving a cast iron Wallower carried on a wooden Upright Shaft. The wooden Great Spur Wheel drove three pairs of millstones.

== Millers ==
- William Thurgood 1797
- Isaac Thurgood 1832
- John Holland Jr 1844
- John Dennison 1855
- Frank Holland 1870–1874
- Alfred Ely 1878–1890
- Charles (Clap) Ennos & Sons 1894 - 1910

References for above:-
