= Church End Mill, Great Dunmow =

Windmill in Great Dunmow, Essex, England

Great Dunmow Mill
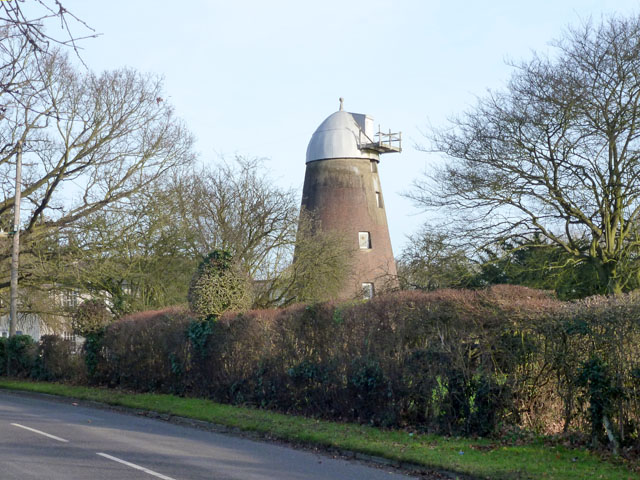
- Interactive map of Great Dunmow Mill

Origin
- Mill name: Church End Mill
- Mill location: TL 633 226
- Coordinates: 51°52′37″N 0°22′26″E
- Operator: Private
- Year built: 1822

Information
- Purpose: Corn mill
- Type: Tower mill
- Storeys: Four storeys
- No. of sails: Four sails
- Type of sails: Patent sails
- Windshaft: Cast iron
- Winding: Fantail
- Auxiliary power: Steam engine
- No. of pairs of millstones: Two pairs, plus a third pair driven by auxiliary power

Church End Mill is a grade II listed Tower mill at Great Dunmow, Essex, England which has been converted to residential use.

== History ==
Church End Mill was built by William Redington, a miller from Harlow in 1822 for John Fuller. It incorporated a badly implemented second-hand machinery from a smock mill from an unknown location and the total cost of the mill was £564 10s 6d. In 1840, a new cast iron windshaft and Patent sails were fitted, but the windshaft snapped during a gale on 13 November, less than three months after it had been fitted. The sails landed on the outbuildings connected with the mill. The mill remained in the ownership of John Fuller until his death in 1887. The mill did little trade after 1894, and ceased work c1902, the sails being removed then. By 1907 it was being used as a studio and during World War II was used as an observation post, the cap having been removed by then. A new cap was fitted in 1974 by millwright Philip Barrett-Lennard. The mill has been house converted, with no machinery remaining inside.

== Description ==
Church End Mill is a four-storey tower mill with a conical cap with a ball finial. The mill had four single Patent sails carried on a cast-iron windshaft and was winded by a six-bladed fantail. The tower is 40 feet (12.19 m) high to curb level, 20 feet (6.10 m) diameter at base level and 10 feet (3.05 m) diameter at the curb. The brickwork is 2 feet 3 inches (690 mm) thick at base level. There was a stage at first-floor level. Two pairs of French Burr millstones were driven by wind, with a third pair by steam engine towards the end of the mill’s working life.

As originally built, the mill had an oak windshaft, 23 inches (580 mm) square at the poll end and 14 feet 6 inches (4.42 m) long carrying four Common sails with cloths 30 feet (9.14 m) long by 4 feet 6 inches (1.37 m) wide. The windshaft carried an elm brake wheel 9 feet (2.74 m) diameter with 80 cogs, which drove an elm wallower 4 feet 8 inches (1.42 m) diameter with 46 cogs, carried on an oak upright shaft 21 feet 6 inches (6.55 m) long and 15 inches (380 mm) square. The clasp arm elm great spur wheel was 8 feet (2.44 m) diameter, with 105 cogs. It drove two elm stone nuts of 28 inches (710 mm) diameter, each having 28 cogs.

== Millers ==
- Richard Hitching 1834–1840
- Harvey 1874 -
- William Henry Harvey 1882 - 1894

References for above:-
