= White Roding =

Village in Essex, England

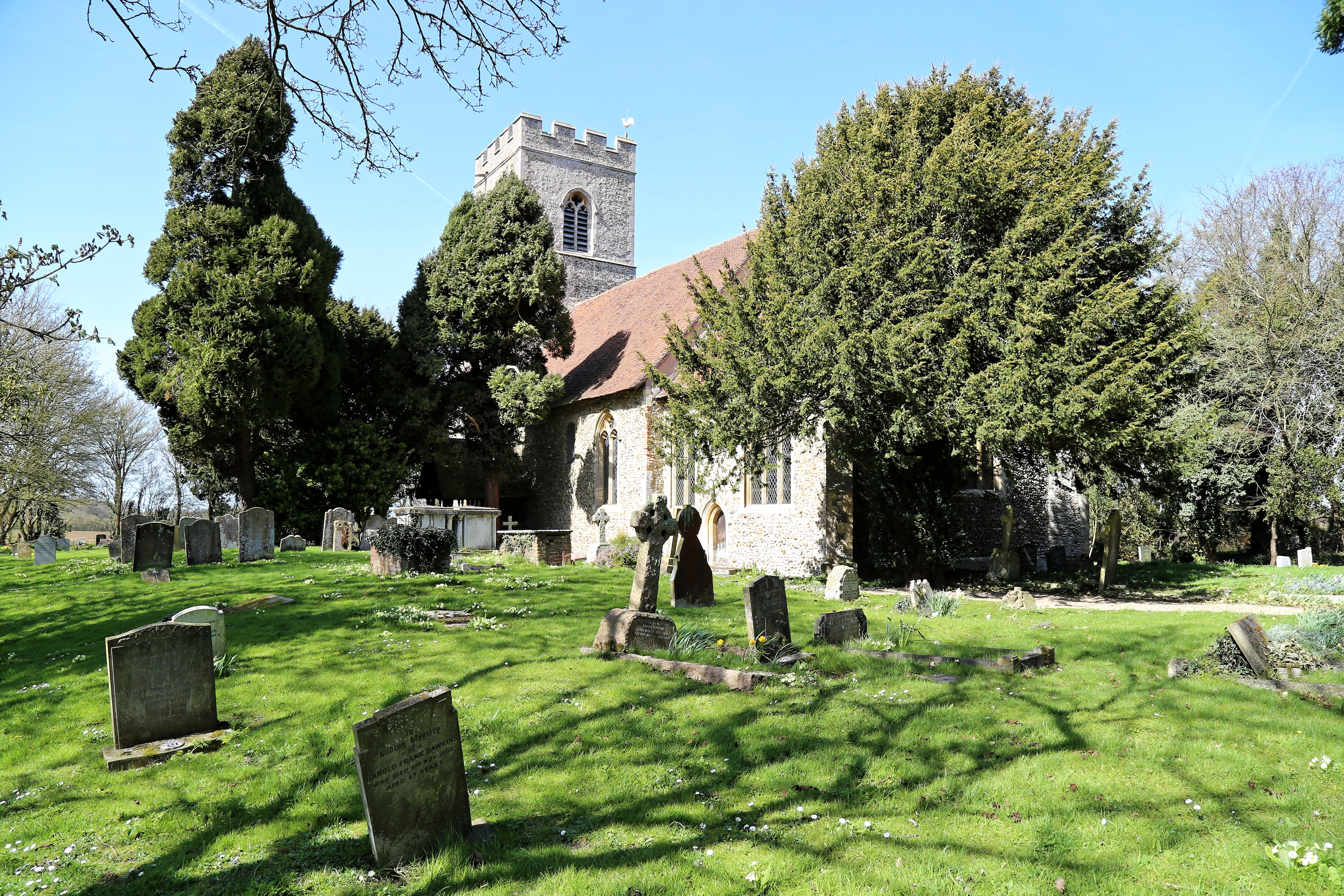
- St Martin's Church

- Location within Essex
- Population: 321 (Parish, 2021)
- OS grid reference: TL562136
- Civil parish: White Roding
- District: Uttlesford
- Shire county: Essex
- Region: East
- Country: England
- Sovereign state: United Kingdom
- Post town: Dumnow
- Postcode district: CM6
- Dialling code: 01279
- Police: Essex
- Fire: Essex
- Ambulance: East of England
- UK Parliament: Saffron Walden

White Roding or White Roothing is a village and civil parish in the Uttlesford district of Essex, England. The village is included in the eight hamlets and villages called The Rodings. White Roding is 8 miles (13 km) north-west from the county town of Chelmsford. At the 2021 census the parish had a population of 321.

== History ==
According to A Dictionary of British Place Names, Roding derives from "Rodinges" as is listed in the Domesday Book, with the later variation 'White Roeng' recorded in 1248. The 'White' refers to the colour of the parish church walls. White Roding itself is not listed in the Domesday survey, although its parish-incorporated small manor of Morrell Roding is, and is listed as in the Hundred of Ongar. Morrell Roding manor was of 11 households, three villagers, three smallholders, and one slave, and included two lord's plough teams, one men's plough team, 19 acres (0.08 km^{2}) of meadow, and a woodland with 100 pigs. In 1066 there were 10 cattle, six pigs, 50 sheep, and a cob. In 1086 there were 25 cattle, 89 pigs, 55 goats, 225 sheep, seven cobs, and eight beehives. Before the Conquest, lordship was held by Saemer, as his only manor; after given to Thorgisl, under Eudo Dapifer who was Tenant-in-chief to William the Conqueror. Morrell Roding (at 51.8162°N 0.260667°E), was previously centred on Cammas Hall (also written as 'Cammass'), at the north of the parish.

Traditional alternative names for the parish and village include White Roothing, White Rooding and Roding Alba, although the parish was contemporaneously referred to with the 'Roding' suffix in trade directories, gazetteers, sources, and in official documents and maps. Today the official parish and village name for local, district and parliamentary governance is 'White Roding', although some sources, particularly Ordnance Survey, will also include the 'Roothing' suffix for both the village and parish. The parish is "supposed to have taken its name from the whiteness of the church when new".

Roding-Alba, or White Roding in the 17th century was in the Archdeaconry of Middlesex, and the Deanery of Dunmow. St Martin's Church was a rectory appended to White Roding manor. The manor of White Roding was owned by Sir Richard Everard Bt., who was succeeded by John Le Neve who sold it on in 1717.

In 1296–97 Edward I granted the manor, and advowson (patronage) of the ecclesiastical parish, to John de Merks by tail-general (ownership not restricted to direct descendants of the previous owner, but passing to any of the owner's descendants if alive), and his sister, Cecily de Hastings, the wife of Humfrey de Hastings, who also held the manor of Cumbreton in Cambridgeshire. She died in 1304.

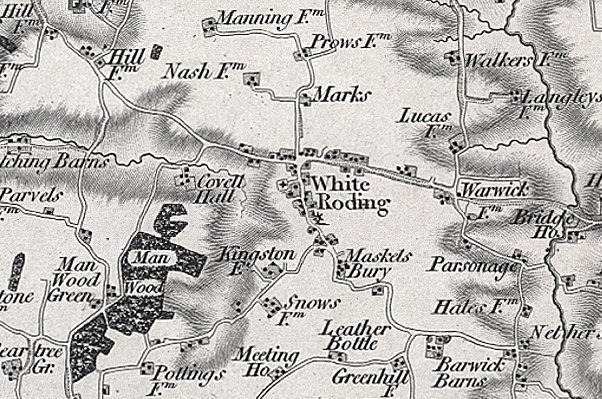
White Roding parish, Ordnance Survey map 1805

In 1307, the advowson of the parish was held by the Cusance family, and from 1322 to 1331 by Sir William Cusance. In 1350, the 23rd year of the reign of Edward III, the advowson was provided by the Quenton family, who in 1388 held both the manor and advowson, with ecclesiastical patronage by Sir William de Quenton in 1365 and 1373. Following Quenton, Sir Henry Green (c.1347 – 1399) of Drayton House in Northamptonshire held the manor and advowson, this until 1397. The following vacancy was filled by Sir Simon Felbrigg, and his wife, Katherine, she holding the advowson for three successive parish priests. This patronage was followed in 1469 by that of John Stafford, 1st Earl of Wiltshire (1427–1473), son to Humphrey Stafford, 1st Duke of Buckingham. John Stafford's wife, Constance, was the daughter and heir to the earlier patron, Sir Henry Green. After the death of Constance in c.1474, the guardians of her surviving children took the advowson of White Roding. The patronage was in the hands of Humfry Brown Serjeant-at-Law by 1532, who in 1537 alienated (transferred) by licence a third of White Roding manor to John Brown, who, the following year alienated it to Thomas Carew and John Knight. By 1557 the parish advowson was presented by George Brown, and in 1575, the sixteenth year of the reign of Elizabeth I, through in capite (held directly from Elizabeth), by Wiston Brown. Elizabeth probably granted the advowson to the following patron, John Harrington, in 1576. On 22 September 1617, the parish priest was presented through Sir John Leventhorpe, (c.1560–1625) 1st Baronet in 1622, and was the Rev Sir Charles Leventhorpe (1594–1680), who was priest for 63 years, and became the 5th Leventhorpe Baronet a year before his death. This advowson was given to Leventhorpe by Anthony Brown and Elizabeth his wife. The Brown family provided the patronage to the White Roding ecclesiastical parish until c.1702.

According to a terrier of 1622, White Roding included next to the churchyard a mansion house, a stable, a dove house, a malthouse, a kiln house, an orchard, a garden, and a "little hop garden". Glebe land, attached to the rectory, and directly supporting the incumbent and church, was of 45 acres (0.18 km^{2}) of arable and 5 acres (0.02 km^{2}) of pasture. Added to this land were the tithes to the church from the rest of the parish (tax income from parishioners derived from their profit on sales, or extraction of produce and animals, typically to the tenth part), and was expected from wheat, barley and oats as the tenth sheaf, peas produced on one tenth of ridges, hay to the fifteenth part, a tenth of calves or a tenth of the income if sold, but if less than ten calves existed, one calf with extra monies to bring the amount to what might be the tenth part. Every household with two milking cows would give nine cheeses yearly. The farmer at Camesse (Cammas Hall in Morell Roding), would give over "a piece of ground" to discharge his duty of a tithe of one field. A farmer at Leaden Hall (in Leaden Roding), had land in White Roding, being a piece of land at 'Uptrees', 6.5 acres (0.03 km^{2}) in 'Chesall Mead', and 12 acres (0.05 km^{2}) at the 'Homes'; he supplied cheeses to the number of his cattle. Other parish tithes were on apples and eggs, but not crab apples (wild apples), and on the seventh lamb and the seventh pig.

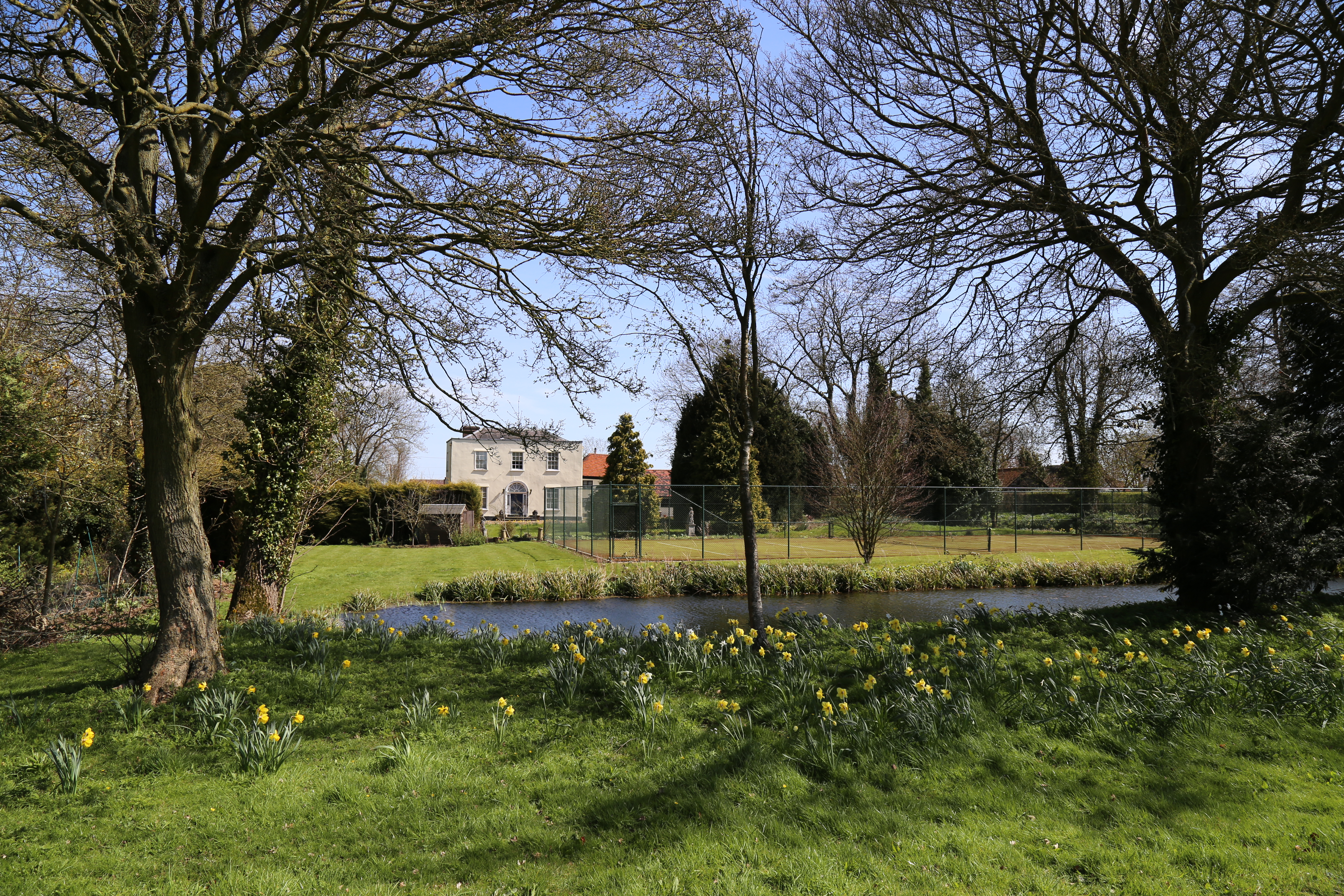
The parsonage and moat at White Roding

In 1800 Thomas Kitson Cromwell, Sylvanus Urban and Thomas Blount described White Roding variously as having two "good" shops, a mill, "besides two or three good farm houses". In the then parish area there were three manors: the first White Roding Bury (White Rodingbury), the second Maskel's Bury (Maskelsbury) and the third Morrell. White Roding Bury was near the church but with the manor house "some way off", the manor used for keeping 'lanar falcons', or hawks, for heron hawking from Michaelmas to the Purification (of the Virgin), this for the King's use. Maskel's Bury manor house (still existing) was about a furlong to the south from the church, the manor itself keeping greyhounds to flush herons during the King's hawking. The manor of Morrell, later absorbed into White Roding, became itself a parish. The Morrell parish church, now non-existent, was converted to a pigeon house. in 1800 the White Roding rector was the Rev Sir William Cheere of the Cheere baronetcy. St Martin's Church, now tiled, was once leaded. The tower contains five bells, and the spire is leaded. The church contains a monument to the memory of Rev John Maryon. The parsonage (dating from the 16th to 18th century and today Grade II listed), was moated almost all round (today only part of the south and west of the rectangular moat exists). Ralph Pettus, of the Pettus baronet family, who was a supporter of, and fought with Charles I during the English Civil War, consequently losing his estates in Magdalen Laver, 5 miles (8 km) south-west from White Roding, and later offered the same support for the returned Charles II, probably took up residence at White Roding after the restoration of the monarchy.

In the 19th century White Roding was still in the Dunmow Hundred, and its ecclesiastical parish was part of the Rural Deanery of Roding. From the 1830s White Roding was in the Dunmow Union – poor relief provision set up under the Poor Law Amendment Act 1834.

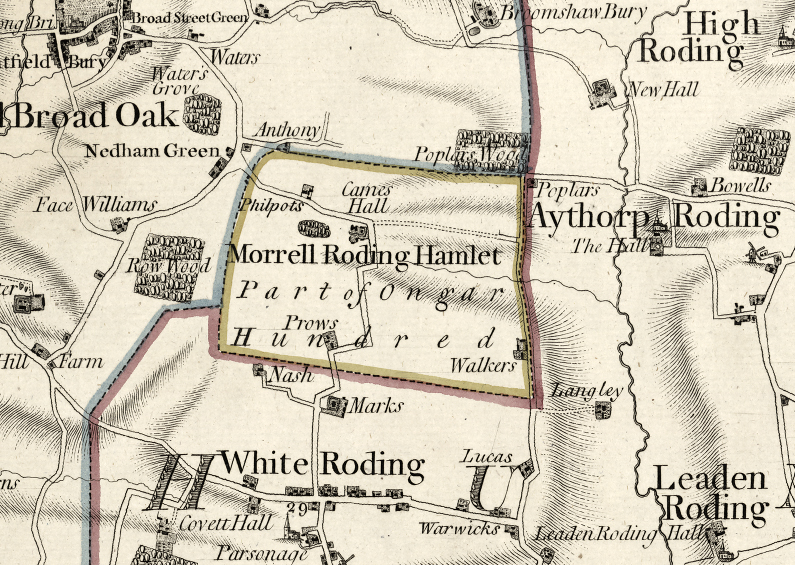
Chapman and Andre map 1777 showing Morrell Roding

In 1848, although in White Roding parish, Morrell Roding formed a separate township, and was a detached member of Ongar Hundred. White Roding included about 300 acres (1.21 km^{2}) of woods, roads, and wastes (non-cultivated land). The two manors of White Roding-bury, and Maskels-bury had a joint Lord of the manor. Colville Hall in the parish was bequeathed in 1701 "for the relief of poor widows and unfortunate seamen of Stepney". Further landholdings were held by Merks Hall estate (today Marks Hall), and several smaller owners, some copyhold tenants. In White Roding in 1848 was the Association for the Prosecution of Thieves. By 1882 there were two Lords of the Manor who were two of the four principal landowners. A principal landowner in 1894 was Major John Augustus Fane (1839–1908), of Barnes Common London, and son of Colonel John William Fane MP and Lady Ellen Catherine Parker, daughter to Thomas Parker, 5th Earl of Macclesfield (1763–1850).

Also in 1848 the rectory was in the patronage of John Maryon Wilson, with the incumbency including a residence and 64 acres (0.26 km^{2}) of glebe. The tithes had been commuted in 1839, for £600 per annum, under the Tithe Commutation Act 1836. The Church Land was about 4.5 acres (0.02 km^{2}), let for an income of £6.8s. By 1882 there was 80 acres (0.32 km^{2}) of glebe (reduced again to 56 acres (0.23 km^{2}) by 1894); this and the residence was in the gift of Sir Spencer Maryon Maryon–Wilson, 10th Baronet (1829–1897), who held the patronage until at least 1894, later transferred to Sir Spencer Pocklington Maryon-Wilson, 11th Baronet (1859–1944) by 1902. Two notable rectors of White Roding were John Maryon (c.1692 – 17 Nov 1760), ordained a deacon in 1714, and rector in 1710 and 1720; and John Ellerton (1826–1893), the hymn writer and hymnologist, rector of White Roding in 1886.

St Martins Church was restored in 1879 at cost of £1,700, which included the purchase of a new organ, and an added vestry, stalls for the chancel, and oak benches. The church contains 200 sittings. The parish register dates to 1547. In 1901 a memorial tablet to Queen Victoria was installed in the church, and in 1911, one to King Edward VII. A Congregational chapel opened in Jan 1888.

A School Board was formed on 14 March 1873 for a Public Elementary School for boys and girls, which was built the same year for 99 children. The school was controlled by the Essex Education (Dunmow District) Sub-Committee.

In 1848, parish land area measured 1,853 acres (7.50 km^{2}) (with Morrell Roding of one rood); in 1882 1,790 acres (7.24 km^{2}) (with Morrell Roding of one 830 acres (3.36 km^{2}); in 1894 and 1902 2,535 acres (10.26 km^{2}) (including Morrell Roding); and in 1914 2,540 acres (10.28 km^{2}) (including Morrell Roding). Crops grown at the time were chiefly wheat, barley and beans, on a heavy soil with a clay subsoil. Parish population in 1841 was 488 (Morrell Roding with 33); in 1881, 398 (Morrell Roding with 25); in 1891, 383 (with Morrell Roding); in 1901, 373 (with Morrell Roding); in 1911, 388 (with Morrell Roding).

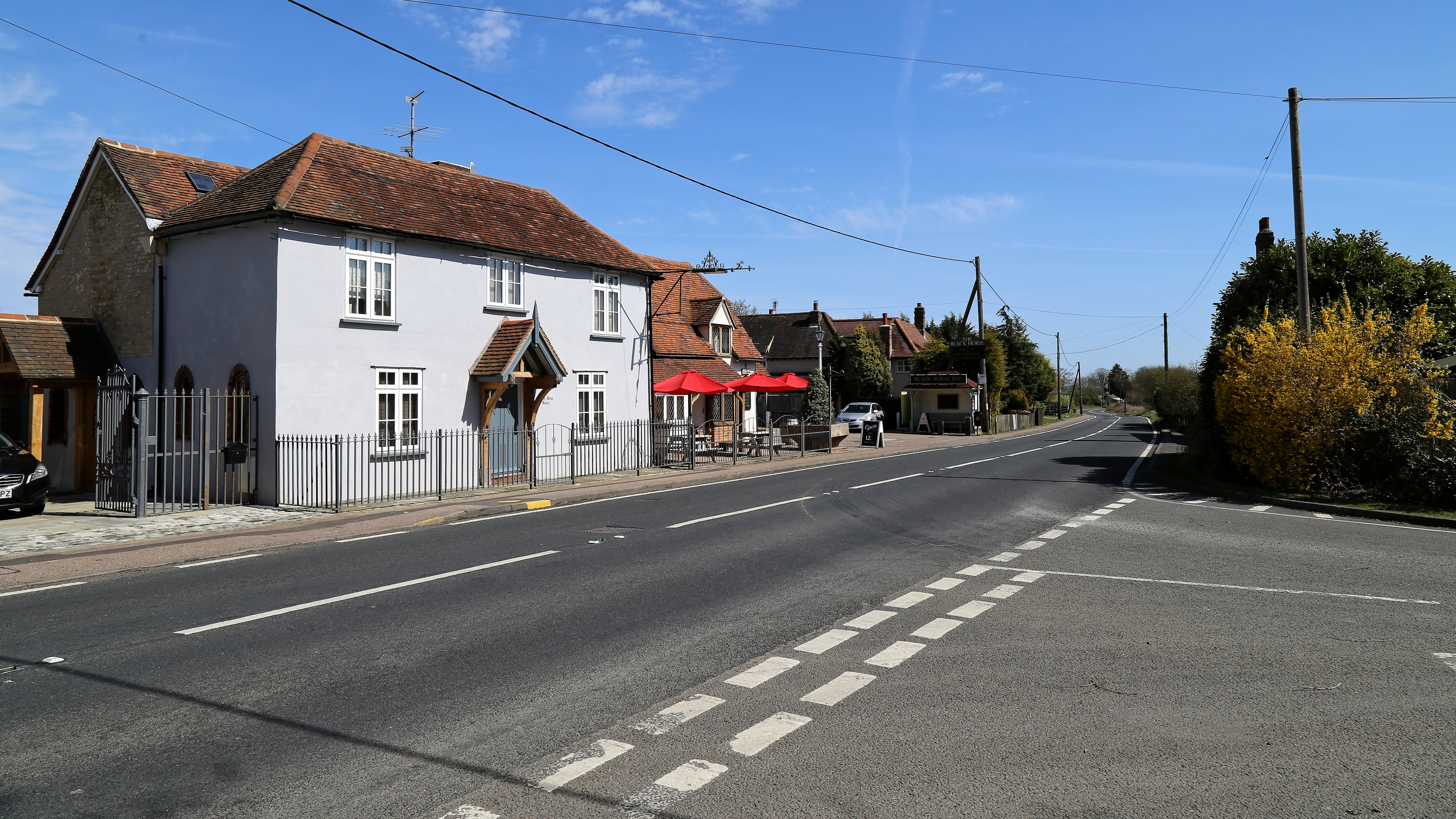
Black Horse Inn, White Roding

Parish occupations in 1848 included nine farmers, with two at Morrell Roding, one at Maskell's Hall, and another at Colville's Hall, a carpenter, a blacksmith, a shoemaker, two shopkeepers, a tailor, a grocer & draper, a miller & baker, two school teachers, and a relieving officer – a relieving officer visited those applying for assistance under poor law and assessed the type of relief needed, or whether or not relief should be given. By 1863 the number of parish farmers increased by one, but with only one at Morrell Roding. Only one teacher remained, and only one shopkeeper who was also listed as running a beer house. The shoemaker, blacksmith, grocer & draper, and tailor were still listed but the carpenter wasn't. There were extra occupations of a wheelwright, a bricklayer, and a surgeon. The relieving officer was also recorded as a registrar. In 1874 there were nine farmers, one of whom was listed at Cammas Hall, the centre of what was Morrell Roding. There were now two bricklayers and two grocers, one also a draper, the shop keeper & beer retailer, blacksmith, wheelwright, and shoemaker. A carter (probably a carrier) was also listed. Ten farmers were listed in 1882, two at Morrell Roding. Trades remained as in 1874, except that they were joined by a mason and a machinist. By 1894, of the now eleven farmers, one was also a stock farmer. Trades remained as previously, with extra listing for a plumber, a general dealer and a third bricklayer. The grocer & draper was also the sub-postmaster at the Post Office. The 1902 listings were as in 1894, except that one of the farmers was also a landowner. There were two wheelwrights in one company, and there was an addition of a butcher. In 1914 there was only one bricklayer, although other trades remained as before. New additions were a hay & straw merchant, and saddle-makers at Silcock Brothers saddlers. The licensed victuallers of the Black Horse and Whalebone public houses were listed in directories from at least 1848 to at least 1914, as were millers at White Roding corn mill, using both wind and steam by 1894.

== Community ==
White Roding Church of England parish church is dedicated to St Martin. The village public house is the Black Horse Inn. A further landmark is the remains of White Roding tower mill. Trades and services include a recreation ground with a sports and social club, a garage services autocentre, a butcher, a farm shop with restaurant, a flower shop, a barn wedding venue, and a catering equipment supplier. An anglers lake is within the site of Morrell Roding, and next to Cammasshall Wood.

== See also ==
- The Hundred Parishes
