= White Roding Windmill =

Windmill in White Roding, Essex, England

White Roding Mill
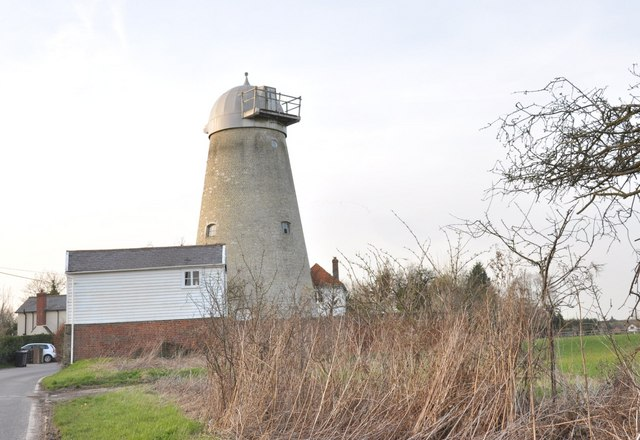
- The mill in 2009

Origin
- Mill name: White Roding Mill
- Mill location: TL 563 131
- Coordinates: 51°47′40″N 0°16′01″E
- Operator(s): Private
- Year built: 1877

Information
- Purpose: Corn mill
- Type: Tower mill
- Storeys: Five storeys
- No. of sails: Four sails
- Type of sails: Patent sails
- Windshaft: Cast iron
- Winding: Fantail
- Fantail blades: Six Blades
- Auxiliary power: Engine
- No. of pairs of millstones: Two pairs

White Roding Windmill is a Grade II listed preserved tower mill at White Roding, Essex, England.

== History ==
White Roding Windmill was built in 1877, replacing a post mill which had stood on the site since 1609. The post mill was destroyed on 1 January 1877 when the main post broke in a gale as the miller had too much cloth spread on the Common sails. A new tower mill was built by Whitmore's the Wickham Market, Suffolk millwrights to replace the post mill. The mill worked by wind until 1926, and then by engine until 1931. The lease on the mill expired that year and was not renewed. In 1937, the mill was purchased by the actor Michael Redgrave, passing to a company in Barrow-in-Furness in 1946. During the 1950s, the mill was derelict and threatened with demolition on more than one occasion. In the 1970s, millwrights Philip Barrett-Lennard and Vincent Pargeter built a new cap for the mill.

== Description ==
White Roding windmill is a five-storey brick tower mill which had an ogee cap winded by a six bladed Fantail. It had four Patent sails carried on a cast iron windshaft. The only remaining piece of machinery is the Brake Wheel, which is 9 feet 3 inches (2.82 m) diameter with 115 cogs. All other machinery was removed shortly after the Second World War.

The tower is 42 feet (12.80 m) high, 22 feet 6 inches (6.86 m) diameter at the base and 13 feet 6 inches (4.11 m) diameter at the curb. The walls are 26 inches (660 mm) thick at the base. The mill is 50 feet (15.24 m) to the top of the cap. The mill drove two pairs of underdrift millstones.

== Millers ==
- George Wilson 1830–1839 (post mill)
- William Portway 1845–1848
- John Dixon 1850
- Benjamin Roast 1855–1877
- Benjamin Roast 1877–1890 (tower mill)
- William and Frank Roast 1890–1917
- William Garner and Sons 1917 - 1936

Reference for above:-
