= Messing Maypole Mill =

Windmill in Tiptree, Essex, England

Tiptree Mill
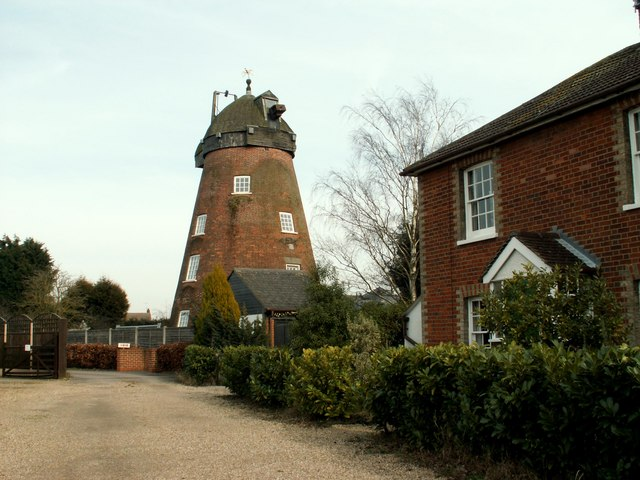
- The converted mill, March 2006

Origin
- Mill name: Messing Maypole Tree
- Mill location: TL 894 167
- Coordinates: 51°49′01″N 0°44′46″E
- Operator(s): Private
- Year built: 1775

Information
- Purpose: Corn mill
- Type: Tower mill
- Storeys: Four storeys
- No. of sails: Four sails
- Type of sails: Double Patent sails
- Windshaft: Cast iron
- Winding: Fantail
- Auxiliary power: steam engine, then electric motor
- No. of pairs of millstones: Three pairs

Messing Maypole Mill is a grade II listed Tower mill at Tiptree, Essex, England which has been converted to a residence. Prior to boundary changes made when the civil parish of Tiptree was established in 1934, the mill was in the parish of Tolleshunt Knights.

== History ==
Messing Maypole Mill was built in 1775 by Colchester millwright John Mathett at a cost of £315 excluding the brickwork. Matchett also rebuilt a post mill which stood some 190 yards (170 m) south west of the tower mill (TL 894 167) and sum of £315 may include that work. Matchett owned the mill until it was purchased by miller Thomas Green in 1797. The mill passed to Edward Harvey on Green's death in 1806. Harvey died in 1829 and in 1829 the mill was purchased by miller James Peake. Peake was declared bankrupt in 1845 and the mill sold by his assignees. George Ransom was the next miller, and he introduced steam power. After the death of Ransom in 1884 the mill was run by his widow for a few years and then by Henry Cattermole. In 1890, the Colchester millwright Bryant replaced the old wooden windshaft with the cast iron windshaft from the annular sailed mill at Roxwell. Bryant may have added the fantail at this time. Milling by wind ceased c1911. During World War I the mill was worked by steam alone. Frederick King put the mill back to full working order in the 1920s, but the sails were finally removed in February 1927, leaving just the stocks. Milling continued until at least 1962, although the millstones were removed in 1960. Power latterly was by electricity. The mill was converted into a residence in 1969.

== Description ==
Messing Maypole Mill is a four-storey brick tower mill with a domed cap. When built it had four Common sails carried on a wooden windshaft and was winded by hand. There was a stage at first-floor level. The tower is 27 feet 6 inches (8.38 m) diameter at base level, decreasing to 14 feet 6 inches (4.42 m) at curb level. Height of the tower is 42 feet 6 inches (12.95 m) to curb and the mill stands 55 feet (16.76 m) to the base of the finial on the cap, which was latterly winded by a fantail carried over the rear extension which housed the hand winding apparatus. The brickwork is 4 feet (1.22 m) thick at base level and 22 inches (560 mm) thick at curb level.

The 10 feet (3.05 m) diameter wooden Brake Wheel is of clasp arm construction, converted from compass arm. It has 72 cogs and is carried on a cast-iron windshaft which formerly carried four double Patent sails. The brake wheel drove a wooden Wallower carried on a 31 feet (9.45 m) long wooden Upright Shaft. The 9 feet 2 inches (2.79 m) diameter wooden Great Spur Wheel is of compass arm construction with 84 cogs. The mill latterly drove three pairs of millstones.

== Millers ==
- Thomas Green 1776–1806
- James Peake 1806–1848
- George D Ransom 1848–1884
- Mrs. Ransom 1884–1887
- Henry Cattermole 1887–c1911
- Frederick King 1922–1937

References for above:-
