= Stock Windmill =

Windmill in Stock, Essex, England

Stock Mill
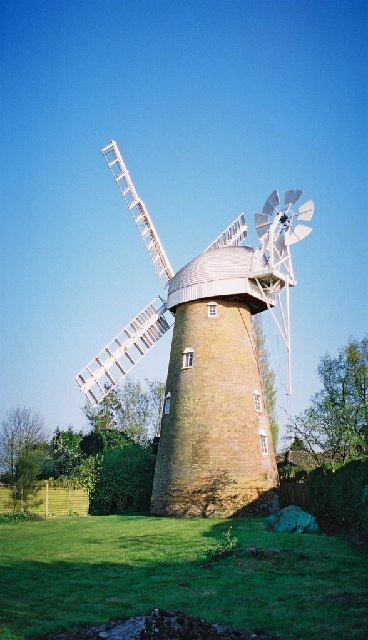
- The restored mill, June 2004
- Interactive map of Stock Mill

Origin
- Mill name: Stock Mill
- Grid reference: TQ 698 987
- Coordinates: 51.662°N 0.456°E
- Operator: Essex County Council
- Year built: c1816

Information
- Purpose: Corn mill
- Type: Tower
- Storeys: Five storeys
- No. of sails: Four sails
- Type of sails: Patent sails
- Windshaft: Cast iron
- Winding: Fantail
- Fantail blades: Six blades
- Auxiliary power: Internal combustion engine
- No. of pairs of millstones: Three pairs
- Size of millstones: 5 feet (1.52 m), 4 feet 7 inches (1.40 m) and 4 feet (1.22 m)

Stock Windmill is a grade II* listed tower mill at Stock, Essex, which has been restored.

== History ==
Stock Windmill was built circa 1816 joining an existing post mill. In 1845, a second post mill was moved to a site close by. By 1862, the mill had four shuttered sails. The two post mills were demolished c.1890, about which time the millstones were moved down a floor and the drive converted from underdrift to overdrift. A steam engine was added in 1902 and the mill was working by wind until 1930 and afterwards by an internal combustion engine until c.1936. The mill was bought by Essex County Council in 1945 and although preserved, by 1977 it was without the fantail and associated supporting timbers, and down to only one pair of sails. Major repairs were started in 1991 by Vincent Pargeter. A grant from English Heritage part-funded the work. The Friends of Stock Mill were formed in 1993 on completion of the restoration.

== Description ==
The mill is a five-storey tower mill with four single Patent sails It has a boat-shaped cap winded by a six-bladed fantail. The tower is 20 feet 6 inches (6.25 m) internal diameter at ground level and 12 feet 6 inches (3.81 m) internal diameter at curb level. The walls are 22 inches (560 mm) thick to first floor level and 18 inches (460 mm) thick above that. The tower is 40 feet (12.19 m) high overall and the mill is 52 feet (15.85 m) to the top of the cap.

As built, the mill had a stage at first-floor level, four common sails and was winded by hand. It originally drove two pairs of overdrift millstones.

The cast-iron windshaft was probably not made for the mill originally. It carries a 9 feet 4 inches (2.84 m) diameter composite brake wheel with 81 cogs which has been converted from clasp arm construction. This drives a cast-iron wallower with 25 teeth. The cast-iron upright shaft is 5 inches (130 mm) diameter and in three parts, with dog clutches at the fourth and fifth floor. The cast-iron great spur wheel is 5 feet (1.52 m) diameter with 76 cogs. It drove three pairs of underdrift millstones of 5 feet (1.52 m), 4 feet 7 inches (1.40 m) and 4 feet (1.22 m) diameter.

== Millers ==
- William Moss Sr 1816–
- William (Jr) & John Moss –1838
- William Moss Jr –1853
- John Pertwee 1863–66
- Joseph Clover 1870–90
- Mary Clover 1894–98
- William Mayes 1902–17
- Frank Semmens 1926–29

References for above:-

== Public access ==
Stock Windmill is open on the second Sunday of the month between April and September.
