= Rayleigh Windmill =

Windmill in Rayleigh, Essex, England

Rayleigh Mill
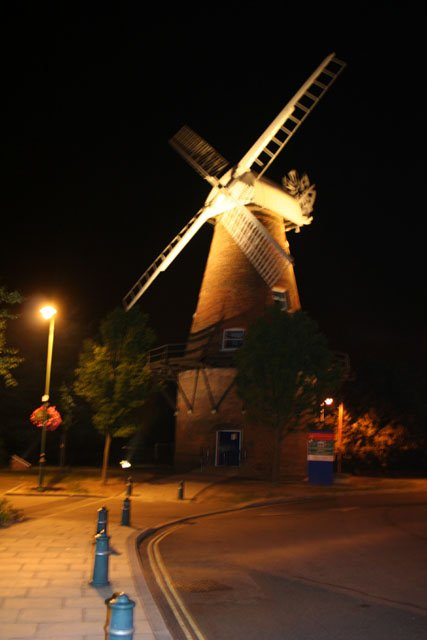
- The floodlit mill, July 2006
- Interactive map of Rayleigh Mill

Origin
- Mill name: Rayleigh Mill
- Mill location: TQ 807 910
- Coordinates: 51°35′17″N 0°36′25″E
- Operator: Rochford District Council
- Year built: 1809

Information
- Purpose: Corn mill
- Type: Tower mill
- Storeys: Six storeys
- No. of sails: Four sails
- Type of sails: Two Spring sails and two Common sails
- Windshaft: Cast iron
- Winding: Fantail
- Fantail blades: Six blades
- Auxiliary power: steam engine, then an oil engine, then an electric motor
- No. of pairs of millstones: Three pairs

Rayleigh Windmill is a grade II listed Tower mill at Rayleigh, Essex, England which has been restored as a landmark and is used as a museum.

== History ==
Rayleigh Windmill was built in 1809 for Thomas Higgs, a timber merchant of Rayleigh. Higgs was bankrupt in 1815 and the mill was sold to William Hart of Woodham Mortimer in 1817. Hart sold the mill to George Britton in 1845 and the mill passed to his sons John and Samuel in 1869. £150 was spent putting the mill into repair. The Britton brothers left Rayleigh in 1884 and were bankrupt in 1886. Thomas James Brown was the next miller, and the last to work the mill by wind c1907. The cap and sails were removed c1909 and the mill was worked by a steam engine then an oil engine and latterly by electric motor until at least 1937.

The mill was taken over for use as a museum by Rayleigh and District Antiquarian and Natural History Society, formally opening on 16 May 1970. The capless mill stood for many years with a crenellated top but in 1972 Rayleigh Urban District Council launched an appeal to restore the mill as a landmark. By the autumn of 1974 a new cap and sails had been made and fitted by millwrights John Lawn and Philip Barrett-Lennard.

In 2005, restoration work costing £340,000 was funded by the Thames Gateway South Essex Partnership.

== Description ==
Rayleigh Windmill is a six-storey tower mill with a Kentish cap winded by a six-bladed fantail. The mill had two single Spring sails and two Common sails carried on a cast-iron windshaft. The tower has no batter until second-floor level, where the stage is. The tower is 20 feet (6.10 m) diameter at base level and 11 feet (3.35 m) internal diameter at the curb. The brickwork is 4 feet 6 inches (1.37 m) thick at base level and at curb level it is thickened out to 3 feet (910 mm). The mill is 60 feet (18.29 m) high to the top of the cap. The mill drove three pairs of millstones.

== Millers ==
- Thomas Higgs 1809 - 1817
- William Hart 1817 -
- Benjamin Ruffle 1840
- George Britton 1845–1869
- John & Samuel Britton 1869–1884
- Thomas James Brown 1884 -
- Green Bros 1937

References for above:-

== Public access ==
Rayleigh Windmill is open from April each year on Wednesdays, Saturdays and Sundays.
