= Duck End Mill, Finchingfield =

Windmill in Finchingfield, Essex, England

Finchingfield Mill
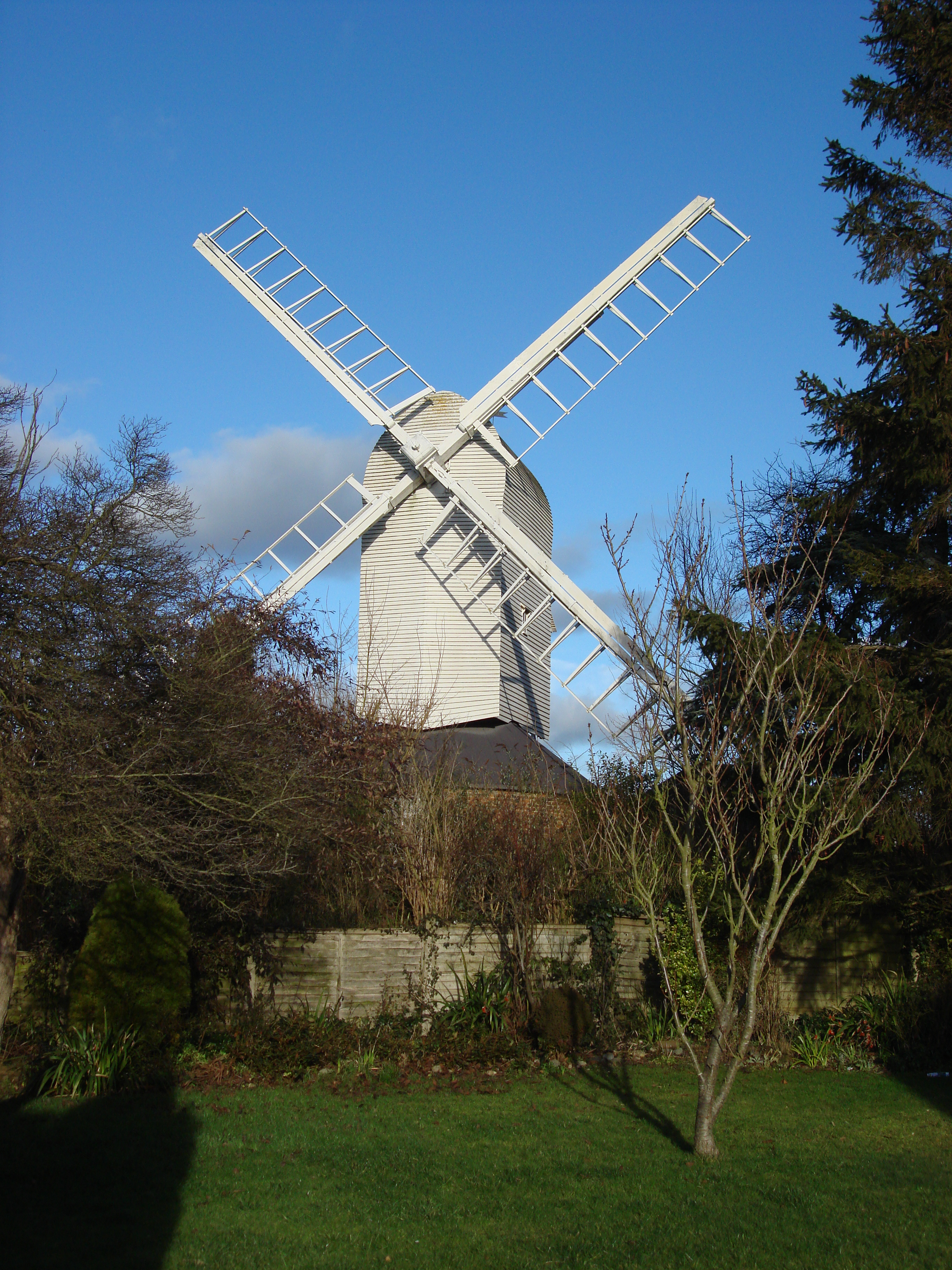
- The restored mill, January 2008

Origin
- Mill name: Duck End Mill; Letch's Mill
- Mill location: TL 687 329
- Coordinates: 51°58′08″N 0°27′14″E
- Operator(s): Essex County Council
- Year built: Mid-18th century

Information
- Purpose: Corn mill
- Type: Post mill
- Roundhouse storeys: Single storey roundhouse
- No. of sails: Four sails
- Type of sails: Spring sails
- Windshaft: Wood
- Winding: Tailpole
- No. of pairs of millstones: One pair

Duck End Mill, Letch's Mill or Finchingfield Post Mill is a grade II listed Post mill at Finchingfield, Essex, England which has been restored.

== History ==
Duck End Mill was built in the mid eighteenth century, dates of 1756, 1760 1773 and 1777 being recorded in the mill. It was originally built as an open trestle mill, the roundhouse being added in 1840. The mill was insured for £50 in 1790 and £100 in 1794. The mill was working until c. 1890, and had an all wood windshaft to the last. This was replaced by the cast iron one from Gainsford End Mill, Toppesfield in the 1950s. A replacement wooden windshaft has since been fitted.

== Description ==
Duck End Mill is a post mill with a single storey roundhouse. The mill is winded by a tailpole. It has four Spring sails. There was one pair of millstones, driven by an 8 feet 8 inches (2.64 m) Brake Wheel. The body of the mill measures 16 feet 6 inches (5.03 m) by 10 feet (3.05 m) in plan.

== Millers ==
- Samuel Stammers 1790 - 1807
- Edward Stammers 1807 - 1817
- Edward Letch 1817 - 1852
- Edward Letch Jr 1852 -
- Andrew Luke Letch -1890

References for above:-

== Public access ==
The mill is open to the public on the one Sunday of each month in the summer.
