= Clavering Windmills =

Windmills in Clavering, Essex, England

North Mill, Clavering
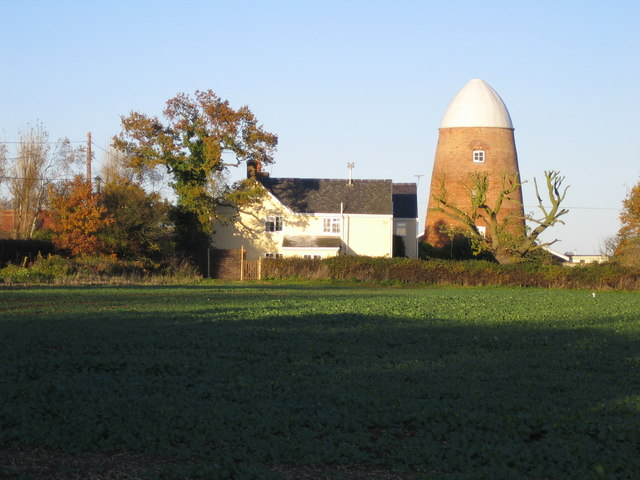
- North Mill, November 2006
- Interactive map of North Mill, Clavering

Origin
- Mill name: North Mill
- Grid reference: TL 466 328
- Coordinates: 51.974°N 0.136°E
- Operator: Private
- Year built: 1811

Information
- Purpose: Corn mill
- Type: Tower mill
- Storeys: Five storeys
- No. of sails: Four sails
- Type of sails: Single Patent sails
- Auxiliary power: Oil engine
- No. of pairs of millstones: Three pairs

South Mill, Clavering
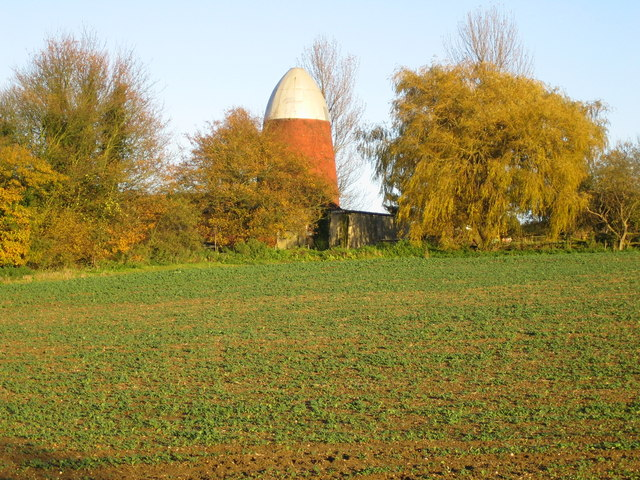
- South Mill, November 2006
- Interactive map of South Mill, Clavering

Origin
- Mill name: South Mill
- Grid reference: TL 465 326
- Coordinates: 51.973°N 0.133°E
- Operator: Private
- Year built: 1757

Information
- Purpose: Corn mill
- Type: Tower mill
- Storeys: Four storeys
- No. of sails: Four sails
- Type of sails: Spring sails
- Winding: Fantail
- No. of pairs of millstones: Two pairs

Clavering Windmills are a pair of Grade II listed Tower mills in Clavering, Essex, England. They have both been converted to residential use. They are named North Mill and South Mill. A third mill existed in Clavering until the mid-nineteenth century, known as Clavering Mill.

== History ==
=== Clavering Mill ===
Clavering Mill was a Post mill. It was marked on a map dated c.1625 and then in the ownership of Sir Francis Barrington. In 1702 it was conveyed to Sir Charles Barrington. The mill was marked on Warburton, Bland and Smyth’s map of 1724. It was marked on a plan of Clavering dated 1783 and also on the 1840 Tithe map of Clavering. White’s Directory of 1848 records three millers in Clavering, the last date at which the post mill can be assumed to have been standing.

=== North Mill ===
North Mill was built for James Pavitt in 1811, working in conjunction with the post mill until 1845. A 16 horsepower (12 kW) oil engine was installed in 1919 by Thomas Hunt, the Soham millwright. The sails were removed about this time, but the mill worked by the engine for many years.

=== South Mill ===
South Mill was built in 1757. The mill was idle in 1906, but then put back to work by its new owner, William Caton. It worked by wind until autumn 1919 and the sails were removed the following spring. No auxiliary power was provided, the mill working by wind alone.

== Description ==
=== Clavering Mill ===
No details are known of this mill, although it would have had Common sails when built. It is not known whether there was a roundhouse or not.

=== North Mill ===
North Mill is a five-storey tower mill with a beehive cap, winded by a fantail. It had four Single Patent sails, which rotated clockwise. The Upright Shaft is wooden, as is the clasp arm Great Spur Wheel, which drove three pairs of millstones overdrift.

=== South mill ===
South Mill is a four-storey tower mill with a beehive cap with a gallery. It was winded by a fantail It had four Single Spring sails. The mill drove two pairs of French Burr millstones.

== Millers ==
Post

- William Hill 1702
- Thomas Nottage 1802
- James Pavitt 1804 - 1845

South

- Henry Salmon 1772 - 1804
- Henry Moore 1840–1850
- William Overill 1849
- Zachariah Livings 1861
- Robert Spencer 1871
- William Caton 1906 - 1919

North

- James Pavitt 1811–1845
- James Pavitt Jr 1845 - 1850
- Spencer 1879
- William Caton 1906 –
- A E Caton 1935

References for above:-
