= Bocking Windmill =

Windmill in Bocking, Braintree, England

Bocking Churchstreet Mill
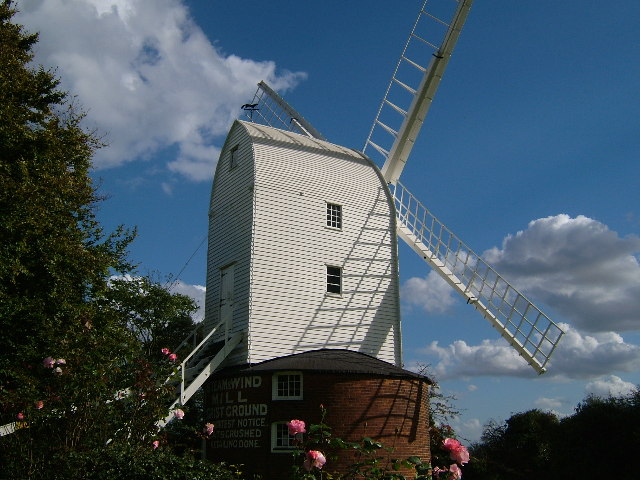
- The restored mill in September 2005
- Interactive map of Bocking Churchstreet Mill

Origin
- Mill name: Bocking Churchstreet mill
- Mill location: TL 763 260
- Coordinates: 51°54′14″N 0°33′47″E
- Operator: Friends of Bocking Windmill
- Year built: 1830

Information
- Purpose: Corn mill
- Type: Post mill
- Roundhouse storeys: Two storey roundhouse
- No. of sails: Four sails
- Type of sails: Two spring sails and two common sails
- Windshaft: Cast iron
- Winding: Tailpole
- Auxiliary power: Portable steam engine
- No. of pairs of millstones: Two pairs driven by wind, plus one pair driven by auxiliary power
- Other information

Listed Building – Grade I
- Designated: 25 October 1951
- Reference no.: 1122492

Bocking Windmill or Bocking Churchstreet Windmill is a grade I listed post mill at Bocking, Essex, England which has been restored.

== History ==
Although a build date of 1680 is often quoted, Bocking Windmill was actually built in 1721 at a position some 170 yards (160 m) to the west (TL 761 260 51°54′14″N 0°33′40″E) of its present site. The first mention of the mill was in an indenture dated 19 April 1721 where the lease of land that had been enclosed for the building of a windmill was sold to Joseph Nash, miller of Halstead for £11. The mill was marked on Warburton, Bland and Smyth's map dated c1724. The mill was conveyed to Joseph Nash Jr in April 1772, who promptly mortgaged the mill for £100. Thomas French, miller of Halstead, purchased the mill for £135 on the death of the mortgagee c1734. French sold the mill in 1774 to Bartholomew Brown, of Wethersfield for £170. In 1784 John Tabor loaned £100, with the mill as security. The mill was to be run by the Brown family for three generations, ending with John Brown who died in September 1829.

In 1830 the mill was taken down and removed from its original site "near The Bull" to its new site opposite the pub. The mill and pub were both in the occupation of John Brown the Younger. The mill at this time had one pair of French burr stones and a flour dresser. It is thought that the mill was modernised about this time. In 1837, Brown paid £6 8s for a new sail that was 31 feet 6 inches (9.60 m) long, and a further 6s for a shutter bar, indicating that the mill had a pair of spring sails by that time. In 1842, millwright Robert Hunt installed a new "right up shaft" (upright shaft) at a cost of £5. In 1850, the mill was in the occupation of William Dixon. Later millers were Henry Playle, James Hicks and Henry Hawkins. The mill was working until the First World War. the mill worked commercially until around 1924 and to order for a few years after that.

In 1929, the mill was presented to Bocking Parish Council by its owner, Edward H Tabor. With the help of the clerk, Alfred Hills, over £400 was subscribed and the mill was repaired at a cost of £225, with the rest of the money being invested to raise a maintenance fund of £5 annually. In the early 60s, the mill was derelict. Braintree and Bocking Urban District Council launched an appeal, and undertook to match pound-for-pound any money raise, with the aim of raising £2,500 in total. F J Bearman, a director of Tottenham Hotspur Football Club donated 50 Guineas. The mill was restored again in 1964 and officially reopened in November of that year. The Friends of Bocking Windmill was formed to ensure the mill's preservation.

== Description ==
Bocking Windmill is a post mill with a two-storey roundhouse. It has two common sails and two spring sails carried on a wooden windshaft. Two pairs of millstones are located in the breast. The mill is winded by a tailpole. The mill is 43 feet (13 m) high to the roof.

=== Trestle and roundhouse ===
The trestle is of oak. The crosstrees are 22 feet (6.7 m) long, of normal section. (Note: The normal section for the crosstrees would be 12 inches (305 mm) square.) The main post is 18 feet (5.5 m) in length, and 28 inches (710 mm) square at its base and 20 inches (510 mm) diameter at the top. The underside of the lower crosstree is 6 feet 6 inches (1.98 m) above ground level. The roundhouse is of brick, with a boarded roof covered in tarred felt. A pair of underdrift millstones is located on the upper floor of the roundhouse, these were driven via a portable steam engine in times of calm. The roundhouse was originally built as a single-storey structure, it and the mill being raised a storey at a later date.

=== Body ===
The body of the mill measures 18 feet 6 inches (5.64 m) by 11 feet (3.4 m) in plan. The balance of the mill has been changed at some point, with the position the crown tree meets the side girts has been changed, being some 9 inches (230 mm) to the rear of its former position. This was probably done after 1830, as a result of the doubling the number of millstones in the breast. The increased weight would have made the mill headsick. The crowntree is 21 inches (530 mm) by 19 inches (480 mm) in section, whilst the side girts are 9 inches (230 mm) by 16 inches (410 mm) in section.

=== Sails and windshaft ===
The windshaft is of cast iron, replacing a former wooden one. It was probably secondhand when fitted as it is longer than is really necessary. The mill has four double Patent sails. The mill would originally have been built with Common sails and a wooden windshaft. The sails have a span of 60 feet (18.29 m) and are 6 feet (1.83 m) wide.

=== Machinery ===
The brake wheel has been converted from compass arm construction to clasp arm construction, it is 7 feet 8 inches (2.34 m) diameter with 63 cogs. The mill was originally built with a single pair of millstones in the breast, but now has two pairs. The upright shaft is cast iron, and carries three wheels. There is a cast iron mortice wheel with 66 cogs drives a flour dresser. The wallower is an iron mortice gear with 24 cogs, and the spur wheel is also an iron mortice gear, with 63 cogs. The stone nuts have 20 cogs each.

== Millers ==
Millers at Bocking included:

- Joseph Nash 1721–1733
- Joseph Nash Jr 1733
- Thomas French c1738–1774
- Bartholomew Brown 1774–
- Brown
- John Brown –1829
- John Brown Jr 1829–1837
- William Dixon 1850–1863
- Henry Playle 1874
- James Hicks 1890
- Henry Hawkins 1912–1924
