= List of museums in Essex =

This list of museums in Essex, England contains museums which are defined for this context as institutions (including nonprofit organizations, government entities, and private businesses) that collect and care for objects of cultural, artistic, scientific, or historical interest and make their collections or related exhibits available for public viewing. Also included are non-profit art galleries and university art galleries. Museums that exist only in cyberspace (i.e., virtual museums) are not included.

== Museums ==
Name	Image	Town/City	Region	Type	Summary
Art Exchange		Colchester	Colchester	Art	part of the University of Essex, international, contemporary art by established and emerging artists, historic figures who continue to inspire, and group shows
Ashdon Museum		Ashdon	Uttlesford	Local	local history, trades, agriculture, social history
Audley End House		Saffron Walden	Uttlesford	Historic house	Operated by English Heritage, early 17th-century country house, finely furnished rooms, masterpieces by Hans Holbein and Canaletto, 1880s period servant's wing, gardens
Aythorpe Roding Windmill		Aythorpe Roding	Uttlesford	Mill	Late 18th century windmill
Barleylands Farm Museum		Billericay	Basildon	Agriculture	Early farm machinery and tractors, tools, household implements, farm and animals
Beecroft Art Gallery		Southend-on-Sea	Southend-on-Sea	Art	Collection ranges from 17th-century Dutch paintings to contemporary work
Bocking Windmill		Bocking	Braintree	Mill	Early 18th century windmill
Bourne Mill, Essex		Colchester	Colchester	Mill	operated by the National Trust, Elizabethan water mill
Boxted Airfield Museum		Langham	Colchester	Military	history of RAF Boxted in WWII
Bragg's Mill		Ashdon	Uttlesford	Mill	Mid 18th century windmill
Braintree Museum		Braintree	Braintree	Multiple	local history, industry, textiles, ceramics and art, and "The Essex Model House" by St Osyth Mahala Wood
Brentwood Museum		Brentwood	Brentwood	Local	
Brightlingsea Museum		Brightlingsea	Tendring	Local	local history, Roman life, shipbuilding, oyster industry
Burnham-on-Crouch & District Museum		Burnham-on-Crouch	Maldon	Local	Local history, maritime, agricultural, industrial and social history
Canvey Island Heritage Centre		Canvey Island	Castle Point	Local	
Canvey Island Transport Museum		Canvey Island	Castle Point	Transportation	automobiles, buses, commercial, military and emergency vehicles, public road transport artifacts, model train layout; located in a former bus depot
Cater Museum		Billericay	Basildon	Local	local history, period rooms
Chelmsford Museum		Chelmsford	Chelmsford	Multiple	Local history, art, archaeology, natural history, industry
Coalhouse Fort		East Tilbury	Thurrock	Military	19th century Victorian coastal defence fort open on specified days, includes military museums and vehicles
Coggeshall Grange Barn		Coggeshall	Colchester	Agriculture	operated by the National Trust, 14th century barn built for Coggeshall Abbey, collection of farm tools and equipment
Coggeshall Museum		Coggeshall	Colchester	Local	local history, industry, agriculture, culture, lace
Colchester Castle Museum		Colchester	Colchester	History	Norman castle with exhibits of local history, archaeology and Roman history
Colne Valley Postal History Museum		Halstead	Braintree	Philatelic	British Post Office letter boxes, stamp vending machines, documents, postal uniforms and associated artefacts, open by appointment
Colne Valley Railway		Sible Hedingham	Braintree	Railway	Heritage railway, 7¼" miniature railway, exhibit centre with history and artefacts, rare breed farm, located at Castle Hedingham Station
Combined Military Services Museum		Maldon	Maldon	Military	Combat equipment and weaponry used by the British armed forces from medieval times to the present, lifestyles of the troops, uniforms, Secret Service, artifacts, vehicles
Copped Hall		Waltham Abbey	Epping Forest	Historic house	Georgian mansion under restoration, gardens
Cressing Temple		Cressing	Braintree	History	Medieval barns and well used by temple of the Knights Templar, Tudor walled garden, early 17th-century house, granary and court hall
Duck End Mill		Finchingfield	Braintree	Mill	Mid 18th century windmill
Dutch Cottage Museum		Canvey Island	Castle Point	Historic house	operated by the Benfleet and District Historical Society
Earls Colne Heritage Museum		Earls Colne	Braintree	Local	local history
East Anglian Railway Museum		Chappel	Colchester	Railway	Heritage railway and museum, includes equipment, station buildings, signal boxes, goods shed and restoration shed
East Essex Aviation Society and Museum		St Osyth	Tendring	Military	located in a Martello tower, military artifacts, items recovered from local aircraft crash sites
Epping Forest District Museum		Waltham Abbey	Epping Forest	Local	local history, archaeology, history of the abbey, medieval and Tudor artifacts, Victorian life
Epping Signalling Museum		Epping tube station	Epping	Railway	Museum of London Underground history, includes ex-London Underground locomotive, memorabilia, restored signal cabin with working levers
Essex Fire Museum		Grays	Thurrock	Firefighting	
Essex Police Museum		Chelmsford	Chelmsford	Law enforcement	history of Essex Police from 1840 to present day, Victorian jail cell
Essex Regiment Museum		Chelmsford	Chelmsford	Military	Regimental history and memorabilia, located at the Chelmsford Museum
Feering and Kelvedon Local History Museum		Kelvedon	Braintree	Local	local history, archaeology, agriculture, trades
Finchingfield Guildhall		Finchingfield	Braintree	Local	15th century guildhall under restoration, houses the Finchingfield Heritage Center and Finchingfield Library
Firstsite		Colchester	Colchester	Art	Contemporary visual arts centre and gallery
Frinton's Crossing Cottage, Garden and Railway Museum		Frinton-on-Sea	Tendring	Local	operated by the Frinton & Walton Heritage Trust, local and area railroad history
Fry Art Gallery		Saffron Walden	Uttlesford	Art	Emphasis on local artists, includes paintings, prints, illustrations, wallpapers and decorative designs by artists of the 20th century and the present
Gibberd Gallery		Harlow	Harlow	Art	changing exhibits and Frederick Gibberd collection of British watercolours and drawings, operated by The Harlow Art Trust
Great Bardfield Cottage Museum		Great Bardfield	Braintree	Local	information, local history
Great Dunmow Museum		Great Dunmow	Uttlesford	Local	local history, industry, culture
Halstead Heritage Museum		Halstead	Braintree	Local	local history, culture, transport, operated by the Halstead & District Local History Society
Harlow Museum		Harlow	Harlow	Local	walled gardens, local history, Roman era & artifacts, Tudor life, Victorian household items, toys
Harwich Lifeboat Museum		Harwich	Tendring	Maritime	operated by the Harwich Society, information, located in a former lifeboat station with exhibits about sea rescues
Harwich Maritime Museum		Harwich	Tendring	Maritime	operated by the Harwich Society, located in a decommissioned lighthouse, nautical artifacts, information
Harwich Redoubt		Harwich	Tendring	Military	Napoleonic fort, operated by the Harwich Society
Hedingham Castle		Castle Hedingham	Braintree	Historic house	Medieval Norman keep and grounds
Hill Hall		Epping	Epping Forest	Historic house	Operated by English Heritage, Elizabethan mansion, tours by appointment
Hollytrees Museum		Colchester	Colchester	Local	Local history, toys, costumes
Hylands House		Chelmsford	Chelmsford	Historic house	Restored 18th century Queen Anne style house, park and gardens
Ingatestone Hall		Ingatestone	Brentwood	Historic house	16th century Tudor house and grounds
John Webb's Mill		Thaxted	Uttlesford	Mill	Early 19th century windmill
Kelvedon Hatch Secret Nuclear Bunker		Kelvedon Hatch	Brentwood	Military	Underground bunker used during the Cold War as a regional government headquarters
Langdon Visitor Centre & Haven Plotlands Museum		Basildon	Basildon	Multiple	Natural history of the nature reserve, also Haven Plotlands Museum, a 1930s period bungalow country getaway
Layer Marney Tower		Colchester	Colchester	Historic house	16th century Tudor palace and gardens
Little Baddow History Centre		Little Baddow	Chelmsford	Local	
Maeldune Centre		Maldon	Maldon	Local	Local history, art, modern large embroidery about the Battle of Maldon
Maldon District Agricultural & Domestic Museum		Maldon	Maldon	History	information, vintage farm machinery and equipment, agriculture tools, household items
Maldon Museum		Maldon	Maldon	Local	also known as Museum in the Park, located in a park keeper's lodge
Mangapps Railway Museum		Burnham-on-Crouch	Maldon	Railway	Heritage railway and museum, includes rolling equipment, memorabilia, buildings
Manningtree Museum		Manningtree	Tendring	Local	local history
Mersea Island Museum		Mersea Island	Colchester	Local	fishing, oystering, wild fowling, boat building, local history, natural history, geology
Minories Art Gallery		Colchester	Colchester	Art	Part of the Colchester Institute
Mountnessing Windmill		Mountnessing	Brentwood	Mill	Early 19th century windmill
Munnings Art Museum		Dedham	Colchester	Art	Home and works of Sir Alfred Munnings, located in Castle House
Museum of Power		Langford	Maldon	Technology	Located in a water pumping station, features working examples of steam engines, machinery, equipment and tools, miniature railway
Natural History Museum, Colchester		Colchester	Colchester	Natural history	natural heritage of north-east Essex
Naze Tower		Walton-on-the-Naze	Tendring	Natural history	Tower with viewing platform, museum about the ecology and environment of the Naze headland, art gallery
Nazeing Glass Museum of 20th Century British Domestic Glass		Nazeing	Epping Forest	Art	works and history of Nazeing Glass Works and other British glass manufacturers in the 20th century
North Weald Airfield Museum		North Weald Bassett	Epping Forest	Military	History of the former military airfield
Nottage Maritime Institute		Wivenhoe	Colchester	Maritime	maritime paintings, photographs, models and artifacts
Paycocke's		Coggeshall	Colchester	Historic house	operated by the National Trust, early 16th-century house with elaborate paneling and woodcarving, garden
Peter Edwards Museum & Library		Chelmsford	Chelmsford	Sports	history and memorabilia of the Essex County Cricket Club, located at County Cricket Ground
Prittlewell Priory		Southend-on-Sea	Southend-on-Sea	Religious	Medieval priory
Purfleet Heritage & Military Centre		Purfleet	Thurrock	Military	located in a former Royal magazine for gunpowder, artifacts and memorabilia from all the armed forces
Rayleigh Town Museum		Rayleigh	Rochford	Local	Rayleigh, its people, places and heritage, oldest secular Building in town
Rayleigh Windmill		Rayleigh	Rochford	Mill	Early 19th century windmill
Ridgewell Airfield Commemorative Museum		Ridgewell	Braintree	Military	uniforms, artifacts, medals, memorabilia of the World War II airfield, the 381st Bomb Group and the No. 90 Squadron RAF
Royal Gunpowder Mills		Waltham Abbey	Epping Forest	Multiple	Complex includes science of gunpowder exhibits, history of the site, exhibits of weapons and military artifacts, transportation, rockets, 1940s street scene, history of the Gunpowder Plot, narrow gauge railway, woodlands
Saffron Walden Museum		Saffron Walden	Uttlesford	Multiple	local history, natural history, Ancient Egypt, archaeology, decorative arts, costumes, ethnographic artifacts
Sandford Mill		Chelmsford	Chelmsford	Science	area industrial history and the science involved, part of Chelmsford Museums
Southchurch Hall		Southend-on-Sea	Southend-on-Sea	Historic house	Early 14th century half-timbered medieval manor house with period rooms depicting life in different centuries
Southend Central Museum		Southend-on-Sea	Southend-on-Sea	Multiple	Local history, natural history, planetarium
Southend Pier Museum		Southend-on-Sea	Southend-on-Sea	Amusement	History of the Southend Pier, working penny slot machines
Stansted Mountfitchet Windmill		Stansted Mountfitchet	Uttlesford	Mill	Late 18th century windmill
Stock Windmill		Stock	Chelmsford	Mill	Early 19th century windmill
Thaxted Guildhall		Thaxted	Uttlesford	Historic house	14th century guild hall
The Time Machine		Harlow	Harlow	Science	hands-on science and technology exhibits
Thurrock Museum		Grays	Thurrock	Local	local history, culture, archaeology, industry, culture, social history
Tilbury Fort		Tilbury	Thurrock	Military	Operated by English Heritage, 17th century artillery fort
Walton Maritime Museum		Walton-on-the-Naze	Tendring	Maritime	former lifeboat station with maritime artifacts, local history, natural history, restore James Stevens 14 lifeboat, operated by the Frinton & Walton Heritage Trust
Warner Textile Archive		Braintree	Braintree	Textile	Archive of some 100,000 items relating to the textile industry in Braintree, in particular the legacy of Warner and Sons
Wilkin & Sons Visitor Centre		Tiptree	Colchester	Food	Tearoom, shop and museum of Wilkin & Sons jams and jam-making

== Defunct museums ==
- Motorboat Museum, Basildon; closed December 2009
- Southend Historic Aircraft Museum, Southend-on-Sea; closed May, 1983 [2]
- Tymperleys Clock Museum, Colchester, closed in 2010, clocks now at Hollytrees Museum
- Walton Hall Museum, Stanford-le-Hope, closed in 2010

== See also ==
- Visitor attractions in Essex
