= Listed buildings in Essex =

Protected structures in Essex, England

There are around 14,000 Listed buildings in Essex, which are buildings of architectural or historic interest.

- Grade I buildings are of exceptional interest.
- Grade II* buildings are particularly important buildings of more than special interest.
- Grade II buildings are of special interest.

The characteristic buildings of Essex are its medieval churches and timber-framed houses. A typical church is small and built of relatively modest materials. It may have a 16th-century brick tower or porch, but more often features a timber belfry. There are about 10,000 timber-framed houses in Essex, more than one third of which date from the 14th century to the 17th century. In medieval towns and villages, hall houses typically stood parallel to the street and consisted of a single-storey open hall. An upper floor or a brick chimney was often added in the 16th century. These buildings may be plastered or have their structural timbers exposed. Over time, increasing pressure on space led to plots being subdivided, and house plans were rotated by 90 degrees so that buildings faced the street gable-end on. These houses were often built to two or three storeys, compared with the earlier predominantly one two-storey forms. Smaller houses are often weatherboarded, either painted white or—particularly near the coast—tarred. In the late 15th and early 16th centuries, the long-wall jettied house was developed, characterised by a continuous first floor extending over the ground floor, with the jetty running along the entire street façade. Guildhalls erected by religious guilds were often timber-framed, long-wall jettied buildings, frequently located on the edge of churchyards. Examples for old timber-framed buildings in Essex are:

- Greensted Church, Greensted-juxta-Ongar – an ancient wooden church, with timbers dated to around 1053
- The Barley Barn, Cressing Temple – a medieval barn built for the Knights Templar, with timbers felled around 1220
- Grange Barn, Coggeshall, Coggeshall – a large timber-framed tithe barn built in the 13th century
- Fyfield Hall, Fyfield – a timber-framed aisled manor house, with timbers felled between 1167 and 1185
- Harlowbury, Old Harlow – retaining roof timbers and other elements dating to the 13th and 14th centuries

Examples for long-wall jettied houses are:

- Cann Hall, Clacton-on-Sea – a circa 1512 timber-framed house built for St Osyth's Priory, timber-framed and plastered with a continuous jetty on the south front
- Moone Hall, Stambourne – a manorial jettied timber-framed house in Stambourne, Essex, dating from the late 15th/early 16th century with a long-wall jetty along the façade

The lists follow Historic England’s geographical organisation, with entries grouped by county, local authority, and parish (civil and non-civil).

Local authority	Listed buildings list	Grade I	Grade II*	Grade II	Total	Map
Basildon	Listed buildings in the Borough of Basildon	2	12	111	125	
Braintree	Listed buildings in Braintree District	67	183	2,933	3,183	
Brentwood	Listed buildings in Brentwood	12	28	480	520	
Castle Point	Listed buildings in Castle Point	3	3	30	36	
Chelmsford	Listed buildings in Chelmsford	20	43	948	1,011	
Colchester	Listed buildings in Colchester	41	104	1,411	1,556	
Epping Forest	Listed buildings in Epping Forest District	15	85	1,227	1,327	
Harlow (non-civil parish)	Listed buildings in Harlow	5	9	165	179	
Maldon	Listed buildings in Maldon District	16	52	969	1,037	
Rochford	Listed buildings in Rochford District	1	17	312	330	
Southend-on-Sea (unitary authority)	Listed buildings in Southend-on-Sea	5	6	97	108	
Tendring	Listed buildings in Tendring District	19	45	906	970	
Thurrock (unitary authority)	Listed buildings in Thurrock	13	19	210	242	
Uttlesford	Listed buildings in Uttlesford	66	174	3,482	3,722	
Total (Essex)	—	285	780	13,281	14,346	—

== See also ==
- Grade I listed buildings in Essex
- Grade II* listed buildings in Essex

== Sources ==
- Bettley, James; Pevsner, Nikolaus (2007) [1954], Essex, The Buildings of England, New Haven and London: Yale University Press, ISBN 978-0-300-11614-4
