= Southchurch Park =

Park in Southend-on-Sea, England

Coordinates: 51.5329°N 0.7355°E

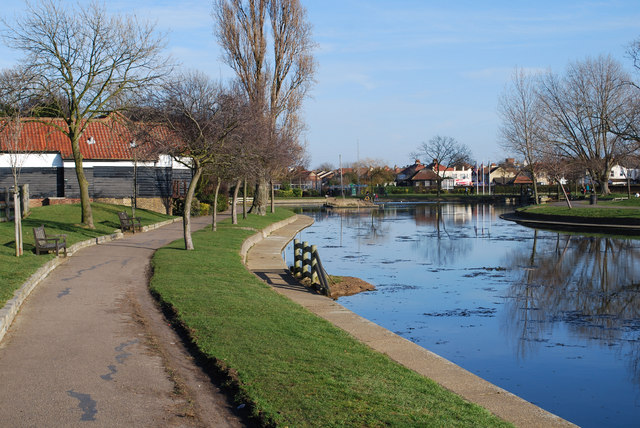
- Southchurch Park lake

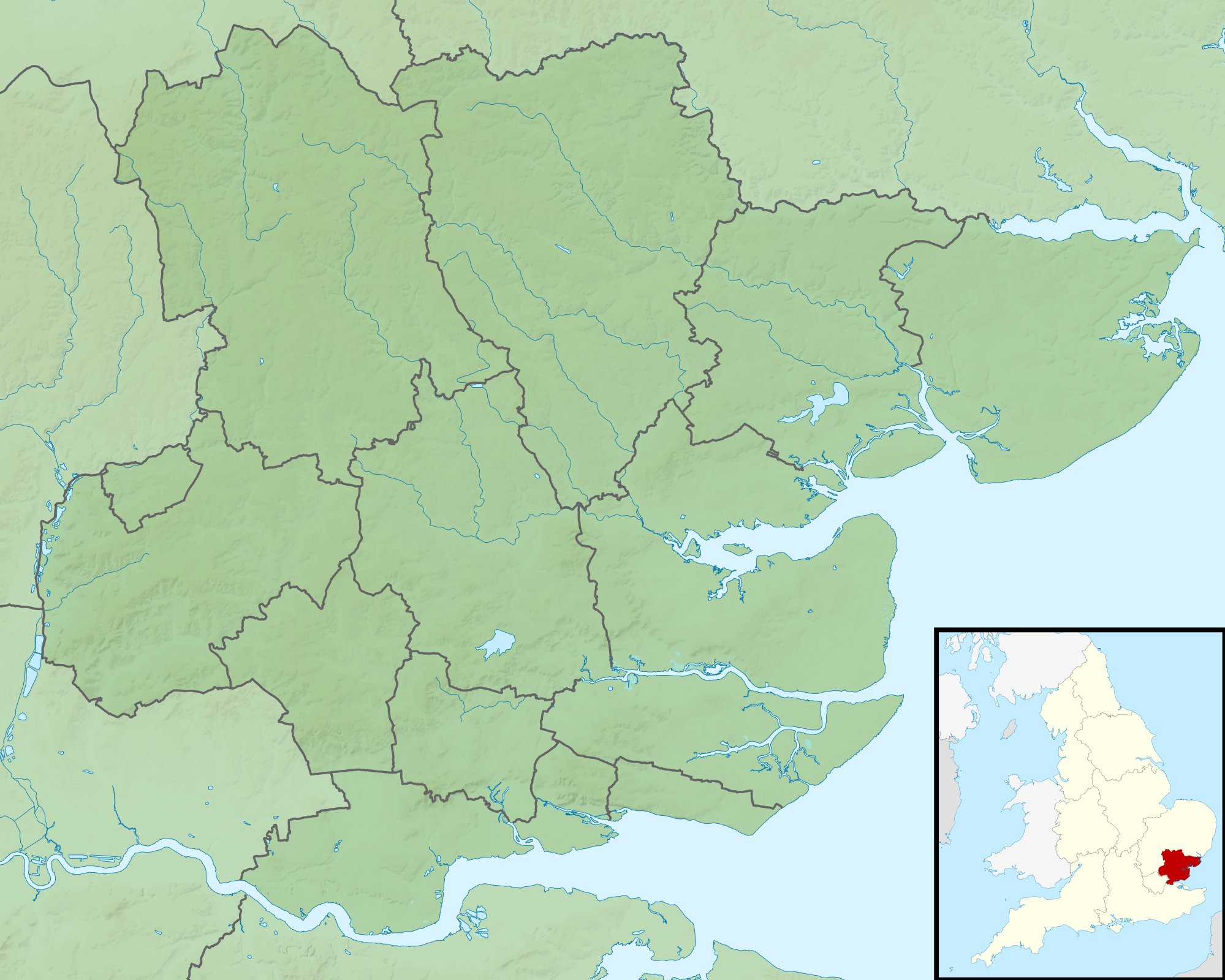
- Location within Essex
- Location: Southchurch, Southend-on-Sea, Essex, England
- Area: 12 hectares (30 acres)

Southchurch Park is a recreational park in Southchurch, a suburb in the city of Southend-on-Sea, Essex, England. The park is 12 hectares (30 acres) in area and contains sports pitches, including a cricket ground formerly used by Essex County Cricket Club, a football ground, formal gardens, a boating lake, tennis courts, a bowling green and a café. The park is split in two by Lifstan Way, with the original park on the West, and the 1931 extension on the East.

== History ==
The 20 acres of land were gifted to the town by local benefactors, Alderman Messrs Baxter, Dowsett and Ingram in 1895. The site was marshland, and with agreement of the benefactors, the council built pumping stations and the lake to drain the land for the park, but also what is now Southchurch Hall estate development, which was also owned by the benefactors. This work cost £10,000 and drew criticism at the time, and the park was formerly opened in 1900, and was originally called Southchurch Hall Park, with an entrance lodge and pavilion, with a further refreshment room being added in 1912. The lake was used for boating from 1903 until the 1990s, when vandalism, the cost of insurance and changes to health and safety rules saw it end. Until 1908, the park had partially been maintained by the Cricket club, but due to complaints about its upkeep, the council created the Parks and Pleasure committee to maintain all of the town's public parks. In 1910, the Parks department installed tennis courts, which were used by the Eastcliff Tennis Club, and for the first time allowed local football teams to play at the park. During 1913, the council added an Aviary to the park, which would grow to become a mini zoo by 1928.

In 1914, the park was requisitioned for use by Colonel Patton-Bethnal and the 14th Rifle Brigade with the stipulation that the hallowed cricket pitch not be touched. The park's name changed during the 1930s after the nearby Southchurch Hall and its gardens were gifted to the people of Southend by the Dowsett family, although the campaign to name the park after Thomas Dowsett, former mayor and one of the Park's benefactors failed to reach fruition. The park's cinder athletics track, installed during 1928 as part of a £2,000 investment that included a children's playground, was replaced as the city's only facility with the opening of Garon Park in 1996, with Southend-on-Sea Athletic Club moving to the new facility. Southchurch Park Bowls Club have been resident at the park since their formation in 1931, while in the same year, the land east of the original park was purchased from the Southend Estates Company for car parking, additional recreation ground and hosting fetes and shows. The east section of the park was previously home to the annual Southend Vintage Bus Rally that first ran in 1974, eventually becoming the Southend Bus and Transport show. In 2020, the original gravel car park in the east section of the park was relaid at the cost of £520,000, with the formerly free car park becoming a pay and display for non Southend residents.

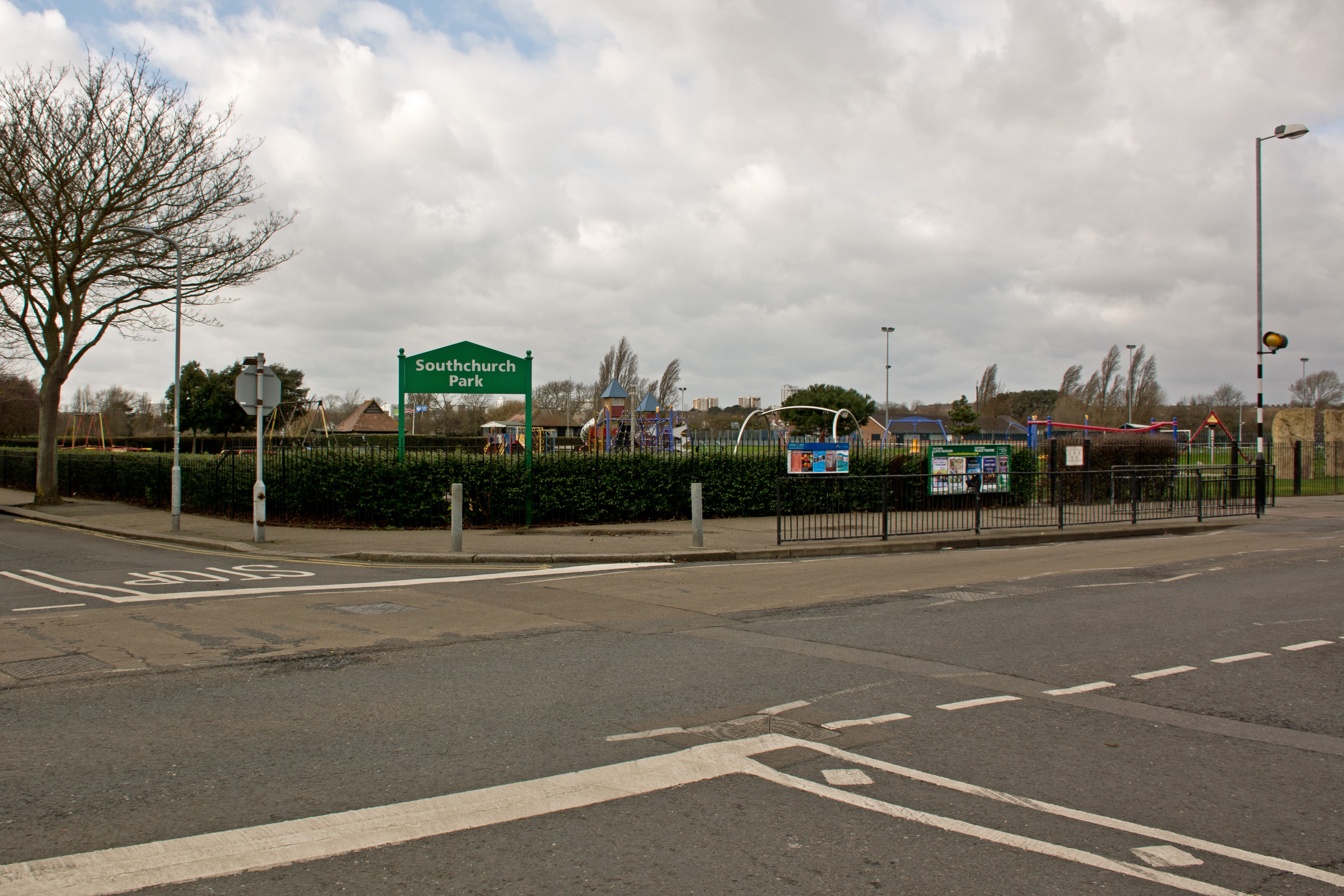
Southchurch Park on the corner of Lifstan Way and Shaftesbury Avenue

== Football Ground ==
The park is the home of the Eastern Counties Football League side Southend Manor F.C., and previously was ground shared in 2019 with Clapton F.C. after their eviction from Forest Gate. The ground, known as Southchurch Park Arena, is on the site of the former cinder athletics track. Improvements, including a new boundary fence and a new 100-person spectator stand, plus replacing the dug outs happened in 2022, after the club was threatened with expulsion from the league as it did not meet FA rules.

== Cricket ground ==
Southchurch Park
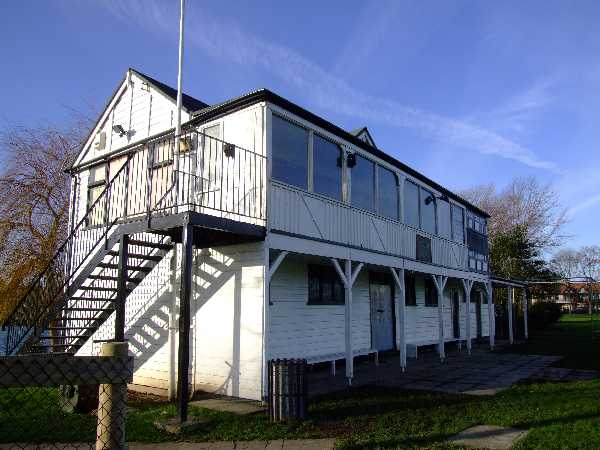
- The Pavilion at Southchurch Park, built 1929
- Interactive map of Southchurch Park

Ground information
- Location: Southend, Essex
- Country: England
- Establishment: 1899
- End names
- Northumberland Crescent End; Boating Lake End

Team information
Essex	(1906–1907, 1914–1964, 1966, 1968 & 1977–2004)
- As of 12 September 2010; Source: Cricket Grounds: Then & Now by William Powell

The ground was first used for cricket in 1899, prior to its formal opening, by the Southend Cricket Club, which had been formed in 1874. The ground is big enough for two club matches to be played at the same time, and had three cricket squares, with the central square being used exclusively by Essex.

The first recorded county cricket match on the ground was in 1906, when Essex County Cricket Club played their inaugural first-class match there, beating Leicestershire by five wickets. Initially the ground was known as "Paradise Lost" by cynical, as the ground was far from ideal and outfielders were known to find rubbish on the pitch in the early days.

Essex played 130 first-class matches at Southchurch Park between 1906 and 2004, playing their final first-class match there against Nottinghamshire in the 2004 County Championship.

In addition, the ground has also hosted List-A matches, the first of which came in the 1977 John Player League and saw Essex play Middlesex. From 1977 to 2004, the ground held 28 List-A matches, the last of which saw Essex play Northamptonshire in the 2004 totesport League.

The ground has also held 19 Second XI fixtures between 1972 and 1996 for the Essex Second XI in the Second XI Championship and Second XI Trophy.

The ground has hosted tourist matches, with the highest ever number of runs scored on one day occurred at Southchurch Park in a match between Australia and Essex on the 14 May 1948, when Australia scored 721 all out, with Don Bradman hitting 180 in front of 16,000 spectators, the record attendance at the ground. Prior to that, Tich Freeman achieved his second ten wicket haul for Kent against Essex in a County Championship match in 1930.

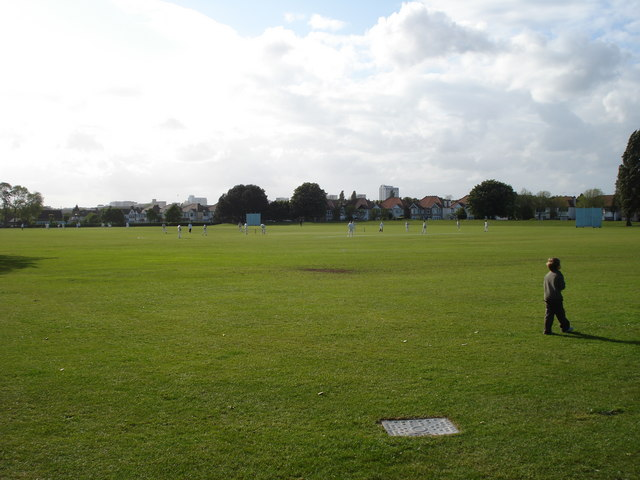

The pitch gained the reputation as a batman's nightmare, leading to cricket writer and broadcaster, John Arlott to pen the following:

Umpire or fieldsman or scoreboard clerk,

Bowler, spectator - Oh! Pause! - and hark! Above the crowd's cheer and the stray dogs bark, To cricket-field birdsong - perhaps the lark, Or the thrush or the magpie or the piebald mark, But batsman, oh batsman, be death to the dark, Ill-omented, cold-fear-breeding, run-killing stark,

Quack, quack of the ducks down at Southchurch Park

During World War II, the ground was used by military personnel at HMS Westcliff to play inter-departmental cricket.

The poor standard of the pitch was again brought into focus in 1988, when after a County Championship match where Essex beat Yorkshire, the authorities stripped Essex of 25 points. A year later it was announced that the groundsman of Essex would take over the maintenance of the central square.

In local domestic cricket, the ground is the home venue of Southend-on-Sea and EMT Cricket Club.

The ground was used in 1948 for an England international hockey match, but the game was called off after starting, due to fog.
