= Listed buildings in Castle Point =

Historic structures in Essex, England

There are 36 listed buildings in the Borough of Castle Point in south Essex, England which are buildings of architectural or historic interest.

- Grade I buildings are of exceptional interest.
- Grade II* buildings are particularly important buildings of more than special interest.
- Grade II buildings are of special interest.

== Listed buildings ==
The lists follow Historic England’s geographical organisation, with entries grouped by county, local authority, and parish (civil and non-civil). The following lists are arranged by parish.

Parish	List of listed buildings	Grade I	Grade II*	Grade II	Total
South Benfleet (non-civil parish)	Listed buildings in South Benfleet	3	3	25	31
Canvey Island	Canvey Island#Listed_buildings			5	5

== See also ==
- Grade I listed buildings in Essex
- Grade II* listed buildings in Essex
