= Holy Trinity Church, Southchurch =

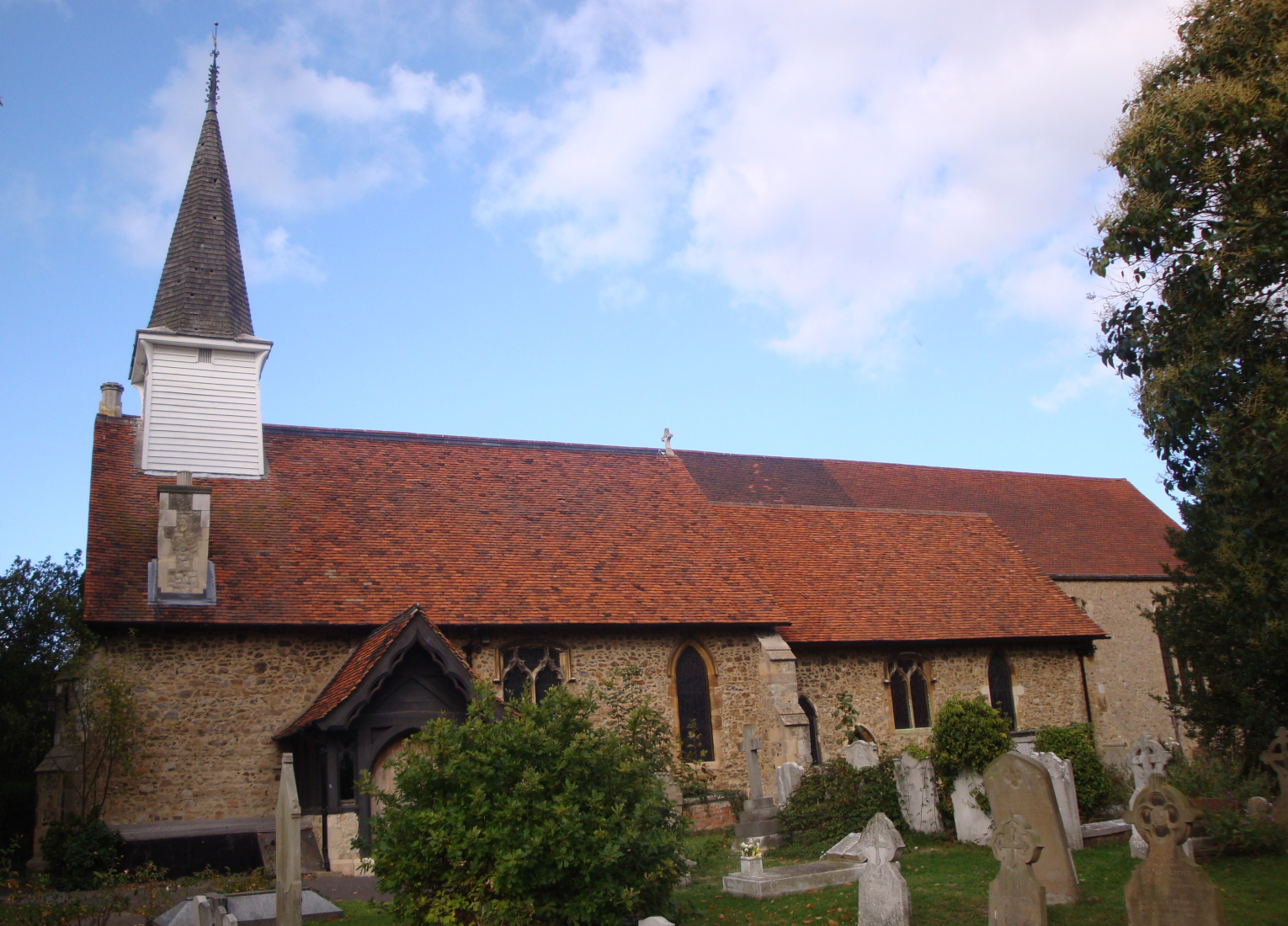
- Holy Trinity Church, Southchurch
- 51.5418°N 0.741°E
- Location: Southchurch Boulevard, Southend-on-Sea, Essex, SS2 4XA
- Country: England
- Denomination: Church of England

History
- Status: Active

Architecture
- Functional status: Parish church
- Heritage designation: Grade II* listed

The Church of the Holy Trinity is a Church of England parish church in Southchurch, Southend-on-Sea, Essex. The church is a grade II* listed building with the earliest parts dating to the Norman period.

== History ==
There was originally a wooden church on this site. It was replaced in 1150 by a stone church, and parts of this survive till today within the current building. The belfry was added in the 15th century.

The church was restored in 1857, and Victorian stained glass windows were added. The church was extended in 1906 by Sir Ninian Comper. A chancel was added by Frederick Charles Eden between 1931 and 1932.

On 23 November 1971, the church was designated a grade II* listed building. This grade designates "particularly important buildings of more than special interest" and is the second highest.

=== Present day ===
The parish of Southchurch is part of the Archdeaconry of Southend in the Diocese of Chelmsford.
