= Southchurch =

Inner city area of Southend-on-Sea in Essex, England

Coordinates: 51.5416°N 0.7383°E

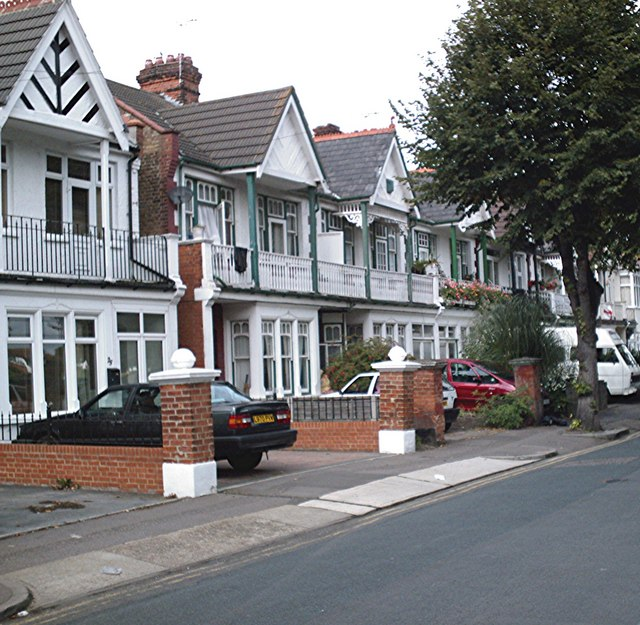

- Location within Essex
- Population: 9,710 (2011 Census. Southchurch Ward)
- OS grid reference: TQ893859
- Unitary authority: Southend-on-Sea
- Ceremonial county: Essex
- Region: East
- Country: England
- Sovereign state: United Kingdom
- Post town: SOUTHEND-ON-SEA
- Postcode district: SS2
- Dialling code: 01702
- Police: Essex
- Fire: Essex
- Ambulance: East of England
- UK Parliament: Rochford and Southend East

Southchurch is a suburb of the city of Southend-on-Sea in Essex, England. England. It was historically a separate village and parish. The parish was absorbed into the borough of Southend-on-Sea in 1897, since when Southchurch has been administered as part of Southend. It gives its name to one of the city's wards. In 2011 the ward had a population of 9,710.

== History ==
In 824 AD, a Saxon thegn, Leofstan presented the manor of Southchurch to the monks of Canterbury. It is possible that the church from which the manor took its name already existed beforehand.

Southchurch appears as an estate or manor in the Domesday Book of 1086, being listed as Sudcerca in the Rochford Hundred of Essex. It was still then owned by the monks of Canterbury.

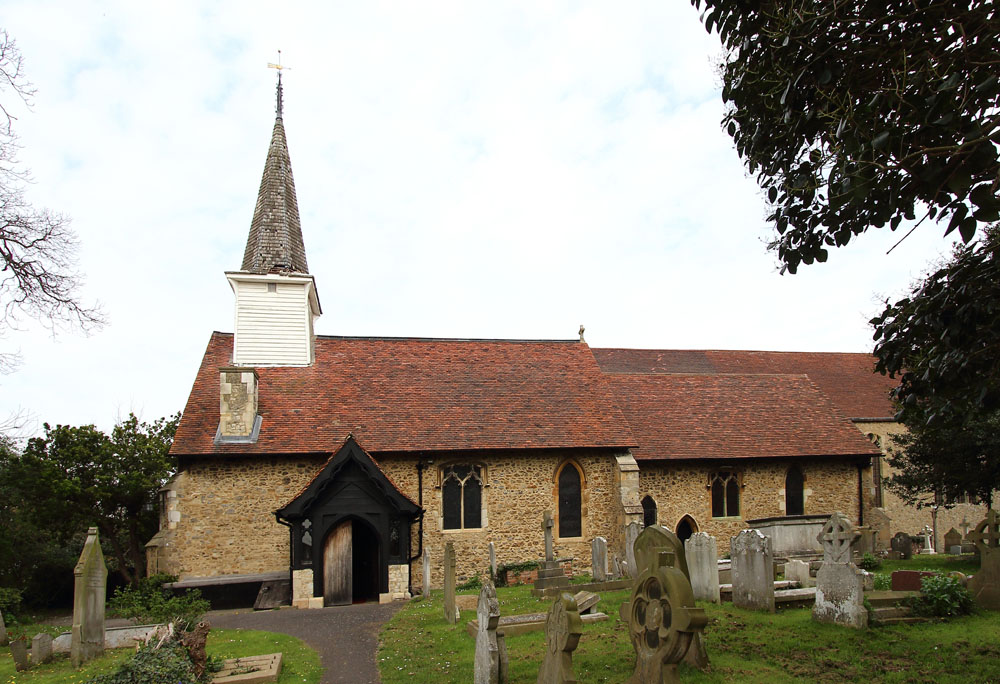
Holy Trinity Church

The name implies the presence of a church from an early date, and Southchurch formed an ancient parish. Its parish church, dedicated to the Holy Trinity, dates from the 13th century, although there is evidence that there was an earlier church on the site in the 12th century. As well as the village itself, the parish also covered surrounding areas, including Thorpe Bay by the coast to the south of the village.

When elected parish and district councils were established in 1894, Southchurch was included in the Rochford Rural District. Three years later, in 1897, the parish of Southchurch was absorbed into the borough of Southend-on-Sea. The parish was thereafter an urban parish and so ceased to be eligible to have its own parish council, with Southend-on-Sea Corporation being the lowest elected tier of local government. On 9 November 1913 all the urban parishes within the borough were abolished to form a single parish covering the same area as the borough. At the 1911 census (the last before the abolition of the civil parish), Southchurch had a population of 3,954.

== Location ==
Southchurch is bounded by Southchurch Avenue to the west (beyond which is central Southend-on-Sea), Thorpe Hall Avenue to the east (beyond which is Thorpe Bay), Eastern Avenue to the north (beyond which is Bournes Green) and Eastern Esplanade to the south (which runs along the north bank of the River Thames). Principal roads include Southchurch Road, Southchurch Boulevard, Woodgrange Drive, Ambleside Drive, Wyatts Drive and Lifstan Way.

== Housing ==
The current local housing stock mainly dates from the first half of the twentieth century, when Southchurch expanded from a village into the residential district of Southend. To the south of the station is Southchurch Hall, a thirteenth-century moated manor house. This is now open to the public as a museum, which stands in a small park: Southchurch Hall Gardens.

== Schools ==
Southchurch High School, Southend High School for Girls (grammar), Greenways primary school, Hamstel Road primary school and Porters Grange primary school are situated within the boundaries of Southchurch.

== Churches ==
Holy Trinity Church is the original parish church of Southchurch. The oldest parts of this church date back to the Saxon era, with later additions in the early 20th century. Christ Church (Church of England) is in Colbert Avenue, just to the east of Southchurch Park East. This parish was carved out of Holy Trinity in 1922. It began as a mission church in Elizabeth Road, which runs from the seafront to Southchurch Park.

== Rail ==
Southchurch is served by Southend East railway station. In 2004, following a campaign by local residents, traders, and some local councillors, the station signs were amended to read "Southend East for Southchurch Village".

== Sports ==
Southchurch is home to Southend Sunday Division team Bellevue Wanderers Football Club, Essex Senior Football League team Southend Manor and Southend Sceptre League team Southchurch AFC.

Southchurch Park is the home venue of Southend-on-Sea and EMT Cricket Club.

== Demography ==
At the 2001 UK census, the Southchurch electoral ward had a population of 9,467. The ethnicity was 96.3% white, 2.6% Asian, 0.7% mixed race, 0.3% black and 0.1% other.

The place of birth of residents was 94.9% United Kingdom, 0.6% Republic of Ireland, 0.9% other Western European countries, and 3.6% elsewhere.

Religion was recorded as 68.9% Christian, 2.1% Jewish, 0.9% Hindu, 0.2% Buddhist, 0.2% Sikh, and 1% Muslim, with 17.3% having no religion, 0.3% having an alternative religion, and 9.2% who did not state their religion.

The economic activity of residents aged 16–74 was 32.6% in full-time employment, 20.4% retired, 12.6% in part-time employment, 9.5% looking after home or family, 8.9% self-employed, 4.8% permanently sick or disabled, 3.4% students without jobs, 2.8% unemployed, 2% students with jobs, and 3% economically inactive for other reasons.

The industry of employment of residents was 15.6% retail, 13.9% finance, 13.9% real estate, 10% health and social work, 9.5% manufacturing, 7.9% construction, 6.7% education, 6.4% transport and communications, 6.2% public administration, 3% hotels and restaurants, 0.8% agriculture, and 6.1% other. Compared with national figures, the ward had a relatively high proportion of workers in finance and construction.

Of the ward's residents aged 16–74, 12.3% had a higher education qualification or the equivalent, compared with 19.9% nationwide.

According to Office for National Statistics estimates, during the period of April 2004 to March 2005 the average gross weekly income of households was £560, compared with an average of £650 in South East England.

== Gallery ==
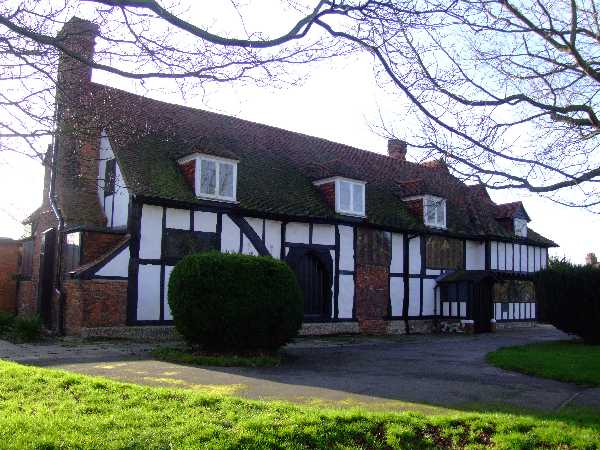
Southchurch Hall
