= The Naze =

Headland on the east coast of England

Coordinates: 51.868966°N 1.279564°E

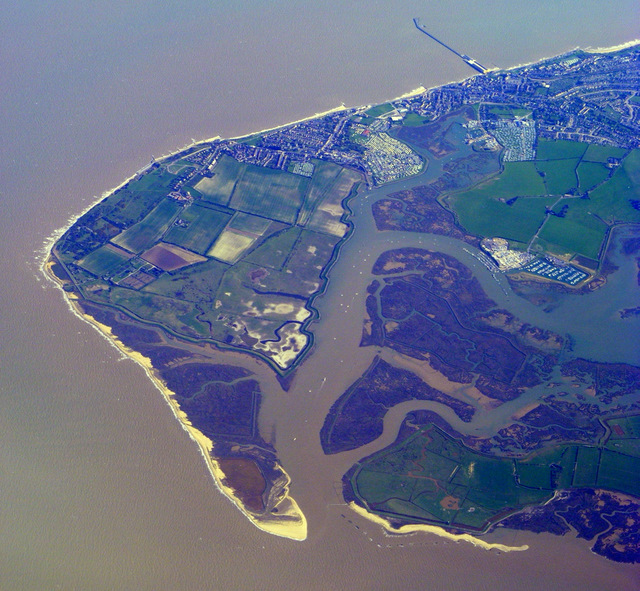
Aerial view of the Naze from the north, with Walton-on-the-Naze in the top right

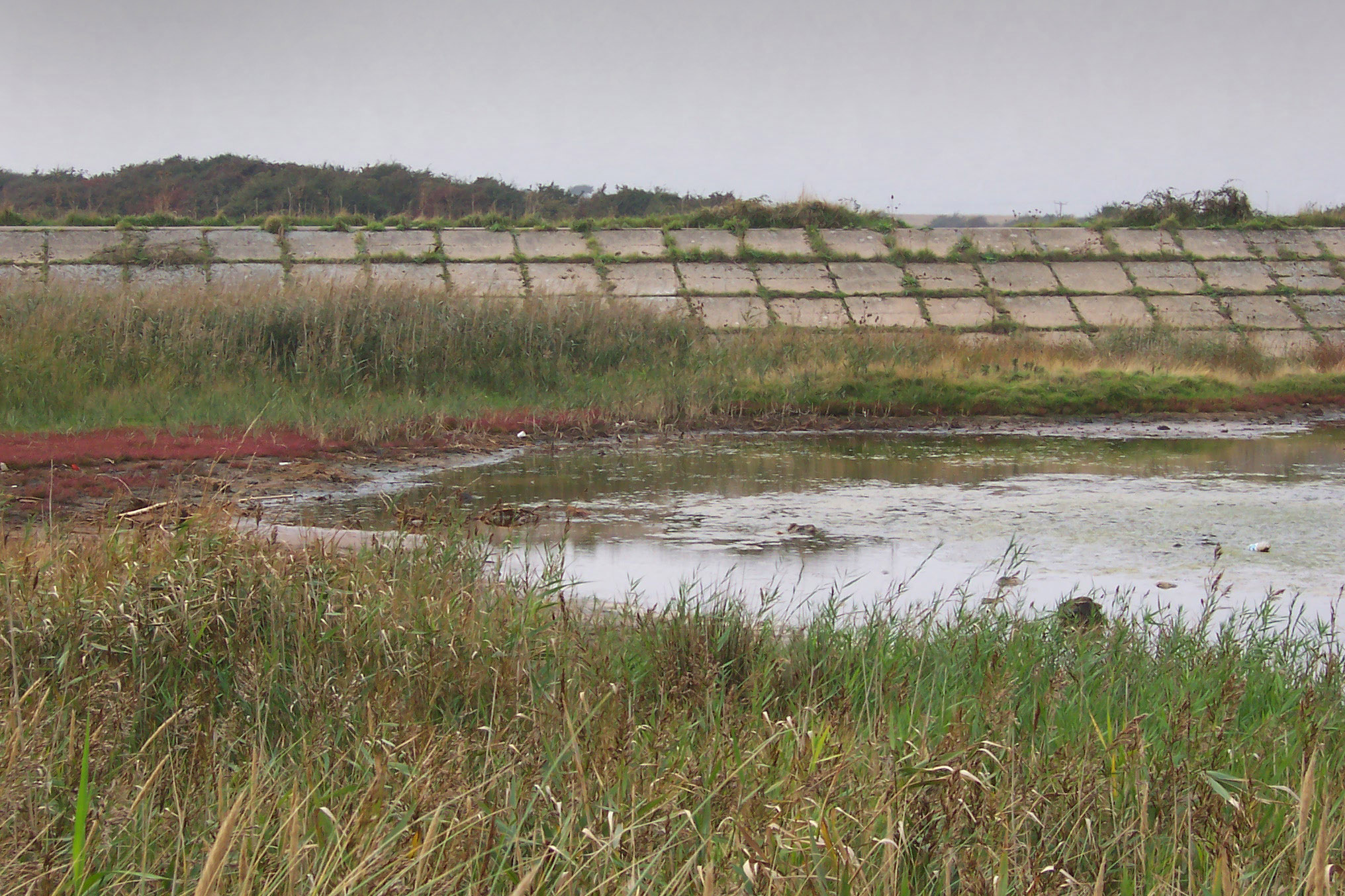
Landscape of the Naze

The Naze is a headland on the east coast of England. It is on the coast of Essex just north of Blackwater and projects into the North Sea. This area is south of the double estuary of the River Stour and River Orwell at Harwich and just north of the town of Walton-on-the-Naze. It is also the location of the Naze Tower, an 18th-century monument.

The Naze is a peninsula north of the town. It is important for migrating birds and it has a small nature reserve. The marshes of Hamford Water behind the town are also of ornithological interest, with wintering ducks and brent geese. Many bird watchers visit at migration times.

== History ==
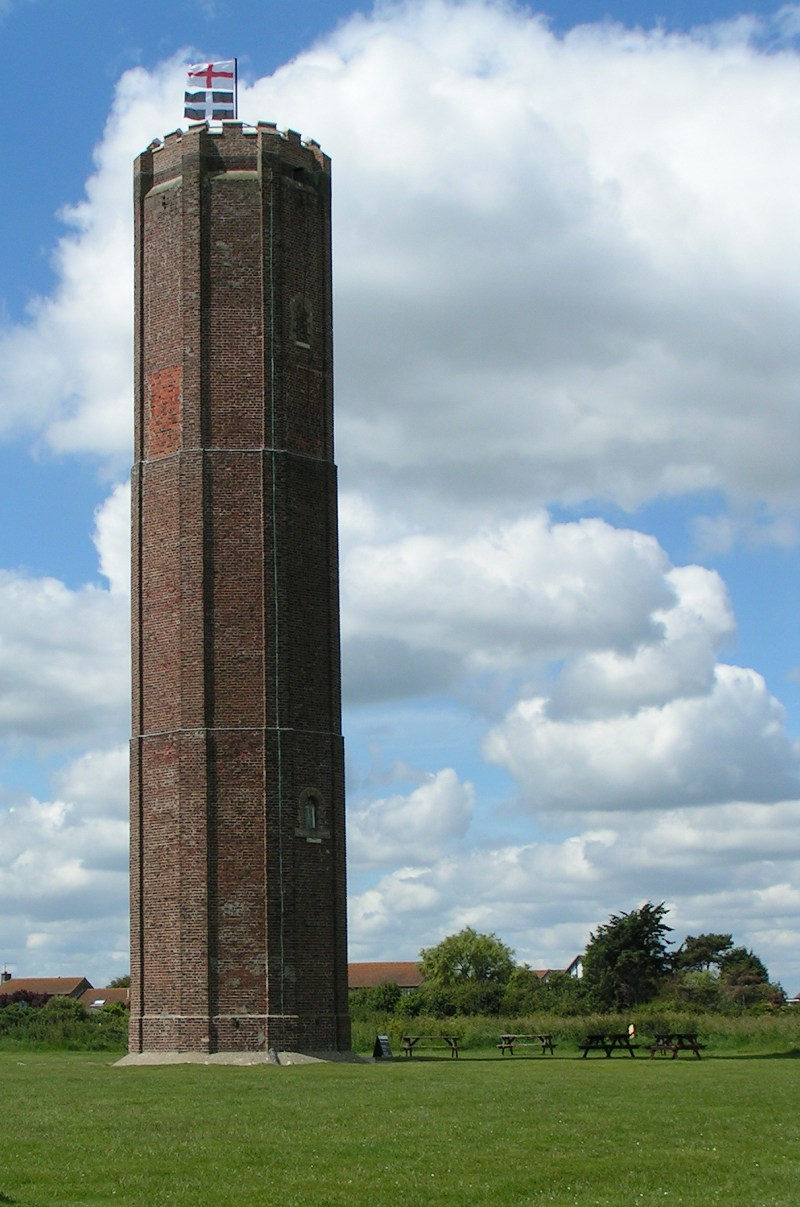
Naze Tower

The Naze takes its name from Viking raiders or settlers. The place-name "Naze" derives from Old English næss "ness, promontory, headland". In 1722 Daniel Defoe mentions the nearby town of Walton calling it "Walton, under the Nase".

The tall brick Naze Tower on the highest point was a lighthouse and was built up to its present height in 1796. In the Napoleonic and 1st World Wars it was a naval signal station. In the 2nd World War a Chain Home Low radar station was built on the Naze to track German warships and low-flying aircraft, and extended in 1942 to include the old tower.

(Refs; WO series and AVIA 7 and AIR 26 series files at the National Archives, Kew).

== Threats ==
The Naze is eroding rapidly and threatening the tower and the wildlife. The Naze Protection Society was formed to campaign for erosion controls. The Naze has become popular for school fieldwork into erosion and methods to protect the coast. Protection includes a sea wall, a riprap, groynes and a permeable groyne as well as drainage. The cliff at the Naze is mostly unprotected and eroding at a rate of approximately 2m per year. For many years there has been a campaign to try to protect the Naze tower from toppling into the sea. In 2010 a rock armour revetments was built in front of the tower and this now prevents the cliff in front of the tower from being eroded.However the cliff to the north of the tower continues to erode and the integrity of the rock revetment relies on periodic remedial work to reconnect the revetments to the eroding cliff face. If this is not done the revetments will be outflanked and erosion will break through and rapidly erode the cliff in front of the tower.
