= Essex Police Museum =

Police museum in Chelmsford, United Kingdom

Coordinates: 51.7378°N 0.4900°E

Essex Police Museum is a museum in Chelmsford in Essex, England. Established in 1992, the museum has more than 25,000 items in its collection, including objects, documents, paintings, and photographs which bring to life the history of policing in the county of Essex since 1840.

Using a grant from the Heritage Lottery Fund, the museum developed an education programme for children and adults, and refurbished its displays. Visitors can step into a police cell from the Victorian era, or try on a modern police uniform.

Since 2005, the Essex Police Museum has been open to the public on a regular basis. The museum is open on Saturdays year-round and also on Wednesdays during school holidays. Entry is free.
