= St Osyth Mahala Wood =

British philanthropist

St. Osyth Mahala Wood (née Eustace-Smith; 6 January 1886 – 1 November 1970) was an English philanthropist.

== Biography ==
St. Osyth Eustace-Smith was the daughter of Thomas Eustace Smith JP and Katherine St Osyth Howard of Wormingford, Essex. Her father Thomas was a justice of the peace and Barrister with offices located in North Hill, Colchester. Her mother was Katherine Howard before marriage. Katherine's mother was called Mahala and came from St. Osyth in Essex,

When she was approximately 26 years old she became secretary of the Colchester branch of "Suffragists". "The Colchester NUWSS society was formed in January 1912 with Miss Eustace Smith (Wormingford Grove, near Colchester) as its secretary" appears on p91 of Elizabeth Crawford's book The Women's Suffrage Movement in Britain and Ireland: It is also mentioned in the Essex County Standard on Feb 10th 1912.

The NUWSS was the National Union of Women's Suffrage Societies. These were the women who campaigned for the vote through non-militant means, so they did not resort to the arson attacks and other violent protests as their fellow "suffragettes" did

On 7 June 1918 "The London Gazette" reported Miss St. Osyth Mahala Eustace-Smith receiving an OBE for her work as "Hon Secretary, Essex Local War Pensions Committee". She would have been 32 years of age at this time.

On 24 July 1924, aged 38, St. Osyth married Dr Thomas Wood in Wormingford Church, Essex. Thomas Wood, an author and prolific composer, became known worldwide for writing the music to Waltzing Matilda in 1941. In 1947 he became chairman of the Royal Philharmonic Society, in 1949 Chairman of the Arts Council's Music Panel, and later a member of the BBC's Music Advisory Committee.

After their marriage, the new Mrs St. Osyth Wood moved into Parsonage Hall, Bures and became a great benefactor to her local community. She was very adept at embroidery. On her death her work was donated to Hampton Court Palace, currently the home of the Embroiderers' Guild and the Royal School of Needlework. It can be seen on display by arrangement with the curator. St. Osyth was also noted for her ability to create dolls' furniture out of mahogany, an extremely hard wood to work with and not the preferred choice of wood normally used for such fine work. The Essex Handicraft Association drew up plans for a magnificent dolls' house to architectural standards in 1955 to portray a typical Essex mansion. Plans were drawn up by a qualified architect from Feering in Essex. The house was called "The Essex Model House"and was based on Boreham Manor, near Chelmsford. It is extremely large [5 ft wide (1.5 m) and 6 ft high (1.8 m)], as it required the services of a professional plasterer to cover the interior walls. The interior base in places is made of genuine miniature parquet flooring. The finished construction stood for some time in Parsonage Hall, Bures. It is now on permanent display at the Braintree Museum, Essex.

In recognition of her husband's work at Exeter College, Oxford, she was the main benefactor to the "Thomas Wood Building", which is located in the centre of the city. This stands on the previous site of an old bookshop which was pulled down by the college and replaced by this new building. It was opened by the then Chancellor of the university, Harold Macmillan. It now incorporates "Blackwell's Art & Poster Shop" on the ground floor, with student accommodation in the upper floors.

St. Osyth also donated a statue called Alma Matar, which stands in the grounds of Exeter College.

St. Osyth was a member of staff at Roedean School for Girls at Brighton sometime during the 1950s–1970s. She died at Wasperton, Warwickshire aged 84 years.

St. Osyth was known for her intricate embroidery skills. On one occasion she constructed a small wooden box, embroidered on the lid were Mary, Queen of Scots, Elizabeth I and Anne Boleyn, all copies of portraits in the National Portrait Gallery in London. The likeness to the original portrait of Mary Queen of Scots is very striking, right down to the stitched blackwork detail on the chemise. Perhaps it was this 'royal' connection that caught the eye of one of Queen Mary's ladies-in-waiting who saw Mrs Wood's work in an arts and crafts exhibition in Blakeney, Norfolk, in the 1950s.

In 1952 St. Osyth was subsequently invited to take lunch with Queen Mary at Sandringham and she was requested to bring along her embroidery.

She took along this box, but before departing she sold it to her housekeeper/companion for 1d to give to the Queen. She did not want the Queen to think she was giving her work away for nothing. Queen Mary's Secretary later wrote to St. Osyth, saying that Queen Mary would very much like her to embroider Elizabeth I which she would like to hang on the wall.

St. Osyth within a very short space of time supplied this embroidery and consequently received a letter of thanks from the Queen's Secretary.
