= Listed buildings in Harlow =

Historic structures in Essex, England

Harlow is a town, non-civil parish and a local government district in Essex, England. It contains 179 listed buildings that are recorded in the National Heritage List for England. Of these five are grade I, nine are grade II* and 165 are grade II.

This list is based on the information retrieved online from Historic England.

== Key ==
Grade	Criteria
I	Buildings that are of exceptional interest
II*	Particularly important buildings of more than special interest
II	Buildings that are of special interest

== Listing ==
Name	Grade	Location	Type	Completed (Note: The date given is the date used by Historic England as significant for the initial building or that of an important part in the structure's description.)	Date designated	Grid ref. (Note: The grid reference is based on the British national grid reference system, sometimes known as OSGB36, used by the Ordnance Survey.) Geo-coordinates	Notes	Entry number (Note: The "List Entry Number" is a unique number assigned to each listed building and scheduled monument by Historic England.)	Image	Wikidata
Donkey Sculpture	II	Cm20	sculpture		19 January 2016	TL4556710430; 51°46′25″N 0°06′30″E		1431399	Donkey Sculpture More images	Q26677717
Hubbard's Hall	II				23 December 1983	TL4837910440; 51°46′23″N 0°08′57″E		1123949	Upload Photo	Q26417036
Portrait Figure of Elisabeth Frink	II	Cm20			19 January 2016	TL4448509975; 51°46′11″N 0°05′33″E		1431426	Upload Photo	Q26677719
Range of Two Service Buildings West of Hubbard's Hall	II				23 December 1983	TL4836210421; 51°46′22″N 0°08′56″E		1166008	Upload Photo	Q26459478
Wild Boar Sculpture	II	Cm20			19 January 2016	TL4460309705; 51°46′02″N 0°05′39″E		1431373	Upload Photo	Q26677713
Gateway, Adjacent to Canons Barn	II	Adjacent To Canons Barn, Elizabeth Way			5 July 1950	TL4324010278; 51°46′22″N 0°04′29″E		1169220	Upload Photo	Q26462425
Building to Rear, and North East of Hudc Depot	II	And North East Of Hudc Depot, Latton Common Road			19 June 1981	TL4641608179; 51°45′11″N 0°07′11″E		1337018	Upload Photo	Q26621473
Help Sculpture	II	Black Lion Court, Old Harlow, CM17 0AJ			19 January 2016	TL4710711627; 51°47′02″N 0°07′52″E		1431428	Upload Photo	Q26677720
Harlow Mill Restaurant	II	Cambridge Road			19 June 1981	TL4705712822; 51°47′41″N 0°07′52″E		1111737	Upload Photo	Q26405532
House 20 Metres North West of St Stephen's Cottages	II	Chalk Lane			26 April 1984	TL4947611503; 51°46′56″N 0°09′56″E		1337570	Upload Photo	Q26621976
Church of St Paul Including Attached Bell Tower, Church Hall, Flat Raised Pavement and Steps	II	Church Hall, Flat Raised Pavement And Steps, College Square	church building		16 November 2007	TL4451409805; 51°46′06″N 0°05′34″E		1392352	Church of St Paul Including Attached Bell Tower, Church Hall, Flat Raised Pavement and Steps More images	Q26671575
Church of St Mary Magdalene	II	Church Road	church building		19 June 1981	TL4727508450; 51°45′19″N 0°07′56″E		1111738	Church of St Mary Magdalene More images	Q26405533
Meadhams	II	1, Churchgate Street			5 July 1950	TL4826911613; 51°47′01″N 0°08′53″E		1111703	Upload Photo	Q26405491
2, 4 and 6, Churchgate Street	II	2, 4 and 6, Churchgate Street			5 July 1950	TL4826011594; 51°47′00″N 0°08′53″E		1337026	Upload Photo	Q26621481
Numbers 2, 3 and 4 (godsafe)	II	2, 3 and 4 (godsafe), Churchgate Street			19 June 1981	TL4829311523; 51°46′58″N 0°08′54″E		1337027	Upload Photo	Q26621482
13, Churchgate Street	II	13, Churchgate Street			19 June 1981	TL4832111523; 51°46′58″N 0°08′56″E		1111704	Upload Photo	Q26405492
15, Churchgate Street	II	15, Churchgate Street			5 July 1950	TL4832511508; 51°46′57″N 0°08′56″E		1111705	Upload Photo	Q26405493
Post Office	II	17 and 19, Churchgate Street			5 July 1950	TL4832911496; 51°46′57″N 0°08′56″E		1111706	Upload Photo	Q26405494
21, 23 and 25, Churchgate Street	II	21, 23 and 25, Churchgate Street			19 June 1981	TL4833211478; 51°46′56″N 0°08′56″E		1111707	Upload Photo	Q26405495
Number 28, Number 30 (disty's) and Number 32	II	28, Churchgate Street			19 June 1981	TL4833011426; 51°46′55″N 0°08′56″E		1111701	Upload Photo	Q26405489
42 and 44, Churchgate Street	II	42 and 44, Churchgate Street			19 June 1981	TL4835211380; 51°46′53″N 0°08′57″E		1337047	Upload Photo	Q26621498
Churchgate Hotel	II	Churchgate Street			5 July 1950	TL4841511332; 51°46′52″N 0°09′00″E		1111702	Upload Photo	Q26405490
K6 Telephone Kiosk	II	Churchgate Street			27 July 1988	TL4832211493; 51°46′57″N 0°08′56″E		1111639	Upload Photo	Q26405421
Lychgate to Churchyard of St Mary and St Hugh	II	Churchgate Street			19 June 1981	TL4831411473; 51°46′56″N 0°08′55″E		1111699	Upload Photo	Q26405488
Parish Church of St Mary and St Hugh	II	Churchgate Street	church building		5 July 1950	TL4827211468; 51°46′56″N 0°08′53″E		1111740	Parish Church of St Mary and St Hugh More images	Q7594551
Stafford Almshouses	II	Churchgate Street			5 July 1950	TL4831711464; 51°46′56″N 0°08′55″E		1337046	Upload Photo	Q26621497
The Queen's Head Public House	II*	Churchgate Street	pub		5 July 1950	TL4832211444; 51°46′55″N 0°08′56″E		1111700	The Queen's Head Public House More images	Q17531811
The School	II	Churchgate Street			19 June 1981	TL4826311544; 51°46′59″N 0°08′53″E		1111739	Upload Photo	Q26405535
Water Gardens	II	Civic Square			4 October 2001	TL4462409705; 51°46′02″N 0°05′40″E		1389446	Upload Photo	Q26668880
Orchard Cottage	II	Commonside Road			19 August 1975	TL4572407959; 51°45′05″N 0°06′35″E		1111708	Upload Photo	Q26405496
Pink Cottage Restaurant	II	Commonside Road			19 June 1981	TL4508407562; 51°44′53″N 0°06′01″E		1337048	Upload Photo	Q26621499
Stewards Farmhouse	II	Commonside Road			5 July 1950	TL4528007741; 51°44′58″N 0°06′11″E		1111709	Upload Photo	Q26405497
Gate Lodge	II	115, East Park			19 June 1981	TL4718011379; 51°46′54″N 0°07′56″E		1169204	Upload Photo	Q26462407
Canons Barn	II	Elizabeth Way			5 July 1950	TL4319810320; 51°46′24″N 0°04′27″E		1111710	Upload Photo	Q26405498
Church of St Mary the Virgin	I	First Avenue, Latton	church building		5 July 1950	TL4640410881; 51°46′39″N 0°07′15″E		1337049	Church of St Mary the Virgin More images	Q15210293
Harlow Toc H	II	First Avenue			19 June 1981	TL4666910977; 51°46′42″N 0°07′29″E		1111711	Upload Photo	Q26405499
17 and 19, Fore Street	II	17 and 19, Fore Street, CM17 0AB			19 June 1981	TL4711211525; 51°46′59″N 0°07′53″E		1337050	Upload Photo	Q26621500
21, Fore Street	II	21, Fore Street			19 June 1981	TL4710211527; 51°46′59″N 0°07′52″E		1111712	Upload Photo	Q26405500
23 and 25, Fore Street	II	23 and 25, Fore Street			19 June 1981	TL4709411525; 51°46′59″N 0°07′52″E		1306638	Upload Photo	Q26593401
Harlow Baptist Church	II	Fore Street			19 June 1981	TL4708711438; 51°46′56″N 0°07′51″E		1111713	Upload Photo	Q26405501
Marquis of Granby Public House	II	Fore Street			19 June 1981	TL4717011556; 51°47′00″N 0°07′56″E		1169248	Upload Photo	Q26462449
The Gables	II*	Fore Street	architectural structure		5 July 1950	TL4718211544; 51°47′00″N 0°07′56″E		1169233	The Gables More images	Q17531825
Fountains Farmhouse	II	5, Fountain Farm, CM18 6RB			19 June 1981	TL4566808551; 51°45′24″N 0°06′33″E		1111677	Upload Photo	Q26405469
Contrapuntal Forms Sculpture	II	Glebelands	sculpture		15 April 1998	TL4583411049; 51°46′45″N 0°06′45″E		1031593	Contrapuntal Forms Sculpture More images	Q26282978
Church of St Mary the Virgin	I	Great Parndon	church building		5 July 1950	TL4323908906; 51°45′38″N 0°04′27″E		1337051	Church of St Mary the Virgin More images	Q17536832
Parndon Hall	II	Hamstel Road			19 June 1981	TL4387610234; 51°46′20″N 0°05′02″E		1111714	Upload Photo	Q26405502
Hare Street Farmhouse	II	Harberts Road			5 July 1950	TL4404009873; 51°46′08″N 0°05′10″E		1169254	Upload Photo	Q26462456
Todd Brook House	II	Harberts Road			5 July 1950	TL4399609102; 51°45′44″N 0°05′06″E		1337052	Upload Photo	Q26621501
96 and 97, Hare Street	II	96 and 97, Hare Street			19 June 1981	TL4396809842; 51°46′07″N 0°05′06″E		1306602	Upload Photo	Q26593368
The Hare Public House	II	Hare Street	pub		19 June 1981	TL4395609822; 51°46′07″N 0°05′05″E		1111718	The Hare Public House More images	Q26405507
Barn to South of Todd Brook House	II	Hareberts Road			19 June 1981	TL4391409117; 51°45′44″N 0°05′02″E		1111715	Upload Photo	Q26405503
Bensons	II	Harlow Common			16 January 1991	TL4813208919; 51°45′34″N 0°08′42″E		1111640	Upload Photo	Q26405422
Hoggs Farm	II	Harlow Common			26 April 1984	TL4826208810; 51°45′30″N 0°08′48″E		1146684	Upload Photo	Q26439794
2, High Street	II	2, High Street			5 July 1950	TL4722011549; 51°47′00″N 0°07′58″E		1169289	Upload Photo	Q26462487
Numbers 7 and 9 (fronting on London Road)	II	7 and 9, High Street			5 July 1950	TL4723311578; 51°47′01″N 0°07′59″E		1337053	Upload Photo	Q26621502
30 and 32, High Street	II	30 and 32, High Street, Old Harlow, CM17 0DW			5 July 1950	TL4729211556; 51°47′00″N 0°08′02″E		1306585	Upload Photo	Q26593351
34, High Street	II	34, High Street			5 July 1950	TL4729811559; 51°47′00″N 0°08′02″E		1111716	Upload Photo	Q26405504
Chestnut Cottage	II	71, High Street			19 June 1981	TL4745811636; 51°47′02″N 0°08′11″E		1337054	Upload Photo	Q26621503
Marigolds	II	High Street			19 June 1981	TL4744611602; 51°47′01″N 0°08′10″E		1169315	Upload Photo	Q26462510
The Wayre	II	High Street			19 June 1981	TL4740411575; 51°47′00″N 0°08′08″E		1111717	Upload Photo	Q26405506
Thatched Cottages	II	4, Hobbs Cross Road			26 April 1984	TL4887210828; 51°46′35″N 0°09′23″E		1308967	Upload Photo	Q26595514
Franklins Farmhouse	II	Hobbs Cross Road			26 April 1984	TL4907910617; 51°46′28″N 0°09′34″E		1123920	Upload Photo	Q26417012
Hatches	II	Hobbs Cross Road			26 April 1984	TL4886610834; 51°46′35″N 0°09′23″E		1337574	Upload Photo	Q26621979
Pump Approximately 15 Metres South of Spiers	II	Hobbs Cross Road			26 April 1984	TL4888610772; 51°46′33″N 0°09′24″E		1308963	Upload Photo	Q26595510
Spiers Farm	II	Hobbs Cross Road			26 April 1984	TL4887810782; 51°46′33″N 0°09′24″E		1123921	Upload Photo	Q26417013
Roman Catholic Church of Our Lady of Fatima	II*	Howard Way, CM20 2NS	church building		20 December 2000	TL4573710803; 51°46′37″N 0°06′40″E		1246733	Roman Catholic Church of Our Lady of Fatima More images	Q26539112
24, Kingsdon Lane	II	24, Kingsdon Lane			19 June 1981	TL4717609202; 51°45′44″N 0°07′52″E		1169354	Upload Photo	Q26462548
Glan Avon	II	Kingsdon Lane			19 June 1981	TL4715009169; 51°45′43″N 0°07′51″E		1111719	Upload Photo	Q26405509
Kingsdon Hall	II	Kingsdon Lane			5 July 1950	TL4715409210; 51°45′44″N 0°07′51″E		1337055	Upload Photo	Q26621504
High House	II	12, Kingsmoor Road			19 June 1981	TL4369708339; 51°45′19″N 0°04′50″E		1111720	Upload Photo	Q26405510
Hudc Depot	II	Latton Common Road			19 June 1981	TL4641808159; 51°45′11″N 0°07′11″E		1169379	Upload Photo	Q26462573
Woodbine Cottage	II	Linford End, CM19 4LN			19 June 1981	TL4402708807; 51°45′34″N 0°05′08″E		1306583	Upload Photo	Q26593349
Baptist Chapel	II	London Road			5 July 1950	TL4727908680; 51°45′27″N 0°07′57″E		1111657	Upload Photo	Q26405443
Barn Approximately 30 Metres South East of Barnsley Cottage	II	London Road			26 April 1984	TL4758809880; 51°46′05″N 0°08′15″E		1111390	Upload Photo	Q26405113
Fawbert and Barnards School	II	London Road			19 June 1981	TL4722811327; 51°46′52″N 0°07′58″E		1337074	Upload Photo	Q99937456
Garden Wall to Fawbert and Barnards School	II	London Road			19 June 1981	TL4720411324; 51°46′52″N 0°07′57″E		1111678	Upload Photo	Q26405470
Outbuilding South East of White House	II	London Road			19 June 1981	TL4715209024; 51°45′38″N 0°07′51″E		1111661	Upload Photo	Q26405448
Springs	II	London Road			19 June 1981	TL4735608478; 51°45′20″N 0°08′01″E		1111658	Upload Photo	Q26405444
The Red Lion Public House	II	London Road	pub		19 June 1981	TL4730208772; 51°45′30″N 0°07′58″E		1111659	The Red Lion Public House More images	Q26405445
The Round House	II	London Road			12 January 1983	TL4793910406; 51°46′22″N 0°08′34″E		1166304	Upload Photo	Q26459784
Netteswell Rectory	II	Manston Road			19 June 1981	TL4549009687; 51°46′01″N 0°06′25″E		1337075	Upload Photo	Q26621520
Orchard Croft	II	3-12, Mardyke Road, The Stow			22 December 1998	TL4609310604; 51°46′30″N 0°06′58″E		1271494	Upload Photo	Q26561438
Orchard Croft	II	161-165, Mardyke Road, The Stow			22 December 1998	TL4617510596; 51°46′30″N 0°07′02″E		1271495	Upload Photo	Q26682966
The Lawn Attached Walls and Terrace	II	1-36, Mark Hall North			22 December 1998	TL4670711230; 51°46′50″N 0°07′31″E		1271496	Upload Photo	Q26561440
The Lawn and Attached Wall to South	II	37-52, Mark Hall North			22 December 1998	TL4673611260; 51°46′51″N 0°07′33″E		1246029	Upload Photo	Q26538479
Meat Porters Sculpture	II	Market Square	statue		15 April 1998	TL4456010108; 51°46′16″N 0°05′37″E		1031595	Meat Porters Sculpture More images	Q26282981
38, Market Street	II	38, Market Street			19 June 1981	TL4707411564; 51°47′00″N 0°07′51″E		1337037	Upload Photo	Q26621491
42-48, Market Street	II	42-48, Market Street			5 July 1950	TL4705811560; 51°47′00″N 0°07′50″E		1111681	Upload Photo	Q26405473
54, 56 and 58, Market Street	II	54, 56 and 58, Market Street			19 June 1981	TL4701611541; 51°47′00″N 0°07′48″E		1111682	Upload Photo	Q26405474
Nunns	II	60, Market Street			19 June 1981	TL4701411538; 51°47′00″N 0°07′47″E		1111683	Upload Photo	Q26405475
The Chequers Public House	II	Market Street	pub		19 June 1981	TL4718711590; 51°47′01″N 0°07′57″E		1111679	The Chequers Public House More images	Q26405471
The Crown Public House	II	Market Street	pub		5 July 1950	TL4707011564; 51°47′00″N 0°07′50″E		1111680	The Crown Public House More images	Q26405472
Sheep Shearer Sculpture Outside Tenants Common Room	II	Momples Road			15 April 1998	TL4662710283; 51°46′19″N 0°07′25″E		1031594	Upload Photo	Q26282980
High House	II	Moor Hall Road (corner Of Sheering Road)			19 June 1981	TL4863411784; 51°47′06″N 0°09′12″E		1111685	Upload Photo	Q26405477
Brockles	II	Morningtons			5 July 1950	TL4411407525; 51°44′52″N 0°05′10″E		1111686	Upload Photo	Q26405478
3, 5, 7 and 9, Mulberry Green	II	3, 5, 7 and 9, Mulberry Green			5 July 1950	TL4773711589; 51°47′00″N 0°08′25″E		1111687	Upload Photo	Q26405479
Wall, Extending for 11 Bays, East of Number 30	II	Extending For 11 Bays, East Of Number 30, Mulberry Green			19 June 1981	TL4787811575; 51°47′00″N 0°08′33″E		1169507	Upload Photo	Q26462700
Granary Cottage	II	30, Mulberry Green			19 June 1981	TL4785611554; 51°46′59″N 0°08′31″E		1111690	Upload Photo	Q26405481
The Dormer Cottage	II	31, Mulberry Green			19 June 1981	TL4776911591; 51°47′01″N 0°08′27″E		1169451	Upload Photo	Q26462644
Cotswold	II	Mulberry Green			5 July 1950	TL4776011589; 51°47′00″N 0°08′26″E		1111688	Upload Photo	Q26405480
Gateway to Hill House	II	Mulberry Green			19 June 1981	TL4781511565; 51°47′00″N 0°08′29″E		1306487	Upload Photo	Q26593263
Hill House	II*	Mulberry Green			5 July 1950	TL4782411555; 51°46′59″N 0°08′30″E		1337039	Upload Photo	Q17531867
Mulberry Green House and Stables	II*	Mulberry Green	architectural structure		5 July 1950	TL4780111534; 51°46′59″N 0°08′29″E		1111689	Mulberry Green House and Stables More images	Q17531796
The Green Man Public House and Hotel	II	Mulberry Green	pub		5 July 1950	TL4771411543; 51°46′59″N 0°08′24″E		1337038	The Green Man Public House and Hotel More images	Q26621492
The Old Forge	II	Mulberry Green			5 July 1950	TL4774411545; 51°46′59″N 0°08′26″E		1169455	Upload Photo	Q26462647
Stable Block at Mark Hall	II	Muskham Road			19 June 1981	TL4591810554; 51°46′29″N 0°06′49″E		1337040	Upload Photo	Q26621493
Triple Range of Outbuildings Formerly House Attached to Stable Block at Mark Hall	II	Muskham Road			19 June 1981	TL4661411024; 51°46′43″N 0°07′26″E		1111691	Upload Photo	Q26405482
Wall from Stable Gateway Along Muskham Road	II	Muskham Road			19 June 1981	TL4658210970; 51°46′42″N 0°07′24″E		1306504	Upload Photo	Q26593277
Barn East of Netteswellbury House	II*	Netteswellbury			5 July 1950	TL4556509356; 51°45′50″N 0°06′29″E		1337041	Upload Photo	Q17531880
Barn South of Netteswellbury House	II	Netteswellbury			5 July 1950	TL4557809288; 51°45′48″N 0°06′29″E		1111693	Upload Photo	Q26405483
Barn South of Netteswellbury House	II	Netteswellbury			5 July 1950	TL4557009303; 51°45′49″N 0°06′29″E		1306476	Upload Photo	Q26684260
Church of St Andrew	I	Netteswellbury	church building		5 July 1950	TL4561109349; 51°45′50″N 0°06′31″E		1111692	Church of St Andrew More images	Q17536815
Netteswellbury House	II	Netteswellbury			19 June 1981	TL4552709328; 51°45′49″N 0°06′27″E		1169570	Upload Photo	Q26462759
2, Old Road	II	2, Old Road, Mulberry Green			19 June 1981	TL4772411611; 51°47′01″N 0°08′25″E		1169599	Upload Photo	Q26462784
4, Old Road	II	4, Old Road			19 June 1981	TL4772011618; 51°47′01″N 0°08′24″E		1337042	Upload Photo	Q26621494
Chapel South West of Harlowbury in Grounds	I	Old Road	chapel		5 July 1950	TL4772912056; 51°47′16″N 0°08′26″E		1111694	Chapel South West of Harlowbury in Grounds More images	Q17536820
Harlowbury	I	Old Road			16 June 1977	TL4774512096; 51°47′17″N 0°08′26″E		1306455	Upload Photo	Q17536826
Former Coach House North East of Kingsmoor House	II	Paringdon Road			19 June 1981	TL4389007740; 51°45′00″N 0°04′59″E		1111696	Upload Photo	Q26405485
Kingsmoor Cottage	II	Paringdon Road			19 June 1981	TL4383007884; 51°45′04″N 0°04′56″E		1169600	Upload Photo	Q26462785
Kingsmoor House	II*	Paringdon Road			19 June 1981	TL4388607717; 51°44′59″N 0°04′59″E		1337043	Upload Photo	Q17531898
Kingsmoor Lodge	II	Paringdon Road			19 June 1981	TL4386807787; 51°45′01″N 0°04′58″E		1169604	Upload Photo	Q26462788
Thatched Cottage	II	Paringdon Road			3 October 1978	TL4380307948; 51°45′06″N 0°04′55″E		1111695	Upload Photo	Q26405484
1, Park Hill	II	1, Park Hill			2 December 1996	TL4705811515; 51°46′59″N 0°07′50″E		1259612	Upload Photo	Q26550709
Hemsford	II	9, Park Hill			19 June 1981	TL4699211492; 51°46′58″N 0°07′46″E		1306461	Upload Photo	Q26593239
West House	II	Park Hill			19 June 1981	TL4701611508; 51°46′59″N 0°07′48″E		1337044	Upload Photo	Q26621495
Hoppits	II	Park Lane			19 June 1981	TL4508510875; 51°46′40″N 0°06′06″E		1111697	Upload Photo	Q26405486
The Greyhound Public House	II	Park Lane	pub		19 June 1981	TL4509110923; 51°46′41″N 0°06′06″E		1111698	The Greyhound Public House More images	Q26405487
Church of St Mary	II	Parndon Mill Lane	church building		5 July 1950	TL4387411008; 51°46′45″N 0°05′03″E		1111721	Church of St Mary More images	Q26405511
Little Parndon Watermill	II	Parndon Mill Lane			19 June 1981	TL4369211099; 51°46′48″N 0°04′54″E		1337045	Upload Photo	Q26621496
Parndon Mill House	II	Parndon Mill Lane			19 June 1981	TL4368811074; 51°46′48″N 0°04′53″E		1169613	Upload Photo	Q26462796
Appletree Cottage	II	Parndon Wood Road			19 June 1981	TL4426607286; 51°44′45″N 0°05′18″E		1337063	Upload Photo	Q26621510
C17 Barn North East of Sumner's Farmhouse	II	Parsloe Road			12 October 1979	TL4349507264; 51°44′45″N 0°04′38″E		1337064	Upload Photo	Q26621511
C18 Barn North East of Sumner's Farmhouse	II	Parsloe Road			12 October 1979	TL4352007282; 51°44′45″N 0°04′39″E		1111656	Upload Photo	Q26405441
Sumner's Farmhouse	II	Parsloe Road			12 October 1979	TL4347507223; 51°44′43″N 0°04′36″E		1111655	Upload Photo	Q26405440
Katherine's	II	Peldon Road			5 July 1950	TL4327408863; 51°45′36″N 0°04′28″E		1337065	Upload Photo	Q26621512
White House	II	42, Potter Street			19 June 1981	TL4713909029; 51°45′38″N 0°07′50″E		1111660	Upload Photo	Q26405447
London Road (see Details for Further Address Information)	II	48, Potter Street			19 June 1981	TL4719208935; 51°45′35″N 0°07′53″E		1337066	Upload Photo	Q26621513
16th Century Outbuilding East of Coppins	II	16th Century Outbuilding East Of Coppins, Puffers Green, Latton			19 June 1981	TL4668109610; 51°45′57″N 0°07′27″E		1111664	Upload Photo	Q26405452
Clock Tower	II	Puffers Green, Latton			19 June 1981	TL4674809436; 51°45′52″N 0°07′30″E		1111662	Upload Photo	Q26405449
Coppins	II*	Puffers Green, Latton			19 June 1981	TL4667409606; 51°45′57″N 0°07′27″E		1169716	Upload Photo	Q17531842
Outbuilding East of 16th Century Outbuilding East of Coppins	II	Puffers Green, Latton			19 June 1981	TL4670009626; 51°45′58″N 0°07′28″E		1111665	Upload Photo	Q26405453
School House	II	Puffers Green, Latton			19 June 1981	TL4670309526; 51°45′55″N 0°07′28″E		1111663	Upload Photo	Q26405451
Kitchen Hall Farmhouse	II	Red Lion Lane			26 April 1984	TL4792909113; 51°45′40″N 0°08′31″E		1111352	Upload Photo	Q26405065
Barn West of 17th Century Barn at Skins Farmhouse	II	Roydon Road			19 June 1981	TL4207210179; 51°46′20″N 0°03′28″E		1337067	Upload Photo	Q26621514
Barn West of Skins Farmhouse	II	Roydon Road			19 June 1981	TL4207010170; 51°46′20″N 0°03′28″E		1169753	Upload Photo	Q26462927
Barn at Roydon Lea Farmhouse	II	Roydon Road			19 June 1981	TL4260710725; 51°46′37″N 0°03′56″E		1111666	Upload Photo	Q26405455
Granary South West of Skins Farmhouse	II	Roydon Road			19 June 1981	TL4207310137; 51°46′19″N 0°03′28″E		1111668	Upload Photo	Q26405458
Old House	II*	Roydon Road			5 July 1950	TL4205910181; 51°46′20″N 0°03′27″E		1169770	Upload Photo	Q17531855
Roydon Lea Farmhouse	II	Roydon Road			19 June 1981	TL4260810722; 51°46′37″N 0°03′56″E		1169737	Upload Photo	Q26462911
Skins Farmhouse	II	Roydon Road			5 July 1950	TL4210110161; 51°46′20″N 0°03′29″E		1111667	Upload Photo	Q26405456
6, School Lane	II	6, School Lane			19 June 1981	TL4525310654; 51°46′33″N 0°06′14″E		1111670	Upload Photo	Q26405461
Former School	II	School Lane, CM20 3QA			5 July 1950	TL4536810316; 51°46′22″N 0°06′20″E		1111671	Upload Photo	Q26405462
Hill House Farmhouse	II	School Lane			19 June 1981	TL4518210607; 51°46′31″N 0°06′11″E		1169789	Upload Photo	Q26462965
Marshgate Farmhouse	II	School Lane			17 July 1975	TL4504811131; 51°46′48″N 0°06′04″E		1111669	Upload Photo	Q26405460
Long Barn	II	8 and 10, Sheering Drive			19 June 1981	TL4799711533; 51°46′58″N 0°08′39″E		1337070	Upload Photo	Q26621516
Newhall	II	14, Sheering Drive			5 July 1950	TL4802811522; 51°46′58″N 0°08′40″E		1169810	Upload Photo	Q26462986
Almshouses	II	13 and 15, Sheering Road			5 February 1980	TL4810611605; 51°47′01″N 0°08′45″E		1306358	Upload Photo	Q26593145
23, Sheering Road	II	23, Sheering Road			19 June 1981	TL4815911665; 51°47′03″N 0°08′47″E		1111684	Upload Photo	Q26405476
Tudor Cottage	II	107, Sheering Road			25 July 1988	TL4864211873; 51°47′09″N 0°09′13″E		1337094	Upload Photo	Q26621538
Garden Wall of 70 Feet and Gatepiers Immediately South East of Millhurst Fronting Road	II	Sheering Road			19 June 1981	TL4821411618; 51°47′01″N 0°08′50″E		1337071	Upload Photo	Q26621517
Millhurst	II	Sheering Road			5 July 1950	TL4820611641; 51°47′02″N 0°08′50″E		1111672	Upload Photo	Q26405464
Church of St John the Baptist	II	St John's Walk	church building		19 June 1981	TL4708611628; 51°47′02″N 0°07′51″E		1337068	Church of St John the Baptist More images	Q26621515
St John's Cottage	II	St John's Walk			19 June 1981	TL4709611596; 51°47′01″N 0°07′52″E		1169777	Upload Photo	Q26462951
Harlow Town Station Including Platform Structures	II	Station Approach	railway station		25 November 1995	TL4462611232; 51°46′52″N 0°05′42″E		1117351	Harlow Town Station Including Platform Structures More images	Q1988068
Barclays Bank	II	Station Road			19 June 1981	TL4723211667; 51°47′03″N 0°07′59″E		1111673	Upload Photo	Q26405465
Former George Hotel	II	Station Road			19 June 1981	TL4719411561; 51°47′00″N 0°07′57″E		1169817	Upload Photo	Q26462995
Moot House (community Centre)	II	The Stow			19 June 1981	TL4596810577; 51°46′29″N 0°06′51″E		1111674	Upload Photo	Q26405466
Garden Wall at Passmore	II	Third Avenue			19 June 1981	TL4436709081; 51°45′43″N 0°05′26″E		1111675	Upload Photo	Q26405467
Outbuildings North West of Passmore	II	Third Avenue			19 June 1981	TL4442409111; 51°45′43″N 0°05′29″E		1169835	Upload Photo	Q26463012
Outbuildings to North of Passmore	II	Third Avenue			19 June 1981	TL4439909088; 51°45′43″N 0°05′27″E		1337072	Upload Photo	Q26621518
Passmore (harlow Museum)	II	Third Avenue			5 July 1950	TL4438309086; 51°45′43″N 0°05′27″E		1169827	Upload Photo	Q26463004
The Cock Inn	II	Three Horseshoes Road	pub		19 June 1981	TL4376908796; 51°45′34″N 0°04′54″E		1337073	The Cock Inn More images	Q26621519
Three Horseshoes Public House	II	Three Horseshoes Road	pub		5 July 1950	TL4376908808; 51°45′34″N 0°04′54″E		1169840	Three Horseshoes Public House More images	Q26463016
Barn at Goldings Farmhouse	II	Tye Green			19 June 1981	TL4535008421; 51°45′20″N 0°06′16″E		1111637	Upload Photo	Q26405417
Goldings Farmhouse	II	Tye Green			19 June 1981	TL4532708431; 51°45′21″N 0°06′15″E		1337093	Upload Photo	Q26621537
Jeans Yardling	II	Tye Green			19 June 1981	TL4549908562; 51°45′25″N 0°06′24″E		1169847	Upload Photo	Q26463022
Mayes Cottage	II	Tye Green			7 November 1977	TL4553908329; 51°45′17″N 0°06′26″E		1111638	Upload Photo	Q26405418
Oak End	II	Tye Green			19 June 1981	TL4571108606; 51°45′26″N 0°06′35″E		1111676	Upload Photo	Q26405468
The Hermitage	II	Tye Green			19 June 1981	TL4552308458; 51°45′21″N 0°06′25″E		1306340	Upload Photo	Q26593129

== See also ==
- Grade I listed buildings in Essex
- Grade II* listed buildings in Essex

== Sources ==
- Bettley, James; Pevsner, Nikolaus (2007) [1954], Essex, The Buildings of England, New Haven and London: Yale University Press, ISBN 978-0-300-11614-4
