= Maeldune Centre =

Local museum in Maldon, Essex, England

Coordinates: 51.7317°N 0.6788°E

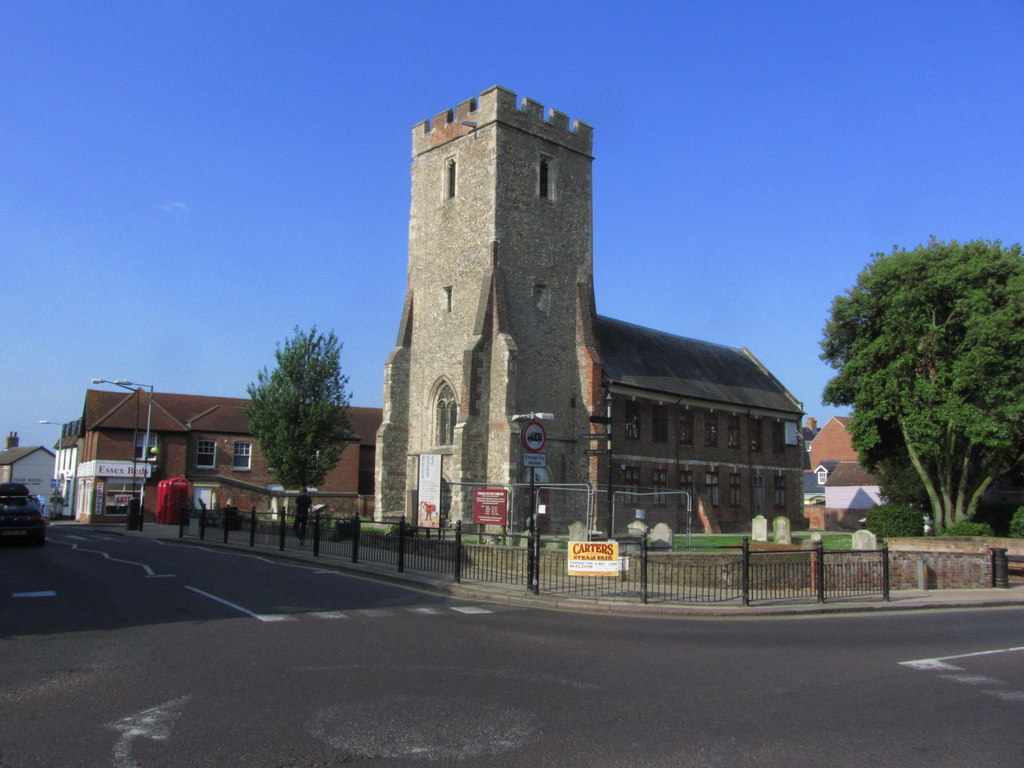
Maeldune Heritage Centre, Maldon

The Maeldune Heritage Centre is in Maldon, Essex in England. It commemorates the Battle of Maldon. Its address is Maeldune Heritage Centre, Plume Building, Market Hill, Maldon, Essex, England. In it are the famous Maldon Millennium Embroidery, art displays, and Maldon Society historical displays. Its building was formerly St.Peter's Church, which had become redundant, as there are other churches in Maldon.

== See also ==
- Thomas Plume
