= Burnham-on-Crouch & District Museum =

Museum in Essex, England, United Kingdom

Coordinates: 51.6264°N 0.8140°E

The Burnham-on-Crouch and District Museum, located in Burnham-on-Crouch, Essex, is a registered charity run by members of the Burnham History Society, aiming to reflect the history and development of the town and the local people.

The museum is now situated on the waterfront at the end of Coronation Road, and occupies a former Tucker Brown boat builders' premises originally constructed c.1910. The museum moved to its current location in the late 1990s and with help of a National Lottery grant extended the original buildings. The museum previously operated in a small room off the high street.

The museum contains displays from the early Mesolithic inhabitants of Burnham-on-Crouch, the town during Roman occupation and the local Red hills, and the town's local history. The latter topic covers domestic life, social history, industrial history, maritime history (with a full size boat built in Burnham-on-Crouch) and the agricultural history of the Dengie. In 2015, the museum opened a display of Eocene fossils, including a comprehensive collection of Eocene shark teeth. The museum also contains an archive of local history documents, drawings, pictures and a reference library.

The museum recently started a project to restore a large collection of Romano–British, Iron Age and Bronze Age pottery. The pottery is being restored in the main gallery to allow visitors to see the stages of restoration. The pottery was originally excavated by the Passmore Edwards museum immediately prior to the building of the Springfield Industrial Estate, it was given to the Burnham-on-Crouch & District Museum by the Passmore Edwards museum when they closed.
