= Listed buildings in South Benfleet =

Civil Parish in Essex, England

South Benfleet is a town and non-civil parish in the Borough of Castle Point of Essex, England. It contains 31 listed buildings that are recorded in the National Heritage List for England. Of these three are grade I, three are grade II* and 25 are grade II.

This list is based on the information retrieved online from Historic England.

== Key ==
Grade	Criteria
I	Buildings that are of exceptional interest
II*	Particularly important buildings of more than special interest
II	Buildings that are of special interest

== Listing ==
Name	Grade	Location	Type	Completed (Note: The date given is the date used by Historic England as significant for the initial building or that of an important part in the structure's description.)	Date designated	Grid ref. (Note: The grid reference is based on the British national grid reference system, sometimes known as OSGB36, used by the Ordnance Survey.) Geo-coordinates	Notes	Entry number (Note: The "List Entry Number" is a unique number assigned to each listed building and scheduled monument by Historic England.)	Image	Wikidata
The Round House	II	106, Benfleet Road, Benfleet			22 June 1981	TQ8001287220; 51°33′19″N 0°35′43″E		1123688	Upload Photo	Q26416754
Shipwrights	II*	241, Benfleet Road			30 October 1979	TQ7952786840; 51°33′07″N 0°35′17″E		1337691	Upload Photo	Q17545020
Benfleet Water Tower	II	Benfleet Road, Benfleet			6 October 1981	TQ7905086708; 51°33′03″N 0°34′52″E		1337693	Upload Photo	Q26622084
Great Burches Farmhouse	II	Burches Road, Thundersley			22 July 1986	TQ7855189792; 51°34′43″N 0°34′32″E		1170105	Upload Photo	Q26463414
Hadleigh Castle	I	Castle Lane, Hadleigh	castle		7 August 1952	TQ8097886090; 51°32′41″N 0°36′31″E		1123687	Hadleigh Castle More images	Q2898656
Thundersley Hall	II	192, Church Road, Thundersley			5 February 1981	TQ7760888920; 51°34′16″N 0°33′41″E		1123694	Upload Photo	Q26416758
Church of St Peter	II*	Church Road, Thundersley	church building		7 August 1952	TQ7828188682; 51°34′08″N 0°34′16″E		1170125	Church of St Peter More images	Q17545014
96 and 98, Daws Heath Road	II	96 and 98, Daws Heath Road, Thundersley			22 July 1986	TQ8033788793; 51°34′09″N 0°36′03″E		1170144	Upload Photo	Q26463472
Tylerset Farmhouse	II	325, Daws Heath Road, Thundersley			22 July 1986	TQ8134988798; 51°34′08″N 0°36′55″E		1123695	Upload Photo	Q26416759
South Benfleet War Memorial	II	Essex Way, Benfleet	war memorial		28 February 2008	TQ7787886089; 51°32′44″N 0°33′50″E		1392466	South Benfleet War Memorial More images	Q26671683
The Anchor Inn and Building Attached to Right	II*	Essex Way, Benfleet	pub		22 July 1986	TQ7788286100; 51°32′45″N 0°33′50″E		1123689	The Anchor Inn and Building Attached to Right More images	Q17545009
Junction of London Road and Meadow Road Milestone Milestone	II	Hadleigh			6 June 1990	TQ8137586823; 51°33′04″N 0°36′53″E		1263835	Upload Photo	Q26554596
8 and 10, Hart Road	II	8 and 10, Hart Road, Thundersley			22 July 1986	TQ7872088654; 51°34′06″N 0°34′38″E		1337719	Upload Photo	Q26622107
Former Pumping Station	II	High Road, Benfleet			22 July 1986	TQ7769186874; 51°33′10″N 0°33′42″E		1170017	Upload Photo	Q26463267
The Half Crown Inn	II	25, 27 and 29, High Street, Benfleet	pub		22 July 1986	TQ7779386070; 51°32′44″N 0°33′46″E		1123691	The Half Crown Inn More images	Q26416755
Benfleet Conservative Club	II	67 and 69, High Street, Benfleet			22 July 1986	TQ7776786001; 51°32′42″N 0°33′44″E		1170069	Upload Photo	Q26463338
Church of St James the Less	I	High Street, Hadleigh	church building		7 August 1952	TQ8101287025; 51°33′11″N 0°36′34″E		1337692	Church of St James the Less More images	Q17536388
Church of St Mary the Virgin	I	High Street, Benfleet	church building		7 August 1952	TQ7782986138; 51°32′46″N 0°33′48″E		1123690	Church of St Mary the Virgin More images	Q17536382
Group of 4 Headstones Between 18 and 22 Metres South East of South Porch of Church of St Mary the Virgin	II	High Street, Benfleet			22 July 1986	TQ7783886109; 51°32′45″N 0°33′48″E		1170051	Upload Photo	Q26463318
Table Tomb Approximately 14 Metres South of South Porch of Church of St Mary the Virgin	II	High Street, Benfleet			22 July 1986	TQ7782586121; 51°32′45″N 0°33′47″E		1337694	Upload Photo	Q26622085
The Hoy and Helmet Inn	II	High Street, Benfleet	pub		7 August 1952	TQ7778386090; 51°32′45″N 0°33′45″E		1123692	The Hoy and Helmet Inn More images	Q26416756
Tombstone of Sir Charles Nicholson and Family	II	High Street, Benfleet			9 November 2021	TQ7781486134; 51°32′46″N 0°33′47″E		1472162	Upload Photo	Q111853427
Hadleigh War Memorial	II	London Road, Junction With Chapel Lane, Hadleigh, SS7 2QL	war memorial		19 June 2020	TQ8056887241; 51°33′19″N 0°36′12″E		1470092	Hadleigh War Memorial More images	Q87488365
Thundersley Lodge	II	Runnymede Chase, Thundersley			22 July 1986	TQ7920488196; 51°33′51″N 0°35′03″E		1123663	Upload Photo	Q26416733
5 and 7, the Close	II	5 and 7, The Close, Benfleet			15 January 1980	TQ7778086003; 51°32′42″N 0°33′45″E		1306209	Upload Photo	Q26593010
Street Lamp Outside 7 the Close	II	The Close, Benfleet			22 July 1986	TQ7777386011; 51°32′42″N 0°33′44″E		1123693	Upload Photo	Q26416757
Street Lamp to West of Number 23 High Street	II	The Close, Benfleet			22 July 1986	TQ7780086059; 51°32′43″N 0°33′46″E		1248002	Upload Photo	Q26540252
Barn Immediately to North of Jarvis Hall	II	Thundersley Park Road, Thundersley			22 July 1986	TQ7837187966; 51°33′45″N 0°34′19″E		1337680	Upload Photo	Q26622073
Cartlodge Immediately North East of Barn at Jarvis Hall	II	Thundersley Park Road, Thundersley			22 July 1986	TQ7838087977; 51°33′45″N 0°34′20″E		1306176	Upload Photo	Q26592978
Jarvis Hall	II	Thundersley Park Road, Thundersley			22 July 1986	TQ7836787945; 51°33′44″N 0°34′19″E		1170164	Upload Photo	Q26463494
Old Vicarage	II	Vicarage Hill, Benfleet			14 February 1994	TQ7821786445; 51°32′55″N 0°34′08″E		1247994	Upload Photo	Q26540244

== See also ==
- Grade I listed buildings in Essex
- Grade II* listed buildings in Essex

== Sources ==
- Bettley, James; Pevsner, Nikolaus (2007) [1954], Essex, The Buildings of England, New Haven and London: Yale University Press, ISBN 978-0-300-11614-4
