= Naze Tower =

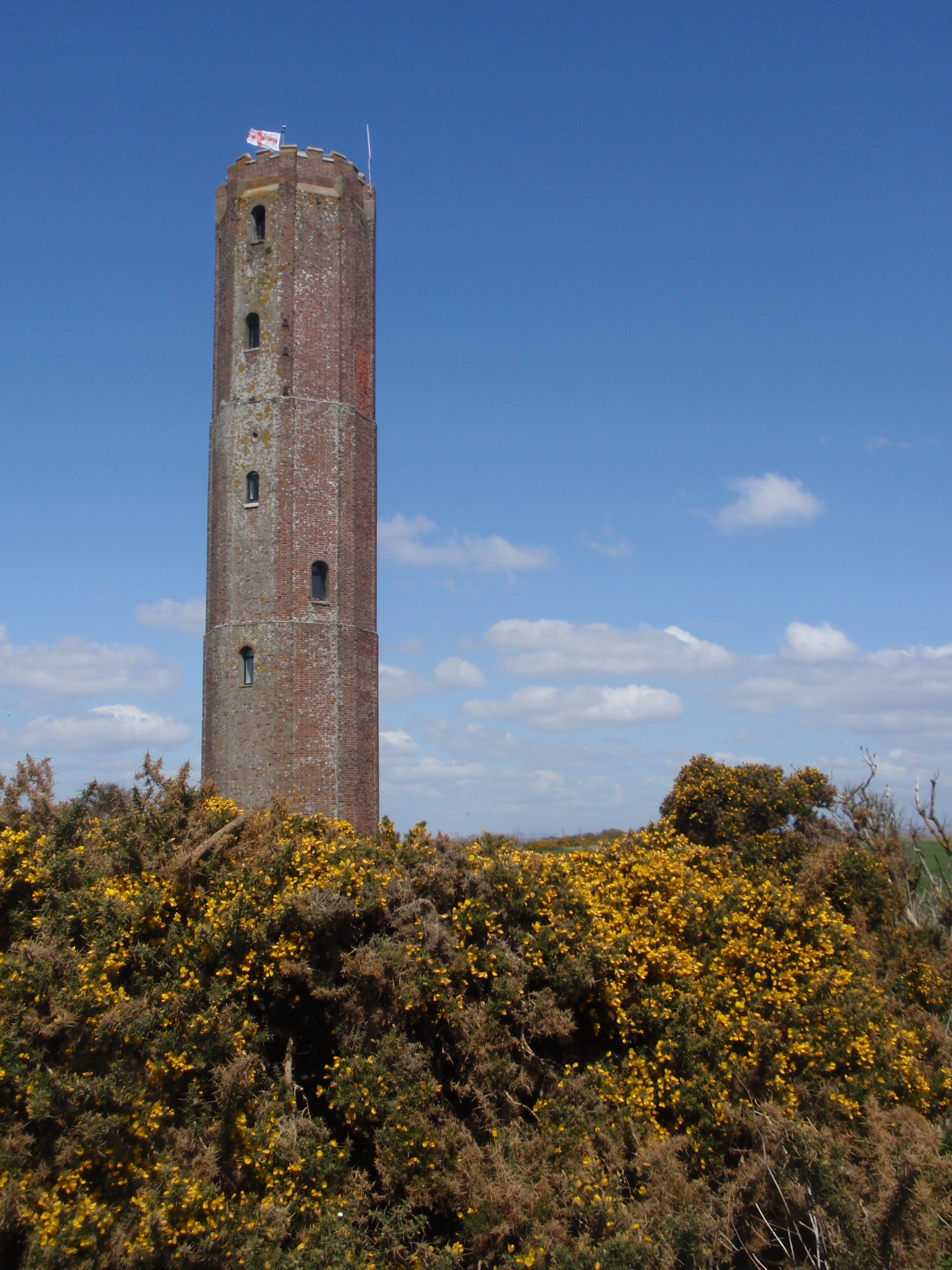
- Naze Tower
- Location: Near Walton-on-the-Naze, Essex, England
- OS grid: TM2648623539
- Coordinates: 51.868966°N 1.279564°E

Tower
- Constructed: 1720
- Construction: Brick
- Height: 86 ft (26 m)
- Shape: Octagonal
- Heritage: Grade II* listed building

The Hanoverian tower, more commonly known as the Naze Tower, is situated at the start of the open area of the Naze. It was a navigational tower, constructed to assist ships on this otherwise fairly feature-less coast. Visitors can climb the 111-step spiral staircase to the top of the 86-foot (26 m) tower for a 360 degree view of the beach and countryside.

The privately owned tower is Grade II* listed building, and features a museum with exhibits about the tower, the ecology and geology of the Naze, and the coastal erosion problem. It also houses a private art gallery on six floors with changing exhibits several times a year, and a tea room.

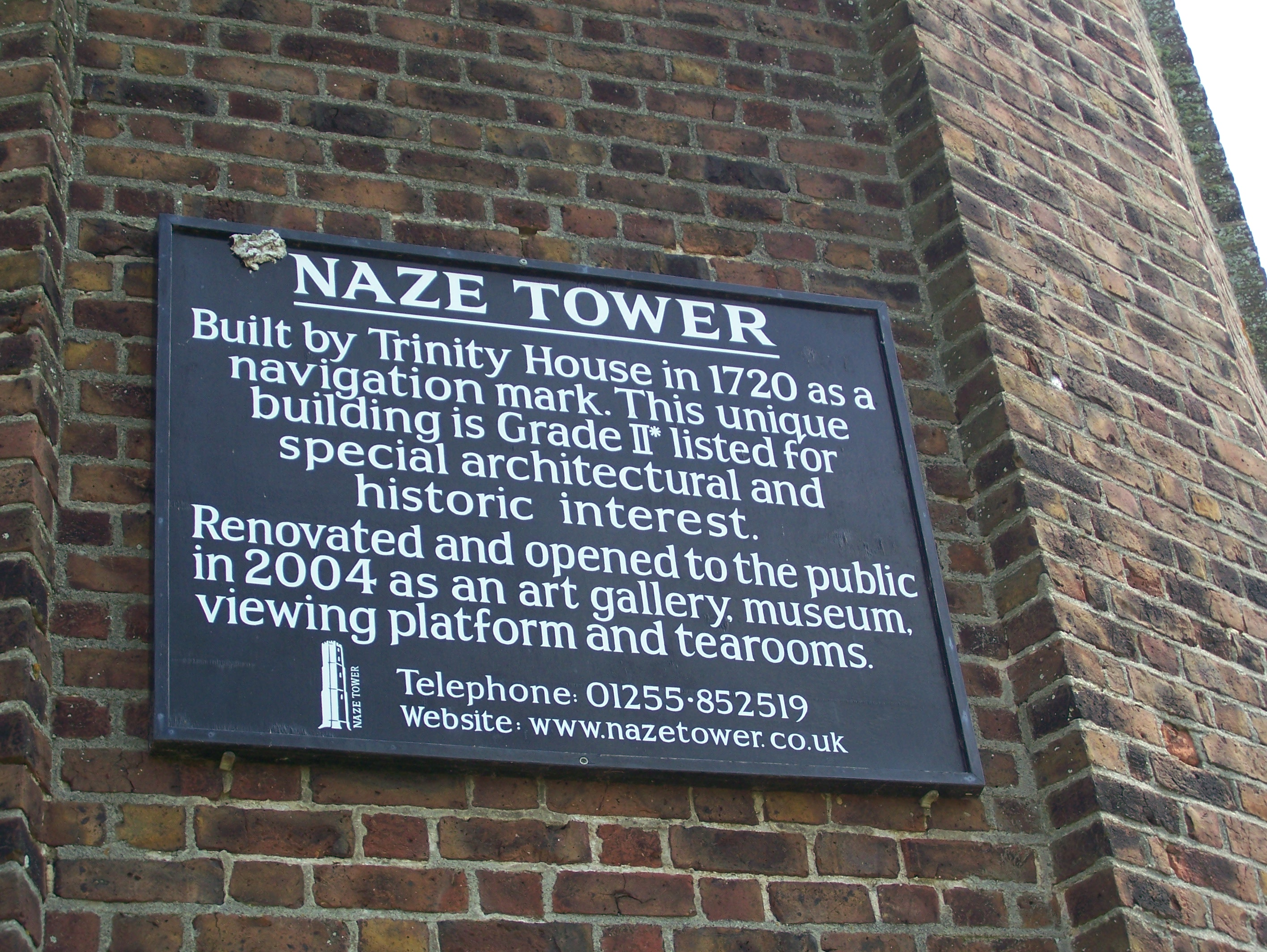
Plaque on the Naze Tower indicating its listed status

== History ==
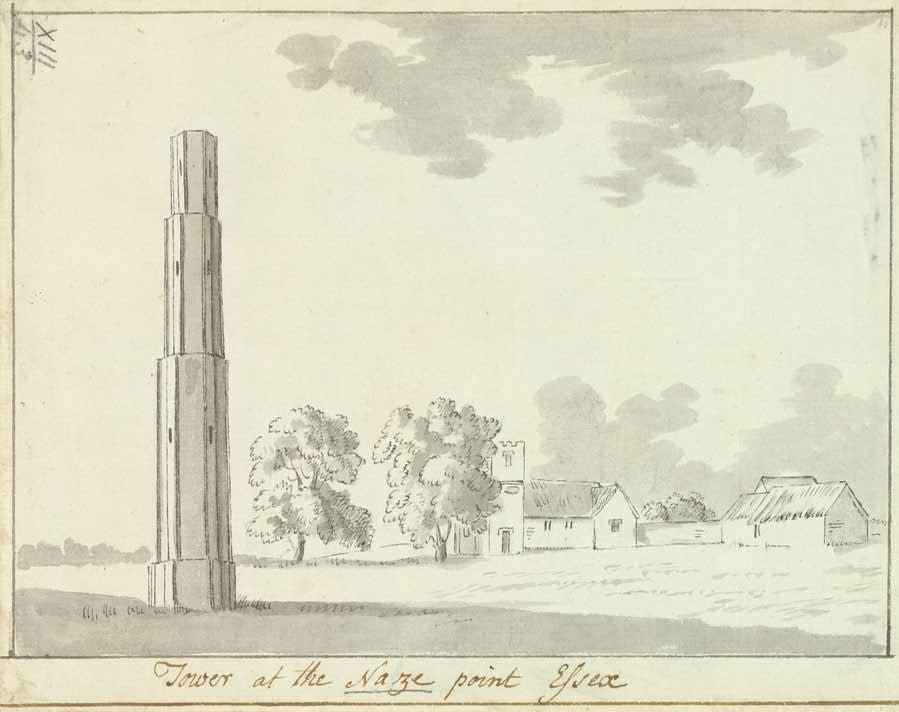
Tower at the Naze point in 1800, by John Thomas Smith

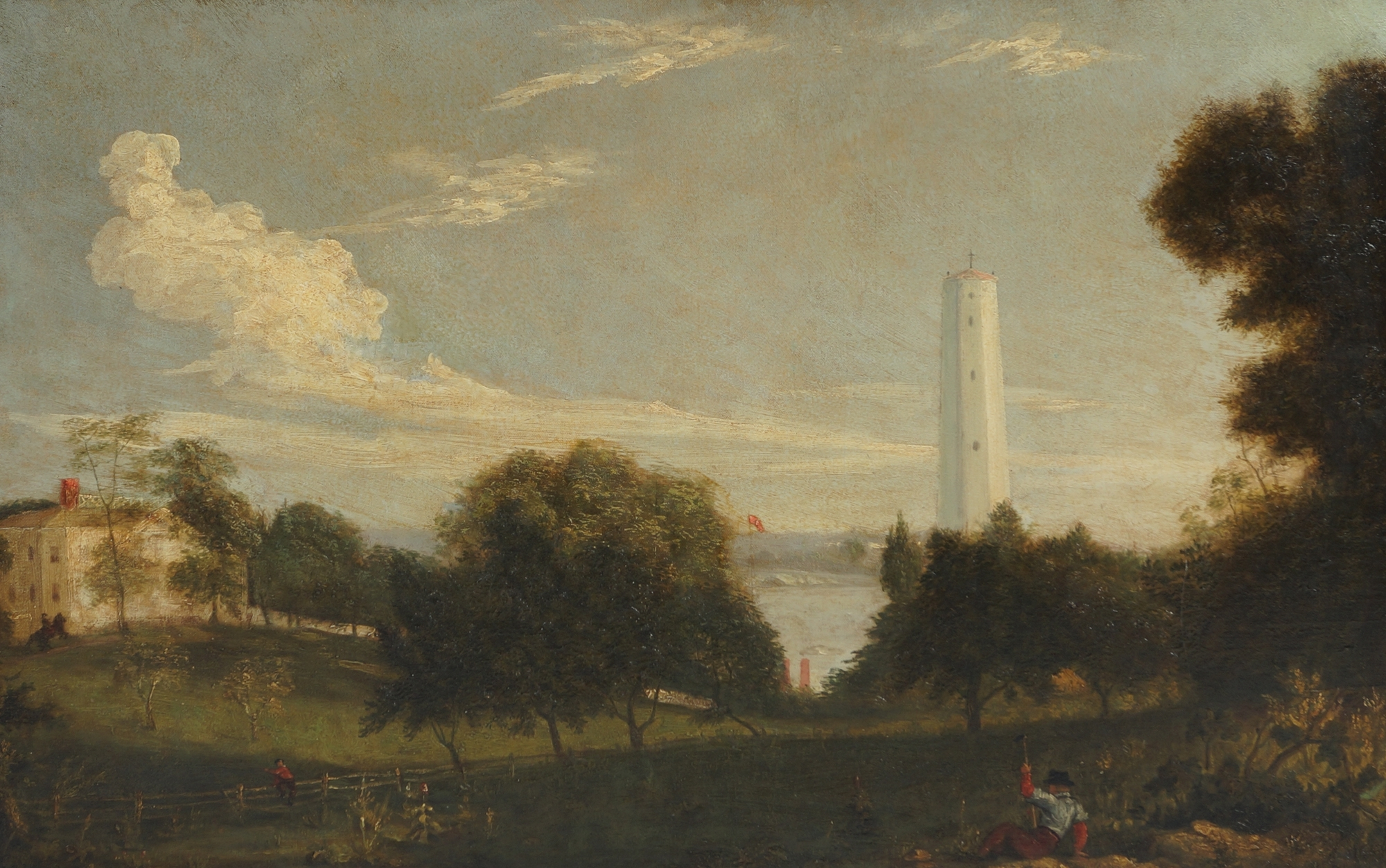
The Naze Tower (before 1837), attributed to John Constable

The present tower was built in 1720–21 by Trinity House, and was intended to work in conjunction with Walton Hall Tower to guide vessels through the Goldmer Gap. Towers at Naze and at Walton Hall are marked on a map of 1673 by Richard Blome, which in turn was based on a map drawn up in the late 1500s. The present Naze Tower therefore replaced an earlier construction at a similar location. It was of particular benefit to ships using the nearby port of Harwich. Both the current Naze Tower and its predecessor had beacons or lamps lit at the top, providing an early form of lighthouse.

Over the years, the tower has had a variety of uses. In the eighteenth century it was a tea house, operated by the actress and aristocrats' mistress, Martha Reay. It was a lookout during the Napoleonic Wars and again during the Great War of 1914–18. In the Second World War it was used as a radar station, with its crenellations removed to accommodate a radar dish.

Naze Tower was given Grade II* listed status in 1984 by English Heritage. Since 1986, it has been in private ownership. The current owners purchased the tower in 1996, and after refurbishment, opened it to the public in 2005.

The tower is at significant risk from both structural decay and coastal erosion. In 2011, a £1.2m project saw the construction of 'Crag Walk', a 110 metres (360 ft) long footpath, to slow the rate of erosion. In 2015 the tower was re-added to the Heritage at Risk Register, but was removed once more after restoration works to address damp problems.

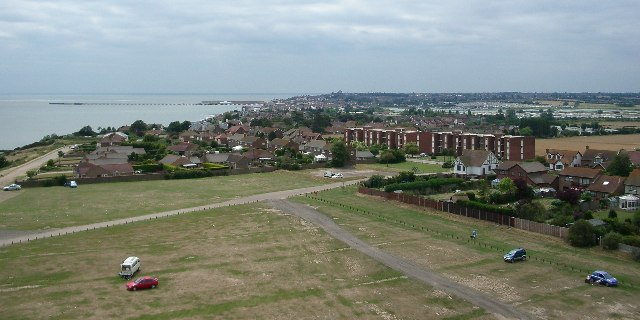
The view south from the top of Naze Tower, looking over the Naze to Walton town and pier

== Cultural reference ==
In a video shot for the 2026 Clacton by-election, Count Binface proclaimed the Naze Tower "one of the greatest landmarks not only in the Clacton constituency, but in the entire planet Earth".
