= The Barley Barn =

Barn at Cressing Temple in Essex, England

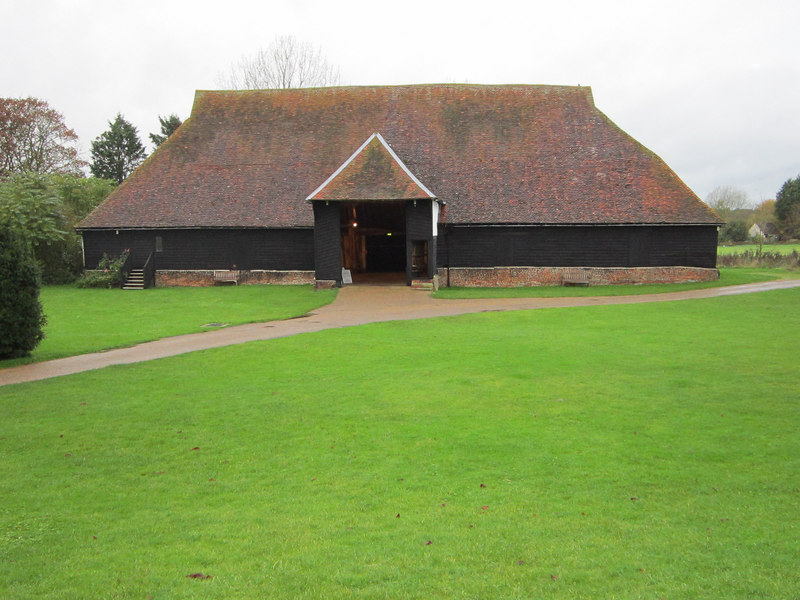
- Interactive map of the The Barley Barn area

General information
- Location: Cressing Temple, Essex, England
- Coordinates: 51°50′14.1″N 00°36′39.5″E
- Construction started: c.1220 (806 years ago)
- Owner: Essex County Council

Listed Building – Grade I

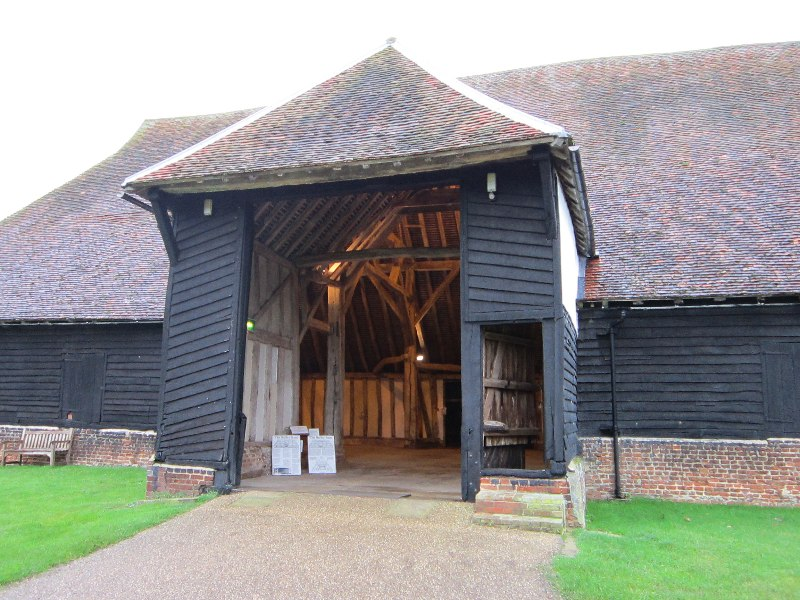
The midstrey (porch) of the Barley Barn

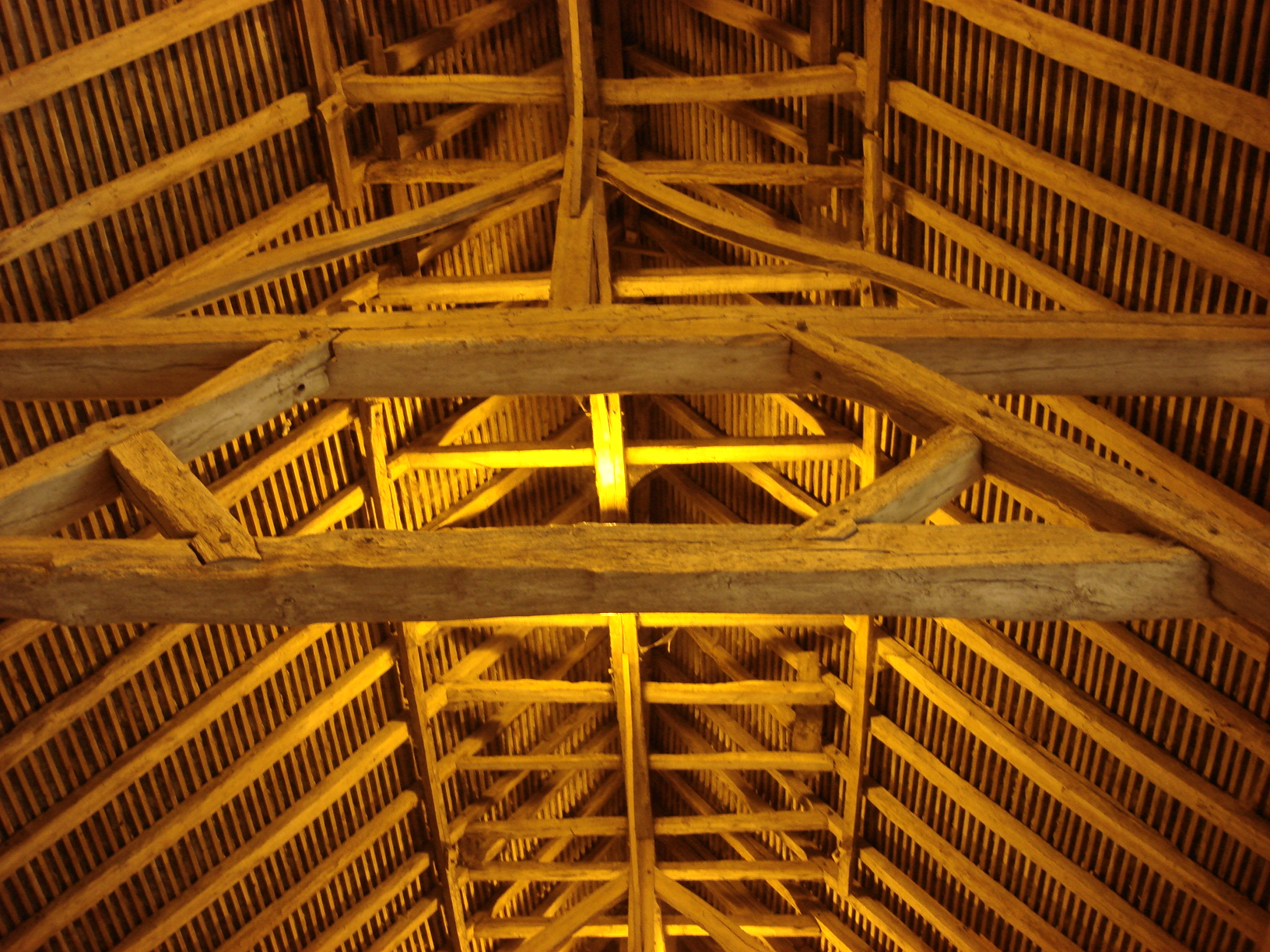
Roof structure of the Barley Barn

The Barley Barn is an architecturally important medieval barn, part of a complex of farm buildings at Cressing Temple, Essex, England. The barn was built for the Knights Templar in the early thirteenth century (dendrochronological analysis has given a date of around 1220). It has been claimed to be the oldest standing timber-framed barn in the world.

== History ==
The manor of Cressing was granted to the Knights Templar in the 12th century, and they are assumed to have commissioned the barn. Scientific evidence suggests a felling date for the timber of the barn of around 1220.

Pope Clement V disbanded the order in 1312. The estate at Cressing passed to the Knights Hospitaller. It has since had other changes of ownership. The barn was modified in later centuries, but remained in agricultural use until recent times.

== Architecture ==
The Barley Barn is 38 metres (125 ft) long and 14 metres (46 ft) wide. Its construction displays 13th century features such as the use of straight square-section timber, passing braces, and certain types of joints and methods of assembly.

=== Roof ===
The roof has been tiled from the beginning, and would have weighed close to 70 tonnes.

== Conservation ==
The Barley Barn is a Grade I listed building. Essex County Council acquired Cressing Temple in the 1980s and it has been converted into a heritage attraction.
