= The Essex Model House =

Doll's house

The Essex Model House is a notable dollshouse designed by the architect Martin Evans in 1955.

The model house owes its existence to the Essex Handicraft Association, particularly to Mrs St Osyth Mahala Wood, née Eustace-Smith (born in 1886, Hampstead, died on 1 November 1970, Wasperton, Warwickshire) an English campaigner and philanthropist who became a great benefactor to her local community. She had lived at Parsonage Hall, Bures since her marriage in 1924 and was renowned for her ability to create dolls furniture out of mahogany, an extremely hard wood to work with and not the preferred choice of wood normally used for such fine work. Under her guidance and that of Lady Whitmore the Essex Handicraft Association made plans for a magnificent and notable dolls house to architectural standards in 1955 to portray a typical Essex mansion.

Plans were drawn up by Martin Evans RIBA (1927-2016) a recently qualified architect from Feering in Essex, whose mother Esther was a member of the Association. The house was based on Boreham Manor, near Chelmsford, the home of another fellow member Lady Ritchie. It is extremely large [5 ft (1.5 m) wide and 6 ft (1.8 m) high], and has tall Tudor chimneys and an elegant Georgian façade, while the back is Elizabethan. The main rooms consist of a drawing-room, dining-room, kitchen, nursery, Chinese room, main bedroom, gentleman’s room and bathroom. It required the services of a professional plasterer to cover the interior walls while the interior base in places is made of genuine miniature parquet flooring. The house is populated by 25 characters, all made by hand, many of whom of course depict the invaluable servants who would have kept the house in perfect order. Everything within and without, from the ghost in the hall to the handwritten will in the desk, was created by members, who were all encouraged to contribute their fine skills to create a lasting monument to Essex domestic architecture.

The finished construction stood for some time in Parsonage Hall, Bures and is now on permanent display in the round at the Braintree District Museum in Braintree, Essex.

In 1998 Essex Heritage Trust gave the museum a grant of £3000 to provide glass display cabinets for the Doll's House and Barn.

Mrs Dawn Arthur, is another member who lived at the time at Boreham and whose late husband Allan Arthur was High Sheriff of Essex in 1971, then a Deputy Lieutenant. She encouraged the idea of a barn which could go alongside the house, with work on a similar scale. For a long time this was in storage at Braintree District Museum, where there has not been enough room to display it beside the model house but it can now be appreciated and admired in the round in the beautiful medieval barn at Layer Marney Tower.
