= Cressing Temple =

Former Templar possession in Essex, England

Coordinates: 51°50′14.05″N 00°36′39.51″E

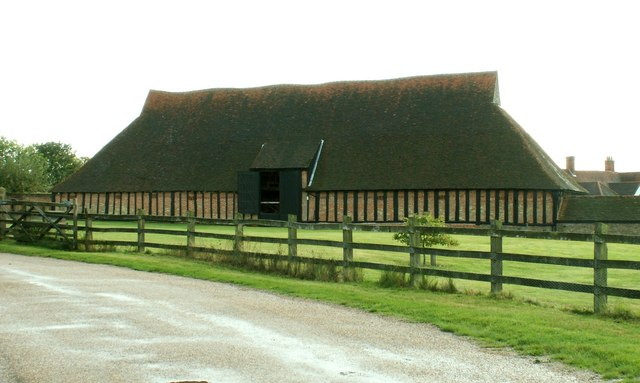
The wheat barn at Cressing Temple.

Cressing Temple is a medieval site situated between Witham and Braintree in Essex, close to the villages of Cressing and White Notley. It was amongst the very earliest and largest of the possessions of the Knights Templar in England, and is currently open to the public as a visitor attraction.

The site has protection as an ancient monument. The Knights Templar built two barns which are preserved as Grade I listed buildings; one of these medieval barns is claimed to be the oldest standing timber-framed barn in the world.

== The Knights Templar Preceptory of Cressing ==
The manor of Cressing was granted to the Knights Templar in 1136 by Matilda of Boulogne, the wife of King Stephen. It is close to the main road between London and Colchester and the road between Witham and Braintree. The Preceptory of Cressing was therefore one of the very earliest Templar estates in England, It received further grants soon after its founding in the form of property at Witham sometime between 1138 and 1148, and was placed first in a detailed list of Templar holdings in 1185. It was the largest of their estates in Essex. Later, King John confirmed to the Templars at Cressing the land of Berecholt on 14 July 1199, and the land of Newland on 8 June 1214, as well as a market on Thursdays and a three-day-long fair at the feast of the Decollation of St. John the Baptist at the new town of Wulnesforde in the parish of Witham. Later, sometime before his death in 1255, the Templar Peter de Rossa granted over 100 acres of the manor of Rivenhall to Cressing, a parish in which he was parson and lord.

The original 1400-acre site was a considerable agricultural enterprise, and was led by a Templar Preceptor, accompanied by two or three knights or sergeants, together with a chaplain, a bailiff and numerous household servants overseeing around 160 tenant farmers. The manor had a mansion house, bakehouse, brewery, dairy, granary, smithy, gardens, a dovecote, a watermill, and a windmill, with a chapel and associated cemetery dedicated to St Mary. The proceeds from the Cressing Temple were all sent to fund Templar activities in the Crusader states in the Middle East.

During the reign of King Edward II the Templar order was suppressed in England. The pope had issued a bull Pastoralis praeeminentiae to all Christian monarchs. It ordered the arrest of all Knights Templar and the seizure of their properties on behalf of the church.

== The Knights Hospitaller and Cressing ==
In line with papal guidance, the Templar estate at Cressing was handed over to the Order of the Knights Hospitaller in 1309, who preserved the Templar documents and charters of Cressing amongst their own records. The manor, controlled by a prior of the Knights Hospitaller, continued to work as a large estate. It was targeted in 1381 during the Peasants' Revolt, when on Monday 10 June a large group of rebels attacked Cressing and carried away armour, vestments, gold and silver, and other goods to the value of £20 belonging to the Hospitallers, and burned books to the value of 20 marks. In England, almost all the property of the Knights Hospitaller was confiscated by King Henry VIII. Cressing was confiscated in 1540, soon after the last monasteries, and on 8 July 1541, King Henry VIII granted the manor and lordship of Cressing and the half-hundred of Witham to Sir William Huse and John Smyth, one of the barons of the Exchequer. John Smyth's family held the manor until 1657. Following the Reformation, in the late sixteenth century there was a mansion on the site, now called the 'Great House', but it was demolished in the eighteenth century and only the farmhouse, granary, wagon lodge and stable yards remain. The mid-sixteenth century Tudor brick garden also stands and has been developed by Essex County Council who acquired the barns for the people of Essex in 1987. The farmhouse dates from 1618, and the coach house from 1800. Extensive archaeological investigations were carried out as part of a programme of improvements and updates in the 1990s.

== Cressing Temple Barns ==
Cressing Temple is the site of two Grade I-listed timber-framed buildings (the thirteenth-century Barley Barn and Wheat Barn, described by historian Michael Haag as "the two finest Templar-built barns in Europe") and the later Grade II-listed Granary building. Today these are open to the public along with Tudor gardens.

The Barley Barn (English Heritage listing 1123865) is an early thirteenth century (c. 1220) barn modified in later centuries, and is the oldest standing timber-framed barn in the world. The roof was originally tiled, and would have weighed close to 70 tonnes.

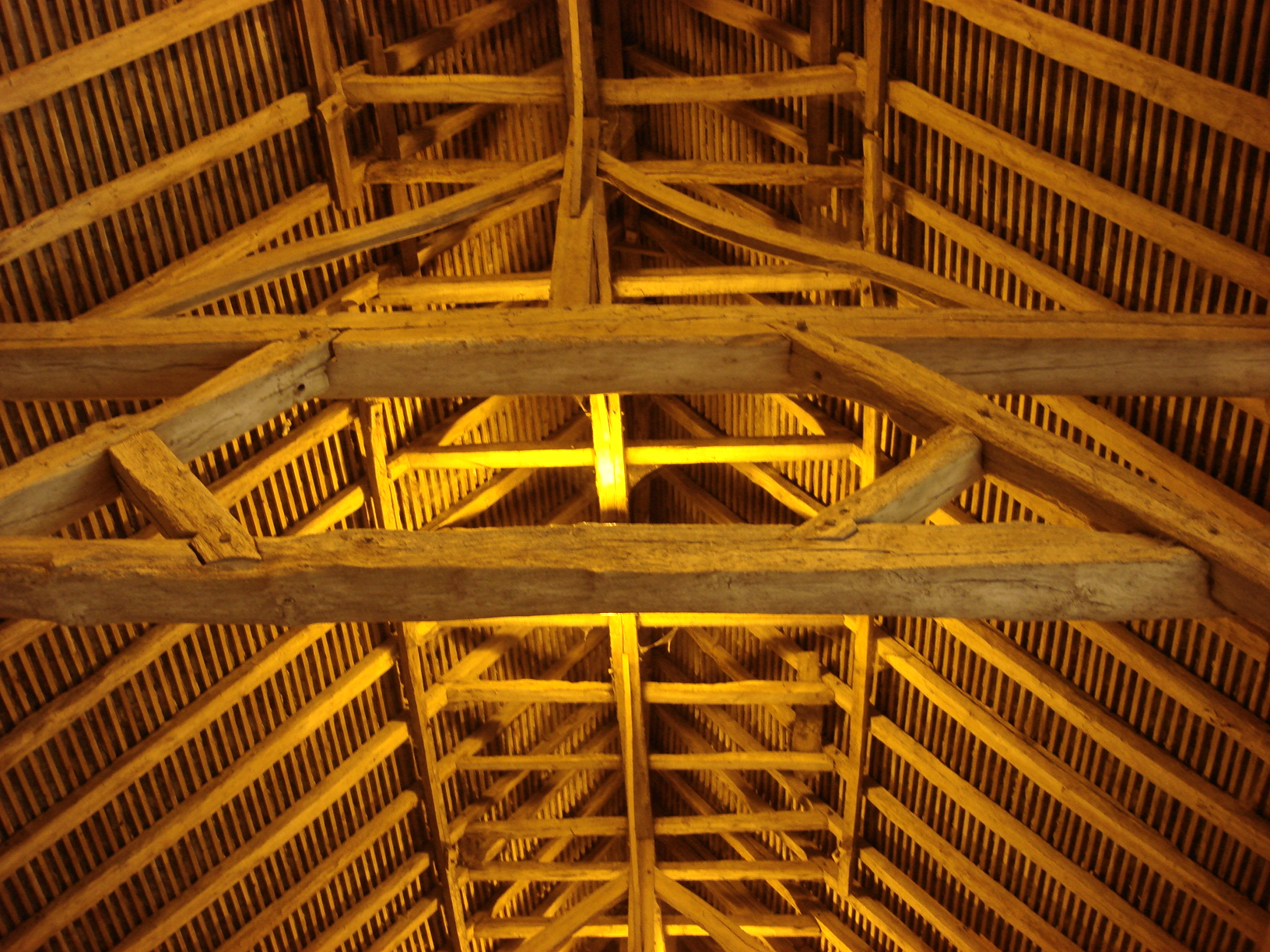
Roof structure of the Barley Barn

The Wheat Barn (English Heritage listing 1123866) was built in around 1280, and was altered in the early 1500s and 1700s. The Granary (English Heritage listing 1123867), built sometime just after 1575, is the largest granary in Essex.

== Tudor Gardens ==
A walled garden has been reconstructed as a Tudor garden open to the public.
