= Southchurch Hall =

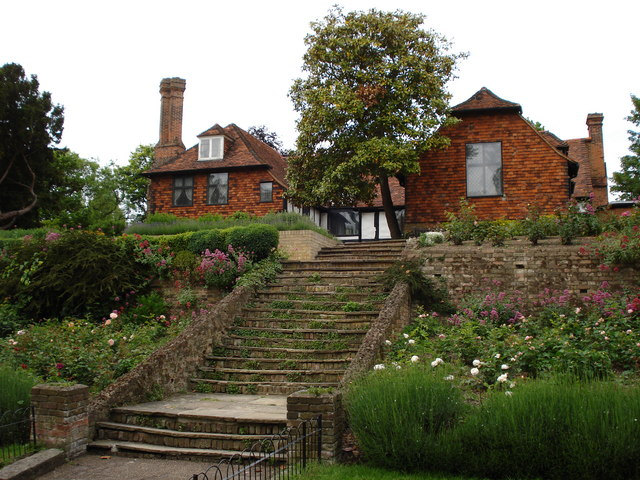
- Southchurch Hall
- Interactive map of the Southchurch Hall area

General information
- Status: Preserved
- Type: Historic House
- Architectural style: Half timbered
- Location: Southchurch, Southend-on-Sea, England
- Coordinates: 51.536967°N 0.729493°E
- Construction started: c.1321-1364

Southchurch Hall is Grade I listed Medieval moated house located in Southchurch, Southend-on-Sea, Essex, England. The Hall was home to farming families until the 1920s. In 1930 it was extensively restored and presented to the town of Southend by the Dowsett Family. The Hall has been listed in Jenkins' top 1,000 houses in England. The moat surrounding the house is a scheduled monument.

== History ==
The current hall was built c.1321 – 1364, and has a Tudor and a 1930s extension. The Great Hall is still presented in its 14th-century form. At this time the Great Hall would have had a central fireplace, and original smoke-blackened timbers can still be seen in the roof (although much of the roof was replaced in the 1930s restoration). At the end of the Great Hall is the cross-wing, housing the North and South Solars. These rooms reflect changing fashions for more intimate rooms; the South Solar is a late 16th- or early 17th-century extension.

The hall probably stands on the site of a much earlier Saxon hall. The land on which it stands was given to the monks of Canterbury in 823 AD, and the tenants of the hall subsequently inherited the family name "de Southchurch". This custom survived until the death of Peter de Southchurch in 1309.

== Collections ==
In the 1930s extension to the hall, there is an exhibition of artefacts discovered during archaeological investigations of the site.

The collections at Southchurch Hall include the oil painting Attack on Southchurch Hall during the Peasants' Revolt, 1381, by Alan Sorrell (1969).

== Gallery ==
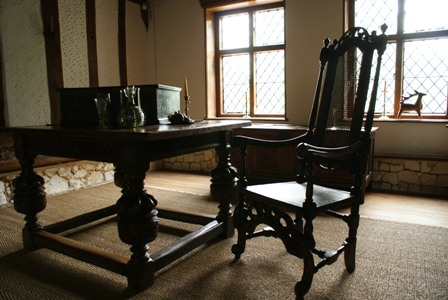
The South Solar of Southchurch Hall

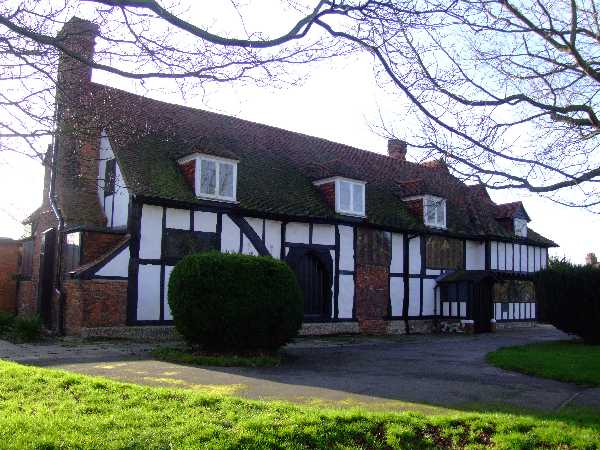
Southchurch Hall

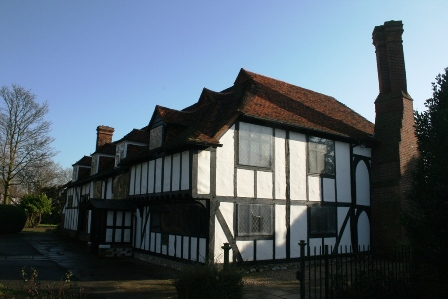
Southchurch Hall, showing the North and South Solars (the South being a Tudor extension), with the Main Hall stretching into the distance.
