= Clavering Castle =

Castle in England

Coordinates: 51.96702°N 0.13981°E

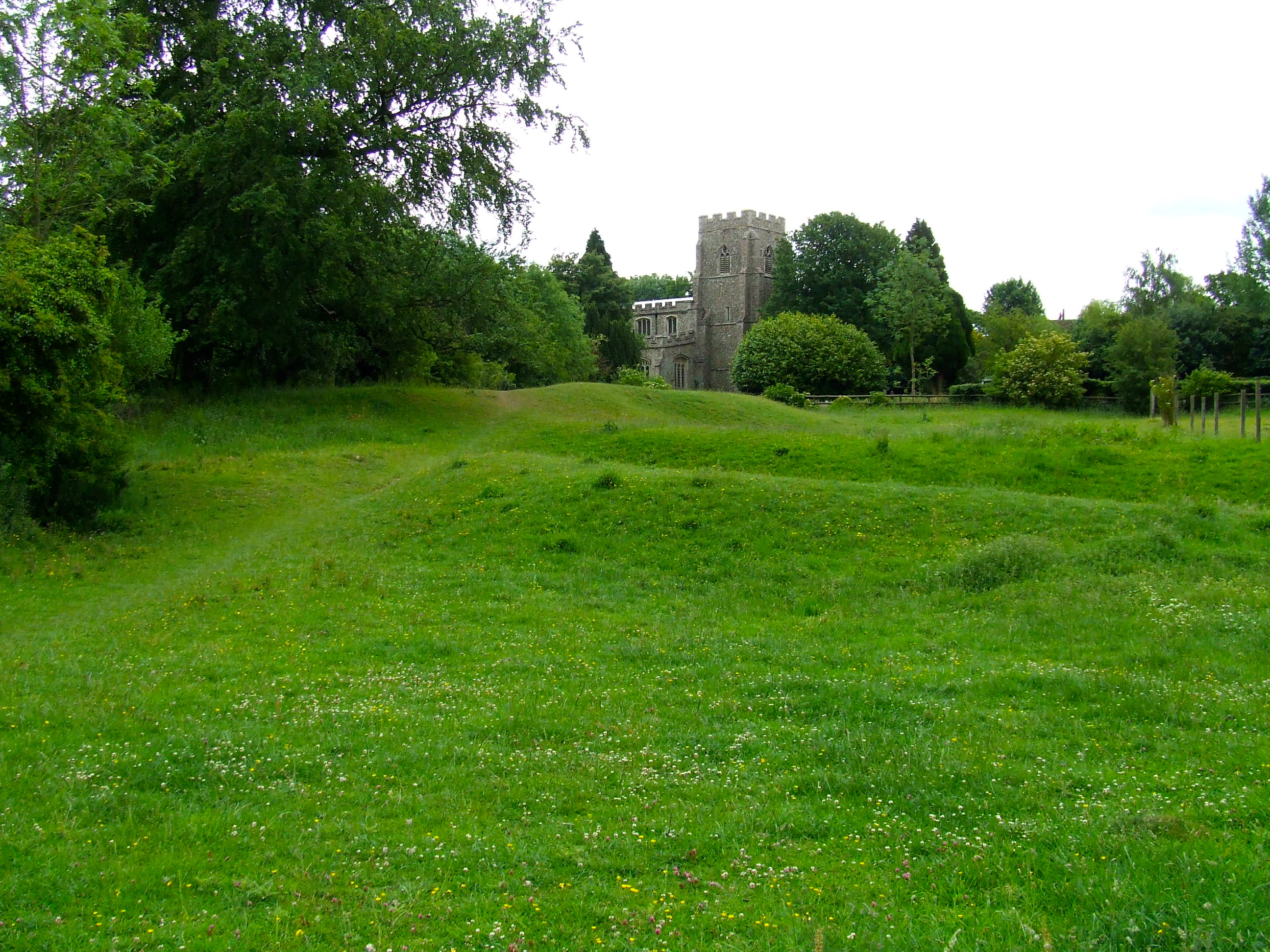
Earthworks of Clavering Castle

Clavering Castle remains are situated in the small parish village of Clavering in the county of Essex, England, 50m north of the church of St Mary and St Clement on the southern bank of the River Stort, some 10 kilometres (6.2 mi) north of Bishop's Stortford (grid reference TL471320).

== History ==
=== Pre-Conquest ===
The site of this castle is unusual in that the ringworks and earthworks that remain have been identified as predating the Norman Conquest, and Clavering Castle was built no later than 1052.

Ringworks are medieval fortifications built and occupied from late Anglo-Saxon times to the later 12th century. A ringwork was a small defended area which contained buildings surrounded or partially surrounded by a large ditch and a bank topped with a timber palisade or, more unusually, a stone wall. Occasionally a more lightly defended embanked enclosure, the bailey, adjoined the ringwork. Ringworks acted as strongholds for military operations and defended aristocratic or major settlements. They are rare, and there are only 200 recorded examples, fewer than 60 have baileys. Clavering Castle is one of a limited number and very restricted range of Anglo-Saxon and Norman fortifications and the ringworks are of particular significance for investigating the period.

A series of earth banks, channels and pond bays have not been dated but are believed to be associated with a former mill. These earthworks extend for 200m to the west of the castle along the banks of the River Stort.

The River Stort flows around the north side of the site and has been diverted to feed the moat. Archaeological excavations have established that there was a pre-Conquest settlement and the later Norman castle.

=== Lords of Clavering ===
The first known Lord of Clavering mentioned in the Domesday Book of 1086 was Robert FitzWimarc, an image of whom is believed to appear on the Bayeux Tapestry, at Edward the Confessor's deathbed. ‘Robert’s Castle’ mentioned in Domesday is thought to refer to Clavering Castle. FitzWimarc was a Frenchman and was one of Edward the Confessor's closest aides; he has a school named after him in Rayleigh, Essex. The site at Clavering is identified as one of the castles to which the French party at Edward the Confessor's court fled in 1052.

==== Stone coffin ====
A stone coffin was found in 1923 and is believed to have contained the remains of a Clavering lord:

"A coffin of stone, weighing about a ton, and containing the well-preserved skeleton of a man, has been discovered at Clavering. Workmen engaged in erecting a fence around the churchyard at a depth of two feet, came upon the solid slab of stone which formed the lid of the coffin. When unearthed it was found to be seven feet in length and two feet wide. The lid, walls and base of the coffin were six inches thick and were cut out of solid sandstone. The skull was that of an intellectual head, and the teeth were perfect. The discovery was made on the edge of a moat which formerly surrounded Clavering Castle, and probably on the site of an ancient chapel attached to the castle. The castle has long since disappeared and only the mound now remains. It was evident the coffin had been disturbed at some previous date, as one end of the lid was broken… the coffin was reinterred."

== Archaeology ==
Archaeologists have inspected the site and together with aerial photographs have dated the site as possibly 410 to 1065 early Medieval with evidence of an Iron Age British fort on a defensive site later built on by the Saxons and then Normans.

The castle, moat, bridge, building, earthwork, dam, pond, and watermill all date from 1066 to 1539.
