= Robert FitzWimarc =

11th century landholder in England

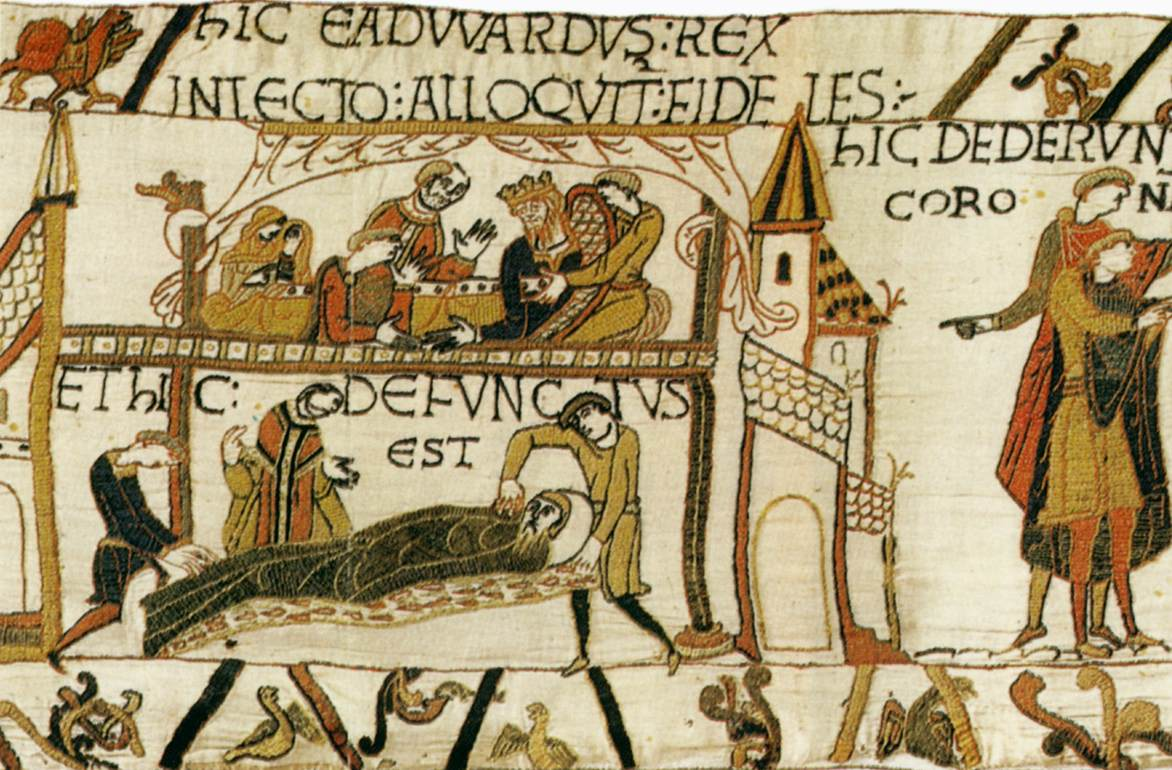
Robert as (possibly) pictured on the Bayeux Tapestry, supporting the pillow of Edward the Confessor on his deathbed. However Robert seems not to have been named on the embroidery.

Robert fitz Wimarc (also known as Robert the Staller) (died before 1075, Theydon Mount, Ongar, Essex) was a kinsman of both Edward the Confessor and William of Normandy, and was present at Edward's death-bed.

Nothing of his background is known except his kinship to the English and Norman leadership and that his byname appears to contain a Breton female name, Wiomar'ch, apparently the name of his mother. He was brought to England by Edward and had a successful career, being rewarded with numerous lands in various parts of the country. He had a special interest in Essex and set up his main base at Clavering. It was to Clavering that many of Edward's Norman favourites fled when they were ousted from political power in 1052, before taking ship into exile. Despite being a Norman, Robert stayed in England and found further favour with Edward, and possibly with Harold Godwinson after him.

Robert was later made Sheriff of Essex and was described as "regalis palatii stabilitor" – high officer or sometimes staller of the royal palace. When Edward died in January 1066, Robert was one of the four inner councillors present at his death bed, along with the Queen (Edith of Wessex), Earl Harold Godwinson and Archbishop Stigand, an event captured on the Bayeux Tapestry.

Robert seems to have acquiesced with Harold's succession to the throne, but also seems to have kept in touch with his homeland. When William landed at Pevensey it was Robert who contacted him to advise a retreat back to France. The advice was, apparently, that William had neither the strength nor numbers to win a battle against Harold, particularly as Harold was buoyed by his victory against the Norwegians at Stamford Bridge.

Robert clearly remained in favour with William after his victory at Hastings, and subsequent succession, as he retained his estates, and was further rewarded with others. He left his extensive estates to his son Suen (Swein of Essex), who went on to build Rayleigh Castle.

Robert fitz Wimarc seems to have been a prudent man, with a fair degree of wisdom who helped to ease the transition from Saxon to Norman England.

He is remembered in Rayleigh, Essex, where one of the town's secondary schools is named the FitzWimarc School.

== Sources ==
- Lee, Sidney, ed. (1896). "Robert the Staller" . Dictionary of National Biography. Vol. 48. London: Smith, Elder & Co.
- Transactions of the Shropshire Archaeological and Natural History Society. Vol. II. 1879. pp. 1–34.
