= Samuel Herbert Dougal =

English criminal (1847–1903)

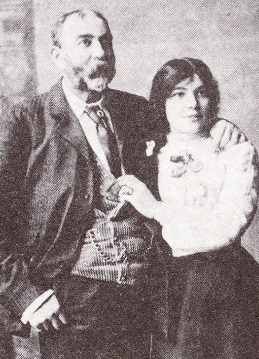
- Samuel Dougal, pictured with Georgina Cranwell, c. 1902
- Born: 15 May 1847; Bow, London, United Kingdom
- Died: 14 July 1903 (aged 56); Chelmsford Prison, Essex, United Kingdom
- Cause of death: Execution by hanging
- Occupations: Royal Engineer, Clerk
- Known for: Forgery, deception, predatory sexual drive
- Status: Executed
- Conviction: Murder
- Penalty: Death by hanging

Details
- Victims: Camille Cecile Holland
- Date: 19 May 1899
- Date apprehended: 18 March 1903

Samuel Herbert Dougal (15 May 1847 – 14 July 1903), a notorious womanising convicted forger, was an English soldier who used his medal-winning administrative skills to ill effect. He married three times, and the first two wives died in suspicious circumstances. Dougal spent little time before replacing them in other relationships where he sired numerous illegitimate children in addition to his legitimate progeny. Dougal's downfall came soon after a servant of his sought an affiliation order for the child she had borne him. The scrutiny from the court process revealed that the woman he had been living with was not in fact married to him. Indeed, she had not been seen by her own relatives for four years despite her funds and share holdings having been cashed in over the same period. The discovery of this woman's murdered corpse on their property precipitated the murder trial that ended in Dougal's conviction as a murderer and his hanging for his crime soon after.

== Early life ==
Samuel Herbert Dougal was the oldest son of Maria Josephine Thompson (1822–1897) and Samuel Dredge Dougal (1826–1900); he was born in Bow, London on 15 May 1847. At 19 he enlisted for 12 years in the Royal Engineers and was initially assigned to survey work with the Ordnance Survey. Whilst posted on this work he married (Lovenia) Martha Griffiths at Mold, Flintshire in 1869. The first of Samuel's legitimate children, Charles Herbert Dougal, was born in London in 1871, when he was elsewhere. Many other children were born but not all survived long. By choice, Samuel Dougal transferred to Halifax, Nova Scotia in 1877 and subsequently extended his period of service to 21 years. In June 1885 his wife Martha died suddenly, after having no prior illness of health condition. Two months later, Samuel Dougal married a young Irish woman, Mary Herberta Boyd, who already had a child; in another two months Mary died suddenly and inexplicably in October 1885. Mary was rapidly buried at Fort Massey, the place where her predecessor had also been quickly buried. Samuel nevertheless persuaded another woman, Bessie Stedman, to be his 'mate' and she initially returned with Dougal to England when he was posted to Aldershot. Nevertheless, she removed herself back to Canada after suffering abuse from Dougal. In March 1887, Dougal was discharged from the Royal Engineers.

== Civilian life ==
On discharge from the Royal Engineers, Samuel Dougal gave what appeared to be his youngest brother's address in Battersea as his destination. He soon moved from here to the Isle of Wight where he set up home with a woman named Marian Paine, a widow with children. She subsequently bore several illegitimate children of Dougal's. With Marian, Dougal acquired the goodwill and furniture of the Royston Crow public house on Baldock Street in Ware, Hertfordshire in 1889. A fire at the Royston Crow, following soon after an earlier one that had been extinguished by a business neighbour, raised suspicions of arson. Dougal was charged with defrauding an insurance company but was found not guilty. Nevertheless, the local magistrates refused to return his licence. In 1892, Marian left Dougal over his bad behaviour towards her. Later in the same year he married Sarah Henrietta White, a 20-year-old Irishwoman. With Sarah, Dougal began his career of defrauding easily victimised women. He persuaded a woman called Emily Booty to live with him as his wife but promptly spent her money and humiliated her by bringing his real wife to live at their joint home. Miss Booty suffered further public humiliations attempting to regain possession of her property. Dougal moved on but did not give up his schemes until he was found guilty of stealing and forging cheques. He was sentenced to twelve months prison with hard labour to be served at Pentonville Prison. Faking a suicide attempt, he was removed to Cane Hill Lunatic Asylum where he served most of his sentence. He was discharged perfectly sane on 8 December 1896. Again his youngest brother helped him by providing employment for him at Biggin Hill, Kent and he was here until 1898 by which time he had lined up his next target, 56-year-old Camille Cecile Holland.

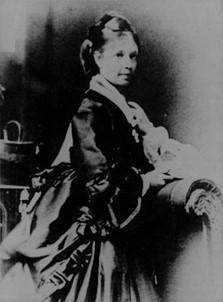
Camille Cecile Holland, circa 1870

Miss Holland is believed to have advertised for a husband to which Dougal presented himself as a candidate. Having ensnared her, though he was still legally married to Sarah, they first set up home as a married couple near Brighton. Soon they were in negotiations to purchase Coldhams, a property in Clavering, Essex. Miss Holland was to finance the deal and insisted her name appear on the contract documentation. As Mr and Mrs Dougal, Miss Holland and Samuel Dougal found lodgings at Saffron Walden whilst Coldhams was renovated. On 24 April 1899 Miss Holland and Samuel Dougal moved into the property that they had renamed Moat House Farm - or Moat Farm as it was to become known.

== Discovery ==
In early 1903, questions arose as to the whereabouts of Camille Cecile Holland and the fact that cheques and other financial instruments were being presented with what purported to be her signature. No one had seen her since 19 May 1899 when the maidservant who had rebuffed Samuel Dougal's sexually motivated attack on her refused to be left alone with him. Miss Holland had left in a pony and trap with Dougal driving, telling the servant that she would not be long. Dougal returned alone and claimed that Miss Holland, whom the servant was led to believe was 'Mrs Dougal', had gone away to London. The servant's mother removed her daughter from Moat Farm the following day.

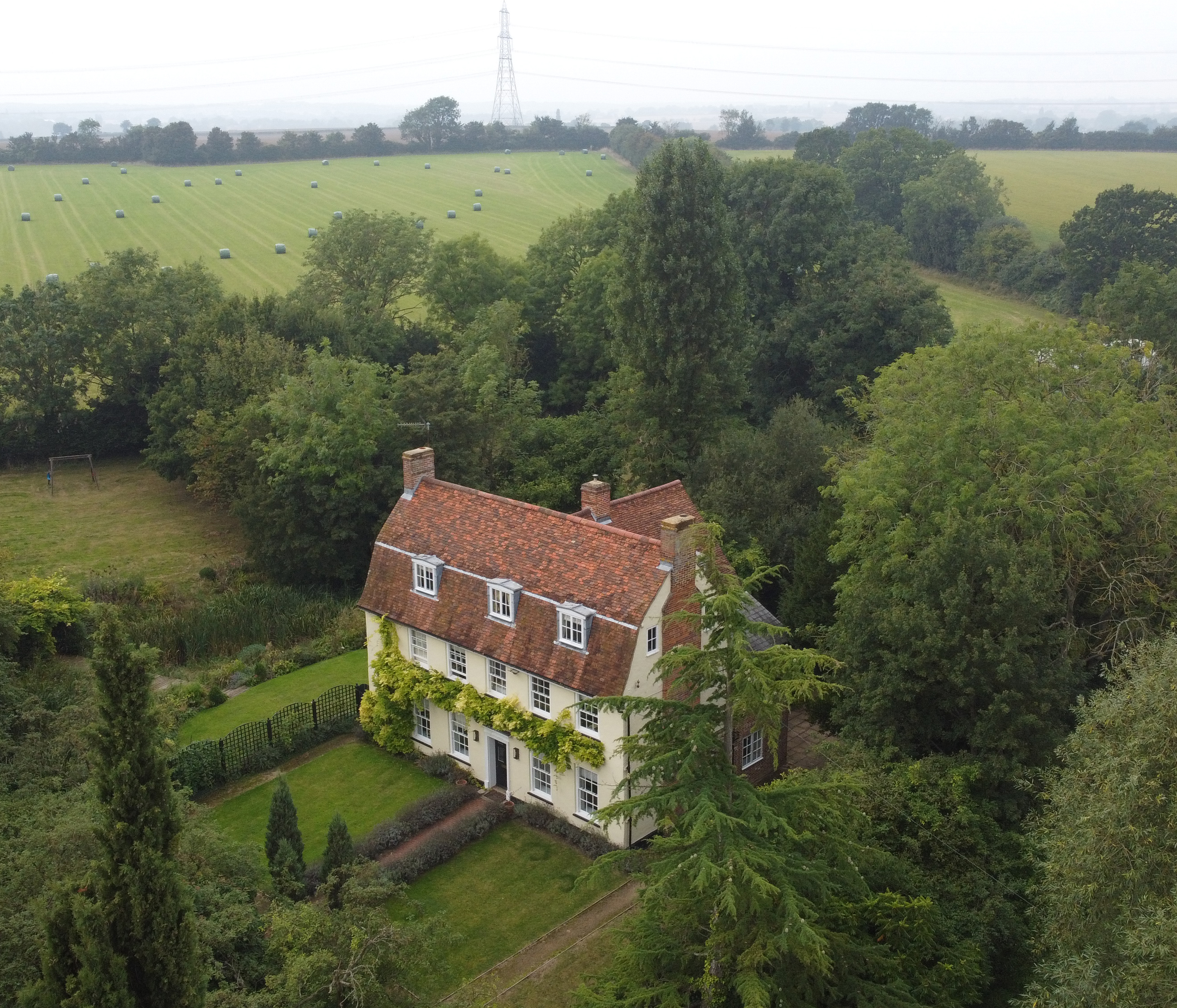
Moat House Farm, Clavering, Essex in 2021, aerial shot.

Subsequently, a series of young women were to suffer similar fates at the hands of Dougal: no sooner did they start work than Dougal was preying upon them. Within three months of his appointing Georgina "Kate" Cranwell as a servant, he had made her pregnant. She left six months later and gave birth in December 1902; Dougal evidently refused to provide for the child, so Kate sought an affiliation order on 27 January 1903. Information given to the court revealed that Camille Cecile Holland was not married to Dougal, resulting in some further enquiries being made about him. Initially, the enquiries centred on fraud and forgery until it became quite evident that Miss Holland was missing and had not been heard from by her relatives for over four years. Weeks of digging ensued at the Moat Farm until 27 April 1903 when Miss Holland's body was found. Following an inquest where it was discovered that Miss Holland had suffered a bullet wound to the head, Dougal was committed for trial on 22 June 1903.

== Conviction and execution ==
On 23 June, with the unanimous verdict of the jury, Dougal was found guilty of murder and sentenced to death by Mr Justice Wright. He was hanged by the public executioner William Billington at Chelmsford Prison on 14 July 1903.
