= Sarah Chesham =

Last woman executed for attempted murder in the United Kingdom (1809–1851)

- Born: 9 July 1809; Clavering, Essex, United Kingdom
- Died: 25 March 1851 (aged 41); Chelmsford, England, United Kingdom
- Other name: Sally Arsenic
- Status: Executed by hanging
- Conviction: Attempted murder
- Penalty: Death

Sarah Chesham (9 July 1809 – 25 March 1851) was the last woman to be executed for attempted murder in the United Kingdom. She was accused of having poisoned her husband and several children over her lifetime, with locals giving her the nickname Sally Arsenic.

== Biography ==
Chesham was born Sarah Parker at Clavering, near Saffron Walden in Essex, in July 1809. She married a farmer named Richard Chesham in 1828 and they had six sons together, which placed a severe strain on their finances.

In January 1845, two of the Chesham children, Joseph and James, became ill and soon died. Symptoms included vomiting and stomach pains. Many locals suspected that they had been poisoned, although the local doctor concluded that both had died from cholera. However, the following year Chesham came under suspicion after Solomon Taylor, the illegitimate son of a neighbour, suddenly died. He had been healthy when born before deteriorating rapidly sometime in June 1846. His mother Lydia Taylor claimed that he had fallen ill after being fed rice pudding and apple turnover by Sarah Chesham. The body was examined by leading toxicologist Alfred Swaine Taylor (no relation), who found no evidence of poisoning. The bodies of Joseph and James Chesham were then exhumed, and Taylor found fatal doses of arsenic in their stomachs.

Sarah Chesham was first tried for the murders of James and Joseph Chesham on 11 March 1847. Despite the expectations of most observers, she was acquitted by a jury after ten minutes of deliberation on the grounds that the prosecution had not proved that she had administered the poison (while arsenic and various other poisons were found in her home, no witnesses had actually seen her administer poison to either child). She was then tried for the murder of Solomon Taylor the following day but was once again acquitted, this time at the direction of the judge, on the grounds that it was never proved if the victim had been poisoned. The public strongly disagreed with the verdict, with The Times calling Chesham "an accepted and reputed murderess" and running sensationalist articles accusing her of offering her services as a poisoner to others for a fee. Other newspapers accused her neighbours of being complicit and criticised them for not reporting her to the authorities despite suspecting her of being a poisoner. Locals ostracised Chesham, who was met with cries of "Sally Arsenic!" in the street.

In May 1850, Richard Chesham died after a lengthy bout of tuberculosis. An autopsy found small traces of arsenic in his body, although the dose was not large enough to be fatal. During the illness, Sarah Chesham had constantly been by her husband's side and had fed him milk thickened with rice and flour, refusing to let anyone else feed him. Police arrested Sarah and continued to investigate even after a coroner's jury declined to charge her with murder, recovering a large sack of rice from which Sarah had fed her husband which was found to contain vast amounts of arsenic. Although arsenic is naturally occurring in rice, the sack recovered from her house contained enough to be visible to the naked eye.

Despite Richard's death, Sarah was only charged with attempted murder because there was not enough arsenic in his body to be fatal. It was instead argued that she had fed him small doses of arsenic throughout his period of illness in order to weaken his system until he was unable to continue fighting off the tuberculosis. A woman named Hannah Phillips also testified that Sarah had offered to poison her husband for her and had talked about her plans to poison her own husband. Sarah Chesham was found guilty of attempted murder and publicly hanged by William Calcraft on 25 May 1851.

=== Controversy ===
Since Sarah's execution, several observers have questioned the strength of the evidence against her and the fairness of her trial. John Campbell, 1st Baron Campbell, who presided over Sarah's final trial and sentenced her to death, was often criticised during his career for showing bias and attempting to influence juries, and had openly accused her of being a serial poisoner during the trial. Sarah did not have legal counsel and was not able to call her own witnesses. The jury may also have been influenced by the press, who in the years between Sarah's original trials and Richard's death had been vocal in their belief that she was guilty and regularly reminded readers of her case in other alleged poisoning cases.

A 2019 episode of the BBC show Murder, Mystery and My Family examined the case and suggested that the victims could have died of natural causes. The episode came to the conclusion that Sarah's conviction was unsafe.

In 2020, the Criminal Case Review Commission was asked to review whether Sarah Chesham should be granted a posthumous pardon. In 2022 the CCRC refused to grant a pardon, citing a lack of evidence to cast doubt on Sarah's guilt.
