= The Sweyne Park School =

Location
- Sir Walter Raleigh Drive; Rayleigh, Essex, SS6 9BZ; England; 51°35′44″N 0°35′55″E

Information
- Type: Academy
- Department for Education URN: 139534 Tables
- Ofsted: Reports
- Acting Headteacher: John Edwards
- Gender: Coeducational
- Age: 11 to 16 (18 from 2014)
- Enrolment: 1,288 pupils
- Website: www.sweynepark.com

The Sweyne Park School is a coeducational secondary school situated in Rayleigh, Essex, England, with specialised provision for hearing-impaired pupils. The school was formed in September 1997 following the amalgamation of Sweyne School and Park School. The Acting Headteacher is John Edwards, who took the position in September 2025, following Katherine Dines' retirement.

The school is an 11-18 academy (with a roll of 1,240 pupils), having opened a sixth form in September 2014. The sixth form has a maximum roll of 140 students, including 15 external students, who will be admitted in Year 12.

The school was judged Good by Ofsted in 2025.

== Awards ==
The school has achieved a number of awards since it opened. The following awards have been awarded or re-accredited since 2010:

- International School Award
- Investors in People Gold Award
- Rights Respecting School Gold Award
