= Dutch Cottage =

Coordinates: 51.587011°N 0.602294°E

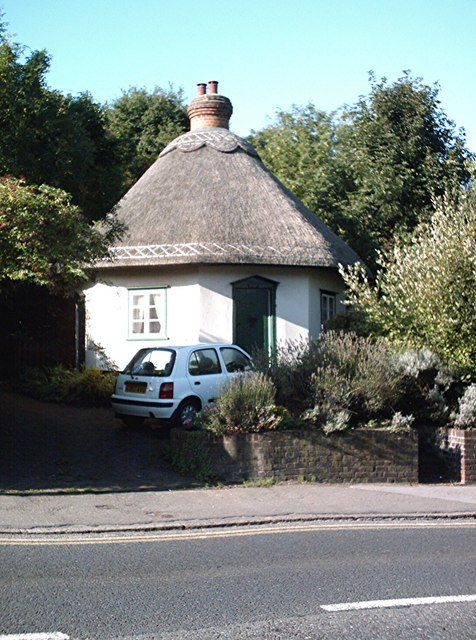
Essex

== History ==
The cottage's history is the subject of dispute. Above the front door is an inscription which reads "1621", suggesting its year of construction. Nevertheless, surveyors, architects and historians who have studied the cottage have opined that it was not built until the eighteenth century, more specifically around 1740. It takes its name from the association of this type of house with the seventeenth-century Dutch immigrants who constructed many of the sea walls of the south Essex coast. The house is of similar construction to those at Castle Point nearby.

The unusual octagonal structure is said to serve several functions. It is strong, relatively easy to thatch, and provides the occupants with a more panoramic view. Also, for the superstitious, the lack of right angles prevented evil spirits from lurking in wait around a corner. The house was in private ownership until 1964. It was purchased by the local council in 1965.

Owners Rochford District Council opened the cottage to residential tenant applicants in 2008 for £75 per week in rent, on condition that they would make the property available for pre-arranged guided tours every Wednesday afternoon. In 2017 a heritage plaque was installed.

== Architecture ==
The octagonal building has a timber frame on a brick plinth. It is approximately 20 feet (6.1 m) wide. It has one storey, a bedroom in the attic which is beneath the thatched roof, and a circular brick chimney.
