= Rayleigh Town Museum =

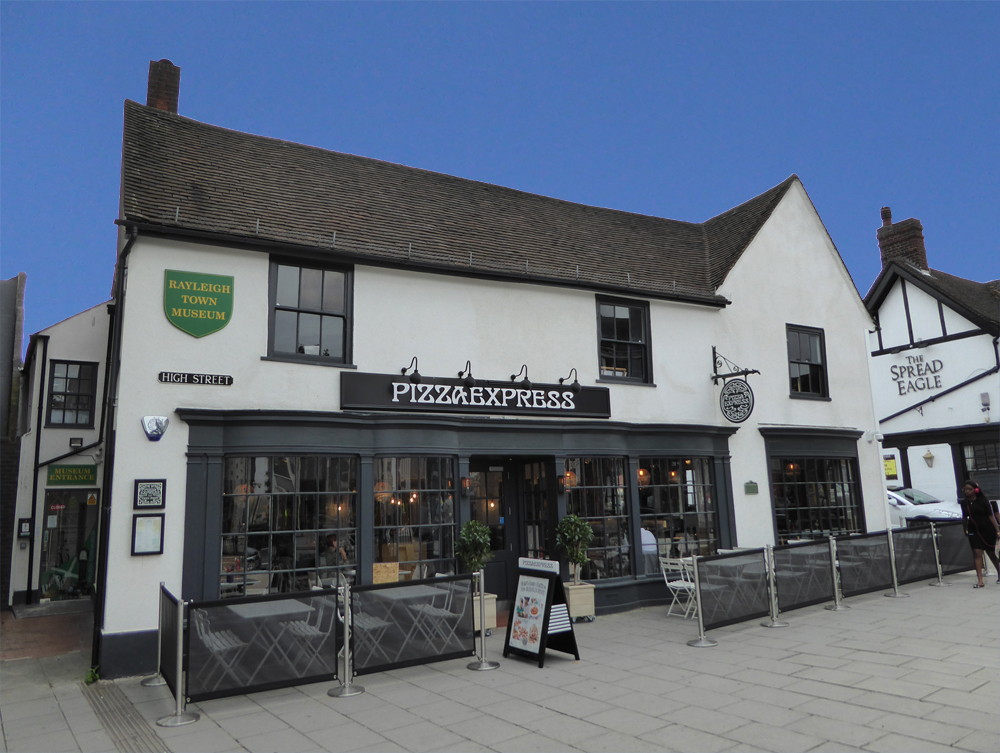
- Rayleigh Town Museum sits above a Pizza Restaurant
- Established: 9 April 2016
- Location: 91 High Street, Rayleigh, England
- Coordinates: 51.5858329°N 0.6052408°E
- Type: Local museum
- Website: www.rayleightownmuseum.co.uk

The Rayleigh Town Museum is a small local museum on the top floor at 91 High Street, Rayleigh. It is run by a registered charity. The building is a Grade II listed building which is a former timber-framed house dating from at least the 16th century. The museum received funding of £89,800 in March 2015 from the Heritage Lottery Fund for its "inception, development and sustainability." It was officially opened by the local MP, Mark Francois, on 9 April 2016.
