= Clavering, Essex =

Village in Essex, England

Coordinates: 51.965°N 0.145°E

Clavering
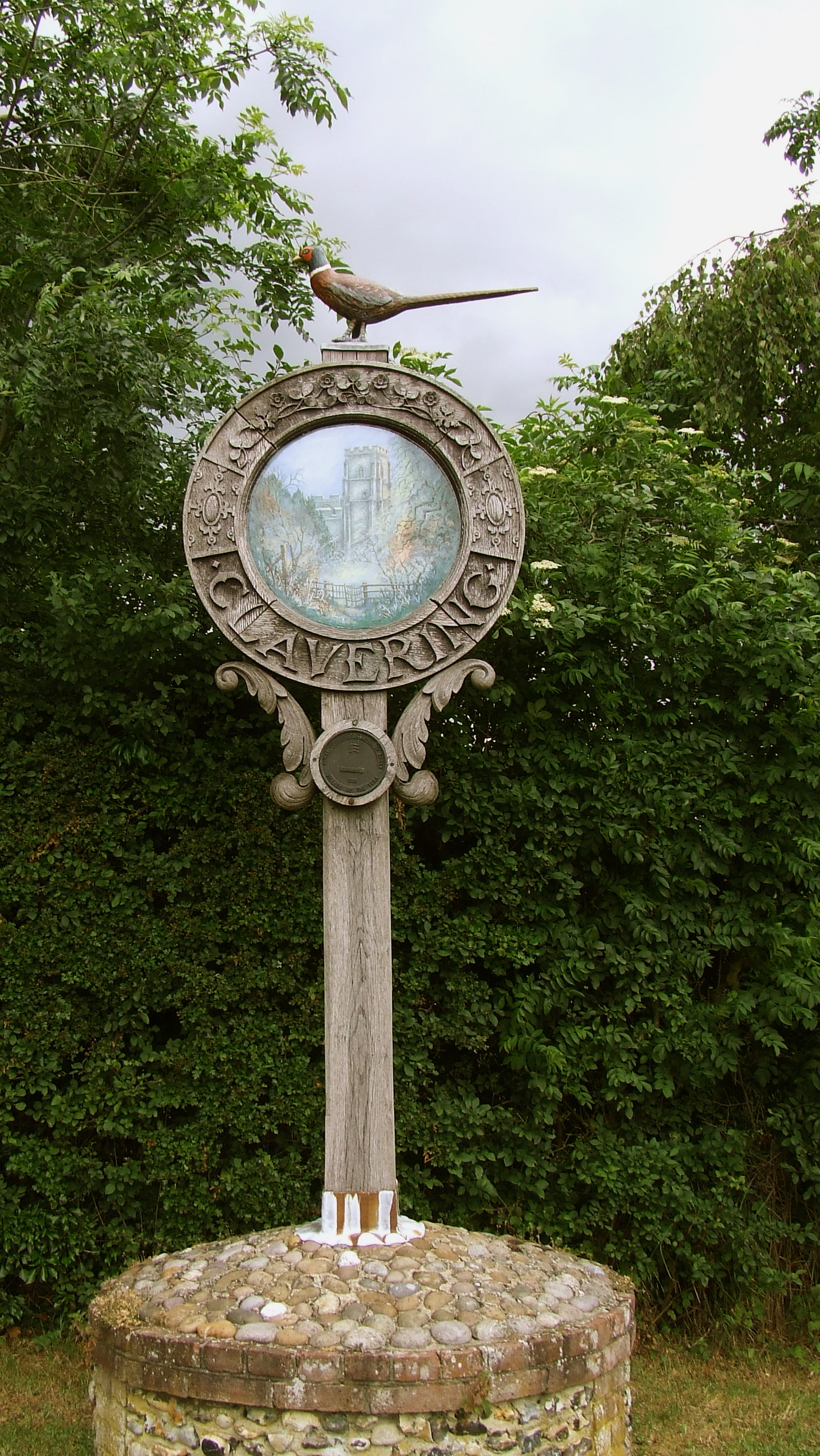
- Clavering village sign

- Location within Essex
- Population: 1,345 (Parish, 2021)
- OS grid reference: TL473318
- Civil parish: Clavering
- District: Uttlesford
- Shire county: Essex
- Region: East
- Country: England
- Sovereign state: United Kingdom
- Post town: SAFFRON WALDEN
- Postcode district: CB11
- Dialling code: 01799
- Police: Essex
- Fire: Essex
- Ambulance: East of England
- UK Parliament: North West Essex
- Website: Parish Council

Clavering is a village and civil parish in the Uttlesford district, in north-west Essex in England. It lies 6 miles (10 km) south-west of Saffron Walden, its post town, and 20 miles (32 km) south of Cambridge. The name 'Clavering' means 'place where clover grows'. At the 2021 census the parish had a population of 1,345.

== Location and local area ==
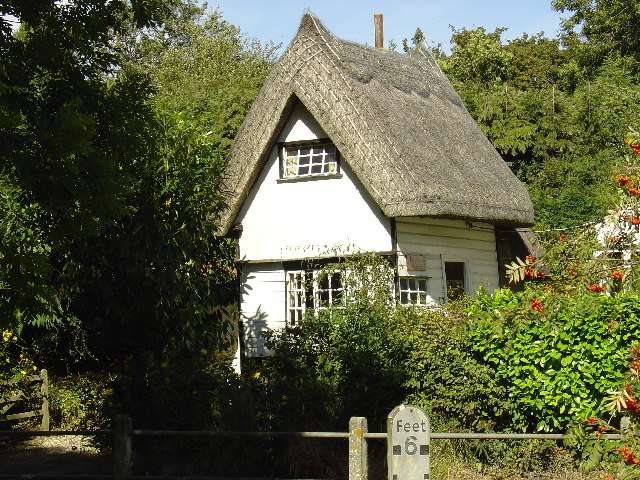
Fordkeeper's cottage in Clavering

Clavering lies 20 miles (32 km) south of Cambridge on the River Stort, close to the border with Hertfordshire. It is one of over 100 villages in the district of Uttlesford. Local towns are Saffron Walden, which is just over six miles north-east of the village, and Bishop's Stortford, eight miles to the south. The closest railway stations are Newport and Audley End. Clavering is 10 miles from Stansted Airport.

Today, Clavering is a large scattered village that encompasses seven 'greens' and three 'ends', namely: Hill Green, Stickling Green, Starling's Green, Roast Green, Sheepcote Green, Birds Green, Deer's Green, Mill End, Ford End and Further Ford End. It retains many old timber-framed and thatched buildings. The oldest remaining parts of medieval Clavering's village centre are around Church End and Middle Street, close to the church and the river.

== Village amenities ==
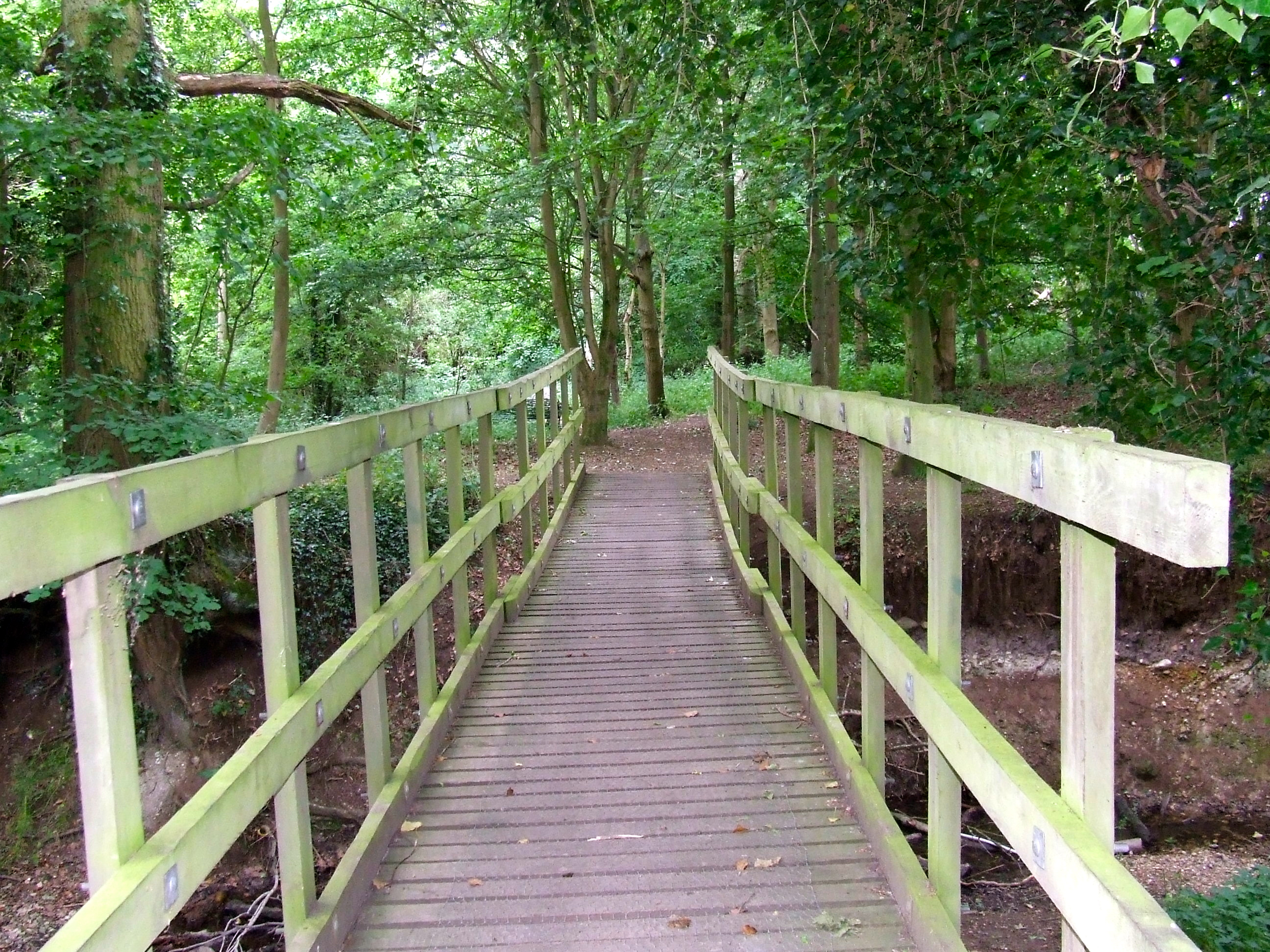
Footbridge leading into Simon's Wood

The village has a large playing field, Jubilee Field, with bowls and tennis facilities and a children's play area. The adjoining Simon's Wood provides access to many countryside walks. The area has several accessible fishing lakes, which attract anglers. These include Clavering Lakes, a series of five purpose-built lakes created in 1991. Clavering has a primary school and large village shop with the post office being on Stortford Road, and there is a long-established garden centre/nursery on Hill Green called FW Whyman.

Village clubs and societies include Clavering Players, an amateur drama company that began life in 1945 as Cheerio's Concert Party. Clavering Cricket Club plays on Hill Green and has done so since the turn of the 20th century. The pavilion was built in 1950 and features seating from Lord's, the home of English cricket.

Chef and TV presenter Jamie Oliver comes from Clavering, and lived there until he sold his property to Daisy Ridley in 2019. Jamie's parents Trevor and Sally ran one of the two village pubs, The Cricketers, from the 1970s until 2021. The Fox and Hounds is at the other end of the village, opposite the River Stort. Both pubs attract people from nearby villages such as Arkesden, Wicken Bonhunt and Langley Upper Green, as well as Clavering residents.

== History ==
The Domesday Book recorded there were 17 villagers. 37 smallholders and 12 slaves in the village.

== Places of historic interest ==
Notable sites in Clavering include Clavering Castle and the former Clavering guildhall, now known as The Bury. The remains of the castle are now just ringworks and earthworks. The castle is believed to date from pre-Norman times. The former guildhall is a medieval Grade II* listed building. Constructed in the early 14th century, it was restored following a fire in 1991.

The parish Church of St Mary & St Clement is largely 15th-century but contains some evidence of a pre-medieval church that stood on the site. Notable objects include the carved Elizabethan pulpit and stained glass. There is a memorial in the church to Mary Wales, whose brother Charles Green and husband William Wales sailed on Captain James Cook's first and second voyages.

Two other church buildings stand in Clavering. There is a brick built Primitive Methodist chapel (now a private home), dating from 1877 to 1878, on Hill Green. Clavering Christian Centre, now an ecumenical church/community centre, is on Stortford Road in a building that originally housed a Congregational church.

== The Moat Farm murder and 'Sally Arsenic' ==
Two notorious murder cases are part of the village's history. The Moat Farm Murder in 1903 attracted scores of sightseers after the body of Camille Cecile Holland was dug up in the grounds of Moat Farm, the place of residence she had acquired whilst presenting herself as the wife of Samuel Herbert Dougal. Dougal was married to another woman by the name of Sarah (née Sarah Henrietta White) who, once Miss Holland had been disposed of, took up residence at the Moat Farm, pretending, initially at least, to be Dougal's daughter. This pretence nevertheless was soon dropped when she started wearing clothes known to have been the property of Miss Holland. Samuel Herbert Dougal was hanged for the crime yet Sarah escaped all scrutiny and disappeared from all records from that time onward.

Some 50 years earlier, Sarah Chesham (known locally as 'Sally Arsenic') was hanged for the attempted murder of her husband. Previously she had been tried and acquitted for the murder of her two sons and the illegitimate son of a neighbour, and this "bad character" led to the police and coroner disregarding the initial inquest's findings that there was insufficient evidence to bring the case to trial. Unlike the previous three trials, Sarah did not have legal counsel in this final trial and was left to defend herself from the dubious account put forward by an old friend she had fallen out with, the assertions of a well respected expert, who himself had admitted in a letter that the amount of arsenic present in Richard's body was not enough to bring a case to trial, and a jury influenced by sensationalised media coverage that had persisted since the original three trials. Unsurprisingly, the illiterate wife of a farm labourer was unable to convince the jury of her innocence. However, in 2019 the conviction was deemed unsafe by the BBC TV programme Murder, Mystery and My Family, during which, the barrister acting for the prosecution advised the judge that Sarah should not have been found guilty.

This case influenced a change in the law on selling arsenic, requiring vendors to make a note of the purchaser's name, address and reason for needing poison.

== Governance ==
An electoral ward in the same name exists. This ward had a population of 1,461 at the 2011 Census.

Clavering parish is within the local government district of Uttlesford and the North West Essex Parliamentary constituency.

== Notable people ==
- Jamie Oliver, celebrity chef, was born and raised in Clavering
- Sarah Chesham, alleged poisoner (see above), was born in Clavering

== Gallery ==
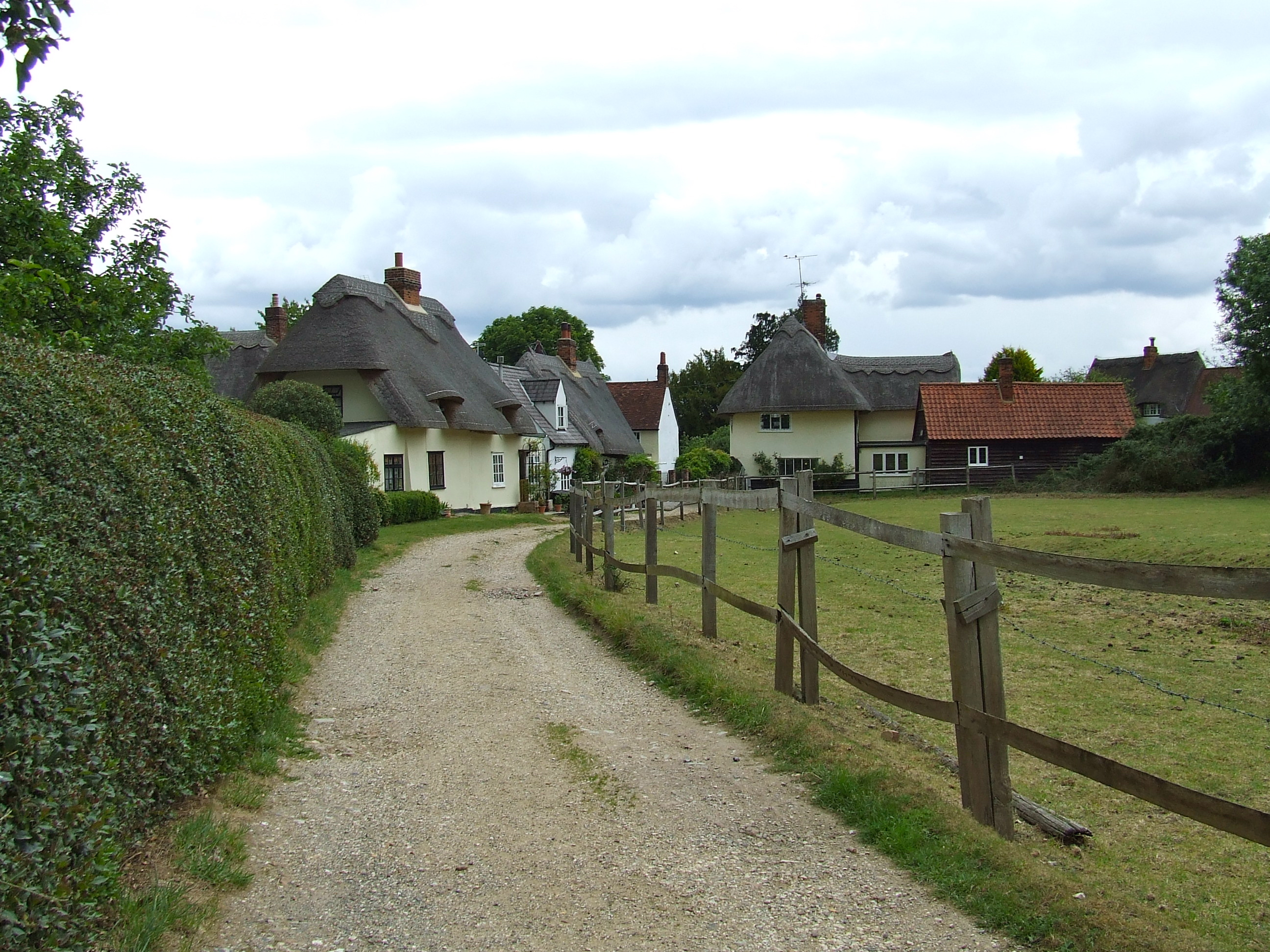
View from The Bury down the church drive towards Middle Street

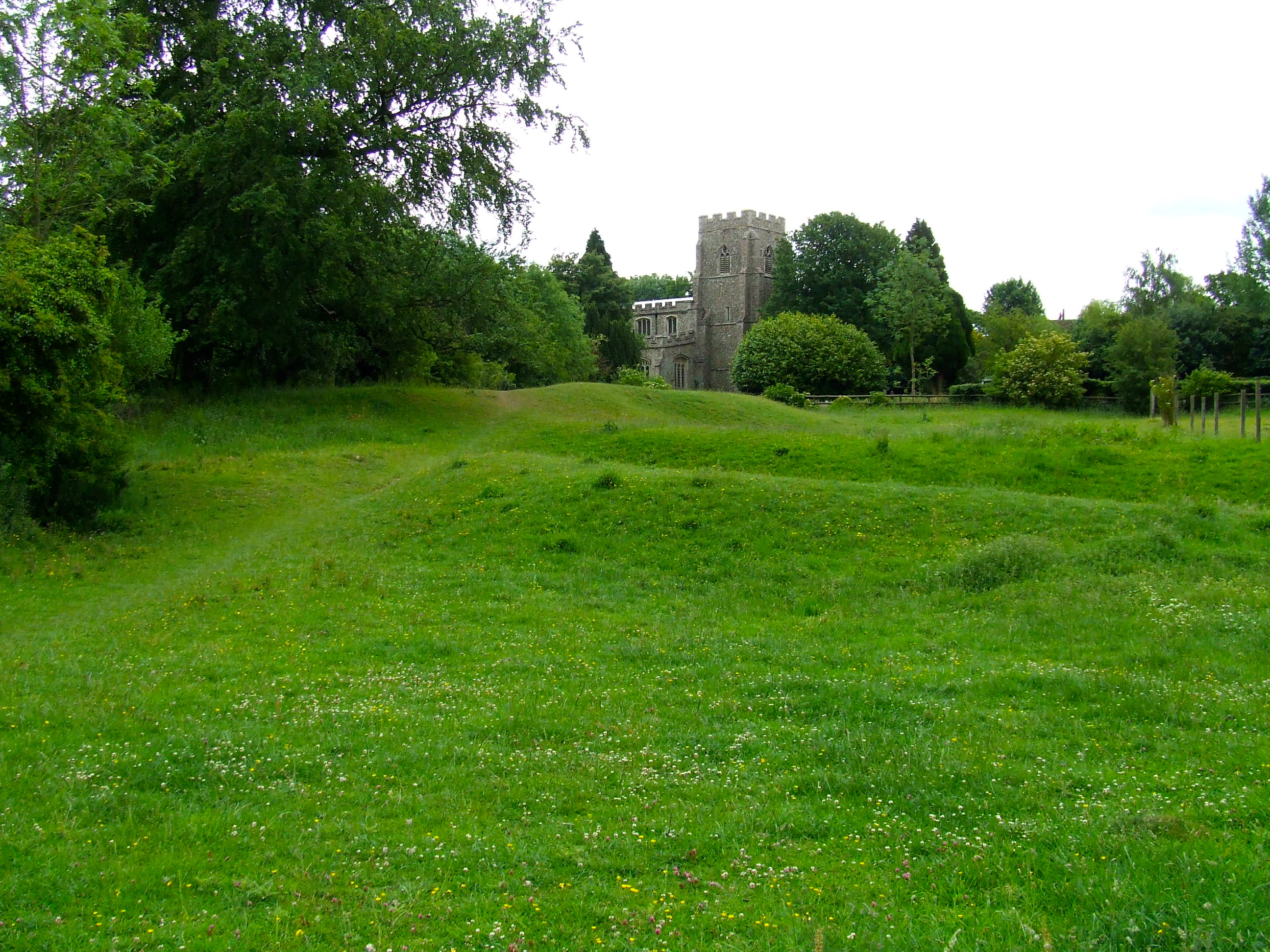
St Mary & St Clement Church viewed from the site of Clavering Castle

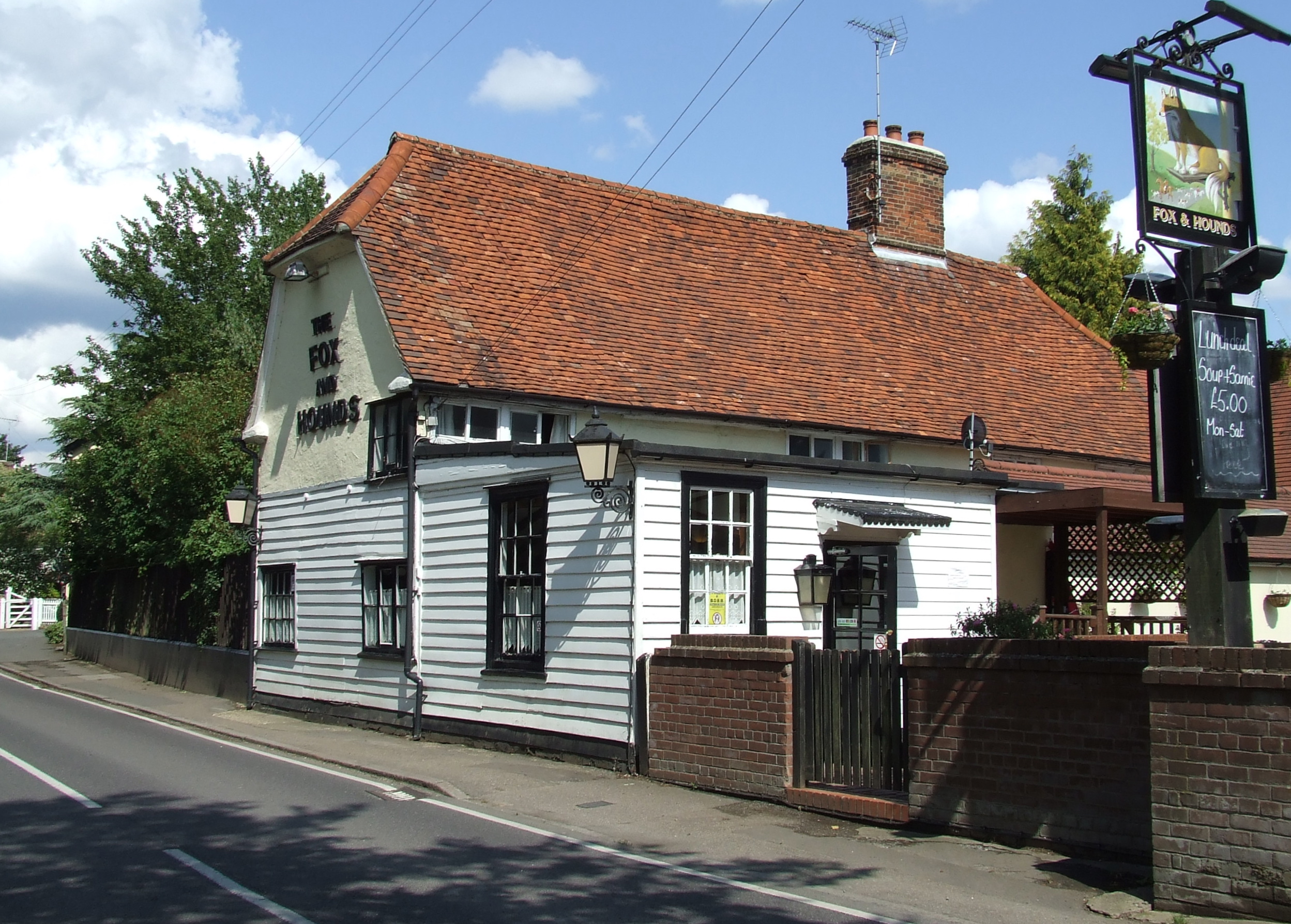
'Fox and Hounds' pub, viewed from High Street, Clavering

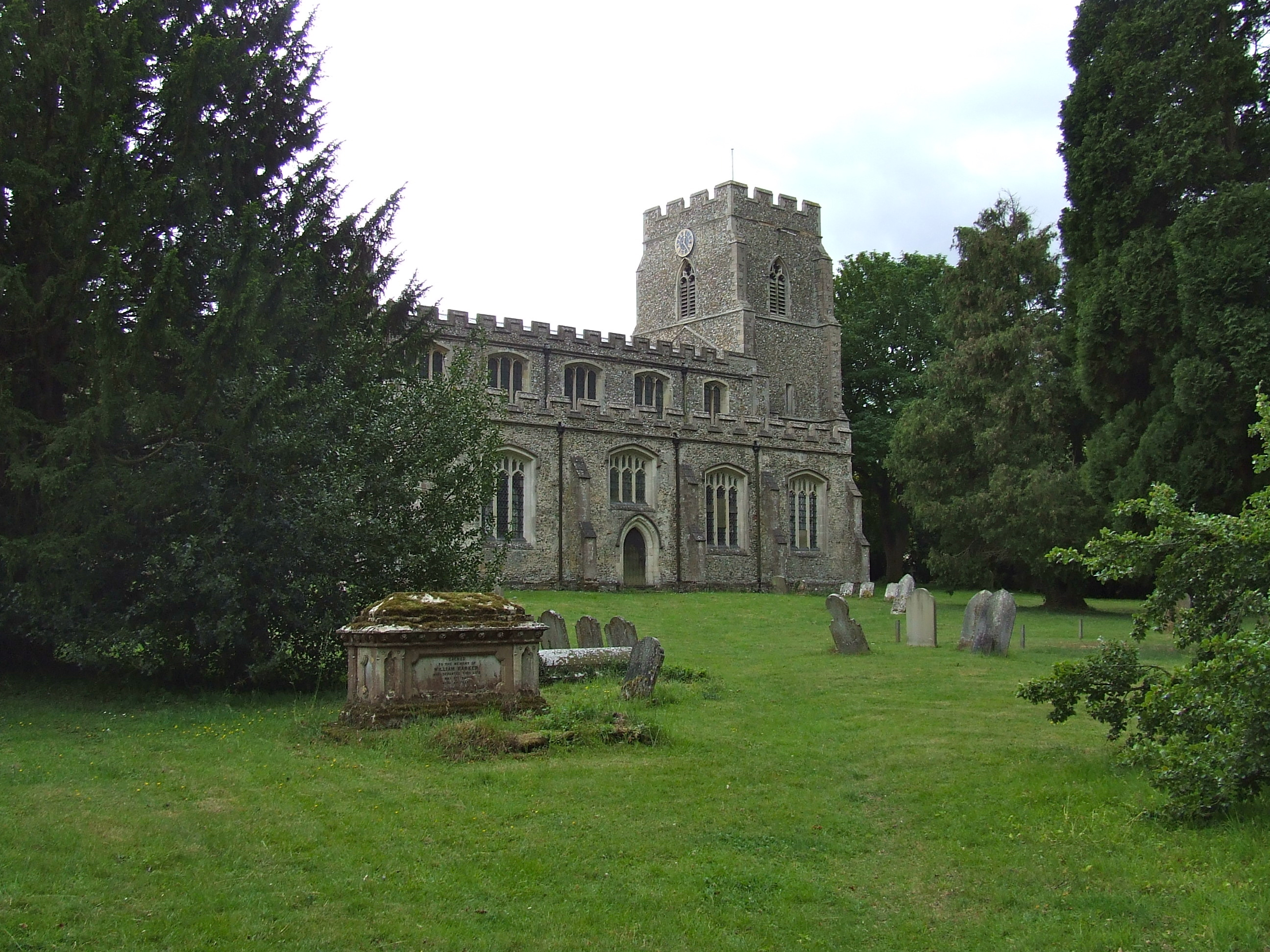
St Mary & St Clement Church

== See also ==
- Clavering hundred
- The Hundred Parishes
