= Rayleigh, Essex =

Town in Essex, England

Coordinates: 51.5864°N 0.6049°E

Rayleigh
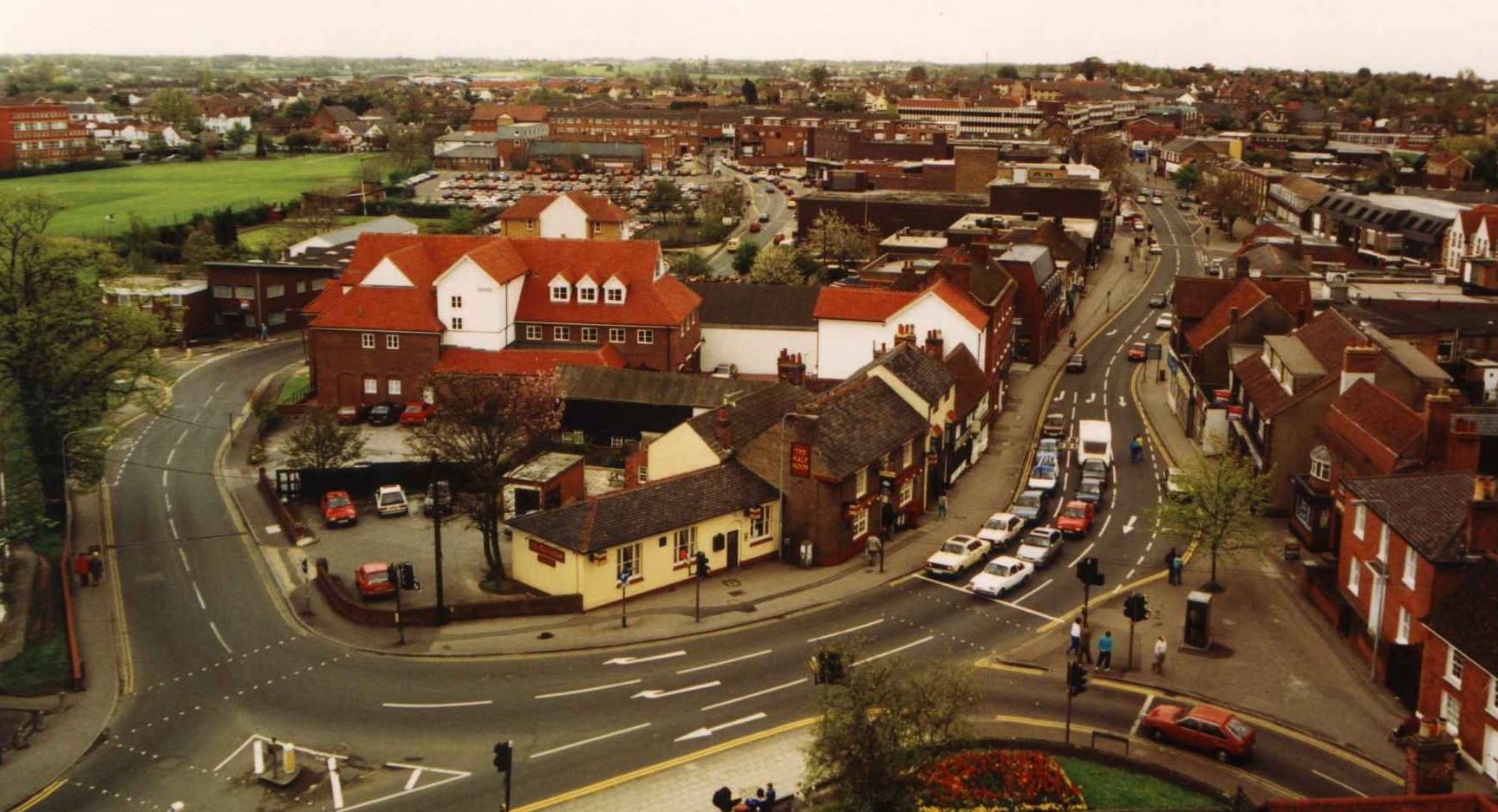
- The High Street, as seen from the top of Holy Trinity Church

- Location within Essex
- Population: 32,248 (parish, 2021); (Note: To get individual parish data, use the query function on table PP002.); 32,380 (built-up area, 2021)
- OS grid reference: TQ805907
- Civil parish: Rayleigh
- District: Rochford
- Shire county: Essex
- Region: East
- Country: England
- Sovereign state: United Kingdom
- Post town: RAYLEIGH
- Postcode district: SS6
- Dialling code: 01268
- Police: Essex
- Fire: Essex
- Ambulance: East of England
- UK Parliament: Rayleigh and Wickford

Rayleigh /ˈreɪliː/ is a market town and civil parish in the Rochford District, Essex, England. It lies between Chelmsford and Southend-on-Sea, 32 miles (51 km) east of central London. At the 2021 census, the parish had a population of 32,248 and the built-up area had 32,380.

== Toponymy ==
The name Rayleigh is Old English in origin deriving from rǣge ('female roe-deer or she-goat') and lēah ('clearing'). Therefore, the name means overall 'wood or clearing of the wild she-goats or roe-deer".

== History ==
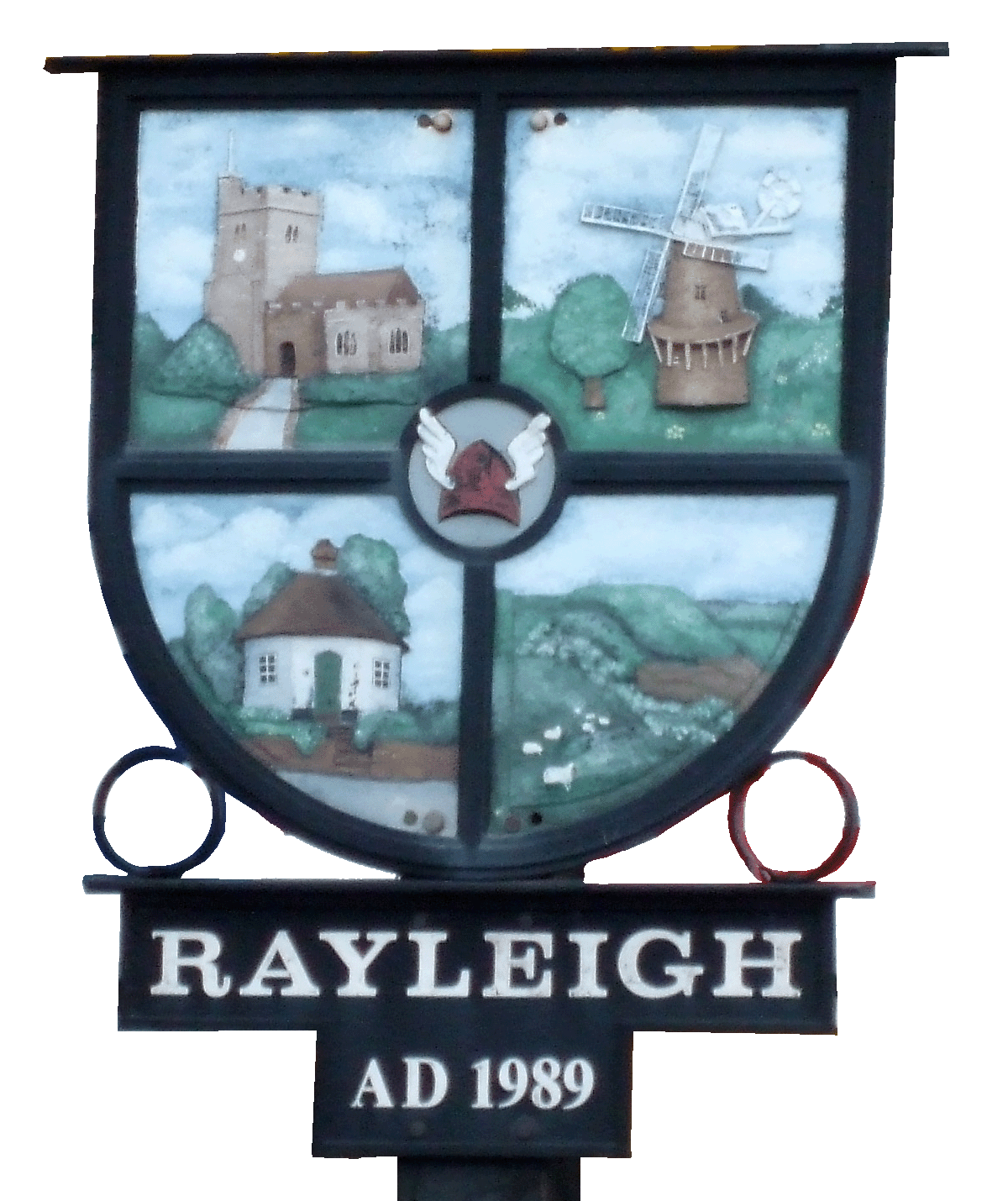
Rayleigh sign, showing Holy Trinity Church, Rayleigh Windmill, Rayleigh Castle mount and the Dutch Cottage

=== Prehistoric and Roman times ===
There has been a scattering of stray finds around the town from Prehistoric and Roman times, including some Roman roof and hypocaust tiles found within the fabric of Rayleigh Church. This suggests that there was a Roman habitation site within the area. However, there is little evidence of any density of population here during this period.

=== Saxon era ===
One significant archaeological find was in the early 2000s at the western edge of Rayleigh, at the site of the former Park School in Rawreth Lane. An early Saxon cemetery site was discovered here, with 144 cremation burials and evidence of just one high-status female inhumation burial.

By the end of the Saxon period, there was village here, as it is recorded in the Domesday Book of 1086 when it was held by Swein of Essex, the son of Robert FitzWimarc.

The most significant historic monument is the great medieval mound of Rayleigh Castle. This was an early Norman motte and bailey castle, of which only the motte and its surrounding embankments remain. Despite the loss of its timber superstructure and later stone buildings, its height and bulk mean that it still dominates the town centre.

=== Later medieval period (1154–1485) ===
A courthouse was erected in Rayleigh in 1338. This was apparently resented by the townspeople, who turned out in force to destroy it, with 20 ringleaders later arrested and tried.

The forests around the town were royal hunting grounds. It is recorded that King Henry III hunted here in 1222 and three King Edwards also visited.

One of the oldest secular buildings is 91 High Street, which houses Rayleigh Town Museum upstairs. The Regal Room in the museum is dated circa 1350. It is suspected that some of Rayleigh's older brick built buildings may contain portions older than this.

Rayleigh Castle gradually fell into disuse and, in 1394, King Richard II gave permission for the townspeople of Rayleigh to use the foundations as a source of stone. By this time, the site was in royal ownership and used for pasture:

"...know all men of special grace who have the will to repair certain Chapel in the said town and to build a new a certain belfry we have granted them the foundations and to take away and use any stones found therein."

=== Tudors and Stuarts ===
Records indicate that the church was rich in plate, vestments and stained glass, but these were disposed of:

"No church within the hundred was more splendidly adorned; none were so richly furnished with plate, vestments and other accessories for the celebration of the divine service; none were so rich in painted glass; none have been more mercilessly despoiled"

During Henry VIII's reign, deer were constantly taken from here to replenish the herds in Greenwich Park.

=== Modern ===
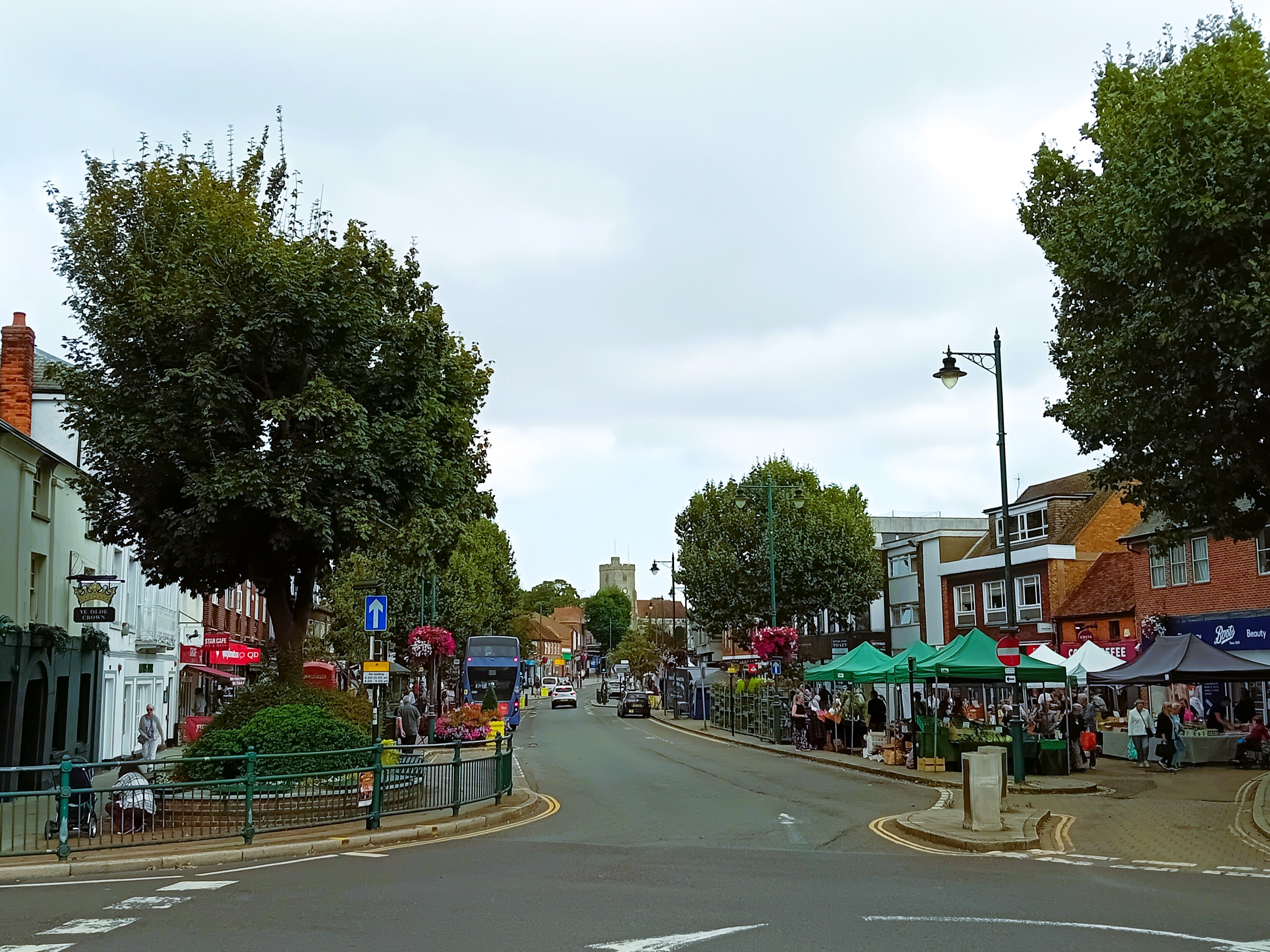
High Street, looking towards Holy Trinity Church

During the 1990s, many new housing estates appeared on formerly greenfield areas of the town, with the East of England region currently pushing for more homes to be built in the area. This has caused some controversy locally, with residents of Rayleigh feeling that the areas surrounding the town should be preserved with more care.

== Governance ==
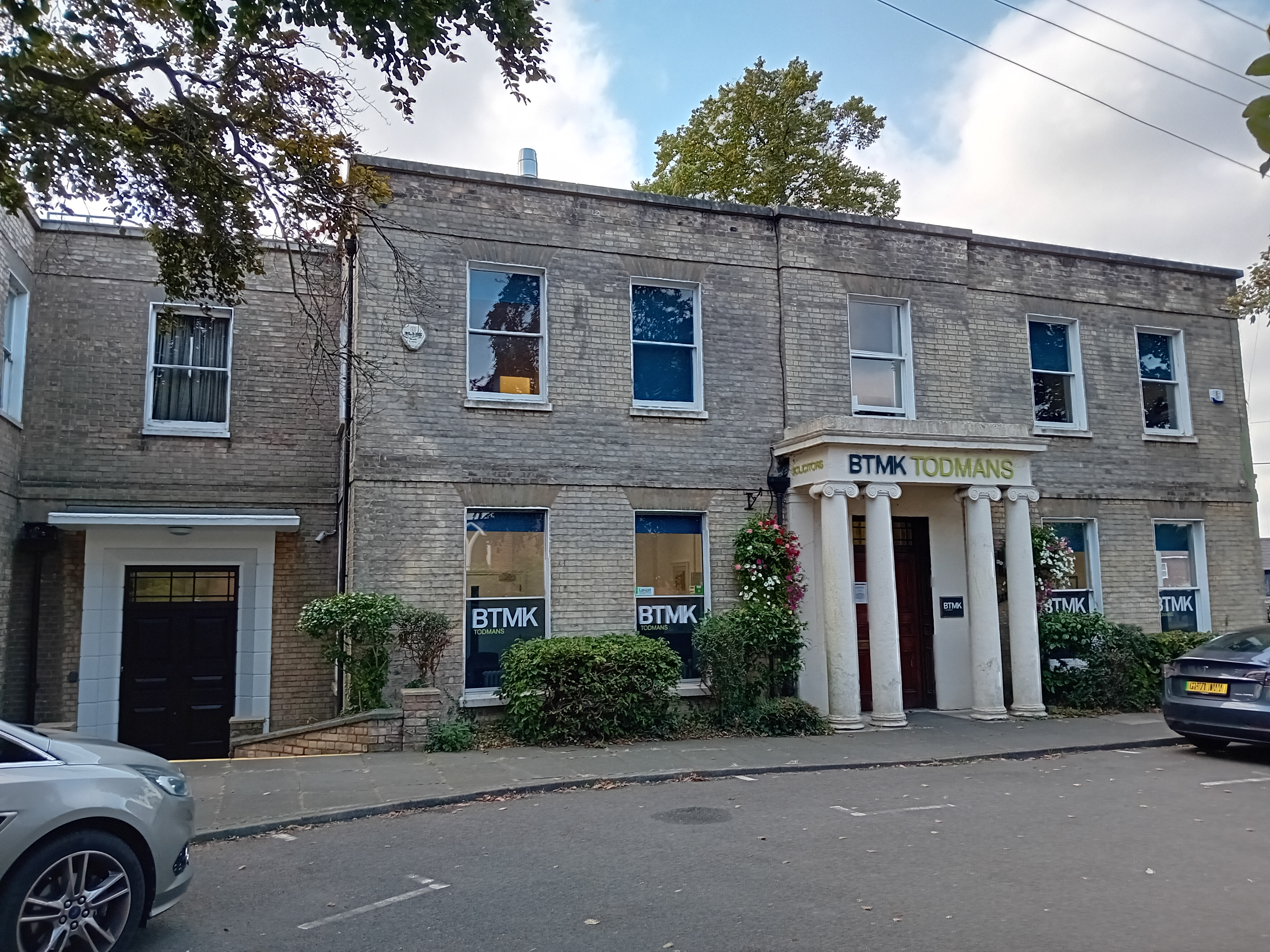
Barringtons, Hockley Road: Former headquarters of Rayleigh Urban District Council, now solicitors' offices

There are three tiers of local government covering Rayleigh, at parish (town), district and county level: Rayleigh Town Council, Rochford District Council and Essex County Council. The town council is based at the pavilion at the King George V Playing Field off Bull Lane. Rochford District Council holds its meetings in Rayleigh, at the Civic Suite at 2 Hockley Road.

For national elections, Rayleigh forms part of the Rayleigh and Wickford constituency, represented by Mark Francois of the Conservative Party.

=== Administrative history ===
Rayleigh was an ancient parish in the Rochford Hundred of Essex. When elected parish and district councils were created in the town was given a parish council and included in the Rochford Rural District. In 1929, Rayleigh and neighbouring Rawreth were removed from the rural district to become an urban district called Rayleigh.

The urban district council was initially based at offices at 28 High Street. The council moved to a converted mid-19th century house called Barringtons on Hockley Road in 1953.

Rayleigh Urban District was abolished in 1974, when the area became part of the new Rochford district. Rochford District Council retained the civic suite wing of Barringtons, which had been built as an extension in 1964, but the older part of the building is now solicitors' offices. As part of the 1974 reforms, the former Rayleigh Urban District became unparished. A new parish of Rawreth was subsequently created covering part of the former urban district in 1994, followed by a new parish called Rayleigh covering the remainder in 1996. The parish council adopted the name of Rayleigh Town Council.

== Education ==
Rayleigh has two secondary schools: The Sweyne Park School, formed by the amalgamation of the Sweyne and Park schools, and FitzWimarc School.

It also has seven primary schools: Down Hall, Edward Francis, Grove Wood, Our Lady of Ransom (Catholic), Rayleigh Primary and Wyburns. The seventh, Glebe Primary School with UHI, was created in September 2014 through the amalgamation of Glebe Infant and Nursery School and Glebe Junior School. In addition, St Nicholas C of E Primary School, a long-established school for the adjoining village of Rawreth, moved in 2006 to a new building just on the Rayleigh side of the parish boundary.

There are also two cadet units: Rayleigh Detachment Essex ACF and 1476 (Rayleigh) Squadron RAFAC.

== Transport ==
Rayleigh railway station is a stop on the Shenfield-Southend line. Greater Anglia operates services between Southend Victoria and London Liverpool Street, via Shenfield. Three trains per hour run during the day in each direction; on Sundays, this reduces to two per hour.

Bus services are operated predominately by Arriva Southend and First Essex. Arriva's services focus on local routes, whereas First Essex's routes generally travel further afield. Services connect the town with Basildon, Chelmsford, Southend, Rochford, Hockley and Stansted Airport.

== Market ==
There is a small outdoor market on Wednesdays. Until 2011, it was located next to Rayleigh Civic Suite and Information Centre, opposite Holy Trinity Church; it then moved to the taxi rank in the town's High Street, outside Boots.

The market dates back to before 1181, when it was inscribed in the Exchequer Records of Henry II.

== Historic buildings ==
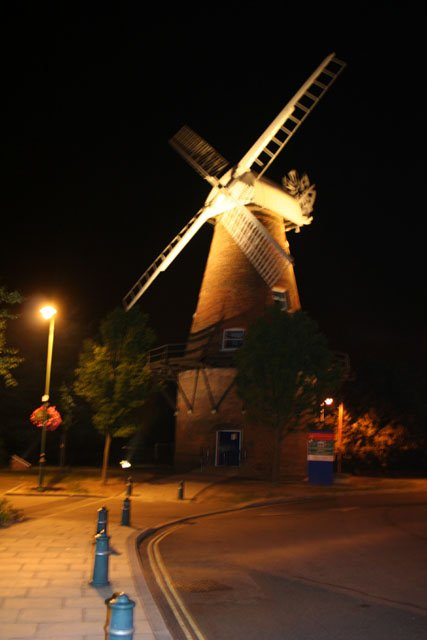
Rayleigh Windmill

The Dutch Cottage, the smallest and oldest council house in the United Kingdom, can be visited on Wednesdays by prior appointment.

Rayleigh Windmill was renovated in 2010, including a structural renovation of the 19th century brick-built building. The basic external brickwork has been repaired and the interior has been transformed to provide four storeys of modern display facilities which has turned the windmill into a major tourist and educational attraction in the county. The changes to the windmill allow the public to view the interior and to exploit this local historic amenity for cultural, educational and tourism use.

Rayleigh Mount, a National Trust property adjacent to the windmill, is the site of a Domesday castle erected by Sweyn of Essex with distinctive motte-and-bailey defences. Edward Belcham Francis gave the Mount to the trust in 1923. From its summit, it offers sweeping views across the Crouch Valley.

=== Rayleigh Town Museum ===
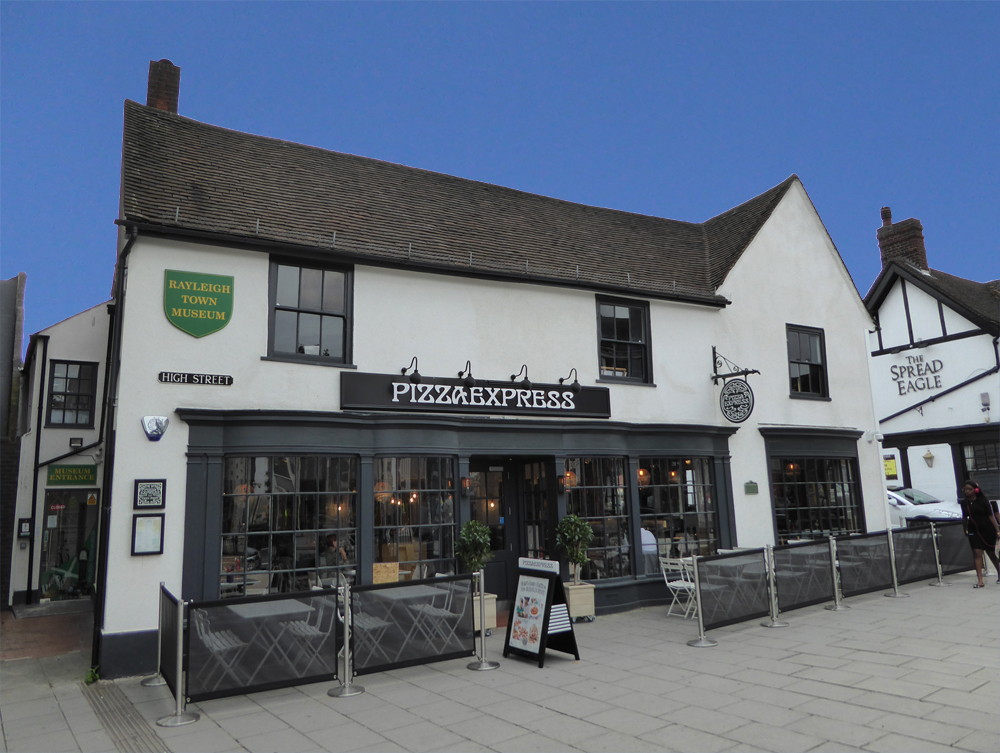
91 High Street

Rayleigh Town Museum occupies the first floor of 91 High Street and contains many artefacts telling the history of the town.

== Religion ==
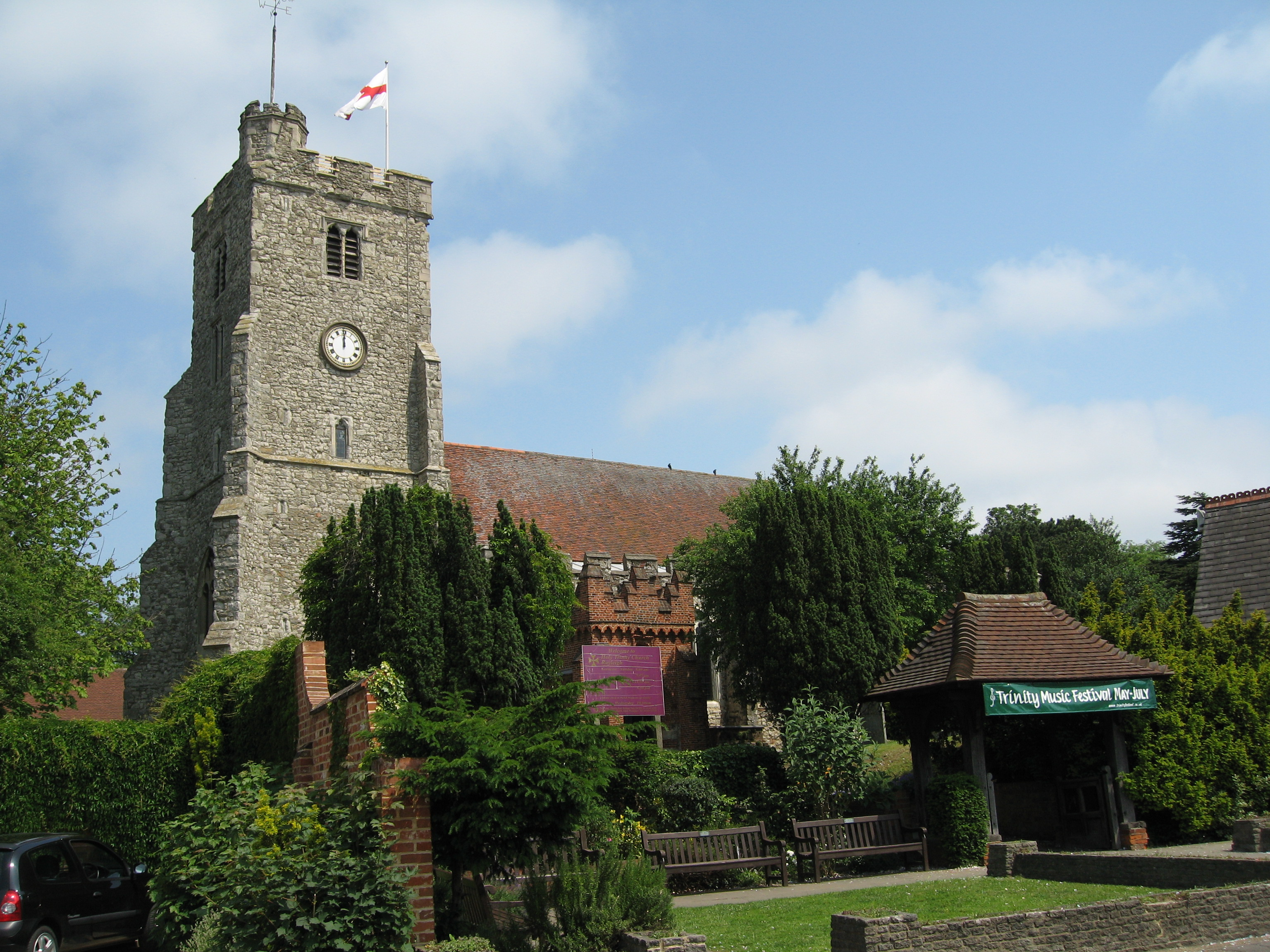
Holy Trinity parish church

The Church of England parish church of the Holy Trinity is sited at the top of the High Street. A church existed on the site in Saxon times and the present building has a Norman chancel. The bell tower was built in the 15th century and includes stone taken from the castle when that fell into disuse. The church has an impressive Tudor brick porch. The Gothic Revival architect, C.C. Rolfe, restored the chancel in 1873.

The parish church of Saint Michael and All Angels is in Sir Walter Raleigh Drive, near Sweyne School. It was built in the 1950s, when Rayleigh expanded considerably. It has a multi-purpose building which is used by other local groups as well as the church.

Our Lady of Ransom Catholic Church is on London Hill.

The United Reformed Church is on Crown Hill.

The Baptist Church is sited in the High Street. The building opened for worship on 25 March 1799, shortly before the first Pastor, Rev James Pilkington, was inducted in June 1799. In June 1979, work started on a church extension. This added significantly more seating and completed some much needed repairs.

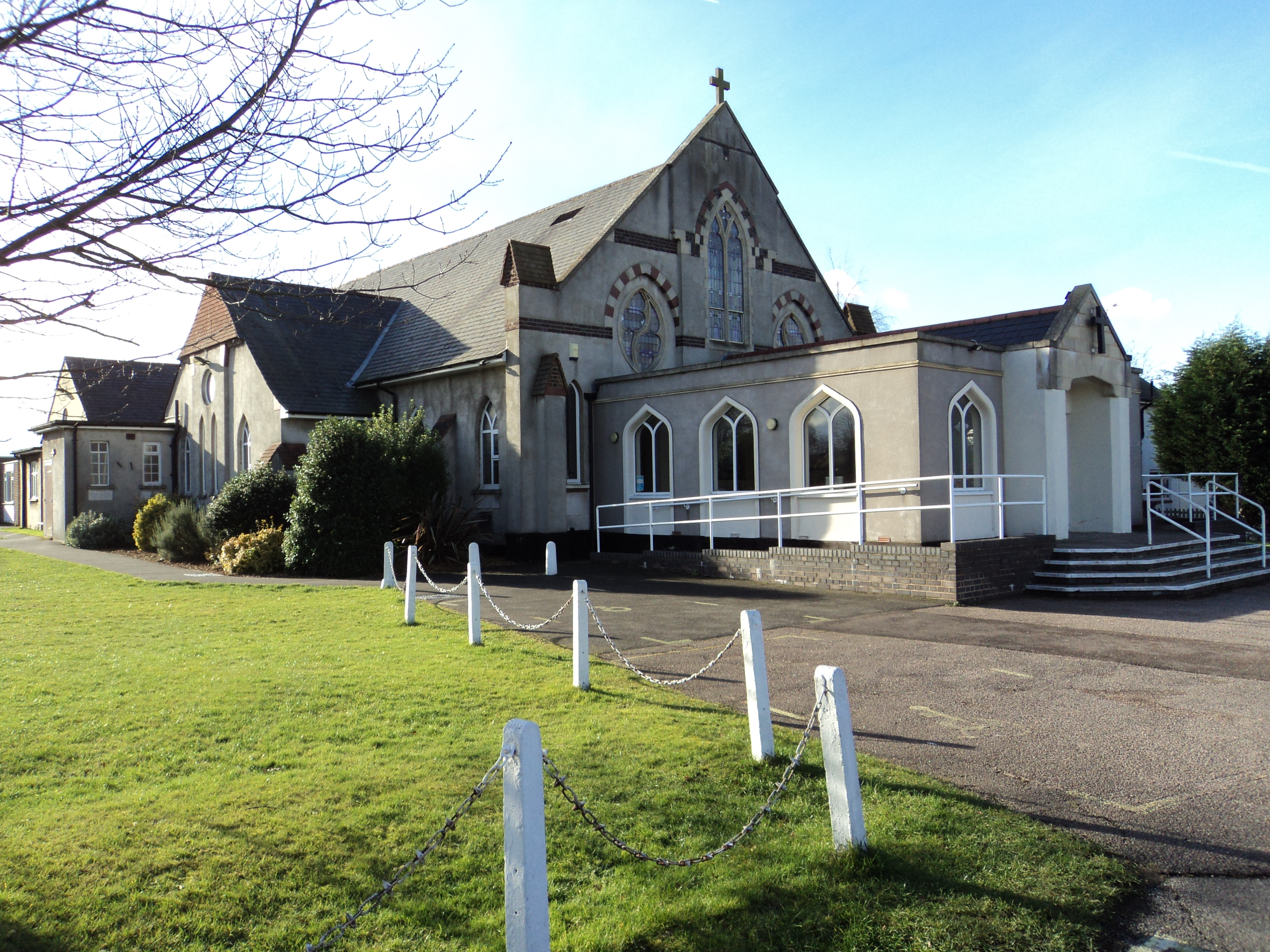
Rayleigh Methodist Church

The Methodist Church is on Eastwood Road, having moved from the High Street in 1934.

Grange Free Church is on London Road, at the junction with Langdon Road.

The Salvation Army are located on the corner of the High Street and Love Lane. The building was the original 1884 Methodist Church, which was sold to the Salvation Army in 1934, when the Methodist Church moved to a larger site in Eastwood Road.

== Sport and recreation ==
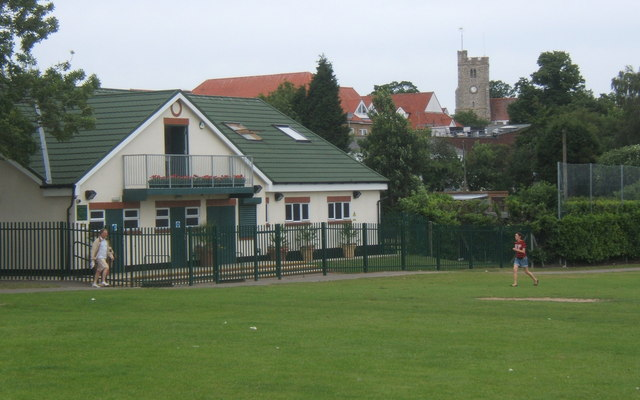
King George V Playing Field, with the pavilion to the left

The town has a golf club on its outskirts: Rayleigh Golf Club (previously the Lords Golf & Country Club), which is situated on Hullbridge Road. This was originally opened in 1991 as Hanover Golf Club on the site of Hanover Farm and was designed by Reg Plumbridge.

=== Parks and playing fields ===
==== King George V playing field ====
This is located next to Bull Lane, Hockley Road and Websters Way.

It contains a snack bar and pavilion, as well as a Teen shelter. Its two grass football pitches are used by Rayleigh FC, Chronicles FC and Ralee FC. There is also a skate park and a children's playground, containing a variety of play equipment. The park is also home to Rayleigh Bowls Club, which leases the use of the pavilion.

Rayleigh Lions holds an annual fireworks display on the playing field.

==== Sweyne Park ====
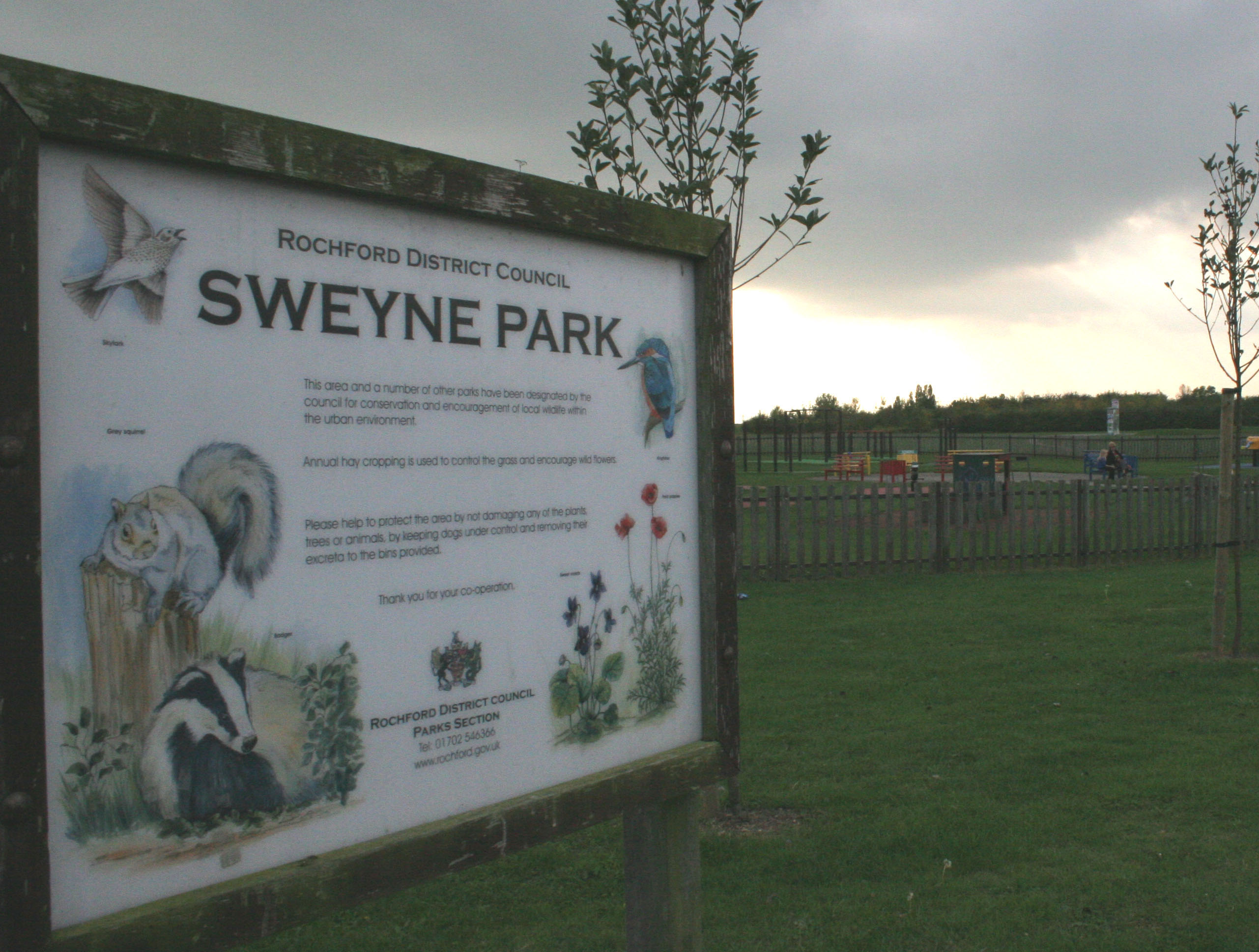
The park sign

Sweyne Park is controlled by Rochford District Council. It is situated north of Sweyne Park School and can be accessed in several ways. The entrance in Downhall Park Way has a small car park and there is a play area. It has another smaller entrance in Downhall Park Way, adjacent to Canterbury Close; it can also be accessed from Victoria Avenue. In 2008, an entrance was established from Priory Chase. The park has a pond. It has a bridleway running round its perimeter of about 1.2 mi (2 km).

==== Wheatley Wood ====
This is a 64-acre (26 ha) broadleaved wood established in the late 1990s. It was designed and planted by a partnership of Local people and the Woodland Trust. There is a car park at the Grange Community Centre in Little Wheatley Chase and access to the wood is across the playing fields.

==== Kingley Wood ====
Kingley Wood stands on a steep hill slope beside the A127 and is visible when approaching Rayleigh from London. The small wood is the only surviving ancient wood in Rayleigh, but it has rich and varied wildlife and a well-documented history.

=== Greyhounds and speedway ===
At least two greyhound racing tracks existed in the town. The main venue was the Rayleigh Weir Stadium, which also hosted speedway and traded from 1948-1974.

A smaller short lived track at O'Tooles Meadow, Wickford Road, off the Down Hall Road, also hosted greyhound racing and dirt track speedway. The racing was independent (Note: Not affiliated to the sports governing body, the National Greyhound Racing Club.) and was known as a flapping track. (Note: This was the nickname given to independent tracks.) The track opened in 1932, but the date of closure is not known; it is possible that it may have been the same venue known as the Rayleigh Sports Stadium, although it is also possible that it may have been a third separate venue.

== Gallery ==
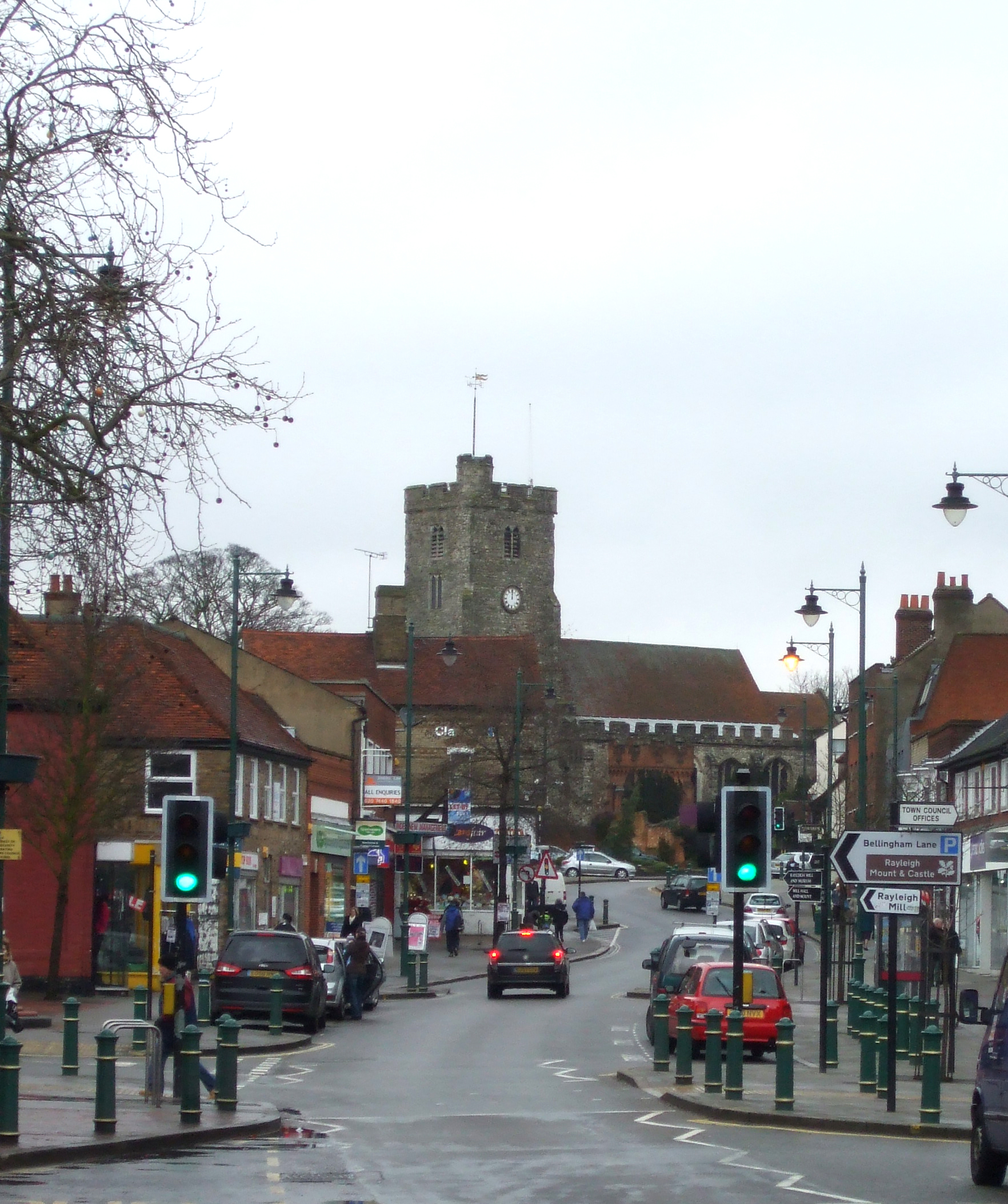
Rayleigh High Street looking towards Holy Trinity Church.

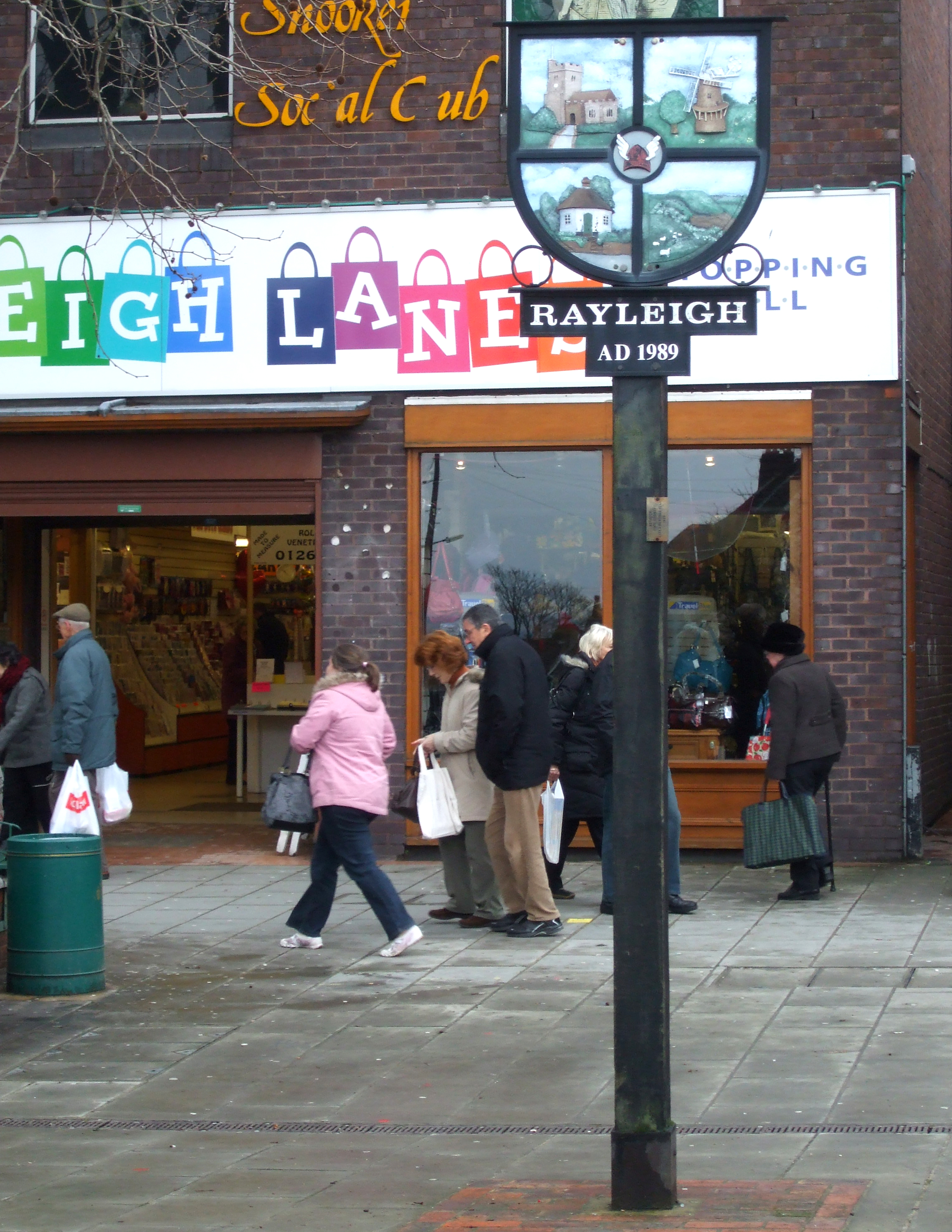
The town sign outside Rayleigh Lanes Indoor Market.

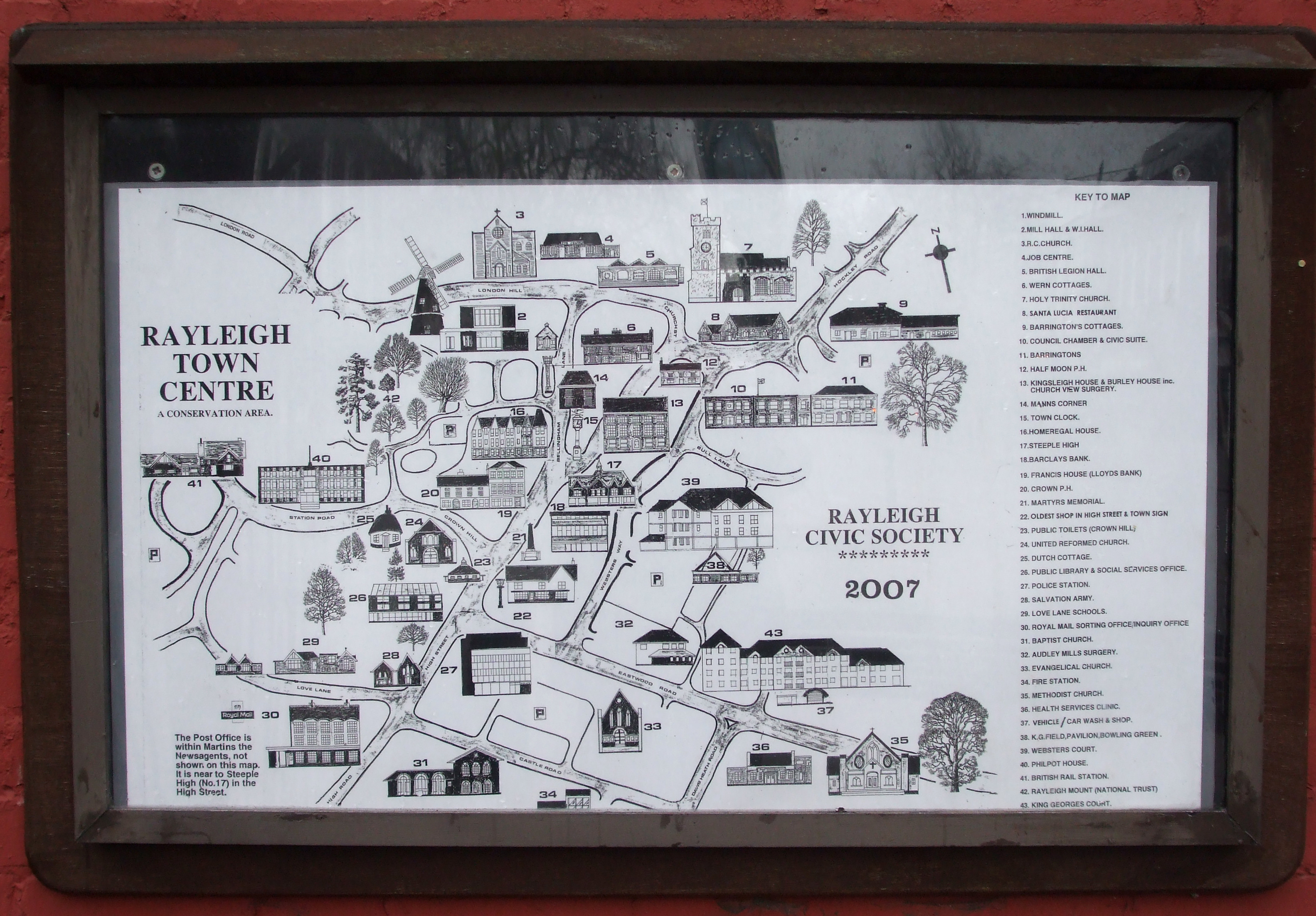
Map of Rayleigh Town Centre. Found on wall near the Millennium Clock.

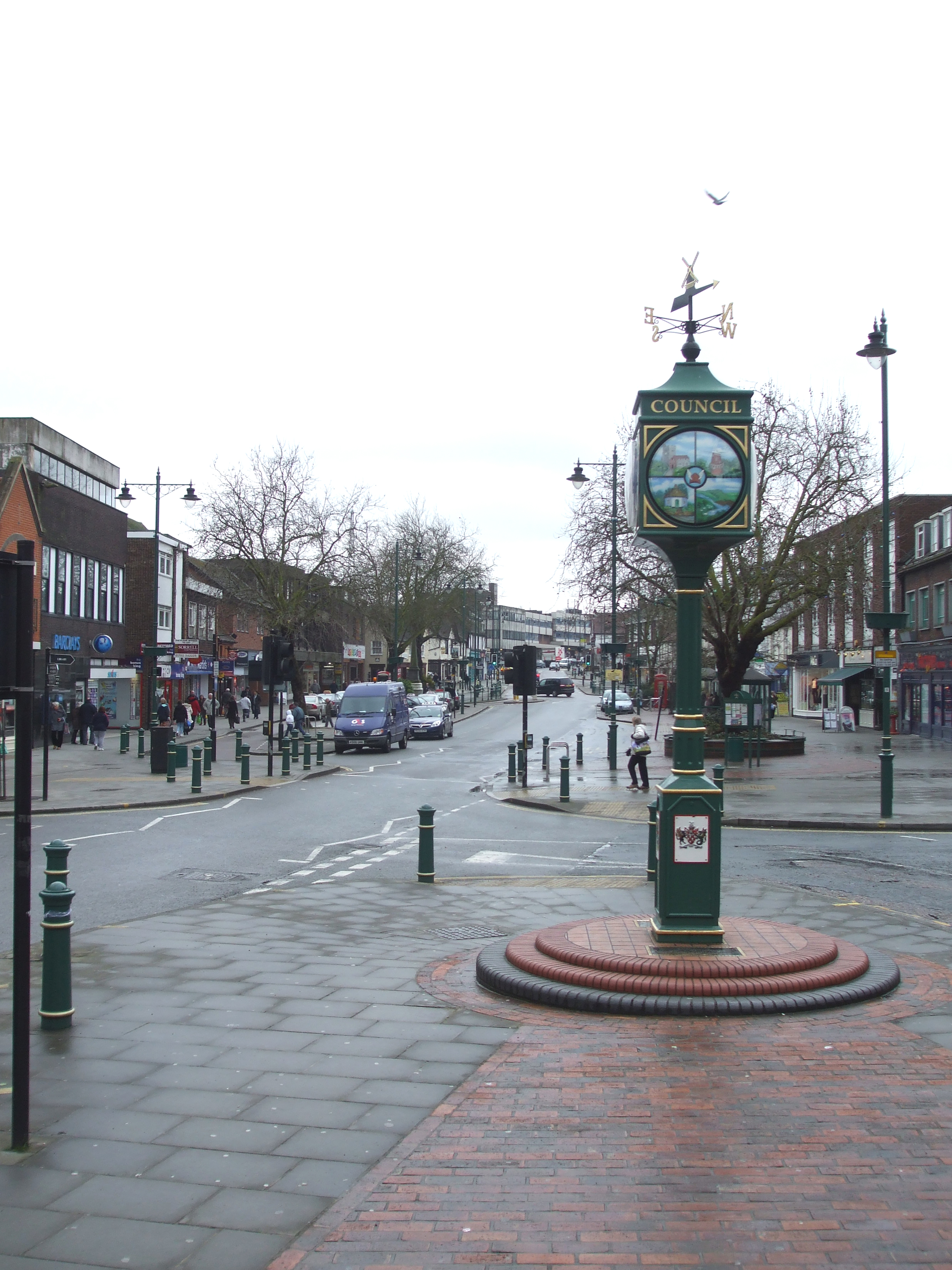
The side of the Millennium Clock, looking towards the police station.

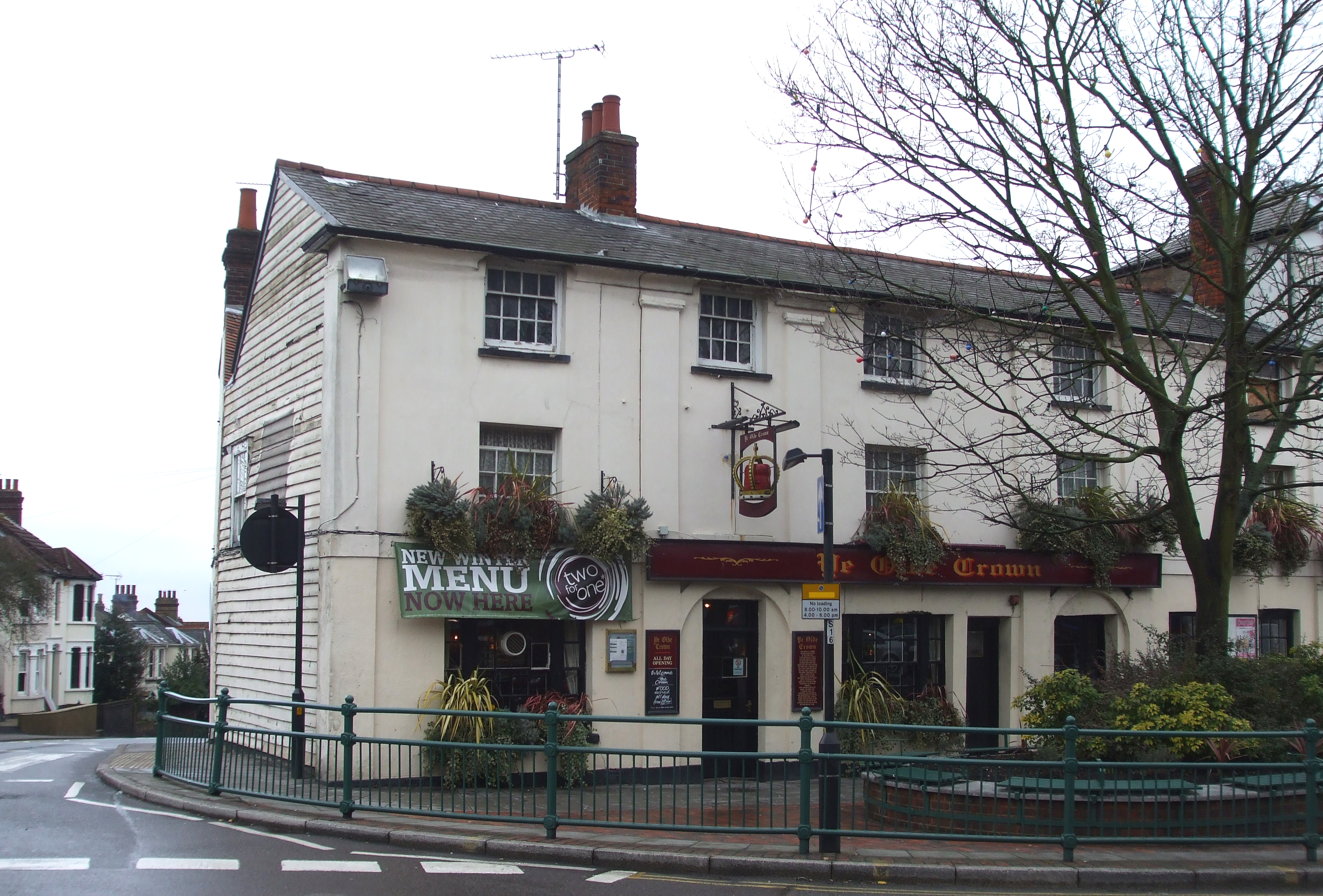
Ye Olde Crown.

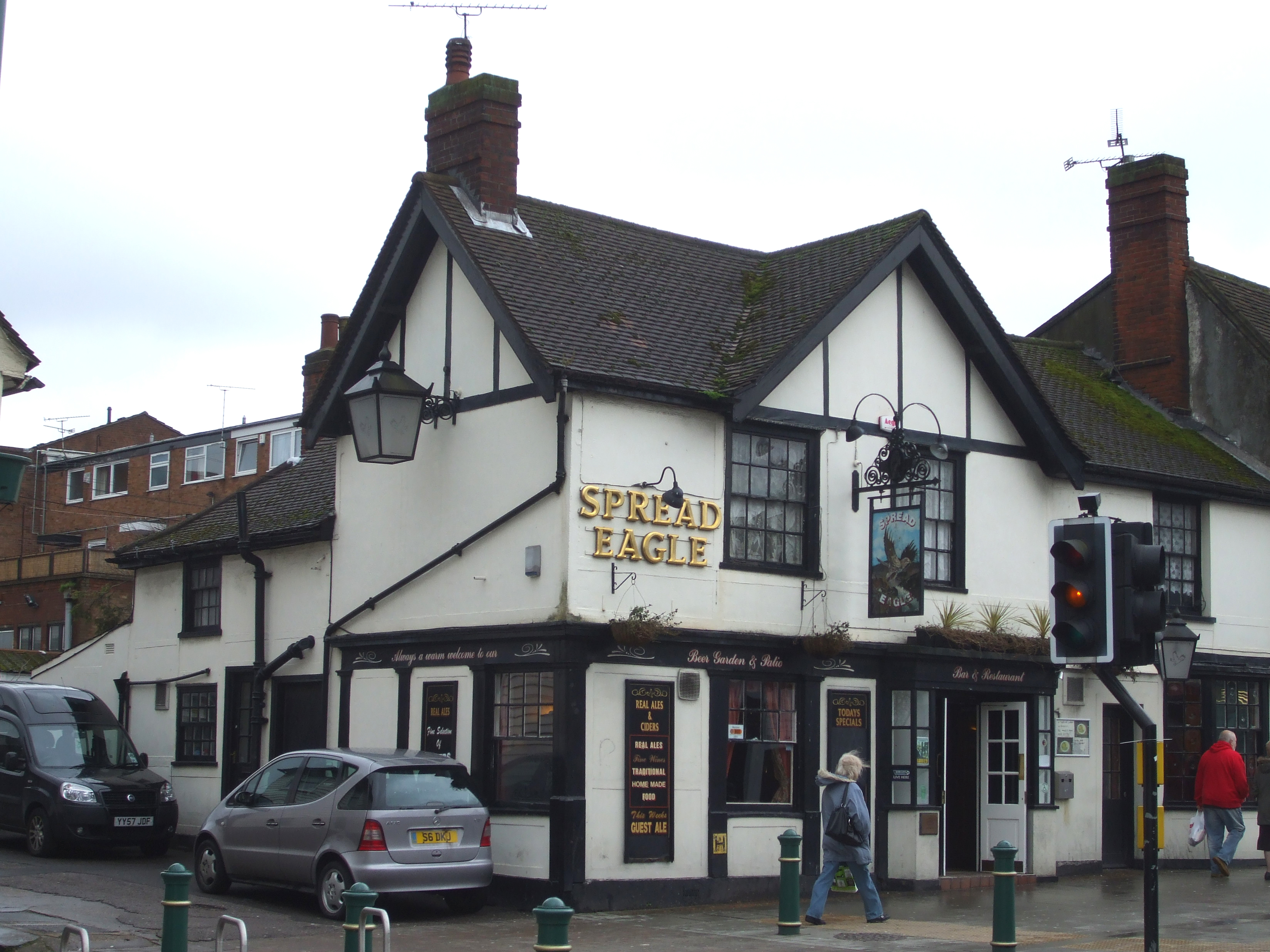
Spread Eagle.

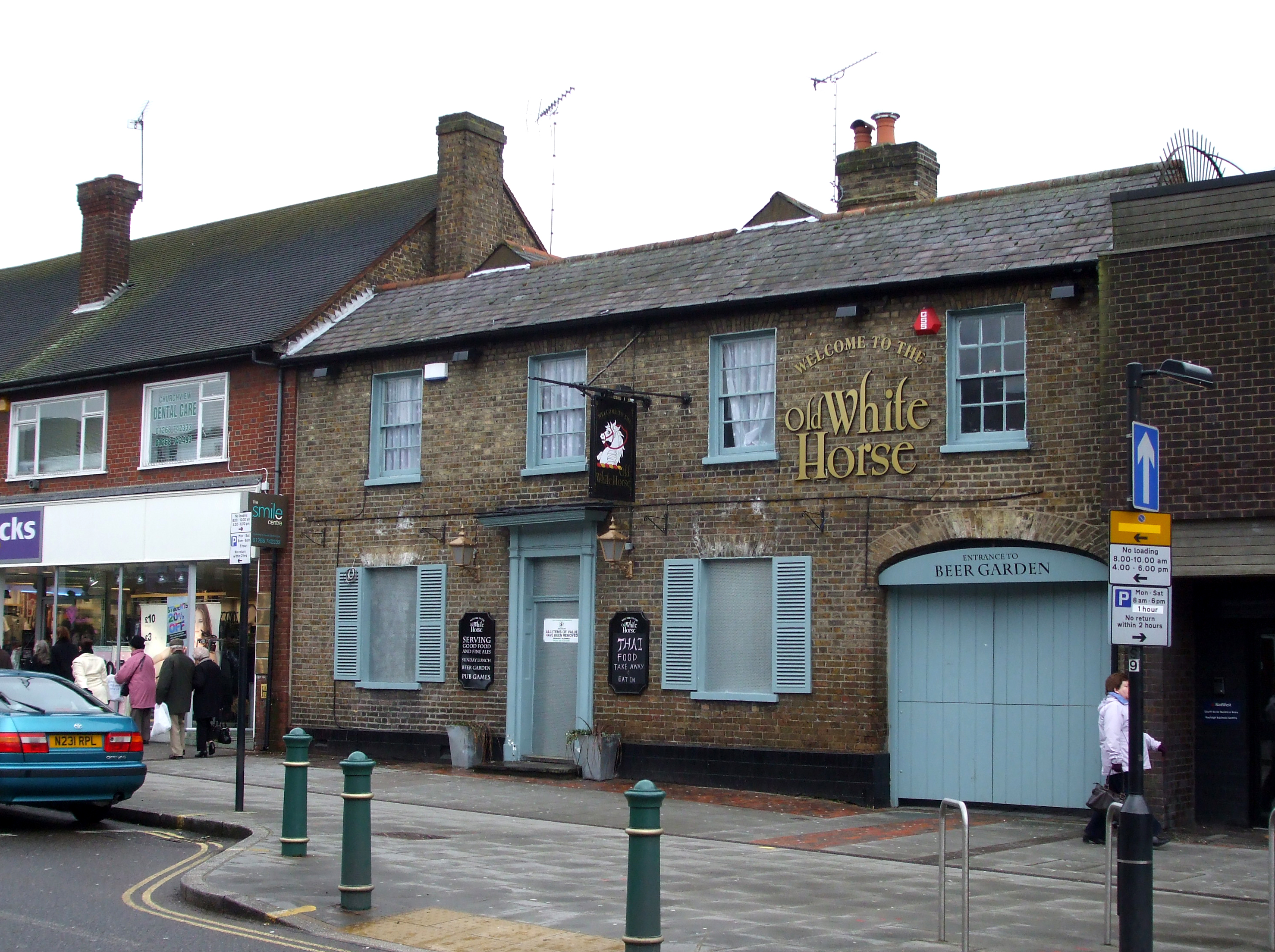
Old White Horse.

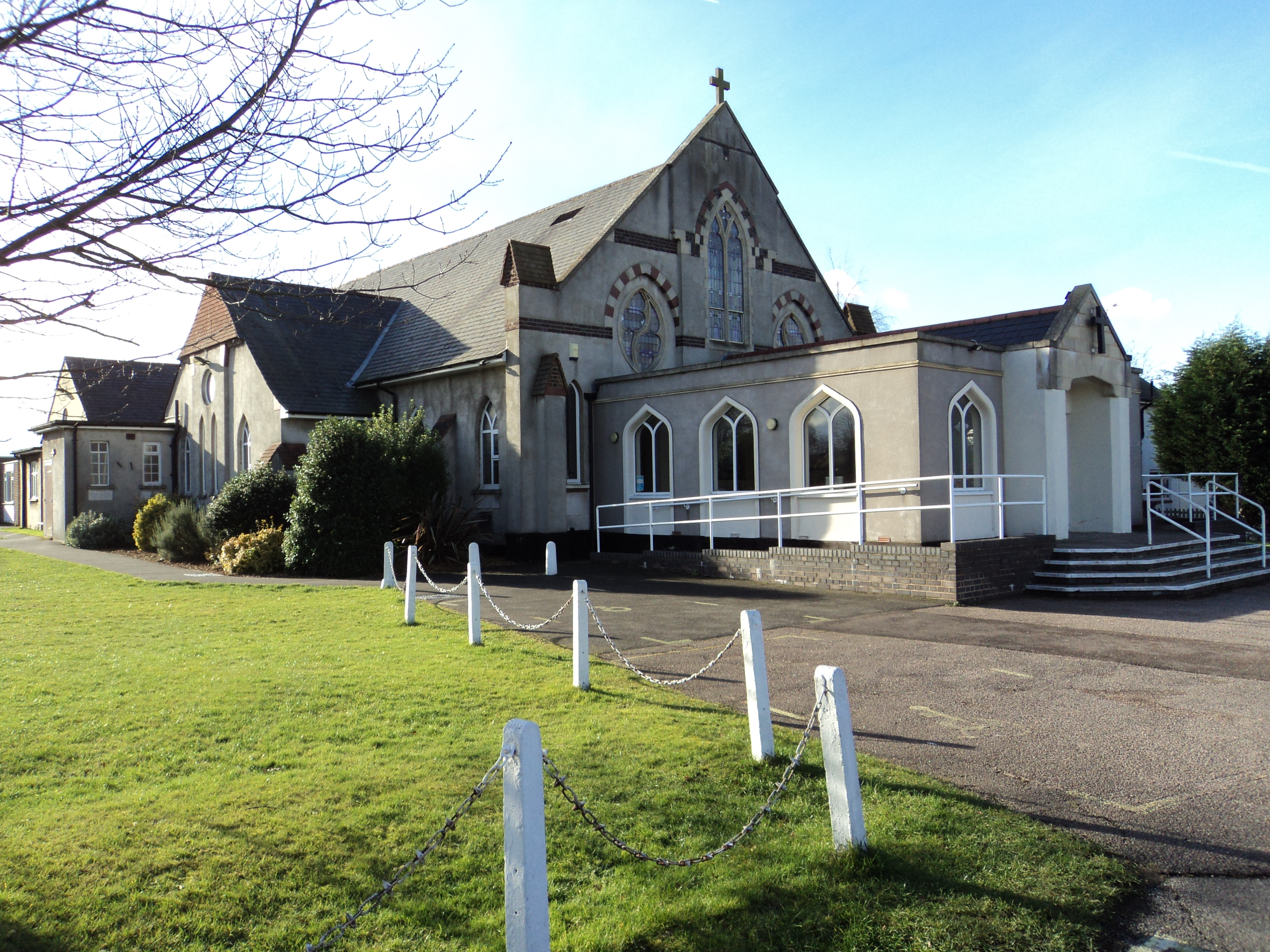
Rayleigh Methodist church from Eastwood Road.
