= FitzWimarc School =

Coordinates: 51.5905°N 0.6123°E

The Eli Smith School

Location
- Hockley Road; Rayleigh, Essex, SS6 8EB; England

Information
- Other name: Fitz (Colloquially)
- Type: Academy
- Established: 1927; 99 years ago
- Local authority: Essex County Council
- Department for Education URN: 141841 Tables
- Ofsted: Reports
- Head teacher: Robert Harris
- Age range: 11–19
- Enrolment: 1584
- Capacity: 1670
- Website: www.fitzwimarc.com

FitzWimarc School is a secondary school in Rayleigh, United Kingdom, named after the Norman land-holder Robert FitzWimarc. The current headteacher is Robert Harris.

== History ==
- 1927 - Opened as Rayleigh Council Senior School at first location on Love Lane.
- 30 August 1937 - Moved to Hockley Road.
- 19 November 1937 - Opening ceremony performed by John W. Burrows J.P., Chairman of the Southend Higher Education Committee.
- 10 April 1945 - Re-opened as a secondary modern school with a new name ‘Rayleigh Secondary Modern School’ and an extended catchment of 11- to 15-year-olds.
- 1948 - Renamed Rayleigh Secondary Modern and Technical School.
- 1964 - Home Economics block built.
- 1967 - Re-opened as a comprehensive school and renamed Fitzwimarc Comprehensive School.
- 1 March 2015 - Converted to an academy.
- September 2016 - Opened Fitzwimarc Sixth Form.

== School performance ==
As of May 2023, the school's most recent Ofsted inspection was on the 6th October 2022, with a judgement of Good.
