= Regional minister (England) =

English ministerial position (2007–2010)

In England, regional ministers were part-time ministerial positions in the Government of the United Kingdom from 2007 until 2010. Each minister had other departmental responsibilities, as well as specific responsibilities for one of the English regions. Their stated role was "to provide a clear sense of strategic direction for the nine English regions and to help strengthen their links with central government."

Following the 2010 general election, the Prime Minister's Spokesman was asked on 17 May 2010 if Regional Ministers had been scrapped. He said that the process of completing appointments to the Government was continuing, and that the Prime Minister, David Cameron, "had been very clear on the importance of devolution". On 4 June 2010 the Evening Standard reported that the post of Minister for London had been scrapped. No formal announcements were made in relation to regional ministers, but as of October 2010 no appointments had been made by the coalition government.

Since 2010, a number of similar roles have been created, including a Minister for Cities in 2011, Minister for Portsmouth in 2014 and Minister for the Northern Powerhouse in May 2015.

== Background ==
Regional ministers in England were first appointed by the incoming Prime Minister, Gordon Brown, on 28 June 2007, as part of his initial Government reshuffle. At the time, his spokesman said that their role would be "to act as regional champions within government, and to represent the government in parliamentary debates and other forums on regional issues."

A proposal to establish such ministerial positions had been made by think tank the New Local Government Network (NLGN) in its report Redesigning Regionalism: Leadership and Accountability in England's Regions, which in turn had developed from a 2006 pamphlet written by MPs Ed Balls and John Healey, and NLGN Director and former MP Chris Leslie. Establishing regional ministerial posts was proposed by the NLGN "if devolution from Whitehall to regional and local leadership is regarded as too big a step straight away". The report argued that "...the appointment of a series of Ministerial portfolio holders to represent and act for Government as policy leaders in each of the English regional might provide a greater degree of focus for regional policy, encourage a more integrated approach across Whitehall, and offer superior opportunities for scrutiny and cross-examination of regional decisions in Parliament." It followed from the 2004 rejection by voters in the North East of England of a proposed elected regional assembly.

In London, the post of Minister for London had first been established by the then Conservative government in 1994.

== Responsibilities ==
The Governance of Britain Green Paper, published in July 2007, provided the following objectives for regional ministers:

1. to advise the Secretary of State for the Department for Business, Innovation and Skills (BIS) on the approval of regional strategies and appointment of Regional Development Agency (RDA) chairs and boards;
2. to represent regional interests in the formulation of central government policy relevant to economic growth and sustainable development in areas that have not been devolved to the RDAs
3. to facilitate a joined up approach across government departments and agencies to enable the effective delivery of the single regional strategy
4. to champion the region at high level events and with regard to high-profile projects (including through a programme of regional visits); and
5. to represent the Government with regard to central government policy at regional committee hearings and at parliamentary debates focused specifically on the region.

It also stated:

There are a range of functions that Regional Ministers will undertake. These are mostly clustered around the responsibilities of the Government Offices and the Regional Development Agencies, particularly in relation to economic development. Regional Ministers will be able to take questions in Parliament on the work of regional bodies, and on regional strategies. Regional ministers will be a visible representative of their area – they will take a key role in bringing together local services and different arms of government at important times for the region, whether in bidding for or hosting major sporting occasions (e.g. the Commonwealth Games); or when a region faces difficult challenges (e.g. the severe flooding afflicting Yorkshire and the Humber, and the East and West Midlands in June 2007).

== Opposition ==
The establishment of the regional minister posts was opposed by the Conservative opposition. In a 2009 debate on the setting up of regional Select Committees of Parliament, to which the regional ministers report, the Shadow Leader of the House, Alan Duncan, said:

The document The Governance of Britain says that regional Ministers, who are supposedly to be held to account by these Select Committees, do all sorts of important things. It sets out their responsibilities, stating that they "represent", "facilitate", "champion" and again "represent" various things in the document. But do they decide anything? No, they do not. These Ministers are fictitious Ministers, supposedly joining up the various tentacles of government and somehow making a Minister in one Department tie his or her decisions in with those of a Minister in another Department. The people who should be held to account, if that is necessary, are the Ministers who take those decisions, not these supposed facilitators who have no executive responsibility whatever. They are faux Ministers – false Ministers – and they do not really exist as Ministers at all.

== Ministerial appointments 2007-2010 ==
The nine Government regions of England, as at 2010

=== London ===
| Name | Portrait | Title | Concurrent Office | Term start | Term end |
|---|---|---|---|---|---|
| Tessa Jowell | | Minister for London | Paymaster General Minister for the Olympics | 28 June 2007 | 3 October 2008 |
| Tony McNulty | | Minister for London | Minister of State for Employment and Welfare Reform | 3 October 2008 | 5 June 2009 |
| Tessa Jowell | | Minister for London | Paymaster General Minister for the Olympics Minister for the Cabinet Office | 5 June 2009 | 11 May 2010 |

=== South East ===
| Name | Portrait | Title | Concurrent Office | Term start | Term end |
|---|---|---|---|---|---|
| Jonathan Shaw | | Minister of State for the South East | Parliamentary Under-Secretary of State for Marine, Landscape and Rural Affairs | 28 June 2007 | 5 October 2008 |
| Jonathan Shaw | | Minister of State for the South East | Minister of State for Disabled People (Note: Parliamentary Under-Secretary of State (2008–09)) | 5 October 2008 | 11 May 2010 |

=== South West ===
| Name | Portrait | Title | Concurrent Office | Term start | Term end |
|---|---|---|---|---|---|
| Ben Bradshaw | | Minister of State for the South West | Minister of State for Health | 28 June 2007 | 5 June 2009 |
| Jim Knight | | Minister of State for the South West | Minister of State for Employment and Welfare Reform | 5 June 2009 | 11 May 2010 |

=== West Midlands ===
| Name | Portrait | Title | Concurrent Office | Term start | Term end |
|---|---|---|---|---|---|
| Liam Byrne | | Minister of State for the West Midlands | Minister of State for Borders and Immigration | 28 June 2007 | 5 October 2008 |
| Ian Austin | | Minister of State for the West Midlands | Assistant Government Whip | 5 October 2008 | 9 June 2009 |
| Ian Austin | | Minister of State for the West Midlands | Parliamentary Under-Secretary of State for Communities and Local Government | 9 June 2009 | 11 May 2010 |

=== North West ===
| Name | Portrait | Title | Concurrent Office | Term start | Term end |
|---|---|---|---|---|---|
| Phil Woolas | | Minister of State for the North West | Minister of State for Local Government Minister of State for the Environment | 28 June 2007 | 4 October 2008 |
| Phil Woolas | | Minister of State for the North West | Minister of State for the Treasury Minister of State for Borders and Immigration | 4 October 2008 | 11 May 2010 |

=== North East ===
| Name | Portrait | Title | Concurrent Office | Term start | Term end |
|---|---|---|---|---|---|
| Nick Brown | | Minister of State for the North East | Deputy Chief Whip of the Government Treasurer of the Household | 28 June 2007 | 3 October 2008 |
| Nick Brown | | Minister of State for the North East | Chief Whip of the House of Commons Parliamentary Secretary to the Treasury | 4 October 2008 | 11 May 2010 |

=== Yorkshire and the Humber ===
| Name | Portrait | Title | Concurrent Office | Term start | Term end |
|---|---|---|---|---|---|
| Caroline Flint | | Minister of State for Yorkshire and the Humber | Minister of State for Employment | 28 June 2007 | 24 January 2008 |
| Rosie Winterton | | Minister of State for Yorkshire and the Humber | Minister of State for Work and Pensions | 24 January 2008 | 5 June 2009 |
| Rosie Winterton | | Minister of State for Yorkshire and the Humber | Minister of State for Local Government | 5 June 2009 | 11 May 2010 |

=== East Midlands ===
| Name | Portrait | Title | Concurrent Office | Term start | Term end |
|---|---|---|---|---|---|
| Gillian Merron | | Minister of State for the East Midlands | Parliamentary Secretary to the Cabinet Office | 28 June 2007 | 24 January 2008 |
| Phil Hope | | Minister of State for the East Midlands | | 24 January 2008 | 5 October 2008 |
| Phil Hope | | Minister of State for the East Midlands | Minister of State for Care Services | 5 October 2008 | 11 May 2010 |

=== East ===
| Name | Portrait | Title | Concurrent Office | Term start | Term end |
|---|---|---|---|---|---|
| Barbara Follett | | Minister of State for the East | Parliamentary Under-Secretary of State for Work and Pensions | 28 June 2007 | 24 November 2007 |
| Barbara Follett | | Minister of State for the East | Parliamentary Under-Secretary of State for Equality | 24 November 2007 | 4 October 2008 |
| Barbara Follett | | Minister of State for the East | Minister for Culture and Tourism | 4 October 2008 | 22 September 2009 |
| Barbara Follett | | Minister of State for the East | Parliamentary Under-Secretary of State for Communities and Local Government | 22 September 2009 | 11 May 2010 |

== Developments since 2010 ==
In July 2011, Greg Clark was appointed to the new role of Minister for Cities, which from July 2014 was combined with Minister for Universities and Science. The role was abolished upon Clark's promotion to Secretary of State for Communities and Local Government in May 2015.

In January 2014, the post of Minister for Portsmouth was created, with the aim to help support the city's shipbuilding industry. The role was initially held by Michael Fallon until the appointment of Matthew Hancock in July 2014, who was replaced by Mark Francois in May 2015.

In April 2014, Labour leader Ed Miliband proposed the reintroduction of regional ministers, corresponding to the nine English regions, who would sit on a new regional committee based at the Cabinet Office.

In May 2015, James Wharton was appointed to the new role of Minister for the Northern Powerhouse, focusing on wider devolution to English "core cities" including Manchester, Leeds, Sheffield, Liverpool, and Newcastle.

== See also ==
- Government Offices for the English Regions
- Regional development agency
- Category:Regional select committees of the British House of Commons
