= Feltag =

FELTAG is an acronym for Further Education Learning Technology Action Group, based in the United Kingdom. The group was convened by the Minister of State for Skills and Enterprise, Matthew Hancock at the Department of Business, Innovation and Skills.

The group published a paper in June 2014 entitled Paths forward to a digital future for Further Education and Skills which was informed by research commissioned by the Institute for Prospective Technological Studies. The paper argued that the FE sector must keep abreast of change, as digital technologies will have a "profound effect on the economic and social well-being of the country" and that "learners must be empowered to fully exploit their own understanding of, and familiarity with digital technology for their own learning".

The group have made a number of recommendations concerning the use of learning technologies in the further education sector (considered to be any education for students aged 16+, despite the raising of the compulsory education age to 18 in 2013). The most notable recommendation is that by 2015, further education courses should consist of a minimum of 10 per cent online learning. This is a recent educational reform for the United Kingdom, the aim of which is to increase computer literacy among students / the future workforce.

The report notes that most teachers (and indeed students) have access to smart devices such as smartphones and tablet computers which can provide excellent learning opportunities.

FELTAG has been supported by Ofsted, the Skills Funding Agency, and Ofqual, and is set to make some changes to the Common Inspection Framework, which details the features which should be focused on during an Ofsted inspection of a learning provider.
