= Minister for Portsmouth =

Role within the Government of the UK (2014–2016)

- Royal Arms as used by His Majesty's Government
- Department for Communities and Local Government
- Formation: 2014
- First holder: Michael Fallon
- Final holder: Mark Francois
- Abolished: 2016

The Minister for Portsmouth was a ministerial role within the Government of the United Kingdom. It was created in January 2014 with the appointment of Michael Fallon as the first Minister for Portsmouth. The post was created in response to the loss of jobs from BAE Systems in the local shipyard. The minister was charged with bringing economic growth to the city.

In the Cabinet reshuffle of 15 July 2014 this role moved to Matthew Hancock, whose full title was Minister of State for Energy, Business and Portsmouth. Following the Conservative Party's success in the 2015 general election, Hancock was succeeded by Mark Francois as Minister for Portsmouth, but Francois was not replaced when he left in the July 2016 reshuffle.

== List of ministers for Portsmouth ==
Colour key (for political parties):
Conservative

Portrait	Name	Term of office		Concurrently held office	Political party	Prime Minister
	Michael Fallon; MP for Sevenoaks	16 January 2014	15 July 2014	– Minister of State for Energy – Minister for Business and Enterprise	Conservative	David Cameron (I)
	Matthew Hancock; MP for West Suffolk	15 July 2014	11 May 2015	– Minister of State for Energy – Minister for Business and Enterprise	Conservative	David Cameron (I)
	Mark Francois; MP for Rayleigh and Wickford	11 May 2015	16 July 2016	– Minister of State for Communities and Resilience	Conservative	David Cameron (II)
