= Minister for Cities =

Various countries have at various time had a Minister for Cities or similarly named position.

- Minister for Cities, in Australia
- City Minister, in the United Kingdom
- Minister for Cities, in the United Kingdom
- New South Wales Minister for Cities
- Cabinet Secretary for Health, Wellbeing and Cities Strategy, in Scotland
- Minister for Cities and Rural Areas, in Denmark
- Minister for cities and urban development, in Côte d'Ivoire
- State Secretary for Cities, in France
