= Rayleigh (constituency) =

UK Parliament constituency (1997–2010)

Coordinates: 51.59°N 0.66°E

- Former county constituency for the House of Commons
- Boundary of Rayleigh in Essex for the 2005 general election

- Location of Essex within England
- County: Essex

1997–2010
- Seats: One
- Created from: Rochford and Chelmsford
- Replaced by: Rayleigh and Wickford and Witham

Rayleigh was a parliamentary constituency in Essex represented in the House of Commons of the Parliament of the United Kingdom. It elected one Member of Parliament (MP) by the first past the post system of election from 1997 to 2010.

== History ==
This seat was created for the 1997 general election primarily from the abolished constituency of Rochford. It was abolished at the next redistribution which came into effect for the 2010 general election, when the town of Wickford was added to form the Rayleigh and Wickford constituency.

This largely rural constituency was the tenth-safest Conservative seat in the United Kingdom and the second-safest seat in Essex.

== Boundaries ==
- The District of Rochford wards of Ashingdon, Canewdon, Downhall, Grange and Rawreth, Hawkwell East, Hawkwell West, Hockley Central, Hockley East, Hockley West, Hullbridge Riverside, Hullbridge South, Lodge, Rayleigh Central, Trinity, Wheatley, and Whitehouse; and
- The Borough of Chelmsford wards of East and West Hanningfield, Rettendon and Runwell, South Hanningfield, South Woodham-Collingwood East, and West and South Woodham-Elmwood and Woodville.

Centred around the town of Rayleigh, the seat was formed primarily from the abolished constituency of Rochford, but excluding the town of Rochford itself. A small area to the north was transferred from the abolished constituency of Chelmsford.

Following their review of parliamentary representation in Essex, which came into effect for the 2010 general election, the Boundary Commission for England made radical alterations to existing constituencies to allow for the number of parliamentary seats in the county to be increased to eighteen. These changes included the formation of a number of new constituencies in the southern and eastern parts of the county. Rayleigh was abolished, with the majority of the constituency, comprising the District of Rochford wards, being combined with the town of Wickford - previously part of the abolished constituency of Billericay - to form the new constituency of Rayleigh and Wickford. The Borough of Chelmsford wards were now included in the re-established constituency of Maldon.

== Members of Parliament ==
Election	Member	Party
1997	Michael Clark	Conservative
2001	Mark Francois	Conservative
2010	Constituency abolished: see Rayleigh and Wickford	

== Elections ==
=== Elections in the 2000s ===
General election 2005: Rayleigh
Party	Candidate	Votes	%	±%
Conservative	Mark Francois	25,609	55.4	+5.3
Labour	Julian Ware-Lane	10,883	23.6	−7.1
Liberal Democrats	Sid Cumberland	7,406	16.0	+0.5
UKIP	Janet Davies	2,295	5.0	+1.3
Majority		14,726	31.8	+12.4
Turnout		46,193	64.2	+3.7
Conservative hold		Swing	+6.2	

General election 2001: Rayleigh
Party	Candidate	Votes	%	±%
Conservative	Mark Francois	21,434	50.1	+0.4
Labour	Paul Clark	13,144	30.7	+1.8
Liberal Democrats	Geoff Williams	6,614	15.5	−4.3
UKIP	Colin Morgan	1,581	3.7	New
Majority		8,290	19.4	−1.4
Turnout		42,773	60.5	−13.8
Conservative hold		Swing	−1.4	

=== Elections in the 1990s ===
The 1997 election result has swings relative to the notional, not the actual, 1992 result.

General election 1997: Rayleigh
Party	Candidate	Votes	%	±%
Conservative	Michael Clark	25,516	49.7	−11.4
Labour	Raymond Ellis	14,832	28.9	+14.1
Liberal Democrats	Sid Cumberland	10,137	19.8	−2.1
Liberal	Alan Farmer	829	1.6	New
Majority		10,684	20.8	−18.4
Turnout		51,314	74.3	
Conservative hold		Swing	−12.7	

== See also ==
- List of parliamentary constituencies in Essex
