= Michael Clark (British politician) =

British politician

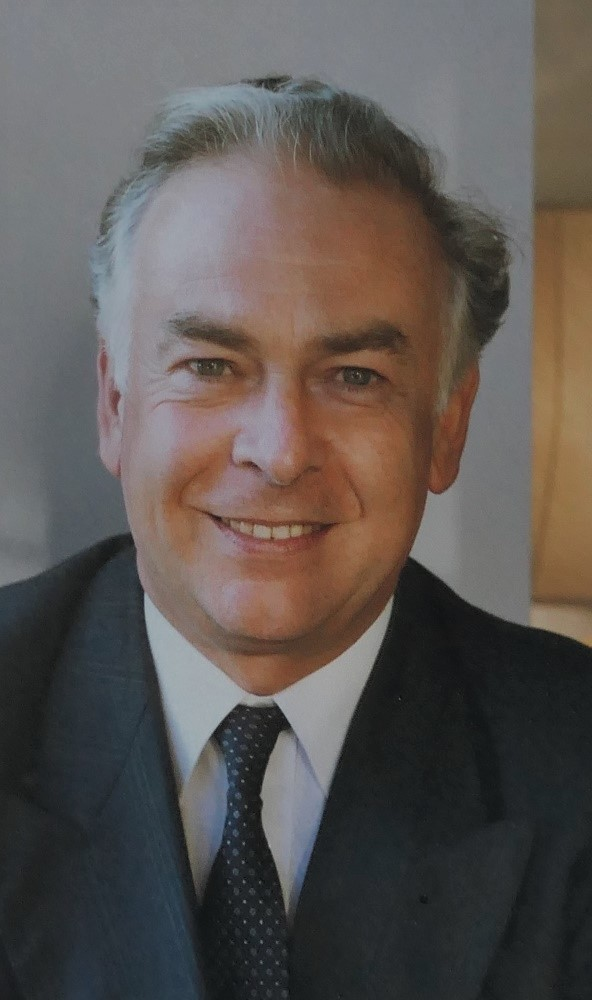

Member of Parliament for Rayleigh Rochford (1983–1997)
- In office 9 June 1983 – 14 May 2001
- Preceded by: Constituency Established
- Succeeded by: Mark Francois

Personal details
- Born: 8 August 1935 (age 91)
- Party: Conservative
- Education: King's College London; University of Minnesota; St John's College, Cambridge

Dr Michael Clark (born 8 August 1935) is a Conservative Party politician in the United Kingdom.

== Early life ==
He was educated at King Edward VI Grammar School, East Retford and King's College London, where he graduated with a BSc (1st class Hons) in Chemistry in 1956, and subsequently studied at the University of Minnesota on a Fulbright Scholarship, before completing a PhD in Chemistry at St John's College, Cambridge in 1960. He worked for some years with ICI Plastics Division, initially as a Research Scientist, but subsequently as a Factory Manager. Later, he joined the motor industry, introducing plastics into the manufacture of cars and commercial vehicles. In 1969, he became a manufacturing consultant with the PA Consulting Group in London, and was a Trustee from 1994 to 2000.

== Political career ==
Dr Clark held office at constituency level in Cambridgeshire between 1969 and 1983 being County Treasurer 1975–1978, and Chairman 1980–1983. He first stood, unsuccessfully, at Ilkeston in 1979, being defeated by the Labour incumbent Ray Fletcher. He served as Conservative Party Member of Parliament for Rochford from 1983 until 1997, then, with its abolition, for the new constituency of Rayleigh from 1997 until he stood down at the 2001 general election.

In Parliament he was active in all matters involving science and technology joining, in 1983, the Energy Select Committee, becoming Chairman 1989–1992. With the demise of that Committee he was elected Chairman of the All-Party Group for Energy Studies. From 1992 to 1994 he served on the Trade and Industry Select Committee, then in the Labour Government of 1997 until his retirement he was Chairman of the Science and Technology Select Committee. From 1985 to 1988 he was Hon Secretary of the Parliamentary and Scientific Committee then Founding Treasurer and later Chairman (1993–1997) of the Parliamentary Office of Science and Technology, (P.O.S.T.).

Clark was Chairman of the British Russian Parliamentary Group 1994–2001 and British Venezuelan Parliamentary Group 1995–2001, having previously been Hon Secretary of the Nepalese and Malawi Parliamentary Groups. He was an Executive Member of the Inter Parliamentary Union, IPU, from 1987 to 1994, being Chairman 1990–1993.

He was invited to join the Speaker's Panel of Chairmen in 1997 chairing the House at the Committee stage of the Budget in 2001 just before retiring. He was elected to the Executive of the 1922 Committee in 1997. he also served (1995–2001) on the Advisory Panel of the Conservation Foundation and the advisory board of the Fulbright Commission. He was a national vice-president of the UN50 celebrations in 1995.

In 1994 he introduced as a Private Member's Bill the Road Traffic (New Drivers) Bill to make specific penalties for newly qualified drivers who commit offences, including re-testing their competence to drive.

Locally, he was President of many organisations including Arthritis Care, Ashingdon Carnival, Chelmsford Industrial Museum, Hawkwell Boys Football Club, Hockley and Hawkwell Old People's Welfare, Leigh Orpheus Male Voice Choir, Mayday Mobile, Rayleigh Brass, Rochford Civic Aid, Rochford District Mencap, South East Essex Youth Symphony Orchestra and the Rayleigh St. John Ambulance Cadets.

He is a Fellow of his alma mater, King's College London, a Fellow of the Royal Society of Chemistry, and a Companion of the Institute of Energy. In 1992 he gave the Alf Robens Memorial lecture at the Royal Institution and was awarded the BCURA gold medal.

The former Speaker of the House of Commons, John Bercow MP, began his Parliamentary career working as a researcher for Michael Clark.

Parliament of the United Kingdom
| Constituency established | Member of Parliament for Rochford; 1983–1997 | Constituency abolished |
| Constituency established | Member of Parliament for Rayleigh; 1997–2001 | Succeeded by Mark Francois |
