= Rochford (constituency) =

UK Parliament constituency (1983–1997)

Coordinates: 51.58°N 0.71°E

- Former county constituency for the House of Commons
- Rochford, showing boundaries used from 1983–1997
- County: Essex

1983–1997
- Seats: One
- Created from: Chelmsford, Maldon, South East Essex, Southend East
- Replaced by: Rayleigh, Rochford and Southend East, Maldon and Chelmsford East

Rochford was a County Constituency in Essex, represented in the House of Commons of the Parliament of the United Kingdom from 1983 until 1997. It elected one Member of Parliament (MP) by the first past the post system of election.

== History ==
The seat was created for the 1983 general election from parts of the Maldon, Chelmsford and abolished South East Essex constituencies. It was abolished at the next redistribution which came into effect for the 1997 general election, when it was largely replaced by the new constituency of Rayleigh, with the town of Rochford itself being included in the new constituency of Rochford and Southend East.

It was held by Michael Clark for the Conservatives throughout its existence.

== Boundaries ==
- The District of Rochford; and
- The Borough of Chelmsford wards of Ramsden Heath and Downham, Rettendon and South Hanningfield, Runwell, Woodham Ferrers North, and Woodham Ferrers South.

The District of Rochford comprised the former Rural District of Rochford, which had been part of the Maldon constituency, and the former Urban District of Rayleigh, which had been part of the abolished South East Essex constituency. The Borough of Chelmsford wards had previously been in the Chelmsford constituency.

On abolition in 1997, the bulk of the constituency formed the new constituency of Rayleigh, with Rochford and Great Wakering being included in the new constituency of Rochford and Southend East.

== Members of Parliament ==
Election	Member	Party
1983	Michael Clark	Conservative
1997	constituency abolished: see Rayleigh, Rochford and Southend East & Maldon and Chelmsford East	

== Elections ==
=== Elections in the 1980s ===
General election 1983: Rochford
Party	Candidate	Votes	%	±%
Conservative	Michael Clark	29,495	57.84	−3.28
Liberal	Richard Boyd	16,393	32.15	+14.11
Labour	Hyman Witzer	5,105	10.01	−10.83
Majority		13,102	25.69	
Turnout		50,993	73.49	
Conservative win (new seat)				

General election 1987: Rochford
Party	Candidate	Votes	%	±%
Conservative	Michael Clark	35,872	60.4	+2.6
Liberal	Philip Young	16,178	27.3	−4.8
Labour	David Weir	7,308	12.3	+2.3
Majority		19,694	33.1	+7.4
Turnout		59,358	78.0	+4.5
Conservative hold		Swing		

=== Elections in the 1990s ===
General election 1992: Rochford
Party	Candidate	Votes	%	±%
Conservative	Michael Clark	38,967	61.1	+0.7
Liberal Democrats	Nicholas Harris	12,931	20.3	−7.0
Labour	Donald Quinn	10,537	16.5	+4.2
Liberal	Linda Farmer	1,362	2.1	New
Majority		26,036	40.8	+7.7
Turnout		63,797	83.0	+5.0
Conservative hold		Swing	+3.8	
