= Mark Francois =

British politician (born 1965)

The Right Honourable Mark Francois MP
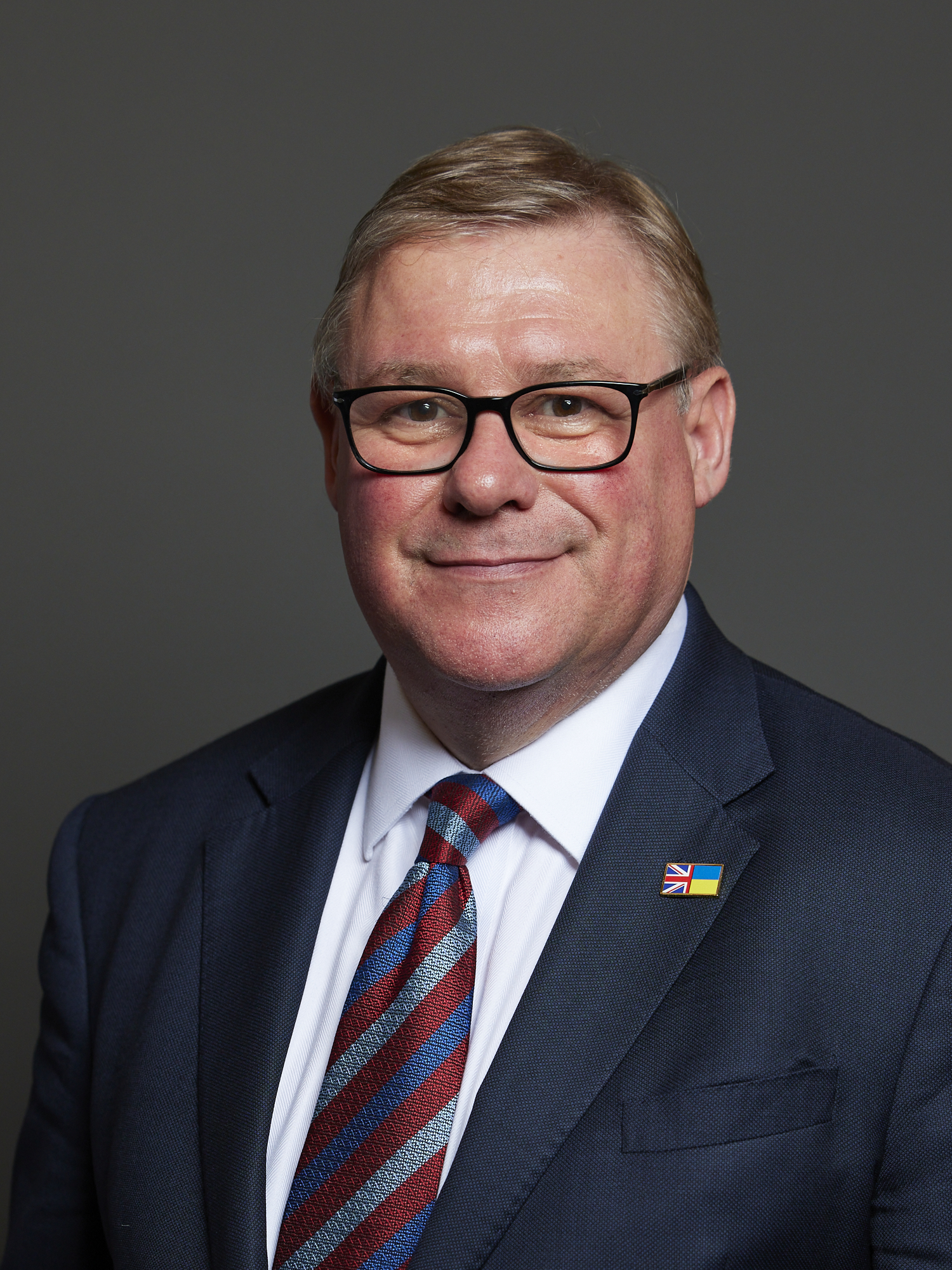
- Official portrait, 2024

Shadow Minister for Defence
- Incumbent
- Assumed office 5 November 2024
- Leader: Kemi Badenoch
- Preceded by: Stuart Anderson; Danny Kruger

Minister of State for Communities and Resilience
- In office 11 May 2015 – 16 July 2016
- Prime Minister: David Cameron
- Preceded by: Office established
- Succeeded by: Office abolished

Minister of State for Portsmouth
- In office 11 May 2015 – 16 July 2016
- Prime Minister: David Cameron; Theresa May
- Preceded by: Matt Hancock
- Succeeded by: Office abolished

Minister of State for the Armed Forces
- In office 7 October 2013 – 11 May 2015
- Prime Minister: David Cameron
- Preceded by: Andrew Robathan
- Succeeded by: Penny Mordaunt

Minister of State for Defence Personnel, Welfare and Veterans
- In office 4 September 2012 – 7 October 2013
- Prime Minister: David Cameron
- Preceded by: Andrew Robathan
- Succeeded by: Anna Soubry

Vice-Chamberlain of the Household
- In office 11 May 2010 – 4 September 2012
- Prime Minister: David Cameron
- Preceded by: Helen Jones
- Succeeded by: Greg Knight

Shadow Minister for Europe
- In office 29 May 2007 – 11 May 2010
- Leader: David Cameron
- Preceded by: Graham Brady
- Succeeded by: Chris Bryant

Member of Parliament for Rayleigh and Wickford Rayleigh (2001–2010)
- Incumbent
- Assumed office 7 June 2001
- Preceded by: Michael Clark
- Majority: 5,621 (11.7%)

Chair of the European Research Group
- Incumbent
- Assumed office 2020
- Preceded by: Steve Baker

Personal details
- Born: 14 August 1965 (age 61) London, England
- Party: Conservative
- Spouses: Karen Thomas (m. 2000; div. 2006) Olivia Sanders (m. 2022)
- Education: University of Bristol; King's College London
- Website: www.markfrancois.com

Military service
- Allegiance: United Kingdom
- Branch/service: Territorial Army
- Years of service: 1983–1989
- Rank: Lieutenant
- Unit: Royal Anglian Regiment

Mark Gino Francois (/frɑːnˈswɑː/; born 14 August 1965) is a British politician who has been the Member of Parliament (MP) for Rayleigh and Wickford since 2001. A member of the Conservative Party, he has been Shadow Minister for Defence since 2024.

Francois served as Vice-Chamberlain of the Household (2010–2012), a Minister of State at the Ministry of Defence (2012–2013) and Minister of State for the Armed Forces (2013–2015). He was also Minister of State for Communities and Resilience and Minister for Portsmouth at the Department for Communities and Local Government from 2015 to 2016.

In 2018, he was appointed deputy chair and de facto whip of the eurosceptic European Research Group (ERG) by chair Jacob Rees-Mogg. He was a critic of the leadership of Theresa May during her time as leader of the Conservative Party.

In March 2020 he became the Chair of the ERG.

== Early life and career ==
Mark Gino Francois was born on 14 August 1965 in Islington, London to Anna (née Carloni) and Reginald Francois. His father was an engineer and his mother was an Italian au pair. The family moved to Basildon in 1971. His secondary education was at the Nicholas Comprehensive School (now part of James Hornsby School). He studied history at the University of Bristol and graduated with a Bachelor of Arts (BA) in 1986. Francois stated that he joined the Conservative Party when he was studying in Bristol. He went on to undertake a Master of Arts (MA) degree in war studies at King's College London, graduating in 1987.

In 1983, whilst at university, he joined the Territorial Army (TA), the part-time reserve force of the British Army. Given the service number 523962, Francois was commissioned as a second lieutenant (on probation) on 18 December 1985. On 1 February 1988, he transferred from the general list to the Royal Anglian Regiment. His commission was confirmed in 1988, and he was granted seniority in the rank of second lieutenant from 18 December 1983. He was promoted lieutenant on 18 September 1988, with seniority in that rank from 18 December 1985. He left the Territorial Army on 21 September 1989.

After university, Francois became a management trainee with Lloyds Bank. He then worked as a political consultant for the lobbying company Market Access International in 1988, leaving to set up his own lobbying firm, Francois Associates, in 1996, which he closed when he was elected as an MP in 2001.

He was a member of Basildon District Council for the Langdon Hills ward from 1991 to 1995. On the council, he served as vice-chair of the housing committee from 1992 to 1995.

== Parliamentary career ==
Francois stood for the Brent East constituency in the 1997 general election, coming second to the incumbent, Labour's Ken Livingstone. Francois contested the election to be the Conservatives' prospective parliamentary candidate for Kensington and Chelsea in the 1999 by-election. The contest was won by Michael Portillo, who garnered 60% of the final ballot.

He was selected as the party's candidate for Rayleigh in the 2001 general election. Francois won the seat with a majority of 8,290. He made his maiden speech on 4 July 2001. Francois was re-elected in the 2005 general election with an increased majority of 14,726.

He served as a member of the Environmental Audit Select Committee for the duration of his first term in Parliament. He was promoted to become an Opposition Whip in 2003 by Michael Howard; to Shadow Economic Secretary in May 2004; and later to Shadow Paymaster General (10 May 2005 – 3 July 2007) scrutinising HMRC.

He was promoted to be Shadow Minister for Europe on 3 July 2007, and joined the Shadow Cabinet at the January 2009 reshuffle. As Shadow Minister for Europe Francois oversaw the Conservative Party's withdrawal from the EPP grouping in the European Parliament, the creation of the ECR grouping and the Conservatives' opposition in the House of Commons to the Treaty of Lisbon, which he spoke against on many occasions including on 5 March 2008 in the debate to pass the European Union (Amendment) Act 2008.

When the Rayleigh constituency was abolished, Francois was elected in the new seat of Rayleigh & Wickford in the 2010 general election. Francois won with a majority of 22,338 votes, 42.7%, receiving 57.8% of all the votes cast.

When the Conservatives and Liberal Democrats joined in a coalition government following the 2010 general election, he was appointed Vice-Chamberlain of the Household, a sinecure given to a Government Whip that entails being kept as 'captive' at Buckingham Palace when the Queen opens Parliament. He joined the Privy Council on 9 June 2010. In 2011, he was a member of the special Select Committee set up to scrutinise the Bill that became the Armed Forces Act 2011.

He was appointed Minister of State for Defence Personnel, Welfare and Veterans in the Ministry of Defence in September 2012. From October 2013 to May 2015, he was Minister of State with responsibility for the armed forces, cyber activity, and force generation.

At the 2015 general election, Francois was re-elected as the MP for Rayleigh and Wickford with a reduced majority of 17,230 votes. Following the election, he became Minister of State for Communities and Resilience and Minister for Portsmouth at the Department for Communities and Local Government.

Francois left the government after Theresa May was appointed prime minister, but she appointed him to conduct a review into the use of reserves in the Army.

At the 2017 general election, Francois was re-elected as the MP for Rayleigh and Wickford with an increased majority of 23,450 votes.

Since September 2017, Francois has sat on the Defence Select Committee and is a former member of the Administration Committee, the Committee of Selection, Defence Committee and Environmental Audit Committee. He is a vice-president of Conservative Friends of Poland.

In September 2019, Essex Police issued clarification on Francois' status, when he joined one of their patrols in a Rayleigh, Essex Wetherspoons pub in his capacity as the local MP. He appeared to be dressed as a uniformed police officer, including wearing a police issue stab vest. Essex Police said that they had wrongly issued the jacket to the MP and confirmed that Francois is not employed by them. They used the statement to add that they are however currently recruiting.

In 2019, Francois became one of the 28 so called Tory "Brexit Spartans" who voted against Theresa May's Brexit deal all three times it was put to the House of Commons.

At the 2019 general election, Francois was re-elected with an increased majority of exactly 31,000 and achieved 72.6% of the vote. In January 2020, he launched a crowdfunding bid with the StandUp4Brexit group to raise money for Big Ben to chime upon the UK's departure from the EU.

On 3 March 2020, Francois was announced as chair of the ERG, succeeding Steve Baker. In this capacity he wrote to Michel Barnier, head of the task force negotiating the post-Brexit relationship between the UK and the EU, a letter titled "A Missive from a Free Country". Barnier replied in an open letter.

In December 2021, Francois called on Secretary of State for Northern Ireland Brandon Lewis to resign for failing to come through with promised legislation related to veterans.

In November 2022, Labour MP Sarah Owen criticised Francois for using an "outdated and crass racial slur" in the House of Commons when he referred to Japanese people as "Japs". Francois used the term when asking a question on defence, saying: "Given the defence budget is likely to come under great pressure, why does it take BAE Systems eleven years to build a ship the Japs can build in four?" Francois later said he was complimenting the Japanese shipbuilding industry and used "Japs" as an abbreviation for Japanese.

Francois was again re-elected at the 2024 general election, with a decreased vote share of 37% and a decreased majority of 5,621.

== Personal life ==
Francois married Karen Thomas in Langdon Hills, Basildon, in June 2000. They divorced in 2006.

On 11 June 2022, Francois married Olivia Sanders, a NHS radiographer, borough councillor, and former Conservative Mayor of Brentwood.

Parliament of the United Kingdom
Preceded by Michael Clark	Member of Parliament for Rayleigh; 2001–2010	Constituency abolished
New constituency	Member of Parliament for Rayleigh and Wickford; 2010–present	Incumbent
Political offices
Preceded by Graham Brady	Shadow Minister for Europe; 2007–2010	Succeeded by Chris Bryant
Preceded by Helen Jones	Vice-Chamberlain of the Household; 2010–2012	Succeeded by Greg Knight
Other offices
Preceded by Steve Baker	Chair of the European Research Group; 2020–present	Incumbent
