= Rayleigh and Wickford =

UK Parliament constituency (since 2010)

Coordinates: 51.6°N 0.61°E

- County constituency for the House of Commons
- Interactive map of boundaries since 2024
- Location within the East of England
- County: Essex
- Electorate: 76,422 (March 2020)
- Major settlements: Hawkwell, Hockley, Rayleigh and Wickford

Current constituency
- Created: 2010
- Member of Parliament: Mark Francois (Conservative)
- Seats: One
- Created from: Rayleigh, Billericay

Rayleigh and Wickford is a constituency (Note: A county constituency (for the purposes of election expenses and type of returning officer)) represented in the House of Commons of the UK Parliament since its 2010 creation by Mark Francois, a Conservative. (Note: As with all constituencies, the constituency elects one Member of Parliament (MP) by the first past the post system of election at least every five years.) Francois had previously been MP for the predecessor constituency of Rayleigh from 2001 to 2010.

== Constituency profile ==
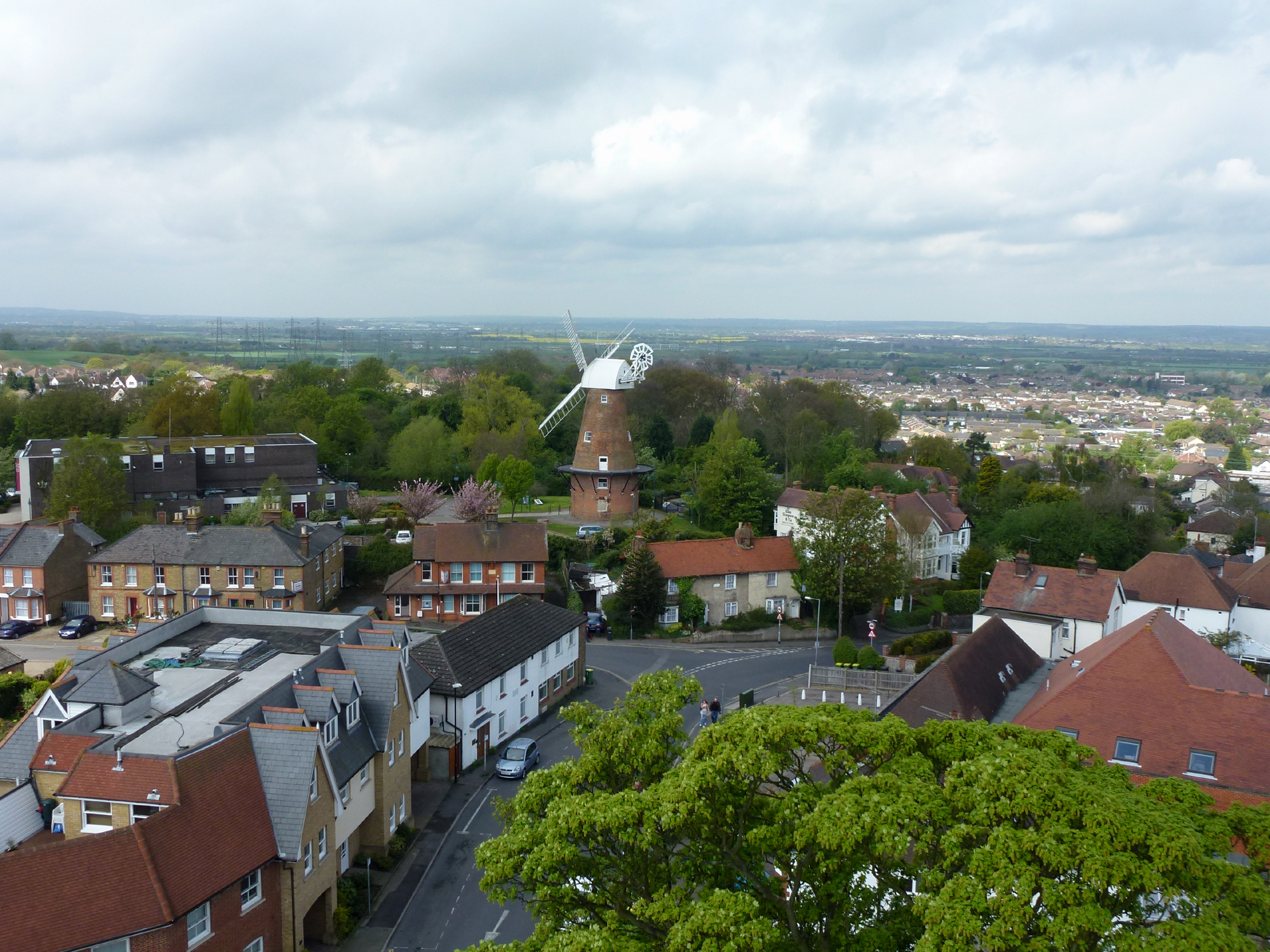
Rayleigh Windmill with the suburbs of Rayleigh in the background

Rayleigh and Wickford is a constituency in Essex in the East of England, covering parts of the Basildon and Rochford local government districts. It is named after its two main towns, Rayleigh and Wickford, of which Rayleigh is the largest with a population of around 34,000. Other settlements include the villages of Hullbridge, Hockley and Hawkwell and the northern suburbs of the town of Rochford.

This constituency covers the towns and villages lying close to the larger settlements of Southend-on-Sea and Basildon. Rayleigh is a historic market town that has undergone suburban development in the late 20th century, connecting it to the city of Southend. Wickford was traditionally an agricultural village until the arrival of the Great Eastern Railway in 1889. The constituency is mostly affluent, especially in Hockley, Hawkwell and the suburbs of Rayleigh, which fall within the top 10% least-deprived areas in England. Most residents live in detached or semi-detached homes with little social housing, and house prices are generally higher than the regional and UK averages.

Rayleigh and Wickford has an above-average retired population and a low proportion of young adults. Residents have high levels of income and homeownership and the child poverty rate is around half the UK-wide figure. Residents generally have low levels of education and a high proportion work in the business administration and construction sectors. The percentage claiming unemployment benefits is low. White people made up 95% of the population at the 2021 census.

At the local district council level, most of Rayleigh and the villages to its east are represented by Liberal Democrats and Wickford by localists. However, at the more recent district council and county council elections in 2026, all seats in the constituency were won by Reform UK. Voters in Rayleigh and Wickford strongly supported leaving the European Union in the 2016 referendum; an estimated 66% voted in favour of Brexit compared to the UK-wide figure of 52%.

== History ==
The seat was created for the 2010 general election following a review of the Parliamentary representation of Essex by the Boundary Commission for England. It was formed from the majority of the abolished constituency of Rayleigh, together with the town of Wickford, previously in the abolished constituency of Billericay.

== Boundaries ==
Map of boundaries 2010–2024

=== 2010–2024 ===
- The Borough of Basildon wards of Wickford Castledon, Wickford North, and Wickford Park
- The District of Rochford wards of Ashingdon and Canewdon, Downhall and Rawreth, Grange, Hawkwell North, Hawkwell South, Hawkwell West, Hockley Central, Hockley North, Hockley West, Hullbridge, Lodge, Rayleigh Central, Sweyne Park, Trinity, Wheatley and Whitehouse

=== Current ===
Further to the 2023 review of Westminster constituencies, which came into effect for the 2024 general election, the composition of the constituency is as follows (as they existed on 1 December 2020):

- The Borough of Basildon wards of: Wickford Castledon; Wickford North; Wickford Park.^{1}
- The District of Rochford wards of: Downhall & Rawreth; Hawkwell East; Hawkwell West; Hockley; Hockley & Ashingdon; Hullbridge; Lodge; Sweyne Park & Grange; Trinity; Wheatley.

Minor loss of sparsely populated area in the east of the constituency to the newly named Southend East and Rochford seat.

^{1} Following a local government boundary review which came into effect in May 2024, the contents in the Borough of Basildon now comprise the Wickford North and Wickford Park wards and the part of the Castledon & Crouch ward situated in the civil parish of Wickford.

== Members of Parliament ==
Rayleigh and Billericay prior to 2010

Election	Member	Party
2010	Mark Francois	Conservative

== Elections ==
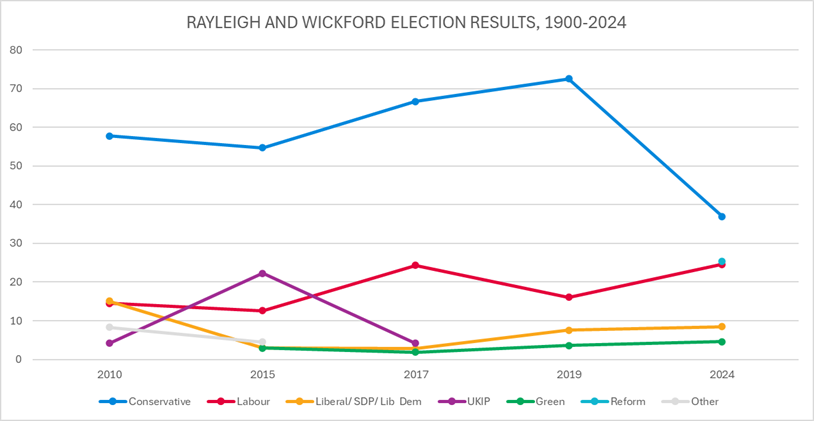
Election results 2010–2024

=== Elections in the 2020s ===
General election 2024: Rayleigh and Wickford
Party	Candidate	Votes	%	±%
Conservative	Mark Francois	17,756	37.0	−35.9
Reform	Grant Randall	12,135	25.3	New
Labour	James Hedges	11,823	24.6	+8.9
Liberal Democrats	Stewart Mott	4,068	8.5	+0.8
Green	Christopher Taylor	2,196	4.6	+0.9
Majority		5,621	11.7	−45.6
Turnout		47,978	62.7	−6.6
Registered electors		76,576		
Conservative hold		Swing	−30.6	

=== Elections in the 2010s ===
2019 notional result
Party	Vote	%
Conservative	38,652	72.9
Labour	8,304	15.7
Liberal Democrats	4,081	7.7
Green	1,960	3.7
Turnout	52,997	69.3
Electorate	76,422	

General election 2019: Rayleigh and Wickford
Party	Candidate	Votes	%	±%
Conservative	Mark Francois	39,864	72.6	+5.9
Labour	David Flack	8,864	16.1	−8.2
Liberal Democrats	Ron Tindall	4,171	7.6	+4.8
Green	Paul Thorogood	2,002	3.6	+1.7
Majority		31,000	56.5	+14.1
Turnout		54,901	69.5	−0.9
Conservative hold		Swing	+7.0	

General election 2017: Rayleigh and Wickford
Party	Candidate	Votes	%	±%
Conservative	Mark Francois	36,914	66.7	+12.0
Labour	Mark Daniels	13,464	24.3	+11.7
UKIP	Peter Smith	2,326	4.2	−18.1
Liberal Democrats	Ron Tindall	1,557	2.8	−0.2
Green	Paul Hill	1,062	1.9	−1.0
Majority		23,450	42.4	+10.0
Turnout		55,323	70.4	+2.1
Conservative hold		Swing	+0.2	

General election 2015: Rayleigh and Wickford
Party	Candidate	Votes	%	±%
Conservative	Mark Francois	29,088	54.7	−3.1
UKIP	John Hayter	11,858	22.3	+18.1
Labour	David Hough	6,705	12.6	−1.9
Independent	Linda Kendall	2,418	4.5	New
Liberal Democrats	Mike Pitt	1,622	3.0	−12.1
Green	Sarah Yapp	1,529	2.9	New
Majority		17,230	32.4	−10.3
Turnout		53,220	68.3	+2.4
Conservative hold		Swing	−10.6	

General election 2010: Rayleigh and Wickford
Party	Candidate	Votes	%	±%
Conservative	Mark Francois*	30,257	57.8	+3.9
Liberal Democrats	Susan Gaszczak	7,919	15.1	−0.3
Labour	Michael Le Surf	7,577	14.5	−12.0
English Democrat	John Hayter	2,219	4.2	New
UKIP	Tino Callaghan	2,211	4.2	+0.1
BNP	Tony Evennett	2,160	4.1	New
Majority		22,338	42.7	+15.3
Turnout		52,343	69.1	
Conservative hold		Swing	+8.0	

* Served as an MP in the 2005–2010 Parliament

== See also ==
- List of parliamentary constituencies in Essex
- List of parliamentary constituencies in the East of England (region)
