= Scottish government economy directorates =

The Scottish government economy directorates were a set of directorates within the Scottish government, the executive arm of the devolved government of Scotland. The directorates were headed by Dr Andrew Goudie, who also acted as the chief economic adviser to the Scottish government (Goudie retired in 2011 and joined Strathclyde University). The directorates were responsible for transport, sustainable development and planning. In 2010, the transport directorate merged with Transport Scotland, an Executive Agency of the Scottish Government and accountable to Scottish Ministers.
