= Matt Hancock =

British politician (born 1978)

The Right Honourable Matt Hancock
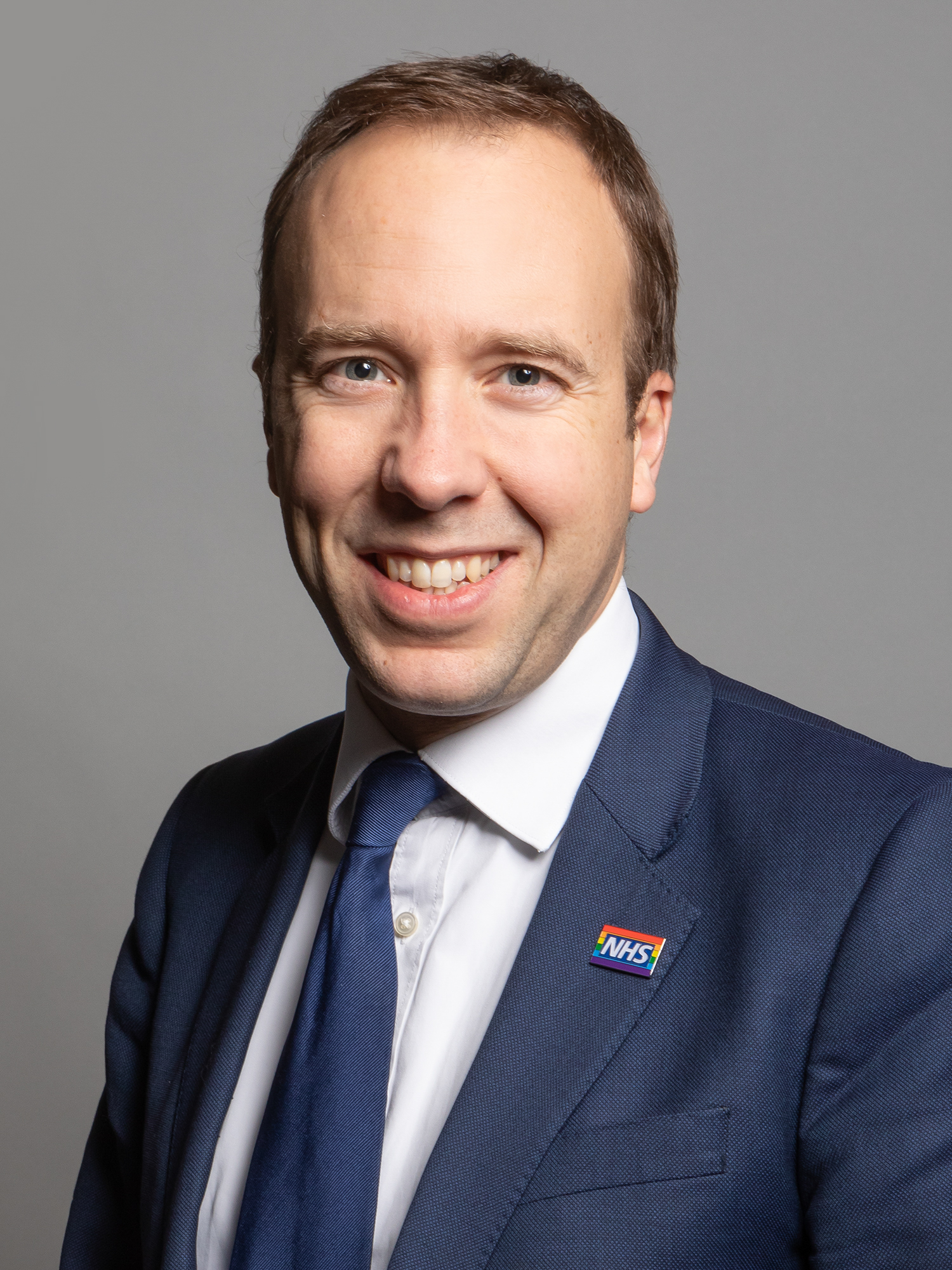
- Official portrait, 2020

Secretary of State for Health and Social Care
- In office 9 July 2018 – 26 June 2021
- Prime Minister: Theresa May; Boris Johnson
- Preceded by: Jeremy Hunt
- Succeeded by: Sajid Javid

Secretary of State for Digital, Culture, Media and Sport
- In office 8 January 2018 – 9 July 2018
- Prime Minister: Theresa May
- Preceded by: Karen Bradley
- Succeeded by: Jeremy Wright

Minister for the Cabinet Office Paymaster General
- In office 11 May 2015 – 14 July 2016
- Prime Minister: David Cameron
- Preceded by: Francis Maude
- Succeeded by: Ben Gummer
Junior ministerial offices
Minister of State for Digital and Culture
In office 15 July 2016 – 8 January 2018
Prime Minister	Theresa May
Preceded by	Ed Vaizey
Succeeded by	Margot James
Minister of State for Business and Enterprise
In office 15 July 2014 – 11 May 2015
Prime Minister	David Cameron
Preceded by	Michael Fallon
Succeeded by	Anna Soubry
Minister of State for Energy
In office 15 July 2014 – 11 May 2015
Prime Minister	David Cameron
Preceded by	Michael Fallon
Succeeded by	Andrea Leadsom
Minister of State for Portsmouth
In office 15 July 2014 – 11 May 2015
Prime Minister	David Cameron
Preceded by	Michael Fallon
Succeeded by	Mark Francois
Minister of State for Skills and Enterprise (Note: Parliamentary Under-Secretary of State for Skills from 6 September 2012 to 7 October 2013.)
In office 6 September 2012 – 15 July 2014
Prime Minister	David Cameron
Preceded by	John Hayes
Succeeded by	Nick Boles

Member of Parliament for West Suffolk
- In office 6 May 2010 – 30 May 2024
- Preceded by: Richard Spring
- Succeeded by: Nick Timothy

Personal details
- Born: Matthew John David Hancock; 2 October 1978 (age 48) Chester, Cheshire, England
- Party: Conservative (Note: Whip suspended 1 November 2022 to 22 May 2024)
- Spouse: Martha Hoyer Millar (m. 2006; sep. 2021)
- Domestic partner: Gina Coladangelo (2021–present)
- Children: 3
- Education: Exeter College, Oxford (BA); Christ's College, Cambridge (MPhil)
- Website: matt-hancock.com
- Matt Hancock's voice Hancock on the National Health Service (NHS); Recorded 4 October 2020

Matthew John David Hancock (born 2 October 1978) is a British former politician who served as Minister for the Cabinet Office and Paymaster General from 2015 to 2016, Secretary of State for Digital, Culture, Media and Sport from January to July 2018, and Secretary of State for Health and Social Care from 2018 to 2021. He was Member of Parliament (MP) for West Suffolk from 2010 to 2024. He is a member of the Conservative Party.

Hancock was an economist at the Bank of England before serving as a senior economic adviser and later as chief of staff to George Osborne. Hancock was first elected as an MP for West Suffolk at the 2010 election.

In Parliament, Hancock served as a junior minister at the Department for Business, Innovation and Skills from 2012 to 2015 and was the United Kingdom Anti-Corruption Champion from 2014 to 2015. He attended David Cameron's cabinet as Minister for the Cabinet Office and Paymaster General from 2015 to 2016. After Theresa May became prime minister following Cameron's resignation, Hancock was moved to the post of Minister of State for Digital and Culture. He was promoted to May's cabinet as Secretary of State for Digital, Culture, Media and Sport. In July 2018, after Jeremy Hunt became Foreign Secretary, Hancock replaced him as Secretary of State for Health and Social Care. After May's resignation, Hancock stood in the Conservative Party leadership election to replace her, but withdrew shortly after the first ballot and endorsed Boris Johnson. After Johnson became prime minister, Hancock kept his position as health secretary.

Hancock's time as health secretary was marked by the COVID-19 pandemic, and he played a prominent role in the government's response to it. He oversaw efforts to procure supplies needed, but the lack of a competitive tendering process for some contracts proved controversial. He expanded COVID-19 testing and tracing and also oversaw the early stage of the UK's COVID-19 vaccination programme. In June 2021, it was shown that he had breached COVID-19 social distancing restrictions by kissing and embracing Gina Coladangelo in his office. She was a director at the Department of Health and Social Care (DHSC), and Hancock was having an extramarital affair with her. Following this, Hancock resigned as health secretary and returned to the backbenches. He was succeeded by Sajid Javid.

In November 2022, Hancock had the party whip suspended after announcing he would appear as a contestant in the twenty-second series of the survival reality television show I'm a Celebrity...Get Me Out of Here!, in which he finished in third place. He did not seek re-election as an MP at the 2024 general election.

== Early life and education ==
Matthew Hancock was born on 2 October 1978 in Chester, Cheshire, to Michael Hancock and Shirley Hills, who had a software business. He has an older sister and a brother.

Hancock attended Farndon County Primary School, in Farndon, Cheshire, and then was privately educated at the King's School, Chester. He took A-levels in Maths, Physics, Computing, and Economics. He later studied computing at the further education college, West Cheshire College. Hancock then studied at the University of Oxford where he was an undergraduate at Exeter College, and graduated with a first class degree in Philosophy, Politics and Economics (PPE). He later earned a Master of Philosophy degree in economics from the University of Cambridge, where he was a postgraduate student at Christ's College. He was diagnosed with dyslexia at university. Hancock became a member of the Conservative Party in 1999.

== Early career ==
After university, Hancock briefly worked for his family's computer software company, Border Business Systems, and for a backbench Conservative MP, before moving to London to work as an economist at the Bank of England, specialising in the housing market. In 2005, he was an economic adviser to the Shadow Chancellor of the Exchequer, George Osborne, later becoming Osborne's chief of staff.

== Parliamentary career ==
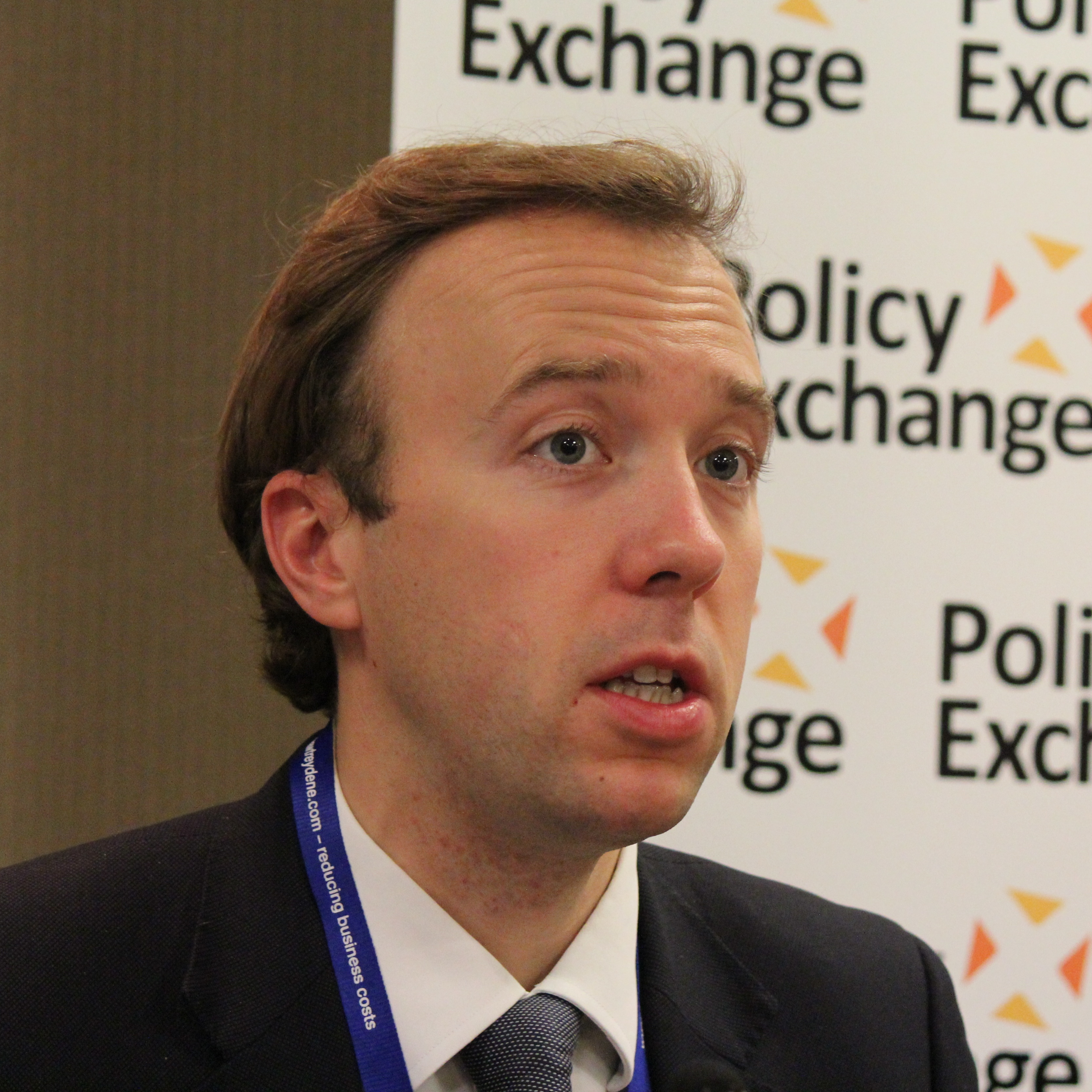
Hancock as Minister of State in October 2013

Hancock was selected as the Conservative candidate for West Suffolk in January 2010. He narrowly won the contest, defeating Natalie Elphicke (a solicitor who later became MP for Dover), by 88 votes to 81 in the final ballot. At the 2010 general election, Hancock was elected as MP for West Suffolk with 50.6% of the vote and a majority of 13,050.

In June 2010, Hancock was elected to the Public Accounts Committee. He served on this committee until November 2012. Hancock also served on the Standards and Privileges Committee from October 2010 to December 2012.

In 2011, Hancock became a member of the Free Enterprise Group, a group of Thatcherite Conservatives co-founded by Liz Truss. In January 2013, he was accused of dishonesty by Daybreak presenter, Matt Barbet, after claiming he had been excluded from a discussion about apprentices after turning up "just 30 seconds late". Hancock acknowledged on social media that he was running late, but said he turned up ahead of time for the interview and was unfairly blocked from going on set by producers. Barbet said Hancock knew he was "much more than a minute late" and he should have arrived half an hour beforehand to prepare for the interview.

In October 2013, Hancock joined the Department for Business, Innovation and Skills as the Minister of State for Skills and Enterprise.

In June 2014, Hancock, in his role as a minister, encouraged employers to become involved in offering more apprenticeships, allowing young people to learn and earn simultaneously.

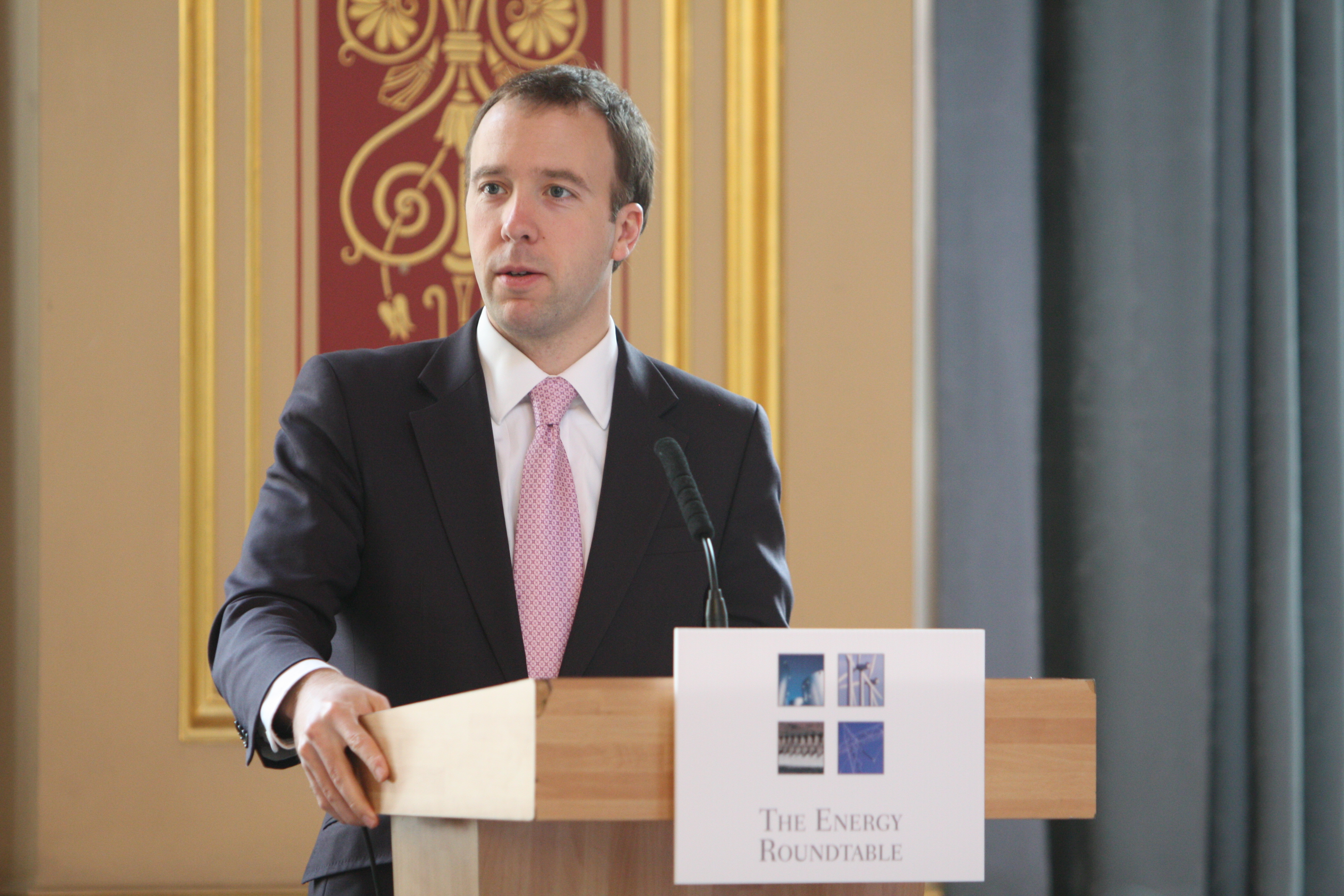
Hancock speaking at the 2014 Canada Europe Energy Summit

On 15 July 2014, Hancock was appointed to the position of Minister of State for Business and Enterprise. On 27 July, he announced protection from fracking for National Parks, seen as a method of reducing anger in Conservative constituencies ahead of the election. Interviewed on the BBC Radio 4 Today programme, he rejected the suggestion that fracking was highly unpopular but he was unable to name any village that backed it.

Hancock served as Minister of State for Energy from 2014 to 2015. In this role he was criticised for hiring a private jet with senior diplomatic officials to fly back from a climate conference in Aberdeen, where he signed a deal with Mexican President Enrique Peña Nieto to use British expertise in Mexico. A Department of Energy and Climate Change (DECC) spokesman said the chartered flight was organised to fit around diary commitments, and the conference was not about climate change, but it was a visit to a university and discussion about investment. Hancock was later criticised for accepting money from a key backer of climate change denial organisation, Global Warming Policy Foundation.

In October 2014, he apologised after retweeting a poem suggesting that the Labour Party was "full of queers", describing his actions as a "total accident".

At the 2015 general election, Hancock was re-elected as MP for West Suffolk with an increased vote share of 52.2% and an increased majority of 14,984.

Hancock became Minister for the Cabinet Office and Paymaster General on 11 May 2015. Hancock launched a new social mobility drive to promote diversity within the civil service, outlining his vision in a speech in February 2016. He led David Cameron's "earn or learn" taskforce which aimed to have every young person working or studying from April 2017. He announced that jobless 18 to 21-year-olds would be required to do work experience as well as looking for jobs, or face losing their benefits.

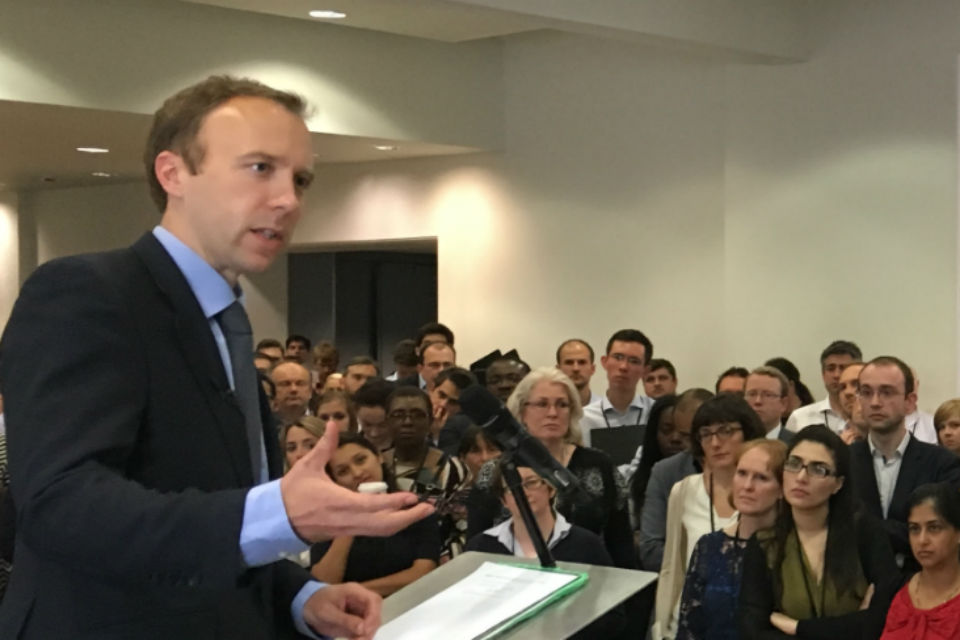
Hancock addressing civil servants in the Cabinet Office

In the 2016 UK referendum on EU membership, Hancock supported the UK remaining within the EU.

Hancock was again re-elected at the snap 2017 general election with an increased vote share of 61.2% and an increased majority of 17,063. He was again re-elected at the 2019 general election with an increased vote share of 65.8% and an increased majority of 23,194.

=== Secretary of State for Digital, Culture, Media and Sport ===
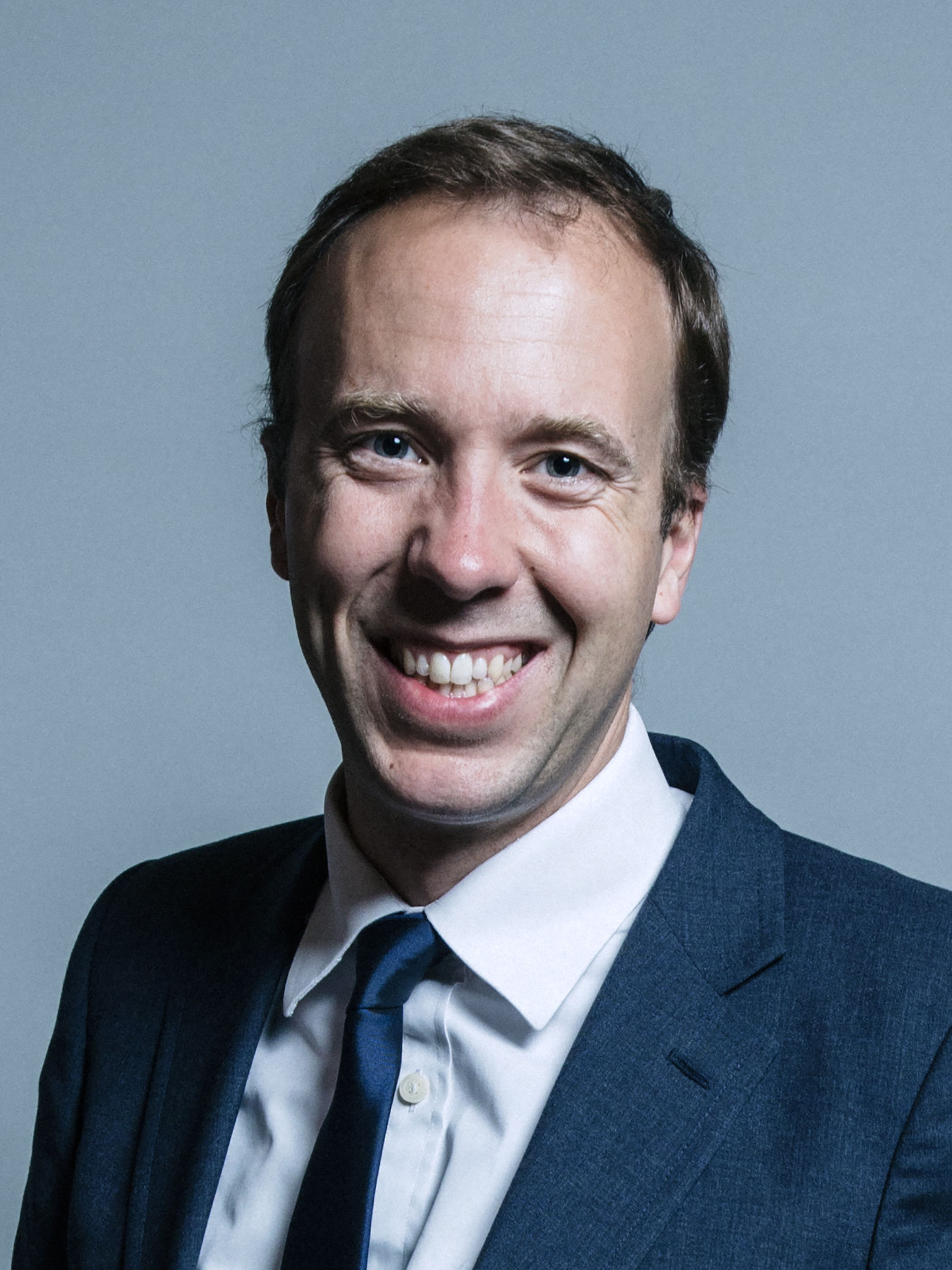
Official portrait of Hancock as MP, 2017

Hancock moved to the Department for Culture, Media and Sport as the Minister of State for Digital and Culture on 15 July 2016 after Theresa May became prime minister. As minister for digital policy, Hancock in June 2017 recommitted to a "full fibre" digital policy. This promised that 97% of the UK would enjoy "superfast broadband" at speeds of at least 24 megabits per second by 2020.

In August 2017, Hancock oversaw the strengthening of UK data protection law. As Digital Minister he announced people would have more control over their personal data and be better protected in the digital age.

On 8 January 2018, Hancock was appointed Secretary of State for Digital, Culture, Media and Sport in Theresa May's 2018 cabinet reshuffle, succeeding Karen Bradley. On his first day in the role he criticised the BBC for the amounts of pay its foreign journalists received, and said that some men at the corporation were paid "far more than equivalent public servants".

In early 2018, Hancock was the first MP to launch his own mobile app, eponymously named the "Matt Hancock MP App", which functioned as a social network for him to communicate with his constituents and give people updates in relation to his cabinet role. The head of privacy rights group Big Brother Watch called the app a "fascinating comedy of errors", after the app was found to collect its users' photographs, friend details, check-ins, and contact information. Hancock said his app collected data once consent was granted by the user. The app was eventually shut down at the beginning of 2023.

In May 2018, as Media Secretary, Hancock confirmed the highest stake on fixed odds betting terminals would be cut to £2, after Prime Minister May sided with him over the issue.

=== Secretary of State for Health and Social Care ===
==== May Ministry ====
Following Jeremy Hunt's appointment as Secretary of State for Foreign and Commonwealth Affairs, Hancock was appointed Secretary of State for Health and Social Care for England on 9 July 2018.

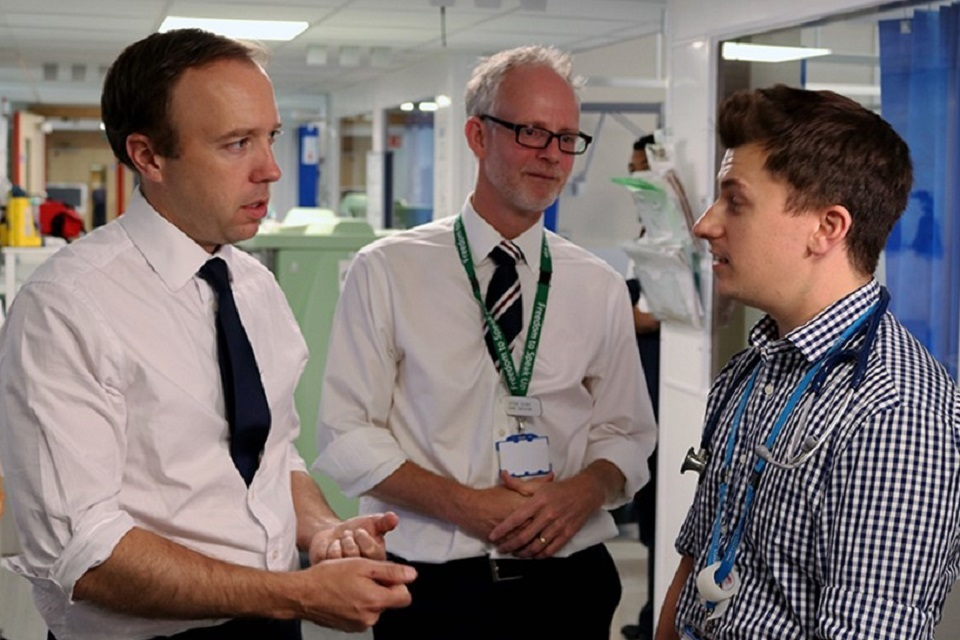
Hancock talking to hospital staff in 2018

In November 2018, Hancock was criticised after appearing to endorse a mobile phone health app marketed by the subscription health service company Babylon in the Evening Standard. Babylon allegedly sponsored the newspaper article. The Labour MP Justin Madders wrote to Theresa May accusing Hancock of repeatedly endorsing the products of a company that receives NHS funds for patients it treats, which contravenes ministerial guidelines. The ministerial code includes that ministers should not "normally accept invitations to act as patrons of, or otherwise offer support to, pressure groups or organisations dependent in whole or in part on Government funding".

In April 2019, Hancock, who had previously said the NHS would face "no privatisation on my watch", was criticised by Labour for allowing 21 NHS contracts worth £127 million to be tendered.

==== 2019 Conservative Party leadership candidacy ====
After Theresa May announced her intention to resign as prime minister on 24 May 2019, Hancock announced his intention to stand for the Conservative Party leadership. During this campaign, Hancock opposed the prorogation of Parliament to deliver Brexit and called on his fellow leadership candidates to join him on 6 June 2019. He proposed a televised debate with other candidates. He withdrew from the race on 14 June shortly after winning only twenty votes on the first ballot. Following his withdrawal, he endorsed Boris Johnson for the role.

==== Early Johnson premiership ====
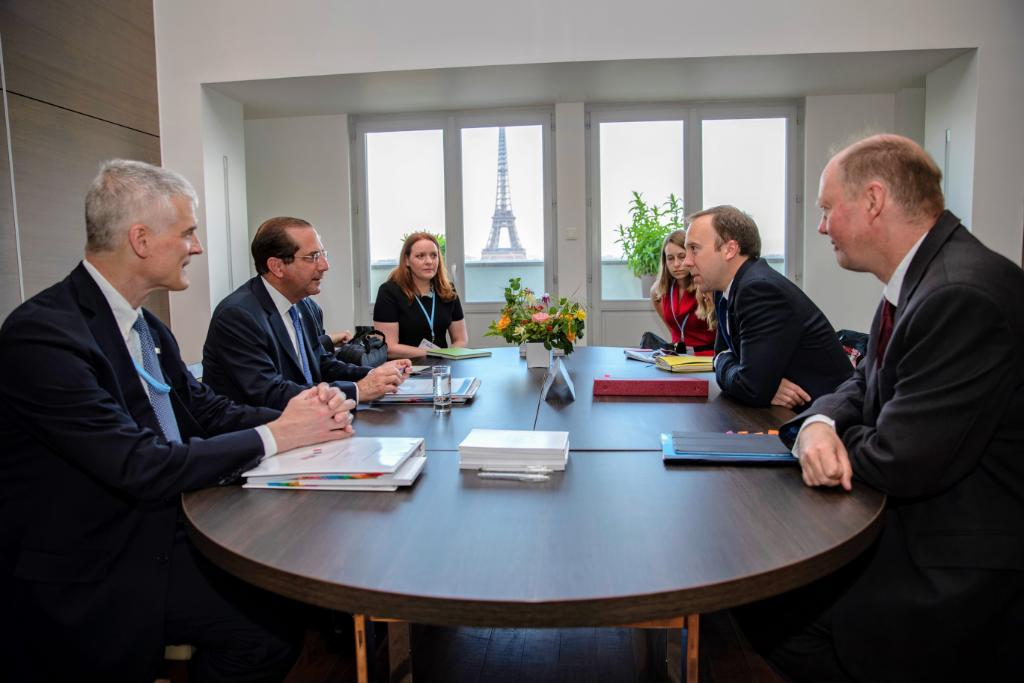
Hancock meets with US Secretary of Health Alex Azar in 2019

Hancock continued in his role as Health Secretary in Prime Minister Boris Johnson's cabinet. He supported the prorogation of parliament in 2019 by Johnson which he had previously opposed while running for the Conservative leadership. On 24 September the Supreme Court ruled that the prorogation was unlawful.

In a September 2019 Channel 4 News interview, Hancock was asked to respond to allegations that at a private lunch in 1999, Johnson had groped the leg of journalist Charlotte Edwardes under a table. Edwardes also claimed that Johnson did the same to another woman at the same private lunch. In his reply to the Channel 4 News question, Hancock said of Charlotte Edwardes, "I know Charlotte well and I entirely trust what she has to say. I know her and I know her to be trustworthy", a view shared by fellow Conservative MP Amber Rudd. Both Johnson and anonymous Downing Street officials denied the allegation.

In October 2019, Hancock was lobbied by former Prime Minister David Cameron and financier Lex Greensill to introduce a payment scheme. Hancock was implicated in the Greensill scandal as the payment scheme was later rolled out within the NHS.

In November 2019, Hancock publicly apologised to Bethany, a teenager diagnosed with autism, for being kept in solitary confinement in various psychiatric facilities. Hancock apologised "for the things that have gone wrong in her care" and said her case in particular was "incredibly difficult and complex", calling Bethany's case "heart-rending" and saying that he had insisted on "a case review of every single person in those conditions."

===== COVID-19 pandemic =====
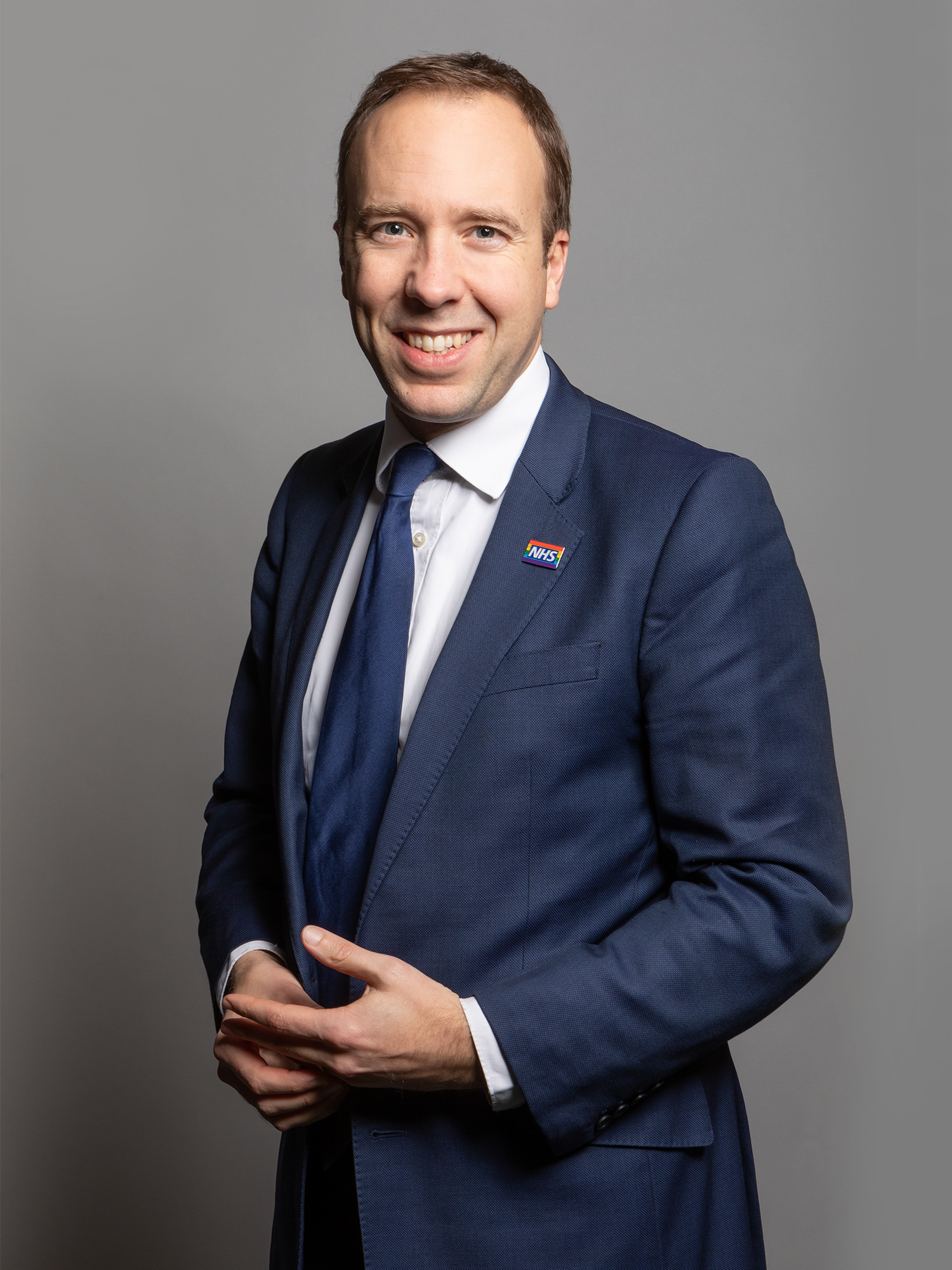
Official portrait of Hancock as Health Secretary, 2020

On 31 January 2020, COVID-19 was confirmed to have spread to the UK. Hancock said the Government was considering "some quite significant actions that would have social and economic disruption". After the government gave strict social distancing advice which was defied by large numbers of people, Hancock took a stronger line than the prime minister on condemning those still socialising in groups and derided them as being "very selfish". The Government later implemented legislation banning such groups from forming.

On 27 March 2020, along with Boris Johnson, Hancock himself tested positive for COVID-19. He stayed in self-isolation with mild symptoms for seven days, before delivering an update on COVID-19 testing targets and on Government plans to write off £13.4 billion of NHS debt.

In April 2020, Hancock was criticised when it emerged that the target he had set for 100,000 daily COVID-19 tests had been met only by changing the method of counting, to include up to 40,000 home test kits which had been sent, but not yet completed. This change was challenged by the UK Statistics Authority and labelled a "Potemkin testing regime".

Doctors' groups maintained that they helped deliver 45,000 masks to hospitals that did not have a sufficient supply at the beginning of the pandemic and that families of healthcare workers who died from COVID-19 had expressed concerns about the protection they got. Early in the pandemic NHS staff were photographed with poorly fitting personal protective equipment (PPE) and some made improvised gowns for themselves from bin bags. Doctors and MPs criticised Hancock for denying there was a problem.

On 5 April 2020, Hancock warned that all outdoor exercise in England could be banned in response to COVID-19 if people did not follow social distancing rules. He said: "So my message is really clear. If you don't want us to have to take the step to ban exercise of all forms outside of your own home then you've got to follow the rules and the vast majority of people are following the rules."

Hancock received criticism from journalists for perceived sexism after suggesting on 5 May 2020 that Labour MP and shadow health minister Rosena Allin-Khan change the "tone" of her comments. Allin-Khan, a doctor, had stated in Parliament that a lack of testing was costing lives and Hancock suggested she should "take a leaf out of the Shadow Secretary of State's [Jonathan Ashworth's] book in terms of tone".

On 15 August 2020, The Daily Telegraph reported that Hancock was to merge Public Health England and NHS Test and Trace into a new body called the National Institute for Health Protection, modelled on the Robert Koch Institute. The new body, renamed as the UK Health Security Agency, was set up before autumn amid "a feared surge in coronavirus cases".

On 11 October 2020, Hancock denied breaching a 10 pm drinking curfew in the Smoking Room bar in the House of Commons, put in place because of the pandemic. Eight days later, the Daily Mirror published a photograph of him riding in his chauffeur-driven car without wearing a mask.

On 2 December 2020, Hancock incorrectly claimed that the MHRA's fast approval of the first COVID-19 vaccine was possible because of Brexit. The MHRA stated that it had followed an expeditious procedure allowed under EU legislation which was still in force in the UK during the transition period.

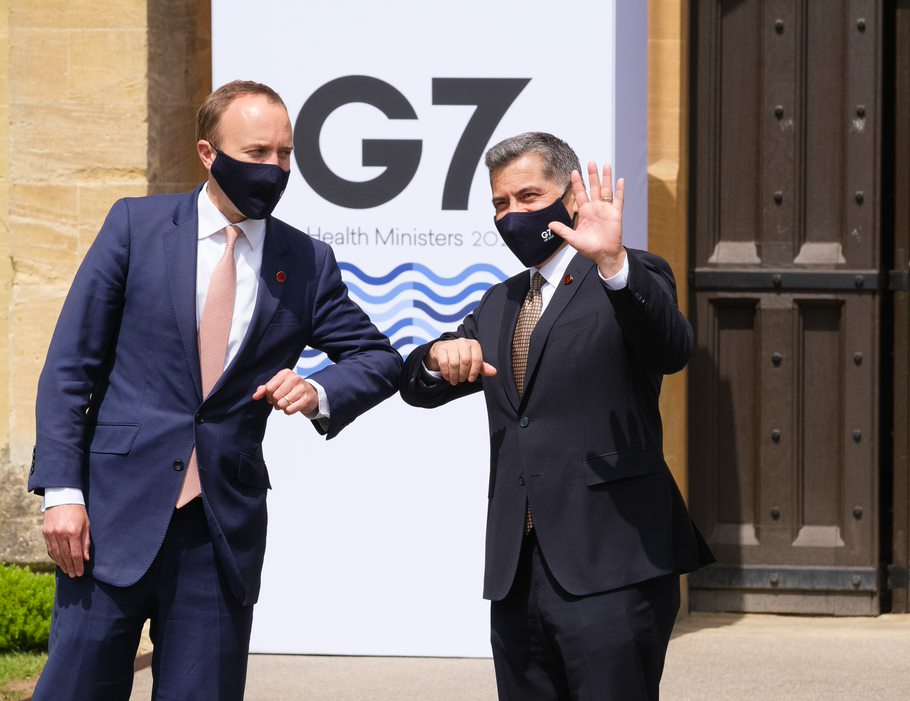
Hancock and US Secretary of Health Xavier Becerra at G7 Health ministers' meeting, 2021

In January 2021, shopping vouchers for families in need were reintroduced. On Good Morning Britain, Hancock praised the Government for reintroducing the scheme, despite being repeatedly reminded by Piers Morgan that he had opposed it in Parliament.

On 19 February 2021, after a legal challenge by the Good Law Project, a High Court judge ruled that Hancock had acted unlawfully by handing out PPE contracts without publishing details in a timely manner. A ruling released by the High Court stated: "There is now no dispute that, in a substantial number of cases, the secretary of state breached his legal obligation to publish Contract Award Notices (CANs) within 30 days of the award of contracts." The details were published within 47 days.

In April 2021, it was reported that Hancock had been given 20% of shares in Topwood Limited, a firm based in Wrexham which is owned by his sister and other close family members. The company specialises in secure storage, scanning and shredding of documents. It won a place on a "procurement framework" listing to provide services to NHS England in 2019, as well as contracts with NHS Wales. There has been no suggestion that Hancock intervened in the normal processes, and in April 2021, the company had not earned anything through the framework. Lord Geidt later produced a report on ministerial interests saying that the awarding of the contract to Topwood could be seen to "represent a conflict of interest" that should have been declared. Hancock responded by saying: "I did not know about the framework decision, and so I do not think I could reasonably have been expected to declare it."

In May 2021, the former Downing Street chief adviser Dominic Cummings claimed, "tens of thousands of people died who didn't need to die" during the early days of the COVID-19 pandemic due to what he claimed to be "criminal, disgraceful behaviour" within Downing Street under the supervision of Hancock. Cummings also said that Hancock should have been fired as Health Secretary for "15 to 20" different things. Following his testimony, YouGov noted that more people in the general public thought Hancock should resign than stay in his post, despite questions over the accuracy of Cummings's statements. Prime Minister Johnson defended Hancock and his decision-making.

Over 20,000 care home residents who were elderly or disabled had died from COVID-19 in England and Wales. The High Court of Justice ruled in a case against Boris Johnson's government on 27 April 2022 that discharging people into care homes without testing them was unlawful. Lord Justice Bean and Neil Garnham ruled that the policies were not lawful since they disregarded the risk from non-symptomatic transmission of COVID-19 to elderly and vulnerable residents. The judges stated that in spite of "growing awareness" about the risk of asymptomatic transmission during March 2020, there was no evidence Hancock had taken the risk to care home residents into account. The judges stated: "The document could, for example, have said that where an asymptomatic patient (...) is admitted to a care home, he or she should, so far as practicable, be kept apart from other residents for up to 14 days. (...) there is no evidence that this question was considered by the Secretary of State."

===== Resignation =====
On 25 June 2021, it was revealed that Hancock had breached COVID-19 social distancing restrictions with Gina Coladangelo, an adviser in the DHSC with whom he was having an extramarital affair, after CCTV images of him kissing and embracing her in his Whitehall office on 6 May were published in The Sun newspaper. The Government's guidelines allowed intimate contact with people from a different household only from 17 May. The previous year, Hancock had failed to declare he had appointed Coladangelo as an unpaid adviser at the department and later to a paid non-executive director role on its board, for which Coladangelo would earn between £15,000 and £20,000 annually from public funds. Coladangelo became a close friend of Hancock after meeting him while they were both undergraduates at Oxford University.

Later that day on 25 June, Hancock said that he had "breached the social distancing guidelines in these circumstances" and apologised for "letting people down". Boris Johnson later said that he accepted the apology and considered the matter "closed". However, Hancock resigned on the evening of 26 June, stating "those of us who make these rules have got to stick by them", and he had not because of his "breaking the guidance". He was replaced as Health Secretary the same day by Sajid Javid.

Former Cabinet ministers Alan Johnson and Rory Stewart both said there had never been cameras in their offices during their time in Government, with Johnson saying: "I could never understand why there was a camera in the Secretary of State's office. There was never a camera in my office when I was Health Secretary or in any of the other five Cabinet positions." It was reported that the CCTV footage was leaked by a DHSC employee who opposed the Government's lockdown restrictions, and on 27 June it was confirmed that an internal investigation was undertaken by the department to find the culprit, for fear of future CCTV footage being leaked to states hostile to the UK, for the purposes of blackmail.

News of the scandal was met with a mixture of public anger and ridicule. The Covid-19 Bereaved Families for Justice group warned that Hancock's actions could undermine adherence to COVID-19 restrictions, similar to the Dominic Cummings scandal. Amanda Milling, Chairman of the Conservative Party, suggested that Hancock's affair was a factor in the Conservative Party's failure to win the Batley and Spen by-election on 1 July 2021.

In July 2021, the Information Commissioner's Office established an inquiry into the leak in the CCTV images. On 29 July, the council of the second largest town in his constituency, Newmarket, passed a no-confidence vote against Hancock as its MP. Mayor Michael Jefferys cast the necessary vote to pass the motion.

According to the Independent, Hancock faced severe criticism due to a shortage of PPE in the NHS early in the pandemic, the award of contracts for supplying masks and the decision to transfer elderly patients to care homes without COVID-19 testing. Hancock defended his handling of the pandemic and stated: "We suddenly needed masses more PPE and so did everybody else in the world."

=== Return to the backbenches ===
On 12 October 2021, Hancock announced his appointment as the United Nations Economic Commission for Africa special representative for financial innovation and climate change, an unpaid position advising the Commission on the African economy's recovery from the COVID-19 pandemic. Four days later, the United Nations announced on 16 October that the offer had been rescinded.

During the 2022 Russian invasion of Ukraine, Hancock welcomed seven Ukrainian refugees into his family home in Suffolk in May 2022 through the "Homes for Ukraine" scheme.

In December 2022, he announced that he would not seek re-election at the next general election.

In June 2023, Hancock was told to apologise to Parliament after being found to have breached the MPs Code of Conduct, by committing a “minor breach” of Commons rules by sending an unsolicited letter to the parliamentary standards commissioner in an attempt to influence the commissioner's investigation into fellow Conservative MP Steve Brine.

He did not seek re-election as an MP at the 2024 general election.

=== Pandemic Diaries ===
In April 2022, it was announced that Hancock would publish his diaries during the COVID-19 pandemic called Pandemic Diaries with Biteback Publishing, cowritten by Isabel Oakeshott. The royalties were planned to be donated to NHS charities. The book was to be released in December 2022.

The book was not based on a diary, but was written after the fact. It was based on Hancock's recollections, as well his records of communications. It dismissed allegations that moving patients into care homes caused deaths, arguing that the staff in care homes were the vector of disease. The book was also critical of Dominic Cummings.

Reviews commented that the book presented too positive an image, making Hancock seem unduly prescient with the benefit of hindsight, arguing there may be elements of revisionism.

Gaby Hinsliff reviewing in The Guardian said that there were kernels of truth about how politicians make decisions in the account but comments on how the book was written with the benefit of hindsight, allowing Hancock to make himself seem prescient. Rod Dacombe writing in the i, said that the diary was absurd and devoid of literary flair. Adam Wagner, writing in Prospect magazine, said that the book had a focus on score settling and self-aggrandisation but that there were some genuine revelations. He noted that more will be known when the UK Covid-19 Inquiry reports. Wagner argues Hancock's removal of exceptions for protest from proposed lockdown regulations on the grounds that protests could undermine public trust in measures and his criticism of protestors in the book are suggestive that protests were banned based on the political views of protestors, which Wagner thinks would likely constitute government overreach.

Oakeshott leaked some of the private WhatsApp messages she had access to in a Daily Telegraph article published in February 2023. The Telegraph published a series of articles about these leaks in a series called The Lockdown Files. One message from April 2020 suggests Hancock told aides that professor Chris Whitty had done "an "evidence review" and recommended "testing of all going into care homes, and segregation whilst awaiting result". Hancock allegedly stated this was a "good positive step". Later, Hancock allegedly stated he would rather avoid a commitment to test all people going into care homes from the community and "just commit to test & isolate ALL going into care from hospital". A spokesman for Hancock said, "These stolen messages have been doctored to create a false story that Matt rejected clinical advice on care home testing".

=== Bridgen v Hancock libel case ===
In January 2023, Andrew Bridgen MP claimed a tweet by Hancock defamed him by labeling his vaccine criticism as antisemitic. The High Court partially struck out Bridgen's case in March 2024 and ordered him to pay £40,000 in costs to Hancock. In June 2024, Justice Collins Rice ruled Hancock's tweet was an expression of opinion, not fact, but Bridgen could amend his claim. in April 2025, the High Court, ruled that Bridgen, could amend his case and Hancock was ordered to pay £18,000 costs. On 20 May 2026, Hancock appealed the earlier decision, at the Court of Appeal and is awaiting their ruling.

== Appearance on I'm a Celebrity... Get Me Out of Here! ==
Hancock was a contestant on the 22nd series of the reality television series I'm a Celebrity... Get Me Out of Here!, filmed while Parliament was in session. An agreement was reached with the show's producers that Hancock could communicate with his constituency team throughout his time in the jungle if necessary. Explaining his decision to participate in the show, Hancock said, "I want to raise the profile of my dyslexia campaign to help every dyslexic child unleash their potential — even if it means taking an unusual route to get there, via the Australian jungle"! Hancock also said that he was driven by the intention to display his "human side" and to use reality TV as a means to convey "important messages to the masses". It was reported that Hancock would be paid £400,000, which was "one of the largest show fees" paid to a contestant. His spokesman said that a donation would be made to St Nicholas Hospice in Suffolk and causes supporting dyslexia.

Hancock joined the show on 9 November 2022 with comedian Seann Walsh. After he entered the jungle camp, Hancock was questioned by his fellow contestants, including Charlene White, Chris Moyles and Babatunde Aléshé, about his time as Health Secretary. Although he expressed remorse about breaking social distancing guidelines, he stated that he had not broken any laws and said he did not regret the political decisions he made during the pandemic.

On the episode aired on 16 November 2022, Hancock said that he told Boris Johnson not to run for prime minister again during the October 2022 Conservative Party leadership election, and said that former prime minister Liz Truss's political career was "totally finished" with "no ambiguity at all."

On 27 November 2022, Hancock reached the final of the show, eventually finishing in third place.

=== Reaction ===
==== Within the show ====
Hancock's participation in the show was met with a mixed reaction by some of the other contestants. In the episode aired on 18 November 2022, fellow contestant Boy George said in a conversation with Seann Walsh that he found Hancock "slimy and slippery", and later told Hancock that he found it difficult to "separate" the politician from the person. Another contestant, journalist Charlene White, said she feared she would lose her job if she was too sympathetic towards Hancock.

==== By others ====
In response to participating in the show, the Conservative Party suspended the whip for Hancock—in effect removing him from their parliamentary group but retaining him as a party member.

On 5 November, it was reported that an online petition to stop Hancock from appearing on the show had attracted nearly 40,000 signatures. The Covid-19 Bereaved Families for Justice and 38 Degrees groups flew a banner over the camp which read: "Covid bereaved say get out of here!".

Prime Minister Rishi Sunak, who had worked with Hancock during his tenure as chancellor, said he was "disappointed" at Hancock's decision to participate in a reality television show and expressed his discomfort at the level of degradation Hancock was subjecting himself to.

Parliamentary Commissioner for Standards Kathryn Stone stated her office had received "dozens of complaints" about Hancock being on the television show. Stone said that Hancock's decision to join the show raised "important questions about members' proper activities while they're supposed to be fulfilling their parliamentary duties and representing their constituents". Ofcom received just under 2,000 complaints about the show in its first week, including complaints over his appearance on the show and complaints criticising how Hancock was treated by other contestants.

Hancock broke government rules about post-ministerial jobs by not consulting the Advisory Committee on Business Appointments before he joined the show, according to Lord Pickles, the committee chair. However, Lord Pickles advised ministers that taking action against Hancock would be disproportionate.

On 23 May 2024, Rishi Sunak restored the whip to Hancock.

== Personal life ==
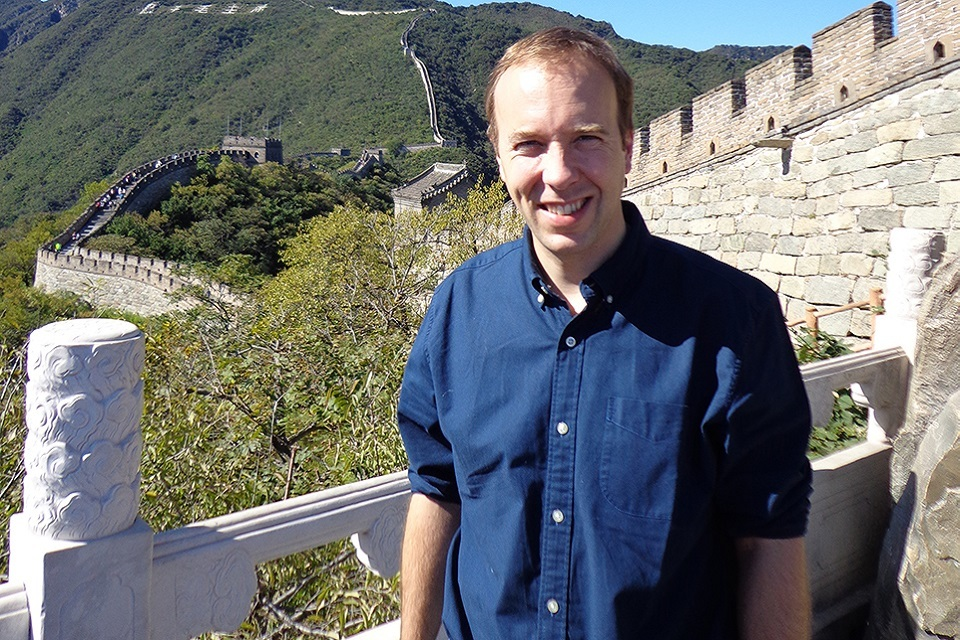
Hancock visiting China to promote co-operation on healthcare innovation

Hancock married Martha Hoyer Millar, an osteopath, in 2006. She is a granddaughter of the 1st Baron Inchyra. They have a daughter and two sons. In 2018 it was reported that Hancock did not allow his children to use social media. The family lived in Little Thurlow in his West Suffolk parliamentary constituency.

In June 2021, following an affair with his political aide Gina Coladangelo, sources reported that he had left his wife for Coladangelo. Hancock confirmed he was still with Coladangelo during a conversation with Babatunde Aléshé on I'm a Celebrity... Get Me Out of Here!.

During his time as an MP, Hancock lived in his constituency, and also had a flat in London.

Hancock trained as a jockey in 2012 and won a horse race in his constituency town of Newmarket. Hancock supports Newcastle United, and auctioned his "pride and joy" signed team shirt to raise money for the NHS in May 2020.

Hancock told The Guardian in 2018 that he has dyslexia, something that he said first became apparent two decades earlier while he was studying at Oxford.

On 25 January 2023, police arrested a 61-year-old man for allegedly assaulting Hancock on the London Underground.

== Notes ==
Parliament of the United Kingdom
Preceded by Richard Spring	Member of Parliament for West Suffolk; 2010–2024	Succeeded by To Be Elected
Political offices
Preceded by John Hayes	Minister of State for Skills and Enterprise; 2013–2014	Succeeded by Nick Boles
Preceded by Michael Fallon	Minister of State for Business and Enterprise; 2014–2015	Succeeded by Anna Soubry as Minister of State for Small Business
Preceded by Michael Fallon	Minister of State for Energy; 2014–2015	Succeeded by Andrea Leadsom
Preceded by Michael Fallon	Minister of State for Portsmouth; 2014–2015	Succeeded by Mark Francois
Preceded by Francis Maude	Minister for the Cabinet Office; 2015–2016	Succeeded by Ben Gummer
Preceded by Francis Maude	Paymaster General; 2015–2016	Succeeded by Ben Gummer
Preceded by Ed Vaizey	Minister of State for Digital and Culture; 2016–2018	Succeeded by Margot James
Preceded by Karen Bradley	Secretary of State for Digital, Culture, Media and Sport; 2018	Succeeded by Jeremy Wright
Preceded by Jeremy Hunt	Secretary of State for Health and Social Care; 2018–2021	Succeeded by Sajid Javid
