= Department for Business, Innovation and Skills =

Defunct ministerial department of the government of the United Kingdom

Department for Business, Innovation and Skills Welsh: Yr Adran Fusnes, Arloesi a Sgiliau

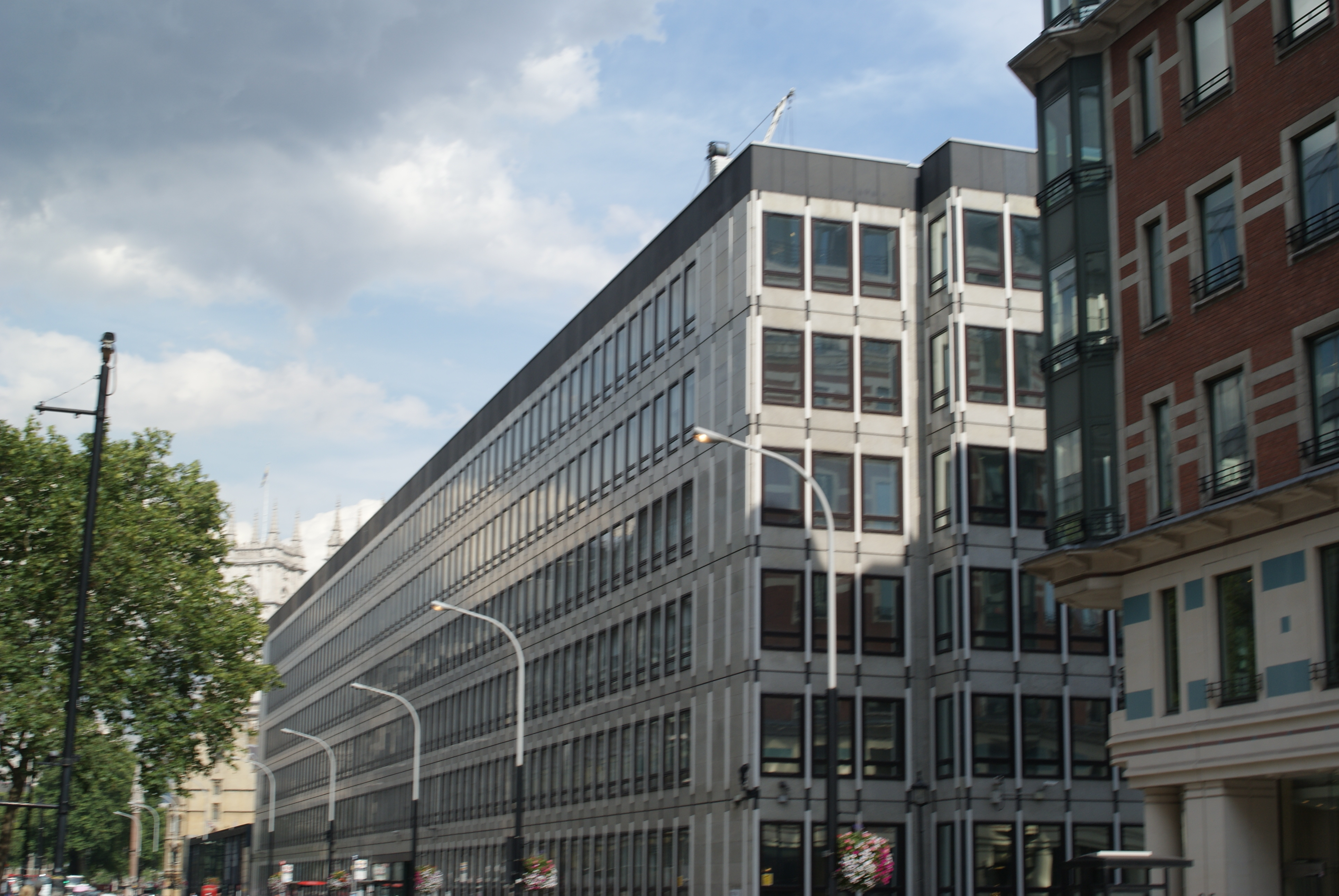

Department overview
- Formed: 5 June 2009
- Preceding Department: Department for Business, Enterprise and Regulatory Reform; Department for Innovation, Universities and Skills
- Dissolved: 14 July 2016
- Superseding Department: Department for Business, Energy and Industrial Strategy; Department for International Trade
- Jurisdiction: United Kingdom
- Headquarters: 1, Victoria Street, London
- Annual budget: £16.5 billion (current) and £1.3 billion (capital) for 2011-12
- Child agencies: Companies House; HM Land Registry; Insolvency Service; Intellectual Property Office; Met Office; National Measurement and Regulation Office; Skills Funding Agency; UK Space Agency
- Website: www.gov.uk/bis

The Department for Business, Innovation and Skills (BIS) was a ministerial department of the Government of the United Kingdom. It was created by the Gordon Brown premiership on 5 June 2009 by the merger of the Department for Innovation, Universities and Skills and the Department for Business, Enterprise and Regulatory Reform. It was disbanded by the Theresa May premiership on the creation of the Department for Business, Energy and Industrial Strategy on 14 July 2016.

== Secretaries of State for Business, Innovation and Skills ==
Name	Portrait	Took office	Left office	Length of term	Political party	Prime Minister
Peter Mandelson, Baron Mandelson		5 June 2009	11 May 2010	11 months and 6 days	Labour	Gordon Brown
Vince Cable		12 May 2010	8 May 2015	4 years, 11 months and 26 days	Liberal Democrats	David Cameron (Coalition)
Sajid Javid		12 May 2015	14 July 2016	1 year, 2 months and 3 days	Conservative	David Cameron (II)

The Permanent Secretary was Sir Martin Donnelly.

== Responsibilities ==
Some policies apply to England alone due to devolution, while others are not devolved and therefore apply to other nations of the United Kingdom. The department was responsible for UK Government policy in the following areas:

- business regulation and support
- company law
- competition
- consumer affairs
- corporate governance
- employment relations
- export licensing
- further education
- higher education
- innovation
- insolvency
- intellectual property
- outer space
- postal affairs
- regional and local economic development
- science and research
- skills
- trade
- training

== Devolution ==
Economic policy is mostly devolved but several important policy areas are reserved to Westminster. Further and higher education policy is mostly devolved. Reserved and excepted matters are outlined below.

Scotland

Reserved matters:

- Competition
- Customer protection
- Import and export control
- Insolvency
- Intellectual property
- Outer space
- Postal services
- Product standards, safety and liability
- Research councils
- Telecommunications
- Time
- Business associations
- Weights and measures in relation to goods

The Scottish Government Economy and Education Directorates handle devolved economic and further and higher education policy respectively.

Northern Ireland

Reserved matters:

- Consumer safety in relation to goods
- Import and export controls, external trade
- Intellectual property
- Postal services
- Telecommunications
- Units of measurement

Excepted matter:

- outer space

The department's main counterparts are:

- Department of Enterprise, Trade and Investment (general economic policy)
- Department for Employment and Learning (employment relations, further and higher education policy)

Wales

Under the Welsh devolution settlement, specific policy areas are transferred to the Welsh Government rather than reserved to Westminster.

== See also ==
- Feltag
