= High Speed Rail (West Midlands – Crewe) Bill Select Committee =

The High Speed Rail (West Midlands – Crewe) Bill Select Committee is a select committee of the House of Commons in the Parliament of the United Kingdom. The Committee was established in 2018 with a remit to provide persons and bodies the opportunity to suggest amendments to the bill.

== Membership ==
As of 31 March 2019, the members of the committee are as follows:

Member	Party	Constituency
James Duddridge MP	Conservative	Rochford and Southend East
Sandy Martin MP	Labour	Ipswich
Sheryll Murray MP	Conservative	South East Cornwall
Martin Whitfield MP	Labour	East Lothian
Bill Wiggin MP	Conservative	North Herefordshire

== See also ==
- Parliamentary committees of the United Kingdom
