= Death and state funeral of Kenneth Kaunda =

July 2021 state funeral in Zambia

State funeral of Kenneth Kaunda
- Date: 2 July 2021
- Location: Lusaka Show Grounds, Lusaka

Kenneth Kaunda, the first President of Zambia, died on 17 June 2021 at Mina Soko Medical Centre in Lusaka. The government announced a 21-day mourning period. During the mourning period Kaunda's body was taken around all 10 provincial towns and in each provincial capital, and a short church ceremony was conducted by the Military and the United Church of Zambia which Kaunda belonged. The state funeral took place on 2 July. Due to the COVID-19 restrictions attendance was strictly by invitation. The funeral service was broadcast on national TV networks in Zambia, South Africa and around the region. Several African countries had declared an official period of national mourning. Zimbabwe declared fourteen days of mourning; South Africa declared ten days of mourning; Botswana, Malawi, Namibia and Tanzania all declared seven days of mourning; Mozambique declared six days of mourning; South Sudan declared three days of mourning; Cuba declared one day of mourning.

== Background ==
On 14 June 2021, Kaunda was admitted to Maina Soko Military Hospital in Lusaka to be treated for an undisclosed medical condition. The Zambian government said medics were doing everything they could to help him recover, though it was not clear what his health condition was. On 15 June 2021, it was revealed that he was being treated for pneumonia, which, according to his doctor, had been a recurring problem in his health. On 17 June 2021, it was confirmed that he died at the age of 97 after that short illness at Maina Soko Military Hospital.

== Funeral and burial service ==
Kaunda's funeral took place at Lusaka Show Grounds on 2 July 2021, after his body had its last provincial visit. Ordinary Zambian citizens came out to show their last respects as they waved their white handkerchiefs in mourning, an item Kaunda carried with him when he was incarcerated during the struggle for liberation. During the state funeral, a 21-gun salute was given to the former president.

== Reactions ==
=== The Kaunda family ===
The letter, dated June 23, 2021:

"We, the undersigned, representing the collective view of the family, have taken into consideration the proposal to exhume Dr Kaunda's remains from Embassy Park after the burial to be relocated at his residence as a compromise to the family's request.

"However, we find this proposal unnecessary as our gallant first president needs to rest in peace at his final resting place.

"We therefore humbly request the government reconsiders its decision to bury him at Embassy Park and honour what was his only final wish, to be buried next to his dear wife at his residence."

On 1 July Kaunda's grandchildren wrote a letter on behalf of the family to President Edgar Lungu to reconsider the decision to bury Kaunda at Embassy Park. On 6 July 2021, news came out about the uncertainty whether the national memorial site reserved for former presidents will be his final resting place as Kunda's son, Kaweche, asked the court to direct the State to allow the family to bury him at his farm residence, next to his wife Betty, as per his wishes. The Zambian government said that he could be exhumed later to be reburied there. But the country's Solicitor-General Abraham Mwansa responded by saying "We are yet to be served any papers regarding the court process."

=== The United Kingdom ===
The Queen, in her message of condolence to President Edgar Lungu, wrote ""I was greatly saddened to receive news of the death of Kenneth Kaunda. During and after his presidency, he worked tirelessly for the good of the Zambian people. His regional leadership in maintaining Zambia as a bastion against Apartheid has earnt him a place in history. I will always remember our meetings, and the warmth that Dr Kaunda felt for the Commonwealth. I send you and the Zambian people my condolences in this great loss."

Her Majesty The Queen and Her Government and the United Kingdom was represented by the Minister for Africa James Duddridge.

=== South Africa ===
President Cyril Ramaphosa of South Africa hailed the late Zambian former President Kenneth Kaunda as the last of a generation who lit the path to Africa's freedom an act of courage and selflessness and the support he showed to South Africa during one of the country's darkest and most volatile periods in its history. In his speech he stated "Africa joins the people of Zambia and all the peoples on our continent in mourning the passing of our great leader and father. The father of liberation in our regions, SADC Dr Kenneth Kaunda was a loyal friend of the people of South Africa." President of South Africa declares 10 days of mourning to honour Kaunda.

== Attendee ==
Dignitaries
Country	Title	Dignitary	ref
Malawi	President	Lazarus Chakwera	
Mozambique	President	Filipe Nyusi	
Namibia	President	Hage Geingob	
South Africa	President	Cyril Ramaphosa	
Zimbabwe	President	Emmerson Mnangagwa	
Botswana	President	Mokgweetsi Masisi	
Kenya	President	Uhuru Kenyatta	
Ghana	President	Nana Akufo-Addo	
Lesotho	Prime Minister	Moeketsi Majoro	
Eswatini	Prime Minister	Cleopas Dlamini	
Angola	Vice-President	Bornito de Sousa	

Government representatives
Country	Title	Dignitary	ref
United Kingdom	Minister for Africa	James Duddridge	

Former leaders
Country	Title	Dignitary	ref
Tanzania	4th President	Jakaya Kikwete	
