= Parliamentary Under-Secretary of State for Africa =

UK Foreign Office ministerial position

- Royal Arms of His Majesty's Government

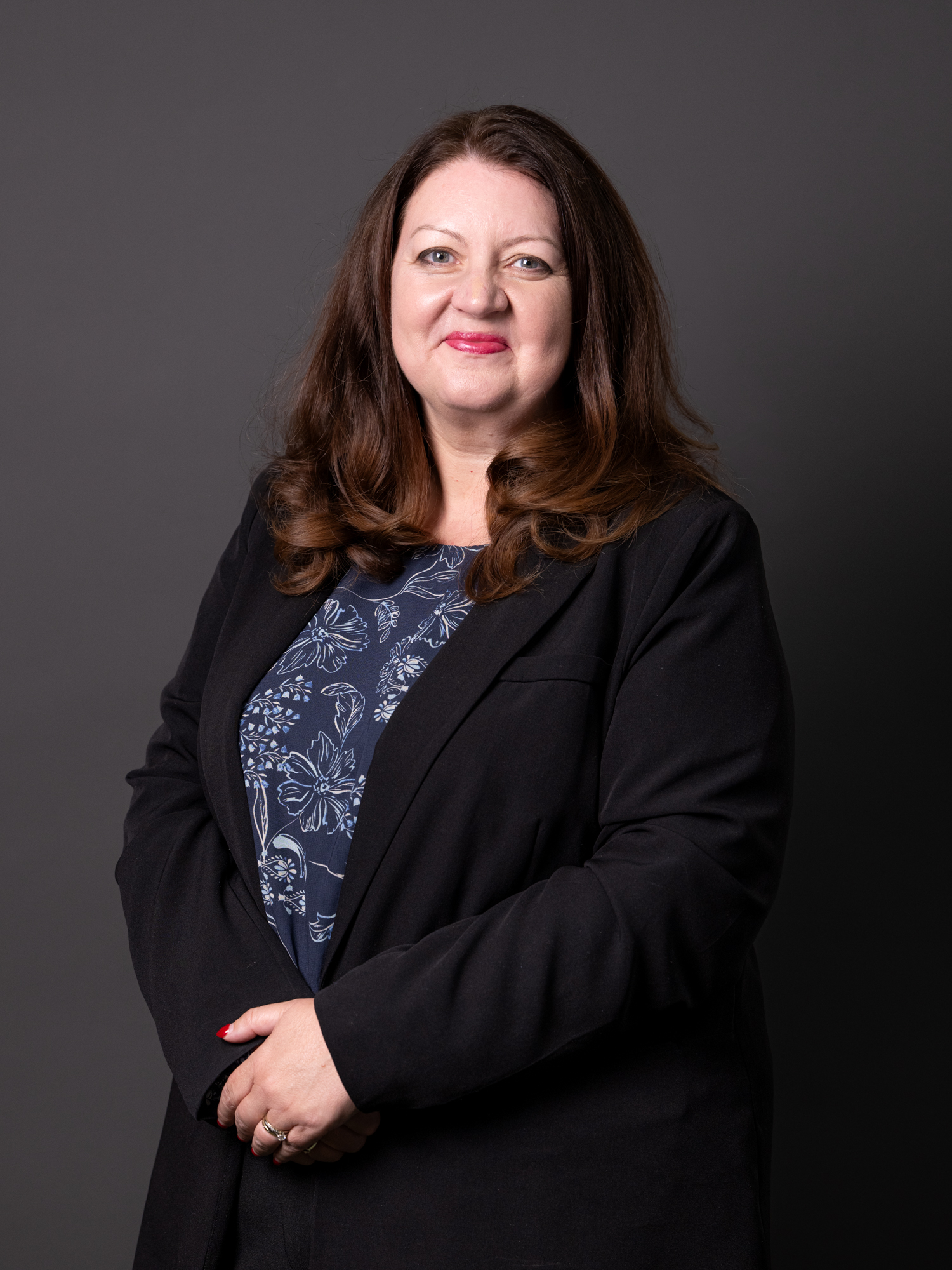
- Incumbent; Kirsty McNeill since 21 July 2026
- Foreign, Commonwealth and Development Office
- Style: Minister
- Nominator: Prime Minister
- Appointer: The King (on the advice of the Prime Minister)
- Term length: At His Majesty's pleasure
- Formation: 28 June 2007

The parliamentary under-secretary of state for Africa is a ministerial portfolio in the Foreign, Commonwealth and Development Office of the UK government. The minister has responsibility for most of Africa, except North Africa which is part of the parliamentary under-secretary of state for the Middle East, North Africa, Afghanistan and Pakistan portfolio.

== History ==
During the Brown ministry, Mark Malloch Brown was appointed Minister of State at the Foreign and Commonwealth Office with Africa included as part of his portfolio. North Africa was combined with the Middle East in a single portfolio held by Bill Rammell. Following the Conservative Party's victory at the 2010 United Kingdom general election and the subsequent formation of the Cameron-Clegg coalition, both portfolios were retained but demoted to Parliamentary Under-Secretary of State rank and assigned to Henry Bellingham and Alistair Burt, respectively. Upon the formation of the First May ministry, both portfolios were combined into a single Parliamentary Under-Secretary of State for the Middle East and Africa held by Tobias Ellwood, but were later returned to their original portfolios at Minister of State rank. This arrangement was retained by the First Johnson ministry, but under the Second Johnson ministry the Africa portfolio was demoted back to Parliamentary Secretary rank.

In early 2022, Africa was combined with Latin America and the Caribbean in a new parliamentary under-secretary of state portfolio assigned to Vicky Ford, while North Africa was joined with South and Central Asia. During the brief Truss ministry, responsibility for the whole of Africa was assigned to Gillian Keegan as Parliamentary Under-Secretary of State. For the duration of the Sunak ministry North Africa was once again combined with the Middle East portfolio under Lord Ahmad of Wimbledon, while the rest of Africa was combined with the Minister of State for Development under Andrew Mitchell. With the formation of the Starmer ministry in 2024, North Africa and the Middle East were assigned to Hamish Falconer and the rest of Africa to Lord Collins of Highbury, both as Parliamentary Under-Secretaries of State.

== Responsibilities ==
The following is a list of the office's current responsibilities:

- Africa
- United Nations, Commonwealth and multilateral
- democracy and human rights
- Prime Minister’s Special Envoy for Preventing Sexual Violence in Conflict

== List of ministers for Africa ==
The following is a list of ministers for Africa since 2007:

Title	Name	Portrait	Term of office		Length of service	Political party	P.M.	F.Sec.
Minister of State for Africa and the United Nations (Note: North Africa was the responsibility of Bill Rammell from 2007 to 2009 and Ivan Lewis from 2009 to 2010.)	Mark Malloch Brown; Baron Malloch-Brown		28 June 2007	24 July 2009	2 years and 26 days	Labour	Brown	Miliband
Minister of State for Africa and the United Nations	Glenys Kinnock; Baroness Kinnock of Holyhead		13 October 2009	11 May 2010	6 months and 28 days	Labour	Brown	Miliband
Parliamentary Under-Secretary of State for Africa (Note: North Africa was part of Alistair Burt's portfolio as Parliamentary Under-Secretary of State for the Middle East and North Africa)	Henry Bellingham; MP for North West Norfolk		11 May 2010	5 September 2012	6 months and 18 days	Conservative	Cameron	Hague
Parliamentary Under-Secretary of State (Note: North Africa was part of Alistair Burt's portfolio.)	Mark Simmonds; MP for Boston and Skegness		5 September 2012	11 August 2014	1 year, 7 months and 3 days	Conservative	Cameron	Hague
Parliamentary Under-Secretary of State (Note: North Africa was part of Tobias Ellwood's portfolio.)	James Duddridge; MP for Rochford and Southend East		11 August 2014	16 July 2016	11 months and 22 days	Conservative	Cameron	Hammond
Parliamentary Under-Secretary of State for the Middle East and Africa	Tobias Ellwood; MP for Bournemouth East		16 July 2016	13 June 2017	10 months and 28 days	Conservative	May	Johnson
Minister of State for International Development and Africa (Note: North Africa was the responsibility of Alistair Burt as Minister of State for the Middle East and North Africa.)	Rory Stewart; MP for Penrith and The Border		15 June 2017	9 January 2018	6 months and 25 days	Conservative	May	Johnson
Minister of State for International Development and Africa (Note: North Africa was the responsibility of Alistair Burt as Minister of State for the Middle East and North Africa.)	Harriett Baldwin; MP for West Worcestershire		9 January 2018	25 July 2019	1 year, 6 months and 16 days	Conservative	May	Hunt
Minister of State for Africa (Note: North Africa was the responsibility of Andrew Murrison as Minister of State for the Middle East and North Africa.)	Andrew Stephenson; MP for Pendle		25 July 2019	13 February 2020	6 months and 18 days	Conservative	Johnson	Raab
Parliamentary Under-Secretary of State for Africa (Note: North Africa was the responsibility of James Cleverly as Minister of State for the Middle East and North Africa.)	James Duddridge; MP for Rochford and Southend East		13 February 2020	16 September 2021	1 year, 7 months and 3 days	Conservative	Johnson	Raab
Parliamentary Under-Secretary of State for Africa (2021–2022) (Note: North Africa was the responsibility of James Cleverly as Minister of State for the Middle East and North Africa.); Parliamentary Under-Secretary of State for Africa, Latin America, and the Caribbean (2022) (Note: North Africa was the respponsibility of Lord Ahmad of Wimbledon as Minister of State for South and Central Asia, United Nations, and the Commonwealth.)	Vicky Ford; MP for Chelmsford		16 September 2021	6 September 2022	11 months and 22 days	Conservative	Johnson	Truss
Parliamentary Under-Secretary of State for Africa	Gillian Keegan; MP for Chichester		7 September 2022	25 October 2022	1 month and 18 days	Conservative	Truss	Cleverly
Minister of State for Development and Africa (Note: North Africa was the responsibility of Lord Ahmad of Wimbledon as minister of state for Middle East, North Africa, South Asia, United Nations and the Commonwealth.)	Andrew Mitchell; MP for Sutton Coldfield		25 October 2022	5 July 2024	1 month and 18 days	Conservative	Sunak	Cleverly; Cameron
Parliamentary Under-Secretary of State for Africa (Note: North Africa is the responsibility of Hamish Falconer as parliamentary under-secretary of state for the Middle East, North Africa, Afghanistan and Pakistan.)	Ray Collins; Baron Collins of Highbury		9 July 2024	7 September 2025	1 year, 1 month and 29 days	Labour	Starmer	Lammy
Minister of State for International Development and Africa	Jenny Chapman; Baroness Chapman of Darlington		5 September 2025	20 July 2026	10 months and 15 days	Labour	Starmer	Cooper
Minister of State for International Development and Africa	Kirsty McNeill; MP for Midlothian		21 July 2026	Incumbent	4 months	Labour	Burnham	Miliband

== See also ==
- Secretary of State for Foreign, Commonwealth and Development Affairs
- Minister of State for Europe
- Parliamentary Under-Secretary of State for Foreign, Commonwealth and Development Affairs
