= Joey Barton =

English association football player and manager (born 1982)

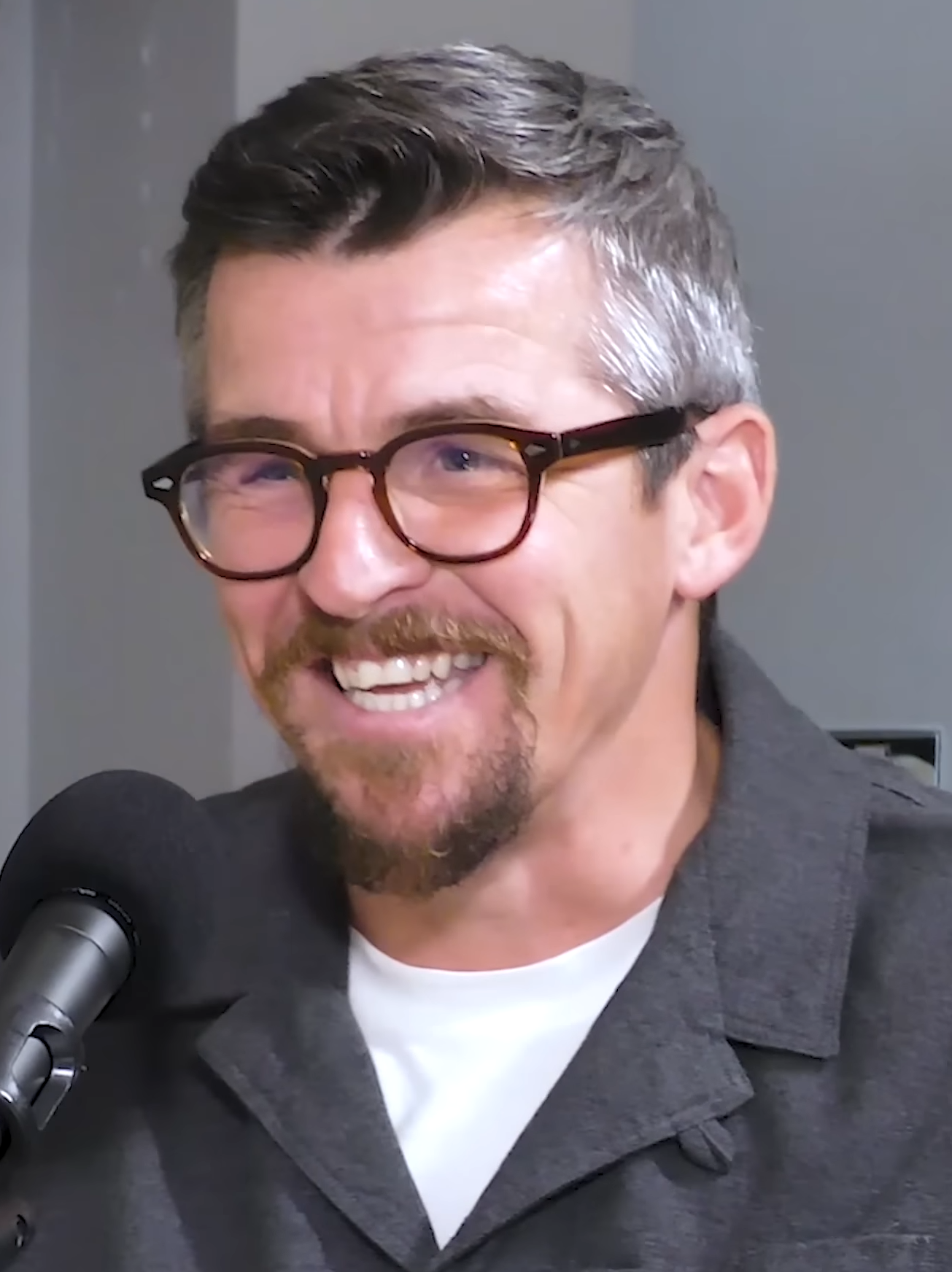
- Barton in 2023

Personal information
- Full name: Joseph Anthony Barton
- Date of birth: 2 September 1982 (age 44)
- Place of birth: Huyton, Merseyside, England
- Height: 5 ft 9 in (1.75 m)
- Position: Midfielder

Youth career
- –1996: Everton
- 1996: Liverpool
- 1997–2002: Manchester City

Senior career*
Years	Team	Apps	(Gls)
2002–2007	Manchester City	130	(15)
2007–2011	Newcastle United	81	(7)
2011–2015	Queens Park Rangers	93	(7)
2012–2013	→ Marseille (loan)	25	(0)
2015–2016	Burnley	38	(3)
2016	Rangers	5	(0)
2017	Burnley	14	(1)
Total		386	(33)

International career
2003	England U21	2	(1)
2007	England	1	(0)

Managerial career
- 2018–2021: Fleetwood Town
- 2021–2023: Bristol Rovers
- * Club domestic league appearances and goals

Joseph Anthony Barton (born 2 September 1982) is an English professional football manager and former player who played as a midfielder. Barton made 269 appearances in the Premier League, including 130 for Manchester City; he was most recently the manager of League One side Bristol Rovers.

Barton was born and raised in Huyton, Merseyside. He began his football career with Manchester City in 2002 after working his way through their youth system. His appearances in the first team gradually increased over the following five years and he made more than 150 for the club. He earned his only cap for the England national team in February 2007. He joined Newcastle United for a fee of £5.8 million in July 2007. After four years with the club, he joined Queens Park Rangers in August 2011, from where he was loaned to Marseille in 2012. He returned from his loan spell the following season, and helped QPR to promotion to the Premier League via the Championship play-offs.

QPR were relegated again, and Barton was released at the end of the season. He signed a one-year deal to play for Burnley in 2015, helping them win promotion to the Premier League, but left to join Rangers in May 2016. He was banned from football after admitting a Football Association charge relating to betting in April 2017, and upon its expiry in June 2018 commenced his managerial career with Fleetwood Town, remaining in charge until January 2021.

Barton's career and life have been marked by numerous controversial incidents and disciplinary problems and he has been convicted twice of violent crimes. On 20 May 2008, he was sentenced to six months' imprisonment for common assault and affray during an incident in Liverpool city centre. Barton served 74 days of this prison term, being released on 28 July 2008. On 1 July 2008, he was also given a four-month suspended sentence after admitting assault occasioning actual bodily harm on former teammate Ousmane Dabo during a training-ground dispute on 1 May 2007. This incident effectively ended his Manchester City career. Barton has been charged with violent conduct three times by the Football Association: for the assault on Dabo, for punching Morten Gamst Pedersen in the stomach, and for attacking three players in the final game of the 2011–12 season where he got sent off against Manchester City.

== Early life ==
Joseph Anthony Barton was born on 2 September 1982 in Huyton, Merseyside, the oldest of four brothers. When he was 14, his parents separated; thereafter, he lived with his father at his grandmother's house on a different estate. He has said that his grandmother's influence helped him to avoid getting caught up in a recreational drug culture and attributes his work ethic to his father. His father, also named Joseph, worked as a roofer and played football semi-professionally for Northwich Victoria. Barton enjoyed physical education at his school, St Thomas Becket, which he represented in various sports and was a talented rugby league prospect. He left school with 10 GCSEs.

== Club career ==
=== Early career ===
Barton joined Everton's youth system. He underwent trials at Nottingham Forest, but was rejected when it was decided he was too small to become a footballer. Barton said his rejection by clubs only made him more determined to succeed as a footballer and prove his detractors wrong. He made his first appearance for Manchester City's under-17s team in 1999. His first reserve-team appearance came at the end of the 2000–01 season, in his final year as a trainee. Uncertain about Barton's future prospects, the club planned to release him, but reconsidered and gave him his first professional contract in the close season. Over the next two years, he made the transition from the under-19s to regular reserve football. He was promoted to the first-team squad aged 19.

=== Manchester City ===
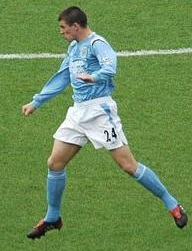
Barton playing for Manchester City in 2004

Barton would have made his debut for the City first team in November 2002 against Middlesbrough, had he not lost his shirt after leaving it on the substitutes' bench at half-time. He eventually made his first-team debut for the club against Bolton Wanderers on 5 April 2003. His first senior goal came two weeks later in a 2–0 win over Tottenham Hotspur on Good Friday. He ended the 2002–03 season with a run of seven consecutive starts.

After impressing in his first season at City, Barton was offered a new one-year contract at the club by manager Kevin Keegan, which he signed in April 2003. He featured in the first team more regularly during the 2003–04 season and, following a second Premiership goal, was rewarded with a call-up to the England U21 squad for their 2004 European Championship qualifiers against Macedonia and Portugal.

An FA Cup match against Tottenham saw Barton receive the first red card of his career in unusual circumstances: at half-time, with his club 3–0 down, he argued with the referee and was sent off although the match was not in progress. In the second half, despite playing with 10 men, Barton's teammates achieved an unlikely 4–3 victory. Barton left the City of Manchester Stadium in anger on 17 April, after not being named by manager Keegan in the team to play Southampton. However, he featured regularly in the 2003–04 season, which he completed with 39 appearances and one goal. His displays impressed City's supporters, and at the end of the 2003–04 season he was awarded with the club's Young Player of the Year award.

Barton sparked a 10-man brawl in a friendly match against Doncaster Rovers on 25 July 2004 after "hacking" at an opposition player. Although he signed a new contract on 22 September 2004, which would keep him at City until 2007, the club considered sacking Barton in December 2004 after an incident at their Christmas party. He stubbed out a lit cigar in youth player Jamie Tandy's eye, after he had caught Tandy attempting to set fire to his shirt. Barton subsequently apologised for his actions and was fined six weeks' wages (£60,000).

In May 2005, Barton broke a 35-year-old pedestrian's leg while driving his car through Liverpool city centre at 2 am. In the summer of 2005, Barton was sent home from a pre-season tournament in Thailand after assaulting a 15-year-old Everton supporter who had provoked Barton by verbally abusing him and kicking his shin. Barton had to be restrained from attacking the boy further by teammate Richard Dunne. Barton underwent anger management therapy at the order of City manager Stuart Pearce and paid £120,000 in club fines. In the autumn of 2005, Barton began a seven-day programme of behavioural management at the Sporting Chance Clinic, a charity set up to help troubled sportsmen and women.

Barton handed in a written transfer request in January 2006, which the club rejected. The following day, it also rejected a verbal offer for Barton from Middlesbrough. During the following week, Barton said that he had been "a little bit impetuous" in making such a request and agreed to begin negotiations on a new contract at City. He was rewarded with a new four-year deal, which he signed on 25 July, ending speculation about his future.

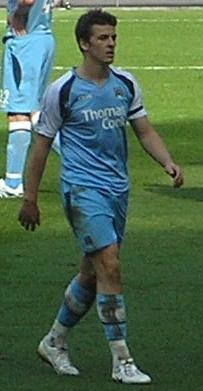
Barton playing for Manchester City in 2007

Barton's behaviour appeared to improve after his participation at the Sporting Chance Clinic. However, on 30 September 2006, television cameras captured Barton exposing his backside to Everton fans, following City's injury-time equaliser in a match at Goodison Park. Barton had received abuse from Everton supporters throughout the match and the gesture has since been described as "light-hearted" and "inoffensive" by people involved in football. Merseyside Police looked into the incident, but announced in October that no further action would be taken, although Barton was fined £2,000 for bringing the game into disrepute and warned about his future conduct by the Football Association.

In November 2006, Barton was involved in a memorable goal celebration. After scoring for Manchester City against Fulham, striker Bernardo Corradi ran to the corner flag, followed by teammate Barton. Corradi proceeded to remove the corner flag and "knight" the kneeling Barton. In December 2006, Barton received the second red card of his career, for a late two-footed tackle on Bolton Wanderers player Abdoulaye Faye.

Barton's agent Willie McKay said in January 2007 that if any team offered at least £5.5 million for Barton, it would trigger a release clause in his contract that would mean City would have to allow Barton to talk to the interested club. This reportedly prompted Everton manager David Moyes to make an inquiry to City about Barton's availability. The next day Barton said: "People are trying to unsettle me but I'm happy to stay here".

Barton was arrested on suspicion of assault and criminal damage after an alleged argument with a taxi driver in Liverpool while going to his hotel after a match on 13 March 2007. He was cleared of this charge in May 2008.

Barton displayed his outspokenness once again on 22 April 2007 when he publicly criticised City's performances during the 2006–07 season, and described some of the players the club had signed as "substandard". Following his comments, City's manager Stuart Pearce banned him from speaking to the media.

Barton was fined £100,000 and suspended by City until the end of the 2006–07 season on 1 May 2007, following an incident during training when he assaulted his teammate Ousmane Dabo. Dabo said that he had been hit several times, was left unconscious and had to go to hospital after suffering injuries to his head, including a suspected detached retina. Dabo requested that the police press charges against Barton, and as a result, Barton was arrested and questioned by Greater Manchester Police. This altercation effectively ended Barton's time at City. He later cited a "relationship breakdown" with Stuart Pearce as the main reason he left the club. Barton was bailed until August and was later charged with assault, to which he initially pleaded not guilty. He later changed this to a guilty plea and on 1 July 2008 was sentenced to a four-month suspended prison sentence plus 200 hours of community service and ordered to pay £3,000 compensation and Dabo's court costs. Barton was also charged with violent conduct by the FA. Barton pleaded guilty and on 1 September 2008 was banned for six matches, with a further six-match ban suspended for two years, and fined £25,000.

=== Newcastle United ===
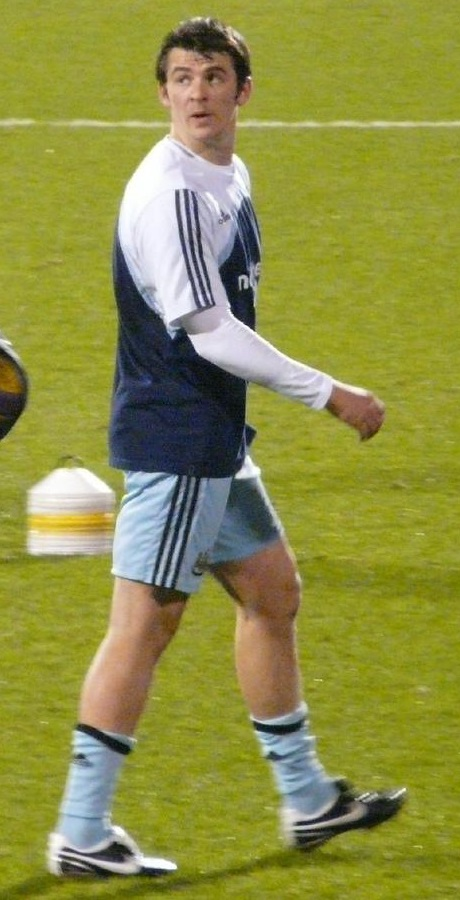
Barton warming up for Newcastle United in 2007

Following offers from Newcastle United and West Ham United, Barton joined Newcastle on 14 June 2007 for a fee of £5.8 million. The contract negotiations had become protracted after Manchester City refused to pay Barton a fee of £300,000 to which he was reported to be entitled if he left the club without submitting a request for transfer. Newcastle United consequently raised its initial offer of £5.5 million to £5.8, in effect compensating Manchester City for the £300,000 discrepancy. Barton said that his desire to win trophies helped him to make the decision, along with his admiration for manager Sam Allardyce. He made his Newcastle debut in a friendly against Hartlepool United on 17 July 2007. Four days later, he was ruled out for six to seven weeks after fracturing the fifth metatarsal bone in his left foot during a friendly match with Carlisle United. He was ruled out for a further month in October 2007.

Barton eventually made his Premier League debut for Newcastle on 22 October 2007, coming on as a second-half substitute in a 3–1 win over Tottenham. During his first Tyne–Wear derby for Newcastle against Sunderland, Barton appeared to raise his foot dangerously in a challenge with Sunderland's Dickson Etuhu, leading to the News of the World running with the headline "Ban Him". The FA were unable to charge Barton for the incident because match official Martin Atkinson had seen the act take place in the match and had taken no action. FIFA regulations dictate that a retrospective charge for violent conduct can be made only if the match official did not notice the incident. Barton later apologised for the tackle. Early in December, he called for Newcastle fans to give the team more time after their abuse of manager Sam Allardyce, calling them "vicious". He later played this down, saying his comments had been misrepresented.

On 27 December 2007, Barton was arrested on suspicion of assault in the Church Street area of Liverpool city centre following an incident which took place at 5:30 am. He was remanded in custody on 28 December since the offence was committed whilst he was on bail for two prior offences; the presiding magistrate said: "I also have to consider the safety of the public – you lashed out indiscriminately". CCTV showed Barton punching a man 20 times causing him to lose consciousness and attacking a teenager, breaking some of his teeth. On 20 May 2008, he was sentenced to six months in jail after pleading guilty for his part in the December 2007 assault. Barton's cousin, Nadine Wilson, and his brother Andrew Barton also pleaded guilty to their part in the assaults and received suspended sentences. Barton admitted to being an alcoholic and claimed he wanted to achieve "total abstinence" in order to improve his behaviour. He served 74 days of his prison term, being released on 28 July 2008.

Barton's subsequent conviction, a four-month suspended sentence for the earlier assault on Ousmane Dabo at Manchester City, was handed out while serving this sentence. He returned to playing action on 30 August 2008, six days before his FA hearing, as a second-half substitute during Newcastle's 3–0 defeat to Arsenal. He came on to a chorus of boos from the Arsenal supporters. Shortly into this return match, Barton was involved in an incident with Samir Nasri, putting in a strong tackle, for which the referee did not give a foul. The tackle, though hard, was legal. Minutes later, Nasri deliberately clipped Barton while tracking back, for which he was booked. At the end of the match, Newcastle manager Kevin Keegan was involved in an altercation with Nasri and Arsenal captain William Gallas, in regards to the incident.

It was a brief stint back in the playing squad, with Barton banned for six matches, with a further suspended six-match ban, for his assault on Dabo. After serving his ban, he played 75 minutes in a reserve match and said he wanted to transform his image to become a role model, before he returned to action in the Tyne–Wear derby on 25 October. He was booed by Sunderland fans and had missiles thrown at him as he warmed up, as Newcastle lost 2–1. Without him, Newcastle had not recorded a league victory since the second match of the season, but Barton scored a penalty in his second match back to lift the club out of the relegation zone. The suspended six-match ban was nearly brought into action when Barton appeared to flick Aston Villa striker Gabriel Agbonlahor in the club's next match, but the FA decided not to punish Barton. However, further allegations that Barton had made a racist remark to Agbonlahor were cause enough for the FA to reconsider this decision. The remarks claim remains unfounded and 'professional lip-readers' claimed he said nothing racist. In Newcastle's 2–2 draw with Wigan on 15 November 2008, Barton was injured after a tackle from Lee Cattermole. It was later confirmed that Barton would be out for two months with a medial ligament injury. Returning to the first team at the end of January, he played only twice before again breaking his metatarsal during a 2–1 defeat to his old club Manchester City.

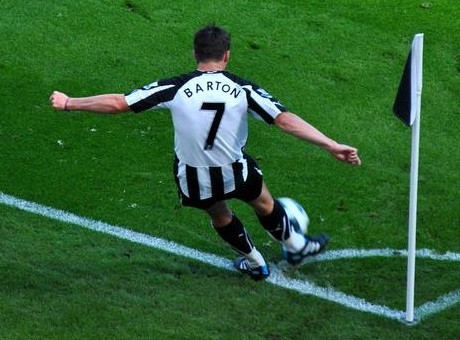
Barton playing for Newcastle United in 2010

In his first appearance in over three months on 3 May 2009, Barton was sent off late in a 3–0 loss to Liverpool at Anfield for a sliding challenge on Xabi Alonso. The red card ruled Barton out of Newcastle's remaining three matches of the season, with the club in danger of relegation from the Premier League. Newcastle manager Alan Shearer raised doubts about Barton's future at the club, saying: "I think it would be wrong to discuss his future now, but I'm not very happy." On 5 May, Newcastle United announced the suspension of Barton indefinitely, and he was told to stay away from the club. As a result, Barton's future at Newcastle United was put in doubt. The club suspension was widely reportedly to have resulted not directly from the red card, but from a dressing room confrontation with Shearer and assistant manager Iain Dowie following the match. Shearer said he made a mistake putting Barton back into the team, and that his tackle was "a coward's tackle", to which Barton replied that he was "the best player at the club", and Shearer had to play him. Shearer said that Barton was not, and that he was "shit". Barton replied that Shearer was "a shit manager with shit tactics". When Dowie intervened, Barton called him "a prick".

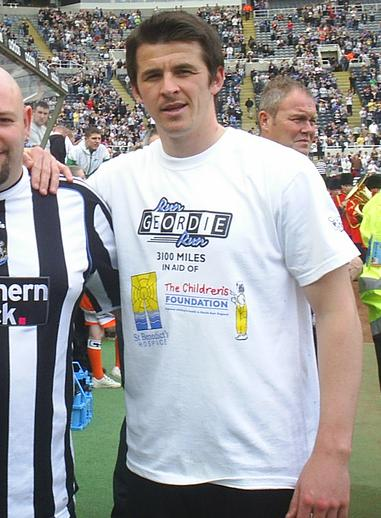
Joey Barton poses with a Newcastle United supporter at St James' Park prior to the Blackpool match in April 2010.

Barton stayed on with Newcastle United after they were relegated to the Championship, playing six out of Newcastle's opening eight league matches, but suffered an injury to his foot in a 3–1 win against Plymouth Argyle on 19 September. He returned in April for Newcastle, playing all nine of Newcastle's remaining league fixtures and scoring his only goal of the campaign from a free kick in a win over Peterborough United.

Barton started his new club season 2010–11 as a first-team regular, playing against Manchester United on the opening day. On 10 November, in a 2–1 defeat to Blackburn, Barton again acted violently, punching Morten Gamst Pedersen in the chest. He was not punished during the match as the officials did not see the incident, but after reviewing the evidence, the FA again charged Barton with violent conduct. Barton apologised, accepted the charge, and was banned for three matches. Barton courted controversy once again during Newcastle's 3–1 win over Liverpool on 11 December 2010, when he appeared to direct homophobic remarks and a lewd gesture at Fernando Torres. Barton scored two penalties against Arsenal on 5 February 2011 as Newcastle came from a 4–0 deficit to draw 4–4. He was involved in an altercation with Abou Diaby, which led to a straight red card for Diaby. Diaby had taken offence to Barton's strong challenge and retaliated by grabbing Barton by the neck and shoving him to the ground.

On 25 May 2011, Barton's agent Willie McKay confirmed that his client would not be signing a new contract at St James' Park after contract talks broke down between the club and player. Barton was officially transfer listed by Newcastle on 1 August 2011, and it was also stated that he could leave for free with his current contract yet to expire. Barton was set to leave Newcastle following his teammate Kevin Nolan, who had earlier joined West Ham United, but Barton insisted on not moving. Joey Barton also criticised the Newcastle board after it was decided he could leave the club on a free transfer. With Newcastle continuing to decline the offer of a new contract, after he refused an earlier offer, on 24 August 2011, Barton was given permission to talk to QPR. Thanking the Newcastle fans, he left on 26 August 2011.

A week before his signing with QPR, Barton was involved in an altercation with Gervinho of Arsenal, which resulted in Gervinho being sent off on his debut. Then, Alex Song stamped on Barton, for which Song received a three-match ban. Barton later said he was on the verge of joining Arsenal but his incident with Gervinho ended his hopes of a move to the Emirates, and instead he joined Queens Park Rangers.

=== Queens Park Rangers ===
On 26 August 2011, Barton moved to QPR, signing a four-year contract on a free transfer. He was handed the captain's armband by manager Neil Warnock on his debut with the club, which was a 0–0 draw with former club Newcastle. On 17 September, he scored his first goal for QPR during a 3–0 win against Wolverhampton Wanderers. Following his goal, Barton was involved in a physical confrontation with Wolves player Karl Henry. Barton and Henry had had a previous physical confrontation in August 2010 when Barton was still at Newcastle. Barton accused Henry of "trying to hurt people". Henry responded by calling Barton's behaviour "embarrassing".

On 2 January 2012, Barton scored the opening goal in QPR's match against Norwich City, his second for the club. He was later given a straight red card after head-butting Norwich midfielder Bradley Johnson. With QPR down to 10 men they went on to lose the match 2–1. When Warnock was replaced as manager by Mark Hughes in January 2012, Hughes confirmed that Barton would remain captain. Barton's performance in QPR's 3–2 home victory against Liverpool saw him booed by QPR fans, who promptly cheered when he was substituted just after the hour mark. Barton admitted that his performance was "awful" and the "worst I've ever played in my career" but also criticised the QPR fans for not sticking with the team in their battle against relegation. Barton's third goal for the club came in a 3–0 victory at home to Swansea on 11 April 2011.

On 13 May, on the final day of the season, with QPR requiring at least a draw in their match away at Manchester City or for Bolton Wanderers to not win in order to guarantee Premier League safety, Barton was sent off in the 55th minute for violent misconduct after elbowing Carlos Tevez in the face. Immediately after being shown a red card, he kicked Sergio Agüero in the back of the knee and attempted to head-butt Vincent Kompany. Barton had to be dragged from the pitch by former teammate Micah Richards as he rowed with Manchester City players and staff and attempted to square-off with striker Mario Balotelli. QPR went on to concede two late goals and lose the match 3–2, but avoided relegation due to Bolton's draw at Stoke City. Barton commented after the match saying that he was trying to "take [one] of their players with me." The FA responded by issuing two charges of violent conduct against him, for the kick and the attempted head-butt, the initial foul already carrying with it a charge of violent conduct. Barton accepted the charge for kicking Agüero but denied the charge for attempting to head-butt Kompany. QPR also began an internal investigation into his behaviour, amid speculation that he would be stripped of the captaincy, fined and possibly either sold, released on a free transfer or have his contract terminated for gross misconduct.

On 23 May, Barton attended an FA hearing. Punishing him for all three counts of violent conduct, Barton was handed a 12-match ban and fined £75,000. On 25 June, QPR announced the results of its internal investigation. Barton was stripped of the captaincy and fined six weeks' wages, believed to have been around £500,000. Barton was also removed from the club's pre-season tour of Asia, and in a statement the club said that they had "also reached agreement with Barton that if he seriously breaches the club's disciplinary procedures again, the club reserves the right to terminate his contract". Barton responded by saying that "My behaviour was wrong and I accept the punishment that has been imposed upon me as a result."

On 31 July 2012, Barton played 45 minutes of a friendly match for League Two team Fleetwood Town in the club's 4–0 win over Kilmarnock. He had been training with Fleetwood after being left out of Queens Park Rangers' tour of Malaysia. Fleetwood attempted to sign Barton on a six-month loan, but the deal was turned down by QPR.

Ahead of the 2012–13 Premier League season, Barton was not given a squad number by QPR. Towards the end of the season, chairman Tony Fernandes identified the loss of Barton as a factor in the club's poor performance and relegation from the Premier League, saying: "We missed Joey. We needed a workhorse midfielder and we tried to get Scott Parker. We missed a real leader."

==== Loan to Marseille ====
Barton completed a season-long loan move to Marseille on 31 August 2012. In September, the LFP confirmed that Barton's 12-match ban would be upheld in French football, restricting Barton to UEFA Europa League football for the first four months of the season. On 20 September, Barton made his debut for the club in an away trip to Fenerbahçe in a UEFA Europa League tie, a match that ended 2–2. Barton scored his first goal for Marseille on 8 November in the 2–2 draw with Borussia Mönchengladbach in Germany, netting directly from a corner kick in the 54th minute.

Barton told ESPN that he would not return to Queens Park Rangers after the loan spell, and he also said that he only joined the club for money because his partner was expecting a child. Following the comments, on 25 November 2012, he made his league debut in a 1–0 home win against Lille. In his third league appearance on 2 December, Barton provided the assists for both Souleymane Diawara's and André Ayew's goals as Marseille defeated Brest 2–1 to remain two points behind leaders Lyon.

On 6 May 2013, Barton was given a two-match suspended ban for describing Thiago Silva of Paris Saint-Germain on Twitter as looking like an "overweight ladyboy". Laurent Davenas, the President of the French Football Federation's National Council of Ethics said that Barton was punished only for making "inappropriate" remarks, and escaped a more severe punishment because his lawyers proved his lack of homophobic intent by showing the committee Barton's appearance in the BBC Three documentary on homophobia in football.

==== Return to Queens Park Rangers ====
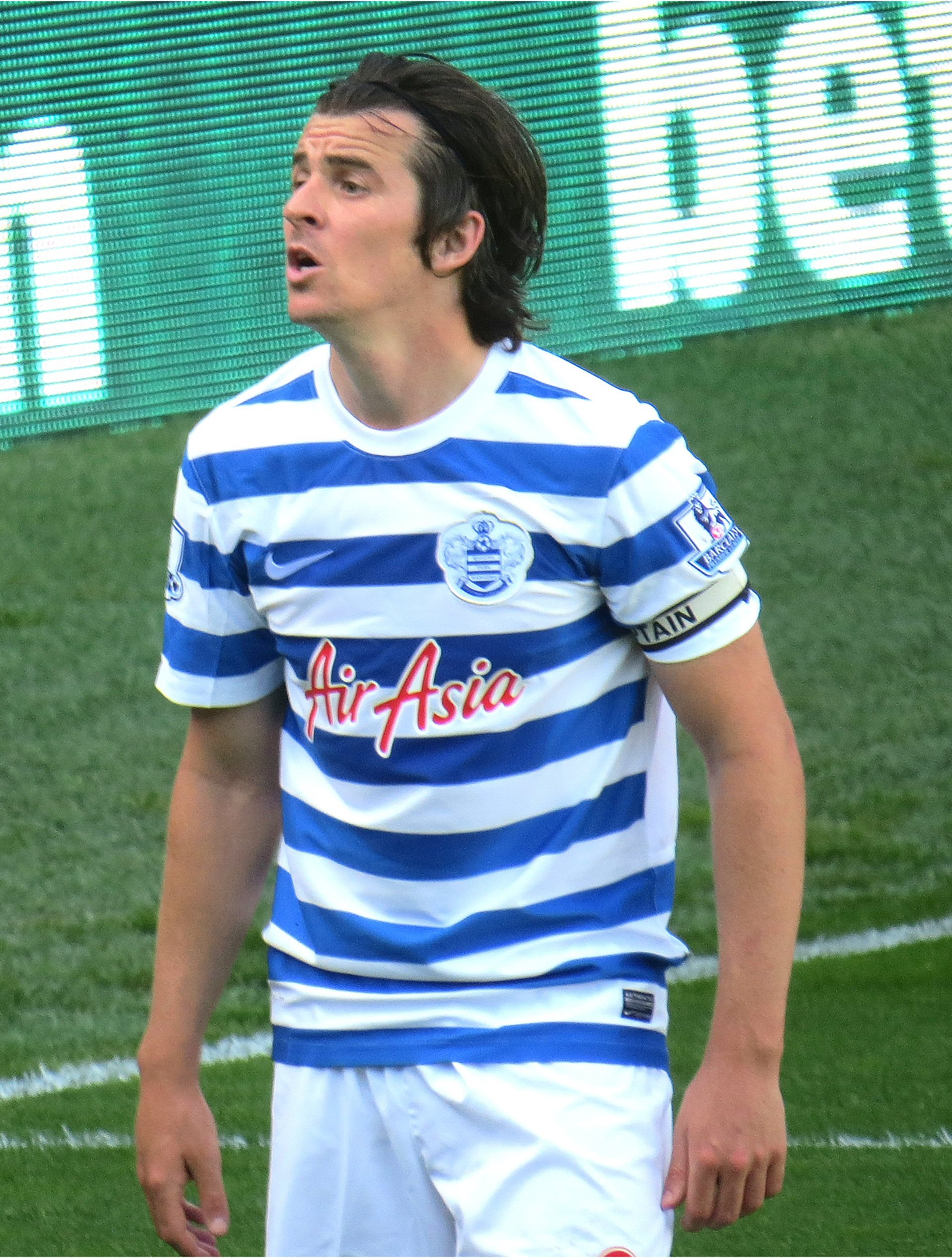
Barton playing for Queens Park Rangers in 2015

Barton returned to QPR for the 2013–14 Championship season, despite posting a series of tweets on 9 April 2013 affirming he would not play for the club again. During a match at Burnley in October, a plastic bottle thrown from the stands hit Barton on the head. He was sent off in QPR's 1–0 home defeat to Leicester City on 21 December 2013, receiving two yellow cards in quick succession for fouling and then throwing the ball in dissent at Gary Taylor-Fletcher. He started for QPR as they beat Derby County 1–0 in the 2014 Championship play-off final at Wembley Stadium on 24 May, a result that saw the club promoted back to the Premier League at the first attempt.

On 21 February 2015, Barton received the ninth red card of his career in the 32nd minute of a match against Hull City after swinging at Tom Huddlestone's groin following a foul by Darnell Furlong. Chris Ramsey suggested that Barton, who would miss the club's next three home matches as a result, would return to anger management therapy following the incident. In May 2015, Queens Park Rangers announced the release of Barton in the summer of 2015.

On 10 August 2015, following his release from Queens Park Rangers, West Ham United were reportedly confident of signing Barton. Two days later, their co-chairman David Gold confirmed that the deal was off after reported protests from some fans unhappy at the prospect of Barton turning out for the Hammers.

=== Burnley and Rangers ===
On 27 August 2015, Barton joined Championship club Burnley on a one-year contract. He was named in the Championship PFA Team of the Year for the 2015–16 season.

On 24 May 2016, Barton joined Scottish Premiership club Rangers on a two-year contract. He made his first appearance for the club as a substitute in Rangers' 2–0 victory over Annan Athletic in the Scottish League Cup on 19 July. In September 2016, Barton was suspended by Rangers for three weeks following a training ground argument with Andy Halliday. On 10 November 2016, Barton had his contract at Rangers terminated with immediate effect.

On 2 January 2017, despite the threat of an FA ban, Barton re-joined Burnley; he made his second debut for the club in a goalless draw with Sunderland in the FA Cup third round. Barton made his league return on 14 January, coming on as a substitute in the 73rd minute and scoring the only goal in a 1–0 win over Southampton five minutes later. On 26 April Barton was banned from football for 18 months after admitting a Football Association charge in relation to betting. Barton was released by Burnley on 23 May 2017. On 27 July 2017, Barton had his ban reduced by almost five months on appeal.

== International career ==
Barton represented the England under-21 team and was part of the squad for their 2004 Uefa European Under-21 Championship qualifiers against Macedonia and Portugal, scoring once against Portugal.

Following impressive form at club level, Barton received his first call-up to the full England squad on 2 February 2007 for a friendly match against Spain, despite his recent criticism of certain members of the England squad for releasing autobiographies after an unimpressive 2006 FIFA World Cup. He had suggested such players had "cashed in" on the national team's lack of success.

Barton later received support over his comments and Steven Gerrard, one of the players whom Barton had criticised, praised him for his honesty. However, Frank Lampard, who had also released an autobiography following the tournament, publicly stated his disapproval. Barton made his international debut on 7 February 2007, replacing Lampard in the 78th minute of the 1–0 defeat to Spain at Old Trafford.

== Style of play ==
Early in his career, Barton mainly played a defensive role, with a game based on tackling and tracking back to shield the defence. As his career has progressed, he has begun to incorporate a more attacking approach to his play, which has resulted in a greater number of goals and assists, and his six goals from midfield made him Manchester City's leading scorer in the 2006–07 season, ahead of strikers Georgios Samaras, Bernardo Corradi, Émile Mpenza and Darius Vassell.

Barton has been described as having a good work ethic and the ability to carry the ball and retain possession for the team. He has been praised for having a good passing range. This aspect of his game has shown improvement since the 2005–06 season, when he began to favour simpler passes over more ambitious ones, and his relatively high pass completion rate can be attributed to this change. Barton's passes have often proved to be crucial; in the past he has led the way in his team's assists.

Barton has been described as the dirtiest player in the Premier League, a style reflected in the high number of fouls he has committed during his career. He received 39 bookings and three red cards during his time at Manchester City. This physical approach was occasionally criticised by Kevin Keegan as excessive.

== Managerial career ==
=== Fleetwood Town ===
League One club Fleetwood Town announced in April 2018 that Barton would take over as manager on 2 June, after the expiration of his ban. He retired from playing upon taking over. His managerial career started with a 1–0 home defeat by AFC Wimbledon on 4 August 2018.

On 13 April 2019, following a 4–2 away defeat to Barnsley, South Yorkshire Police launched an investigation after Barton allegedly assaulted opposition manager Daniel Stendel in the tunnel. In July 2019, Barton was charged with causing actual bodily harm and bailed until 9 October 2019. He pleaded not guilty. Two days later he won the Manager of the Month award. On 6 November 2019, Barton appeared at Sheffield Crown Court, pleading not guilty to a charge of assault occasioning actual bodily harm. A provisional trial date was set for 1 June 2020. On 4 January 2021, the club announced that Barton had left with immediate effect. He left the club with the side 10th in League One. On 6 December 2021, Barton was cleared of assaulting Stendel.

=== Bristol Rovers ===
On 22 February 2021, Barton was appointed manager of Bristol Rovers with the club in a relegation battle, sitting just two points outside of the relegation zone. His first match was a relegation six-pointer against Wigan Athletic that saw Rovers fall to a 2–1 defeat in the final minute of second-half stoppage time. Barton was unable to reverse his side's slip down the table and on 24 April, they were officially relegated following a 1–0 defeat at Portsmouth that saw the club sitting bottom of the league, nine points off of safety with just two matches remaining. Relegation had been all but confirmed the previous match, with Barton again publicly criticising his players in the media, as well as the two managers before him, saying that his team were going down 'with a whimper'.

On 2 October 2021, Barton's Rovers suffered a 3–1 home defeat to a Swindon Town side managed by Ben Garner. This came after Barton had repeatedly criticised his predecessor, calling him "negligent" before repeating to have a number of digs at his opposing manager in the pre-match press conference, saying that he was willing to "spare 15–20 minutes for him after the game" to discuss the finer points of management. Later in October 2021, Barton was criticised by several anti-Semitism campaigners when he compared his team's poor performance in a 3–1 defeat to Newport County to a holocaust. In a post-match interview, Barton had said, "Someone gets in for a game, does well but then has a Holocaust, a nightmare, an absolute disaster". Barton apologised for his comments the following week.

Barton was nominated for the EFL League Two Manager of the Month award for January 2022 after picking up 10 points from four matches across the month, ultimately missing out to Rob Edwards of Forest Green Rovers. Impressive form in 2022 saw Bristol Rovers rise up the table and following a 1–0 home victory over Colchester United on 15 March, Rovers found themselves in the play-off positions for the first time in the season. Barton was named League Two Manager of the Month for March 2022 after leading his side to five wins from seven matches whilst conceding just three goals and pushing for a promotion place. The season finished in dramatic fashion with a 7–0 thrashing on the final day over Scunthorpe United giving Rovers the five goal swing that they required in order to overtake Northampton Town and move into third place, sealing promotion on goals scored. On 1 July 2022, Barton signed a new three-year contract extension.

On 26 October 2023, Barton was dismissed by the club following an indifferent start to the season. Club owner Hussain AlSaeed confirmed that the decision was for purely footballing reasons, the budget afforded to Barton not being representative of the league position of 16th after 13 matches.

== Controversies ==
=== Criminal investigations and convictions ===
In 2006, Merseyside Police investigated after Barton exposed his buttocks to Everton supporters following a game on 30 September. On 4 October, the force announced that it would be taking no further action.

On 13 March 2007, Barton was arrested on suspicion of assault and criminal damage following an altercation with a taxi driver in Liverpool on 4 March. He was cleared of this charge in May 2008, after his cousin, Joshua Wilson, admitted to causing the damage.

On 1 May 2007, Barton assaulted his teammate Ousmane Dabo during a training session. Dabo was hit several times, left unconscious, and hospitalised with head injuries, including a suspected detached retina. On 16 May, Barton was arrested and questioned by Greater Manchester Police, and was later charged with assault. He initially pleaded not guilty, but later changed his plea to guilty. On 1 July 2008, Barton was sentenced to a four-month suspended prison sentence plus 200 hours of community service and ordered to pay £3,000 compensation and Dabo's court costs.

In the early hours of 27 December 2007, Barton was arrested on suspicion of assault in Liverpool city centre. Barton punched a man 20 times, causing him to lose consciousness and then attacked a teenage boy. At the time, Barton was on bail for two previous arrests, and he was denied bail for the third arrest. Barton pleaded guilty to the offence, and, on 20 May 2008, he was sentenced to six months in jail. Barton's cousin Nadine Wilson and his brother Andrew Barton also pleaded guilty to their part in the assaults and received suspended sentences.

In August 2008, Jamie Tandy pursued a civil claim against Barton. Barton had stubbed out a lit cigar in Tandy's eye in 2004 while Tandy was a youth player at Manchester City. Tandy said that the incident caused a "major psychiatric deterioration in his health that has destroyed any chance he may have had of playing professional football at a high level." In November 2009, Barton agreed to pay Tandy £65,000 as part of an out-of-court settlement.

On 4 June 2012, Barton was arrested alongside three other men after a fight outside a nightclub in Liverpool. Barton claimed that he had been "sucker punched" in the incident. The following month, all four men were told they would face no further police action.

On 13 April 2019, South Yorkshire Police launched an investigation after Barton was alleged to have assaulted opposition manager Daniel Stendel in the Oakwell tunnel following a game between Fleetwood Town and Barnsley. In July 2019, Barton was charged with causing actual bodily harm and bailed until 9 October 2019. He pleaded not guilty. On 6 December 2021, Barton was found not guilty of the charge.

In July 2021, Barton was charged with the assault by beating of a woman at an address in Kew, London in June 2021. In March 2022, a court heard that Barton was accused of kicking his wife in the head and grabbing her throat while drunk, the case being adjourned to 23 June due to a late arrival of emails. The case was further delayed until the end of October, Barton's defence team being set a deadline of two weeks to provide the list of witnesses that they would be presenting and say whether or not the alleged victim would be called as a defence witness. The case was dismissed on 31 October on grounds of the impossibility of Barton receiving a fair trial because prosecutors would not call the alleged victim to testify, but the acquittal was reversed on appeal by the prosecution. In March 2025, Barton was found guilty of assault and handed a 12-week suspended prison sentence.

In April 2024, Cheshire Police announced it was investigating Barton after "reports of offences under the Communications Act". The force said it could not comment further about which posts had been reported.

In March 2026, Barton was arrested on suspicion of attacking former Prescot Cables FC manager Kevin Lynch near a golf club in Huyton, Merseyside on 8 March 2026. Barton was subsequently charged with grievous bodily harm with intent and was refused bail. At Liverpool Crown Court on 7 April 2026, Barton denied the assault and was remanded into custody ahead of a seven-day trial scheduled to start on 1 September 2026. In September 2026, the trial was adjourned and rescheduled for March 2027. On 7 September 2026, a renewed application for bail was refused at Liverpool Crown Court, and Barton was further remanded in custody ahead of a pre-trial hearing on 11 December 2026.

=== Defamation claims ===
Jeremy Vine sued Barton for libel over posts on social media site X, where Barton had repeatedly called Vine a "bike nonce". In a preliminary ruling, judge Mrs Justice Steyn, in the High Court, held that the tweets were defamatory at common law, since Barton had combined the term 'nonce', British slang for paedophile, with images of notorious paedophiles such as Jimmy Savile and Jeffrey Epstein, which had the defamatory effect of falsely insinuating that Vine is a paedophile. In settlement, Barton offered to pay £75,000 in damages and to pay Vine's legal expenses. However, Vine stated that the £75,000 plus costs was an offer made at an earlier stage, and subsequently Barton went on to make further defamatory statements, and that the legal process continued in respect of these. To settle the libel claim with Vine, Barton was ordered to pay an additional £35,000.

In January 2024, ITV responded with condemnation to Barton's referring to Eniola Aluko and Lucy Ward as "the Fred and Rose West of football commentary" after they appeared as pundit and co-commentator on an ITV match broadcast. In July 2024 Barton was charged with making malicious communications related to tweets he made concerning Aluko, between 1 and 18 January 2024. Barton had said on his Twitter feed that Aluko had only been hired as a pundit for an England game for "diversity and inclusion quotas". These posts, along with others targeting Vine, led to Barton being found guilty in November 2025 at Liverpool Crown Court of six counts of sending "grossly offensive" messages via social media.

In December 2024, Barton was additionally charged with malicious communication relating to social media posts referring to Jeremy Vine and Lucy Ward.

On 9 April 2025, Aluko won the first stage of a High Court libel claim against Barton. She had appeared to criticise people placed on the government's furlough scheme, for which she apologised. In response, Barton had posted comments suggesting that her private education made her a "hypocrite" and that her late father had been financially corrupt. On 10 March 2026, Aluko won her libel case against Barton in the High Court, winning £339,000 in damages, with Barton also having to pay her legal costs. Barton did not attend the High Court, as he was being held in custody following an assault that took place two days earlier.

== Personal life ==
=== Family ===
Barton's brother Michael Barton was sentenced to life imprisonment (with a tariff of 17 years) for his involvement in the racially motivated murder of Anthony Walker in 2005. Joey made a public appeal to his brother to come forward and help with the police investigation following the attack, and also made a series of calls to Michael, enquiring about his involvement in the incident.

Barton has four children with Georgia McNeil. The couple married in 2019.

=== Charity ===
Barton is a patron of the Tamsin Gulvin Fund, a charity set up to support people who have addiction problems and no financial support. Tony Adams, who had been impressed with Barton's attitude during his involvement in the Sporting Chance Clinic, appointed him to this role. He is a part of the Get Hooked on Fishing campaign, designed to keep children out of trouble by encouraging them to take up fishing. He has also taken part in a celebrity cricket match for charity to help fund a new children's rehabilitation unit at a hospital in Manchester. In 2011, he began writing a regular column in The Big Issue, a street newspaper sold by the homeless and vulnerably housed. In 2012, Barton, along with Robbie Elliott, a former Newcastle United fullback, sponsored a shirt each from Newcastle United's women's team. Barton sponsored the number seven shirt, the number he wore in the men's side. In September 2013, Barton became the first player to wear rainbow laces as part of Stonewall's Rainbow Laces campaign to promote the inclusion of the LGBTQ+ community in sport.

=== Views ===
Barton is a prominent user of Twitter, with over 2.7 million followers as of December 2023. Commenting on figures from Friedrich Nietzsche and George Orwell to Isambard Kingdom Brunel and Morrissey, his eclectic tweets have resulted in him being described by the BBC as "a philosophical sportsman to rival Eric Cantona in his heyday". Others in the media have criticised this description, with Paul Hayward, chief sports writer for The Daily Telegraph, writing that Barton "manages to be patronised [by the media] and held up as some kind of exemplar all at once ... he is skilled at tricking us into watching him veer between the extremes of thinker and thug. Either this is a repudiation of societal hypocrisy or, more likely, indicative of a sociopathic tendency." Ellie Mae O'Hagan of The Guardian commented that "the problem, I think, is not the belief that Barton is a reformed character, but the notion that one cannot possibly be a philosopher and violent at the same time: that quoting philosophy should automatically be taken as a sign of reformation ... In my mind, this all boils down to class snobbery. It is automatically assumed that Barton has violent tendencies because he's a working-class man who has chosen to play football for a living. So when he shows signs of intelligence, it's treated as a sign of reform: intellect is the preserve of the gentlemanly middle-classes."

On 29 May 2014, Barton appeared on the BBC's Question Time discussion programme where, referring to the UK Independence Party (UKIP), he said "If I'm somewhere and there was four really ugly girls, I'm thinking she's not the worst – that's all UKIP are". Barton's comments were criticised as sexist by an audience member, prompting him to apologise on air. Barton has also criticised the participation of women in men's football.

In a television programme broadcast on BBC Three on 30 January 2012, Barton stated his beliefs in support of gay rights, in discussion with presenter Amal Fashanu, niece of Justin Fashanu, who came out as gay in 1990 and was England's only openly gay footballer until 2022. He described lack of any openly gay players in English professional football as "a subject that's quite close to my heart", as his uncle is gay. He stated his belief that there would be an openly gay player "within the next 10 years" and expressed his fear that "certain managers ... will discriminate against people" but that he feels "more fool them, and their lack of social awareness and intelligence" and wants his generation's legacy to "help not only change the game for the better, and change the teams that they played in, but also change the culture and change the society and the football clubs that they played at.

In an article written in The Independent in February 2015, Barton stated that: "If I were Prime Minister I would privatise religion. All public money would be withdrawn from religion. Taxpayers' money will cease to sponsor religion in any and every form." He said that the Church of England should be disestablished. In April of that year, he was appointed an honorary associate of the National Secular Society.

Barton has expressed strongly republican sentiments. In the run-up to the Platinum Jubilee he described the Queen and the monarchy as "an absurd concept".

Barton released his autobiography, No Nonsense, in 2016.

=== Gambling ===
In October 2016, Barton was charged with breaking rules relating to gambling on football matches. He was accused by the Scottish Football Association of placing 44 bets on matches between 1 July and 15 September 2016. In November 2016, he received a one match ban from the SFA. In December 2016, he was charged with misconduct, with the Football Association claiming he had placed 1,260 bets over the past 10 years.

On 26 April 2017, Barton received an 18-month ban from football after admitting a Football Association charge in relation to betting.

== Career statistics ==
=== Club ===
Appearances and goals by club, season and competition
Club	Season	League			National cup (Note: Includes FA Cup and Coupe de France)		League cup (Note: Includes Football League Cup and Scottish League Cup)		Other		Total	
Club	Season	Division	Apps	Goals	Apps	Goals	Apps	Goals	Apps	Goals	Apps	Goals
Manchester City	2002–03	Premier League	7	1	0	0	0	0	—		7	1
Manchester City	2003–04	Premier League	28	1	4	0	2	0	5 (Note: Appearances in UEFA Cup)	0	39	1
Manchester City	2004–05	Premier League	31	1	1	0	1	1	—		33	2
Manchester City	2005–06	Premier League	31	6	5	0	0	0	—		36	6
Manchester City	2006–07	Premier League	33	6	4	1	1	0	—		38	7
Manchester City	Total		130	15	14	1	4	1	5	0	153	17
Newcastle United	2007–08	Premier League	23	1	0	0	0	0	—		23	1
Newcastle United	2008–09	Premier League	9	1	0	0	0	0	—		9	1
Newcastle United	2009–10	Championship	15	1	0	0	0	0	—		15	1
Newcastle United	2010–11	Premier League	32	4	1	1	2	0	—		35	5
Newcastle United	2011–12	Premier League	2	0	—		0	0	—		2	0
Newcastle United	Total		81	7	1	1	2	0	—		84	8
Queens Park Rangers	2011–12	Premier League	31	3	1	0	—		—		32	3
Queens Park Rangers	2012–13	Premier League	0	0	—		0	0	—		0	0
Queens Park Rangers	2013–14	Championship	34	3	1	0	1	0	3 (Note: Appearances in Championship play-offs)	0	39	3
Queens Park Rangers	2014–15	Premier League	28	1	0	0	0	0	—		28	1
Queens Park Rangers	Total		93	7	2	0	1	0	3	0	99	7
Marseille (loan)	2012–13	Ligue 1	25	0	3	0	0	0	5 (Note: Appearances in UEFA Europa League)	1	33	1
Burnley	2015–16	Championship	38	3	2	0	—		—		40	3
Rangers	2016–17	Scottish Premiership	5	0	—		3	0	—		8	0
Burnley	2016–17	Premier League	14	1	4	0	—		—		18	1
Career total			386	33	26	2	10	1	13	1	435	37

=== International ===
Appearances and goals by national team and year
National team	Year	Apps	Goals
England	2007	1	0
Total		1	0

== Managerial statistics ==
As of match played 24 October 2023

Managerial record by team and tenure
Team	From	To	Record				
Team	From	To	P	W	D	L	Win %
Fleetwood Town	2 June 2018	4 January 2021	128	51	36	41	39.8
Bristol Rovers	22 February 2021	26 October 2023	143	53	30	60	37.1
Total			271	104	66	101	38.4

== Honours ==
=== As a player ===
Newcastle United

- Football League Championship: 2009–10

Queens Park Rangers

- Football League Championship play-offs: 2014

Burnley

- Football League Championship: 2015–16

Individual

- Manchester City Young Player of the Year: 2003–04
- The Football League Team of the Season: 2015–16
- Burnley Player of the Year: 2015–16
- PFA Team of the Year: 2015–16 Championship

=== As a manager ===
Bristol Rovers

- EFL League Two third-place promotion: 2021–22

Individual

- EFL League One Manager of the Month: September 2019
- EFL League Two Manager of the Month: March 2022
