= 1980 Southend East by-election =

1980 UK Parliamentary by-election

← 1979	13 March 1980	1983 →

Constituency of Southend East
- Turnout: 62.5%
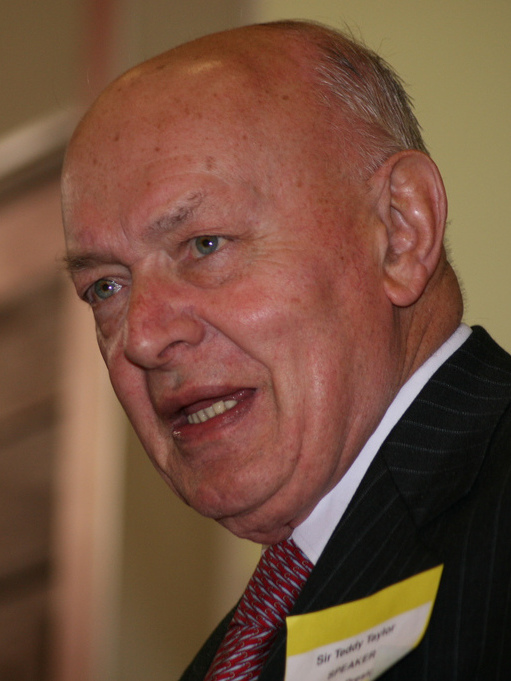
	First party	Second party	Third party
		Lab	Lib
Candidate	Teddy Taylor	Colin George	David Evans
Party	Conservative	Labour	Liberal
Popular vote	13,117	12,687	8,939
Percentage	36.8%	35.6%	25.1%
Swing	▼19.3%	▲6.5%	▲12.0%
MP before election
Stephen McAdden
Conservative
Elected MP
Teddy Taylor
Conservative

The 1980 Southend East by-election of 13 March 1980 was held after the death of Conservative Member of Parliament (MP) Stephen McAdden on 26 December 1979. The seat was narrowly held by the Tories in the by-election.

== Result ==
Southend East by-election, 1980
Party	Candidate	Votes	%	±%
Conservative	Teddy Taylor	13,117	36.8	−19.3
Labour	Colin George	12,687	35.6	+6.5
Liberal	David Evans	8,939	25.1	+12.0
New Britain	Terence Robertson	532	1.5	New
Anti Common-Market Free Trade	Oliver Smedley	207	0.6	New
Independent Liberal	James Curry	132	0.4	New
Democratic Monarchist, Public Safety, White Resident	Bill Boaks	23	0.0	New
Majority		430	1.2	−25.7
Turnout		35,637	62.5	−7.6
Conservative hold		Swing	-12.87	
