= St Thomas Becket Catholic High School =

Coordinates: 53.415°N 2.826°W

Location
- Longview Drive; Liverpool, Merseyside, L36 6EG; England

Information
- Motto: "Simply The Best"
- Religious affiliation: Roman Catholic
- Established: 27 May 1960
- Founder: Archbishop Heenan
- Closed: 23 July 2008
- Local authority: Knowsley Council
- Final Headteacher: M B Quayle
- Final Wing Head: M McDonagh
- Gender: Coeducational
- Age: 11 to 16
- Colour
- Previously known as: St. Augustine of Canterbury Secondary School; Gonzaga Comprehensive School

St Thomas Becket Catholic High School was a Roman Catholic secondary school located in the Huyton area of Liverpool. In its final year, the school had only 90 pupils and 32 members of staff. It closed in July 2008.

== History ==
On 27 May 1960 the first phase of St Augustine of Canterbury Secondary School was opened by Archbishop Heenan, followed by the second phase opening in 1964. Mr Smart was the school's first headteacher. St Aloysius Secondary School of nearby Twig Lane became Gonzaga Comprehensive School in around 1975. Opened by then-Prime Minister and Member of Parliament for Huyton Harold Wilson, Gonzaga remained open for little over a decade.

Following the closure of both schools, St Augustine of Canterbury and Gonzaga Comprehensive merged, reopening on the St Augustine site in March 1987 as St Thomas Becket Catholic High School. This merger was opened and blessed by Archbishop Worlock on 16 March 1987.

== Closure ==
The closure of St Thomas Becket Catholic School was approved on 29 June 2005. From September 2006 onwards, the school became known as "the St Thomas Becket Wing of St Edmund of Canterbury Secondary School". Pupils in years 9, 10 and 11 continued their education on the St Thomas Becket site until the end of year 11. Pupils in year 8 only continued their education on the St Thomas Becket site until the end of year 9 before transferring in 2007 to St Edmund Arrowsmith Catholic High School. As such, the school only had one year group in its final year of teaching.

The school officially closed its doors on 23 July 2008. The school building was demolished in the months following its closure, allowing work to begin on the £16.1m Knowsley Leisure and Culture Park.

== Notable alumni ==
- Joey Barton, footballer
- Tony Hibbert, footballer
- Gillian Keegan, politician
- Peter Reid, footballer, football manager, TV pundit
