= Teddy Taylor =

British politician (1938–2017)

Sir Teddy Taylor
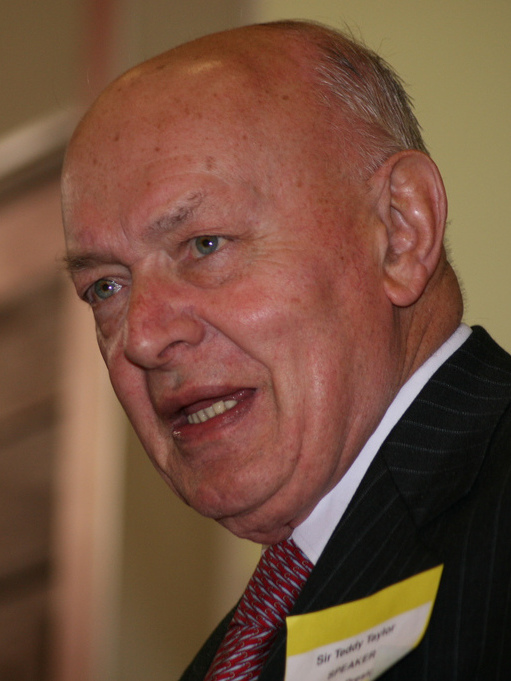
- Teddy Taylor in 2009

Shadow Secretary of State for Scotland
- In office 9 December 1976 – 4 May 1979
- Leader: Margaret Thatcher
- Preceded by: Alick Buchanan-Smith
- Succeeded by: Bruce Millan

Member of Parliament for Southend East and Rochford Southend East (1980–1997)
- In office 13 March 1980 – 11 April 2005
- Preceded by: Sir Stephen McAdden
- Succeeded by: James Duddridge

Member of Parliament for Glasgow Cathcart
- In office 15 October 1964 – 7 April 1979
- Preceded by: John Henderson
- Succeeded by: John Maxton

Personal details
- Born: Edward MacMillan Taylor; 18 April 1937 Glasgow, Scotland
- Died: 20 September 2017 (aged 80) Southend-on-Sea, England
- Party: Conservative
- Other political affiliations: Unionist (until 1965)
- Spouse: Sheila Duncan (m. 1970)
- Children: 2
- Education: University of Glasgow

Sir Edward MacMillan Taylor (18 April 1937 – 20 September 2017), known as Teddy Taylor, was a British Conservative Party politician who was a Member of Parliament (MP) for forty years, from 1964 to 1979 for Glasgow Cathcart and from 1980 to 2005 for Southend East.

He professed Euroscepticism all his life and was a leading member and vice-president of the Conservative Monday Club.

== Early life and career ==
Taylor was born in Glasgow. After being educated at the High School of Glasgow and the University of Glasgow, which he attended with future Labour leader John Smith, he worked as a journalist on the Glasgow Herald and served on Glasgow City Council from 1960. After leaving the Herald he was for five years Industrial Relations Officer with the Clyde Shipbuilders' Association. He fought Glasgow Springburn at the 1959 general election, but lost to Labour's John Forman.

== Parliamentary career ==
He first entered Parliament in the 1964 election as MP for Glasgow Cathcart, following John Henderson's retirement. At the time he was the Baby of the House, as at 27 he was the youngest MP, although not for long as Liberal David Steel entered Parliament five months later at the age of 26. Having served as an opposition MP until 1970, he became a Scottish Office minister in Prime Minister Edward Heath's government. He resigned from this position in July 1971 in protest at the UK joining the European Economic Community, which Heath enthusiastically supported. Because of his strong personal following, he held on to the working-class constituency of Glasgow Cathcart, one of only two Conservative seats in Glasgow in the 1970s, the other being the more affluent Glasgow Hillhead.

As Opposition Front Bench Spokesman on Scottish Affairs, Taylor said in November 1974 that a general directive to the National Coal Board should follow the guidelines of the Social Contract in any wage settlement. He called the Harold Wilson-led Labour government "thoroughly cowardly and hypocritical over the Social Contract" and asked the government spokesman in the House of Commons whether it was "just a sick joke". He was politically close to Margaret Thatcher and served in her shadow cabinet, as Shadow Secretary of State for Scotland.

Whilst he was Shadow Secretary of State for Scotland, the Conservatives stood on a policy staunchly against Scottish devolution. Although Taylor strongly agreed with this, he knew and warned Thatcher that by standing on a platform against devolution, which Labour were promising at the next election, that moderate SNP voters who favoured devolution but not necessarily independence would switch to Labour, hence endangering Taylor's marginal seat, which he had held by 1,757 votes in October 1974. He was expected to become Thatcher's Secretary of State for Scotland if he had held his seat at the 1979 election. Twenty years later, during a Commons debate on devolution in 1999 at the prelude of the Scottish Parliament, he said: "Unfortunately, as I warned Lady Thatcher, making the SNP vote disappear meant that the then Member of Parliament for Glasgow, Cathcart had to disappear as well. However, it was a good bargain for Scotland to get rid of the SNP and devolution, even if it meant that I had to go as well." In any case, he was back in Parliament within a year of his defeat, although he would never serve in government.

=== Monday Club ===
He was a leading and early (pre-1966) young member of the old Conservative Monday Club, and was on the platform at the Club's very successful rally at the Scottish Conservative Party's annual conference at Perth on 17 May 1968. He was first co-opted onto the Club's Executive Council on 9 September 1968.

The Club long campaigned for the restoration of hanging and Taylor sought leave to introduce a bill in Parliament in October 1974 to restore capital punishment. The following January, referring to the murder of a London policeman by a Provisional Irish Republican Army gunman, he said that "the answer was return of capital punishment" and added that "if the police want arms, no government could now refuse".

Teddy Taylor was listed in a Club circular as one of its members standing for Parliament in the General Election on 9 June 1983, for Southend East, and was elected deputy Chairman of the Club on 23 June that year. He consistently opposed the EEC and the EU and campaigned for the UK to leave. He was a leading campaigner against joining the euro and had also campaigned against metrication. Throughout his career he fought hard for the interests of British fishermen. He was on the editorial board that prepared the Club's October 1985 Conservative Party Conference issue of their newspaper, Right Ahead, to which he contributed a lengthy article entitled "How Tories Are Subsidising the Soviet War Machine." In the mid-1980s he said, "Nelson Mandela should be shot." On 30 March 1990, he was the guest speaker at the Club's Surrey branch 21st Anniversary Dinner and was still a Vice-President in 1992. He was guest-of-honour at the South East Essex Monday Club's Annual Dinner on 4 July 1997.

=== Change of seats ===
At the 1979 election, Scotland bucked the British trend by showing a slight swing from Conservative to Labour, and Taylor lost his seat, the only Conservative MP at that election (other than by-election victors) to do so. He had been widely expected to become the Secretary of State for Scotland. Taylor re-entered Parliament at a 1980 by-election for Southend East following the death of Stephen McAdden and, from the 1997 general election, represented Rochford and Southend East. He did not serve in government following his return but received a knighthood in 1991.

Prior to being selected to fight the Southend by-election, Taylor had been a candidate for the Rectorship of the University of Dundee. He was a favourite to win but pulled out of the election at the last minute to contest the parliamentary seat.

During John Major's government, he was one of the Maastricht Rebels and was temporarily expelled from the parliamentary party, although he was later reinstated. Taylor stood down at the 2005 general election.

== Later life ==
In 1968 Taylor published a novel entitled Hearts of Stone.

Taylor was interviewed in 2012 as part of The History of Parliament's oral history project. Taylor campaigned for a 'leave' vote in the 2016 United Kingdom European Union membership referendum.

In 1996 the US industrial metal band Ministry released the album Filth Pig, which derives its name from Taylor describing the band's singer Al Jourgensen as a "filthy pig" in the Houses of Parliament.

== Personal life and death ==
In 1970, Taylor married Sheila Duncan, and they had three children.

Taylor was a fan of Bob Marley.

Taylor's health declined at the end of his life due to Alzheimer's disease and chronic obstructive pulmonary disease. He was a heavy smoker. He died from complications of pneumonia and septicaemia at Southend University Hospital on 20 September 2017, at the age of 80.

== Sources ==
- Copping, Robert, The Monday Club – Crisis and After, Current Affairs Information Service, Ilford, Essex, May 1975, (P/B), pps: 17, 20, 22
- Taylor, Teddy, MP, and David Storey, The Conservative Party & The Common Market, published by the Conservative Monday Club, July 1982, (P/B)
- Taylor, Teddy, MP, Proposals to Rescue the British Fishing Industry, Monday Club Policy Paper, December 1982
- Taylor, Teddy, MP, "How Tories Are Subsidising the Soviet War Machine", in Right Ahead newspaper published by the Conservative Monday Club, October 1985 Conservative Party Conference issue
- Taylor, Teddy, MP, "The EEC – The Other Side of the Coin", in Right Ahead newspaper published by the Conservative Monday Club, October 1989 Conservative Party Conference issue

Parliament of the United Kingdom
Preceded by John Henderson	Member of Parliament for Glasgow Cathcart; 1964 – 1979	Succeeded by John Maxton
Preceded by Sir Stephen McAdden	Member of Parliament for Southend East; 1980 – 1997	Constituency abolished
New constituency	Member of Parliament for Southend East and Rochford; 1997 – 2005	Succeeded by James Duddridge
Honorary titles
Preceded by Paul Channon	Baby of the House; 1964 – 1965	Succeeded by David Steel
