= Gillian Keegan =

British politician (born 1968)

The Right Honourable Gillian Keegan
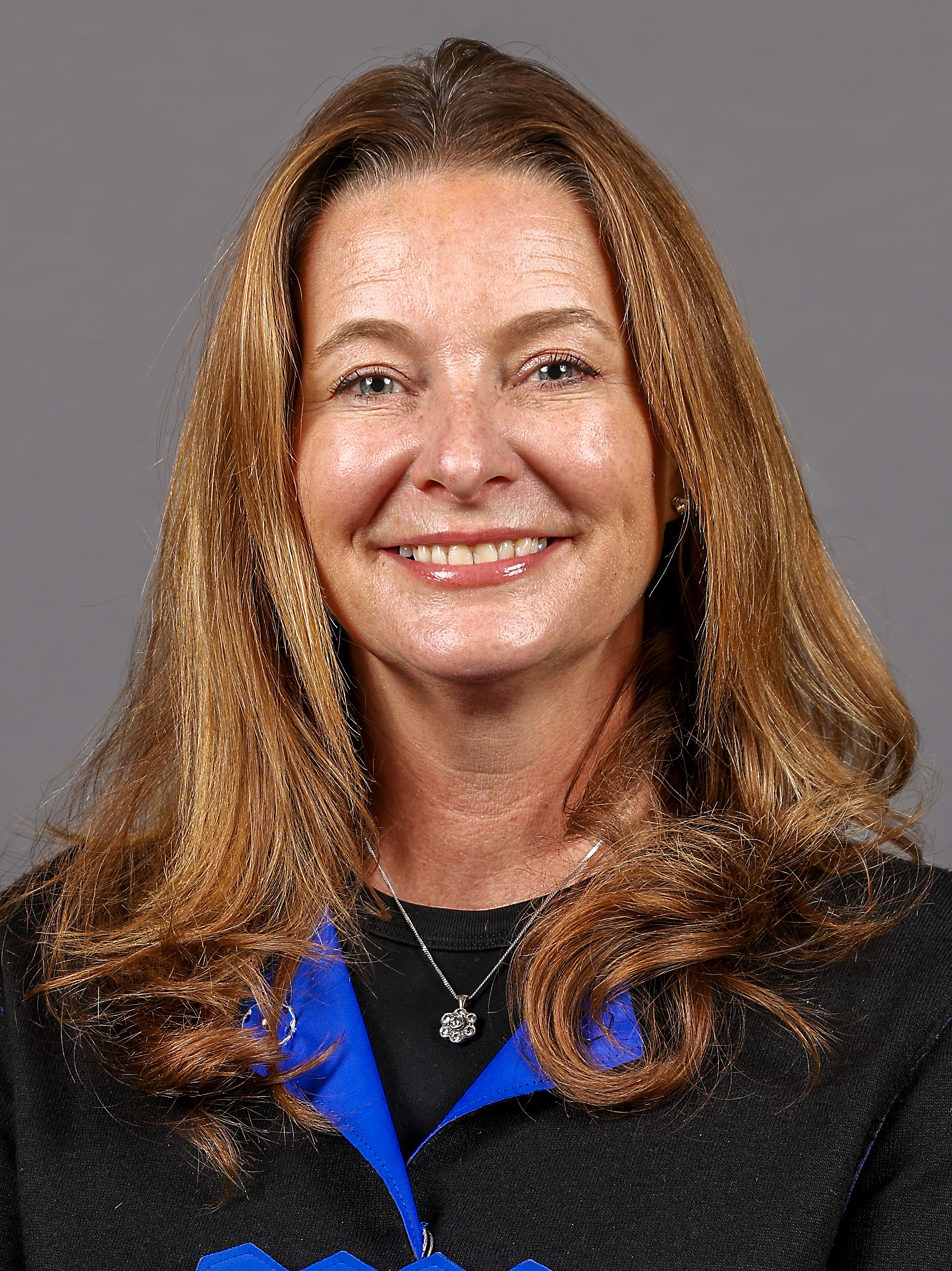
- Official portrait, 2022

Secretary of State for Education
- In office 25 October 2022 – 5 July 2024
- Prime Minister: Rishi Sunak
- Preceded by: Kit Malthouse
- Succeeded by: Bridget Phillipson
Junior ministerial offices 2020–2022
Parliamentary Under-Secretary of State for Africa
In office 8 September 2022 – 25 October 2022
Prime Minister	Liz Truss
Preceded by	Vicky Ford
Succeeded by	Andrew Mitchell (Note: As Minister of State for Development and Africa.)
Minister of State for Care and Mental Health
In office 16 September 2021 – 7 September 2022
Prime Minister	Boris Johnson
Preceded by	Helen Whately (Note: As Minister of State for Social Care.); Nadine Dorries (Note: As Minister of State for Patient Safety, Suicide Prevention and Mental Health.)
Succeeded by	Robert Jenrick (Note: As Minister of State for Health.); Caroline Johnson (Note: As Parliamentary Under-Secretary of State for Mental Health and Public Health.)
Parliamentary Under-Secretary of State for Apprenticeships and Skills
In office 14 February 2020 – 16 September 2021
Prime Minister	Boris Johnson
Preceded by	Anne Milton
Succeeded by	Alex Burghart

Member of Parliament for Chichester
- In office 8 June 2017 – 30 May 2024
- Preceded by: Andrew Tyrie
- Succeeded by: Jess Brown-Fuller

Member of Chichester District Council for Rogate
- In office 23 October 2014 – 12 April 2018
- Preceded by: John Kingston
- Succeeded by: Kate O'Kelly

Personal details
- Born: Gillian Gibson; 13 March 1968 (age 58) Leigh, Lancashire, England
- Party: Conservative
- Spouse: Dr Michael Keegan
- Children: 2
- Relatives: Denis Keegan (father-in-law)
- Education: Liverpool John Moores University (BSc); London Business School (MSc)
- Website: gilliankeegan.com

Gillian Keegan (née Gibson; born 13 March 1968) is a British politician who served as Secretary of State for Education from 2022 to 2024. She previously served as Parliamentary Under-Secretary of State for Apprenticeships and Skills from 2020 to 2021, Minister of State for Care and Mental Health from 2021 to 2022, Parliamentary Under-Secretary of State for Africa from September to October 2022. A member of the Conservative Party, Keegan served as the Member of Parliament (MP) for Chichester from 2017 to 2024.

She was appointed Parliamentary Under-Secretary of State for Apprenticeships and Skills in the February 2020 reshuffle by Boris Johnson. In the 2021 cabinet reshuffle, Johnson promoted her to Minister of State for Care and Mental Health. She was demoted to Parliamentary Under-Secretary of State for Africa when Liz Truss was appointed prime minister in September 2022. In October 2022, she was appointed Secretary of State for Education by new prime minister Rishi Sunak, a position she held until the 2024 general election, in which she was unseated by Jess Brown-Fuller of the Liberal Democrats.

== Early life and education ==
Gillian Gibson was born in Leigh, Lancashire, to an office manager father and a mother who did secretarial work. She went to primary school in Yorkshire, and grew up in Knowsley, Merseyside, going to St Augustine of Canterbury Secondary School in Huyton. She was the only pupil to get 10 O-Levels at her school. Keegan started her career aged 16 as an apprentice at the AC Delco motor vehicle components factory in Kirkby.

She then studied Business Studies at Liverpool John Moores University, graduating with a bachelor's degree. Keegan also graduated with a Master of Science in Strategy and Leadership (Sloan Fellowship), from the London Business School in 2011.

After university, Keegan had a business career working at Delco Electronics (part of the General Motors Group), NatWest Bank (senior buyer), MasterCard International (commercial director), Amadeus IT Group (group vice president of Multinational Customer Group based in Madrid) and Travelport (chief marketing officer) for over 27 years.

== Political career ==
Keegan has said that it was her experiences of trade unionism and the Militant-controlled Liverpool City Council while working in Kirkby in her youth during the 1980s that convinced her to support the Conservative Party. However, she did not become active in politics until 2014. In 2015, she was advised to become an MP by Justine Greening, whom she had met at a London Business School (LBS) reunion. Keegan has said that this demonstrated the power of the LBS network.

Keegan was elected as a councillor for the Rogate ward on Chichester District Council in 2014. She was appointed cabinet member for commercial services in May 2015. She stood down as a councillor in February 2018, once elected to Parliament.

At the 2015 general election, Keegan stood in St Helens South and Whiston, coming second with 15.9% of the vote behind the Labour candidate Marie Rimmer.

After the election, she became director of Women2Win—an organisation founded by Theresa May and Anne Jenkin, Baroness Jenkin of Kennington in 2005 to help elect more women Conservative MPs to Parliament. She left the position in September 2017, having been elected to Parliament.

== Parliamentary career ==
Keegan was selected as the Conservative Parliamentary candidate for Chichester in May 2017. At the snap 2017 general election, she was elected to Parliament as MP for Chichester with 60.1% of the vote and a majority of 22,621. She is the constituency's first female MP.

In September 2017, she was appointed to the Public Accounts Committee.

In February 2019, Keegan was appointed as MP Apprenticeship Ambassador by Anne Milton, with responsibility to support apprenticeship schemes and promote them both within Parliament and to businesses within the UK, working alongside the Apprenticeship Ambassador Network consisting of various advocates of apprenticeship schemes.

Keegan endorsed Rory Stewart during the 2019 Conservative Party leadership election.

At the 2019 general election, Keegan was re-elected as MP for Chichester with a decreased vote share of 57.8% and a decreased majority of 21,490. However, at the 2024 general election, Chichester had the third largest Conservative to Liberal Democrat swing in the country, with an increase of 28.9% for the Liberal Democrats, leaving her in second place with a decreased vote share of 25.7%.

=== Junior ministerial roles ===
Keegan was appointed Parliamentary Private Secretary (PPS) to HM Treasury in September 2018. In January 2019, she became PPS to the Secretary of State for Defence. She became PPS to the Home Secretary in May 2019. She became PPS to the Secretary of State for Health and Social Care in September 2019.

In February 2020, Keegan was appointed Parliamentary Under-Secretary of State for Apprenticeships and Skills, a junior ministerial role at the Department for Education, and was the first former apprentice to hold the office.

In August 2020, Keegan was criticised for being on holiday during the GCSE and A-level grading controversy. She defended herself by stating that she was not the minister responsible for A-level and GCSE qualifications. She said that although she had been the duty minister for the first two weeks of summer recess, she had obtained special permission to take her government computer with her to continue working during this period.

In the September 2021 reshuffle, Keegan was appointed Minister of State for Care and Mental Health. Following Boris Johnson's resignation as prime minister, Keegan released a statement in which she praised the prime minister's leadership.

Keegan endorsed Rishi Sunak in the July–September 2022 Conservative Party leadership election and was subsequently demoted when Liz Truss became prime minister in September 2022, serving as Parliamentary Under-Secretary of State for Africa.

=== Education Secretary ===
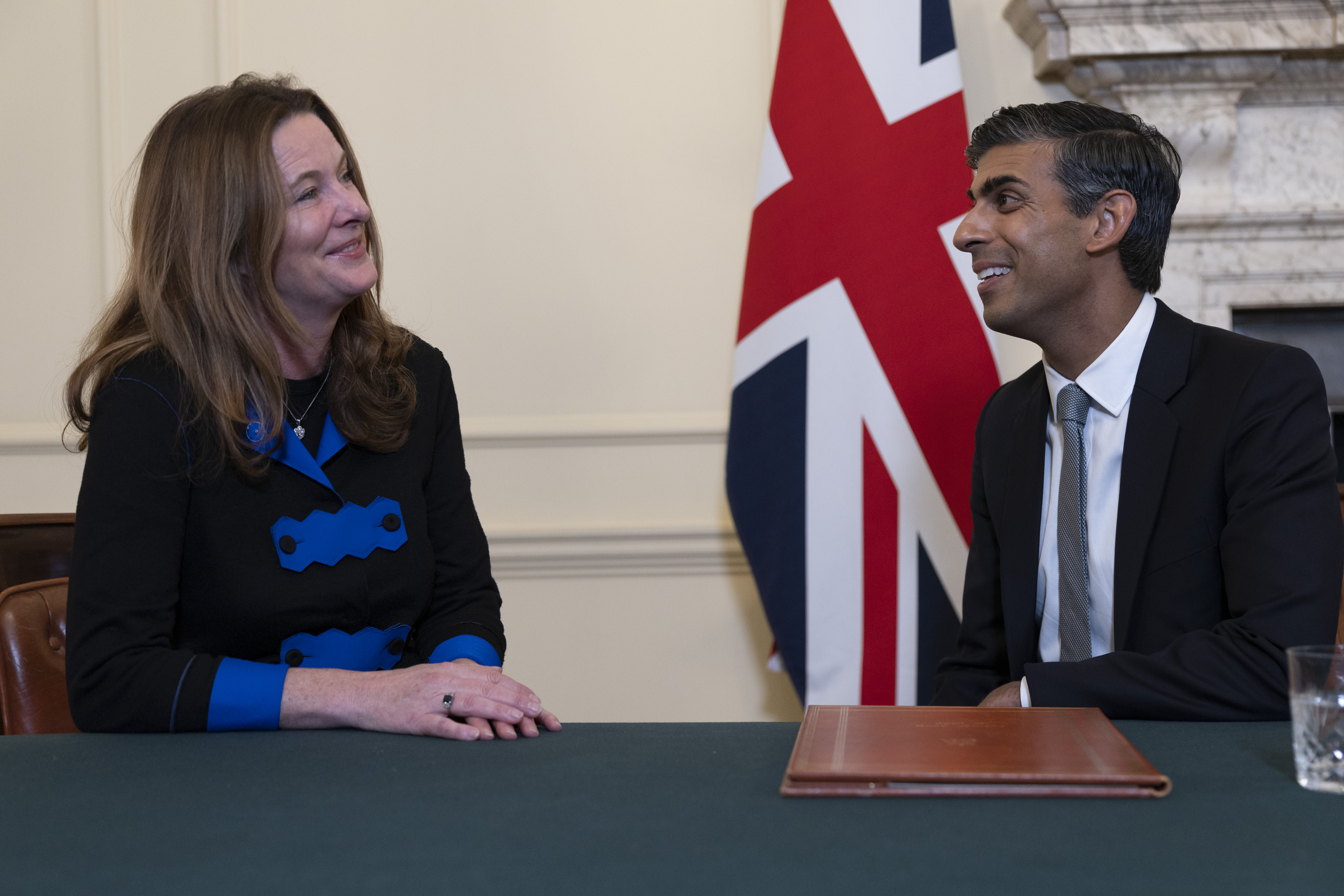
Prime Minister Rishi Sunak meets Secretary of State for Education Gillian Keegan in 2022.

Keegan again endorsed Sunak in the October 2022 Conservative Party leadership election and was appointed Secretary of State for Education. She was sworn as a member of the Privy Council on 27 October 2022.

On 5 January 2023, Keegan represented the British government at the funeral of Pope Benedict XVI.

In July 2023, Keegan was reported to have suggested that headteachers should collect absent pupils from home in order to return them to school. This led to criticism from some school leaders.

Following an interview on 4 September 2023 with ITV News about the RAAC crisis in a number of schools in England, Keegan, believing the recording had ended, remarked: "Does anyone ever say 'you know what, you've done a fucking good job [be]cause everyone else has sat on their arse and done nothing'? No signs of that, no?". She later apologised for using profanity and described it as "off the cuff" and "unnecessary". Keegan said that she did not expect to be personally thanked for her performance and that it was instead a reference to the Department for Education's "leadership role" in the crisis. Earlier that day, it was revealed that the DfE had spent £32 million refurbishing its office space in Whitehall. During an interview, Keegan appeared to be unaware of these costs.

== Personal life ==
Keegan lives in Petworth in West Sussex with her second husband, Michael, and has two stepsons.

Michael Keegan is a former Head of Fujitsu UK and Ireland, appointed in 2014. He later had a role as a crown representative to the Cabinet Office, managing cross-government relationships with BAE Systems as a strategic supplier to the Government. In January 2024 he voluntarily resigned from his part-time government role during a period of intense scrutiny into the role of Fujitsu and its Horizon software in the Post Office Scandal.

Keegan and her husband jointly own a house in Petworth, a flat in London, a property in France and a house in Andalusia, Spain.

== Notes ==
Parliament of the United Kingdom
Preceded by Andrew Tyrie	Member of Parliament for Chichester; 2017–2024	Succeeded by Jess Brown-Fuller
Political offices
Preceded by Anne Milton	Parliamentary Under-Secretary of State for Apprenticeships and Skills; 2020–2021	Succeeded by Alex Burghart
Preceded by Helen Whately; As Minister of State for Social Care; Nadine Dorries; As Minister of State for Patient Safety, Suicide Prevention and Mental Health	Minister of State for Care and Mental Health; 2021–2022	Vacant
Preceded by Vicky Ford as Parliamentary Under-Secretary of State for Africa, Latin America and the Caribbean	Parliamentary Under-Secretary of State for Africa; 2022	Vacant
Preceded by Kit Malthouse	Secretary of State for Education; 2022–2024	Succeeded by Bridget Phillipson
