= Southend East (constituency) =

Parliamentary constituency in the United Kingdom, 1950–1997

- Former borough constituency for the House of Commons
- Southend East, showing boundaries used from 1983 to 1997
- County: Essex
- Major settlements: Southend-on-Sea, Shoeburyness

1950–1997
- Seats: One
- Created from: Southend and South East Essex
- Replaced by: Rochford and Southend East

Southend East was a parliamentary constituency in Essex. It returned one Member of Parliament (MP) to the House of Commons of the Parliament of the United Kingdom.

== History ==
The constituency was created for the 1950 general election under the Representation of the People Act 1948, when the Parliamentary Borough of Southend-on-Sea was split in two. It was abolished for the 1997 general election when it was replaced by Rochford and Southend East.

Southend East was a mostly safe Conservative seat throughout its existence, although their majority was just over 500 votes from Labour in 1966, and at the by-election in 1980 when the Conservatives held the seat by only 430 votes, again with Labour in second place. From this by-election until its abolition, Southend East was held by the Conservative Teddy Taylor.

== Boundaries and boundary changes ==
1950–1955

- The County Borough of Southend-on-Sea wards of All Saints, Pier, Shoebury, Southchurch, and Thorpe; and
- The Rural District of Rochford.

Formed primarily from eastern parts of the abolished Parliamentary Borough of Southend-on-Sea. The Rural District of Rochford and the former Urban District of Shoeburyness (which had been absorbed by the County Borough of Southend-on-Sea) had previously been part of the abolished South-Eastern Division of Essex.

1955–1983

- The County Borough of Southend-on-Sea wards of All Saints, Milton, Pier, Shoebury, Southchurch, Temple Sutton, Thorpe and Victoria.

Realignment of boundary with Southend West. The Rural District of Rochford was transferred back to the re-established constituency of South East Essex.

1983–1997

- The Borough of Southend-on-Sea wards of Milton, St Luke's, Shoebury, Southchurch, Thorpe, and Victoria.

Marginal changes following the redistribution of wards in the Borough of Southend-on-Sea.

The constituency included Southend town centre, and parts of the Borough of Southend to the east.

In 1997, Southend East was abolished and expanded to the north to include the town of Rochford once again, forming the new constituency of Rochford and Southend East.

== Members of Parliament ==
Election	Member	Party	Notes
1950	Stephen McAdden	Conservative	Died December 1979
1980 by-election	Teddy Taylor	Conservative	Subsequently, MP for Rochford and Southend East 1997–2005
1997	constituency abolished: see Rochford and Southend East		

== Elections ==
=== Elections in the 1950s ===
General election 1950: Southend East
Party	Candidate	Votes	%	±%
Conservative	Stephen McAdden	20,395	47.1	
Labour	Rubeigh James Minney	18,230	42.2	
Liberal	John Greig Runciman	4,616	10.7	
Majority		2,165	4.9	
Turnout		43,241	82.5	
Conservative win (new seat)				

General election 1951: Southend East
Party	Candidate	Votes	%	±%
Conservative	Stephen McAdden	24,088	55.3	+8.2
Labour	Leslie Merrion	19,478	44.7	+2.5
Majority		4,610	10.6	+5.7
Turnout		43,566	80.6	−1.9
Conservative hold		Swing	+2.8	

General election 1955: Southend East
Party	Candidate	Votes	%	±%
Conservative	Stephen McAdden	23,958	58.2	+2.9
Labour	William Harold Clough	17,200	41.8	−2.9
Majority		6,758	16.4	+5.8
Turnout		41,158	74.0	−6.6
Conservative hold		Swing	+2.9	

General election 1959: Southend East
Party	Candidate	Votes	%	±%
Conservative	Stephen McAdden	24,712	59.3	+1.1
Labour	Eric James Trevett	16,987	40.7	−1.1
Majority		7,725	18.6	+2.2
Turnout		41,699	75.5	+1.5
Conservative hold		Swing	+1.0	

=== Elections in the 1960s ===
General election 1964: Southend East
Party	Candidate	Votes	%	±%
Conservative	Stephen McAdden	19,775	46.6	−12.7
Labour	Eric James Trevett	16,408	38.6	−2.1
Liberal	David E Evans	6,296	14.8	New
Majority		3,367	8.0	−10.6
Turnout		42,479	76.2	+0.7
Conservative hold		Swing	−5.3	

General election 1966: Southend East
Party	Candidate	Votes	%	±%
Conservative	Stephen McAdden	19,125	45.3	−1.3
Labour	Peter R Clyne	18,608	44.1	+5.5
Liberal	Keith W Baynes	4,495	10.6	−4.2
Majority		517	1.2	−6.8
Turnout		42,228	76.9	+0.7
Conservative hold		Swing	−3.3	

=== Elections in the 1970s ===
General election 1970: Southend East
Party	Candidate	Votes	%	±%
Conservative	Stephen McAdden	24,025	58.5	+13.2
Labour	Peter R Clyne	17,065	41.5	−2.6
Majority		6,960	16.9	+15.7
Turnout		41,090	71.2	−5.7
Conservative hold		Swing	+5.3	

General election February 1974: Southend East
Party	Candidate	Votes	%	±%
Conservative	Stephen McAdden	19,600	44.3	−14.2
Labour	Motel Burstin	14,648	33.1	−8.4
Liberal	James Walter John Curry	9,979	22.6	New
Majority		4,952	11.2	−5.7
Turnout		44,227	77.8	+6.5
Conservative hold		Swing	−2.9	

General election October 1974: Southend East
Party	Candidate	Votes	%	±%
Conservative	Stephen McAdden	18,083	45.9	+1.6
Labour	Susan Katharine Ward	13,480	34.2	+1.1
Liberal	James Walter John Curry	7,856	19.9	−2.7
Majority		4,603	11.7	+0.5
Turnout		39,419	68.8	−9.0
Conservative hold		Swing	+0.2	

General election 1979: Southend East
Party	Candidate	Votes	%	±%
Conservative	Stephen McAdden	22,413	56.1	+10.2
Labour	Anthony Nicholas Wright	11,639	29.1	−5.1
Liberal	James Hugill	5,244	13.1	−6.8
National Front	Patrick Edward Twomey	676	1.7	New
Majority		10,774	27.0	+15.3
Turnout		39,972	70.1	+1.3
Conservative hold		Swing	+7.6	

1980 Southend East by-election
Party	Candidate	Votes	%	±%
Conservative	Teddy Taylor	13,117	36.8	−19.3
Labour	Colin George	12,687	35.6	+6.5
Liberal	David E Evans	8,939	25.1	+12.0
New Britain	Terence Robertson	532	1.5	New
Anti Common-Market Free Trade	Oliver Smedley	207	0.6	New
Independent Liberal	James Curry	132	0.4	New
Democratic Monarchist, Public Safety, White Resident	Bill Boaks	23	0.0	New
Majority		430	1.2	−25.8
Turnout		35,637	62.5	−7.6
Conservative hold		Swing	−12.87	

=== Elections in the 1980s ===
General election 1983: Southend East
Party	Candidate	Votes	%	±%
Conservative	Teddy Taylor	21,743	55.8	−0.3
SDP	Colin George	11,052	28.3	N/A
Labour	Conor O'Brien	6,188	15.9	−13.2
Majority		10,691	27.5	+0.5
Turnout		38,983	67.6	−2.5
Conservative hold		Swing	−7.8	

General election 1987: Southend East
Party	Candidate	Votes	%	±%
Conservative	Teddy Taylor	23,573	58.0	+2.2
SDP	Humphry Berkeley	9,906	24.2	−4.1
Labour	David Scully	7,296	17.8	+1.9
Majority		13,847	33.8	+6.3
Turnout		40,955	69.3	+1.7
Conservative hold		Swing	+3.2	

=== Elections in the 1990s ===
General election 1992: Southend East
Party	Candidate	Votes	%	±%
Conservative	Teddy Taylor	24,591	58.8	+0.8
Labour	Graham Bramley	11,480	27.4	+9.6
Liberal Democrats	Jackie Horne	5,107	12.2	−12.0
Liberal	Brian Lynch	673	1.6	New
Majority		13,111	31.4	−2.4
Turnout		41,851	73.8	+4.5
Conservative hold		Swing		

== See also ==
- Parliamentary constituencies in Essex
