= Bayo Alaba =

British politician

Bayo Alaba MP
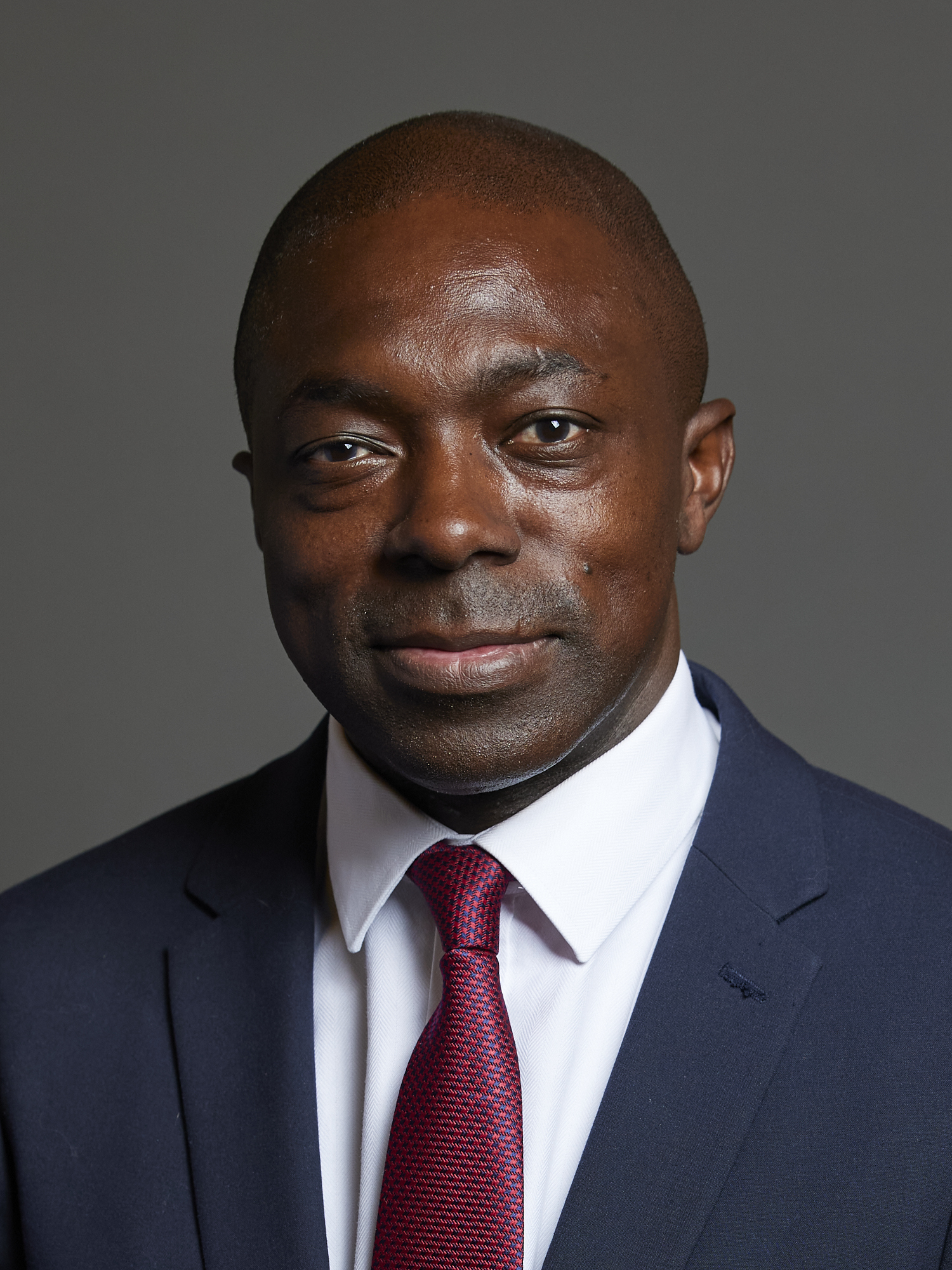
- Official portrait, 2024

Member of Parliament for Southend East and Rochford
- Incumbent
- Assumed office 4 July 2024
- Preceded by: James Duddridge
- Majority: 4,027 (10.1%)

Member of Redbridge London Borough Council for Wanstead Park
- In office 5 May 2022 – 17 September 2024

Personal details
- Born: Adebayo Alaba
- Party: Independent (since 2026)
- Other political affiliations: Labour (until 2026) (Note: Membership suspended.)
- Children: 3
- Education: Coventry University; London School of Economics

Adebayo Alaba is a British politician who has been the Member of Parliament (MP) for Southend East and Rochford since 2024. He has sat as an independent MP since he was suspended from the Labour Party on 17 August 2026.

== Early life and career ==
Alaba is from the Forest Gate area of London and is of Nigerian descent.

He earned a bachelor's degree in manufacturing and business from Coventry University in 1995. He later studied social politics at the London School of Economics in 2011.

Alaba is a former reservist paratrooper. In 2024, he was airdropped to Normandy as part of the commemorations for the 80th anniversary of the Normandy landings.

Prior to being an MP, he was a councillor for Wanstead Park ward on Redbridge London Borough Council from 2022 to his resignation in 2024.

== Parliamentary career ==
Alaba won the seat from the Conservatives with a 19% swing, the first time they had lost it since the seat was created in 1997. He was elected as a member of the Culture, Media and Sport Select Committee on 21 October 2024.

He is a member of the Fabian Society's executive committee.

In August 2026, he was suspended from the Labour Party over questions about taxpayer-funded COVID-19 bounceback loans he had received.

== Personal life ==
Alaba is married and is a father of three. He owns seven rental properties.
