= Stephen McAdden =

British politician (1907–1979)

Sir Stephen James McAdden CBE (3 November 1907 – 26 December 1979) was a British Conservative politician.

McAdden was educated at the Salesian School, Battersea and worked as an export sales manager and company director. He was a councillor on Hackney Borough Council from 1934 to 1945, Woodford Borough Council from 1945 to 1948, and Essex County Council from 1947 to 1948.

McAdden was elected member of parliament for Southend East in 1950, and remained in office until he died at a hospital in London on 26 December 1979, aged 72. He had fallen down a flight of stairs at Westminster tube station on 21 December. His successor at the resulting by-election in March 1980 was Teddy Taylor, who had lost his seat at the previous year's general election.

== Sources ==
- Times Guide to the House of Commons, 1950, 1966, 1979 and 1983 editions
- Leigh Rayment's Peerage Pages
