= Southend East and Rochford =

UK Parliament constituency (since 1997)

Coordinates: 51.55°N 0.81°E

- County constituency for the House of Commons
- Interactive map of boundaries since 2024
- Location within the East of England
- County: Essex
- Electorate: 70,094 (March 2020)
- Major settlements: Prittlewell, Rochford, Shoeburyness, Southend, Thorpe Bay

Current constituency
- Created: 1997
- Member of Parliament: Bayo Alaba (Independent)
- Seats: One
- Created from: Southend East, Rochford

Southend East and Rochford is a constituency (Note: A county constituency (for the purposes of election expenses and type of returning officer).) in Essex represented in the House of Commons of the UK Parliament since 2024 by Bayo Alaba, a member of the Labour Party who sits as an independent after being suspended in August 2026. (Note: As with all constituencies, the constituency elects one Member of Parliament (MP) by the first past the post system of election at least every five years.)

Prior to the 2023 review of Westminster constituencies, coming into effect at the 2024 general election, the constituency was known as Rochford and Southend East.

== Constituency profile ==
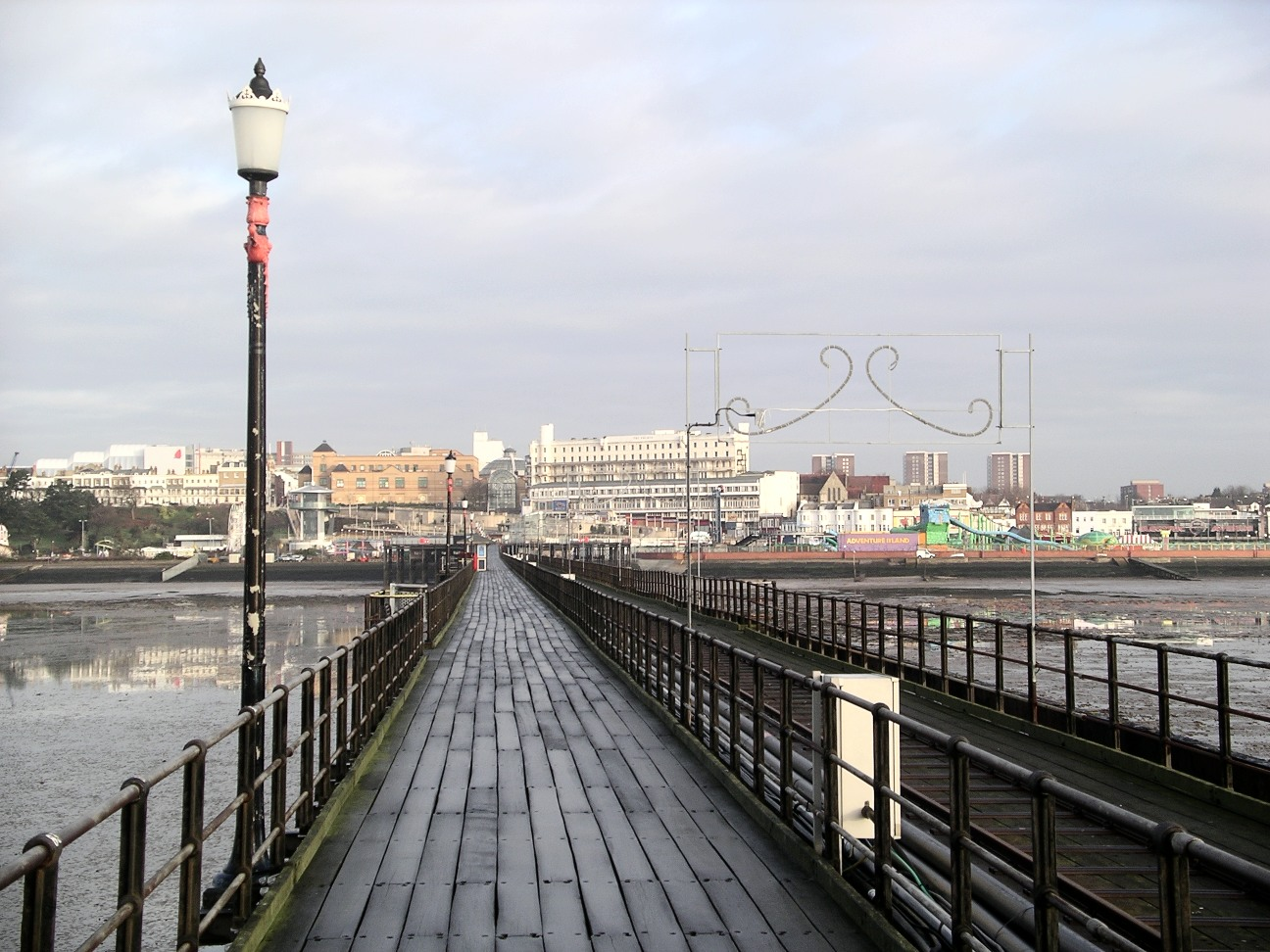
Southend-on-Sea viewed from Southend Pier

Southend East and Rochford is a constituency in Essex in the East of England. It covers the central and eastern areas of the city of Southend-on-Sea, including Southchurch and the town of Shoeburyness, as well as Rochford town centre and the village of Great Wakering.

Southend is a seaside resort city. It was a small fishing village until the early 19th century when it was developed for tourism. The city is home to Southend Pier, the longest pleasure pier in the world. Shoeburyness was a separate coastal town that was absorbed into Southend's suburban expansion in the 1930s. Like many of England's east coast settlements, this area suffered from the late-20th-century decline in domestic tourism. Southend city centre is highly-deprived with most residents living in dense flats or shared homes. There is also some deprivation in Rochford and Shoeburyness whilst Southchurch is an affluent suburban area. House prices across the constituency are generally similar to the regional and UK averages.

Residents of Southend East and Rochford have a similar age profile to the rest of the country. They have below-average levels of income and homeownership, and the child poverty rate is in line with the overall UK figure. Residents have low levels of education and a high proportion work in the retail and tourism sectors. The percentage claiming unemployment benefits is high. White people made up 88% of the population at the 2021 census.

At the local council level, Southend city centre is represented by the Labour Party, particularly in Victoria and Kursaal, whilst the rest of the constituency elected Conservative and Reform UK councillors. Voters in Southend East and Rochford strongly supported leaving the European Union in the 2016 referendum; an estimated 62% voted in favour of Brexit compared to the UK-wide figure of 52%.

== History ==
This seat was created for the 1997 general election primarily from the abolished constituency of Southend East, with the addition of Rochford and Great Wakering, which were previously in the abolished Rochford constituency.

It was held by the Conservatives since its formation until 2024. The 2017 election saw a 5% swing to Labour, cutting Duddridge's majority by 3,928 votes. In the 2019 election however, a 7.4% swing from Labour to the Conservatives gave Duddridge a 12,286 majority; his largest ever majority under the seat's current boundaries.

At the 2024 election, Duddridge stood down and the constituency elected Bayo Alaba as its first Labour MP on a swing of 18.9%.

== Boundaries ==
=== Historic (Rochford and Southend East) ===
==== 1997–2010 ====
- The Borough of Southend-on-Sea wards of Milton, St Luke's, Shoebury, Southchurch, Thorpe, and Victoria; and
- The District of Rochford wards of Barling and Sutton, Foulness and Great Wakering East, Great Wakering Central, Great Wakering West, Rochford Eastwood, Rochford Roche, and Rochford St Andrews.

==== 2010–2024 ====
Map of boundaries 2010–2024

- The Borough of Southend-on-Sea wards of Kursaal, Milton, St Luke's, Shoeburyness, Southchurch, Thorpe, Victoria, and West Shoebury; and
- The District of Rochford wards of Barling and Sutton, Foulness and Great Wakering, and Rochford.

Small reduction in electorate due to redistribution of local authority wards.

=== Current (Southend East and Rochford) ===
Further to the 2023 review of Westminster constituencies, which came into effect for the 2024 general election, the composition of the constituency is as follows (as they existed on 1 December 2020):

- The District of Rochford wards of: Foulness & The Wakerings; Roche North & Rural; Roche South.
- The City of Southend-on-Sea wards of: Kursaal; Milton; Shoeburyness; Southchurch; Thorpe; Victoria; West Shoebury.

St Luke's ward was transferred to the newly named constituency of Southend West and Leigh. Minor gain of sparsely populated area to the north of the constituency from Rayleigh and Wickford.

The constituency covers the town of Rochford and the town centre, main seafront and eastern part of Southend-on-Sea, such as Thorpe Bay and Shoeburyness.

== Members of Parliament ==
Southend East and Rochford prior to 1997

Election	Member	Party
1997	Sir Teddy Taylor	Conservative
2005	Sir James Duddridge	Conservative
2024	Bayo Alaba	Labour
2026	Bayo Alaba	Independent

== Elections ==
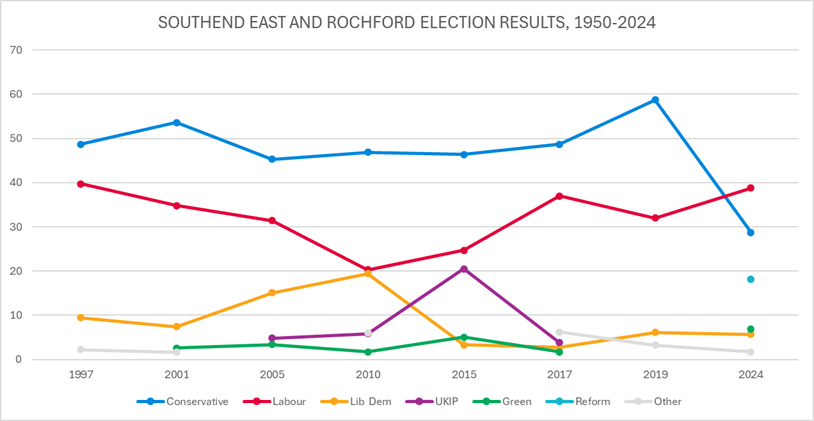
Election results 1997–2024

=== Elections in the 2020s ===
General election 2024: Southend East and Rochford
Party	Candidate	Votes	%	±%
Labour	Bayo Alaba	15,395	38.8	+7.5
Conservative	Gavin Haran	11,368	28.7	−30.3
Reform	Leslie Lilley (Note: After nominations for the 2024 general election closed, Reform UK withdrew support for Lilley on the 29 June, after reports of "offensive comments" on asylum seekers.)	7,214	18.2	N/A
Green	Simon Cross	2,716	6.8	+6.7
Liberal Democrats	James Allen	2,269	5.7	−0.7
Confelicity	Lee Clark	488	1.2	N/A
Heritage	Bianca Isherwood	206	0.5	N/A
Majority		4,027	10.1	N/A
Turnout		39,656	56.5	−5.1
Registered electors		70,217		
Labour gain from Conservative		Swing	+18.9	

=== Elections in the 2010s ===
2019 notional result
Party	Vote	%
Conservative	25,463	59.0
Labour	13,521	31.3
Liberal Democrats	2,775	6.4
Others	1,356	3.1
Green	42	0.1
Turnout	43,157	61.6
Electorate	70,094	

General election 2019: Rochford and Southend East
Party	Candidate	Votes	%	±%
Conservative	James Duddridge	27,063	58.7	+10.0
Labour	Ashley Dalton	14,777	32.0	−5.0
Liberal Democrats	Keith Miller	2,822	6.1	+3.4
Independent	Navin Kumar	1,107	2.4	N/A
Psychedelic Future	Jason Pilley	367	0.8	N/A
Majority		12,286	26.7	+15.0
Turnout		46,136	61.0	−3.3
Conservative hold		Swing	+7.4	

General election 2017: Rochford and Southend East
Party	Candidate	Votes	%	±%
Conservative	James Duddridge	23,013	48.7	+2.3
Labour	Ashley Dalton	17,465	37.0	+12.3
Independent	Ron Woodley	2,924	6.2	N/A
UKIP	Neil Hookway	1,777	3.8	−16.7
Liberal Democrats	Peter Gwizdala	1,265	2.7	−0.6
Green	Simon Cross	804	1.7	−3.3
Majority		5,548	11.7	−10.0
Turnout		47,248	64.3	+3.7
Conservative hold		Swing	−5.0	

General election 2015: Rochford and Southend East
Party	Candidate	Votes	%	±%
Conservative	James Duddridge	20,241	46.4	−0.5
Labour	Ian Gilbert	10,765	24.7	+4.4
UKIP	Floyd Waterworth	8,948	20.5	+14.7
Green	Simon Cross	2,195	5.0	+3.3
Liberal Democrats	Peter Gwizdala	1,459	3.3	−16.1
Majority		9,476	21.7	−4.9
Turnout		43,608	60.6	+2.1
Conservative hold		Swing	−2.4	

General election 2010: Rochford and Southend East
Party	Candidate	Votes	%	±%
Conservative	James Duddridge	19,509	46.9	+1.5
Labour	Kevin Bonavia	8,459	20.3	−11.3
Liberal Democrats	Graham Longley	8,084	19.4	+4.7
UKIP	James Moyies	2,405	5.8	+0.9
BNP	Geoff Strobridge	1,856	4.5	N/A
Green	Andrew Vaughan	707	1.7	−1.8
Independent	Anthony Chytry	611	1.5	N/A
Majority		11,050	26.6	+12.7
Turnout		41,631	58.5	+3.1
Conservative hold		Swing	+6.4	

=== Elections in the 2000s ===
General election 2005: Rochford and Southend East
Party	Candidate	Votes	%	±%
Conservative	James Duddridge	17,874	45.3	−8.3
Labour	Fred Grindrod	12,384	31.4	−3.4
Liberal Democrats	Graham Longley	5,967	15.1	+7.7
UKIP	John Croft	1,913	4.8	N/A
Green	Andrew Vaughan	1,328	3.4	+0.8
Majority		5,490	13.9	−4.9
Turnout		39,466	55.4	+2.7
Conservative hold		Swing	−2.4	

General election 2001: Rochford and Southend East
Party	Candidate	Votes	%	±%
Conservative	Teddy Taylor	20,058	53.6	+4.9
Labour	Chris Dandridge	13,024	34.8	−4.9
Liberal Democrats	Stephen Newton	2,780	7.4	−2.0
Green	Adrian Hedges	990	2.6	N/A
Liberal	Brian Lynch	600	1.6	−0.6
Majority		7,034	18.8	+8.8
Turnout		37,452	52.7	−11.0
Conservative hold		Swing		

=== Elections in the 1990s ===
General election 1997: Rochford and Southend East
Party	Candidate	Votes	%	±%
Conservative	Teddy Taylor	22,683	48.7	
Labour	Nigel Smith	18,458	39.7	
Liberal Democrats	Paula Smith	4,387	9.4	
Liberal	Brian Lynch	1,007	2.2	
Majority		4,225	9.0	
Turnout		46,535	63.7	
Conservative win (new seat)				

== See also ==
- List of parliamentary constituencies in Essex
- List of parliamentary constituencies in the East of England (region)
