= James Duddridge =

British Conservative politician (born 1971)

Sir James Duddridge KCMG
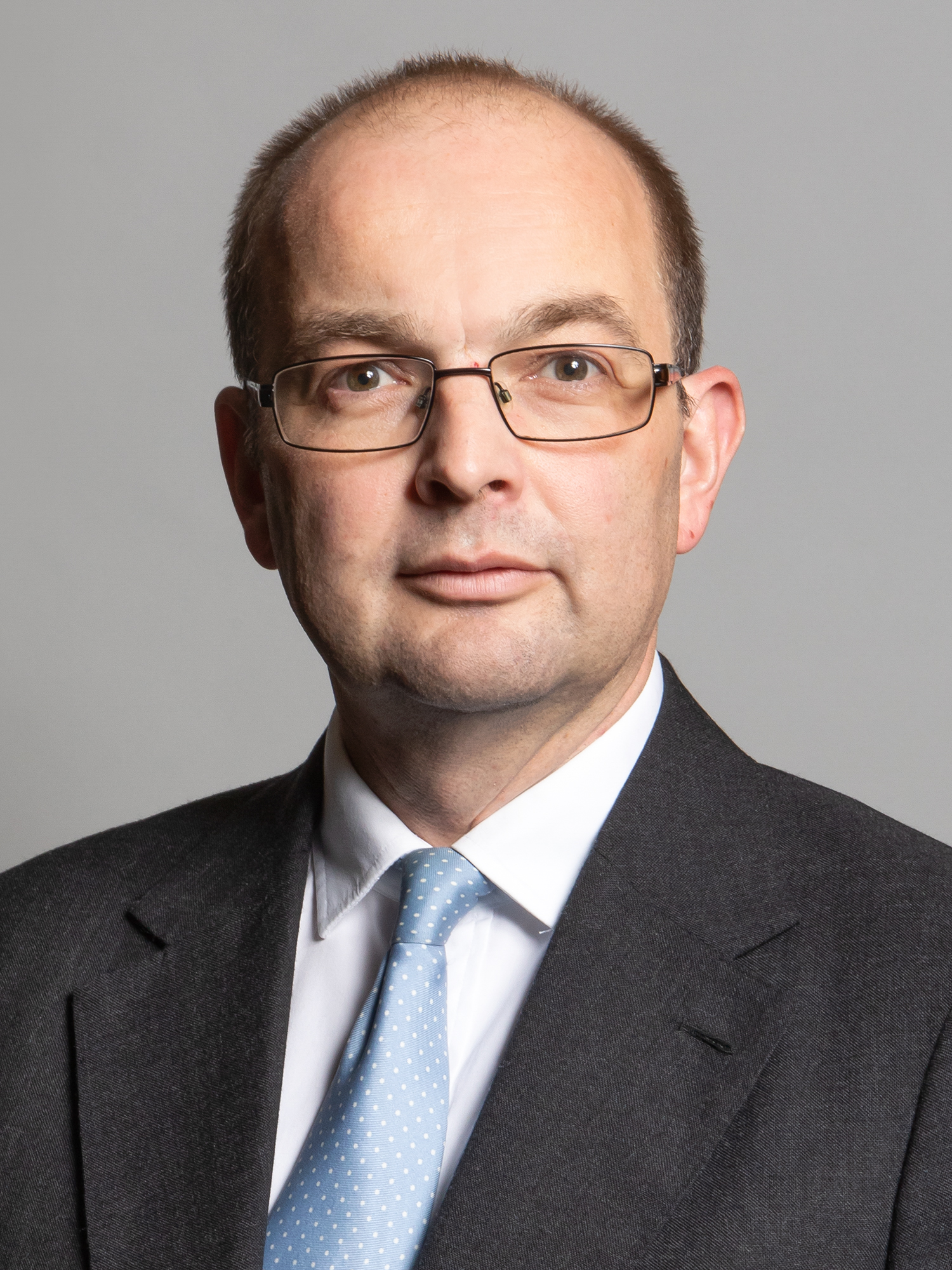
- Official portrait, 2020

Minister of State for International Trade
- In office 6 September 2022 – 26 October 2022
- Prime Minister: Liz Truss
- Preceded by: Ranil Jayawardena
- Succeeded by: Nigel Huddleston

Lord Commissioner of the Treasury
- In office 8 July 2022 – 6 September 2022
- Prime Minister: Boris Johnson
- Preceded by: Michael Tomlinson
- In office 11 May 2010 – 4 September 2012
- Prime Minister: David Cameron
- Preceded by: Tony Cunningham
- Succeeded by: Robert Goodwill

Parliamentary Private Secretary to the Prime Minister
- In office 8 February 2022 – 8 July 2022 Serving with Joy Morrissey; Lia Nici
- Prime Minister: Boris Johnson
- Preceded by: Andrew Griffith; Sarah Dines
- Succeeded by: Alexander Stafford

Parliamentary Under-Secretary of State for Africa
- In office 13 February 2020 – 16 September 2021
- Prime Minister: Boris Johnson
- Preceded by: Andrew Stephenson
- Succeeded by: Vicky Ford
- In office 11 August 2014 – 16 July 2016
- Prime Minister: David Cameron
- Preceded by: Mark Simmonds
- Succeeded by: Tobias Ellwood

Parliamentary Under-Secretary of State for Exiting the European Union
- In office 27 July 2019 – 31 January 2020
- Prime Minister: Boris Johnson
- Preceded by: Robin Walker
- Succeeded by: Office abolished

Member of Parliament for Southend East and Rochford
- In office 5 May 2005 – 30 May 2024
- Preceded by: Teddy Taylor
- Succeeded by: Bayo Alaba

Personal details
- Born: 26 August 1971 (age 55) Bristol, England
- Party: Conservative
- Spouse: Katy Thompson
- Education: University of Essex
- Profession: Banker
- Website: jamesduddridge.com

Sir James Philip Duddridge, KCMG (born 26 August 1971) is a British politician and former banker. A member of the Conservative Party, he served as the Member of Parliament (MP) for Southend East and Rochford from 2005 to 2024. Duddridge previously held several ministerial positions under prime ministers David Cameron, Boris Johnson and Liz Truss.

Duddridge first served under David Cameron as a Lord Commissioner of the Treasury from May 2010 to September 2012 and as Parliamentary Under-Secretary of State for Africa at the Foreign and Commonwealth Office from 2014 to 2016. Following Theresa May’s appointment as Prime Minister in July 2016, he returned to the backbenches.

He was appointed by May’s successor, Boris Johnson, as Parliamentary Under-Secretary of State for Exiting the European Union in July 2019, and served in the position until 31 January 2020 when the United Kingdom left the European Union and the office was abolished. Duddridge returned to his former role as Parliamentary Under-Secretary of State for Africa in February 2020 and served in this position until a government reshuffle in September 2021, when he left the government. He later served as a Parliamentary Private Secretary to Johnson from February to July 2022 and as a Lord Commissioner of the Treasury from July 2022 to September 2022.

Duddridge most recently served as Minister of State for International Trade in the Truss government. He left government for a third time in October 2022, when newly appointed prime minister Rishi Sunak dismissed him.

== Early life and career ==
James Duddridge was born on 26 August 1971 in Bristol. He was educated at Crestwood School, Huddersfield High School and The Blue School, Wells. He read Government at the University of Essex.

Duddridge served as Chairman of the Wells Young Conservatives from 1989 until 1991, and was elected Chairman of Essex University's Conservative Association in 1990. In 1991, whilst at university, local Conservative MP Bernard Jenkin appointed him as a researcher.

After graduating in 1993, Duddridge went on to pursue a career in the private sector. He was a banker with Barclays in the City of London and Africa for 10 years, rising to National Sales Director in the Ivory Coast and eventually running the bank's operations in Botswana with a staff of 750 people. He was also a founder member of the polling firm YouGov.

== Political career ==
Duddridge stood as the Conservative candidate in Rother Valley at the 2001 general election, coming second with 21.7% of the vote behind the incumbent Labour MP Kevin Barron.

He was subsequently selected as the Conservatives' parliamentary candidate for Southend East and Rochford. At the 2005 general election, Duddridge was elected as MP for Rochford and Southend East with 45.3% of the vote and a majority of 5,490. He delivered his maiden speech in the House of Commons on 9 June 2005.

From 2005 to 2007, Duddridge has served on the Environment, Food and Rural Affairs Select Committee, and the International Development Committee from 2006 to 2008, and in January 2008, he was appointed an Opposition Whip.

At the 2010 general election, Duddridge was re-elected as MP for Rochford and Southend East with an increased vote share of 46.9% and an increased majority of 11,050. After the election, he became a Lord Commissioner of the Treasury (Government Whip) with responsibility for the Foreign and Commonwealth Office and the Department for Education, but later left government in Prime Minister David Cameron's September 2012 reshuffle.

On 3 December 2010, Duddridge was permitted to reply on HM Government's behalf from the Despatch Box during an Adjournment debate, a rarity as Commons Whips – particularly Government Whips – by convention do not speak in the Chamber.

Duddridge voted in favour of the Marriage (Same Sex Couples) Bill at both its second reading in February 2013 and its third reading in May 2013.

Duddridge is seen as highly Eurosceptic, having suggested in 2013 that the Government should tell the European Commissioner to "sod off" rather than pay benefits to Romanians and Bulgarians.

On 11 August 2014, it was announced that Duddridge would return to Government as Parliamentary Under-Secretary for Foreign and Commonwealth Affairs following the resignation of Mark Simmonds over his claims that he 'could not support his family in London on an MP's salary'.

In September 2014, Duddridge claimed £11,348 for accommodation in London on expenses, mostly for hotels, despite already owning two homes in the city. He stated that his claims were in accordance with the Independent Parliamentary Standards authority. The previous year, it was reported that he had the highest expenses claim of local MPs in Essex. He was accused by Ian Kennedy of pursuing a "squalid vendetta" after he helped block the former head of the Commons expenses watchdog from an appointment to a new job of electoral commissioner in January 2018.

At the 2015 general election, Duddridge was again re-elected, with a decreased vote share of 46.4% and a decreased majority of 9,476.

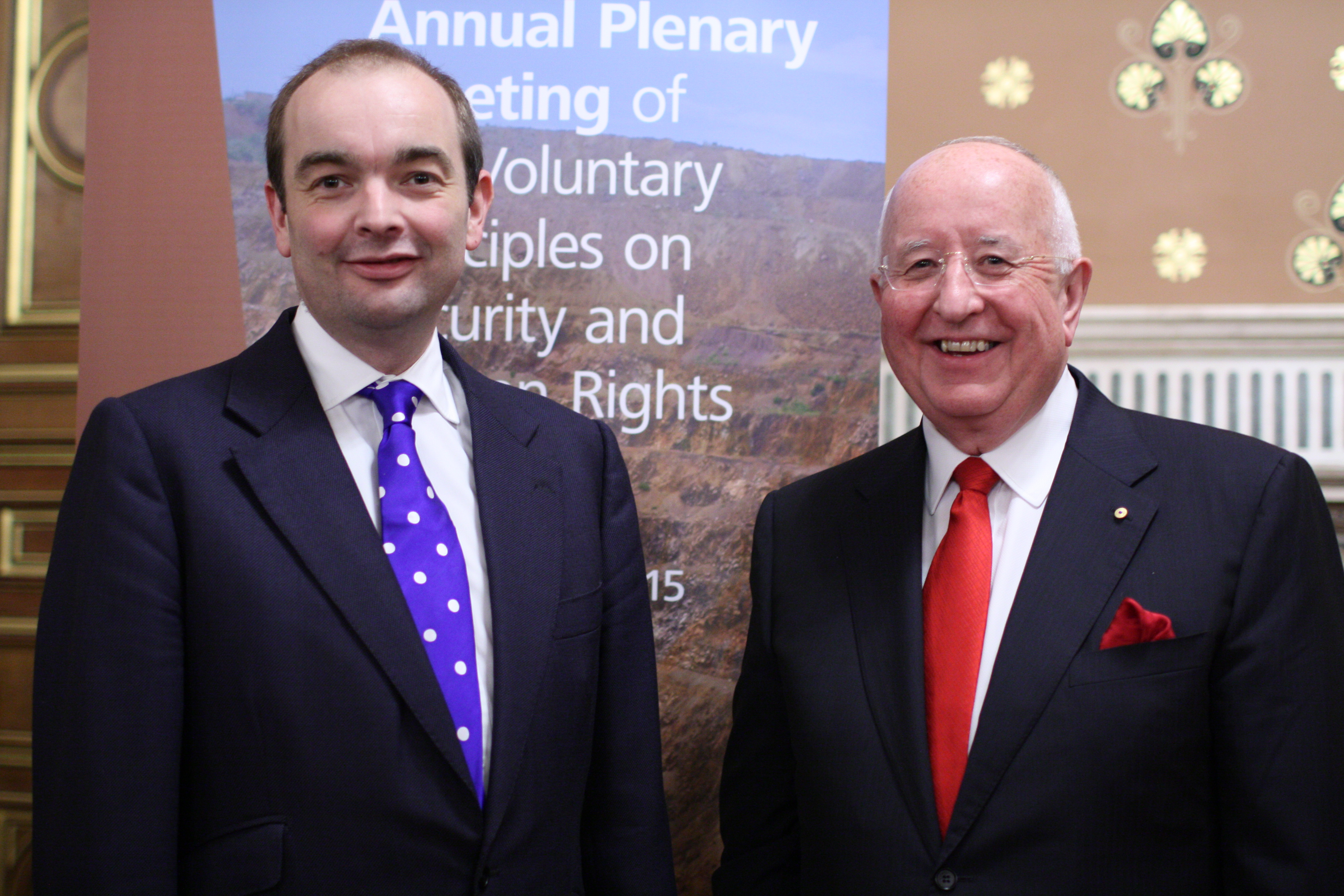
Duddridge meets with chief executive of Rio Tinto Sam Walsh at the annual plenary meeting of the Voluntary Principles on Security and Human Rights initiative on 17 March 2015 in London

On 9 February 2017, Duddridge tabled an Early Day Motion following comments made by Commons speaker John Bercow on the subject of the pending state visit of US President Donald Trump. The motion proposed "that this House has no confidence in Mr Speaker", and received criticism from across the house. The bid to remove Bercow as Commons Speaker failed after just five MPs backed Duddridge's motion of no confidence.

Duddridge was again re-elected at the snap 2017 general election, with an increased vote share of 48.7% and a decreased majority of 5,548.

On 27 September 2017, The Times reported that Duddridge, who had been Parliamentary Under-Secretary of State for Africa until 2016, was being paid £3,300 for eight hours' work a month as a consultant for Brand Communications on top of his MP's salary. The newspaper reported that this had led to renewed calls to review the rules surrounding jobs for former members of government. It was reported that he was working for Brand Communications and that the company was one of a handful that had not agreed to the industry's code of conduct that bans hiring sitting MPs. Duddridge told The Times: "The work I do involves helping companies going into the African marketplace re-brand themselves. It is not a public affairs role."

On 27 July 2019, he was appointed Parliamentary Under-Secretary of State for Exiting the European Union in Boris Johnson's administration.

At the 2019 general election, Duddridge was again re-elected, with an increased vote share of 58.7% and an increased majority of 12,286.

On 4 July 2021, he attended the funeral of Kenneth Kaunda as Parliamentary Under-Secretary of State for Africa, and incorrectly identified Kaunda as Zimbabwean rather than Zambian.

On 6 July 2022, following the mass resignation of members of the Johnson government, Duddridge was involved in an on-air argument with Piers Morgan during an appearance on an edition of talkTV's Piers Morgan Uncensored when he refused to answer questions from Morgan. Duddridge had been sent out from 10 Downing Street to speak in defence of Prime Minister Boris Johnson, but while he said he was happy to speak to the channel's political editor, Kate McCann, he refused to take questions from Morgan, claiming his wife would divorce him if he did. This resulted in the presenter labelling him an "impertinent little twerp", with Morgan later describing the moment as his "favourite TV encounter ever".

On 8 July 2022, he was appointed Lord Commissioner of the Treasury, succeeding Michael Tomlinson.

He endorsed Liz Truss in the July–September 2022 Conservative Party leadership election.

Duddridge was appointed a Knight Commander of the Order of St Michael and St George (KCMG) in the 2022 Political Honours "for political and public service."

In November 2023, he announced he would step down at the 2024 general election.

== Personal life ==
Duddrige is married with 3 children.

Parliament of the United Kingdom
Preceded by Teddy Taylor	Member of Parliament for Southend East and Rochford; 2005–2024	Succeeded by Bayo Alaba
Political offices
Preceded by Tony Cunningham	Lord Commissioner of the Treasury; 2010–2012	Succeeded by Robert Goodwill
Preceded by Mark Simmonds	Parliamentary Under-Secretary of State for Africa; 2014–2016	Succeeded by Tobias Ellwood
Preceded by Robin Walker	Parliamentary Under-Secretary of State for Exiting the European Union; 2019–2020	Department abolished
Preceded by Andrew Stephenson	Parliamentary Under-Secretary of State for Africa; 2020–2021	Succeeded by Vicky Ford
Preceded by Andrew Griffith	Parliamentary Private Secretary to the Prime Minister; 2022; With: Sarah Dines; Joy Morrissey; Lia Nici	Succeeded by Alexander Stafford
