= Tufnell =

Tufnell may refer to:

== People ==
- Carleton Tufnell (1856–1940), English cricketer
- Edward Carleton Tufnell (1806–1886), English civil servant and educationalist
- Edward Wyndham Tufnell (1814–1896), Australian bishop
- Harry Tufnell (1886–1959), English footballer
- Henry Tufnell (disambiguation), several people
- John Tufnell (1720–1794), British politician
- Meriel Patricia Tufnell (1948–2002), English jockey
- Neville Tufnell (1887–1951), English cricketer and soldier
- Olga Tufnell (1905–1985), British archaeologist
- Phil Tufnell (born 1966), English cricketer
- Richard Tufnell (1896–1956), English politician
- Thomas Jolliffe Tufnell (1819–1885), English surgeon

== Places ==
- Tufnell Park, north London, England

== See also ==
- Nigel Tufnel, fictional character in 1984 American film This Is Spinal Tap
