= Henry Tufnell (Labour politician) =

British politician (born 1992)

Henry Tufnell MP
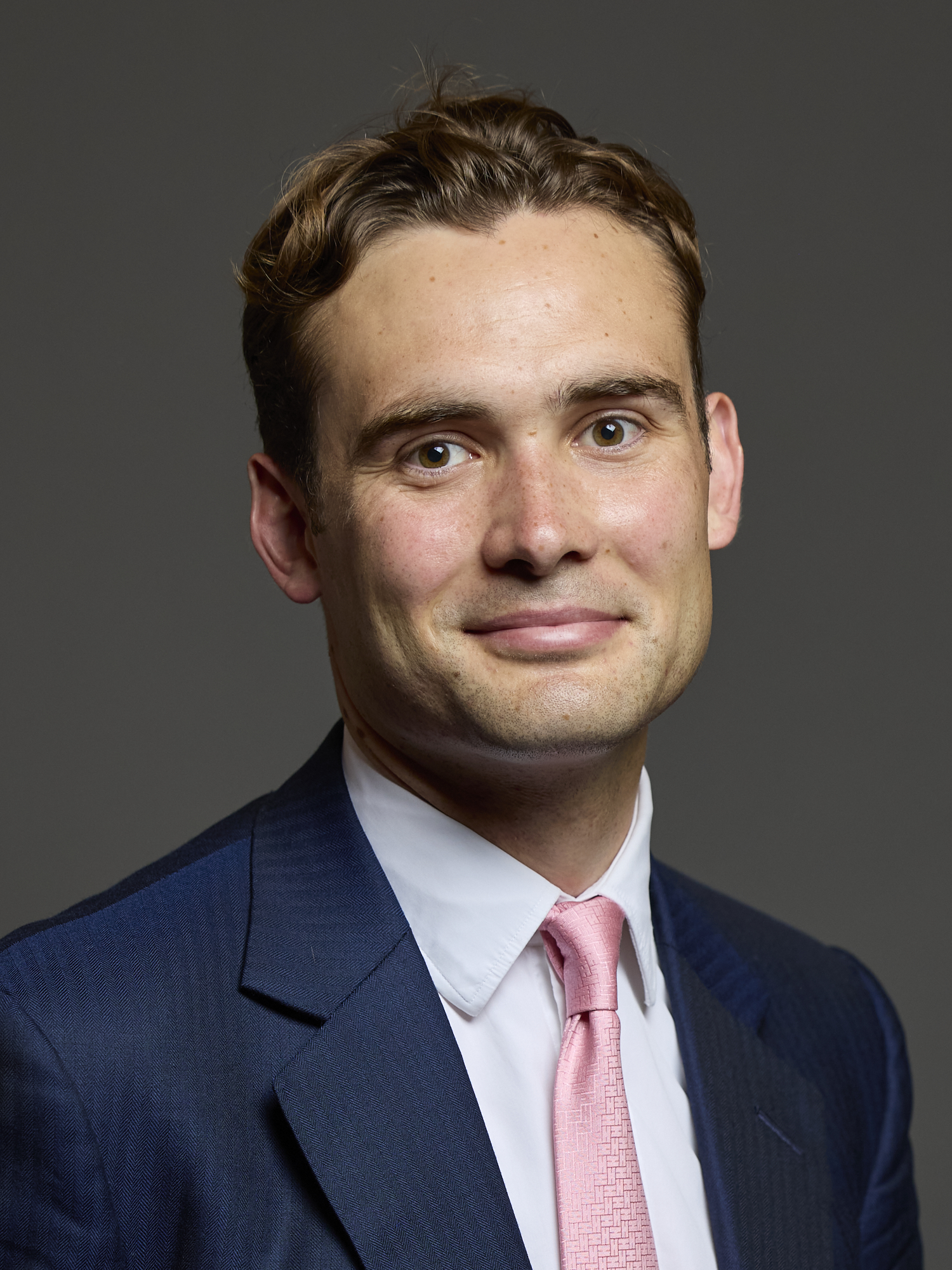
- Official portrait, 2024

Member of Parliament for Mid and South Pembrokeshire
- Incumbent
- Assumed office 4 July 2024
- Preceded by: Constituency created
- Majority: 1,878 (4%)

Personal details
- Born: 19 June 1992 (age 34)
- Party: Welsh Labour
- Spouse: Poppy Rimington-Pounder (m. 2021)
- Children: 1
- Education: Radley College; Brown University (BA); City Law School (GDL & BPTC)
- Website: www.henrytufnell.com

Henry Tufnell (born 19 June 1992) is a British Labour Party politician and lawyer who has served as the Member of Parliament (MP) for Mid and South Pembrokeshire since 2024.

== Early life and education ==
Tufnell comes from a family of Gloucestershire landowners. His father, Mark Tufnell, was the 55th president of the Country Land and Business Association and was a non-executive director of the Animal Health and Welfare Board for England; he was appointed non-executive board member at Natural England in May 2024. His paternal great-grandfather was Richard Tufnell, a Conservative MP for Cambridge. His great-great-grandfather, Edward Tufnell, was a Conservative MP for South East Essex and his great-great-great-grandfather was the civil servant and educationalist Edward Carleton Tufnell. Tufnell Park is named after his family. His mother Rosina Jane Tufnell was born in Pontypridd and was High Sheriff of Gloucestershire in 2021.

Tufnell attended Radley College, an independent boarding school for boys. He graduated from Brown University in the United States of America, majoring in History and competing in middle-distance events for the track and field team. After graduating from his undergraduate studies he attended City Law School in London earning a Graduate Diploma in Law and passing the Bar Professional Training Course. He was called to the bar by the Middle Temple and practised in England.

After graduating, Tufnell began work as a Trade Union Representative for the non-TUC affiliated Cleaners and Allied Independent Workers' Union (CAIWU), before practising as a barrister at One Crown Office Row. He later worked as an Organiser for CAIWU.

Tufnell is a trustee for the Carlie Tufnell Charitable Trust, a charity set up in memory of his younger brother. The charity funds the Carlie Tufnell Spark Fund, which provides a developmental fund for new graduates of the Central Film School, of which his brother was a student. It supports graduates in bringing their short-film projects to fruition.

== Political career ==
Tufnell unsuccessfully stood as a Labour candidate at the 2018 Westminster City Council election in the Vincent Square ward. The ward's three seats were held by the Conservative Party.

In April 2023, Tufnell was selected by local Labour Party members to contest the new constituency of Mid and South Pembrokeshire. Concerns were raised over the process by which Tufnell was selected, rather than a local candidate. He originally stood to be a Labour candidate in Colchester, Essex.

In July 2024, Tufnell was elected as the MP for Mid and South Pembrokeshire, with a majority of 1,878, defeating former Conservative Party minister Stephen Crabb.

In 2024, media reports noted that part of Tufnell's family farm was transferred to his brother shortly before inheritance tax changes affecting farmers were announced in the October 2024 budget. Tufnell denied any wrongdoing, and it was later reported that the changes were unlikely to affect his family directly.

Campaigners from the Pembrokeshire-based PARC Against DARC campaign have said Tufnell has failed to respond to a large number of emails sent to him on the local issue.

== Athletics ==
From 2010 to 2016, Tufnell competed in 800 m and 1500 m races. He placed third in the 800 m at the 2014 British Athletics Championships and 11th in the 1500 m at the 2016 Championships While attending Brown University, he was a member of the Track and Field/Cross Country team, becoming the Ivy League champion at 800 m in 2015 and earning Honorable Mention NCAA All-American in 2014.

Year	Competition	Venue	Position	Event	Notes
Representing United Kingdom
2016	British Athletics Championships	Birmingham, UK	11th	1500m	3:52.16
2014	British Athletics Championships	Birmingham, UK	3rd	800m	1:50.64

Parliament of the United Kingdom
New constituency	Member of Parliament for Mid and South Pembrokeshire; 2024–present	Incumbent
