= Dugald Macfadyen =

British clergyman and writer

Reverend Dugald Macfadyen

Personal details
- Citizenship: United Kingdom
- Party: Liberal
- Profession: Clergyman

Reverend Dugald Macfadyen MA, FRHistS, (25 December 1867 – 23 July 1936), was a British Clergyman, Liberal Party candidate and writer.

== Background ==
Macfadyen was born the son of John Allison Macfadyen and Elizabeth Anderson. He was educated at Manchester Grammar School, Merton College, Oxford and Mansfield College, Oxford. In 1894 he married Mary Olivia Goulty. They had one son and two daughters. She died in 1912. In 1915 he married Edith Barnett Bates.

== Political career ==
Macfadyen was First Secretary of the Council for Higher Education in North Staffordshire. He was a member of Hanley County Borough Education Committee. He was Chairman of the League of Nations Union, Letchworth Branch. He was Liberal candidate for the Hitchin division of Hertfordshire at the 1923 General Election. This was a safe Unionist seat that no Liberal had won since 1906. In fact no Liberal had even run since 1911. It was however his local constituency. He did manage to capture nearly a quarter of the vote and nearly out-polled the socialist who had come second in 1922. In the 1924 General Election he again fought Hitchin, but in a bad year for the Liberals, his vote dropped. He was Liberal candidate for the Reading division of Berkshire at the 1929 General Election. No Liberal candidate had stood at the previous election and the last Liberal to contest the division came a poor third in 1923. The Liberals had not won reading since 1910 so this was not fertile territory. He finished third, matching the vote share of the 1923 Liberal candidate. He did not contest the 1931 General Election. He returned to the political fray as Liberal candidate in the 1934 Cambridge by-election. No Liberal had stood in 1931 and the last Liberal candidate in 1929 polled 25%, finishing third. The Liberals had not won Cambridge since 1906, so there could not have been much optimism about his prospects. He finished a poor third, polling just 7%. He did not contest the 1935 General Election.

=== Electoral record ===
General Election 1923: Hitchin
Party	Candidate	Votes	%	±%
Unionist	Guy Molesworth Kindersley	11,157	49.7	−12.3
Labour	Benjamin Skene Mackay	5,913	26.3	−11.7
Liberal	Dugald Macfadyen	5,390	24.0	n/a
Majority		5,244	23.4	−0.6
Turnout			67.7	
Unionist hold		Swing	-0.3	

General Election 1924: Hitchin
Party	Candidate	Votes	%	±%
Unionist	Guy Molesworth Kindersley	14,019	59.2	+9.5
Labour	Julian Athelstan Tayler	5,773	24.4	−1.9
Liberal	Dugald MacFadyen	3,881	16.4	−7.6
Majority		8,246	34.8	+11.4
Turnout			69.5	+1.8
Unionist hold		Swing	+5.7	

General Election 1929: Reading
Party	Candidate	Votes	%	±%
Labour	Somerville Hastings	23,281	43.5	−2.7
Unionist	Herbert Geraint Williams	22,429	42.0	−11.8
Liberal	Dugald Macfadyen	7,733	14.5	n/a
Majority		852	1.5	−6.1
Turnout			85.0	−0.8
Labour gain from Unionist		Swing	+4.5	

1934 Cambridge by-election
Party	Candidate	Votes	%	±%
Conservative	Richard Lionel Tufnell	14,896	51.2	−22.0
Labour	Alexander Wood	12,176	41.8	+15.0
Liberal	Dugald Macfadyen	2,023	7.0	n/a
Majority		2,720	9.4	−37.0
Turnout		29,095	69.0	−6.6
Conservative hold		Swing	-18.5	

== Publications ==
- Education: Methods and Ideas
- Sir Ebenezer Howard and the Town Planning Movement, 1933
- Alfred the West Saxon King of the English, 1901
- Life and Letters of Alexander Mackennal, 1905
- Story of Andrew Swan

He was also a contributor to the Encyclopædia Britannica.
