= Edward Tufnell =

Edward Tufnell may refer to:

- Edward Tufnell (bishop), Anglican bishop of Brisbane, Queensland, Australia
- Edward Tufnell (politician), British Army officer and politician
- Edward Carleton Tufnell, English civil servant and educationist
