= Tuffnell (surname) =

Tuffnell is a surname. Notable people with the surname include:

- Frédérique Tuffnell (born 1956), French politician
- Syd Tuffnell (1904–1990), English footballer

== See also ==
- Tufnell (disambiguation)

Media related to Tuffnell (surname) at Wikimedia Commons
