= Sir Rowland Whitehead, 3rd Baronet =

Sir Rowland Edward Whitehead, 3rd Baronet KC MP (1 September 1863 – 9 October 1942) was a British barrister and Liberal Party politician.

== Early life ==
The second son of Sir James Whitehead, 1st Baronet, he was educated at Clifton College and University College, Oxford, where he took a First Class degree in history.

== Career ==
A Liberal Member of Parliament for South East Essex from 1906 to 1910, he was Parliamentary private secretary to Herbert Samuel MP from 1906 to 1909, then to the Attorney-General from 1909 to 1910.

Outside parliament, Whitehead was a Bencher of Lincoln's Inn, one of HM the King's Lieutenants for the City of London, a member of Berkshire County Council, Chairman of Council of Clifton College, a member of the Committee on Work of National Importance, 1916–1919, and held a commission in the Second Volunteer Battalion of the City of London Regiment. He was appointed a King's Counsel in 1910.

== Family ==
In 1893, Whitehead married Ethel M. L. Rathbone, a daughter of Philip H. Rathbone, and they had two sons and two daughters. Ethel was the aunt of the actor, Basil Rathbone. The family lived at White Cross House in Winterbrook near Wallingford in Berkshire (now Oxfordshire).

He inherited the baronetcy from his elder brother, Sir George Whitehead, 2nd Baronet, when his brother died on 21 May 1931. On his own death, the title went to his son Major Philip Henry Rathbone Whitehead.

Parliament of the United Kingdom
Preceded by Edward Tufnell	Member of Parliament for South East Essex; 1906 – January 1910	Succeeded by John Hendley Morrison Kirkwood
Baronetage of the United Kingdom
Preceded by George Whitehead	Baronet (of Highfield House); 1931–1942	Succeeded by Philip Whitehead
