= Felix Greene =

British journalist (1909–1985)

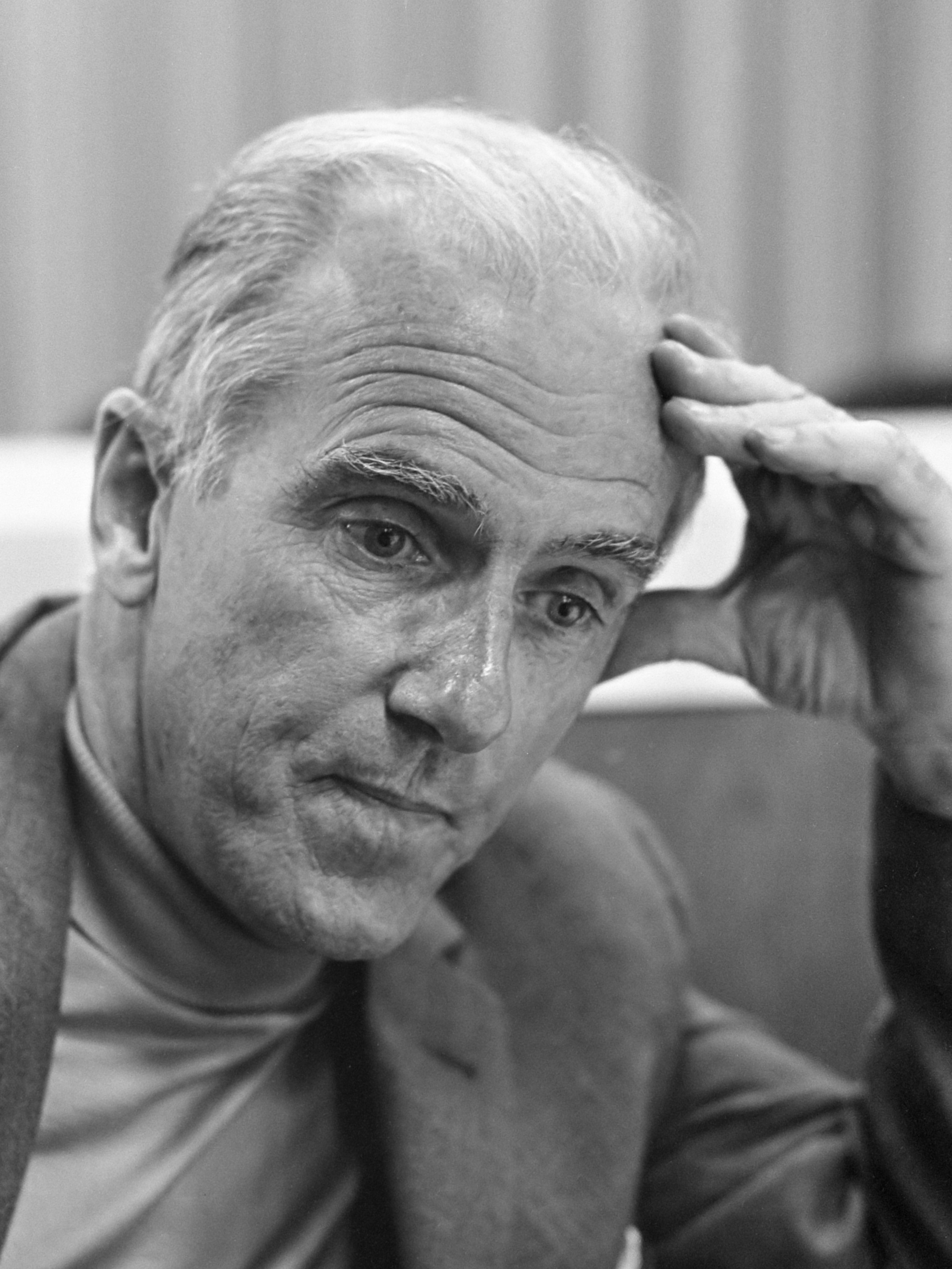
- Felix Greene in 1968
- Born: 21 May 1909; England
- Died: 15 June 1985 (aged 76); Mexico
- Education: Clare College, Cambridge
- Occupation: Journalist
- Political party: National Labour (1930s)
- Relatives: Graham Greene (cousin)

Felix Greene (21 May 1909 – 15 June 1985) was a British journalist who chronicled several communist countries in the 1960s and 1970s.

== Early life ==
Greene was educated at Sidcot School, a Quaker institution in Somerset, and at Clare College, Cambridge, where he read law. Whilst still a student, aged only 22, he stood as a National Labour candidate in South East Essex at the 1931 general election. Greene was opposed by the sitting Labour MP, John Oldfield, and by the victorious Conservative candidate, Victor Raikes, who refused to stand aside for Greene despite the fact that the Conservatives and National Labour were allies in Ramsay MacDonald's National Government. Although Greene came in third place, he nevertheless achieved a higher poll than any of the other National Labour candidates opposed by Conservatives in that election.

In 1933, Greene joined the BBC, working in the Talks Department. In 1936, he was sent to New York City, and subsequently remained in North America for the next two decades. That year, he was seconded to the Foreign Office to visit all major capitals in South America and prepare a report for the Cabinet on German and Italian propaganda exercises taking place in the region. In 1938, he was asked by the Canadian Government to assist in the preparation of a draft constitution for the Canadian Broadcasting Corporation. Resigning from the BBC in 1940, he remained in the United States, joining the Quaker American Friends Service Committee in 1941 and helping Gerald Heard establish Trabuco College in California the following year.

== Post-war career ==
Greene first visited China for the BBC in 1957, at a time when American journalists were prevented from doing so by the State Department. He was subsequently one of the first Western reporters to visit North Vietnam when he travelled there for the San Francisco Chronicle in the 1960s.

Greene produced many documentary films during this period, including One Man's China, Tibet, Cuba va!, Vietnam! Vietnam! and Inside North Viet Nam. His first documentary, China! (1963), together with the accompanying book The Wall Has Two Sides: A Portrait Of China Today, helped to embellish his reputation in the United States as a supporter of the various communist regimes and insurgencies then emerging in the Third World. Unable to get his film shown in the USA, he resorted to hiring a small New York cinema to broadcast it, a gamble which, according to The Times, paid off triumphantly when queues snaked "around the block" to see it.

When Greene's documentary films on China and Vietnam were initially released many on the liberal left appreciated them for (again in the words of The Times) "expos[ing] the falseness of Washington's presentation of its differences with 'Red China' and the pliant gullibility of the American press, which was then leaving the official accounts unchallenged." Right-wing critics, however, have accused his works of presenting a one-sided view of communist society. The Wall Street Journal argued that Greene purposely hid negative information about the extent of starvation in China and called him a "fellow traveller."

Commander R. W. Herrick of the U.S. Navy reviewed A Curtain of Ignorance in Naval War College Review, writing, "There can be no question but that [Greene] set out deliberately to 'prove' his contentions that practically everything having to do with Communist China and its policies is good, while Chiang Kai-shek and the Nationalist regimes are unmitigatedly bad. ... Yet, once the reader understands and allows for this bias, this book is eminently worth reading." Herrick agreed with Greene's observation that "... on matters where great national feelings are aroused, scholars and experts are just as likely as the rest of us to allow their judgments to be swayed by the prevailing climate of opinion." He found the chapters on Nationalist China and the China Lobby to be provocative reading.

In the 1970s, Greene went to Dharamsala to visit the 14th Dalai Lama, who recalled that after three days of discussion, Greene's attitude had changed.

Greene lived in the San Francisco area for twenty years, but returned to Britain before eventually moving to Mexico, where he died of cancer. The Times described him as a man who began his professional life as an establishment centrist but then veered leftwards, while still "remaining basically a liberal". Others, such as the journalist Brian Crozier, openly considered him an unreformed fellow traveller. He was a cousin of the author Graham Greene.

== Books ==
- Awakened China: The Country Americans Don't Know. Garden City, New York, 1961.
- The Enemy: What Every American Should Know About Imperialism. New York: Vintage Books, 1971.
- VIETNAM! VIETNAM! In Photographs and text. 1966, Palo Alto, California: Fulton Publishing Company, LCCN: 66-28359
- A Curtain of Ignorance, London: Jonathan Cape, 1965. Details of how Communist China was reported in the US in the 1960s.
- The Wall Has Two Sides. A Portrait Of China Today, The Reprint Society, 1963.

Greene's films and photos are distributed by Contemporary Films.
