= Bernard Braine =

British politician (1914–2000)

The Right Honourable The Lord Braine of Wheatley PC
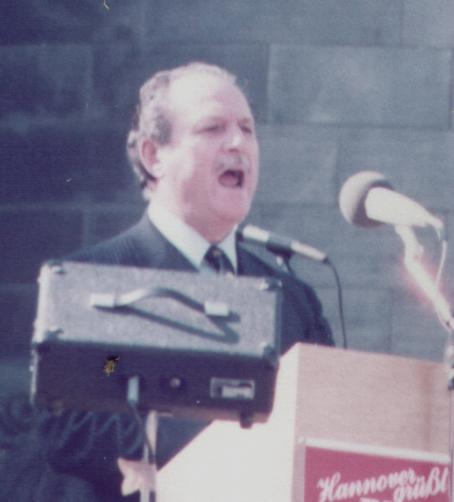
- Braine in Hanover, September 1983

Father of the House of Commons
- In office 18 May 1987 – 9 April 1992
- Speaker: Bernard Weatherill
- Preceded by: James Callaghan
- Succeeded by: Edward Heath

Shadow Minister for Overseas Development
- In office 4 October 1967 – 15 June 1970
- Leader: Edward Heath
- Preceded by: Richard Wood
- Succeeded by: Judith Hart

Member of Parliament for Castle Point South East Essex (1955–1983)
- In office 26 May 1955 – 16 March 1992
- Preceded by: Constituency established
- Succeeded by: Bob Spink

Member of Parliament for Billericay
- In office 23 February 1950 – 6 May 1955
- Preceded by: Constituency established
- Succeeded by: Richard Body

Member of the House of Lords
- Lord Temporal
- Life peerage 10 August 1992 – 5 January 2000

Personal details
- Born: 24 June 1914 Ealing, Middlesex, England
- Died: 5 January 2000 (aged 85) Southend-on-Sea, Essex, England
- Party: Conservative

Military service
- Rank: Lieutenant-Colonel
- Unit: North Staffordshire Regiment

Bernard Richard Braine, Baron Braine of Wheatley, PC (24 June 1914 – 5 January 2000) was a Conservative Party politician in the United Kingdom. He was a Member of Parliament (MP) for 42 years, from 1950 to 1992, representing constituencies in Essex.

== Early life ==
He was educated at Hendon County Grammar School, and served with the North Staffordshire Regiment in the Second World War, rising to the rank of Lieutenant-Colonel.

== Political career ==
In 1948, Braine opposed GATT, arguing that it limited imperial preference.

Having stood unsuccessfully for Leyton East in 1945, Braine was elected as MP for Billericay at the 1950 general election. When constituency boundaries were revised for the 1955 election he was returned for the new South East Essex constituency, and when that constituency was abolished for the 1983 general election, he was elected for the new Castle Point constituency, becoming Father of the House of Commons in 1987 following James Callaghan's elevation to the House of Lords.

During his long parliamentary career, Braine served as a junior Minister variously for Pensions, Commonwealth Relations and Health.

He was chairman of the National Council on Alcoholism, and author of the report Alcohol and Work (1977), widely known as the Braine Report. He was a member of the Parliamentary Groups on Human Rights and against abortion. For many years he served as an unofficial ambassador of HM's government to the Polish Government-in-Exile in London. He was knighted in the 1972 New Year Honours, and appointed as a Privy Counsellor in 1985.

Braine championed many causes involving oppressed people. Among them was the Campaign for the Defence of the Unjustly Prosecuted, of which he was President and later Chairman during 1980–1987. In this capacity and in collaboration with the exiled journalist Josef Josten, he campaigned vigorously for the release from prison of the dissident playwright Vaclav Havel, who later became President of the Czech Republic. He was decorated by Havel at a ceremony in Prague Castle on 28 October 1995.

== Later life ==
Braine stepped down from Parliament at the 1992 general election, and on 10 August that year he was made a life peer as Baron Braine of Wheatley, of Rayleigh in the County of Essex. He died in January 2000 at the age of 85.

== Arms ==
Coat of arms of Bernard Braine

Crest
Rising from a circlet of four chained portcullises Or alternating with pairs of tailor's scissors an arm embowed in armour holding a sword the blade proper hilt quillons and pommel Or striking an arc of fetters also Proper.
Escutcheon
Or a raven sable on a chief Azure between two wheatsheaves a spur Gold.
Supporters
On either side a fawn Proper that to the dexter gorged with a collar Argent fimbriated Gules and charged on each shoulder with an ostrich plume Proper spined Or (one manifest) that to the sinister gorged with a like collar Argent fimbriated Or and similarly charged with like ostrich plumes.
Motto
Repugna Contra Iniustitiam Et Mala

Parliament of the United Kingdom
New constituency	Member of Parliament for Billericay; 1950–1955	Succeeded by Richard Body
New constituency	Member of Parliament for South East Essex; 1955–1983	Constituency abolished
New constituency	Member of Parliament for Castle Point; 1983–1992	Succeeded by Bob Spink
Preceded by James Callaghan	Father of the House; 1987–1992	Succeeded by Edward Heath
