= Henry Tufnell =

Henry Tufnell may refer to:

- Henry Tufnell (Whig politician) (1805–1854), British politician
- Harry Tufnell (1886–1959), English footballer
- Henry Tufnell (Labour politician) (born 1992), British politician
