= Frank Hilder =

British politician

Frank Hilder (3 October 1864 – 23 April 1951) was the Conservative MP for the South East Essex constituency from 1918 to 1923.

Hilder was born in 1864, the son of Edward Martin Hilder of Ash, Kent. He was educated privately.

In 1895 he married Evelyn Mary Wood, the daughter of Lieutenant Colonel G W Wood, in Ingatestone, Essex. The couple lived at Huskards also in Ingatestone.

He was an officer in the Essex Yeomanry, in which regiment he was promoted to captain on 20 December 1902.

In 1906 Hilder was made a Justice of the Peace for the county of Essex.

At the beginning of the First World War the Hilders turned Huskards into a Voluntary Auxiliary hospital, with Mrs Hilder acting as matron. It remained a VA hospital until it was closed in 1919.

He stood as the Unionist candidate for the South-East Essex constituency in the 1918 General Election, the first general election following the end of the First World War. He defeated the Labour candidate Joe Cotter and the Liberal candidate Sydney Walter Robinson. He stood again in the following general election held in 1922. He defended his seat against the Labour candidate Philip Hoffman, winning by 13,522 votes to 11,459. However, the following year there was another General Election and this time the Labour candidate Philip Hoffman defeated Hilder by 13,979 votes to 12,379.

In 1935 Hilder was appointed the High Sheriff of Essex.

He died at his home in Ingatestone on 23 April 1951 aged 86. There's a Plaque with his name on in Walton on the Naze on the YMCA building

Parliament of the United Kingdom
Preceded by Rupert Guinness	Member of Parliament for South East Essex; 1918–1923	Succeeded by Philip Hoffman
