= John Hendley Morrison Kirkwood =

- John Kirkwood in 1910

Member of Parliament for South East Essex
- In office January 1910 – Early 1912

Personal details
- Born: 1877
- Died: 1924 (aged 46–47)
- Party: Conservative
- Spouse: Gertrude Lyle
- Children: Sir Robert Lucian Morrison Kirkwood, KCMG
- Parent(s): Major James Morrison Kirkwood and Isabel Brockman
- Occupation: Landowner, Army officer, Politician
- Awards: Distinguished Service Order (DSO)

Military service
- Branch/service: British Army
- Rank: Lieutenant-Colonel
- Unit: 7th Dragoon Guards, Royal North Devon Hussars
- Battles/wars: Second Boer War, World War I

Lieutenant-Colonel John Hendley Morrison Kirkwood, DSO (1877–1924), was a British landowner and Conservative politician.

== Career ==
Kirkwood was the eldest son and heir of Major James Morrison Kirkwood (1839–1907), of Yeo Vale, by his wife Isabel Brockman (died 1926). He inherited the Yeo Vale estate on his father's death in 1907, and also owned land in Ireland, including in County Mayo and County Sligo where (by March 1916) he sold 4,000 acres to the Congested Districts' Board.

He was commissioned a second-lieutenant in the 7th Dragoon Guards on 30 May 1900, was promoted to lieutenant and served in the Second Boer War before he resigned from the regular army. In October 1902 he was appointed a lieutenant in the Royal North Devon Hussars, a yeomanry regiment from his home county. He later re-enlisted for active service in World War I, and became a lieutenant-colonel.

He served as a Justice of the Peace for Devon

Kirkwood was elected a Member of Parliament for South East Essex in January 1910, was re-elected in December 1910, but resigned only two years later, in early 1912.

== Family ==
Kirkwood married in 1902 Gertrude Lyle, eldest daughter of Sir Robert Park Lyle, 1st Baronet (1859–1923), of Greenock. They had several children, including Sir Robert Lucian Morrison Kirkwood, KCMG (1904–1984).

Parliament of the United Kingdom
Preceded by Rowland Whitehead	Member of Parliament for South East Essex; 1910 – 1912	Succeeded by Rupert Guinness
