= Castle Point (constituency) =

UK Parliament constituency (since 1983)

Coordinates: 51.54°N 0.57°E

- Borough constituency for the House of Commons
- Interactive map of boundaries since 2024
- Location within the East of England
- County: Essex
- Population: 88,011 (2011 census)
- Electorate: 70,923 (March 2020)
- Major settlements: Canvey Island, South Benfleet, Hadleigh

Current constituency
- Created: 1983
- Member of Parliament: Dame Rebecca Harris (Conservative)
- Seats: One
- Created from: South East Essex

Castle Point is a constituency (Note: A borough constituency (for the purposes of election expenses and type of returning officer).) in Essex represented in the House of Commons of the UK Parliament since 2010 by Dame Rebecca Harris, a Conservative. (Note: As with all constituencies, the constituency elects one Member of Parliament (MP) by the first past the post system of election at least every five years.)

== Constituency profile ==
The seat is located in Essex and is mostly coterminous with the Castle Point local authority area, which takes its name from Hadleigh Castle and Canvey Point. The constituency's largest town is Canvey Island with a population of around 38,000. It also includes the towns of South Benfleet, Thundersley and Hadleigh. Canvey Island was a popular seaside resort but, like many coastal towns in England, has experienced economic decline in recent decades. The town is an important centre for the petrochemical industry. Canvey Island has high levels of deprivation whilst the mainland areas are generally affluent.

Compared to national averages, residents of Castle Point are older, have similar levels of income and professional employment and high levels of homeownership. The constituency has one of the lowest proportions of university graduates of any constituency in the country. White people make up 95% of the population. At the local council level, there is wide support for independent politicians; the Castle Point Borough Council is entirely made up of councillors from two independent groupings (PIP and CIIP). Voters in the constituency overwhelmingly supported leaving the European Union in the 2016 referendum. An estimated 73% voted in favour of Brexit, making Castle Point one of the top five most Brexit-supporting constituencies out of 650 nationwide.

== History ==
This seat was created for the 1983 general election from the former seat of South East Essex. It comprised the district of Castle Point which was formed from the former Urban Districts of Canvey Island and Benfleet and includes Canvey Island, Hadleigh, South Benfleet, and Thundersley.

In all but one election, it has been won by a Conservative candidate, passing to Labour once, in the 1997 election. The former MP defeated in 1997, Bob Spink, regained the seat in 2001. He was re-elected in 2005 but subsequently resigned from the Conservative Party on 22 April 2008. Spink briefly joined UKIP, but resigned the whip shortly afterwards and sat as an independent MP. In the 2010 election, Spink lost in Castle Point to the Conservative candidate, Rebecca Harris.

At the 2017 election Castle Point had the largest Conservative majority, at 42.2%, of any constituency to have elected a Labour MP in the 1997–2010 government. This was increased even further, to 60.1%, at the 2019 election. In 2024, the Conservative vote was more than halved with Reform UK taking over 30%, reducing the majority to just 8%.

== Boundaries ==
=== 1983–2024 ===
Since its creation in 1983 until the 2024 general election, the Castle Point constituency was contiguous with the boundaries of the district council of the same name. The seat is one of only a very few that were unchanged by the boundary reviews which came into effect in 1997 and 2010, having seen population growth in line with the average seat (which is slightly larger), including development in the designated development plans of the Thames Gateway.

=== Current ===
Further to the 2023 review of Westminster constituencies, which came into effect for the 2024 general election, the composition of the constituency was expanded slightly to meet the electorate size requirements, with the transfer in from South Basildon and East Thurrock of polling district DN of the Pitsea South East ward in the Borough of Basildon - equivalent to the civil parish of Bowers Gifford and North Benfleet.

== Members of Parliament ==
| Election | Member | Party |
|---|---|---|
| 1983 | Sir Bernard Braine | Conservative |
| 1992 | Bob Spink | Conservative |
| 1997 | Christine Butler | Labour |
| 2001 | Bob Spink | Conservative |
| Apr 2008 | Bob Spink | UKIP |
| Nov 2008 | Bob Spink | Independent |
| 2010 | Rebecca Harris | Conservative |

== Elections ==
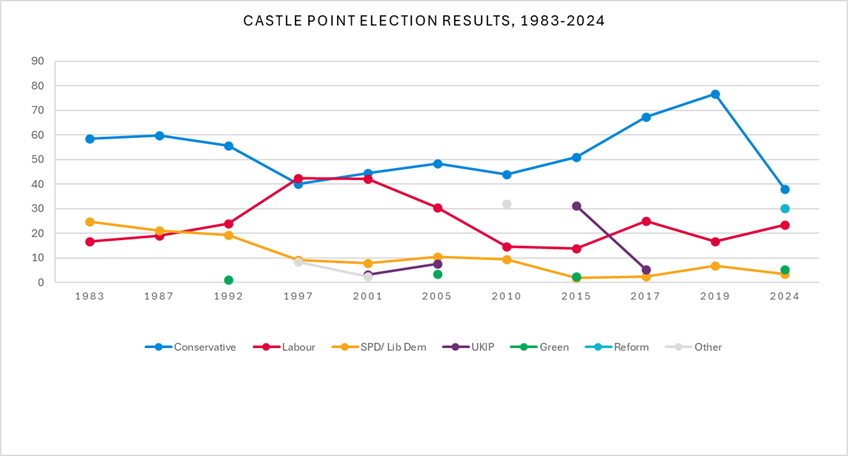
Castle Point election results 1983–2024

=== Elections in the 2020s ===
General election 2024: Castle Point
| Party | Candidate | Votes | % | ±% |
|---|---|---|---|---|
| Conservative | Rebecca Harris | 15,485 | 38.1 | −38.4 |
| Reform | Keiron McGill | 12,234 | 30.1 | N/A |
| Labour | Mark Maguire | 9,455 | 23.3 | +6.5 |
| Green | Bob Chapman | 2,118 | 5.2 | N/A |
| Liberal Democrats | James Willis | 1,341 | 3.3 | −3.3 |
| Majority | | 3,251 | 8.0 | −52.1 |
| Turnout | | 40,633 | 57.6 | −6.2 |
| Registered electors | | 70,552 | | |
| Conservative hold | | Swing | | |

=== Elections in the 2010s ===
2019 notional result
| Party | Vote | % |
|---|---|---|
| Conservative | 34,611 | 76.5 |
| Labour | 7,602 | 16.8 |
| Liberal Democrats | 3,004 | 6.6 |
| Turnout | 45,217 | 63.8 |
| Electorate | 70,923 | |

General election 2019: Castle Point
| Party | Candidate | Votes | % | ±% |
|---|---|---|---|---|
| Conservative | Rebecca Harris | 33,971 | 76.7 | +9.4 |
| Labour | Katie Curtis | 7,337 | 16.6 | −8.5 |
| Liberal Democrats | John Howson | 2,969 | 6.7 | +4.4 |
| Majority | | 26,634 | 60.1 | +17.9 |
| Turnout | | 44,277 | 63.6 | −0.8 |
| Conservative hold | | Swing | +9.0 | |

This was the largest Conservative vote share at the 2019 general election.

General election 2017: Castle Point
| Party | Candidate | Votes | % | ±% |
|---|---|---|---|---|
| Conservative | Rebecca Harris | 30,076 | 67.3 | +16.4 |
| Labour | Joe Cooke | 11,204 | 25.1 | +11.3 |
| UKIP | David Kurten | 2,381 | 5.3 | −25.9 |
| Liberal Democrats | Tom Holder | 1,049 | 2.3 | +0.5 |
| Majority | | 18,872 | 42.2 | +22.5 |
| Turnout | | 44,710 | 64.4 | −2.3 |
| Conservative hold | | Swing | +2.6 | |

General election 2015: Castle Point
| Party | Candidate | Votes | % | ±% |
|---|---|---|---|---|
| Conservative | Rebecca Harris | 23,112 | 50.9 | +6.9 |
| UKIP | Jamie Huntman | 14,178 | 31.2 | New |
| Labour | Joe Cooke | 6,283 | 13.8 | −0.9 |
| Green | Dom Ellis | 1,076 | 2.4 | New |
| Liberal Democrats | Sereena Davey | 801 | 1.8 | −7.6 |
| Majority | | 8,934 | 19.7 | +2.7 |
| Turnout | | 45,450 | 66.7 | −0.2 |
| Conservative hold | | Swing | −24.3 | |

General election 2010: Castle Point
| Party | Candidate | Votes | % | ±% |
|---|---|---|---|---|
| Conservative | Rebecca Harris | 19,806 | 44.0 | −4.3 |
| Independent Save Our Green Belt | Bob Spink | 12,174 | 27.0 | New |
| Labour | Julian Ware-Lane | 6,609 | 14.7 | −15.7 |
| Liberal Democrats | Brendan D'Cruz | 4,232 | 9.4 | −0.9 |
| BNP | Philip Howell | 2,205 | 4.9 | New |
| Majority | | 7,632 | 17.0 | −0.9 |
| Turnout | | 45,026 | 66.9 | +1.0 |
| Conservative hold | | Swing | −15.7 | |

=== Elections in the 2000s ===
General election 2005: Castle Point
| Party | Candidate | Votes | % | ±% |
|---|---|---|---|---|
| Conservative | Bob Spink | 22,118 | 48.3 | +3.7 |
| Labour | Luke Akehurst | 13,917 | 30.4 | −11.7 |
| Liberal Democrats | James Sandbach | 4,719 | 10.3 | +2.5 |
| UKIP | Neil Hamper | 3,431 | 7.5 | +4.3 |
| Green | Irene Willis | 1,617 | 3.5 | New |
| Majority | | 8,201 | 17.9 | +15.4 |
| Turnout | | 45,802 | 65.9 | +7.5 |
| Conservative hold | | Swing | +7.7 | |

General election 2001: Castle Point
| Party | Candidate | Votes | % | ±% |
|---|---|---|---|---|
| Conservative | Bob Spink | 17,738 | 44.6 | +4.5 |
| Labour | Christine Butler | 16,753 | 42.1 | −0.3 |
| Liberal Democrats | Billy Boulton | 3,116 | 7.8 | −1.4 |
| UKIP | Ronald Hurrell | 1,273 | 3.2 | New |
| Independent | Douglas Roberts | 663 | 1.7 | New |
| Truth Party | Nik Searle | 223 | 0.6 | New |
| Majority | | 985 | 2.5 | N/A |
| Turnout | | 39,766 | 58.4 | −13.7 |
| Conservative gain from Labour | | Swing | +2.4 | |

=== Elections in the 1990s ===
General election 1997: Castle Point
| Party | Candidate | Votes | % | ±% |
|---|---|---|---|---|
| Labour | Christine Butler | 20,605 | 42.4 | +18.4 |
| Conservative | Bob Spink | 19,462 | 40.1 | −15.5 |
| Liberal Democrats | Michael Baker | 4,477 | 9.2 | −10.0 |
| Referendum | Hugh Maulkin | 2,700 | 5.6 | New |
| Independent | Linda Kendall | 1,301 | 2.7 | New |
| Majority | | 1,143 | 2.3 | N/A |
| Turnout | | 48,545 | 72.1 | −8.3 |
| Labour gain from Conservative | | Swing | +17.0 | |

General election 1992: Castle Point
| Party | Candidate | Votes | % | ±% |
|---|---|---|---|---|
| Conservative | Bob Spink | 29,629 | 55.6 | −4.3 |
| Labour | David Flack | 12,799 | 24.0 | +5.0 |
| Liberal Democrats | Allan Petchey | 10,208 | 19.2 | −1.9 |
| Green | Irene Willis | 643 | 1.2 | New |
| Majority | | 16,830 | 31.6 | −7.2 |
| Turnout | | 53,279 | 80.4 | +5.9 |
| Conservative hold | | Swing | −4.7 | |

=== Elections in the 1980s ===
General election 1987: Castle Point
| Party | Candidate | Votes | % | ±% |
|---|---|---|---|---|
| Conservative | Bernard Braine | 29,681 | 59.9 | +1.4 |
| SDP | Anne Bastow | 10,433 | 21.1 | −3.7 |
| Labour | William Deal | 9,422 | 19.0 | +2.3 |
| Majority | | 19,248 | 38.8 | +5.1 |
| Turnout | | 49,536 | 74.5 | +3.2 |
| Conservative hold | | Swing | +2.6 | |

General election 1983: Castle Point
| Party | Candidate | Votes | % | ±% |
|---|---|---|---|---|
| Conservative | Bernard Braine | 26,730 | 58.5 | |
| SDP | Anne Bastow | 11,313 | 24.8 | |
| Labour | Lynne Cunningham | 7,621 | 16.7 | |
| Majority | | 15,417 | 33.7 | |
| Turnout | | 45,664 | 71.3 | |
| Conservative win (new seat) | | | | |

== See also ==
- parliamentary constituencies in Essex

== Notes ==
Parliament of the United Kingdom
| Preceded by Cardiff South and Penarth | Constituency represented by the father of the House; 1987–1992 | Succeeded by Old Bexley and Sidcup |
