= Arthur Symonds =

British politician (1910–1960)

Arthur Symonds OBE
- Born: Arthur Leslie Symonds; 2 October 1910
- Died: 25 February 1960 (aged 49)
- Education: Perse School, Jesus College, Cambridge
- Occupation: politician
- Years active: 1945–1950
- Known for: Member of Parliament for Cambridge
- Political party: Labour Party

Arthur Leslie Symonds, OBE (2 October 1910 – 25 February 1960) was a Labour Party politician in the United Kingdom.

He grew up in Cambridge and was educated at the Perse School and Jesus College, Cambridge, before moving to Cornwall, where he was an Assistant Master at St. Austell County School for Boys between 1933 and 1940. He then served in the armed forces between 1940 and 1945, being mentioned twice in despatches, and earning an MBE.

He was elected as member of parliament for Cambridge in the Labour landslide at the 1945 general election, winning by a majority of only 682 votes over the incumbent Conservative MP Richard Tufnell. At the 1950 general election, he lost by 5,355 votes to the Conservative Hamilton Kerr. He made two more attempts at regaining the seat, in the general elections of 1951 and 1955, but did not contest it in 1959.

He was made a justice of the peace in Cambridge in 1957, and was awarded the OBE in 1959. He died in 1960, at the age of 49.

Parliament of the United Kingdom
Preceded by Richard Tufnell	Member of Parliament for Cambridge; 1945–1950	Succeeded by Hamilton Kerr
