= Herbert Looker =

Herbert William Looker (2 December 1871 – 13 December 1951) was the Conservative MP for the South East Essex constituency from 1924 to 1929.

Looker was born 2 December 1871 in St Ives, Huntingdonshire. He was educated privately before joining a London firm of solicitors; he was managing clerk from 1894 to 1895. In 1895 he moved to Hong Kong to join a firm of solicitors there, becoming a partner in Deacon, Looker and Deacon. Following his retirement in 1919 he returned to England to live in Great Baddow, near Chelmsford and began a political career.

On 6 October 1921 he was selected to fight the Hull Central constituency by the Central Hull Conservative Council. The following year he was defeated by the incumbent Labour MP Joseph Kenworthy by 15,374 votes to 12,347 in the 1922 General Election.

Two years later, on 12 March 1924 Looker was unanimously selected to be the Conservative Candidate for South East Essex. The general election was held later that year and this time Looker defeated the incumbent Labour MP Philip Hoffman by 19,731 votes to 13,820. While an MP he was a regular contributor to parliamentary debates.

On 8 May 1929 Looker was again unanimously selected to be the Conservative candidate to fight the next election. This time though it was to be a three-horse race with the addition of a Liberal candidate which the Conservatives knew made the chance of regaining the seat more difficult. Their fears were realised when the Labour candidate, Jack Oldfield, won the constituency with a majority of just 626, receiving 18,756 votes. Looker received 18,130 votes, and the Liberal candidate, George Thomas Veness, 13,030 votes.

Some time after his election defeat he moved to Forest Row, Sussex. Here, in April 1933, he was elected to the Withyham Division of East Sussex County Council. He remained there until his death on 13 December 1951.

Parliament of the United Kingdom
Preceded by Philip Hoffman	Member of Parliament for South East Essex; 1924–1929	Succeeded by Jack Oldfield
