= 1934 Cambridge by-election =

UK Parliamentary by-election

The 1934 Cambridge by-election was held on 8 February 1934. The by-election was held due to the elevation to the peerage of the incumbent Conservative MP, George Newton. It was won by the Conservative candidate Richard Tufnell.

Cambridge by-election, 1934
Party	Candidate	Votes	%	±%
Conservative	Richard Tufnell	14,896	51.2	−22.0
Labour	Alexander Wood	12,176	41.8	+15.0
Liberal	Dugald Macfadyen	2,023	7.0	New
Majority		2,720	9.4	−37.0
Turnout		29,095	69.0	−6.6
Conservative hold		Swing	-18.5	
