= Philip Hoffman (British politician) =

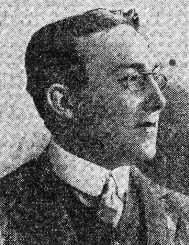
Hoffman in 1908

Philip Christopher Hoffman (26 June 1878 – 20 April 1959) was a British trade unionist and Labour Party politician.

Born in London, Hoffman studied at the Coopers' Company and Coborn School in Stepney (now in Upminster), then the Warehousemen, Clerks and Drapers School at Purley. He became a draper and an active trade unionist, and was soon working for the Shop Assistants Union. In 1908, he was the union's South Wales Organiser.

Hoffman stood as the Labour Party candidate for South East Essex in 1922, and was elected at the 1923 general election. He lost the seat in 1924, and in 1929 was instead elected for Sheffield Central. He lost this seat in 1931 and narrowly failed to regain it in 1935.

After the Second World War, he authored 'They Also Serve,' a history of the Shop Assistants Union.

Parliament of the United Kingdom
Preceded by Frank Hilder	Member of Parliament for South East Essex; 1923–1924	Succeeded by Herbert Looker
Preceded by James Hope	Member of Parliament for Sheffield Central; 1929–1931	Succeeded by William Boulton
