= Hope Bagenal =

British architectural theorist and acoustician

Philip Hope Edward Bagenal, OBE (11 February 1888 – 20 May 1979) was a British architectural theorist and acoustician who introduced a scientific approach to the acoustic design of buildings.

== Education and early career ==
Bagenal, known by his second name, Hope, was born in Dublin, but the family moved to England when he was two years old. He attended various schools as his father moved first to the North (including St Peter's School, York) and then to East Anglia, finishing at Uppingham School. From 1905 to 1909 he studied engineering at Leeds University, but left without qualifying. He then joined an architectural practice in London and studied at the Architectural Association. In 1911 Bagenal joined Edwin Cooper and worked on the Port of London Authority building.

By March 1914, Bagenal was in contact with Wallace Sabine, who was studying the link between reverberation and absorption in auditorium design. Bagenal, with his engineering background, recognised the significance of this work to the architectural profession, and developed a career in acoustics consultancy.

Bagenal, at that time attracted by the Quakers, volunteered for the Royal Army Medical Corps and was sent to Flanders, from where he wrote a series of articles, and poems. At the end of the Great War, the best were reprinted in Fields and Battlefields under the pseudonym No. 31540. He published further anthologies in 1932 and 1940. He was wounded at the Somme, where he was awarded the DCM, and convalesced at the army's 1st Eastern General Hospital, Cambridge. Here he met the physicist Alex Wood, with whom he later wrote the pioneering text, Planning for Good Acoustics (1931).

== Acoustic consultancy ==
He resumed his architectural career in 1917 and moved into Leaside, a cottage in the Lea Valley, with his extended family in a house partly dating back to early 1800s, surrounded by ancient woodland. The house in due course became a refuge and meeting place for numerous visitors, from explorers (Sandy Wollaston) to musicians (Toni and Rosi Grunschlag), from psychiatrists (John Layard and Donald Winnicott) to artists (Elinor Darwin and Margaret Calkin James), all held captive by the genius loci of the valley and the warmth and hospitality of the family who lived there.

He returned to the Architectural Association as librarian and editor of the AA Journal, and developed his acoustics consultancy. He was as adviser to Charles Cowles-Voysey for the White Rock Pavilion, Hastings and subsequently worked on most of the major concert hall, theatre, and civic halls in the United Kingdom. His international work included the New Delhi Legislative Chamber, the Sydney Opera House and the New York Lincoln Center.

He toured widely, drawing and photographing classical buildings, and studied in Italy and Greece in 1925 and 1926. With Robert Atkinson he wrote the Theory and Elements of Architecture (1926), on the foundations of classicism.

During World War II, Bagenal worked at the Building Research Station as a scientific officer. In the post-war years his work afforded him further opportunities to travel.

Bagenal played a pivotal role in establishing the acoustic research agenda in Britain, introducing advances in the science to the British construction industry. Throughout his career, Bagenal was preoccupied with the acquisition of measured acoustic data from myriad sites, ranging from cathedrals to concert halls, inserting this corpus of information into his ongoing refinement of predictive models that were to established as principles for design and construction.

Among his most important acoustics projects were the refurbishment of the Royal Albert Hall and the construction of the Royal Festival Hall, the Free Trade Hall, Manchester, and the Fairfield Halls, Croydon. As consultant to the Building Research Station during the 1960s Bagenal investigated the weathering of buildings in London. His prolific writings expanded into new areas, including topography, history, and theology.

== Reputation ==
Bagenal was elected a Fellow of the Royal Institute of British Architects, and his work was recognised by the state in 1956 when he was invested as an Officer of the Order of the British Empire. In 1975, Bagenal was awarded an honorary fellowship of the Institute of Acoustics.

In the 1940s, the Building Research Station constructed three blocks of flats at Abbots Langley to test new building methods, including acoustic insulation. They were named Bagenal House, Rayleigh House, and Sabine House. In a play of letters, the nomenclature not only made reference to the initials of the BRS, it also paid homage to three significant contributors to the development of architectural acoustics.

As the Dictionary of National Biography records, Hope Bagenal could be intimidating and remote: physically tall and gaunt, difficult to know, intolerant of fools, yet generous with those with whom he found an intellectual rapport. The two major technical books to which he contributed remain classics in their genres.

== Publications ==
Bagenal wrote standard text books on architecture and acoustics, but also on more general issues, as can be seen in the bibliography below. He wrote extensively on classical architecture, combining direct observation of Greek and Roman sites with speculation about the origin of classical forms, the relationship between architecture, geology, climate and landscape, and the symbolic content of architectural form.

In the 1970s, Bagenal wrote a series of letters to his niece. In these he retraced his life until 1918 and his Anglo-Irish heritage. They cover his childhood, his days serving as a sergeant in the RAMC, the interesting people he met in Cambridge with his wife, Alison, during his convalescence there in 1916, his interest in acoustics and his early days as an architect.

Bagenal, Hope (1914). Clifford Manor in the County of Gloucester. Compiled from materials collected by Kathleen M.C.H. Douty. London: Arthur L. Humphreys.

—— (1918). Fields and Battlefields by No. 31540. London: Constable & Co.

—— & Atkinson, Philip (1926). Theory and elements of architecture. Vol. 1, Pt. 1. London: E. Benn Ltd.

—— & Wood, Alexander (1931). Planning for Good Acoustics, etc. London: Methuen & Co.

—— (1932). "Sculpture Galleries. The Royal Institute of British Architects Prize essay, 1931". Journal of the Royal Institute of British Architects. London.

—— & Barnett, Percy William (1933). The Reduction of Noise in Buildings. Recommendations to architects. London: Building Research Board.

—— (1934). "Agricultural buildings and the origins of the orders". Journal of the Royal Institute of British Architects. London.

—— (1938). "Some Yorkshire studies". Journal of the Royal Institute of British Architects. London.

—— & Williams, Isaac (1940). Sonnets in War and Peace, and other verses. London: Oxford University Press.

—— (1942). Practical Acoustics and Planning Against Noise. London: Methuen and Co..

—— (1943). "On the mysticism of Wordsworth and Blake". Durham University Journal. New Series. IV.

—— (1951). "Musical taste and concert hall design'". Proceedings of the Royal Musical Association. 78 (78): 11–29. doi:10.1093/jrma/78.1.11.

——; Hamilton, Stanley Baines & White, R. B. (1964). A Qualitative Study of Some Buildings in the London Area. National Building Studies. Vol. Special Report 33. London: HMSO.

—— (1979). Foreword. Acoustics, noise and buildings. By Parkin, Peter Hubert & Humphreys, Henry Robert. London: Faber & Faber. ISBN 978-0-571-04952-3.
