= 1912 South East Essex by-election =

UK Parliamentary by-election

The 1912 South East Essex by-election was held on 16 March 1912. The by-election was held due to the resignation of the incumbent Conservative MP, John Hendley Morrison Kirkwood. It was won by the Conservative candidate Rupert Guinness, who was unopposed. Guinness had previously been MP for Haggerston.
