= Christine Butler =

British politician

Member of Parliament for Castle Point
- In office 1 May 1997 – 14 May 2001
- Preceded by: Bob Spink
- Succeeded by: Bob Spink

Member of Essex County Council for Great Tarpots
- In office 6 May 1993 – 1 May 1997
- Preceded by: William Brum
- Succeeded by: Alfred Goldsworth

Personal details
- Born: 14 December 1943 Nelson, Lancashire, England
- Died: 19 September 2017 (aged 73) Suffolk, England
- Party: Labour
- Spouse: Robert Butler (m. 1964)
- Children: 3 sons

Christine Margaret Butler (née Smith; 14 December 1943 – 19 September 2017) was a British politician who served as member of parliament for Castle Point, representing the Labour Party, between 1997 and 2001.

== Early life ==
She attended Nelson Grammar School (became Walton High School in 1972) on Oxford Road in Nelson, then Middlesex Polytechnic, where she gained a BA. She worked in the pharmaceutical industry then the NHS.

== Political career ==
In 1993 she was elected to Essex County Council.

=== Parliamentary career ===
She was elected Labour Party member of parliament for Castle Point in Essex in 1997. She lost her seat in the 2001 election, to Conservative Party challenger Bob Spink, whom she had defeated, by under 1,000 votes.

== Personal life ==
Butler married Robert Butler in 1964 in Uxbridge, with whom she had three sons. She died in September 2017 at the age of 73 after suffering from dementia.

Parliament of the United Kingdom
Preceded by Bob Spink	Member of Parliament for Castle Point; 1997–2001	Succeeded by Bob Spink
