= PARC Against DARC =

Welsh campaign organisation

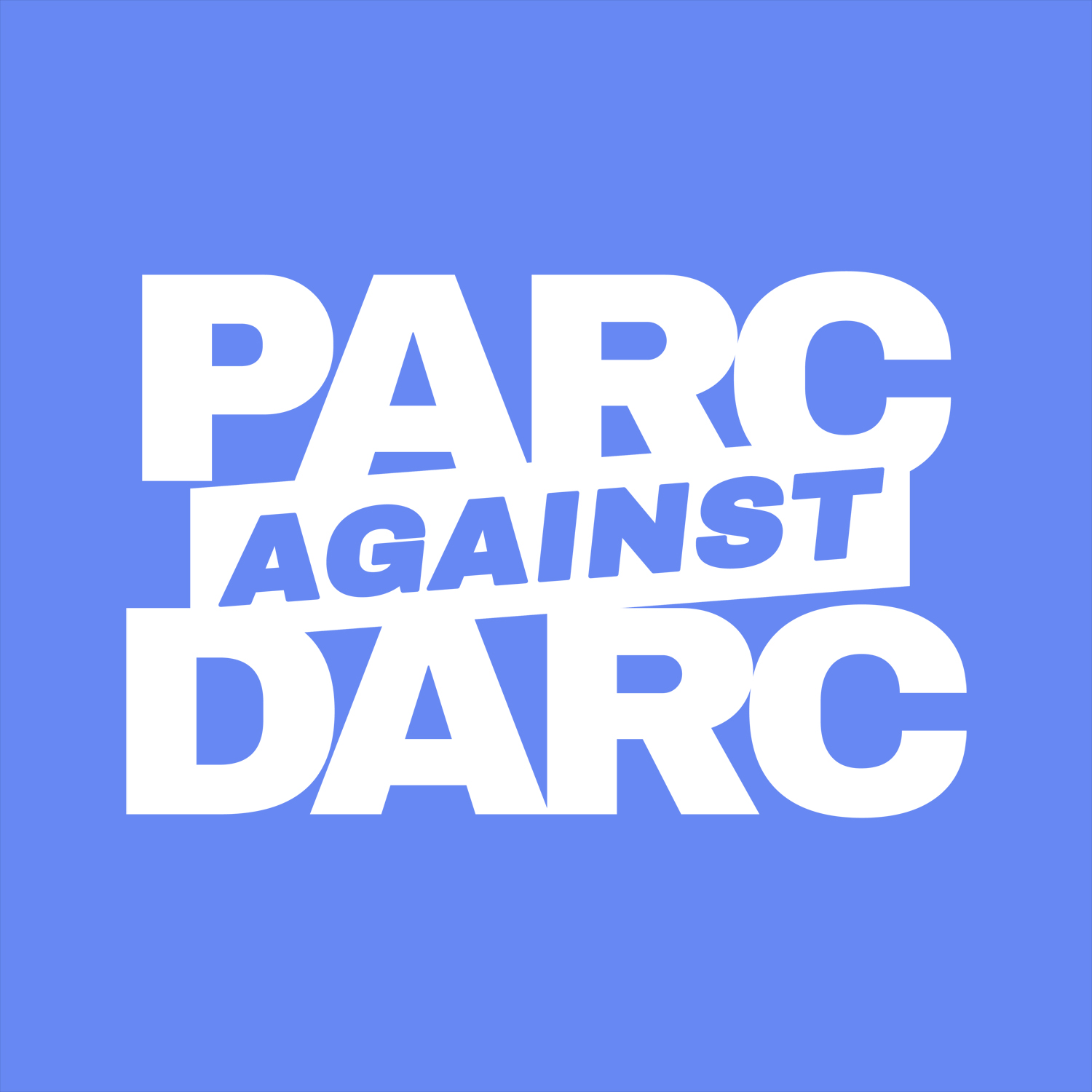
- Predecessor: PARC - Pembrokeshire Against Radar Campaign (1989–1991)
- Formation: PARC Against DARC (2024–present)
- Type: Pressure group
- Purpose: Anti-war, peace
- Headquarters: Pembrokeshire
- Location: Wales
- Region served: United Kingdom
- Website: Official website

PARC Against DARC is a campaign organisation which launched in May 2024 with the intention of stopping UK Ministry of Defence military plans to build one of three of the United States Space Force Deep Space Advanced Radar Capability (DARC) Radar installations at Cawdor Barracks, Brawdy in Pembrokeshire, west Wales, which are also part of the AUKUS trilateral security partnership between Australia, the United Kingdom, and the United States. The Campaign includes some major national organisations such as CND, Stop the War Coalition, Extinction Rebellion UK and The Peace and Justice Project, as well as many local businesses as some of its official supporters.

The Campaign's predecessor; PARC (Pembrokeshire Against Radar Campaign) was originally set up in 1990 when the US Military attempted to build a similarly located Over-the-horizon radar installation on the Dewisland peninsula then. However, the PARC Campaign was so successful and achieved such strong support both locally and nationally that in 1991, the Conservative government were forced to publicly announce cancellation of the project.

With some of the original PARC campaigners actively involved, the newly rebranded campaign PARC Against DARC held its digital launch in May 2024, with a public launch meeting taking place in Solva, near St Davids the following month in June.

== 2024 campaign launch ==
=== Digital launch ===
On 29 May 2024 PARC Against DARC held their digital launch of the revamped campaign, including their website, crowdfunding campaign, petition and Facebook page. The soft launch was covered in several local and national press articles in which the campaign stated that DARC, if built would be "One of the most health-hazardous, tourism-ruining, skyline blighting military installations ever proposed anywhere in the UK." Also posing the question: "When did Dewisland, Pembrokeshire or humankind ever vote for the US military to control all of space?"

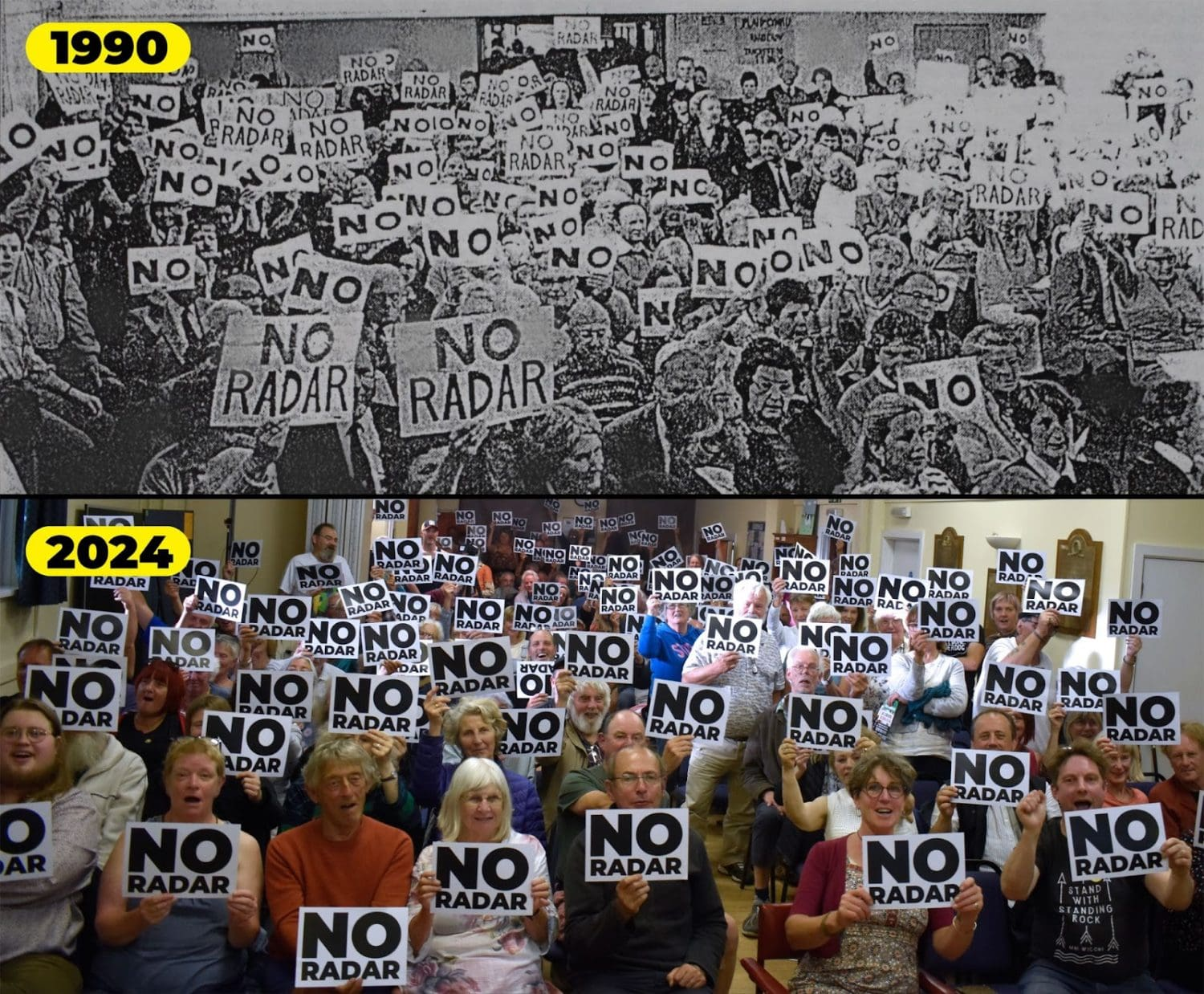
Anti DARC campaigners hold up NO RADAR signs in 2024 replicating 1990 historic meeting.

=== Public meeting ===
On 27 June 2024 a public launch meeting was held at Solva Memorial Hall. It was reported that the meeting was packed as up to 200 concerned residents attended the meeting, filling the venue to its capacity. The meeting was live-streamed and opened with the screening of a 'movie trailer style' campaign launch video. Speeches were given highlighting the key campaign arguments against DARC which focussed on potential health dangers of the radars themselves, damage to local tourism and ecology as well as house prices. A spokesperson for CND Cymru spoke of the implications this increased militarism in Wales could result in. Attendees were urged to lobby their elected representatives at all levels of government and to get involved with the campaign. The meeting concluded with a recreation of a historic PARC meeting from the 1990s with everyone holding up 'No Radar' signs.

== Public Protests ==
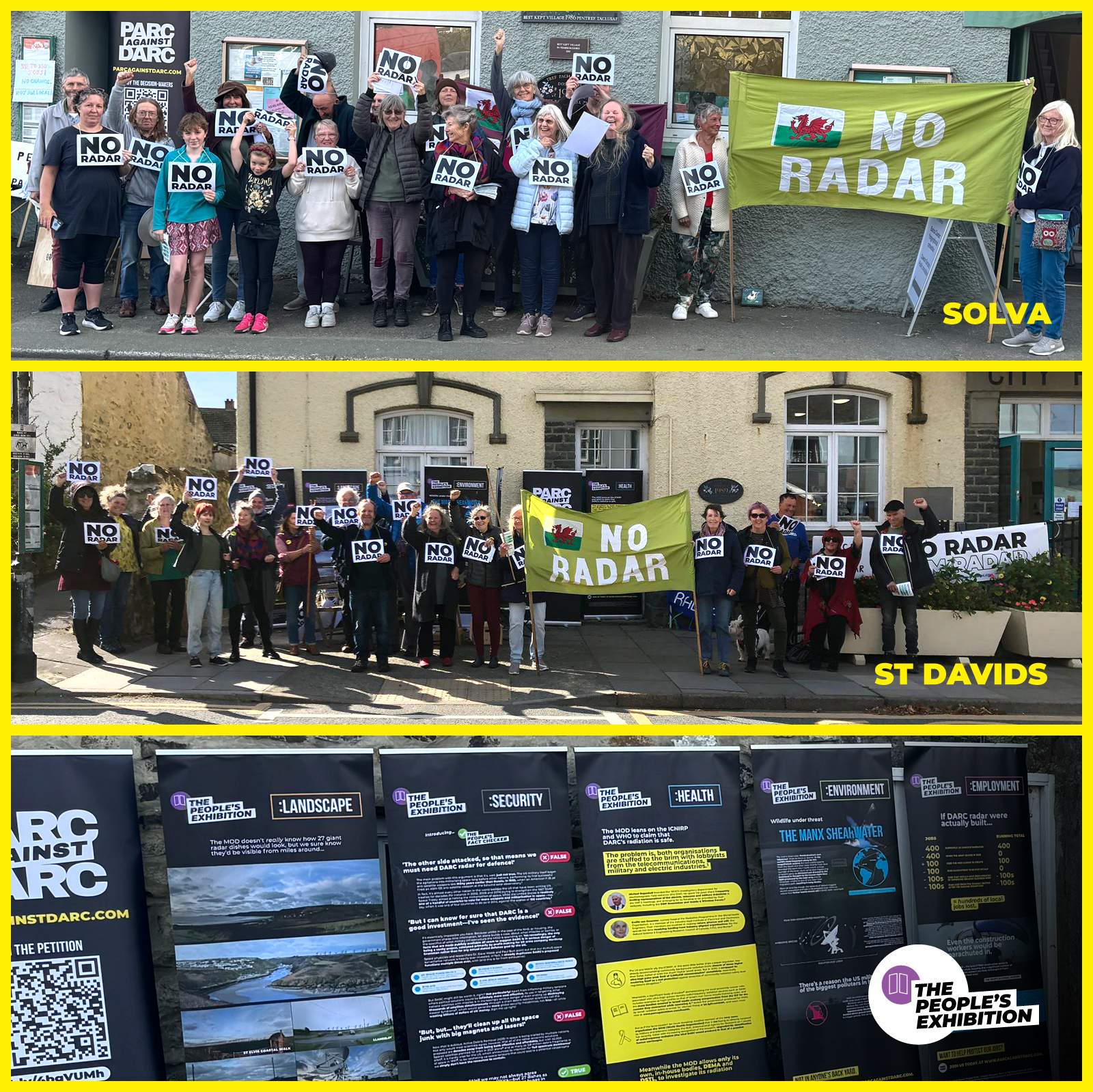
PARC Against DARC campaigners hold People's Exhibition and protests outside MOD events.

=== The People's Exhibition and protests at MoD Public Consultation Events ===
On 13 and 14 September 2024 the campaign held a series of protests outside the MOD's public consultation events in Solva and St Davids respectively. Holding a counter event themed 'The People's Exhibition' which consisted of the campaign's own information boards, DARC opponents also grilled the MOD spokespeople inside the venues, later referring to the MOD Public Engagement exercises as "PR exercise", and reported in the press saying that it had so far been a "gross failing" in terms of their public engagement obligations under 'National Principles of Public Engagement in Wales'.

Several media outlets reported the campaign having said that the consultation meetings had been an “utter shambles” where the so-called experts had given contradictory answers to the same questions, however if quizzed they would then say they “didn't know” or that they "couldn't answer”. One top military officer had been asked if he would stand near one of the radars himself and had been heard to say; “No, I wouldn't stand next to one, that'd be like putting my head in a microwave”.

== Political impact ==
=== 2024 UK General Election ===
The campaign exerted significant pressure on political candidates in the run up to the 2024 UK General Election when it issued a 'Candidate Challenge' to the 15 general election candidates standing in both the local Ceredigion Preseli and the Mid and South Pembrokeshire Parliamentary constituencies. Plaid Cymru candidates Cris Tomos and Ben Lake MP both offering to support a High Court Hearing against DARC. Similarly, Wales Green Party and its candidates publicly supporting the campaign.

=== Political Party support ===
At the Plaid Cymru national conference on 11 October 2024 the party voted on a PARC Against DARC motion to officially oppose and work towards stopping DARC. Presented by Mabon ap Gwynfor MS and supported by former MEP Jill Evans the motion was passed by the conference unanimously. Covered widely in local and national press the vote was reported as a significant moment that would raise the stakes for Welsh Labour to U-turn on their position prior to it becoming a pivotal issue in the 2026 Senedd election. Other parties including Wales Green Party, along with some Labour MSs and MPs such as Beth Winter had officially supported the campaign at its launch.

=== Senedd Cymru ===
On 29 January 2025 Cefin Campbell MS tabled a Statement of Opinion in the Senedd titled 'Opposition to Deep Space Advanced Radar Capability (DARC) in Pembrokeshire'. The statement noted the opposition by Pembrokeshire residents to the Deep Space Advanced Radar Capability (DARC) proposal by the Ministry of Defence as well as concerns regarding the visual and tourism impact of 27 large radar dishes in view of a coastal national park of significant UK importance and national heritage in nearby St Davids. Also noting concerns regarding unaddressed health risks and regional security implications and the petition of 16,000 signatures against the proposal. The statement concluded with a call on the Welsh Government to commission an authoritative impact assessment of the plan to better inform residents and decision-makers. It was given cross-party support by 16 MSs (over one in four) in its first few weeks, five of whom were Labour Party MSs and with the Liberal Democrat's only MS, Jane Dodds also among its supporters. In a press statement Cefin Campbell said: “Plaid Cymru has a long and honourable history of promoting peace and opposing militarism at every level. We cannot support the construction of DARC and give space to American militarism on our land. No assessment has been completed on its impact on tourism, health, or the economy, and the assumption is that it will be harmful on each count.”

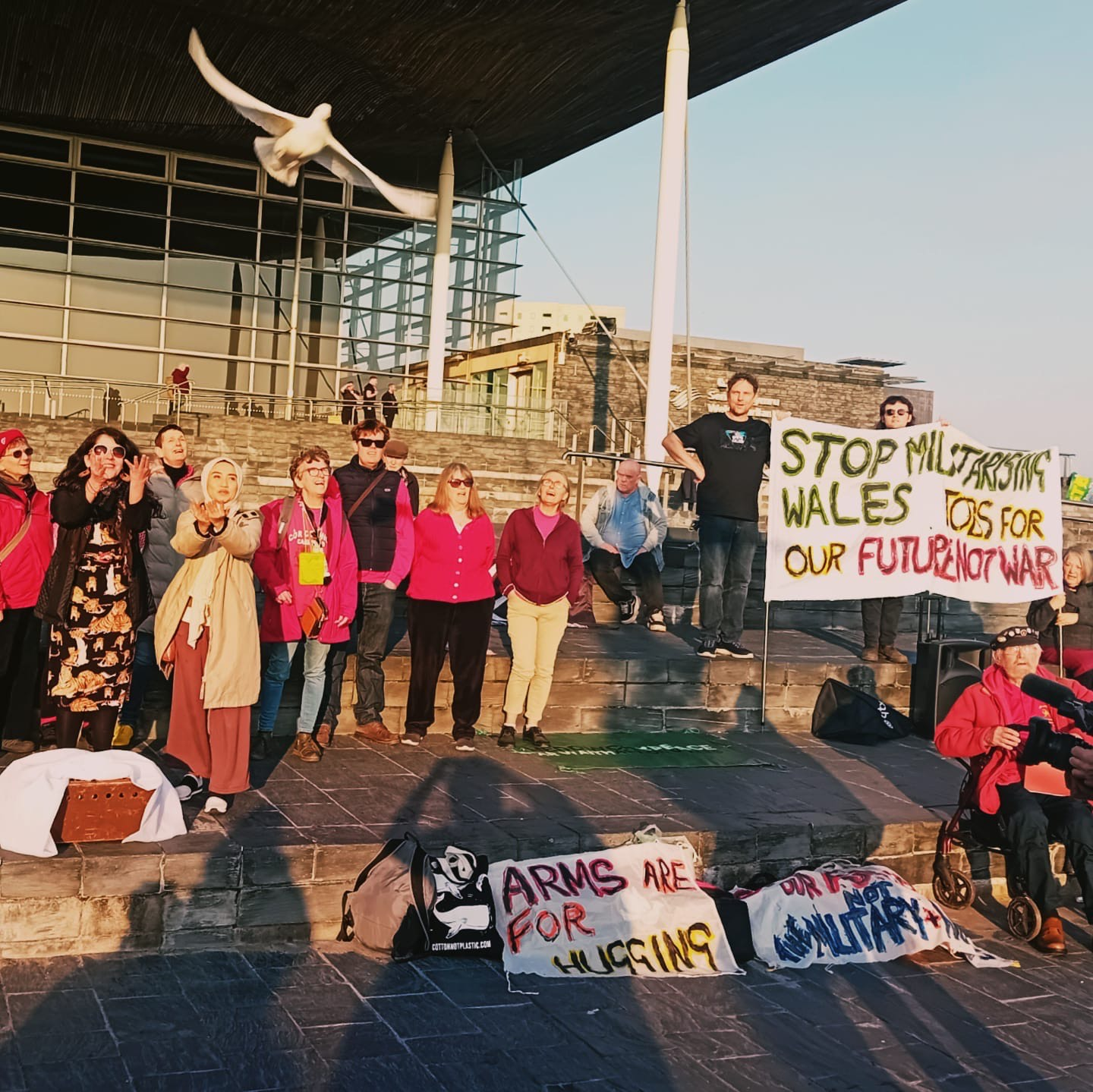
Activists release Peace Doves outside the Senedd

On 5 March 2025 on the United Nations International Day for Disarmament and Non-Proliferation Awareness, PARC Against DARC along with the other key Peace groups in Wales held a peace day at the Senedd. Campaigners gave presentations to Members of the Senedd also issuing briefings detailing actions they wished MS's to take to oppose DARC. Covered widely in the press, the BBC reported the group's concerns with a headline which read: "Radar plans may allow Trump to dominate space from Wales". Other media outlets reported that the campaign had stepped up a gear by gaining significant political backing. A televised vigil for peace was held at the end of the day at which a peace choir sang while two peace Doves were released outside the Senedd building as a symbolic gesture of peace.

=== Parliament of the United Kingdom ===
On 19 March 2025 Liz Saville Roberts MP tabled an Early Day Motion titled 'EDM 975 DARC in Wales' within UK Parliament which opposed DARC and called for plans to be scrapped. The EDM read:

That this House notes with deep concern the proposed US-UK-Australian military radar project, DARC (Deep Space Advanced Radar Capability), which would install 27 21m-high, 15m-wide parabolic radar dishes within sight of the Pembrokeshire Coast National Park; believes this would severely harm the visual landscape, local tourism, and the internationally recognised natural ecology of the area; further notes the concerns regarding potential health risks posed by radiofrequency signals, as indicated by scientific studies, on residential populations located less than a kilometre from the site; highlights that DARC, as part of the AUKUS Treaty, is in violation of the 1967 Outer Space Treaty's prohibition on the national appropriation of space and undermines international law; warns that the deployment of anti-satellite weaponry, for which DARC is a crucial targeting device, threatens to destabilise the civilian satellite network by generating hazardous space debris of a volatile and unpredictable nature which increases the probability of damage to essential infrastructure; urges the Government to recognise that DARC lacks strategic military necessity compared to other priorities; and calls on the government to permanently withdraw its planning application for the Pembrokeshire site and any alternative UK location.

Within its first day the EDM had achieved cross-party support including signatures from the Liberal Democrats defence spokesperson Helen Maguire MP, The Green's Siân Berry MP as well as the now Independent Alliance MP & former Labour Party leader, Jeremy Corbyn.

In press coverage it was reported that PARC Against DARC were specifically highlighting local MP Henry Tufnell's silence on the issue and increasing the pressure on him to take a public stand on the issue. The campaign accused Tufnell of having ignored repeated emails inviting him to declare a position on DARC saying and that residents had reported that he had ignored hundreds or possibly thousands of emails.

== History ==
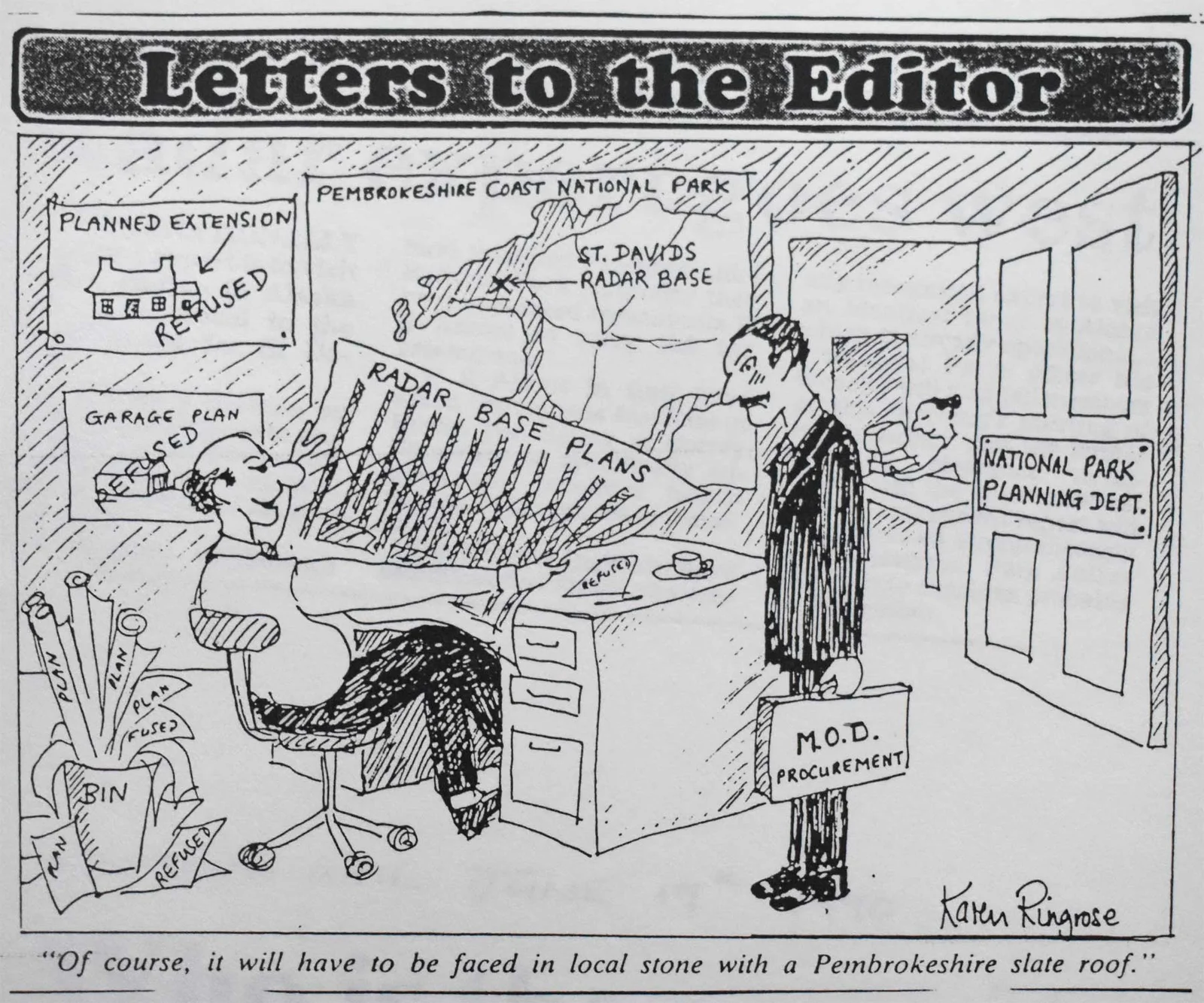
Early Satire in the local letters pages

The original Pembrokeshire Against Radar Campaign (PARC) was formed in March 1990 with the aim of stopping a proposed Over-the-horizon radar installation which was to be sited at the former St Davids Airfield near St Davids and within the National Park, the campaign ran until April 1991, at which point the government cancelled all plans for the radar.

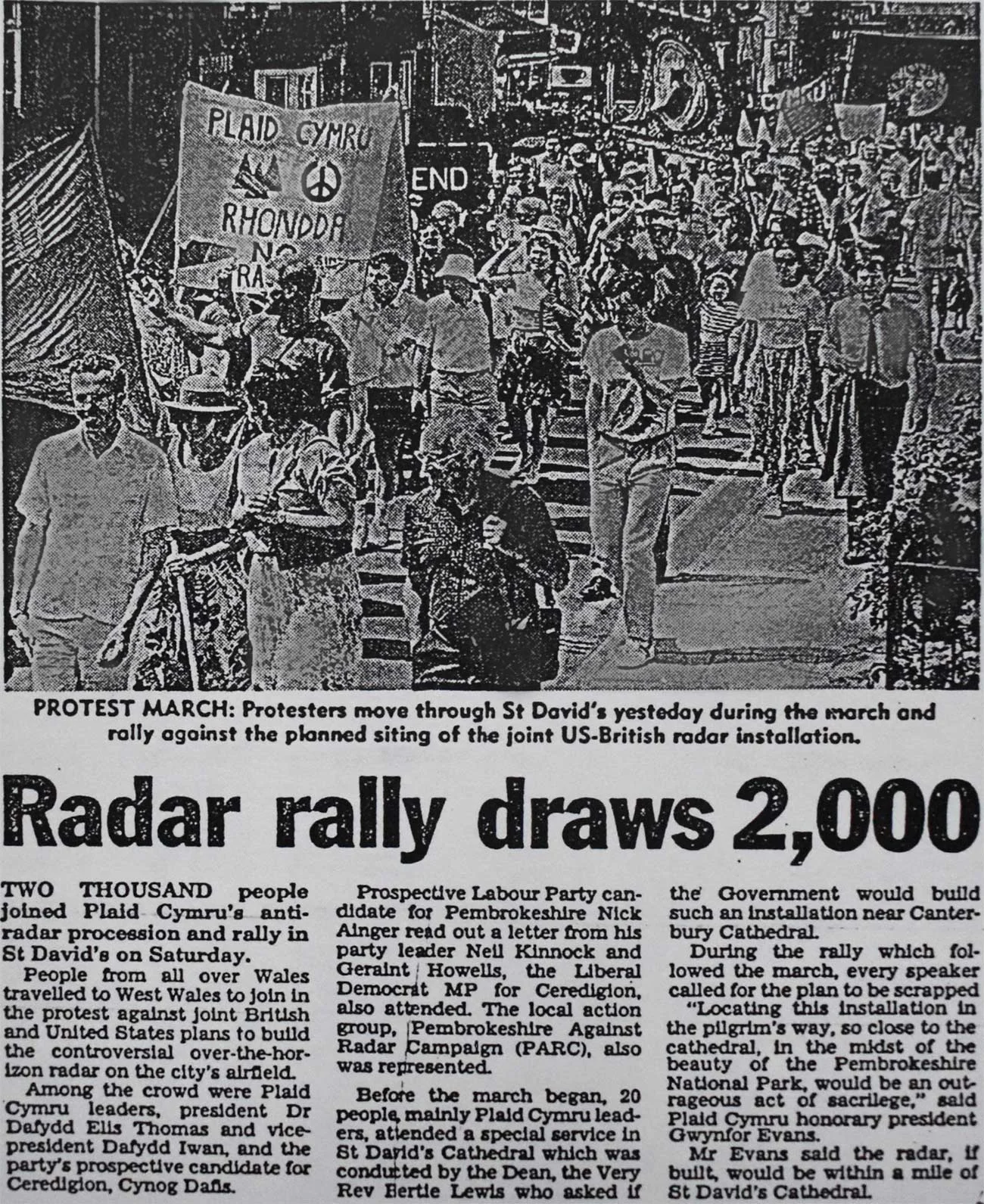
Plaid Cymru 2,000 strong Rally for PARC - Western Mail July 16, 1990

To build support for the campaign PARC wrote to every MP in Britain. They also set about writing to elected representatives at every level of government including 100's of Councillors as well as Senators in the US, they wrote to Clergy people and scientific experts. A packed meeting was held in Solva Memorial Hall and a specialist in the field who PARC had drafted in named Roger Coghill explained to the meeting that if the radar ever went ahead there would need to be evacuations of the surrounding population to form safety buffer zones due to the unsafe levels of radiation which would be omitted. This, along with many other concerns raised at the meeting was enough to turn the local population against the proposed radar and the ensuing public pressure meant that the local Tory MP Nicholas Bennett, was forced to raise questions in Parliament.

A petition was handed in person to the UK Government. Prime Minister Margaret Thatcher, visited Haverfordwest in order to try to stem the flow of opposition to the Radar. By now the entire county and all the local papers had got behind the campaign.

By mid 1990 PARC had become a very organised campaign and began organising protests & fundraising events. They held concerts themed ‘Rock Against the Radar’ as well as fundraising walks, car boot sales, social get togethers & Jumble sales. Plaid Cymru, who were fully behind the campaign, helped to organise a protest march and procession. People travelled from all corners of Wales and beyond to attend the demonstration in which 2,000 people marched from St Davids Cathedral to the proposed site of the Radar. One of the speakers was the well known Welsh Nationalist politician and singer Dafydd Iwan who sang Hen Wlad Fy Nhadau.

Before long PARC had gained support from Neil Kinnock, the then Leader of the Opposition as well as a huge number of local businesses, Town Councils, Church groups and campaign organisations. CND Cymru, Nuclear Free Zones Welsh Forum, Friends of the Earth along with seven local Community Councils, 30 MP's and five from the House of Lords got behind the campaign. The Council for National Parks even joined their ranks. The campaign eventually became international with people lobbying US congressmen and The Bishop of Massachusetts even wrote a strong letter of support to the Archbishop of Wales.

By late April 1991 the Government eventually called time on the radar citing the efforts of PARC as one of their reasons for abandoning their plans. The Minister for Defence Procurement issued a statement in the press which read "we have been reviewing our equipment and have decided not to proceed with this project." The Prime Minister was also quoted in the Western Mail under the headline "Radar Battle Won" on 27 April saying: "The Government was looking for savings across the range of defence activities."

The Pembrokeshire Coast National Park of which the proposed site had been within, would later honour PARC with an award “for its role in protecting the health, landscape, tourism, environment and security of the Pembrokeshire coast.”
