= Rebecca Harris =

British politician (born 1967)

Dame Rebecca Harris DBE MP
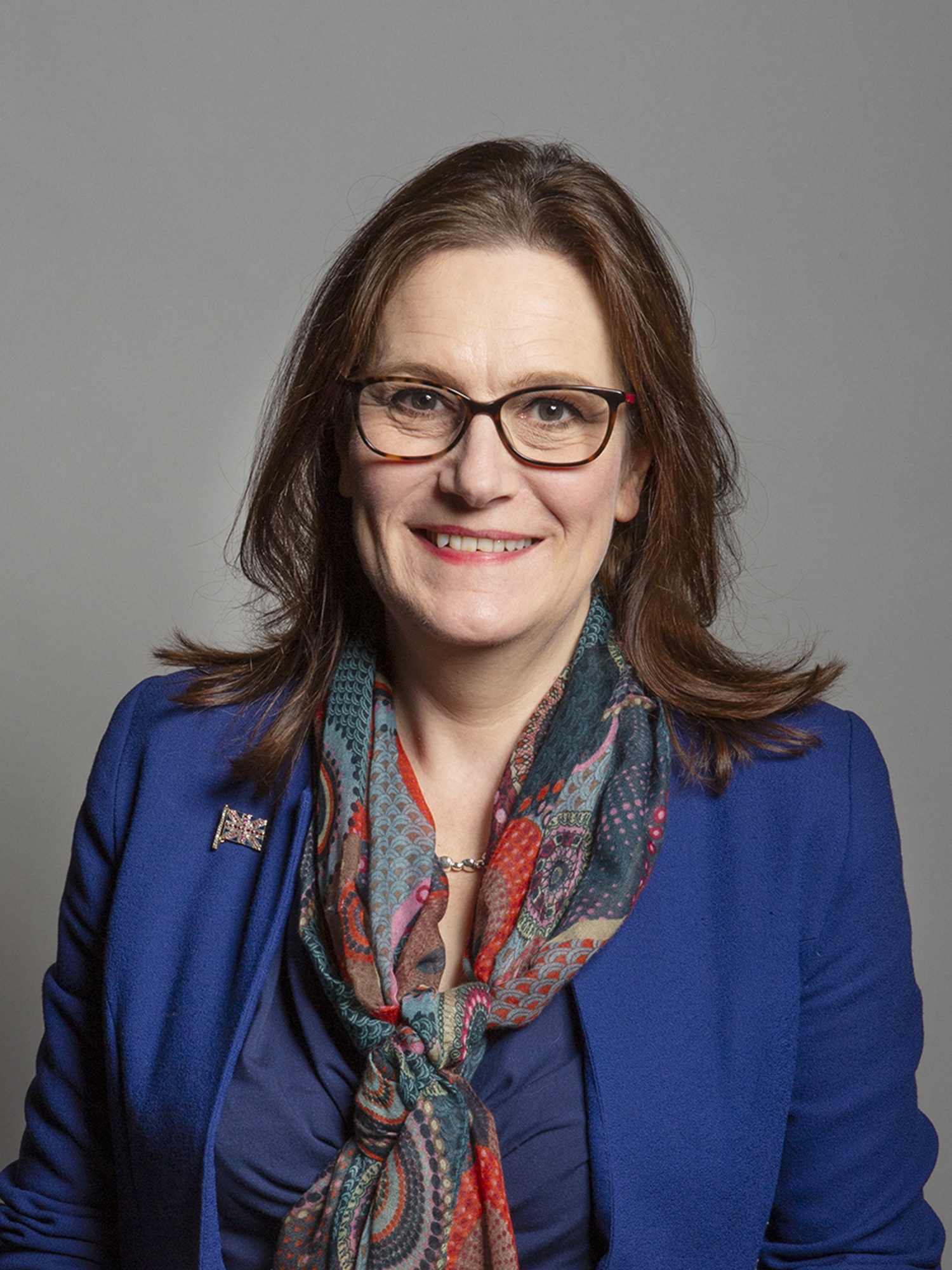
- Official portrait, 2019

Opposition Chief Whip in the House of Commons
- Incumbent
- Assumed office 4 November 2024
- Leader: Kemi Badenoch
- Preceded by: Stuart Andrew

Comptroller of the Household
- In office 8 July 2022 – 5 July 2024
- Prime Minister: Boris Johnson; Liz Truss; Rishi Sunak
- Preceded by: Marcus Jones
- Succeeded by: Chris Elmore

Lord Commissioner of the Treasury
- In office 9 January 2018 – 8 July 2022
- Prime Minister: Theresa May; Boris Johnson

Member of Parliament for Castle Point
- Incumbent
- Assumed office 6 May 2010
- Preceded by: Bob Spink
- Majority: 3,251 (8%)

Personal details
- Born: Elizabeth Rebecca Scott Harris; 22 December 1967 (age 58) Windsor, Berkshire, England
- Party: Conservative
- Education: Bedales School; London School of Economics
- Website: www.rebeccaharris.org

Dame Elizabeth Rebecca Scott Harris DBE (born 22 December 1967) is a British Conservative Party politician who has been the Member of Parliament (MP) for Castle Point since 2010. Since November 2024 she has also served as Opposition Chief Whip.

Harris was the Comptroller of the Household from 2022 to 2024. In that role, she took part in the 2023 Coronation of Charles III and Camilla.

== Early life and career ==
Elizabeth Harris was born on 22 December 1967 in Windsor, Berkshire and was privately educated at the boarding school Bedales, in Hampshire. She then went to university at the London School of Economics, graduating with a BSc. After university, Harris worked with Phillimore & Co publishers, working in warehousing as a delivery driver and sales rep. She eventually joined the board as marketing director. Harris was a Conservative head office campaign co-ordinator during 2000-2001 and Conservative North West London area officer during 2007–2008.

== Parliamentary career ==
At the 2010 general election, Harris was elected to Parliament as MP for Castle Point with 44% of the vote and a majority of 7,632.

In 2012, Harris was named by Conservative Home as one of a minority of loyal Conservative backbench MPs not to have voted against the government in any significant rebellions.

She was a member of the Business, Innovation and Skills Committee and championed the Daylight Saving Bill which would have moved Britain onto Central European Time. On 20 January 2012, the legislation ran out of time to progress, meaning that the United Kingdom would remain on Western European Time.

In March 2015, Harris and her entourage recorded video footage of allegedly speeding motorbikers and handed them to the police, after spotting them whilst canvassing. Local residents had complained of the street being used for road racing.

At the 2015 general election, Harris was re-elected as MP for Castle Point with an increased vote share of 50.9% and an increased majority of 8,934.

Prior to the 2016 Brexit referendum, Harris stated her support for Britain to leave the European Union.

Harris was re-elected at the snap 2017 general election with an increased vote share of 67.3% and an increased majority of 18,872.

At the 2019 general election, Harris was again re-elected with an increased vote share of 76.7% and an increased majority of 26,634. This was the largest Conservative vote share of the entire election.

Harris was appointed Dame Commander of the Order of the British Empire in the 2024 Birthday Honours List for Political and Public Service.

Harris was again re-elected at the 2024 general election, with a decreased vote share of 38.1% and a decreased majority of 3,251.

Following the victory of Kemi Badenoch in the 2024 leadership election, Harris was appointed Chief Whip of the Conservative Party.

== Electoral history ==
General election 2024: Castle Point
| Party | Candidate | Votes | % | ±% |
|---|---|---|---|---|
| Conservative | Rebecca Harris | 15,485 | 38.1 | −38.4 |
| Reform | Keiron McGill | 12,234 | 30.1 | N/A |
| Labour | Mark Maguire | 9,455 | 23.3 | +6.5 |
| Green | Bob Chapman | 2,118 | 5.2 | N/A |
| Liberal Democrats | James Willis | 1,341 | 3.3 | −3.3 |
| Majority | | 3,251 | 8.0 | −52.1 |
| Turnout | | 40,633 | 57.6 | −6.2 |
| Registered electors | | 70,552 | | |
| Conservative hold | | Swing | | |

Parliament of the United Kingdom
| Preceded by Bob Spink | Member of Parliament for Castle Point; 2010–present | Incumbent |
Political offices
| Preceded by Stuart Andrew | Opposition Chief Whip in the House of Commons; 2024–present | Incumbent |
Party political offices
| Preceded by Stuart Andrew | Conservative Chief Whip of the House of Commons; 2024–present | Incumbent |
