= Bob Spink =

British politician (born 1948)

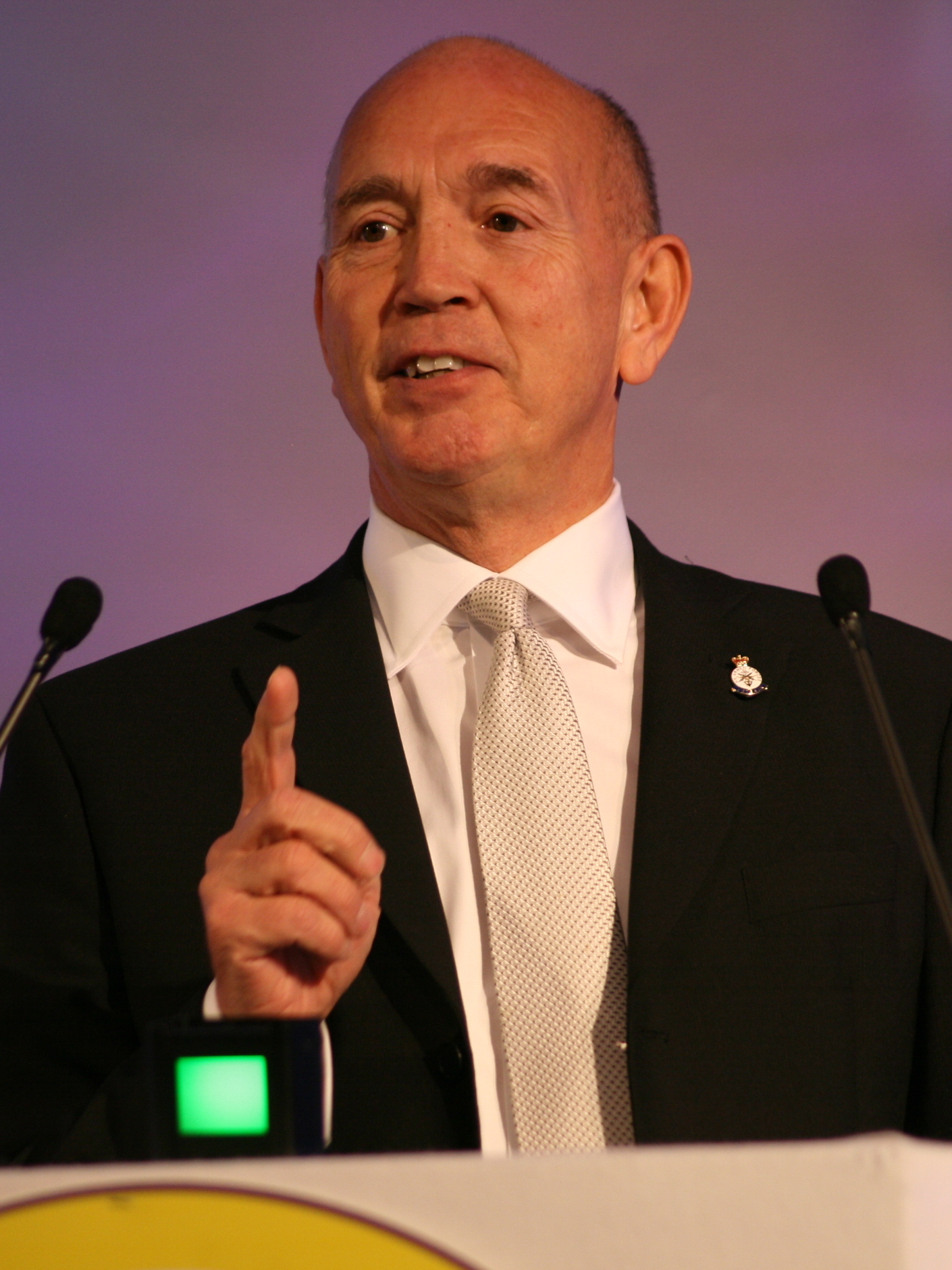

Member of Parliament for Castle Point
- In office 7 June 2001 – 12 April 2010
- Preceded by: Christine Butler
- Succeeded by: Rebecca Harris
- In office 9 April 1992 – 8 April 1997
- Preceded by: Sir Bernard Braine
- Succeeded by: Christine Butler

Personal details
- Born: 1 August 1948 (age 78) Haworth, West Riding of Yorkshire, England
- Other political affiliations: Conservative (until 2008); UKIP (2008, 2014-)
- Spouse: Janet Barham (divorced)
- Education: University of Manchester, Cranfield University
- Profession: Member of Parliament
- Website: Bob Spink MP

Robert Michael Spink (born 1 August 1948) is a British former politician who was a member of parliament (MP) for Castle Point in Essex (1992 to 1997, and 2001 to 2010).

Spink was elected as the Conservative Party MP for Castle Point in 1992, lost his seat in 1997, but regained it in 2001. Having resigned the Conservative whip in March 2008, in April 2008 he defected to the UK Independence Party (UKIP), becoming that party's first MP. In November 2008, he became an independent. Standing as an independent, he lost his seat in the 2010 election to the Conservative candidate, Rebecca Harris.

Spink subsequently rejoined UKIP. In 2017, he was convicted on four counts of electoral fraud, and was given a six-month prison sentence, suspended for two years, in January 2018.

== Early life ==
He was educated at Holycroft Secondary Modern School (now a primary school) on Victoria Road in Keighley and Southall Technical College. At the University of Manchester, he gained a BSc Hons (1st) in 1972. At Cranfield University, he gained an MSc in industrial engineering and administration in 1975 and PhD in economics and management in 1988.

He joined the Royal Air Force (RAF) in 1964 and, until 1966, did his basic training at RAF Cosford and RAF Uxbridge, being invalided. He was an engineer for EMI Electronics Ltd from 1966 to 1977 in Hayes and gained an Ordinary National Certificate (ONC) from Southall Technical College in 1969 when on day-release, then became an industrial management consultant in 1977 for Harold Whitehead and Partners. From 1980 to 1984, he was a director of Seafarer Navigation International Ltd (eventually bought by Standard Communications) in Bournemouth and, from 1989 to 1993, he was a non-executive director of Bournemouth Airport. From 1984 to 1993, he was a management consultant. From 1997 to 2001, he worked for Harold Whitehead in Windsor. He was a county councillor in Dorset from 1985 to 1992.

== Parliamentary career ==
In May 1994, Spink presented an adjournment debate in the House of Commons in strong opposition to proposals to reduce the age of consent for homosexual acts from 21 to 18 The age of consent was later reduced to 18 after the passing of the Criminal Justice and Public Order Act 1994.

In April 2005, before the general election, Spink placed an advertisement in the local Yellow Advertiser newspaper criticising the Labour government's record against illegal immigration. His rival for the constituency, the Labour candidate Luke Akehurst, denounced Spink's advert as provoking racial tension. Spink won the election increasing his share of the vote by 3.7%.

In March 2008, Spink announced to the UK House of Commons that he had resigned the Conservative Party whip because of "criminal and other irregularities" in his constituency. Soon afterwards, in April 2008, he joined UK Independence Party and therefore became it first member of parliament. He later found himself at odds with his new party over the issue of whether or not to extend the amount of time a suspect can be detained without charge from 28 to 42 days. He voted for the bill, but UKIP opposed it.

Spink is opposed to abortion and supports the reintroduction of capital punishment. He is against research into animal chimeras.

In March 2010, Spink confirmed he was encouraging candidates to stand in local elections under the label "Independent Save Our Green Belt". At the 2010 general election, he stood as an independent candidate, but made it clear that he was supporting UKIP. UKIP aided his election campaign and he received 27% of the vote, but lost Castle Point to the Conservative Rebecca Harris. In 2014, he rejoined UKIP.

== Electoral fraud ==
In January 2018, Spink was given a six-month suspended prison sentence with 150 hours community service and ordered to pay £5,000 costs, for electoral fraud. He had tricked elderly and infirm constituents into signing election nomination forms which they believed were petitions. They did not know they were to nominate a UKIP candidate or that Spink represented UKIP. Sentencing, Judge Ian Graham said, "This sort of offending undermines the working of democratic structures in this country. The democratic process depends on the good faith of those who engage in it, because a lot of what happens is of course quite difficult to police."

== Personal life ==
He married Janet Barham and they have three sons and a daughter. They have since divorced.

Parliament of the United Kingdom
Preceded by Bernard Braine	Member of parliament for Castle Point; 1992 – 1997	Succeeded by Christine Butler
Preceded by Christine Butler	Member of parliament for Castle Point; 2001 – 2010	Succeeded by Rebecca Harris
