= Richard Tufnell =

British politician (1896–1956)

Richard Lionel Tufnell (10 December 1896 – 1 October 1956) was a Conservative Party politician in the United Kingdom.

Richard Tufnell was son of Edward Tufnell, Member of Parliament for South East Essex, and his wife Ellen Bertha Gubbins. His grandfather was the civil servant and educationalist Edward Carleton Tufnell. He was educated at the Royal Naval Colleges at Osborne and Dartmouth and at Trinity College, Cambridge, where he took an MA.

He was elected as the member of parliament for Cambridge at a by-election in 1934, following the ennoblement of the Conservative MP Sir George Newton as Baron Eltisley.

Tufnell retained the seat at the 1935 general election, but ten years later at the 1945 general election, he lost his seat to Arthur Symonds of the Labour Party.

His Great-Grandson Henry has been the Labour MP for Mid and South Pembrokeshire since 4th July 2024

Parliament of the United Kingdom
Preceded by Sir George Newton	Member of Parliament for Cambridge; 1934–1945	Succeeded by Arthur Symonds
