= South East Essex (constituency) =

Parliamentary constituency in the United Kingdom, 1885–1950 & 1955–1983

- Former borough constituency for the House of Commons
- South East Essex, showing boundaries used from 1955–1974

1955–1983
- Seats: one
- Created from: Billericay and Southend East
- Replaced by: Castle Point and Rochford

1885–1950
- Seats: one
- Created from: East Essex, South Essex
- Replaced by: Billericay and Southend East

South East Essex was a parliamentary constituency in Essex in the East of England. It returned one Member of Parliament (MP) to the House of Commons of the Parliament of the United Kingdom.

== History ==
South East Essex (formally the South Eastern division of Essex in its first incarnation) was one of eight single-member divisions of Essex (later classified as county constituencies) created by the Redistribution of Seats Act 1885, replacing the three two member divisions of East, South and West Essex.

The seat was reduced considerably in size under the Representation of the People Act 1918 and again in the interim redistribution carried out for the 1945 general election, before being abolished for the 1950 general election.

The constituency was re-established for the 1955 general election, and abolished again for the 1983 general election.

== Boundaries and boundary changes ==
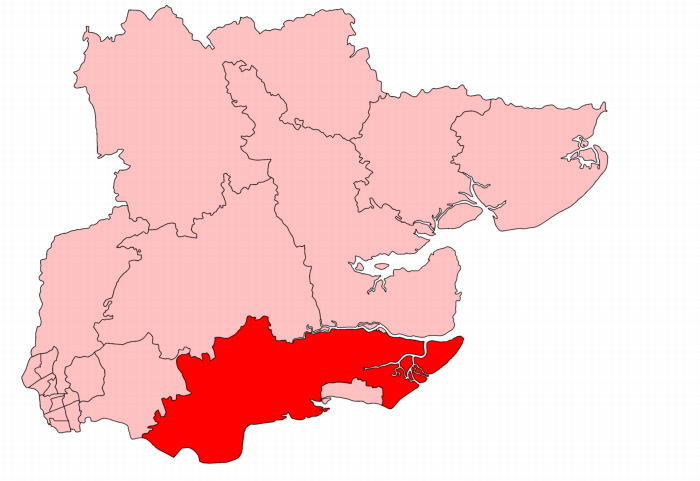
South East Essex, showing boundaries used from 1918 to 1945

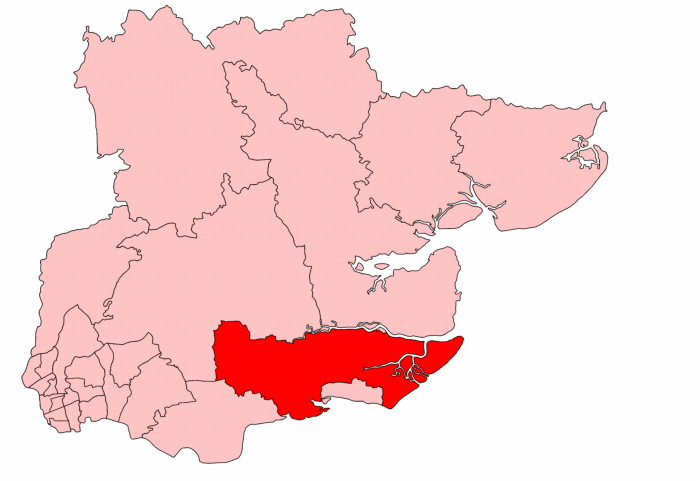
South East Essex, showing boundaries used from 1945 to 1950

=== 1885–1918 ===
- The Sessional Divisions of Dengie, Orsett, and Rochford; and
- The civil parishes of Rainham and Wennington.

Formed primarily from the abolished South Division of Essex, together with the southern part of the abolished East Division (Dengie peninsular). See below for areas covered.

=== 1918–1945 ===
- The Urban Districts of Grays Thurrock, Shoeburyness, and Tilbury;
- The Rural Districts of Orsett and Rochford; and
- Part of the Rural District of Billericay.

Gained southernmost parts of Chelmsford Division of Essex, including Billericay. The area between River Crouch and River Blackwater (Dengie peninsular), including Burnham-on-Crouch, was transferred to Maldon and the westernmost area, including Rainham, to Romford. Parts comprising Southend-on-Sea County Borough created as a separate Parliamentary Borough.

=== 1945–1950 ===
- The Urban Districts of Benfleet, Billericay, Canvey Island, and Rayleigh;
- The Rural District of Rochford; and
- Part of the County Borough of Southend-on-Sea.

The House of Commons (Redistribution of Seats) Act 1944 set up Boundaries Commissions to carry out periodic reviews of the distribution of parliamentary constituencies. It also authorised an initial review to subdivide abnormally large constituencies in time for the 1945 election. This was implemented by the Redistribution of Seats Order 1945 under which South East Essex was divided into two constituencies. As a consequence, the Urban District of Thurrock (created largely from amalgamating the Urban Districts of Grays Thurrock and Tilbury and the Rural District of Orsett) was formed as the new Thurrock Division of Essex. Other marginal changes resulting from changes to local authority boundaries.

Following the First Periodic Review of Westminster constituencies the seat was abolished. The bulk of the Division, comprising the Urban Districts of Benfleet, Billericay, Canvey Island and Rayleigh, formed the new County Constituency of Billericay. The Rural District of Rochford, and the parts of the County Borough of Southend-on-Sea (Shoeburyness), included in the new constituency of Southend East.

=== 1955–1974 ===
- The Urban Districts of Benfleet, Canvey Island, and Rayleigh; and
- The Rural District of Rochford.

Re-established as a County Constituency. Benfleet, Canvey Island and Rayleigh were transferred back from Billericay, and Rochford from Southend East.

=== 1974–1983 ===
- The Urban Districts of Benfleet, Canvey Island, and Rayleigh.

The Rural District of Rochford was now transferred to Maldon.

On abolition for the second time, Benfleet and Canvey Island (which now comprised the District of Castle Point) formed the new constituency of Castle Point. Rayleigh had been incorporated into the District of Rochford and was included in the new constituency of Rochford.

=== Areas covered ===
Area	1885	1918	1945	1950	1955	1974	1983
Dengie peninsular, Burnham-on-Crouch	South East Essex	Maldon (part)					South Colchester and Maldon (part)
Southend-on-Sea: West	South East Essex	Southend-on-Sea		Southend West			
East	South East Essex	Southend-on-Sea		Southend East	Southend East		
Shoeburyness	South East Essex	South East Essex	South East Essex	Southend East	Southend East		
Rochford	South East Essex	South East Essex	South East Essex	Southend East	South East Essex	Maldon (part)	Rochford
Rayleigh	South East Essex	South East Essex	South East Essex	Billericay	South East Essex	South East Essex	Rochford
South Benfleet, Canvey Island	South East Essex	South East Essex	South East Essex	Billericay	South East Essex	South East Essex	Castle Point
Billericay, Wickford	Chelmsford (part)	South East Essex	South East Essex	Billericay	Billericay (part)	Basildon	Billericay
Basildon	Chelmsford (part)	South East Essex	South East Essex	Billericay	Billericay (part)	Basildon	Basildon
Tilbury, Grays, Orsett	South East Essex	South East Essex	Thurrock				
Rainham	South East Essex	Romford (part)	Hornchurch (part)				

== Members of Parliament ==
=== MPs 1885–1950 ===
Election	Member	Party
1885	constituency created (South Essex divided)	
1885	William Makins	Conservative
1886	Carne Rasch	Conservative
1900	Edward Tufnell	Conservative
1906	Rowland Whitehead	Liberal
Jan. 1910	John Kirkwood	Conservative
1912 by-election	Rupert Guinness	Unionist
1918	Frank Hilder	Unionist
1923	Philip Hoffman	Labour
1924	Herbert Looker	Unionist
1929	Jack Oldfield	Labour
1931	Victor Raikes	Conservative
1945	Ray Gunter	Labour
1950	constituency abolished	

=== MPs 1955–1983 ===
Election	Member	Party
1955	constituency re-established	
1955	Bernard Braine	Conservative
1983	constituency abolished	

== Elections ==
=== Elections in the 1880s ===
William Wills

General election 1885: South East Essex
Party	Candidate	Votes	%	±%
Conservative	William Makins	3,707	51.4	
Liberal	William Wills	3,500	48.6	
Majority		207	2.8	
Turnout		7,207	76.9	
Registered electors		9,367		
Conservative win (new seat)				

General election 1886: South East Essex
Party	Candidate	Votes	%	±%
Conservative	Carne Rasch	3,758	56.3	+4.9
Liberal	William Wills	2,916	43.7	−4.9
Majority		842	12.6	+9.8
Turnout		6,674	71.3	−5.6
Registered electors		9,367		
Conservative hold		Swing	+4.9	

=== Elections in the 1890s ===
General election 1892: South East Essex
Party	Candidate	Votes	%	±%
Conservative	Carne Rasch	4,901	52.9	−3.4
Liberal	Edmund Wright Brooks	4,359	47.1	+3.4
Majority		542	5.8	−6.8
Turnout		9,260	77.4	+6.1
Registered electors		11,960		
Conservative hold		Swing	−3.4	

General election 1895: South East Essex
Party	Candidate	Votes	%	±%
Conservative	Carne Rasch	5,460	60.8	+7.9
Liberal	David Milne-Watson	3,520	39.2	−7.9
Majority		1,940	21.6	+15.8
Turnout		8,980	65.8	−11.6
Registered electors		13,640		
Conservative hold		Swing	+7.9	

=== Elections in the 1900s ===
General election 1900: South East Essex
Party	Candidate	Votes	%	±%
Conservative	Edward Tufnell	5,815	56.6	−4.2
Liberal	Rowland Whitehead	4,461	43.4	+4.2
Majority		1,354	13.2	−8.4
Turnout		10,276	67.7	+1.9
Registered electors		15,169		
Conservative hold		Swing	−4.2	

General election 1906: South East Essex
Party	Candidate	Votes	%	±%
Liberal	Rowland Whitehead	9,230	56.3	+12.9
Conservative	John Pretyman Newman	7,170	43.7	−12.9
Majority		2,060	12.6	N/A
Turnout		16,400	79.6	+11.9
Registered electors		20,591		
Liberal gain from Conservative		Swing	+12.9	

=== Elections in the 1910s ===
Kirkwood

General election January 1910: South East Essex
Party	Candidate	Votes	%	±%
Conservative	John Hendley Morrison Kirkwood	11,199	54.7	+11.0
Liberal	Rowland Whitehead	9,288	45.3	−11.0
Majority		1,911	9.4	N/A
Turnout		20,487	83.1	+3.5
Registered electors		24,645		
Conservative gain from Liberal		Swing	+11.0	

General election December 1910: South East Essex
Party	Candidate	Votes	%	±%
Conservative	John Hendley Morrison Kirkwood	10,108	53.2	−1.5
Liberal	John Henry Burrows	8,891	46.8	+1.5
Majority		1,217	6.4	−3.0
Turnout		18,999	77.1	−6.0
Registered electors		24,645		
Conservative hold		Swing	−1.5	

1912 South East Essex by-election
Party	Candidate	Votes	%	±%
Unionist	Rupert Guinness	Unopposed		
Unionist hold				

General Election 1914–15:

Another General Election was required to take place before the end of 1915. The political parties had been making preparations for an election to take place and by July 1914, the following candidates had been selected;

- Unionist: Rupert Guinness
- Liberal:

General election 1918: South East Essex
Party		Candidate	Votes	%	±%
C	Unionist	Frank Hilder	11,703	63.6	+10.4
	Labour	Joe Cotter	5,343	29.0	New
	Liberal	Sydney Robinson	1,372	7.4	−39.4
Majority			6,360	34.6	+28.2
Turnout			18,418	50.9	−26.2
Registered electors			36,213		
	Unionist hold		Swing	+24.9	
C indicates candidate endorsed by the coalition government.

=== Elections in the 1920s ===
General election 1922: Essex South East
Party	Candidate	Votes	%	±%
Unionist	Frank Hilder	13,522	54.1	−9.5
Labour	Philip Hoffman	11,459	45.9	+16.9
Majority		2,063	8.2	−26.4
Turnout		24,981	58.9	+8.0
Registered electors		42,406		
Unionist hold		Swing	−13.2	

General election 1923: Essex South East
Party	Candidate	Votes	%	±%
Labour	Philip Hoffman	13,979	53.0	+7.1
Unionist	Frank Hilder	12,379	47.0	−7.1
Majority		1,600	6.0	N/A
Turnout		26,358	58.1	−0.8
Registered electors		45,363		
Labour gain from Unionist		Swing	+7.1	

General election 1924: Essex South East
Party	Candidate	Votes	%	±%
Unionist	Herbert Looker	19,731	58.8	+11.8
Labour	Philip Hoffman	13,820	41.2	−11.8
Majority		5,911	17.6	N/A
Turnout		33,551	69.3	+11.2
Registered electors		48,412		
Unionist gain from Labour		Swing	+11.8	

General election 1929: Essex South East
Party	Candidate	Votes	%	±%
Labour	Jack Oldfield	18,756	37.6	−3.6
Unionist	Herbert Looker	18,130	36.3	−22.5
Liberal	George Thomas Veness	13,030	26.1	New
Majority		626	1.3	N/A
Turnout		49,916	65.3	−4.0
Registered electors		76,466		
Labour gain from Unionist		Swing	+9.5	

=== Elections in the 1930s ===
General election 1931: Essex South East
Party	Candidate	Votes	%	±%
Conservative	Victor Raikes	30,436	53.4	+17.1
Labour	Jack Oldfield	20,066	35.2	−2.4
National Labour	Felix Greene	6,539	11.5	New
Majority		10,370	18.2	N/A
Turnout		57,041	66.8	+1.5
Conservative gain from Labour		Swing		

General election 1935: Essex South East
Party	Candidate	Votes	%	±%
Conservative	Victor Raikes	25,912	44.2	−9.2
Labour	Jack Oldfield	24,942	42.5	+7.3
Liberal	Arthur Musgrove Mathews	7,797	13.3	New
Majority		970	1.7	−16.5
Turnout		58,651	59.5	−7.3
Conservative hold		Swing		

=== Elections in the 1940s ===
General election 1945: Essex South East
Party	Candidate	Votes	%	±%
Labour	Ray Gunter	25,581	53.8	+11.3
Conservative	Aubrey Jones	21,990	46.2	+2.0
Majority		3,591	7.6	N/A
Turnout		47,571	65.8	+6.3
Labour gain from Conservative		Swing		

=== Elections in the 1950s ===
General election 1955: Essex South East
Party	Candidate	Votes	%	±%
Conservative	Bernard Braine	20,531	59.73	
Labour Co-op	Edward W Harby	13,841	40.27	
Majority		6,690	19.46	
Turnout		34,372	72.93	
Registered electors		47,132		
Conservative win (new seat)				

General election 1959: Essex South East
Party	Candidate	Votes	%	±%
Conservative	Bernard Braine	28,124	60.99	+1.26
Labour	Reginald M Fryer	17,991	39.01	−1.26
Majority		10,133	21.98	+2.52
Turnout		46,115	76.46	+3.53
Registered electors		60,315		
Conservative hold		Swing	+1.26	

=== Elections in the 1960s ===
General election 1964: Essex South East
Party	Candidate	Votes	%	±%
Conservative	Bernard Braine	33,494	56.98	−4.01
Labour	Anthony Pearson-Clarke	25,293	43.02	+4.01
Majority		8,201	13.96	−8.02
Turnout		58,787	75.02	−1.44
Registered electors		78,364		
Conservative hold		Swing	−4.01	

General election 1966: Essex South East
Party	Candidate	Votes	%	±%
Conservative	Bernard Braine	31,942	48.50	−8.48
Labour	Derek W Edwards	26,208	39.80	−3.22
Liberal	Joyce Arram	7,706	11.70	New
Majority		5,734	8.70	−5.26
Turnout		65,856	77.34	+2.32
Registered electors		85.151		
Conservative hold		Swing	−2.63	

=== Elections in the 1970s ===
General election 1970: Essex South East
Party	Candidate	Votes	%	±%
Conservative	Bernard Braine	41,589	57.70	+9.20
Labour	Derek W Edwards	23,684	32.86	−6.94
Liberal	Christopher H Bohling	6,811	9.45	−2.25
Majority		17,905	24.84	+16.14
Turnout		72,084	71.86	−5.48
Registered electors		85,151		
Conservative hold		Swing	+8.07	

General election February 1974: Essex South East
Party	Candidate	Votes	%	±%
Conservative	Bernard Braine	28,644	46.26	−11.44
Labour	David Bryn Jones	19,379	31.30	−1.56
Liberal	Frances Alexander	13,891	22.44	+12.99
Majority		9,265	14.96	−13.88
Turnout		61,914	82.09	+10.23
Registered electors		75,394		
Conservative hold		Swing	−4.94	

General election October 1974: Essex South East
Party	Candidate	Votes	%	±%
Conservative	Bernard Braine	27,348	48.81	+2.54
Labour	David Bryn Jones	18,638	33.26	+1.96
Liberal	Anthony Morris	10,049	17.93	−4.50
Majority		8,710	15.55	+0.59
Turnout		56,035	73.74	−8.35
Registered electors		76,013		
Conservative hold		Swing	+0.29	

General election 1979: Essex South East
Party	Candidate	Votes	%	±%
Conservative	Bernard Braine	40,497	63.96	+15.15
Labour	Nigel Smith	15,965	25.21	−8.05
Liberal	Frances Alexander	6,858	10.83	−7.10
Majority		24,532	38.75	+23.20
Turnout		63,320	76.89	+3.15
Registered electors		82,350		
Conservative hold		Swing	+11.60	
