= Jack Oldfield =

British politician

Member of Parliament for South East Essex
- In office 30 May 1929 – 7 October 1931
- Preceded by: Herbert Looker
- Succeeded by: Victor Raikes

Personal details
- Born: 5 July 1899 London, England
- Died: 11 December 1999 (aged 100) Doddington, Kent, England
- Party: Labour (1920–1964); Conservative (1964–1999)
- Spouse: Jonnet Elizabeth Richards (m. 1953)
- Occupation: Landowner

John Richard Anthony Oldfield (5 July 1899 – 11 December 1999) was a British landowner and politician.

The son of Major H.E. Oldfield of the Royal Field Artillery, his father was killed in action two days before his first birthday during the Second Anglo-Boer War. With his widowed mother, he moved home many times, spending much time at Doddington Place Gardens, Kent, which had been purchased by his grandfather and aunt in 1906.

Educated at Eton College, Oldfield was commissioned as an officer in the Grenadier Guards in the latter stages of the First World War. In 1920, he entered Trinity College, Cambridge. While at Cambridge, he converted from Anglicanism to Roman Catholicism. He also took an interest in social matters, and began voluntary work at Toynbee Hall in the East End of London and joined the Labour Party in the early 1920s.

At the 1929 general election he was elected as member of parliament for South East Essex. With the formation of the Second Labour Government he was appointed Parliamentary Private Secretary to the Secretary of State for Air, Lord Thomson. Thomson was killed when the R101 airship crashed on its maiden voyage in October 1930, and Oldfield returned to the backbenches.

With the formation of a National Government in August 1931, the parliamentary Labour Party was divided into two factions, with supporters of Prime Minister Ramsay MacDonald forming the National Labour Organisation and the remaining MPs moving to the opposition benches. Oldfield chose to join the latter group, and when a general election was held in October 1931, was defeated along with most of his Labour colleagues. He attempted to regain the seat in 1935 without success.

Earlier in 1931, Oldfield had been elected to the London County Council to represent Whitechapel and St George's. He remained a member of the council until 1958, later representing Stepney and was vice chairman in 1954–1955.

With the outbreak of World War II in 1939, Oldfield attempted to rejoin the armed forces, but was initially rejected due to his age. He eventually succeeded in enlisting as an able seaman in the Royal Navy. He finished the war with the rank of sub-lieutenant.

In 1953, he married Jonnet Elizabeth Richards, and the couple moved to Doddington, Kent. There he created a mushroom farm while his wife worked on the gardens of Doddington Place. In 1964, he joined the Conservative Party and was elected to Kent County Council in the following year. He remained on the council until 1981, representing Swale West ward.

He died in Doddington aged 100 in December 1999, 68 years after leaving the House of Commons. He was the last surviving MP to have served during the reign of George V (1910–1936).

== See also ==
- Records of members of parliament of the United Kingdom

Parliament of the United Kingdom
| Preceded by Herbert Looker | Member of Parliament for South East Essex; 1929–1931 | Succeeded by Victor Raikes |
