= South East Essex =

- Proposed unitary authority area
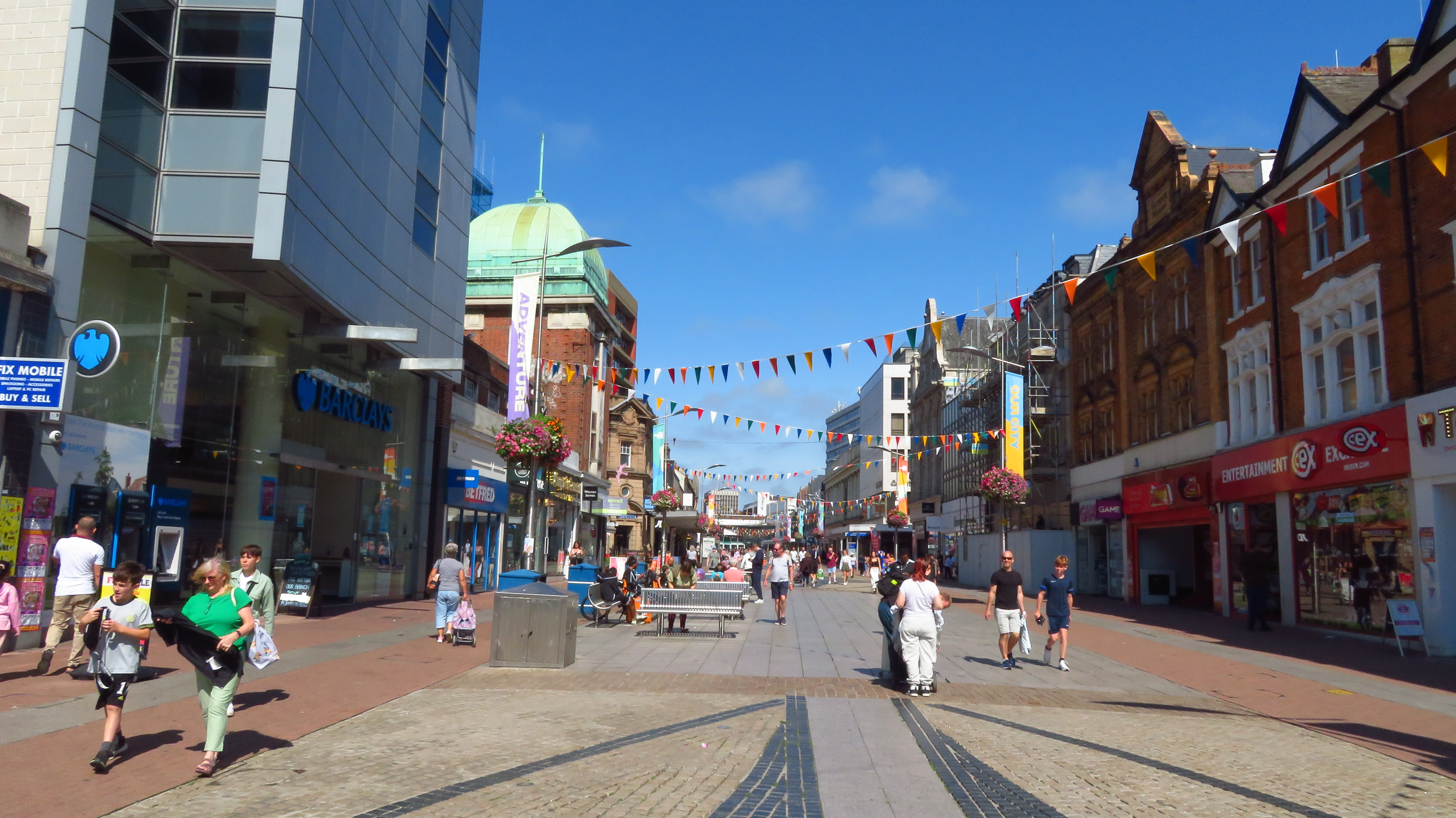
- Southend-on-Sea

- South East Essex shown within Essex
- Interactive map of South East Essex
- Coordinates: 51.65°N 0.71°E
- Sovereign state: United Kingdom
- Country: England
- Region: East
- Ceremonial county: Essex

Government
  - Type: Unitary authority
  - Body: South East Essex Council

Area
  - Total: 97.85 sq mi (253.44 km^{2})

Population (2024 estimate)
  - Total: 365,652
  - Density: 3,736.7/sq mi (1,442.8/km^{2})
- Time zone: UTC+0 (GMT)
  - Summer (DST): UTC+1 (BST)

South East Essex was a proposed unitary authority area in Essex, England. As part of an ongoing local government reorganisation, it would have been formed from the existing districts of Castle Point, Rochford and Southend-on-Sea. The first councillors to South East Essex Council would have been elected in May 2027. The largest settlement in the district would have been the city of Southend-on-Sea. Plans to create it were withdrawn in September 2026.

== History ==
In February 2025, Essex was accepted into the Devolution Priority Programme. Tied to this, councils were invited to submit proposals for the reorganisation of local government districts by September 2025. The government held statutory consultations from November 2025 to January 2026 and made a decision in March 2026. In South East Essex, it was decided to create a new unitary authority district by combining Castle Point, Rochford and Southend-on-Sea.

In September 2026, the Essex proposals were withdrawn by the government in light of new legal advice. In September 2026, the Essex proposals were withdrawn by the government in light of new legal advice. The decision was threatened with judicial review by Essex County Council.

== Geography ==
The largest settlement in the district would have been Southend-on-Sea. The Office for National Statistics mid-2023 population estimate of the district was 360,317.

=== Parishes ===
Much of the proposed district, including Benfleet and Southend, is unparished. Southend has city status and its council planned to establish charter trustees for the unparished area to maintain this and the mayoralty.

The rest of the area is made of civil parishes:

- Ashingdon
- Barling Magna
- Canewdon, Canvey Island
- Foulness
- Great Wakering
- Hawkwell, Hockley, Hullbridge
- Leigh-on-Sea
- Paglesham
- Rawreth, Rayleigh, Rochford
- Stambridge, Sutton

== Governance ==
The local authority would have been South East Essex Council. The first councillors would been elected in May 2027. This election was cancelled in September 2026.
