= Alexander Wood (physicist) =

Scottish physicist (1879–1950)

Alexander Wood (3 May 1879 – 1 April 1950) was a Scottish physicist who worked as researcher and university lecturer in the field of acoustics and experimental physics.

== Biography ==
Son of Sir Alexander Wood of Partick, he was born in Scotland and educated at Glasgow University and obtained a doctorate in 1907. That very year he went to Emmanuel College, Cambridge, where he became a fellow and tutor.

At the fiftieth anniversary of the discovery of the electron, Wood lectured on the work and history of the Cavendish Laboratory of which he was a well-known and active member. Future Nobelist George Paget Thomson, who attended Wood's lectures of physics, would comment later: "these were outstanding both in material and exposition, and impressed me greatly." Similarly, Alan Lindsay Mackay, who was Wood's student, mentioned him as one of his great professors and someone whose lectures were full of demonstrations. In addition, scientist Charles Alfred Coulson spoke of Alex as one of his three major influences, and Lawrence Bragg corresponded with him asking for help in his research.

As a pupil of Lord Kelvin (William Thomson) at the University of Glasgow, Wood acquired some of his religious practices as the habit of praying before lecturing. He was a devout Christian and active member of the Church of Scotland in Cambridge, worshiping regularly at St Columba's Church in Downing Street and held Bible lessons and spoke about the relation between science and religion.

In addition, along with Kees Boeke and Herbert Gray, during the World War I he was a member of the Fellowship of Reconciliation, a group of religious pacifists.; at the time of conscription he was a conscientious objector. He was a leading member of the Peace Pledge Union, serving as Chair, 1940–46, and was also active in the National Peace Council. After his death, theologian Charles E. Raven wrote a biography of the physicist entitled Alex Wood: the man and his message (1952).

In the 1929 general election Wood stood as the Labour Party candidate for the two-member Cambridge University constituency, coming bottom of the poll with 1,463 votes (9.1%) at the first count. He then stood on three occasions as a Labour candidate for the Cambridge seat: in the 1931 and 1935 general elections, and at the intervening by-election in February 1934. The headquarters of Cambridge Constituency Labour Party in Norfolk Street are named after him as is Alex Wood Road in Arbury and the Alex Wood Care Home in Fortescue Road.

== Works ==
- The physical basis of music; Cambridge University press; (Originally published in 1913, though there were further editions in 1945, 1954 and 1975)
- Joule and the study of energy (1925); G. Bell and Sons Ltd.
- In pursuit of truth. A comparative study in science and religion (1927)
- Sound waves and their uses (1930).
  - Also published as Sound waves and their uses; six lectures delivered before a "juvenile auditory" under the auspices of the Royal institution, Christmas, 1928 (1931).
- Planning for good acoustics (1931); coauthored with Hope Bagenal
- The Cavendish Laboratory (1931); 1946
- Science Wisdom and War: Through the Ages Science Has Given Destructive Intentions to War (1934)
- Acoustics (1940)
- The Physics of Music (1944)
- Atomic Energy: Notes on the Course of Negotiations for Its Control (1950)

Posthumous

- Thomas Young: Natural Philosopher 1773-1829 (1954; 2011)

== Bibliography ==
- Jeans, Sir James Hopwood. 1928. The Physics of the Universe, Volume 165. R. & R. Clark, limited,
- Navarro, Jaurme. 2012. A History of the Electron: J. J. and G. P. Thomson. Cambridge University Press.
- Rupke, Nicolaas A. 2009. Eminent Lives in Twentieth-century Science & Religion. Peter Lang
- Wood, Alexander. 2011. Thomas Young: Natural Philosopher 1773-1829. Cambridge University Press.
