= Thomas Jolliffe Tufnell =

English surgeon

- Born: 23 May 1819
- Died: 27 November 1885 (aged 67)
- Occupation: Surgeon

Thomas Jolliffe Tufnell (23 May 1819 – 27 November 1885) was an English surgeon.

== Biography ==
Tufnell was the fifth son of John Charles Tufnell, lieutenant-colonel of the Middlesex militia, by his wife Uliana Ivaniona, only daughter of John Fowell, rector of Bishopsbourne, Kent. He was born at Lackham House, near Chippenham, Wiltshire, on 23 May 1819. He was educated at Dr. Radcliffe's school at Salisbury, and was apprenticed in 1836 to Samuel Luscombe of Exeter, then senior surgeon to the Devon and Exeter Hospital.

Tufnell proceeded to London after studying at Exeter for three years, and entered at St. George's Hospital under Sir Benjamin Collins Brodie and Cæsar Hawkins. He was admitted a member of the College of Surgeons of England in May 1841, and on 11 June in the same year he entered the army as assistant surgeon to the 44th regiment, then serving in India. He proceeded to Calcutta, and took medical charge of all the troops as they arrived from England, remaining for this purpose at Chinsurah until the last detachment had landed at Christmas. By this delay he was hindered from participating in the disastrous campaign in Afghanistan in 1842, in which the 44th regiment was almost annihilated. He returned to England in October, and was posted to the 3rd dragoon guards, with whom he served at Dundalk, Dublin, and Cork.

In 1844 he was married, and determined to leave the service and settle in private practice. On 14 April 1846 he accordingly obtained his transfer to the army medical staff at Dublin, and shortly afterwards accepted as a life appointment the post of surgeon to the Dublin district military prison. He was admitted in 1845 the first fellow by examination of the Royal College of Surgeons of Ireland, and in 1846 he fitted up a classroom and lectured on military hygiene. He also lectured upon this subject at the St. Vincent and Bagot Street hospitals until his appointment as Regius professor of military surgery in the College of Surgeons in 1851. He lectured in this capacity until 1860, when the chair was abolished by the government as a result of the foundation of the Netley military school.

Tufnell again saw service; for in the war between Russia and Turkey, after passing down the Danube in 1854, he went to the Crimea with a Scottish regiment. He acted as an examiner in surgery at the Royal College of Surgeons in Ireland, but he resigned the post on becoming a candidate for the office of vice-president in 1873. He served the college as president in 1874–5, and he was for more than twenty years surgeon to the City of Dublin Hospital. He died on 27 November 1885, and is buried in Mount Jerome cemetery, near Dublin.

In 1844 he was married to Henrietta, daughter of Croasdaile Molony of Granahan, and widow of Robert Fannin. By her he left two daughters: Iva, married to Peter Leslie Peacocke; and Florence, married to Thomas Turbitt of Owenston.

== Works ==
- "Practical Remarks on the Treatment of Aneurism", Dublin, 1851, 8vo.
- "The Successful Treatment of Internal Aneurism", London, 1864, 8vo; 2nd edit. 1875.
