= Edward Carleton Tufnell =

English civil servant and educationist (1806–1886)

Edward Carleton Tufnell (27 October 1806, Marylebone, London (then part of Middlesex) – 3 July 1886 Belgravia, London ) was an English civil servant and educationist.

== Education ==
He was educated at Eton College and Balliol College, Oxford, gaining a first class in mathematics.

== Career ==
He became a commissioner for the Royal Commission on the Poor Laws in 1832. From 1835 to 1846 he was an assistant commissioner to administer the poor law, the new Poor Law having been passed in 1834. Together with James Kay-Shuttleworth, whom he had met as secretary of the Statistical Society of London (founded 1834), in 1839 they jointly published reports on the training of pauper children. In 1840 the Battersea Normal College for the training of teachers of pauper children was founded. This became the College of St Mark and St John at Chelsea, London and is now Plymouth Marjon University (also known as 'Marjon'). This was the first training college for school teachers in the United Kingdom. Today's system of national school education, with public inspection, trained teachers and its support by state as well as local funds, is largely due to their initiative.

== Personal life ==
He was the younger son of William Tufnell (1769–1809) and his wife, Mary (d. 1829), the daughter of Thomas Carleton. His father was a barrister and Whig MP for Colchester 1806–7, and lord of the manor of Barnsbury, London of which he was a developer after whom Tufnell Park was named.

In 1846 Tufnell married Honoria Mary (1824–1877), the only daughter of Colonel William Macadam. They had three sons, including Edward Tufnell (1848–1909), Member of Parliament (father of Richard Tufnell, also a Member of Parliament) and a daughter Mary.
