= Edward Tufnell (politician) =

British politician

Edward Tufnell (13 June 1848 – 15 August 1909) was a British Army officer and Conservative Party politician.

Son of the civil servant and educationalist Edward Carleton Tufnell, Tufnell was educated at Eton. He then joined the British Army in 1867 as an ensign in the 39th (Dorsetshire) Regiment of Foot before exchanging to the 18th (The Royal Irish) Regiment of Foot in 1870. He served in India during Second Anglo-Afghan War and on the Nile Expedition. He retired from the Army in 1889 and joined the Honourable Corps of Gentlemen at Arms in 1894.

He was elected to the House of Commons for South East Essex as a Conservative in 1900, holding the seat until 1906. He was also a justice of the peace for Sussex.

He was twice married; firstly to Catherine McMicking, and secondly to Ellen Bertha Gubbins, sister of John Gaspard Gubbins and granddaughter of John Etherington Welch Rolls.

His son, Richard Tufnell, was Member of Parliament for Cambridge.
