= Southend by-election =

Southend by-election may refer to several by-elections in the town of Southend, England:

- 1927 Southend by-election, after Rupert Guinness was elevated to the Lords (won by Gwendolen Guinness)
- 1959 Southend West by-election, after the death of Henry Channon (won by Paul Channon)
- 1980 Southend East by-election, after the death of Stephen McAdden (won by Teddy Taylor)
- 2019 Milton by-election, in Southend council's Milton ward, after the death of Julian Ware-Lane
- 2022 Southend West by-election, after the killing of David Amess
