= Kelvedon Hall =

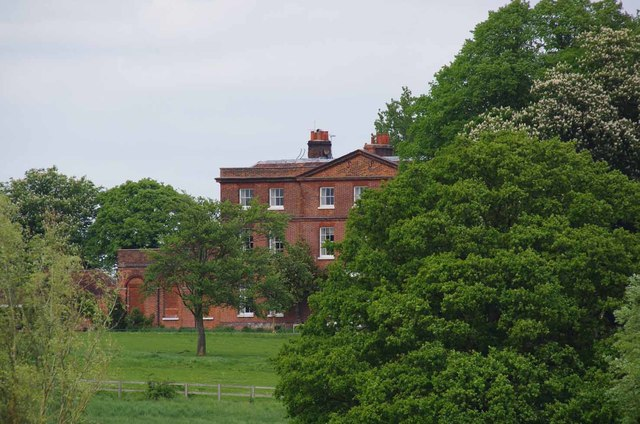
- "The place is a dream of quiet well-bred tranquillity" - Chips Channon's diary entry for 30 April 1937, made just prior to his buying the house

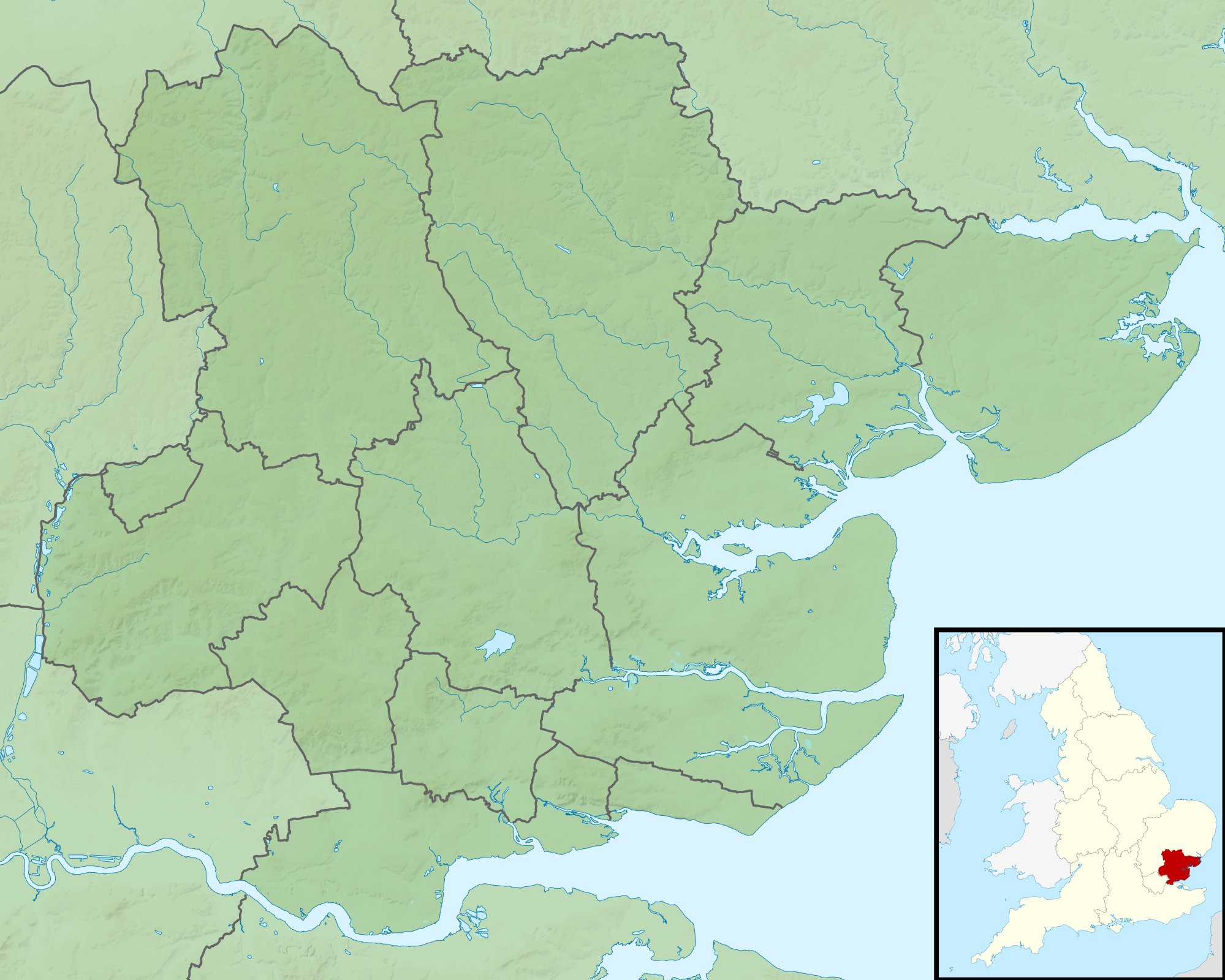
- Location within Essex
- 51.6774°N 0.2527°E
- Type: House
- Location: Kelvedon Hatch, Essex

History
- Built: 1743, restorations in late 18th and early 20th centuries

Site notes
- Architect(s): Gerald Wellesley, 20th century restoration
- Governing body: Privately owned

Listed Building – Grade I
- Official name: Kelvedon Hall
- Designated: 27 August 1952
- Reference no.: 1279546

Listed Building – Grade II
- Official name: Lodge to Kelvedon Hall
- Designated: 27 August 1952
- Reference no.: 1297203

Listed Building – Grade II
- Official name: Orangery and Garden Wall at Kelvedon Hall
- Designated: 20 February 1967
- Reference no.: 1207892

Listed Building – Grade II
- Official name: Stable Block North West of Kelvedon Hall
- Designated: 20 February 1967
- Reference no.: 1207896

Kelvedon Hall is a country house in the village of Kelvedon Hatch, near Brentwood, Essex, England. Originally the site of an important medieval manor, the current house was built in the mid-18th century by a family of Catholic landowners, the Wrights, who had bought the manor in 1538. The last of the Wrights to live at the house died in 1838 and it was then let, before being sold to a school. In 1937 the hall was bought by Henry “Chips” Channon, a wealthy Anglophile socialite. Kelvedon appears repeatedly in Channon's diaries, an intimate record of his social and political life from the 1920s to the 1950s. The hall remains the private home of the Channon family. It is a Grade I listed building.

== History ==
In the Medieval period, the parish of Kelvedon Hatch comprised three manors of which that centred on Kelvedon Hall was the most important. The manor was held by the Wright family from 1538, but their adherence to Catholicism limited their influence. The present hall was built in 1743 for John Wright, replacing the original manor house. The last Wright owner who lived at the hall was Joseph Wright who died in 1868. The estate was then let to a succession of tenants until it was sold to St Michael's Roman Catholic School in the early 1930s. The school was unsuccessful and the order of nuns in charge converted the hall to an asylum. This was equally unsuccessful, and in the spring of 1937, the house was again put up for sale. (Note: Channon records a number of patient deaths at the asylum in the last years of the nuns' tenure.) In May 1937, the hall was purchased by Henry "Chips" Channon.

=== Henry Channon ===
Henry Channon, generally known as "Chips", was an American-born anglophile who took up residence in England in 1918. Possessed of a substantial inherited fortune of his own, Channon became richer still when he married an heiress, Honor Guinness, daughter of Rupert Guinness, 2nd Earl of Iveagh in 1933. In 1935 he was elected Member of Parliament for the Essex constituency of Southend, a seat previously held by both his father-in-law and his mother-in-law.

Channon's political life, in which he never rose above the rank of Parliamentary Private Secretary, was always an adjunct to his social life, at which he excelled. His diaries record his friendships, and affairs, with many of the royals, aristocrats and the merely wealthy who populated the London social scene in the decades prior to and following World War II and are filled with "accounts of London dinners, luncheons or balls, or long country-house weekend parties". (Note: An expurgated and abridged version of Channon’s diaries, based on transcripts prepared by Channon’s lover, Peter Coats, was edited and published by Robert Rhodes James in 1967. The first two volumes of a fuller, uncensored, version, edited by Simon Heffer, were published in 2021, with the third and final volume in September 2022)

Channon's election as the MP for Southend led to a desire for a country house close to the constituency. Having viewed, and rejected, Bradwell Lodge near Maldon, (Note: Bradwell Lodge subsequently became the home of Tom Driberg, the Labour Party politician.) Channon and his wife settled on Kelvedon, buying it in May 1937. Channon became very attached to the house, his diary entries frequently referring to its dream-like qualities; "Kelvedon is looking a dream of vernal lush beauty". He immediately engaged his friend, Gerald Wellesley, an architect and heir to the Dukedom of Wellington, to undertake renovations. Wellesley, working with his partner Trenwith Wells, made alterations to the house and improvements to the grounds. (Note: Again working with Trenwith Wills, Wellesley also undertook the remodelling of 5 Belgrave Square, Channon's London home.)

On Channon's death in 1958, the hall passed to his son Paul (he became Baron Kelvedon in 1997). It remains a private residence, and was occupied by Henry Channon, Chips's grandson, until his death in October 2021. It is not open to the public.

== Architecture and description ==
Kelvedon is built to a U-plan, with a three-storey, seven-bay central block linked to two-storey pavilions at either side. The construction material is red brick. In addition to renovating the house, Channon commissioned enhancements to the setting of the house and to the wider estate. Wellesley and Wells built a double entrance lodge, the lodges connected by an archway, while a swimming pool and bathing house were designed by William Kellner. (Note: Channon's diary makes reference to "the Austrian Kellner" of Jermyn Street. In an article for Country Life, Christopher Woodward identifies him as the art director William Kellner, who later achieved success in films such as Powell and Pressburger's A Matter of Life and Death, and Mankiewicz's Suddenly, Last Summer.) James Bettley, in his Essex volume of the Pevsner Buildings of England series, describes the unusual style of this pool pavilion as "Neo-Austrian-Baroque". (Note: Channon, who took a keen interest in the interior design of his homes, had a particular liking for the highly decorative. His celebrated dining room at Belgrave Square was designed by Stéphane Boudin and modelled on the Hall of Mirrors in the Amalienburg lodge in Munich. Harold Nicolson recorded his impressions in his diary after dining there in February 1936: "Oh my god, how rich and powerful Lord Channon has become. The house is all Regency upstairs then the dining room - baroque and rococo and what-ho and oh-no-no. Very fine indeed".)

Internally, Bettley notes some good interiors in an Adamesque style from the 1780s, a ceiling mural by John Churchill dating from Channon's ownership, and redecoration carried out in the mid-1960s by David Hicks for Channon's son. Kelvedon Hall is a Grade I listed building. The lodges, the orangery and an attached wall, and the stable block are all listed Grade II.

== Sources ==
- Bettley, James; Pevsner, Nikolaus (2007). Essex. The Buildings of England. New Haven, US and London: Yale University Press. ISBN 978-0-300-11614-4. OCLC 1042848015.
- Channon, Henry (2021). Simon Heffer (ed.). Henry "Chips" Channon - The Diaries: 1918-1938. London: Hutchinson. ISBN 978-1-786-33181-6. OCLC 1130667674.
- Channon, Henry (2021). Simon Heffer (ed.). Henry "Chips" Channon - The Diaries: 1938-1943. London: Hutchinson. ISBN 978-1-786-33182-3. OCLC 1259535451.
- Channon, Henry (1967). Robert Rhodes James (ed.). "Chips" - The Diaries of Sir Henry Channon. London: Weidenfeld & Nicolson. OCLC 530332018.
- Nicolson, Harold (1966). Nigel Nicolson (ed.). Diaries and Letters: 1930–1939. London: William Collins, Sons. OCLC 874514916.
