= Gurth Hoyer-Millar =

Scotland international rugby union player & cricketer

- Born: Gurth Christian Hoyer-Millar; 13 December 1929 Chelsea, London, England
- Died: 6 March 2014 (aged 84)
- School: Harrow
- University: Lincoln College, Oxford

Rugby union career
- Position: Hooker
International career
Years	Team	Apps	(Points)
1953	Scotland	1	(0)

Gurth Christian Hoyer-Millar (13 December 1929 – 6 March 2014) was a Scottish sportsman who played international rugby union for Scotland. He also played first-class cricket with the Oxford University Cricket Club.

Hoyer-Millar spent his early sporting years at Harrow School, where he captained their cricket team in both 1947 and 1948. He was awarded rugby union and boxing blues at Oxford University and also kept wicket for the university in two first-class matches in 1952, against Kent and Warwickshire.

He was capped just once for the Scotland national rugby union team. His only Test came against Ireland at Murrayfield in the 1953 Five Nations Championship.

Though he was called to the bar by Middle Temple, Hoyer-Millar did not practice as a lawyer, instead working for BP and J Sainsbury, where he was the first chairman of the Homebase DIY chain. He was chairman of Bonhams auctioneers from 1988 to 1996 and served as a non-executive director of the Hudson's Bay Company.

In 1956 he was a Liberal candidate for Earl's Court ward in the Kensington Metropolitan Borough Council elections.

He stood as a Liberal candidate in Kensington South in 1959. He stood for Southend West against Conservative incumbent Paul Channon twice, in 1964 and 1966 On the first occasion he finished ahead of Labour candidate and newspaper/broadcast journalist Rex Winsbury. He was also an unsuccessful candidate at Aberdeenshire East in 1970 and Eastbourne in October 1974
