= Kelvedon Hatch =

Village in Essex, England

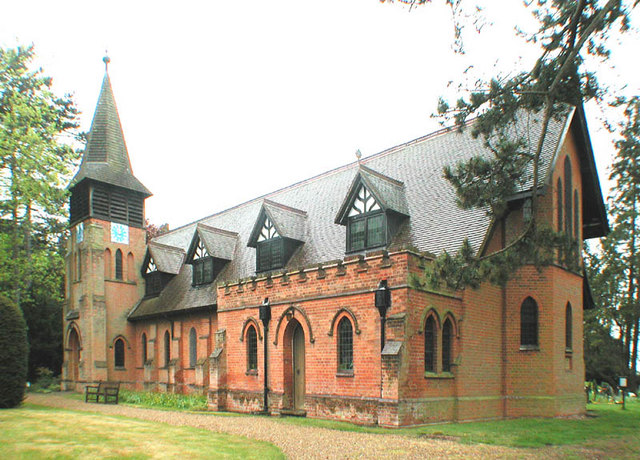
- St Nicholas, Kelvedon Hatch

- Location within Essex
- Area: 0.647 km^{2} (0.250 sq mi)
- Population: 2,636 (Parish, 2021); 2,398 (Built up area, 2021)
  - Density: 4,074/km^{2} (10,550/sq mi)
- OS grid reference: TQ576986
- Civil parish: Kelvedon Hatch
- District: Brentwood
- Shire county: Essex
- Region: East
- Country: England
- Sovereign state: United Kingdom
- Post town: BRENTWOOD
- Postcode district: CM15
- Dialling code: 01277
- Police: Essex
- Fire: Essex
- Ambulance: East of England
- UK Parliament: Brentwood and Ongar

Kelvedon Hatch is a village and civil parish in the Borough of Brentwood in south Essex, England. It is situated just north of Pilgrims Hatch, approximately 4 miles (6 km) to the north of Brentwood and is surrounded by Metropolitan Green Belt. At the 2021 census the parish had a population of 2,636 and the built up area had a population of 2,398.

It is home to the Kelvedon Hatch Secret Nuclear Bunker, the largest and deepest Cold War bunker open to the public in South East England. The Coppice, Kelvedon Hatch, is a biological Site of Special Scientific Interest.

== History ==
The name is recorded variously as Kelenduna, Kalenduna and Kelvenduna in the Domesday Book with the latter meaning Speckled Hill. From its early days in the Mediaeval period until the mid-20th century the main activity in Kelvedon Hatch was agriculture. Records from 1871 show 82 households, of which showed only 3 'white collar' households and 4 landowners or of independent means, with the majority of the rest engaged in a local agricultural economy. During the Victorian years, however, many younger people gravitated towards the main towns, encouraged by railway links at Ongar and Brentwood and the decline in the local 'agriconomy' has its roots in that exodus.

=== Kelvedon Hall and other mansions ===
First mentioned in the Domesday Book, the main estate building of the village was Kelvedon Hall. The manor was sold to John Wright, a yeoman from South Weald, in 1538 and it remained in the family until the early 20th century; the manor house was rebuilt in the 18th century by the seventh John Wright. In 1937 the property was bought by Sir Henry 'Chips' and Lady Honor Channon who restored the house and built the entrance gateway and lodges. In World War II it was used as a Red Cross convalescent home.

Other mansions in the area of Kelvedon Hatch are Brizes, originally built in the late 15th century with the current building on the site dating back to the 1720s; and Great Myles, named for Miles de Muntenay, dating back to the Domesday Book but was largely demolished in 1837 although a few subsidiary buildings remain today.

To the west of Kelvedon Hatch in Navestock Parish lies Dudbrook Hall, once owned by the Waldegrave family and which dates back to 1602. During World War II it was used to billet RAF officers based at Stapleford and Weald aerodromes. It is now a care home for the elderly. 51.663547°N 0.248603°E

The medieval parish church of St Nicholas was replaced by a Victorian one in 1895.

== Notable people ==
- Sarah Kane, playwright, referred to the village in the pseudonym "Marie Kelvedon", under which her fourth play, Crave, was initially published.
- Sir Henry Channon, often known as Chips Channon, American-born Conservative politician, author and diarist.
- Baron Kelvedon, PC.
