= Southend West by-election =

Southend West by-election may refer to:

- 1959 Southend West by-election, after the death of Henry Channon (won by Paul Channon)
- 2022 Southend West by-election, after the killing of David Amess
