= St Nicholas Church, Kelvedon Hatch =

Church in Kelvedon Hatch, Essex, England

Coordinates: 51°40′03″N 0°16′02″E

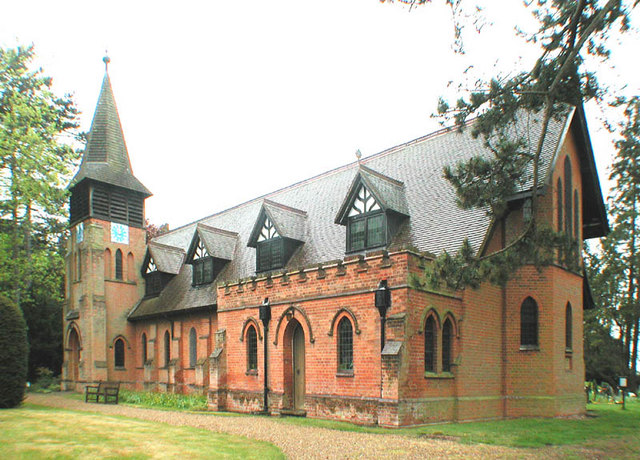
St Nicholas Church – the 1895 structure.

St Nicholas Church is the Church of England parish church in the Essex village of Kelvedon Hatch. It was first recorded around 1254, when the rectory of the church of (Magdalen) Lever was valued at 6 marks, rising to 10 marks in 1291 and £12 in 1535.

The original medieval parish church was fully rebuilt in the early 1750s, retaining a 15th-century bell and the octagonal font, which probably also dates to the 15th century. £380 was spent restoring it in 1873; but by 1893 the main population centre of the village had shifted elsewhere, and it was decided to build a new church nearer to that centre. Costing £2000, designed by the local architect John Thomas Newman and using a site originally intended as a new village cemetery, the new redbrick church was consecrated in 1895 and included many fittings from the medieval and Georgian building, including the font, the 1460–1480 bell and the 19th-century seating. It was restored in 1927 and is a Grade II listed building.

The old church was allowed to fall into disrepair and also damaged by a vengeance weapon in 1945. Some medieval floor slabs and 16th-to-18th-century wall monuments survived in the old church until at least 1956, including some for the Wrights of Kelvedon Hall, on whose estate it stood, and the Luther family of Moyses's, who probably gave the church its 1674 silver cup and paten, which bear their family coat of arms.
