= Southend West and Leigh =

Parliamentary constituency in the United Kingdom, 1950 onwards

Coordinates: 51.55°N 0.66°E

- Borough constituency for the House of Commons
- Interactive map of boundaries since 2024
- Location within the East of England
- County: Essex
- Electorate: 76,824 (March 2020)
- Major settlements: Southend-on-Sea, Leigh-on-Sea, Westcliff-on-Sea

Current constituency
- Created: 1950
- Member of Parliament: David Burton-Sampson (Labour)
- Seats: One
- Created from: Southend

Southend West and Leigh is a constituency (Note: A borough constituency (for the purposes of election expenses and type of returning officer)) in the House of Commons of the UK Parliament. In the 2024 general election the seat was won by David Burton-Sampson for Labour. It was previously held by Anna Firth who won the 2022 by-election, following the murder of the incumbent MP, David Amess. (Note: As with all constituencies, the constituency elects one Member of Parliament (MP) by the first past the post system of election at least every five years.)

Although the constituency had always, since its creation in 1950, contained the town of Leigh-on-Sea, it was formally known as Southend West up until the 2024 general election. Further to the 2023 review of Westminster constituencies, the Boundary Commission for England recommended that it be renamed Southend West and Leigh.

== Constituency profile ==
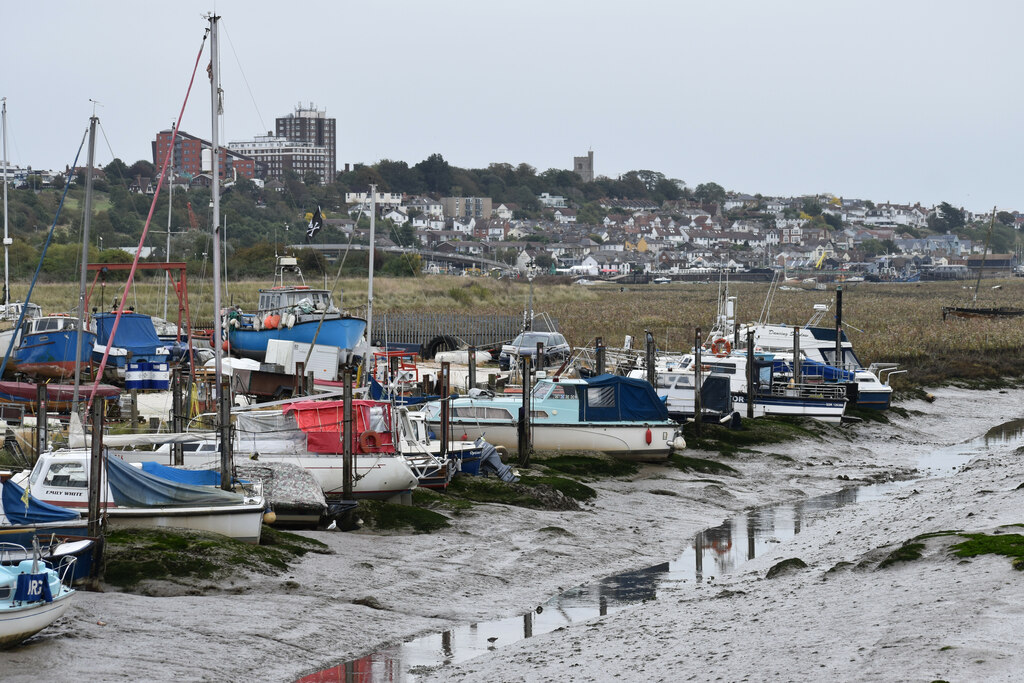
Leigh-on-Sea

Southend West and Leigh is a constituency in Essex in the East of England. It covers the northern and western suburbs of the city of Southend-on-Sea, including Leigh-on-Sea, Chalkwell, Westcliff-on-Sea, Prittlewell and Eastwood.

Southend is a seaside resort city. It was a small fishing village until the early 19th century when it was developed for tourism. Leigh was traditionally a separate coastal town but has been absorbed by the Southend's suburban expansion. There is some deprivation in the areas close to the city centre, however this part of Southend largely avoided the economic problems caused by the late-20th-century decline in domestic tourism. Most of the neighbourhoods in this constituency are affluent and suburban in character, especially in Leigh, which was named the happiest place to live in Britain by Rightmove in 2018. House prices across the constituency are generally similar to the rest of the East of England and higher than the UK average.

Residents of Southend West and Leigh are older than average with a low proportion of young adults. They have average rates of income, high levels of homeownership, and the child poverty rate is low. Residents generally have below-average levels of education and a high proportion work in the health and education sectors. The percentage claiming unemployment benefits is low. White people made up 89% of the population at the 2021 census.

This constituency is politically mixed at the local city council; Leigh is represented by Green Party councillors, the city centre neighbourhoods like Prittlewell and Westborough by the Labour Party and Reform UK, and the outer suburbs like Eastwood by Conservatives and Liberal Democrats. An estimated 57% of voters in Southend West and Leigh supported leaving the European Union in the 2016 referendum, higher than the UK-wide figure of 52%.

== History ==
The constituency was created for the 1950 general election under the Representation of the People Act 1948, when the Parliamentary Borough of Southend-on-Sea was split in two.

Because four members of the Guinness family have held the seat (or its predecessor, Southend) it has been dubbed in political analyses in the media as "Guinness-on-Sea".

The seat had historically been seen by pundits as a safe Conservative seat and from its creation until 2019, the seat was held by the Conservative Party, with majorities ranging from 5.7% during the Labour Landslide of 1997 to 43.4% in 1955.

The seat was represented by David Amess for 24 years, from 1997 to 15 October 2021, when he was murdered. Amess was previously the MP for Basildon from 1983. A by-election was held to elect a replacement MP. In a similar vein to the subsequent by-election following the murder of Labour MP Jo Cox in 2016, all major contender parties stated they would not field candidates in opposition to the successful Conservative candidate, Anna Firth.

At the 2024 general election it was won by Labour for the first time with a 35.6% share.

== Boundaries and boundary changes ==
=== Historic (Southend West) ===
==== 1950–1955 ====
- The County Borough of Southend-on-Sea wards of Chalkwell, Eastwood, Leigh, Milton, Prittlewell, St Clements, Victoria, and Westborough.

Formed primarily from western parts of the abolished Parliamentary Borough of Southend-on-Sea.

==== 1955–1983 ====
- The County Borough of Southend-on-Sea wards of Blenheim, Chalkwell, Eastwood, Leigh, Prittlewell, St Clement's, Southbourne, and Westborough.

Realignment of boundary with Southend East.

==== 1983–2010 ====
- The Borough of Southend-on-Sea wards of Belfairs, Blenheim, Chalkwell, Eastwood, Leigh, Prittlewell, and Westborough.

Marginal changes following the redistribution of wards in the Borough of Southend-on-Sea.

==== 2010–2024 ====
Map of boundaries 2010–2024

- The Borough of Southend-on-Sea wards of Belfairs, Blenheim Park, Chalkwell, Eastwood Park, Leigh, Prittlewell, St Laurence, Westborough, and West Leigh.

Further marginal changes were due to a redistribution of local authority wards.

=== Current (Southend West and Leigh) ===
Further to the 2023 review of Westminster constituencies, which came into effect for the 2024 general election, the constituency comprises the whole of the previous Southend West seat with the addition of St Luke's ward from Rochford and Southend East.

The constituency comprises a small part of the west of Southend-on-Sea, and includes Leigh-on-Sea and Westcliff-on-Sea. It is bounded to the north and east by Rochford and Southend East, to the north by Rayleigh and Wickford, to the west by Castle Point, and to the south by the very end of the Thames Estuary.

== Members of Parliament ==
Southend prior to 1950

Election	Member	Party
1950	Sir Henry Channon	Conservative
1959 by-election	Paul Channon	Conservative
1997	Sir David Amess	Conservative
2022 by-election	Anna Firth	Conservative
2024	David Burton-Sampson	Labour

== Elections ==
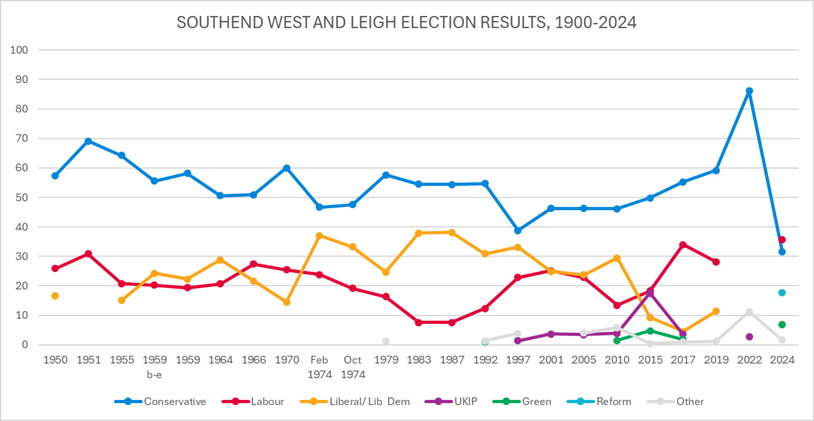
Election results 1950–2024

=== Elections in the 2020s ===
General election 2024: Southend West and Leigh
Party	Candidate	Votes	%	±%
Labour	David Burton-Sampson	16,739	35.6	+6.6
Conservative	Anna Firth	14,790	31.5	−27.6
Reform	Peter Little	8,273	17.6	N/A
Green	Tilly Hogrebe	3,262	6.9	N/A
Liberal Democrats	Stephen Cummins	3,174	6.8	−3.8
Confelicity	James Miller	262	0.6	N/A
Independent	Tom Darwood	172	0.4	N/A
Heritage	Lara Hurley	99	0.2	N/A
Psychedelic Movement	Jason Pilley	99	0.2	N/A
Independent	Robert Francis	98	0.2	N/A
Majority		1,949	4.1	N/A
Turnout		46,968	62.5	−4.4
Registered electors		75,154		
Labour gain from Conservative		Swing	+17.1	

Vote share changes for the 2024 election are compared to the notional results from the 2019 election, not the 2022 by-election.

2022 Southend West by-election
Party	Candidate	Votes	%	±%
Conservative	Anna Firth	12,792	86.1	+26.9
Psychedelic Movement	Jason Pilley	512	3.4	N/A
UKIP	Steve Laws	400	2.7	N/A
English Democrat	Catherine Blaiklock	320	2.2	N/A
Independent	Jayda Fransen	299	2.0	N/A
Heritage	Ben Downton	236	1.6	N/A
Freedom Alliance	Christopher Anderson	161	1.1	N/A
English Constitution Party	Graham Moore	86	0.6	N/A
No description	Olga Childs	52	0.3	N/A
Rejected ballots		1,084		
Majority		12,280	82.7	+51.6
Turnout		15,942	24.0	−43.4
Registered electors		66,354		
Conservative hold		Swing		

=== Elections in the 2010s ===
2019 notional result
Party	Vote	%
Conservative	30,367	59.1
Labour	14,913	29.0
Liberal Democrats	5,449	10.6
Others	692	1.3
Turnout	51,421	66.9
Electorate	76,824	

General election 2019: Southend West
Party	Candidate	Votes	%	±%
Conservative	David Amess	27,555	59.2	+4.0
Labour	Aston Line	13,096	28.1	−5.9
Liberal Democrats	Nina Stimson	5,312	11.4	+6.9
Independent	77 Joseph	574	1.2	N/A
Majority		14,459	31.1	+9.9
Turnout		46,537	67.4	−2.3
Conservative hold		Swing	+4.9	

General election 2017: Southend West
Party	Candidate	Votes	%	±%
Conservative	David Amess	26,046	55.2	+5.4
Labour	Julian Ware-Lane	16,046	34.0	+15.7
Liberal Democrats	Lucy Salek	2,110	4.5	−4.8
UKIP	John Stansfield	1,666	3.5	−14.0
Green	Dominic Ellis	831	1.8	−2.9
Southend Independent Association	Tino Callaghan	305	0.6	N/A
Independent	Jason Pilley	187	0.4	N/A
Majority		10,000	21.2	−10.3
Turnout		47,191	69.7	+3.1
Conservative hold		Swing	−5.2	

Jack Monroe had previously been standing for the National Health Action Party, before withdrawing their candidacy on 11 May 2017, citing death threats and concern for their health.

General election 2015: Southend West
Party	Candidate	Votes	%	±%
Conservative	David Amess	22,175	49.8	+3.8
Labour	Julian Ware-Lane	8,154	18.3	+4.9
UKIP	Brian Otridge	7,803	17.5	+13.6
Liberal Democrats	Paul Collins	4,129	9.3	−20.1
Green	Jon Fuller	2,083	4.7	+3.2
English Democrat	Jeremy Moss	165	0.4	−0.9
Majority		14,021	31.5	+14.8
Turnout		44,509	66.6	+1.5
Conservative hold		Swing	−0.5	

General election 2010: Southend West
Party	Candidate	Votes	%	±%
Conservative	David Amess	20,086	46.1	−0.1
Liberal Democrats	Peter Welch	12,816	29.4	+5.4
Labour	Thomas Flynn	5,850	13.4	−9.2
UKIP	Garry Cockrill	1,714	3.9	+0.5
BNP	Tony Gladwin	1,333	3.1	N/A
Green	Barry Bolton	644	1.5	N/A
Independent	Vel (Marimutu Velmurgan)	617	1.4	N/A
English Democrat	Terry Phillips	546	1.3	−0.5
Majority		7,270	16.7	−5.8
Turnout		43,606	65.1	+4.0
Conservative hold		Swing	−2.8	

=== Elections in the 2000s ===
General election 2005: Southend West
Party	Candidate	Votes	%	±%
Conservative	David Amess	18,408	46.2	−0.1
Liberal Democrats	Peter Wexham	9,449	23.7	−1.2
Labour	Jan Etienne	9,072	22.8	−2.3
UKIP	Carole Sampson	1,349	3.4	−0.3
Independent	Marimutu Velmurgan	745	1.9	N/A
English Democrat	Jeremy Moss	701	1.8	N/A
Max Power Party	Dan Anslow	106	0.3	N/A
Majority		8,959	22.5	+1.3
Turnout		39,830	61.9	+3.9
Conservative hold		Swing	+0.5	

General election 2001: Southend West
Party	Candidate	Votes	%	±%
Conservative	David Amess	17,313	46.3	+7.5
Labour	Paul Fisher	9,372	25.1	+2.3
Liberal Democrats	Richard de Ste Croix	9,319	24.9	−8.2
UKIP	Brian Lee	1,371	3.7	+2.3
Majority		7,941	21.2	+15.5
Turnout		37,375	58.0	−12.0
Conservative hold		Swing		

=== Elections in the 1990s ===
General election 1997: Southend West
Party	Candidate	Votes	%	±%
Conservative	David Amess	18,029	38.8	−15.9
Liberal Democrats	Nina Stimson	15,414	33.1	+2.2
Labour	Alan Harley	10,600	22.8	+10.5
Referendum	Charles Webster	1,734	3.7	N/A
UKIP	Brian Lee	636	1.4	N/A
Natural Law	Peter Warburton	101	0.2	−0.1
Majority		2,615	5.7	−18.1
Turnout		46,514	70.0	−7.8
Conservative hold		Swing		

General election 1992: Southend West
Party	Candidate	Votes	%	±%
Conservative	Paul Channon	27,319	54.7	+0.3
Liberal Democrats	Nina Stimson	15,417	30.9	−7.2
Labour	Geoffrey Viney	6,139	12.3	+4.7
Liberal	Alan Farmer	495	1.0	N/A
Green	Chris Keene	451	0.9	N/A
Natural Law	Peter Warburton	127	0.3	N/A
Majority		11,902	23.8	+7.5
Turnout		49,948	77.8	+2.5
Conservative hold		Swing	+3.8	

=== Elections in the 1980s ===
General election 1987: Southend West
Party	Candidate	Votes	%	±%
Conservative	Paul Channon	28,003	54.4	−0.1
Liberal	Gavin Grant	19,603	38.1	+0.2
Labour Co-op	Angela Smith	3,899	7.6	±0.0
Majority		8,400	16.3	−0.3
Turnout		51,505	75.3	+3.6
Conservative hold		Swing	−0.1	

General election 1983: Southend West
Party	Candidate	Votes	%	±%
Conservative	Paul Channon	26,360	54.5	−3.2
Liberal	Gavin Grant	18,327	37.9	+13.2
Labour	Joy Nisbet	3,675	7.6	−8.7
Majority		8,033	16.6	−16.4
Turnout		48,362	71.7	−4.6
Conservative hold		Swing	−8.2	

=== Elections in the 1970s ===
General election 1979: Southend West
Party	Candidate	Votes	%	±%
Conservative	Paul Channon	29,449	57.68	
Liberal	D Evans	12,585	24.65	
Labour	J Nisbet	8,341	16.34	
National Front	LJ McKeon	680	1.33	N/A
Majority		16,864	33.03	
Turnout		51,055	76.25	
Conservative hold		Swing		

General election October 1974: Southend West
Party	Candidate	Votes	%	±%
Conservative	Paul Channon	23,480	47.59	
Liberal	W Greaves	16,409	33.26	
Labour	AN Wright	9,451	19.15	
Majority		7,071	14.33	
Turnout		49,340	73.16	
Conservative hold		Swing		

General election February 1974: Southend West
Party	Candidate	Votes	%	±%
Conservative	Paul Channon	25,040	46.68	
Liberal	W Greaves	19,885	37.07	
Labour	AN Wright	14,160	23.85	
Majority		5,155	9.61	
Turnout		59,085	77.23	
Conservative hold		Swing		

General election 1970: Southend West
Party	Candidate	Votes	%	±%
Conservative	Paul Channon	29,304	60.05	
Labour	M Burstin	12,419	25.45	
Liberal	JH Barnett	7,077	14.50	
Majority		16,885	34.60	
Turnout		48,800	70.70	
Conservative hold		Swing		

=== Elections in the 1960s ===
General election 1966: Southend West
Party	Candidate	Votes	%	±%
Conservative	Paul Channon	25,713	50.89	
Labour	M Burstin	13,856	27.42	
Liberal	Gurth Hoyer-Millar	10,958	21.69	
Majority		11,857	23.47	
Turnout		50,527	78.35	
Conservative hold		Swing		

General election 1964: Southend West
Party	Candidate	Votes	%	±%
Conservative	Paul Channon	25,555	50.58	
Liberal	Gurth Hoyer-Millar	14,548	28.79	
Labour	Rex Winsbury	10,423	20.63	
Majority		11,007	21.79	
Turnout		50,526	78.78	
Conservative hold		Swing		

=== Elections in the 1950s ===
General election 1959: Southend West
Party	Candidate	Votes	%	±%
Conservative	Paul Channon	27,612	58.2	−6.0
Liberal	Heather Harvey	10,577	22.3	+7.3
Labour	Anthony Pearson-Clarke	9,219	19.4	−1.4
Majority		17,035	35.9	−7.7
Turnout		47,408	77.7	+3.6
Conservative hold		Swing		

1959 Southend West by-election
Party	Candidate	Votes	%	±%
Conservative	Paul Channon	14,493	55.6	−8.6
Liberal	Heather Harvey	6,314	24.2	+9.2
Labour	Anthony Pearson-Clarke	5,280	20.2	−0.6
Majority		5,166	31.4	−12.0
Turnout		26,087		
Conservative hold		Swing		

General election 1955: Southend West
Party	Candidate	Votes	%	±%
Conservative	Henry Channon	27,326	64.2	−4.9
Labour	Victor G Marchesi	8,866	20.8	−10.1
Liberal	Heather Harvey	6,375	15.0	N/A
Majority		18,460	43.4	+5.2
Turnout		42,567	74.1	−4.9
Conservative hold		Swing		

General election 1951: Southend West
Party	Candidate	Votes	%	±%
Conservative	Henry Channon	39,287	69.1	+11.7
Labour	Henry N Lyall	17,352	30.9	+5.0
Majority		21,755	38.2	+6.7
Turnout		56,639	79.0	−4.1
Conservative hold		Swing		

General election 1950: Southend West
Party	Candidate	Votes	%	±%
Conservative	Henry Channon	34,100	57.4	
Labour Co-op	Eric Hutchison	15,345	25.9	
Liberal	John Scott	9,907	16.7	
Majority		18,746	31.5	
Turnout		59,352	83.1	
Conservative win (new seat)				

== See also ==
- Parliamentary constituencies in Essex
- List of parliamentary constituencies in the East of England (region)
