= Paul Channon =

British politician (1935–2007)

The Right Honourable The Lord Kelvedon PC
- Channon in 1988

Secretary of State for Transport
- In office 13 June 1987 – 24 July 1989
- Prime Minister: Margaret Thatcher
- Preceded by: John Moore
- Succeeded by: Cecil Parkinson

Secretary of State for Trade and Industry
- In office 24 January 1986 – 13 June 1987
- Prime Minister: Margaret Thatcher
- Preceded by: Leon Brittan
- Succeeded by: The Lord Young of Graffham

Minister of State for the Arts
- In office 5 January 1981 – 11 June 1983
- Prime Minister: Margaret Thatcher
- Preceded by: Norman St John-Stevas
- Succeeded by: The Earl of Gowrie

Member of Parliament for Southend West
- In office 29 January 1959 – 8 April 1997
- Preceded by: Henry Channon
- Succeeded by: David Amess

Member of the House of Lords
- Lord Temporal
- Life peerage 11 June 1997 – 27 January 2007

Personal details
- Born: 9 October 1935 London, England
- Died: 27 January 2007 (aged 71) Brentwood, Essex, England
- Party: Conservative
- Spouse: Ingrid Guinness (née Wyndham) (m. 1963)
- Children: 3
- Parent(s): Sir Henry Channon; Lady Honor Guinness
- Education: Christ Church, Oxford

Henry Paul Guinness Channon, Baron Kelvedon, PC (9 October 1935 – 27 January 2007) was Conservative MP for Southend West for 38 years, from 1959 until 1997. He served in various ministerial offices, and was a Cabinet minister for 3½ years, as President of the Board of Trade and Secretary of State for Trade and Industry from January 1986 to June 1987, and then as Secretary of State for Transport to July 1989.

== Early life ==
Channon was the only child of Sir Henry "Chips" Channon, the politician and diarist, and Lady Honor Channon, eldest daughter of Rupert Guinness, 2nd Earl of Iveagh. His family were well connected: his father's dearest friend was Prince Paul of Yugoslavia; he received a toy panda from King Edward VIII in the run up to the abdication; and he was friends with the Duke of Kent, who was born on the same day, from childhood. He was evacuated to live with the Astor family during the Second World War.

== Education ==
Channon was educated at two private schools: at Lockers Park School in Hemel Hempstead in Hertfordshire and Eton College in Eton, Berkshire. Playwright Terence Rattigan, an intimate companion of his father, dedicated his play The Winslow Boy (1946) to him.

Channon completed his national service in the Royal Horse Guards (the Blues) from 1955 to 1956, serving in Cyprus during the 1956 Cyprus emergency. In London, he was a member of the set around Princess Margaret, and then attended Christ Church, Oxford, from 1956. He was president of the Oxford University Conservative Association.

== Parliamentary career ==
While still a second-year undergraduate at Oxford, Channon was elected at the by-election for Southend West in January 1959 at the age of 23. The seat had connections with his family since 1912, when his grandfather, Rupert Guinness, became MP for South East Essex. Guinness became MP for the new seat of Southend in 1918. When Guinness succeeded his father as 2nd Earl of Iveagh in 1927, the seat was won by his wife, Gwendolen Guinness, Countess of Iveagh, who remained MP for Southend until she retired in 1935. She, in turn, was replaced by her son-in-law, Henry "Chips" Channon, who kept the seat until it was divided in 1950, and who then represented one of the seats that replaced it, Southend West, until his death in October 1958.

Channon won the nomination to his father's seat ahead of 129 other applicants and in spite of a campaign in Lord Beaverbrook's Daily Express against the apparent nepotism. His grandmother, Lady Iveagh, the former MP, congratulated the voters of Southend for "backing a colt when you know the stable he was trained in".

He left university to sit in Parliament, and remained the youngest MP until Teddy Taylor was elected in 1964 (Taylor was later MP for the neighbouring constituency of Southend East).

=== In government ===
Channon was parliamentary private secretary to Richard Wood, (later Lord Holderness), the Minister of Power, from 1959 to 1960, and then to R. A. Butler from 1961 to 1964 (while Butler was Home Secretary, First Secretary of State and then Foreign Secretary). Channon's father had once held the same position. Channon was elected to the executive of the 1922 Committee in 1965. He was one of few Conservative MPs to support the 1965 bill that ended capital punishment, and also opposed the unilateral declaration of independence by Ian Smith's Rhodesia.

In opposition, Conservative leader Edward Heath appointed Channon as a spokesman on public building and works in 1965, and then on arts in 1967. He served as a junior minister in the government led by Heath from 1970 to 1974, as Parliamentary Secretary at the Ministry of Housing and Local Government in 1970, then as Parliamentary Under-Secretary of State in the new Department of the Environment from 1970 to 1972, briefly as Minister of State at the Northern Ireland Office for six months in 1972, and then Minister of Housing and Construction from 1972 to 1974. Secretary of State for Northern Ireland William Whitelaw met IRA leader Sean MacStiofain and other Republicans at Channon's house in Chelsea on 7 July 1972. The talks ended in failure, and the IRA bombed Belfast repeatedly on Bloody Friday just two weeks later. Following the February 1974 general election, Channon joined Heath's shadow cabinet as environment spokesman. His services were dispensed with by Margaret Thatcher when she became leader of the Conservative Party in February 1975.

Channon joined the Conservative delegation to the Council of Europe and Western European Union in 1976, and considered standing in the first UK elections to the European Parliament in 1979, but failed to win the nomination for the North-East Essex seat.

He became Minister of State at the Civil Service Department when the Conservatives returned to power in 1979, and joined the Privy Council in 1980. After the department was abolished in 1981, he became Minister of the Arts. The call from 10 Downing Street came while he was swimming in the sea near his villa on the island of Mustique. He became Minister of State for Trade at the Department of Trade and Industry following the 1983 general election. He took charge of the department for two short periods, after Cecil Parkinson resigned following the Sara Keays affair in 1983, and while his successor, Norman Tebbit, recovered from his injuries sustained in the Brighton bombing in 1984. Channon became President of the Board of Trade and Secretary of State for Trade and Industry on 24 January 1986, after Leon Brittan resigned following the Westland affair.

Channon's time as Trade and Industry Secretary was marred in several ways. A major issue of the day was a takeover by the Guinness group using an inflated stock value via third parties – the Guinness share-trading fraud during its takeover of Distillers. As a member of the Guinness family, Channon had to stand aside from any investigation into the affair as he would have been accused of a conflict of interest. In addition, proposed sales of troubled nationalised carmarkers British Leyland to General Motors and of Austin Rover to Ford also fell through. Leyland Trucks was later sold to DAF. He blocked a proposed merger of Tate and Lyle with British Sugar and a takeover bid for Plessey by GEC. Channon was later alleged to have been involved in the government's secret supply of weapons of mass destruction to Iraq.

=== Transport Secretary ===
Channon was appointed Secretary of State for Transport on 13 June 1987. His tenure as Transport Secretary was blighted by several major transport disasters: 31 died in the King's Cross fire on 18 November 1987; 35 were killed when three trains crashed near Britain's busiest railway station in the Clapham Junction rail crash on 12 December 1988; 270 died when Pan Am Flight 103 was brought down by a bomb over Scottish town of Lockerbie in the Lockerbie Disaster on 21 December 1988; and 44 died when a British Midland plane crashed beside the M1 motorway in the Kegworth air disaster on 8 January 1989. He was roughly treated in the House of Commons by Labour's transport spokesman, John Prescott, who pilloried him for underinvestment in the rail network, and for taking a family holiday to Mustique shortly after the Lockerbie disaster.

A coincidence led to Channon's sacking in July 1989 as Transport Secretary. British investigative journalist, Paul Foot, in a 1994 article for the London Review of Books, described what happened:

The American investigative columnist, Jack Anderson, has had some scoops in his time but none more significant than his revelation – in January 1990 – that in mid-March 1989, three months after Lockerbie, George Bush rang Margaret Thatcher to warn her to 'cool it' on the subject. On what seems to have been the very same day [in March 1989], perhaps a few hours earlier, Thatcher's Secretary of State for Transport, Paul Channon, was the guest of five prominent political correspondents at a lunch at the Garrick Club. It was agreed that anything said at the lunch was 'on strict lobby terms' – that is, for the journalists only, not their readers. Channon then announced that the Dumfries and Galloway Police – the smallest police force in Britain – had concluded a criminal investigation into the Lockerbie crash. They had found who was responsible and arrests were expected before long. So sensational was the revelation that at least one of the five journalists broke ranks; and the news that the Lockerbie villains would soon be behind bars in Scotland was divulged to the public. Channon promptly said that he was not the source of the story. Denounced in a front page story in the Daily Mirror as a "liar", he did not sue or complain. A few months later he was quietly sacked. Thatcher could not blame her loyal minister for his indiscretion, which coincided with her instructions from the White House.

Channon was replaced by Cecil Parkinson on 24 July 1989.

=== Backbenches and retirement ===
Channon harboured hopes of becoming the fourth member of his family to become Speaker of the House of Commons, but he withdrew from the election to replace Bernard Weatherill in 1992. He later served as chairman of the House of Commons Finance and Services Committee and chairman of the Transport Select Committee.

He retired from Parliament at the 1997 general election and was created a life peer as Baron Kelvedon, of Ongar in the County of Essex, on 11 June 1997, named after the family's house at Kelvedon Hall.

Outside politics, he was a member of the board of directors of Guinness, and served with the Guinness Trust.

== Personal life ==
In 1963, Channon married Ingrid Guinness (née Wyndham), the former wife of his cousin Jonathan Guinness. He inherited three stepchildren, and they had three children themselves: Henry, Georgia, and Olivia Gwendolen. In 1986, 22-year-old Olivia died from the effects of drink and drugs during a party in the Christ Church, Oxford, rooms of Count Gottfried von Bismarck. The coroner recorded a verdict of misadventure. Henry Channon died on 24 October 2021, aged 51.

== Death ==
In later years, Channon suffered from Alzheimer's disease. He died at his home in Brentwood, Essex, on 27 January 2007, at the age of 71.

== Ancestry ==
Ancestors of Paul Channon

4. Henry Channon
2. Sir Henry Channon
10. George Frederick Westover
5. Vesta Miller Westover
11. Elizabeth Quackenbush Miller
1. Paul Channon, Baron Kelvedon
12. Edward Guinness, 1st Earl of Iveagh
6. Rupert Guinness, 2nd Earl of Iveagh
13. Adelaide Guinness
3. Lady Honor Guinness
14. William Onslow, 4th Earl of Onslow
7. Gwendolen Onslow, Countess of Iveagh
15. Hon. Florence Coulston Gardner

Parliament of the United Kingdom
Preceded by Henry Channon	Member of Parliament for Southend West; 1959–1997	Succeeded by David Amess
Honorary titles
Preceded by Patrick Wolrige-Gordon	Baby of the House; 1959–1964	Succeeded by Teddy Taylor
Political offices
Preceded by Norman St John-Stevas	Minister of State for the Arts; 1981–1983	Succeeded by The Earl of Gowrie
Preceded by Leon Brittan	Secretary of State for Trade and Industry; 1986–1987	Succeeded by The Lord Young of Graffham
Preceded by John Moore	Secretary of State for Transport; 1987–1989	Succeeded by Cecil Parkinson
