= The Coppice, Kelvedon Hatch =

Site of Special Scientific Interest in Essex, England

Coordinates: 51.67°N 0.273°E

- Site of Special Scientific Interest
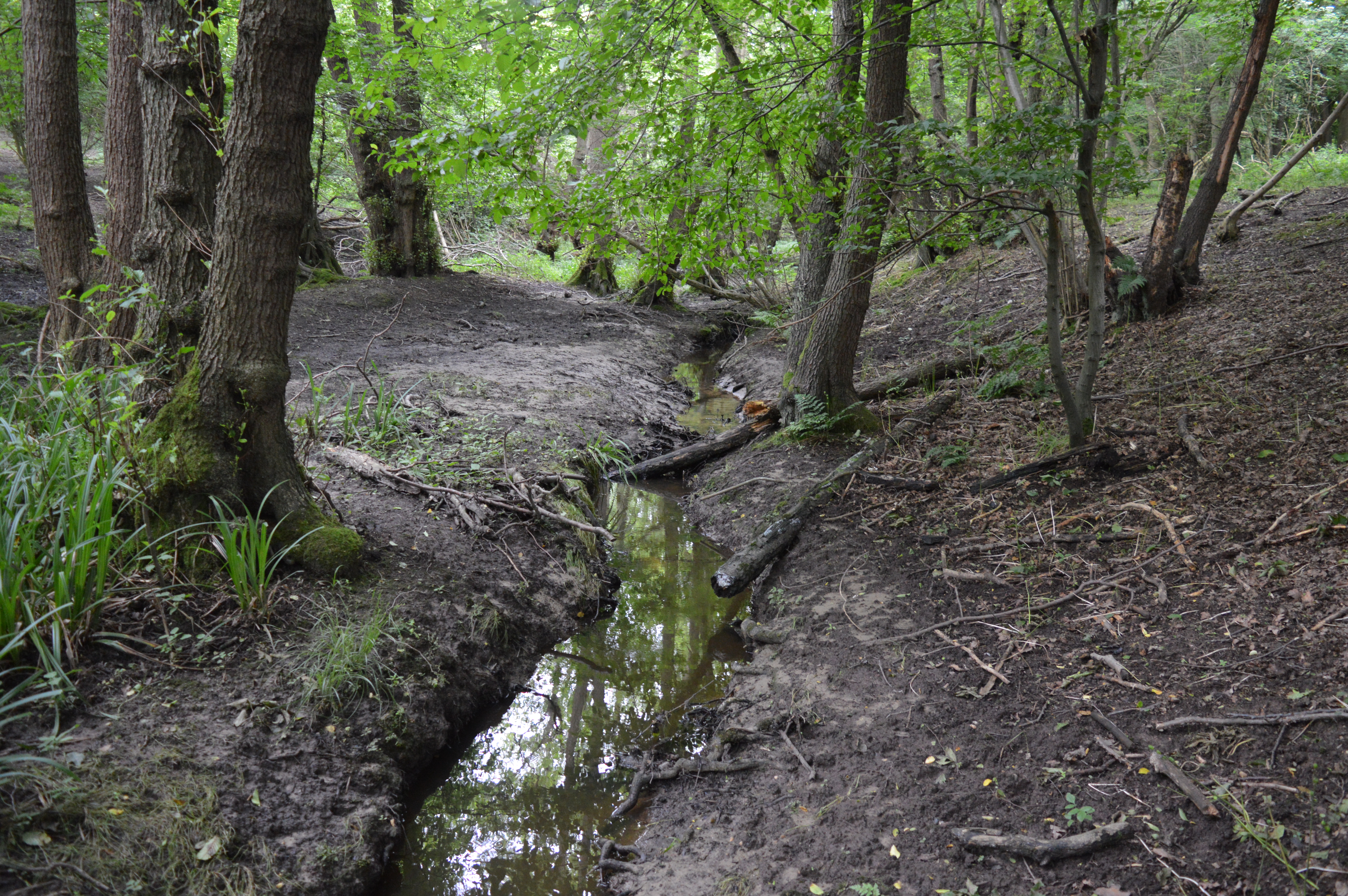
- Location of The Coppice, Kelvedon Hatch.
- Area of search: Essex
- Grid reference: TQ 574993
- Interest: Biological
- Area: 9.4 ha (23 acres)
- Notification date: 1986
- Location map: Magic Map

The Coppice, Kelvedon Hatch is a 9.4-hectare (23-acre) biological Site of Special Scientific Interest in Kelvedon Hatch in Essex.

The site is an ancient semi-natural wood in the valley of a small tributary of the River Roding. It is base-rich alder on the valley floor, and oak and hornbeam in other areas. The geology is complex, with areas of Claygate Beds and Bagshot Beds. The shrub layer is sparse, but the stream provides an additional habitat.

There is no public access, but a footpath runs along the western boundary.
