= Henry Channon =

American-born British politician (1897–1958)

Sir Henry Channon
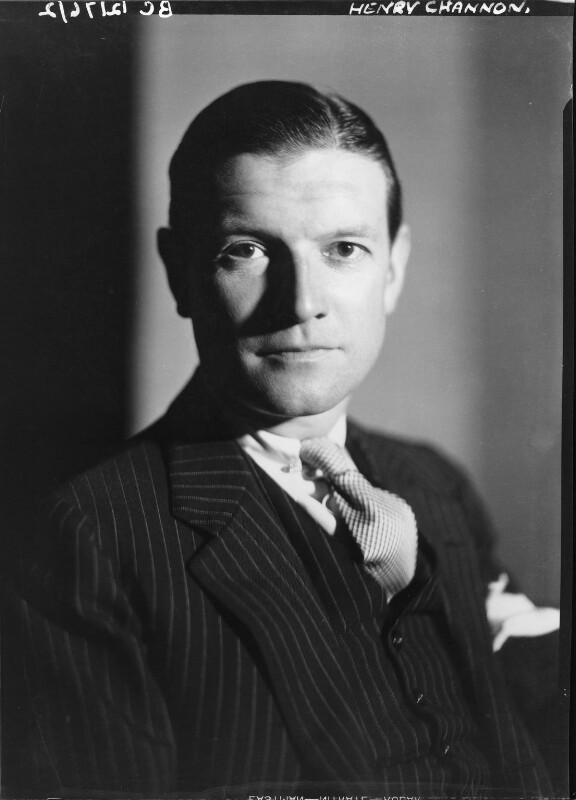
- 1930 portrait

Member of Parliament for Southend West Southend (1935–1950)
- In office 14 November 1935 – 7 October 1958
- Preceded by: The Countess of Iveagh
- Succeeded by: Paul Channon

Personal details
- Born: 7 March 1897 Chicago, Illinois, U.S.
- Died: 7 October 1958 (aged 61) London, England
- Party: Conservative
- Spouse: Lady Honor Guinness (m. 1933; div. 1945)
- Children: Paul Channon
- Education: University of Chicago; Christ Church, Oxford

Sir Henry Channon (7 March 1897 – 7 October 1958), known as Chips Channon, was an American-born British Conservative Party politician, author and diarist. Channon moved to England in 1920 and became strongly anti-American, feeling that American cultural and economic preponderance threatened traditional European and British civilisation. Channon quickly became enamoured of London society and became a social and political figure.

Channon was first elected as a member of parliament (MP) in 1935. In his political career he served as Parliamentary Private Secretary to Rab Butler at the Foreign Office from 1938 in the Chamberlain administration and though he retained that position under Winston Churchill he did not subsequently achieve ministerial office, partly as a result of his close association with the Chamberlain faction. He is remembered as one of the most famous political and social diarists of the 20th century. His diaries were first published in an expurgated edition in 1967. They were later released in extenso, edited by Simon Heffer and published by Hutchinson in three volumes, between 2021 and 2022.

== Biography ==
=== Early years ===
Henry Channon was born on 7 March 1897 in Chicago, Illinois, to an Anglo-American family. In adult life he took to giving 1899 as his year of birth, and was embarrassed when a British newspaper revealed that the true year was 1897. His grandfather had emigrated to the US in the mid-nineteenth century and established a profitable fleet of vessels on the Great Lakes, which formed the basis of the family's wealth. Channon's paternal grandmother was descended from eighteenth-century English settlers.

Channon's parents were Henry ("Harry") Channon II and his wife Vesta (née Westover). After graduating from Francis W. Parker School and taking classes at the University of Chicago, Channon travelled to France with the American Red Cross in October 1917 and became an honorary attaché at the American embassy in Paris the next year. Channon associated with the artistic elite of Paris, having dinners with the writer Marcel Proust and poet Jean Cocteau.

In 1920 and 1921, Channon was at Christ Church, Oxford where he received a pass degree in French, and acquired the nickname "Chips". He began a lifelong friendship with Prince Paul of Yugoslavia, whom in his diaries he called "the person I have loved most". The Oxford Dictionary of National Biography (ODNB) said of this phase of Channon's life, "adoring London society, privilege, rank, and wealth, he became an energetic, implacable, but endearing social climber." He also became an author. For a time, Channon lived in the same London house with Prince Paul and another of Channon's confidants, Lord Gage.

=== Author ===
Channon rejected his American background and was passionate about Europe in general and England in particular. The United States, he said, was "a menace to the peace and future of the world. If it triumphs, the old civilisations, which love beauty and peace and the arts and rank and privilege, will pass from the picture."

His anti-Americanism was reflected in his novel, Joan Kennedy (1929), described by the publishers as "the story of an English girl's marriage to a wealthy American and of her attempts to bridge the gulf created by differences of race and education." Channon's anti-Americanism did not prevent his living off his family's money, which had been made in America. A grant of $90,000 from his father, and an $85,000 inheritance from his grandfather made him financially comfortable with no need to work.

He wrote two more books: a second novel, Paradise City (1931) about the disastrous effects of American capitalism, and a non-fiction work, The Ludwigs of Bavaria (1933). The latter, a study of the last generations of the ruling Wittelsbach dynasty of Bavarian kings, received excellent notices, and was in print twenty years later. Some critical reservations reflected Channon's adulation of minor European royalty: The Manchester Guardian said of his account of the 1918 revolution, "he seems to have depended almost exclusively on aristocratic sources, which are most clearly insufficient." Despite this, the book was described on its reissue in 1952 as "a fascinating study... excellently written".

=== Relationships ===
In 1933, Channon married the brewing heiress Lady Honor Guinness (1909–1976), eldest daughter of Rupert Guinness, 2nd Earl of Iveagh. In 1935, their only child was born, a son, whom they named Paul. On 31 January 1936, the Channons moved into a grand London house at 5 Belgrave Square, near the London house of the Duke of Kent, and two years later also acquired a country estate, Kelvedon Hall, at Kelvedon Hatch near Brentwood in Essex. Channon quickly established himself as a society host, in his blue and silver dining room designed by Stéphane Boudin and modelled on the Amalienburg in Munich. Perhaps the apogee of his career in that role came on 19 November 1936, with a guest list headed by King Edward VIII and Mrs Simpson, of whom Channon was a friend and admirer, Prince Paul of Yugoslavia, then Regent and his wife Princess Olga of Greece and Denmark, the Duke of Kent and his wife Princess Marina of Greece and Denmark .

In July 1939, Channon met the landscape designer Peter Daniel Coats (1910–1990), with whom he began an affair that may have contributed to Channon's separation from his wife the following year. His wife, who had conducted extra-marital affairs from at least 1937, asked Channon for a divorce in 1941 as a result of her affair with Frank Woodsman, a farmer and horse dealer who was based close to their Kelvedon Hall estate. Their marriage was finally dissolved in 1945. Channon formally sued for divorce and his wife did not contest the suit. Among others with whom Channon had a relationship was the playwright Terence Rattigan. Channon was on close terms with Prince Paul of Yugoslavia and the Duke of Kent, although whether those relationships extended beyond the platonic is not known.

=== Politics ===
Channon, who was a naturalised British subject (as of 11 July 1933), joined the Conservative Party. At the 1935 general election, he was elected as the member of parliament for Southend, the seat previously held by his mother-in-law Gwendolen Guinness, Countess of Iveagh. After boundary changes in 1950, he was returned for the new Southend West constituency, holding the seat until his death in 1958.

In March 1938, the rising Conservative minister Rab Butler, the Parliamentary Under-Secretary of State at the Foreign Office appointed Channon his Parliamentary Private Secretary. Butler was associated with the appeasement wing of the Conservative party, and Channon, as with the abdication, found himself on the losing side. In the words of the ODNB: "Always ferociously anti-communist, he was an early dupe of the Nazis because his attractive German princelings hoped that Hitler might be preparing for a Hohenzollern restoration." At the invitation of Joachim von Ribbentrop, Channon attended the 1936 Berlin Summer Olympics, where he was very impressed.

Channon visited a concentration camp, which he praised in his diary as "tidy, even gay", being described in a 2021 article as "impressed" by what he saw. Normally a snob, Channon wrote that the purpose of these camps was to "wipe out class feeling". Speaking of the Nazi concept of the Volksgemeinschaft (people's community), Channon noted that "class feeling has become practically non-existent in Germany".

In September 1938 during the Sudetenland crisis, Butler was in Geneva heading the British delegation to the League of Nations. As the parliamentary private secretary to Butler, Channon was also in Geneva, where he expressed much loathing for the League in his diary, calling it "that absurd little Assembly" whose meetings were "unsitthroughable". Channon wrote in his diary: "The League is now really only an anti-dictator club. The bar and lobbies of the League's building are full of Russians and Jews who intrigue with and dominate the press, and spend their time spreading rumors of approaching war, but I don't believe them, not with Neville at the helm. He will wriggle out somehow". However, despite his dislike of the League, Channon enjoyed the grand parties in Geneva. Channon wrote in his diary that the League of Nations was a "racket" and called the Soviet foreign commissar Maxim Litvinov "the dread intriguer" through "not so evil as Maisky". Channon was much enraged when he overheard Litvinov telling the chief of the Spanish delegation "better hope for a world war because otherwise you're fucked!" Channon took Litvinov's remark as evidence that the Soviet Union wanted to push the world into another world war.

President Edvard Beneš of Czechoslovakia was known to be a supporter of the "new diplomacy" associated with the League of Nations, and a major fear of the British government was that if Germany invaded Czechoslovakia, Beneš would try to activate the collective security provisions of the League, which in theory would commit all of the League member states to come to the aid of Czechoslovakia. Britain as a permanent member of the League Council had the power of the veto, so in practice, there was no chance of the League ordering Britain to go to war, but the Chamberlain government felt it would be embarrassing to veto a Czechoslovak request for help from the League. As a consequence, Butler and Channon fought hard to prevent the League from discussing the Sudetenland crisis at all in September 1938.

After George VI's accession Channon's standing in royal circles went from high to low and, as an appeaser, so did his standing in the Conservative party after the failure of appeasement and the appointment of the anti-appeaser Winston Churchill as prime minister. Channon remained loyal to the supplanted Neville Chamberlain, toasting him after his fall as "the King over the Water", and sharing Butler's denigration of Churchill as "a half-breed American". Channon remained a friend of Chamberlain's widow. Channon's interest in politics waned after this, and he took an increasing interest in the Guinness family brewing interests, though remaining a conscientious and popular constituency MP.

Once it became clear that he would not achieve ministerial office, Channon focused on his other goal of elevation to the peerage, but in this, too, he was unsuccessful. The highest honour he achieved was a knighthood in 1957. His friend Princess Marthe Bibesco sent him a telegram, "Goodbye Mr. Chips" (referencing the 1934 novella of that name by James Hilton). Channon, who smoked and drank heavily, died from a stroke at a hospital in London on 7 October 1958, at the age of 61.

== Legacy ==
=== Diaries ===
At various points in his life Channon kept a series of diaries. Under his will, he left his diaries and other material to the British Museum "on condition that the said diaries shall not be read ... until 60 years from my death." An expurgated selection from the diaries was published in 1967. The necessity for expurgation is illustrated by the reaction of an Oxford contemporary who, when told that no diaries from that period existed, said, "Thank God!" The editor of the original edition, Robert Rhodes James, said he saw well-connected people go white when they heard that Channon had kept a journal.

An entry in Channon's diary for 1941, describing his introduction to a young member of the Greek royal family at an Athens cocktail party, is the earliest known reference to the future marriage of Prince Philip of Greece and then 15-year-old heiress presumptive to the British throne, Princess Elizabeth: "He is extraordinarily handsome, and I recalled my afternoon's conversation with Princess Nicholas [an aunt of Philip's]. He is to be our Prince Consort, and that is why he is serving in our Navy!!? He is here on leave for a few days with his more than mad mother. He is a charmeur; but I should deplore such a marriage: he and Princess Elizabeth are too inter-related and the Mountbatten–Hesse family are famous for their ill-luck and madness. Disaster pursues them."

In his comments accompanying the published selection, Rhodes James stated that "Peter Coats edited the original MS of the Diaries." He also stated that Coats arranged the preparation of a complete typescript of the Diaries as Channon's handwriting was often difficult to read. Coats also carried out an initial expurgation before the editorial discretion exercised by Rhodes James.

Robert Rhodes James quotes in his introduction to the diaries a self-portrait written by Channon on 19 July 1935:

Sometimes I think I have an unusual character – able but trivial; I have flair, intuition, great good taste but only second rate ambition: I am far too susceptible to flattery; I hate and am uninterested in all the things most men like such as sports, business, statistics, debates, speeches, war, and the weather; but I am riveted by lust, furniture, glamour and society and jewels. I am an excellent organiser and have a will of iron; I can only be appealed to through my vanity. Occasionally I must have solitude: my soul craves for it. All thought is done in solitude; only then am I partly happy.

Comparing the above with the same section in the unexpurgated version of the Diaries gives some idea of how heavily Rhodes James, and/or Coats, laid his editorial hand on the manuscript:

Sometimes I think I have the character of a very clever woman – able, but trivial with flair, intuition, great good taste and second-rate ambition: I am susceptible to flattery, and male good looks; I hate and am uninterested in all the things men like such as sport, business, statistics, debates, speeches, war and the weather; but I am riveted by lust, bibelots, furniture and glamour, society and jewels. Of course I am an excellent organiser and bear a will of iron; I can only be appealed to through my vanity. I revel in a few hours alone. I must have solitude: my soul craves for it. All thought is done in solitude; only then am I partly happy.

Reviewing the published diaries in The Observer in November 1967, Malcolm Muggeridge wrote, "Grovellingly sycophantic and snobbish as only a well-heeled American nesting among the English upper classes can be, with a commonness that positively hurts at times. And yet – how sharp an eye! What neat malice! How, in their own fashion, well written and truthful and honest they are! … What a relief to turn to him after Sir Winston's windy rhetoric, and all those leaden narratives by field-marshals, air-marshals and admirals!"

The diaries, even in their bowdlerised form, provoked a writ for libel from one of Channon's fellow MPs, though the case did not come to court, being settled privately in the decade after Channon's death. Historian Alan Clark, a Conservative MP from February 1974, refers on multiple occasions to Channon's diaries in his own diaries.

Four previously unknown volumes turned up at a car boot sale in 1991. It was reported after Paul Channon's death that his heir, the diarist's grandson, was considering authorising the publication of the uncensored texts. An unexpurgated three-volume edition, edited by journalist and historian Simon Heffer has now been published; the first volume was published in March 2021. While the 1967 edition began in 1934, the first volume of the complete version begins in 1918, and runs to 1938. However, diaries Channon wrote between 1929 and 1933 remain missing. The second volume, running from 1938 to 1943, was published on 9 September 2021; the third volume, covering years from 1943 to 1957, was published on 8 September 2022.

Reviewing the first volume, Lord Lexden reported in The House magazine, "If diaries are to achieve immortality, the diarist must be a first-class writer. Channon passes that test with flying colours."

=== Reputation ===
Richard Davenport-Hines, the author of Channon's entry in the Oxford Dictionary of National Biography (ODNB) claims that Elliot Templeton in W. Somerset Maugham's novel The Razor's Edge (1944) and the disappointed schoolmaster Crocker-Harris in Terence Rattigan's play The Browning Version (1948) were partly inspired by Channon.

Among his contemporaries, Channon's reputation ranged from high to low. Following the 1967 publication of the selected diaries, Nancy Mitford said that "you can't think how vile & spiteful & silly it is. [...] One always thought Chips was rather a dear, but he was black inside[,] how sinister!" Duff Cooper thought Channon a "toady" but Cooper's widow, Lady Diana Cooper, wrote immediately after Channon's death, "never was there a surer or more enlivening friend ... . He installed the mighty in his gilded chairs and exalted the humble ... without stint he gave of his riches and his compassion."

Max Hastings referred to Channon as a "consummate ass".

== Notes ==
Parliament of the United Kingdom
Preceded by The Countess of Iveagh	Member of Parliament for Southend; 1935–1950	Constituency abolished
New constituency	Member of Parliament for Southend West; 1950–1958	Succeeded by Paul Channon
