= Southend (constituency) =

Parliamentary constituency in the United Kingdom, 1918–1950

- Former borough constituency for the House of Commons

1918–1950
- Seats: one
- Created from: South East Essex
- Replaced by: Southend East; Southend West

Southend-on-Sea was a parliamentary constituency centred on the then-town of Southend-on-Sea in Essex. It returned one Member of Parliament to the House of Commons of the Parliament of the United Kingdom.

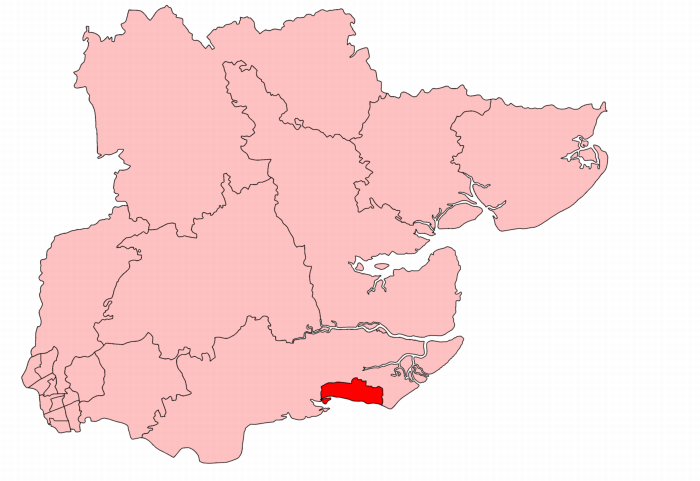
Southend in Essex, 1918–1950

== History ==
The constituency was created under the Representation of the People Act 1918 by splitting the County Borough of Southend-on-Sea from the existing constituency of South East Essex. The sitting MP for that constituency, Rupert Guinness, was elected to the new constituency. It was abolished for the 1950 general election, when the expanded County Borough (which had incorporated the Urban District of Shoeburyness) was divided into the new constituencies of Southend East and Southend West.

== Boundaries ==
1918–1945: The County Borough of Southend-on-Sea.

1945–1950: Part of the County Borough of Southend-on-Sea. (No changes to constituency boundaries).

== Members of Parliament ==
Election	Member	Party
1918	Rupert Guinness, Viscount Elveden	Conservative
1927 by-election	Gwendolen Guinness, Countess of Iveagh	Conservative
1935	Henry Channon	Conservative
1950	constituency abolished: see Southend East and Southend West	

=== Guinness family ===
For most of the 20th century, this constituency and one of its successors was held by four members of the Guinness family. When Rupert Guinness was elevated to the Peerage upon the death of his father, he was succeeded by his wife, Gwendolen. When she retired in 1935 she was succeeded by her eldest daughter's husband, Henry "Chips" Channon. Channon continued to serve as MP for one of the successor constituencies, Southend West, until his death in 1958. That seat was then represented by his son, Paul Channon, until 1997. Because of this connection, the seat became known in the media as "Guinness-on-Sea".

== Elections ==
=== Elections in the 1910s ===
General election 1918: Southend
Party		Candidate	Votes	%
C	Unionist	Rupert Guinness	12,392	63.3
	Ind. Conservative	Joseph Francis	4,242	21.6
	Liberal	Chalton Hubbard	2,965	15.1
Majority			8,150	41.7
Turnout			19,599	53.9
	Unionist win (new seat)			
C indicates candidate endorsed by the coalition government.

=== Elections in the 1920s ===
General election 1922: Southend
Party	Candidate	Votes	%	±%
Unionist	Rupert Guinness	17,920	61.9	−1.4
Liberal	Henry George Walker	11,039	38.1	+23.0
Majority		6,881	23.8	−17.9
Turnout		28,959	68.0	+14.1
Unionist hold		Swing	−12.2	

General election 1923: Southend
Party	Candidate	Votes	%	±%
Unionist	Rupert Guinness	15,566	50.2	−11.7
Liberal	Douglas Young	15,453	49.8	+11.7
Majority		113	0.4	−23.4
Turnout		31,019	69.3	+1.3
Unionist hold		Swing	−11.7	

General election 1924: Southend
Party	Candidate	Votes	%	±%
Unionist	Rupert Guinness	23,417	62.5	+12.3
Liberal	Douglas Young	10,924	29.1	−20.7
Labour	Sydney Alexander Moseley	3,144	8.4	New
Majority		12,493	33.4	+30.0
Turnout		37,485	79.3	+10.0
Unionist hold		Swing		

1927 Southend by-election
Party	Candidate	Votes	%	±%
Unionist	Gwendolen Guinness	21,221	54.6	−7.9
Liberal	Dougal Meston	11,912	30.7	+1.6
Labour	James Erskine Harper	4,777	12.3	+3.9
Ind. Conservative	E.A. Hailwood	917	2.4	New
Majority		9,309	23.9	−9.5
Turnout		38,827	73.2	−6.1
Unionist hold		Swing		

General election 1929: Southend
Party	Candidate	Votes	%	±%
Unionist	Gwendolen Guinness	27,605	55.8	−6.7
Liberal	Dougal Meston	21,884	44.2	+15.1
Majority		5,721	11.6	−21.8
Turnout		49,489	67.0	−12.3
Unionist hold		Swing		

=== Elections in the 1930s ===
General election 1931: Southend
Party	Candidate	Votes	%	±%
Conservative	Gwendolen Guinness	46,564	85.7	+29.9
Labour	Albert Bechervaise	7,741	14.3	New
Majority		38,823	71.4	+59.8
Turnout		54,305	68.5	+1.5
Conservative hold		Swing		

General election 1935: Southend
Party	Candidate	Votes	%	±%
Conservative	Henry Channon	36,865	65.1	−20.6
Liberal	Murray Gladstone	11,934	21.1	New
Labour	Helen Keynes	7,796	13.8	−0.5
Majority		24,931	44.0	−27.4
Turnout		56,595	65.9	−2.6
Conservative hold		Swing		

General Election 1939–40

Another General Election was required to take place before the end of 1940. The political parties had been making preparations for an election to take place and by the Autumn of 1939, the following candidates had been selected;

- Conservative: Henry Channon
- Liberal: Phillip Whitehead
- Labour: GR Sandison

=== Elections in the 1940s ===
General election 1945: Southend
Party	Candidate	Votes	%	±%
Conservative	Henry Channon	23,712	44.6	−20.5
Labour	Gordon Sandison	20,635	38.9	+20.1
Liberal	H Douglas Tanner	8,735	16.5	−4.6
Majority		3,077	5.7	−38.3
Turnout		53,082	73.3	+7.4
Conservative hold		Swing		
