= 1927 Southend by-election =

1927 UK parliamentary by-election

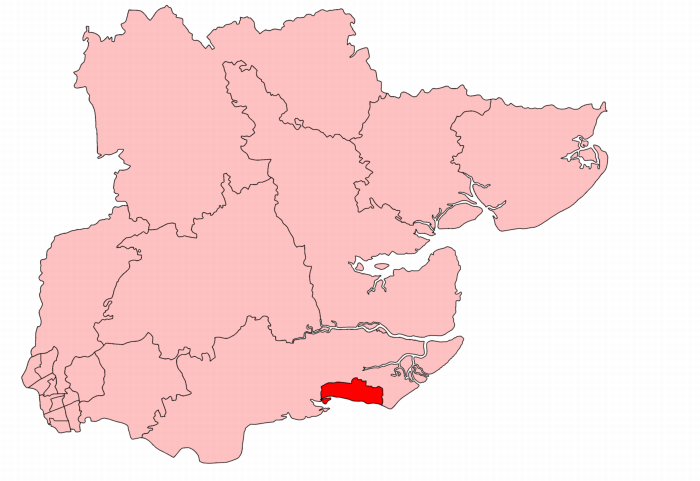
Southend in Essex, showing boundaries used from 1918 to 1950.

The 1927 Southend by-election was a parliamentary by-election for the British House of Commons constituency of Southend, Essex, on 19 November 1927.

== Previous MP ==
The Conservative MP, Rupert Guinness, Viscount Elveden succeeded his father as Earl of Iveagh and took a seat in the House of Lords, vacating his seat in the House of Commons. He had represented the seat and its predecessor since 1912 and the area had not returned any other party since the Liberals won in 1906.

== Previous result ==
General election, 29 October 1924 Electorate: 47,259
Party	Candidate	Votes	%	±%
Conservative	Rupert Guinness	23,417	62.5	+12.3
Liberal	John Douglas Young	10,924	29.1	−20.7
Labour	Sydney Alexander Moseley	3,144	8.4	New
Majority		12,493	33.4	+30.0
Turnout		37,485	79.3	+10.0
Conservative hold		Swing		

== Candidates ==
The Conservatives chose the former MP's wife, 46-year-old Gwendolen Guinness, now titled the Countess of Iveagh to defend the seat. The Liberal candidate was 33-year-old Hon. Dougall Meston. He was a former soldier who had become a Barrister in 1924. He was the heir to Baron Meston. This was his first election as a candidate. Labour selected a new candidate in James Erskine Harper. A fourth candidate entered the contest in the figure of a 52-year-old Manchester baker, E.A. Hailwood. He put himself forward as a candidate protesting against Baldwin's lack of leadership as Prime Minister.

== Result ==
Southend by-election, 1927
Party	Candidate	Votes	%	±%
Unionist	Gwendolen Guinness	21,221	54.6	−7.9
Liberal	Dougall Meston	11,912	30.7	+1.6
Labour	James Erskine Harper	4,777	12.3	+3.9
Ind. Unionist	E. A. Hailwood	917	2.4	+2.4
Majority		9,309	23.9	−9.5
Turnout		38,827	73.2	−6.1
Unionist hold		Swing		

Harper (Labour) and Hailwood (Ind. Unionist) lost their deposits.

== Aftermath ==
Hailwood went on to contest a further two by-elections as an Independent Conservative. Labour chose not to contest the seat at the following General Election.

General election, 30 May 1929 Electorate: 73,815
Party	Candidate	Votes	%	±%
Conservative	Gwendolen Guinness	27,605	55.8	+1.2
Liberal	Dougall Meston	21,884	44.2	+13.5
Majority		5,721	11.6	−12.3
Turnout		49,489	67.0	−6.2
Conservative hold		Swing		
