= William Kellner =

Austrian art director (1900–1996)

William Kellner (30 July 1900 – May, 1996) was an Austrian-born art director who worked primarily on British films in the 1940s and 1950s. He began his career as a draughtsman working for Michael Powell and Emeric Pressburger on their films A Canterbury Tale (1944) and I Know Where I'm Going! (1945) and on David Lean's Brief Encounter in 1946. He was also art director on two Ealing Comedies, Kind Hearts and Coronets (1949) and the Lavender Hill Mob (1951). Kellner was nominated for two Oscars, in 1949 for Basil Dearden's Saraband for Dead Lovers and in 1959 for Joseph L. Mankiewicz's adaptation of Tennessee Williams' Suddenly Last Summer. He worked on two Anthony Asquith all-star productions, The V.I.P.s and The Yellow Rolls-Royce, both in 1964, before retiring in 1965.

== See also ==
- List of German-speaking Academy Award winners and nominees
