= William Onslow, 4th Earl of Onslow =

British Conservative politician and Governor of New Zealand (1853–1911)

The Right Honourable The Earl of Onslow GCMG PC DL
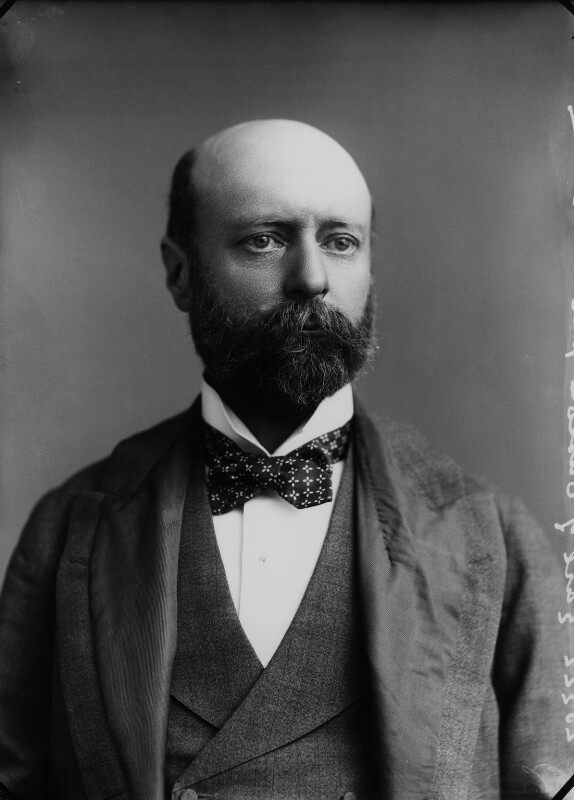
- Onslow in 1895

11th Governor of New Zealand
- In office 2 May 1889 – 24 February 1892
- Monarch: Victoria
- Premier: Harry Atkinson; John Ballance
- Preceded by: Sir William Jervois
- Succeeded by: The Earl of Glasgow

President of the Board of Agriculture
- In office 19 May 1903 – 12 March 1905
- Monarch: Edward VII
- Prime Minister: Arthur Balfour
- Preceded by: Robert William Hanbury
- Succeeded by: Ailwyn Fellowes

Personal details
- Born: 7 March 1853 Old Alresford, Hampshire, England
- Died: 23 October 1911 (aged 58) Hendon, Middlesex, England
- Party: Conservative
- Spouse: Florence Gardner (d. 1934)
- Children: Dorothy Wood, Countess of Halifax; Richard Onslow, 5th Earl of Onslow; Gwendolen Guinness, Countess of Iveagh; Victor Onslow
- Education: Exeter College, Oxford

William Hillier Onslow, 4th Earl of Onslow, GCMG, PC, DL (7 March 1853 – 23 October 1911), was a British Conservative politician. He held several governmental positions between 1880 and 1905 and was also Governor of New Zealand between 1889 and 1892.

== Background and education ==
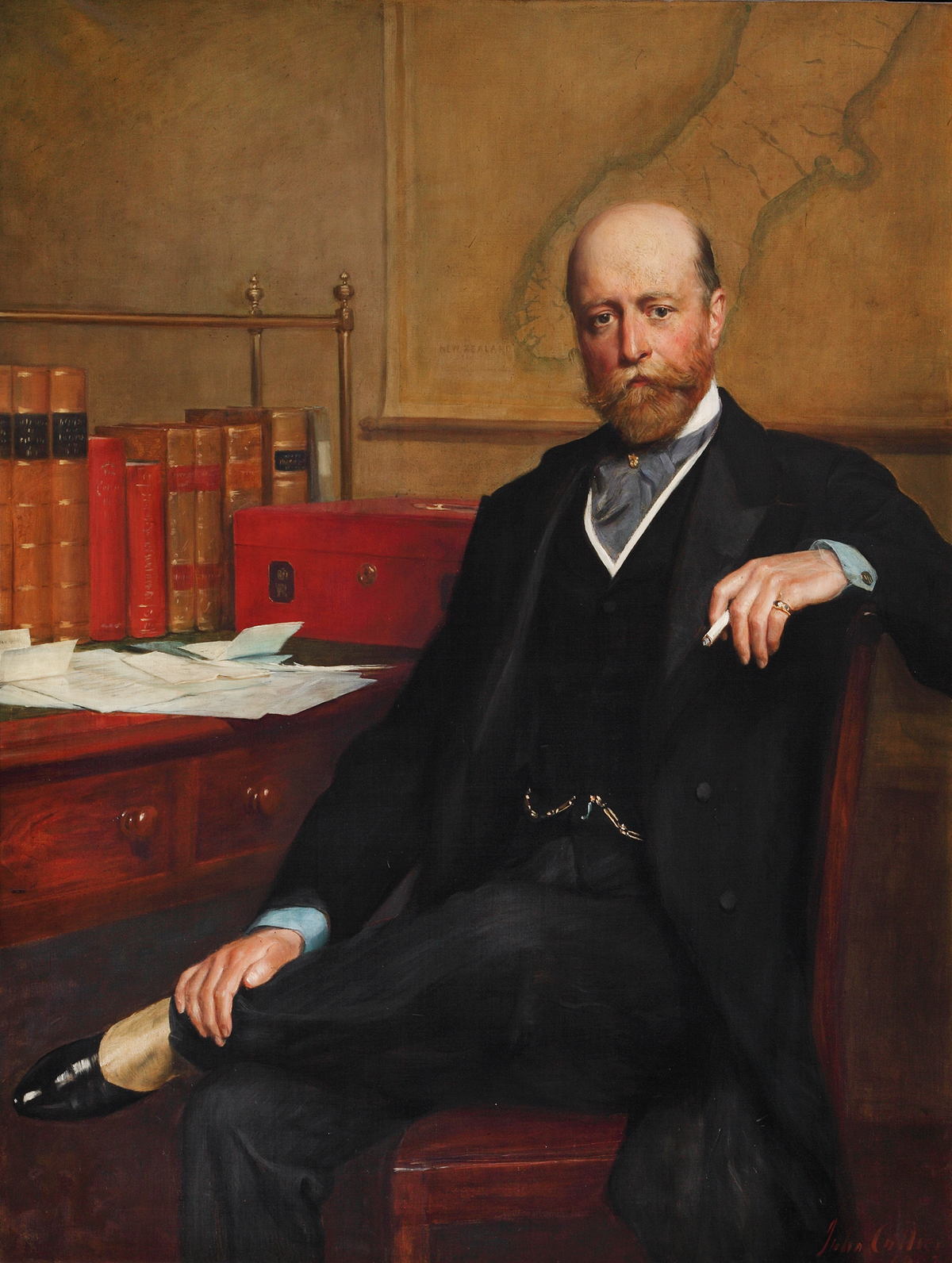
The Earl of Onslow in front of a map of New Zealand

Born at Old Alresford, Hampshire, Onslow was the only son of George Augustus Cranley Onslow, son of Thomas Cranley Onslow, second son of Thomas Onslow, 2nd Earl of Onslow. His mother was Mary Harriet Anne Loftus. In 1870, at the age of 17, he succeeded his great-uncle in the earldom of Onslow. He was educated at Eton and Exeter College, Oxford.

== Political career, 1880–1889 ==
Onslow briefly served as a Lord-in-waiting (government whip in the House of Lords) under the Earl of Beaconsfield (Benjamin Disraeli) between February and April 1880 and held the same position under Lord Salisbury between 1886 and 1887, and later served under Salisbury as Under-Secretary of State for the Colonies between 1887 and 1888 (in which post he was vice president of the first Colonial Conference in April 1887) and as Parliamentary Secretary to the Board of Trade between 1888 and 1889.

== Governor of New Zealand, 1889–1892 ==
In November 1888 Onslow was appointed Governor of New Zealand. As a result of the economic downturn in the late 1880s, he had sought a salaried position as a colonial governor. At 35, he was the youngest governor of New Zealand since George Grey was appointed in 1845 and the first since Robert FitzRoy in 1843 to have no previous experience in a vice-regal position. The New Zealand government had recently cut allowances for the governor, and Onslow was able to obtain the position mainly as it was no longer attractive to more senior colonial administrators.

He assumed the office on 2 May 1889. Shortly after his arrival in Wellington, there was an outbreak of typhoid fever in the town. Onslow's twelve-year-old son and heir, Viscount Cranley, caught the disease and was at one time seen to be in danger of his life. After this Onslow and his family avoided the capital as much as they could - which did not endear them to the New Zealand people. According to the Dictionary of New Zealand Biography, Onslow did not "have the flair or flamboyance which helped some later governors win popular support".

In 1890 Onslow became embroiled in controversy over appointments to the Legislative Council (the upper house of the New Zealand parliament), which were made by the governor on the advice of his ministers. Up until then Prime Minister Harry Atkinson had not made any recommendations on appointments. However, this year Atkinson's conservative supporters became more and more concerned that the Liberals under John Ballance would gain power. Atkinson was put under pressure to assure that there was a conservative majority in the council. Onslow, as a Conservative, is considered to have been sympathetic to the idea, especially as he was used to the system in Britain, where it was acceptable practice for an outgoing British government to nominate new members of the House of Lords. He informed Atkinson that a "little list" of nominations for the Legislative Council could be agreed upon and used "if things go wrong with you in the House or Country".

Atkinson lost ground in the election of December 1890, although it was unclear if the Liberals under Ballance would get enough support to form an administration. Rumours of the "little list" began to spread and Onslow was made aware that, even if it was common practice for an outgoing government in Britain to nominate members for the House of Lords, this was not the case in New Zealand. However, despite public opposition, Onslow followed Atkinson's recommendations and nominated six people to the council (although the number was reduced from eleven). He justified his decision to the Colonial Office in London on the basis that he could find no Royal instruction or colonial precedent for refusing Atkinson's nomination and referred to "the constant practice in England". Onslow's actions even further damaged the reputation of the council. Several independent members were pressed to support Ballance, who was able to form an administration.

In 1891 Ballance asked Onslow to nominate 18 representatives to the council in order to counterbalance Atkinson's nominations of the previous year. Onslow said he was unwilling to alter the composition of the council and replace the conservative majority with a liberal one, stating that in his view an upper house of parliament should always be conservative in its nature. He agreed to nominate eight representatives, a compromise Ballance declined. The matter was finally deferred to Onslow's successor, the Earl of Glasgow. Onslow resigned in February 1892 and returned to England.

In 1956, Onslow College, a new secondary school serving the northern suburbs of Wellington was named for the former governor.

== Political career, 1892–1911 ==
When the Conservatives returned to power in 1895 under Lord Salisbury, Onslow was made Under-Secretary of State for India, a post he retained until 1900, and was then once again Under-Secretary of State for the Colonies between 1900 and 1903 (from 1902 to 1903 under the premiership of Arthur Balfour). In 1903 he entered Balfour's cabinet as President of the Board of Agriculture and was sworn of the Privy Council the same year. He remained at the Board of Agriculture until the government fell in 1905. From 1905 to 1911 he was Lord Chairman of Committees of the House of Lords. He was also President of the Royal Statistical Society from 1905 to 1906. His death was considered a loss to the [RSPB].

== Family ==
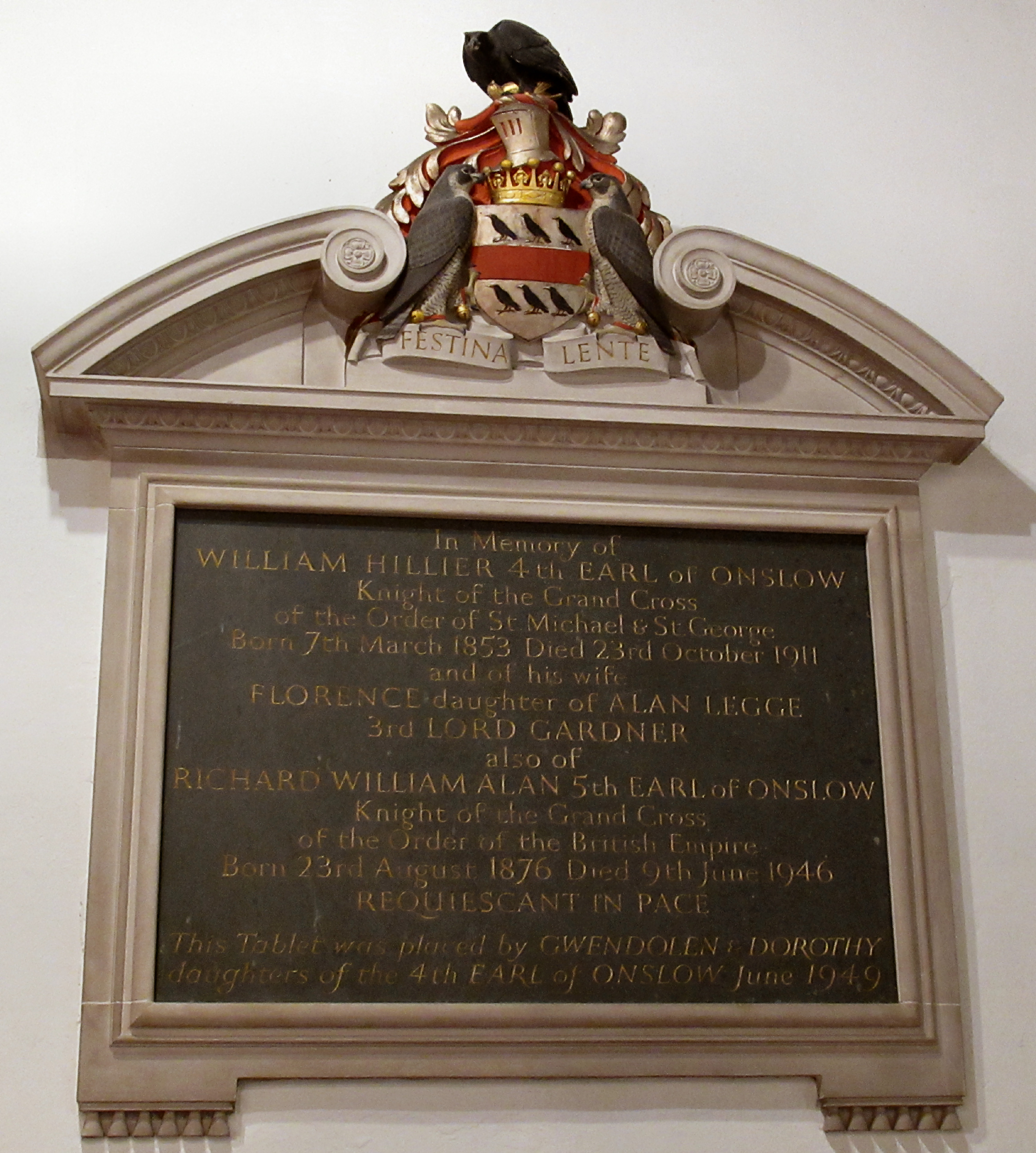
West Clandon, St Peter & St Paul Church

Lord Onslow married The Hon. Florence Coulston Gardner, daughter of Alan Gardner, 3rd Baron Gardner, in 1875. They had two sons and two daughters:

- Richard William Alan Onslow, 5th Earl of Onslow (23 August 1876 – 9 June 1945), married Violet Marcia Catherine Warwick Bampfylde, the only daughter of Coplestone Bampfylde, 3rd Baron Poltimore, on 22 February 1906.
- Lady Gwendolen Florence Mary Onslow (22 July 1881 – 16 February 1966), married Rupert Edward Cecil Lee Guinness (later Earl of Iveagh).
- Lady Dorothy Evelyn Augusta Onslow (7 February 1885 – 2 February 1976), married Edward Frederick Lindley Wood (later Baron Irwin and Earl of Halifax) on 21 September 1909.
- Victor Alexander Herbert Huia Onslow (13 November 1890 – 27 June 1922), married Muriel Wheldale on 3 February 1919. He was the first child of a governor to be born in the country; hence the Māori name Huia which was suggested by the people of Ngāti Huia. He suffered a spinal accident when he dived into an Austrian lake in the Dolomites on 16 July 1911.

Lord Onslow died at Hendon, Middlesex, in October 1911, aged 58. He was succeeded in the earldom by his elder son, Richard. The Dowager Countess of Onslow died in August 1934.

Political offices
Preceded by The Earl of Dunmore; The Earl of Roden; The Viscount Hawarden; The Lord Bagot; The Lord de Ros; The Lord Elphinstone; The Lord Henniker	Lord-in-waiting with The Earl of Dunmore; The Viscount Hawarden; The Lord Bagot; The Lord de Ros; The Lord Elphinstone; The Lord Henniker; 1880	Succeeded by The Lord Methuen; The Earl of Zetland; The Earl of Listowel; The Lord Ribblesdale; The Lord Sudeley; The Lord Wrottesley; Viscount Enfield
Preceded by The Lord Methuen; The Lord Thurlow; The Lord Camoys; The Lord Houghton; The Lord Kensington; The Lord Hothfield	Lord-in-waiting with The Earl of Limerick; The Lord Henniker; The Earl of Hopetoun; The Lord Elphinstone; The Lord de Ros; The Earl Waldegrave; 1886–1887	Succeeded by The Earl of Limerick; The Lord Henniker; The Earl of Hopetoun; The Lord Elphinstone; The Lord de Ros; The Earl Waldegrave; The Lord Balfour of Burleigh
Preceded by The Earl of Dunraven and Mount-Earl	Under-Secretary of State for the Colonies; 1887–1888	Succeeded by Baron Henry de Worms
Preceded by Baron Henry de Worms	Parliamentary Secretary to the Board of Trade; 1888–1889	Succeeded by The Lord Balfour of Burleigh
Preceded by The Lord Reay	Under-Secretary of State for India; 1895–1900	Succeeded by The Earl of Hardwicke
Preceded by The Earl of Selborne	Under-Secretary of State for the Colonies; 1900–1903	Succeeded by The Duke of Marlborough
Preceded by Robert William Hanbury	President of the Board of Agriculture; 1903–1905	Succeeded by Ailwyn Fellowes
Preceded by The Earl of Morley	Chairman of Committees of the House of Lords; 1905–1911	Succeeded by The Earl of Donoughmore
Government offices
Preceded by Sir William Jervois	Governor of New Zealand; 1889–1892	Succeeded by The Earl of Glasgow
Peerage of the United Kingdom
Preceded by Arthur Onslow	Earl of Onslow; 1870–1911	Succeeded by Richard William Alan Onslow
