= Rex Winsbury =

British writer and journalist (1935–2015)

Malcolm Rex Winsbury (6 May 1935 – 8 July 2015) was a British journalist and author. He worked for BBC current affairs, the Financial Times and Daily Telegraph, was development director for Nation Newspapers in Nairobi, Kenya, and wrote widely on the press and technology and health issues such as AIDS and cancer.

He wrote books on politics, technology, health and Roman history. His most recent and third Roman book was a biography of Pliny the Younger, covering among other things his political concerns and anxieties, his literary style and his relationship with women: Pliny the Younger: A life in Roman Letters, published in November 2013 by Bloomsbury Academic.

His first Roman history book, published by Duckworth in March 2009, was The Roman Book – Books, Publishing and Performance in Classical Rome, a literary-historical reassessment of the publishing business in classical Rome.

The second, published by Duckworth in September 2010, constructs a political and military narrative for Zenobia of Palmyra, one of the great women of classical antiquity. Winsbury argues that the romantic image of Zenobia as a beautiful, intellectual but chaste Arab queen of the desert and the political perception of her as a regal woman whose feminine qualities lifted her above her misfortunes, do less than justice to Palmyra's most controversial ruler. There was a dark side to her that shows her as a ruler who did what real rulers do and she should be judged on this.

Winsbury held an MA from Oxford University and a PhD from London University in classical studies. During his National Service, he was sent to Cambridge University to qualify as a Russian interpreter. He was the Labour candidate for Southend West in the 1964 General Election.

Winsbury died in Camden, London on 8 July 2015, at the age of 80.

== Media and technology ==
From 1959 Winsbury worked at the Financial Times and the Daily Telegraph newspapers in London, in BBC current affairs, on the monthly journal Management Today and, from 1986 to 1989, at Nation Newspapers. He was Thomson Fellow in Mass Media Studies at the University of Strathclyde in 1975–76.

He wrote a research report on the impact on the press of new electronic technologies for the UK's Royal Commission on the Press in the 1970s. In the late 1970s and early 1980s he was involved in planning the switch-over of Fleet Street from the old hot-metal technology to computer-based systems. He then became editorial director of Fintel, the joint venture between the Financial Times and Extel set up to explore the potential of two early forms of online database, Viewdata and Prestel.

He was a founder-director in 1982 of Cable London, one of the UK's first cable television companies and, in 1983 and 1984, was the founder editor of two of the first Financial Times technology newsletters, New Media Markets and Telecom Markets. From 1991 to 2007 he was editor of InterMedia, the magazine of the International Institute of Communications, based in London. He lectured on media topics at City University, London, and most recently on Roman history at Imperial College and Birkbeck College, London.

== Health-related work ==
After surviving cancer, Winsbury wrote articles about coping with cancer which were reproduced on various websites. These include What does someone dying need? which appeared on the Befriending Network and Global Ideas Bank. After working in Africa, he became editor (with Alan Whiteside) of Aids Analysis Africa, a bi-monthly report on the management of aids programmes in Africa. This was supported by the European Commission, for which he also wrote special reports, including Safe Blood in Developing Countries.

== Books and reports ==
Rex Winsbury's publications include the following:

Roman history

- The Roman Book – Books, Publishing and Performance in Classical Rome. Duckworth, March 2009, ISBN 978-0-7156-3829-3
- Zenobia of Palmyra: History, Myth and the Neo-Classical Imagination. Duckworth, September 2010, ISBN 978-0-7156-3853-8
- Pliny the Younger. Bloomsbury Academic, November 2013, ISBN 9781472514042

Politics

- Michael Stewart and Rex Winsbury, An Incomes Policy for Labour. Fabian Society, 1963
- Communism, Hamish Hamilton, 1978. ISBN 0-241-89551-0
- Trade Unionism. Hamish Hamilton, 1980. ISBN 0-241-10330-4

Media and Technology

- Government and the Press. Fabian Society, 1968. ISBN 0-7163-0379-5
- New Technology and the Press. Royal Commission on the Press, HMSO, also supported by the Acton Society Trust, 1975
- New Technology and the Journalist. Thomson Foundation, 1976
- Graham Cleverley. Preface by Rex Winsbury. The Fleet Street Disaster. Constable, Sage Publications, 1976. ISBN 0-8039-9989-5
- The Electronic Bookstall. International Institute of Communications, 1979. ISBN 0-904776-10-7
- Viewdata in Action. McGraw Hill, 1981. ISBN 0-07-084548-4)
- Daily Leader. 1984
- Convergence. Royal Television Society, 1985
- Rex Winsbury and Shehina Fazal, Vision and Hindsight – the First 25 years of the International Institute of Communications. John Libbey, 1994. ISBN 978-0-86196-449-9

Health

- Rex Winsbury, editor and contributor, Safe Blood in Developing Countries: the Lessons from Uganda. Development Studies and Research, European Commission, 1995

Business

- Thomson McLintock & Co. Thomson McLintock, 1977. ISBN 0-85422-136-0

== See also ==
- Zenobia website and blog by Judith Weingarten
- Roman Book critique, Bryn Mawr Classical Review
- Palmyrene Empire
- Odaenathus, Zenobia's husband
- Aurelian, Roman emperor
- Shapur I, Persian emperor
