= Rupert Guinness, 2nd Earl of Iveagh =

Irish businessman, politician and philanthropist (1874–1967)

The Right Honourable The Earl of Iveagh KG CB CMG VD ADC FRS DL
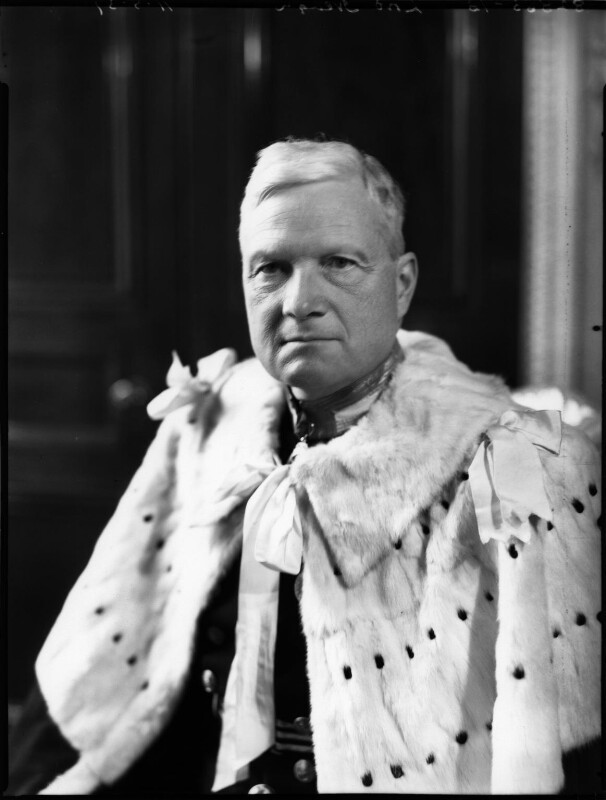
- Iveagh in 1937

Member of Parliament for Southend South East Essex (1912–1918)
- In office 16 March 1912 – 7 October 1927
- Preceded by: John Kirkwood
- Succeeded by: The Countess of Iveagh

Member of Parliament for Haggerston
- In office 1 August 1908 – 10 February 1910
- Preceded by: Randal Cremer
- Succeeded by: Henry Chancellor

Member of the House of Lords
- Lord Temporal
- In office 7 October 1927 – 14 September 1967
- Preceded by: The 1st Earl of Iveagh
- Succeeded by: The 3rd Earl of Iveagh

Personal details
- Born: Rupert Edward Cecil Lee Guinness; 29 March 1874
- Died: 14 September 1967 (aged 93)
- Spouse(s): Lady Gwendolen Onslow (m. 1903, died 1966)
- Children: Hon. Richard Guinness; Lady Honor Channon; Arthur Guinness, Viscount Elveden; Patricia Lennox-Boyd, Viscountess Boyd of Merton; Brigid, Princess Frederick of Prussia
- Parent(s): Edward Guinness, 1st Earl of Iveagh; Adelaide Guinness
- Awards: Fellow of the Royal Society

Rupert Edward Cecil Lee Guinness, 2nd Earl of Iveagh (29 March 1874 – 14 September 1967) was an Anglo-Irish businessman, politician, oarsman and philanthropist. Born in London, he was the eldest son of Edward Guinness, 1st Earl of Iveagh. He served as the 20th Chancellor of the University of Dublin from 1927 to 1963, succeeding his father who was Chancellor between 1908 and 1927.

== Biography ==
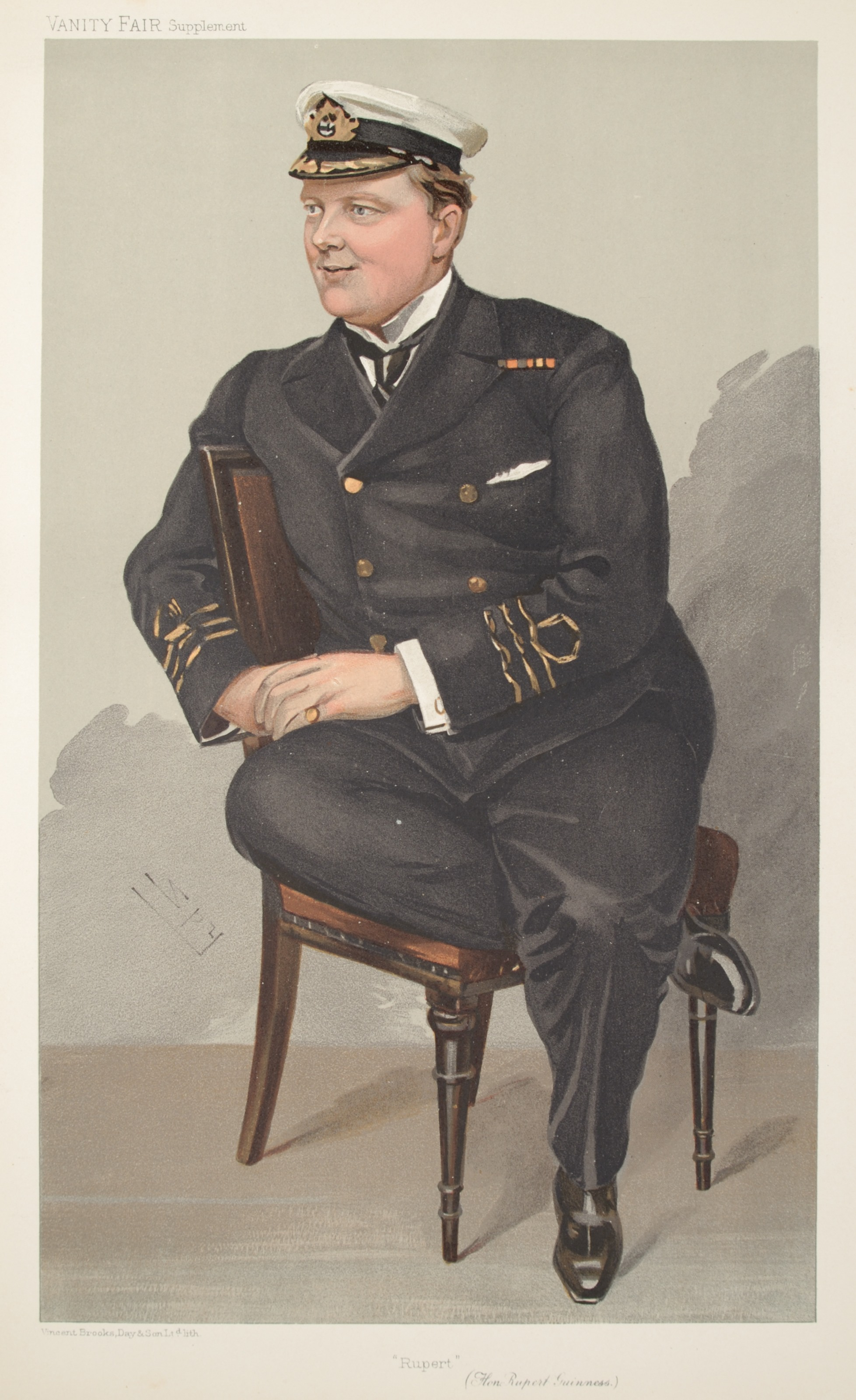
"Rupert". Caricature by Spy published in Vanity Fair in 1905

Guinness was educated at Eton College and Trinity College, Cambridge. He was a lieutenant in the 1st London Volunteer battalion, and in March 1900 volunteered for active service in South Africa during the Second Boer War, where he served with the Irish Hospital Corps. He won a seat as a Unionist MP 1908–1910 for the East End constituency of Haggerston (previously held by the Liberals) in a 1908 by-election. He lost the seat in 1910, and from 1912 to 1927 was MP for Southend. He served as a captain in the Royal Naval Volunteer Reserve and was the first commanding officer of HMS President (London Division RNVR), from 1903 until 1920. In 1927 he succeeded his father as Earl of Iveagh and chairman of the family brewing business in Dublin and for thirty-five years directed its consolidation at home and its expansion abroad with the establishment of breweries in London, Nigeria and Malaya.

A keen agriculturist, he transformed the barren, sandy-soil on the shooting estate at Elveden in Suffolk into a productive farm by ploughing in brewers' grains over decades, thereby creating humus.

Rupert had by this time established his reputation as an able politician and enthusiastic supporter of science. Lord Iveagh had earlier persuaded his father to endow the Lister Institute for Preventive Medicine and served on the governing board; he became interested in the Wright-Fleming Institute of microbiology. Rupert also helped form the Tuberculin Tested Milk Producers Association researching into the eradication of tuberculosis-infected cattle, and was instrumental in establishing the National Institute for Research into Dairying, at Shinfield, Berkshire.

In 1927 several of the most able students came from the Chadacre Agricultural Institute, to assist in the transformation of the Elveden Estate and help him with his revolutionary ideas. The brightest was a 21-year-old Victor Harrison, who arrived in 1933. Chadacre finally closed in 1989, but the Trust continues to this day, chaired by the present Lord Iveagh. Its income is used to support agricultural research work.

Lord Iveagh realised the land had to be made more profitable and manure would be needed and therefore, in 1932 he started to buy in dairy cattle, keeping only those that passed the TB Test. In 1927 there were 120 cows, by 1962 there were 715 plus 816 young stock. Lord and Lady Iveagh took a keen interest in their Dairy Herds and prepared a 'family tree', which was regularly up dated, for every animal in their possession.

He donated generous sums to Dublin hospitals and in 1939 presented to the Government his Dublin residence, Iveagh House (80 St Stephen's Green), now the Department of Foreign Affairs and Trade, and gave the gardens to UCD.

=== World War II ===
At the outbreak of war the Ministry of Agriculture instigated a ploughing-up campaign as part of the 'War Effort'. Lord Iveagh agreed to increase the arable area as requested. 600 acres (2.4 km^{2}) were ploughed, 200 acres (0.8 km^{2}) of which were Lucerne leys, and the rest old lands that had been used for game and had gone out of cultivation. This proved discouraging, crops failing to cover the expense of growing them. The following year Lord Iveagh was asked to plough another 1000 acres (4 km^{2}) and agreed to make the attempt even though the previous efforts had proved unsuccessful. All had to be fenced against rabbits and the wire was difficult to obtain.

The new ground yielded more crops than anticipated, but later the whole project was dealt a severe blow. The War Office announced its intention of using a large area of the estate as a tank training ground and despite the need for food production, many of the new crops were ruined, and fences torn down, allowing the ingress of rabbits, which were more destructive than the tanks. After a great deal of damage had been done, it was agreed to fence off small areas of the land for cultivation. The value of the ploughing-up experiment had been largely lost and an enormous amount of much needed food had gone to waste. Undeterred, Lord Iveagh obtained permission from the War Office to cultivate portions of the requisitioned lands that were hardly used and by the end of the war had regained much of the lost ground – which was successfully cropped. Leys had also been increased by another 1000 acres (4 km^{2}). Some of the extra area had been obtained from old pasture land but most of it was gained from previously untouched heath.

His only son, Arthur Onslow Edward Guinness, Viscount Elveden, was killed in action in Belgium in 1945, being an unlucky victim of a V-2 rocket strike.

=== Post-war ===
For several years the Forestry Commission had coveted parts of Elveden Estate for extending Thetford Forest, but Lord Iveagh's success with farming brought a settlement in his favour in 1952.

It was during Rupert's management that the Guinness World Records started. The brewery was always on the look-out for good promotional ideas to bring the Guinness name to the public's attention. One of these ideas came about when Sir Hugh Beaver, then the managing director, went on a shooting party in 1951. He became involved in an argument about which was the fastest game bird in Europe, the golden plover or the grouse, and he realised that a book, published by Guinness, that supplied answers to this sort of question might prove popular. Sir Hugh's idea became reality when the McWhirter twins, Norris and Ross, who had been running a fact-finding agency in London, were commissioned to compile what became the Guinness Book of Records. The first edition was published in 1955 and went to the top of the British best-seller lists by Christmas that same year. Since then Guinness World Records has become a household name and the book has sold more than 80 million copies in 77 different countries and 38 different languages. It has also prompted successful television shows around the world, and the launch of the guinnessworldrecords.com website in the year 2000.

Rupert became a Knight Companion of the Order of the Garter in 1955.

He retired from Guinness in 1962 in favour of his grandson, Lord Elveden and was elected FRS in March 1964 at ninety for his services to science and agriculture. Lord Iveagh died in his sleep at his house in Woking, Surrey, 14 September 1967.

=== Family ===
He was married to Lady Gwendolen Onslow, (daughter of the William Onslow, 4th Earl of Onslow) who succeeded him as Member of Parliament for Southend-on-Sea. They had five children:

1. Richard Guinness (15 October 1906 – 17 October 1906)
2. Lady Honor Dorothy Mary Guinness (1909 – 2 November 1976) she married Sir Henry Channon on 14 July 1933 and they were divorced in 1945. They have one son. She remarried F/Lt. Frantisek Svejdar on 19 November 1946.
  - Henry Paul Guinness Channon, Baron Kelvedon (9 October 1935 – 27 January 2007) he married Ingrid Wyndham on 7 August 1963. They have three children.
3. Arthur Guinness, Viscount Elveden (8 May 1912 – 8 February 1945) he married Lady Elizabeth Hare on 22 July 1936. They have three children, nine grandchildren and nine great-grandchildren:
  - Benjamin Guinness, 3rd Earl of Iveagh (20 May 1937 – 18 June 1992) he married Miranda Smiley on 12 March 1963 and they were divorced in 1984. They have four children and nine grandchildren:
    - Lady Emma Lavinia Guinness (7 December 1963) she married James Barnard on 4 December 1995. They have two sons:
      - Benjamin Philip Barnard (23 October 1996)
      - Arthur James Barnard (8 March 1998)
    - Lady Louisa Jane Guinness (20 February 1967) she married Rupert Uloth in 2001. They have three children:
      - Honor Miranda Uloth (12 February 2001 – 31 July 2020)
      - Nonie Margaret Uloth (4 March 2003)
      - Rufus Benjamin Uloth (22 March 2005)
    - Edward Guinness, 4th Earl of Iveagh (10 August 1969) he married Clare Hazell on 27 October 2001. They have one son:
      - Arthur Benjamin Geoffrey Guinness, Viscount Elveden (6 January 2003)
    - Hon. Rory Michael Benjamin Guinness (12 December 1974) he married Mira Maini in 2006. They have three children:
      - Aoife Maya Theadora Guinness (8 May 2006)
      - Beatrice Miranda Margareta Guinness (31 January 2008)
      - Aidan Tidu Benjamin Guinness (29 October 2013)
  - Lady Elizabeth Maria Guinness (31 October 1939) she married David Nugent on 28 September 1960 and they were divorced in 1990. They have four children. She remarried Robert Mays-Smith on 7 February 1992
  - Lady Henrietta Guinness (19 August 1942 – 3 May 1978) she married Luigi Marinori on 3 February 1978. They have one daughter:
    - Sara Marinori (1977)
4. Lady Patricia Florence Susan Guinness (3 March 1918 – 14 May 2001) she married 1st Viscount Boyd of Merton on 29 December 1938.
5. Lady Brigid Katherine Rachel Guinness (30 July 1920 – 8 March 1995) she married Prince Frederick of Prussia on 30 July 1945. They have five children, fifteen grandchildren and seven great-grandchildren. She remarried Major Anthony Patrick Ness on 3 June 1967.

=== Rowing ===
Rupert Guinness began rowing at Eton; he won the School Sculls 1892 and was part of the Eton eight which won the Ladies' Challenge Plate at Henley Royal Regatta in 1893. At Cambridge, he joined Third Trinity Boat Club but, according to Vanity Fair's pen picture of him, "had the bad luck to develop a weakness of heart, which kept him from his place in the Cambridge eight."

While an undergraduate, he joined Thames Rowing Club to have a London base to train with Bill East, the 1891 English professional sculling champion.

Helped by coaching from East, he became a successful sculler, joined Leander Club and won the Diamond Challenge Sculls at Henley in 1895 and 1896, as well as the Wingfield Sculls, for the Amateur Sculling Championship of the Thames and Great Britain, in 1896. The sculling boat in which he did so now hangs in the River & Rowing Museum in Henley-on-Thames.

He was President of Thames Rowing Club from 1911 until his death and was also the first President of the Remenham Club, from 1914 until 1938. He was also President of Dublin University Boat Club from 1949 until 1967.

In June 1902 he was on board German torpedo boat S. 42 when it sank off Cuxhaven, after it was accidentally run over by the steam ship SS Frisby. Guinness had been granted passage in the torpedo boat from Heligoland to Cuxhaven, returning from the Dover to Heligoland yacht race, and survived unharmed, though the captain and several German crew members drowned.

== Arms ==
Coat of arms of Rupert Guinness, 2nd Earl of Iveagh
Coronet A Coronet of an Earl Crest 1st: A Boar passant quarterly Or and Gules; 2nd: On a Pillar Argent encircled by a Ducal Coronet Or an Eagle preying on a Bird's Leg erased proper Escutcheon Quarterly: 1st and 4th, Per saltire Gules and Azure a Lion rampant Or on a Chief Ermine a Dexter Hand couped at the wrist of the first (Guinness); 2nd and 3rd, Argent on a Fess between three Crescents Sable a Trefoil slipped Or (Lee) Supporters On either side a Stag Gules collared gemel and attired Or each resting a hind hoof upon an Escutcheon Vert charged with a Lion rampant Or Motto Spes Mea In Deo (My hope is in God)

Parliament of the United Kingdom
Preceded by Sir Randal Cremer	Member of Parliament for Haggerston; 1908 – Jan. 1910	Succeeded by Henry Chancellor
Preceded by John Hendley Morrison Kirkwood	Member of Parliament for South East Essex; 1912 – 1918	Succeeded by Frank Hilder
New constituency	Member of Parliament for Southend; 1918 – 1927	Succeeded by The Countess of Iveagh
Academic offices
Preceded by 1st Earl of Iveagh	Chancellor of the University of Dublin; 1927–1963	Succeeded by Frederick Boland
Peerage of the United Kingdom
Preceded by Edward Guinness	Earl of Iveagh; 1927–1967	Succeeded by Benjamin Guinness
