= Gwendolen Guinness, Countess of Iveagh =

Anglo-Irish aristocrat and politician (1881–1966)

The Right Honourable The Countess of Iveagh
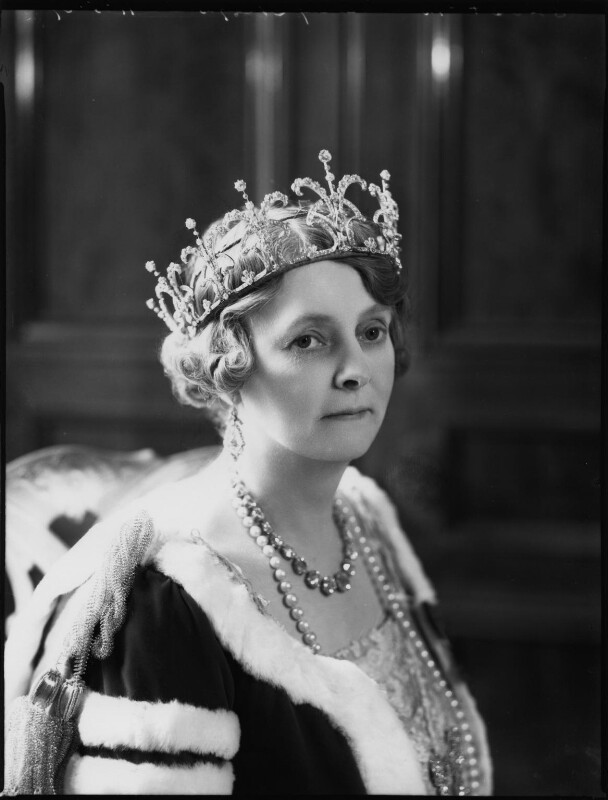
- Iveagh in 1937

Member of Parliament for Southend
- In office 19 November 1927 – 13 November 1935
- Preceded by: Viscount Elveden
- Succeeded by: Henry Channon

Personal details
- Born: Gwendolen Florence Mary Onslow; 22 July 1881
- Died: 16 February 1966 (aged 84)
- Party: Conservative
- Spouse: Rupert Guinness, 2nd Earl of Iveagh
- Children: Hon. Richard Guinness; Lady Honor Channon; Arthur Guinness, Viscount Elveden; Patricia Lennox-Boyd, Viscountess Boyd of Merton; Brigid, Princess Frederick of Prussia
- Parent(s): William Onslow, 4th Earl of Onslow; Florence Gardner

Gwendolen Florence Mary Guinness, Countess of Iveagh (née Onslow; 22 July 1881 – 16 February 1966) was an Anglo-Irish aristocrat and Conservative politician. She was, by marriage, a member of the Guinness brewing dynasty.

== Early life ==
She was the daughter of William Hillier Onslow, 4th Earl of Onslow (1853–1911), and Florence Coulston Onslow, née Gardner (1853–1934).

== Marriage and career ==
She was married to the Conservative Member of Parliament (MP) for Southend, Rupert Guinness, 2nd Earl of Iveagh. In 1927, he ceased to be an MP when he succeeded to his father's earldom. The Countess of Iveagh, as Gwendolen Guinness was now known, won the Southend by-election on 19 November 1927 to replace her husband as MP. She received 54.6% of the vote at that election and increased it at the 1931 general election. She served until her retirement at the 1935 general election.

When she retired in 1935, she was succeeded as MP by Henry "Chips" Channon, the husband of her eldest daughter, Honor Guinness. Another son-in-law, Alan Lennox-Boyd, was an MP (for Mid Bedfordshire 1931–60, and thus became, with Gwendolen, the first mother- and son-in-law pair of MPs.

== Clandon Park House ==
In 1956 she presented her Surrey childhood home, Clandon Park House, to the National Trust.

== Titles ==
- 1881 – 1903: The Lady Gwendolen Florence Mary Onslow
- 1903 – 1919: The Lady Gwendolyn Guinness
- 1919 – 1927: Viscountess Elveden
- 1927 – 1966: The Right Honourable The Countess of Iveagh

== Sources ==
- Martin Pugh, "Guinness, Gwendolen Florence Mary, countess of Iveagh (1881–1966)", Oxford Dictionary of National Biography, Oxford University Press, 2004 accessed 27 May 2007

Parliament of the United Kingdom
Preceded by Viscount Elveden	Member of Parliament for Southend; 1927–1935	Succeeded by Henry Channon
