= Baron Meston =

Barony in the Peerage of the United Kingdom

Baron Meston, of Agra in the Indian Empire and Dunnottar in the County of Kincardine, is a title in the Peerage of the United Kingdom. It was created on 29 December 1919 for the Indian civil servant and former Lieutenant-Governor of the United Provinces of Agra and Oudh, Sir James Meston. As of 2023 the title is held by his grandson, the third Baron, who succeeded his father in 1984 and, having been excluded by the House of Lords Act 1999, was elected to return to the House in 2023. He is a barrister and judge.

== Barons Meston (1919) ==
- James Scorgie Meston, 1st Baron Meston (1865–1943)
- Dougall Meston, 2nd Baron Meston (1894–1984)
- James Meston, 3rd Baron Meston (b. 1950)

The heir apparent is the present holder's son, the Hon. Thomas James Dougall Meston (b. 1977).

== Arms ==
Coat of arms of Baron Meston

Crest
An angel Proper habited Argent holding in the dexter hand an Eastern crown as in the arms.
Escutcheon
Argent a palm tree eradicated Proper on a chief Azure an Eastern crown between two thistles slipped and leaved Or.
Supporters
Dexter a demoiselle crane Proper sinister a stag also Proper charged on the shoulder with a saltire Argent.
Motto
In Deo Fides (In God Is My Trust)
