= 1959 Southend West by-election =

UK Parliamentary by-election

The 1959 Southend West by-election of 29 January 1959 was held following the death of Conservative Party MP and renowned diarist Henry Channon. The Conservative Party held the seat.

== Electoral history ==
The seat was very safe, having been won at the 1955 general election by almost 18,500 votes

General election 1955: Southend West
Party	Candidate	Votes	%	±%
Conservative	Henry Channon	27,326	64.2	−4.9
Labour	VG Marchesi	8,866	20.8	−10.1
Liberal	Heather Harvey	6,375	15.0	N/A
Majority		18,460	43.4	+5.2
Turnout		42,567	74.1	−4.9
Conservative hold		Swing		

== Candidates ==
- 23-year old Paul Channon was selected by the Conservatives following the death of his father, Sir Henry Channon. A company director. Born October, 1935; educated at Lockers Park, Hemel Hempstead, Eton, and Christ Church, Oxford.
- Labour's candidate was 35-year old Anthony Pearson-Clarke, a deputy headmaster. Born November, 1923; educated at St. Luke's College School and Training College, Exeter, Battersea Polytechnic, and Ruskin College, Oxford. A former weekly newspaper editor and local government officer.
- The Liberal Party selected 59-year old Miss Heather Joan Harvey. She had contested the division in 1955 and Esher in 1950 and 1951. She was a writer and was engaged in historical research. She was educated privately at Prior's Field School, Godalming, and Newnham College, Cambridge, where she graduated in 1921 with first-class honours, economics tripos. She joined the Royal Institute of International Affairs, Chatham House, in 1931. She became secretary of the Study Groups Department in 1935. She was a temporary Civil servant in the Foreign Office, 1939–45. She served with the United Nations 1945-46 as deputy administrative secretary. She was Hon. treasurer, Women's Liberal Federation, a member of Liberal Party Organization Council and executive committee. She was Joint honorary treasurer of the Liberal Party organization.

== Result ==
Southend West by-election, 1959
Party	Candidate	Votes	%	±%
Conservative	Paul Channon	14,493	55.6	−8.6
Liberal	Heather Harvey	6,314	24.2	+9.2
Labour	Anthony Pearson-Clarke	5,280	20.2	−0.6
Majority		5,166	31.4	−12.0
Turnout		26,087		
Conservative hold		Swing		

== Aftermath ==
General election 1959: Southend West
Party	Candidate	Votes	%	±%
Conservative	Paul Channon	27,612	58.2	−6.0
Liberal	Heather Harvey	10,577	22.3	+7.3
Labour	Anthony Pearson-Clarke	9,219	19.4	−1.4
Majority		17,035	35.9	−7.7
Turnout		47,408	77.7	+3.6
Conservative hold		Swing		
