= 1908 Haggerston by-election =

UK parliamentary by-election

← 1906	1 August 1908	Jan. 1910 →

Candidate	Guinness	Warren	Burrows
Party	Conservative	Liberal	Social Democratic Federation
Popular vote	2,867	1,724	986
Percentage	51.4%	30.9%	17.7%
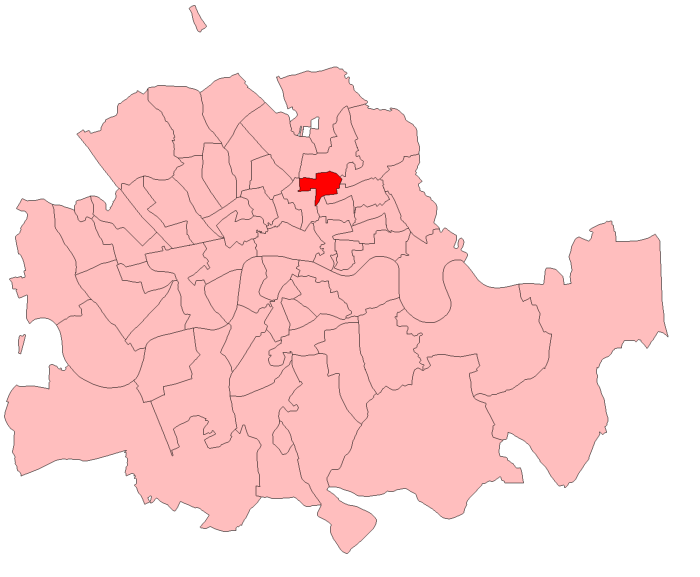
MP before election
Randal Cremer
Liberal
Subsequent MP
Henry Chancellor
Liberal

The 1908 Haggerston by-election was a Parliamentary by-election held on 1 August 1908. The constituency returned one Member of Parliament (MP) to the House of Commons of the United Kingdom, elected by the first past the post voting system.

== Vacancy ==
Sir Randal Cremer the sitting member died on 22 July 1908. He had been Liberal MP for the seat of Haggerston since the 1900 general election.

== Electoral history ==
The seat had been Liberal since they gained it in 1900. They easily held the seat at the last election, with an increased majority;

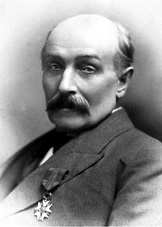
Cremer

General election 1906: Shoreditch, Haggerston
Party	Candidate	Votes	%	±%
Lib-Lab	Randal Cremer	2,772	53.9	+3.6
Conservative	Rupert Guinness	2,371	46.1	−3.6
Majority		401	7.8	+7.2
Turnout		6,403	80.3	+13.1
Lib-Lab hold		Swing	+3.6	

No Labour Party or Socialist candidate had ever stood. At the 1907 London County Council election The Conservative backed Municipal Reform Party had gained Haggerston from the Liberal backed Progressive Party.

== Candidates ==
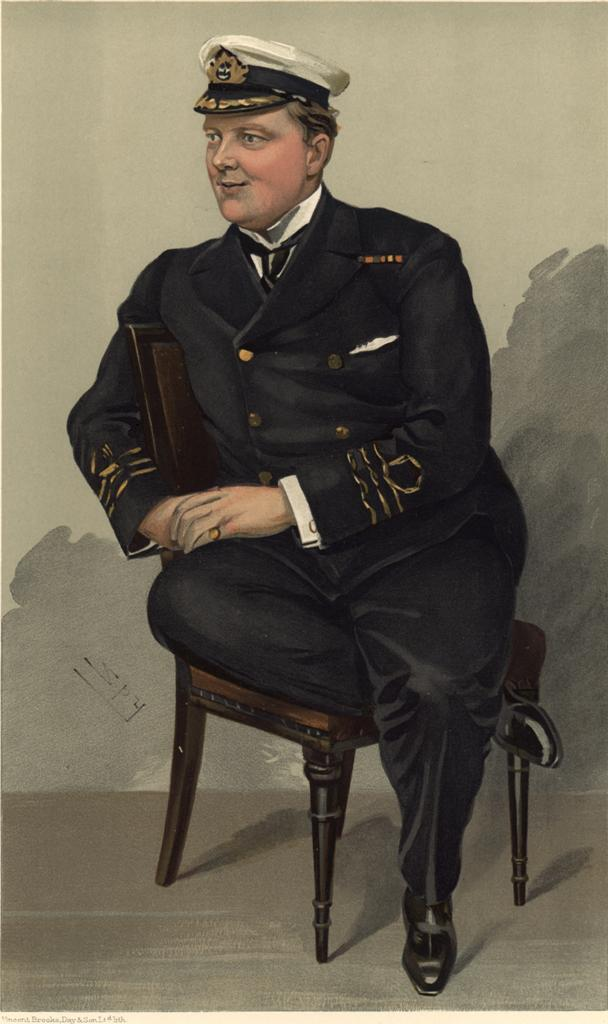
Guinness

- The local Liberal Association selected Walter Richard Warren to defend the seat. He was standing for parliament for the first time.
- The Conservatives retained 34-year-old Hon. Rupert Guinness as their candidate. He served as a captain in the Royal Naval Volunteer Reserve and was commanding officer of HMS President (London Division RNVR) from 1903. He was standing for parliament for the second time, having lost here in 1906. However, in 1907 he experienced electoral success in Haggerston when he was one of the two Municipal Reform candidates elected to serve on the London County Council
- The Socialist Social Democratic Federation chose to intervene in the by-election, and fielded Herbert Burrows a 63-year-old former civil servant from Suffolk, one of the organisers of the Matchgirls Strike. He was standing for parliament for the first time.

== Campaign ==
Polling Day was fixed for 1 August 1908.

== Result ==
The Conservatives gained the seat on a swing of 10.25%;

1908 Haggerston by-election
Party	Candidate	Votes	%	±%
Conservative	Rupert Guinness	2,867	51.4	+5.3
Liberal	Walter Richard Warren	1,724	30.9	−23.0
Social Democratic Federation	Herbert Burrows	986	17.7	New
Majority		1,143	20.5	N/A
Turnout		5,577	65.9	−14.4
Conservative gain from Liberal		Swing	+10.25	

The result was seen as a victory for Tariff Reform and a disappointment to the third party Social Democratic Federation.

== Aftermath ==
Warren sought election to parliament at the next general election at the Conservative seat of Wandsworth, without success. Guinness once again faced Burrows and a new Liberal candidate who defeated him;

General election January 1910: Shoreditch, Haggerston
Party	Candidate	Votes	%	±%
Liberal	Henry Chancellor	3,041	48.0	+17.1
Conservative	Rupert Guinness	2,586	40.9	−10.5
Social Democratic Federation	Herbert Burrows	701	11.1	−6.6
Majority		455	7.1	N/A
Turnout		6,328		
Liberal gain from Conservative		Swing	+13.8	

Warren switched his attention to municipal politics and in March 1910, standing for the Liberal backed Progressive Party, he gained a seat from the Conservative backed Municipal Reform Party at Battersea in the 1910 London County Council election.
