= Henry Chancellor =

Henry Chancellor may refer to:

- Henry Chancellor (politician) (1863–1945), radical British Liberal Party politician
- Henry Chancellor (filmmaker) (born 1968), British television director, producer, and writer
