= John Lowles =

British politician

Lowles in 1895.

John Lowles (1850 – 1903) was a British businessman and Conservative Party politician.

The son of George Lowles of Frant, near Tunbridge Wells, Kent, he entered business as a wholesale tea merchant. He married his cousin, Agnes Westoby, in 1871 and was living in Stamford Hill in north London by 1880 having become a leading member of the Hackney Conservative Club. In 1882, he unsuccessfully stood for election to the London School Board. He became President of the Hackney Conservative Union, representing the party at meetings with the boundary commissioners appointed under the Redistribution of Seats Act 1885.

When the first elections to the London County Council were held in January 1889, Lowles was nominated by the Conservatives to contest the Hackney Central Division. He was elected, serving three years as a member of the Conservative-backed Moderate Party that formed the opposition group. He was defeated at the next council elections in 1892, when the Liberal-backed Progressive Party increased the size of its majority.

At the 1895 general election, Lowles stood for election to the House of Commons as Conservative candidate at Shoreditch, Haggerston. He unseated the sitting Liberal Party Member of Parliament, Randal Cremer by the small majority of 31 votes. Cremer submitted an election petition to overturn the result, but following a recount Lowles was confirmed elected with an increased majority of 40 votes. Cremer returned to the courts alleging that Lowles was guilty of "treating", but his second petition was dismissed in February 1896. When the next general election was held in 1900, Cremer regained the Haggerston seat by a majority of 34 votes. Lowles promptly issued legal proceedings against Cremer for libel over statements made during the campaign, and was awarded damages of £750 in June 1901.

Parliament of the United Kingdom
| Preceded by Randal Cremer | Member of Parliament for Haggerston; 1895–1900 | Succeeded by Randal Cremer |
