= Herbert Burrows =

British socialist activist (1845–1922)

- Born: 12 June 1845; Redgrave, Suffolk, England
- Died: 14 December 1922 (aged 77); Highbury Park, London, England
- Occupation: Socialist organiser
- Organization(s): Aristotelian Society; National Secular Society; The Rainbow Circle; Conway Hall Ethical Society; Theosophical Society
- Political party: Manhood Suffrage League; Social Democratic Federation
- Movement: Socialism; trade unionism; secularism; theosophy
- Spouse: Mary Hannah (m. 1869)
- Father: Amos Burrows (chartist organiser)

Herbert Burrows (12 June 1845 – 14 December 1922) was a British socialist activist.

== Early life ==
Born in Redgrave, Suffolk, Burrows' father Amos was a former Chartist leader. Burrows educated himself using Cassell's shilling handbooks, becoming a pupil teacher at the age of thirteen; he initially pursued a career in teaching before becoming an excise officer. In 1869, he married Mary Hannah Musk (1845–1889). The couple had a daughter and a son.

From 1872, Burrows studied briefly as a non-collegiate student at the University of Cambridge, but did not take a degree. He worked as a civil servant for the Inland Revenue, including in Norwich, Barnet, Blackburn, and Chatham, a career that lasted until his retirement in 1907.

== Activism ==
Burrows moved to London in 1877, where he joined radical clubs including the National Secular Society. He was a founder member of the Aristotelian Society in 1880, joined the Social and Political Education League and became Vice President of the Manhood Suffrage League. In 1881, with Henry Hyndman, he formed the Democratic Federation, and became its treasurer in 1883.

Burrows supported the Federation's commitment to socialism in 1884, when it was renamed the Social Democratic Federation (SDF). Often writing under the pseudonym C.V., he contributed articles to its newspaper, Justice. He represented the group on the executive of the Law and Liberty League.

With Annie Besant—whom he had met through his connection with Bradlaugh and the National Secular Society—Burrows was a key organiser of the Bryant & May matchgirls' strike of 1888, and afterwards became the treasurer of the Union of Women Matchmakers, then the largest women's trade union in England. Burrows actively promoted unionisation among workers, and the success of the matchgirls' strike helped to galvanise the trade union movement. He maintained an active role in the Women's Trade Union League and the Women's Industrial Council until 1917.

Burrows also became a prominent member of South Place Ethical Society, the Rainbow Circle, the Theosophical Society, the International Arbitration and Peace Association and the International Arbitration League. From 1907 until 1922, Burrows was Appointed Lecturer to the South Place Ethical Society, now Conway Hall Ethical Society. Burrows served on the Humanitarian League's Executive Committee. He was a teetotaller, vegetarian, and lifelong pacifist.

Burrows stood for Parliament unsuccessfully in the 1908 Haggerston by-election, and again in Haggerston in 1910. He resigned from the SDF (then the Social Democratic Party) in 1911.

== Death ==
Afflicted by paralysis from 1917, Burrows died at his home in Highbury Park, London on 14 December 1922.
