= Olney–Pauncefote Treaty =

The Olney–Pauncefote Treaty of 1897 was a proposed treaty between the United States and Britain in 1897 that would have required arbitration of major disputes. The treaty was rejected by the US Senate and never went into effect.

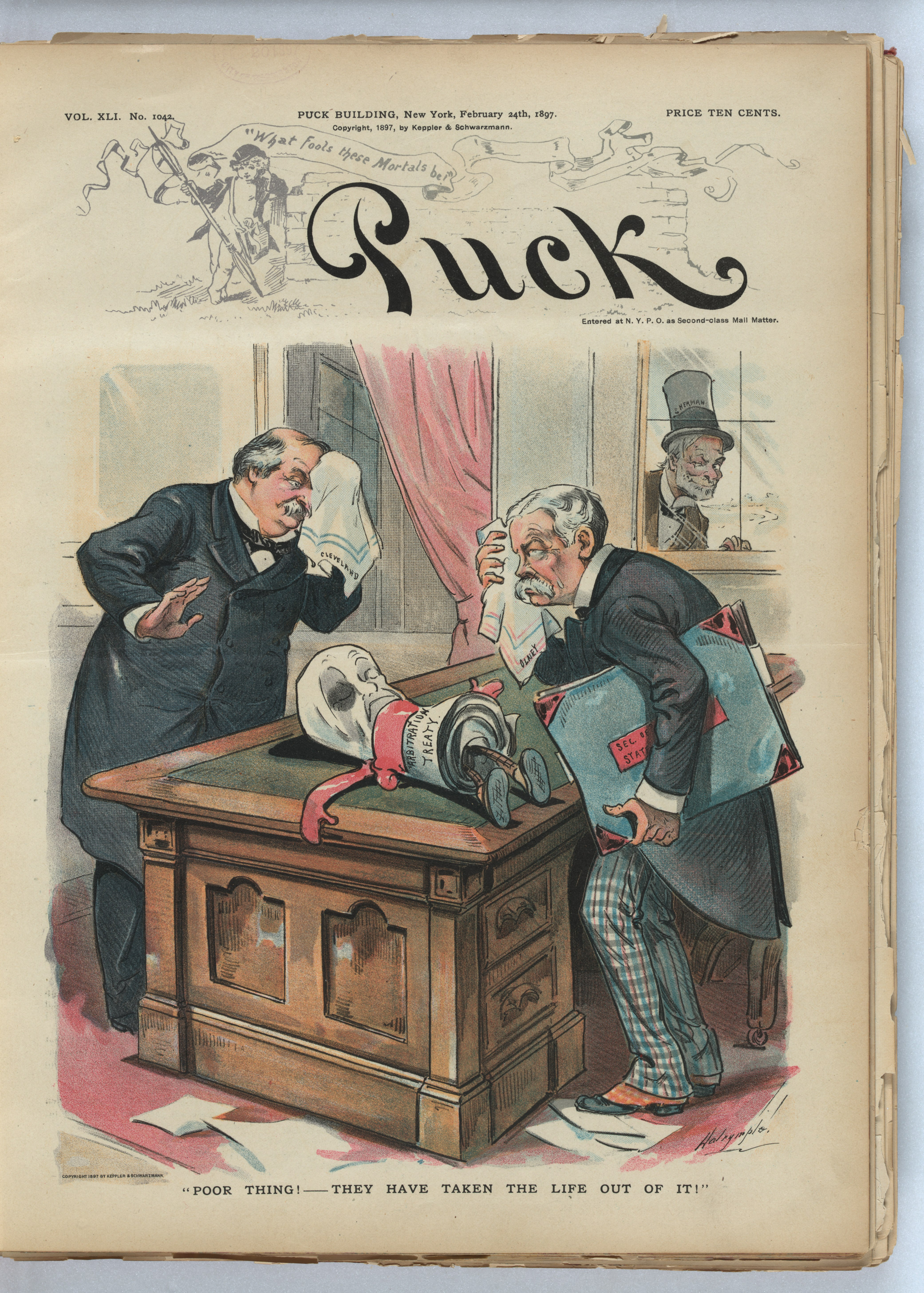
February 1897 cartoon by Louis Dalrymple depicts President Cleveland and Secretary of State Olney mourning the treaty as then Chair of the Senate Foreign Relations Committee John Sherman winks from outside a window

The Venezuelan crisis of 1895 was peacefully resolved through arbitration. Both nations realized that a mechanism was desirable to avoid possible future conflicts. In January 1897, US Secretary of State Richard Olney negotiated an arbitration treaty with the British diplomat Julian Pauncefote. US President Grover Cleveland and his successor William McKinley both supported the treaty, as did most opinion leaders, academics, and leading newspapers. In Britain, it was promoted by pacifist Liberal MP for Haggerston Randal Cremer; the main opposition came from Irish-Americans, who held a very negative view of Britain because of its treatment of Ireland.

The US Senate, however, passed a series of amendments that exempted important issues from any sort of arbitration. Any issue that was not exempted would need a two-thirds vote of the Senate before arbitration could begin. Virtually nothing was left of the original proposal, and in May 1897, the Senate voted 43 in favor to 26 opposed, three votes short of the two-thirds majority needed. The Senate was jealous of its control over treaties and was susceptible to a certain deep-rooted Anglophobia.
