= Randal Cremer =

English politician (1828–1908)

Sir Randal Cremer
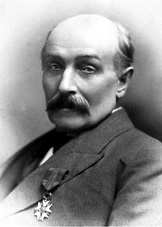

Member of Parliament for Haggerston
- In office 24 October 1900 – 22 July 1908
- Preceded by: John Lowles
- Succeeded by: Rupert Guinness
- In office 18 December 1885 – 13 July 1895
- Succeeded by: John Lowles

Personal details
- Born: 18 March 1828 Fareham, Hampshire, England
- Died: 22 July 1908 (aged 80) Haggerston, London, England
- Party: Liberal
- Awards: Nobel Peace Prize; Knight of the Order of St. Olav; Chevalier of the Legion of Honour; Knight Bachelor

Sir William Randal Cremer (18 March 1828 – 22 July 1908) usually known by his middle name "Randal", was a British Liberal Member of Parliament, a pacifist, and a leading advocate for international arbitration. He was awarded the Nobel Peace Prize in 1903 for his work with the international arbitration movement.

== Early life ==
Cremer was born to a working-class family in the southern English town of Fareham. His father was a coachman, who abandoned the family soon after Randal Cremer was born. His mother raised him along with his two sisters, ensuring he received an education at a local Methodist school. He augmented his knowledge by attending free lectures, was apprenticed as a builder and became a skilled carpenter.

Moving to London 1852, Cremer became active as a union organiser, swiftly becoming a recognized labour leader. Cremer was elected as the Secretary of the International Workingmen's Association in 1865 but resigned two years later in 1867, when the organization decided to make women eligible for membership. Being strongly opposed to women's suffrage, Cremer might have now felt that the organisation was becoming too radical. While heavily involved in campaigning for progressive causes and respected by Karl Marx, Cremer did not agree with a worker-led revolution.

== Role in the international arbitration movement ==
From as early as his first unsuccessful run for Parliament in 1868, Cremer had advocated the expansion of international arbitration as peaceful alternative to war for the resolution of disputes.

He was elected as Liberal Member of Parliament (MP) for Haggerston in the Metropolitan Borough of Shoreditch from 1885 to 1895, and then from 1900 until his death from pneumonia in 1908.

Using his platform as an MP, Cremer cultivated allies on both continental Europe and across the Atlantic, including Frédéric Passy, William Jennings Bryan and Andrew Carnegie. Using his network of contacts and his talent for organisation, Cremer did much to create and expand institutions for international arbitration, which during his lifetime were successful in peacefully resolving numerous international disputes. This work includes co-founding the Inter-Parliamentary Union and the International Arbitration League; gaining acceptance for the 1897 Olney–Pauncefote Treaty between the United States and Britain that would have required arbitration of major disputes as the Essequibo territory (the treaty was rejected by the US Senate and never went into effect); and preparing the ground for the Hague peace conferences of 1899 and 1907.

In recognition of his work in the arbitration movement, Cremer won the Nobel Peace Prize, the first to do so solo, in 1903. Of the £8,000 award he donated £7,000 as an endowment for the International Arbitration League.

He also was named a Chevalier of the French Légion d'honneur, won the Norwegian Knighthood of Saint Olaf and was knighted in 1907.

Randal Cremer Primary School, in Haggerston, is named in his honour.

== Death ==
Cremer died on 22 July 1908, leaving an estate of £2,241 (£1,803 net). Cremer's Nobel Prize medal was sold at auction at Sotheby's in London in November 1985 for $16,750 (equivalent to $50,141 in 2025)

== See also ==
- List of peace activists

== Notes ==
Political offices
Preceded by New position	General Secretary of the International Workingmen's Association; 1864–1866	Succeeded by Peter Fox
Preceded by Peter Fox	General Secretary of the International Workingmen's Association; 1866–1867	Succeeded by Johann Eccarius
Parliament of the United Kingdom
New constituency	Member of Parliament for Haggerston; 1885–1895	Succeeded by John Lowles
Preceded by John Lowles	Member of Parliament for Haggerston; 1900–1908	Succeeded by Rupert Guinness, Viscount Elveden
