= The Rainbow Circle =

Political group based in London

The Rainbow Circle was a political group consisting of Liberals, Fabians and socialists who first began to meet in 1893 in London to consider if it was possible to resolve the relationship between the various progressive forces they represented to advance the cause of political, industrial and social reform in a consistent and coherent programme. In 1894, they were meeting regularly at the Rainbow Tavern in Fleet Street from which the group took its name. However, in 1896, it moved its gatherings to a member's house in Bloomsbury Square but retained the name Rainbow Circle.

According to one source, the group continued to meet until 1931. but the archives at the British Library of Political and Economic Science indicate there are papers going as late as 1966. The circle's heyday, however was the early years, before the formation of the Labour Representation Committee in 1900 and that organisation's journey to become the Labour Party.

Amongst the leading figures in the group were Charles Trevelyan, Herbert Samuel, J. A. Hobson and Ramsay MacDonald.
