= Henry Chancellor (politician) =

British Liberal Party politician

Henry Chancellor

Henry George Chancellor (3 June 1863 – 14 March 1945), was a radical British Liberal Party politician.

== Background ==
Chancellor was the son of John Chancellor of Walton and Louisa Porter of Ashcott. He was educated at Elmfield College, York. In 1885 he married Mary Dyer Surl of Newent, Gloucester. They had one son and three daughters.

== Career ==
=== Media ===
Chancellor ran the newspaper, The Londoner, from 1896 to 1899. The paper was progressive in its outlook.

=== Activism ===
Chancellor was a critic of vivisection and vaccination. He served as chairman of the National Society for the Abolition of Cruel Sports.

=== Politics ===
Around 1885 Chancellor became involved in politics. He was active for both the Liberal Party and at municipal level for their sister party, the Progressive Party. He was also in active in the Peace and Temperance movements. In 1895 he became President of the North Islington Liberal Association. He was a Progressive Party candidate for the North division of Islington at the 1907 London County Council Election.

Chancellor was elected in January 1910 as the Liberal MP for the Haggerston Division of Shoreditch. He gained the seat from the sitting Conservative MP, despite the presence of a socialist candidate.

He was actively involved in the English League for the Taxation of Land Values, serving as President in 1910 and 1920.

By 1918 he was clearly identified with a group of Liberals who wished to see the party co-operate closely with the Labour Party and was one of the founders of a "Radical Committee".

He held Haggerston until the constituency was merged in 1918 into the new Division of Shoreditch. At the subsequent general election he stood as the (Asquith) Liberal candidate in competition with the Liberal Christopher Addison who had represented the Hoxton part of the new constituency. Addison, who was a supporter of Lloyd George, received the 'coupon' defeated Chancellor. He did not stand for parliament again.

In 1938 he was Honorary Secretary of the pacifist International Arbitration League.

==== Electoral record ====
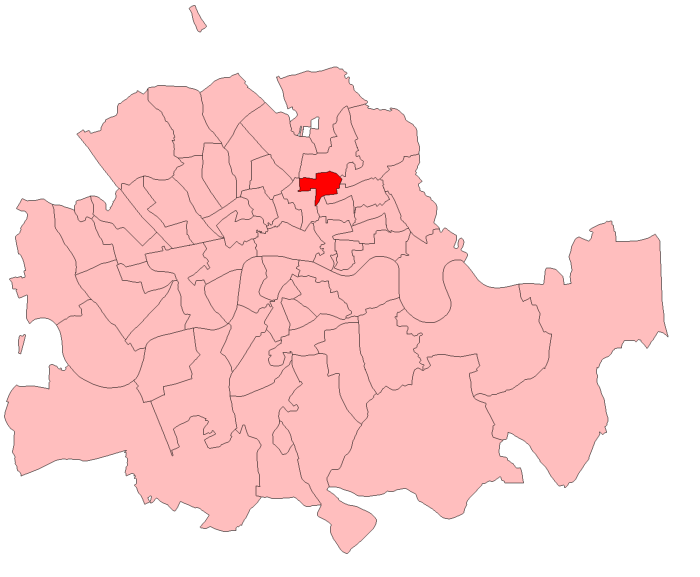
Haggerston in the Metropolitan area

General election January 1910: Haggerston
Party	Candidate	Votes	%	±%
Liberal	Henry George Chancellor	3,041	48.0	
Conservative	Rupert Edward Cecil Lee Guinness	2,586	40.9	
Social Democratic Federation	Herbert Burrows	701	11.1	
Majority		455	7.1	
Turnout				
Liberal gain from Conservative		Swing	+13.8	

General election December 1910: Haggerston
Party	Candidate	Votes	%	±%
Liberal	Henry George Chancellor	3,046	53.6	
Conservative	Rupert Edward Cecil Lee Guinness	2,641	46.4	
Majority		405	7.2	
Turnout				
Liberal hold		Swing	+0.1	

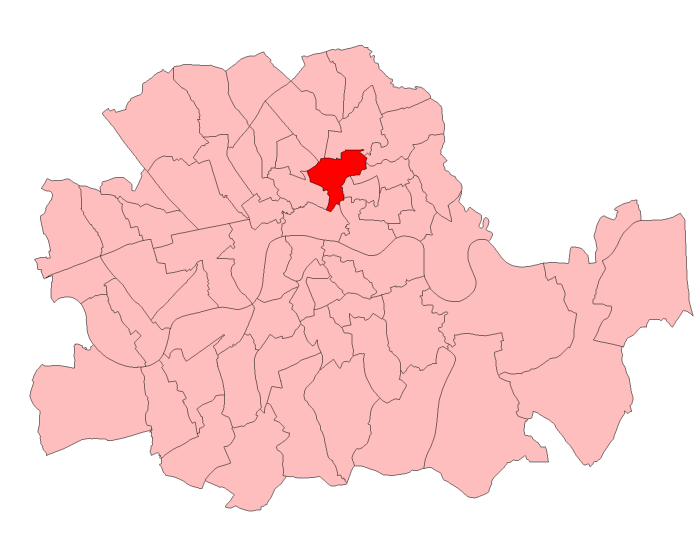
Shoreditch in London County Council area

General election 14 December 1918: Shoreditch
Party	Candidate	Votes	%	±%
National Liberal	Rt Hon. Christopher Addison	9,532	55.9	n/a
Unionist	Robert Standish Sievier	3,414	20.0	n/a
Independent Labour	J. Walton	2,072	12.2	n/a
Liberal	Henry George Chancellor	1,524	8.9	n/a
National	Thomas Warwick	504	3.0	n/a
Majority		6,118	35.9	n/a
Turnout		17,046	37.3	n/a
National Liberal win				

Parliament of the United Kingdom
Preceded by Viscount Elveden	Member of Parliament for Haggerston; January 1910 – 1918	Constituency abolished
