= Haggerston (UK Parliament constituency) =

Parliamentary constituency in the United Kingdom, 1885–1918

- Former borough constituency for the House of Commons

1885–1918
- Seats: one
- Created from: Hackney
- Replaced by: Shoreditch

Haggerston, formally known as the "Haggerston Division of Shoreditch", was a borough constituency centred on the Haggerston district of the Metropolitan Borough of Shoreditch in London. It returned one Member of Parliament (MP) to the House of Commons of the Parliament of the United Kingdom, elected by the first past the post system.

== History ==
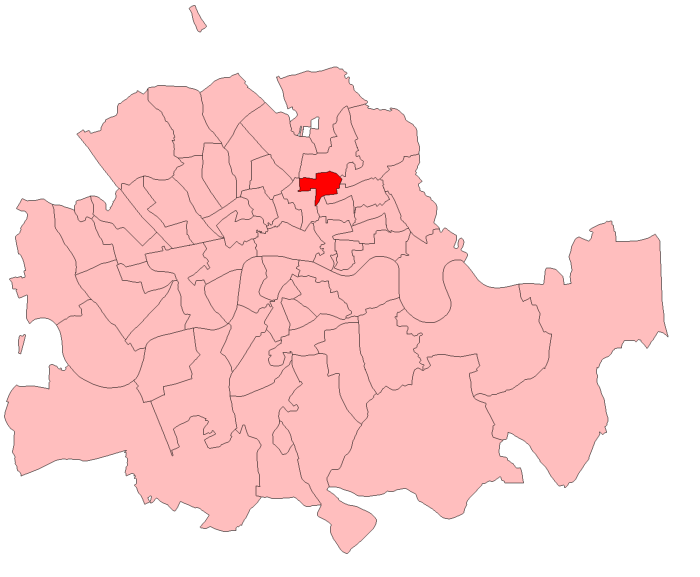
Haggerston in the Metropolitan area, boundaries 1885–1918

The constituency was created by the Redistribution of Seats Act 1885 for the 1885 general election and abolished for the 1918 general election.

== Boundaries ==
A map showing the wards of Shoreditch Metropolitan Borough as they appeared in 1916

The constituency was created in 1885, as a division of the parliamentary borough of Shoreditch in the East End of London. The area was administered as part of the Tower division of the county of Middlesex.

The division consisted of the Acron, Haggerston, Kingsland and Whitmore wards.

In 1889 there were administrative changes. The territory of the constituency was severed from Middlesex and included in the new County of London. The lower tier of local government in the area continued to be administered by parish vestries and local boards of works.

In 1900 local government in London was rationalised. The civil parish of St. Leonard, Shoreditch became part of a larger Metropolitan Borough of Shoreditch.

In the redistribution of parliamentary seats in 1918, the Metropolitan Borough of Shoreditch constituted a single parliamentary division of Shoreditch. The Haggerston division was abolished.

== Members of Parliament ==
Election	Member	Party
1885	Randal Cremer	Liberal
1895	John Lowles	Conservative
1900	Sir Randal Cremer	Liberal
1908 b-e	Rupert Guinness	Conservative
Jan. 1910	Henry Chancellor	Liberal
1918	constituency abolished	

== Election results ==
=== Elections in the 1880s ===
1885 general election: Haggerston
Party	Candidate	Votes	%	±%
Lib-Lab	Randal Cremer	2,736	68.5	
Conservative	Richard Denny Urlin	1,259	31.5	
Majority		1,477	37.0	
Turnout		3,995	59.3	
Registered electors		6,737		
Lib-Lab win (new seat)				

1886 general election: Haggerston
Party	Candidate	Votes	%	±%
Lib-Lab	Randal Cremer	2,054	55.1	−13.4
Liberal Unionist	Edwin Durning-Lawrence	1,677	44.9	+13.4
Majority		377	10.2	−26.8
Turnout		3,731	55.4	−3.9
Registered electors		6,737		
Lib-Lab hold		Swing	-13.4	

=== Elections in the 1890s ===
1892 general election: Haggerston
Party	Candidate	Votes	%	±%
Lib-Lab	Randal Cremer	2,543	61.1	+6.0
Conservative	Joseph Firbank	1,622	38.9	−6.0
Majority		921	22.2	+12.0
Turnout		4,165	65.6	+10.2
Registered electors		6,351		
Lib-Lab hold		Swing	+6.0	

Lowles

1895 general election: Haggerston
Party	Candidate	Votes	%	±%
Conservative	John Lowles	2,269	50.4	+11.5
Lib-Lab	Randal Cremer	2,229	49.6	−11.5
Majority		40	0.8	N/A
Turnout		4,498	67.5	+1.9
Registered electors		6,661		
Conservative gain from Lib-Lab		Swing	+11.5	

=== Elections in the 1900s ===
1900 general election: Haggerston
Party	Candidate	Votes	%	±%
Lib-Lab	Randal Cremer	2,290	50.3	+0.7
Conservative	John Lowles	2,266	49.7	−0.7
Majority		24	0.6	N/A
Turnout		4,556	67.2	−0.3
Registered electors		6,781		
Lib-Lab gain from Conservative		Swing	+0.7	

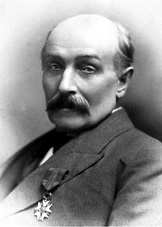
Cremer

1906 general election: Haggerston
Party	Candidate	Votes	%	±%
Lib-Lab	Randal Cremer	2,772	53.9	+3.6
Conservative	Rupert Guinness	2,371	46.1	−3.6
Majority		401	7.8	+7.2
Turnout		5,143	80.3	+13.1
Registered electors		6,403		
Lib-Lab hold		Swing	+3.6	

Burrows

1908 Haggerston by-election
Party	Candidate	Votes	%	±%
Conservative	Rupert Guinness	2,867	51.4	+5.3
Liberal	Walter Richard Warren	1,724	30.9	−23.0
Social Democratic Federation	Herbert Burrows	986	17.7	New
Majority		1,143	20.5	N/A
Turnout		5,577	65.9	−14.4
Registered electors		8,457		
Conservative gain from Lib-Lab		Swing	+14.2	

=== Elections in the 1910s ===
Chancellor

January 1910 general election: Haggerston
Party	Candidate	Votes	%	±%
Liberal	Henry Chancellor	3,041	48.0	−5.9
Conservative	Rupert Guinness	2,586	40.9	−5.2
Social Democratic Federation	Herbert Burrows	701	11.1	N/A
Majority		455	7.1	−0.7
Turnout		6,327	79.7	−0.6
Registered electors		7,936		
Liberal hold		Swing	+13.8	

December 1910 general election: Haggerston
Party	Candidate	Votes	%	±%
Liberal	Henry Chancellor	3,046	53.6	+5.6
Conservative	Rupert Guinness	2,641	46.4	+5.5
Majority		405	7.2	+0.1
Turnout		5,687	71.7	−8.0
Registered electors		7,936		
Liberal hold		Swing	+0.1	
