= 1915 Saffron Walden by-election =

UK parliamentary by-election

The 1915 Saffron Walden by-election was a parliamentary by-election held for the UK House of Commons constituency of Saffron Walden in Essex on 13 February 1915.

== Vacancy ==
The by-election was caused by the resignation of the sitting Liberal MP, Cecil Beck. Beck had been appointed a Lord Commissioner of the Treasury, one of the formal titles held by government Whips and under the Parliamentary rules of the day had to resign and fight a by-election.

== Candidates ==
Beck was re-selected to fight the seat by his local Liberal Association and as the wartime truce between the political parties was in operation no opposing candidate was nominated against him.

== Result ==
There being no other candidates putting themselves forward Beck was returned unopposed.

Saffron Walden by-election, 1915
| Party | Candidate | Votes | % | ±% |
|---|---|---|---|---|
| Liberal | Cecil Beck | Unopposed | N/A | N/A |
| Liberal hold | | | | |

== See also ==
- List of United Kingdom by-elections
- United Kingdom by-election records
- 1901 Saffron Walden by-election
- 1977 Saffron Walden by-election
