= Saffron Walden (constituency) =

Parliamentary constituency in the United Kingdom, 1885-2024

Coordinates: 51.95°N 0.35°E

- Former county constituency for the House of Commons
- Boundary of Saffron Walden in Essex

- Location of Essex within England
- County: Essex
- Electorate: 77,109 (December 2010)
- Major settlements: Saffron Walden, Great Dunmow

1885–2024
- Seats: One
- Created from: East Essex and West Essex
- Replaced by: North West Essex

Saffron Walden was a constituency (Note: A county constituency (for the purposes of election expenses and type of returning officer)) in Essex, which was represented in the House of Commons of the UK Parliament from 1922 to 2024 exclusively by members of the Conservative Party. (Note: As with all constituencies, the constituency elects one Member of Parliament (MP) by the first past the post system of election at least every five years.)

Further to the completion of the 2023 Periodic Review of Westminster constituencies, the seat was abolished. Subject to relatively minor boundary changes, it was reformed as North West Essex for the 2024 general election.

== Constituency profile ==
The constituency was by far the largest and most rural in Essex and covered the entire north-west corner of the county, an area of almost 400 square miles (1,000 km^{2}). It bordered Hertfordshire and Cambridgeshire and also extended deep into the middle of Essex near Chelmsford.

Two medium-sized market towns, Saffron Walden and Great Dunmow, were in the constituency. Both of these have historic links and are busy and regionally visitor-drawing towns in the South East.

The largest single source of employment in the constituency is Stansted Airport, while there are also a host of small businesses, many of them high-tech, along and at the ends of the London–Cambridge corridor.

=== In statistics ===
The constituency consisted of Census Output Areas from two local government districts with similar characteristics. Uttlesford district formed the bulk and has a working population whose income is close to the national average and a much lower than average reliance upon social housing. At the end of 2012, the unemployment rate in the constituency stood at 1.6% of the population claiming jobseekers allowance, compared to the regional average of 2.4%. The borough contributing to the bulk of the seat has a very low 10.1% of its population without a car, 17.7% of the population without qualifications, and a high 31.9% had level 4 qualifications or above. In terms of tenure, 71.6% of homes are owned outright or on a mortgage as of the 2011 census across the Uttlesford district.

== History ==
Saffron Walden was one of eight single-member divisions of Essex (later classified as county constituencies) created by the Redistribution of Seats Act 1885, replacing the three two member divisions of East, South and West Essex.

The boundaries were redrawn under the Representation of the People Act 1918, then remained virtually unchanged until changes brought in for the 2010 general election by the Fifth Periodic Review of Westminster constituencies.

The constituency mostly voted in Liberal Party MPs in its earlier history, but has been a Conservative safe seat based on election results since 1922, in which period the majorities have occasionally been marginal. However, the constituency returned a Conservative majority at the 2019 general election of over 27,000.

== Boundaries and boundary changes ==
=== 1885–1918 ===
- The Borough of Saffron Walden;
- The Sessional Divisions of Freshwell, Hinckford North, and Walden:
- Part of the Sessional Division of Hinckford South (Halstead Bench);
- The part of the Borough of Sudbury in the county of Essex; and
- The parish of Thaxted.

Formed from northern parts of the abolished West Division of Essex including the Municipal Borough of Saffron Walden, and northern parts of the abolished East Division.

=== 1918–1950 ===
- The Borough of Saffron Walden;
- The Urban District of Halstead; and
- The Rural Districts of Belchamp, Bumpstead, Dunmow, Halstead, Saffron Walden, and Stansted.

Gained northern parts of Epping, including Great Dunmow and Hatfield Broad Oak, and northern parts of Maldon, including Halstead. Other minor changes.

=== 1950–1974 ===
- The Borough of Saffron Walden;
- The Urban District of Halstead;
- The Rural Districts of Dunmow, Halstead, and Saffron Walden; and
- The Rural District of Braintree parishes of Bardfield Saling and Great Bardfield.

Local authorities re-organised – only nominal changes to boundaries of constituency.

=== 1974–1983 ===
- The Borough of Saffron Walden;
- The Urban District of Halstead; and
- The Rural Districts of Dunmow, Halstead, and Saffron Walden.

The two small parishes within the Rural District of Braintree were included in the new constituency of Braintree.

=== 1983–1997 ===
- The District of Uttlesford; and
- The District of Braintree wards of Bumpstead, Castle Hedingham, Colne Engaine and Greenstead Green, Earls Colne, Gosfield, Halstead St Andrews, Halstead Trinity, Sible Hedingham, Stour Valley Central, Stour Valley North, Stour Valley South, Upper Colne, and Yeldham.

Local authorities re-organised – no changes to boundaries of constituency.

=== 1997–2010 ===
- The District of Uttlesford; and
- The District of Braintree wards of Bumpstead, Castle Hedingham, Colne Engaine and Greenstead Green, Halstead St Andrews, Halstead Trinity, Sible Hedingham, Stour Valley Central, Stour Valley North, Stour Valley South, Upper Colne, and Yeldham.

Two small wards (Earls Colne and Gosfield) transferred to Braintree.

Map of boundaries 2010–2024

=== 2010–2024 ===
- The District of Uttlesford; and
- The Borough of Chelmsford wards of Boreham and The Leighs, Broomfield and The Walthams, Chelmsford Rural West, and Writtle.

The 2010 redistribution resulted in a major change, with eastern areas in the District of Braintree, including Halstead, being transferred to Braintree. Extended southwards to incorporate northern and western rural areas of the Borough of Chelmsford, including Writtle, which were transferred from the abolished constituency of West Chelmsford.

== Members of Parliament ==
From the snap election in 2017 until its abolition in 2024, this safe Conservative seat was represented by future party leader Kemi Badenoch. It was held for many years by former Chancellor of the Exchequer Rab Butler and by former Deputy Speaker of the House of Commons Sir Alan Haselhurst.

Election	Member	Party
1885	Herbert Gardner	Liberal
1895	Charles Gold	Liberal
1900	Armine Wodehouse	Liberal
1901	Joseph Pease	Liberal
Jan 1910	Douglas Proby	Conservative
Dec 1910	Cecil Beck	Liberal
1916	Cecil Beck	Coalition Liberal
1921	Cecil Beck	Independent Parliamentary Group
1922	William Foot Mitchell	Unionist
1929	Rab Butler	Conservative
1965 by-election	Sir Peter Kirk	Conservative
1977 by-election	Sir Alan Haselhurst	Conservative
2017	Kemi Badenoch	Conservative
2024	Seat abolished – see North West Essex	

== Elections ==
=== Elections in the 2010s ===
General election 2019: Saffron Walden
Party	Candidate	Votes	%	±%
Conservative	Kemi Badenoch	39,714	63.0	+1.2
Liberal Democrats	Mike Hibbs	12,120	19.2	+5.2
Labour	Thomas Van De Bilt	8,305	13.2	−7.6
Green	Coby Wing	2,947	4.7	New
Majority		27,594	43.8	+2.8
Turnout		63,086	72.5	−0.6
Registered electors		87,017		
Conservative hold		Swing	−2.0	

General election 2017: Saffron Walden
Party	Candidate	Votes	%	±%
Conservative	Kemi Badenoch	37,629	61.8	+4.6
Labour	Jane Berney	12,663	20.8	+9.0
Liberal Democrats	Mike Hibbs	8,528	14.0	+3.4
UKIP	Lorna Howe	2,091	3.4	−10.4
Majority		24,966	41.0	−2.4
Turnout		60,911	73.1	+1.7
Registered electors		83,690		
Conservative hold		Swing	−2.2	

General election 2015: Saffron Walden
Party	Candidate	Votes	%	±%
Conservative	Alan Haselhurst	32,926	57.2	+1.8
UKIP	Peter Day	7,935	13.8	+9.6
Labour	Jane Berney	6,791	11.8	+2.1
Liberal Democrats	Mike Hibbs	6,079	10.6	−16.8
Green	Karmel Stannard	2,174	3.8	+2.4
R4U	Heather Asker	1,658	2.9	New
Majority		24,991	43.4	+15.4
Turnout		57,563	71.4	−0.2
Registered electors		80,615		
Conservative hold		Swing	−4.0	

General election 2010: Saffron Walden
Party	Candidate	Votes	%	±%
Conservative	Alan Haselhurst	30,155	55.4	+4.6
Liberal Democrats	Peter Wilcock	14,913	27.4	−2.2
Labour	Barbara Light	5,288	9.7	−4.5
UKIP	Roger Lord	2,288	4.2	+1.5
BNP	Chrissie Mitchell	1,050	1.9	New
Green	Reza Hossain	735	1.4	New
Majority		15,242	28.0	+3.5
Turnout		54,429	71.6	+2.8
Registered electors		76,035		+4,324
Conservative hold		Swing	+3.4	

2005 notional result
Party	Vote	%
Conservative	25,086	50.8
Liberal Democrats	14,603	29.6
Labour	6,995	14.2
UKIP	1,320	2.7
Others	1,335	2.7
Turnout	49,339	68.8
Electorate	71,711	

=== Elections in the 2000s ===
General election 2005: Saffron Walden
Party	Candidate	Votes	%	±%
Conservative	Alan Haselhurst	27,263	51.4	+2.5
Liberal Democrats	Elfreda Tealby-Watson	14,255	26.9	+1.9
Labour	Swatantra Nandanwar	8,755	16.5	−6.1
UKIP	Raymond Tyler	1,412	2.7	−0.9
English Democrat	Raymond Brown	860	1.6	New
Veritas	Trevor Hackett	475	0.9	New
Majority		13,008	24.5	+0.5
Turnout		53,020	68.3	+3.1
Registered electors		77,600		+876
Conservative hold		Swing	+0.3	

General election 2001: Saffron Walden
Party	Candidate	Votes	%	±%
Conservative	Alan Haselhurst	24,485	48.9	+3.6
Liberal Democrats	Elfreda Tealby-Watson	12,481	24.9	−1.9
Labour	Tania Rogers	11,305	22.6	+1.1
UKIP	Richard Glover	1,769	3.5	+2.4
Majority		12,004	24.0	+5.5
Turnout		50,040	65.2	−11.7
Registered electors		76,724		+2,540
Conservative hold		Swing	+2.7	

=== Elections in the 1990s ===
General election 1997: Saffron Walden
Party	Candidate	Votes	%	±%
Conservative	Alan Haselhurst	25,871	45.3	−11.2
Liberal Democrats	Melvin Caton	15,298	26.8	−1.8
Labour	Malcolm Fincken	12,275	21.5	+7.2
Referendum	Richard Glover	2,308	4.0	New
UKIP	Ian Evans	658	1.2	New
Independent	Barry Tyler	486	0.9	New
Natural Law	Christopher Edwards	154	0.3	−0.1
Majority		10,573	18.5	−13.1
Turnout		57,050	76.9	−6.3
Registered electors		74,184		+3,709
Conservative hold		Swing	−4.7	

1992 notional result
Party	Vote	%
Conservative	33,378	56.6
Liberal Democrats	16,885	28.6
Labour	8,468	14.4
Others	246	0.4
Turnout	58,977	83.7
Electorate	70,475	

General election 1992: Saffron Walden
Party	Candidate	Votes	%	±%
Conservative	Alan Haselhurst	35,272	56.6	−1.1
Liberal Democrats	Mark Hayes	17,848	28.6	−0.3
Labour	John Kotz	8,933	14.3	+2.8
Natural Law	Michael Miller	260	0.4	New
Majority		17,424	28.0	−0.8
Turnout		62,313	83.2	+4.2
Registered electors		74,878		+1,693
Conservative hold		Swing	−0.4	

=== Elections in the 1980s ===
General election 1987: Saffron Walden
Party	Candidate	Votes	%	±%
Conservative	Alan Haselhurst	33,354	57.7	−0.2
Liberal (SDP)	Mark Hayes	16,752	29.0	−0.3
Labour	Robert Gifford	6,674	11.5	+0.2
Green	George Hannah	816	1.4	New
ACMFT	Oliver Smedley	217	0.4	−1.1
Majority		16,602	28.7	+0.1
Turnout		57,813	79.0	+2.1
Registered electors		73,185		+3,800
Conservative hold		Swing	+0.1	

General election 1983: Saffron Walden
Party	Candidate	Votes	%	±%
Conservative	Alan Haselhurst	30,869	57.8	+4.0
SDP (Liberal)	John Torode	15,620	29.3	+4.4
Labour	Robert Trory	6,078	11.4	−8.5
ACMFT	Oliver Smedley	797	1.5	+0.7
Majority		15,249	28.6	−0.3
Turnout		53,364	76.9	−4.7
Registered electors		69,385		+4,351
Conservative hold		Swing	–0.2	

=== Elections in the 1970s ===
General election 1979: Saffron Walden
Party	Candidate	Votes	%	±%
Conservative	Alan Haselhurst	28,563	53.8	+10.1
Liberal	Andrew Phillips	13,200	24.9	–5.5
Labour	Ben Stoneham	10,547	19.9	–6.1
ACMFT	Oliver Smedley	425	0.8	New
National Front	Rogar Bailey	342	0.6	New
Majority		15,363	28.9	+15.6
Turnout		53,077	81.6	+3.5
Registered electors		65,034		+2,651
Conservative hold		Swing	+7.8	

1977 Saffron Walden by-election
Party	Candidate	Votes	%	±%
Conservative	Alan Haselhurst	22,692	55.7	+12.0
Liberal	Andrew Phillips	10,255	25.2	−5.1
Labour	Ben Stoneham	5,948	14.6	−11.4
ACMFT	Oliver Smedley	1,818	4.5	New
Majority		12,437	30.5	+17.2
Turnout		40,713	64.8	–13.3
Registered electors		62,850		+467
Conservative hold		Swing	+8.6	

General election October 1974: Saffron Walden
Party	Candidate	Votes	%	±%
Conservative	Peter Kirk	21,291	43.7	–0.9
Liberal	Frank Moore	14,770	30.3	+0.4
Labour	Henry Green	12,652	26.0	+0.5
Majority		6,521	13.4	–1.2
Turnout		48,713	78.1	–5.3
Registered electors		62,383		+468
Conservative hold		Swing	–0.6	

General election February 1974: Saffron Walden
Party	Candidate	Votes	%	±%
Conservative	Peter Kirk	23,013	44.6	–8.3
Liberal	Frank Moore	15,468	30.0	+15.0
Labour	John Dowsett	13,138	25.5	–6.6
Majority		7,545	14.6	–23.3
Turnout		51,619	83.4	+6.1
Registered electors		61,915		+1,896
Conservative hold		Swing	–11.6	

General election 1970: Saffron Walden
Party	Candidate	Votes	%	±%
Conservative	Peter Kirk	24,549	52.9	+5.5
Labour	Ken Weetch	14,885	32.1	–7.8
Liberal	Frank Moore	6,959	15.0	+2.3
Majority		9,664	20.8	+13.3
Turnout		46,393	77.3	–5.2
Registered electors		60,019		+7,798
Conservative hold		Swing	+6.6	

=== Elections in the 1960s ===
General election 1966: Saffron Walden
Party	Candidate	Votes	%	±%
Conservative	Peter Kirk	20,441	47.4	–1.9
Labour	Stephen Haseler	17,176	39.8	+2.4
Liberal	Frank Moore	5,487	12.7	–0.5
Majority		3,265	7.6	–4.3
Turnout		43,104	82.5	+0.1
Registered electors		52,221		+1,497
Conservative hold		Swing	–2.1	

1965 Saffron Walden by-election
Party	Candidate	Votes	%	±%
Conservative	Peter Kirk	18,851	48.5	−0.8
Labour	Michael Cornish	15,358	39.5	+2.1
Liberal	Frank Moore	4,626	11.9	−1.3
Majority		3,493	9.0	−2.9
Turnout		38,835	76.1	–6.3
Registered electors		51,029		+305
Conservative hold		Swing	–1.4	

General election 1964: Saffron Walden
Party	Candidate	Votes	%	±%
Conservative	Rab Butler	20,610	49.3	–3.9
Labour	Michael Cornish	15,655	37.5	+1.5
Liberal	Frank Moore	5,539	13.2	+2.5
Majority		4,955	11.9	–5.4
Turnout		42,454	82.4	+1.2
Registered electors		50,724		+2,247
Conservative hold		Swing	–2.7	

=== Elections in the 1950s ===
General election 1959: Saffron Walden
Party	Candidate	Votes	%	±%
Conservative	Rab Butler	20,955	53.2	–1.0
Labour	Hampden Horne	14,173	36.0	–1.4
Liberal	David Ridley	4,245	10.8	+2.4
Majority		6,782	17.2	+0.4
Turnout		39,373	81.2	+1.6
Registered electors		48,477		+555
Conservative hold		Swing	+0.2	

General election 1955: Saffron Walden
Party	Candidate	Votes	%	±%
Conservative	Rab Butler	20,671	54.2	+2.3
Labour	Hampden Horne	14,253	37.3	–1.1
Liberal	Helen Carson	3,209	8.4	–1.1
Majority		6,418	16.8	+3.4
Turnout		38,133	79.6	–3.2
Registered electors		47,922		+86
Conservative hold		Swing	+1.7	

General election 1951: Saffron Walden
Party	Candidate	Votes	%	±%
Conservative	Rab Butler	20,564	52.0	+2.0
Labour	Reginald Groves	15,245	38.5	+0.9
Liberal	Oliver Smedley	3,774	9.5	–3.0
Majority		5,319	13.4	+1.1
Turnout		39,583	82.7	–1.7
Registered electors		47,836		+838
Conservative hold		Swing	+0.6	

General election 1950: Saffron Walden
Party	Candidate	Votes	%	±%
Conservative	Rab Butler	19,797	49.9	+3.0
Labour	Sidney Stanley Wilson	14,908	37.6	–6.1
Liberal	Oliver Smedley	4,963	12.5	+3.1
Majority		4,889	12.3	+9.1
Turnout		39,668	84.4	+9.9
Registered electors		46,998		–1,499
Conservative hold		Swing	+4.6	

=== Election in the 1940s ===
General election 1945: Saffron Walden
Party	Candidate	Votes	%	±%
Conservative	Rab Butler	16,950	46.9	–20.2
Labour	Sidney Stanley Wilson	15,792	43.7	+10.8
Liberal	George Adolphus Edinger	3,395	9.4	New
Majority		1,158	3.2	–31.0
Turnout		36,137	74.5	+5.4
Registered electors		48,497		+6,126
Conservative hold		Swing	–15.5	

=== Elections in the 1930s ===
General Election 1939–40: Another General Election was required to take place before the end of 1940. The political parties had been making preparations for an election to take place from 1939 and by the end of this year, the following candidates had been selected;

- Conservative: Rab Butler
- Labour: Clara Rackham

General election 1935: Saffron Walden
Party	Candidate	Votes	%	±%
Conservative	Rab Butler	19,669	67.1	–10.5
Labour	Clara Rackham	9,633	32.9	+10.5
Majority		10,036	34.3	–21.1
Turnout		29,302	69.2	–1.2
Registered electors		42,371		+1,212
Conservative hold		Swing	–10.5	

General election 1931: Saffron Walden
Party	Candidate	Votes	%	±%
Conservative	Rab Butler	22,501	77.7	+33.2
Labour	Sidney Stanley Wilson	6,468	22.3	–6.0
Majority		16,033	55.3	+39.2
Turnout		28,969	70.4	–5.4
Registered electors		41,159		+906
Conservative hold		Swing	+19.6	

- The Liberal candidate, Arthur Musgrove Mathews withdrew at the last minute

=== Elections in the 1920s ===
General election 1929: Saffron Walden
Party	Candidate	Votes	%	±%
Unionist	Rab Butler	13,561	44.5	−7.1
Labour	William Cash	8,642	28.3	+1.7
Liberal	Arthur Musgrove Mathews	8,307	27.2	+5.4
Majority		4,919	16.2	−8.8
Turnout		30,510	75.8	+2.7
Registered electors		40,253		+7,663
Unionist hold		Swing	−4.4	

General election 1924: Saffron Walden
Party	Candidate	Votes	%	±%
Unionist	William Foot Mitchell	12,289	51.6	+7.3
Labour	William Cash	6,340	26.6	−2.7
Liberal	Arthur Musgrove Mathews	5,195	21.8	−4.4
Majority		5,949	25.0	+10.0
Turnout		23,824	73.1	+5.4
Registered electors		32,590		+378
Unionist hold		Swing	+5.0	

General election 1923: Saffron Walden
Party	Candidate	Votes	%	±%
Unionist	William Foot Mitchell	9,652	44.3	+0.7
Labour	William Cash	6,398	29.3	−0.7
Liberal	Robert McNair Wilson	5,752	26.4	+13.8
Majority		3,254	15.0	+1.4
Turnout		21,802	67.7	−3.4
Registered electors		32,212		+438
Unionist hold		Swing	+0.7	

General election 1922: Saffron Walden
Party	Candidate	Votes	%	±%
Unionist	William Foot Mitchell	9,844	43.6	New
Labour	William Cash	6,797	30.1	+0.2
National Liberal	William Dawson Harbinson	3,097	13.7	−56.4
Liberal	Robert McNair Wilson	2,853	12.6	New
Majority		3,047	13.5	N/A
Turnout		22,591	71.1	+23.3
Registered electors		31,774		+92
Unionist gain from National Liberal		Swing	N/A	

=== Elections in the 1910s ===
Sir Cecil Beck

General election 1918: Saffron Walden
Party		Candidate	Votes	%
C	National Liberal	Cecil Beck	10,628	70.1
	Labour	Jimmy Mallon	4,531	29.9
Majority			6,097	40.2
Turnout			15,159	47.8
Registered electors			31,682	
	National Liberal win (new boundaries)			
C indicates candidate endorsed by the coalition government.

1915 Saffron Walden by-election
Party	Candidate	Votes	%	±%
Liberal	Cecil Beck	Unopposed		
Registered electors				
Liberal hold				

Cecil Beck

General election December 1910: Saffron Walden
Party	Candidate	Votes	%	±%
Liberal	Cecil Beck	4,071	50.2	+1.8
Conservative	Douglas Proby	4,031	49.8	−1.8
Majority		40	0.4	N/A
Turnout		8,102	88.2	−2.1
Registered electors		9,187		
Liberal gain from Conservative		Swing	+1.8	

General election January 1910: Saffron Walden
Party	Candidate	Votes	%	±%
Conservative	Douglas Proby	4,283	51.6	+10.5
Liberal	Jack Pease	4,011	48.4	−10.5
Majority		272	3.2	N/A
Turnout		8,294	90.3	+9.0
Registered electors		9,187		
Conservative gain from Liberal		Swing	+10.5	

=== Elections in the 1900s ===
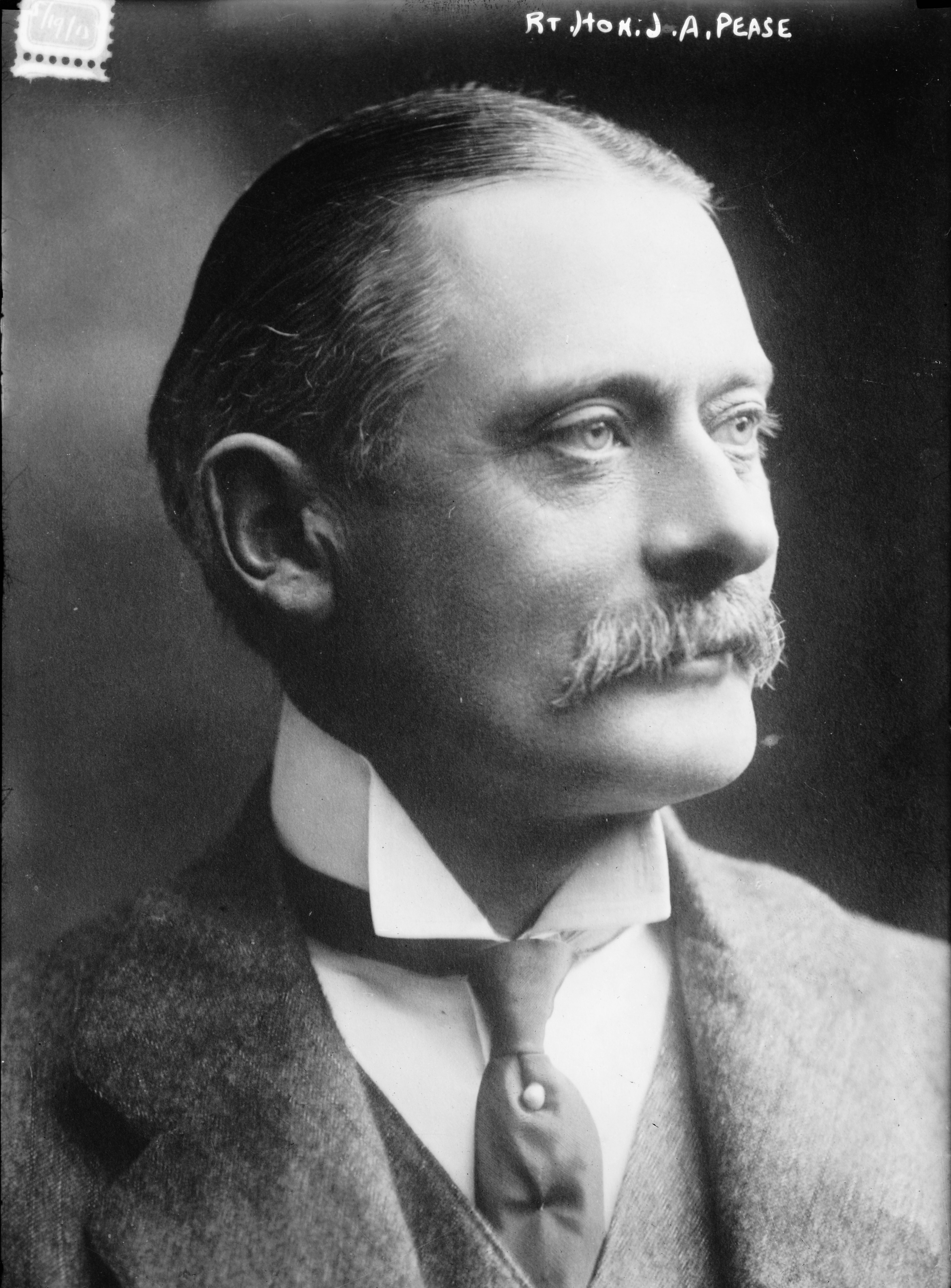
Jack Pease

General election 1906: Saffron Walden
Party	Candidate	Votes	%	±%
Liberal	Jack Pease	4,203	58.9	+8.0
Conservative	Walter Barttelot	2,935	41.1	−8.0
Majority		1,268	17.8	+16.0
Turnout		7,138	81.3	+6.7
Registered electors		8,779		
Liberal hold		Swing	+8.0	

1901 Saffron Walden by-election
Party	Candidate	Votes	%	±%
Liberal	Jack Pease	3,994	55.5	+4.6
Conservative	Charles Wing Gray	3,202	44.5	−4.6
Majority		792	11.0	+9.2
Turnout		7,196	84.2	+7.6
Registered electors		8,550		
Liberal hold		Swing	+4.6	

General election 1900: Saffron Walden
Party	Candidate	Votes	%	±%
Liberal	Armine Wodehouse	3,247	50.9	−2.1
Conservative	Charles Wing Gray	3,137	49.1	+2.1
Majority		110	1.8	−4.2
Turnout		6,384	74.6	−6.0
Registered electors		8,556		
Liberal hold		Swing	−2.1	

=== Elections in the 1890s ===
General election 1895: Saffron Walden
Party	Candidate	Votes	%	±%
Liberal	Charles Gold	3,806	53.0	−10.0
Conservative	Charles Wing Gray	3,381	47.0	+10.0
Majority		425	6.0	−20.0
Turnout		7,187	80.6	+0.9
Registered electors		8,920		
Liberal hold		Swing	−10.0	

1892 Saffron Walden by-election
Party	Candidate	Votes	%	±%
Liberal	Herbert Gardner	Unopposed		
Liberal hold				

- Caused by Gardner's appointment as President of the Board of Agriculture

General election 1892: Saffron Walden
Party	Candidate	Votes	%	±%
Liberal	Herbert Gardner	4,564	63.0	+8.0
Conservative	Philip Vernon Smith	2,683	37.0	−8.0
Majority		1,881	26.0	+16.0
Turnout		7,247	79.7	+0.4
Registered electors		9,098		
Liberal hold		Swing	+8.0	

=== Elections in the 1880s ===
General election 1886: Saffron Walden
Party	Candidate	Votes	%	±%
Liberal	Herbert Gardner	4,059	55.0	−6.3
Conservative	George William Brewis	3,319	45.0	+6.3
Majority		740	10.0	−12.6
Turnout		7,378	79.3	−4.1
Registered electors		9,306		
Liberal hold		Swing	−6.3	

General election 1885: Saffron Walden
Party	Candidate	Votes	%
Liberal	Herbert Gardner	4,755	61.3
Conservative	Charles Hedley Strutt	3,006	38.7
Majority		1,749	22.6
Turnout		7,761	83.4
Registered electors		9,306	
Liberal win (new seat)			

== See also ==
- List of parliamentary constituencies in Essex

== Notes ==
Preceded by Essex Western	UK Parliament constituency 1885–	Succeeded by Current incumbent

Parliament of the United Kingdom
Preceded by Leeds South	Constituency represented by the chancellor of the Exchequer; 1951–1955	Succeeded by Bromley
Preceded by Woodford	Constituency represented by the father of the House; 1964–1965	Succeeded by Thirsk and Malton
