= Crime and its repression =

1903 book by Gustav Aschaffenburg

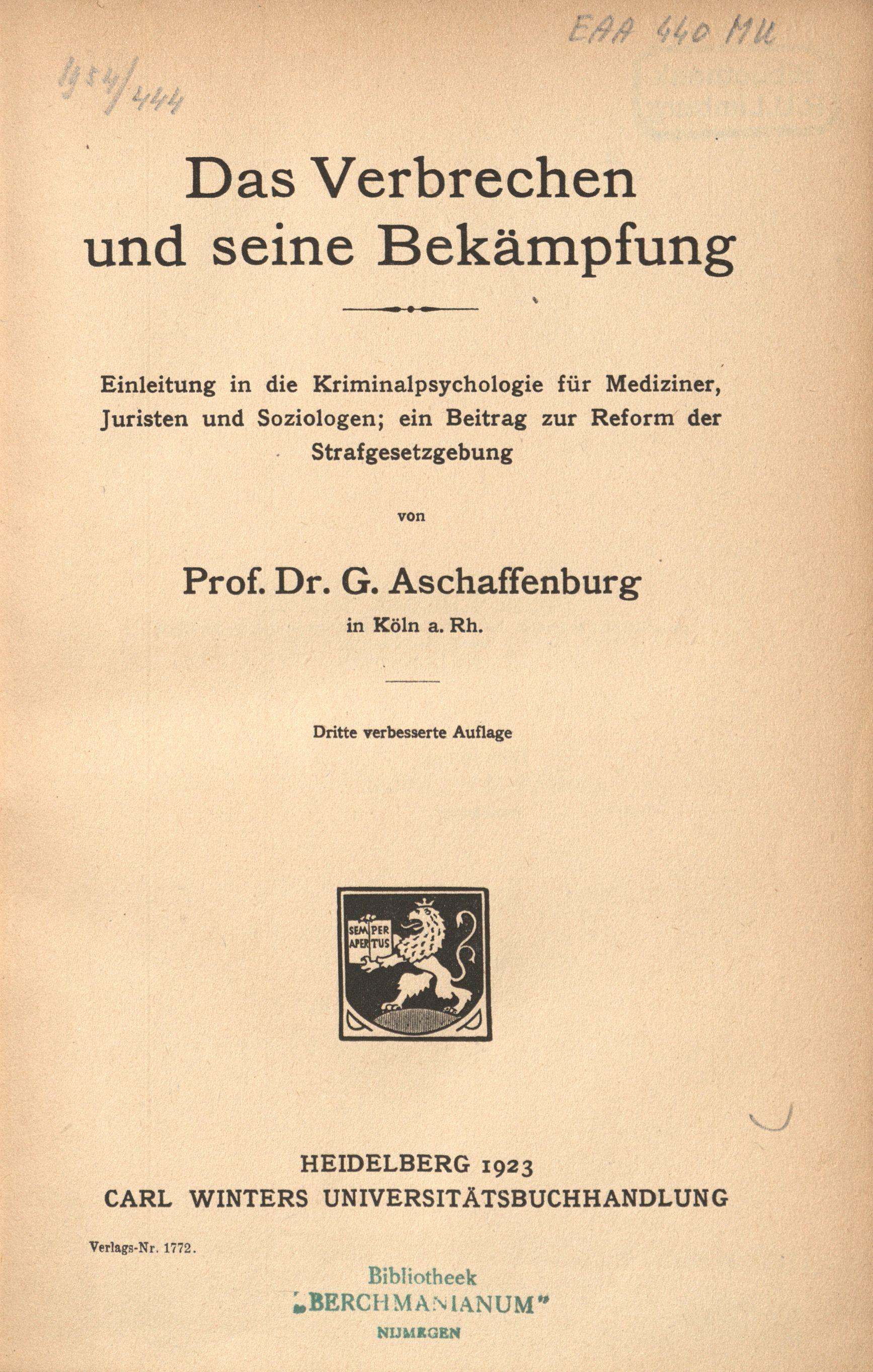
- Title page of the book
- Author: Gustav Aschaffenburg
- Translator: Adelbert Albrecht
- Language: English
- Published: 1903
- Publisher: C. Winter
- Publication date: 1913
- Publication place: Germany
- Media type: Book

Crime and its repression (German: Das Verbrechen und seine Bekämpfung) is a book that was originally published in 1903 and written by Gustav Aschaffenburg. It was translated to English in 1913. It investigates the underlying causes of crime and advises on different methods of punishment and deterrence. It was highly influential in the domain of criminal psychology and widely used as educational literature among universities for decades after its publication.

== Context ==
=== Aschaffenburg's career ===
Aschaffenburg did his medical studies in various cities, including Heidelberg, Strassburg, Freiburg, Berlin and Würzburg. After finishing his studies he did several internships under for example Professors Ball, Charcot and Pierre Marie in Paris as well as in Vienna under Professor Krafft-Ebing. This helped him gain a scientific stance enabling him to publish books such as Crime and its repression. After that, he became an assistant to a scholar called Kraeplin in Heidelberg and this time particularly pushed his interest in the field of criminology. His time as Kaeplins assistant in Heidelberg was a major inspiration and influence in writing the book. Heidelberg was seen as an ideal place for the studies of criminology due to its demographic situation and its position as a leading institution in the area. Due to the lack of medical faculties and universities in the area, Heidelberg became a main place for counseling for a total of three penal institutions. Heidelberg's status later proved as an advantage to Aschaffenburg when writing the book, as it increased his reputation and gave him more practical experience. The close connection to rural as well as urban areas, such as Mannheim, was also an advantage for his criminology studies. At the time Aschaffenburg was writing Crime and its repression he was already working in a prison in Halle, where he served as the head of medical service. Aschaffenburg himself also stated that the book was inspired by the lack of criminal sociology and biology knowledge that he saw in many lawyers and criminal judges throughout his career.

=== The evolvement of criminal psychology ===
One of the first implementations of psychology on criminal justice regulations was the so-called Constitutio Criminalis Carolina of 1532. It was impactful in the early modern era in most of the German speaking parts of Europe and built the base for the criminal justice system Aschaffenburg would later analyse in his book. A few hundred centuries later in the early half of the nineteenth century many scholars from different disciplines such as psychology and law started to pick up interest in the psychological causes of criminal behaviour establishing the field of criminology. In Germany the main contributors included police officials, medical doctors, prison administrators, law experts, judges and many more. Legal experts and medical doctors tended to study more the individual, whereas moral statisticians were more interested in the social causes of crime. Aschaffenburg would eventually combine both of these focuses in his book. Overall scholars at the time more or less focused on a bibliographical approach concentrating on an individual's lifespan leading up to the criminal event. Considering an individual's life leading up to the criminal event is in accordance with Aschaffenburg's approach as later described in Crime and its repression.

After the early half of the nineteenth century there was a shift in legal regulations towards more lenience for criminals who were mentally ill. In 1879 the possibility to send a criminal to an asylum for observation was implemented. This brought psychiatrists closer to the courts and resulted in more psychological approaches towards criminology over the 19th century. Psychologists around this timeframe also benefitted from the rising acknowledgement of natural sciences among the German society. From 1875 onwards, the field of criminology managed to establish itself as an independent field of science. This context made the base to enable psychologists like Aschaffenburg to publish their books coming from a psychologically focused perspective.

In his earlier publications, the scholar Cesare Lombroso reasoned that criminals possess certain physical characteristics. In his opinion there was an anthropological type of a person who would be born a criminal, something that Aschaffenburg would argue against later on. Around the same time, around 1880, the novel penal reform movement established itself. Franz von Liszt was one of the main figures pushing for a reform of the criminal justice system. He and his colleagues were aiming for a scientific approach to identify the causes of crime in order to protect society better. This scientific approach was necessary to build the base for the new penal reform. Aschaffenburg also argued for a reform of the criminal justice system to protect society in accordance with Liszt. But in contrast to Liszt, he focused more on protecting already convicted individuals and helping their rehabilitation. Later on, Lambroso published his book L'uomo delinquente and in the late 19th century Lambrosos publications became a major influence in the field of criminal psychology. Lambroso later on admitted that born criminals only made up around one third of all criminals, moving more towards Aschaffenburg's opinion. Prison doctors across Europe, including Germany, disproved said anthropological theories in the 1890s with the help of their own case studies. The most prominent people in the movement of criminal psychology, which was gaining momentum in the beginning of the 20th century, neither believed in "born criminals" nor did they reason for an isolated moral defect. Aschaffenburg was in line with these perspectives and published his book around this time.

== Content ==
Aschaffenburg discusses crime, analyzes its causes and advises on how to prevent crime. His statistical analysis focuses on Germany as the main area of interest, but from time to time he manages to draw comparisons and conclusions from other European countries. In his analysis he makes use of methods and findings taken from various scientific fields such as forensic medicine, psychology, criminology and statistics. Aschaffenburg divides the causes of crime into social and individual causes. The section around social causes revolves around seasonal fluctuations in crime, race and religion, occupation and location. He also analyzes the influence of substance use, as well as prostitution, gambling, superstition and economic and social conditions. The individual causes are classified in upbringing, education, sex and domestic status. The author also discusses mental and physical characteristics of criminals and goes into the relationship between mental illness and criminology.

Aschaffenburg manages to make links between the major themes he identifies. The seasonal fluctuations in crimes for example, especially those of sexual nature, can be explained by changes in ones psychological balance according to the author. But fluctuations of crimes, he reasons, are also closely linked to fluctuations in the consumption of substances across the year. Aschaffenburg generally attributes alcohol a big role in influencing criminal behaviour. He not only discusses the effect of alcohol on the criminal individual, but also focuses on children of alcoholics. Other substances are not discussed in much detail, especially because Aschaffenburg sees them as non-relevant because of their expensive nature.

Demographic factors are discussed as both, social and individual causes, and make up a major part of the book. Aschaffenburg discusses the anonymity and greater opportunities that attract criminals to cities. He also writes a lot about the economic and social influence of criminals and admits that for example political circumstances can severely impact crime rates. The effect of race especially is closely tied to economic situations and thus no conclusion could be drawn according to the author. Age plays a role in the sense of morality and responsibility, Aschaffenburg concludes. The author also analyzes sex differences, and a prominent theme is the relationship between sex and prostitution. According to the author, prostitution constitutes the only outlet woman have for their criminal tendencies. Aschaffenburg manages to explain the links between lower education, difficult social position and economic poverty and dependence. In his analysis of physical characteristics he concludes that many things that were seen as indicators of crime are actually not predictive of criminal behaviour. Instead he looks in more details at the mental characteristics criminals show. The author then concludes that mental illness should be addressed as well, as it is rooted in the same circumstances as crime, such as social difficulties. Aschaffenburg concludes that neither individual nor environmental causes alone turn an individual into a criminal, but more the complex interaction between both.

In the last chapter of the book the author starts off with emphasizing the importance of investigating causes of crime. He sees that importance reflected in the high recidivism rates, the increasing crime rates and the general social damage that is done to society via criminal behaviour. Aschaffenburg advocates for prevention in form of physical, mental and economic support. He also strains how important it is to reduce alcohol abuse and to support children growing up in difficult social circumstances to break generational cycles. The author also gives his opinion on different methods of punishment, responsibility issues and probation. He also discusses the advantages and disadvantages of alternative methods such as vocational labour. Aschaffenburg generally advocates for prevention, such as increased education, rather than punishment which doesn't solve the issue at the root. He also reasons for individualization of punishment over fixed sentences and explains why judges need to take a close look at an individual life before making a judgement.

== Reception ==
Crime and its repression is an originally German book that was translated into English in 1913 and reprinted in 1968. These two events helped the book gain more prominence on a broader scale. The book established itself as one of the most widely used educational books of criminology up until the 1930s, especially in the US. The book was one of Germany's first full criminal reviews and that made it exceptional for its time. It sparked public interest in the topic of crime's causes and prevention. The considerate collection of data and Aschaffenburg's ability to generalize was the scientific basis needed around the beginning of the 20th century. This basis, combined with consistent and effective propaganda, such as by Tighe Hopkins, pushed the increase in attention towards criminal psychology among the public.

The book was especially well received for its careful approach of analyzing statistics and making use of a progressive method. Many reviews praise the author for his objective, scientific method and his care for exceptionally detailed analyses. Many of Aschaffenburg's conclusions drawn in Crime and its repression based on carefully collected and verified data could debunk several theories that were discussed in the domain of criminology at the time of publishment. Reviews from the US praise the author for his sharp way of reasoning and conclude that his statements focused on Germany can easily be transferred to the US. In particular, his opinions about juveniles involved in court trials found much support among the academic community. Aschaffenburg was commended for the amount of psychological insight these sections showed. Especially the proposal of individualization of punishment was perceived as rather novel and progressive and Aschaffenburg was one of the leading advocates for this proposal. An additional factor that made Crime and its repression so novel and impressive for reviewers from journals about political and social sciences for example, was the emphasis that was laid upon the search for causes of criminality itself. Aschaffenburg's eagerness to actually identify the causes of criminal behaviour and treat the problem at the root was well received by scholars around the world.

The same reviews often criticize the lack of reference to the US, where some of Aschaffenburg's proposals were already implemented. Scholars strain that Aschaffenburg could have easily turned to some states in the US as an example discuss the effectiveness of indeterminate sentences, probation as well as parole regulations and prisoners aid societies.

After the book was published, Gustav Aschaffenburg continued to practice in a psychiatry in Cologne and kept on publishing various educational books on criminology and psychology. He also published his first own magazine called "Monatszeitschrift", the first edition was sold in April 1904. He became one of the most influential forensic psychologists of his time, especially in Germany and the USA. After having to flee from nationalsocialism in the 1930s, he became a professor at the Johns-Hopkins University in the USA.

=== Criminal psychology in Germany across the 20th and 21st century ===
Since the publication of the book, criminal psychology has seen a very dynamic development across the 20th century. In the beginning of the 20th century it experienced a rapid increase in popularity, partially due to the effort of Aschaffenurg and his book. The leading scholars of this movement were psychiatrists and lawyers up until the mid 20th century. The main efforts in the early 20th century were targeted at the combination of social and individual causes of crime, such as in Crime and its repression. In the Weimar years in Germany, the trend in criminology drifted away from sociological causes and focused increasingly on anthropological approaches. This was an approach that was not shared by Aschaffenburg's perspective as presented in Crime and its repression. Later on, under Nationalsocialism criminal biology got promoted. That included the firm belief in heredity of criminal behaviour and a lack of scientific reasoning. Heredity of criminal behaviour was something that was carefully analyzed by Aschaffenburg in his book. As opposed to his stance in Crime and its repression, heredity of criminal behaviour was generalized and misused around this time. Supported by the broader academic community, this approach became the basis for many of the crimes committed under the cover of criminology, such as forced sterilization or euthanasia programmes. Many renowned scholars, including Aschaffenburg himself or Max Grünhut for example expressed their disapproval and fled the country, contributing to the broader export of knowledge in the domain of criminal psychology. After 1945, criminologists in Germany started refocusing on the less drastic parts of criminal psychology and a shift towards the relationship between society and criminal behaviour became visible, something that Crime and its repression advocated for. Criminal psychology in the 21st century follows Aschaffenburg's basic concept from 1903, as explained in Crime and its repression, in the way it combines social and individual factors when assessing criminals.
