= Armine Wodehouse (Liberal politician) =

British politician

Armine Wodehouse CB (24 September 1860 – 1 May 1901) was a British civil servant and Liberal politician.

== Biography ==
Wodehouse was a younger son of John Wodehouse, 1st Earl of Kimberley, and his wife Lady Florence, daughter of Richard FitzGibbon, 3rd Earl of Clare. He was assistant private secretary to his father, as Colonial Secretary 1880–82 and as India Secretary 1882–85, then principal private secretary when Lord Kimberley was India Secretary again in 1886 and 1892–94, and Foreign Secretary 1894–95. After Lord Rosebery's government, including Kimberley, resigned in June 1895, Wodehouse was appointed a CB for his service in the Foreign Office. In the subsequent general election he stood for Parliament unsuccessfully in the Isle of Wight. In October 1900 he was returned to Parliament for Saffron Walden. Considered one of the more promising young Liberals in the House of Commons, he only held the seat until his early death in May the following year.

Wodehouse married Eleanor Mary Caroline, daughter of the author Matthew Arnold, in 1889. They had one son. Wodehouse died in May 1901, aged only 40. His widow later married William Mansfield, 1st Viscount Sandhurst. She died in December 1934.

== See also ==
- Earl of Kimberley
- List of United Kingdom MPs with the shortest service

Parliament of the United Kingdom
Preceded by Charles Gold	Member of Parliament for Saffron Walden; 1900–1901	Succeeded by Jack Pease
