= Clara Rackham =

English feminist and politician (1875–1966)

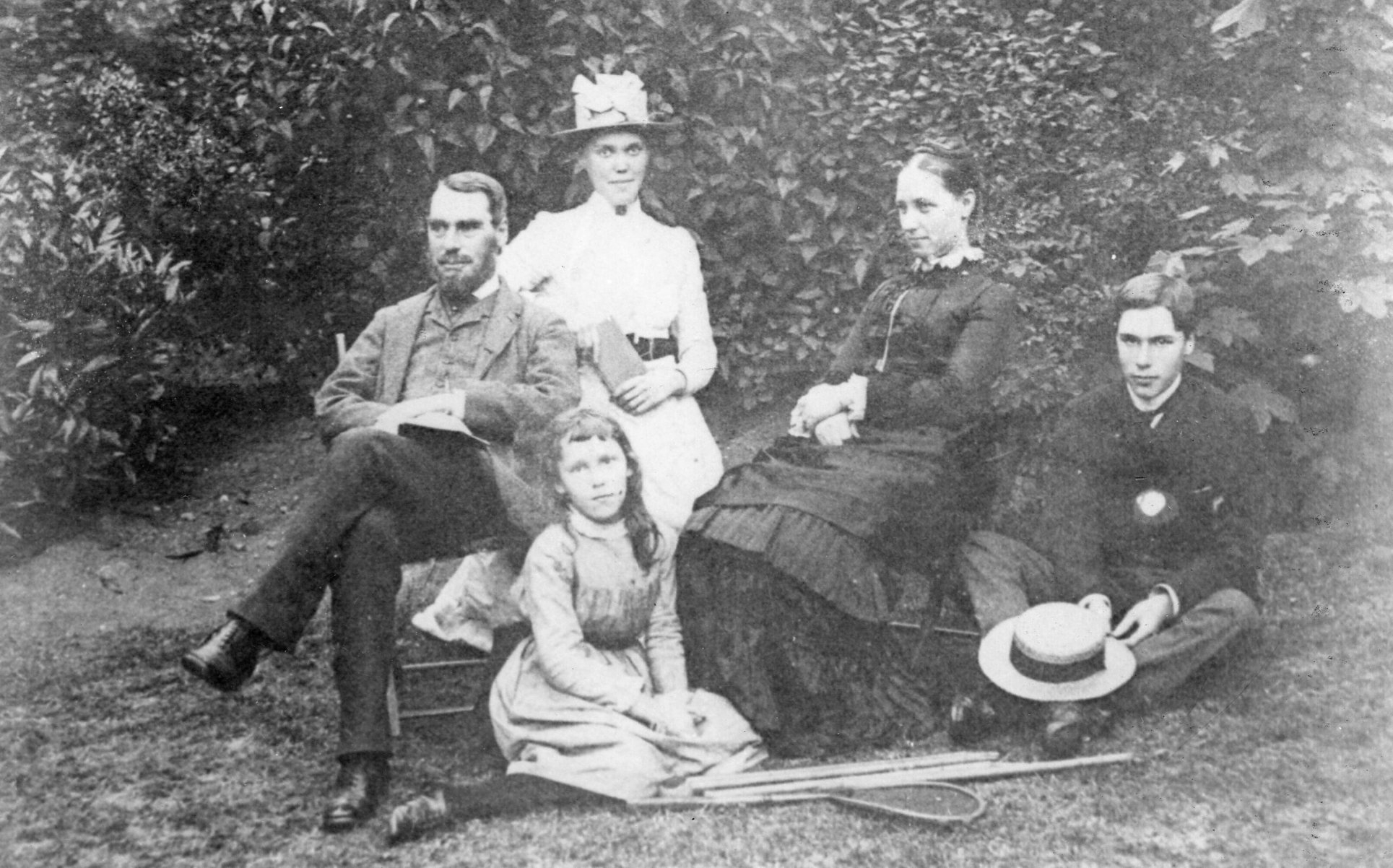
Clara (centre front), with her father Henry and mother Emma, sister Margaret and brother Francis

Clara Dorothea Rackham née Tabor (3 December 1875 – 11 March 1966) was an English feminist and politician active in the women's suffrage movement, the Women's Co-operative Guild, the peace movement, adult education, family planning and the labour movement. She was a pioneering magistrate, Poor Law Guardian, educator, anti-poverty campaigner and penal reformer in Cambridge where she was a long-serving city and county councillor.

Rackham was vice-chairman of Cambridgeshire County Council from 1956 to 1958 and chairman of the Cambridgeshire County Council Education Committee from 1945 to 1957. She first came to prominence through her leading role in the National Union of Women's Suffrage Societies and later became a significant national figure in the labour movement, acquiring a national reputation for her expertise on factory conditions, workers' rights, equal pay, and national insurance.

== Family and early life ==
Clara Rackham (known as Dorothea to her family) was born in Notting Hill, the daughter of Henry Tabor, a gentleman farmer from a non-conformist family based in Bocking in Essex and Emma Tabor (née Woodcock) who came from Wigan, Lancashire. She was educated at Notting Hill High School, St Leonards School (1892–93), Bedford College in 1894, and like her older sister, Margaret, attended Newnham College, Cambridge.

At Newnham College (1895–98) Clara Tabor studied Classics but much of her time was taken up with outdoor pursuits and with politics. She was a prominent supporter of the Liberal Party in the Newnham College Political Society, a proficient long-distance cyclist, swam regularly in the River Cam, and was captain of the hockey team. Clara left with the equivalent of a third-class degree (women did not officially receive degrees from Cambridge University until 1948). However, she had made a lifelong friend in another Newnham student, Susan Lawrence, one of the first three women to be elected to parliament as Labour MPs, and had also met her future husband, Harris Rackham, a lecturer in classics at Newnham College from 1893. Harris, a brother of the illustrator Arthur Rackham, became a Senior Fellow at Christ's College, Cambridge in 1899. The couple married in 1901 and lived at 4 Grange Terrace before moving to 18 Hobson Street, the Senior Tutor's House at Christ's College in 1911, and then setting up home in a Georgian house at 9 Park Terrace, Cambridge overlooking Parker's Piece in 1924. The marriage was a happy one and lasted until Harris's death in 1944. Clara remained in the house until 1957.

Rackham established the Cambridge branch of the Women's Co-operative Guild in 1902 and became its president, remaining active in her local group for over twenty years and writing on the value of co-operative ideals in Cambridge: A Brief Study in Social Questions (1906) edited by Eglantyne Jebb. Jebb founded the Save the Children Fund in 1919 to raise money for German and Austrian children. In 1923 Rackham served on the birth control subcommittee of the Standing Joint Committee of Industrial Women's Organizations (SJCIWO) and by 1930 had become chairman of the organisation. Rackham chaired the National Conference of Labour Women at the Kingsway Hall in London where SJCIWO put forward two reports for discussion; on abolition of the marriage bar, and on equal pay for equal work. In Cambridge she worked with her friend, the Homerton College-trained Leah Manning (President of the National Union of Teachers in 1930, elected as the Labour MP for Islington East in 1928 and then for Epping in 1945). Both women were associated with the ragged school set up in a building in Young Street which is now the site of Anglia Ruskin University Music Therapy Department. In the 1930s Rackham supported Manning's initiatives in parliament to welcome Basque children to Britain who were seeking refuge during the Spanish Civil War and some of these children were given homes in Cambridge.

== Liberal Party ==
The youthful Rackham was an admirer of William Ewart Gladstone. She was the leader of the Liberal group at Newnham College and spoke in student debates. When Gladstone died in 1898 on the day before she was due to begin part one of the Classical Tripos she was not told the news in case she were to do badly. Rackham is first listed as a host of a public meeting in an advertisement that appeared on 24 October 1902 in The Cambridge Independent Press. Her attendance is reported at the public meeting on 29 October 1902 held at the old Sturton Hall. The Liberal Party were protesting against the Education Bill which would have excluded women from their role on school boards. Rackham objection to the legislation was that it removed the right of women to be elected by local voters to their existing roles and made them reliant on the consent of other members of boards rather than a direct mandate from the people.

== Leading suffragist ==
Like other suffragists from a privileged background, Rackham was brought into direct contact with the plight of the poor and disadvantaged through her work as a Poor Law Guardian and was shocked by what she saw. Her experiences with poor relief for the Castle End ward of Cambridge (1904–15) reinforced her conviction that it was essential for women to have the vote if things were to change. Adela Adam, a classicist at Girton College, persuaded Rackham to join the Cambridge Women's Suffrage Association. This was a branch of the constitutional, non-militant National Union of Women's Suffrage Societies (NUWSS), the President of which was the veteran suffragist, Millicent Garrett Fawcett.

Rackham proved to be a first-class organiser, giving rousing speeches, and touring the surrounding villages to drum up support for women's suffrage. She was faced with a hostile crowd in Newmarket. Rackham was elected to the executive committee of the Eastern Federation of the NUWSS and then to the national executive committee which she chaired from 1909 to 1915 when she resigned to take up a position as a government factory inspector. Cambridge sent a sizeable contingent to the 'Great Pilgrimage' of law-abiding suffragists that converged on Hyde Park from routes all over the country in 1913. Rackham joined the procession at Burwell and gave a stirring address to the marchers in the market square in Cambridge before the procession set off for Royston. In London she was seated on the podium next to Millicent Fawcett and formed part of the delegation to visit Asquith.

Rackham steered the national organisation through its most turbulent period in 1915 with considerable tact and skill when Millicent Fawcett's qualified support for women's involvement in the war effort was opposed by a majority of the NUWSS committee who tendered their resignations and by large sections of the membership who were either pacifists or primarily interested in ending the war by securing a negotiated peace with Germany. She managed to combine her deep personal loyalty to Fawcett with her own principled opposition to the war by the advocacy of a compromise whereby the NUWSS would agree to support women's war work in principle but individual members would be permitted to pursue whatever activities they wished either in war work, for example, working in hospitals, or supporting initiatives to bring about peace. Rackham's proposal was accepted as NUWSS policy thereby averting the danger of the organisation falling apart. After women over 30 were enfranchised under the Representation of the People Act 1918, the NUWSS dissolved itself and was succeeded by the National Union of Societies for Equal Citizenship in 1919. She had no formal legal training but from 1923 to 1931 she edited, and often wrote, a legal column for The Women's Leader, the journal of the new organisation.

== Factory inspector ==
During the First World War Rackham worked as a factory inspector for the Home Office and was one of four women appointed to temporary positions on 25 October 1915 working alongside Jeanette Tawney, wife of the philosopher R. H. Tawney. She was deployed initially in Lancashire and then in the London area. The post meant that she had to turn down the offer of an academic position at Bedford College in the University of London, which was founded as a women's college, because she could not be spared from work of national importance. She also worked voluntarily in the University of Liverpool Settlement.

From 1930 to 1932 Rackham served on the Royal Commission on Unemployment Insurance where she clashed with the cotton industry administrator Raymond Streat who thought unemployment benefits (the dole) too high, and wrongly assumed this was the consensus on the commission. Rackham was a signatory to a minority report by the Labour Party members on the Commission in 1933. She later published a short book in which she demonstrated her own expertise on factory conditions, Factory Law in 1938. She was a lifelong advocate of workers' rights and an early advocate of the 40-hour work week.

== Labour Party politician in Cambridge ==
At the end of the First World War Rackham joined the Labour Party though she stood as an Independent representing the National Union of Societies for Equal Citizenship (NUSEC) in the Cambridge Borough Council election of March 1919. Rackham developed a close relationship with Hugh Dalton, who was to become Chancellor of the Exchequer in the Attlee ministry of 1945, and campaigned for Dalton when he contested the 1922 Cambridge by-election. Leah Manning remembered that, during the 1926 United Kingdom general strike, the Cambridge strike headquarters was in the Rackhams' basement kitchen.

Rackham held numerous elected positions in Cambridge and was made an Alderman by both the city and the county council. She was first elected as a councillor for West Chesterton in north Cambridge (1919–22) and was later returned for Romsey, a working-class area of the city on the unfashionable side of the railway bridge in which many of the families of local railway workers lived in 1929. Rackham was returned unopposed to represent Romsey for the last time in 1946.

Rackham stood for Parliament twice with no success: she was defeated in Chelmsford (1922) and lost heavily to a rising star in the Conservative Party, the sitting MP, R. A. Butler, in Saffron Walden (1935). With the exception of the few years in which she worked as a factory inspector she never left Cambridge. She fought innumerable battles to improve living conditions for the working-class communities in the north and east of the city, lobbying hard for the indoor heated swimming pool on the corner of Parker's Piece and Mill Road. Today's light and airy glass pool remains as one of her lasting achievements. She opened the Rock Road Public Library and also helped to finance the construction of the Labour Club on Mill Road which was built by voluntary labour in the 1920s. Ramsay MacDonald, the first Labour Party Prime Minister, laid the foundation stone in 1926 and she spoke at the opening ceremony in 1928.

== Magistrate and penal reformer ==
Rackham became a magistrate in 1920, and, with Florence Ada Keynes (mother of economist John Maynard Keynes) and Edith Bethune-Baker, was one of the first women in Cambridge to serve on the bench. The work of the criminal justice system and, in particular, the way in which the law dealt with juvenile offenders became a central concern for her throughout her life. Margery Fry, director of the Howard League for Penal Reform from its inception in 1921, and another JP, was a friend. She joined the Howard League and worked with Clara Martineau of Birmingham City Council as part of a group reporting on child sexual abuse to Parliament in 1925. Rackham was also a founder-member of the Magistrates' Association in 1927 and an advocate of probation, and opponent of corporal punishment. In 1933 she wrote to The Manchester Guardian regarding the recent Children and Young Persons Act and drew attention to the range of options made available to magistrates when dealing with children in need of care or protection while criticising aspects of the legislation for not going far enough. In 1933 she argued that no young person under the age of 17 should be sent to prison. At the time the age limit was 14. She resigned as a magistrate in 1950, and from her other committees when she became aware that loss of hearing had made it hard for her to carry on.

== Broadcasting ==
Rackham was a pioneering broadcaster in the early days of BBC radio in the 1920s and one of the first women to be heard on the airwaves. She gave talks on the work of a magistrate and on legal matters. A series How we Manage Our Affairs in 1929 began with a talk "How we Elect our Councillors".

== Education ==
Rackham was chairman of the Cambridgeshire County Council Education Committee from 1945 to 1957 and took a strong interest in girls' education, nursery education, and education in the early years and campaigned for free school milk and meals for the benefit of undernourished children. She was a personal friend of Henry Morris, the innovative Director of Education for Cambridgeshire from 1922, and shared his visionary ideal of the 'village college'. Village colleges combined secondary education with community and adult education and were set up in Sawston, Bottisham, Bassingbourn, Comberton, Impington, Linton and elsewhere in the countryside surrounding Cambridge with Rackham's enthusiastic support. However, she never fully embraced the Labour Party's post-war support for comprehensive education, believing that small selective grammar schools were of more benefit to working-class children. She served with Lilian Mary Hart Clark on the governing body of the Cambridge School of Arts, Crafts and Technology, which was renamed the Cambridgeshire College of Arts and Technology in 1958, and Anglia Ruskin University in 2005. A large modern building containing laboratories and teaching rooms was erected on the Cambridge campus in 1972 and named Rackham in her honour. This was demolished in 2009. She had a lifelong interest in the education of working people, was a part-time lecturer in social history and local government for the Workers' Educational Association, and elected Chairman of the WEA Eastern District. She always valued and retained her links with Newnham College where she organised a summer school for working women and was on the college's governing body from 1920 to 1940 and on the Newnham College council from 1924 to 1931.

== Peace movement ==
Like many former suffragists, Rackham placed her hopes for peace in the League of Nations between the wars and she attended meetings of the local Cambridge branch whenever she could. At the height of the Cold War, when the country was beset with fears of a nuclear war breaking out between the Soviet Union and the United States, Rackham joined the Campaign for Nuclear Disarmament which was founded in 1958 to call for Britain to lead the world in getting rid of nuclear weapons by disarming unilaterally. Her great-niece, Sarah Rackham, remembers being taken as a child on the annual CND march from Aldermaston to London. Rackham participated in her last peace march in 1961 at the age of eighty-five. Other members of the Tabor family, including her niece, Mary Tabor, also remember being taken on the Aldermaston March by Rackham when they were children.

== Final years ==
Rackham became a well-known figure in Cambridge in her later years, riding everywhere on her bicycle, doing voluntary work in the community, enjoying her contact with young and old alike, adjusting with indomitable good humour to her own loss of hearing, and reading aloud to the partially sighted. In 1962 she delivered her last speech at the Golden Jubilee of the Cambridge Branch of the National Council of Women of Great Britain. In 1993 Joyce Bellamy and Eileen Price, who wrote the entry on Rackham in The Dictionary of Labour Biography, recalled how overwhelmed they had been by the public response to a letter requesting information about her life and work which they had sent to The Cambridge Evening News in 1980. Although she had been brought up in the Christian faith, her outlook on life became decidedly secular over the years and she eventually joined the British Humanist Association. Bellamy and Price note that Rackham had come to adopt the practice of waiting outside the borough council chamber until the prayers before council meetings had finished. She also refused the mayoralty of Cambridge because she did not wish to take part in religious observances while agreeing to chair meetings of Cambridge Borough Council which were not preceded by prayers (1956–1958). She declined the Freedom of the City of Cambridge, requesting instead that a bench be placed outside the Meadowcroft retirement home on Trumpington Road for the use of the residents. She stated that she did not want to have a bust of herself displayed in Shire Hall, Cambridge during her lifetime but stipulated that the council could do whatever they thought was appropriate after her death.

Rackham moved into the Langdon House residential care home after the death of her sister, Margaret, who had lived with her at 9 Park Terrace after Harris Rackham died. She then relocated herself to Meadowcroft to make available a place at Langdon House for an old person who was poorer than she was before returning to Langdon House when another place there became available. Rackham died in Langdon House in 1966 after enjoying her 90th birthday celebrations, which were attended by friends and well-wishers representing over twenty local organisations, charities, and voluntary groups which she had supported over the years. She was cremated at the cemetery on Huntingdon Road on 15 March 1966. A tribute written in the Newnham College Roll Letter in 1967 reads:

Anyone who studies the social reforms of the century in Cambridge will see how much they owe to Mrs Rackham's devoted and unstinting championship of the under-privileged. Her aim was to give them a better way of life. Her success is her memorial.

== Publications ==
- Contribution to Cambridge: A Brief Study in Social Questions (1906) by Eglantyne Jebb, on co-operation
- Survey of Cambridge for Social Conditions in Provincial Towns (1912) by Helen Bosanquet
- Royal Commission on Unemployment Insurance, abridged minority report (1933, Fabian Society)
- Factory Law (1938)
- Lawless Youth. A Challenge to the New Europe. A Policy for the Juvenile Courts prepared by the International Committee of the Howard League for Penal Reform 1942–1945 (1947), with Margery Fry, Max Grünhut, Hermann Mannheim, and Wanda Grabinska.

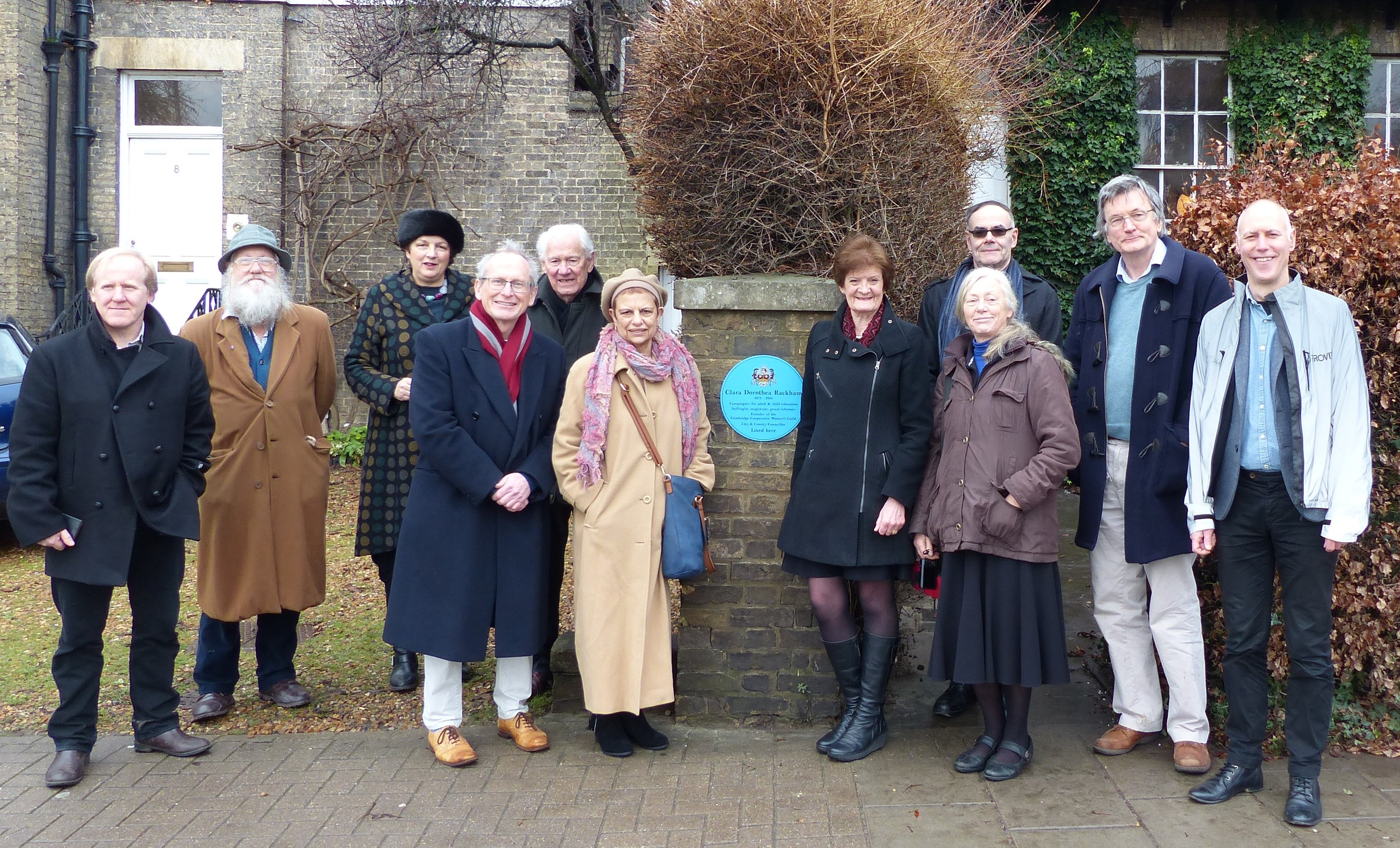
Unveiling of the blue plaque for Clara Rackham

== Legacy ==
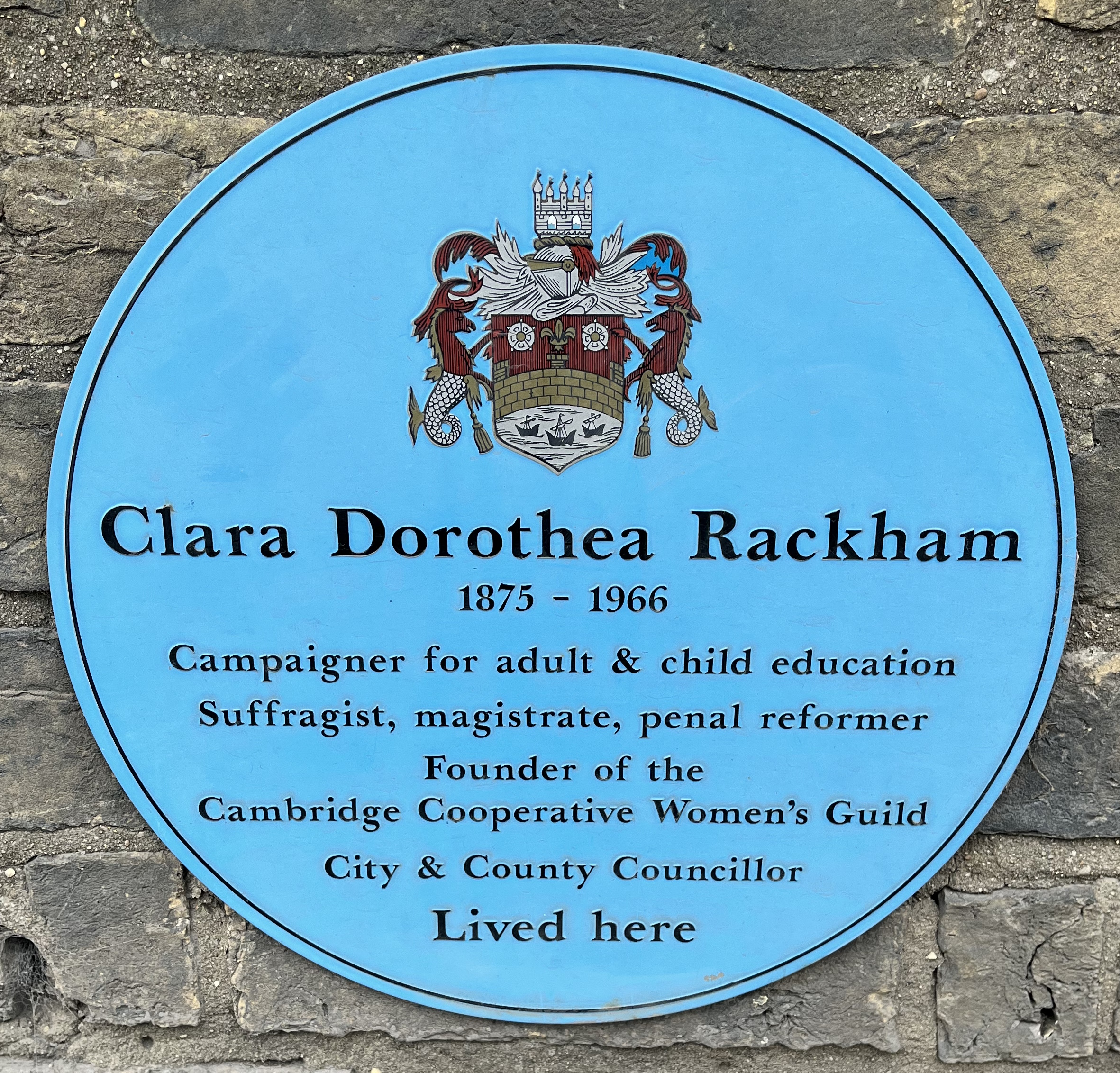
Clara Dorothea Rackham (1875–1966) - Blue plaque at 9 Park Terrace, Cambridge

In 1944 Rackham presented the Central Library in Cambridge with a unique collection of, for the most part, signed and numbered editions of Arthur Rackham's illustrated books. Rackham Close, in Arbury, Cambridge, is named after her as was a room in the Alex Wood Hall in Norfolk Street, the headquarters of the Cambridge City Labour Party. A bust was commissioned and manufactured but its whereabouts today are unknown. In 2018, the centenary of some women obtaining the vote, Rackham and Leah Manning were selected by the Women's Local Government Society to be included in their list of pioneers whose lives had inspired a younger generation to engage in service to their local communities.

A celebration of Rackham's life and work in words, music and theatre organised by Mary Joannou took place in the presence of members of the Rackham family at Anglia Ruskin University on 2 November 2018. The event included a specially commissioned play entitled Clara Rackham and the General Strike written by Ros Connelly, young dancers from the Bodyworks Studio, and presentations by Sarah Rackham, Deborah Thom and Councillor Anna Smith. The civic ceremony in which the blue plaque was unveiled by Stella Manzie, who spoke about Rackham's pioneering achievements in local government, took place at Newnham College on 20 November 2018. Gillian Sutherland, Fellow Emerita at Newnham College, spoke about Rackham in her historical context. Both events were filmed by Antony Carpen and may be seen on YouTube. The blue plaque was put up at 9 Park Terrace, a property belonging to Emmanuel College, on 25 January 2019 and a reception was held in Emmanuel. The blue plaque may be seen on the website of Cambridge, Past, Present & Future, a charity which administers the blue plaque scheme in Cambridge. In 2019 the Friends of the Milton Road Library have named one of the two community rooms in the re-opened Milton Road Library after Clara Rackham. Mary Joannou's biography of Clara Rackham, The Life and Times of Clara Rackham: Socialist, Suffragist and Social Reformer was published by Routledge in 2022.

Rackham's nieces, Mary and Lucy Tabor, were interviewed by Brian Harrison, about their aunt, in November 1975 and January 1976 respectively, as part of the Suffrage Interviews project, titled Oral evidence on the suffragette and suffragist movements: the Brian Harrison interviews. Mary talks about Rackham's time at Newnham, her relationship with Harris, and her support of the Labour Party, Campaign for Nuclear Disarmament and NUWSS. Lucy's interview includes details about Rackham's home life as well as her work as a borough and county councillor, and as a Poor Law guardian.
