= Stanley Fink, Baron Fink =

British businessman (born 1957)

The Right Honourable The Lord Fink FCA
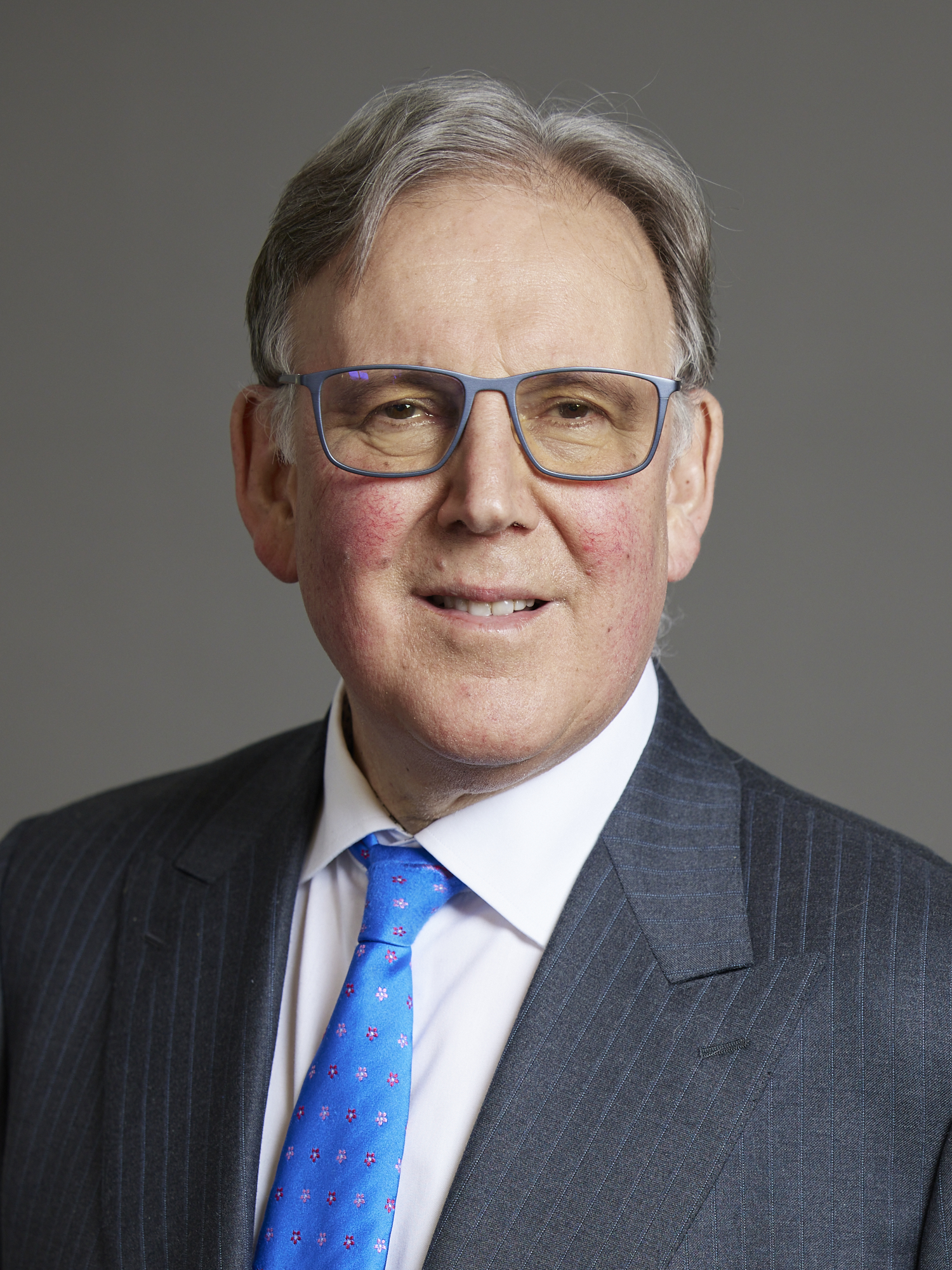
- Official portrait, 2023

Member of the House of Lords
- Lord Temporal
- Life peerage 18 January 2011

Personal details
- Born: Stanley Fink; 15 September 1957 (age 69) Manchester, Lancashire, England
- Party: Conservative
- Spouse: Barbara Paskin (m. 1981)
- Children: 3
- Education: Trinity Hall, Cambridge (MA)

Stanley Fink, Baron Fink, FCA (born 15 September 1957), is a British hedge fund manager and parliamentarian, who was formerly CEO of Man Group plc.

Created a Life Peer in 2011, Lord Fink sits on the Conservative Party benches in the House of Lords.

== Early life ==
The son of Louis Fink and Janet née Stone, he was born in 1957 at Crumpsall, Lancashire, where his father ran a grocery store. Fink was educated at Manchester Grammar School before going up to read law at Trinity Hall, Cambridge (graduating MA).

== Business career ==
Fink started his career at the accountancy firm, Arthur Andersen, qualifying as FCA before briefly working for Mars Inc, then joining Citibank. He was chief executive officer of Man Group, a hedge fund, from 2000 to 2007. Described as the "godfather" of the UK hedge fund industry, he is credited with building the Man Group up to its FTSE 100 public company status, the largest listed hedge fund company in the world.

In September 2008, Fink came out of retirement to be chief executive of International Standard Asset Management (ISAM) in partnership with Lord Levy. Appointed chairman of ISAM in 2015, he retired from its board in December 2018.

In 2013, Fink featured on web reality TV show HF Lions' Den, when Lord Fink interviewed three emerging hedge fund managers, and allocated $25 million in investment between the three funds.

Fink was on the board of Marex until 2023 and was chairman and the largest shareholder of Zenith Hygiene Group for 10 years, which was sold to Bain Capital in 2018.

Fink is a seed investor in Ecometrica, an environmental software business headquartered in Edinburgh. An early investor in New Forests Company, among the largest sustainable forestry businesses in Africa operating in Uganda, Tanzania and Rwanda, the company has become a market leader in the provision of sustainable wood and FSC-certified transmission poles throughout East Africa.

In July 2018, Fink was appointed as Global Special Advisor to eToro. Later that year, the Fink family office was formed, which invests predominantly in PropTech, FinTech and EdTech ventures, and includes:

- British Pearl – property investment platform: also chairman;
- Farillio – speedy, easy law;
- Bud – leaders in open banking;
- Seneca Learning – a leading education platform;
- PiTops – a leading STEM, creative learning company;
- Blackbullion – helping teach students financial literacy;
- Project Etopia – leading modular building company, also chairman;
  - part owner of hotel group, K2, with 2 leading luxury hotels in Courchevel.

== Political career ==
In January 2009, Fink was appointed co-treasurer of the Conservative Party. Created a life peer on 18 January 2011, he took the title of Baron Fink, of Northwood in the County of Middlesex; Lord and Lady Fink were regular guests of David Cameron at Chequers and, after the resignation of Peter Cruddas over a cash-for-access controversy, Lord Fink returned as treasurer of the Conservative Party, to which he had previously given £2.62m: he is among the top 20 biggest donors to the Conservative Party.

In February 2015, Fink was accused by the Labour leader Ed Miliband of undertaking "tax avoidance activities". In reply, Fink called the statement "untrue and defamatory" and threatened to sue Miliband, challenging him to repeat the claim without the protection of parliamentary privilege or retract it. However, days later Fink stated that he did avoid tax, and that "everyone does tax avoidance at some level".

== Philanthropy ==
Lord Fink is Chairman of Governors at Ark Burlington Danes Academy, President of Evelina Children's Hospital and is on the Board of Trustees of the Oxford Centre for Hebrew and Jewish Studies. In September 2009, he was appointed Chairman of Absolute Return for Kids. In 2010, he and Cherie Blair attended a fundraiser for learning difficulties charity Norwood, of which he is a benefactor.

== Personal life ==
Interviewed by The Jewish Chronicle Fink said, "Being Jewish is part of what I am and it is an inheritance I am proud to pass on to my children" but also added, "I have accepted that, as we live in multi-cultural Britain, one of my children might not marry someone Jewish." According to the Sunday Times Rich List, Fink is worth an estimated £70 million.

In 1981 Fink married Barbara Paskin, by whom he has two sons, Jordan and Alex, and a daughter, Gabriella.

Lord and Lady Fink live in north London as well as owning properties in France and Spain.

== Arms ==
Coat of arms of Stanley Fink, Baron Fink
Coronet That of a Baron Crest A Hedgehog Sable grasping with the dexter forefoot a Menorah of nine branches Or. Escutcheon Azure a Pale between two Skis palewise Argent. Supporters On either side a Stag Or supporting a Golf Club head upwards Sable. Motto Faber est suæ quisque fortunæ (Latin) (Eng.) Everyone is the maker of his own fortune

Orders of precedence in the United Kingdom
Preceded by The Lord Stoneham of Droxford	Gentlemen; Baron Fink	Followed by The Lord Dannatt
