= Gustav Aschaffenburg =

German psychiatrist

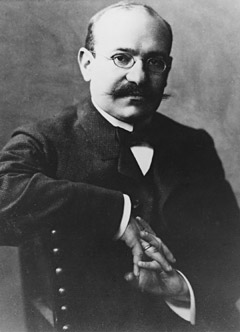
- Born: May 23, 1866; Zweibrücken, Kingdom of Bavaria
- Died: September 2, 1944 (aged 78)
- Citizenship: German
- Education: University of Strasbourg (MD)
- Scientific career
- Fields: Psychiatry, criminology, forensic psychiatry
- Institutions: University of Heidelberg; University of Halle; University of Cologne; Catholic University of America; Johns Hopkins University
- Thesis: (1890)
- Academic advisors: Emil Kraepelin

Gustav Aschaffenburg (May 23, 1866 – September 2, 1944) was a German psychiatrist born in Zweibrücken.

== Early life ==
In 1890 he received his medical doctorate from the University of Strasbourg with a thesis on delirium tremens. Later he worked as an assistant to Emil Kraepelin at the psychiatric university clinic in Heidelberg, with whom he later extensively wrote about Haltlose personality disorder. He then practiced psychiatric medicine at the University of Halle and at the Akademie für praktische Medizin in Cologne (from 1919 the University of Cologne).

In the 1930s Aschaffenburg's academic career at Cologne was terminated by the Nazi edict, Gesetz zur Wiederherstellung des Berufsbeamtentums, and he eventually emigrated to the United States, working as a professor at the Catholic University of America in Washington, D.C., and at Johns Hopkins University in Baltimore.

He wrote about the distinctions between Haltlose and Gemütlose psychopathy.

Aschaffenburg was a pioneer in the fields of criminology and forensic psychiatry. In 1903 he published an early systematic study on the causes of crime titled "Das Verbrechen und seine Bekämpfung", in which he discusses individual-hereditary and social-environmental factors, and also dismisses Cesare Lombroso's idea of the so-called "born criminal". Later the work was translated into English, and published as Crime and it's Repression (1913). It was also translated into Swedish by Olof Kinberg and Julia Kinberg.
