= 1965 Saffron Walden by-election =

UK Parliamentary by-election

The 1965 Saffron Walden by-election of 23 March 1965 was held after the awarding of a life peerage to Conservative MP Rab Butler.

The seat was safe, having been won at the 1964 United Kingdom general election by 5,000 votes The Conservative Party held the seat.

== Result of the previous general election ==
General election 1964: Saffron Walden
Party	Candidate	Votes	%	±%
Conservative	Rab Butler	20,610	49.3	
Labour	Michael D Cornish	15,655	37.5	
Liberal	Frank PD Moore	6,189	13.3	
Majority		4,955	11.8	
Turnout		42,454	82.41	
Conservative hold		Swing		

== Result of the by-election ==
By-election 1965: Saffron Walden
Party	Candidate	Votes	%	±%
Conservative	Peter Kirk	18,851	48.5	−0.8
Labour	Michael D Cornish	15,358	39.5	+2.0
Liberal	Frank PD Moore	4,626	11.9	−1.4
Majority		3,493	9.0	−2.8
Turnout		38,835		
Conservative hold		Swing		
