= Peter Kirk (English politician) =

British writer, broadcaster and Conservative politician

Sir Peter Kirk
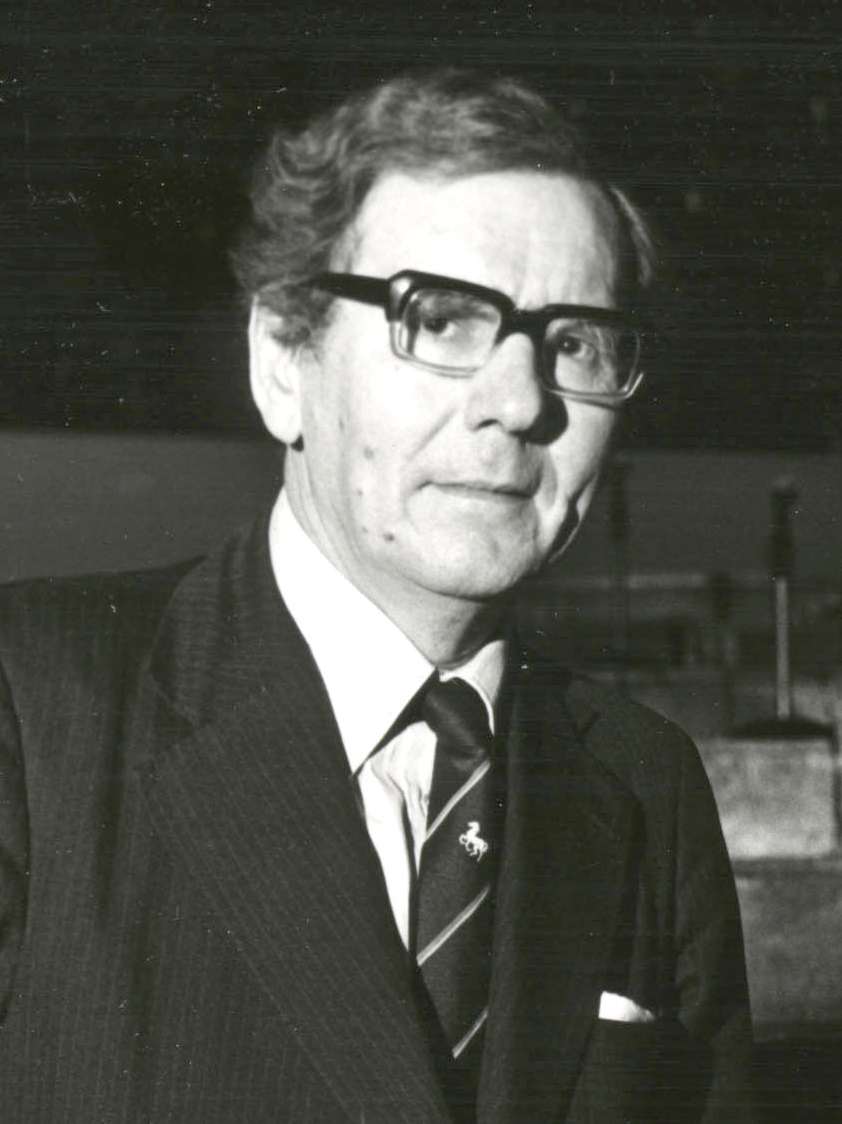
- Kirk in 1976

Leader of the Conservatives in the European Parliament
- In office 1 January 1973 – 17 April 1977
- Preceded by: Position established
- Succeeded by: Geoffrey Rippon

Parliamentary Under-Secretary of State for Defence
- In office 1970–1973
- Prime Minister: Edward Heath
- Sec. of State: The Lord Carrington

Parliamentary Under-Secretary of State for War Financial Secretary to the War Office
- In office 21 October 1963 – 1 April 1964
- Prime Minister: Alec Douglas-Home
- Sec. of State: James Ramsden
- Preceded by: James Ramsden

Member of Parliament
- In office 23 March 1965 – 17 April 1977
- Preceded by: R. A. Butler
- Succeeded by: Alan Haselhurst
- Constituency: Saffron Walden
- In office 26 May 1955 – 25 September 1964
- Preceded by: Richard Acland
- Succeeded by: Albert Murray
- Constituency: Gravesend

Personal details
- Born: Peter Michael Kirk; 18 May 1928 Oxford, England
- Died: 17 April 1977 (aged 48) Steeple Bumpstead, England
- Party: Conservative
- Spouse: Elizabeth Graham
- Children: 3
- Education: Trinity College, Oxford
- Occupation: Politician; broadcaster; journalist

Sir Peter Michael Kirk (18 May 1928 – 17 April 1977) was a British writer, broadcaster, Conservative politician, minister in the governments of Alec Douglas-Home and Edward Heath, and leading European Parliamentarian.

== Early life ==
The elder son and fourth child of Kenneth Escott Kirk (Bishop of Oxford, 1937-1954), Kirk was born in Headington, Oxford, and was educated at Marlborough and at Trinity College, Oxford, where he obtained an MA in modern history having first studied languages (including a period at the University of Bern studying Old High German). He attended the congress in the Hague in 1948 from which the European Movement sprang, and was President of the Oxford Union Society in 1949.

== Career ==
In the early 1950s he was diplomatic correspondent on the Kemsley Newspapers (part of Ian Fleming's Mercury News Service). He also wrote for The Sunday Times. After his election to Parliament, he continued to write freelance with regular contributions to (among others) The Daily Telegraph, National and English Review, Blackwood's, The Spectator, and Trenton Times (United States), and from 1961, to German press and television. He made documentary films for J. Arthur Rank and frequently broadcast on British radio and television.

At the 1955 general election, he was elected as Member of Parliament (MP) for Gravesend, defeating outgoing MP Sir Richard Acland, who had left the Labour Party to stand as an independent candidate. Kirk was re-elected in Gravesend at the 1959 election, but lost his seat at the 1964 general election to Labour's Albert Murray.

In February 1965, the former Conservative Chancellor and Deputy Prime Minister Rab Butler was elevated to the peerage and thereby gave up his parliamentary seat in Saffron Walden. Kirk was the successful candidate at the March 1965 by-election, and retained the seat until his death.

Under Alec Douglas-Home's premiership, Kirk was Under-Secretary of State for War from 1963 to 1964. When the Conservatives regained power in 1970, Prime Minister Edward Heath appointed him as Under-Secretary for Defence for the Royal Navy from 1970 to 1973, during which time he visited every British naval establishment both at home and abroad. He led the first Tory delegation to the European Parliament in 1973, a mixed team of peers and MPs who retained their Parliamentary seats and workload on a dual mandate.

Kirk's main interests were in foreign affairs and defence, being a British Parliamentary representative on the Council of Europe from 1956-1963 and again from 1966-1970. He served on the British-American Parliamentary delegation and various committees of the Western European Union. Having been too young to fight in World War II (although greatly affected by it), he heard Winston Churchill's call for a United States of Europe in September 1946, and devoted much of his career to bringing this about.

He was opposed to the British intervention in Suez in 1956, but a strong supporter of Britain's entry into the then Common Market in 1973, and a leading campaigner to keep the country there in the 1975 referendum.

A fluent German and French speaker, he particularly admired the way that the Germans had reconstructed their country and developed a peaceful, stable and well-run political system in the aftermath of 1945. At home he campaigned vigorously for the abolition of the death penalty.

He detested dictatorships of any kind and greatly lamented the loss of eastern Europe to communism; he was a firm believer that Europe's destiny included the communist states of eastern Europe, although he did not live to see them included in NATO or the European Union.

== Death ==
Kirk was knighted in 1976. He had a heart attack that same year, and died from a second heart attack on 17 April 1977, at his home in Steeple Bumpstead. His election agent blamed his death on overwork resulting from his dual mandate as both MP for Saffron Walden and Member of the European Parliament.

The by-election for his Saffron Walden seat was won by the Conservative candidate Alan Haselhurst. The Peter Kirk Memorial Fund was set up in his honour, to give scholarships to young people to study modern Europe and its institutions.

== Personal life ==
A devout Anglican, he was a delegate to the World Council of Churches in Delhi in 1961. His publications included One Army Strong (Faith Press, 1958) and a monograph on T.S. Eliot in Thirteen for Christ (ed. Melville Harcourt, Sheed & Ward, 1963)

He was married in August 1950 to Elizabeth Mary, daughter of Richard Brockbank Graham and Gertrude (née Anson). They had three sons, including Matthew Kirk, who was later the British Ambassador to Finland.

Parliament of the United Kingdom
Preceded by Richard Acland	Member of Parliament for Gravesend; 1955–1964	Succeeded by Albert Murray
Preceded by Rab Butler	Member of Parliament for Saffron Walden; 1965–1977	Succeeded by Alan Haselhurst
Honorary titles
Preceded by Philip Clarke	Baby of the House; 1955–1956	Succeeded by Marcus Kimball
Party political offices
New office	Leader of the Conservatives in the European Parliament; 1973–1977	Succeeded by Geoffrey Rippon
