= Alan Haselhurst =

British politician (1937–2026)

The Right Honourable The Lord Haselhurst PC
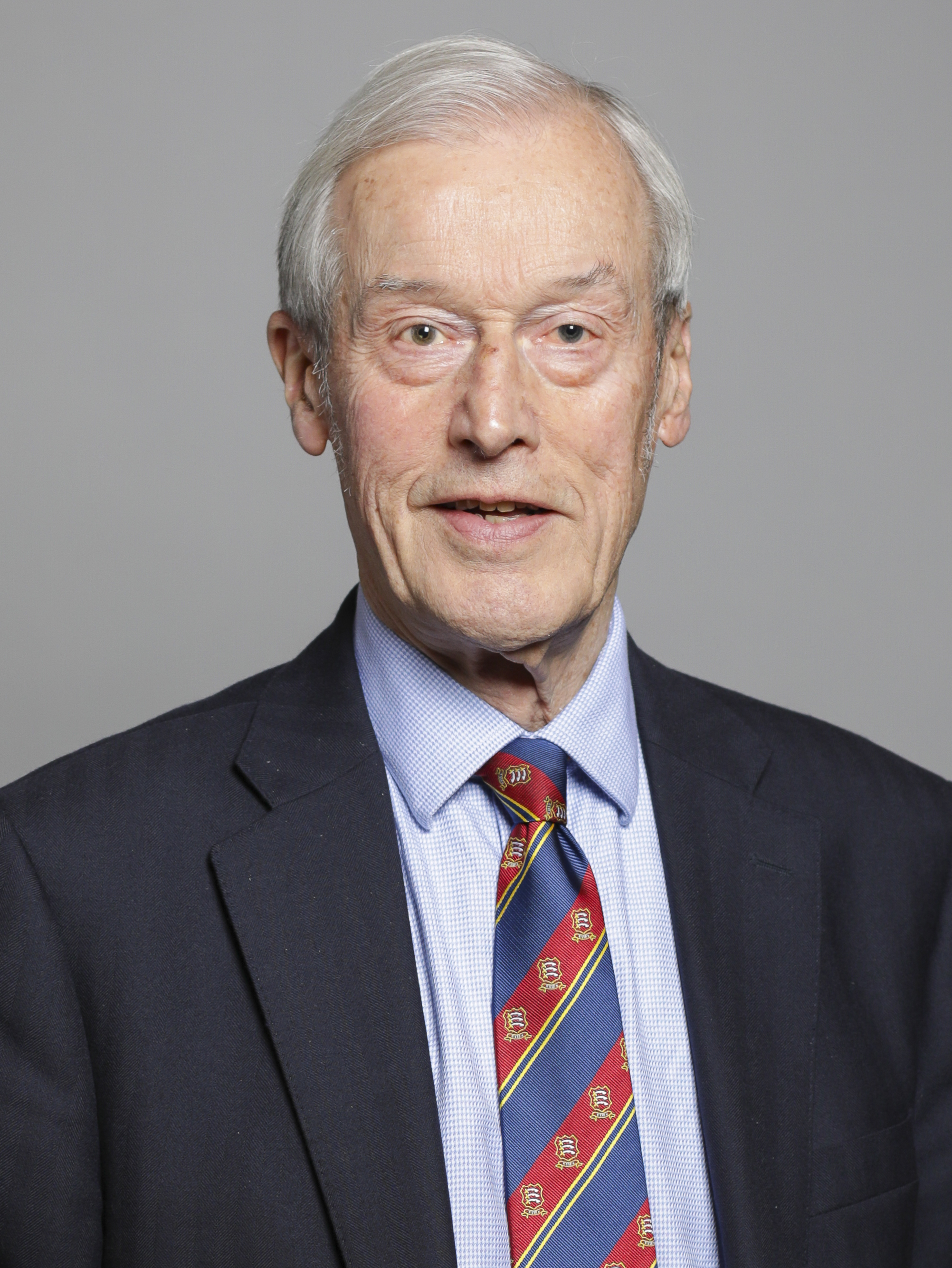
- Official portrait, 2019

Chairman of the Commonwealth Parliamentary Association
- In office 27 July 2011 – October 2014
- Deputy: Nafisa Shah
- Preceded by: Shafie Apdal
- Succeeded by: Shirin Sharmin Chaudhury

Chairman of the Administration Committee
- In office 27 July 2010 – 30 March 2015
- Preceded by: Frank Doran
- Succeeded by: Paul Beresford

Deputy Speaker of the House of Commons; Chairman of Ways and Means
- In office 14 May 1997 – 8 June 2010
- Speaker: Betty Boothroyd; Michael Martin; John Bercow
- First Deputy: Michael Martin; Sylvia Heal; Nigel Evans
- Second Deputy: Michael Lord; Dawn Primarolo
- Preceded by: Michael Morris
- Succeeded by: Lindsay Hoyle

Member of the House of Lords
- Lord Temporal
- Life peerage 22 June 2018 – 20 December 2024

Member of Parliament
- In office 7 July 1977 – 3 May 2017
- Preceded by: Peter Kirk
- Succeeded by: Kemi Badenoch
- Constituency: Saffron Walden
- In office 18 June 1970 – 8 February 1974
- Preceded by: Denis Coe
- Succeeded by: Jim Callaghan
- Constituency: Middleton and Prestwich

Personal details
- Born: Alan Gordon Barraclough Haselhurst; 23 June 1937 South Elmsall, West Riding of Yorkshire, England
- Died: 1 June 2026 (aged 88)
- Party: Conservative
- Spouse: Angela Bailey (m. 1977)
- Children: 3
- Education: Oriel College, Oxford

Alan Gordon Barraclough Haselhurst, Baron Haselhurst, PC (23 June 1937 – 1 June 2026) was a British Conservative politician who served as Member of Parliament (MP) for Saffron Walden from 1977 to 2017, having previously represented Middleton and Prestwich from 1970 to 1974. Haselhurst was Chairman of Ways and Means from 1997 to 2010, and later chairman of the Commonwealth Parliamentary Association between 2011 and 2014.

The oldest Conservative MP to stand down at the 2017 general election, he was created a life peer in 2018, taking his seat in the House of Lords as Baron Haselhurst.

== Early life and career ==
Haselhurst was born at South Elmsall, near Hemsworth, Yorkshire, and educated at King Edward's School, Birmingham, then Cheltenham College in Gloucestershire, before going up to Oriel College, Oxford.

Elected President of the Oxford University Conservative Association in 1958, for two years, he also served as Secretary and Treasurer of the Oxford Union from 1959. Before his election to parliament, Haselhurst worked in management in the chemicals industry and became an unremunerated director when his father's pharmacy was incorporated.

Haselhurst was the election agent to Robin [Lord] Balniel, Conservative MP for Hertford, at both the 1964 and 1966 general elections. Haselhurst was elected Chairman of the National Young Conservatives in 1964, serving for two years, later becoming Chairman of the Commonwealth Youth Exchange Council (1978–81).

== Parliamentary career ==
=== 1970–1997 ===
Haselhurst was elected to the House of Commons at the 1970 general election for the Lancashire seat of Middleton and Prestwich, defeating the sitting Labour MP Denis Coe by 1,042 votes. In parliament, he briefly served from 1973 as Parliamentary Private Secretary (PPS) to the Home Secretary Robert Carr, before losing his seat in February 1974. Haselhurst lost the seat to Labour by only 517 votes; he then served as the Chairman of the Manchester Youth and Community Service from 1974 until 1977 upon re-entering the Commons; the Conservative MP for the Essex seat of Saffron Walden, Sir Peter Kirk, died on 17 April 1977. Selected to contest the resulting by-election on 7 July, Haselhurst retained the seat for the Conservatives with an increased majority of 12,437, and was returned to Parliament as its MP at every subsequent election until his retirement in 2017.

Following the Conservatives' return to power at the 1979 general election, Haselhurst was appointed PPS to the Secretary of State for Education and Science Mark Carlisle serving for two years from 1979. He served on the European Legislation Select Committee for fifteen years from 1982, and was a member of the Transport Select Committee from 1992 to 1997. He had the distinction of asking the first question in Margaret Thatcher's final Prime Minister's Questions on 27 November 1990.

=== 1997–2017 ===
Following the 1997 general election, Haselhurst was elected Chairman of Ways and Means (Deputy Speaker), remaining in post under successive Speakers Betty Boothroyd, Michael Martin, and John Bercow until May 2010. Haselhurst was a nominated candidate to succeed Michael Martin after Martin's resignation as Commons Speaker on 19 May 2009. However, Haselhurst was among those who became embroiled in the MPs' expenses controversy being highlighted by The Daily Telegraph for claiming £12,000 in gardening expenses over four years, in the sum of £249 every month, despite taking advice from the Fees Office to simplify the submission of his expenses in this way; he made endeavours to wipe the slate clean by refunding these gardening expenses "out of respect to his constituents"

Haselhurst chose not to seek re-election as a Commons Deputy Speaker after the 2010 general election. Since, by convention, the Chairman of Ways and Means should come from a different party affiliation from the Speaker, Haselhurst would have been eligible only to stand for First Deputy Chairman, junior to his previous office. Nevertheless, his fellow parliamentarians entrusted him to continue as Interim Deputy Speaker during the period between the State Opening of Parliament and its election of new Deputy Speakers. On 27 July 2010, Haselhurst was elected Chairman of the House of Commons Administration Committee, having been defeated in the election for Chairman of the Backbench Business Committee by Natascha Engel.

In July 2010, Haselhurst became Chairman of the UK Commonwealth Parliamentary Association and then, at the Commonwealth Parliamentary Conference at London in July 2011, was elected Chairman of the Commonwealth Parliamentary Association's Executive Committee, serving until October 2014, and overseeing parliamentary procedure throughout the Commonwealth. He succeeded the Malaysian Datuk Seri Haji Shafie Apdal; the previous British parliamentarian elected to this post had been Sir Colin Shepherd in 1996.

Haselhurst was reselected as the Conservative Party candidate for the next election at a meeting of the local party association on 13 February 2014, and was again returned to Parliament at the 2015 general election.

A staunch opponent of Brexit at the 2016 referendum, in April 2017, Haselhurst announced that he would not contest the 2017 general election, after having initially indicated his intention to stand. About his change of mind he commented: "I feel now that my initial instinctive response was premature... I have begun to recognize that it might test the friendship and goodwill of so many people whose support I have enjoyed if I sought to do so for a further five years!"

A supporter of community-based projects, he was for a time a Director of Turning Point, a charity working with socially excluded young people. A europhile and ally of Kenneth Clarke, Lord Haselhurst was for a long time regarded as a one-nation Conservative.

=== House of Lords ===
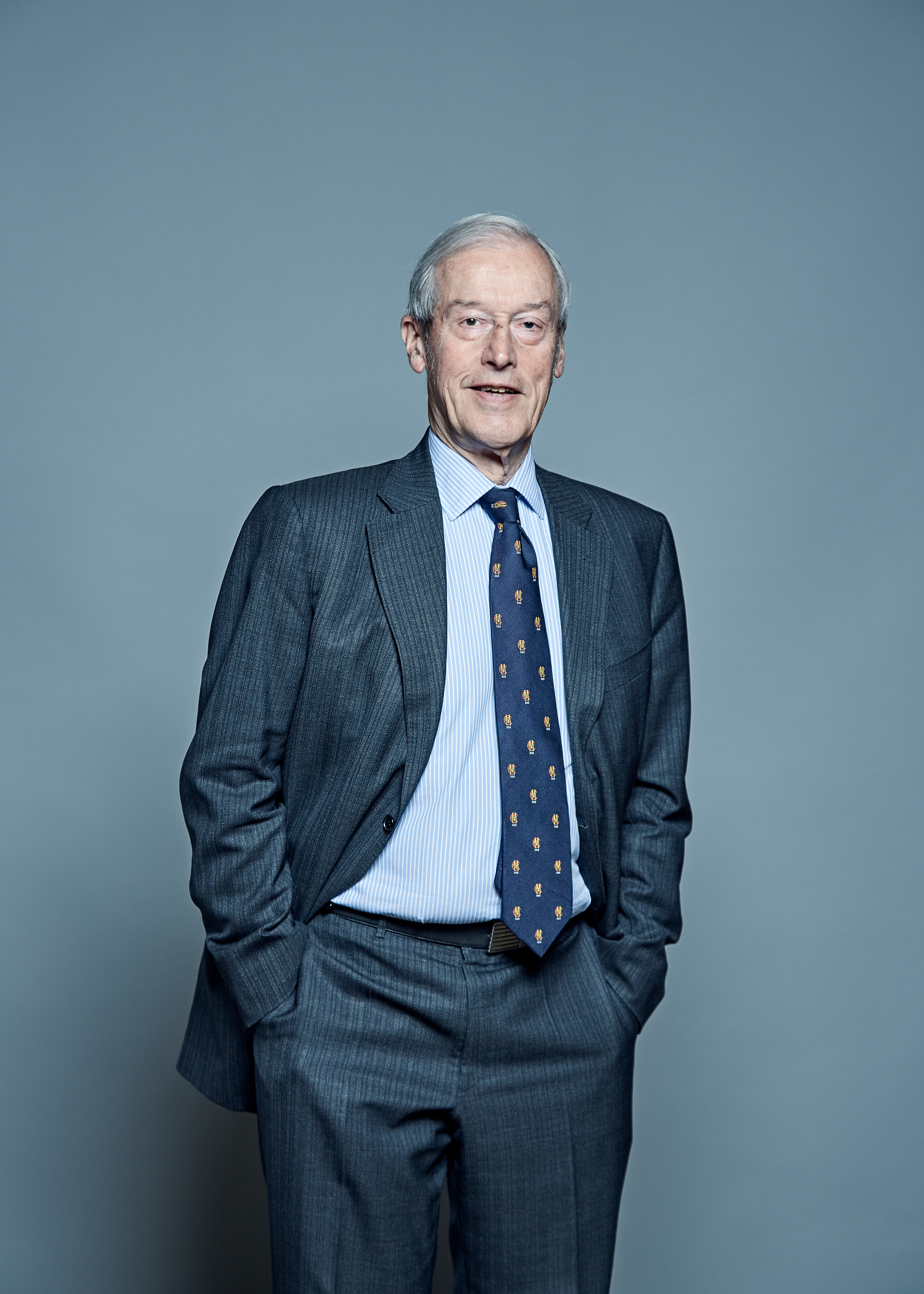
Official portrait, 2018

Nominated for elevation to the peerage on 18 May 2018, he was created by Letters Patent on 22 June, Baron Haselhurst, of Saffron Walden in the County of Essex, before being introduced to the Upper House to sit on the Conservative benches.

Lord Haselhurst retired from active politics in the House of Lords on 20 December 2024.

== Personal life and death ==
Married to Angela Margaret Bailey on 16 April 1977, Lord and Lady Haselhurst lived in Essex, having two sons and a daughter.

Knighted in 1995, Haselhurst was sworn of the Privy Council in 1999.

Having served as Secretary to the All-Party Parliamentary Group on Cricket and as a Council Member of Essex County Cricket Club from 1996 to 2008, Lord Haselhurst was also a member of Marylebone Cricket Club and well known for his writings about the Outcasts Cricket Club.

Haselhurst died on 1 June 2026, aged 88.

== Honours ==
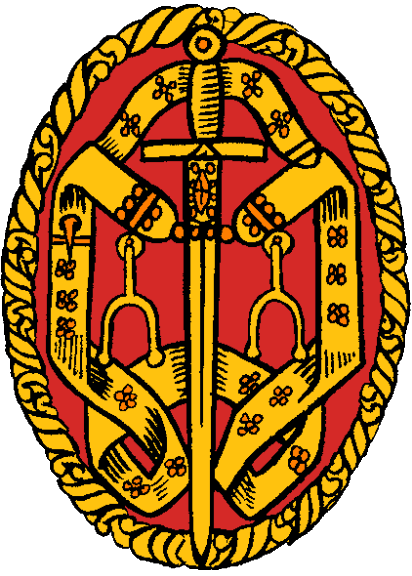
Insignia of a Knight Bachelor

- UK Baron (2018)
- Knight Bachelor (1995)

== Publications ==
- Occasionally Cricket: The Unpredictable Performances of the Outcasts CC by Alan Haselhurst, 1999, Queen Anne Press ISBN 1-85291-622-2
- Eventually Cricket by Alan Haselhurst, 2001, Queen Anne Press ISBN 1-85291-637-0
- Incidentally Cricket by Alan Haselhurst, 2003, Queen Anne Press ISBN 1-85291-655-9
- Accidentally Cricket by Alan Haselhurst, 2009, The Professional & Higher Partnership ISBN 978-1-907076-00-8
- Unusually Cricket by Alan Haselhurst, 2010, The Professional & Higher Partnership ISBN 978-1-907076-01-5
- Fatally Cricket by Alan Haselhurst, 2013, The Professional & Higher Partnership ISBN 978-1-907076-75-6
- Politically Cricket by Alan Haselhurst, 2016, The Professional & Higher Partnership ISBN 978-1-907076-90-9.

Parliament of the United Kingdom
Preceded by Denis Coe	Member of Parliament for Middleton and Prestwich; 1970–February 1974	Succeeded by Jim Callaghan
Preceded by Sir Peter Kirk	Member of Parliament for Saffron Walden; 1977–2017	Succeeded by Kemi Badenoch
Preceded by Michael Morris	Chairman of Ways and Means; 1997–2010	Succeeded by Sir Lindsay Hoyle
