= Ben Stoneham, Baron Stoneham of Droxford =

British politician

The Right Honourable The Lord Stoneham of Droxford
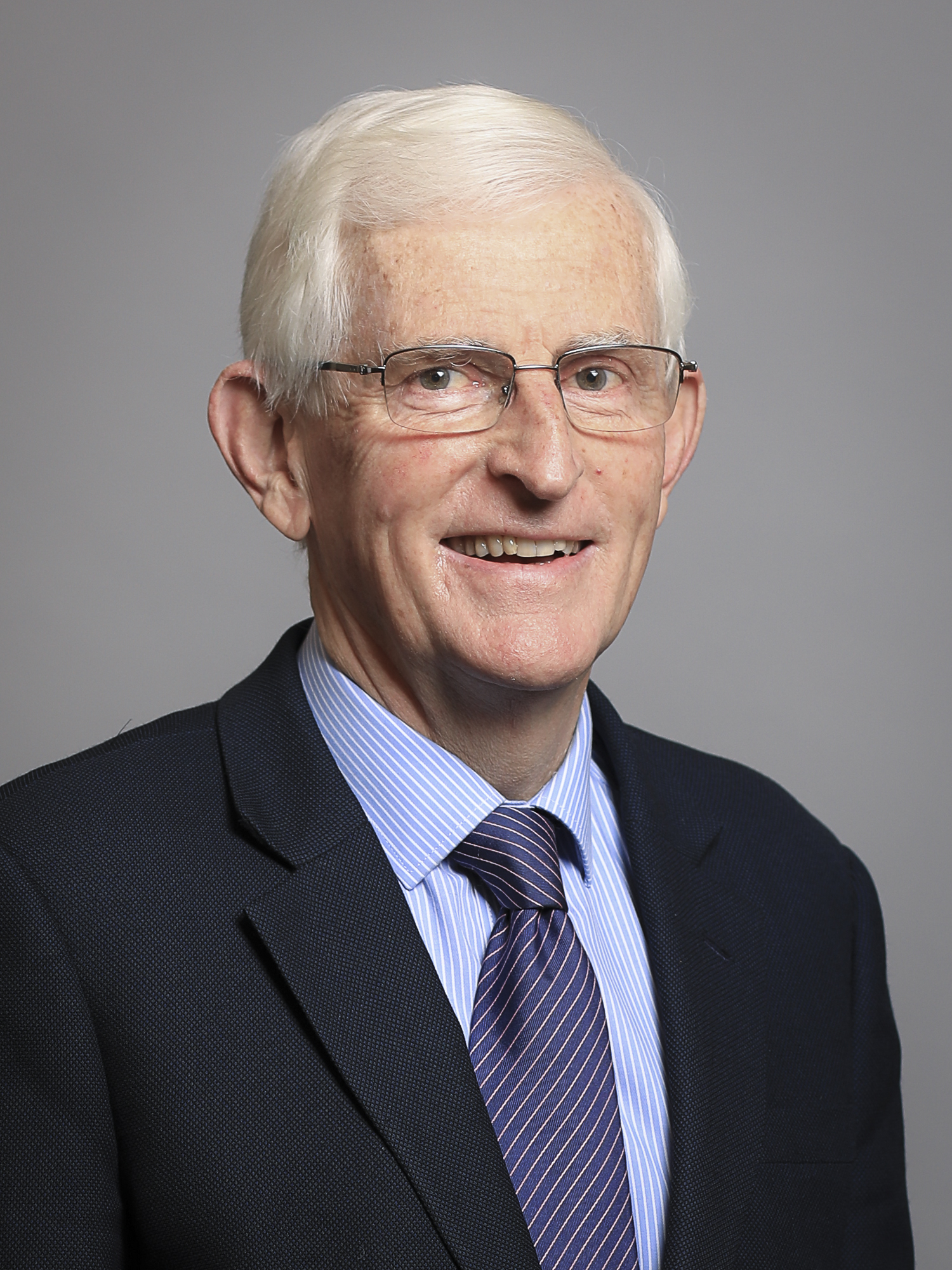
- Official portrait, 2020

Chief Whip of the Liberal Democrats in the House of Lords
- In office 13 September 2016 – 31 January 2026
- Leader: Tim Farron; Vince Cable; Jo Swinson; Ed Davey
- Preceded by: The Lord Newby
- Succeeded by: Baron Goddard of Stockport

Member of the House of Lords
- Lord Temporal
- Life peerage 17 January 2011

Personal details
- Born: 26 August 1948 (age 78)
- Party: Labour (before 1981); SDP (1981–1988); Liberal Democrats (1988–present)
- Education: Christ's College, Cambridge; University of Warwick; University of London

Benjamin Russell Mackintosh Stoneham, Baron Stoneham of Droxford (born 26 August 1948) is a British peer, journalist, and Liberal Democrat politician. He served as the Liberal Democrat Chief Whip in the House of Lords between October 2016 and January 2026.

== Education ==
He was educated at Harrow School, Christ's College, Cambridge (BA, 1970), the University of Warwick (MA, 1971) and London Business School.

== Political career ==
Stoneham's early politics were Labour. At the age of 29 he was Labour candidate in the Saffron Walden by-election of 1977. He was later treasurer of the moderate Campaign for Labour Victory, many of whose leading lights later joined the SDP. Stoneham was the SDP candidate for Parliament in Stevenage in 1983 and 1987. In 1983, he had the best finish by any non-incumbent SDP candidate in an English seat and narrowly lost by about 1,700 votes.

In 2004, he stood for election in Denmead, Winchester, and in 2010 he stood for election in Bishops Waltham, Winchester.

He is a senior party activist for the Liberal Democrat party. From 2003 to 2010, he was operations director of the party, under the leadership of Charles Kennedy, and Nick Clegg. He was made a Life peer on 17 January 2011 as Baron Stoneham of Droxford, of Meon Valley in the County of Hampshire. He gave his maiden speech on 20 January 2011.

In October 2016, Lord Stoneham was elected as the Liberal Democrat Chief Whip in the House of Lords, succeeding Lord Newby.

== Super-injunction statement ==
Lord Stoneham came to prominence on 19 May 2011 when used parliamentary privilege to reveal details of a super-injunction during a debate in the House of Lords. He questioned whether a super-injunction prevented bank regulators from investigating corporate governance at the Royal Bank of Scotland:

Every taxpayer has a direct public interest in the events leading up to the collapse of the Royal Bank of Scotland, so how can it be right for a super-injunction to hide the alleged relationship between Sir Fred Goodwin and a senior colleague.
If true, it would be a serious breach of corporate governance and not even the Financial Services Authority would be allowed to know about it.

== Reprimanded ==
Lord Stoneham was reprimanded on 27 February 2013 by his own party following reports he telephoned and angrily remonstrated with one of the women who had complained to newspapers about his close friend Lord Rennard's alleged sexual harassment of party workers. Nick Clegg's aides described Lord Stoneham's conduct as "completely unacceptable." Liberal Democrat chief whip in the House of Lords, Lord Newby gave a warning to Lord Stoneham over his conduct.

== Personal life ==
He is married to Anne Kristine Mackintosh. Lady Stoneham is appointed as Chair of The Board of Trustees of the charity St Christopher's Fellowship and a member of the Avon Tyrrell Trust. In the 2012 New Year Honours she was appointed a Member of the Order of the British Empire (MBE), for services to young people.

Party political offices
Preceded by The Lord Newby	Liberal Democrat Chief Whip of the House of Lords; 2012–2016	Incumbent
Orders of precedence in the United Kingdom
Preceded by The Lord Palmer of Childs Hill	Gentlemen; Baron Stoneham of Droxford	Followed by The Lord Fink
