= William Cash (accountant) =

English accountant and business director (1891–1964)

Sir William Cash, FCA (18 June 1891 – 4 May 1964) was an English accountant and business director.

== Biography ==
The son of William Cash of Coombe Wood, Addington, Surrey, he attended Haileybury College before going up to Balliol College, Oxford, graduating with a Bachelor of Arts degree (by convention, proceeding to MA).

He succeeded his father as senior partner in the accountancy firm Cash, Stone and Company. The Times called him "known and respected by a wide circle ... a busy chartered accountant with an extensive practice ... an able and polished speaker and a scholarly writer". He became Chairman of Abbey National Building Society and of Amalgamated Asphite Companies. He was also Chairman of the Girls' Public Day School Trust (1948–64), and managed the trust after it had fallen on financially precarious times. He was knighted in 1958 principally for his service to that organisation.

He had also been a member of the Croydon Board of Guardians and Godstone Rural District Council (1916–19) and of the Essex County Council (1925–28), and stood as the Labour candidate for Saffron Walden in the general elections of 1922, 1923, 1924 and 1929.

He was a lay reader in the Diocese of London and bursar to the Oxford and Bermondsey Mission (1914–19). He married, in 1932, Hilda Mary Napier, who died in 1962; she was the daughter of the Oxford Professor Arthur Napier.

== Likenesses ==
- Sir William Cash (1891–1964), by Elliott & Fry (bromide print). Purchased by the National Portrait Gallery, London, in 1996 (Photographs Collection, NPG x86641).
