= Max Grünhut =

German-British legal scholar (1893–1964)

- Born: 7 July 1893; Magdeburg, Prussia, German Empire
- Died: 6 February 1964 (aged 70); Oxford, England
- Scientific career
- Fields: Legal studies, criminology

Max Grünhut (7 July 1893 – 6 February 1964) was a German-British legal scholar and criminologist. Of Jewish descent, he emigrated to the United Kingdom to escape Nazism in 1939. Prior to that, he was held a professorship at the University of Bonn.

In England, he taught at the University of Oxford, becoming one of the most important British criminologists of his era, along with fellow emigrants Hermann Mannheim and Leon Radzinowicz.

== Works ==
- ——— (1948). Penal Reform: a Comparative Study. Oxford.
