= Hermann Mannheim =

British-German criminologist

Hermann Mannheim (1889–1974) was a German-British criminologist.

Mannheim fled Germany in the mid-1930s and took up a lecturing post at the London School of Economics. After the Second World War, he became a professor at the LSE.

He published a number of influential books in criminology, including the two-volume textbook, Comparative Criminology (1965). Mannheim was an editor and cofounder of the British Journal of Criminology (1950–1966).

The Mannheim Centre for Criminology at the London School of Economics is named after him.

== Biography ==
Mannheim was born to Wilhelm Mannheim, who worked at a firm in Libau, Latvia, and Clara Marcuse. From age 9 to 18, Mannheim attended school at the classical gymnasium in Tilsit. He went on to study law and political science at the Ludwig-Maximilians-Universität München, the University of Freiburg, the University of Strasbourg, and the University of Koenigsberg. He submitted his doctoral thesis in 1912, undertaken at Koenigsberg.

After qualifying as a barrister and during World War I, Mannheim served in the German artillery before being made judge of a court-martial. He married Mona Mark in 1919. From 1919 to 2023, Mannheim worked as a legal advisor in local government and on industrial cases. He took up a law lectureship at the Friedrich Wilhelm University of Berlin and was promoted to Professor extraordinarius in 1929. As a judge, he rose through the ranks of the Prussian court system.

When the Nazis came to power, Mannheim no longer saw a future for himself in German law. He and his wife relocated to London in January 1934. After improving his English and familiarising himself with the local legal system, Mannheim joined the London School of Economics (LSE) in 1935. He became a naturalised British citizen in 1940.
