= 1977 Saffron Walden by-election =

UK parliamentary by-election

← Oct. 1974	7 July 1977	1979 →

Constituency of Saffron Walden
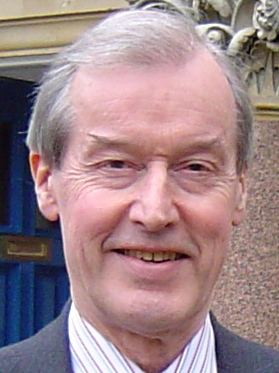

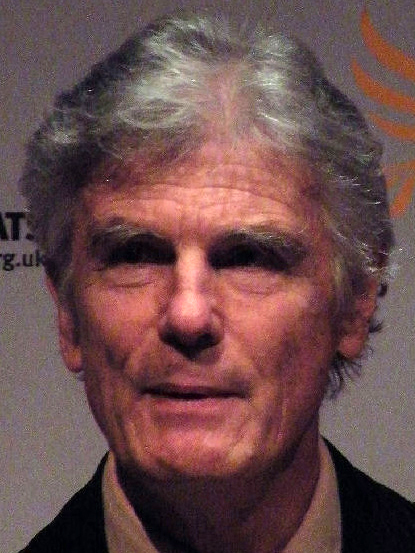

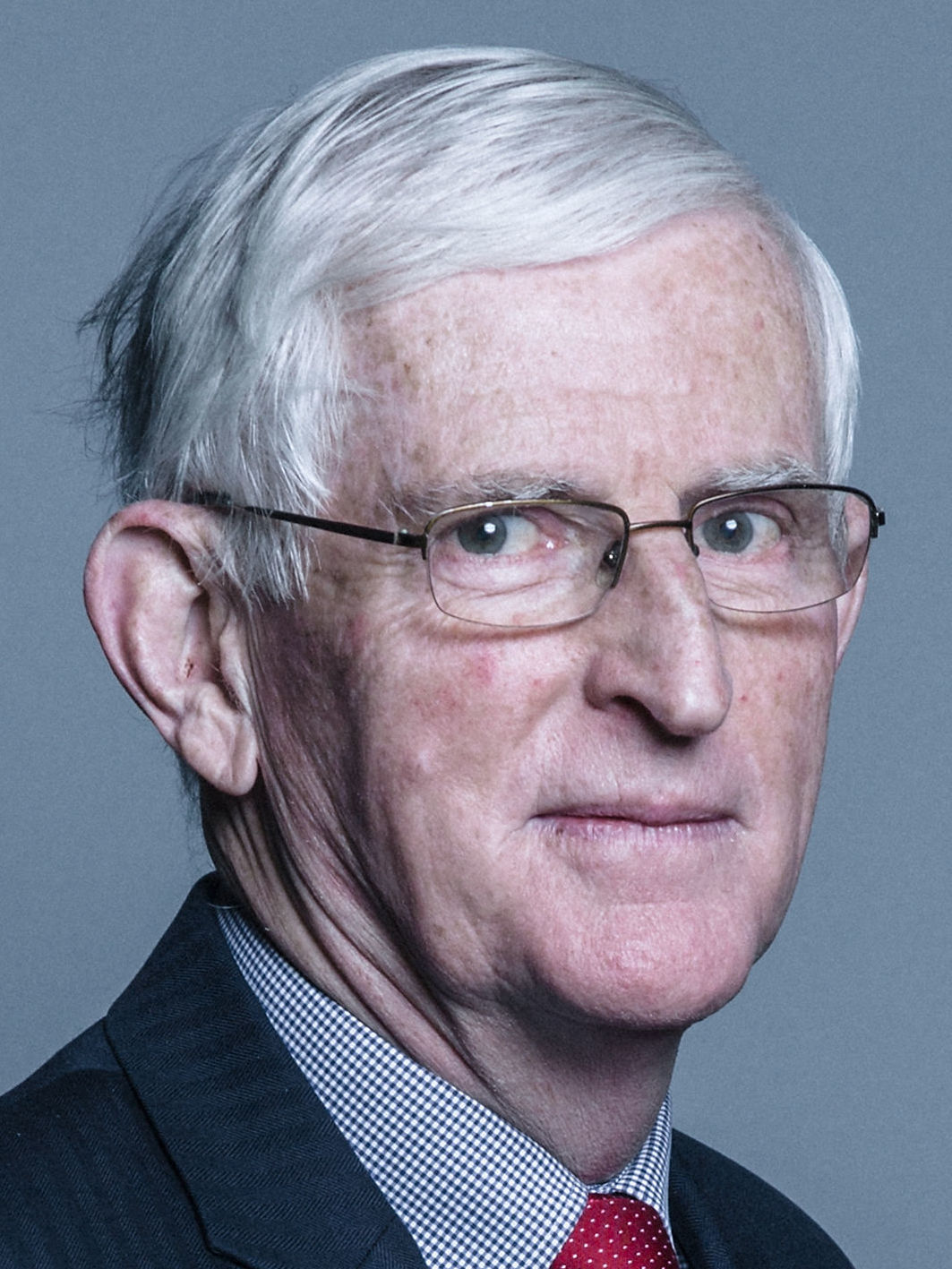
	First party	Second party	Third party
Candidate	Alan Haselhurst	Andrew Phillips	Ben Stoneham
Party	Conservative	Liberal	Labour
Popular vote	22,692	10,255	5,948
Percentage	55.74%	25.19%	14.61%
Swing	▲12.03%	▼5.13%	▼11.36%
MP before election
Peter Kirk
Conservative
Elected MP
Alan Haselhurst
Conservative

The 1977 Saffron Walden by-election of 7 July 1977 was held after the death of Conservative Member of Parliament (MP) Sir Peter Kirk on 16 April that year. The Conservatives held on to the seat in the by-election.

== Result ==
Saffron Walden by-election, 7 July 1977
Party	Candidate	Votes	%	±%
Conservative	Alan Haselhurst	22,692	55.74	+12.03
Liberal	Andrew Phillips	10,255	25.19	−5.13
Labour	Ben Stoneham	5,948	14.61	−11.36
All Party Anti-Common Market	Oliver Smedley	1,818	4.47	New
Majority		12,437	30.55	+17.16
Turnout		40,713		
Conservative hold		Swing		
