= 1901 Saffron Walden by-election =

1901 UK parliamentary by-election

The 1901 Saffron Walden by-election was a by-election held on 31 May 1901 for the British House of Commons constituency of Saffron Walden in Essex.

== Vacancy ==
The by-election was caused by the death on 1 May 1901, at the age of 40, of the sitting Liberal MP for the constituency Armine Wodehouse. Wodehouse was the son of sometime Foreign Secretary John Wodehouse, 1st Earl of Kimberley and had held the Saffron Walden seat since the general election of 1900.

== Candidates ==
=== Liberals ===
Saffron Walden Liberals selected as their candidate Jack Pease. Pease had been Liberal MP for the Tyneside Division of Northumberland from 1892 to 1900 when he lost his seat at that year's general election. During his time in Parliament, Pease had been private secretary to John Morley when he was Chief Secretary for Ireland. In the by-election, Pease had the support of the wine-merchant and philanthropist Sir Walter Gilbey from nearby Bishop's Stortford who promised to address a meeting of farmers on Pease's behalf.

=== Conservatives ===
The Unionists chose Charles Wing Gray, an Essex farmer whose home was at Halstead. Gray had twice contested the seat before. At the 1895 election he had reduced the Liberal majority from 1,881 to 425 and in 1900 he had brought it down to just 110. He had continued working locally to try and eliminate it altogether and must have had high hopes of victory at the by-election. Saffron Walden had at this time a reputation as a town with strong Quaker influences and a prominent member of the Society of Friends, E B Gibson, was one of Gray's nominators.

== Issues ==
=== Agriculture ===
Saffron Walden constituency at this time was a large rural entity, stretching across north Essex from Hertfordshire to Suffolk with the town itself the only real centre of population, the rest of the division being made up of 86 scattered villages. Unsurprisingly then, agricultural questions loomed large with the electorate. The dominant message from the Unionists was the need for the election of an Essex man with a practical understanding of the needs of agriculture and farming. They also painted Pease as someone who had done damage to agriculture by voting in previous Parliaments against resolutions introduced in the agricultural interest. They quoted in particular Pease's support for an increase in death duties which had led estate owners to reduce outgoings, discharging servants and agricultural labourers. They also attacked Pease for his opposition in 1896 to the Agricultural Rating Act, designed to reduce the burden of rates on agricultural land. Pease found himself under attack from the local branch of the Rural Labourers' League which openly declared itself for Gray. The League had been founded by Jesse Collings, a former Liberal MP who opposed Irish Home Rule and became a Liberal Unionist. Collings had always supported agricultural causes and land reform including the provision of allotments and the campaigns characterised by the slogan Three acres and a cow. The Rural Labourers' League brought up the failure of former Liberal governments to legislate for the provision of allotments, despite alleged promises to do so and also challenged Pease on his position on Home Rule, underscoring its Liberal Unionist heritage, even though this seemed to have little resonance as an issue among other electors. In return, Pease made play of the government's proposals for a sugar tax and the addition to labourers' household expenses this was likely to bring.

Sir Walter Gilbey made good his promise to speak for Pease but the start of the meeting did not go well. It had been advertised as a meeting for farmers but there were many present who were townspeople and probably some from outside the area. This led to protests and a walk-out by the farmers attending, leaving large sections of the hall empty. Holding their own meeting in Saffron Walden market place, the farmers objected that the meeting had been organised to give the impression that farmers were supporting the Radical candidate, which many clearly had no intention of doing. They pledged their support to Mr Gray and had probably determined to walk out or demonstrate for the Conservative at some point no matter what. Pease continued to campaign against the importation of foreign agricultural products and the need for government action to help make the land more productive. He accused the government of indifference to agriculture, which he claimed was more intensely felt in Essex than any other county. In his election address Pease alleged that rate relief was not applied fairly, with rich accommodation land elsewhere benefitting at the expense of arable land such as predominated in Essex. He also complained of the unequal burden of increased taxation on workers and labourers.

=== The war in South Africa ===
The Boer War was a divisive issue in British politics at the turn of the 20th century. The war had resulted in the victory of the Conservative Party in the 1900 general election, which was dubbed the Khaki election. But what had at first been seen as a brief Imperial engagement turned slowly into a protracted and bloody conflict. Opposition to the War was strengthened by the use of concentration camps by the British Army against the Dutch civilian population. This policy was eventually characterised by Liberal leader Sir Henry Campbell-Bannerman as 'methods of barbarism'. Gray was determined to play the khaki card again and held a meeting at Saffron Walden Town Hall on 29 May 1901 with the Marquis of Graham and D J Morgan MP in support. Graham described the war as a clash between civilization and progress (on the British side) and slavery, bribery and corruption on the Boer side. He jingoistically declared that the struggle to decide who should 'boss' South Africa, British or Dutch, would be fought to the finish regardless of cost.

It seems likely that some traditional Liberal voters may have felt unwilling to vote against a popular, patriotic war in 1900 and consequently supported the Tory at that general election. By May 1901 however the shine was starting to come off the military brass. A Liberal supporting election leaflet, "A Soldier’s Indictment of the Present Government" signed by “Tommy Atkins” was circulating in the last days of the contest. The Liberal candidate, Jack Pease, was from the Imperialist part of the party which was happy to support the Boer War in principle.

== Result ==
Pease held the seat for the Liberals with an increased majority. In 1900, Armine Wodehouse's majority over Gray had been 110. Pease increased this to 792 at the by-election. While a Liberal victory in a seat which had been Liberal since its creation for the 1885 general election could have been anticipated, the size of the win was larger than forecast.

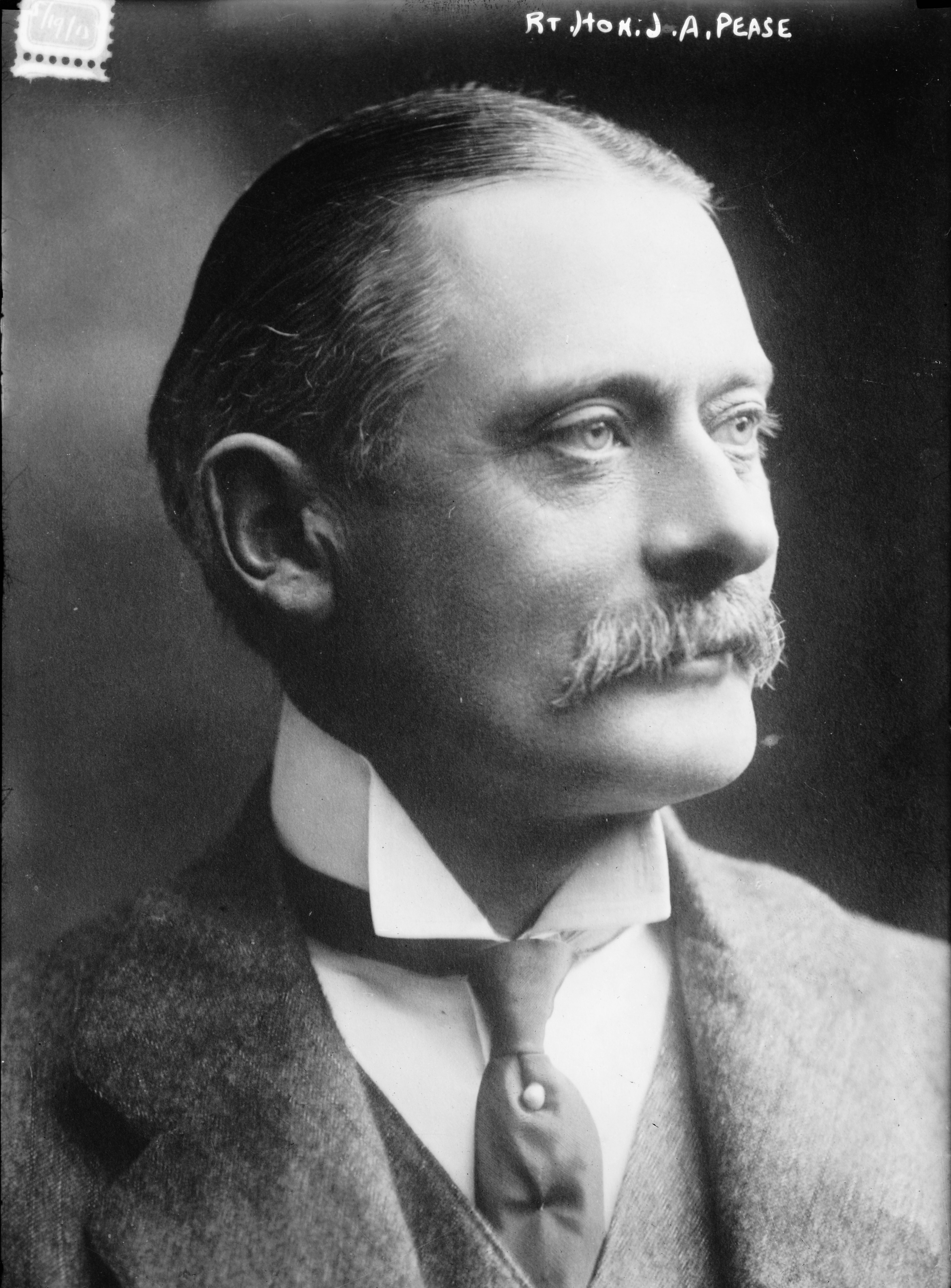
Jack Pease

Saffron Walden by-election, 1901
Party	Candidate	Votes	%	±%
Liberal	Jack Pease	3,994	55.5	+4.6
Conservative	Charles Wing Gray	3,202	44.5	−4.6
Majority		792	11.0	+9.2
Turnout		7,196	84.2	+7.6
Liberal hold		Swing	+4.6	

Once the result was declared, the Conservatives pleaded a lack of voter registration and organisation in the run-up to the poll but Gray had fought the seat in 1895 and 1900 and had made inroads into the Liberal majority. In addition, Gray was the local candidate compared with the carpetbagger Pease looking for a safe Parliamentary billet having been ousted by the voters of Tyneside and with no local credentials. It seems the impact of the Boer War was wearing off as an electoral asset for the Tories and the agricultural issues seemed to work in favour of the Liberals, particularly the concerns about the impact of the sugar tax on those with low wages in the countryside. It is possible that, as is usual in politics, the electorate may have been beginning to turn against the government, which had by this time been in office for six years. However other by-election results around this time in agricultural seats were not as propitious for the Liberals and saw an increase in the Unionist vote.
