= Anti Common Market and Free Trade Party =

The Anti Common Market and Free Trade Party was a British political party that opposed Britain's membership of the European Union and fought a number of by-elections in the 1970s and 1980s. It was also known as the Free Trade Liberal Party and All Party Anti-Common Market. Among its members were Arthur Seldon and Oliver Smedley. It saw itself in the Liberal Party tradition and its members were often involved with the free market Institute of Economic Affairs.

By-elections contested included:

- 1967 Walthamstow West by-election
- 1972 Sutton and Cheam by-election
- 1973 Lincoln by-election (As Democratic Conservative)
- 1977 Saffron Walden by-election
- 1979 South West Hertfordshire by-election
- 1980 Southend East by-election
- 1981 Croydon North West by-election
- 1983 Bermondsey by-election
- 1988 Kensington by-election
