= Charles Gold (politician) =

British company director, landowner and politician

Charles Gold

Sir Charles Gold JP DL (1837 – 2 November 1924) was a British company director, landowner and Liberal Party politician. He was Member of Parliament for Saffron Walden from 1895 to 1900.

== Background ==
Gold was born the son of Michael Gold, of Birmingham. In 1859 he married Fanny Georgina Gilbey. They had thirteen children; seven sons and six daughters. He was knighted in 1906. He was appointed a Deputy Lieutenant for Essex on 20 February 1900, and served as a Justice of the peace.

== Professional career ==
Gold was a director of his brother-in-law Walter Gilbey's wine and spirits retail company, W. and A. Gilbey. He owned property in Stansted, Essex

== Political career ==
Gold was selected as Liberal candidate for the Saffron Walden division of Essex for the 1895 General Election. Saffron Walden was already a Liberal seat, so his election to parliament was expected. He served for one parliamentary term before retiring in 1900. He did not stand for parliament again. He continued to support the Liberal Party, being a major financial contributor to the party in Saffron Walden in 1906. In 1910 he left the Liberals to join the Conservatives due to his opposition to Lloyd George's People's Budget that introduced new taxes on landowners.
