= 1964 Ugandan lost counties referendum =

Ugandan referendum

Modern day Kibaale District, comprising Buyaga and Bugangaizi counties

The lost counties referendum of November 1964 was a local referendum held to decide whether the "lost counties" of Buyaga and Bugangaizi in Uganda (modern day Kibaale District) should continue to be part of the Kingdom of Buganda, be transferred back to the Kingdom of Bunyoro, or be established as a separate district. The electorate, consisting of the residents of the two counties at the time of independence, voted overwhelmingly to be returned to Bunyoro.

== Background ==
In 1893–1894, British colonel Henry Colvile invaded the Kingdom of Bunyoro in an effort to secure and expand the nascent Uganda Protectorate, which initially included solely the Kingdom of Buganda. Colvile promised all lands south of the River Kafu to Buganda in return for their support, and following the conflict the relevant counties were duly transferred as promised, with the transfer recognised in the Buganda Agreement (1900). Despite deliberate attempts by the Bugandan government to integrate the resident Banyoro, the return of the 'lost counties' was the subject of repeated appeals from the Bunyoro government to the British government.

The potential for conflict between the two Kingdoms was therefore still a considerable cause for concern in the run up to independence amid considerable violence. In 1961, the Uganda Relationships Commission, under the leadership of the Earl of Munster, was tasked with looking into the issue. It proposed that a referendum should be held in three of the disputed counties: Buyaga and Bugangaizi (the two counties which retained the strongest cultural and ethnic ties to Bunyoro) and a third county of Bunyoro's choice. This would "put [Bunyoro's] claims to the test in a county where the figures appear to be against her so that Bunyoro would have no grievance in future based upon unqualified success in a strictly limited referendum". In the talks leading up to Ugandan Constitutional Conference of September and October 1961, neither Bunyoro nor Buganda looked favourably on such a proposition: Bunyoro favoured a referendum in all the lost counties and Buganda a referendum in none. Bunyoro only agreed to participate in the Conference if the 'lost counties' issue was on the agenda; and when the British Colonial Secretary Ian Macleod suggested that the proposed referendum could not proceed given the lack of Bugandan support, and instead proposed the establishment of a further Commission of Privy Councillors, Bunyoro's delegates walked out.

The Bunyoro government was deeply unhappy with the perceived lack of progress. On 15 October, the Rukurato (Parliament of Bunyoro) passed a resolution to the effect that from midnight on 18 October they would simply treat the lost counties as though they had reverted to Bunyoro, though this had little practical effect.

The Commission, under the leadership of Lord Molson, arrived in Uganda on 8 January 1962 and reported to the British government in March 1962. Publication of its findings was however delayed until after the Ugandan general election and it was finally published in May. The final report favoured the transfer of two of the lost counties to Bunyoro, in exchange for Bunyoro dropping their claim on the remaining counties; it did not favour holding a referendum for fear of further violence. The report was met with outcry in the Bugandan parliament.

== Prelude ==
Without any sign of agreement between the Kingdoms of Bunyoro and Buganda, the terms of the final settlement were dictated by the new British Colonial Secretary Reginald Maudling and set out in the conclusions of the Uganda Independence Conference held at Marlborough House in June 1962. As finalised in the resultant Uganda (Independence) Order, a referendum would be held in Buyaga and Bugangaizi counties only. Voters would be asked whether the two counties should continue to be part of Buganda, be transferred back to Bunyoro, or be established as a separate district. The referendum could not take place before 9 October 1964 (i.e. for two years after independence). For those two years, the counties were to be administered directly by the central government. At Second Reading of the Uganda Independence Bill, Hugh Fraser set out the British Government's rationale:

Some hon. Members may suggest that, as we were unable to implement the ideal solution put forward by the Molson Report [concerning the lost counties], the date of independence should have been delayed. I must disagree, and disagree most strongly, for here, I think, two matters must be paramount in our minds, first, the desire of the 6½ million people of Uganda to proceed swiftly to independence, and, secondly, looking back at history, the necessity of avoiding a civil war. It was for this reason that the Secretary of State decided that both countries, whilst remaining within the boundaries of Buganda, should have their administration taken over by a third force, the central Government. By doing this, I believe that we shall give the 60,000 people who live there security for the immediate future, and neutralise the threat to peace and good order in Uganda during the first years of independence. A period of impartial administration should create conditions in which a referendum can one day be held.

— Hugh Fraser, Parliamentary Under Secretary of State for the Colonial Office, Hansard (16 July 1962), col. 33

The holding of a referendum was confirmed through the introduction of a Bill by the ruling Uganda People's Congress party (UPC) in August 1964. The Referendum (Buyaga and Bugangaizi) Bill set a date of 4 November 1964. It also restricted the franchise to only those citizens living in the counties at the point of independence. This angered the Bugandan government, which had spent 1963 and early 1964 embarking on an expensive resettlement scheme (the Ndaiga Scheme) to bolster the number of Baganda living in Buyaga.

The introduction of the Bill coincided with the formal dissolution of the UPC's alliance with the Kabaka Yekka (KY) party of Bugandan monarchists, and several KY members walked out in protest. The Kabaka himself, Edward Mutesa II, had recently been elected by the Parliament of Uganda as President, and refused to sign the Bill. Alternative arrangements were therefore made for the Prime Minister, Milton Obote, to sign the Bill into law. The arrangements for the referendum were subject to unsuccessful litigation led by the Bugandan government; a final appeal to the Judicial Committee of the Privy Council in London was still outstanding at the point of the referendum.

For the purposes of the referendum, the two counties were divided into 72 polling stations.

== Result ==
The referendum went ahead on 4 November 1964 as planned. The result went overwhelmingly in favour of returning the two counties to the Kingdom of Bunyoro. In Buyaga, 86% of voters favoured reunion with Bunyoro, as did 60% or 70% of voters in Bugangaizi. The Constitution of Uganda (Third Amendment) Bill was introduced to the Parliament of Uganda to give effect to the result, with the Kabaka again refusing to sign it in January 1965. Again, it had to be signed into law by Obote. The result was subject to further (unsuccessful) litigation.

The loss of the two counties reduced the number of saza (county) chiefs by two, and hence restricted the availability of patronage opportunities in Buganda. It also reduced the tax base by 3–4%. The referendum result was met with considerable violence in Buganda. The administration in Buganda, led by Katikkiro Michael Kintu, lost a vote of no confidence and resigned on 9 November.
