= Chairman of the Conservative Party =

Position of the Conservative Party in the United Kingdom

- Logo for the Conservative Party

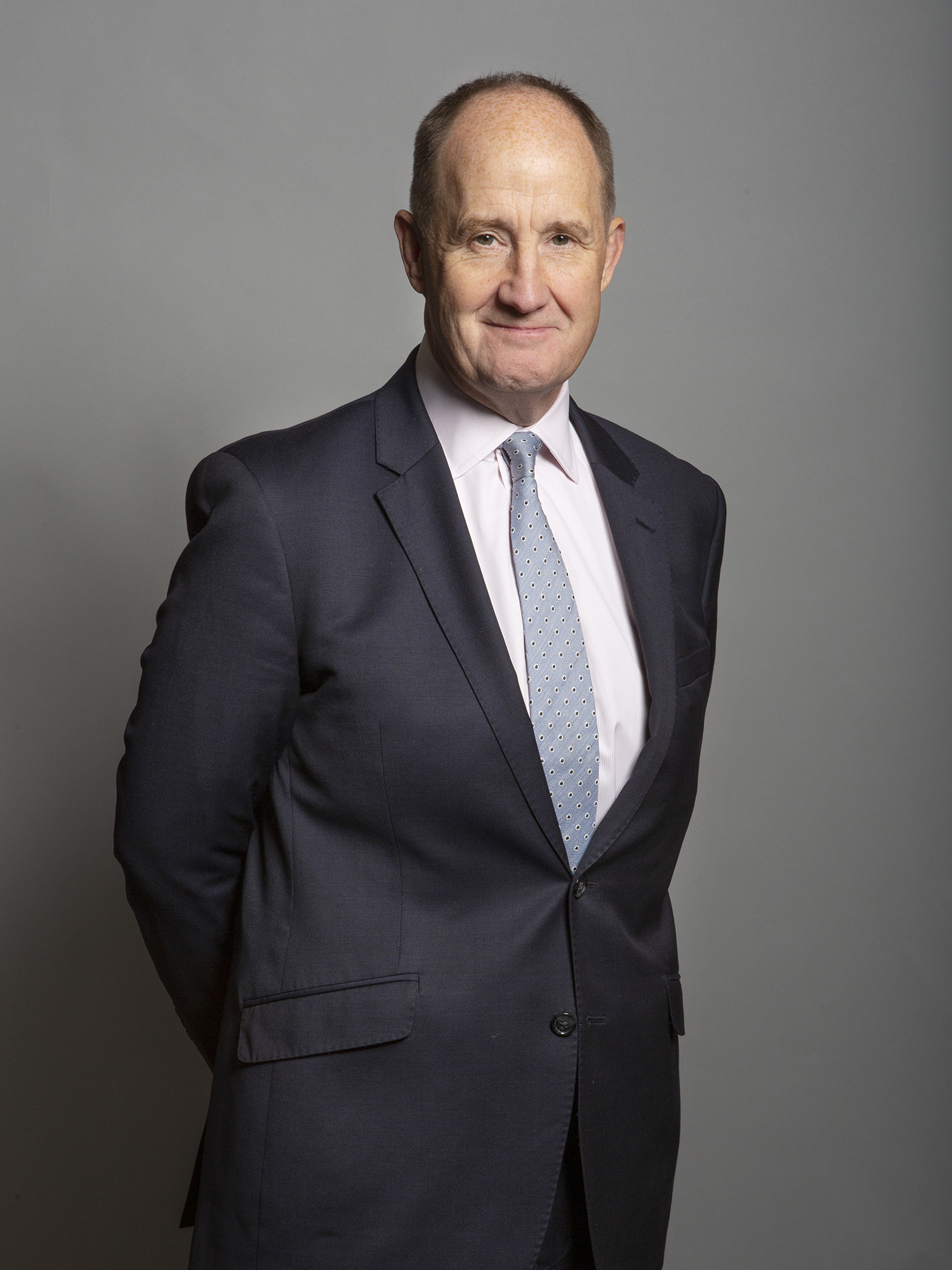
- Incumbent; Kevin Hollinrake since 22 July 2025
- Appointer: Leader of the Conservative Party
- Term length: At the pleasure of the leader of the Conservative Party
- Inaugural holder: Arthur Steel-Maitland
- Formation: 1911
- Deputy: Matt Vickers

The chairman of the Conservative Party in the United Kingdom is responsible for party administration and overseeing the Conservative Campaign Headquarters, formerly Conservative Central Office.

When the Conservatives are in government, the officeholder is usually a member of the Cabinet holding a sinecure position such as minister without portfolio. Deputy or Vice Chairmen of the Conservative Party may also be appointed, with responsibility for specific aspects of the party.

The current Deputy Chairman is Matt Vickers.

The role was created in 1911 in response to the Conservative Party's defeat in the second 1910 general election. The position is not subject to election, as it is given by the party leader.

== List ==
=== Key ===
Member of the House of Commons
Member of the House of Lords
Non-parliamentarian

=== List ===
Chairman	Term of office		Election	Ministerial offices	Leader	Ref
Arthur Steel-Maitland; MP for Birmingham East	1911	1916	—		Bonar Law	
Sir George Younger, 1st Baronet; MP for Ayr Burghs	1916	1923	1918; 1922; 1923		Bonar Law	
Sir George Younger, 1st Baronet; MP for Ayr Burghs	1916	1923	1918; 1922; 1923		Stanley Baldwin	
Stanley Jackson; MP for Howdenshire	1923	1926	1924		Stanley Baldwin	
John Davidson; MP for Hemel Hempstead	1926	1930	1929		Stanley Baldwin	
Neville Chamberlain; MP for Birmingham Edgbaston	23 June 1930	15 April 1931	—		Stanley Baldwin	
John Baird; 1st Viscount Stonehaven	1931	1936	1931; 1935		Stanley Baldwin	
Sir Douglas Hacking; MP for Chorley	1936	1942	—		Stanley Baldwin	
Sir Douglas Hacking; MP for Chorley	1936	1942	—		Neville Chamberlain	
Sir Douglas Hacking; MP for Chorley	1936	1942	—		Winston Churchill	
Thomas Dugdale; MP for Richmond	1942	29 October 1944	—		Winston Churchill	
Ralph Assheton; MP for City of London	29 October 1944	1 July 1946	1945		Winston Churchill	
Frederick Marquis; 1st Earl of Woolton	1 July 1946	1 November 1955	1950; 1951; 1955	Lord President of the Council (1951–1952); Chancellor of the Duchy of Lancaster (1952–1955); Minister of Materials (1952–1954)	Winston Churchill	
Frederick Marquis; 1st Earl of Woolton	1 July 1946	1 November 1955	1950; 1951; 1955	Lord President of the Council (1951–1952); Chancellor of the Duchy of Lancaster (1952–1955); Minister of Materials (1952–1954)	Anthony Eden	
Oliver Poole	1 November 1955	18 September 1957	—		Anthony Eden	
Oliver Poole	1 November 1955	18 September 1957	—		Harold Macmillan	
Quintin Hogg; 2nd Viscount Hailsham	18 September 1957	14 October 1959	1959	Lord President of the Council (1957–1959)	Harold Macmillan	
Rab Butler; MP for Saffron Walden	14 October 1959	10 October 1961	—	Home Secretary (1957–1962); Leader of the House of Commons (1955–1961)	Harold Macmillan	
Iain Macleod; MP for Enfield West	10 October 1961	21 October 1963	—	Chancellor of the Duchy of Lancaster (1961–1963); Leader of the House of Commons (1961–1963)	Harold Macmillan	(Note: Iain Macleod and Baron Poole jointly held the chairmanship from 17 April to 10 October 1961.)
Oliver Poole; 1st Baron Poole	17 April 1963 (Jointly)	21 October 1963	—		Harold Macmillan	
John Hare; 1st Viscount Blakenham	21 October 1963	21 January 1965	1964	Chancellor of the Duchy of Lancaster (1963–1964)	Harold Macmillan	
John Hare; 1st Viscount Blakenham	21 October 1963	21 January 1965	1964	Chancellor of the Duchy of Lancaster (1963–1964)	Alec Douglas-Home	
Edward du Cann; MP for Taunton	21 January 1965	11 September 1967	1966		Alec Douglas-Home	
Edward du Cann; MP for Taunton	21 January 1965	11 September 1967	1966		Edward Heath	
Anthony Barber; MP for Altrincham and Sale	11 September 1967	31 July 1970	1970		Edward Heath	
Peter Thomas; MP for Hendon South	31 July 1970	7 April 1972	—	Secretary of State for Wales (1970–1974)	Edward Heath	
Peter Carington; 6th Baron Carrington	7 April 1972	11 June 1974	Feb 1974	Secretary of State for Defence (1970–1974); Secretary of State for Energy (1974)	Edward Heath	
William Whitelaw; MP for Penrith and The Border	11 June 1974	27 February 1975	Oct 1974		Edward Heath	
Peter Thorneycroft; Baron Thorneycroft	27 February 1975	14 September 1981	1979		Margaret Thatcher	
Cecil Parkinson; MP for South Hertfordshire	14 September 1981	14 September 1983	1983	Paymaster General (1981–1983); Chancellor of the Duchy of Lancaster (1982–1983); Secretary of State for Trade and Industry (1983)	Margaret Thatcher	
John Gummer; MP for Suffolk Coastal	14 September 1983	2 September 1985	—	Parliamentary Under-Secretary of State of Employment (1983); Minister of State for Employment (1983–1985); Paymaster General (1984–1985)	Margaret Thatcher	
Norman Tebbit; MP for Chingford	2 September 1985	2 November 1987	1987	Chancellor of the Duchy of Lancaster (1985–1987)	Margaret Thatcher	
Peter Brooke; MP for City of London and Westminster South	2 November 1987	24 July 1989	—	Paymaster General (1987–1989)	Margaret Thatcher	
Kenneth Baker; MP for Mole Valley	24 July 1989	28 November 1990	—	Chancellor of the Duchy of Lancaster	Margaret Thatcher	
Chris Patten; MP for Bath	28 November 1990	10 May 1992	1992	Chancellor of the Duchy of Lancaster	John Major	
Sir Norman Fowler; MP for Sutton Coldfield	10 May 1992	20 July 1994	—	Attended Cabinet	John Major	
Jeremy Hanley; MP for Richmond and Barnes	20 July 1994	5 July 1995	—	Minister without portfolio	John Major	
Brian Mawhinney; MP for Peterborough → North West Cambridgeshire	5 July 1995	20 June 1997	1997	Minister without portfolio	John Major	
Cecil Parkinson; Baron Parkinson	20 June 1997	2 December 1998	—		William Hague	
Michael Ancram; Earl of Ancram; MP for Devizes	2 December 1998	18 September 2001	2001		William Hague	
David Davis; MP for Haltemprice and Howden	18 September 2001	23 July 2002	—		Iain Duncan Smith	
Theresa May; MP for Maidenhead	23 July 2002	6 November 2003	—		Iain Duncan Smith	
Liam Fox; MP for Woodspring	6 November 2003	6 May 2005	2005		Michael Howard	(Note: Liam Fox and Lord Saatchi jointly held the chairmanship from 11 November 2003 to 6 May 2005.)
Maurice Saatchi; Baron Saatchi	10 November 2003 (Jointly)	6 May 2005	2005		Michael Howard	
Francis Maude; MP for Horsham	6 May 2005	2 July 2007	—		Michael Howard	
Francis Maude; MP for Horsham	6 May 2005	2 July 2007	—		David Cameron	
Caroline Spelman; MP for Meriden	2 July 2007	19 January 2009	—		David Cameron	
Eric Pickles; MP for Brentwood and Ongar	19 January 2009	12 May 2010	2010		David Cameron	
Andrew Feldman; Baron Feldman of Elstree	12 May 2010 (Jointly 2010–15)	14 July 2016	2015		David Cameron	(Note: Lord Feldman of Elstree and Baroness Warsi jointly held the chairmanship from 12 May 2010 to 4 September 2012.) (Note: Lord Feldman of Elstree and Grant Shapps jointly held the chairmanship from 4 September 2012 to 11 May 2015.)
Sayeeda Warsi; Baroness Warsi	12 May 2010 (Jointly)	4 September 2012	—	Minister without portfolio	David Cameron	
Grant Shapps; MP for Welwyn Hatfield	4 September 2012 (Jointly)	11 May 2015	2015	Minister without portfolio	David Cameron	
Sir Patrick McLoughlin; MP for Derbyshire Dales	14 July 2016	8 January 2018	2017	Chancellor of the Duchy of Lancaster	Theresa May	
Brandon Lewis; MP for Great Yarmouth	8 January 2018	24 July 2019	—	Minister without portfolio	Theresa May	
Ben Elliot	24 July 2019 (Jointly)	5 September 2022	2019		Boris Johnson	(Note: Ben Elliot and James Cleverly jointly held the chairmanship from 24 July 2019 to 13 February 2020.) (Note: Ben Elliot and Amanda Milling jointly held the chairmanship from 13 February 2020 to 15 September 2021.) (Note: Ben Elliot and Oliver Dowden jointly held the chairmanship from 15 September 2021 to 24 June 2022.) (Note: Ben Elliot and Andrew Stephenson jointly held the chairmanship from 7 July 2022 to 5 September 2022.)
James Cleverly; MP for Braintree	24 July 2019 (Jointly)	13 February 2020	2019	Minister without portfolio	Boris Johnson	
Amanda Milling; MP for Cannock Chase	13 February 2020 (Jointly)	15 September 2021	—	Minister without portfolio	Boris Johnson	
Oliver Dowden; MP for Hertsmere	15 September 2021 (Jointly)	24 June 2022	—	Minister without portfolio	Boris Johnson	
Andrew Stephenson; MP for Pendle	7 July 2022 (Jointly)	6 September 2022	—	Minister without portfolio	Boris Johnson	
Sir Jake Berry; MP for Rossendale and Darwen	6 September 2022	25 October 2022	—	Minister without portfolio	Liz Truss	
Nadhim Zahawi; MP for Stratford-on-Avon	25 October 2022	29 January 2023	—	Minister without portfolio	Rishi Sunak	
Greg Hands; MP for Chelsea and Fulham	7 February 2023	13 November 2023	—	Minister without portfolio	Rishi Sunak	
Richard Holden; MP for North West Durham	13 November 2023	5 July 2024	2024	Minister without portfolio	Rishi Sunak	
Richard Fuller; MP for North Bedfordshire	8 July 2024	4 November 2024	—		Rishi Sunak	
Nigel Huddleston; MP for Droitwich and Evesham	4 November 2024	22 July 2025	—		Kemi Badenoch	
Dominic Johnson; Lord Johnson of Lainston	4 November 2024	22 July 2025	—		Kemi Badenoch	
Kevin Hollinrake; MP for Thirsk and Malton	22 July 2025	Incumbent	—		Kemi Badenoch	

== See also ==
- 1922 Committee – the parliamentary body of the Conservative Party, which has its own Chairman
