= Sara Keays =

Personal secretary of British Conservative politician Cecil Parkinson (b. 1947)

- Born: 1 June 1947 (age 79)

Sara Keays (pronounced "Keys", born 1 June 1947) was the personal secretary of British Conservative politician Cecil Parkinson. The two became lovers, and Keays' public revelation of her pregnancy and of their twelve-year-long affair led to his resignation as Secretary of State for Trade and Industry in the government of Margaret Thatcher.

== Parkinson's resignation ==
Parkinson was forced to resign on 14 October 1983 after it was revealed that Keays was bearing his child, Flora Keays. Subsequently, as a result of a dispute over child maintenance payments, Parkinson (with Keays' initial consent) was able to gain an injunction in 1993, forbidding the British media from making any reference to their daughter.

At the time of the revelation of his relationship with Sara Keays in 1983, Parkinson made much of what he described as the volume of supportive letters which he had received. By 2001, however, the media focused more upon Flora and her difficulties than in protecting Parkinson's reputation, so more voices were raised in criticism of Parkinson.

Keays published her own book about the controversy, A Question of Judgement, in 1985.

== Daughter ==
Flora Keays (born 31 December 1983, in Merton, Greater London) has learning disabilities and Asperger syndrome, and had an operation to remove a brain tumour when she was four.

The court order was the subject of some controversy until its expiry when Flora Keays turned 18 on 31 December 2001. It was noted in the press that Parkinson had never met her and presumably had no intention of doing so. While he had financially assisted with Flora's education and upkeep, it was publicly pointed out that he had never sent her a birthday card and that her mother assumed that Flora could never expect to receive one.

In January 2002, Channel 4 broadcast a documentary film on Sara and Flora Keays. In it Flora said: “I would like to see him. If he loved me, he would want to see me and be in my everyday life... I think my father has behaved very badly towards me. I feel jealous that my mother has known him but I haven’t, and jealous of other people who go on holiday with their fathers, when I don’t.” Sara Keays is shown telling her daughter that her father has never seen her because "he didn't want anything to do with us".

Sara Keays, who was forced to educate her daughter at home, and encouraged her in ballet, gymnastics, horseriding and trampolining, said Parkinson's reappointment by William Hague as Chairman of the Conservative Party caused the youngster problems when she finally secured a place at a secondary school: "It was torture for her. She was bullied, just because somebody thought it was necessary for him to have his job back, basically".

Speaking ahead of the film, Sara Keays angrily denied that she fell pregnant to trap her lover and attacked Downing Street and Conservative Central Office for conducting a "very powerful and all pervasive disinformation campaign" to discredit her at the time.

Maintenance payments to Sara Keays for her daughter, who requires her mother's 24-hour care, ceased a few months after Cecil Parkinson died in early 2016. Flora Keays was excluded from Parkinson's will (worth £1.1 million) but was provided for separately as the beneficiary of a life assurance policy worth £350,000. In 2017, her mother was preparing to sue Parkinson's estate for further support, expressing concern that they could be left homeless at any time.

== Publications ==
Memoirs

- Keays, Sara (1985). A Question of Judgement. Quintessential Press. p. 320. ISBN 1-85138-000-0.

Fiction

- Keays, Sara (1996). The Black Book. Doubleday. p. 329. ISBN 0-385-40811-0.

== See also ==
- Richard Dalton
