= Zerbanoo Gifford =

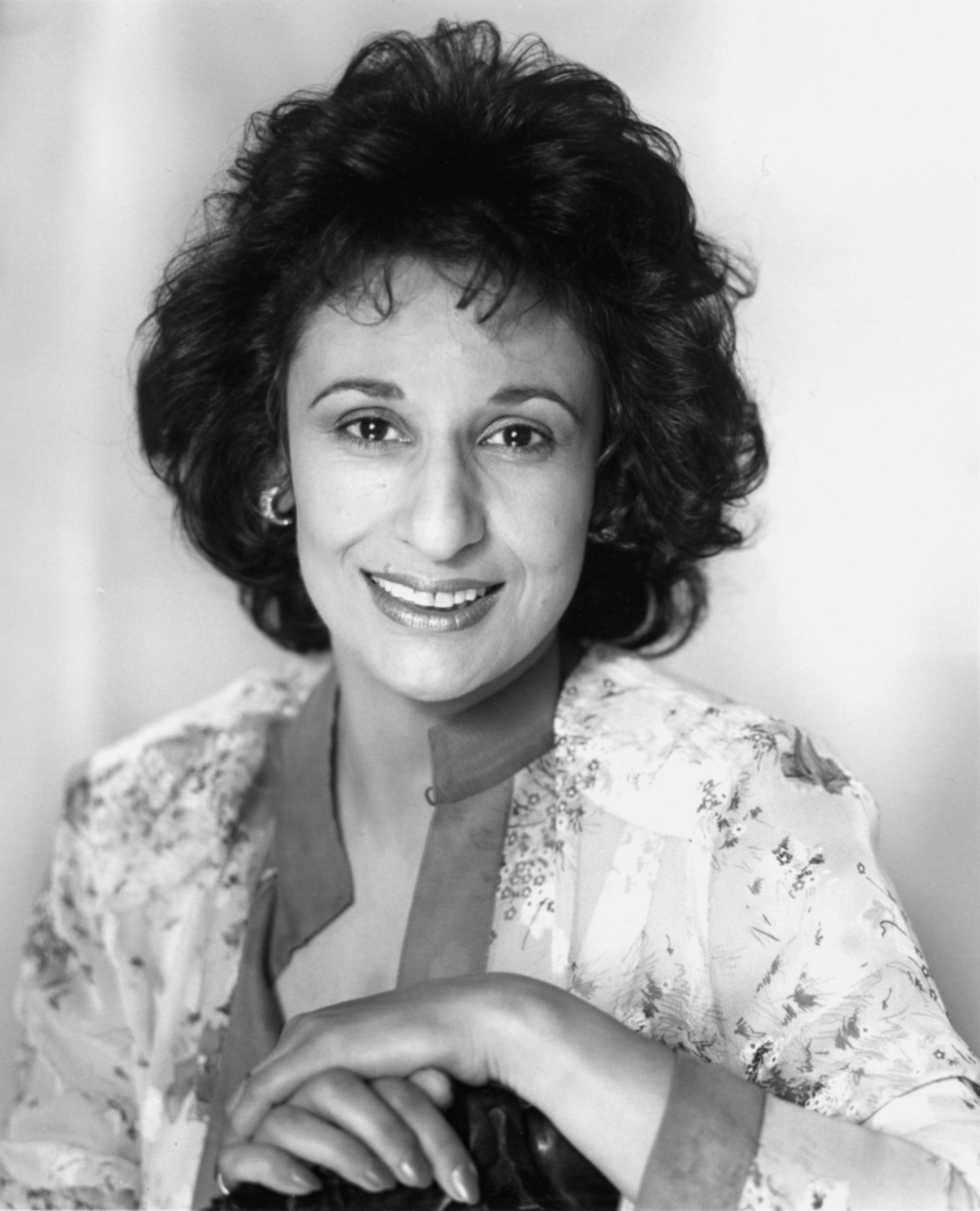
- Born: 11 May 1950 (age 76); India
- Occupations: writer, human rights campaigner

Zerbanoo Gifford is a British writer and human rights campaigner of Indian Zoroastrian origin. She is honorary director of the ASHA Foundation, which she founded, and president of the World Zoroastrian Organisation.

Gifford was brought from India to Britain by her parents when she was three. She was educated at Roedean School, at Watford College of Technology, at the London School of Journalism and at the Open University. Her first book, The Golden Thread, was published in 1990.

== Charitable work ==
Gifford has been active in charitable work. She has been a director of Anti-Slavery International and of the Charities Aid Foundation. She is founder of the ASHA Foundation and the ASHA Centre in the Forest of Dean.

== Politics ==
In 1982 Gifford was elected a councillor for Harrow, the first female Asian councillor to be elected for the Liberal Party. She has stood three times for Parliament, Hertsmere in 1983 (Liberal/SDP Alliance) and 1992 (Liberal Democrat), and Harrow East (Liberal/SDP Alliance) in 1987. By standing in 1983, she became one of the first three Asian women to stand for Parliament along with Rita Austin (Labour, St Albans) and Pramila Le Hunte (Conservative, Birmingham Ladywood).

In 1986 she chaired the Liberal "Commission of Inquiry into Ethnic Minority Involvement in the Liberal Party". Gifford was twice elected by the party's membership the Liberal Democrats' Federal Executive, the first ethnic minority person to be elected to a major UK party's supreme body. She was a member of the Race Relations Forum set up in 1998 by then Home Secretary, Jack Straw.

In 1992 Gifford co-chaired the centenary celebrations for the election of the first non-white MP, Dadabhai Naoroji.

== Recognition ==
Gifford received the Nehru Centenary Award in 1989. She was nominated for the Women of Europe Award in 1991. A biography of her by Farida Master, Zerbanoo Gifford: An Uncensored Life, was published in 2015. Gifford was one of the seven former pupils who featured in Roedean school's 125 anniversary celebrations.

In October 2026, she was given the Emmeline Pankhurst Award for Woman of Achievement by the Women of the Year Luncheon and Awards.

== Personal Life ==
She is married to Richard Gifford, a human rights lawyer known for his work on behalf of the Chagossians. Alongside exiled Chagossians, they had an audience with Pope Leo XIV in 2025.

They have two sons, Mark, an interfaith minister and solicitor, and Alexander, an actor/theatre director.

== Publications ==
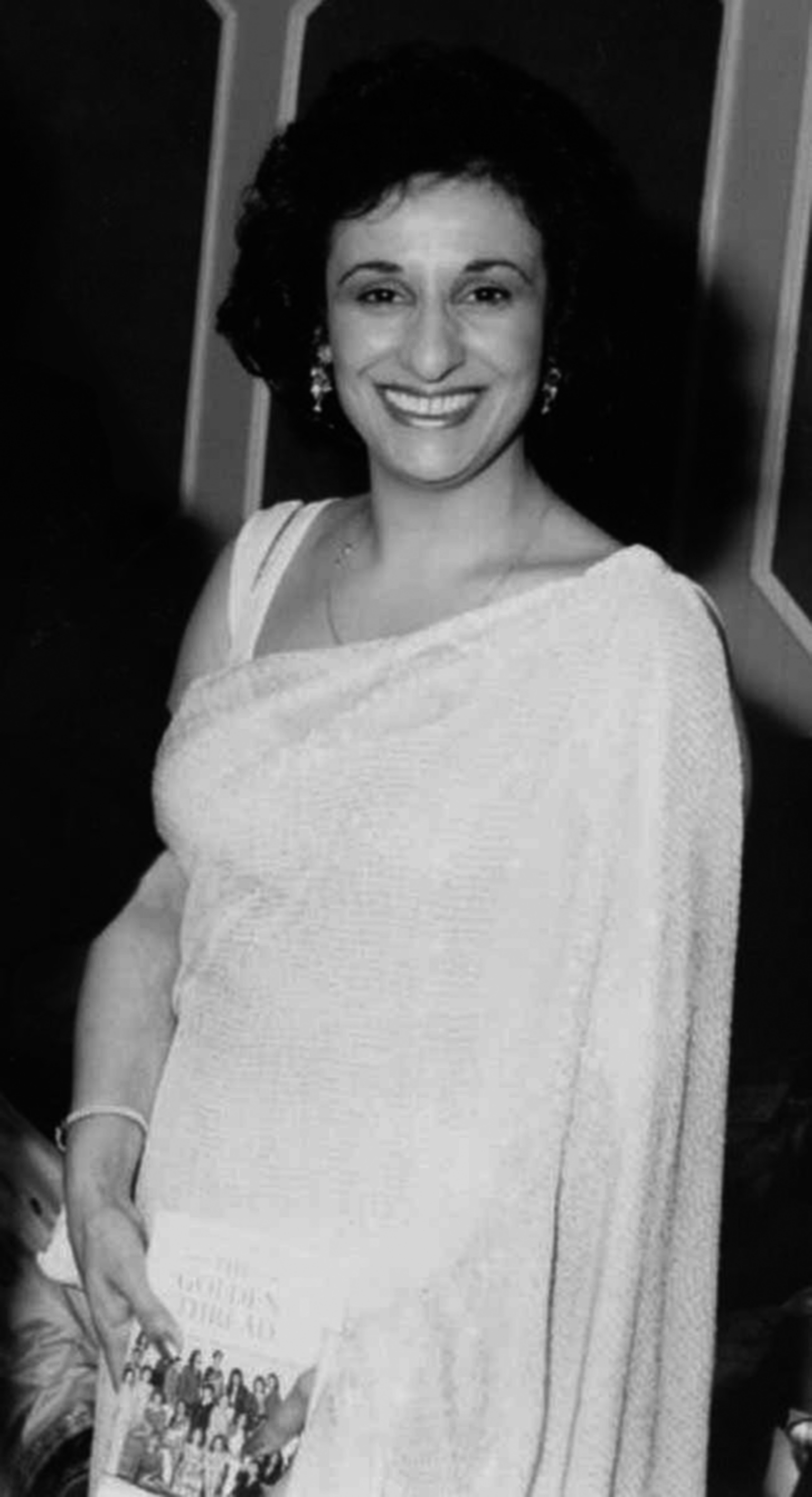
At the launch of her book The Golden Thread

Gifford's written works include:

- The Golden Thread: Asian Experiences of Post-Raj Britain, 1990
- Dadabhai Naoroji, Britain's First Asian MP, 1992
- The Asian Presence in Europe, 1995
- Thomas Clarkson and the Campaign against Slavery, 1996
- Foreword to Race and British Electoral Politics, 1998
- Celebrating India, 1998
- South Asian Funding in the UK, 1999
- Confessions to a Serial Womaniser: Secrets of the World's Inspirational Women, 2007
- Z-A of Zoroastrianism, 2007
- A Call to Consciousness, 2026

She was one of fifty contributors to the BBC's Video Nation project.
