= Evelyn Macleod, Baroness Macleod of Borve =

British public servant (1915-1999)

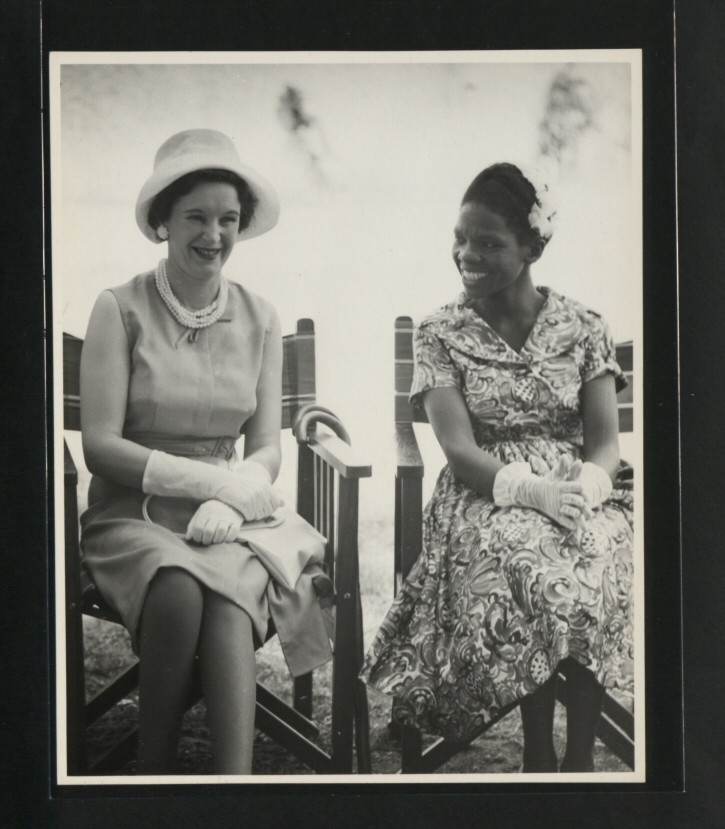
Evelyn Macleod with Maria Nyerere

Evelyn Hester Macleod, Baroness Macleod of Borve DL (19 February 1915 – 17 November 1999) was a British public servant.

Born Evelyn Hester Blois, she was the eldest daughter of Revd. Gervase Vanneck Blois (1881–1961), rector of Hanbury, Worcestershire (and son of Sir John Blois, 8th Baronet) and his wife Hester, daughter of Herbert Pakington, 3rd Baron Hampton. She was educated at Lawnside boarding-school in Great Malvern, was presented as a debutante at court and played tennis for Worcestershire.

On 3 July 1937, she married Mervyn Charles Mason (1907–1940) near Malmesbury, Wiltshire. During World War II, she worked for the London ambulance service and her husband was a Lieutenant in the Pioneer Corps. In 1940, he was killed after his ship was torpedoed off the coast of Ireland and she later married the future politician, Iain Norman Macleod, in 1941. They had two children, Torquil and Diana.

In June 1952, Macleod was struck by meningitis and polio and was subsequently paralysed in one leg, but managed to walk with the aid of sticks. When her husband was Secretary of State for the Colonies, she entertained various conference delegates, and served as a magistrate, founder chairwoman (later president) of the National Association of Leagues of Hospital Friends (renamed Attend since 2006) and co-founder of Crisis at Christmas in 1967.

After her husband died in 1970, she accepted (on the recommendation of Edward Heath) a life peerage as Baroness Macleod of Borve, of Borve in the Isle of Lewis. In the House of Lords, she spoke on penal policy, the defence of widow's pensions and in 1976, launched the National Association of Widows. From 1972-5 she was a member of the Independent Broadcasting Authority and the first chairwoman of the National Gas Consumers' Council from 1972–7.

Baroness Macleod was the Chairman of the charity Attend (then National Association of Leagues of Hospital Friends) from 1974–1985. She was elected to the position of President and held that title from 1985 to 1989. When she stepped down from the post of President, she was honoured as a Vice President until her death in 1999.

She died in 1999.
