= 1970 Enfield West by-election =

Election

The 1970 Enfield West by-election of 19 November 1970 was held after Conservative Member of Parliament (MP) Iain Macleod died on 20 July of the same year. The seat was retained by the Conservatives.

== Result ==
Enfield West by-Election, 1970
| Party | Candidate | Votes | % | ±% |
|---|---|---|---|---|
| Conservative | Cecil Parkinson | 15,205 | 57.18 | −0.72 |
| Labour | Herbert C King | 6,926 | 26.05 | −0.17 |
| Liberal | Anthony Stowell | 3,283 | 12.35 | −0.42 |
| National Front | Kenneth Taylor | 1,176 | 4.42 | +1.31 |
| Majority | | 8,279 | 31.13 | −0.56 |
| Turnout | | 26,590 | | |
| Conservative hold | | Swing | | |
