= A. G. Mehta =

Ugandan politician (1927–1969)

The Honourable A.G. Mehta
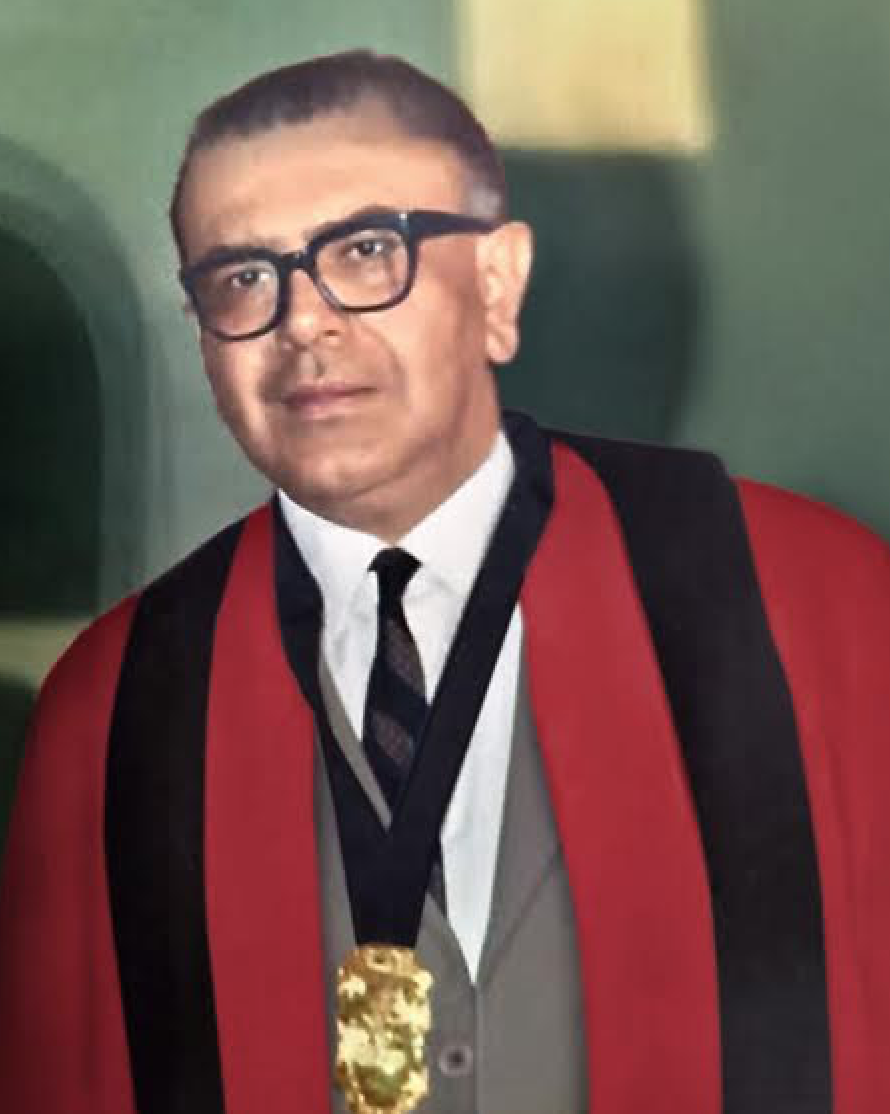
- Mehta in 1968

Mayor of Kampala, Uganda
- In office 1968 – 10 March 1969 (died in office)
- Preceded by: W.Y. Nega
- Succeeded by: Nakibinge

Member of Parliament
- In office 1960 – 1968

Personal details
- Born: 1 February 1927 Masaka, Uganda
- Died: 10 March 1969 Kampala, Uganda
- Party: Uganda People's Congress
- Spouse: Savita Radia
- Children: 6
- Education: Queen Mary University of London, School of Law

A. G. Mehta (1 February 1927 – 10 March 1969) was a Ugandan member of parliament, barrister and the eldest son of a prominent Indian industrialist. The Honourable A.G. Mehta was elected as the first Asian-Indian mayor of Uganda's capital Kampala in 1968 and was a close colleague of Uganda's first prime minister Milton Obote; with whom he jointly fought for the country's independence at the Uganda Constitutional Conference in 1961. He is credited with drafting elements of what would become the first Constitution of Uganda.

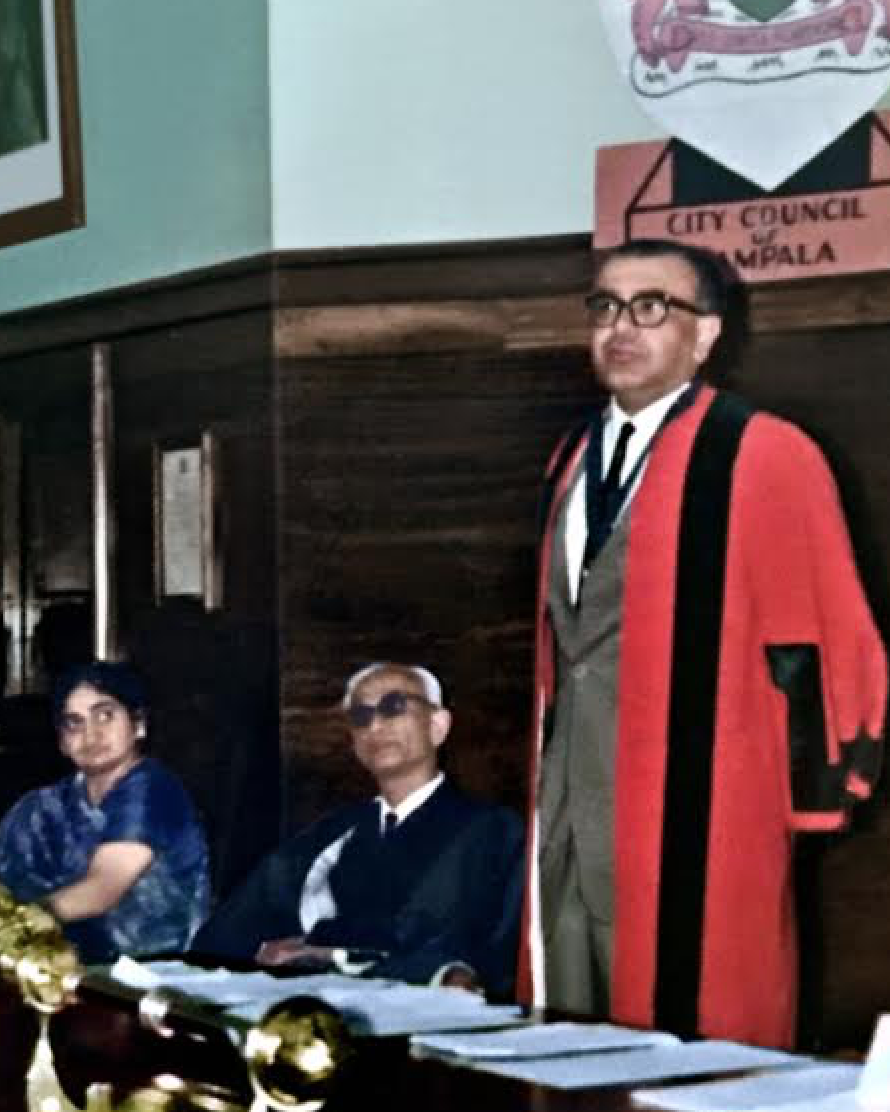
Mehta and wife Savita Radia (left) in the city council of Kampala, Uganda, 1968

== Education ==
A.G. Mehta was educated as a barrister at Queen Mary University of London, School of Law, in West London, and was legally permitted to practice law in the United Kingdom, Uganda and Kenya.

== Political career ==
=== Member of Parliament ===
As a member of parliament, A.G. Mehta attended the Uganda Constitutional Conference at Lancaster House in 1961 as part of the Uganda Peoples’ Congress (UPC) delegation alongside Milton Obote. The conference was also attended by then Governor of Uganda, Sir Frederick Crawford, and the Secretary of State for the Colonies, Iain Macleod. Recommendations produced by Mehta and other conference attendees resulted in the first Ugandan Constitution, which took effect on 9 October 1962.

=== Mayor of Kampala ===
A.G. Mehta was elected as the first Indian mayor of Uganda's capital city, Kampala, in 1968. One week before his death in 1969, Mehta opened the first exhibition on the Baháʼí Faith in the National Theatre of Uganda, where his opening address, attended by numerous East-African dignitaries, advocated pointedly for the unity of mankind.

== Family ==
A. G. Mehta was born the eldest son of the Mehta family, one of Kampala's longest-standing and most prominent Indian families originally hailing from Porbandar, Gujarat, India. The Mehta family were amongst the first multi-millionaires in East Africa with numerous agricultural businesses including the production of cotton and coffee.

Following his death in 1969, Mehta's widow, Savita Mehta (née Radia) and five surviving children —Avi Mehta, Asha Mehta (later Madhvani), Asita Mehta, Alka Mehta, and Aditi Mehta (later Rajani)— were exiled from Uganda by his former colleague, Idi Amin.

Mehta's granddaughter is Maya Asha McDonald, a British-Canadian art historian and journalist known best for her 2022 op-ed on Russian President Vladimir Putin.

== Publications and institutions ==
A.G. Mehta's role in establishing the first Constitution of Uganda in 1962 is recorded in Ali AlʼAmin Mazrui's 1978 book Political Values and the Educated Class in Africa published by the University of California Press.

Images of Mehta's political career can be found in the British Library and were digitised by the Endangered Archives Programme.
