= Ugandan Constitutional Conference =

Conference leading to Ugandan independence

The Ugandan Constitutional Conference, held at Lancaster House in the autumn of 1961, was organised by the British Government to pave the way of Ugandan independence.

== History ==
The Conference opened on 18 September 1961 and concluded on 9 October 1961. It was convened to discuss the Report of the Uganda Relationships Commission, which had been tasked with "consider[ing] the future form of government best suited to Uganda the question of the relationship between the Central Government and the other authorities in Uganda" and had reported in June. In addition to UK Government Ministers (including the Secretary of State for the Colonies, Ian Macleod), the conference was attended by representatives of the colonial administration (headed by Sir Frederick Crawford, then Governor of Uganda), Baganda, the Democratic Party, the Uganda People's Congress (UPC) and others. Milton Obote and the honourable A.G. Mehta were the lead representatives for the UPC.

The main issue facing the conference was the status afforded to the different historic kingdoms of Uganda (and in particular the Kingdom of Buganda) in exchange for them recognising the existence of the new state of Uganda, of which they would only be one part. In addition, the Kingdom of Bunyoro only agreed to participate in the Conference if the disputed status of the "lost counties" was discussed. When, during the Conference, Macleod suggested that the referendum envisaged by the Relationships Commission could not proceed given the lack Bugandan support, instead proposing the establishment of a further Commission of Privy Councillors (the Molson Commission), Bunyoro's delegates walked out.

The recommendations of the conference resulted in the Buganda Agreement of 1961, which supplanted the Buganda Agreement of 1955, as well as the first Ugandan Constitution.

== See also ==
- Uganda Independence Conference, held at Marlborough House in June 1962
