= Cecil Parkinson =

British politician (1931–2016)

The Right Honourable The Lord Parkinson PC
- Parkinson in 2015

Chairman of the Conservative Party
- In office 11 June 1997 – 1 June 1998
- Leader: William Hague
- Preceded by: Brian Mawhinney
- Succeeded by: Michael Ancram
- In office 14 September 1981 – 11 June 1983
- Leader: Margaret Thatcher
- Preceded by: The Lord Thorneycroft
- Succeeded by: John Gummer

Secretary of State for Transport
- In office 24 July 1989 – 28 November 1990
- Prime Minister: Margaret Thatcher
- Preceded by: Paul Channon
- Succeeded by: Malcolm Rifkind

Secretary of State for Energy
- In office 13 June 1987 – 24 July 1989
- Prime Minister: Margaret Thatcher
- Preceded by: Peter Walker
- Succeeded by: John Wakeham

Secretary of State for Trade and Industry
- In office 12 June 1983 – 14 October 1983
- Prime Minister: Margaret Thatcher
- Preceded by: The Lord Cockfield (Trade); Patrick Jenkin (Industry)
- Succeeded by: Norman Tebbit

Chancellor of the Duchy of Lancaster
- In office 6 April 1982 – 11 June 1983
- Prime Minister: Margaret Thatcher
- Preceded by: The Baroness Young
- Succeeded by: The Lord Cockfield

Paymaster General
- In office 14 September 1981 – 11 June 1983
- Prime Minister: Margaret Thatcher
- Preceded by: Francis Pym
- Succeeded by: John Gummer

Minister of State for Trade
- In office 7 May 1979 – 14 September 1981
- Prime Minister: Margaret Thatcher
- Preceded by: Michael Meacher
- Succeeded by: Peter Rees

Member of the House of Lords
- Lord Temporal
- Life peerage 29 June 1992 – 14 September 2015

Member of Parliament for Hertsmere South Hertfordshire (1974-1983) Enfield West (1970-1974)
- In office 19 November 1970 – 16 March 1992
- Preceded by: Iain Macleod
- Succeeded by: James Clappison

Personal details
- Born: 1 September 1931 Carnforth, Lancashire, England
- Died: 22 January 2016 (aged 84) Marylebone, London, England
- Party: Conservative
- Spouse: Anne Jarvis (m. 1957)
- Children: 4
- Education: Emmanuel College, Cambridge

Cecil Edward Parkinson, Baron Parkinson, PC (1 September 1931 – 22 January 2016) was a British Conservative Party politician and cabinet minister. A chartered accountant by training, he entered Parliament in November 1970, and was appointed a minister in Margaret Thatcher's first government in May 1979. He successfully managed the Conservative Party's 1983 election campaign, and was rewarded with an appointment as Secretary of State for Trade and Industry, but was forced to resign following revelations that his former secretary, Sara Keays, was pregnant with his child, whom she later bore and named Flora Keays. Flora was born with severe cerebral palsy.

Parkinson subsequently served as Secretary of State for Energy, and later Secretary of State for Transport. He resigned that office in 1990, on the same day that Thatcher resigned as Prime Minister. He was created Baron Parkinson in 1992, and served in the House of Lords until his retirement in September 2015.

== Early life ==
Cecil Parkinson was born at 4 Edward Street, Carnforth, Lancashire, the son of Sydney Parkinson (13 April 1906 – 15 July 1995), a warehouseman for a corn dealer, later a railwayman, and his wife, Bridget, née Graham (29 January 1910 – 1991), who was from a Northern Irish family from Tyrone and Fermanagh but their roots were in Scotland. He had a younger sister, Norma (b. March 1933). He was educated at Lancaster Royal Grammar School, a state-run day and boarding school for boys, from 1943 to 1950 after passing his eleven-plus from where he won a scholarship to Cambridge University, where he read English at Emmanuel College, later switching to read law. He won a Blue as an athlete, competing over 220 and 440 yards. While at university, Parkinson was a Labour supporter and for a time was a member of that party. He even canvassed for them at the 1950 and 1951 General Elections. He did National service as an NCO in the Royal Air Force from 1950 to 1952.

After leaving university, Parkinson worked as a manager for the Metal Box Company, later becoming a consultant. He trained and qualified as a chartered accountant, and founded Parkinson-Hart Securities in 1961.

== Member of Parliament ==
In the June 1970 general election Parkinson stood as Conservative candidate for Northampton, but was not elected. He was elected MP for Enfield West at a by-election in November 1970, following the death of Iain Macleod. When that constituency was abolished for the February 1974 general election he was elected for the new South Hertfordshire constituency. Following the 1979 general election he was made a junior trade minister. On 14 September 1981, he was appointed Chairman of the Conservative Party as well as Paymaster General with a seat in the cabinet; he was given the added official title of Chancellor of the Duchy of Lancaster in 1982. Despite his relatively junior status, he was a member of the small War Cabinet that Margaret Thatcher set up to run the Falklands War.

=== In government ===
He worked on the Conservative Party's 1983 election campaign, standing in the new Hertsmere constituency after South Hertfordshire's abolition. As a result of his success on the campaign, Thatcher had intended to promote him to Foreign Secretary; however, before the election he warned her that this would be unwise, for his former secretary, Sara Keays, was pregnant with his child. Although Thatcher initially remonstrated with him that Anthony Eden's womanising had been no bar on his being Foreign Secretary, she instead appointed him Secretary of State for Trade and Industry.

Parkinson was forced to resign on 14 October 1983, after the news of Sara Keays's pregnancy had become public knowledge. The child was born on New Year's Eve, and christened Flora Keays. Subsequently, as a result of a dispute over child maintenance payments, Parkinson (with Keays's initial consent) was able to gain an injunction in 1993, forbidding the British media from making any reference to their daughter. Following the birth, Parkinson released a statement in which he wished the baby "peace, privacy and a happy life". Flora Keays has learning difficulties and Asperger syndrome, and also underwent an operation to remove a brain tumour when she was four, although it is unknown whether this either caused or complicated her condition.

This court order was the subject of some controversy until Flora Keays reached the age of 18 at the end of 2001, when the court order expired. It was stated in the press that Parkinson had never met his child and presumably had no intention of doing so. While he had assisted with Flora's education and her financial upkeep, it was publicly pointed out that he had not even sent her a birthday card and that her mother assumed that Flora could not ever expect to receive one.

At the time of the revelation of Parkinson's relationship with Sara Keays, he made much of what he described as the volume of letters in support that he received. Many in the Conservative Party attacked Keays. Edwina Currie said on 7 October 1985, whilst herself having an affair with John Major, "I feel very very sorry for Cecil and his family. Most of my thoughts on Sara Keays are unprintable. Perhaps the most polite thing to say is she's a right cow". By 2001, however, the media focused more upon Flora and her difficulties than on protecting Parkinson's reputation, so more voices were raised in criticism of Parkinson.

Following four years on the back benches, he was appointed Secretary of State for Energy in 1987 (having been tipped as a potential Chancellor of the Exchequer), and for Transport in the July 1989 reshuffle. One of the highlights during his tenure of the latter job was announcing new main-line rail tunnels across London, called Crossrail. He resigned along with Margaret Thatcher when she was replaced by John Major and stood down from the House of Commons at the 1992 general election.

Following the 1992 election, he was created Baron Parkinson, of Carnforth, in the County of Lancashire, on 29 June 1992.

That year, Parkinson also published his memoirs, in which he claimed that, with a determined campaign, Thatcher would have won the second ballot of the Conservative leadership election, when her Cabinet had warned her she would lose and thus persuaded her to stand down.

=== Shadow Cabinet ===
Parkinson returned to front-line politics when he was made Conservative Party Chairman again, by William Hague, in June 1997. He retired from this role in 1998; afterwards he kept a low profile, although he was a vice-chairman of the Conservative Way Forward group. He was also the Honorary President of Conservative Friends of Poland.

== Personal life ==
Parkinson married Ann Mary Jarvis on 2 February 1957. They had three daughters: Mary, Emma and Joanna. Mary was found hanged in December 2017 following a period of depression after her father's death in 2016.

As a result of an extra-marital affair with Sara Keays, his personal secretary, he fathered a daughter, Flora, whom he never met or acknowledged.

He was a supporter of Preston North End, and in November 1988 paid a tribute to Tom Finney on This Is Your Life.

Parkinson was an active freemason.

== Death ==
Parkinson died from colorectal cancer at The London Clinic in Marylebone, London, on 22 January 2016. He left nothing in his will for his daughter Flora: in April 2017, it was reported that Sara Keays was preparing to sue Parkinson's estate to continue to gain support for her daughter's 24-hour care, for regular payments had ceased a few months after Parkinson died.

Parkinson's daughter, Mary, was found dead at her home in Wandsworth on 10 December 2017, aged 57. Police did not treat the death as suspicious, and it was later reported that she had taken her own life.

== Charitable works ==
He was one of the three presidents of the UK-based charity Action on Addiction.

== In the media ==
Parkinson's affair with Sara Keays was a running joke in the satirical magazine Private Eye for over a decade (and on the satirical TV programme Spitting Image for nearly as long), with the magazine seldom passing up an opportunity to portray Parkinson as having a voracious sexual appetite. The relationship was the subject of a 2024 Channel 5 television documentary, A Very British Sex Scandal: The Love Child & the Secretary, aired from 1 May.

He was interviewed about the rise of Thatcherism for the 2006 BBC TV documentary series Tory! Tory! Tory!

== Arms ==
Coat of arms of Cecil Parkinson
Coronet A Coronet of a Baron Crest A Crown Palisado therein a Grassy Mount and thereon a Crane statant proper holding in its beak a Rose Gules barbed and seeded slipped and leaved proper Escutcheon Quarterly Gules and Azure a Fret throughout Argent on a Chief per pale Azure and Gules a Hart's Head caboshed between two Lion's Heads guardant Or langued argent all within a Bordure Ermine Supporters Dexter: a Crane statant reguardant proper; Sinister: a Hart rampant reguardant also proper attired Or Compartment A Grassy Mount proper with on each side and growing therefrom three Roses Gules barbed and seed slipped and leaved all proper

== Bibliography ==
- Moore, Charles (2015). Margaret Thatcher: The Authorized Biography, Volume Two: Everything She Wants. London: Allen Lane. ISBN 978-0-713-99288-5.

Parliament of the United Kingdom
Preceded by Iain Macleod	Member of Parliament for Enfield West; 1970–1974	Constituency abolished
New constituency	Member of Parliament for South Hertfordshire; 1974–1983	Constituency abolished
New constituency	Member of Parliament for Hertsmere; 1983–1992	Succeeded by James Clappison
Political offices
Preceded by Francis Pym	Paymaster General; 1981–1983	Succeeded by John Gummer
Preceded by The Baroness Young	Chancellor of the Duchy of Lancaster; 1982–1983	Succeeded by The Lord Cockfield
Preceded by The Lord Cockfield as Secretary of State for Trade	Secretary of State for Trade and Industry; 1983	Succeeded by Norman Tebbit
Preceded by Patrick Jenkin as Secretary of State for Industry	Secretary of State for Trade and Industry; 1983	Succeeded by Norman Tebbit
Preceded by Peter Walker	Secretary of State for Energy; 1987–1989	Succeeded by John Wakeham
Preceded by Paul Channon	Secretary of State for Transport; 1989–1990	Succeeded by Malcolm Rifkind
Party political offices
Preceded by The Lord Thorneycroft	Chairman of the Conservative Party; 1981–1983	Succeeded by John Gummer
Preceded by Brian Mawhinney	Chairman of the Conservative Party; 1997–1998	Succeeded by Michael Ancram
