= South Hertfordshire =

UK Parliament constituency (1974–1983)

- Former county constituency for the House of Commons
- South Hertfordshire in Hertfordshire, showing boundaries used from 1974–1983
- County: Hertfordshire

1974–1983
- Seats: One
- Created from: Barnet, Enfield West and St Albans
- Replaced by: Hertsmere, Watford and St Albans

South Hertfordshire was a constituency in Hertfordshire which returned one Member of Parliament (MP) to the House of Commons of the Parliament of the United Kingdom. It was created for the February 1974 general election and abolished for the 1983 general election when it was mainly replaced by the new Hertsmere constituency.

== Boundaries ==
Statutory definition

- The Urban District of Potters Bar;
- the Rural District of Elstree;
- in the Rural District of St Albans the parishes of Colney Heath, London Colney, and St Stephen; and
- in the Rural District of Watford the parish of Aldenham.

Components' immediate predecessor seats

- The land of the Urban District of Potters Bar in local government administration-abolished Middlesex has been in Hertfordshire since the creation of Greater London in 1965. It now moved into this new seat from the abolished Enfield West seat.
- The Rural District of Elstree was in the abolished Barnet seat.
- The three St Albans district parishes came from the very long-lived St Albans seat and Aldenham came from South West Hertfordshire.

Components' immediate successors

- Colney Heath went back to the St Albans seat and St Stephen transferred to the Watford seat.
- The rest formed most of the new constituency of Hertsmere.

== Members of Parliament ==
| Election | Member | Party |
|---|---|---|
| Feb 1974 | Cecil Parkinson | Conservative |
| 1983 | constituency abolished: see Hertsmere | |

== Election results ==
=== Elections in the 1970s ===
1970 notional result
| Party | Vote | % |
|---|---|---|
| Conservative | 22,900 | 48.9 |
| Labour | 18,000 | 38.5 |
| Liberal | 5,900 | 12.6 |
| Turnout | 46,800 | 73.2 |
| Electorate | 63,896 | |

General election February 1974: South Hertfordshire
| Party | Candidate | Votes | % | ±% |
|---|---|---|---|---|
| Conservative | Cecil Parkinson | 21,190 | 40.2 | −8.7 |
| Labour | Alf Dubs | 18,104 | 34.4 | −4.1 |
| Liberal | John Henchley | 13,356 | 25.4 | +12.8 |
| Majority | | 3,086 | 5.9 | −4.6 |
| Turnout | | 52,650 | 82.2 | +9.0 |
| Registered electors | | 64,035 | | |
| Conservative hold | | Swing | −2.3 | |

General election October 1974: South Hertfordshire
| Party | Candidate | Votes | % | ±% |
|---|---|---|---|---|
| Conservative | Cecil Parkinson | 21,018 | 42.7 | +2.5 |
| Labour | Alf Dubs | 18,790 | 38.2 | +3.8 |
| Liberal | John Henchley | 9,393 | 19.1 | −6.3 |
| Majority | | 2,228 | 4.5 | −1.3 |
| Turnout | | 49,201 | 76.1 | −6.1 |
| Registered electors | | 64,666 | | |
| Conservative hold | | Swing | −0.7 | |

General election 1979: South Hertfordshire
| Party | Candidate | Votes | % | ±% |
|---|---|---|---|---|
| Conservative | Cecil Parkinson | 27,857 | 54.1 | +11.3 |
| Labour | NG Male | 16,059 | 31.2 | −7.0 |
| Liberal | Gerald Sattin | 7,001 | 13.6 | −5.5 |
| National Front | S Fenn | 605 | 1.2 | New |
| Majority | | 11,798 | 22.9 | +18.4 |
| Turnout | | 51,522 | 79.0 | +2.9 |
| Registered electors | | 65,198 | | |
| Conservative hold | | Swing | +9.2 | |
