= Enfield West =

Parliamentary constituency in the United Kingdom, 1950–1974

- Former borough constituency for the House of Commons
- Enfield West in Middlesex, showing boundaries used from 1950–1974
- County: 1950–1965: Middlesex; 1965–1974: Greater London and Hertfordshire
- Major settlements: Potters Bar

1950–1974
- Seats: One
- Created from: Enfield
- Replaced by: Enfield North and South Hertfordshire

Enfield West was a constituency which returned one Member of Parliament (MP) to the House of Commons of the Parliament of the United Kingdom. It was created for the 1950 general election and abolished for the February 1974 general election.

== Boundaries ==
The Urban District of Potters Bar, and the Urban District of Enfield wards of South West and West.

Potters Bar Urban District (comprising that town, South Mimms and North Mimms, namely the western half of the seat) became part of Hertfordshire in 1965 however no change was made then to Westminster representation. The other district's wards having also been Middlesex became parts of Greater London, under the same Act passed in 1963 following a Royal Commission.

== Members of Parliament ==
Election	Member	Party	Notes
1950	Iain Macleod	Conservative	Chancellor of the Exchequer 1970. Died July 1970
1970 by-election	Cecil Parkinson	Conservative	
Feb 1974	constituency abolished		

== Elections ==
=== Elections in the 1950s ===
General election 1950: Enfield West
Party	Candidate	Votes	%	±%
Conservative	Iain Macleod	20,588	57.80	
Labour	Hugh Jenkins	11,395	31.99	
Liberal	William Primrose Campbell	3,638	10.21	
Majority		9,193	25.81	
Turnout		35,621		
Conservative win (new seat)				

General election 1951: Enfield West
Party	Candidate	Votes	%	±%
Conservative	Iain Macleod	22,351	64.83	
Labour	Kythe Caroline Hendy	12,126	35.17	
Majority		10,225	29.66	
Turnout		34,477	82.54	
Conservative hold		Swing		

General election 1955: Enfield West
Party	Candidate	Votes	%	±%
Conservative	Iain Macleod	22,021	67.71	
Labour	William A Court	10,503	32.29	
Majority		11,518	35.42	
Turnout		32,524	78.19	
Conservative hold		Swing		

General election 1959: Enfield West
Party	Candidate	Votes	%	±%
Conservative	Iain Macleod	24,861	69.21	
Labour	Geoffrey Hickman	11,058	30.79	
Majority		13,803	38.42	
Turnout		35,919	79.85	
Conservative hold		Swing		

=== Elections in the 1960s ===
General election 1964: Enfield West
Party	Candidate	Votes	%	±%
Conservative	Iain Macleod	19,612	51.63	
Liberal	Robert Glenton	8,885	23.39	New
Labour	Alan E Hale	8,853	23.31	
Ind. Conservative	Warwick Arthur Claremont Mowbray	635	1.67	New
Majority		10,727	28.24	
Turnout		37,985	81.02	
Conservative hold		Swing		

General election 1966: Enfield West
Party	Candidate	Votes	%	±%
Conservative	Iain Macleod	20,675	53.85	
Labour Co-op	Ted Graham	10,518	27.39	
Liberal	Charles T Ross	7,202	18.76	
Majority		10,157	26.46	
Turnout		38,395	80.09	
Conservative hold		Swing		

=== Elections in the 1970s ===
General election 1970: Enfield West
Party	Candidate	Votes	%	±%
Conservative	Iain Macleod	21,858	57.90	
Labour	Herbert C King	9,896	26.22	
Liberal	Julian Francis Burnett	4,820	12.77	
National Front	Kenneth Taylor	1,175	3.11	New
Majority		11,962	31.68	
Turnout		37,749		
Conservative hold		Swing		

On 20 July 1970, one month after his appointment as Chancellor of the Exchequer, Ian Macleod died of a heart attack in No 11 Downing Street. Consequently a by-election was called.

1970 Enfield West by-election
Party	Candidate	Votes	%	±%
Conservative	Cecil Parkinson	15,205	57.18	−0.72
Labour	Herbert C King	6,926	26.05	−0.17
Liberal	Anthony Stowell	3,283	12.35	−0.42
National Front	Kenneth Taylor	1,176	4.42	+1.31
Majority		8,279	31.13	−0.56
Turnout		26,590		
Conservative hold		Swing		

Parliament of the United Kingdom
Preceded by Birmingham Stechford	Constituency represented by the chancellor of the Exchequer; 1970	Succeeded by Altrincham and Sale
