= Hertsmere (constituency) =

UK Parliament constituency (since 1983)

Coordinates: 51°40′N 0°16′W

- County constituency for the House of Commons
- Interactive map of boundaries since 2024
- Boundary within the East of England
- County: Hertfordshire
- Electorate: 73,256 (March 2020)
- Major settlements: Borehamwood, Potters Bar and Bushey

Current constituency
- Created: 1983
- Member of Parliament: Oliver Dowden (Conservative)
- Seats: One
- Created from: South Hertfordshire and South West Hertfordshire

Hertsmere is a constituency (Note: A county constituency (for the purposes of election expenses and type of returning officer).) in Hertfordshire, England, represented in the House of Commons since 2015 by Sir Oliver Dowden of the Conservative Party, who is a former deputy prime minister. (Note: As with all constituencies, the constituency elects one Member of Parliament (MP) by the first past the post system of election at least every five years.)

== Constituency profile ==
Just beyond the northwestern boundary of Greater London and with fast railway links into the capital, Hertsmere is a Parliamentary constituency in the Home Counties. The constituency is in the London Commuter Belt, largely inside London's orbital motorway, the M25, and within the London green belt, in the South-West of Hertfordshire. Political consultancy Electoral Calculus classifies the constituency's population as broadly Conservative 'kind yuppies'. Hertsmere has the third-highest Jewish population of any UK Parliamentary constituency.

According to the census for England and Wales, the population of the Hertsmere local authority area (which presently corresponds to the area of the Parliamentary constituency) has increased by 7.8%, from around 100,000 in 2011 to 107,800 in 2021. This is higher than the overall increase for England (6.6%), where the population grew by nearly 3.5 million to 56,489,800, but slightly lower than the increase for the East of England region that Hertsmere belongs to (8.3%). The fastest growing age group in Hertsmere is the over-65s, which has increased since 2011 by 17.6%, close to the overall rate of growth for this age group in England (20.1%).

Parts of the constituency are among the most prosperous in Britain but 2015 data from the English Multiple deprivation index for the Borough of Hertsmere shows widely varying levels of deprivation, with overall deprivation levels – on a scale from 1 (the most deprived) to 32,844 (the least deprived) – ranging from 3,049 for Borehamwood Cowley Hill, the most deprived area in Hertfordshire and in the 10% most deprived nationally, to 32,695 for Bushey Heath, in the 1% least deprived.

The constituency of Hertsmere has returned a Conservative Member of Parliament at every general election since its creation and has been a safe seat almost throughout, with majorities ranging from 3,075 in 1997 (the election in which Labour won 418 Parliamentary seats, the largest number ever held by a single party) to 21,313 in 2019 (when the Conservative Party won 365 seats and a Parliamentary majority of 85). A close result for second place occurred in 2010, with only 661 votes separating the Labour Party and Liberal Democrat candidates.

In the history of the constituency the Liberal Democrat vote share has fallen substantially, from a quarter of the vote and second place ahead of Labour in 1983, to less than half that and third place in 2019. In 2015 the party fell to fourth place.

== Boundaries and composition ==
=== 1983–1997 ===
- The Borough of Hertsmere; and
- The City of St Albans ward of London Colney.

The new county constituency was formed largely from the bulk of the abolished constituency of South Hertfordshire. It also included the area comprising the former Urban District of Bushey, transferred from South West Hertfordshire.

=== 1997–2024 ===
Map of boundaries 1997–2024

From 1997 to 2024 the constituency was coterminous with the borough of Hertsmere in southern Hertfordshire (before then it had also included the City of St Albans ward of London Colney, which was transferred to the St Albans constituency).

Following its review of parliamentary representation in Hertfordshire, the Boundary Commission recommended no changes to constituency boundaries for the 2010 general election. The seat contained these electoral wards:

- Aldenham East, Aldenham West, Borehamwood Brookmeadow, Borehamwood Cowley Hill, Borehamwood Hillside, Borehamwood Kenilworth, Bushey Heath, Bushey North, Bushey Park, Bushey St James, Elstree, Potters Bar Furzefield, Potters Bar Oakmere, Potters Bar Parkfield, Shenley.

=== Current ===
In 2021 the Boundary Commission for England, as part of the 2023 review of Westminster constituencies, published draft changes to constituency boundaries. On 8 November 2022, the final draft of the Boundary Commission's proposals was published, following consultation. The revised Hertsmere CC (County Constituency) was as proposed in the previous draft and became effective for the 2024 general election. Although the electorate of the constituency was within 5% of the new 'electoral quota' of 73,393, the commission proposed that changes be made to enable neighbouring constituencies to remain within the electoral range. The borough ward of Bushey North, previously in the Hertsmere constituency, joined the Watford constituency and the Welwyn Hatfield borough ward of Northaw and Cuffley, previously in the Broxbourne constituency, joined Hertsmere. The new Hertsmere constituency contains an electorate of approximately 73,256.

Hertsmere consists of the major towns and villages of Bushey, Radlett, Potters Bar and Borehamwood, elevated settlements above the headwaters of the River Colne which forms much of the northern border. Bushey borders Watford and the London Borough of Harrow to the west and south west, while Potters Bar borders Barnet and Broxbourne on the east. Borehamwood is just south-east of the centre, the largest town in the constituency — in the north and centre is Radlett, separated by two large villages and farms from St Albans to the north.

== Members of Parliament ==
This safe Conservative constituency was created in 1983 from the former seat of South Hertfordshire. Cecil Parkinson, who had entered Parliament in 1970 and had previously represented South Hertfordshire, was MP from the seat's creation until his retirement in 1992. He was a close ally of Prime Minister Margaret Thatcher and had run her successful 1983 election campaign. Parkinson stepped down from government on the day of Thatcher's resignation as Conservative Party leader.

James Clappison held the seat for five electoral terms, from 1992 until his decision to stand down from parliament at the 2015 general election.

The seat was subsequently won by Oliver Dowden.

Election	Member	Party
1983	Cecil Parkinson	Conservative
1992	James Clappison	Conservative
2015	Oliver Dowden	Conservative

== Elections ==
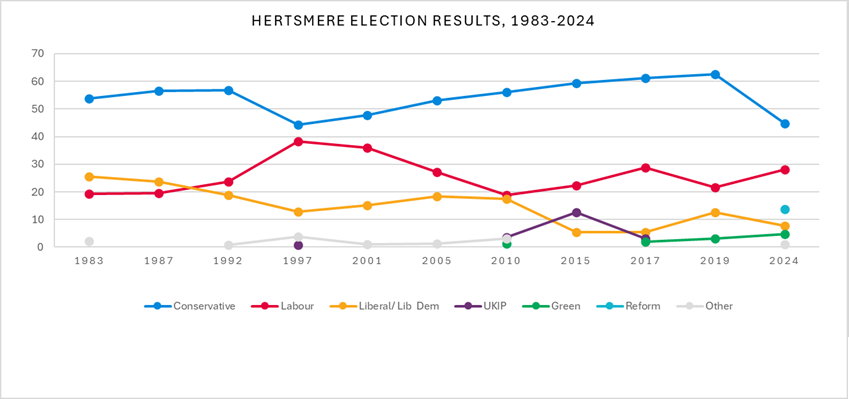
Hertsmere election results 1983–2024

=== Elections in the 2020s ===
General election 2024: Hertsmere
Party	Candidate	Votes	%	±%
Conservative	Oliver Dowden	21,451	44.7	−20.2
Labour	Josh Tapper	13,459	28.0	+6.9
Reform	Darren Selkus	6,584	13.7	New
Liberal Democrats	Emma Matanle	3,710	7.7	−3.2
Green	John Humphries	2,267	4.7	+1.6
Independent	Ray Bolster	536	1.1	New
Majority		7,992	16.7	−24.1
Turnout		48,007	65.3	−6.4
Registered electors		73,518		
Conservative hold		Swing	−13.6	

=== Elections in the 2010s ===
2019 notional result
Party	Vote	%
Conservative	34,083	64.9
Labour	11,103	21.1
Liberal Democrats	5,713	10.9
Green	1,614	3.1
Turnout	52,513	71.7
Electorate	73,256	

General election 2019: Hertsmere
Party	Candidate	Votes	%	±%
Conservative	Oliver Dowden	32,651	62.5	+1.4
Labour	Holly Kal-Weiss	11,338	21.7	−7.0
Liberal Democrats	Stephen Barrett	6,561	12.6	+7.3
Green	John Humphries	1,653	3.2	+1.3
Majority		21,313	40.8	+8.4
Turnout		52,203	70.6	−0.6
Conservative hold		Swing	+4.2	

General election 2017: Hertsmere
Party	Candidate	Votes	%	±%
Conservative	Oliver Dowden	31,928	61.1	+1.8
Labour	Fiona Smith	14,977	28.7	+6.3
Liberal Democrats	Joe Jordan	2,794	5.3	−0.2
UKIP	David Hoy	1,564	3.0	−9.7
Green	Sophie Summerhayes	990	1.9	New
Majority		16,951	32.4	−4.5
Turnout		52,389	71.2	+3.3
Conservative hold		Swing	−2.3	

General election 2015: Hertsmere
Party	Candidate	Votes	%	±%
Conservative	Oliver Dowden	29,696	59.3	+3.3
Labour	Richard Butler	11,235	22.4	+3.6
UKIP	Frank Ward	6,383	12.7	+9.1
Liberal Democrats	Sophie Bowler	2,777	5.5	−11.9
Majority		18,461	36.9	−0.3
Turnout		50,091	67.9	+3.2
Conservative hold		Swing	−0.2	

General election 2010: Hertsmere
Party	Candidate	Votes	%	±%
Conservative	James Clappison	26,476	56.0	+2.8
Labour	Sam Russell	8,871	18.8	−8.4
Liberal Democrats	Anthony Rowlands	8,210	17.4	−1.0
UKIP	David Rutter	1,712	3.6	New
BNP	Daniel Seabrook	1,397	3.0	New
Green	Arjuna Krishna-Das	604	1.3	New
Majority		17,605	37.2	+11.2
Turnout		47,270	64.7	+1.7
Conservative hold		Swing	+5.6	

=== Elections in the 2000s ===
General election 2005: Hertsmere
Party	Candidate	Votes	%	±%
Conservative	James Clappison	22,665	53.2	+5.4
Labour	Kelly Tebb	11,572	27.2	−8.8
Liberal Democrats	Jonathan Davies	7,817	18.4	+3.2
Socialist Labour	James Dry	518	1.2	+0.2
Majority		11,093	26.0	+14.2
Turnout		42,572	63.0	+2.7
Conservative hold		Swing	+7.1	

General election 2001: Hertsmere
Party	Candidate	Votes	%	±%
Conservative	James Clappison	19,855	47.8	+3.5
Labour	Hilary Broderick	14,953	36.0	−2.2
Liberal Democrats	Paul Thompson	6,300	15.2	+2.4
Socialist Labour	James Dry	397	1.0	New
Majority		4,902	11.8	+5.7
Turnout		41,505	60.3	−13.7
Conservative hold		Swing	+2.9	

=== Elections in the 1990s ===
General election 1997: Hertsmere
Party	Candidate	Votes	%	±%
Conservative	James Clappison	22,305	44.3	−12.5
Labour	Beth Kelly	19,230	38.2	+14.5
Liberal Democrats	Ann Gray	6,466	12.8	−6.1
Referendum	James Marlow	1,703	3.4	New
UKIP	Rodney Saunders	453	0.9	New
Natural Law	Nigel Kahn	191	0.4	New
Majority		3,075	6.1	−27.0
Turnout		50,348	74.0	−6.9
Conservative hold		Swing	−13.5	

General election 1992: Hertsmere
Party	Candidate	Votes	%	±%
Conservative	James Clappison	32,133	56.8	+0.2
Labour	David Souter	13,398	23.7	+4.1
Liberal Democrats	Zerbanoo Gifford	10,681	18.9	−4.9
Natural Law	Diana Harding	373	0.7	New
Majority		18,735	33.1	+0.3
Turnout		56,585	80.9	+5.5
Conservative hold		Swing	−2.1	

=== Elections in the 1980s ===
General election 1987: Hertsmere
Party	Candidate	Votes	%	±%
Conservative	Cecil Parkinson	31,278	56.6	+3.4
Liberal	Laurence Brass	13,172	23.8	−1.8
Labour	Frank Ward	10,835	19.6	+0.4
Majority		18,106	32.8	+5.2
Turnout		55,285	75.4	+1.7
Conservative hold		Swing	+2.6	

General election 1983: Hertsmere
Party	Candidate	Votes	%	±%
Conservative	Cecil Parkinson	28,628	53.2	
Liberal	Zerbanoo Gifford	13,758	25.6	
Labour	Ian Reed	10,315	19.2	
Independent Communist	Ronald Parkinson	1,116	2.1	
Majority		14,870	27.6	
Turnout		53,817	73.7	
Conservative win (new seat)				

== See also ==
- Parliamentary constituencies in Hertfordshire
- Parliamentary constituencies in the East of England
