= Uganda Relationships Commission =

The Uganda Relationships Commission, also known as the Munster Commission, was a body established by the Government of the United Kingdom to make recommendations on the best form of government for an independent Uganda.

== History ==
Britain had established the Uganda Protectorate in 1894, formalising British control over Uganda, but was by 1960 pursuing a policy of managed decolonisation. This required the establishment of what the British Government hoped would be stable, democratic institutions in her colonies, including Uganda.

The Relationships Commission was formally established by Reginald Maudling, as Secretary of State for the Colonies, on 15 December 1960. It was to be headed by the Earl of Munster and was tasked with "consider[ing] the future form of government best suited to Uganda the question of the relationship between the Central Government and the other authorities in Uganda". In this sense it was a particular response to the desire of the Kingdom of Buganda, as set out in its memorandum of 24 September 1960, to "go it alone" rather than continue progress towards a united Uganda as the British Government favoured. This disagreement had created significant political unrest in Buganda, culminating in the de facto Bugandan boycott of the general election held on the 23 March 1961.

The Commission started work in January 1961 and reported in June. It recommended "a federal position for Buganda, because she has virtually reached that position already, and a federal position for the three Kingdoms [of Bunyoro, Ankole and Toro]... The three Kingdoms would have substantial elements of federalism for their own internal purposes, but in relation to the Central government they would be in roughly the same position as the other districts [i.e. regions of Uganda not part of one of the Kingdoms]." The Commission also recommended the codification of Ugandan customary law.

The Commission's recommendations formed the basis for proposals discussed at the Ugandan Constitutional Conference, held at Lancaster House in September and October 1961.
