= Iain Macleod =

British politician (1913–1970)

The Right Honourable Iain Macleod
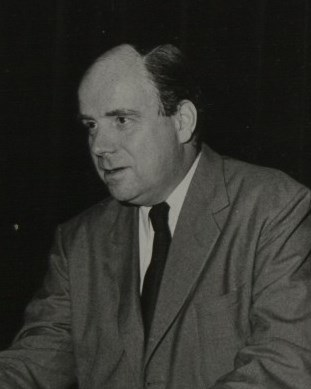
- Macleod in 1961

Chancellor of the Exchequer
- In office 20 June 1970 – 20 July 1970
- Prime Minister: Edward Heath
- Preceded by: Roy Jenkins
- Succeeded by: Anthony Barber

Shadow Chancellor of the Exchequer
- In office 11 November 1965 – 20 June 1970
- Leader: Edward Heath
- Preceded by: Edward Heath
- Succeeded by: Roy Jenkins

Leader of the House of Commons
- In office 9 October 1961 – 20 October 1963
- Prime Minister: Harold Macmillan
- Preceded by: Rab Butler
- Succeeded by: Selwyn Lloyd

Chancellor of the Duchy of Lancaster
- In office 9 October 1961 – 20 October 1963
- Prime Minister: Harold Macmillan
- Preceded by: Charles Hill
- Succeeded by: The Lord Blakenham

Chairman of the Conservative Party
- In office 9 October 1961 – 20 October 1963
- Leader: Harold Macmillan
- Preceded by: Rab Butler
- Succeeded by: The Lord Blakenham

Secretary of State for the Colonies
- In office 14 October 1959 – 9 October 1961
- Prime Minister: Harold Macmillan
- Preceded by: Alan Lennox-Boyd
- Succeeded by: Reginald Maudling

Minister of Labour and National Service
- In office 20 December 1955 – 14 October 1959
- Prime Minister: Anthony Eden; Harold Macmillan
- Preceded by: Walter Monckton
- Succeeded by: Edward Heath

Minister of Health
- In office 7 May 1952 – 20 December 1955
- Prime Minister: Winston Churchill; Anthony Eden
- Preceded by: Harry Crookshank
- Succeeded by: Robin Turton

Member of Parliament for Enfield West
- In office 23 February 1950 – 20 July 1970
- Preceded by: Ernest Davies (Enfield)
- Succeeded by: Cecil Parkinson

Personal details
- Born: Iain Norman Macleod; 11 November 1913 Skipton, United Kingdom
- Died: 20 July 1970 (aged 56) London, United Kingdom
- Party: Conservative
- Spouse: Evelyn Blois (m. 1941)
- Children: 2
- Education: Gonville and Caius College, Cambridge

Iain Norman Macleod (11 November 1913 – 20 July 1970) was a British Conservative Party politician. A playboy and professional bridge player in his twenties, after war service Macleod worked for the Conservative Research Department before entering Parliament in 1950. He was noted as a formidable Parliamentary debater and—later—as a platform orator. He was quickly appointed Minister of Health, later serving as Minister of Labour. He served an important term as Secretary of State for the Colonies under Harold Macmillan in the early 1960s, overseeing the independence of many African countries from British rule but earning the enmity of Conservative right-wingers, and the soubriquet that he was "too clever by half".

Macleod was unhappy with the "emergence" of Sir Alec Douglas-Home as party leader and prime minister in succession to Macmillan in 1963 (he claimed to have supported Macmillan's deputy Rab Butler, although it is unclear exactly what his recommendation had been). He refused to serve in Home's government, and while serving as editor of The Spectator alleged that the succession had been stitched up by Macmillan and a "magic circle" of Old Etonians.

Macleod did not contest the first ever Conservative Party leadership election in 1965, but endorsed the eventual winner Edward Heath. When the Conservatives returned to power in June 1970, he was appointed Chancellor of the Exchequer in Heath's government, but died suddenly only a month later.

== Early life ==
Iain Macleod was born at Clifford House, Skipton, Yorkshire, on 11 November 1913. His father, Dr. Norman Alexander Macleod, was a well-respected general practitioner in Skipton, with a substantial poor-law practice (providing medical services for those who could not afford to pay); the young Macleod would often accompany his father on his rounds. His parents were from the Isle of Lewis in the Western Isles of Scotland, his father a descendant of tenant farmers on Pabbay and Uig, tracing back to the early 1500s. His branch of the Macleods of Pabbay was a branch of the Chiefs of MacLeods of Lewis. They moved to Skipton in 1907. Macleod grew up with strong personal and cultural ties to Scotland, as his parents bought in 1917 part of the Leverhulme estate on the Isle of Lewis, where they often used to stay for family holidays.

He was educated at Ermysted's Grammar School in Skipton, followed by four years (beginning in 1923) at St Ninian's Dumfriesshire, followed by five years at the private school Fettes College in Edinburgh. Macleod showed no great academic talent, but did develop an enduring love of literature, especially poetry, which he read and memorised in great quantity. In his final year at school Macleod appears to have blossomed a little, standing for Oswald Mosley's New Party in the mock election in October 1931; he came third, behind the Unionist and Ian Harvey who stood as a Scottish nationalist and came second. He won the School History Prize in his final year.

== Cambridge and cards ==
In 1932, Macleod went up to Gonville and Caius College, Cambridge, where he read history. His only recorded speech at the Cambridge Union Society was in his first term against the Ottawa agreement – his biographer comments that although not too much should be made of this, it suggests a lack of sentimental attachment to the Empire. He took no other part in student politics, but spent much of his time reading poetry and playing bridge, both for the University (he helped to found the Cambridge University Bridge Society) and at Crockfords and in the West End. He graduated with a Lower Second in 1935.

A bridge connection with the chairman of the printing company De La Rue earned him a job offer. However, he devoted most of his energies to bridge and, by 1936, was an international bridge player. He was one of the great British bridge players. He won the Gold Cup in 1937, with teammates Maurice Harrison-Gray (Capt), Skid Simon, Jack Marx and Colin Harding.

At a time when average male earnings were around £200 per annum (around £20,000 at 2025 prices) and he was earning around £150 per annum at De La Rue, Macleod sometimes made £100 in a night gambling, but on another occasion had to borrow £100 from his father to pay his debts. Macleod was often too tired to work in the mornings after gambling for much of the night, although he tended to perk up as the day went on; he was popular with colleagues and on at least one occasion mucked in to work overtime for a last-minute order for Chinese banknotes. His biographer comments that he "might have stayed" had he found the work more interesting, but after tolerating him for a number of years De La Rue sacked him in 1938.

In order to placate his father he joined the Inner Temple and went through the motions of studying to become a barrister, but in the late 1930s he was essentially living the life of a playboy from his bridge earnings. He was winning up to £2,500 per annum tax free (around £200,000 at 2025 prices).

He later wrote a book that contains a description of the Acol system of bidding: Bridge is an Easy Game, published in 1952 by Falcon Press, London. He was still earning money from playing and writing newspaper columns about bridge until 1952, when his developing political career became his priority.

== War service ==
=== Early war ===
In September 1939, upon the outbreak of the Second World War, Macleod enlisted in the British Army as a private in the Royal Fusiliers. On 20 April 1940, he was commissioned as an officer with the rank of second lieutenant in the Duke of Wellington's Regiment (DWR), with the service number 129352. He was posted to the 2/7th Battalion, DWR, which was then serving as part of the 137th Infantry Brigade of the 46th Infantry Division, a second line Territorial Army (TA) formation, then commanded by Major-General Henry Curtis. Macleod's battalion was sent overseas to France in time to see action in the Battle of France in May, where he was injured in the leg by a flying log when a German armoured car burst through a road block which his men had just erected. He was treated in hospital in Exeter and left with a lifelong slight limp. In later life, besides his limp he suffered pain and reduced mobility from the spinal condition ankylosing spondylitis.

At the age of 27, Macleod was already considered somewhat too old to be a platoon commander. Once fit for duty again, he served as a staff captain with the 46th Division in Wye, under the Deputy Assistant Adjutant General (DAAG), Captain Dawtry.

In 1941, a drunk Macleod almost killed Dawtry, as the latter had retired to bed rather than play stud poker with him. He shot at his door until his revolver ran out of bullets, and then passed out after smashing down the door with a heavy piece of furniture. He demanded an apology the next morning for his refusal to play, although the two men remained friends thereafter. Dawtry later became Chief Clerk of Westminster Council.

=== Staff College, D-Day and European campaign ===
Macleod attended Staff College, Camberley, in 1943, and graduated early in February 1944. His biographer comments that for the first time he had had to test his abilities against other able men and found something of a purpose in life.

As a major, he landed in France on Gold Beach on D-Day on 6 June 1944, as Deputy Assistant Quartermaster general (DAQMG) of the 50th (Northumbrian) Infantry Division, a first line TA formation, under the command of Major-General Douglas Graham. Macleod embarked on 1 June ready for the invasion, which was then postponed from 5 June to 6 June. The 50th Division, a highly experienced veteran formation which had fought in North Africa and Sicily, was tasked with capturing Arromanches, where the Mulberry artificial harbour was to be set up, and by the end of the day patrols had pushed to the outskirts of Bayeux. Macleod spent much of the day touring the beachhead area to check on progress, driving past enemy-held strongpoints, with Lieutenant Colonel "Bertie" Gibb. He later recorded that he had "a patchwork of memories" of D-Day. He could remember what he ate but not when he ate it, or that when he went to load his revolver he found his batman had instead filled his ammunition pouch with boiled sweets. British planners had expected 40% casualties on D-Day, and Macleod later recorded that he himself had fully expected to be killed, but on realising at midnight that he had survived D-Day decided that he would survive the war and see the birth of his second child in October.

Contemporaries began to record him saying that autumn that he planned to enter politics and become prime minister. He continued to serve in France and the Low Countries until November 1944, when the 50th Division was, due to a highly critical shortage of manpower in the British Army at this stage of the war, ordered to return to Yorkshire to be reconstituted as a training division. Macleod ended the war as a major.

=== 1945 election and final Army service ===
Macleod unsuccessfully contested the Western Isles constituency at the 1945 general election. There was no Conservative Party in the seat, so Macleod advertised an inaugural meeting. He and his father, a lifelong Liberal but an admirer of Winston Churchill, were the only attendees, so Macleod elected his father Association Chairman and he selected his son as Parliamentary candidate, in due course receiving a letter of endorsement from Churchill. Macleod came bottom of the poll, obtaining 2,756 votes out of 13,000. Macleod's father died at the start of 1947, just at the onset of the exceptionally bitter winter.

With the 50th Division now largely disbanded, its HQ was sent to Norway after the end of hostilities in May 1945 as part of Operation Doomsday, supervising the surrender of German forces and repatriation of Allied prisoners. In Norway, Macleod was in charge of setting prices for the country's stock of wine and spirits, much of which had been looted by the Germans from occupied France. In December 1945, he successfully defended a colonel at a court martial, and was tipped for a career at the Bar by the presiding officer. He was demobilised from the British Army in January 1946.

== Entry into politics ==
In 1946, after an interview with David Clarke, Macleod joined the Conservative Parliamentary Secretariat, writing briefing papers for Conservative MPs on Scotland, labour (employment, in modern parlance) and health matters.

Macleod was selected as Conservative candidate for Enfield in 1946. Forty-seven applicants were already being considered; through a bridge connection Macleod arranged a meeting with the Enfield Conservative Association chairman and persuaded him to add his CV to the list. After interviews, he reached the final shortlist of four. Macleod came second after making a poor speech to the assembled Association at the selection meeting, but the winning candidate failed to achieve the required 10% majority. Amid accusations of skulduggery—the members had not been told of this requirement in advance and forty of them, the representatives of two branches, walked out in protest—a second meeting was scheduled, at which Macleod performed much better and won handsomely. Throughout both meetings he had been strongly supported by the local Young Conservatives, who could vote on Association matters despite in some cases being not yet old enough to vote for Parliament – the 15-year-old Norman Tebbit was a branch officer for Ponders End (a working class area).

Enfield had been won by the Conservatives several times in the interwar period, but with a 12,000 Labour majority in 1945 was not regarded as an immediate prospect. In 1948, the Parliamentary boundaries were redrawn, and Macleod was unanimously selected for the new and much more winnable Enfield West, which he would win in February 1950 and hold comfortably throughout his career.

In 1948, the Secretariat merged with the Conservative Research Department under Rab Butler. Macleod was in joint, then sole, charge of Home Affairs. He drafted the Social Services section of the Conservative policy paper The Right Road for Britain (1949).

Along with Enoch Powell, Angus Maude and Reginald Maudling, Macleod was seen as a protégé of Butler at the CRD. David Clarke thought Macleod the least intellectually gifted of the three but later came to think him the most politically gifted. All four men were elected to Parliament in February 1950, and along with Edward Heath who entered Parliament at the same time they became members of the "One Nation" group. Together with Angus Maude, Macleod wrote the pamphlet One Nation in 1950, and together with Enoch Powell he wrote The Social Services: Needs and Means which appeared in January 1952.

Macleod and Powell were close friends at this time. He was astonished when the ascetic Powell became engaged. Powell, a much more industrious man, was somewhat jealous of Macleod's promotion at the Research Department, and had difficulty being selected for a winnable seat, so Macleod coached him in interview technique.

== Political career ==
=== Minister of Health ===
In October 1951 Churchill again became prime minister. Macleod was not offered office but instead became Chairman of the backbench Health and Social Services Committee.

A brilliant Commons performance made his career. On 27 March 1952, having been called fifth in the debate rather than third as originally scheduled, he spoke after former Health Minister Aneurin Bevan. Beginning his speech with the words "I wish to deal closely and with relish with the vulgar, crude and intemperate speech to which the House of Commons has just listened", he attacked Bevan with facts and figures and commented that a health debate without Bevan would be like "Hamlet without the first gravedigger". Churchill, who had been getting up to leave, stayed to listen and was heard to ask the Chief Whip, Patrick Buchan-Hepburn, who the promising young backbencher was. When summoned to 10 Downing Street on 7 May, he claimed to have been half-expecting a reprimand for his refusal to serve a second term as a British representative at the Council of Europe, a job he found boring, but he was instead appointed Minister of Health, which was not a Cabinet position at that time.

Later in 1952, Macleod announced that British clinician Richard Doll had proved the link between smoking and lung cancer. He did so at a press conference throughout which he chain-smoked.

Macleod became a member of White's Club in 1953, and shocked members by sitting up all night to play cards. His friend Enoch Powell was jealous at Macleod's rapid promotion, but offered Macleod the use of a room at his flat when Eve Macleod was seriously ill with polio.

Macleod consolidated rather than reformed the NHS, administered it well and defended it against Treasury attacks on its budget.

=== Minister of Labour ===
In the reshuffle of December 1955, Prime Minister Anthony Eden promoted Macleod to the Cabinet as Minister of Labour and National Service. Eden regarded Macleod, still only 42 years old, as a possible future prime minister and thought the job would be valuable experience of dealing with trade unions.

==== Suez crisis ====
Macleod was not directly involved in the collusion with France and Israel over the Suez Crisis, but although he was unhappy at the turn of events, he did not resign. He never publicly opposed Suez, either at the time or later. He was party to the two crucial Cabinet decisions: the first was the decision on 21 March for a policy of hostility to Nasser, who was seen as a threat to British interests in the Middle East, and of building new alliances with Jordan and Iraq; this led to the withdrawal of American and British financial aid for the Aswan Dam, which in turn triggered Nasser's nationalisation of the Canal. Macleod was also party to the Cabinet decision on 27 July, the day after nationalisation the Canal, that Nasser's action should be opposed on the grounds that the Canal was an international trust and that Britain, if necessary acting alone, should use force as a last resort. Macleod was not a member of the Egypt Committee, and still less was he party to Eden and Lloyd's secret dealings with the French and the Israelis.

Macleod's duties required him to discuss the Suez Crisis with union leaders. In August 1956, he spoke to Vincent Tewson, General Secretary of the TUC, and found him "very "weak-kneed"" and "ill-informed". On 20 August, Macleod and Eden met Tewson, Beard of the Engineers' Union and Geddes of the Postmen's Union, and agreed that the upcoming TUC Conference would back an equivocal resolution by Geddes.

On 25 August, the day after Monckton's "outburst" expressing doubts at the Egypt Committee, Cabinet Secretary Norman Brook sent a note to Eden listing Macleod as among those Cabinet members (the others being Butler, Monckton, Derrick Heathcoat Amory, the Earls of Selkirk and Kilmuir, as well as Heath who, as Chief Whip, attended Cabinet but was not technically a full member) who would want to postpone military action until all other options had been exhausted or until Nasser provided them with a better pretext, whichever came first. There were three unknowns and ten hawks—a narrow Cabinet majority in favour of military action.

On 11 September, at Cabinet, Eden tasked Macleod with finding out if there would be trouble from the unions in the event of military operations in the Eastern Mediterranean. However, Norman Brook advised Macleod to "hold his hand for the moment, as this was not the appropriate time". It is unclear if this initiative came from Brook or was in response to an inquiry from Macleod himself.

==== Suez: decision to invade ====
Macleod missed the thinly-attended Cabinet on 18 October, but afterwards was sent Eden's minute that he'd told the French that every effort must be made to stop Israel attacking Jordan, whilst Eden had told Israel that Britain would not come to Egypt's aid. It is not known whether Macleod knew of the secret Protocol of Sèvres. On 23 October, Eden told the Cabinet that there had been secret talks with Israel in Paris.

The Cabinet further considered the use of force on 24 October. On 25 October, Eden told the Cabinet that Israel would attack Egypt after all, but did not tell them about the secret Sèvres Protocol. Cabinet minutes record that Macleod was doubtful about the use of force (as were Monckton and Heathcoat Amory) because of the lack of clear UN authority and the risk of antagonising the USA. However, they did not formally dissent from the Cabinet decision to invade if Israel attacked Egypt (the Cabinet were deceived about the extent to which such an attack had already been secretly agreed – "collusion" – by Eden and Selwyn Lloyd).

At Cabinet on the morning of 30 October, Lloyd reported that the US was ready to move a motion at the UN condemning Israel, which had attacked Egypt in the Sinai the previous day, as an aggressor. Macleod and Heathcoat Amory approved of Lloyd's suggestion of postponing the attack by 24 hours (in breach, as it happens, of the secret agreement between Britain, France and Israel) in order to bring the Americans on board, although they thought it unlikely to work, but it was not adopted. Macleod was telling others of his dismay that ministers had not been fully informed of the agreement with France and Israel. Either now or at some subsequent meeting Eden apologised to the Cabinet for his reticence "in time of war", causing Macleod to snap "I was not aware that we were at war, Prime Minister!" The Anglo-French ultimatum was on the afternoon of 30 October.

On 2 November, the Cabinet agreed that even in the event of a ceasefire between Egypt and Israel, Anglo-French forces should still seize the Canal in a policing role until UN forces were able to take up the baton (Macleod and Heathcoat Amory were doubtful). By the weekend of 3–4 November, fighting between Israel and Egypt had largely ceased. At Cabinet on Sunday 4 November, the Cabinet decided to go ahead with the landings (but hand over to peacekeeping duties to the UN at some future date, an option which Macleod (and Heathcoat Amory) argued was hardly compatible with use of force). The other options had been to postpone by 24 hours in the hope that Israel and Egypt might accept an Anglo-French occupation (a view supported by Butler, Kilmuir, Heathcote Amory and an "unnamed minister", presumed to be Macleod), or postpone indefinitely on the grounds that Israeli-Egyptian hostilities had already ceased (the view of Salisbury, Monckton and Buchan-Hepburn). Only Monckton had his dissent recorded, the others agreeing to accept the decision of the majority.

Randolph Churchill alleged that Macleod almost resigned on 4 November. Nigel Fisher wrote that this was not so, but that Macleod would have resigned if Butler had done so. Robert Carr, junior minister at the Ministry of Labour, wrote that Macleod had doubts but was not especially morally outraged, and saw no evidence that he planned to resign. William Rees-Mogg claimed that Butler persuaded Macleod not to resign, while a female friend of Macleod's recorded him turning up at her flat, demanding a drink, and declaring that he would have to resign having learned that Eden had deceived the Cabinet.

Suez alienated academics, journalists and other opinion-formers from the Conservative Party. William Rees-Mogg, then a Conservative candidate in the North-East, made a speech urging that Macleod be party leader. David Astor of The Observer, who on 4 November had attacked Eden for "crookedness" in an editorial, wrote to Macleod on 14 November, urging him as a younger minister to seize the party leadership so that collusion could be pinned on Eden and Lloyd, after Edward Boyle had told him that he was not interested and that Monckton was not up to it. Macleod did not reply but showed the letter to Freddie Bishop, head of the Prime Minister's Private Office, and Cabinet Secretary Norman Brook for their comments; Eden, who was on the verge of a breakdown, did not regard the matter as important. On 20 November 1956 the question of collusion was raised in Cabinet, with Eden and Lloyd (who was in New York at a United Nations meeting) both absent; Shepherd believes that it was probably Macleod who raised it. The Cabinet agreed to stick to Lloyd's formula that Britain had not incited the Israeli attack on Egypt.

==== 1958 bus strike ====
When Eden stepped down as prime minister in January 1957, Lord Kilmuir, formally witnessed by Lord Salisbury, took a straw poll of the Cabinet to determine his successor; despite his closeness to Butler, Macleod, along with the overwhelming majority of his colleagues, backed Harold Macmillan, regarding him as a stronger leader.

Macleod had intended at first to be a reforming Minister of Labour – he attempted, in the teeth of resistance from the TUC, to negotiate a Workers' Charter (a throwback to the Industrial Charter of the late 1940s) in return for a Contract of Service. He also hoped to take a tougher line with strikes than his predecessor Walter Monckton, whose explicit remit had been to appease the unions. The unions were beginning to become more militant, under the leadership of Frank Cousins, boss of the TGWU.

Macleod had to settle strikes in the shipbuilding and engineering industries in 1957, but in 1958 the government felt able to take a stronger line with the London bus strike. Macleod initially accepted his own chief Industrial Commissioner's Investigation into the busmens' case. Macmillan, backed by the Cabinet, insisted on settling a separate railwaymen's strike, despite an arbitration award against them, as it was felt that they had more public sympathy than the busmen. On the bus issue, Macleod was overruled and forced to pick a fight with Frank Cousins on the pretext that they accept an independent arbitration award.

Macmillan had picked a fight shrewdly, as the busmen had no allies amongst the other unions. Ernest Bevin or Arthur Deakin would not have allowed such a strike, but Cousins felt compelled to support it, and Opposition leader Hugh Gaitskell criticised the government in a speech at Glasgow. Gaitskell moved a motion of censure over Macleod's treatment of the strike. Macleod had recently demanded more debates on industrial relations but in his Commons speech of 8 May now criticised the opposition for demanding one. He moved the house to laugh at Gaitskell by quoting the line of "Mr Marx, of whom I am a devoted follower – Groucho, not Karl" "Sir, I never forget a face, but I will make an exception for yours". He then moved on to a blistering attack on Gaitskell, including the declaration that "I cannot conceal the scorn and contempt for the part that the Leader of the Opposition has played in this." He was discreetly congratulated afterwards by the Labour frontbencher Alf Robens. Roy Jenkins in 1993 described Macleod's attack on Gaitskell as "high order jugular debating", accusing Gaitskell of weak leadership in appeasing the militants of his own party and attacking him for refusing to endorse the findings of the arbitration tribunal.

Cousins wanted to call out the petrol tanker drivers, in breach of another agreement, but was blocked from doing so by the TUC. The strike ended after seven weeks, and Macmillan dated the government's recovery in the polls from this point. After the TUC refused to back him, Cousins had had to settle the London transport workers strike on terms which he could have obtained without striking. In October 1958 Macleod announced that he was letting the National Arbitration Tribunal go out of existence. Macleod had acquired a national reputation as a tough figure.

Macleod was on the Steering Committee to decide on political strategy in the runup to the 1959 election, at which the Macmillan government was re-elected.

=== Colonial Secretary ===
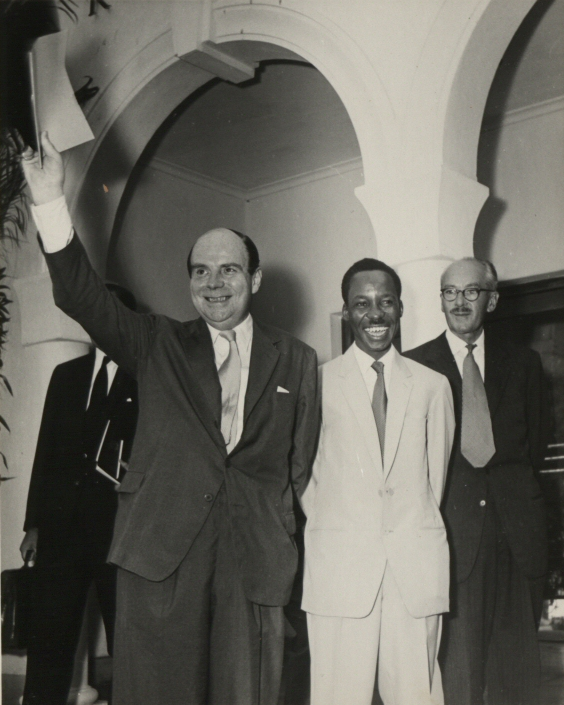
Macleod and Julius Nyerere at the Constitutional Conference, Tanganyika, March 1961

Macleod was appointed Secretary of State for the Colonies in October 1959. He had never set foot in any of Britain's colonies, but the Hola massacre in Kenya had helped focus his thinking on the inevitable end of Empire. He told Peter Goldman of the Conservative Research Department that he intended to be the last Colonial Secretary, although he later wrote that he "telescoped events rather than creating new ones". He saw Nigeria, British Somaliland, Tanganyika, Sierra Leone, Kuwait and British Cameroon become independent. He made a tour of Sub-Saharan Africa in 1960. He would often find himself in conflict with the more conservative Duncan Sandys, whom Macmillan had appointed Commonwealth Secretary as a counterweight to Macleod. Although Macmillan sympathised with Macleod's aspirations, he was sometimes disturbed at the speed with which he progressed matters, and did not always come down on his side in political disputes.

The state of emergency in Kenya was lifted on 12 January 1960, followed that same month by the Lancaster House Conference, containing Africans and some European delegates, including Macleod's brother Rhoderick, which agreed to a constitution and eventual black majority rule. Jomo Kenyatta was freed in August 1961, and Kenya later became self-governing in June 1963 and fully independent on 12 December 1963.

As the Secretary of State for the Colonies, Macleod attended the Ugandan Constitutional Conference at Lancaster House in 1961 alongside then-Governor of Uganda Sir Frederick Crawford and Ugandan politician A. G. Mehta. The conference resulted in the first Ugandan Constitution, which took effect on 9 October 1962.

In Nyasaland (later Malawi), he pushed for the release of Hastings Banda, contrary to the advice of the Governor and of other politicians. He had to threaten resignation in the Cabinet to get his own way, but won Macmillan round and Banda was released in April 1960 and almost immediately invited to London for talks aimed at bringing about independence. During a visit to Nyasaland in 1960, he is described as having been "gratuitously and grossly offensive, extremely rude and downright unpleasant at a meeting with the Governor, the provincial commissioners and senior police officers". On the following day, according to the same report, he "lost control of himself, shouted at the non-official members of Executive Council and told one of them to 'mind his own bloody business'". Elections were held in August 1961, and by 1962, the British and the Central African Federation cabinets had agreed that Nyasaland should be allowed to secede from the CAF; Banda was formally recognised as prime minister on 1 February 1963.

Macleod described his policy over Northern Rhodesia (modern Zambia) as "incredibly devious and tortuous" but "easily the one I am most proud of". Macleod's initial plan for a Legislative Council with an African majority (16 African members to 14 Europeans) was strongly opposed by Sir Roy Welensky, Prime Minister of the Central African Federation. After a long battle in the first half of 1961, and under pressure from cabinet colleagues, Macleod accepted Welensky's proposal for a council of 45 members, 15 of whom would be elected by a largely African electoral roll, 15 by a largely European roll, 14 by both rolls jointly (with a further stipulation that successful candidates had to gain at least 10% of the African votes and 10% of the European ones) and 1 by Asians. Macleod's role in these negotiations attracted damaging and much-remembered criticism by the party grandee, the Marquess of Salisbury, who had resigned from a senior position in the Cabinet over Cyprus in 1957. In a speech in the House of Lords on 7 March 1961, Salisbury denounced Macleod as "too clever by half" and accused him of bridge-table trickery. The new constitution, which was equally disliked by both Africans and Europeans, helped to weaken the Central African Federation, which was later wound up by Rab Butler at the Victoria Falls Conference on 5 July 1963.

The burden of hospitality left Macleod seriously out of pocket. However, hospitality helped achieve a deal with Julius Nyerere, leader of self-governing Tanganyika. Macleod was keen to point to a territory which was able to proceed peacefully to independence; it became fully independent in December 1961.

Macleod had no time to take any interest in the Pacific, South Arabia (modern-day Yemen and Oman), or the Mediterranean. He never met the Maltese leader Dom Mintoff. He described his lack of interest in the Caribbean Federation as "my main area of failure". In his final party conference speech as Colonial Secretary, in October 1961, he declared that "I believe quite simply in the brotherhood of man – men of all races, of all colours, of all creeds".

Welensky accused Macleod of a "mixture of cold calculation, sudden gushes of undignified emotion and ignorance of Africa". Historian Wm. Roger Louis wrote that "Macleod was to Africa as Mountbatten had been to India". Vernon Bogdanor has called him the greatest of Britain's colonial secretaries apart from Joseph Chamberlain.

During his period as Colonial Secretary, Macleod ordered the systematic destruction of colonial papers and evidence detailing criminal acts committed during the 1940s and 1950s, for fear that they would fall into the hands of post-independence governments. This was done partly to avoid potential embarrassment to Britain, and partly to protect natives who had cooperated with the British. Many documents related to the brutal suppression of the Mau Mau Uprising in Kenya.

=== Books ===
In 1961, Macleod published a sympathetic biography of former prime minister Neville Chamberlain, whose reputation then stood at a very low ebb because of recent memories of the Munich Agreement. The book was largely ghostwritten by Peter Goldman, whose own promising political career would be aborted when he lost the Orpington by-election the following year. Macleod was most interested in social policy and had most input into the parts up to 1931, including Chamberlain's time as Lord Mayor of Birmingham and as Minister of Health. It had been intended as a potboiler to earn money for his daughter's social season, and Macleod had been reluctant to read seven boxes of papers from Chamberlain's sister Hilda (Chamberlain's letters to whom are an important primary source); it added little to the portrait painted by his official biographer Keith Feiling.

Macleod used government papers in breach of the "Fifty-year rule" then in operation. Cabinet Secretary Sir Norman Brook persuaded the Prime Minister to demand amendments to conceal the degree of Cabinet involvement in the abdication of King Edward VIII (who was still alive in 1961) and the degree to which the civil servants Horace Wilson and Warren Fisher had demanded that the former King "reorder his private life" afterwards. Former prime minister Lord Avon, who cherished his (somewhat exaggerated) reputation as an opponent of "appeasement", complained that such a book by a serving Cabinet Minister might be thought to express official sympathy for Chamberlain's policies. Downing Street had to brief the press that Macleod had written purely in a personal capacity; Shepherd suggests that Macleod's loss of favour with Macmillan, who had also been an opponent of appeasement, was accelerated by this episode. Robert Blake wrote in his review in The Times (26 November 1961) that "when national security is at stake one does not judge a statesman by his successes at slum clearance". Macleod later told Alan Watkins (in "Brief Lives" 1982) "It was a bad book. I made a great mistake in writing it. It made me no money, and it has done me a lot of harm". Watkins conceded that the book "had been grudgingly and meanly reviewed". The book "sold poorly and was soon forgotten".

Macleod contracted to write a second book (due for September 1962, but postponed), called The Last Rung, on leading politicians who had failed to achieve prime ministerial office despite being widely expected to do so. He completed chapters on Austen Chamberlain, Lord Curzon and Lord Halifax, and planned to write a chapter about Rab Butler.

=== Leader of the House and Party Chairman, 1961–63 ===
In October 1961, to appease Conservative right-wingers and dampen down an area of political controversy, Macmillan replaced Macleod as Colonial Secretary with Reginald Maudling, a much more emollient figure. Macleod replaced his old mentor Rab Butler as Leader of the House of Commons and Chairman of the Conservative Party organisation. There was something of a conflict of interest between these two jobs as the former, which Butler would have liked to retain, required its incumbent to retain good professional relations with the Labour Party so as to keep the Parliamentary timetable running smoothly, whereas the latter required him to play a leading role in partisan campaigning. In order that he could have a salary he was also given the sinecure post of Chancellor of the Duchy of Lancaster, a less prestigious office than the other sinecures of Lord Privy Seal or Lord President of the Council.

Macleod's party chairmanship coincided with Selwyn Lloyd's tight economic policies, and poor by-election results, most notably Orpington in March 1962. He impressed on Macmillan the need for a major reshuffle in 1962, and recommended the dismissal of Selwyn Lloyd from the Exchequer although he did not have in mind anything as drastic as the "Night of the Long Knives" in which Macmillan sacked a third of his Cabinet. With the political scandals of 1962–63 (Vassall, Profumo) the Conservatives sank ever lower in the opinion polls.

=== Conservative leadership contest, 1963 ===
Harold Macmillan resigned as prime minister in October 1963. Despite Macleod's ability, as a result of his difficult term as Party Chairman, and memories of his time as Colonial Secretary, he was not a realistic candidate for the succession.

Macleod believed that the Earl of Home (later Sir Alec Douglas-Home after he had disclaimed his peerage) had behaved with less than complete honesty. He had initially appeared to rule himself out and had offered to help sample Cabinet opinion, before announcing his own candidacy. Macleod did not initially take Home's candidacy seriously, and did not realise the degree to which Macmillan was promoting it. When first told by his PPS Reginald Bennett that Home might be a candidate for the succession, Macleod snapped "Don't talk nonsense" and "absolute rot; it's not a possibility." Macleod gave his usual excellent conference speech at Blackpool on 11 October, unlike Maudling and Butler, who damaged their leadership chances by giving poor speeches, but Home's leadership bandwagon grew despite a mediocre but rapturously received speech.

When the results of the "customary processes" became known on 17 October (the "key day" as Macleod later called it), Macleod was, along with Enoch Powell, Lord Hailsham and Reginald Maudling, angered at the supposed choice of Home. Macleod thought the new prime minister should be a "moderniser", with views on the liberal wing of the party, and in the House of Commons. They attempted in vain to persuade Butler, Macmillan's deputy (who Macleod had assumed would succeed him) not to serve in any Home cabinet, in the hope that this would prevent Home from forming a government. Macleod and Powell eventually refused to serve under Home as prime minister. He wrote of Enoch Powell's decision not to serve "One does not expect to have many people with one in the last ditch".

Lord Dilhorne, who had polled the Cabinet for their preferences, had listed Macleod as "voting" for Home. Some have seen this as a mistake, others as evidence that the consultation process was heavily rigged (i.e. that anybody who expressed the slightest willingness to serve under Home as a compromise if necessary was listed as "supporting" him). Macmillan's official biographer Alistair Horne believed that Macleod's description of 17 October as "the key day" is evidence that he "changed his mind", having not previously had a particularly firm opinion. Macmillan's view was "well, you know … Macleod was a Highlander!" Others (e.g. Macmillan's biographer D. R. Thorpe) have suggested that Macleod actually did express a tactical preference for Home, in the hope of bringing about a deadlock in which he would enjoy bargaining power, or perhaps even become prime minister himself, and that his subsequent anger was a result of guilt that he had helped to bring about a Home "victory".

Butler himself observed that "Macleod was very shifty, much more so than you think". Nigel Lawson, later to succeed Macleod as editor of The Spectator, believed Macleod was "too clever by three quarters". "His petulant refusal to serve under Home and the extended explanation he gave for it both deprived the government of its most effective political street fighter and undermined the new prime minister's legitimacy" (The Daily Telegraph, 3 October 2004). However, Lord Aldington, David Eccles, Sir Michael Fraser and Eve Macleod all rejected this interpretation of Macleod's actions. Ian Gilmour argues that Macleod's subsequent refusal to serve under Home makes it "inconceivable" that he had voted for him.

Macleod's daughter Diana nearly died from appendicitis in October 1963, and it has been suggested that this may have affected his judgement. Nigel Fisher believed that Macleod had "some inner sourness" in 1963, attributable only in part to his daughter's serious illness, and largely to the fact that he himself was not being considered as a candidate. Roy Jenkins concurs.

Had he become prime minister, Butler had planned to make Macleod Chancellor of the Exchequer and had discussed the names of economists who could be asked to advise. Butler later wrote "I cannot help thinking that a man who always held all the bridge scores in his head, who seemed to know all the numbers, and played Vingt-et-un so successfully would have been useful".

=== The Spectator ===
Ian Gilmour appointed him editor of The Spectator. He wrote his own weekly column under the pseudonym of "Quoodle" and also sometimes wrote signed articles complaining about what the ODNB describes as his "pet hates" such as Harold Wilson or the BBC. He tolerated a range of political opinions amongst his journalists, including Alan Watkins.

On 17 January 1964 Macleod published a candid account of the 1963 party leadership contest, claiming that it was a conspiracy by an Etonian "magic circle". Macleod's article was written as a review of a book by Randolph Churchill, which he described as "Mr Macmillan's trailer for the screenplay of his memoirs". In his posthumously published book The Art of Memory (April 1982) Butler wrote that "every word" of the "Spectator" article "is true". Ian Gilmour also suggests that Dilhorne's refusal to speak out against Macleod in January 1964, when Macleod's credibility was at a low ebb, is strong evidence that Dilhorne knew his figures to be suspect.

Macmillan's biographer D. R. Thorpe does not accept Macleod's analysis, arguing that Home was well ahead of Butler in Cabinet preferences if Dilhorne's official figures are to be believed (although he accepts that Edward Boyle's preference was misrecorded as being for Home rather than Butler), and also criticises Macleod for only taking the preferences of the Cabinet into account, not those of junior ministers and backbenchers who were also polled.

After the Spectator article Macleod was censured by 15 votes to 14 (with 7 abstentions) by his local Conservative Association Executive Committee, but survived a No Confidence vote by 29 votes to 7. Peregrine Worsthorne attacked him as a social climber who had done his best to climb into the class at which he now sneered (e.g. by becoming a member of White's Club), but his biographer comments that a Conservative politician of that era had little option but to play the game by those social rules, and that Macleod had regarded himself as "commander class" since his time at Staff College during the war. Colleagues "cut" Macleod in the House of Commons after the article and the affair permanently damaged his chances of becoming leader. Macmillan later advised Home, if asked why the Conservatives could not find a prime minister in the Commons and had had to appoint a Lord, to retort that "The Spectator" could not find an editor from amongst the journalists' profession and had instead had to appoint Iain Macleod.

On the twentieth anniversary of D-Day Macleod wrote a Spectator article about his experiences (5 June 1964).

Macleod also became a non-executive director of Lombards Bank, which allowed him a chauffeur-driven car, which he needed as his spinal disability—he was increasingly unable to move his back or neck—meant that he was no longer able to drive. Roy Jenkins recalled him arriving at Parliament and stepping out of his large car "like a discontented gnome" stepping out a "golden coach".

=== Shadow Chancellor ===
Macleod returned to the shadow cabinet under Home following the 1964 election. His remit of opposing steel nationalisation came to naught as given his tiny majority Labour Prime Minister Harold Wilson did not proceed with this measure. Macleod's speech opposing steel nationalisation had been trailed as his comeback to frontline politics, but in the event was a damp squib. Nigel Fisher wrote that it was the only really bad speech of his career. Macleod did not contest the first ever Conservative Party leadership election in 1965, but backed Edward Heath, whom he did not particularly like but thought would be a better leader than Maudling. He expected to have received 40–45 votes had he stood.

The coinage of the word "stagflation" is attributed to him. Speaking in the House of Commons on 17 November 1965, he said: "We now have the worst of both worlds — not just inflation on the one side or stagnation on the other, but both of them together. We have a sort of 'stagflation' situation. And history, in modern terms, is indeed being made."

Macleod opposed the death penalty and supported legalisation of abortion and homosexuality; this did not help his acceptance by the more right-wing elements of his own party at the time. Macleod established good personal relations with several of his Labour opposite numbers, including both Bevan and James Callaghan, even though he clashed with Callaghan numerous times at the despatch box while serving as Shadow Chancellor in the 1960s (by contrast, he did not get on with Callaghan's successor as chancellor, Roy Jenkins, considering him vain and arrogant).

As Shadow Chancellor he concentrated on tax reform. Jenkins, Chancellor of the Exchequer at the time, wrote that he was never intimidated by him, and that Macleod concentrated on opposition rather than constructive proposals. Macleod planned to abolish Selective Employment Tax and to cut personal income tax, but not to increase indirect taxes, trusting that economic growth would make up the shortfall in revenue. He proposed a national lottery then opposed Jenkins when he proposed one; on another occasion he required Conservative MPs, to the irritation of some of them, to walk out of a select committee meeting in protest. Jenkins later recorded that Macleod was not "an amiable "shadow" ... no doubt he was in pain ... Perhaps he also had a premonition that time was running out for him."

As Shadow Chancellor in 1967 Iain Macleod helped to found the homeless charity Crisis. In 1968 Macleod defied a decision of the Shadow Cabinet by voting against the Labour Government's Commonwealth Immigration Bill, believing it to be a breach of promises made by the Conservative Government to the Kenyan Asians. He fell out with his former friend Enoch Powell over the latter's 1968 Rivers of Blood speech, after which Macleod refused to speak to Powell again. Macleod's subsequent dealings with him were, Powell said, as if he was a pariah though Macleod 'knew what I said was not motivated by what is crudely called racialism, but he behaved as if he did not know'. Powell's speech generated huge public support and Macleod was horrified at the open racism of many of the members of the public who wrote to him on the topic, likening them to the disgusting creatures which are revealed when one overturns a stone.

During this period Macleod was noted for his attacks on Wilson. He used to refer to Wilson as "the little man" even though Wilson was actually slightly taller than him. Some of Wilson's entourage used to refer to Macleod as "the poison dwarf" but Wilson had, in the words of Macleod's biographer, a "wary respect" for him. In the late 1960s he attacked Wilson in a public speech for accusing the Conservatives of being unpatriotic. He called Wilson "a man whose vision is limited to tomorrow's headline" and, in an oft-quoted line, that whereas President Kennedy had called himself "an idealist without illusions" Wilson was "an illusionist without ideals".

On 14 May 1970, in the House of Commons just before the General Election, when Wilson claimed that Conservative transport policies might result in an increase in children's road deaths (Labour had recently introduced the breathalyzer), he attacked him for trying to make political capital from such a topic, and was rebuked by the Speaker for shouting abuse (the exact words are not recorded in Hansard; according to another MP he shouted "swine!") at Wilson across the despatch box.

=== Chancellor of the Exchequer and death ===
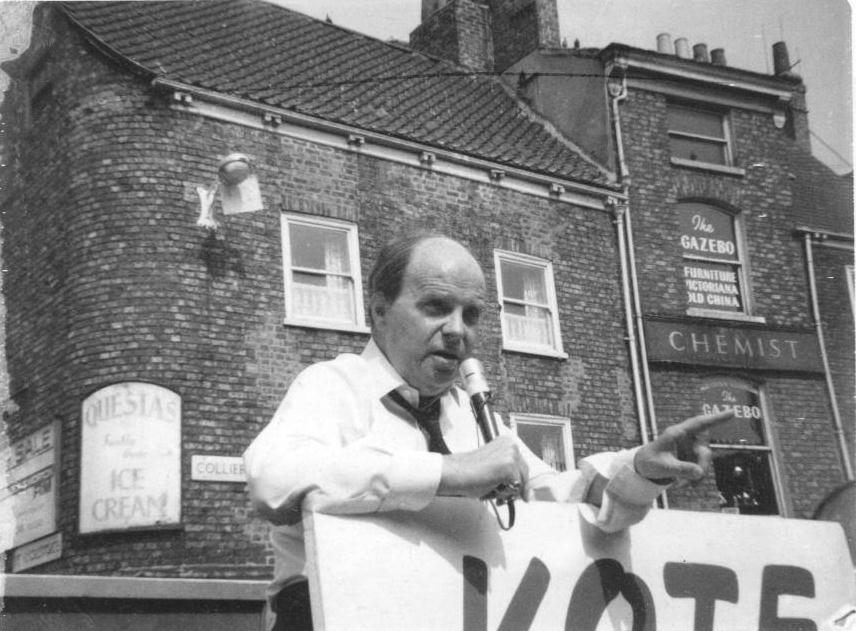
Macleod campaigning in 1970

On 20 June 1970, two days after the Conservative Party's unexpected election victory, Macleod was appointed Chancellor of the Exchequer by the new prime minister, Heath. Despite being in pain, he made his one and only major speech on the economy as chancellor on 7 July 1970. In the speech Macleod bemoaned the high level of inflation and, at the same time, the highest level of unemployment since 1940. Later that day he was rushed to hospital with what was thought at first to be appendicitis, but was in fact a pelvic diverticulum; He was discharged 11 days later. At 10.30 pm on 20 July, while in 11 Downing Street, he suffered a heart attack and died at 11.35 pm.

There seems little doubt that Macleod's wartime injury had combined with his smoking and overwork to shorten his life. Newspaper boss Cecil King wrote in The Cecil King Diary 1970–1974 that Macleod had been stricken during the 1960s by terminal cancer which had begun to affect his spine. However, Macleod's own doctor, a Dr Forster, said there was no evidence that Macleod was suffering from cancer at the time of his death. At the subsequent by-election, Macleod was succeeded by Cecil Parkinson.

Macleod relied on Peter Walker for advice; Walker described him as not "at ease on economics". He planned to hold down nationalised industry prices in an attempt to control inflation. Macleod bequeathed his successors a detailed plan for tax reform, much of which was put into action. He also left behind him an outline budget which some observers found surprisingly hard-line in its proposals for control of public spending. This included the proposal to abolish free school milk in primary schools, which new Education Secretary and future prime minister, Margaret Thatcher was able to partially reverse, reaching the compromise of only applying the cut to older primary school children; even so, she would come to be known as "Margaret Thatcher, Milk Snatcher".

His death was a blow to the Heath government. Robert Carr described him as "our trumpeter … any government needs a great trumpeter." Edmund Dell wrote: "His death was a tragedy for the Conservative Party and possibly for the country. He was a man of considerable intellectual brilliance and one of the finest debaters in the House of Commons. He was the first professional gambler to become Chancellor…" His successor Anthony Barber was much less of a political heavyweight, and Heath was able to dictate economic policy.

His opponent, Roy Jenkins, believed that he would not have been a great chancellor – with youthful memories of the unemployment of the 1930s and adult experience of the lower levels of the postwar era, Macleod thought unemployment higher than 300,000 was too high, and so would have had trouble adjusting to the new economic realities of the 1970s – but still would have been a better chancellor than Barber. He was already ill and old for his years, so would probably not have succeeded Heath as party leader, but might have prevented Thatcher from doing so.

== Oratory, personality and political views ==
Many Conservative politicians of generations following Macleod recalled him as a highly effective speaker. His bald head and piercing gaze gave him a striking physical presence, and he was one of the most powerful platform speakers of his generation, in the league of Churchill or Aneurin Bevan. He was also a superb negotiator with a grasp of detail. Never one to suffer fools, by middle age, his disability made him very short-tempered and impatient with people.

His political opponent Roy Jenkins later wrote that Macleod seemed to prefer to focus his attacks on more moderate Labour figures who might dispute the ownership of the centre ground with him. He wrote that Macleod had "some quality of self-destructiveness in him". He wrote that there was a "calculated coldness" about his partisan attacks. Jenkins wrote that Macleod had "a darting crossword-puzzle mind fortified by a phenomenal memory" adding that "I am not convinced that he was a particularly nice man, but he had insight and insolence". Jenkins likens him to Benjamin Disraeli or to George Canning, who by attracting the admiration of a clique of younger men left a legend out of all proportion to their actual achievements.

He commented about Labour parliamentarians under Hugh Gaitskell (opposition leader 1955–63) that, when offered their choice of weapons, they invariably chose boomerangs. It is said that Macleod was the only Conservative debater whom Harold Wilson, Gaitskell's successor as Labour leader, was afraid of. Wilson declared "they'll never have the sense to choose him [as leader]." He compared Wilson to a kipper, which has two faces. John Major specifically cited Macleod's example on taking office.

Macleod believed that his political views were a mixture of those of his Liberal father and Conservative mother. He almost always called himself a "Tory" rather than a "Conservative". He believed in equality of opportunity rather than of outcome, and wrote that his ideal was "to see that men had an equal chance to make themselves unequal".

He is credited with inventing the term "the nanny state".

== Family ==
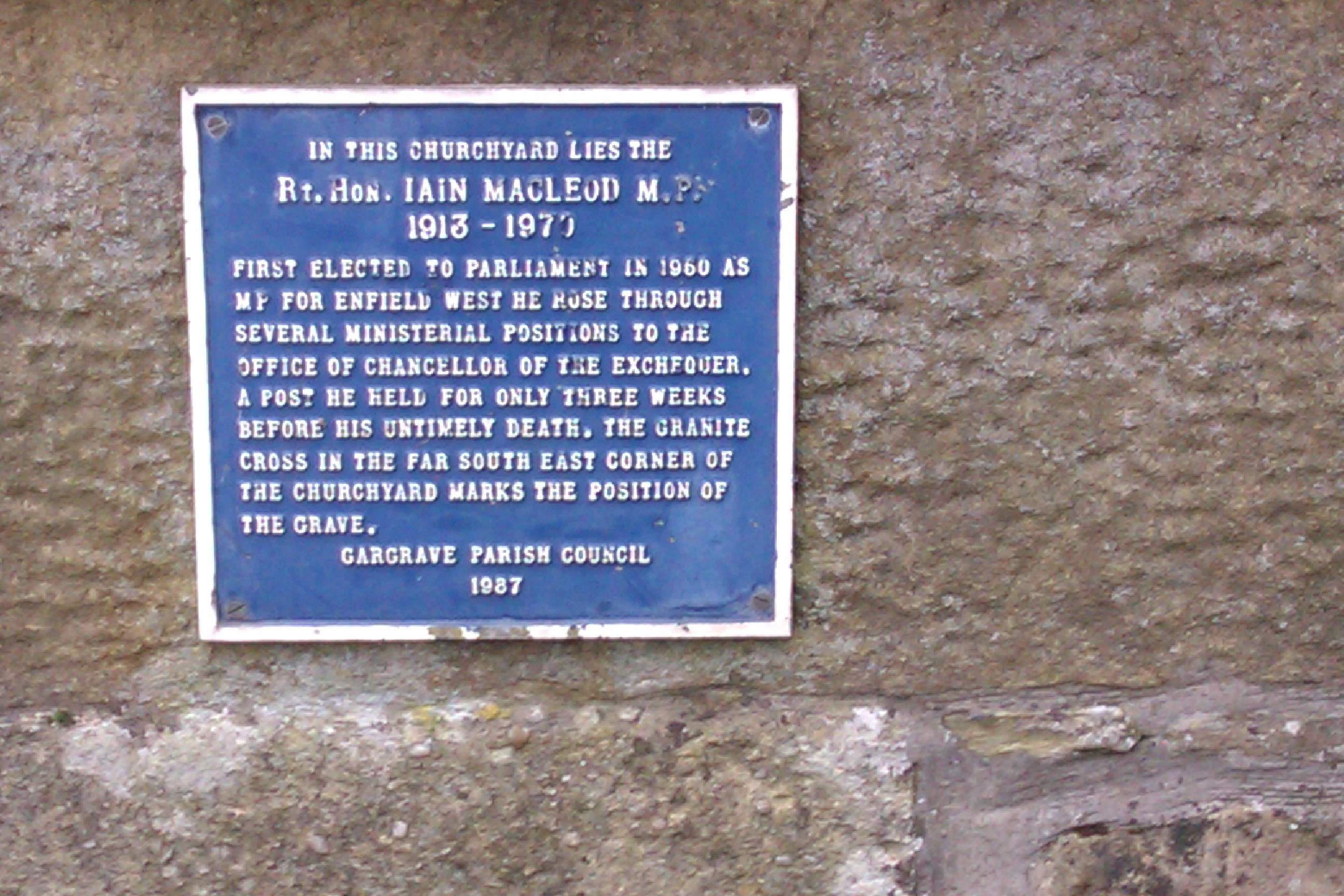
Plaque in Gargrave churchyard

Macleod met Evelyn Hester Mason, née Blois, (1915–1999) in September 1939 whilst he was waiting to be called up for army service and she interviewed him for a job as an ambulance driver. Evelyn was daughter of Rev. Gervase Vanneck Blois, rector of Hanbury, Worcestershire – himself son of Sir John Blois, 8th Baronet- and his wife Hester, whose father was Herbert Pakington, 3rd Baron Hampton. Alan Watkins, in Brief Lives (1982) observed in his portrait of Macleod that he "was always quite proud of his wife's comparatively exalted social connection" After her first husband was killed in the war, they married on 25 January 1941. The Macleods had a son and a daughter, Torquil and Diana, who were born in 1942 and 1944 respectively. They had a somewhat stormy marriage in which they retained a strong bond despite Macleod conducting a number of what his biographer describes as "romances" with other women (he quotes love letters written by Macleod but does not specifically say they went as far as sexual affairs). As was common for MPs' wives of the era, Eve looked after constituency matters whilst her husband concentrated on his career at Westminster.

Evelyn Macleod was struck down in June 1952 with meningitis and polio, but subsequently managed to walk again with the aid of sticks and worked hard to support her husband's career. After her husband's death she accepted a peerage in 1971 and took her seat in the House of Lords as Baroness Macleod of Borve. Macleod's daughter Diana Heimann was a UK Independence Party candidate at Banbury in the 2005 general election.

Macleod is buried in the churchyard of Gargrave Church in North Yorkshire, near his mother who had died seven weeks earlier.

His estate was valued for probate at £18,201 (around £400,000 at 2025 prices).

== Sources ==
- The Macleods – The Genealogy of a Clan, Section Four by Alick Morrison, M.A., by Associated Clan Macleod Societies, Edinburgh, 1974
- The MacLeods – The Genealogy of a Clan, Section Four by The Late Major Loudoun Hector Davenport MacLeod, RM, 1988
- Dell, Edmund (1997). The Chancellors: A History of the Chancellors of the Exchequer, 1945–90. London: HarperCollins. ISBN 978-0-006-38418-2.
- Dutton, David (2001). Neville Chamberlain (Reputations). Hodder Arnold. ISBN 978-0-340-70627-5.
- Goldsworthy, David (2004). "Macleod, Iain Norman". In Matthew, Colin (ed.). Dictionary of National Biography. Vol. 35. Oxford: Oxford University Press. ISBN 978-0198614111.
- Grigg Lloyd George: War Leader (Allen Lane, London, 2002) ISBN 0-7139-9343-X
- Kyle, Keith (2011) [1991]. Suez: Britain's End of Empire in the Middle East. I B Tauris. ISBN 978-1-448-20321-5.
- Jenkins, Roy (2012) [1993]. Portraits and Miniatures. Bloomsbury. ISBN 978-1-848-85533-5.
- Pelling, Henry (1992) [1963]. A History of British Trade Unionism. London: Penguin. ISBN 978-0-14-013640-1.
- Shepherd, Robert (1994). Iain Macleod. Hutchinson. ISBN 978-0-091-78567-3.
- Thorpe, D. R. (2010). Supermac: The Life of Harold Macmillan (Kindle ed.). London: Chatto & Windus. ISBN 978-1844135417.
- Williams, Philip Maynard (1985) [1979]. Hugh Gaitskell. London: Jonathan Cape Ltd. ISBN 978-0-224-01451-9.

Parliament of the United Kingdom
New constituency	Member of Parliament for Enfield West; 1950–1970	Succeeded by Cecil Parkinson
Political offices
Preceded by Harry Crookshank	Minister of Health; 1952–1955	Succeeded by Robin Turton
Preceded by Walter Monckton	Minister of Labour and National Service; 1955–1959	Succeeded by Edward Heath
Preceded by Alan Lennox-Boyd	Secretary of State for the Colonies; 1959–1961	Succeeded by Reginald Maudling
Preceded by Rab Butler	Leader of the House of Commons; 1961–1963	Succeeded by Selwyn Lloyd
Preceded by Charles Hill	Chancellor of the Duchy of Lancaster; 1961–1963	Succeeded by The Lord Blakenham
Preceded by Edward Heath	Shadow Chancellor of the Exchequer; 1965–1970	Succeeded by Roy Jenkins
Preceded by Roy Jenkins	Chancellor of the Exchequer; 1970	Succeeded by Anthony Barber
Party political offices
Preceded by Rab Butler	Chairman of the Conservative Party; 1961–1963; Served alongside: The Lord Poole (1963)	Succeeded by The Lord Blakenham
Media offices
Preceded by Iain Hamilton	Editor of The Spectator; 1963–1965	Succeeded by Nigel Lawson
