= Richmondshire District Council elections =

Local government elections in North Yorkshire, England

Richmondshire District Council was the local authority for Richmondshire in North Yorkshire, England from 1974 to 2023. It was elected every four years. After the last boundary changes in 2003, 34 councillors were elected from 24 wards.

== Political control ==
The first election to the council was held in 1973, initially operating as a shadow authority alongside the outgoing authorities until it came into its powers on 1 April 1974. Political control from 1974 until its abolition in 2023 was as follows:

Party in control	Years
Independent	1974–1999
No overall control	1999–2015
Conservative	2015–2019
No overall control	2019–2023

=== Leadership ===
The leaders of the council from 2001 until the council's abolition in 2023 were:

Councillor	Party	From	To
John Blackie	Independent	2001	2003
John Blackie	Conservative	2003	2007
Melva Steckles	Conservative	2007	2009
Fleur Butler	Conservative	2009	2011
John Blackie	Independent	2011	2015
Yvonne Peacock	Conservative	19 May 2015	May 2019
Angie Dale	Independent	21 May 2019	31 Mar 2023

== Council elections ==
Summary of the council composition after recent council elections, click on the year for full details of each election. Boundary changes took place for the 2003 election.

- 1973 Richmondshire District Council election
- 1976 Richmondshire District Council election
- 1979 Richmondshire District Council election (New ward boundaries)
- 1983 Richmondshire District Council election
- 1987 Richmondshire District Council election

Year	Conservative	Independent	Liberal Democrats	Richmondshire Independent	Social Democrat	Green	Notes
1991	1	30	3	0	0	0	District boundary changes took place but the number of seats remained the same
1995	2	23	8	0	1	0	
1999	6	17	9	0	2	0	
2003	11	9	8	5	1	0	New ward boundaries
2007	13	15	6	0	0	0	
2011	14	16	4	0	0	0	
2015	21	7	2	4	0	0	
2019	10	10	3	0	0	1	New ward boundaries, 10 fewer seats.

== District result maps ==
2003 results map

2007 results map

2011 results map

2015 results map

2019 results map

== By-election results ==
By-elections occur when seats become vacant between council elections. Below is a summary of recent by-elections; full by-election results can be found by clicking on the by-election name.

By-election	Date	Incumbent party	Winning party
Catterick and Tunstall	5 December 1996	Liberal Democrats	Conservative
Hipswell	26 August 1997	Independent	Liberal Democrats
Hipswell	5 March 1998	Independent	Liberal Democrats
Lower Dale	2 April 1998	Independent	Conservative
Aysgarth	3 December 1998	Independent	Independent
Colburn by-election	9 September 1999	Independent	Independent
St Michael with St Luke by-election	22 February 2001	Independent	Independent
Middleham and Coverdale by-election	7 June 2001	Conservative	Conservative
Catterick with Tunstall by-election	30 August 2001	SDP	Liberal Democrats
Leyburn by-election	25 October 2001	Liberal Democrats	Conservative
Gilling West by-election	2 November 2006	Independent	Independent
Newsham with Eppleby	7 August 2008	Conservative	Conservative
Hipswell	15 October 2009	Conservative	Conservative
Middleham	15 October 2009	Conservative	Conservative
Hornby Castle	3 May 2012	Conservative	Conservative
Hornby Castle	12 December 2013	Conservative	Conservative
Reeth and Arkengarthdale	13 February 2014	Independent	Independent
Richmond East	17 September 2015	Conservative	Conservative
Catterick	25 February 2016	Conservative	Conservative
Richmond Central	31 March 2016	Liberal Democrats	Independent
Catterick	18 August 2016	Independent	Conservative
Reeth and Arkengarthdale	18 May 2017	Independent	Conservative
Hawes, High Abbotside and Upper Swaledale	17 October 2019	Independent	Independent

=== 2007-2011 ===
Newsham with Eppleby By-Election 7 August 2008
Party	Candidate	Votes	%	±%
Conservative		295	59.4	
Liberal Democrats		130	26.2	
Independent		72	14.5	
Majority		165	33.2	
Turnout		497	46.8	
Conservative hold		Swing		

Hipswell By-Election 15 October 2009
Party	Candidate	Votes	%	±%
Conservative		144	39.0	+1.2
Liberal Democrats		126	34.1	+8.9
Independent		99	26.8	−10.1
Majority		18	4.9	
Turnout		369	12.5	
Conservative hold		Swing		

Middleham By-Election 15 October 2009
Party	Candidate	Votes	%	±%
Conservative		253	85.5	+10.0
Liberal Democrats		43	14.5	−10.0
Majority		210	71.0	
Turnout		296	27.9	
Conservative hold		Swing		

=== 2011-2015 ===
Retirement of District Councillor Lin Clarkson.

Hornby Castle by-election, 12th December 2013
Party	Candidate	Votes	%	±%
Conservative	Robin Scott	127	46.2	N/A
Independent	Helen Grant	98	35.6	N/A
UKIP	Jacqueline Brakenberry	50	18.2	N/A
Majority		29	9.6	
Turnout		275		
Conservative hold		Swing		

Death of Independent Cllr Bob Gale.

Reeth and Arkengarthdale By-Election, 13th February 2014
Party	Candidate	Votes	%	±%
Independent	Richard Beal	127	46.2	N/A
Conservative	Dave Morton	83	23.3	+11.3
Majority		44	22.9	
Turnout				
Independent hold		Swing		

=== 2015-2019 ===
Death of Independent Cllr Tony Pelton.

Catterick By-Election, 18 August 2016
Party	Candidate	Votes	%	±%
Conservative	Stephen Wyrill	228	41.8	−12.4
Liberal Democrats	John Coates	205	37.2	N/A
Independent	Jill McMullon	112	20.5	−13.1
Green	Robbie Kelly	3	0.5	−11.7
Majority		25	4.6	
Turnout		564	27.95	
Conservative gain from Independent		Swing		

Death of Independent Cllr Richard Beal.

Reeth and Arkengarthdale By-Election, 18 May 2017
Party	Candidate	Votes	%	±%
Conservative	Ian Scott	N/A	N/A	N/A
Conservative gain from Independent		Swing		

=== 2019-2023 ===
Death of Independent Cllr John Blackie.

Hawes, High Abbotside and Upper Swaledale By-Election, 17 October 2019
Party	Candidate	Votes	%	±%
Independent	Jill McMullon	409	58.7	+58.7
Conservative	Pat Kirkbride	231	33.1	+17.8
Green	Margaret Lowndes	57	8.2	+8.2
Majority		178	25.5	
Turnout		697		
Independent hold		Swing		
