= 2011 Richmondshire District Council election =

2011 UK local government election

The 2011 Richmondshire District Council election was held on Thursday 5 May 2011 to elect all 34 members of Richmondshire District Council to a four-year term, the same day as other local elections in the United Kingdom. It was preceded by the 2007 election and followed by the 2015 election. The council remained under no overall control. Turnout across the council was 49.5%.

== Results summary ==
2011 Richmondshire District Council election
Party	Seats	Net gain/loss	Seats %	Votes %	Votes	+/−
Independent	16	▲1	47.1			
Conservative	14	▲1	41.2			
Liberal Democrats	4	▼2	11.8			
Green	0	Steady	0.0			

== Ward results ==
=== Addlebrough ===
Addlebrough (1 seat)
Party	Candidate	Votes	%	±%
Conservative	Yvonne Peacock* (Note: Yvonne Peacock was elected in 2007 as an independent politician, but ran for a reelection as a candidate for the Conservative Party.)	Unopposed		
Registered electors		1,064		
Conservative gain from Independent				

=== Barton ===
Barton (1 seat)
Party	Candidate	Votes	%	±%
Conservative	Campbell Dawson*	345	63.9	▼2.3
Independent	Lorraine Cook	195	36.1	New
Majority		150	27.8	▼4.7
Total valid votes		540	98.9	
Rejected ballots		6	1.1	
Turnout		546	56.5	
Registered electors		966		
Conservative hold		Swing	▼19.2	

=== Bolton Castle ===
Bolton Castle (1 seat)
Party	Candidate	Votes	%	±%
Independent	John Amsden	334	52.6	New
Conservative	David Ashforth	301	47.4	▼52.6
Majority		33	5.2	N/A
Total valid votes		635	98.4	
Rejected ballots		10	1.6	
Turnout		645	61.4	
Registered electors		1,050		
Independent gain from Conservative		Swing	▲52.6	

=== Brompton-on-Swale and Scorton ===
Brompton-on-Swale and Scorton (2 seats)
Party	Candidate	Votes	%	±%
Conservative	Danny Gill	502		
Conservative	Ian Threlfall	408		
Independent	Jim Fryer*	408		
Green	Leslie Rowe	245		
Turnout		1,022	43.6	
Registered electors		2,342		
Conservative hold				
Conservative gain from Independent				

=== Catterick ===
Catterick (2 seats)
Party	Candidate	Votes	%	±%
Independent	Tony Pelton	512		
Conservative	Rob Johnson* (Note: Rob Johnson was elected in 2007 as an independent politician, but ran for reelection as a candidate for the Conservative Party. As such, this seat is marked as a gain for the Conservative Party.)	338		
Conservative	Jane Branch*	263		
Turnout		788	41.6	
Registered electors		1,893		
Independent gain from Conservative				
Conservative gain from Independent				

=== Colburn ===
Colburn (3 seats)
Party	Candidate	Votes	%	±%
Conservative	Bill Glover* (Note: Bill Glover was elected in 2007 as an independent politician, but ran for reelection as a candidate for the Conservative Party.)	426		
Independent	Angie Dale	386		
Independent	Peter Wood*	383		
Independent	Helen Grant*	348		
Conservative	Beverley Partridge	342		
Independent	Mags Burke	157		
Turnout		959	35.8	
Registered electors		2,679		
Conservative gain from Independent				
Independent gain from Independent				
Independent hold				

=== Croft ===
Croft (1 seat)
Party	Candidate	Votes	%	±%
Liberal Democrats	Jane Parlour*	323	57.9	▼42.1
Conservative	Wallace Sayer	235	42.1	New
Majority		88	15.8	N/A
Total valid votes		558	98.4	
Rejected ballots		9	1.6	
Turnout		567	57.3	
Registered electors		989		
Liberal Democrats hold		Swing	▼42.1	

=== Gilling West ===
Gilling West (1 seat)
Party	Candidate	Votes	%	±%
Independent	William Heslop*	280	57.7	▼42.3
Conservative	Peter Todd	205	42.3	New
Majority		75	15.5	N/A
Total valid votes		485	99.6	
Rejected ballots		2	0.4	
Turnout		487	51.5	
Registered electors		945		
Independent hold		Swing	▼42.3	

=== Hawes and High Abbotside ===
Hawes and High Abbotside (1 seat)
Party	Candidate	Votes	%	±%
Independent	John Blackie*	615	94.8	▼5.2
Conservative	Ian Whinray	34	5.2	New
Majority		581	89.5	N/A
Total valid votes		649	99.4	
Rejected ballots		4	0.6	
Turnout		653	61.2	
Registered electors		1,067		
Independent hold		Swing	▼5.2	

=== Hipswell ===
Hipswell (2 seats)
Party	Candidate	Votes	%	±%
Conservative	Stephanie Todd*	226		
Independent	Paul Cullen*	218		
Liberal Democrats	Ann Bagley	140		
Conservative	Christine Wallach	96		
Green	Dave Dalton	80		
Turnout		512	25.3	
Registered electors		2,022		
Conservative hold				
Independent hold				

=== Hornby Castle ===
Hornby Castle (1 seat)
Party	Candidate	Votes	%	±%
Conservative	Melva Steckles*	Unopposed		
Registered electors		1,290		
Conservative hold				

=== Leyburn ===
Leyburn (2 seats)
Party	Candidate	Votes	%	±%
Conservative	Tony Duff*	458		
Conservative	Fleur Butler*	452		
Independent	Andy Brook	425		
Independent	Derek Wallace	284		
Turnout		972	47.0	
Registered electors		2,068		
Conservative hold				
Conservative hold				

=== Lower Wensleydale ===
Lower Wensleydale (1 seat)
Party	Candidate	Votes	%	±%
Conservative	Keith Loadman* (Note: Keith Loadman was elected in 2007 as an independent politician, but ran for reelection as the candidate for the Conservative Party.)	Unopposed		
Registered electors		1,078		
Conservative gain from Independent				

=== Melsonby ===
Melsonby (1 seat)
Party	Candidate	Votes	%	±%
Conservative	Jimmy Wilson-Petch*	300	52.6	▲17.7
Independent	Judith Stansfield	270	47.4	New
Majority		30	5.3	▲4.0
Total valid votes		570	99.7	
Rejected ballots		2	0.3	
Turnout		572	52.2	
Registered electors		1,095		
Conservative hold		Swing	▼14.8	

=== Middleham ===
Middleham (1 seat)
Party	Candidate	Votes	%	±%
Conservative	Rachel Allen	Unopposed		
Registered electors		1,048		
Conservative hold				

=== Middleton Tyas ===
Middleton Tyas (1 seat)
Party	Candidate	Votes	%	±%
Independent	Jill McMullon* (Note: Jill McMullon was elected in 2007 as the candidate for the Conservative Party, but ran for reelection as an independent politician.)	311	62.1	New
Conservative	Peter Staincliffe	190	37.9	▼62.1
Majority		121	24.2	N/A
Total valid votes		501	99.6	
Rejected ballots		2	0.4	
Turnout		503	54.6	
Registered electors		921		
Independent gain from Conservative		Swing	▲62.1	

=== Newsham with Eppleby ===
Newsham with Eppleby (1 seat)
Party	Candidate	Votes	%	±%
Independent	Mick Griffiths	320	55.8	New
Conservative	Judy Lilley	253	44.2	▼55.8
Majority		67	11.7	N/A
Total valid votes		573	99.1	
Rejected ballots		5	0.9	
Turnout		578	56.6	
Registered electors		1,021		
Independent gain from Conservative		Swing	▲55.8	

=== Penhill ===
Penhill (1 seat)
Party	Candidate	Votes	%	±%
Independent	Matthew Wilkes	294	55.4	New
Conservative	Howard Thomas*	237	44.6	▼55.4
Majority		57	10.7	N/A
Total valid votes		531	97.4	
Rejected ballots		14	2.6	
Turnout		545	55.5	
Registered electors		982		
Independent gain from Conservative		Swing	▲55.4	

=== Reeth and Arkengarthdale ===
Reeth and Arkengarthdale (1 seat)
Party	Candidate	Votes	%	±%
Independent	Bob Gale	514	88.0	New
Conservative	Susan Alderson	70	12.0	New
Majority		444	76.0	N/A
Total valid votes		584	98.6	
Rejected ballots		8	1.4	
Turnout		592	57.6	
Registered electors		1,028		
Independent gain from Independent		Swing		

=== Richmond Central ===
Richmond Central (2 seats)
Party	Candidate	Votes	%	±%
Liberal Democrats	Clive World*	428		
Liberal Democrats	John Robinson*	421		
Conservative	Jonathan Fry	399		
Conservative	Jack Simpson	269		
Independent	Amanda Adams	215		
Turnout		974	44.6	
Registered electors		2,186		
Liberal Democrats hold				
Liberal Democrats hold				

=== Richmond East ===
Richmond East (2 seats)
Party	Candidate	Votes	%	±%
Independent	Russell Lord*	531		
Conservative	Muriel Blythman	315		
Conservative	David Morton	312		
Independent	Gill Miller	295		
Liberal Democrats	Samuel Hedges	268		
Liberal Democrats	Michael Irwin	245		
Turnout		1,132	53.6	
Registered electors		2,113		
Independent hold				
Conservative gain from Liberal Democrats				

=== Richmond West ===
Richmond West (2 seats)
Party	Candidate	Votes	%	±%
Independent	Linda Curran* (Note: Linda Curran was elected in 2007 as a candidate for the Liberal Democrats, but ran for reelection as an independent politician.)	698		
Liberal Democrats	Stuart Parsons*	644		
Conservative	Jane Wyrill	166		
Conservative	Wendy Morton	156		
Turnout		1,021	48.9	
Registered electors		2,087		
Independent gain from Liberal Democrats				
Liberal Democrats hold				

=== Scotton ===
Scotton (2 seats)
Party	Candidate	Votes	%	±%
Independent	Mark Bradbury*	287		
Independent	Ken Lambert*	233		
Conservative	Pat Middlemiss	210		
Conservative	Lin Clarkson	198		
Turnout		530	29.1	
Registered electors		1,820		
Independent hold				
Independent hold				

=== Swaledale ===
Swaledale (1 seat)
Party	Candidate	Votes	%	±%
Independent	Malcolm Gardner	277	54.5	New
Conservative	Raymond Alderson* (Note: Raymond Alderson was elected in 2007 as an independent politician, but ran for reelection as the candidate for the Conservative Party.)	231	45.5	▼32.6
Majority		46	9.1	N/A
Total valid votes		508	97.9	
Rejected ballots		11	2.1	
Turnout		519	57.6	
Registered electors		901		
Independent gain from Independent		Swing	▲43.6	
