= Rab Butler =

British politician (1902–1982)

The Right Honourable The Lord Butler of Saffron Walden KG CH PC DL
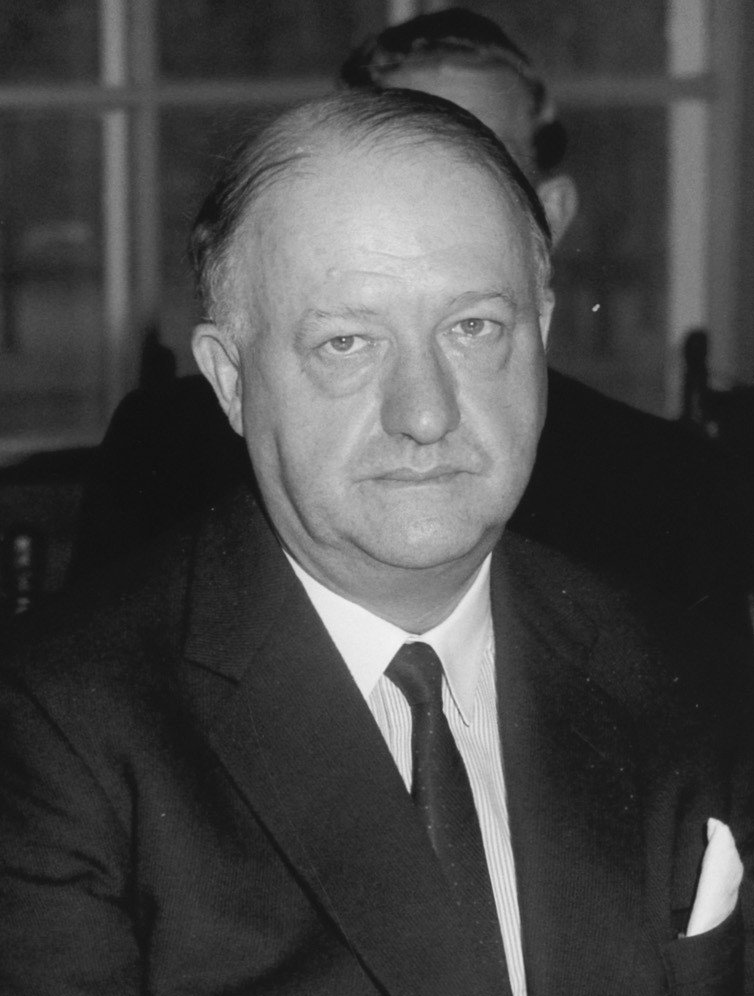
- Butler in 1963

Deputy Prime Minister of the United Kingdom
- De facto 13 July 1962 – 18 October 1963
- Prime Minister: Harold Macmillan
- Preceded by: Anthony Eden (de facto)
- Succeeded by: William Whitelaw (de facto)

First Secretary of State
- In office 13 July 1962 – 18 October 1963
- Prime Minister: Harold Macmillan
- Preceded by: Office established
- Succeeded by: George Brown (1964)
Ministerial offices 1951–1964
Foreign Secretary
In office 20 October 1963 – 16 October 1964
Prime Minister	Alec Douglas-Home
Preceded by	Alec Douglas-Home
Succeeded by	Patrick Gordon-Walker
Home Secretary
In office 14 January 1957 – 13 July 1962
Prime Minister	Harold Macmillan
Preceded by	Gwilym Lloyd George
Succeeded by	Henry Brooke
Chairman of the Conservative Party
In office 14 October 1959 – 9 October 1961
Leader	Harold Macmillan
Preceded by	The Viscount Hailsham
Succeeded by	Iain Macleod
Leader of the House of Commons
In office 20 December 1955 – 9 October 1961
Prime Minister	Anthony Eden; Harold Macmillan
Preceded by	Harry Crookshank
Succeeded by	Iain Macleod
Lord Privy Seal
In office 20 December 1955 – 14 October 1959
Prime Minister	Anthony Eden; Harold Macmillan
Preceded by	Harry Crookshank
Succeeded by	The Viscount Hailsham
Chancellor of the Exchequer
In office 28 October 1951 – 20 December 1955
Prime Minister	Winston Churchill; Anthony Eden
Preceded by	Hugh Gaitskell
Succeeded by	Harold Macmillan
Ministerial offices 1941–1945
Minister of Labour and National Service
In office 25 May 1945 – 26 July 1945
Prime Minister	Winston Churchill
Preceded by	Ernest Bevin
Succeeded by	George Isaacs
Minister of Education (President of the Board, 1941–1944)
In office 20 July 1941 – 25 May 1945
Prime Minister	Winston Churchill
Preceded by	Herwald Ramsbotham
Succeeded by	Richard Law
Shadow offices
Shadow Foreign Secretary
In office 16 October 1964 – 27 July 1965
Leader	Alec Douglas-Home
Shadowing	Patrick Gordon Walker; Michael Stewart
Preceded by	Patrick Gordon-Walker
Succeeded by	Reginald Maudling
Shadow Chancellor of the Exchequer
In office 10 December 1950 – 28 October 1951
Leader	Winston Churchill
Shadowing	Hugh Gaitskell
Preceded by	Oliver Stanley
Succeeded by	Hugh Gaitskell
Parliamentary offices
Member of Parliament for Saffron Walden
In office 30 May 1929 – 19 February 1965
Preceded by	William Mitchell
Succeeded by	Peter Kirk
Member of the House of Lords
Lord Temporal
Life peerage 19 February 1965 – 8 March 1982

Personal details
- Born: Richard Austen Butler; 9 December 1902 Attock Serai, British India (now Attock, Pakistan)
- Died: 8 March 1982 (aged 79) Great Yeldham, Essex, England
- Resting place: St Mary the Virgin, Saffron Walden
- Party: Conservative
- Spouses: Sydney Elizabeth Courtauld (m. 1926; died 1954) Mollie Courtauld (m. 1959)
- Children: 4, including Adam (by Sydney Courtauld)
- Parent: Montagu Sherard Dawes Butler (father)

Academic background
- Education: Pembroke College, Cambridge

Academic work
- Institutions: Pembroke College, Cambridge; Corpus Christi College, Cambridge
- Main interests: Languages; History; International law

Richard Austen Butler, Baron Butler of Saffron Walden (9 December 1902 – 8 March 1982), also known as R. A. Butler and familiarly known from his initials as Rab, was a prominent British Conservative Party politician; he was effectively deputy prime minister to Anthony Eden and Harold Macmillan, although he held the official title for only a brief period in 1962–63. He was one of his party's leaders in promoting the post-war consensus through which the major parties largely agreed on the main points of domestic policy until the 1970s; it is sometimes known as "Butskellism" from a fusion of his name with that of his Labour counterpart, Hugh Gaitskell.

Born into a family of academics and Indian administrators, Butler had a distinguished academic career before he entered Parliament in 1929. As a junior minister, he helped to pass the Government of India Act 1935. He strongly supported the appeasement of Nazi Germany in 1938 to 1939.

Entering the Cabinet in 1941, he served as President of the Board of Education (1941–1945) and oversaw the Education Act 1944. When the Conservatives returned to power in 1951, he served as Chancellor of the Exchequer (1951–1955), Home Secretary (1957–1962), First Secretary of State (1962–1963) and Foreign Secretary (1963–1964). Butler had an exceptionally long ministerial career and was one of only two British politicians (the other being John Simon, 1st Viscount Simon) to have served in three of the four Great Offices of State, but not to have been prime minister for which he was passed over in 1957 and 1963. At the time, the Conservative leadership was decided by a process of private consultation, rather than by a formal vote.

After retiring from politics in 1965, Butler was appointed Master of Trinity College, Cambridge, and served until 1978. He died of colon cancer in 1982.

== Family background ==
Butler's paternal family had a long and distinguished association with the University of Cambridge, dating back to his great-grandfather George Butler. His great-uncle Henry Montagu Butler was Master of Trinity College, Cambridge, and Dean of Gloucester, and his uncle Sir Geoffrey G. Butler, a Cambridge historian and Conservative MP for the university. His father was a Fellow and later Master of Pembroke College, Cambridge.

Butler's maternal grandfather, George Smith, was Principal of Doveton Boys College, Calcutta.

== Early life and education ==
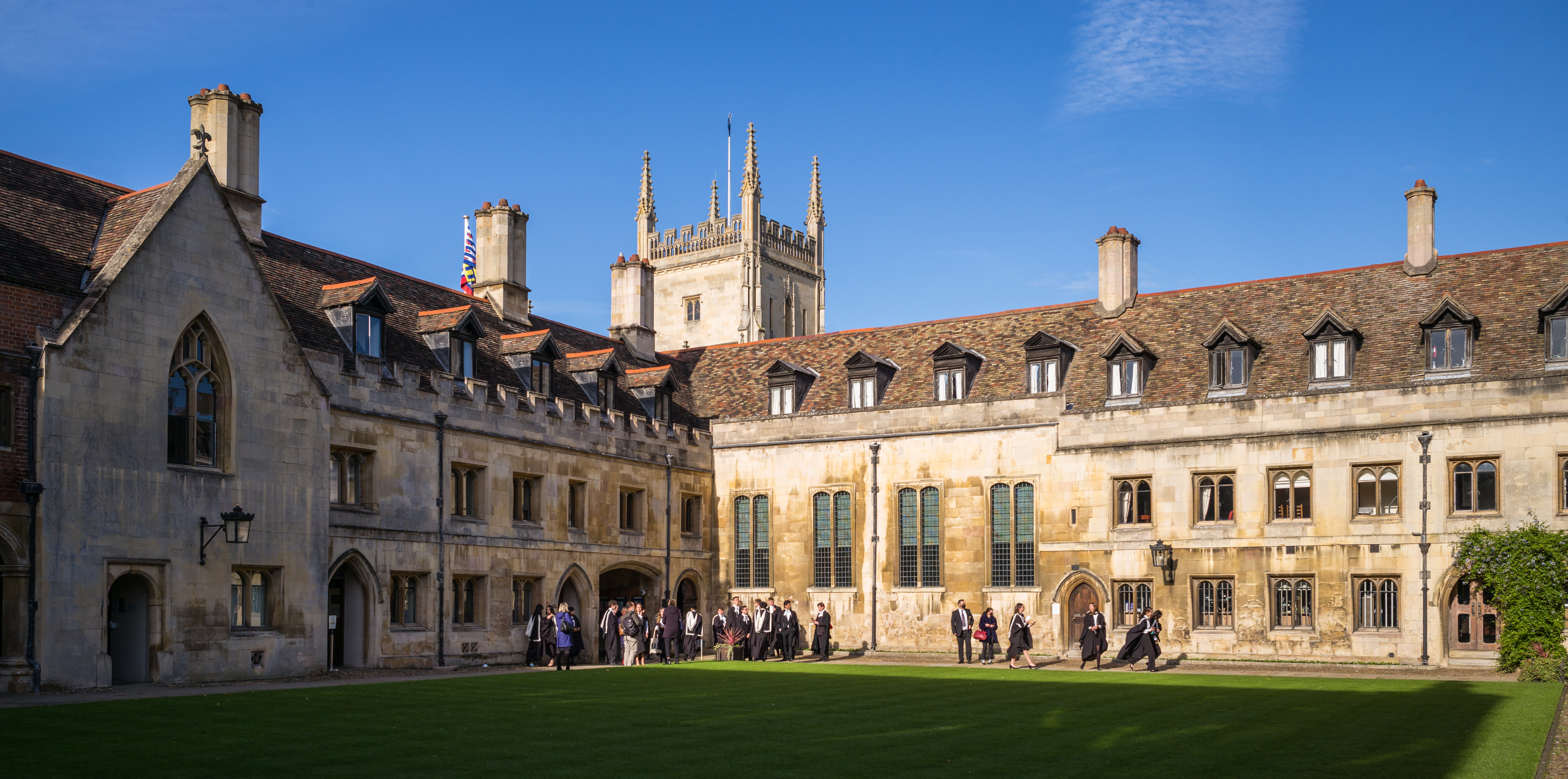
Pembroke College, Cambridge

Richard Austen Butler was born 9 December 1902 in Campbellpore (Attock), British India, the eldest son of Montagu Sherard Dawes Butler, a member of the Indian Civil Service, and Anne Smith. He had two sisters, Iris (1905–2002), who married Lieutenant-Colonel Gervase Portal (1890–1961) and became a writer, and Dorothy (1909–1999), the wife of Laurence Middleton (1905–1982). His younger brother John (1914–1943) was killed in an air crash on active service in January 1943. In July 1909, at the age of six, Butler's right arm was broken in three places in a riding accident, which left his right hand permanently disabled. (Note: Some biographers have suggested "any form of military service (was) out of the question", but Butler joined the Officers' Training Corps and was a competent recreational shot) He attended Brockhurst preparatory school, but rebelled against going to Harrow School, where most of his family were educated. Having failed to win a scholarship to Eton College, he instead attended Marlborough College, leaving in December 1920.

In June 1921, Butler won an exhibition to Pembroke College, Cambridge. At that stage, he planned a career in the Diplomatic Service. He entered Pembroke College in October of that year and became President of the Cambridge Union Society for Easter (summer) term of 1924. Initially studying French and German, he graduated in 1925 with one of the highest first-class degrees in history in the university. He was elected a fellow of Corpus Christi College, Cambridge, and gave lectures on the politics of the French Third Republic. At Cambridge, he met Sydney Courtauld; after they married in 1926, his father-in-law awarded him an income of £5,000 a year after tax for life, which was comparable to a Cabinet Minister's salary and gave him the financial freedom to pursue a political career.

== Early political career ==
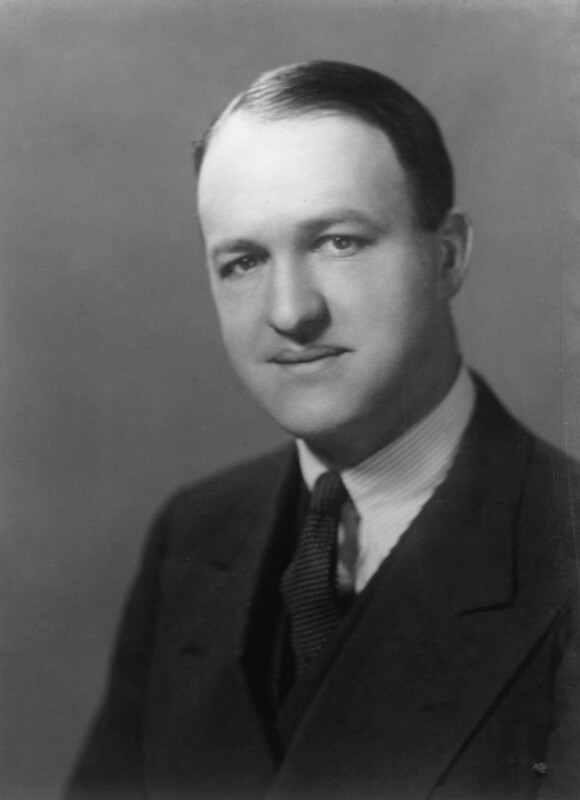
Butler in 1934

With the help of his Courtauld family connections, Butler was selected unopposed as the Conservative candidate for Saffron Walden on 26 November 1927. He was elected in the 1929 general election, and retained the seat until his retirement in 1965.

Even before being elected to Parliament, Butler had been private secretary to Samuel Hoare. When the National Government was formed in August 1931 Hoare was appointed Secretary of State for India, and Butler was appointed as Hoare's Parliamentary Private Secretary (PPS). In January 1932, he visited India as part of Lord Lothian's Franchise Committee, which was set up by the Round Table Conference and which recommended a large increase in the Indian electorate.

On 29 September 1932, Butler became Under-Secretary of State for India after the resignation of Lord Lothian and other Liberals over abandonment of free trade by the National Government. At 29, he was the youngest member of the government and was responsible for piloting the Government of India Act 1935 through Parliament in the face of massive opposition from Winston Churchill and the Conservative right. He retained this position in Stanley Baldwin's third government (1935–1937), and when Neville Chamberlain replaced Baldwin as prime minister in May 1937, Butler was appointed Parliamentary Secretary at the Ministry of Labour.

== Foreign Office: 1938 to 1941 ==
In the reshuffle caused by the resignation of Anthony Eden as Foreign Secretary and Lord Cranborne as Under-Secretary of State for Foreign Affairs in February 1938, they were replaced by Lord Halifax and Butler, who became the main Foreign Office spokesman in the Commons.

In internal discussions after Germany's annexation of Austria on 12 March 1938, Butler counselled against giving Czechoslovakia a guarantee of British support and approved the Cabinet decision on 22 March not to do so, facts that he later omitted from his memoirs. During the Sudeten Crisis, he was attending a League of Nations meeting in Geneva but strongly supported Chamberlain's trip to Berchtesgaden on 16 September, even if it meant sacrificing Czechoslovakia in the interests of peace. Butler returned to Britain to make the winding-up speech for the Government in the Parliamentary Debate on the Munich Agreement on 5 October. After Churchill had spoken, Butler said that war solved nothing and that it was better to "settle our differences with Germany by consultation". However, he did not directly defend the Munich settlement; the motion was to support the avoidance of war and the pursuit of lasting peace.

Butler became a Privy Counsellor in the 1939 New Year Honours list, the youngest person so appointed since Churchill in 1907.

=== After Prague ===
After the German occupation of Czechoslovakia on 15 March 1939, Butler, like Chamberlain, was shocked at Hitler's duplicity in breaking the Munich Agreement. The evidence suggests Butler did not support Halifax's new policy of attempting to deter further German aggression by pledging to go to war to defend Poland and other Eastern European countries.

Butler became a member of the foreign policy committee, which agreed to seek an Anglo-Soviet alliance in May 1939, contrary to Chamberlain's and Butler's wishes, but Butler and Horace Wilson persuaded Chamberlain to hamstring the search for an agreement by including a requirement that Britain would not fight without League of Nations approval. Throughout the summer of 1939 Butler continued to lobby for closer Anglo-German relations and for Britain to lean on Poland to reach agreement with Germany.

After the Molotov–Ribbentrop Pact was announced on 23 August 1939, Butler vainly advised against honouring Britain's guarantee to defend Poland against Germany but instead favoured Hitler's proposal to allow Germany to settle matters with Poland as it wished and, in return for concessions over her former colonies, to sign an Anglo-German alliance. Oliver Harvey recorded (27 August) that Butler and Horace Wilson were "working like beavers" for "another Munich".

As late as early September 1939, with German invasion of Poland imminent, comments in Channon's diary suggest that Butler was sympathetic to last-minute Italian efforts to broker peace and that he and Butler were heartened by the delay in the British declaration of war on Germany caused by lack of agreement with the French over timing.

=== Foreign Office Minister: later views and Butler's memoirs ===
Butler's close association with appeasement was often held against him later in his career. Although he later held many senior Cabinet positions, by the time of Suez in 1956, his past, coupled with his lack of personal military experience, damaged his reputation in the eyes of the younger generation of Conservative MPs, many of whom were Second World War veterans. At the time, Butler strongly supported reaching agreement with Hitler as necessary for peace, but in his memoirs, The Art of the Possible (1971), he defended the Munich Agreement as essential to buy time to rearm and gain public support for war in Britain and the Dominions, and he also claimed that he had little input into foreign policy.

Later commentators argue that Butler's suggestion in his memoirs that he supported Halifax in leading the drive away from appeasement after Prague is "wholly false". His own papers suggest that he went to "greater lengths to meet Hitler's demands than any other figure in the British government" in 1939. His efforts to revoke the Polish guarantee that summer went beyond even Horace Wilson's, and it seems doubtful whether he was willing to fight Hitler over Poland at all. Patrick Cosgrave argues, "Butler did not merely go along with appeasement he waxed hard, long and enthusiastic for it, and there is very little evidence... he took the slightest interest in the rearmament programme to which he devotes such emphasis in his memoirs". Andrew Roberts says that "it is hard to see Butler as a sympathetic figure in the 1930s. He took to appeasement with an unholy glee not shared after Anschluss by anyone else in his party, his relish for back-room deals and his almost messianic opposition to Churchill make Butler.... seem a thoroughly unattractive figure".

Jago concludes that Butler "distorted the facts" and "grossly misrepresented his responsibility and attitudes in 1938". Although not the direct cause of his defeats [for the party leadership] in 1957 or 1963 "it was... always there, the blemish that he could not quite reason away".

=== Phoney War ===
On 20 October 1939, after the Fall of Poland, Butler was, according to Soviet Ambassador Ivan Maisky, still open to a compromise peace and agreement to restore Germany's colonies if it was guaranteed by all the powers, including the Americans and the Soviets. He dismissed as an "absurdity" any suggestion for Germany first to be required to withdraw from Poland. Butler disapproved of Churchill, the new First Lord of the Admiralty who publicly opposed to any hint of compromise peace.

Butler was quicker than many to realise the social change which war would bring. He spoke to Robert Barrington-Ward of The Times (12 February 1940) of "the new social revolution that is making its way, and how to anticipate and meet it".

With Chamberlain's position untenable after the Norway Debate, Butler tried on 10 May 1940 to persuade Halifax to accept appointment as prime minister, but he later stated that he was out at the dentist, and Churchill was appointed instead. Butler wrote to Chamberlain on 11 May to urge him to carry on as a member of the government in the hope of achieving a negotiated peace and was reappointed to the Foreign Office on 15 May. Butler later grew to respect Churchill after serving under him.

=== Under Churchill and Prytz Affair ===
On 17 June 1940, the day that Marshal Philippe Pétain asked for an armistice, Butler met informally with a Swedish envoy, Björn Prytz. Prytz later reported to Stockholm that Butler had declared British policy must be determined by "common sense not bravado" and that had "assured me that no opportunity for reaching a compromise (peace) would be neglected" if there were reasonable conditions.

Churchill was furious when he found out, probably through intelligence intercepts of Swedish diplomatic cables. He wrote to Halifax on 26 June complaining of Butler's "odd language", which hinted at a lukewarm or even defeatist attitude. Butler, who was lucky not to be sacked, made a four-page handwritten reply the same day that claimed that he had kept to the official British line and had said "nothing definite or specific that I would wish to withdraw", but he offered to resign. On 28 June, after being shown Churchill's letter, Butler wrote to Halifax and gave an unconvincing explanation, which he later repeated in his memoirs, that by "common sense not bravado", he had been pushing the official line that there could be no peace until Germany had disgorged its conquests. Jago argues that Butler may have been covering for Halifax. Halifax's biographer Andrew Roberts believes that Butler had been putting words into the mouth of Halifax, who had already moved away from his earlier openness to a compromise peace.

Butler kept his position and was allowed to make two broadcasts on the BBC (21 October and 15 December 1940). At the reshuffle on Chamberlain's resignation from the government (22 October 1940), Churchill's close supporter Brendan Bracken offered Butler promotion to the Cabinet-level job of President of the Board of Education, but no offer was forthcoming from Churchill.

Butler had little respect for Eden but reluctantly agreed to remain at the Foreign Office when he once again became Foreign Secretary in December 1940. In March 1941, with Eden in Cairo, Churchill handled Foreign Office business personally instead of delegating it to Butler. By then, Butler's responsibilities had been restricted to "routine drudgery" such as negotiating safe passage for diplomats; repatriation of neutral seamen; and, on one occasion, arranging extra clothing coupons for foreign diplomats so that the Duke of Alba could buy more socks. Butler and Geoffrey Lloyd attempted to register for military service in May 1941, but their application was referred to Ernest Bevin (Minister of Labour), who, in turn, referred it to Churchill. He vetoed it on the grounds that their work as government ministers was more important.

== Education minister ==
Butler gained permanent fame for the Education Act 1944. Butler's decisive role was to secure passage by negotiations with interested parties from Churchill to the churches and from educators to MPs.

=== Background ===
In July 1941, Butler was appointed President of the Board of Education, his first Cabinet post. Some writers, such as Addison, suggest that Education was a backwater and that Churchill offered him it or a diplomatic post to remove him from the more sensitive Foreign Office. However, he had been keen to leave the Foreign Office. Michael Jago argues that the promotion was not, contrary to Butler's own later insinuations, intended as an insult.

Butler proved to be one of the most radical reforming ministers on the home front. The main problem standing in the way of education reform was the question of integrating church schools into the state system, which had bedevilled Balfour's Education Act 1902. Churchill did not want a new bill and replied that "we cannot have party politics in wartime". Churchill warned him not to "raise the 1902 controversy during the war". Butler later wrote that having seen the Promised Land, "I was damned if I was going to die in the Land of Moab. Basing myself on long experience of Churchill over the India Bill, I decided to disregard what he said and go straight ahead".

=== Negotiation with the churches ===
More than half the schools in the country were church schools. Many church schools were in a poor state of repair. In a meeting on 5 June 1942 with the National Society, the body of Church of England schools, Butler proposed that Church schools could choose either to be 50% aided or fully funded with a local education authority majority on the school governing body. Archbishop Temple agreed to persuade his flock to accept the deal and later obtained the concession that denominational teachers could be allowed in fully-controlled schools if parents so wished. In early October 1942, Butler sold his scheme to the Nonconformist leaders of England and Wales.

Butler had less success in his dealings with the Roman Catholic Church. He was not able to have talks with the elderly Cardinal Arthur Hinsley until September 1942. Butler was told that his plans for 50% aided status were not acceptable to the Roman Catholic Church on 15 September 1942. Butler thought it better to present the Catholic Church with a fait accompli. Plans for 1943 were scuppered by a letter to The Times from Hinsley stressing Franklin Roosevelt's commitment to freedom of conscience and arguing that Catholic schools should not be bullied by the state, as they often provided for the poorest inner-city communities.

Serious thought was given to integrating public (fee-paying) schools into the state system. Butler was supportive and believed that standards would be raised in state schools if affluent and articulate parents were involved in the system. The Fleming Commission, assembled by Butler, recommended in July 1944 for a quarter of public school places to be given to scholarships. However, nothing came of it, not least as the idea of spending ratepayers' money on a few bright pupils often did not meet with local authority approval.

=== 1942–1945 ===
With Churchill's leadership being questioned after recent reverses in the Far East and North Africa, Ivor Bulmer-Thomas (14 August 1942) commented that some Conservative MPs saw Butler, rather than Eden, as a potential successor. In late November 1942, Butler toyed with the idea of allowing himself to be considered for the job of Viceroy of India (in succession to Lord Linlithgow). Eden had been offered the position by Churchill and was seriously considering accepting it. In the end, Field Marshal Wavell was appointed. Butler helped to write King George VI's Christmas broadcast at the end of 1942.

Butler lobbied John Anderson, Kingsley Wood and Ernest Bevin for an education bill in 1943, and by the end of 1942, a draft white paper was proceeding through the Lord President's Committee. By March 1943, with an Allied victory seeming only a matter of time, Churchill began to support an education bill in 1944 and was aware that he needed to promise postwar improvements and that reforming schools would be cheaper than implementing the Beveridge Report. When the white paper was published on 16 July 1943, church-state relations received the least attention.

The resulting bill became the Education Act 1944 and is often known as the "Butler Act". It brought in free secondary education; until then, many grammar schools charged for entry, albeit with local authority assistance for poorer pupils in recent years. The act expanded nursery provision and raised the school leaving age to 15, with a commitment to raise it further to 16 (not implemented until 1972).

At the second reading in March 1944, Thelma Cazalet-Keir, part of Quintin Hogg's Tory Reform Committee, proposed two amendments, one to raise the school leaving age to 16 by 1951 and another demanding equal pay for women teachers. The latter passed by one vote on 28 March 1944. This was the only time the Coalition suffered a significant defeat in a division. Churchill made the amendment a matter of confidence and ensured its defeat on 30 March. This was one of the events which made Churchill and the Conservatives appear reactionary and contributed to their election defeat in 1945. The Butler Act became law in August 1944.

With party politics restarting, Butler opposed the nationalisation of iron and steel on 9 April 1945. After the end of the European War in May, Butler was Minister of Labour for two months in the Churchill caretaker ministry. In the Labour landslide of July 1945 he held Saffron Walden narrowly, his majority falling to 1,158. He would probably not have held the seat if the Liberal candidate had not polled over 3,000 votes and split the opposition vote.

== In opposition ==
After the Conservatives were defeated in the 1945 general election, Butler emerged as the most prominent figure in the rebuilding of the party. He became Chairman of the Conservative Research Department, assisted by David Clarke and Michael Fraser. In 1946, he became chairman of the Industrial Policy Committee. In 1947, the Industrial Charter was produced, which advocated full employment and acceptance of the welfare state.

In March 1949, the Rt. Hon. R.A.Butler, MA, FRGS, MP gave The Clayton Memorial Lecture to the Manchester Literary and Philosophical Society on the subject of The Modern Trends in Education

== Chancellor of the Exchequer ==
When the Conservative Party returned to power in 1951, Butler was appointed Chancellor of the Exchequer in the absence of other candidates, Oliver Lyttelton being seen as too close to the City of London. He inherited a balance of payments crisis that was partially caused by the increase in defence spending as a result of the Korean War. Butler initially planned to let the pound float (which would in practice devalue it) and become partially convertible ("Operation ROBOT"). The latter was struck down by Lord Cherwell and his adviser Donald MacDougall, who prepared a paper for Churchill. The counterargument was that the balance of payments would have worsened, as any reduction in demand for imports would have been swamped by the rise in prices of imported goods. Furthermore, 90% of other countries' sterling balances, kept in London, were to be frozen. They too would effectively have been devalued, which would have angered Commonwealth countries, would have broken the rules for the International Monetary Fund and would not have been allowed under the new European Payments Union. He was also opposed by his junior minister, Arthur Salter, while Lord Woolton insisted Eden should be involved since the policy would affect foreign relations. Eden opposed it in a rare intervention in domestic politics. It was finally buried at two Cabinets, on 28 and 29 February 1952.

Butler followed to a large extent the economic policies of his Labour predecessor, Hugh Gaitskell, by pursuing a mixed economy and Keynesian economics as part of the post-war political consensus. The name "Butskellism", referring to the generally similar economic policies pursued by both Conservative and Labour governments, was coined partly in response to Butler's extension of Gaitskell's NHS charges in 1952, the issue over which Aneurin Bevan and other Labour left-wingers had resigned in April 1951. In 1954, The Economist published an editorial headed "Mr Butskell's Dilemma", which referred to the "already... well-known figure" Mr Butskell as "a composite of the present Chancellor and the previous one". However, Butler had more interest in monetary policy and in convertibility, whereas Gaitskell was more inclined to exchange controls, investment and planning.

Butler maintained import controls and began a more active monetary policy. In the March 1952 budget, he raised the official bank rate to 4%, cut food subsidies by 40%, reduced taxes and increased pensions and welfare payments, the cumulative effect being to increase foreign exchange reserves but depress domestic demand. His 1953 budget cut income tax and purchase tax and promised an end to the excess profits levy. When Churchill suffered a stroke in the summer of 1953, an illness that was concealed from the public, Butler acted as head of the Government since Churchill's presumed successor, Eden, was in the United States having medical treatment. Between 29 June and 18 August 1953, Butler chaired sixteen Cabinet meetings. In July, Macmillan recorded a conversation with Walter Monckton, who was willing to serve under Eden but not Butler, whom he considered "a slab of cold fish".

Britain's economic problems were worsened by Monckton's appeasement of the trade unions (the 1954 rail strike was settled on the union's terms with Churchill's backing) and by Macmillan's drive to build 300,000 houses a year.

Butler was appointed to the Order of the Companions of Honour in 1954. He supported Churchill's proposal for Eden to take "command of the Home Front" in summer 1954, not least as he hoped to succeed Eden as foreign secretary. Butler was one of the ministers who demanded to Churchill's face (22 December 1954) that he set a date for his retirement.

== Under Eden ==
=== Move from the Exchequer ===
Butler's political judgement was affected by the death of his first wife, Sydney, on 9 December 1954. In February 1955, he increased the bank rate and restored hire purchase restrictions, and the 1955 budget reduced income tax by 6d, which was allegedly based on faulty Treasury statistics. In April, Anthony Eden succeeded Churchill as prime minister. After the Conservatives won the May 1955 general election, Butler declined a request he move from the Exchequer and later admitted that was a mistake. In an unfortunate speech on 18 October, he commented that the country must not sink into "easy evenings with port wine and over-ripe pheasant". The Daily Mirror commented that he had "dropped his silver spoon upon the polished floor". By now, it was apparent that the economy was "overheating" since inflation and the balance of payments deficit were rising sharply. The Cabinet refused to agree to cut bread subsidies, and there was a run on the pound. His final budget in October 1955 reversed several of the measures from the spring budget, which led to charges of electoral opportunism. Hugh Gaitskell accused him of having deliberately misled the electorate, which amused Macmillan, who wrote in his diary of how Butler was always talking of "honour" in Cabinet. The introduction of purchase tax on kitchen utensils caused it to be labelled the "Pots and Pans" budget. Macmillan was already negotiating with Eden for Butler's job.

In December 1955, Butler was moved to the post of Lord Privy Seal and Leader of the House of Commons. Although he continued to act as a deputy for Eden on a number of occasions, he was not officially recognised as such, and his successor as chancellor, Harold Macmillan, insisted on an assurance from Eden that Butler was not senior to him. Harry Crookshank warned that he was committing "political suicide" by giving up a big department. He recorded that after December 1955 that "it was never again said of me, or for that matter of the British economy either, that we had la puissance d'une idée en marche". (Note: A perception the British economy was falling behind other European countries, the so-called "British disease", began in the late 1950s when West Germany's GDP overtook Britain's.)

Butler suffered from what his biographer calls an "inability to take Eden wholly seriously". A number of his sardonic witticisms about Eden, who was already subject to press criticism, surfaced, and The Sunday People reported on 8 January 1956 that Eden was to resign and hand over the premiership to Butler. When it was officially denied, on 9 January, Butler told The Guardian that he was determined to "support the Prime Minister in all his difficulties" and that Eden was "the best Prime Minister we have".

Butler threatened resignation in March 1956 over Macmillan's plans to reverse the 6d cut in income tax. Macmillan himself then threatened resignation unless he was allowed to make spending cuts instead. Butler also served as Rector of the University of Glasgow from 1956 to 1959.

=== Suez ===
Butler was ill when Gamal Abdel Nasser nationalised the Suez Canal and was not formally a member of the Cabinet Egypt Committee. Butler later claimed that he had tried to keep Eden "in a political straitjacket" and advocated an open invasion of Egypt. Gilmour wrote that this would have attracted even more international opprobrium than Eden's pretence of enforcing international law.

Butler seemed to be doubtful of Eden's Suez policy but never said so openly. Macmillan recorded on 24 August that Butler was "uncertain" and "wanted more time" before resorting to force. On 13 September, he recorded that Butler preferred to refer the matter to the UN, as Labour and the churches wanted. After the UN voted for an emergency force and an Israeli-Egyptian ceasefire seemed imminent, Butler tried to have the Anglo-French invasion halted. He ended up pleasing neither those who were opposed to the invasion nor those who supported it. (Note: "Butler's... indiscretions... gave the impression that he was not playing the game. Others were playing a deeper one". Gilmour refers here to Macmillan, who had initially supported the invasion but was now intriguing to become Prime Minister.)

On the evening of 6 November 1956, after the British ceasefire had been announced, Butler was observed to be "smiling broadly" on the front bench and astonished some Conservatives by saying that he "would not hesitate to convey" to the absent prime minister the concerns expressed by Gaitskell. Eden's press secretary, William Clark, an opponent of the policy, complained, "God how power corrupts. The way RAB has turned and trimmed". He later resigned, along with Edward Boyle (Economic Secretary to the Treasury), as soon as the fighting was over. Butler was seen as disloyal because he aired his doubts freely in private while he was supporting the government in public, and he later admitted that he should have resigned. On 14 November, Butler blurted out all that had happened to 20 Conservative MPs of the Progress Trust in a Commons Dining Room (his speech was described by Gilmour as "almost suicidally imprudent").

Butler had to announce British withdrawal from the Canal Zone (22 November), which made him once again appear an "appeaser" to Conservative supporters up and down the country. That evening, Butler addressed the 1922 Committee of Conservative backbenchers, where his pedestrian defence of government policy was upstaged by a speech by Macmillan.

Butler was seen to be an indecisive leader who was not up to Macmillan's stature. However, the Press Association were briefed that Rab was "in effective charge" during Eden's absence in Jamaica from 23 November. Eden was not in telephone contact and did not return to Britain until 14 December.

Shadow Chancellor Harold Wilson said that Butler had "the look of a born loser" (20 December). Butler spent most of his Christmas break shooting. He later recorded that during his period as acting Head of Government at Number 10, he had noticed constant comings and goings of ministers to Macmillan's study in Number 11, next door, and that those who attended all later received promotion when Macmillan became prime minister. Butler, unlike Macmillan, preferred the assessments of the Chief Whip (Edward Heath) and Chairman of the Party (Oliver Poole), who believed that Eden could survive as prime minister until the summer recess if his health held up.

However, there is circumstantial evidence that Butler may have colluded with Eden's doctor, Sir Horace Evans, to exaggerate the state of Eden's health to encourage him to resign. Evans wrote Butler an ambiguous letter about "your help and guidance over my difficult problems with AE" and added, "Here we have made, I have no doubt, the right decision". Anthony Howard observes that any interpretation of the letter is "purely speculative" and that there is "no concrete evidence" of what actually occurred.

=== Succession to Eden ===
Eden resigned as prime minister on Wednesday 9 January 1957. At the time, the Conservative Party had no formal mechanism for determining a new leader, but Queen Elizabeth II received overwhelming advice to appoint Macmillan as prime minister instead of Butler, rather than wait for a party meeting to decide. Churchill had reservations about both candidates but later admitted that he had advised her to appoint "the older man", Macmillan. In the presence of Lord Chancellor Kilmuir, Lord Salisbury interviewed the Cabinet one by one and with his famous speech impediment asked each one whether he was for "Wab or Hawold". Kilmuir recalled that three ministers were for Butler: Walter Monckton, Patrick Buchan-Hepburn and James Stuart, all of whom left the government thereafter. Salisbury himself later recorded that all of the Cabinet were for Macmillan except for Patrick Buchan-Hepburn, who was for Butler, and Selwyn Lloyd, who abstained.

Admittedly, Salisbury may not have been an entirely impartial returning officer, as Butler had replaced Salisbury (Lord Cranborne as he had been at the time) as Under-Secretary for Foreign Affairs in 1938, who when the latter had resigned over policy towards Italy. Julian Amery, who was not a member of the Cabinet at the time, alleged that Salisbury interviewed ministers in the order of their loyalty to Macmillan and kept the tally in plain view on the table so that waverers would be more inclined to plump for the winning candidate.

Heath (Chief Whip) and John Morrison (Chairman of the 1922 Committee) both advised that the Suez group of right-wing Conservative backbenchers would be reluctant to follow Rab. The whips rang Boothby (pro-Macmillan) in Strasbourg to obtain his views, but there is no evidence that they were very assiduous in canvassing known pro-Butler MPs.

Butler later claimed to have been "not surprised" not to be chosen in 1957. In fact, he appears to have fully expected to be appointed and aroused his sister's misgivings by asking, "What shall I say in my broadcast to the nation tomorrow?" Heath, who brought him the news that he had not been chosen, later wrote that Butler appeared "utterly dumbfounded" and that for years afterwards, he was known to ask colleagues why he had been passed over. According to Heath, Butler suffered thereafter from a lack of confidence, and this prevented him from gaining the Prime Ministry in 1963. The media were taken by surprise by the choice, but Butler confessed in his memoirs that whilst there was a sizeable anti-Butler faction on the backbenches, there was no such anti-Macmillan faction. Butler spoke bitterly the next day about "our beloved Monarch".

Later, Butler attributed his defeat to Macmillan's "ambience" and "connections". He said "savage" things to Derek Marks of the Daily Express, who protected Butler's reputation by not printing them; years later Marks told Sir Alistair Horne, Macmillan's biographer, that Butler simply "could not understand" why he had been passed over after "picking up the pieces" after Suez. Nigel Nicolson, who had conceded that "in the circumstances", Macmillan was the right choice, wrote of the "melancholy that right had not triumphed" with which Butler proposed Macmillan as leader at the party meeting on 22 January.

In Gilmour's view, Butler did not organise a leadership campaign in 1957 because he had expected Eden to hang on until Easter or summer. Campbell wrote, "The succession was sewn up before Rab even realised there was a contest". Labour's Richard Crossman wrote in his diary (11 January), "This whole operation has been conducted from the top by a very few people with great speed and skill, so that Butler was outflanked and compelled to surrender almost as quickly as the Egyptians at Sinai". Brendan Bracken wrote that besides Butler's record of pursuing policies similar to Labour's, the "audience (was) tired of" Butler and that he had been the heir-apparent for too long. This interpretation of Bracken's has since been echoed by Campbell, who likens Macmillan's sudden emergence after a quick succession of senior jobs to that of John Major in 1989–1990. Campbell points out that like Major, Macmillan pretended to be "right-wing" to win the leadership despite having views similar to his opponent's.

== Under Macmillan ==
=== Home Office ===
Butler had to accept the Home Office under Macmillan, not the Foreign Office, which he wanted. In his memoirs, Macmillan claimed that Butler "chose" the Home Office, an assertion of which Butler drily observed in his own memoirs that Macmillan's memory "played him false". Heath corroborates Butler's claim that he had wanted the Foreign Office and suggested that with his "quiet charm", he could have won over the Americans. Butler also remained Leader of the House of Commons.

In early 1958, he was left "holding the baby", as he put it, after Macmillan had departed on a Commonwealth tour after the resignation of Chancellor Thorneycroft and the Treasury team.

Butler held the Home Office for five years, but his liberal views on hanging and flogging did little to endear him to rank-and-file Conservative members. He later wrote of "Colonel Blimps of both sexes – and the female of the species was more deadly, politically, than the male". Butler later wrote that Macmillan, who kept a tight grip on foreign and economic policies, had given him "a completely free hand" in Home Office matters, which may well have been, in Gilmour's view, because reform was likely to blacken Butler in the eyes of Conservative activists. Macmillan's official biographer believes that Butler simply had no interest in home affairs. Butler later said, "I couldn't deal with Eden, but I could deal with Mac".

Butler inherited a Homicide Bill, which introduced different degrees of murder. He had privately come to favour abolition of hanging but signed off on the execution of James Hanratty, which was thought at the time to be a miscarriage of justice. He declined to reintroduce corporal punishment, according to the recommendation of the prewar Cadogan Report.

Butler gave a very successful speech at the Conservative Conference in 1959. Despite the recommendations of the Wolfenden Report, he could not decriminalise homosexual acts between consenting adults (that would not happen until 1967), but the Conservatives were more willing to implement Wolfenden's recommended crackdown on street prostitution. He passed the Licensing Act 1961 and reformed the law on obscene publications. The Betting and Gaming Act legalised betting.

Annual immigration from the Indian subcontinent had risen from 21,000 in 1959 to 136,000 in 1961. Butler introduced the first curbs on immigration although the Eden Cabinet had contemplated measures in 1955. It was initially opposed by Labour, but the party brought in stricter curbs when it returned to office.

Enoch Powell praised Butler's performance as a great reforming Home Secretary. He recalled that if Butler was absent from his post as Chairman of the Cabinet Home Affairs Committee, it was if the government itself "came to a standstill".

=== Other Cabinet positions ===
Besides the Home Office, Butler held other senior government jobs in these years. He likened himself to the Gilbert and Sullivan character "Pooh Bah". In October 1959, after that year's general election, he was appointed Chairman of the Conservative Party, which required him to attack Labour in the country, but as Leader of the House, he had to co-operate with Labour in the Commons. His new position prompted an analogy, described as "ludicrous" by Anthony Howard, in The Economist with Nikita Khrushchev's rise to power through control of the Soviet Communist Party.

In 1960, Macmillan moved Selwyn Lloyd from the Foreign Office to the Exchequer by telling him that it would put him in a good position to challenge Butler for the succession. He appointed Lord Home as Foreign Secretary, refused again to appoint Butler and told him that it would be "like Herbert Morrison" if he took the position. That was "fantastically insulting" in Campbell's view, as Morrison was then regarded as "the worst Foreign Secretary in living memory". Butler disagreed with the analysis but accepted it, enabling Macmillan to claim once again that he had declined the Foreign Office. Butler declined to accept Home's old place as Commonwealth Secretary.

In the October 1961 reshuffle, Butler lost the party chairmanship to Iain Macleod, who also insisted on getting the job of Leader of the House, which Butler had held since 1955. Butler retained the Home Office and declined Macmillan's suggestion to accept a peerage. Butler gave an excellent party conference speech in October 1961. In March 1962, Butler was made head of the newly-created Central African Department. Butler was, however, given oversight of the EEC entry negotiations, which he strongly supported despite worries about the agricultural vote in his constituency. A cartoon showed Macmillan and Butler as the miserable emigrating couple in Ford Madox Brown's painting The Last of England.

Butler helped to precipitate Macmillan's brutal "Night of the Long Knives" reshuffle by leaking to the Daily Mail on 11 July 1962 that a major reshuffle was imminent. He referred to it as the "Massacre of Glencoe". Macmillan later told Selwyn Lloyd on 1 August that he thought Butler had been planning to split the party over entry to the European Economic Community. In the reshuffle, Butler lost the Home Office although he kept the Central Africa Department. He also became the inaugural First Secretary of State, a position that was created partly to avoid the earlier constitutional objections to that of Deputy Prime Minister. However, he continued to act as a deputy for Macmillan, as he had earlier for Eden as well, including for six weeks during Macmillan's 1958 tour of the Commonwealth.

Macmillan allegedly told Butler that he was the most likely successor as prime minister, but Macmillan used the opportunity to promote younger men, who might provide an alternative. They included Lord Hailsham, who was given the task of negotiating the Test Ban Treaty; Reginald Maudling, who was appointed chancellor; and Edward Heath, who oversaw the EEC entry negotiations; he hoped to groom one of them as an alternative successor.

== Succession to Macmillan ==
=== Profumo, peerages and Africa ===
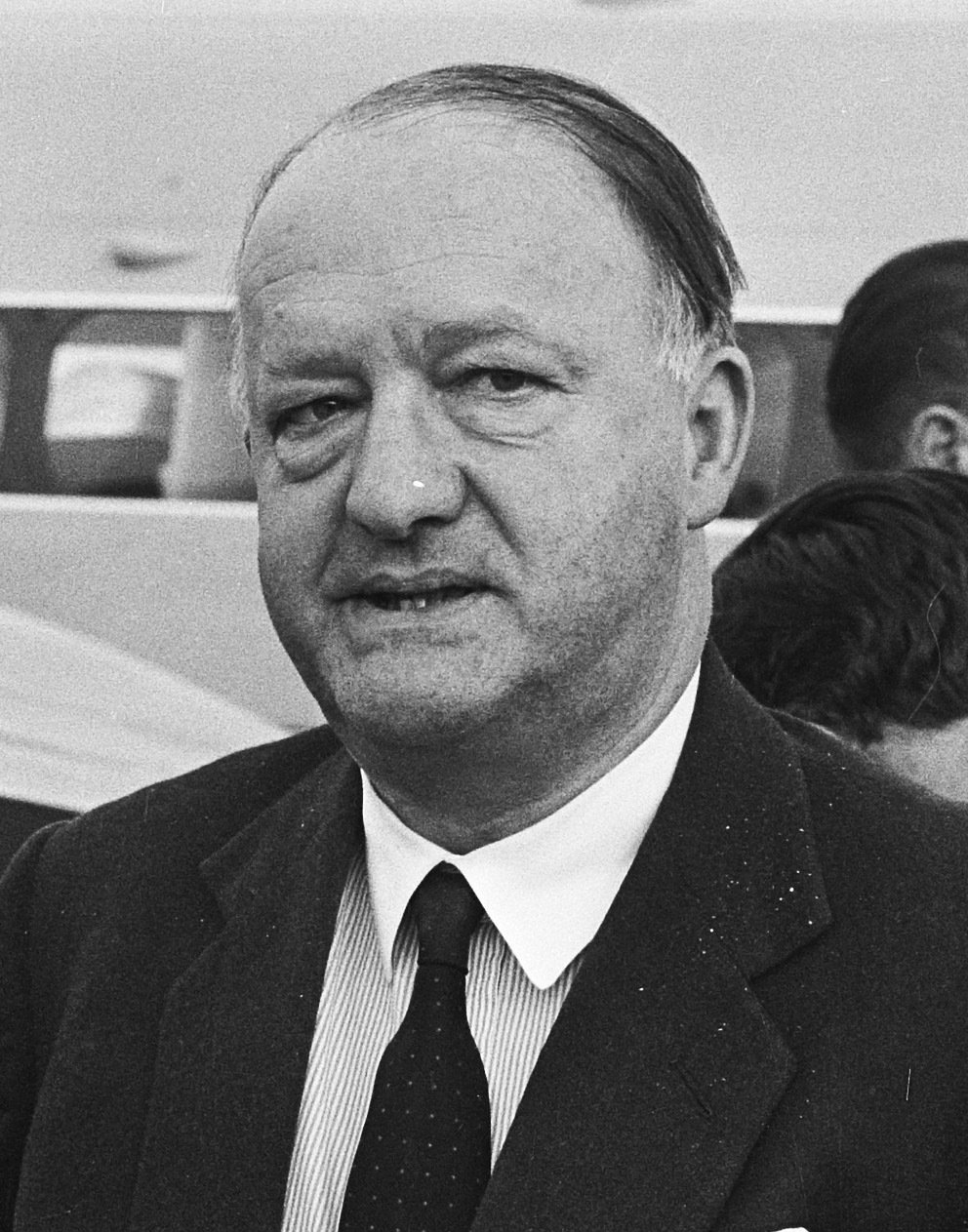
Butler in 1963

Butler told Tony Benn in February 1963 that he expected Macmillan to stay on and fight the next general election, which could occur no later than 1964. During the crisis caused by Profumo affair, Butler was asked by Martin Redmayne, the Conservative Chief Whip, and Lord Poole, Party Chairman, if he would in principle serve in a Maudling government. He was also visited by Maudling, the two men agreeing to serve under each other if necessary. Since Butler was technically his senior, Maudling believed that gave him an advantage. It was reported that the Cabinet generally backed Butler, but backbench MPs supported Maudling.

On 16 July, the Lords amended the Peerage Bill, which was then passing through Parliament, so that any existing peer could disclaim his peerage within twelve months of the bill becoming law, not after the next general election, as originally planned. The Peerage Act 1963 received Royal Assent on 31 July, which allowed Lords Hailsham and Home to become potential candidates for the succession.

By mid-1963, Butler had largely come to believe (or so he alleged in a 1966 interview) that he was probably too old for the leadership and that when Macmillan resigned, the position would go to a younger man. This may explain why Butler did not put up much of a fight for the leadership that autumn, although in fact Home, the eventually successful candidate, was almost exactly the same age as Butler, and both men were substantially younger than Macmillan himself had been when he first entered 10 Downing Street.

In the summer of 1963, Macmillan told Lord Hailsham, "Rab simply doesn't have it in him to be Prime Minister". Just before Butler departed for the Victoria Falls Conference in July 1963, John Morrison, still Chairman of the 1922 Committee, told him bluntly to his face: "The chaps won't have you".

At the Victoria Falls Conference, Butler dissolved the Central African Federation. The following year, the Nyasaland Protectorate became independent as Malawi and Northern Rhodesia as Zambia; Southern Rhodesia declared unilateral independence from Britain in 1965.

=== Conference and customary processes ===
In October 1963, Macmillan, having just decided to stay on and to lead the party into the next general election, was taken ill on the eve of the Conservative Party Conference. Butler insisted on occupying the leader's suite at the Imperial Hotel and on delivering the leader's speech on the final day (12 October). During the conference, Lord Home announced that Macmillan was to resign as prime minister. In the confusion of the next few days, Hailsham campaigned openly for the job in a manner that was considered vulgar. Butler, Home and their wives lunched together on Saturday 12 October. Home said that he would be seeing his doctor that week and so hinted that he might be about to put his name forward for the leadership. Butler's speech, when he delivered it, was an attempt to update the postwar Charters to modern politics, and he reprinted some of the speech verbatim in his memoirs. However, his delivery was, in Heath's later description, "monotonous and ineffective and did him no good whatever". Howard described it as "flat and uninspiring", and Peregrine Worsthorne wrote at the time that he spoke in a "limp and faltering voice". Butler later called the Imperial "that awful hotel" and refused to visit Blackpool ever again.

Back in London, Macmillan, from his hospital bed, proposed on 14 October a four-track consultation to "take soundings" (of the opinions of Cabinet, MPs, peers and leading members of the party organisation in the country) and to select a consensus leader through the "customary processes". The Cabinet met and was chaired by Butler on 15 October, and approved the plan, which was to be completed by 17 October. Howard argues that Butler should also have insisted that the Cabinet meet again on 17 October to approve the "results" of the soundings.

Selwyn Lloyd visited Macmillan in hospital on 16 October and argued against Butler, who he said was much disliked in the constituency associations "particularly the Women. Why that is, no one seems to know". Current ministers who visited Macmillan in hospital included Duncan Sandys, who advised for Home not as a compromise but on his own merits, and Edward Heath who felt that Butler would be uninspiring and had not emerged as a natural and undisputed successor in the way that he should have. Other ministers thought either Butler or Home to be suitable. Edward Boyle later felt he had been too favourable to the idea of a Home leadership, which led to him being wrongly recorded as a Home supporter. Sitting at the Cabinet table on 16 October during the soundings, Butler said "I don't know what's happening" before adding "but I do really". When asked what he would do if once again not appointed prime minister, he replied, "I shall behave with dignity".

=== Results of the consultations ===
Much ink has been spilled on how badly the consultation process was rigged, but Macmillan recommended the outside candidate Lord Home for the premiership.

Lord Chancellor Dilhorne had already begun polling the Cabinet at the Blackpool Conference and claimed that not counting Macmillan or Home, 10 were for Home (including Boyle and Macleod, both of whom later insisted that they supported Butler), 4 for Maudling (originally 3, amended to 5 and then down to 4), 3 for Butler and 2 for Hailsham. In a review of Horne's Life of Macmillan published in the London Review of Books in 1989, Gilmour argued that Dilhorne falsified the figures a claim that was repeated in 2004. Dilhorne recorded Hailsham as saying that he could "not" serve under Butler. Hailsham in fact claimed that he "had" offered to serve under Butler if necessary. Frederick Errol, President of the Board of Trade, had been told by Chief Whip Martin Redmayne at Blackpool that the succession had been already arranged for Home, as had John Boyd-Carpenter, a Butler supporter, on 9 October.

Redmayne's whips had also begun polling MPs and junior ministers at Blackpool and claimed that 87 supported Home and 86 Butler, another claim that was ridiculed by Ian Gilmour, and 65 MPs were found to be for Hailsham, 48 for Maudling, 12 for Macleod and 10 for Edward Heath, with Home being well ahead on second preferences. Despite denials by the whips, Redmayne let slip in a radio interview (19 December 1963, subsequently published in The Listener) about the four questions they asked: namely, their first and second preferences as leader, whether or not there was any candidate whom they especially "opposed" and whether they would in principle accept Home as leader. Humphry Berkeley refused to answer the "hypothetical question" of whether he would support Home as compromise between Butler and Hailsham. Jim Prior (then a backbencher) and Willie Whitelaw (then a junior minister) later recalled how they felt the whips were pushing Home's candidacy. Prior's first choice was Maudling and second Butler, and he opposed Hailsham but suspected that he had been recorded as pro-Home after repeated pushing on the fourth question. Whitelaw thought the fourth question "improper".

Amongst Conservative peers, Home led Butler by 2 to 1. The constituency parties, in so far as their views could be ascertained, were reported as being 60% for Hailsham and 40% for Butler, with strong opposition to both. They had not really been offered Home as a candidate, but it was reported that they would "rally round him".

=== The "Quad" rebel ===
The results of the consultation became known to the rest of the Cabinet around lunchtime on 17 October. Powell, Macleod, Hailsham and Maudling (known as "the Quad" in some accounts of the following days) were outraged and sought to persuade Butler to refuse to serve under Home in the belief that it would make a Home premiership impossible and result in Butler taking office. Macleod and Maudling demanded that Dilhorne lay the results of his consultations before the Cabinet, but he refused to do so. Butler was not present at the meetings (17 October) at 5pm at Macleod's flat and that night at Powell's house during which Maudling agreed to serve under Butler. Hailsham, who was at a separate gathering but keeping in touch with Powell's house by telephone, also agreed to serve under Butler. He telephoned Butler and repeated his answers aloud to the room as if he were a barrister "leading" a slow witness (Butler said that he had been "dozing off" and ended the conversation by repeating that he was off to do so) before telling him "you must put on your armour, dear Rab". The "Quad" summoned Martin Redmayne, who stood firm against their demands. They demanded that he pass on their concerns to the Palace. Then, Lord Aldington, who had also been at the meeting, drove Redmayne back and telephoned Sir Michael Adeane, the Queen's Private Secretary, to make sure the message was passed on.

Powell, a wartime brigadier, observed that they had given Butler a loaded revolver, which he had refused to use on the grounds that it might make a noise. Macleod commented that they had put the "golden ball in his lap, if he drops it now it's his own fault".

The Times wrote of Butler on Friday morning (18 October) that "he always looks as if he will be the next Prime Minister until it seems that the throne may actually be vacant". Macmillan finally resigned that morning, the Queen calling on him in hospital shortly afterwards to receive his written "advice". He had likened the "Quad" to the Fox-North Coalition and had to urge Home, who had agreed to stand only as a compromise candidate, not to withdraw. Butler called Dilhorne the same morning to demand a meeting of the three main candidates (Butler, Home and Maudling) before the succession was resolved; "no reply was vouchsafed", as Butler put it. Butler, Macleod, Hailsham and Maudling met at the Treasury on 18 October as Home was at the Palace, accepting the Queen's invitation to " try" to form a government.

Butler was pushing for a two-way meeting with Home, but he should, in Howard's view, have insisted on Home confronting the "Quad". Home immediately moved into Number 10 and interviewed Butler then Maudling early in the afternoon. Butler did not at first agree to serve, as he had reservations about whether Home, a peer and not a moderniser, was a suitable prime minister. Hailsham, Butler and Maudling finally met Home that evening after dinner, by which time Hailsham was already wavering and expressing a willingness to serve under Home. Butler's old friend, Geoffrey Lloyd, sat up with him until 3am on the morning of Saturday 19 October, telling him that "if you're not prepared to put everything to the touch, you don't deserve to be Prime Minister".

=== Butler agrees to serve ===
The next morning (19 October), Butler and then Maudling agreed to serve under Home, who returned to the Palace to report that he could "form a government" and to "kiss hands", i.e. formally accept appointment as prime minister. The Queen is thought to have privately preferred Home, whom she knew well socially, to Butler, although that did not influence the decision. The Palace knew that Home could not form a government without Butler serving, although Home himself later said that he could have formed a government without Butler but not without Maudling.

Some, including Macmillan, argued that Butler's vacillation was further proof of his unfitness to be prime minister. Lord Poole commented that "if you had seen him yesterday morning, dithering about in a gutless sort of way, you would not want him to be Prime Minister of this country. I was quite appalled, quite disgusted".

Butler later alleged in a letter to The Times that not to have served might have led to a Labour government; the suggestion was later dismissed as absurd by Wilson himself. Butler later described Home as an "amiable enough creature". He was motivated by his knowledge of Robert Peel and the split over the Corn Laws. He later told Elizabeth Longford that it was "the supremely unforgettable political lesson of history.... I could never do the same thing in the twentieth century, under any circumstances whatever".

Powell and Macleod refused to serve under Home. Butler had planned to make Macleod Chancellor of the Exchequer and discussed the names of economists who could be asked to advise.

Butler was less devastated than in 1957, as this time, it was largely a voluntary abnegation. In a BBC radio interview in 1978, he discussed that in 1963, he had been passed over in favour of a "terrific gent", not a "most ghastly walrus". Home and even Macmillan himself in the 1980s later conceded that it might have been better if Butler had become leader. The episode of Home's elevation was a public relations disaster for the Conservatives, who decided to elect their next leader (Edward Heath in 1965) by a transparent ballot of MPs.

== Foreign Secretary under Douglas-Home ==
Home appointed Butler Foreign Secretary but he lost the title of deputy prime minister. Macmillan, trying to control events from his sickbed, had urged Home to appoint Heath as Foreign Secretary but conceded that allowing Butler to have the position that he had always coveted might be a necessary price for his agreeing to serve.

Macleod's article in The Spectator of 17 January 1964 in which he claimed that the leadership had been stitched up by a "Magic Circle" of Old Etonians damaged Macleod in the eyes of Conservatives, but some of the damage stuck to Butler as well. Butler later wrote in The Art of Memory that "every word" of Macleod's Spectator article "[wa]s true".

Butler was able to speak fluent French to French Foreign Minister Maurice Couve de Murville to the latter's surprise but there was no movement on Britain's ambitions to join the EEC so soon after the French veto on Macmillan's application. Butler made two major foreign trips. First, to Washington (and then on to Tokyo and Manila) in late March 1964, where US President Lyndon Johnson complained about the sale of British-made buses to Castro-controlled Cuba, which was under a US trade embargo. The second was to Moscow, and notable only as Khruschev's last meeting with a Western politician before he was ousted. Butler was Foreign Secretary at the time of the Sunda Straits Crisis, where he took a characteristic line in arguing that the aircraft carrier HMS Victorious should be diverted to avoid confrontation with the Indonesian government. During the Cyprus Crisis of 1963-1964, with was primarily the responsibility of the Commonwealth Office, Butler largely delegated responsibility for the Foreign Office's interests to his deputy, Lord Carrington.

Butler played only a small part in the 1964 general election campaign. He showed his lack of stomach for the fight by agreeing with the journalist George Gale of the Daily Express that the very close campaign "might yet slip away" in the "last few days". Randolph Churchill wrote that he had "uttered his own death-wish and death warrant". He would not have retained the Foreign Office if the Conservatives had won. The job had already been promised to Christopher Soames. Many, including Wilson, said that Butler would have won the 1964 general election if he had been prime minister.

At the comparatively early age of 61, Butler left office with one of the longest records of ministerial experience for contemporary politicians. After the election, he lost the chairmanship of the Conservative Research Department, which he had headed for 20 years, and refused Home's offer of an earldom, a rank normally granted to former prime ministers at the time (Harold Macmillan, for example, refused a barony in 1964 but accepted an earldom in 1984).

== Later life ==
=== Master of Trinity and memoirs ===
Butler remained on the Conservative front bench into the next year as Shadow Foreign Secretary. Harold Wilson felt that the Conservatives had made Butler a scapegoat after the Daily Express incident during the election, and on 23 December 1964, Wilson offered him the job of Master of Trinity College, Cambridge (where Butler's great-uncle Henry Montagu Butler had previously been Master and the incumbent Lord Adrian was due to retire on 30 June 1965). Butler did not accept until the middle of January and took office at the start of the new academic year on 7 October 1965. On 19 February 1965, he was created a life peer as Baron Butler of Saffron Walden, of Halstead in the County of Essex; because of his appointment as master he sat as a cross-bench peer in the House of Lords. Between the 1964 election and his retirement from the House of Commons, he had been Father of the House.

There was little consultation of Trinity fellows prior to Butler's appointment, but his opponents backed down in the face of public approval. Butler was the first master in 250 years who had not himself been a student at the college.

King Charles III, then Prince of Wales, studied at Trinity (1967–1970) during Butler's time as Master. Initially it was thought that he might study an ad hoc course; a humorous cartoon showed Butler telling the Prince that he was to study a specially made-up history course "in which I become Prime Minister". Instead Butler recommended that unlike previous members of the Royal Family, Prince Charles live in College, study for a normal degree and sit Finals like any other undergraduate. After initial reluctance, the Palace agreed. Butler was publicly promoted as a mentor and counsellor to the Prince by making himself available for a 45-minute time slot each evening before dinner if the Prince wished to seek his advice. He turned a blind eye to Prince Charles keeping a car in college (in breach of the rules) but exclaimed "Hell no!" when the Prince asked if he might join the Labour Club. Butler also gave Lucia Santa Cruz, his research assistant for his memoirs, a key to the Master's Lodge and often let her stay, which gave rise to rumours that he was facilitating a romance between her and the Prince. Butler's appointment to the Order of the Garter on 23 April 1971 was seen as a gesture of recognition for his guidance of the young Prince.

Butler soon earned respect by his brisk chairing of College Council Meetings, which was important because of Trinity College's huge investments in land and businesses, which generated an income of £1 million per annum at the time. He was also a director of Courtaulds, the family company, at this time. By 1971, the fellows had warmed to him enough to vote recommending (successfully) that he be given a second six-year term, despite the normal retirement age for masters being seventy.

Butler's memoirs, The Art of the Possible, appeared in 1971. He wrote that he had decided to "eschew the current autobiographical fashion for multi-volume histories". (Macmillan was bringing out an autobiography, which would eventually run to six large volumes.) The work, largely ghosted by Peter Goldman, was described as the best single-volume autobiography since Duff Cooper's Old Men Forget in 1953.

Butler also served active as the first Chancellor of the University of Essex from 1966 to his death and Chancellor of the University of Sheffield from 1959 to 1977. He was High Steward of Cambridge University from 1958 to 1966 and High Steward of the City of Cambridge from 1963 until his death.

=== Second term at Trinity ===
From 1972 to 1975, Butler chaired the high-profile Committee on Mentally Abnormal Offenders, which was widely referred to as the Butler Committee and which proposed major reforms to the law and psychiatric services, some of which have been implemented.

By the early 1970s, Butler's physical and mental powers were in unmistakable decline. He was, in the description of Charles Moore, then a student at Trinity, well into his "anecdotage". He scaled back his public appearances after an incident at the Booker Prize awards in London in December 1973, at which he told ill-judged anti-Semitic jokes, which caused grave offence to the publisher George Weidenfeld.

As early as 1938, Chips Channon had called Butler's clothes "truly tragic" and as he grew older, Butler acquired an ever more dishevelled appearance. He ate and drank copiously as Master of Trinity, which caused him to put on weight and to begin to suffer from heart problems. On a visit to Cambridge in 1975, the first time that the two men had met in a decade, Macmillan commented on how fat Butler had become. Butler also suffered from a skin complaint from the 1950s, which grew progressively worse to the point towards the end of his life, he would sometimes appear unshaven in public.

In June and October 1976, he spoke in the House of Lords against the planned nationalisation of Felixstowe Docks, owned by Trinity College. He argued that Trinity, which has had more Nobel Prize winners than the whole of France, spent the income on science research and on subsidising smaller Cambridge colleges. The bill was abandoned after it was delayed by the House of Lords.

Butler's term as Master ended in 1978. Butler House at Trinity is named after him.

=== Final years ===
Butler published The Conservatives in 1977. His last speech in the House of Lords, in March 1980, was to defend the provision of free school buses, which he regarded as vital for Conservative support in rural areas. His last public appearance, by which time he was unwell and had to remain seated, was on 13 January 1982 at the unveiling of his portrait at the National Portrait Gallery, London.

Butler died of colon cancer in March 1982 in Great Yeldham, Essex. He is buried in the churchyard of the parish church of St Mary the Virgin in Saffron Walden (see image). His will was probated at £748,789 (21 October 1982) (over £2.3m at 2014 prices). His banner as Knight Companion of the Order of the Garter hangs in the church of St Mary's, Saffron Walden (see image).

A further volume of memoirs, The Art of Memory, appeared posthumously in 1982; modelled on Churchill's Great Contemporaries, Howard suggests that it matches his "neither in verve nor anecdote". His son Adam Butler was an MP from 1970 to 1987 and a junior minister under Margaret Thatcher. His grandson Ed Butler is a retired Brigadier who commanded 16 Air Assault Brigade and 22 Special Air Service.

== Assessments ==
Butler opened his memoirs by saying that his career had been split between academia, politics and India and that his main regret was never having been Viceroy of India. He regarded the Government of India Act 1935 and the Education Act 1944 as his "principal legislative achievements". He also wrote that the way to the top was through rebellion and resignation, but he had gone for "the long haul" and "steady influence". In an obvious dig at Home, he said in retirement "I may never have known much about fishing or flower-arranging, but one thing I did know was how to govern the people of this country".

His obituary in The Times in 1982 called him "the creator of the modern educational system, the key-figure in the revival of post-war Conservatism, arguably the most successful chancellor since the war and unquestionably a Home Secretary of reforming zeal".

Along with the Education Act 1944 and Butler's reforms as Home Secretary, John Campbell sees Butler's greatest achievement as the "redefine(ing of) the meaning of Conservatism" in opposition by encouraging the careers of talented younger men at the Research Department (Heath, Powell, Maudling, Macleod and Angus Maude, all of whom entered Parliament in 1950), by ensuring Conservative acceptance of the welfare state and a commitment to keeping unemployment low. Macmillan acknowledged Butler's role in his memoirs but stressed that those were the very policies that he had promoted in vain in the 1930s. Butler enjoyed 26.5 years in office, equalled only by Churchill in the twentieth century.

His biographer Michael Jago argues that the Latin tag which Butler applied to Eden, omnium consensu capax imperii nisi imperasset ("by common consent fit to rule as long as he didn't rule"), could have been applied just as accurately to Butler himself. While Butler was possibly the best chancellor since 1945, this was overshadowed by the disastrous budgets in 1955. Combined with Suez, these destroyed his chances of becoming prime minister even without Macmillan's opposition in 1963; "the coup de grace administered seven years later by Macmillan was posthumous". He also suggests Butler's handling of the Central African Federation, despite his illness, suggests that he may have been "the best Foreign Secretary Britain never had", but these qualities were negated by his chronic indecisiveness, often about petty matters. He argues that he was indecisive as chancellor, and recounts how during the Profumo Affair he once telephoned a junior civil servant to ask what he should do, as well as occasions on which he was unable to decide on the menu for an official lunch, or whether to attend a reception at the Moroccan Embassy.

Roy Jenkins, describing a stormy meeting that Butler had with Lyndon B. Johnson, pinpointed a tendency in Butler's character in that "while Butler represented the forces of urbane, civilised superiority and Johnson the raw brashness of the insecure arriviste, it was also the case that Butler was the natural servant of the state and LBJ the natural ruler". He noted that a similar dynamic was at work in Butler's relations with the equally domineering Winston Churchill. Butler is remembered for his efforts as a progressive conservative to reform the Conservative Party, although he had been considered "too openly progressive for a Conservative leader even in the 1950’s."

Edward Pearce wrote of his legislative record that "Rab's failure was more brilliant than most politicians' success".

Iain Macleod said of him that "Rab loves being a politician among academics and an academic among politicians; that is why neither breed of man likes him all that much". Lobby correspondents (journalists who report on political affairs, including non-attributable information leaked to them) were advised never to believe anything that Butler told them but never to ignore anything he told them either. Ian Gilmour argues that Butler was always more popular in the country than in his own party and that he acquired an unjust reputation for deviousness, but was in fact less so than a number of his colleagues.

The Guardian and the Daily Mirror praised him on his return to Cambridge in June 1965 but wrote that he had lacked the ruthless streak needed to get to the very top in politics. The Economist (27 June 1970) called him "the last real policy-making Chancellor".

== Personal life ==
On 20 April 1926, Butler married Sydney Elizabeth Courtauld (1902–1954), the daughter of Samuel Courtauld and co-heiress to the Courtaulds textile fortune. He received Stanstead Hall as a wedding gift. They had four children:

- Sir Richard Clive Butler (1929–2012), President of the National Farmers' Union from 1979 to 1986;
- Sir Adam Courtauld Butler (1931–2008), also a politician, father of Brigadier Ed Butler (born 1962);
- Samuel James Butler (1936–2015), father of Fleur Butler (born 1967); and
- Sarah Teresa Butler (born 1944).

Sydney died of cancer in 1954, and in 1959, Butler married again, this time to Mollie Courtauld (1908–2009), who was the widow of Sydney's cousin, Augustine Courtauld. They purchased Spencers, the house in Essex in which Mollie had lived with Augustine Courtauld. (Note: A Georgian house famous for its gardens, it contains the Delphinium 'Lord Butler', named after its previous owner.) She remained there until her death on 18 February 2009, at the age of 101.

== Arms ==
Coat of arms of Rab Butler
Crest A falcon rising belled and jessed the dexter leg resting on a covered cup all Or. Escutcheon Gules on a chevron cottised between three covered cups all Or a cross couped Azure. Supporters Dexter a falcon belled Or, sinister an eagle Proper, each standing on a book Or. Motto Audentior

== Sources ==
- Addison, Paul (1994). The Road to 1945. London: Pimlico. ISBN 978-0712659321.
- Brazier, Rodney (2020). Choosing a Prime Minister: The Transfer of Power in Britain. Oxford University Press. ISBN 978-0198859291.
- Campbell, John (2010). Pistols at Dawn: Two Hundred Years of Political Rivalry from Pitt and Fox to Blair and Brown. Vintage. ISBN 978-1-845-95091-0.
- Cosgrave, Patrick (1981). R.A.Butler: An English Life. Quartet Books. ISBN 978-0704322585.
- Dell, Edmund. The Chancellors: A History of the Chancellors of the Exchequer, 1945–90 (HarperCollins, 1997) pp 159–206, covers his term as chancellor.
- Hennessy, Peter., Having It So Good: Britain In The Fifties, Penguin Books, 2006, ISBN 978-0-14-100409-9
- Horne, Alistair (1989). Macmillan Volume II: 1957–1986. Macmillan. ISBN 978-0-333-49621-3.
- Howard, Anthony (1987). RAB: The Life of R. A. Butler. Jonathan Cape. ISBN 978-0-224-01862-3.
- Jago, Michael (2015). Rab Butler: The Best Prime Minister We Never Had?. Biteback Publishing. ISBN 978-1849549202.
- Jeffereys, Kevin (1984). "R. A. Butler, the Board of Education and the 1944 Education Act". History. 69 (227): 415–431. doi:10.1111/j.1468-229X.1984.tb01429.x. JSTOR 24419691.
- Gilmour, Ian (2004). Matthew, Colin (ed.). R.A Butler (1902-1982) in Dictionary of National Biography. Vol. 9. Oxford University Press. ISBN 978-0198614111.
- Middleton, Nigel. "Lord Butler and the Education Act of 1944," British Journal of Educational Studies (1972) 20#2 pp 178–191
- Morris, Ted. Managing Decline: British Foreign Secretaries of the Twentieth Century (2025). Troubador.
- Pearce, Edward The Lost Leaders (Little, Brown & Company 1997 ISBN 978-0316641784), (essays on Butler, Iain Macleod and Denis Healey),
- Roberts, Andrew (1991). Holy Fox: Biography of Lord Halifax (2004 ed.). Phoenix. ISBN 978-1-857-99472-8.
- Rollings, Neil (1994). "Poor Mr Butskell: A Short Life, Wrecked by Schizophrenia?". Twentieth Century British History. 5 (2): 183–205. doi:10.1093/tcbh/5.2.183.
- Shlaim, Avi; Jones, Peter; Sainsbury, Keith. British Foreign Secretaries Since 1945 (1977). David & Charles.
- Stafford, Paul (1985). "Political Autobiography and the Art of the Plausible: RA Butler at the Foreign Office, 1938–1939". Historical Journal. 28 (4): 901–922. doi:10.1017/S0018246X00005124. JSTOR 2639327. S2CID 153663959.
- Thorpe, D. R. (2010). Supermac: The Life of Harold Macmillan. London: Chatto & Windus. ISBN 978-1844135417.

=== Primary sources ===
- Butler, Rab (1971). The Art of the Possible. London: Hamish Hamilton. ISBN 978-0241020074., his autobiography
- Heath, Edward (1998). The Course of my Life: The Autobiography of Edward Heath. London: Hodder & Stoughton. ISBN 978-0340708521.
- Brazier, Rodney (2020). Choosing a Prime Minister: The Transfer of Power in Britain. Oxford University Press. pp. 70, 73, 75.

Parliament of the United Kingdom
Preceded by William Mitchell	Member of Parliament for Saffron Walden; 1929–1965	Succeeded by Peter Kirk
Political offices
Preceded by The Marquess of Lothian	Under Secretary of State for India; 1932–1937	Succeeded by The Lord Stanley
Preceded by Anthony Muirhead	Parliamentary Secretary to the Ministry of Labour; 1937–1938	Succeeded by Alan Lennox-Boyd
Preceded by The Viscount Cranborne	Under Secretary of State for Foreign Affairs; 1938–1941; Served alongside: The Earl of Plymouth (1938–1940)	Succeeded by Richard Law
Preceded by Herwald Ramsbotham	President of the Board of Education; 1941–1944	Succeeded by Himself as Minister of Education
Preceded by Himself as President of the Board of Education	Minister of Education; 1944–1945	Succeeded by Richard Law
Preceded by Ernest Bevin	Minister of Labour and National Service; 1945	Succeeded by George Isaacs
Preceded by Oliver Stanley	Shadow Chancellor of the Exchequer; 1950–1951	Succeeded by Hugh Gaitskell
Preceded by Hugh Gaitskell	Chancellor of the Exchequer; 1951–1955	Succeeded by Harold Macmillan
Preceded by Harry Crookshank	Lord Privy Seal; 1955–1959	Succeeded by The Viscount Hailsham
Preceded by Harry Crookshank	Leader of the House of Commons; 1955–1961	Succeeded by Iain Macleod
Preceded by Gwilym Lloyd George	Home Secretary; 1957–1962	Succeeded by Henry Brooke
Vacant Title last held by Anthony Eden	Deputy Prime Minister of the United Kingdom; 1962–1963	Vacant Title next held by Willie Whitelaw
New office	First Secretary of State; 1962–1963	Vacant Title next held by George Brown
Preceded by Alec Douglas-Home	Secretary of State for Foreign Affairs; 1963–1964	Succeeded by Patrick Gordon-Walker
Preceded by Patrick Gordon-Walker	Shadow Foreign Secretary; 1964–1965	Succeeded by Reginald Maudling
Academic offices
Preceded by Tom Honeyman	Rector of the University of Glasgow; 1956–1959	Succeeded by The Viscount Hailsham
Preceded by The Earl of Halifax	Chancellor of the University of Sheffield; 1959–1977	Succeeded by Frederick Dainton
Preceded by The Lord Adrian	Master of Trinity College, Cambridge; 1965–1978	Succeeded by Alan Hodgkin
New office	Chancellor of the University of Essex; 1966–1982	Succeeded by Patrick Nairne
Party political offices
Preceded by The Viscount Hailsham	Chairman of the Conservative Party; 1959–1961	Succeeded by Iain Macleod
