= 2003 Richmondshire District Council election =

Regional election in England

Map of the results of the 2003 Richmondshire District Council election. Conservatives in blue, independents in light grey, Liberal Democrats in yellow, Richmondshire Independents in white and Social Democratic Party in purple.

The 2003 Richmondshire District Council election took place on 1 May 2003 to elect members of Richmondshire District Council in North Yorkshire, England. The whole council was up for election with boundary changes since the last election in 1999. The council stayed under no overall control.

== Background ==
Before the election the council was run by the independents with support from the Conservatives, while the Liberal Democrats formed the opposition. The independents were divided into two groups after the Richmondshire Independent Group split from the Richmondshire Association of Independent Councillors in 2001.

Almost a third of the councillors stood down at the 2003 election, including a former chairperson of the council, Jane Metcalfe, and the Liberal Democrat group leader, Richard Good. Other councillors who stood down included Alison Appleton, Colin Bailey, Grace Buckle, Sylvia Golding, Mike Graham, Terry Jones, Andrea Robson and Nigel Watson.

A total of 56 candidates stood in 2003, with several being elected without opposition, however there were no candidates from the Labour Party. The two groups of independents stood against each in several wards including Colburn, Hornby Castle and Melsonby. Meanwhile, the leader of the council, John Blackie, contested the election as a Conservative after having previously led the Richmondshire Association of Independent Councillors.

== Election result ==
The Conservatives became the largest group on the council with 11 councillors, after gaining four seats, but without a majority. Nine independents were elected, a gain of four, while the Liberal Democrats dropped two to have eight councillors.

The council leader John Blackie held his seat in Hawes as a Conservative, while councillors who were defeated included Liberal Democrat Patrick Brennan in Catterick, Richmondshire Independent Helen Grant and Katherine Kerr in Richmond Central. Overall turnout at the election was 37.69%, down from 40.22% in 1999.

Following the election Yvonne Peacock became leader of the Conservative group, Richard Dunn leader of the Richmondshire Association of Independent Councillors, John Harris leader of the Liberal Democrat group and Paul Cullen leader of the Richmondshire Independent Group. Conservative John Blackie continued as leader of the council, defeating a challenge from the Liberal Democrat group leader John Harris.

Richmondshire local election result 2003
Party	Seats	Gains	Losses	Net gain/loss	Seats %	Votes %	Votes	+/−
Conservative	11			+4	32.4	29.1	3,857	+0.6%
Independent	9			+4	26.5	21.5	2,853	+1.6%
Liberal Democrats	8			-2	23.5	27.1	3,602	-16.5%
Richmondshire Independent Group	5			-7	14.7	18.6	2,464	+18.6%
SDP	1			+1	2.9	3.7	492	-4.3%

== Ward results ==
Addlebrough
Party	Candidate	Votes	%	±%
Conservative	Yvonne Peacock	unopposed		

Barton
Party	Candidate	Votes	%	±%
Independent	Campbell Dawson	285	57.5	
Liberal Democrats	Amanda Adams	211	42.5	
Majority		74	14.9	
Turnout		496	48.8	

Bolton Castle
Party	Candidate	Votes	%	±%
Conservative	Wendy Morton	384	72.7	
Liberal Democrats	John Weedon	144	27.3	
Majority		240	45.5	
Turnout		528	51.7	

Brompton on Swale and Scorton (2 seats)
Party	Candidate	Votes	%	±%
Conservative	Michael Heseltine	559		
Independent	James Fryer	417		
Liberal Democrats	Leslie Rowe	298		
Turnout		1,274	37.7	

Catterick (2 seats)
Party	Candidate	Votes	%	±%
SDP	Anthony Pelton	492		
Conservative	Robert Johnson	326		
Liberal Democrats	Patrick Brennan	310		
Turnout		1,128	37.0	

Colburn (3 seats)
Party	Candidate	Votes	%	±%
Independent	Peter Wood	384		
Independent	William Glover	375		
Richmondshire Independent Group	Lynn Miller	323		
Richmondshire Independent Group	Helen Grant	311		
Independent	Janet Kirk	187		
Turnout		1,580	30.5	

Croft
Party	Candidate	Votes	%	±%
Liberal Democrats	Jane Parlour	280	51.4	
Independent	Kenneth Smith	265	48.6	
Majority		15	2.8	
Turnout		545	53.7	

Gilling West
Party	Candidate	Votes	%	±%
Richmondshire Independent Group	John Cronin	268	67.0	
Conservative	John Hartley	132	33.0	
Majority		136	34.0	
Turnout		400	41.9	

Hawes and High Abbotside
Party	Candidate	Votes	%	±%
Conservative	John Blackie	487	87.7	
Richmondshire Independent Group	Clive Rudd	68	12.3	
Majority		419	75.5	
Turnout		555	53.0	

Hipswell (2 seats)
Party	Candidate	Votes	%	±%
Richmondshire Independent Group	Paul Cullen	149		
Liberal Democrats	Ann Bagley	130		
Conservative	Melva Steckles	108		
Independent	Betty Robertson	70		
Turnout		457	16.7	

Hornby Castle
Party	Candidate	Votes	%	±%
Independent	Richard Dunn	290	87.3	
Richmondshire Independent Group	Andrew Munro	42	12.7	
Majority		248	74.7	
Turnout		332	35.3	

Leyburn (2 seats)
Party	Candidate	Votes	%	±%
Conservative	David Morton	423		
Liberal Democrats	Frances Ramsbottom	238		
Liberal Democrats	Kathleen Weedon	193		
Turnout		854	31.3	

Lower Wensleydale
Party	Candidate	Votes	%	±%
Conservative	Keith Loadman	unopposed		

Melsonby
Party	Candidate	Votes	%	±%
Independent	John Gill	226	56.5	
Richmondshire Independent Group	Timothy Place	174	43.5	
Majority		52	13.0	
Turnout		400	37.4	

Middleham
Party	Candidate	Votes	%	±%
Conservative	Howard Thomas	unopposed		

Middleton Tyas
Party	Candidate	Votes	%	±%
Conservative	Jill McMullon	380	75.1	
Richmondshire Independent Group	Harold Joicey	126	24.9	
Majority		254	50.2	
Turnout		506	49.6	

Newsham with Eppleby
Party	Candidate	Votes	%	±%
Richmondshire Independent Group	David Maude	unopposed		

Penhill
Party	Candidate	Votes	%	±%
Conservative	George Dent	unopposed		

Reeth and Arkengarthdale
Party	Candidate	Votes	%	±%
Independent	Oswin Kendall	unopposed		

Richmond Central (2 seats)
Party	Candidate	Votes	%	±%
Liberal Democrats	Clive World	480		
Liberal Democrats	Sheila Clarke	381		
Richmondshire Independent Group	Katherine Carr	368		
Conservative	David Johnson	323		
Turnout		1,552	40.1	

Richmond East (2 seats)
Party	Candidate	Votes	%	±%
Liberal Democrats	John Harris	486		
Richmondshire Independent Group	Thomas Burrows	409		
Conservative	Iain McDougall	408		
Liberal Democrats	John Robinson	342		
Turnout		1,645	45.6	

Richmond West (2 seats)
Party	Candidate	Votes	%	±%
Liberal Democrats	Linda Curran	unopposed		
Liberal Democrats	Stuart Parsons	unopposed		

Scotton (2 seats)
Party	Candidate	Votes	%	±%
Independent	Patricia Middlemiss	204		
Independent	David Leadbeatter	150		
Liberal Democrats	Karin Ecker	109		
Richmondshire Independent Group	Michael Kerr	105		
Turnout		568	17.8	

Swaledale
Party	Candidate	Votes	%	±%
Conservative	Raymond Alderson	327	73.0	
Richmondshire Independent Group	Stephen Smethurst	121	27.0	
Majority		206	46.0	
Turnout		448	46.6	

== By-elections between 2003 and 2007 ==
A by-election was held in Gilling West on 2 November 2006 after the resignation of independent councillor John Cronin. The seat was won by independent William Heslop with a majority of 116 votes over Conservative candidate Margaret Turnbull.

Gilling West by-election 2 November 2006
Party	Candidate	Votes	%	±%
Independent	William Heslop	258	64.5	−2.5
Conservative	Margaret Turnbull	142	35.5	+2.5
Majority		116	29.0	−5.0
Turnout		400	40.4	−1.5
Independent hold		Swing		
