= Operation ROBOT =

Operation ROBOT was an economic policy devised by HM Treasury in 1952 under Chancellor of the Exchequer R. A. Butler but which was never implemented. It was named after three of its civil servant advocates, Sir Leslie ROwan, Sir George BOlton and OTto Clarke.

During the winter of 1951–52 in Britain there was anxiety over the balance of payments and the reduction of Britain's gold reserves. R. A. Butler, the Chancellor, advocated floating the exchange rate and allowing sterling to find its own level and to be convertible. Butler acknowledged that his proposals would end the Keynesian full employment policies of the previous twelve years but claimed that the burden would fall not on Britain's precarious gold reserves but on the exchange rate. British exports would become cheaper, imports would become more expensive, food prices would rise, as would the prices of raw materials and possibly unemployment would also rise under the scheme. Clarke claimed that a free exchange rate would be 'painful' but would impose severe discipline upon British industry because of its exposure to the world markets.

The most prominent of those who urged for its rejection were a Treasury under-secretary, E. R. Coplestone, and Lord Cherwell, the Paymaster General. Cherwell argued that unemployment would rise to one million and inflation could increase if the plan was implemented. He also argued that it would be political suicide, which would end in disaster. Both the Governor (Lord Cobbold) and the deputy governor (Sir George Bolton) of the Bank of England, as well as the Colonial Secretary Oliver Lyttelton, were in favour of implementing it.

In February 1952 the Cabinet rejected it as too risky.
