= 2007 Richmondshire District Council election =

English election

Map of the results of the 2007 Richmondshire District Council election. independents in light grey, Conservatives in blue and Liberal Democrats in yellow.

The 2007 Richmondshire District Council election took place on 3 May 2007 to elect members of Richmondshire District Council in North Yorkshire, England. The whole council was up for election and the council stayed under no overall control.

== Election result ==
Richmondshire local election result 2007
Party	Seats	Gains	Losses	Net gain/loss	Seats %	Votes %	Votes	+/−
Independent	15	0	4	-4	44.1	34.6	4,781	+13.1%
Conservative	13	6	0	+6	38.2	29.9	4,133	+0.8%
Liberal Democrats	6	0	2	-2	17.6	30.9	4,267	+3.8%
Green	0	0	0	0	0	3.0	421	+3.0%
BNP	0	0	0	0	0	1.6	221	+1.6%

== Ward results ==
Addlebrough
Party	Candidate	Votes	%	±%
Independent	Yvonne Peacock	539	88.5	
Liberal Democrats	John Weedon	70	11.5	
Majority		469	77.0	
Turnout		609	54.8	
Independent hold		Swing		

Barton
Party	Candidate	Votes	%	±%
Conservative	Campbell Dawson	345	66.2	+66.2
Liberal Democrats	Amanda Adams	176	33.8	−8.7
Majority		169	32.4	
Turnout		521	51.4	+2.6
Conservative hold		Swing		

Bolton Castle
Party	Candidate	Votes	%	±%
Conservative	Susan Fairhurst	unopposed		
Conservative hold		Swing		

Brompton on Swale and Scorton (2 seats)
Party	Candidate	Votes	%	±%
Conservative	Michael Heseltine	643		
Independent	James Fryer	475		
Green	Leslie Rowe	421		
Turnout		1,539	41.0	+3.3
Conservative hold		Swing		
Independent hold		Swing		

Catterick (2 seats)
Party	Candidate	Votes	%	±%
Conservative	Jane Branch	403		
Independent	Rob Johnson	318		
Liberal Democrats	Patrick Brennan	247		
BNP	Chris Goodwin	123		
BNP	Jack Goodwin	98		
Turnout		1,189	42.4	+5.4
Conservative gain from Independent		Swing		
Independent hold		Swing		

Colburn (3 seats)
Party	Candidate	Votes	%	±%
Independent	Bill Glover	unopposed		
Independent	Helen Grant	unopposed		
Independent	Peter Wood	unopposed		
Independent hold		Swing		
Independent hold		Swing		
Independent hold		Swing		

Croft
Party	Candidate	Votes	%	±%
Liberal Democrats	Jane Parlour	unopposed		
Liberal Democrats hold		Swing		

Gilling West
Party	Candidate	Votes	%	±%
Independent	William Heslop	unopposed		
Independent hold		Swing		

Hawes and High Abbotside
Party	Candidate	Votes	%	±%
Independent	John Blackie	unopposed		
Independent hold		Swing		

Hipswell (2 seats)
Party	Candidate	Votes	%	±%
Conservative	Alicia Tye	246		
Independent	Paul Cullen	240		
Liberal Democrats	Paula Quirie	164		
Liberal Democrats	Mark Goff	141		
Turnout		791	23.0	+6.3
Conservative gain from Liberal Democrats		Swing		
Independent hold		Swing		

Hornby Castle
Party	Candidate	Votes	%	±%
Conservative	Melva Steckles	294	65.0	+65.0
Independent	Tony Pelton	158	35.0	−52.3
Majority		136	30.1	
Turnout		452	41.7	+6.4
Conservative gain from Independent		Swing		

Leyburn (2 seats)
Party	Candidate	Votes	%	±%
Conservative	Tony Duff	516		
Conservative	Fleur Butler	478		
Liberal Democrats	Kitty Weedon	286		
Independent	Derek Wallace	192		
Turnout		1,472	40.0	+8.7
Conservative hold		Swing		
Conservative gain from Liberal Democrats		Swing		

Lower Wensleydale
Party	Candidate	Votes	%	±%
Independent	Keith Loadman	462	86.2	
Independent	Bernard Borman	74	13.8	
Majority		388	72.4	
Turnout		536	48.4	
Independent hold		Swing		

Melsonby
Party	Candidate	Votes	%	±%
Conservative	Jimmy Wilson-Petch	171	34.9	+34.9
Liberal Democrats	Celia Catesby	165	33.7	+33.7
Independent	Tim Place	154	31.4	−25.1
Majority		6	1.2	
Turnout		490	43.9	+6.5
Conservative gain from Independent		Swing		

Middleham
Party	Candidate	Votes	%	±%
Conservative	Roger Harrison-Topham	330	75.5	
Liberal Democrats	Gillian Wilson	107	24.5	
Majority		223	51.0	
Turnout		437	41.8	
Conservative hold		Swing		

Middleton Tyas
Party	Candidate	Votes	%	±%
Conservative	Jill McMullon	unopposed		
Conservative hold		Swing		

Newsham with Eppleby
Party	Candidate	Votes	%	±%
Conservative	Hamish Newhouse	unopposed		
Conservative gain from Independent		Swing		

Penhill
Party	Candidate	Votes	%	±%
Conservative	Howard Thomas	unopposed		
Conservative hold		Swing		

Reeth and Arkengarthdale
Party	Candidate	Votes	%	±%
Independent	Martin Bearpark	unopposed		
Independent hold		Swing		

Richmond Central (2 seats)
Party	Candidate	Votes	%	±%
Liberal Democrats	John Robinson	493		
Liberal Democrats	Clive World	480		
Conservative	David Johnson	465		
Turnout		1,438	41.0	+0.9
Liberal Democrats hold		Swing		
Liberal Democrats hold		Swing		

Richmond East (2 seats)
Party	Candidate	Votes	%	±%
Independent	Russell Lord	649		
Liberal Democrats	John Harris	560		
Independent	Tom Burrows	487		
Turnout		1,696	49.4	+3.8
Independent hold		Swing		
Liberal Democrats hold		Swing		

Richmond West (2 seats)
Party	Candidate	Votes	%	±%
Liberal Democrats	Stuart Parsons	707		
Liberal Democrats	Linda Curran	671		
Conservative	Clare Grainger	242		
Turnout		1,620	41.9	
Liberal Democrats hold		Swing		
Liberal Democrats hold		Swing		

Scotton (2 seats)
Party	Candidate	Votes	%	±%
Independent	Mark Bradbury	245		
Independent	Ken Lambert	189		
Independent	Malcolm Spark	161		
Turnout		595	20.4	+2.6
Independent hold		Swing		
Independent hold		Swing		

Swaledale
Party	Candidate	Votes	%	±%
Independent	Raymond Alderson	342	78.1	+51.1
Independent	Patricia Whelan	96	21.9	+21.9
Majority		246	56.2	
Turnout		438	46.1	−0.5
Independent hold		Swing		

== By-elections between 2007 and 2011 ==
=== Newsham with Eppleby ===
A by-election took place in Newsham with Eppleby on 7 August 2008 after the resignation of Conservative councillor Hamish Newhouse. The seat was held for the Conservatives by Mick Griffiths with a majority of 165 votes over Liberal Democrat Amanda Adams.

Newsham with Eppleby by-election 7 August 2008
Party	Candidate	Votes	%	±%
Conservative	Mick Griffiths	295	59.4	
Liberal Democrats	Amanda Adams	130	26.2	
Independent	Tim Place	72	14.5	
Majority		165	33.2	
Turnout		497	46.8	
Conservative hold		Swing		

=== Hipswell ===
A by-election was held in Hipswell on 15 October 2009 after the resignation of Conservative councillor Alicia Tye. The seat was held for the Conservatives by Stephanie Todd with a majority of 18 votes over Liberal Democrat Ann Bagley.

Hipswell by-election 15 October 2009
Party	Candidate	Votes	%	±%
Conservative	Stephanie Todd	144	39.0	+1.2
Liberal Democrats	Ann Bagley	126	34.1	+8.9
Independent	Kim Menham	99	26.8	−10.1
Majority		18	4.9	
Turnout		369	12.5	−10.5
Conservative hold		Swing		

=== Middleham ===
A by-election was held in Middleham on 15 October 2009 after the resignation of Conservative councillor Roger Harrison-Topham. The seat was held for the Conservatives by Rachel Allen with a majority of 210 votes over Liberal Democrat Gina Ramsbottom.

Middleham by-election 15 October 2009
Party	Candidate	Votes	%	±%
Conservative	Rachel Allen	253	85.5	+10.0
Liberal Democrats	Gina Ramsbottom	43	14.5	−10.0
Majority		210	70.9	+19.9
Turnout		296	27.9	−13.9
Conservative hold		Swing		
