= 2019 Richmondshire District Council election =

2019 UK local government election

Map of the results

The 2019 Richmondshire District Council election took place on 2 May 2019 to elect members of Richmondshire District Council in England. This was on the same day as other local elections. At the election, the Conservatives lost control of the council.

== Ward results ==
=== Catterick and Brompton-on-Swale ===
Catterick and Brompton-on-Swale
Party	Candidate	Votes	%	±%
Independent	Paul Spencer	677	48.0	
Conservative	Ian Threlfall*	616	43.7	
Independent	Leslie Rowe	599	42.5	
Conservative	Stephen Wyrill	510	36.1	
Conservative	Richard Heylings	406	28.8	
Majority		17	1.2	
Turnout		1,431	29.6	
Independent win (new seat)				
Conservative win (new seat)				
Independent win (new seat)				

=== Colburn ===
Colburn
Party	Candidate	Votes	%	±%
Independent	Angie Dale*	392	58.4	
Green	Kevin Foster	307	45.8	
Conservative	Bill Glover*	228	34.0	
Conservative	Jane Wyrill	74	11.0	
Majority		79	11.8	
Turnout		682	24.8	
Independent win (new seat)				
Green win (new seat)				

=== Croft and Middleton Tyas ===
Croft and Middleton Tyas
Party	Candidate	Votes	%	±%
Conservative	Angus Thompson*	535	44.0	
Conservative	Campbell Dawson*	522	42.9	
Liberal Democrats	Jane Parlour	400	32.9	
Independent	Bev Partridge*	285	23.4	
Liberal Democrats	Harold Millar	265	21.8	
Labour	Ken Smith	122	10.0	
Majority		122	10.0	
Turnout		1,222	42.1	
Conservative win (new seat)				
Conservative win (new seat)				

=== Gilling West ===
Gilling West
Party	Candidate	Votes	%	±%
Independent	William Heslop*	440	64.9	
Conservative	Jamie Cameron*	238	35.1	
Majority		202	29.8	
Turnout		688	39.6	
Independent win (new seat)				

=== Hawes, High Abbotside and Upper Swaledale ===
Hawes, High Abbotside and Upper Swaledale
Party	Candidate	Votes	%	±%
Independent	John Blackie*	709	84.7	
Conservative	Pat Kirkbride	128	15.3	
Majority		581	69.4	
Turnout		843	55.1	
Independent win (new seat)				

=== Hipswell ===
Hipswell
Party	Candidate	Votes	%	±%
Independent	Paul Cullen*	326	63.8	
Conservative	Lawrence Grose*	192	37.6	
Conservative	Richard Blows*	167	32.7	
Majority		25	4.9	
Turnout		515	17.0	
Independent win (new seat)				
Conservative win (new seat)				

=== Leyburn ===
Leyburn
Party	Candidate	Votes	%	±%
Independent	John Amsden*	742	60.3	
Conservative	Karin Sedgwick*	579	47.1	
Conservative	Tony Duff*	385	31.3	
Labour	Marian Knowles	252	20.5	
Majority		194	15.8	
Turnout		1,237	39.7	
Independent win (new seat)				
Conservative win (new seat)				

=== Lower Swaledale and Arkengarthdale ===
Lower Swaledale and Arkengarthdale
Party	Candidate	Votes	%	±%
Liberal Democrats	Richard Good	316	46.9	
Conservative	Ian Scott	236	35.0	
Green	Robbie Kelly	81	12.0	
Labour	David Dixon	41	6.1	
Majority		80	11.9	
Turnout		675	47.1	
Liberal Democrats win (new seat)				

=== Lower Wensleydale ===
Lower Wensleydale
Party	Candidate	Votes	%	±%
Conservative	Richard Ormston*	335	57.9	
Green	Lisle Ryder	244	42.1	
Majority		91	15.8	
Turnout		588	39.4	
Conservative win (new seat)				

=== Melsonby ===
Melsonby
Party	Candidate	Votes	%	±%
Conservative	Jimmy Wilson-Petch*	364	67.4	
Liberal Democrats	Philip Knowles	176	32.6	
Majority		188	34.8	
Turnout		550	34.6	
Conservative win (new seat)				

=== Middleham ===
Middleham
Party	Candidate	Votes	%	±%
Conservative	Susan Fairhurst*	406	79.1	
Labour	Nigel Hopper	107	20.9	
Majority		299	58.2	
Turnout		529	35.5	
Conservative win (new seat)				

=== Richmond East ===
Richmond East
Party	Candidate	Votes	%	±%
Liberal Democrats	Philip Wicks	408	60.5	
Conservative	Hazel Leah	266	39.5	
Majority		142	21.0	
Turnout		708	43.3	
Liberal Democrats win (new seat)				

=== Richmond North ===
Richmond North
Party	Candidate	Votes	%	±%
Independent	Lorraine Hodgson	274	51.2	
Conservative	David Johnson	161	30.1	
Green	Anna Jackson	58	10.8	
Labour	Gill Page	42	7.9	
Majority		113	21.1	
Turnout		536	33.1	
Independent win (new seat)				

=== Richmond West ===
Richmond West
Party	Candidate	Votes	%	±%
Independent	Stuart Parsons*	703	54.8	
Liberal Democrats	Clive World*	592	46.2	
Liberal Democrats	Jo Foster	350	27.3	
Green	Dave Dalton	275	21.5	
Conservative	Muriel Blythman	200	15.6	
Conservative	Alexander Grose	181	14.1	
Majority		242	18.9	
Turnout		1,297	39.6	
Independent win (new seat)				
Liberal Democrats win (new seat)				

=== Scotton ===
Scotton
Party	Candidate	Votes	%	±%
Independent	Helen Grant*	434	52.8	
Conservative	Pat Middlemiss*	335	40.8	
Conservative	Geoffrey Linehan*	281	34.2	
UKIP	Martin Smith	214	26.0	
Labour	Mark Smith	123	15.0	
Majority		54	6.6	
Turnout		826	28.5	
Independent win (new seat)				
Conservative win (new seat)				

=== Yoredale ===
Yoredale
Party	Candidate	Votes	%	±%
Conservative	Yvonne Peacock*	578	80.7	
Labour	Hugo Radice	138	19.3	
Majority		440	61.4	
Turnout		743	47.4	
Conservative win (new seat)				

== Changes 2019–2023 ==
- By October 2020, Kevin Foster was recorded as a Green Party and Independent councillor, having left the Richmondshire Together alliance; by January 2022, Pat Middlemiss was recorded as a member of Richmondshire Together after leaving the Conservative group.
- On 20 October 2021, Campbell Dawson left the Conservative group and joined Richmondshire Together.
- On 1 April 2023, Richmondshire District Council was abolished and its functions transferred to North Yorkshire Council.

== By-elections ==
=== Hawes, High Abbotside and Upper Swaledale ===
Hawes, High Abbotside and Upper Swaledale by-election, 17 October 2019
Party	Candidate	Votes	%	±%
Independent	Jill McMullon	409	58.7	
Conservative	Pat Kirkbride	231	33.1	
Green	Margaret Lowndes	57	8.2	
Majority		178	25.5	
Turnout		697		
Independent gain from Independent		Swing		

The by-election followed the death of independent councillor John Blackie in July 2019. Blackie had been elected in 2019 to represent Hawes, High Abbotside and Upper Swaledale ward.
