= 2015 Richmondshire District Council election =

2015 UK local government election

Map of the results

The 2015 Richmondshire District Council election took place on 7 May 2015 to elect members of the Richmondshire District Council in England. It was held on the same day as other local elections.
