= 1999 Richmondshire District Council election =

1999 UK local government election

The 1999 Richmondshire District Council election took place on 6 May 1999 to elect members of Richmondshire District Council in North Yorkshire, England. The whole council was up for election and independents lost overall control of the council to no overall control.

== Election result ==
Overall turnout at the election was 40.22%, down from 44.59% in 1995.

Richmondshire local election result 1999
Party	Seats	Gains	Losses	Net gain/loss	Seats %	Votes %	Votes	+/−
Independent	17			-3	50.0	19.9	2,137	
Liberal Democrats	9			+1	26.5	43.6	4,687	
Conservative	6			+3	17.6	28.5	3,061	
SDP	2			+1	5.9	8.0	862	

== Ward results ==
Askrigg
Party	Candidate	Votes	%	±%
Conservative	Yvonne Peacock	318	66.3	
Independent	John Abraham	162	33.8	
Majority		156	32.5	
Turnout		480	60.9	

Aysgarth
Party	Candidate	Votes	%	±%
Independent	Colin Bailey	376	84.7	
Liberal Democrats	John Mason	68	15.3	
Majority		308	69.4	
Turnout		444	50.1	

Barton
Party	Candidate	Votes	%	±%
Independent	Campbell Dawson	unopposed		

Bolton Manor
Party	Candidate	Votes	%	±%
Liberal Democrats	Nigel Watson	297	68.6	
Conservative	Michael Childs	136	31.4	
Majority		161	37.2	
Turnout		433	52.9	

Catterick with Tunstall (2 seats)
Party	Candidate	Votes	%	±%
SDP	Tony Pelton	452		
SDP	Brian Smith	332		
Conservative	Penelope Scott-Priestley	282		
Independent	Rose Heaton	259		
Liberal Democrats	Anne Simpson	82		
Liberal Democrats	Sheila Harrisson	82		
Turnout		1,489	37.7	

Colburn (3 seats)
Party	Candidate	Votes	%	±%
Independent	Helen Grant	unopposed		
Independent	John Lacey	unopposed		
Independent	Lynn Miller	unopposed		

Croft on Tees
Party	Candidate	Votes	%	±%
Liberal Democrats	Jane Parlour	200	67.3	
Conservative	John Mason	97	32.7	
Majority		103	34.7	
Turnout		297	51.9	

Grinton and Upper Swaledale
Party	Candidate	Votes	%	±%
Conservative	Raymond Alderson	unopposed		

Hawes and High Abbotside
Party	Candidate	Votes	%	±%
Independent	John Blackie	unopposed		

Hipswell (2 seats)
Party	Candidate	Votes	%	±%
Liberal Democrats	Ann Bagley	140		
Liberal Democrats	Richard Good	103		
SDP	Betty Robertson	78		
Turnout		321	13.2	

Kirkby Hill
Party	Candidate	Votes	%	±%
Independent	Michael Graham	unopposed		

Leyburn (2 seats)
Party	Candidate	Votes	%	±%
Liberal Democrats	Thomas Forth	488		
Liberal Democrats	Terence Jones	442		
Conservative	Valerie Pringle	357		
Turnout		1,287	42.8	

Lower Dale
Party	Candidate	Votes	%	±%
Independent	Richard Dunn	218	57.2	
Conservative	Muriel Blythman	163	42.8	
Majority		55	14.4	
Turnout		381	38.4	

Lower Swaledale
Party	Candidate	Votes	%	±%
Independent	Paul Cullen	unopposed		

Middleham and Coverdale
Party	Candidate	Votes	%	±%
Conservative	Andrea Robson	371	66.5	
Liberal Democrats	Frances Ramsbottom	187	33.5	
Majority		184	33.0	
Turnout		558	44.9	

Reeth
Party	Candidate	Votes	%	±%
Independent	Oswin Kendall	unopposed		

Richmond Central
Party	Candidate	Votes	%	±%
Liberal Democrats	Clive World	354	55.6	
Conservative	David Johnson	283	44.4	
Majority		71	11.1	
Turnout		637	40.6	

Richmond East (3 seats)
Party	Candidate	Votes	%	±%
Liberal Democrats	Grace Buckle	713		
Independent	Katherine Carr	596		
Liberal Democrats	John Harris	584		
Conservative	Oliver Blease	563		
Liberal Democrats	Catherine Frizell	451		
Turnout		2,907	38.4	

Richmond West (2 seats)
Party	Candidate	Votes	%	±%
Independent	Jane Metcalfe	366		
Conservative	Alison Appleton	239		
Independent	Gordon Golding	160		
Liberal Democrats	Sara Bell	142		
Liberal Democrats	Stuart Parsons	140		
Turnout		1,047	35.4	

Scorton
Party	Candidate	Votes	%	±%
Conservative	Michael Heseltine	unopposed		

Scotton
Party	Candidate	Votes	%	±%
Independent	Patricia Middlemiss	unopposed		

St Agathas
Party	Candidate	Votes	%	±%
Independent	Sylvia Golding	unopposed		

St Michael with St Luke
Party	Candidate	Votes	%	±%
Independent	William Corps	unopposed		

Stanwick
Party	Candidate	Votes	%	±%
Independent	John Gill	unopposed		

Swaleside
Party	Candidate	Votes	%	±%
Independent	James Fryer	unopposed		

Urevale
Party	Candidate	Votes	%	±%
Conservative	Keith Loadman	252	54.1	
Liberal Democrats	Gerald Hodgson	214	45.9	
Majority		38	8.2	
Turnout		466	48.9	

== By-elections between 1999 and 2003 ==
=== Colburn ===
A by-election was held in Colburn on 9 September 1999 after the resignation of independent councillor John Lacey. The seat was won by independent candidate Peter Wood with a majority of 49 votes over Hospital Campaign candidate Peter Fowler.

Colburn by-election 9 September 1999
Party	Candidate	Votes	%	±%
Independent	Peter Wood	176	31.6	
Hospital Closure Candidate	Peter Fowler	127	22.8	
Conservative	William Glover	125	22.4	
Independent	Helen Lerigo	105	18.9	
Hospital Closure Candidate	Thomas Henry	24	4.3	
Majority		49	8.8	
Turnout		557		
Independent hold		Swing		

=== St Michael with St Luke ===
A by-election was held in St Michael with St Luke on 22 February 2001 after the death of independent councillor William Corps. The seat was won by independent candidate Kenneth Smith with a majority of 36 votes over Conservative Michael Godwin.

St Michael with St Luke by-election 22 February 2001
Party	Candidate	Votes	%	±%
Independent	Kenneth Smith	211	41.9	
Conservative	Michael Godwin	175	34.8	
Liberal Democrats	Peter Barnett	117	23.3	
Majority		36	7.2	
Turnout		503	44.7	
Independent hold		Swing		

=== Middleham and Coverdale ===
A by-election was held in Middleham and Coverdale on 7 June 2001 after the resignation of Conservative councillor Andrea Robson. The seat was held for the Conservatives by Derek Jarvill with a majority of 373 votes over Liberal Democrat John Weedon.

Middleham and Coverdale by-election 7 June 2001
Party	Candidate	Votes	%	±%
Conservative	Derek Jarvill	599	68.4	+1.9
Liberal Democrats	John Weedon	226	25.8	−7.7
Independent	Bernard Borman	51	5.8	+5.8
Majority		373	42.6	+9.6
Turnout		876		
Conservative hold		Swing		

=== Catterick with Tunstall ===
A by-election was held in Catterick with Tunstall on 30 August 2001 after the resignation of Social Democrat councillor Brian Smith. The seat was gained for the Liberal Democrats by Patrick Brennan with a majority of 41 votes over Conservative Melva Steckles.

Catterick with Tunstall by-election 30 August 2001
Party	Candidate	Votes	%	±%
Liberal Democrats	Patrick Brennan	285	42.9	+35.3
Conservative	Melva Steckles	244	36.7	+11.7
Independent	Dorothy Ross	135	20.3	−3.1
Majority		41	6.2	
Turnout		664	29.4	−8.3
Liberal Democrats gain from SDP		Swing		

=== Leyburn ===
A by-election was held in Leyburn on 25 October 2001 after the resignation of Liberal Democrat councillor Thomas Forth. The seat was gained for the Conservatives by Wendy Morton with a majority of 4 votes over Liberal Democrat John Weedon after a recount.

Leyburn by-election 25 October 2001
Party	Candidate	Votes	%	±%
Conservative	Wendy Morton	295	50.3	+8.1
Liberal Democrats	John Weedon	291	49.7	−8.1
Majority		4	0.7	
Turnout		586	32.2	−10.6
Conservative gain from Liberal Democrats		Swing		
