= Fleur Butler =

Conservative politician and novelist

Fleur Josephine Butler OBE (born 24 April 1967) is an English Conservative politician and novelist. A former member of the Congress of the Council of Europe and leader of Richmondshire District Council, she is president of the National Conservative Convention and a past chairman of the Conservative Women's Organisation.

== Early life ==
Born in 1967, a daughter of the Hon. Samuel James Butler and his wife Lucilla Blanche Borthwick, Butler is also a granddaughter of the Conservative politician Rab Butler. She has two brothers and four sisters.

She was educated at the School of Oriental and African Studies of the University of London and then at Newcastle University.

== Political career ==
In 2007, Butler was elected as a Conservative to Richmondshire District Council in North Yorkshire, representing Leyburn, and was re-elected in 2011. From 2009 to 2011 she was Leader of the council and in 2012 was leader of its Conservative group. In 2015 she stood in Richmond West and lost to two independents.

At the European Parliament elections of 2009, Butler was an unsuccessful Conservative party list candidate in Yorkshire and the Humber.

In 2010, Butler was appointed to the Local Chamber of the Congress of the Council of Europe and was re-appointed in 2014. She took part in Congress election observation missions in Bulgaria in October 2011, in Armenia in September 2012, and in Georgia in June 2014.

From 2007 to 2015, Butler was an appointed member of the Yorkshire Energy Partnership and served as its chairman.

In 2017, Butler wrote in The Independent of the Conservative Party's "problem with feminism", insisting that it had an imbalance between men and women in the ranks of members of parliament and councillors which needed to change. She also complained of "a shocking shortfall of 12,000 women councillors needed across all parties".

In 2019, she was elected as national chairman of the Conservative Women's Organisation and in 2022 as president of the National Conservative Convention.

In October 2022, The Times ran an article about a call by Butler for older Conservative men in the House of Commons to make way for younger women.

== Personal life ==
On 8 December 1991, Butler married Richard Selwyn Sharpe, son of Canon Roger Sharpe and Mary Gordon Selwyn. They set up home in Exelby, North Yorkshire, and have four sons born between 1992 and 1999, including Jasper, Thomas and George.

Her novel Blue Murder: A Political Murder Mystery in the Yorkshire Dales was self-published in 2022.
