= Richmondshire District Council =

Defunct local authority in North Yorkshire, England

Richmondshire Council

Type
- Type: District Council

Leadership
- Leader of the Council: Angie Dale, Independent
- Deputy Leader of the Council: Helen Grant, Independent

Structure
- Seats: 24 councillors
- Political groups: Administration (13) Independent (10) Liberal Democrat (3) Opposition (11) Conservative (9) Green (1) Non aligned (1)

Elections
- Voting system: First past the post
- Last election: 2 May 2019

Website
- www.richmondshire.gov.uk

Richmondshire District Council was the administration body covering Richmondshire, a large area of the northern Yorkshire Dales including Swaledale and Arkengarthdale, Wensleydale and Coverdale, with Scots' Dyke and Scotch Corner at its centre.

The district was formed on 1 April 1974, under the Local Government Act 1972. It was a merger of the municipal borough of Richmond with the Aysgarth Rural District, Leyburn Rural District, Reeth Rural District and Richmond Rural District along with part of the Croft Rural District, all in the North Riding of Yorkshire. On 1 April 2023, the council was dissolved, its powers being taken over by the North Yorkshire Council.

== Political Control ==
=== 2003 to 2005 ===
The council was controlled by independent councillors until May 2003, when elections returned a council with no overall control (Conservative 11; Independent 9; Liberal Democrats 8; Richmondshire Independent Group 5; Social Democratic Party 1). Conservative councillor John Blackie was elected as leader of the council.

=== 2005 to 2019 ===
In December 2005, Blackie was replaced by the leader of the Independent Coalition for Richmondshire, Bill Glover, following the resignation of several councillors from the Conservative group and the merger of the rival independent groups. From 2009 to 2011, Fleur Butler, a Conservative, was Leader.

As of January 2019, the 34 member council was again controlled by a Conservative administration. The chairman was Bill Glover and the vice chairman was Stuart Parsons.

=== May 2019 ===
Following the local elections in May 2019 a new Independent-Liberal Democrat-Green coalition took power, under the umbrella name 'Richmond Together'.

This followed all up elections on new boundaries, which saw the Liberal Democrats gain two seats compared to their previous count of one seat and the Greens gain their first seat on Richmondshire Council. Together with nine of the Independent councillors, this gave the 'Richmond Together' coalition a working majority over the Conservatives and one stand-alone Independent in opposition.

=== May 2020 ===
The Green Party councillor, Kevin Foster, has since left the 'Richmond Together' alliance and formed a new group of two, alongside the stand-alone Independent, in opposition.

Meanwhile, the Conservative councillor Pat Middlemiss, who represents Scotton, has left the Conservative opposition group and joined 'Richmondshire Together' administration as an independent.

Overall, this increases the Independents within the 'Richmond Together' alliance to 10 seats, decreases the Conservatives to 9 seats and leaves the administration's working majority unchanged.

== Abolition ==
In July 2021, the Ministry of Housing, Communities and Local Government announced that in April 2023, the non-metropolitan county will be reorganised into a unitary authority. Richmondshire District Council will be abolished and its functions transferred to a new single authority for the non-metropolitan county of North Yorkshire.
