= Political career of Rab Butler (1941–1951) =

British politician (1902–1982)

The Right Honourable The Lord Butler of Saffron Walden KG CH PC DL
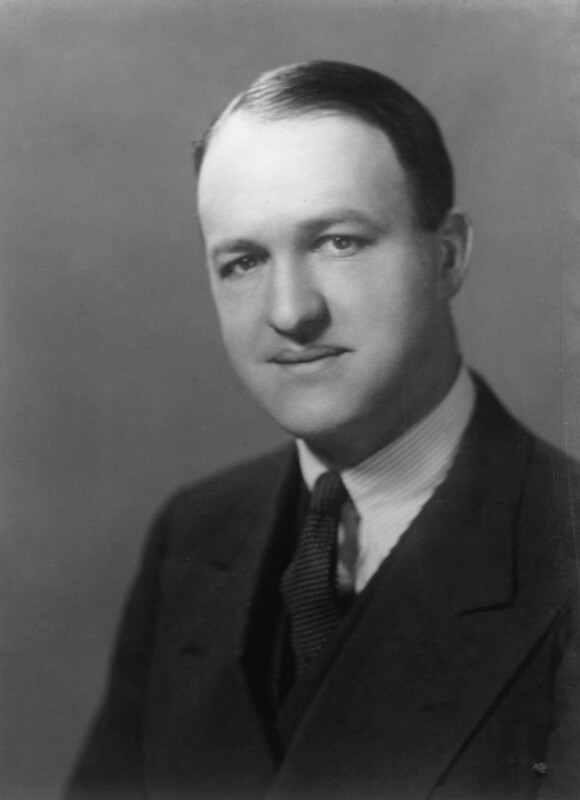
- Butler in 1934

Deputy Prime Minister of the United Kingdom
- In office 13 July 1962 – 18 October 1963
- Prime Minister: Harold Macmillan
- Preceded by: Anthony Eden (1955)
- Succeeded by: William Whitelaw (1979)

First Secretary of State
- In office 13 July 1962 – 18 October 1963
- Prime Minister: Harold Macmillan
- Preceded by: Position established
- Succeeded by: George Brown (1964)

Chancellor of the Exchequer
- In office 28 October 1951 – 20 December 1955
- Prime Minister: Winston Churchill; Anthony Eden
- Preceded by: Hugh Gaitskell
- Succeeded by: Harold Macmillan

Secretary of State for Foreign Affairs
- In office 20 October 1963 – 16 October 1964
- Prime Minister: Alec Douglas-Home
- Preceded by: Alec Douglas-Home
- Succeeded by: Patrick Gordon-Walker

Home Secretary
- In office 14 January 1957 – 13 July 1962
- Prime Minister: Harold Macmillan
- Preceded by: Gwilym Lloyd-George
- Succeeded by: Henry Brooke

Chairman of the Conservative Party
- In office 14 October 1959 – 9 October 1961
- Leader: Harold Macmillan
- Preceded by: The Viscount Hailsham
- Succeeded by: Iain Macleod

Leader of the House of Commons
- In office 20 December 1955 – 9 October 1961
- Prime Minister: Anthony Eden; Harold Macmillan
- Preceded by: Harry Crookshank
- Succeeded by: Iain Macleod

Father of the House
- In office 16 October 1964 – 19 February 1965
- Preceded by: Winston Churchill
- Succeeded by: Robin Turton

Lord Privy Seal
- In office 20 December 1955 – 14 October 1959
- Prime Minister: Anthony Eden; Harold Macmillan
- Preceded by: Harry Crookshank
- Succeeded by: The Viscount Hailsham

Minister of Labour and National Service
- In office 25 May 1945 – 26 July 1945
- Prime Minister: Winston Churchill
- Preceded by: Ernest Bevin
- Succeeded by: George Isaacs

Minister of Education President of the Board of Education (1941–44)
- In office 20 July 1941 – 25 May 1945
- Prime Minister: Winston Churchill
- Preceded by: Herwald Ramsbotham
- Succeeded by: Richard Law

Under Secretary of State for Foreign Affairs
- In office 25 February 1938 – 20 July 1941; Served with The Earl of Plymouth (1938–40)
- Prime Minister: Neville Chamberlain; Winston Churchill
- Sec. of State: The Viscount Halifax; Anthony Eden
- Preceded by: The Viscount Cranborne
- Succeeded by: Richard Law

Member of the House of Lords Lord Temporal
- In office 1965–1982; Life Peerage

Member of Parliament for Saffron Walden
- In office 30 May 1929 – 19 February 1965
- Preceded by: William Mitchell
- Succeeded by: Peter Kirk
Shadow Cabinet positions
Shadow Foreign Secretary
In office 16 October 1964 – 27 July 1965
Leader	Alec Douglas-Home
Shadowing	Patrick Gordon Walker; Michael Stewart
Preceded by	Patrick Gordon-Walker
Succeeded by	Reginald Maudling
Shadow Chancellor of the Exchequer
In office 10 December 1950 – 28 October 1951
Leader	Winston Churchill
Shadowing	Hugh Gaitskell
Preceded by	Oliver Stanley
Succeeded by	Hugh Gaitskell

Personal details
- Born: Richard Austen Butler; 9 December 1902 Attock Serai, British India (now Attock, Pakistan)
- Died: 8 March 1982 (aged 79) Great Yeldham, Essex, England, UK
- Party: Conservative
- Education: Pembroke College, Cambridge

Richard Austen Butler, Baron Butler of Saffron Walden (9 December 1902 – 8 March 1982), generally known as R. A. Butler and familiarly known from his initials as Rab, was a British Conservative Party politician.

From July 1941 to May 1945 Butler served as President of the Board of Education, his first Cabinet level post, although he was not a member of the small War Cabinet. His Education Act 1944 for England and Wales, widely known as "the Butler Act", helped reshape postwar society. It responded to wartime demands for a greater role for Christianity in state schools while at the same time resolving the decades-old controversy over state support for the cash-strapped church schools, an issue which had been unpopular with nonconformists who by the 1940s made up a powerful voice in the NUT. The Act absorbed most Anglican schools into the state system, while others, including Roman Catholic schools, received financial aid whilst remaining largely autonomous. Butler's role was to secure passage by negotiations with interested parties from Churchill, who was initially reluctant to bring in a major bill, to the churches, from educators to MPs. Butler helped to achieve a consensus among vested interests and opinion formers. Much of the framework remained intact until the 1988 Education Act. The Butler Act was the first of the enactments which brought in the postwar Welfare State and the only one for which the Conservatives could claim credit. The Act also resolved confusion over two other issues, by creating a clear divide between primary and secondary schools at age 11 and by raising the school leaving age to 15, with provision to raise it further to 16 (not implemented until 1971). In accordance with education doctrine of the time the Act left the door open for, but did not specifically prescribe, selection of children by aptitude at age 11. The recommendation of the Fleming Committee to provide state scholarship places at fee-paying public schools was not implemented.

During these years Butler nursed the unrequited ambition of being appointed Viceroy of India. He served as Minister of Labour in the short-lived Churchill caretaker ministry (May–July 1945), then narrowly held his seat at Saffron Walden on a split opposition vote in the Labour landslide of July 1945. In opposition he was chairman of the Conservative Research Department and played an important role in rebuilding the Conservative Party, including issuing a number of Charters (one of which was the Industrial Charter) outlining party policy and largely accepting many of the reforms of the Labour Government, thus helping to establish the postwar cross-party "consensus".

== Planning for postwar ==
Sir Douglas Hacking, chairman of the Conservative Research Department, had approached Butler to work for him in 1940. In May 1941 the General Director of the Conservative Party appointed him to the Conservative Party Post War Problems Central Committee (PWPC), a body responsible for drafting party policy proposals. Butler became Chairman of the PWPC on 24 July 1941; he was also the chair of the War Cabinet Committee for the Control of Official Histories. The PWPC had subcommittees to deal with demobilization, agriculture, industry and finance, education and social services, constitutional and administrative affairs, and national security.

Butler would later resign from the PWPC in July 1943 (he was replaced by David Maxwell-Fyfe) to concentrate on his education bill, taking up the post again in August 1944 after the bill had passed into law. He had little policy-making influence on Churchill or his cronies in the runup to the 1945 general election. Butler would later (in March 1949, after a great many postwar policy papers had been published) write that in the war years the PWPC had issued papers to keep up "the illusion that the Conservative Party was alive".

== Education Minister ==
=== Background ===
==== Education reforms before 1941 ====
England and Wales had a network of voluntary schools, most of them National Schools run by the Church of England, predating the state elementary schools set up under the Elementary Education Act 1870. The question of integrating church schools into the state system had bedeviled Balfour's Education Act 1902. H. A. L. Fisher had brought in another major Education Act 1918 but had not succeeded in integrating the church schools.

The Education Act 1918 promised compulsory part-time education from 14 to 18, but this was never implemented because of the Geddes Axe (spending cuts) of 1921. The Hadow Report of 1926, which recommended that the 11–14 age group should be hived off into separate senior elementary schools, was implemented very slowly because of the economic situation in the 1930s and had not been fully implemented at the start of World War Two. The Labour Party had promised Secondary Education For All in R. H. Tawney's 1922 work but did not have a majority in Parliament during their 1929-31 government to take on the vested interests of the churches. The Education Act 1936 was stymied by the churches, who blocked any further state control of the church schools, and by the Conservative Party agricultural lobby which ensured that the raising of the school leaving age to 15 was full of exceptions to allow teenagers to work on the land. The higher school leaving age was due to take effect by 1939 but the event was not implemented. The Spens Report, which was published in 1938 after five years of deliberation, and which called for the expansion of secondary education, was also not fully implemented.

==== Education in 1941 ====
Just under half of children attended an all-through elementary school from 5 to 14 (the school leaving age since the Education Act 1918). Most of the rest transferred at 11 to one of the senior elementary school set up under the Hadow Report of 1926. 80% of children left school at 14. Other children attended grammar school (fee-paying, with some scholarships), or fee-paying prep school to 13 then fee-paying public school. The number of grammar school pupils had increased from 337,000 in 1921 to 470,000 in 1938, but the number of entrants had only increased from 90,000 to 98,000 in that time – most of the increase in numbers was caused by children staying on for longer.

More than half the schools in the country were church schools, many of them small schools, and many of them in rural areas. However, Church of England schools now educated 20% of children, down from 40% in 1902. Many church schools were in a poor state of repair. An average of 70 Church schools were closing each year. Of the 10,553 voluntary schools, 9,683 were over forty years old; of the 731 schools on the "Black List" (i.e. in an unacceptably poor state of repair) 543 were voluntary schools.

The Nonconformists (also known as "Free Churches") had few schools of their own – Methodists had chosen to invest in teacher training at colleges such as Westminster College. They had objected to the subsidizing of Anglican and especially Roman Catholic schools ("Rome on the Rates") in the 1902 Act. Many non-Anglicans resented the "Single School Districts", mainly in rural areas, where the Church of England school was the only school, and to which parents had no option but to send their children. In the past the close relationship between the vicar and the local squire, whose family might well have paid for the school to be built, had often angered those lower down the social order who were less likely to be Anglicans. Butler later quoted with approval Élie Halévy's comments that English education consisted of "State Schools favoured by the Free Churches and free schools favoured by the State Church" and that rural schools were "built with the squire's money and taught the parson's catechism". Nonconformists tended to want church schools, especially in Single School Areas, to be nationalized and Cowper-Temple teaching (non-denominational religious teaching, required in state schools under the 1870 Forster Act) applied everywhere. However, they were committed to educational reform.

An "Agreed Syllabus" for Religious Education had been drawn up in Cambridgeshire in 1924 by a committee of teachers, Anglicans and nonconformists. By 1942 this was being used by over 100 LEAs. During the planning of the Butler Act Churchill referred to it the "County Council Creed" or even "Zoroastrianism", and once asked Butler if he intended to start a new state religion. Archbishop Temple derided the Agreed Syllabus as "Stoical Ethicism".

By the 1940s, the NUT wanted to keep the Cowper-Temple Clause in state schools, and a guarantee that teachers not be appointed on the basis of their religious belief, to prevent only teachers of a given religious denomination being hired in church schools. Like the Nonconformists, the TUC and NUT simply wanted Church of England schools brought under state control. The Association of Education Committees under Sir Percival Sharp also wanted Local Education Authorities to take control of church schools, although they were willing to allow teaching positions to be "reserved" for denominational teachers.

Roman Catholic schools educated 8% of children. The Catholic Church was actually in the worst financial state, and could not afford to bring schools up to standard. They also refused to abandon all-through schools (educating children from the age of 4 to 14) or to accept Hadow reorganization (i.e. hiving off the 11–14 age group into separate senior elementary schools), partly due to costs but also out of concern that the Catholic Church would therefore effectively lose control of children over the age of 11. The Catholic leader Cardinal Arthur Hinsley rejected the Agreed Syllabus altogether, thinking it "disembodied Christianity".

==== Religious education: the Five Points ====
Two million schoolchildren were evacuated from London and other cities in 1939–40, making people more aware of urban poverty and other social problems. William Temple, then Archbishop of York, was committed to building a "New Jerusalem", a new social order based on Christianity, and saw education reform as part of this. The Times had called for an increase in religious education (17 February 1940).

In June 1940 Cardinal Arthur Hinsley, leader of the English Catholic Church, had led a deputation to Herwald Ramsbotham, President of the Board of Education, to demand financial support for Catholic schools. Ramsbotham had acknowledged that in principle the Catholic schools needed help but had made no firm commitment, and had stressed that greater state control over their schools, which the Catholic hierarchy did not want, would be the quid pro quo.

On 13 February 1941 the Anglican Archbishops of Canterbury, York, and Wales issued the "Five Points", a statement on Christian education, from Lambeth Palace, after consultation with English and Welsh bishops and with the agreement of the (nonconformist) Free Churches. The Five Points were that (1) All children in all schools should receive a Christian education (2) Religious Education should be a recognized optional subject in training colleges (3) the statutory requirement that RE be the first or last lesson in the day be dropped (this had been a provision of the 1870 Forster Act to make it easier for parents who wished to withdraw their children to attend other religious instruction) (4) RE teaching was to be inspected by His Majesty's Inspectors (5) all schools were to start the day with an Act of Worship. They accepted the right of parents to withdraw children from RE teaching, and the Agreed Syllabus for Religious Education.

==== The Green Book ====
Ramsbotham spoke to the Lancashire NUT in Morecambe (reported in The Times on 17 March 1941). He wanted the school leaving age raised to 15, and thereafter to 16, as soon as possible, and day continuation classes up to the age of 18. All depended on how quickly schools could be repaired, which would mean competing with housing for building priorities.

Ramsbotham's department produced a set of proposals for reform, called "The Green Book" after its cover, in June 1941. The Green Book was supposedly confidential but was widely distributed among opinion formers, as Lester Smith put it, "in a blaze of secrecy", and was later used as the basis for talks with Local Education Authorities (LEAs) and teaching unions. Paragraph 137 of the Green Book proposed compensating for greater state control of church schools by partially lifting the 1870 Forster Act's ban on denominational instruction in state schools, to allow such teaching from the age of 11. Paradoxically this was not good enough for the churches, as the proposal for separate schools from the age of 11 would reduce their control over children aged 11–14, who up until that time had been educated in church schools. Butler later wrote in his memoirs that the Green Book failed on the issue of denominational teaching in state schools. Catholics rejected the Green Book out of hand. The Green Book was soon overshadowed by the Five Points, the Protestant Churches' proposals on Religious Education in state schools which had been issued in February.

Although many of Ramsbotham's proposals would later be incorporated into Butler's 1944 Act, Churchill at this stage did not favour major education reform and used the March speech as an excuse to remove him – he was sent to the House of Lords as a viscount.

=== 1941 ===
==== Butler's appointment as Education Minister ====
Churchill finally offered Butler the post of President of the Board of Education, his first Cabinet-level job (he did not become a member of the small War Cabinet), on 18 July 1941. His appointment was announced on 20 July 1941. Butler later implied that the appointment was intended as an insult (e.g. that Churchill had talked of "wiping babies' bottoms"). Some writers, such as Paul Addison, echo these claims and suggest that Churchill offered him an education, a backwater in wartime, or a diplomatic post to remove him from the more sensitive Foreign Office. However, Butler had been keen to leave the Foreign Office, and press stories that he had previously declined Cabinet positions were misinformed. Churchill told Butler on his appointment that his main job would be to supervise the movement of evacuated schoolchildren. Anthony Howard argues that the promotion was not intended as an insult. At the time, Butler recorded that Churchill had demanded more patriotic history teaching: "Tell the children that Wolfe won Quebec".

Butler proved to be one of the most radical reforming ministers on the home front. Butler had Benjamin Disraeli's book "Sybil – The Two Nations" in mind on his appointment.

Butler later wrote that he had an experience of negotiating with religious interests both in India and in Palestine, where he had helped Malcolm MacDonald draft his White Paper of 1939. Butler, who was privately educated and from a well-to-do family, initially had little knowledge of state elementary schools and relied on the guidance of his junior minister, James Chuter Ede. Chuter Ede was also a useful link to the Labour leaders Attlee, Arthur Greenwood and Ernest Bevin. Butler was known to be a practising Anglican, and Ede's background complemented his: he was a leading nonconformist and lay preacher, and had been an elementary school teacher and NUT activist (Ede was also governor of a Jesuit School, although that was less helpful). Both men also gained a reputation for integrity.

The Permanent Secretary (head civil servant) at the Board of Education was Sir Maurice Holmes and the Deputy Secretary was Sir Robert Wood.

==== Initial negotiations with the Anglicans ====
The evacuation of schoolchildren from cities at the start of the war had caused serious overstretch in rural schools, some of which were operating on a double shift system (i.e. educating more children than the normal capacity of the school by holding classes at different times). Butler claimed on 31 July 1941, shortly after his appointment, that 1% of children were receiving no education at all, but the true figure was higher and nearer 1 million.

Extensive lobbying had drummed up political support for the Church of England's position. By July 1941 224 MPs and peers had signed a declaration of principles similar to the Five Points recommending more religious teaching in state schools. One of Butler's first meetings was with the Archbishop about the Five Points. Butler pointed out that the Church had responsibility for RE teaching as well. The Anglicans were willing to compromise, unlike the Catholics. At meetings on 23 July and later they broadly accepted the Green Book's parameters – government cash in return for state control of Anglican schools, but they wanted a single-clause bill to implement the Five Points. Butler and Chuter Ede agreed to circulate the Five Points for discussion alongside the Green Book. Butler kept an appointment of Ramsbotham's to meet Church leaders including the two Anglican Archbishops Lang and Temple on 15 August 1941.

Butler wrote to Churchill on 12 September 1941 urging reform. Churchill did not want a new bill and replied (13 September) that "we cannot have party politics in wartime". He warned Butler not to "raise the 1902 controversy during the war", and not to speculate about what resources would be available after the war for the school building, preferring instead to concentrate on technical education for munitions and radio workers. Butler also suggested a Joint Select Committee (of Commons and Lords) consider a new bill, the same solution that had been adopted in 1933–4 to draw up the 1935 India Act. On 16–17 September 1941 Churchill and Attlee rejected Butler's proposal of a Joint Select Committee. Sir Maurice Holmes accepted Churchill's veto as absolute and wrote to Butler that he himself would not see the Promised Land but that Butler might. Butler later wrote that having seen the Promised Land, "I was damned if I was going to die in the Land of Moab. Basing myself on long experience of Churchill over the India Bill, I decided to disregard what he said and go straight ahead."

In October 1941, working with Food Minister Lord Woolton, Butler and Ede arranged for 3.5 million children to receive school milk and doubled the number receiving school lunch to 700,000. They also arranged for a committee under Cyril Norwood to report on secondary school exams (Norwood reported in June 1943).

In a written answer to the House of Commons (23 October 1941), Butler laid out the issues which were due for reform: raising the school leaving age, redefining elementary education, streaming by ability at age 11, part-time continuation schools for vocational and physical education up to age 18 and equality of opportunity for university entrance.

Cosmo Lang, Archbishop of Canterbury, Temple of York, the Catholic Cardinal Hinsley of Westminster, and Walter Armstrong, Moderator of the Free Church Federal Council, wrote to "The Times" on 21 December 1941 deploring "the failure of nations and peoples to carry out the laws of God". They also advocated the Five Principles which Pope Pius XII had urged for the ordering of International Life: an end to extreme inequality of wealth, equal opportunity for all children regardless of race or class, safeguarding of the family, restoration of the divine vocation to daily work, and the use of the resources of the earth, God's gift to the human race, for present and future generations. However, the views of different denominations differed a great deal in the detail.

=== 1942 ===
==== Chuter Ede and the White Memorandum ====
On 4 February 1942 Butler's junior minister James Chuter Ede, who had already grown to respect him, declined a proposal that he move to the Ministry of War Transport, although he would have obeyed a "direct order" from Churchill. Churchill deferred to Attlee's wish to keep Ede in place.

There was a five-day debate in Parliament on education in February 1942. Cosmo Lang, the outgoing Archbishop of Canterbury, spoke in the House of Lords, demanding the Five Points to increase religious teaching in state schools. Chuter Ede dissuaded him from bringing in a draft bill to satisfy the Church's demands, as it would prevent a general settlement with other denominations. Butler and Ede also felt that allowing such a single-clause bill to implement the Five Points might lose Church of England support for broader reform.

Chuter Ede's White Memorandum was published in March 1942, just before Easter. It reflected nonconformist lobbying since Ramsbotham's Green Book, and Chuter Ede's views and those of his officials. The Church of England had been relatively sympathetic to the "Green Book" (which had proposed permitting denominational teaching in state schools to children over the age of 11), but Anglicans were not pleased with the "White Memorandum" proposal for compulsory transfer of (church) schools in "single school areas" to LEA control, a move favoured by nonconformists. Temple succeeded the elderly Cosmo Lang as Archbishop of Canterbury on 1 April 1942.

Butler presented his plans to the NUT Conference on 9 April 1942: top priority was to be given to raising the school leaving age from 14 to 15 and then to 16. Children were to be streamed by ability and apprenticeships provided, and finally, the church-state divide was to be tackled.

==== Agreement with the Church of England ====
Butler had a meeting on 5 June 1942 with the National Society (the body of Church of England schools). Butler focussed on the physical condition of schools. Temple was won over in early June by Butler's stress on the poor state of Church school infrastructure.

The main option on the table was that Church schools be effectively taken over by the state: they could become "voluntary controlled" with the local education authority appointing a two-thirds majority on the school governing body. The LEA would appoint teachers and decide on the religious syllabus, which in practice meant accepting the Agreed Syllabus on Religious Education. Temple agreed that the majority of Anglican schools should accept this option, thinking it better for the Church of England and its schools to give up direct control over Religious Education and instead infiltrate the state system rather than fight a rearguard battle against state interference until defeated.

The other option was for Church schools to retain greater autonomy but to become "voluntary aided". These schools would receive a 50% grant towards improvements needed to meet the required standard for physical infrastructure, and the LEA would meet teachers' salaries and other running costs. VA schools still kept a majority of voluntary appointees on the governing body, and kept greater say over curriculum, staffing and admissions.

Some Anglican hardliners, e.g. Bishop AC Headlam, would have preferred the Scottish solution of generous state aid with little state control; this was also the preferred option of the Catholic Church. Temple agreed to persuade his flock to accept Butler's deal. Squaring the Church of England would keep the Tory Party happy with Butler's eventual bill.

==== Public schools and teacher training ====
In June 1942 Butler set up a committee into teacher training and recruitment, under the Vice-Chancellor of Liverpool University. Butler also brought in curriculum reform: current affairs of the USSR and USA, Physical Training, drama, music, and domestic science were to be studied.

Public (fee-paying) schools were blamed, in the mood of the time, for educating the leaders who had been responsible for British defeats of the early war years. Serious thought was given to integrating them into the state system. Butler was supportive, believing that standards would be raised in state schools if affluent and articulate parents were involved in the system. The Fleming Commission – Fleming was a Scot so was assumed not to be parti pris about English private schools – was assembled by Butler to consider the matter, but despite being announced in June 1942 it would not report until July 1944. Butler gave the matter a low priority until then as it was liable to consume too much time and effort.

With Churchill's leadership being questioned after recent war reverses, Ivor Bulmer-Thomas (14 August 1942) commented that some Conservative MPs saw Butler rather than Anthony Eden as a potential successor.

==== Negotiations with the Roman Catholics ====
Butler had less success in his dealings with the Roman Catholic Church. Roman Catholics were very reluctant to compromise, arguing that they already paid rates and taxes for the upkeep of state schools to which they could not send their own children. For the Catholic Church, school was an essential part of religious observance. Catholics accused officials of being opposed to the Catholic cause – Maurice Holmes described their attitude as "simply silly" in a note to Butler.

Butler met the elderly Cardinal Arthur Hinsley, head of the Roman Catholic Church in England, in August 1942. Hinsley urged the Scottish solution: generous state aid with little state control. Butler realized that this would be too expensive to sell to his Conservative colleagues, and that such subsidy to the Catholic schools would infuriate the Free Churches, LEAs and the NUT, and that Churchill would explode if there was any hint of a row about "Rome on the Rates", a slogan which had been used to campaign against the 1902 Education Act.

Butler presented himself at Southwark for talks (6 September 1942) with Peter Amigo, Archbishop of Southwark, who asked him "why he had come". Butler proposed that Catholic schools be eligible to receive 50% grants, the same as Voluntary Aided schools. Butler thought the Roman Catholic Church "hydra-headed" as he tried to find somebody with whom he could do business. On another occasion, Butler and Chuter Ede drove to the Northern Bishops' conference at Ushaw College, near Hexham. They were given dinner and shown the chapel but were given no concessions.

Butler was not able to have serious talks with Cardinal Hinsley until September 1942. He thought it better to present the Catholic Church with a fait accompli. On 15 September 1942, with Temple's prior approval, Butler told the Roman Catholic delegation that he had already reached an agreement with the Protestant churches. Butler put the Voluntary Aided and Voluntary Controlled options to the Catholics. VC status would have meant accepting the Agreed Syllabus for religious education, which the Catholic Church was never likely to accept. Butler suggested that VA status might work better, but the Catholics demanded 100% aid for physical infrastructure, not the 50% on offer (this would have left the Catholic schools with religious autonomy despite being almost entirely funded by the state). At meetings that autumn Butler and Chuter Ede urged Hinsley to take a more positive approach.

==== Nonconformists agree, Catholics continue to oppose ====
Now that the war was clearly moving in the Allies' favour, Butler found that his plans for an education bill gradually became attractive to senior ministers who wanted a cheaper alternative to implementing the Beveridge Report, whose publication was imminent. Kingsley Wood, Chancellor of the Exchequer, told Butler (16 September 1942) that he preferred to spend taxpayers' money on education rather than on other kinds of social reform. Kingsley Wood was keen to keep costs down (it was thought initially that only 500 of the 10,000 Church of England schools would choose the semi-autonomous Voluntary Aided status) and Butler claimed that on 14 September 1942 Wood told him that "he would rather give the money for education than throw it down the sink with Sir William Beveridge".

In early October 1942, Butler had to sell his scheme to the Nonconformist leaders of England and Wales. He received "a very formidable" Free Church deputation. Their main concern was that LEAs might dictate the choice of the headteacher. After two meetings chaired by the Anglican Archbishop Temple, the Free Churches agreed not to impede the bill. The NUT was concerned that, in Voluntary Aided Schools, teachers not of that school's denomination might suffer professional disadvantage; Butler promised them that this would be forbidden by a clause in the bill. The Free Church Federal Council, the Association of Education Committees and the NUT agreed to support Butler's proposals. In October 1942 Butler railed against the Conservative MPs on the 1922 Committee, who spent all their time in the Smoking Room drinking and intriguing. He thought them "a stupid lot".

Cardinal Hinsley wrote to The Times (2 November 1942) stressing US President Franklin Roosevelt's commitment to freedom of conscience. Hinsley also argued that Catholic schools should not be bullied by the state, as they often provided for the poorest inner-city communities. Churchill, still concerned at a repetition of the controversy which had surrounded the 1902 Education Act, telephoned Butler to tell him that "You are landing me in the biggest political row of the generation". Butler later embellished the story to claim that Churchill had sent him a mounted copy of the letter, with "There you are, fixed, old cock" scrawled across it. This ruined Butler's plans to bring in an education bill in 1943. The King's Speech (at the State Opening of Parliament) on 11 November 1942 contained only a brief reference to education and Butler believed that Churchill thought that he would fail.

==== Possible Viceroy of India ====
In late November 1942 Brendan Bracken sounded Butler out as a potential Viceroy of India (in succession to Lord Linlithgow; Eden had been offered the job by Churchill and was seriously considering accepting it). Butler toyed with the idea of allowing himself to be considered for the post. A handwritten letter declining appointment as Viceroy is to be found among Butler's papers, although it is unclear that any formal offer was ever made, or that any version of the letter was ever sent – his biographer Anthony Howard thought not. In the event Linlithgow stayed in post for another year until 1 October 1943 and Field Marshal Wavell was appointed.

Butler vainly lobbied John Anderson, Kingsley Wood and Ernest Bevin, senior ministers who managed the Home Front while Churchill concentrated on the war, to be allowed to present an education bill in 1943. Chuter Ede warned (27 November) that "something on account" was needed after memories of 1918, when promised postwar social reforms had not been forthcoming. Bevin had the Lord President's Committee give Butler permission to draft a bill. By the end of 1942, proposals for a White Paper (a statement of the government's plans, drawn up by civil servants) were proceeding through the Lord President's Committee. The Beveridge Report was debated by the Cabinet in November 1942 and published at the start of December, increasing the political will for an education bill as a cheaper alternative. Even Ernest Bevin wanted to know the what would be the ultimate cost of implementing the Report, whilst Churchill's confidant Lord Cherwell was concerned that the Americans, who were providing generous financial aid to the UK, would not want to be subsidizing socialism.

Butler helped to write King George VI's Christmas broadcast at the end of 1942.

=== 1943 ===
==== No agreement with the Catholics ====
Butler met Cardinal Hinsley again on 15 January 1943 and complained of the lack of progress in negotiations with the Catholic Church, which wanted to combine 100% state funding of infrastructure with religious autonomy. Butler prepared to consider an increase in aid grants from the 50% currently on offer to 75% to the new senior schools that were reorganized as planned under the 1936 Act.

Butler had a long talk (25 January 1943) with his Parliamentary Private Secretary "Chips" Channon about his chances of becoming Viceroy of India or Prime Minister. He had set a provisional deadline of Easter 1943 to present an education bill. Channon thought him "au fond a civil servant".

Archbishop Downey led a formal Roman Catholic deputation to see Butler on 3 February, but there was still no agreement. Butler visited Scotland, whose system of state funding of schools combined with religious autonomy was favoured by the Catholics. However, he found that over 50% of Scottish schoolteachers were subject to denominational tests, which in England and Wales would not be acceptable to the NUT, which had opposed such tests since that union had been founded in 1870. The Catholic hierarchy continued to be opposed to Butler's bill throughout its passage.

==== White Paper ====
By early 1943 the war had clearly turned in the Allies' favour, after the Battle of Stalingrad, Operation Torch and the Casablanca Conference. In March 1943, with Allied victory (sooner or later) looking increasingly likely, Churchill was now open to the idea of an education bill in 1944, as a social reform which would be cheaper than implementing the Beveridge Report.

On 4 March 1943 the bookmakers were quoting odds for the next Prime Minister as 2:1 for John Anderson, 5:1 for Oliver Stanley, and 10:1 for Butler. In April and May 1943 Butler arranged for Chuter Ede, who had not been able to complete his degree, to receive an honorary MA from Christ's College, Cambridge.

The White Paper, outlining the government's proposals for a bill, appeared on 16 July 1943. Church-State relations received very little attention, although all of the Church of England's Five Points for greater religious teaching in state schools were included. Educational doctrine of the time (reflected in Cyril Norwood's report of June 1943) favoured the Tripartite System, with children graded in the eleven plus exam, but the White Paper stated that the three types of secondary schooling could perfectly well be carried out on the same site or even in the same building.

John Anderson and Kingsley Wood were happy that the White Paper helped to distract attention from the Beveridge Report. Butler resigned from the Conservative Party Post War Problems Central Committee in July 1943 (he was replaced by David Maxwell-Fyfe) to concentrate on the upcoming education bill. He presented his plans for a bill to the House of Commons on 29 July, likening the existing education system to a schoolboy's jacket, now worn out, too small, shiny, patched and in need of replacement. Chuter Ede, in winding up the debate, noted that the only real criticism was for lack of progress in integrating the church schools and waiting for the Fleming Report on fee-paying schools.

==== Education bill ====
Archbishop Temple demanded in the House of Lords (4 August 1943) that even in controlled schools (i.e. schools which had been absorbed into the state system) the denominational teaching be given by a teacher approved by the school managers, that repair grants (presumably for the semi-autonomous aided schools) be increased from 50% to 75% and that the door be kept open for future denominational schools if 80–90% of the population in an area wanted them. Butler was initially concerned that Temple might ally with Hinsley and the Roman Catholics, whose demands were similar, but came to realize that Temple was in fact making demands to appease his own Anglican hardliners, so as to protect his position as their leader. Archbishop Temple obtained the concession that denominational teachers could be allowed in fully controlled schools if parents so wished. However, Butler and Sir Maurice Holmes refused to offer more than 50% for repair grants to Voluntary Aided schools, so as to force as many Anglican schools as possible to accept Voluntary Controlled status. Although in the end a majority of the 9,000 Anglican schools became fully funded and were absorbed into the state system, 3,000 of them accepted 50% Voluntary Aided status, not the 500 anticipated.

The resulting bill was produced to a civil service blueprint. In November 1943, Butler joined the Government Reconstruction Committee. James Stuart (Chief Whip) welcomed the publication of the bill in December 1943, as a way of keeping MPs happy without too much party strife. The First Reading was on 15 December 1943. The Bill was praised by Teachers' World on 29 December 1943.

=== 1944 ===
==== Unequal pay for women teachers and the Fleming Report ====
The Second Reading – a formal debate in the House of Commons – of the education bill began in January 1944. The Church of England hierarchy had already accepted the bill before it was presented to Parliament; the Church National Assembly voted to accept it as it was being passed.

Butler gave a speech to the 1922 Committee (Conservative backbenchers) on 2 February 1944. Chips Channon thought him a future Prime Minister, but Cuthbert Headlam thought (17 March 1944) that although Butler had more substance than Anthony Eden, Churchill's most likely successor, he was too worried "about making a false step". As late as 10 February 1944 Sir Alan Lascelles commented that "the Viceroyalty [of India] is clearly [Butler]'s ultimate goal".

At the Second Reading in March 1944, Thelma Cazalet-Keir, part of Quintin Hogg's Tory Reform Committee, proposed two amendments, one to raise the school leaving age to 16 by 1951 and one demanding equal pay for women teachers. The second amendment was passed by 117–116 on 29 March 1944. Butler, who thought it wrong to dictate to the teaching profession, stormed out of the Chamber and was rumoured to be about to resign. This was the only time the Coalition suffered a significant defeat in a division. Bevin and Chuter Ede threatened to resign if Butler was forced out, and Churchill made the amendment a matter of confidence and ensured its defeat by 425–23 on 30 March. This was one of the events which made Churchill and the Conservatives appear reactionary, contributing to their election defeat in 1945.

The Fleming Report on public schools finally appeared in July 1944. Butler had given the matter low priority until then; he also had not wanted to upset right-wing Conservatives, telling the Conservative Education Committee, who wanted to promote the interests of public schools, to shut up and wait for the Fleming Report. It recommended that a quarter of public school places be given to scholarships. In his memoirs (The Art of the Possible 1971, p120) Butler later wrote of the Fleming Report that "the first-class carriage had been shunted into an immense siding" and described its recommendations as "sensationally disingenuous", as many of the public schools had themselves advocated such a proposal just before the war to get more funding. Nothing came of the proposal, not least as the idea of spending ratepayers' money on a few bright pupils often did not meet with local authority approval. However, the Assisted Places Scheme of 1980–97 was partly inspired by the Fleming proposals.

The Education Bill received Royal Assent and became law on 10 August 1944. The bookmakers narrowed the odds on Butler being the next Prime Minister to 7:1 after the Act was passed. Churchill was keen to associate himself with a successful Act.

==== Details of the Butler Act ====
The Education Act 1944 (often known as the "Butler Act") brought in free secondary education – until then, many grammar schools charged for entry albeit with local authority assistance for poorer pupils in recent years. The Act also expanded nursery provision and raised the school leaving age to 15, with a commitment to raise it further to 16 (although this would not happen until 1972). The Church groups were satisfied as well. RE teaching became a statutory requirement for the first time. Butler saw the Act as merely "codifying existing practice". He later wrote that the 1944 Act, like those of 1870, 1902 and 1918, did not "sweep the board clean" but rather "established a financial framework" within which local authorities could conduct such policies as were appropriate for their region.

Educational doctrine of the time favoured the Tripartite System, with children graded in the eleven plus exam, although this was not specifically mentioned in the Act. Butler later wrote in his memoirs that the three types of education (grammar for clever children, technical and secondary modern for the rest) were intended to be "of equal standing". The Act did not specifically require three different types of school to be built, and the 1943 White Paper stated that the three types of secondary schooling could perfectly well be carried out on the same site or even in the same building, which in Butler's view "forecast the comprehensive idea". However, he deplored the way in which grammar schools became in subsequent decades "a political football through the obsessive insistence of the Labour Party on a doctrinal rather than an empirical approach".

In August 1944 Butler took up the Conservative Party Post War Problems Central Committee (from which he had resigned in July 1943) again but had little influence on Churchill or his cronies over policy-making for the next general election. The Tory Right such as Sir Herbert Williams had already denounced the PWPC as "pink socialism".

=== 1945 ===
With party politics restarting, Butler opposed the proposed nationalization of iron and steel on 9 April 1945. Like Churchill, Butler wanted the Coalition to continue until Japan had been defeated (an event then assumed to be a year or more away) and more social reforms had been passed. Butler advised Churchill, who was chairing a meeting in the Cabinet Room at Number 10, against an early election. Beaverbrook, addressing him as a "young man", warned him that he would not be offered a job in the new government if he spoke to the Prime Minister like that.

After the end of the European War in May 1945, the wartime coalition government came to an end. The magazines The Schoolmaster and Education praised Butler and mourned his departure from the Board of Education. Butler was Minister of Labour for two months in the Churchill caretaker ministry. His predecessor Ernest Bevin had told him that he too had wanted the Coalition to continue (Butler later noted in his 1971 memoirs that this was contrary to the recent claims of Bevin's biographer Alan Bullock – the 1940–45 volume of Bullock's work was published in 1967) and did not approve of Churchill calling a general election. Bevin was then so disgusted by Churchill's "Gestapo" speech that he refused to show Butler around the Ministry of Labour, simply calling for his hat and walking out.

Butler later wrote that the work of the Conservative Party Post War Problems Central Committee was swept away by the partisan atmosphere of the election. Herbert Morrison had already won the propaganda war at home and ABCA got the forces to vote out for Labour, or so Butler later argued. In the Labour landslide of July 1945 Butler held Saffron Walden narrowly, his majority falling to 1,158. His rival was the wartime mayor of Saffron Walden. He would probably not have held the seat if the Liberal candidate had not polled over 3,000 votes and split the opposition vote.

== Post-war ==
=== Principles of reform ===
After the Conservatives were defeated in the 1945 general election, Eden's supporters saw Butler ("the Rabbit") as the main threat to their man's succession to the leadership (Dick Law to Paul Emrys-Evans 25 Aug 1945). Historian Stuart Ball writes that Butler by his lack of military service and service at the Board of Education (the 1944 Act was the only piece of progressive legislation that the Tories could boast about) had "side-stepped the macho posturing that Churchill had imposed on all his other subordinates" during the war.

Butler emerged as the most prominent figure in the rebuilding of the party. Within a month of the election defeat, the Conservative Party Post War Problems Central Committee was reconstituted as the Advisory Committee on Policy and Political Education. Butler was initially opposed to detailed policy-making, not least as he felt the party was not yet pointing in the ideological direction he wanted.

Quintin Hogg wrote to Butler that the Conservatives needed a new Tamworth Manifesto. In a speech on 30 March 1946 Butler, who had been impressed by Herbert Morrison's policy-making for Labour, claimed that the Tories had lost in 1945 due to lack of any similar positive alternative. Butler rejected laissez-faire economics, accepted redistributive taxation, and argued that the State should balance competing interests and act as a trustee for the interests of the whole community. He called for a code of behaviour for industry and for laying down a quality standard for the consumer. Butler listed among his antecedents Bolingbroke, who argued that the State should act in the interests of the many, Edmund Burke, who thought the state should manage competing interests, Benjamin Disraeli for his concept of Two Nations and his father-in-law Samuel Courtauld who wrote in "Ideas and Industry".

=== Leadership intrigues ===
Churchill preferred high-flown generalities, like in his April 1946 Edinburgh speech, likened at the time to Disraeli's Crystal Palace and Manchester Free Trade Hall speeches of 1872, and not making hostages to fortune by detailed policy pledges. Churchill devoted his energies to international affairs, e.g. his 1946 speeches at Fulton, Missouri (the "Iron Curtain" speech) and Zurich (on European Unity). Churchill refused to agree to a detailed policy; this irritated Butler at the time but he later accepted that he had been wise.

Although Eden disliked him deeply, Harold Macmillan, who still cherished his 1930s reputation as progressive Conservative, was seen as an ally of Eden against Butler, since both men wanted to prevent the day when "the Rabbit will come into his predestined kingdom" (Dick Law to Emrys-Evans, some time in 1946).

In 1947 Macmillan gave only limited support to the Eden faction ("the Café Royal Group" which included Crookshank, Dick Law, Osbert Peake, Ralph Assheton, Maxwell-Fyfe, and a reluctant James Stuart) to push Churchill, who besides his foreign speeches had been spending a great deal of time abroad writing and painting, into retirement. Macmillan recommended that he be encouraged but not "shoved" into retiring. Stuart Ball believes that Macmillan did not want Eden to lose ground at Butler's expense, and that Butler could have ensured Churchill's retirement by making common cause with Eden. This did not happen, and Churchill remained leader.

=== CRD and CPC ===
Butler became Chairman of the Conservative Research Department, assisted by David Clarke, Michael Fraser and Peter Goldman (Butler later wrote that "whatever crisis arose, they never flapped simultaneously"). Neither Peter Goldman nor Michael Fraser had immediate political ambitions.

Butler believed that the job of the CRD was not to come up with original ideas but rather to keep an eye on other people's ideas, to make sure that the material for a manifesto was ready if an election was called. Butler believed that "policy cannot be made in a vacuum". The CRD provided secretaries for every party committee apart from the 1922 Committee, and briefed frontbenchers, backbenchers, candidates, and accredited speakers.

Clarke recruited three wartime officers – Reginald Maudling, Iain Macleod and Enoch Powell, all of whom had political ambitions – to his secretariat to brief the Parliamentary Party. Butler later wrote that Powell was the "most intellectually formidable" of the three and had "strong and pungently expressed views" only some of which were eccentric. All three would be elected to Parliament in 1950.

There was also an Advisory Committee on Policy and Political Education (ACPPE) and the newly reactivated Conservative Political Centre (CPC), which was run by Cub Alport as a sort of Tory version of the Fabian Society. Cub Alport had been a close friend of Butler's brother Jock, who had been killed in the war. Butler wrote that the CPC, which had been built up by Sir Robert Topping, enjoyed "a sort of dominion status" relative to Conservative Central Office. The CPC enabled party members to contribute to policy formation. Butler planned a series of CPC bookshops, although only the one in Victoria lasted long. Swinton College was set up (another was set up for the south but did not last, while a CPC summer school was planned in a university town).

=== Charters ===
After the 1946 Party Conference Churchill set up an Industrial Policy Committee chaired by Butler and consisting of Oliver Stanley, Oliver Lyttelton, Harold Macmillan, and David Maxwell Fyfe, as well as backbenchers David Eccles, Derek Heathcote Amory, Sir Peter Bennett, and Colonel Jim Hutchison.

In early 1947 Butler, Oliver Stanley, Oliver Lyttelton, Harold Macmillan, and David Maxwell-Fyfe toured the country – each taking responsibility for a geographic region – to discuss the plans with leading Conservative businessmen and trade unionists.

Butler asked David Clarke, author of "The Conservative Faith in the Modern Age", to write "The Case for Conservatism". Both appeared in 1947. In 1947, the Industrial Charter was produced, advocating full employment and acceptance of the welfare state (Butler himself said that those who advocated "creating pools of unemployment should be thrown into them and made to swim"). and was partly an attack on socialism and partly an attempt to seize the political centre ground. Butler compared it to Peel's Tamworth Manifesto. Churchill held a dinner at the Savoy and complimented the Charter to Butler, but never formally adopted it as party policy. It was published on 12 May 1947. It was praised loudly by every paper apart from the Labour Herald. The Tory right-winger Waldron Smithers thought Butler "pink".

Butler and Macmillan were the main reformers, but similar views were also held by Lord Cranborne, who wanted to turn "small men" into "stakeholders" in society and Eden who revived the 1920s slogan of "a property-owning democracy". Oliver Lyttelton was unusual among senior Conservatives in taking a more pro-business stance.

Between May 1947 and March 1949 Six "Charters" were published. The Agricultural Charter appeared in June 1948. In February 1949 "The Conservative Policy for Wales and Monmouthshire", almost entirely written by Enoch Powell and also published in Welsh, urged the appointment of a Minister for Wales. That same month "A True Balance" and a report on "Women's Questions" appeared, urging the abolition of Breach of Promise laws, and that a woman should have the right to know her husband's income and to sit in the House of Lords, proposals which were relatively radical for the time, and which mattered when the Conservatives were dependent on the women's vote. "Essays in Conservatism" appeared in March 1949 and a statement on Imperial Policy in June 1949. Iain Macleod was secretary to the team which wrote "Scottish Control of Scottish Affairs".

A massive rally of 5,000 Conservatives was held at Stanstead Hall (Butler's country home) on 23 July 1949, with Macmillan the main speaker. In July 1949 Butler wrote a foreword for "The Right Road for Britain" which became the basis for the Conservatives' February 1950 manifesto. "The Right Road for Britain" appeared in time for the London Conference. It was launched by Churchill in a speech at Wolverhampton, in which he praised Butler. By this time Butler was being publicly tipped as a potential party leader, although there were concerns that he was too openly clever. Beaverbrook and Woolton were his enemies whilst Cuthbert Headlam thought him a "don and an intellectual" and lacking in "personality".

=== 1950–51 ===
Butler had to intervene to stop Churchill from writing too much of the Conservatives' 1950 manifesto.

In 1950, Butler welcomed the "One Nation" pamphlet produced by new MPs including Iain Macleod, Angus Maude, Edward Heath and Enoch Powell. Cuthbert Headlam described Butler and Macmillan as "the pinkish portion" of the party (8 February 1951).

Butler had little input into the 1951 Conservative manifesto, which Churchill largely wrote himself.

Parliament of the United Kingdom
Preceded by William Mitchell	Member of Parliament for Saffron Walden; 1929–1965	Succeeded by Peter Kirk
Preceded by Winston Churchill	Father of the House; 1964–65	Succeeded by Robin Turton
Political offices
Preceded by The Marquess of Lothian	Under Secretary of State for India; 1932–37	Succeeded by The Lord Stanley
Preceded by Anthony Muirhead	Parliamentary Secretary to the Ministry of Labour; 1937–38	Succeeded by Alan Lennox-Boyd
Preceded by The Viscount Cranborne	Under Secretary of State for Foreign Affairs; 1938–41; Served alongside: The Earl of Plymouth (1938–40)	Succeeded by Richard Law
Preceded by Herwald Ramsbotham	President of the Board of Education; 1941–44	Succeeded by Himself as Minister of Education
Preceded by Himself as President of the Board of Education	Minister of Education; 1944–45	Succeeded by Richard Law
Preceded by Ernest Bevin	Minister of Labour and National Service; 1945	Succeeded by George Isaacs
Preceded by Oliver Stanley	Shadow Chancellor of the Exchequer; 1950–51	Succeeded by Hugh Gaitskell
Preceded by Hugh Gaitskell	Chancellor of the Exchequer; 1951–55	Succeeded by Harold Macmillan
Preceded by Harry Crookshank	Lord Privy Seal; 1955–59	Succeeded by The Viscount Hailsham
Preceded by Harry Crookshank	Leader of the House of Commons; 1955–61	Succeeded by Iain Macleod
Preceded by Gwilym Lloyd-George	Home Secretary; 1957–62	Succeeded by Henry Brooke
Vacant Title last held by Anthony Eden	Deputy Prime Minister of the United Kingdom; 1962–63	Vacant Title next held by Willie Whitelaw
New office	First Secretary of State; 1962–63	Vacant Title next held by George Brown
Preceded by Alec Douglas-Home	Secretary of State for Foreign Affairs; 1963–64	Succeeded by Patrick Gordon-Walker
Preceded by Patrick Gordon-Walker	Shadow Foreign Secretary; 1964–65	Succeeded by Reginald Maudling
Academic offices
Preceded by Tom Honeyman	Rector of the University of Glasgow; 1956–59	Succeeded by The Viscount Hailsham
Preceded by The Earl of Halifax	Chancellor of the University of Sheffield; 1959–77	Succeeded by Frederick Dainton
Preceded by The Lord Adrian	Master of Trinity College, Cambridge; 1965–78	Succeeded by Alan Hodgkin
New office	Chancellor of the University of Essex; 1966–82	Succeeded by Patrick Nairne
Party political offices
Preceded by The Viscount Hailsham	Chair of the Conservative Party; 1959–61	Succeeded by Iain Macleod
