= Varvara de Vesselitsky =

Pioneer woman social researcher

Varvara de Vesselitsky (1872 – 14 February 1927) was a pioneer social researcher who in the early 1900s undertook first-hand studies of the lives and conditions of working-class women in London.

== Early years ==
According to the 1921 Census, she was born in Saxony in Germany in 1872. Her father Gabriel de Wesselitsky came from St Petersburg; he was a prominent Russian diplomat and historian who fought in the Balkan wars and who travelled widely around Europe. The family later made their base in England in the 1890s, and she and her brother Sergei eventually became naturalised British citizens in March 1923. Her mother was an American citizen, and in 1908 Varvara de Vesselitsky was recorded as working as a teacher at Wolcott School for Girls in Denver, Colorado.

== Career at the London School of Economics ==
Varvara de Vesselitsky joined the London School of Economics (LSE) before the start of the First World War, studying two years for a Social Sciences Certificate, and graduating in 1913. With the support of Sidney and Beatrice Webb and George Bernard Shaw’s wife, Charlotte Shaw, a Department was being established there, with funding from the Ratan Tata Foundation in India, to carry out empirical research on the economics and sociology of work, women and the household.

Initially de Vesselitsky participated in a research project on the tailoring industry directed by the Socialist historian R.H.Tawney, and she worked jointly with the young Clement Attlee, who later became the UK's Prime Minister, to document the situation of homeworkers. Tawney credited chapter VI of the resultant book as being mainly her work. Subsequently, she personally undertook a series of studies including one in 1915 on women home-workers in the tailoring and box-making industries, and another on the wartime budgets of working-class families in London. She published monographs on both of these studies. She also carried out a first-hand study, jointly with Mildred Bulkley, of money-lending among the working-class. This was one of the first major studies of working-class money-lending, an area which is difficult to research.

== Research methodology ==
For the first of her own studies in 1915, she took substantial samples of women workers in East London (877 tailoresses and 330 boxmakers). They were visited for interviews often several times, so that de Vesselitsky could gain a detailed understanding of their individual situations. This detail complemented the statistical patterns in their circumstances that she identified. In modern social research terminology, she was one of the pioneers in adopting a research methodology that generated both ‘qualitative’ and ‘quantitative’ data. According to Ann Oakley, her work played a significant part in establishing the British tradition of empirical social science, oriented towards contemporary issues in social policy. This contrasted with the gentlemanly ‘armchair’ theorising of better-known predecessors.

== Later years ==
After the First World War, de Vesselitsky became secretary of the Stepney Skilled Employment Association, based at Toynbee Hall, so she continued to be active in the field of social policy. She also wrote a play entitled Up or Down?, under the name of “V. de V.”, about women’s experience of poverty, which was first performed at Toynbee Hall in 1926.

Varvara de Vesselitsky died in 1927, and was buried on the East Side in Highgate Cemetery, although there is no monument on her grave. Her contribution, like that of many other early women social researchers, was largely forgotten, eclipsed by the view that the founders of the social sciences were exclusively men.
