= William Temple (bishop) =

English archbishop (1881–1944)

The Most Reverend and Right Honourable William Temple
- Archbishop of Canterbury
- Church: Church of England
- Appointed: 1 April 1942 (nominated)
- Installed: 17 April 1942 (confirmed)
- Term ended: 26 October 1944 (his death)
- Predecessor: Cosmo Lang
- Successor: Geoffrey Fisher
- Previous posts: Archbishop of York (1929–1942); Bishop of Manchester (1921–1929)

Orders
- Ordination: 1909 (deacon), 1910 (priest) by Randall Davidson
- Consecration: 25 January 1921

Personal details
- Born: 15 October 1881 Exeter, England
- Died: 26 October 1944 (aged 63) Westgate-on-Sea, England
- Buried: Canterbury Cathedral
- Denomination: Anglicanism
- Parents: Frederick Temple (father)
- Spouse: Frances Gertrude Acland Anson (m. 1916)
- Education: Balliol College, Oxford

William Temple (15 October 1881 – 26 October 1944) was an English Anglican priest who served as Bishop of Manchester (1921–1929), Archbishop of York (1929–1942) and Archbishop of Canterbury (1942–1944).

The son of an Archbishop of Canterbury, Temple had a traditional education after which he was briefly a lecturer at the University of Oxford before becoming headmaster of Repton School from 1910 to 1914. After serving as a parish priest in London from 1914 to 1917 and as a canon of Westminster Abbey, he was appointed Bishop of Manchester in 1921. He worked for improved social conditions for workers and for closer ties with other Christian churches. Despite being a socialist, he was nominated by the Conservative government for the archbishopric of York in 1928 and took office the following year. In 1942 he was translated to the see of Canterbury, and died in post after two and a half years, aged 63.

Temple was admired and respected for his scholarly writing, his inspirational teaching and preaching, for his constant concern for those in need or under persecution, and for his willingness to stand up on their behalf to governments at home and abroad.

== Early years ==
Temple was born on 15 October 1881 in Exeter, Devon, the second son of Frederick Temple and his wife Beatrice, née Lascelles. Frederick Temple was Bishop of Exeter, and later (1896–1902) Archbishop of Canterbury. Despite the considerable age gap – the bishop was 59 years old when Temple was born (Beatrice Temple was 35) – they had a close relationship. Sixty years later Temple referred to his father as "among men the chief inspiration of my life". In a centenary appraisal Frederick Dillistone wrote:

Both parents came from aristocratic families and William's life, until he was 21, was spent in episcopal palaces. Yet it is clear that this privileged start did not spoil him, for there was no trace of snobbery or class-consciousness in his later years. Rather, there came to be an increasing concern for all who had not shared his circumstances.

After a preparatory school, Colet Court, Temple went to Rugby School (1894–1900), where his godfather, John Percival, was headmaster. Temple later wrote a biography of him. At Rugby, Temple began lifelong friendships with the future historian R. H. Tawney and J. L. Stocks, who became a philosopher and academic.

In 1900 Temple went up to Balliol College, Oxford, where he obtained a double first in classics and served as president of the Oxford Union. The master of Balliol was the philosopher Edward Caird; the biographer Adrian Hastings comments that Caird's neo-Hegelian idealism provided the philosophical inspiration for many of Temple's academic writings. Temple learned to search for a synthesis in apparently conflicting theories or ideals, and later wrote of "my habitual tendency to discover that everybody is quite right – but I was brought up by Caird and I can never get out of that habit". In Dillistone's view, Temple did not make "any radical distinction between Christianity and the World, the Church and the State, Theology and Philosophy, Religion and Culture".

While an undergraduate Temple developed a deep concern for social problems, involving himself in the work of the Oxford and Bermondsey Mission, which brought material and spiritual help to the poor of the East End of London. Another enduring interest that began in this period was his concern to make higher education available to intellectually able students from all social and economic backgrounds.

== Oxford and Repton: 1904–1914 ==
After taking his degree in 1904 Temple received numerous job offers – one biographer says as many as 30 – and he opted for a fellowship at Queen's College, Oxford, where he went into residence as fellow and lecturer in philosophy in October 1904, remaining there until 1910. According to Hastings his lectures were ostensibly on Plato's Republic but in reality were on his own mix of Greek and Christian themes. His tutorial duties were light, and he had leisure to visit mainland Europe and meet philosophers and theologians such as Rudolf Christoph Eucken, Hans Hinrich Wendt, Adolf von Harnack and Georg Simmel.

For as long as he could remember, Temple had aimed to be ordained, and in January 1906 he approached the Bishop of Oxford, Francis Paget, seeking admission to the diaconate. Paget declined, expressing regret that he could not ordain anyone with such theological views as those of Temple, who was hesitant about accepting the literal truth of the Virgin birth or the bodily resurrection of Christ. After further study, and guidance from the Oxford theologians Henry Scott Holland and Burnett Hillman Streeter, Temple felt ready to try again and in March 1908 he obtained an interview with his father's successor as Archbishop of Canterbury, Randall Davidson. After an exchange of letters between Davidson and Paget, the Archbishop made Temple a deacon on 20 December 1908 in Canterbury Cathedral, and ordained him priest on 19 December 1909.

In 1908 Temple became the first president of the newly formed Workers' Educational Association, a charity dedicated to making the best educational opportunities available to all. In 1910 he published his first book, The Faith and Modern Thought. The Athenaeum took issue with some of his contentions, but considered that writers like him demonstrated that "a fresh presentation of doctrine may be helpful to religion, and not injurious". The Saturday Review enjoyed the book's "vigorous and exuberant healthiness" and predicted, "Matured experience will enable the author to give the world some remarkable work".

In June 1910 Lionel Ford, the headmaster of Repton School, moved to the headship of Harrow, and Temple was appointed to succeed him at Repton. The biographer George Bell quotes a Repton colleague on Temple:

He was not really fitted, either by temperament or by taste, to be a great headmaster, as he probably soon discovered. He was never really interested in the administrative details of an educational institution, and he had too many wider interests in the outside world to settle down to them, but, both in chapel and in the classroom, and most of all perhaps in his familiar intercourse with the senior boys, he was a source of real inspiration to many at Repton. He made a host of life-long friends there, and his Repton years were among the happiest in a fundamentally happy life.

Temple shared his colleague's reservations about his suitability for the post; in late 1910, during his first term at Repton, he wrote "I doubt whether headmastering is really my line". On 1 January 1913 it was announced that he had been appointed vicar of St Margaret's, Westminster, a post that carried with it one of the canonries of the adjacent Westminster Abbey, but it then emerged that the Abbey statutes required all canons to have served at least six years in holy orders. Temple remained at Repton for another 18 months, and then accepted the benefice of St James's, Piccadilly in the West End of London. He was happy to be succeeded as headmaster by Geoffrey Fisher.

== Piccadilly and Westminster Abbey: 1914–1920 ==
The Piccadilly parish was undemanding, and left Temple free to write and to work on national issues during the early part of the First World War, especially for the National Mission of Repentance and Hope, an initiative designed to renew Christian faith nationwide. He served as editor of The Challenge, a non-party Church newspaper, which foundered after two and a half years. He was more successful with the Life and Liberty Movement, a campaign for a measure of independence for the Church of England, which was at that time wholly under the control of Parliament for its laws and rules. In 1916 he married Frances Gertrude Acland Anson (1890–1984). They had no children. The following year Temple gave up the rectorship of St James's to make himself free to tour the country campaigning for Life and Liberty. In the same year he completed his largest philosophical work, Mens Creatrix (The Creative Mind). In 1918 he joined the Labour Party, and remained a member for eight years.

Temple's appointment as a canon of Westminster in June 1919 further raised his public profile. The Abbey was crowded whenever he preached. Hastings writes that it was clear to Archbishop Davidson that so able and influential a man as Temple should be found a suitably important role. Towards the end of 1920, when Temple was 39, the Prime Minister, David Lloyd George, offered him the post of Bishop of Manchester.

== Bishop of Manchester: 1921–1929 ==
Temple was consecrated bishop at York Minster on 25 January 1921 and enthroned at Manchester Cathedral on 15 February. The Church Times later commented, "None of his friends doubted that if he would stick to his new job, and not be lured into a hundred-and-one other activities, he would make a big success". In the view of the same writer':

Throughout the seven years he ruled the diocese he was a true Father-in-God. Whatever tended to the promotion of the work of the Church had his support. Thus he accepted the presidency of the Anglo-Catholic Congress on the two occasions it was held in Manchester, and remained for years president of its diocesan committee.

Temple came as a sharp contrast with his predecessor, Edmund Knox. Knox had been staunchly evangelical and autocratic. He had refused to countenance the division of his over-large diocese; Temple saw that division was essential and founded the separate Diocese of Blackburn in 1926. Hastings comments that while "showing himself a thoroughly pastoral bishop, for whom parish visiting had a high priority", Temple had wider social and ecumenical agendas. Manchester was a better fit than Piccadilly for his social concerns. It gave him scope for his interest in industrial relations and how Christian philosophy could help improve them. In 1926, after the BBC vetoed Davidson's proposed broadcast to help mediate in the General Strike, Temple took a leading part with other bishops in trying to bridge the gulf between the miners and coal owners. He co-operated with other Christian bodies, and as a member of the Council of Christian Congregations in his diocese he took an active part in promoting measures of social improvement. He pursued a policy of inclusiveness among Christians, and invited several nonconformist ministers to preach in the Manchester diocese, which prompted the anti-ecumenical Bishop Weston of Zanzibar to withdraw in protest from the Lambeth Conference.

As well as social concerns, Temple played a role in humanitarian and religious concerns. He was a leading figure in missionary conferences, led missions to undergraduates at Cambridge, Oxford and Dublin, and revitalised the annual Blackpool Sands mission. In retrospect (1944) The Manchester Guardian expressed reservations about Temple as a diocesan bishop: "he was doing too many things outside his diocese … he was not really interested in humdrum details of administration". Nonetheless, The Church Times said, "No aspect of life in his diocese was without his touch, whether it were in college, factory, conference hall or theatre. And all the time the flow of books from his pen continued, most of the work being done in the odd snatches of time between interviews and engagements, which lesser men fritter away with a cigarette".

== Archbishop of York: 1929–1942 ==
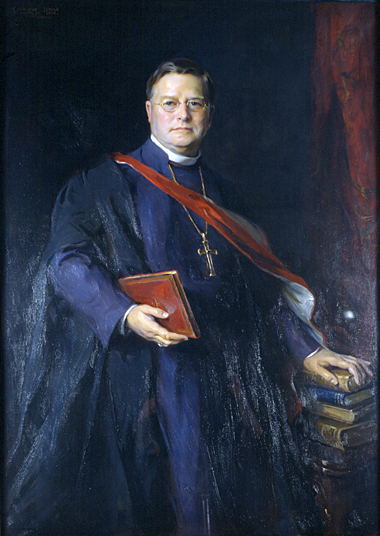
Portrait by Philip de László, 1942

In 1928 Davidson retired, succeeded at Canterbury by Lang, to whom Temple was widely seen as one of six likely successors. (Note: The others were the bishops of Chelmsford (Guy Warman), Durham (Hensley Henson), Liverpool (Albert David), Oxford (Thomas Strong) and Winchester (Theodore Woods).) He had support from all sections of the Church although there was some concern that the Prime Minister, Stanley Baldwin, a Conservative, would not nominate a prominent Labour supporter. Temple was appointed, and was enthroned at York Minster on 10 January 1929.

Hastings writes that Temple's thirteen years at York were "by far the most important and effective in his life". As Archbishop, Temple was in a position to exercise "the sort of national and international leadership for which he was naturally suited". Hastings gives examples ranging from local and national – preaching, lecturing, presiding in parishes, university missions, ecumenical gatherings and chairing the General Advisory Council of the BBC – to international – lecturing in American universities, speaking at the 1932 disarmament conference in Geneva and becoming the recognised leader of the international ecumenical movement. He was one of the instigators of the World Council of Churches as well as the British Council of Churches.

While Archbishop of York, in addition to his pastoral work Temple wrote what Hastings regards as his three most enduringly important books: Nature, Man and God (1934), Readings in St John's Gospel (1939 and 1940), and Christianity and Social Order (1942). The first of these was compiled from his Gifford lectures given in Glasgow between November 1932 and March 1934; The Manchester Guardian called it "a fine example of [Temple's] astonishing vigour and versatility" and quoted Dean Inge's comment, "It would be a great achievement for a university professor; for a ruler of the Church it is astonishing". Christianity and Social Order sought to marry faith and socialism and rapidly sold around 140,000 copies.

Temple's contributions in the social field during his time as Archbishop of York included working with a specialist committee and the Pilgrim Trust to produce a report on unemployment, Men without Work (1938), and convening and chairing the Malvern conference (1941) on church and society. The latter proposed six requisites for a society based on Christianity: every child should find itself a member of a family housed with decency and dignity; every child should have an opportunity for education up to maturity; every citizen should have sufficient income to make a home and bring up his children properly; every worker should have a voice in the conduct of the business or industry in which he works; every citizen should have sufficient leisure – two days' rest in seven and annual holiday with pay; every citizen should be guaranteed freedom of worship, speech, assembly, and association.

== Archbishop of Canterbury: 1942–1944 ==
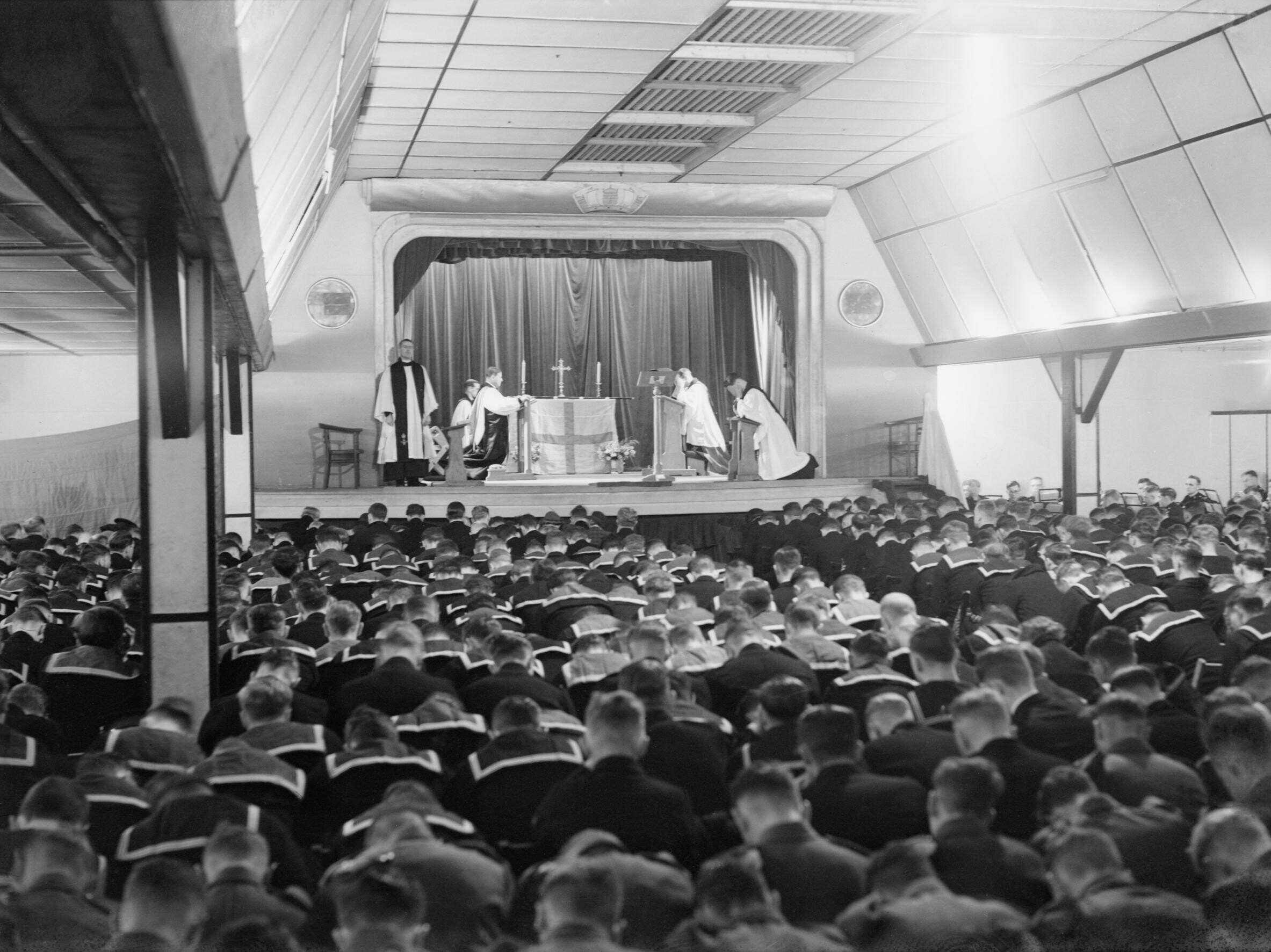
Temple conducts a service at Scapa Flow, September 1942

Lang retired as archbishop in March 1942. There had been right-wing political attempts to block Temple's succession; he was well aware of this: "some of my recent utterances have not been liked in political circles". (Note: The Prime Minister, Winston Churchill, allayed his misgivings about Temple by nominating Cyril Garbett for York, as, he hoped, a restraining influence. In fact Garbett was at least as left-wing as Temple, though less outspoken.) But the overwhelming expectation and desire that Temple should succeed Lang prevailed. His biographer Frederic Iremonger cites Lang's strong recommendation together with Temple's "reputation at home, in the Anglican communion overseas, and in the continental Churches; his prophetic leadership; his wide and massive knowledge … his immense powers of concentration; the personal devotion of his life". The Prime Minister, Winston Churchill, who was responsible for nominating the new archbishop, was well aware of Temple's political views, but accepted that he was the outstanding candidate: "the only half a crown article in the sixpenny bazaar". (Note: Iremonger quotes Bernard Shaw: "To a man of my generation an archbishop of Temple's enlightenment was a realized impossibility".) Temple was enthroned in Canterbury Cathedral on 23 April 1942.

In March 1943, Temple addressed the House of Lords, urging action to be taken on the atrocities being carried out by Nazi Germany. He drew criticism in 1944 from his numerous Quaker connections for writing an introduction to Stephen Hobhouse's book Christ and our Enemies that did not condemn the Allied carpet bombing of Germany; he said that he was "not only non-pacifist but anti-pacifist". He did not deny pacifists' right to refuse to fight, but maintained that they must take responsibility for their renunciation of the use of force. He said that people are responsible not only for what they intend, but for the foreseen results of their activity: if Adolf Hitler remained unopposed and conquered Europe, pacifists had to be willing to accept responsibility for this, in that they had not opposed him.

Temple was able to complete the work of Davidson, who had striven unsuccessfully for reform of Britain's fragmented and inadequate primary education systems (known as "elementary schools" until 1944). The Education Act 1902 had been impeded by nonconformist objections to spending taxpayers' money on Anglican schools, but by the 1940s the sectarian divide was less rigid, and the Church of England was more ready to accept nationalisation of Anglican schools as their financial position had become dire. Nonconformist leaders trusted Temple's sense of justice and honesty so that he was able to help negotiate the place of most church schools within the system agreed in the Education Act 1944, with some retaining a degree of autonomy over teacher appointments and religious teaching. (Note: see also Political career of Rab Butler (1941-1951) for more detailed discussion.)

In the war years Temple travelled continually around England, often speaking several times in a single day. He suffered all his life from gout, which under the burdens of his workload grew steadily worse and early in October 1944 he was taken by ambulance from Canterbury to rest at a hotel in Westgate-on-Sea, where he died of a heart attack on 26 October. His funeral service was held in Canterbury Cathedral on 31 October and was led by Lang, together with Cyril Garbett, Archbishop of York, and Hewlett Johnson, Dean of Canterbury. Temple was the first Archbishop of Canterbury to be cremated. His ashes were buried in the cloister at Canterbury Cathedral, next to the grave of his father.

== Reputation and legacy ==
Temple's death was followed by tributes not only from within the Church of England but also from the Roman Catholic Archbishop of Westminster, Bernard Griffin, from nonconformist leaders, and from the Chief Rabbi, Joseph Hertz, who said, "Dr Temple was a great power for good far beyond the borders of the national church. Israel has lost a true friend and humanity a valiant champion. We shall all bitterly miss him." President Roosevelt wrote to George VI on Temple's death expressing the sympathy of the American people, saying, "As an ardent advocate of international co-operation based on Christian principles he exerted a profound influence throughout the world". Lang was greatly distressed by his successor's death. He wrote, "I don't like to think of the loss to the Church and Nation... But 'God knows and God reigns'".

In a biographical essay, Bishop George Bell wrote:

William Temple was not only one of the greatest men of his day, but also one of the greatest teachers who have ever filled the Archbishopric of Canterbury. His tenure of the see was for no more than two and a half years, yet his influence on the British people, in the field of social justice, on the Christian Church as a whole, and in international relations, was of a kind to which it would be very difficult to find a parallel in the history of England.

Among several enduring memorials to Temple is the William Temple Foundation (formerly the William Temple College) in Manchester, a research and resource centre for those developing discipleship and ministry in an urban industrial society.

William Temple is honoured in the Church of England and in the Episcopal Church on 6 November.

== Works ==
- The Faith and Modern Thought (1910)
- The Nature of Personality (1911)
- Foundations: A Statement of Christian Belief in Terms of Modern Thought: By Seven Oxford Men, contributor (1912)
- The Kingdom of God (1914)
- Studies In The Spirit And Truth Of Christianity: Being University And School Sermons (1914)
- Church and Nation (1915)
- Plato and Christianity, three lectures (1916)
- Mens Creatrix (1917)
- Fellowship with God (1920)
- Life of Bishop Percival (1921)
- Christus Veritas (1924)
- Personal Religion and the Life of Fellowship (1926)
- Christianity and the State (1928)
- Christian Faith and life (1931)
- Nature, Man and God Gifford Lectures (1934)
- Men Without Work (1938)
- Readings in St John's Gospel (1939/1940. Complete edition 1945)
- Christianity and Social Order (1942)
- The Church Looks Forward (1944)

== Arms ==
Coat of arms of William Temple, Archbishop of Canterbury
| Escutcheon Impaled - Dexter - Azure, an archiepiscopal staff in pale or, ensigned with a cross patée argent, surmounted of a pall of the last, charged with four crosses formée fitchée sable, edged and fringed or (Archbishopric of Canterbury); Sinister - Quarterly 1st & 4th, Or, an eagle displayed sable (for Leofric, Earl of Mercia); 2nd & 3rd Argent, two bars sable, each charged with three martlets or (Temple). Other versions The archespicopal staff in the arms of the see of Canterbury is sometimes blazoned all or, or with the staff argent and cross or. |

== Notes ==
Church of England titles
| Preceded by Edmund Knox | Bishop of Manchester; 1921–1929 | Succeeded by Guy Warman |
| Preceded by Cosmo Gordon Lang | Archbishop of York; 1929–1942 | Succeeded by Cyril Garbett |
| Preceded by Cosmo Gordon Lang | Archbishop of Canterbury; 1942–1944 | Succeeded by Geoffrey Fisher |
Academic offices
| New office | President of the Workers' Educational Association; 1908–1924 | Succeeded by Fred Bramley |
| Preceded by Lionel Ford | Headmaster of Repton School; 1910–1914 | Succeeded by Geoffrey Fisher |
