= Industrial Charter =

Political pamphlet from the U.K. Conservative Party on the post-war consensus

The Industrial Charter: A Statement of Conservative Industrial Policy was a 1947 pamphlet and policy statement by the United Kingdom Conservative Party. The Charter is widely regarded as representing a seminal moment in the history of post war Conservatism as the party reconciled itself with many of the economic and social policies introduced by Clement Attlee's Labour government following the 1945 United Kingdom general election.

== History ==
The Charter was first published in May 1947. It was the outcome of a process of rethinking brought about by the Conservative's landslide defeat in the 1945 United Kingdom general election. This process had begun a year earlier when the party's newly extended Research Department began work on defining a policy that was both Conservative and progressive. The policy statement was accepted on 2 October 1947 at the Conservative's Annual Conference being held in Brighton.

== Content ==
The Industrial Charter was a collection of distinct economic policies and included a separate "Pledge to the Consumer", a "Woman's Charter" and a "Workers' Charter". It accepted the idea of a mixed economy, gave a commitment that the party would protect labour rights, stressed the need for fairness and opposed protectionism.

Its emphasis was, though, placed squarely upon the individual and the document was highly-critical of its opponents. The Labour Party's attempts at economic planning were criticised for having created an incompetent and swollen civil service focused on administering a multitude of overlapping and unnecessary restrictions. It argued that the party had removed economic incentives and enforced a 'rigid straight jacket (sic) of doctrinaire political theory…[and] unnecessary controls'. Instead it called for a rolling back of the state and urged that a 'sense of realism, free opportunity, incentives and justice' should 'inspire all industrial policy'.

== Reception ==
The Charter and a shortened 'popular' version were generally well received, sold an estimated 2.5 million copies and have often been thought to have helped "rehabilitate" the Conservative Party after 1945.

Churchill, Leader of the Opposition, held a dinner at the Savoy and complimented the Charter to Rab Butler, who was in charge of the party's policy-making apparatus, but never formally adopted it as party policy. It was published on 12 May 1947. It was praised loudly by every paper apart from the Labour Herald. Churchill, who is said to have commented “but I do not agree with a word of this” to Reginald Maudling’s five-line summary, did not endorse the Charter until after publication. It was said by the Tory Right that the Industrial Charter would “amalgamate the Tory party with the YMCA”. The document caused a notable degree of debate at the October 1947 Conservative Party Conference.

Harold Macmillan managed to persuade the press that the Charter was derived from his 1930s book “The Middle Way”, a claim echoed by Quintin Hogg. This was largely untrue, although Macmillan had sometimes bored drafting meetings by reading extracts from his book. In the view of historian Stuart Ball, the Charter probably owed more to Harry Crookshank’s tenure as Secretary for Mines in the late 1930s, when he followed a policy of cartelisation and market-sharing.

Despite its favourable press, the historian Andrew Taylor also contends that the Charter should be seen as a propaganda failure as it failed to reach its intended audience. This is backed up by a report conducted by Mass Observation which found that eighty per cent of a sample had no knowledge at all of the Charter in the month after its publication.

== Historical significance ==
Although perhaps not as pivotal a moment of the Conservative Party's history as often claimed, the Charter remains historically symbolic as marking the acceptance of the post-war consensus that would later be satirised as Butskellism. This owes much to the significance later imbued into the document by those responsible for its publication.

== Additional Bibliography ==
- Ball, Simon (2004). The Guardsmen. London: HarperCollins. ISBN 978-0-00-257110-4. (a joint biography of Harold Macmillan, Lord Salisbury, Oliver Lyttelton and Harry Crookshank)
- Butler, Rab (1971). The Art of the Possible. London: Hamish Hamilton. ISBN 978-0241020074., his autobiography
- Dorey, P. (1995). British Politics Since 1945. London: Blackwells. p. 25. ISBN 0631190759. (Google Books)
- Howard, Anthony RAB: The Life of R. A. Butler, Jonathan Cape 1987 ISBN 978-0-224-01862-3 excerpt
- Jago, Michael Rab Butler: The Best Prime Minister We Never Had?, Biteback Publishing 2015 ISBN 978-1849549202
- Kynaston, David (2007). Austerity Britain: 1945–1951. London: Bloomsbury. pp. 238–241. ISBN 978-0-7475-7985-4.
- Wrigley, C. (1997). British Trade Unions, 1945-1995. Manchester: Manchester University Press. p. 5. ISBN 0719041473. (Google Books)
