= R. H. Tawney =

English philosopher (1880–1962)

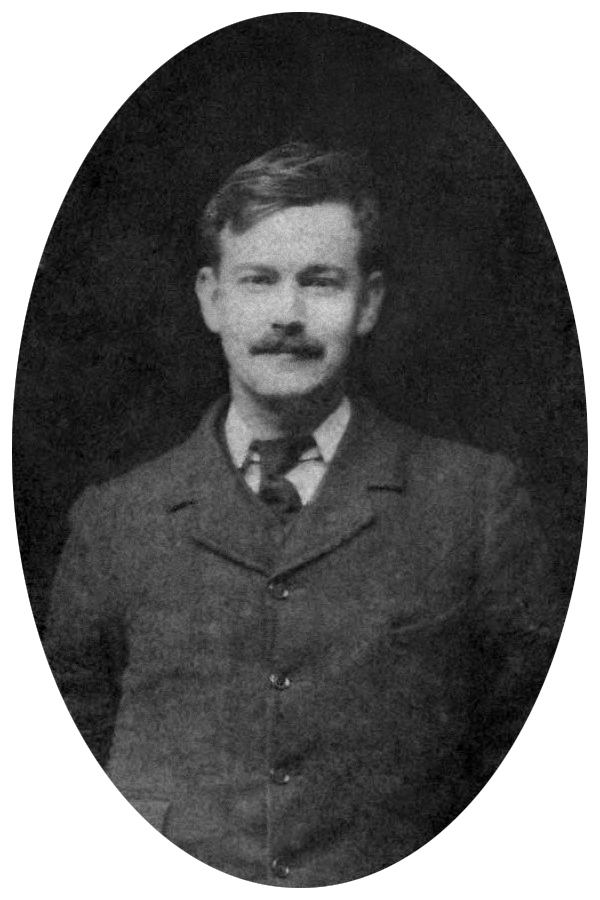
- Born: Richard Henry Tawney; 30 November 1880; Calcutta, British India
- Died: 16 January 1962 (aged 81); London, England
- Other name: Harry Tawney
- Political party: Labour
- Movement: Christian socialism; Ethical socialism
- Spouse: Jeannette Tawney (m. 1909)

Academic background
- Education: Rugby School; Balliol College, Oxford
- Academic advisor: Arthur Lionel Smith

Academic work
- Discipline: Economics; history
- Sub-discipline: Economic history
- Institutions: London School of Economics
- Notable works: The Acquisitive Society (1920); Religion and the Rise of Capitalism (1926); Equality (1931)

Richard Henry Tawney (Note: Pronounced /ˈtɔːni/.) (30 November 1880 – 16 January 1962) was an English economic historian, social critic, ethical socialist, Christian socialist, and important proponent of adult education.

The Oxford Companion to British History (1997) explained that Tawney made a "significant impact" in these "interrelated roles". A. L. Rowse goes further by insisting that "Tawney exercised the widest influence of any historian of his time, politically, socially and, above all, educationally."

== Early life and education ==
Born on 30 November 1880 in Calcutta, British India (present-day Kolkata, India), Tawney was the son of the Sanskrit scholar Charles Henry Tawney. He was educated at Rugby School, arriving on the same day as William Temple, a future Archbishop of Canterbury; they remained friends for life. He read Greats at Balliol College, Oxford. The college's "strong ethic of social service" combined with Tawney's own "deep and enduring Anglicanism" helped shape his sense of social responsibility.

After graduating from Oxford in 1903, he and his friend William Beveridge lived at Toynbee Hall, then the home of the recently formed Workers' Educational Association (WEA). The experience was to have a profound effect upon him. He realised that charity was insufficient and major structural change was required to bring about social justice for the poor.

== Christian socialism ==
Whilst Tawney remained a regular churchgoer, his Christian faith remained a personal affair, and he rarely spoke publicly about the basis of his beliefs. In keeping with his social radicalism, Tawney came to regard the Church of England as a "class institution, making respectful salaams to property and gentility, and with too little faith in its own creed to call a spade a spade in the vulgar manner of the New Testament."

For three years from January 1908, Tawney taught the first Workers' Educational Association tutorial classes at Longton, Stoke-on-Trent, and Rochdale, Lancashire. For a time, until he moved to Manchester after marrying Jeannette (William Beveridge's sister and a Somerville graduate), Tawney was working as part-time economics lecturer at Glasgow University. To fulfil his teaching commitments to the WEA, he travelled first to Longton for the evening class every Friday, before travelling north to Rochdale for the Saturday afternoon class. Tawney clearly saw these classes as a two-way learning process. "The friendly smitings of weavers, potters, miners and engineers, have taught me much about the problem of political and economic sciences which cannot easily be learned from books".

Prior to the War, he also directed a research project on the tailoring industry in London, for which the pioneer social researcher Varvara de Vesselitsky was one of the research workers and writers of the report published in 1915.

== World War I service ==
During the First World War, Tawney served as a Sergeant in the 22nd Manchester Regiment. He turned down a commission as an officer as a result of his political beliefs, preferring instead to serve in the ranks. He had initially opposed the war on political grounds. He decided, however, to enlist following reports of atrocities committed during the German Army's invasion of Belgium. He served at the Battle of the Somme (1916), where he was wounded twice on the first day and had to lie in no man's land for 30 hours until a medical officer evacuated him. He was transported to a French field hospital and later evacuated to Britain.

The war led Tawney to grapple with the nature of original sin. "The goodness we have reached is a house built on piles driven into black slime and always slipping down into it unless we are building night and day." It also heightened his sense of urgency for meaningful social, economic and political change. In 1918, he largely wrote Christianity and Industrial Problems, the fifth report (the other four were on more ecclesiastical matters) from a Church of England commission which included a number of bishops. Notable for its socialist flavour, the report "set the tone for most Anglican post-war social thinking."

== Academic historian ==
Tawney's first important work as a historian was The Agrarian Problem in the Sixteenth Century (1912). He was a Fellow of Balliol College from 1918 to 1921. From 1917 to 1931, he was a lecturer at the London School of Economics (LSE). In 1926 he helped found the Economic History Society with Sir William Ashley, amongst others, and became the joint editor of its journal, The Economic History Review. From 1931 until retirement in 1949, he was a professor of economic history at the LSE and Professor Emeritus after 1949. He was an Honorary Doctor of the universities of Oxford, Manchester, Birmingham, Sheffield, London, Chicago, Melbourne, and Paris. He was an elected International member of the American Philosophical Society.

Tawney's historical works reflected his ethical concerns and preoccupations in economic history. He was profoundly interested in the issue of the enclosure of land in the English countryside in the 16th and 17th centuries and in Max Weber's thesis on the connection between the appearance of Protestantism and the rise of capitalism. His belief in the rise of the gentry in the century before the outbreak of the Civil War in England provoked the 'Storm over the gentry' in which his methods were subjected to severe criticisms by Hugh Trevor-Roper and John Cooper.

Religion and the Rise of Capitalism (1926) was his classic work and made his reputation as an historian. It explored the relationship between Protestantism and economic development in the 16th and 17th centuries. Tawney "bemoaned the division between commerce and social morality brought about by the Protestant Reformation, leading as it did to the subordination of Christian teaching to the pursuit of material wealth".

The Oxford historian Valerie Pearl once described Tawney as having appeared to those in his presence as having an "aura of sanctity". He lent his name to the Tawney Society at Rugby School, the R. H. Tawney Economic History Society at the London School of Economics, the annual Tawney Memorial Lectures (Christian Socialist Movement), the R. H. Tawney Building at Keele University and the Tawney Tower Hall of Residence at Essex University.

Adrian Hastings wrote:

Behind the list of major publications was the mind of a man tirelessly guiding government, Labour movement, Church and academic community towards a new society, at once fully democratic, consciously socialistic and fully in accord with Christian belief. In effective intellectual terms it is doubtful whether anyone else had remotely comparable influence in the evolution of British society in his generation

== Activism ==
=== Social criticism ===
Two of Tawney's books stand out as his most influential social criticism: The Acquisitive Society (1920), Richard Crossman's "socialist bible", and Equality (1931), "his seminal work". The former, one of his most widely read books, criticised the selfish individualism of modern society. Capitalism, he insisted, encourages acquisitiveness and thereby corrupts everyone. In the latter book, Tawney argues for an egalitarian society.

Both works reflected Tawney's Christian moral values, "exercised a profound influence" in Britain and abroad, and "anticipated the Welfare state". As David Ormrod of the University of Kent stresses, "intermittent opposition from the Churches to the new idolatry of wealth surfaced from time to time but no individual critics have arisen with a combination of political wisdom, historical insight and moral force to match that of R.H. Tawney, the prophet who denounced acquisitiveness".

=== Christian socialist politics ===
Historian Geoffrey Foote has highlighted Tawney's "political shifts": "From an endorsement of a radical Guild socialism in 1921 through his authorship of the gradualist Labour & the Nation in 1928, his savage attacks on gradualism in the 1930s to his endorsement of revisionism in the 1950s". Nevertheless, the same author also argues that "Tawney's importance lies in his ability to propose a malleable yet coherent socialist philosophy which transcends any particular political situation. In this sense, his mature political thought never really changed".

In 1906, Tawney joined the Fabian Society and was elected to its executive from 1921 to 1933. His fellow Fabian Beatrice Webb described him as a "saint of socialism" exercising influence without rancour. He joined the Independent Labour Party in 1909 and the Labour Party in 1918. He stood three times, all unsuccessfully, for election to a seat in the House of Commons: for Rochdale in 1918, for Tottenham South in 1922, and for Swindon in 1924. In 1935, Tawney refused the offer of a "safe seat", believing that being an MP was now not the most effective contribution he could make to the Labour Party.

He participated in numerous government bodies concerned with industry and education. In 1919, he and Sidney Webb were among the trade union side representatives on the Royal Commission on the Coal Mining Industry, chaired by Sir John Sankey. Equal division of membership between union and employer representatives resulted in opposing recommendations on the future organisation of the industry. The union side recommended nationalisation largely due to Tawney and Webb.

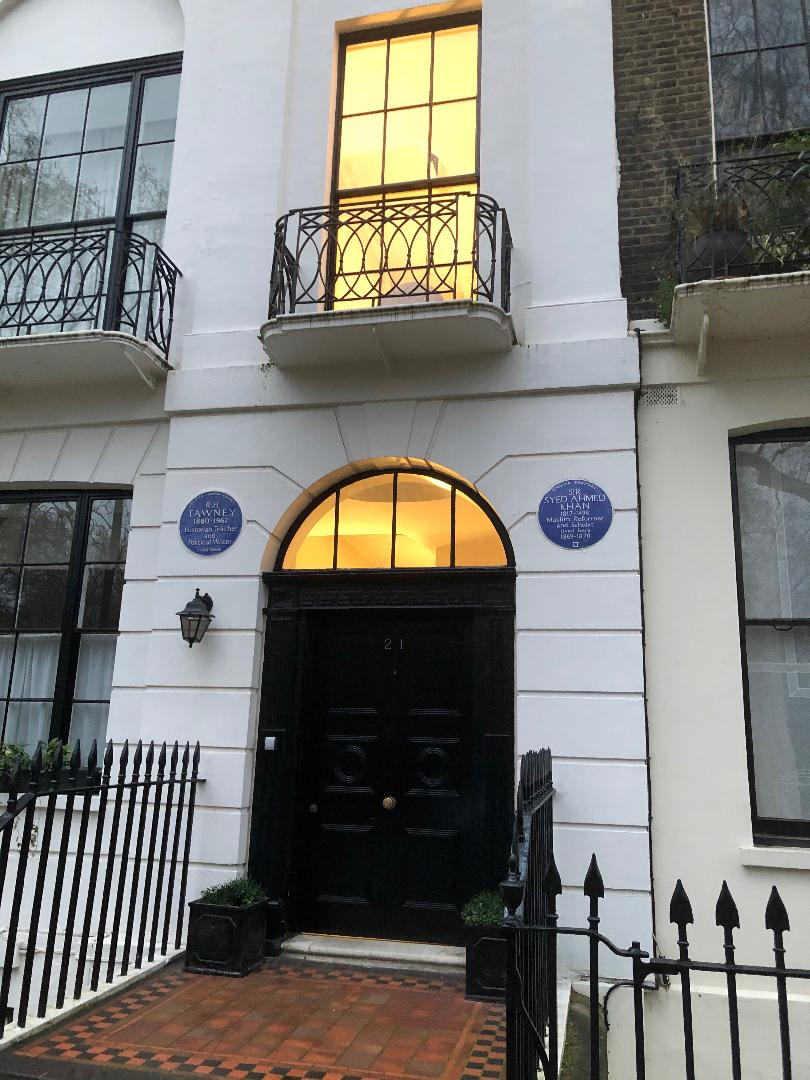
21, Mecklenburgh Square, Tawney's London home. The other Blue plaque commemorates Syed Ahmad Khan who also lived there.

His Secondary Education for All (1922) "informed Labour policy for a generation" and Tawney has been credited for the Party document, Labour & the Nation (1928), which formed the basis of the 1931 general election manifesto. Geoffrey Foote has claimed that

Tawney's importance in the realm of political thought, and his contribution to the Labour Party, cannot be overestimated. His call for specific reforms in health and education were important in laying the basis of Labour's plans for the welfare state, while his criticisms of acquisitive morality were an important intellectual and emotional basis for many future politicians who were committed to social reform. However, the reforms in the social services which were eventually to be put into effect by the 1945 Labour government took place within the confines of the acquisitive society condemned by Tawney. The social advances made by the Labour Party were not to be as permanent as many believed.

=== Adult education advocacy ===
Leveraging his base among intellectuals in the Labour Party, he spent years in making a lasting impact on democratising higher education. He promoted equality, through restructuring and curricular innovation. For more than forty years, from 1905 to 1948, Tawney served on the Workers' Educational Association executive, holding the offices of Vice-President (1920–28; 1944–48) and President (1928–44). He served on the Consultative Committee of the Board of Education (1912–31), the education Committee of the London County Council, and the University Grants Committee. He contributed to several government reports on education. His thinking was influential in the creation of the University College of North Staffordshire which opened in 1950 and received its University Charter in 1962 as the University of Keele. The new Teaching Block was renamed the Tawney Building in May 1960 in recognition of Tawney's impact on the educational ideals and principles that inspired the "Keele Experiment".

== Death and interment ==
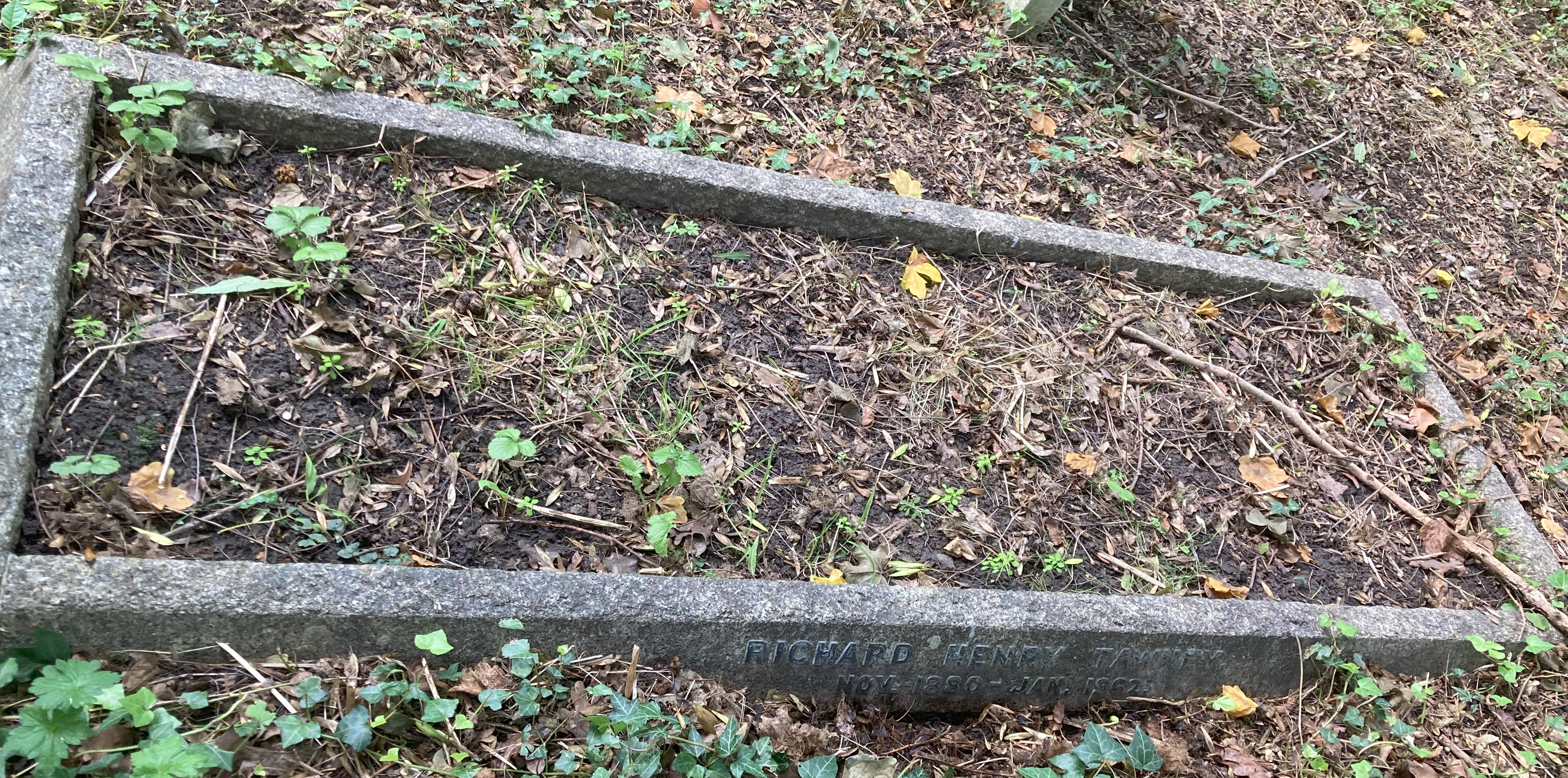
Grave of Richard Tawney in Highgate Cemetery

Tawney died in London on 16 January 1962. He is buried on the eastern side of Highgate Cemetery. Richard Rees was his literary executor.

== Works ==
- The Agrarian Problem in the Sixteenth Century (1912), London: Longman, Green and Co.
- English Economic History: Select Documents (1914, compiled and edited with Alfred Edward Bland and Philip Anthony Brown)
- The Acquisitive Society (1920); republished Harcourt Brace and Howe (Mineola, NY, Dover: 2004; ISBN 0-486-43629-2)
- Secondary Education for All (1922)
- Education: the Socialist Policy (1924)
- Historical Introduction to A Discourse Upon Usury, by Thomas Wilson (1925)
- Tudor Economic Documents: being Select Documents illustrating the Economic and Social History of Tudor England (1925, editor with Eileen Power)
- Religion and the Rise of Capitalism (London: John Murray, 1926); republished Mentor (1953) and Peter Smith (1962; ISBN 0-7658-0455-7)
- Equality (1931; ISBN 0-04-323014-8)
- Land and Labour in China (1932) (excerpt)
- Social History and Literature (1950)
- The Attack and Other Papers (1953)
- Business and Politics under James I: Lionel Cranfield as Merchant and Minister (1958), Cambridge: Cambridge University Press
- The Radical Tradition: Twelve Essays on Politics, Education and Literature (1964), Harmondsworth, Penguin; ISBN 0-14-020834-8

== Notes ==
Academic offices
Preceded by Arthur Pugh	President of the Workers' Educational Association; 1928–1944	Succeeded by Harold Clay
