= Secondary Education for All =

1922 book by R. H. Tawney

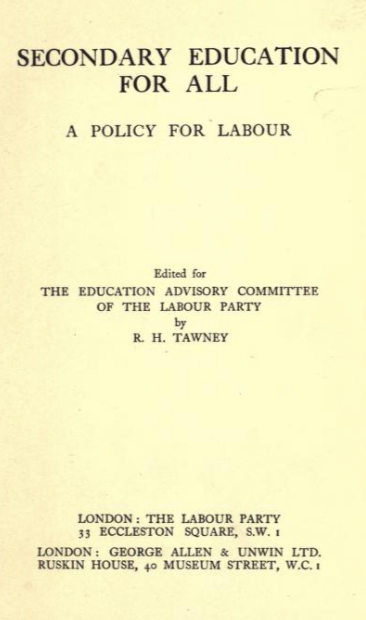
- Title page for Secondary Education for All (1922)
- Author: R. H. Tawney
- Language: English
- Genre: Non-fiction
- Publisher: Bloomsbury
- Publication date: 1922
- Publication place: United Kingdom
- ISBN: 0907628990

Secondary Education for All is a 1922 book written by the historian and education theorist R. H. Tawney. It was written as a key policy statement for the rising Labour Party.

== Content ==
The work analysed the provision of education at secondary level in the UK in the early 1920s and made recommendations for changes of governmental policy, specifically to administer the creation of a universal and free system of secondary education. One of the most pressing concerns in the work was the attempt to transform existing class relationships in an educational context; Tawney wished to see the elimination of the "vulgar irrelevancies of class inequality". It was written only a few years after the passage of the Education Act (1918) which had been engaged with by Tawney in his role as a key member of the Labour party's educational committee (alongside other figures such as Percy Nunn). Tawney's work was based on abstract and ideological considerations but also empirical case studies such as the extension of secondary education in Bradford and Birmingham.

Tawney also propounded the need for a variety of secondary schools based on local circumstances, but was adamant that variety should not involve the perpetuation of class distinctions and inequities.

== Legacy and influence ==
The document foreshadowed Tawney's later work on the Hadow Report; his work on that as well as Secondary Education for All, particularly in terms of the espousal of a universal system of secondary education, was deeply influential in the provisions of the Education Act 1944 and the extension of the compulsory school leaving age to 15 in 1947. The work was not intended to lead to instantaneous changes, since it suggested that such transformations would be undertaken over the course of 'a generation'.

The legacy of the work is remarkable given the widespread feeling that it was not practical or desirable among a wide number of groups, particularly businessmen and employers, who considered the idea of universal secondary education to be both expensive and not necessarily successful or productive. Although in retrospect such a proposal may seem obvious, at the time it was not: in 1921, for instance, merely one in eleven (just above 9%) of all those aged over 11 and under 15 went to secondary schools in some form.
