= Saffron Walden Museum =

Museum in Saffron Walden

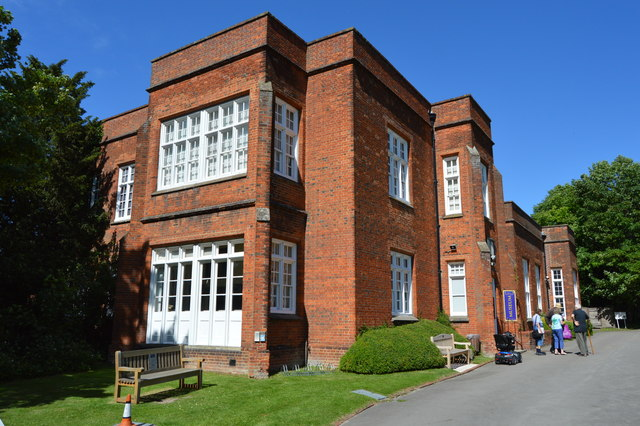
- The entrance to the Saffron Walden Museum
- Established: 1835
- Location: Museum Street, Saffron Walden, Essex CB10 1BN, England
- Coordinates: 52.02543°N 0.24079°E
- Type: Local museum
- Owner: Saffron Walden Museum Society
- Employees: 50 volunteers
- Website: saffronwaldenmuseum.org

Saffron Walden Museum is a local museum in Saffron Walden, Essex, England. Established in 1835 by the Saffron Walden Natural History Society, with collections assembled from 1832 by local benefactors including Jabez Gibson and Lord Braybrooke of Audley End, it was built as a purpose-designed museum, making it one of the oldest purpose-built museums in the United Kingdom. It was built to house collections of natural history, antiquities and other objects of local and general interest, a role the museum continues to fulfil.

The museum is located on Museum Street within the town of Saffron Walden, set in an enclosed grass meadow near the ruins of the 12-century Walden Castle. Its collections comprise around 175,000 objects and specimens spanning ancient cultures, archaeology, ceramics and glass, costumes and textiles, geology, furniture and woodwork, social and local history, natural history, and world cultures.

Highlights of the museum's collection include: Wallace the Lion; the painted coffin of the Egyptian Tayef-herut-nakht; a Roman period mummy from Egypt; a rare late Tudor "rail and rope" bed; a glove traditionally associated with Mary, Queen of Scots; and an 18th-century suit of Japanese samurai armour. The museum also holds significant natural history and ethnographic collections assembled during the nineteenth century, alongside extensive archaeological material and later objects relating to the history of north-west Essex.

The museum is operated by Uttlesford District Council in partnership with Saffron Walden Museum Society Ltd, the charitable organisation that owns the building and collections and provides talks and events for its members, and is supported by a team of over 50 volunteers.

== History ==
=== Foundation and Early Development ===
Saffron Walden Museum was founded by the Saffron Walden Natural History Society and opened in 1835, three years after the Society's establishment. The idea of creating a museum in the town emerged in 1832, following discussions between local figures including Jabez Gibson, Richard Griffin, 3rd Lord Braybrooke of Audley End, and John Player. The earliest recorded meeting of the Society took place on 22 November 1832 at Gibson's home, adjoining the cattle market in Hill Street. At this meeting the Society's Rules and Regulations were agreed and a committee appointed: Jabez Gibson (chairman), John Player, Thomas Spurgin, Joshua Clarke and William Ward. The Society resolved to establish a museum containing "specimens in the several departments of Natural History, with Antiquarian remains, and other such Articles as may be of local or general interests."

For nearly three years before the museum opened, collections were assembled in Jabez Gibson's house, which served as a temporary store for specimens, cases and display equipment. During this period the committee actively sought donations from botanists, professors and private collectors. The earliest recorded accession was from a zoological society, consisting of 30 birds and a deer.

Although the ruins of Walden Castle were initially considered as a site, it was decided to erect a purpose-built building on Bury Hill, between St Mary's Church and the Castle. The land was leased from Lord Braybrooke, and the purpose-built museum was erected in 1833–34. An eastward extension, known as the Agricultural Hall (now the Great Hall) was included to accommodate meetings of the Saffron Walden Agricultural Society, which Lord Braybrooke had founded. The museum itself initially occupied the first floor of the western portion of the building, with rooms for lectures and other societies below.

The museum opened in May 1835. In its early years it was accessible primarily to subscribers and was open one afternoon per week during the summer months. Contemporary accounts describe displays dominated by large skeletons and taxidermy, alongside geological specimens, ethnographic objects and antiquities. One early visitor recorded "stuffed birds and animals... shells, birds' eggs, nests, skeletons... a beautiful rhinoceros... Indian curiosities... minerals... [and] the head of an elephant."

=== Significant Expansion (1837-1850s) ===
In 1837 a large African elephant obtained through contacts with the Dunn family in South Africa was purchased by Jabez Gibson and mounted for display, becoming one of the museum's most celebrated early exhibits. The same consignment included a hippopotamus, rhinoceros, gnu and ant-eater. In response to the rapid growth of the collections, Lord Braybrooke agreed in 1837 to fund the addition of two large rooms at the rear of the building, one on the ground floor and one above (now the 'Worlds of Man' gallery), together with two smaller rooms, described as a "cottage", for the caretaker.

In 1838 the museum acquired one of its most notable specimens, the lion Wallace, from Wombwell's travelling menagerie. Wallace, reputedly the first African lion successfully bred in captivity in Britain, had been born in Edinburgh in 1812. He became widely known for participating in a controversial lion-baiting event at Warwick in 1825 and died in 1838 at the age of 25, an unusually long lifespan for a menagerie animal of the period. His mounted remains became a prominent feature of the museum's displays.

A significant setback occurred in 1842 when a quantity of gold and silver coins was stolen from the collections. Suspicion fell on John Wright, the son of the building's caretaker, after a witness claimed to have seen him selling old coins in London. Wright was arrested and brought before the Saffron Walden magistrates, but the evidence proved insufficient and he was acquitted.

In 1844 John Player compiled a comprehensive catalogue of the museum's holdings, published the following year. It is regarded as one of the earliest illustrated museum catalogues in Britain and included an engraving of the museum interior showing the elephant, rhinoceros, giraffe, panels painted by Cipriani, Australian Aboriginal weapons, stuffed birds and Roman pottery. The catalogue contained sections on birds, reptiles, fishes and geology, as well as phrenology and ethnographic material described as illustrating the "habits of various nations".

During the same period the museum developed significant ethnographic collections. Material from south-eastern Australia was donated by John Helder Wedge, a surveyor in Tasmania and early settler near Melbourne, who collected Aboriginal artefacts in the 1830s. Objects from the Pacific Islands were contributed by George Bennet, who travelled extensively between 1821 and 1829 while inspecting missionary stations for the London Missionary Society. In 1838 the museum also acquired a Hawaiian feather cloak from the Rector of Widdington, who had received it from his brother-in-law, an attendant to the King and Queen of the Hawaiian Islands during their visit to Britain in 1824.

=== Financial Pressures and Reorganisation (1850s-1880s) ===
The fame of the museum continued to spread during the 19th century, in part through the inclusion of its African elephant in the Great Exhibition of 1851. The Trustees agreed to lend the specimen at the request of the Exhibition's organisers, who wished to display an Indian howdah upon it, despite the elephant's African origin. The removal of the mounted animal from the first-floor gallery and its transport to London, was a notable undertaking and attracted local attention.

Despite its public profile, the museum experienced increasing financial difficulties in the second half of the century. Treasurer's accounts show that trustees were frequently required to supplement funds and archival records suggest a gradual decline in resources between the 1850s and 1870s. Nonetheless, important additions to the collections continued, including architectural fragments and further ethnographic and decorative arts material. In 1872, William Murray Tuke acquired items from the dispersal of the Sudbury Museum collections and later deposited many of them at Saffron Walden.

A similar fate to that suffered by Sudbury Museum might have befallen this Museum had it not been for beneficence of George Stacey Gibson who in the 1880s endowed the Museum in such a way as to give it a new lease of life. in addition to financial assistance, Gibson also played a key role in the extension of the Town Hall in 1879, which included an Assembly Hall and rendered the Agricultural Hall redundant as a civic meeting space. This enabled the Natural History Society to assume full occupation of the museum building. Gibson also contributed to the funding of a paid curator and supported the reorganisation of the museum's administration and displays.

=== Professional Curatorship and Educational Development (1880-1918) ===
The first paid Curator of the Museum was George Nathan Maynard, appointed in 1880. His initial responsibilities included reorganising the collections and transferring material from the first-floor galleries to newly available space in the Agricultural Hall and other areas on the ground floor. He introduced systematic accession registers in bound volumes, establishing a collection recording system. Among the objects relocated in 1880-81 was the African elephant, which became the central feature of the reorganised displays. The first-floor galleries were subsequently refurbished to accommodate expanding collections of ceramics and glass, much of which had been donated by William Murray Tuke and Henry Stear, a local Medical Officer of Health. By 1887 the museum's improvements were recognised in a report in a report by the British Association for the Advancement of Science, which classified it as a first-class provincial museum.

In 1904 Guy Maynard succeeded his father as curator. Having grown up in the building, he placed particular emphasis on the museum's educational role, placing an unusually strong focus on teaching within a provisional museum of the period. In 1916 he reorganised one of the ground-floor rooms so that children could sit and be shown objects from collections. He also produced interpretative drawings illustrating the historical development of the town and introduced other measures to improve public understanding of the displays. In addition, he designated space for the preparation of new displays, reflecting an increasing systematic and professional approach to museum practice.

The museum remained open during the First World War, though it experienced heavy use from soldiers stationed locally or on leave. Following an incident involving attempted theft from the donations box, access for soldiers was restricted to weekends under supervision.

Concerns about lack of space persisted. In 1913 the trustees purchased cottages at 36-40 Castle Street with the intention of demolishing them to extend the museum northwards; these plans were suspended following the outbreak of war. In 1914 the curator moved into one of the cottages, freeing former residential rooms within the museum for display purposes. The curator's former living room now forms part of the museum's exhibition area, while the remaining cottages were subsequently let or sold.

=== Inter-war and post-war changes (1918-1974) ===
In 1918 Guy Maynard left to take up a post at Ipswich Museum and was succeeded by Hubert Collar, who worked in collaboration with George Morris. During the 1920s and 1930s the Natural History Society experienced significant financial difficulties, reflecting wider challenges faced by many provincial museums. Persistent problems of limited space and an ageing building continued to affect the institution. By 1923, overcrowding had become apparent; the so-called "bird room" also contained tapestries, war relics and oak carvings.

As the condition of the building deteriorated and the collections continued to expand, some rationalisation of the holdings took place. In the 1920s several large mammal specimens like a giraffe, were disposed of. During and after the Second World War further attention was given to the ethnographic collections. The Hawaiian feather cloak, acquired in 1838, was sold to the Royal Scottish Museum (now National Museum of Scotland), together with a small number of other Hawaiian objects and is now displayed in Edinburgh.

In 1945 the Saffron Walden Natural History Society acquired the freehold of the building, an event commemorated by a plaque above the museum entrance.

Hubert Collar retired in 1948 after 27 years of service. He was succeeded in 1952 by Mr Andrews, who established a school loans service providing specimens such as insects, birds, coins, tokens and Stone Age artefacts to local schools. Growing educational use of the collections coincided with increasing involvement from local authorities. During the 1950s financial support from Essex County Council and the Borough Council became more regular and by 1957 it was agreed that local authority representation should be included in the museum's management. As a result, the Saffron Walden Museum Society was formed in 1958 with a new Management Committee.

New staff were appointed during this period, including Dorothy Monteith and later Gillian Spencer. Mrs Spencer introduced substantial changes to the organisation and display of the museum, representing the most extensive reconfiguration since the 1880s. Display areas were rationalised, with some former exhibition spaces converted to storage. The revised approach presented selected objects rather than displaying entire holdings. This reorganisation involved the disposal of a number of natural history specimens, a decision that generated local controversy, particularly over the proposed removal of the elephant and other tropical mammals. Despite opposition, the elephant was sold to a private owner in Bath and was reportedly displayed outdoors for some years thereafter.

The reorganisation was supported financially by the Carnegie UK Trust and included the installation of new cases in the Great Hall and changes to the first-floor galleries. Subsequent curators, including Suzanna Davis and later Graham Hunter, continued the work. Despite grants from local authorities, financial pressures remained. In 1966 the Management Committee agreed to purchase the freehold of the former school building in Museum Street, funded in part through the sale of gold coins from the collection. Continuing maintenance costs prompted further consideration of disposals, leading to growing recognition that a more sustainable long-term solution was required.Continuing maintenance costs prompted further consideration of disposals, leading to growing recognition that a more sustainable long-term solution was required.

=== Transfer to local authority and modern era (1974-present) ===
In 1974, following local government reorganisation, responsibility for the museum transferred from the Saffron Walden Natural History Society to the newly formed Uttlesford District Council. After discussions between the District Council, Essex County Council and the Museum Society, and consultations with the Charities Commission, amendments were made to the Society's constitution. The museum buildings and collections were placed on licence to the District Council, which assumed responsibility for their maintenance and for the employment of staff. This arrangement provided a more stable financial framework and enabled longer-term planning for the museum's development.

The museum is now operated by Uttlesford District Council in partnership with Saffron Walden Museum Society Ltd (charity), the successor body to the Saffron Walden Natural History Society.

The collections comprise approximately 175,000 objects and specimens spanning natural sciences, archaeology, social and local history, costume and textiles, world cultures, and fine and decorative arts. The museum maintains a programme of exhibitions and events and works with a range of community and educational organisations across the district.

== Collections ==
The museum comprises ten galleries covering local history, early history, world cultures, ceramics and glass, furniture and woodwork, costume and textiles, toys and games, Egyptology, natural history and geology, as well as a temporary exhibition gallery. The collections span a broad chronological range, from prehistoric material and classical antiquities to objects illustrating the social and cultural history of Saffron Walden and the surrounding region. Collections include archaeological artefacts, Egyptian and Greek objects, natural history specimens, decorative arts, textiles, furniture, and material relating to everyday life.

Outside the museum building is a small display of geological material, including glacial boulders and stone coffins. Of particular interest is a large oval glacial boulder weighing approximately two tonnes. The boulder was transported to the area from Peterborough by the Anglian ice sheet around 500,000 years ago and was discovered during the construction of the former Acrow (Engineers) Ltd factory on Ashdon Road, Saffron Walden.

The stone is a glacial erratic, meaning it differs from the local bedrock because it was moved by glacial action. It is also a septarian nodule, formed from cemented mudstone with calcite filling cracks that create distinctive internal patterns. Septarian nodules developed in marine clay sediments during the Jurassic period, approximately 201 to 145 million years ago.

=== Entrance Hall and Local History Gallery ===
Visitors enter the museum through the Entrance Hall, which houses the Welcome Desk and museum shop. Two significant collection items are displayed there. One is a large-scale wall map of Essex by John Chapman and Peter André, surveyed between 1772 and 1774. Produced at the scale of two inches to the mile, it was the first detailed and accurate survey of the entire county, predating the Board of Ordnance (later the Ordnance Survey) by several decades. The map enabled contemporary viewers to identify villages, market towns and individual properties within the wider landscape.

The Entrance Hall also contains a replica of the Spinario (Boy with a Thorn), the classical sculpture depicting a youth removing a thorn from his foot.

The museum shop, situated beside the Welcome Desk, offers a range of items connected to the museum's collections and subject areas, including books on local history and archaeology, educational materials, toys and games, and specimens such as rocks, minerals and fossils reflecting the museum's natural history focus. The shop forms part of the museum's visitor services and contributes to its operational income.

The adjoining Local History Gallery explores the development of Saffron Walden and the surrounding district through artefacts, documents and photographs relating to domestic life, trade, industry and civic history. The displays combine civic, social and economic themes, illustrating both the lives of prominent local figures and the experiences of ordinary residents.

Among the individuals represented in the gallery are the Tudor scholar Gabriel Harvey; Henry Winstanley, designer of the first Eddystone Lighthouse; and R. A. Butler, long-serving Member of Parliament for Saffron Walden. The gallery includes a self-portrait of Winstanley and engravings of the Eddystone Lighthouse, together with works by Edward Bawden depicting local buildings such as the almshouses. The everyday lives of townspeople are explored in the gallery through material relating to trades including clockmaking, saddlery and building, as well as local government, societies, clubs and schools.

The development of civic authority in the town is illustrated by objects in the gallery such as the illuminated charter of Henry VIII granting powers to the Guild of the Holy Trinity; two silver maces issued in 1549; a gilded mace commemorating the charter of James II; and a 17th-century civic mace. A carved wooden lamb and cross, formerly placed on the council chamber table of the Saffron Walden Corporation during the election of the Mayor, also survives. The gallery also displays the 1669 bill of sale for Audley End House to Charles II. A copy of a mazer bowl from the King Edward VI almshouses is also exhibited; the original bowl was noted by Samuel Pepys during his visit to Saffron Walden in 1660.

Economic and architectural history are represented through displays illustrating the diverse industries that have shaped Saffron Walden and the surrounding rural district. While saffron cultivation, from which the town derives its name, was a particularly important and lucrative trade in the later Middle Ages and Tudor period, reflected in local heraldry and decorative plasterwork, the gallery also examines agriculture more broadly, including arable farming, livestock management and related crafts. Exhibits include agricultural tools, equipment associated with malting and brewing, and material connected with local trades such as rope-making, brickmaking and timber construction.

Architectural displays feature pargetting tools and stamps, including one bearing a saffron crocus design, alongside examples of roof tiles, thatch, oak window frames, iron casements, wattle and daub, and brickwork, demonstrating the development of local building techniques. A carved clunch fireplace from the Harvey family house depicts a rope-making scene, highlighting the importance of craft production within the town's economy.

Everyday life in the district is further represented in the gallery through agricultural implements, domestic utensils, toys and games, military artefacts, and objects relating to public service. Items on display include a constable's staff of office from Hadstock; a pillory formerly used at Newport gaol until the mid-19th century; a pewter feeding cup from Saffron Walden General Hospital; a toll sign for the bridge carrying the Cambridge road over Wicken Water; and the uniform of W. Wybre, station master at Audley End railway station in the 1930s. An iron cello made in the early 1830s by Thomas Barker, a blacksmith of Wimbish is also exhibited.

A significant modern addition to the gallery is the so-called "piano hoard". In 2017, 913 gold sovereign and half-sovereign coins dating from 1847 to 1915 were discovered concealed within a piano that had originated in Saffron Walden. The coins had been carefully wrapped in fabric-covered cardboard packages and hidden inside the instrument in the early 20th century. The piano bore a plaque for Beavan and Mothersole, a Saffron Walden firm of piano suppliers and music teachers. The hoard remained undiscovered until the instrument was moved to Shropshire and donated to a college, where a piano tuner found the coins and reported the discovery under the Treasure Act.

=== Special Exhibition Gallery ===
The Special Exhibition Gallery, located opposite the Local History Gallery behind the Welcome Desk, is dedicated to temporary displays that change regularly throughout the year. This flexible space allows the museum to present a range of themed exhibitions that complement and extend its permanent collections. Past and forthcoming exhibitions have explored subjects including local history, cultural relationships, science, archaeology and natural history, often drawing on objects from the museum's own holdings, loans from external institutions and contributions from members of the public.

For example, one recent exhibition titled "Pooch" has examined the history, science and cultural significance of dogs, while other shows have highlighted topics from firefighting history to space exploration and community heritage. These exhibitions are supported by associated events, learning activities and talks designed to engage visitors of all ages.

=== Early History ===
The Early History Gallery, located behind the Special Exhibition Gallery, presents the archaeology and early history of north-west Essex from the Ice Age to the Middle Ages. Exhibits are arranged beneath a roofscape display demonstrating the changes of style and structure in domestic buildings.

The archaeological collections include material from a number of important sites in north-west Essex, including the Roman town at Great Chesterford, Iron Age and Roman settlements at Wendens Ambo and Great Dunmow, an Anglo-Saxon manor site at Wicken Bonhunt, and a medieval farm at Stebbingford. Many discoveries have also emerged from archaeological excavations connected with development projects such as airport, road and housing construction, as well as finds reported by members of the public and metal detectorists.

The chronological displays begin with items from the Iron Age, including a mammoth tusk discovered in a gravel pit near Walden Road. The prehistoric collections illustrate early human activity in the region through a range of stone and metal artefacts. These include Neolithic flint tools such as a polished axe from Henham, together with an antler pick from the prehistoric flint mines at Grimes Graves in Norfolk. Later prehistoric material includes Bronze Age tools and weapons from the Arkesden Hoard, and examples of gold jewellery from local Bronze Age finds in north-west Essex. The display then moves into the Iron Age, with artefacts from a settlement at Wendens Ambo illustrating aspects of farming and everyday life during the period.

The displays then move into the Roman period, represented by finds from settlements and burial sites across the region. Pottery, glassware and metal objects illustrate aspects of domestic life and trade in Roman Essex. Highlights include a Roman pillar-moulded glass bowl discovered during excavations at Stansted Airport and an enamelled copper-alloy brooch in the form of a horse from Great Dunmow. Other notable objects include artefacts from the Bartlow Hills burial mounds, a Roman fish mosaic from Gloucestershire, and a bas-relief sculpture of a gladiator holding a trident from Chester.

Also displayed from the Roman period is material from a hoard near Ashdon, a group of coins and jewellery buried sometime after 406 AD. The hoard contained seven gold coins, thirty-one silver coins and a single bronze coin, including issues of the Roman emperor Honorius, together with a gold ring set with a green glass gem.

Displays in the gallery also explore the transition from Roman Britain to Anglo-Saxon England through burial goods and personal ornaments from sites across north-west Essex. Among the most notable objects is an Anglo-Saxon gold ring found in the region, dating from around 580-650 AD, combining symbols from pagan Germanic traditions with elements associated with late Roman Christianity. Other Anglo-Saxon artefacts include brooches, combs and weaving equipment from a mid-Saxon manor site at Wicken Bonhunt. Near the end of the gallery are two skeletons excavated from a late Saxon cemetery in Walden, displayed beneath a glass floor, together with a sword from the burial of a sixth-century warrior from Coombe in Kent.

Evidence of Viking and Anglo-Scandinavian influence in the region is represented by artefacts displayed in the gallery, most notably a necklace discovered in a Saxon cemetery in Abbey Lane, Saffron Walden, during excavations carried out in the 19th century by George Stacey Gibson. Dating to the 10th century, the necklace consists of glass, crystal, carnelian and silver beads together with three pendants. Two of the pendants are silver-gilt and decorated with interlace designs typical of Anglo-Scandinavian craftsmanship, while a third plain silver pendant bears a lightly engraved cross. The combination of Scandinavian decorative styles with Christian symbolism reflects the cultural interaction between Anglo-Saxon and Viking communities in eastern England during the later Anglo-Saxon period.

The gallery also displays a fragment of hide traditionally described as "Viking skin" from St Botolph's Church, Hadstock. Scientific analysis carried out at the University of Oxford for the BBC programme Blood of the Vikings, however, identified the material as cowhide. Also amongst the Viking artefacts is a gold ring from Thaxted dating from 10th to 12th centuries.

The gallery also includes material relating to the Ashdon Hoard, a group of Viking Age silver pennies discovered in the parish of Ashdon and dated to around 895 AD. The hoard, which provides important evidence for the circulation of coinage in late Anglo-Saxon England, is now largely held by the Fitzwilliam Museum and the British Museum. Two coins from the hoard, including Viking imitations of pennies of Alfred the Great, are displayed in the Early History Gallery.

Medieval material in the gallery includes religious sculptures and architectural fragments, such as a 15th-century carving of the Archangel Michael in Barnack limestone from Barnwell Priory in Cambridgeshire, together with masonry fragments associated with Walden Abbey. Stone coffins are also displayed beneath a glass floor. A rare survival of medieval clothing, a 14th-century felt and silk hat from Little Sampford is also exhibited.

=== Geology/Fossil Gallery ===
Up a short flight of steps from the Early History Gallery is a mezzanine floor devoted to geology, minerals and fossils. The displays introduce visitors to the geological history of the region and the processes through which rocks and fossils are formed. Specimens can be examined under magnifying glasses, and explanatory panels describe the fossilisation process.

The gallery includes fossils of plants and animals commonly found in Essex and Cambridgeshire, particularly from the Chalk and Red Crag seas that once covered much of East Anglia. Fossils of marine organisms from these environments are displayed alongside remains from later geological periods. Among the larger specimens are bones of an ichthyosaur, an extinct marine reptile from the age of the dinosaurs, and part of the fossilised stem of a giant horsetail plant, showing the ancestry of modern horsetails. Ammonites of various sizes are displayed, including a large specimen preserved within a septarian nodule dating to around 150-200 million years ago. Other fossils include the shell of a Queen scallop from the Red Crag deposits of eastern England.

The gallery also displays a range of minerals and rock specimens from Britain and around the world. Minerals such as calcite, fluorite and pyromorphite illustrate the variety of natural crystalline forms and colours found in mineral deposits. Examples of economically important mineral ores are also included, demonstrating how metal such as copper, lead and silver are obtained from mineral veins. Chalcopyrite, the principal ore of copper, and galena, an important source of lead and silver, are among the specimens displayed.

Several specimens in the collections were assembled by early collectors and benefactors of the museum, including Sir John St Aubyn, Dr William Babington, George Stacey Gibson and J. E. Drew, whose collections of minerals and rocks from mines and geological sites were acquired during the eighteenth and nineteenth centuries.

Other notable exhibits in the gallery include a cast of the fossil skeleton of the pterosaur Scaphognathus crassirostris, an extinct flying reptile, and a cast of the meteorite that fell at Ashdon on 9 March 1923. The museum's geology collection also includes examples of sedimentary, metamorphic and igneous rocks, together with fossils from the Ice Age deposits of the Pleistocene period.

=== Natural History Gallery ===
Up a further flight of steps from the Geology and Fossil Gallery is the Natural History Gallery, located on a mezzanine level and extending onto the first floor. The displays explore the diversity of animal and plant life represented in the museum's natural history collections.

Natural history specimens have been collected by the museum since the establishment of the Saffron Walden Natural History Society in 1832. In the early years of the museum, large zoological specimens dominated the displays in the Great Hall, including an African elephant that was later exhibited at the Great Exhibition of 1851. Today the emphasis of the collection has shifted from the acquisition of large specimens to the study and conservation of wildlife and the understanding of plants and animals in their natural environments.

The collection includes preserved specimens representing a wide range of animal groups, including mammals, birds, reptiles, amphibians, fish, insects and molluscs. Among these are British mammals, historic specimens of British and European birds and birds' eggs, and insect collections from Britain, Africa, the Middle East and Asia. A number of nineteenth-century specimens from around the world are displayed, including birds such as a red-breasted toucan, a Great Indian hornbill, hummingbirds from South America mounted beneath a glass dome, and an apostlebird collected in Australia. Other preserved specimens include mammals such as an armadillo, an otter and a fox, together with reptiles, fish and other zoological material including skeletons, skulls and shells.

One of the most notable exhibits is Wallace the Lion, a taxidermied specimen believed to have been the first lion bred in captivity in Britain. Wallace was born in Edinburgh in the early nineteenth century and belonged to the travelling menagerie of the showman George Wombwell, who had been born near Saffron Walden. After the lion's death in 1838 the body was transported by stagecoach to Saffron Walden Museum, where it was mounted and placed on display. Wallace later became widely known as the inspiration for the lion in the comic poem The Lion and Albert by Stanley Holloway.

Other notable specimens include an American bittern, an extremely rare visitor to Britain; the museum specimen represents the first recorded sighting of the species in Essex in 1826 and one of the earliest records in Britain. The gallery also displays the tusk of a male narwhal whale, a spiralling tooth that can grow to several metres in length and which is thought to have inspired legends of the unicorn.

The museum also holds a significant botanical collection. Its herbarium contains more than 14,000 preserved plant specimens, including ferns, mosses, fungi, lichens, algae and flowering plants. Many of these were collected during the nineteenth century by local botanists such as George Stacey Gibson and Joshua Clarke and are of particular importance for the study of the flora of Essex.

Displays in the gallery contrast historic taxidermy specimens with more recent material. A wildlife diorama presents modern specimens arranged in a naturalistic setting, while a recreated Victorian museum study illustrates how natural history collections were originally displayed during the nineteenth century.

=== Ancient Egypt Gallery and Ancient Greek display ===
Adjacent to the Natural History Gallery on the first floor is a small gallery devoted primarily to the museum's collection of ancient Egyptian artefacts dating from the Predynastic period to the Ptolemaic and Roman eras. The room is arranged to evoke an Egyptian tomb environment and introduces visitors to Egyptian beliefs about death and the afterlife.

Among the most prominent exhibits is the painted case of Tayef-herut-nakht, a priest who lived in the 10th century BC. Nearby is the mummified body of a young child from Roman Egypt, dating to around AD 200–250. The mummy was discovered at Deir el-Bahri near Thebes and entered the museum's collection in the late nineteenth century. Early museum records described the mummy as male, but the stye of the wrappings suggested the child might have been female. A CT scan carried out at Addenbrooke's Hospital in Cambridge in 2010 confirmed that the mummy is that of a boy aged approximately four or five years. The scan also revealed fractures to the skull and right collarbone which may have contributed to the cause of death.

Displays in the gallery illustrate Egyptian funerary customs and beliefs about the afterlife. Grave goods include food offerings, model servants, and protective amulets intended to accompany the deceased. Other artefacts include a canopic jar used during the mummification process, a ring bandaged hand and a mummified cat. Egyptian hieroglyphic writing is illustrated through a fragment of funerary papyrus from the Book of Breathings, while further inscriptions appear on the funerary stela of Wernetjer, who held the title "God's Seal Bearer".

Other notable items in the collection include shabti figures of Seti I, a double block statue depicting Wenen-Nefer and his wife Taweret-Nofret (c.1290-1080 BC), and an Amratian bowl from Upper Egypt dating to the Predynastic period (c.4000-3600 BC). The collection also includes fragments of decorated coffins, pottery vessels, and textiles used as mummy wrappings.

Material from the wider classical Mediterranean world is displayed in cases immediately outside the Egyptian room within the surrounding gallery. These include Greek and Cypriot pottery and votive objects, such as a horse-and-rider figurine from Cyprus (c.1000-700 BC), a small Cypriot flask with lug handles dating from about 1900-1600 BC, and Greek drinking vessels and funerary objects. A pottery vessel from Athens dating to 500-400 BC, later reused to contain cremated human remains, illustrates burial practices in the classical Greek world.

=== Costumes and Textiles Gallery ===
The next gallery beyond the Natural History and Ancient Cultures displays is devoted to costume, textiles and toys. The gallery brings together examples of clothing, domestic textiles and sewing equipment, illustrating the materials and techniques used to produce garments and household items in earlier centuries.

Among the most elaborate garments on display are a lady's silk riding habit, an embroidered muslin dress and a spencer jacket decorated with appliquéd ribbon. Children's clothing from the nineteenth century includes lawn dresses trimmed with broderie anglaise and Ayrshire embroidery.

Displays also explore the craft of needlework and the domestic skills associated with clothing production. Sewing tools such as thread winders, tatting shuttles, netting needles and crochet hooks are shown alongside examples of the work they produced. A sampler made by Ann Crussell in 1793 illustrates the practice of learning stitches through decorative needlework. Early sewing machines which first appeared in the mid-nineteenth century are also represented.

The gallery includes a number of historic accessories and items of dress, including mid-eighteenth-century women's shoes made from blue and cream brocaded silk over linen. A sixteenth-century embroidered glove traditionally associated with Mary, Queen of Scots is notably displayed. The glove, made of kid leather and decorated with silk and metal thread embroidery and gold lace, was reportedly given to Marmaduke Dayrell, Master of the Household at Fotheringhay Castle, on the morning of Mary's execution in 1587. It was later loaned to the museum by Francis Dayrell of Shudy Camps.

Military clothing and equipment are represented by items relating to the Essex Volunteer regiments, including a corporal's greatcoat from the 17th Essex Rifle Volunteers dating from the 1860s, a lobster-tail helmet with a scarlet horsehair plume worn by the Essex Artillery, and a drum used by the Saffron Walden Cadet Corps.

The museum's textiles collection also includes domestic furnishings and decorative needlework such as bedspreads, samplers, stumpwork embroidery and tapestries. Among the most notable are a set of eight Aubusson tapestries and fragments of a Wernier tapestry dating from around 1700.

The gallery also contains displays of toys and games illustrating changing patterns of childhood and play. Early toys were often luxury items owned by children from wealthier families, while children from poorer households were more likely to have used homemade toys such as rag dolls, which rarely survive. Examples in the collection include nineteenth-century dolls, construction toys and board games. The collection includes a bisque porcelain-headed doll with a stuffed leather body dressed in Quaker clothing dates from around 1870 and a set of 1860 wooden dolls in a leather shoe representing The Old Woman Who Lived in a Shoe.

One of the most distinctive objects in the gallery is the Clare Priory dolls' house, a detailed miniature replica of Clare Priory in Suffolk made in 1804 for the children of the Barker family who lived there. The dolls' house contains both "play" furniture intended for children's use and more elaborate pieces used when the model was shown to visitors. The miniature furniture reflects the furnishings of the original house and includes chairs bearing the Barker family coat of arms.

=== Furniture and Woodwork ===
Beyond the Custom and Textiles Gallery is a smaller gallery devoted to furniture and decorative woodwork. The museum's collection, spans a wide range of domestic furnishings and carved woodwork dating from fourteenth to the eighteenth centuries.

The displays illustrate the development of joinery techniques and changing decorative styles during this period. Many of the objects are made from carved oak, demonstrating the skill of early craftsmen and the importance placed on decoration even in everyday household items. Chests and footstools display linenfold panelling, a form of relief carving designed to imitate folded fabric that was widely used in late medieval and Tudor furniture.

Among the most notable objects is a rare Tudor standing cupboard bearing relief portraits of its original owners, Sir Francis Weston and Lady Ann Weston. The cupboard was reportedly presented to Lady Ann by her father-in-law, Richard Weston, as a wedding gift. Another important piece is a Tudor four-poster tester bed dating from around 1550, distinguished by its carved bedposts. The gallery also includes an oak cradle dated to 1723, decorated with chip-carved patterns and fitted with a hinged hood.

Several architectural fragments and decorative carvings are also displayed. These include carved lion heads that once formed part of the seventeenth-century Long Gallery at Audley End House, a fragment of an oak Gothic screen dating from the fifteenth century, and carved wooden figures that originally formed part of the roof decorations of Little Wilbraham Church. A fifteenth-century oak timber frame from a local building illustrates medieval construction methods, including heavy timbers joined with wooden pegs and wattle panels designed to hold daub infill.

Other objects in the gallery demonstrate later decorative techniques, including an eighteenth-century longcase clock decorated with delicate inlay of flowers, foliage and birds, and a gilded and japanned bedhead reflecting changing fashions in interior decoration. The gallery also includes examples of historic textiles associated with domestic interiors. including a tapestry by Guillaume Werwist.

=== Ceramics and Glass ===
Behind the Furniture and Woodwork Gallery is the Ceramics and Glass Gallery. The museum holds an extensive collection of British pottery, porcelain and glassware, together with imported items from Europe and China. In total, the collection contains almost 2,500 objects from everyday domestic wares to more elaborate decorative pieces.

Among the most notable ceramic objects displayed are seventeenth-century tin-glazed chargers, eighteenth-century Staffordshire figures, and colourful Castle Hedingham pottery produced in Essex. Other highlights include a nineteenth-century Davenport supper set, Wedgwood jasperware, and examples of Chinese armorial porcelain. The glass collection includes a variety of English drinking glasses and other domestic vessels, including an elaborate late seventeenth-century posset pot.

Practical household items such as lead-glazed chamber pots and potters' moulds are shown alongside more refined tableware, including crested plates, transfer-printed teapots and porcelain tableware. Among the objects displayed are a Spanish eighteenth-century puzzle jug designed as a drinking challenge, a commemorative mug produced for the Golden Jubilee of Queen Victoria in 1887, and a jug made at Castle Hedingham by Edward William Bingham in about 1870 bearing the inscription "Around ye Mulberry Bush".

Several unusual or decorative pieces are also represented. A Prattware earthenware jug dating from around 1812 is modelled in the form of a bear holding Napoleon between its paws, reflecting British satire following Napoleon's failed Russian campaign. Other objects include a Moorcroft vase with Claremont pattern produce at Burslem in 1916, a Staffordshire figure of a seated male entitled Elijah dating from the early nineteenth century, and a sixteenth-century face jug from Raeren in present-day Belgium.

A large proportion of the ceramics and glass collection was donated to the museum during the late nineteenth century by local benefactors including William Murray Tuke and Dr Henry Stear.

=== World Cultures ===
To the right of the Ceramics and Glass and Furniture and Woodwork galleries is the World Cultures Gallery. The museum's world cultures collection is considered of international significance. Collected largely during the nineteenth century by travellers, missionaries, soldiers and colonial administrators, the objects provide insight into the material culture of societies across the Pacific Islands, the Americas, Africa, Australia and New Zealand. While the collection reflects the colonial framework in which it was assembled, it also serves as an important historical record of cultures encountered by European collectors during that period.

The collection includes a wide variety of artefacts illustrating crafts, clothing, weapons and ceremonial objects from different regions of the world. Among the highlights are a carved figure of the Tahitian goddess Til Vahine, an early collection of Australian Aboriginal weapons and a suit of Japanese samurai armour. Other objects include Zulu shields and weapons, gold weights used by the Akan people of Ghana for weighing gold dust, Amazonian necklaces made from tiny seeds, Inuit clothing made from animal skins, and moccasins decorated with porcupine quillwork from North America.

Several important early donations helped establish the museum's ethnographic collections. Objects collected by the missionary George Bennet during his travels in the Pacific between 1821 and 1829 were among the first acquisitions. These included the carved wooden figure of the goddess Til Vahine, which Bennet donated to the museum in 1835. The surveyor John Helder Wedge, whose family lived in nearby Shudy Camps, also contributed an important group of Australian Aboriginal weapons collected in Victoria before 1840. Examples of Hawaiian bark cloth gifted to Lord Charles Harvey by Queen Emma of Hawaii during her visit to England are also included.

Among the most striking objects in the gallery is a suit of Japanese samurai armour. The helmet dates from around 1540, while the body armour was produced between about 1700 and 1850. The armour is constructed from lacquered iron plates laced together with silk braid and decorated with horsehair and bear fur. Such armour was worn by members of the samurai, the elite warrior class who served feudal lords known as daimyo and followed a code of honour known as bushido.

Other artefacts displayed in the gallery include musical instruments, ceremonial objects and items of everyday use from a variety of cultures. These range from a West African xylophone and bamboo smoking pipes from Papua New Guinea to writing boards from Nigeria, shadow puppets from Southeast Asia, pottery from Peru and beadwork from southern Africa. Together the objects illustrate the craftsmanship and cultural traditions of communities across the world.

== Activities and learning ==
Saffron Walden Museum provides a range of educational activities and learning programmes for families, schools and community groups. Visitors can explore the museum's collections through a number of self-guided experiences, including trails, interactive displays and hands-on learning opportunities.

Within the galleries, these activities include museum trails and a children's activity map that guides younger visitors through the collections. Several interactive exhibits are incorporated into the displays, such as a Tudor dolls' house in the Furniture Gallery and a model brick-laying activity in the Local History Gallery demonstrating traditional building techniques. In the Great Hall/Early History Gallery, an archaeological sandpit allows visitors to simulate the excavation of artefacts using brushes.

The museum's geology displays include magnifying equipment that allows visitors to examine rocks and fossils in greater detail. The Discovery Centre in the mezzanine section of the Natural History Gallery provides further opportunities for hands-on exploration of the natural history collections, including the use of microscopes.

The museum also offers an educational programme. This includes taught sessions for school groups based on the museum's collections, outreach visits to schools and community venues, and self-guided visits for educational groups. Learning resources are also available online to support teaching and informal study.

In addition, the museum operates a loan box scheme containing real and replica artefacts which can be borrowed by schools, care homes and community groups for educational and reminiscence activities. The museum also hosts temporary family activities during school holidays and supports community participation through initiatives such as the "Your Stories" display programme, which enables local organisations to create exhibitions about their own experiences and histories in north-west Essex.

== Saffron Walden Museum Society ==
The Saffron Walden Museum Society Ltd is a charitable organisation that owns the building and collections of the Saffron Walden Museum. Since local government reorganisation in the 1970s, the day-to-day operation of the museum has been undertaken by Uttlesford District Council, while the Museum Society retains ownership of the building and collections. The museum is therefore managed through a partnership between the council and the society.

In addition to its role as owner of the museum and its collections, the society functions as the museum's supporting or "friends" organisation. It organises lectures, events and other activities for members and the wider public.
