= Ashdon =

Village in Essex, England

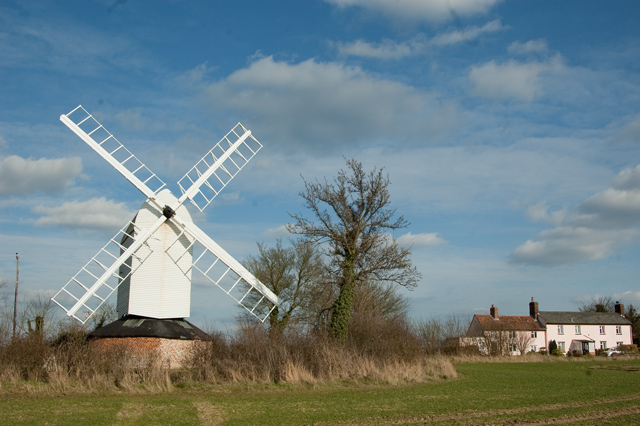
- Ashdon Windmill

- Location within Essex
- Population: 900 (Parish, 2021)
- OS grid reference: TL584421
- Civil parish: Ashdon
- District: Uttlesford
- Shire county: Essex
- Region: East
- Country: England
- Sovereign state: United Kingdom
- Post town: Saffron Walden
- Postcode district: CB10
- Dialling code: 01799
- Police: Essex
- Fire: Essex
- Ambulance: East of England
- UK Parliament: North West Essex

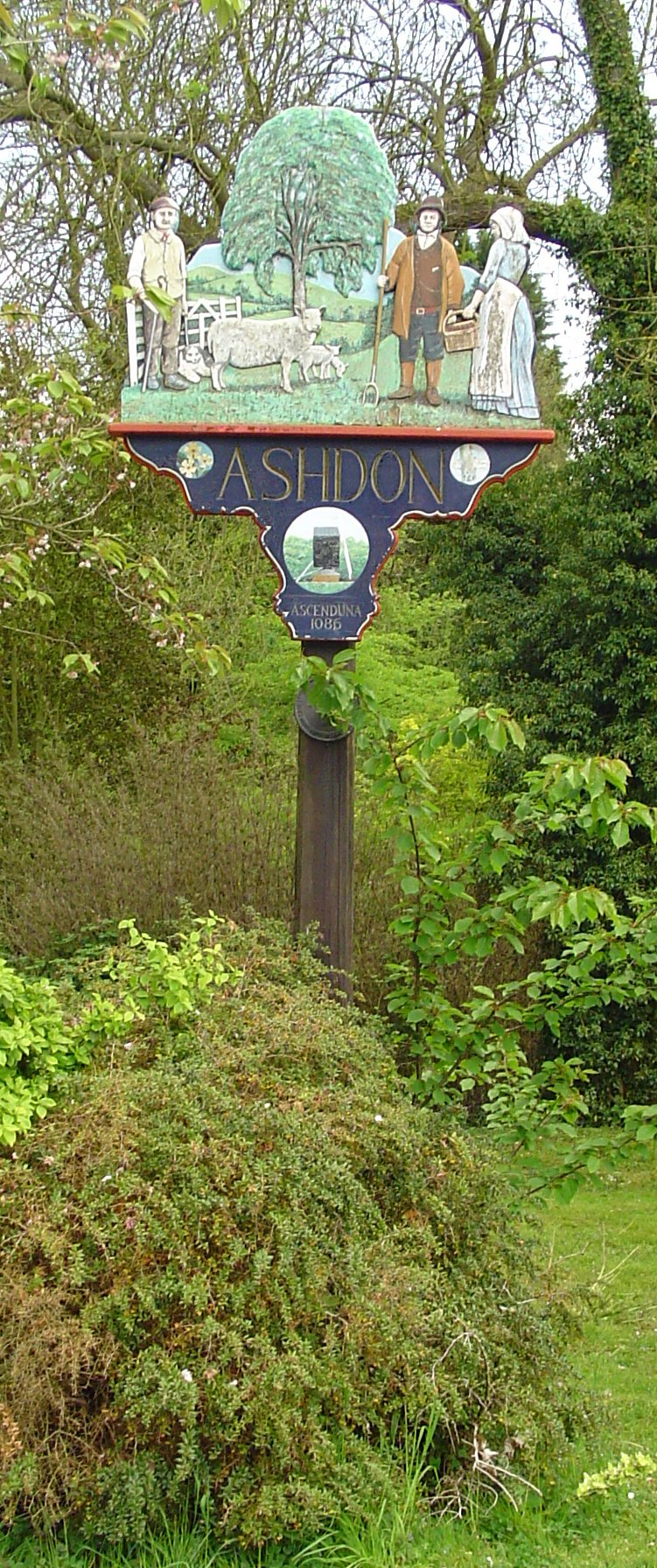
Village sign in Ashdon

Ashdon is a village and civil parish in Essex, England. It is about 4 miles (6 km) north-east of Saffron Walden and 23 miles (37 km) northwest from the county town of Chelmsford. The village is in the district of Uttlesford and the parliamentary constituency of Saffron Walden. It has its own Parish Council. At the 2021 census the parish had a population of 900.

== Geography ==
The village is approximately 4 miles (6 km) northeast of the nearest town, Saffron Walden. It is on the River Bourn, a tributary to the River Granta, a tributary to the River Cam. The village is close to the Essex/Cambridgeshire county border.

Apart from Ashdon village, the parish also includes Steventon End (52°03′47″N 0°19′55″E) and Church End (52°03′01″N 0°18′10″E).

The River Bourn has caused much flooding in recent years to the village of Ashdon in 2000 and 2001 saw heavy winds and rain flood it immensely. On 14 June 2007 the village fell victim to flash flooding when a month's rain fell in an hour causing heavy flooding. Historically, one tenth of Ashdon parish was woodland. In 2018 work on the fitness equipment was completed.

== History ==
At the time of Domesday Book Ashdon was a settlement known as Ascenduna in the ancient hundred of Freshwell.

A notable archaeological find associated with the parish is the Ashdon Hoard , a collection of 71 Viking Age silver pennies dated to around 895. The hoard includes coins of Alfred the Great, Guthrum, Guthred, Charles the Bald and Odo of France, alongside numerous pieces of uncertain mint, and provides important evidence for a late ninth-century bullion economy in East Anglia. It was discovered in 1984 by metal detectorist Bob Spall in woodland near Steventon End, where many of the coins were recovered in fragmentary condition and later reconstructed. Most of the hoard is now held by the Fitzwilliam Museum, with additional coins in the British Museum and the Saffron Walden Museum.

Ashdon has been cited as a potential location [note 1] for a significant battle in 1016, known as the Battle of Assundun. This was a key milestone in the creation of a united England, whereby the Danish King Canute (or Cnut) defeated the English King Edmund II. After the battle King Edmund II ceded England (except Wessex) to Canute. During the summer and autumn of 2016 the Ashdon and Hadstock Millennium Group organised events to mark the event. On 10 September 2016 Waltons Park hosted a re-enactment of the battle which was organised by Ashdon Parish Council, Hadstock village and Saffron Walden Museum, and involved 80 actors In addition to the battle, former archbishop of Canterbury Dr Rowan Williams came to Hadstock church to deliver a commemorative service.

The village is split between the valley settlement and (the) Church End which contains the Guildhall. Originally built on the hill the villagers migrated down the hill to escape the Black Death during the 13th and 14th centuries.

All of the Bartlow Hills were entirely in Ashdon Parish, Essex when the boundary between Cambridgeshire and Essex ran from Steventon End to the River Granta, then along the Granta westwards to Linton, as shown on Ordnance Survey maps including those dated 1805, 1838 and 1882. There is evidence to suggest former vineyards were in operation near to the church. During the reign of Henry VIII the village rector served as a royal chaplain and even officiated his marriage to Anne Boleyn.

As a rural settlement, farming has been a major aspect of village life. So after many years of reduced pay, the farmers formed unions and in 1914, partook in the first agricultural strike. Not only were workers unhappy over pay conditions, which at 13 shillings a week among the lowest paid in the country (just ahead of Buckinghamshire and Oxfordshire), but also the dismissal of workers who had joined the Helions Bumpstead National Agricultural & Rural Workers Union branch, which had formed one year previously. The strikers used the grounds of The Fox (a former pub) to organise protests and host concerts. In addition to the concerts villages organised processions of flags and banners, as well as torch glowings at night. During the strike 70 police officers were drafted in and resulted in 8 workers being sentenced to a month imprisonment in Cambridge, for refusing to pay fines. Initially the workers demanded 16 shillings and for reduced working hours with a half day on Saturday but settled for 15 shillings and £8 for harvest work, bringing the dispute to a close a day before the outbreak of World War I.

Ashdon Halt was a stop (from 1911 to 1964) on the closed Saffron Walden Railway near Church End. The halt was only opened after a long campaign by the village.

In addition to its human history, Ashdon was the site of a rare observed meteorite fall on 9 March 1923. A stony chondrite meteorite weighing approximately 1.3 kg fell in broad daylight near Ashdon Hall Farm, where it was seen striking the ground and subsequently recovered from a depth of about two feet. The find was taken first to the local police and then acquired by the Reverend Francis W. Berry, who donated it to the Natural History Museum in London for scientific examination; it was classified by the Keeper of Minerals George T. Prior and remains part of the Museum’s meteorite collection. A cast of the meteorite is on display at the Saffron Walden Museum, marking one of only a few historically observed meteorite falls in England.

Elizabeth Everitt is commemorated both in the church and on the war memorial who died rescuing an American pilot in 1944. She was posthumously awarded the Albert Medal (then the highest civilian award now replaced with the George Cross).

== Present day ==
Ashdon Primary School, a non-denominational, built in the Victorian Age, for 4–11 year olds is located in the village and has approximately 90 students and had Iain Dale, a Conservative Blogger. Following an initiative to boost student numbers in 2014, the school was still under capacity 4 years later.

In 2013, Ashdon Forest School became the first fully outdoor pre-school to be assessed by Ofsted; it achieved a 2, or "Good" rating.

In 2014, Hideout Leather, an Ashdon clothing manufacturer, was approached to design jackets for Mission: Impossible – Rogue Nation.

The village suffers from speeding, in 2018 over 1,000 vehicles were caught travelling at over 36 mph in a 30 mph zone, as such efforts were made to implement a 20 mph speed limit. However, 18 people picked up 18 bags full of litter (on average 1 bag per person). The WI celebrated its centenary in 2018.

By 2019, all the (27) historic streetlights were modernised.

== Governance ==
An electoral ward in the same name exists. The district ward contains the "Parishes of Ashdon, Hadstock and Sewards End together with the Little Walden ward of Saffron Walden parish." This ward had a population of 1,736 at the 2011 census.

== Sport ==
The village has a cricket team that play at Waltons Park, a football team Ashdon United and a cycling club Ashdon Velo that has hosted numerous cycle events in recent years, including the 2010 Regional Championships.

== Places ==
There is a windmill on the hill, Bragg's Mill, which has been renovated; it is one of the few remaining post mills in Essex. Historically the mill had a brewery and to celebrate the legacy of the mill an Ashdon Amber ale was brewed by Roughacre Brewery in neighbouring Castle Camps. The restored windmill was opened on 23 September 2006 by Patricia Herrmann OBE, Vice Chairman of the Essex Environment Trust. There is also a village museum with information on local history, which was renovated in 2017.

There are three religious centres in the village. These are two churches, All Saints' Church and Ashdon Baptist Church and the Buddhist retreat at Marpa House. Ashdon Baptist Church has been in the village since 1809. The parish church of All Saints dates from the 13th century, with later alterations. It is Grade I listed and supported by The Friends of All Saints who from 2002 to 2017 donated over £100,000 to maintain the building. A church bell is believed to be over 500 years old and in 1969 were restored after 90 years of absence. Marpa House Buddhist retreat was established in 1973 and is run by the Dharma Trust and practices the Karma Kagyu tradition of Tibetan Buddhism. Businesses include a haunted pub (The Rose and Crown which was frequented by Cromwell), as well as many farms.

== Notes ==
1 There is dispute over whether battle occurred in North West Essex, in the area around Ashdon, or in South East Essex, in the area around Ashingdon (near Rochford).

== See also ==
- The Hundred Parishes
- Ashdon Hoard
