= Saffron Walden railway station =

Disused railway station in Essex, England

Saffron Walden
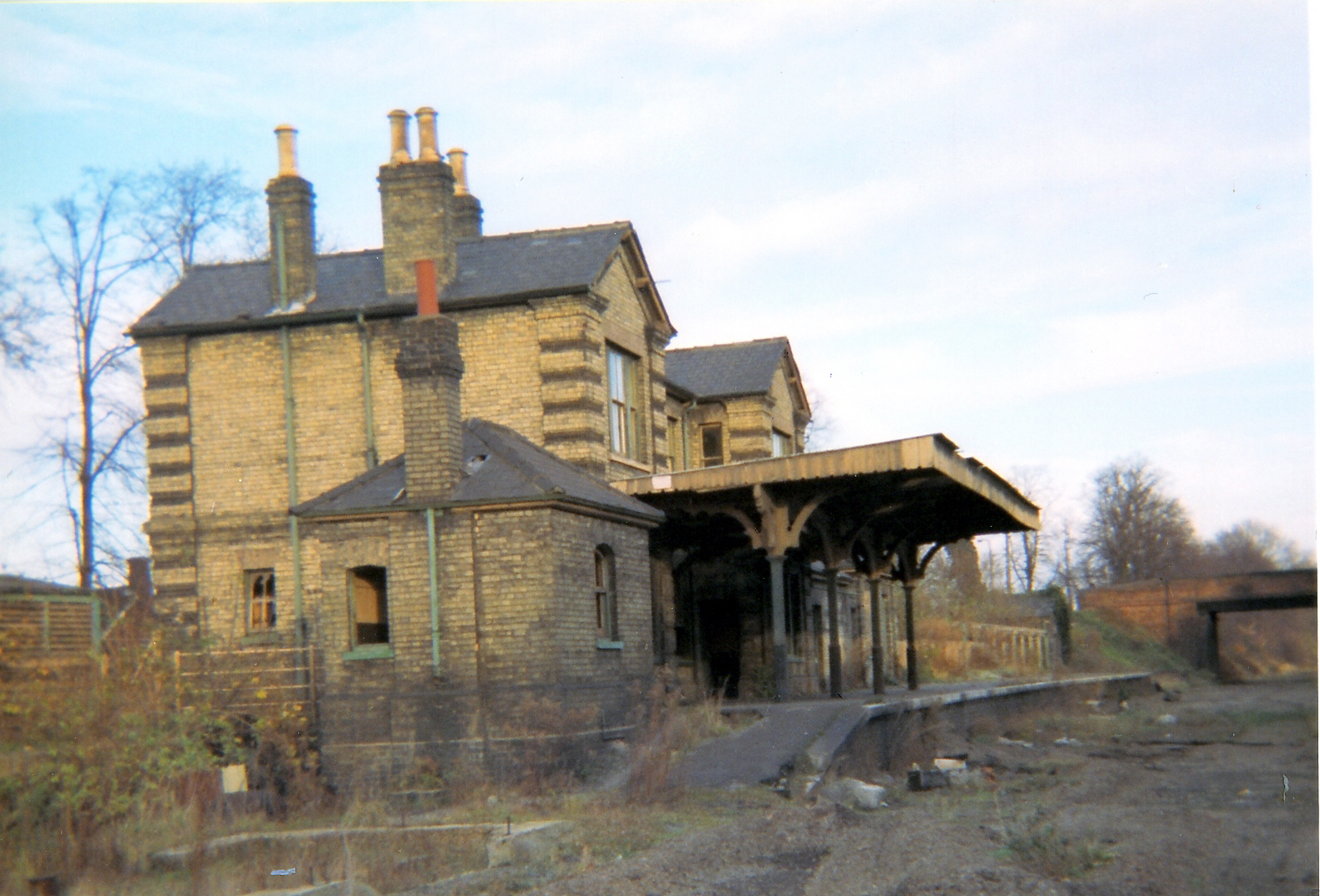
- The station in 1970

General information
- Location: Saffron Walden, Uttlesford, England
- Coordinates: 52.0192°N 0.2433°E
- Grid reference: TL540380
- Platforms: 1

Other information
- Status: Disused

History
- Original company: Saffron Walden Railway
- Pre-grouping: Great Eastern Railway
- Post-grouping: London and North Eastern Railway

Key dates
- 23 November 1865: Opened
- 7 September 1964: Closed to passengers
- 28 December 1964: Closed to goods
Location

Saffron Walden railway station served the town of Saffron Walden, in Essex, England, between 1865 and 1964. It lay 43 miles 43 chains (43.5 mi; 70.1 km) down the line from London Liverpool Street, on the Saffron Walden Railway branch line between Audley End and Bartlow.

== History ==
The station was opened by the Saffron Walden Railway on 23 November 1865 and it was initially the branch line's terminus as Bartlow station had not yet been completed.

After the Second World War, railway traffic began to decline and, by the 1950s, the increase in car ownership led to a dramatic loss of revenue. The line and the station were closed to passengers on 7 September 1964 and to freight three months later.

Preceding station	Disused railways	Following station
Acrow Halt	Great Eastern Railway; Saffron Walden Railway	Audley End

== The site today ==
The station yard has been developed for housing, with the station building being retained and converted into private dwellings; a housing access road runs along the trackbed.

Since the station's closure, the nearest station to Walden is Audley End which lies on the West Anglia Main Line.
