= Bragg's Mill =

Bragg's Mill may refer to:

- West Memphis, Arkansas, known as Bragg's Mill until 1927
- Bragg's Mill, Ashdon, a windmill in Essex, England
