= Acrow Halt railway station =

Disused railway station in Saffron Walden, Essex

Acrow Halt
- Acrow Halt, circa 1958

General information
- Location: Saffron Walden, Uttlesford; England
- Coordinates: 52.0269°N 0.2641°E
- Grid reference: TL554389
- Platforms: 1

Other information
- Status: Disused

History
- Original company: Eastern Region of British Railways
- Post-grouping: Eastern Region of British Railways

Key dates
- 25 March 1957: Station opens
- 7 September 1964: Station closes
Location

Acrow Halt was a railway station on the Saffron Walden Railway. Located at the north-eastern edge of Saffron Walden, Essex, the station was close to the Coronation Works of Acrow Engineering Ltd., which it served between 1957 and 1964. The station was approximately 44 miles 27 chains (71.35 km) from London Liverpool Street station.

== History ==
Acrow railway station was named after the nearby Acrow Works. The name Acrow derived from the name of Arthur Crow, the solicitor of William Aphonse de Vigier who was the owner of the factory and the inventor of the Acrow prop. Opened by the Eastern Region of British Railways on 25 March 1957, it was then closed by the British Railways Board on 7 September 1964, after a short existence of seven years.

Preceding station	Disused railways	Following station
Ashdon Halt	Eastern Region of British Railways; Saffron Walden Railway	Saffron Walden

== Sources ==
- "Disused Stations". Subterranea Britannica.
- Butt, R. V. J. (October 1995). The Directory of Railway Stations: details every public and private passenger station, halt, platform and stopping place, past and present (1st ed.). Sparkford: Patrick Stephens Ltd. ISBN 978-1-85260-508-7. OCLC 60251199. OL 11956311M.
- Jowett, Alan (2000). Jowett's Nationalised Railway Atlas (1st ed.). Penryn, Cornwall: Atlantic Transport Publishers. ISBN 978-0-906899-99-1. OCLC 228266687.
