= William Bragg =

William Bragg may refer to:

- Billy Bragg (born 1957), English musician
- Will Bragg (born 1986), Welsh cricketer
- William Henry Bragg (1862–1942), 1915 Nobel Prize–winning physicist (joint, with his son)
- William Lawrence Bragg (1890–1971), 1915 Nobel Prize–winning physicist (joint, with his father)
- William John Bragg (1858–1941), Ontario farmer and political figure
- William Bragge (1822–1882), English civil engineer and antiquarian
- William Bragg's Mill, Ashdon
