= Nunn Wood =

Woodland in Essex, England

Coordinates: 52.062°N 0.277°E

- Site of Special Scientific Interest
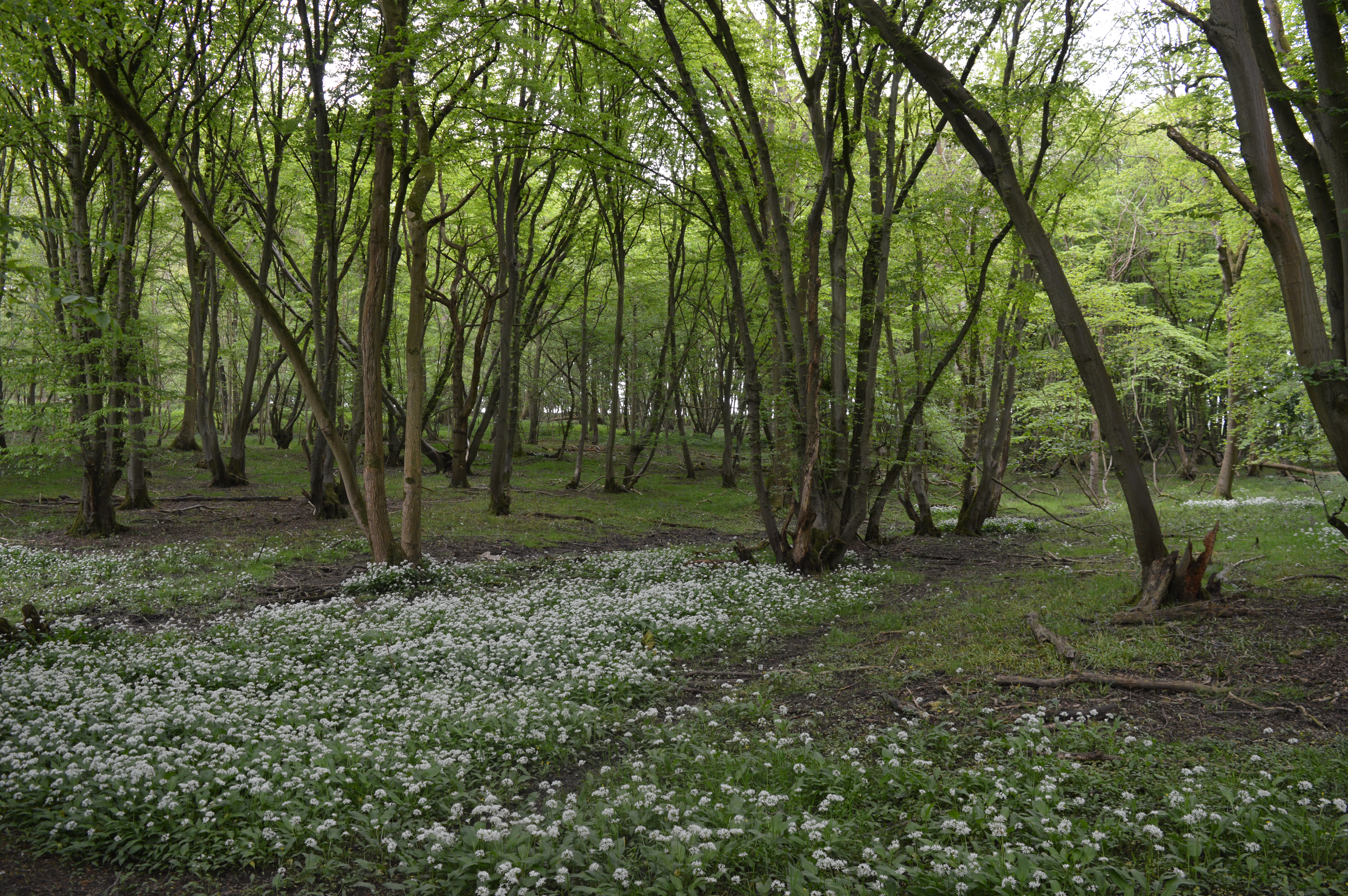
- Location of Nunn Wood.
- Area of search: Essex
- Grid reference: TL563429
- Interest: Biological
- Area: 9.7 ha (24 acres)
- Notification date: 1986
- Location map: Magic Map

Nunn Wood is a 9.7-hectare (24-acre) biological Site of Special Scientific Interest between Great Chesterford and Ashdon in Essex, England.

The site is an ancient coppice wood on chalky boulder clay. It is mainly hornbeam with other trees such as pedunculate oak, ash and field maple. The understorey is dominated by bluebells and dog's mercury. Ramsons are common, and there are occasional orchids. The site has the nationally uncommon oxlip, and one of the largest colonies of early purple orchids.

A footpath from Bowsers Lane goes through the wood.
