= Ashdon Halt railway station =

Disused railway station in Ashdon, Uttlesford

Coordinates: 52.0511°N 0.2946°E

Ashdon Halt
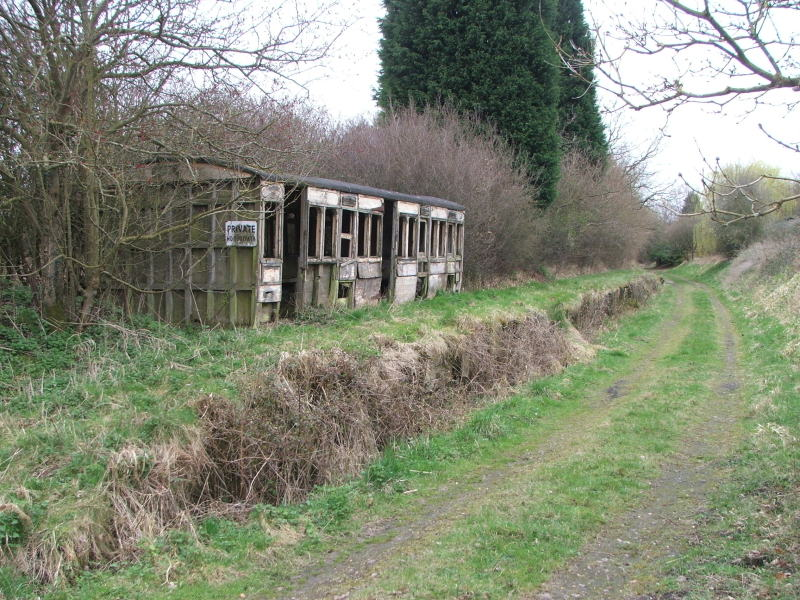
- Ashdon Halt in March 2009

General information
- Location: Ashdon, Uttlesford; England
- Platforms: 1

Other information
- Status: Disused

History
- Original company: Great Eastern Railway
- Pre-grouping: Great Eastern Railway
- Post-grouping: London and North Eastern Railway

Key dates
- 14 August 1911: Station opens
- 7 September 1964: Station closes
Location

Ashdon Halt was a railway station on the Saffron Walden Railway. It opened 14 August 1911 and closed 7 September 1964. The halt was approximately 46 miles 44 chains (74.91 km) from London Liverpool Street station.

== History ==
After many campaigns by villagers Ashdon Halt was finally opened by the Great Eastern Railway, it became part of the London and North Eastern Railway during the Grouping of 1923. Passing on to the Eastern Region of British Railways on nationalisation in 1948, it was then closed by the British Railways Board.

Preceding station	Disused railways	Following station
Bartlow	Saffron Walden Railway	Acrow Halt

== Sources ==
- "Disused Stations". Subterranea Britannica.
- Butt, R. V. J. (October 1995). The Directory of Railway Stations: details every public and private passenger station, halt, platform and stopping place, past and present (1st ed.). Sparkford: Patrick Stephens Ltd. ISBN 978-1-85260-508-7. OCLC 60251199. OL 11956311M.
- Jowett, Alan (2000). Jowett's Nationalised Railway Atlas (1st ed.). Penryn, Cornwall: Atlantic Transport Publishers. ISBN 978-0-906899-99-1. OCLC 228266687.
