= Bartlow =

Village in Cambridgeshire, England

Coordinates: 52.083°N 0.316°E

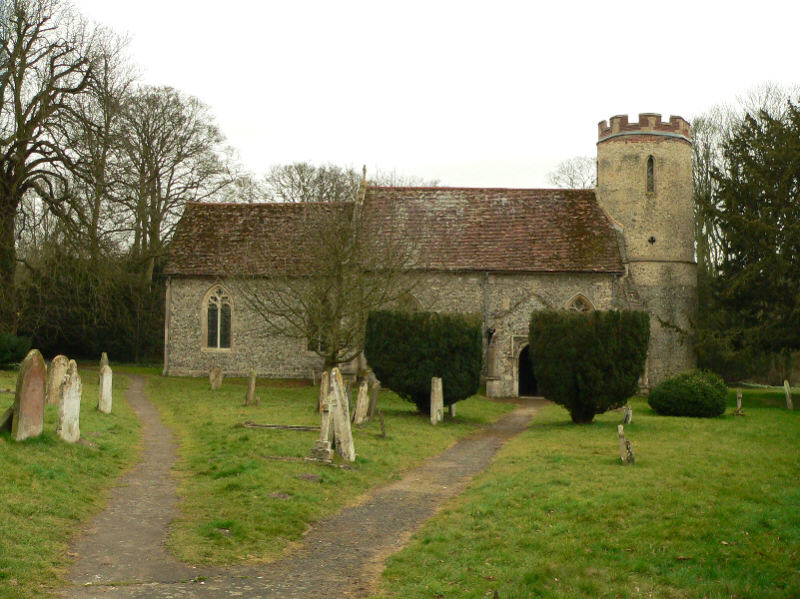
- Bartlow St. Mary

- Location within Cambridgeshire
- Population: 110 (including Horseheath)
- District: South Cambridgeshire
- Shire county: Cambridgeshire
- Region: East
- Country: England
- Sovereign state: United Kingdom
- Post town: CAMBRIDGE
- Postcode district: CB21
- Dialling code: 01223

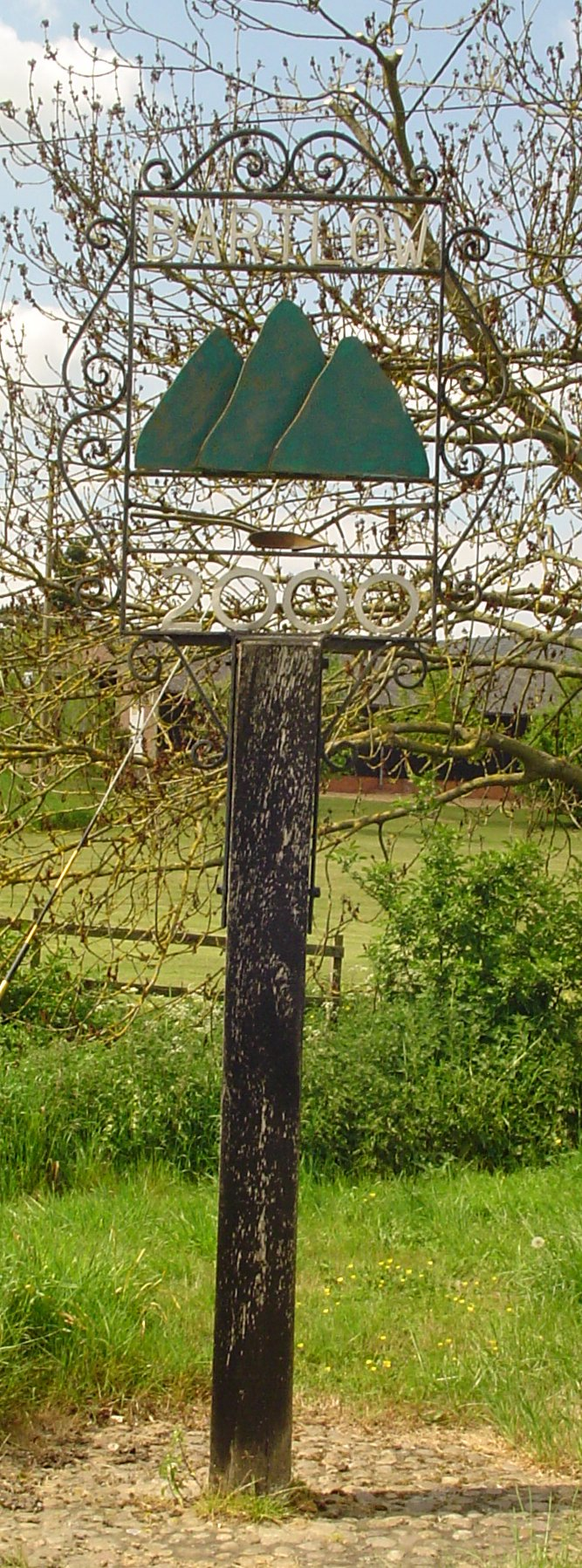
Village sign in Bartlow, depicting three of the Bartlow Hills

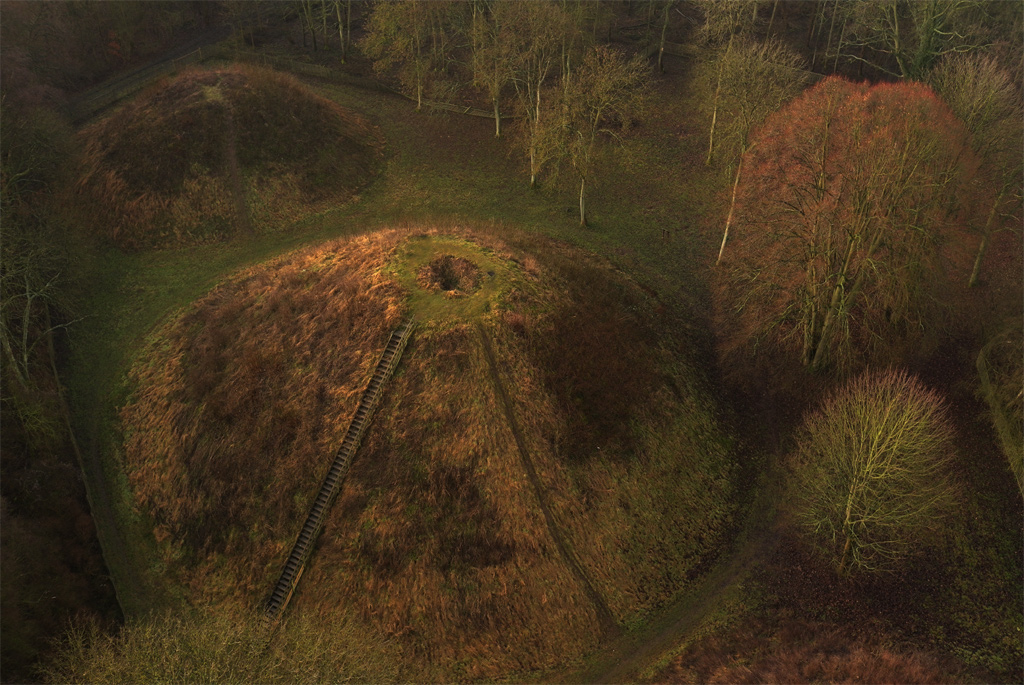
Aerial photo of the Bartlow Hills, taken by Bill Blake

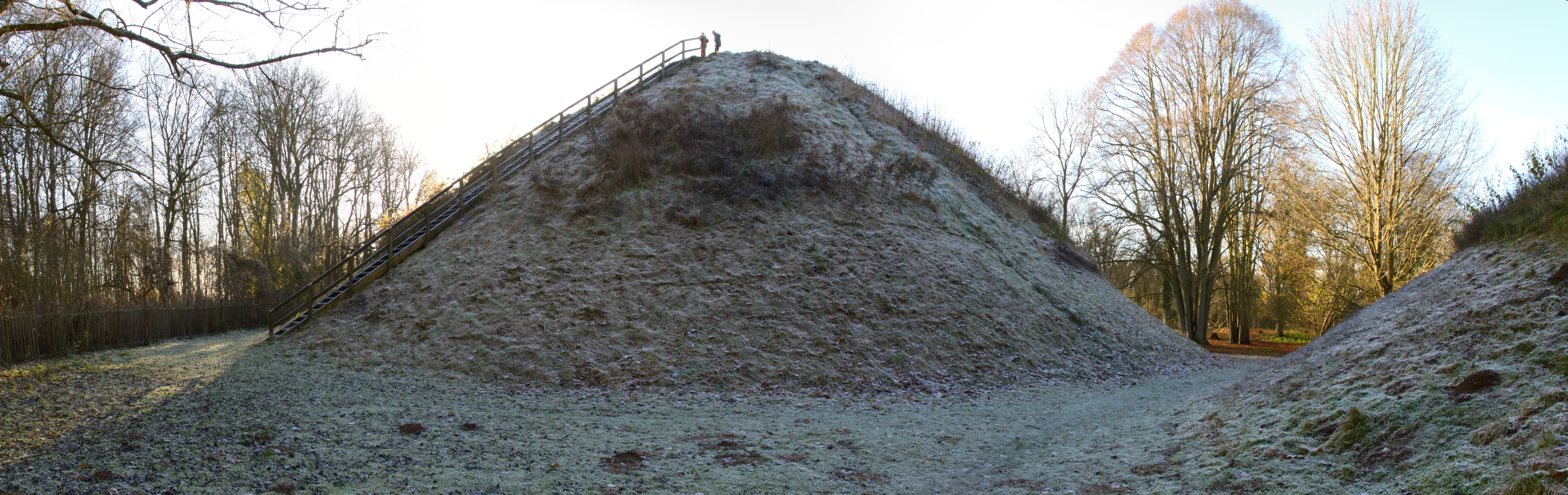
Side view of one of the mounds

Bartlow is a small village and civil parish in the South Cambridgeshire district of Cambridgeshire, England, about 12 miles (19 km) south-east of Cambridge and 7 miles (11 km) west of Haverhill in Suffolk. The River Granta runs through the village. In 2021 the parish had a population of 101.

== History ==
At 385 acres (156 ha) Bartlow is one of the smallest parishes in Cambridgeshire. Its southern border, which was partially straightened on a few successive occasions to follow the former railway line, divides it from Ashdon parish in Essex. It also has borders with the neighbouring parishes of Castle Camps and Shudy Camps to the east, Horseheath to the north, and Linton to the west.

Though the area has been occupied since Roman times, there is no record of Bartlow itself as a village until 1232, largely because the settlement south of the River Granta with its Roman burial mounds was part of Ashdon parish nearby in Essex.

Recorded as Berkelawe in 1232, the name "Bartlow" means "mounds or tumuli where birch trees grow".

=== Bartlow Hills ===
Bartlow is also home to Bartlow Hills, a Roman tumuli cemetery with four remaining mounds, though only one falls into the parish of Bartlow. Originally, all of the Bartlow Hills were in Essex County and were part of the parish of Ashdon, a village in Essex (1.5 miles south), when the boundary between Cambridgeshire and Essex ran from Steventon End to the River Granta, then along the Granta westwards to Linton, as shown on ordnance survey maps including those dated 1805, 1838 and 1882.

There were originally seven Bartlow mounds. The tallest at 15 metres in height is the largest barrow north of the Alps.

For centuries the mounds were believed to cover the bodies of those killed at the Battle of Assandun in 1016, but excavation demonstrated that they are the graves of a wealthy family and date from the 1st or 2nd century AD. Excavations in the 19th century found large wooden chests, decorated vessels in bronze, glass and pottery and an iron folding chair, most of which were lost in a later fire at Bartlow Hall. A small Roman villa, occupied until the late 4th century, was situated north of the mounds and was excavated in 1852.

== Church ==
It has long been maintained that the church in Bartlow was built by King Cnut near a possible site of the Battle of Assandun, but no evidence for a building of that age has been found; another likelier possibility is that the church in question is St Andrew's in Ashingdon, Essex. The present parish church of Bartlow, dedicated to St Mary, consists of a chancel, a nave with north porch, and a circular west tower. The tower is all that remains of what is believed to be the original church and dates from the late 11th or early 12th century. The nave and chancel were built in the 14th century.

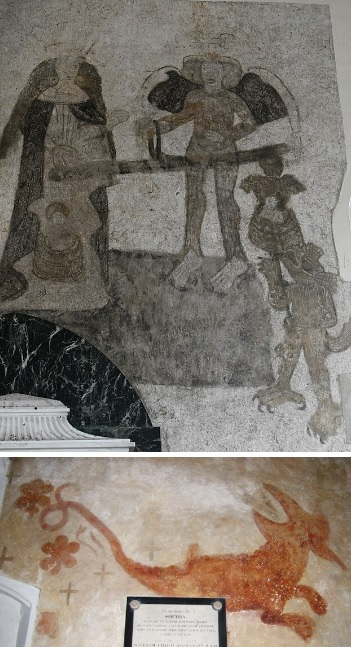
Wall paintings in Bartlow church, top: St Michael weighing souls, below: the dragon (of St George)

Bartlow St. Mary is one of only two existing round-tower churches in Cambridgeshire, the other one being located in Snailwell. There are three bells in the tower, all cast by William Chamberlain in 1440, and the earliest in the country still hung in their original frame. The first and second bells' weights are unknown but the tenor (largest) is 9 cwt. Due to the frame being unsafe, they are not rung full circle.

The church is also known for its 15th-century wall-paintings whose fragments include depictions of St Christopher, St Michael weighing souls, and St George and the Dragon. There is also a memorial to Benjamin Keene (1753–1837) of Westoe Hall who sat in the House of Commons from 1776-1784.

== Village life ==
The village has one remaining pub; the Three Hills pub was open by 1847 and is housed in a 17th-century building. Bartlow was listed as having two alehouses in 1682. The Three Hills pub was sold and underwent a major renovation. The pub is now open again having been refurbished and is the recipient of multiple awards.

== Railways ==
The railway reached the village in 1865 when the Stour Valley line from Great Shelford to Haverhill opened, running along the southern edge of the parish, with a secondary line on the Saffron Walden Railway branching at Bartlow opening in 1866. Bartlow railway station was open at the railway bridge on Ashdon Road until closing when the Haverhill line was axed in 1967. The station is now a private house called Booking Hall.

== See also ==
- The Hundred Parishes
