= Audley End railway station =

Railway station in Essex, England

Audley End
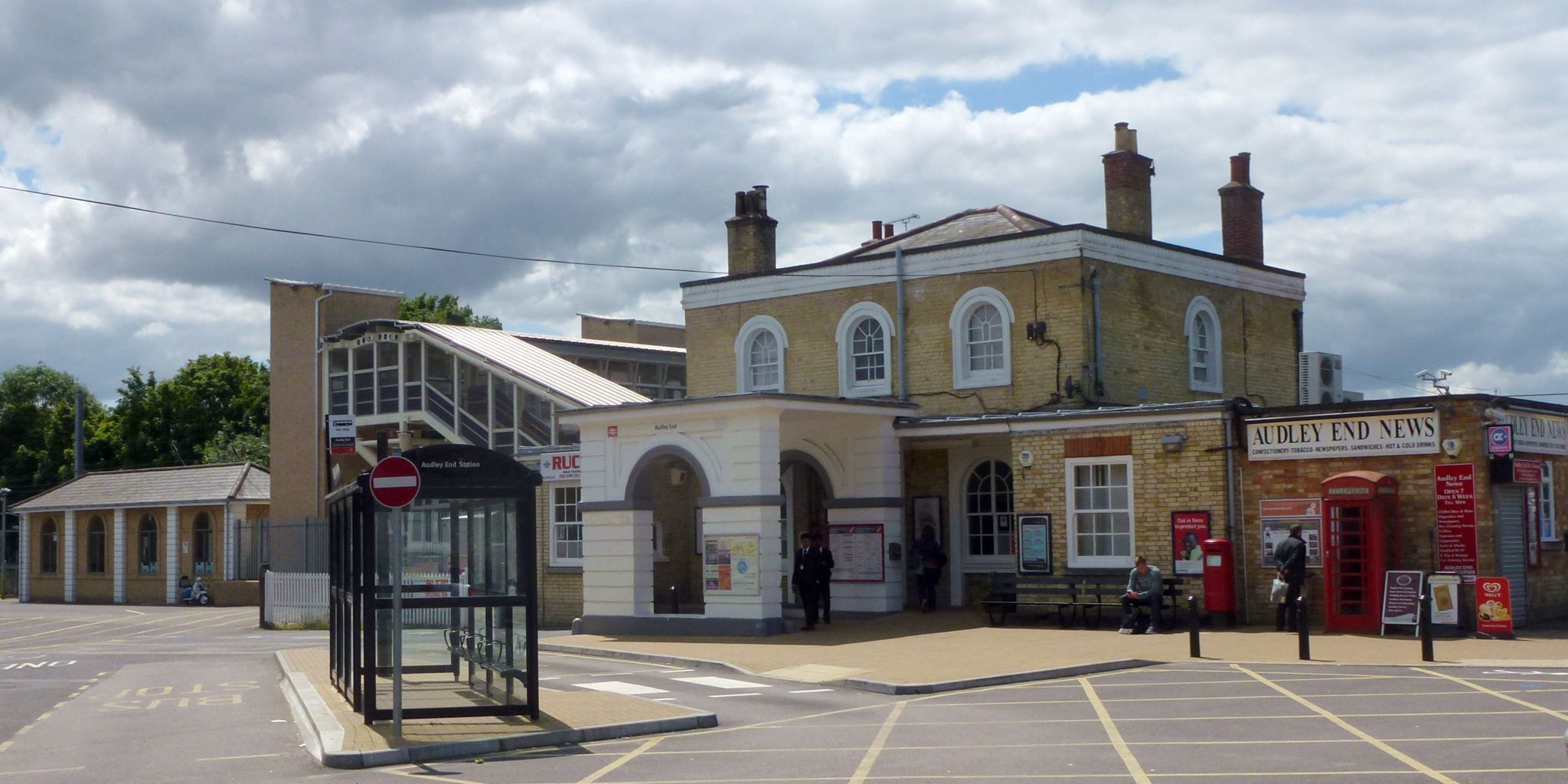
- Audley End station in 2012

General information
- Location: Wendens Ambo, District of Uttlesford, England
- Coordinates: 52.0045°N 0.2073°E
- Grid reference: TL516363
- Managed by: Greater Anglia
- Platforms: 2

Other information
- Station code: AUD
- Classification: DfT category D

Key dates
- 30 July 1845: Opened as Wenden
- 1 November 1848: Renamed Audley End

Passengers
- 2020/21: ▼0.173 million
- Interchange: ▼812
- 2021/22: ▲0.503 million
- Interchange: ▲2,883
- 2022/23: ▲0.624 million
- Interchange: ▲3,349
- 2023/24: ▲0.751 million
- Interchange: ▲4,653
- 2024/25: ▲0.814 million
- Interchange: ▲5,000
Location
Notes
- Passenger statistics from the Office of Rail and Road

Audley End railway station serves the village of Wendens Ambo and the market town of Saffron Walden, in Essex, England. It lies on the West Anglia Main Line, 41 miles 55 chains (67.1 km) down the line from London Liverpool Street; it is situated between Newport and Great Chesterford. The station is managed by Greater Anglia, which also operates the large majority of services that call here.

== History ==
The station was opened in 1845 by the Eastern Counties Railway, which was absorbed into the Great Eastern Railway, and became part of the London and North Eastern Railway during the Grouping of 1923. The station passed on to the Eastern Region of British Railways upon nationalisation in 1948.

From 1865, the station also served as a junction with the branch line to Saffron Walden that began here and extended as far as Bartlow station where it met the Stour Valley Railway. As a cost-cutting measure, diesel railbuses were introduced on the branch line in 1958; despite their success, the line was recommended for closure in the 1963 Beeching Report. It was closed in 1964. There used to be a platform at the eastern end of the station (Note: The location of the former platform is: 52.0043°N 0.2077°E) for terminating trains to and from Saffron Walden.

The station was served by Network SouthEast when BR sectorisation was introduced in the 1980s, until the privatisation of British Rail.

Audley End station's name was changed on signs to Audley End for Saffron Walden in 2012. Sir Alan Haselhurst, MP for Saffron Walden, unveiled the rebranded signs on 25 May.

== Services ==
The large majority of services at Audley End are operated by Greater Anglia, using Class 720 electric multiple units and Class 755 bi-mode trains.

The typical off-peak service pattern in trains per hour (tph) is:

- 2 tph to London Liverpool Street (1 semi-fast, 1 stopping)
- 1 tph to Stansted Airport
- 2 tph to Cambridge North
- 1 tph to Norwich, via Thetford.

During the peak hours, the station is served by an additional 2tph between Liverpool Street and Cambridge/Ely, in addition to a small number of early morning and late evening CrossCountry-operated services between Stansted Airport and Birmingham New Street.

Preceding station	National Rail	Following station
Newport or Bishop's Stortford	Greater Anglia West Anglia Main Line	Great Chesterford or Whittlesford Parkway
Stansted Airport	Greater Anglia West Anglia Main Line Stansted Airport branch	Whittlesford Parkway
Stansted Airport	CrossCountry Birmingham to Stansted Airport Limited service	Cambridge
	Disused railways	
Saffron Walden	Great Eastern Railway Saffron Walden Railway	Terminus
