= John Ernest Bode =

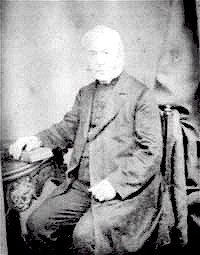
John Ernest Bode

John Ernest Bode (13 February 1816 – 6 October 1874) was an Anglican priest, educator, poet, and hymnist.

== Life ==
Born in London, he was the son of William Bode. He educated at Eton, the Charter House, and then at Christ Church, Oxford where he received his B.A. in 1837 and a M.A. three years later. He won the Hertford Scholarship.

He was ordained in 1841 and became Rector of Westwell, Oxfordshire in 1847, then of Castle Camps, Cambridgeshire, 1860. He was also for a time tutor of his college, and classical examiner.

Bode was married with three children. One of his children was Alice Mary Bode who also wrote Christian hymns; most famously, "Once pledged by the Cross".

He died in Castle Camps, 6 October 1874 aged 58, and was buried near the hedge facing the West Window.

== Published works ==
His Bampton Lectures were delivered in 1855. He also published Ballads from Herodotus, with an introductory poem; Hymns from the Gospel of the Day for each Sunday and Festivals of our Lord; and Short Occasional Poems. His hymns include O Jesus, I have promised, Sweetly the Sabbath Bell, God of Heaven enthroned in Might, and Spirit of Truth, Indwelling Light.

He wrote "O Jesus I Have Promised" on the occasion of the confirmation of his own two sons and daughter at Castle Camps in 1869. The hymn tune was written in 1881 by Arthur Henry Mann, who at one period in his life served as organist and choirmaster at King's College, Cambridge, famous for its superb choral music.

A letter written by him in support of Osborne Gordon is held in the Papers of Osborne Gordon collection at Oxford.
