= Waggon- und Maschinenbau GmbH Donauwörth railbus =

Single-car diesel passenger trains

Waggon und Maschinenbau GmbH Donauworth railbus
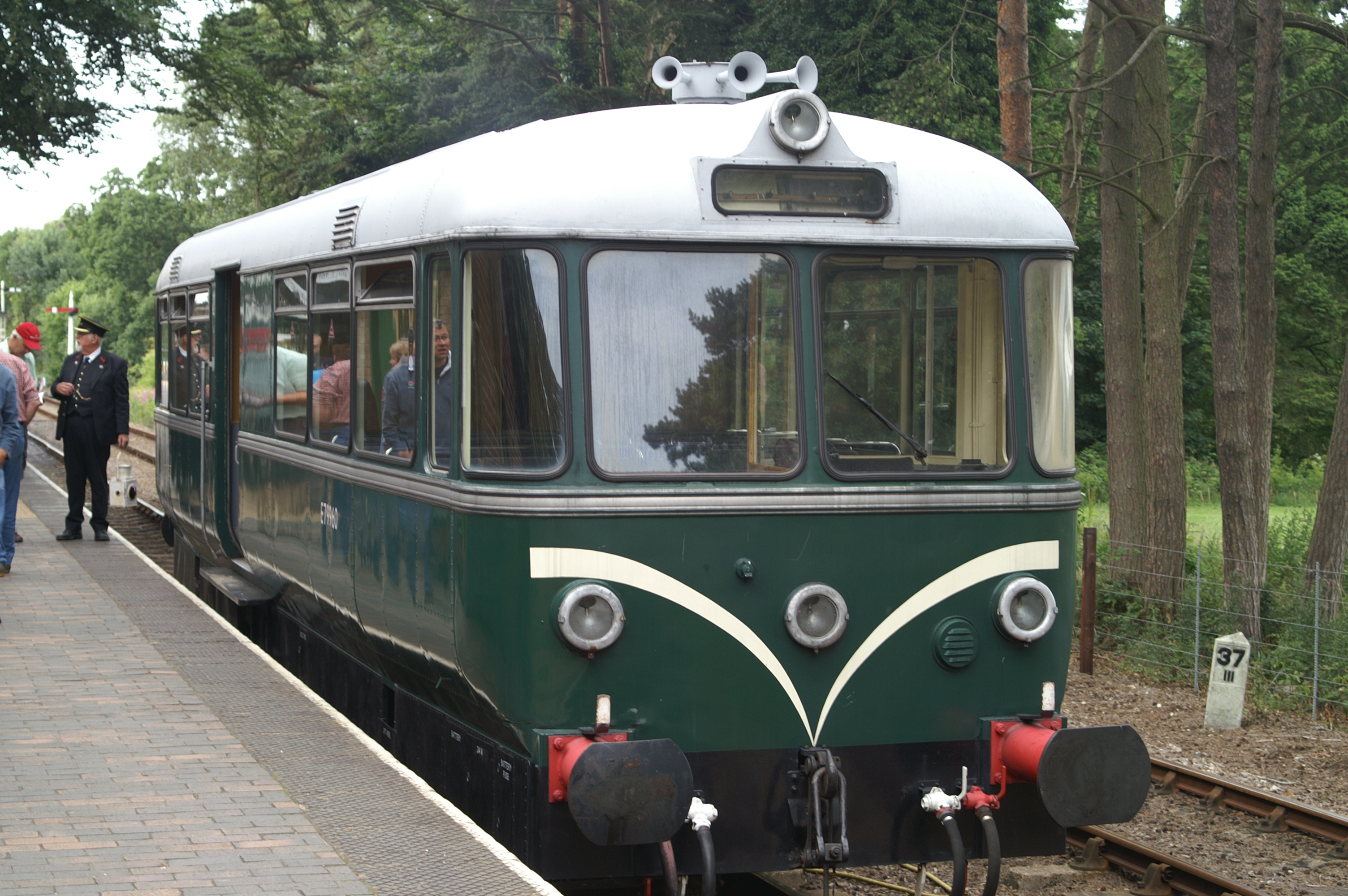
- A Waggon und Maschinenbau railbus at Holt, North Norfolk Railway
- In service: 1958-1967
- Manufacturer: de:Waggon- und Maschinenbau GmbH Donauwörth
- Family name: Railbus
- Replaced: Steam locomotives and carriages
- Scrapped: 1968 (Note: Only one railbus scrapped.)
- Number built: 5
- Number preserved: 4
- Number scrapped: 1
- Formation: Railbus
- Capacity: 56
- Operator: British Railways
- Lines served: Witham–Maldon branch line; Braintree Branch Line; Saffron Walden Railway

Specifications
- Car length: 41 ft 10 in (12.75 m) (over body), 45 ft 9 3/4 in (13.964 m) (over buffers)
- Width: 8 ft 4 3/8 in (2.550 m) (over panels)
- Height: 11 ft 9 in (3.58 m)
- Maximum speed: 55 mph (89 km/h)
- Weight: 15 tonnes (14.8 long tons; 16.5 short tons)
- Traction system: Six-speed electro mechanical gearbox
- Prime mover: Buessing
- Engine type: 6-cylinder horizontal
- Power output: 150 hp (110 kW) at 1,900 rpm
- Track gauge: 1,435 mm (4 ft 8 1/2 in) standard gauge

The five British Railways Waggon und Maschinenbau railbuses were delivered to the UK in April 1958. They were based at Cambridge until 1964, and were withdrawn in 1966-67. Four have been preserved.

== Background ==
The WMD railbuses were five of the total of 22 delivered in 1958 from five manufacturers. (Note: The rest were British manufacturers.) They were planned to have extensive trials. The underframe, power equipment, transmission and brake gear were similar to the Uerdingen railbus, common on the German Federal Railway. They were shipped via the Harwich-Zeebrugge train ferry. It was hoped they might be the answer to stem increasing losses on rural branch-lines.

In the first year after their introduction, they saved £66,000 in operating costs; however, the branches were still losing £4,000 a year. (Note: This equates to £84,000 at July 2026 prices.) At the time, such losses were unacceptable and the lines they worked were closed.

== Construction ==
The underframes were built of channel shaped cross-beams welded to flanged plate longitudinal girders. The corrugated steel floor was welded on top.

The body was formed of alloy panels, rivetted on a light steel frame; roof plates were crimped to increase rigidity. The body was suspended from four points on the frame, connected by hydraulic shock absorbers.

Unlike most British Railways diesel units, the accelerator was foot controlled, with power-operated central doors and air-powered disc brakes.

== Operation ==
Initially, the railbuses worked the Maldon, Braintree and Saffron Walden branch lines. They had too few seats for the Braintree branch and were used on the Mildenhall line from July 1958 until its closure in 1962. E79961/3/4 had their Buessing engines replaced by AEC A220X engines, also of 150 hp, in 1962-3 due to the cost of importing replacements from Germany. Their other branches closed in 1964, after which they spent most of their time in store at Cambridge.

In 1965, 79963 and 79964 were trialled on the Alston Line, but could not haul parcels vans and had heating problems in winter. 79961 and 79964 were transferred to serve Millers Dale in 1966, but that branch closed in 1967. M79961 was the last to be withdrawn in August 1967 and was scrapped at Rotherham in 1968.

== Preservation ==
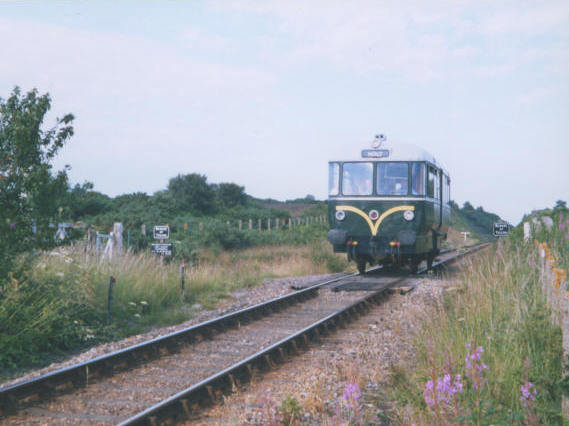
E79963 at Windpump crossing, near to Kelling Heath Halt, on the North Norfolk Railway (2001)

The other four railbuses have been preserved and have been transferred a number of times between heritage railways. In 1966, 79960/63 were sold to the Midland & Great Northern Joint Railway Society (later North Norfolk Railway). In 1976, 79963's AEC engine failed and was replaced. 79962/64 were bought by the Keighley and Worth Valley Railway in 1967. To solve a problem with them slipping, the carriages were turned around so that the driving axle was at the rear on the uphill runs.

Vehicle no.	Location	Comments
79960	Ribble Steam Railway	Operational.
79962	Keighley and Worth Valley Railway	Under extensive overhaul.
79963	East Anglia Railway Museum	Operational.
79964	Keighley and Worth Valley Railway	Operational.
