= Waldstock Festival UK =

Annual music festival in Essex, United Kingdom

Coordinates: 52.006509°N 0.211458°E

Waldstock Festival
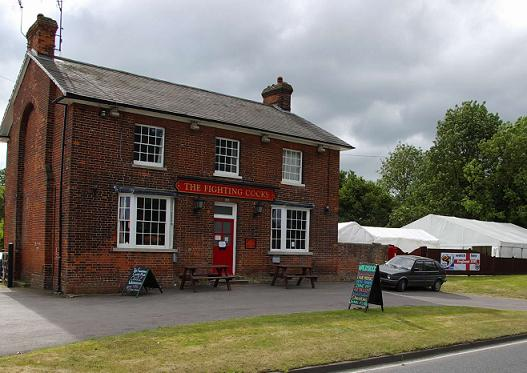
- The Fighting Cocks, Essex (I. Boatman)
- Frequency: annually
- Locations: Wendens Ambo, Essex
- Inaugurated: 19 June 2010

Waldstock is an annual charity music festival held in the grounds of the Fighting Cocks Public House, Wendens Ambo, Essex. Waldstock is organised entirely by volunteers, many of them musicians themselves, and the bands who appear give their time totally free of charge.

== Founding ==
The idea for Waldstock began after a previous event at the venue, organised by an independent third-party, was not given license to go ahead by the council in May 2010. A small committee of local musicians and music fans put the event together in just five weeks, and it was held on 19 and 20 June 2010.

The first festival received an excellent response from local people, as the local press reported; "Hundreds of music lovers attended the two day Waldstock charity music festival...they were treated to some of the finest bands in the area, including Dennis Stratton & Tommy Dunn, Supercasino, Another Storm, Aliceband, This Way Up, and The Wrinklies."

== Fundraising ==
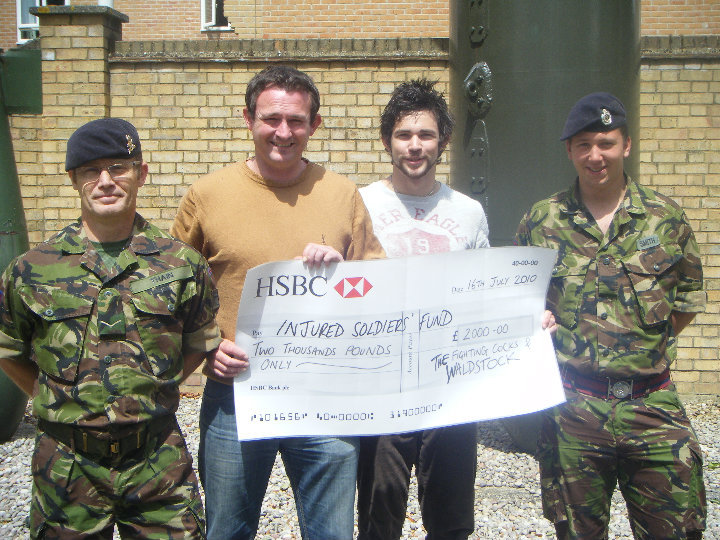
Waldstock reps present cheque to soldiers of Carver Barracks (2010)

Waldstock's primary aim apart from promoting local music and arts, is to raise money for local charitable causes.

In 2011 the principle charitable beneficiary was the emergency first response team, "MEDICS".

Waldstock also supported two other local, smaller, charitable causes in 2011.

In 2010, the event raised £2,500, donating £2,000 to Carver Barracks’ Injured Soldiers’ Fund, and guitars (worth £500) to Uttlesford Youth Music Project, based at Fairycroft centre, Saffron Walden.

== Bands ==
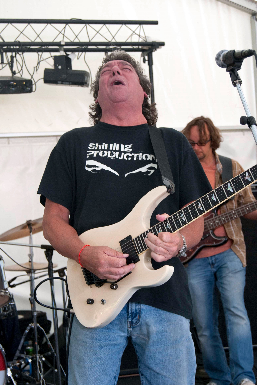
Dennis Stratton, ex-Iron Maiden (D. Watkinson)

Waldstock relies on the input and performances of local and regional bands who give their time and music freely. In 2011 the festival had a lineup of over 25 bands, including: Zocalo, Guardians of Andromeda, Ivan & The Wolves, She Makes War, The Pins, The Strangerhood, AlicebanD, and Gema Hadridge.
