= Elizabeth Everitt =

Recipient of the Albert Medal

Elizabeth Everitt (d. 1944) was posthumously awarded the Albert Medal for Lifesaving after she was killed while attempting to rescue a number of American servicemen from a Douglas A-20 Havoc bomber that crashed near her home in Essex after colliding with another aircraft of the same flight.

== Death ==
In May 1944, Everitt, a recently widowed nurse, was out milking cows at her farm in Ashdon near Saffron Walden when a US Havoc bomber crashed in a nearby field. She ran over to the crash site and managed to pull one of the US servicemen clear. However, when she returned to try to rescue another, two of the bombs aboard the aircraft exploded and she was killed and she was found dead with her arms around a dead serviceman.

== Commemoration ==
She was buried 30 May 1944 in Ashdon Cemetery. Thirty members of the USAAF were amongst the mourners at her funeral. Their commanding officer spoke of Mrs Everitt's "noble and courageous effort." Adding: "Her action symbolises and strengthens the tie of unity and faith which binds English and Americans so closely as they fight together for the protection and preservation of our common faith and ideals."

Everitt was posthumously awarded the Albert Medal on 10 July 1944, the citation read:

The KING has been pleased to approve that the Albert Medal be awarded posthumously to Mrs Elizabeth Anne Everitt in recognition of the conspicuous gallantry she displayed in her efforts to rescue the crew of a burning aircraft which crashed, loaded with bombs, into a field near her home. Two of the bombs subsequently exploded, killing her instantly.

The following year her young son, Anthony, received her medal from the King at Buckingham Palace.

She is commemorated on a tablet in All Saints' Church, Ashdon, alongside First World War and Second World War servicemen and on a Portland stone plaque latter added to the Ashdon war memorial.
