= Jabez Gibson =

Businessman based in Saffron Walden, Essex

Jabez Gibson (1794–1838) was a prominent businessman based in Saffron Walden, Essex who played a significant role in the foundation of Saffron Walden Museum acting as the first chairman of the Saffron Walden Natural History Society.

== Early life ==
Jabez was born in 1794, the son of Atkinson Francis Gibson and Elizabeth Wyatt.

== Jabez Gibson and the founding of Saffron Walden Museum ==
Jabez Gibson played a central role in the establishment of what became the Saffron Walden Museum one of the oldest purpose-built museums in Britain.

The museum originated with the formation of the Saffron Walden Natural History Society in 1832 The earliest recorded meeting of the Society took place on 22 November 1832 in Gibson’s home in Saffron Walden, where its Rules and Regulations were drawn up and its first committee appointed. Gibson was elected chairman, alongside John Player, Thomas Spurgin, Joshua Clarke and William Ward.

Early collections of natural history specimens and antiquities were initially housed in Gibson’s property, which served as a temporary base while plans for a permanent museum were developed. Gibson was among the most active proponents of creating a dedicated museum building, working closely with local figures including Lord Braybrooke and John Player to secure land and funding.

Construction of the new museum building on Castle Hill began in 1833, and the museum formally opened to subscribers in May 1835. From its outset, the Society aimed to collect widely, encompassing natural history specimens, antiquarian remains, and objects of local and general interest.

Gibson also made significant personal contributions to the museum’s early collections. Notably, he purchased and donated a large number of animal specimens acquired from South Africa, including a stuffed elephant that became one of the museum’s most prominent early exhibits.

Although the precise founders of the Society were never formally recorded, historical evidence strongly suggests that Gibson and the original committee members were responsible for its creation, with Gibson serving as its first chairman and hosting its formative meetings.
