= Ashdon Hoard =

Viking-era coins found in Essex

- Material: silver
- Size: 71 silver pennies
- Period/culture: Viking Age
- Discovered: Parish of Ashdon, Essex, 1984
- Present location: various

The Ashdon Hoard is a hoard of Viking Age coins. It was found in the parish of Ashdon in Essex and has been dated to c.895, providing the latest evidence for a bullion economy in East Anglia. The hoard consists of 71 silver pennies. These include: 29 pennies of Alfred the Great, five pennies of Guthrum, one penny of Guthred, three pennies of Charles the Bald, one penny of Odo of France and 32 pennies of uncertain mint. The hoard is one of the earliest archaeological examples of pecking, and evidence that Carolingian coins were pecked in England. At least one of the Carolingian coins in the hoard is an Anglo-Scandinavian imitation. The hoard contains the only example of a coin minted for Guthred.

== Discovery and acquisition ==
The hoard was found by metal detectorist Bob Spall, in the parish of Ashdon near the hamlet Steventon End. He returned to the site between March and October 1984 on 16 separate occasions after detecting a few coin fragments in the mud in a woodland known as Home Wood. Twelve coins were recovered intact, and the rest were reconstructed from 102 metal fragments. The coins are now part of the Fitzwilliam Museum collection, save for four coins in the British Museum and two in the Saffron Walden Museum.
