= Wendens Ambo =

Village in Essex, England

Coordinates: 52.005°N 0.204°E

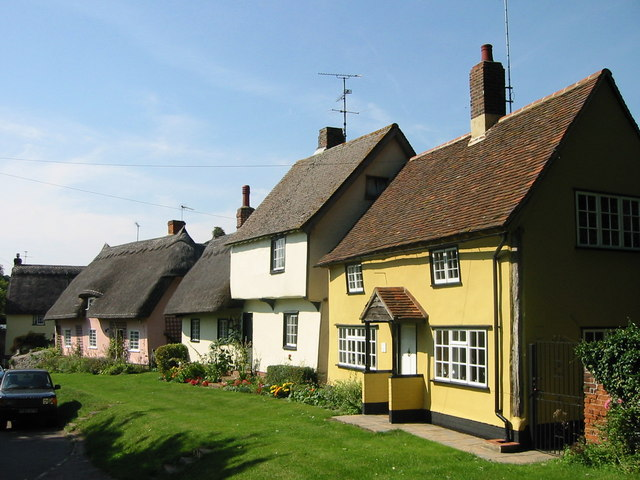
- Cottages in Wendens Ambo

- Location within Essex
- Population: 452 (Parish, 2021)
- OS grid reference: TL513363
- District: Uttlesford
- Shire county: Essex
- Region: East
- Country: England
- Sovereign state: United Kingdom
- Post town: SAFFRON WALDEN
- Postcode district: CB11
- Dialling code: 01799
- Police: Essex
- Fire: Essex
- Ambulance: East of England
- UK Parliament: North West Essex

Wendens Ambo is a village and civil parish in the Uttlesford district of Essex, England. It was historically two adjoining villages and parishes called Great Wenden and Little Wenden. The parishes were merged in 1662 to become Wendens Ambo, with ambo being the Latin for "both". At the 2021 census the parish had a population of 452.

The village lies 2 miles (3 km) south-west of centre of Saffron Walden, its post town, and 15 miles (24 km) south of Cambridge. Within the village is Audley End railway station which is the main station for Audley End House and Saffron Walden.

== History ==
Some archaeological evidence of prehistoric and Bronze Age human activity in the area has been found. A Roman villa was found to the south-west of the village in 1853.

The name Wenden is Old English and means winding or bending valley.

In the Domesday Book of 1086 there were four estates listed at "Wendena" in the Uttlesford hundred of Essex. The Domesday Book itself does not distinguish between the Wendens, but historians have deduced that the Wenden entries cover both Wendens Ambo and Wenden Lofts, which lies 3 miles (5 km) up the same valley to the north-west. The estate owned by Robert Gernon (or Greno), a Norman who also had land in Stansted and Takeley, became the parish of Great Wenden, also known as Wenden Magna. The estate owned by William de Warenne, another Norman, became the parish of Little Wenden, or Wenden Parva. The estate of Ralph Baynard appears to be Wenden Lofts, which is also the "Loutes Wenden" mentioned in a legal record of 1470, where the nearby villages of "Arkysden" and "Elmedon" are also mentioned.

A number of houses in the village date from the 17th century and early 18th century, which appears to have been a time of prosperity for the village.

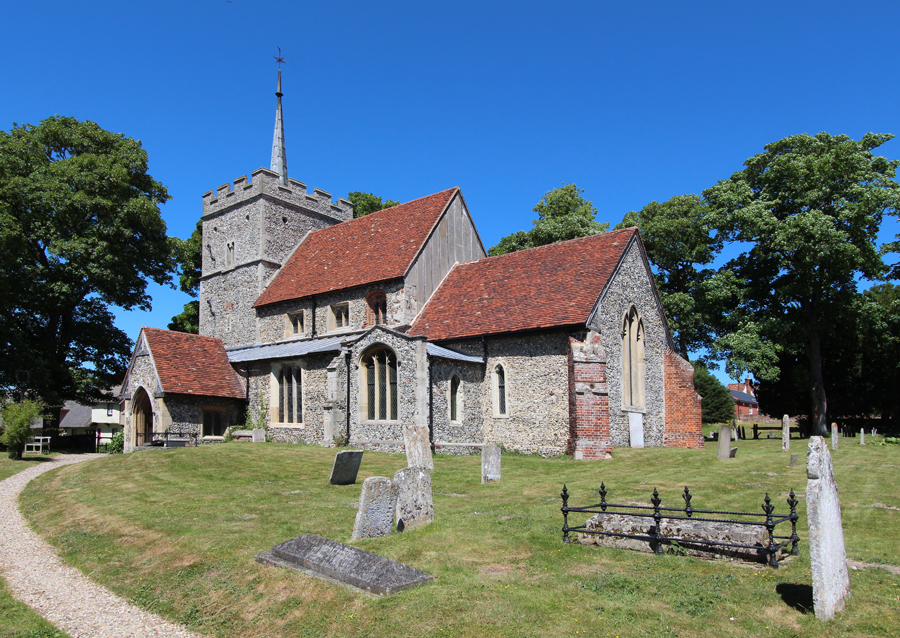
St Mary's Church

In 1662 the formerly separate parishes of Great Wenden and Little Wenden were merged to create a new parish called Wendens Ambo. The parish church of Little Wenden stood to the west of the village on the north side of Royston Road. It was already ruinous by the time of the merger and was subsequently demolished. Great Wenden's parish church, which is dedicated to St Mary and dates back to the late 11th century, became the parish church for the merged parish.

Audley End railway station opened in 1845 on the Eastern Counties Railway from London to Cambridge. The station is at Wendens Ambo and was originally called "Wendens", but the name was later changed to Audley End.

== See also ==
- The Hundred Parishes
- Waldstock Festival UK
