= Castle Camps (village) =

Village and civil parish in England

Coordinates: 52.06335°N 0.37981°E

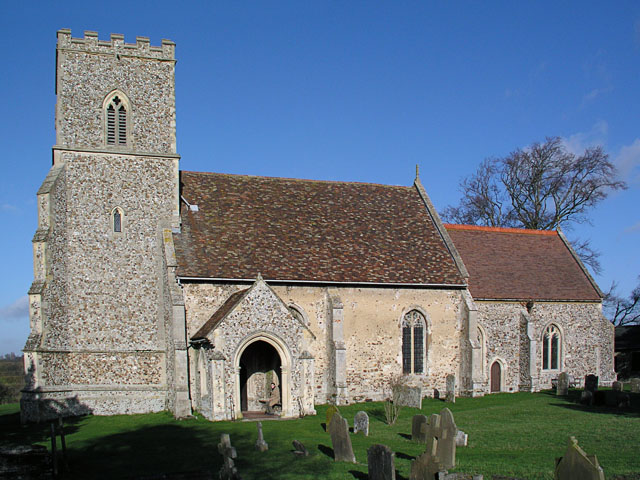
- All Saints

- Location within Cambridgeshire
- Population: 684 (2011)
- OS grid reference: TL632432
- District: South Cambridgeshire
- Shire county: Cambridgeshire
- Region: East
- Country: England
- Sovereign state: United Kingdom
- Post town: CAMBRIDGE
- Postcode district: CB21
- Dialling code: 01799
- Police: Cambridgeshire
- Fire: Cambridgeshire
- Ambulance: East of England
- UK Parliament: Cambridgeshire South East

Castle Camps is a village and civil parish in the South Cambridgeshire district, in the county of Cambridgeshire, England. It is 15 miles (24 km) south-east of Cambridge and near to the borders of Suffolk and Essex and to the town of Haverhill. The population of the parish (including Camps End) was 684 at the 2011 Census.

Previously named Great Camps and Camps Green, the village is named after Castle Camps, the castle within the parish's boundaries.

== History ==
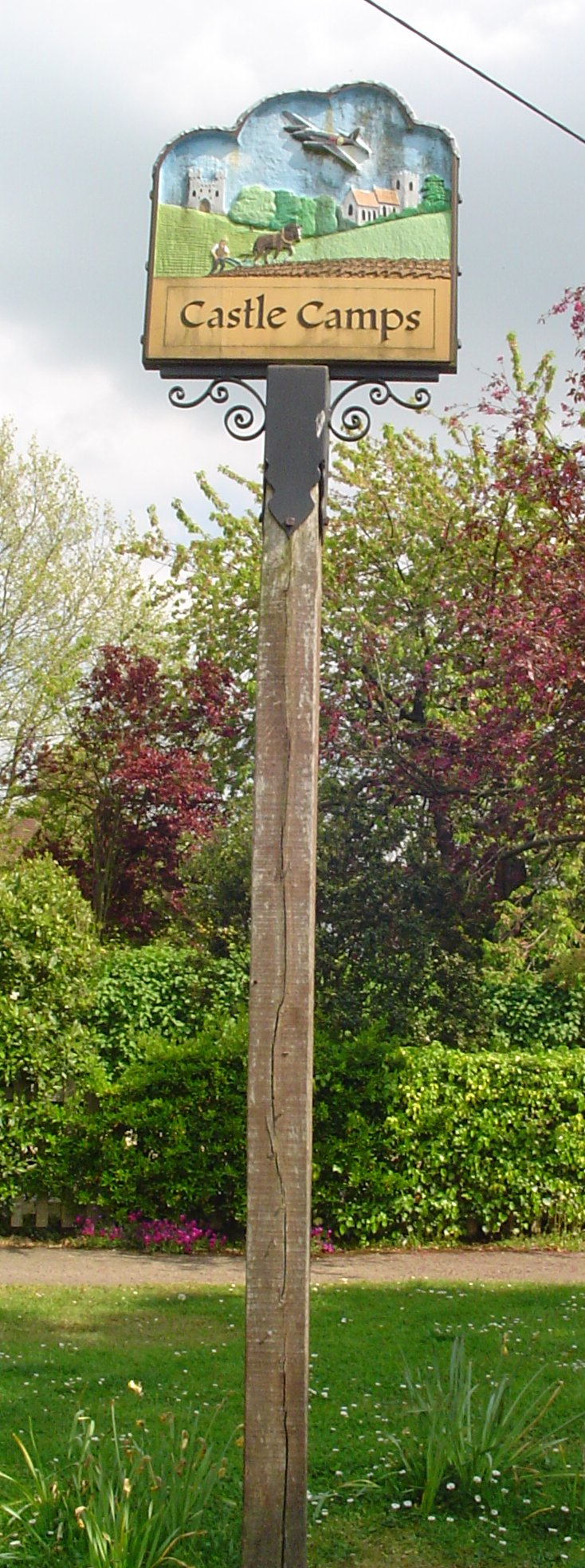
Signpost in Castle Camps

The parish of Castle Camps lies in the very south-eastern corner of Cambridgeshire. Roughly triangular in shape, it covers an area of 3,198 acres (1,294 ha). Its south-western and south-eastern borders separate it from Essex with the former following the line of the ancient woodland that separated the counties, and the latter probably representing the extent of the fence around the Castle. It also borders Shudy Camps to the north and has a short border with Bartlow to the north-west.

The hamlet of Olmstead in the south-eastern corner of the parish was sometimes listed as being part of Helions Bumpstead in Essex, and was part of its ecclesiastical parish, though part of Castle Camps for feudal purposes. It was included as part of Essex in the Risbridge poor-law union in the 19th century, and also sometimes listed as the Cambridgeshire part of Helions Bumpstead parish. The situation was only resolved in 1885 when it was transferred to Castle Camps for all civil purposes.

During the Second World War, Castle Camps, like may other parts of East Anglia, was home to an RAF station on the plateau to the south-east of the castle. Established in September 1939, RAF Castle Camps operated as a satellite for RAF Debden and RAF North Weald and numerous squadrons flew from the airfield until its closure in January 1946. The land was sold between 1963 and 1966.

== Church ==
There has been a church in Castle Camps since at least the start of the 12th century. The present parish church, dedicated to All Saints since the 15th century, comprises a chancel, nave with south porch, and west tower. Situated to the north-west of the castle, the building largely dates from the 15th and 16th century, though elements of the chancel walls may have been built in the 14th century.

The medieval tower collapsed in 1850, with a replacement completed in 1851. Extensive refurbishment continued through the 19th century. John Ernest Bode was rector of the parish in the mid-19th century, and is known for writing the hymn "O Jesus I have Promised". He is buried in the church yard. The church contains a substantial memorial to SirJames Reynolds.

== County High Point ==
The highest point of the current administrative county of Cambridgeshire, 479 feet (146 m) above sea level, is in the village of Great Chishill about 13 miles (21 km) to the west of Castle Camps. However, as Great Chishill was historically a part of Essex (having been moved in boundary changes in 1895), the historic county top of Cambridgeshire is close to Castle Camps, where a point on the disused RAF airfield reaches a height of 128 metres (420 ft) above sea level (grid reference TL 63282 41881).

== Amenities ==
The village has one public house, The Oak (formerly The Cock but renamed in April 2019), situated on the High Street. There were two alehouses licensed in Castle Camps in 1682, and in 1800 there were 2 pubs – The George, which closed around 1910, and The Oak. The New Inn opened prior to 1871 and closed in the late 20th century.

Castle Camps also has its own primary school. The schoolroom was first built in 1866, when there were 96 pupils, and the building was extended in 1876 and again in 1886. Numbers rose to a peak of 160 in the 1880s, falling to 107 in 1914 and 75 by the 1930s. Pupils of secondary age were transferred to the newly built Linton Village College in 1937.

A building was bought to become the village hall in 1952.

== See also ==
- The Hundred Parishes
