= Bartlow railway station =

Disused railway station in Bartlow, Cambridgeshire

Bartlow
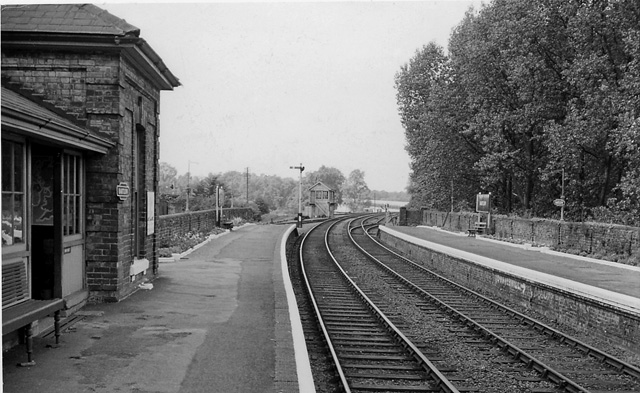
- Bartlow railway station in 1961

General information
- Location: Bartlow, South Cambridgeshire; England
- Coordinates: 52.0805°N 0.31°E
- Platforms: 3

Other information
- Status: Disused

History
- Original company: Great Eastern Railway
- Pre-grouping: Great Eastern Railway
- Post-grouping: London and North Eastern Railway

Key dates
- 1 June 1865: Opened
- 6 March 1967: Closed
Location

Bartlow railway station was a station in Bartlow, Cambridgeshire on the Stour Valley Railway at the junction with the Saffron Walden Railway. There were two platforms on the Stour Valley line and a separate linked platform for the line to Saffron Walden. The station was 48 miles 79 chains (78.84 km) from London Liverpool Street via Saffron Walden.

== History ==
The station was originally constructed by the Great Eastern Railway in 1865. The Saffron Walden line closed in 1964 and the station was closed with the Stour Valley Line in 1967 in the wake of the Beeching Axe as a large number of Britain's railway stations were shut. The station buildings have since been converted to a house.

Preceding station	Disused railways	Following station
Linton; Line and station closed	Great Eastern Railway; Stour Valley Railway	Haverhill; Line and station closed
Terminus	Great Eastern Railway; Saffron Walden Railway	Ashdon Halt; Line and station closed
