= Bragg's Mill, Ashdon =

Historic site in England

Ashdon Windmill
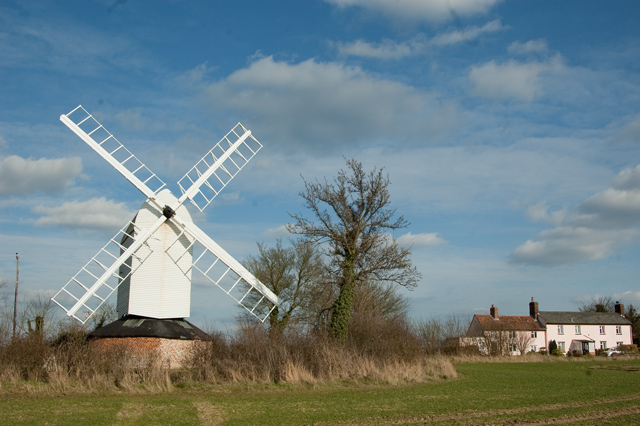
- Bragg's Mill in 2009
- Interactive map of Ashdon Windmill

Origin
- Mill name: Bragg's Mill, William Bragg's Mill; Bartlow Hamlet Mill; Stevington End Mill
- Grid reference: TL 595 425
- Coordinates: 52.0584°N 0.3258°E
- Operator: Ashdon Windmill Trust
- Year built: 1757

Information
- Purpose: Corn mill
- Type: Post mill
- Roundhouse storeys: Single storey roundhouse
- No. of sails: Four Sails
- Type of sails: Patent sails
- Windshaft: Wooden windshaft, cast iron poll end
- Winding: Tailpole

Bragg's Mill, William Bragg's Mill, Bartlow Hamlet Mill or Stevington End Mill is a grade II listed post mill at Ashdon, Essex, England which has been restored.

== History ==
Bragg's Mill was built in 1757 by William Haylock, a carpenter of Ashdon. In 1813, the mill was advertised for sale, then having two pairs of millstones. At this time it was still an open trestle mill. The mill was extended at the tail c1815. A roundhouse was added circa 1820. The mill was working until c1912. By 1932 the mill was being propped up from beneath, as the side girt on the left side had failed. The mill was renovated in the late 1950s, but was derelict again by 1974, when further repairs were carried out. The sails were removed in the 1990s.

== Restoration ==
A meeting of the villagers in April 1999 agreed that the windmill should be restored and that included the sails being fitted. The Ashdon Windmill Trust Ltd was formed and registered as a charity. Planning permission and listed building permission were obtained. In 2000, the mill was gifted to Ashdon village by the Thurlow Estate, who owned it, with the promise of a £25,000 donation once the Trust had raised £25,000 itself. The Essex Environment Trust gave a grant of £40,000 in 2001. Restoration of the mill started in March 2002. Vincent Pargeter was engaged to do the restoration. The frame of the mill was straightened, and the mill completely reclad in new weatherboards. By 2004 the mill was resplendent in a new coat of white paint. In July 2004, a grant of £46,900 was received from the Heritage Lottery Fund. New sails were fitted on 5 July 2006.

== Description ==
Bragg's Mill is a post mill with a single storey roundhouse. It has four patent sails carried on a wooden windshaft with a cast iron poll end. Two sails are double shuttered and two are single shuttered. Two pairs of millstones are driven, arranged Head and Tail. The mill is winded by tailpole. The mill is 34 ft (10.36 m) high to the roof.

=== Trestle and roundhouse ===
Before the recent restoration, the lower crosstree had been clamped at a quarterbar joint. The crosstrees stand within 3 ft 4 in (1.02 m) of ground level. The brick piers that the crosstrees rest on had been tarred, and the crosstrees themselves painted white, evidence that the mill was built as an open trestle mill. Both crosstrees are of oak, the upper being 24 ft (7.32 m) long and 13 by 12 in (330 by 305 mm) in section, whilst the lower crosstree is 12 by 11 1/2 in (305 by 292 mm) at the ends, thickening to 13 1/2 in (343 mm) at the centre. The post is 17 ft 6 in (5.33 m) long, and 27 in (686 mm) square at its base.

=== Body ===
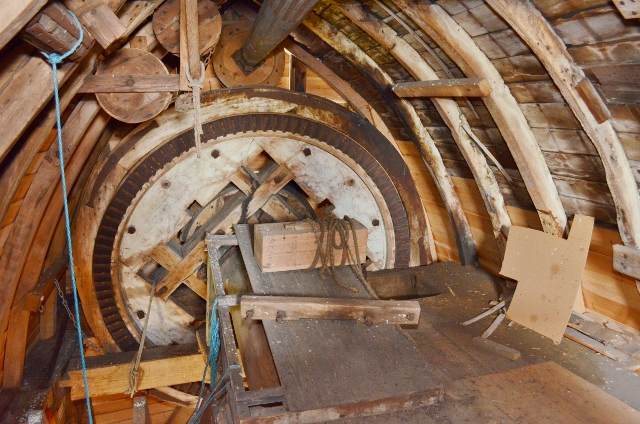
The mill in 2012

The body of the mill measures 19 ft 10 in by 11 ft (6.05 by 3.35 m) in plan. At some point, the body of the mill had been extended at the back to provide room for a bolter. It was originally only 16 ft 6 in (5.03 m) long. The crown tree is 20 in (508 mm) square at the ends, thickening to 20 by 23 in (508 by 584 mm) at the centre. The side girts are 6 by 17 in (152 by 432 mm) by in section.

=== Sails and windshaft ===
The windshaft is of wood with a cast iron poll end, probably fitted at the same time that the Patent sails were added. The mill would originally have been built with common sails.

=== Machinery ===
The clasp arm wooden head wheel was converted from Compass arm construction, it is 7 ft 4 in (2.24 m) diameter. The wooden tail wheel has also been similarly converted, it is 6 ft 4 in (1.93 m) diameter. The mill was originally built with a single pair of millstones, the second pair probably being added when the mill was extended at the rear.

== Millers ==
Millers based at Bragg's Mill include:

- Josiah Giblin 1809 - 1819
- John Ruse 1830
- John Brown 1848
- Frederick and John Ruse 1850
- John Bragg 1898
- William Bragg 1894 - 1912

== Culture ==
Bragg's Mill in its last working years was described in the book Five Miles from Bunkum.

== Public access ==
The mill is open to the public on the second Sunday of each month, starting in April each year.
