= Hadstock =

Village in Essex, England

Coordinates: 52.080°N 0.272°E

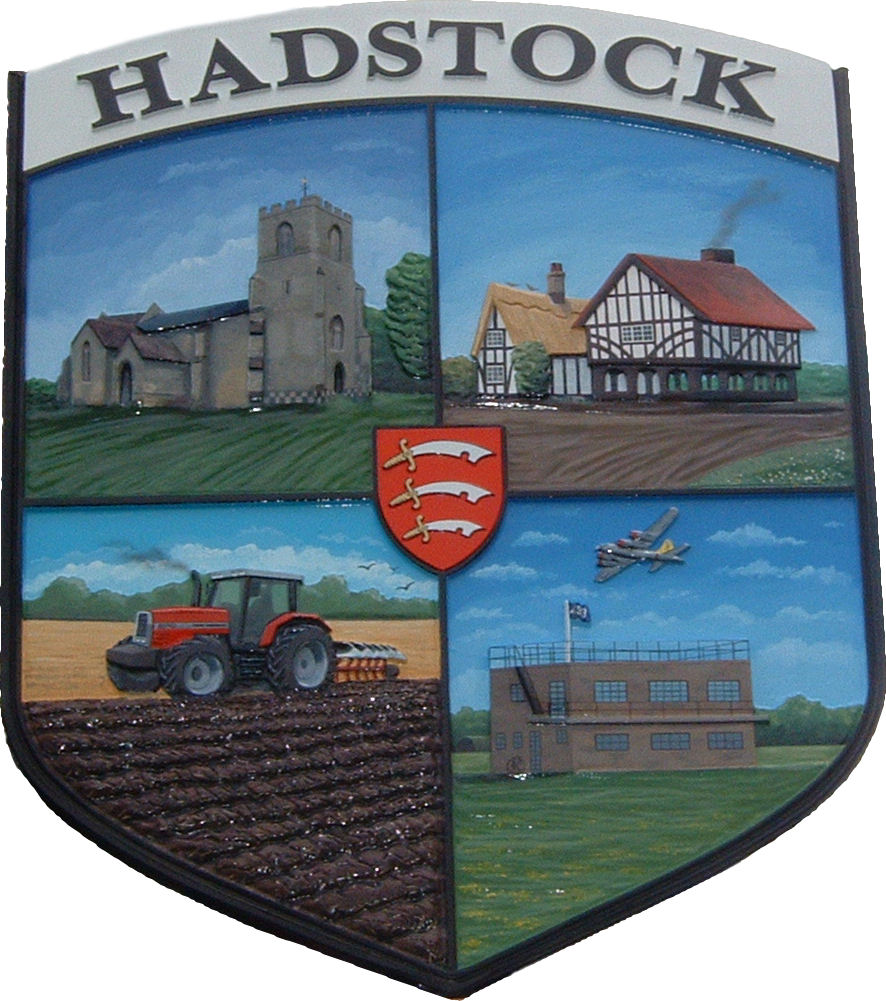
- Hadstock village sign

- Location within Essex
- Population: 318 (Parish, 2021)
- OS grid reference: TL558448
- Civil parish: Hadstock
- District: Uttlesford
- Shire county: Essex
- Region: East
- Country: England
- Sovereign state: United Kingdom
- Post town: Cambridge
- Postcode district: CB21
- Dialling code: 01223
- Police: Essex
- Fire: Essex
- Ambulance: East of England
- UK Parliament: North West Essex

Hadstock is a village and civil parish in the Uttlesford district of Essex, England, lying close to the county boundary with Cambridgeshire. It is 6 miles (10 km) north of Saffron Walden and 9 miles (14 km) south-east of Cambridge, its post town. At the 2021 census the parish had a population of 318.

The Church of England parish church of Saint Botolph has the oldest door still in use in Great Britain. The oldest parts of the church are thought to date from about AD 1020. Since that time, the church has received many additions and undergone several renovations.

On the outskirts of the village is a disused airfield that was used in World War II. While the official name for the airfield became RAF Little Walden, it was originally named after the village of Hadstock.

From 1951 until at least 1968 Hadstock boasted the only mounted Scout troop in Britain. It was led by Dr. Jock Dawson.

Hadstock has a silver band.

== See also ==
- The Hundred Parishes
