= Bartlow Hills =

Roman tumuli cemetery in Cambridgeshire, England

Coordinates: 52.0796°N 0.3137°E

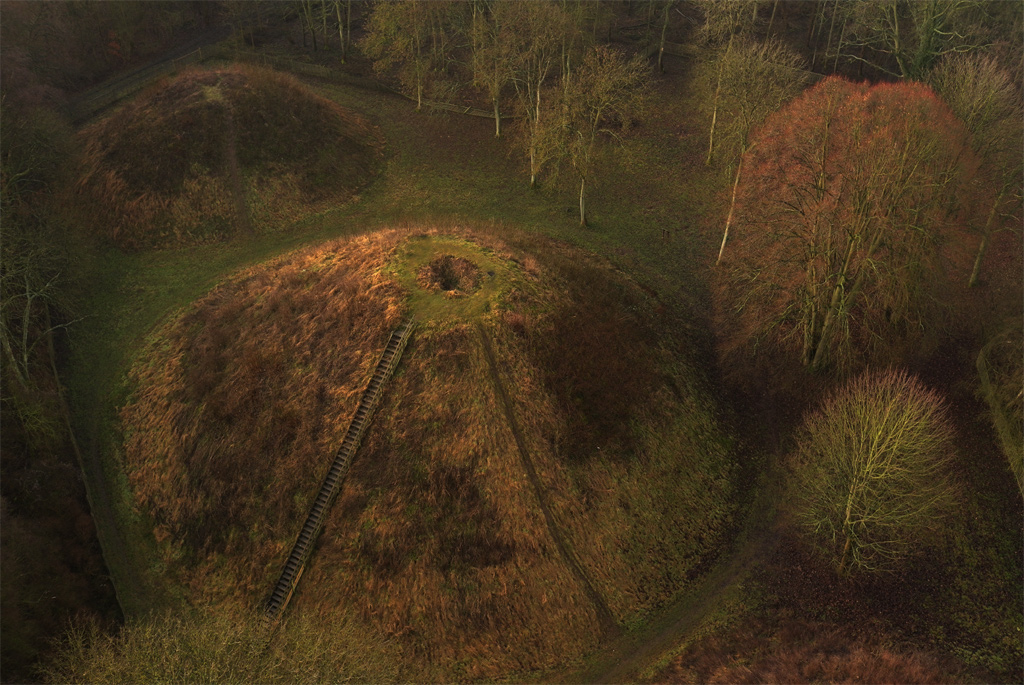
Bartlow Hills

Bartlow Hills is a Roman tumuli cemetery in Bartlow, Cambridgeshire, England. Four of the original seven tumuli or barrows remain; the largest three are accessible to the public, the northernmost and smallest is on private property and is not easily visible. The remnants of two more are visible as low mounds west of the three largest barrows. The tallest barrow is 15 metres (50 ft) high, and is the largest Roman barrow north of the Alps. The barrows date from the 1st or 2nd centuries AD.

Excavations were undertaken in the 19th century (chiefly in 1832–40), discovering walled graves containing human cremains within glass vessels, which were stored in large wooden chests. Decorated vessels in bronze, enamel, pottery and an iron folding chair were also found among other funerary goods (most of which were lost in a fire at Easton Lodge in 1847). A small Roman villa, occupied until the late 4th century, was situated north of the mounds and was excavated in 1852. The site saw no further work until a geophysical survey in 2006 and further excavations in 2007, but this work did not establish the location of the villa.

== Bibliography ==
- Eckardt, H., Brewer, P., Hay, S. and Poppy, S. (2009) Roman barrows and their landscape context: a GIS case study at Bartlow, Cambridgeshire. Britannia, 40 (1). pp. 65–98. ISSN 1753-5352
- Eckardt, H., Clarke, A. S., Hay, S., Macaulay, S., Ryan, P., Thornley, D. M. and Timby, J. (2009) The Bartlow Hills in context: report on recent excavations. Proceedings of the Cambridge Antiquarian Society, XCVIII. pp. 47–64.
- Astin, T., Eckardt, H. and Hay, S. (2007) Resistivity imaging survey of the Roman barrows at Bartlow, Cambridgeshire, UK. Archaeological Prospection, 14 (1). pp. 24–37. ISSN 1075-2196
- The 19th century excavations were published in the journal Archaeologia in the years 1834, 1836, 1840, and 1842.
