= Saffron Walden Railway =

English former railway

The Saffron Walden Railway was a branch of the Great Eastern Railway between Audley End and Bartlow on the Stour Valley Railway between Shelford to Haverhill, a distance of 7 1/4 miles (11.7 km).

== Branch information ==
=== Opening ===
The line was opened between Audley End and Saffron Walden on 21 November 1865 and to Bartlow in 1866.

=== Operation and services ===
The line was the initiative of the local Gibson family whose bank helped to finance the railway. It remained independent until 1 January 1877 when the Great Eastern Railway purchased the line. The Engineer's Line Reference for the line is AEB.

Initially, there were six return trains a day and, between 1877 and 1894, trains operated between Saffron Walden and London. Coaches dating from the 1890s operated on the line until the 1950s. From July 1958, the line was operated by railbuses until closure.

=== Closure ===
The line closed to passengers on 7 September 1964 and to freight three months later. At Audley End, services used a separate platform, the building of which still remains, in the current car park (52.0043°N 0.2077°E).
