= Pierre Young =

Pierre Young FRS FRAeS FREng FIMechE

Deputy Engineering Director, Rolls-Royce
- In office 1978–1984

Personal details
- Born: Pierre Henry John Young; 12 June 1926 France
- Died: 4 August 1985 (aged 59)

Pierre Henry John Young (12 June 1926 – 4 August 1985) was a British mathematician, of French heritage, who was in charge, during the 1960s, of the engine development for Concorde.

== Early life ==
He was born in France, speaking French. He attended Lycée Condorcet, and school in England from 1938, being evacuated to Herefordshire.

At Trinity College, Cambridge he studied Maths. Whilst at Cambridge, his knowledge of the French language was given to the BBC foreign language service, for coded messages to the French Resistance.

== Career ==
He joined Bristol Siddeley in 1949, and in 1959 he became assistant chief engineer.

=== Concorde engine ===
He was the head of Concorde engine programme from 1962. This was taken over by Rolls-Royce from 1966. His knowledge of the French language helped the two teams socialise, and work. He understood the 'volatile French temperament'.

On Wednesday 3 April 1969, he appeared on 'The Change Makers' on BBC1 at 10.50pm.

On 2 March 1969, he attended the first flight of Concorde, in France., with his deputy, Peter Calder.

By the early 1970s, he was Technical Director of the Bristol Engine Division of Rolls-Royce. He gave a talk about Concorde on Wednesday 3 May 1972 at the Bristol branch of the Royal Aeronautical Society. In February 1975 he became deputy technical director of Rolls-Royce.

He was featured on the 'Faster than the Sun' documentary on BBC1 on Wednesday 13 April 1983, following Speedbird 193 from London, with Captain Brian Walpole and Christopher Orlebar, passing by Nova Scotia and Nantucket.

He received the RAeS Gold medal in 1984.

== Personal life ==
He married Lily Irene Cahn (German nationality, from Fürth in northern Bavaria, 14 July 1928- 4 January 1990) in 1953; her elder brother was Robert W. Cahn FRS, and her nephew is Sir Andrew Cahn.

His son, Thomas, and daughter, Michele, both attended the University of Cambridge.

He went on holidays, climbing in the Alps. Twice a week he would put on his shorts, and jog around The Downs, Bristol. He lived on Rockleaze Avenue in Sneyd Park, near Stoke Bishop. His memorial service was on 20 February 1986 at St Peter's church in Filton, attended by his wife Irène.
