= Beardshaw =

Beardshaw is an English surname. Notable people with this name include:

- Chris Beardshaw (born 1969), British garden designer, plantsman, author, speaker and broadcaster
- Colin Beardshaw (1912–1977), English footballer
- Joe Beardshaw (born 1976), rugby union player
- Virginia Beardshaw (born 1952), chair of the Annual Fund at the London School of Economics and Political Science
