= The Mount School, York =

School for girls in North Yorkshire, England

The Mount School
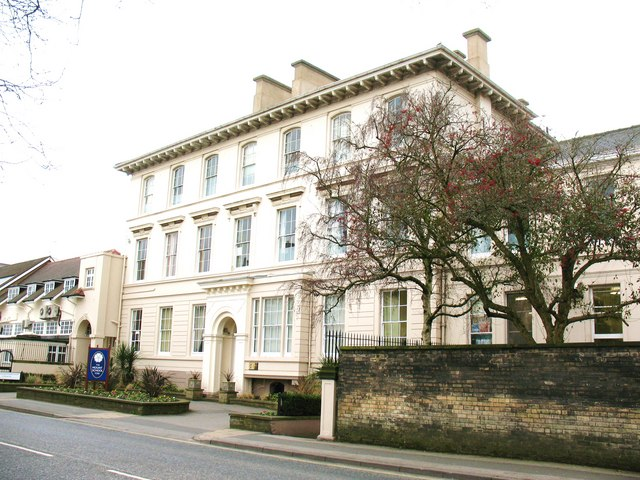
- The Mount School York

Location
- Dalton Terrace; York, North Yorkshire, YO24 4DD; England; 53.95235°N 1.09771°W

Information
- Former names: Trinity Lane (York) Quaker Girls' School
- Type: Private day and boarding school
- Motto: Latin: Fidelis in Parvo (Faithfulness in small things)
- Religious affiliations: Religious Society of Friends (Quaker)
- Established: 1785; 241 years ago
- Founders: Quakers
- Department for Education URN: 121726 Tables
- Head: Anna Wilby
- Gender: Girls
- Age: 3 to 18
- Enrolment: ~290
- Houses: Cadbury; Frys; Terry's; Rowntrees
- Affiliations: Girls' Schools Association; Independent Schools Council
- Website: mountschoolyork.co.uk

Listed Building – Grade II
- Official name: The Mount School nineteenth century block
- Designated: 24 June 1983
- Reference no.: 1257912

The Mount School is a private Quaker day and boarding school for girls ages 3–18, and a co-ed Junior School, located in York, England. The school was founded in 1785, and the current Head is Anna Wilby. The Mount School is one of seven Quaker schools in England. In 2020, it was the first girls' school in the North of England to become an All-Steinway School. The school is also a member of the Girls' Schools Association and the Independent Schools Council.

== History ==
The school, under the name Trinity Lane (or York) Quaker Girls' School, was founded in 1785 by Yorkshire Quaker, Esther Tuke, wife of William Tuke.

In 1831, Esther and William's grandson Samuel Tuke, along with William Alexander, Thomas Backhouse and Joseph Rowntree, moved the school to Castlegate House with Hannah Brady registered as the superintendent (1831–42). She was followed by Elizabeth Brady (1842–47), Eliza Stringer (1847–1853), and Rachel Tregelles (1853–1862), who oversaw the move of the school to its current premises, The Mount, in 1856.

In 1866, Lydia Rous returned from her work with the Underground Railroad during the American Civil War to become the new superintendent, eventually retiring in 1879.

From 1890 to 1902, Lucy Harrison was identified as the headmistress of The Mount; Harrison endeavoured to bring many of the conventions of the school in line with contemporary norms at the time, particularly those surrounding health and wellbeing.

From 1946 to 1966, Margery Willoughby was the head teacher. On 24 June 1983, the 19th-century block of the school was designated a Grade II listed building.

== Traditions ==
The Mount School has many long-standing traditions, including a game event called Games in the Dark which takes place on Bonfire Night. Year 11 students arrange a treasure hunt challenge for the younger students to take part in and it often involves many pranks. College-aged pupils traditionally present two events to the school, one at the end of each term, respectively, the College I Pantomime and the Leavers' Play, at which previous head girls are presented with gifts by their successors.

== Curriculum ==
In 2012, the school introduced the PeaceJam Ambassadors programme into the school curriculum. The school has "pillars of excellence" in the subject areas of sciences, maths, history, music, sports, art, drama and foreign languages.

=== Sports ===
The Mount has yearly activities in orienteering and fencing, netball, hockey and swimming in the winter, rounders, tennis and athletics in the summer. College girls are able to choose the sports, lacrosse and whether or not to use a fitness suite.

=== Creative arts ===
The Mount is an All Steinway School Extracurricular creative art groups include both Senior and Junior Orchestra, Senior and Junior Choir, a Wind group and a Swing Band for woodwind and brass instruments. The school follows the London Academy of Music and Dramatic Art (LAMDA) syllabus and there is usually a school and college play performed every year.

== Accolades ==
In The Times League Table, the school is ranked 2nd by A-level results in the York area. In the Yorkshire Post, the school was ranked in the A-level results table for Yorkshire in 2012.

== Notable alumnae ==
- Isobel Barnett (1918–1980), Scottish radio and television personality
- Virginia Beardshaw CBE (b. 1952), Founder Fellow of the King's Fund Institute
- Dame Jocelyn Bell Burnell (b. 1943), astrophysicist
- Kate Bellingham (b. 1963), BBC technology presenter and engineer
- Laura Busson (b. 1978), BBC Radio 2 Commissioning Executive
- Dame A. S. Byatt (1936–2023), author
- Ruth Cadbury (b. 1959), politician
- Margaret Crosfield (1859–1952), palaeontologist, one of the first 13 female fellows of the Geological Society of London in 1919
- Dame Judi Dench (b. 1934), actress
- Dame Margaret Drabble (b. 1939), author
- Audrey Evans (1925–2022), paediatric oncologist, co-founder of the Ronald McDonald House Charities
- Professor Ruth Finnegan (b. 1933), social anthropologist
- Mary Sturge Gretton (1871–1961), historian and magistrate
- Jean Henderson (1899–1997), lawyer and Liberal Party politician
- Rachel Howard (b. 1969), artist
- Noni Jabavu (1919–2008), South African writer and journalist
- Dame Elaine Kellett-Bowman (1923–2014), former Conservative MP
- Rose Neill, BBC Broadcaster
- Nuzo Onoh (b. 1962), British-Nigerian writer
- Helen Osborne (1939–2004), journalist and critic
- Tessa Rowntree (1909–1999), aid worker in Czechoslovakia
- Winifred Sargent (1905–1979), mathematician
- Anna Southall (b. 1948), director of the National Museums and Galleries of Wales
- Nicola Spence (b. 1961), biologist
- Cheryl Taylor (b. 1964), controller of CBBC
- Kathleen Mary Tillotson (1906–2001), literary scholar
- Mary Ure (1933–1975), actress
- Elfrida Vipont (1902–1992), children's author
- Hilary Wainwright (b. 1949), feminist and Guardian writer
- Anna Walker (b. 1962), BBC Tomorrow's World and Sky presenter
- Frances Wilson (b. 1964), English author, academic and critic

== See also ==
- List of Friends Schools
- Listed buildings in York (outside the city walls, southern part)
