= Walden Castle =

Ruined castle in Essex, England

- Essex, England
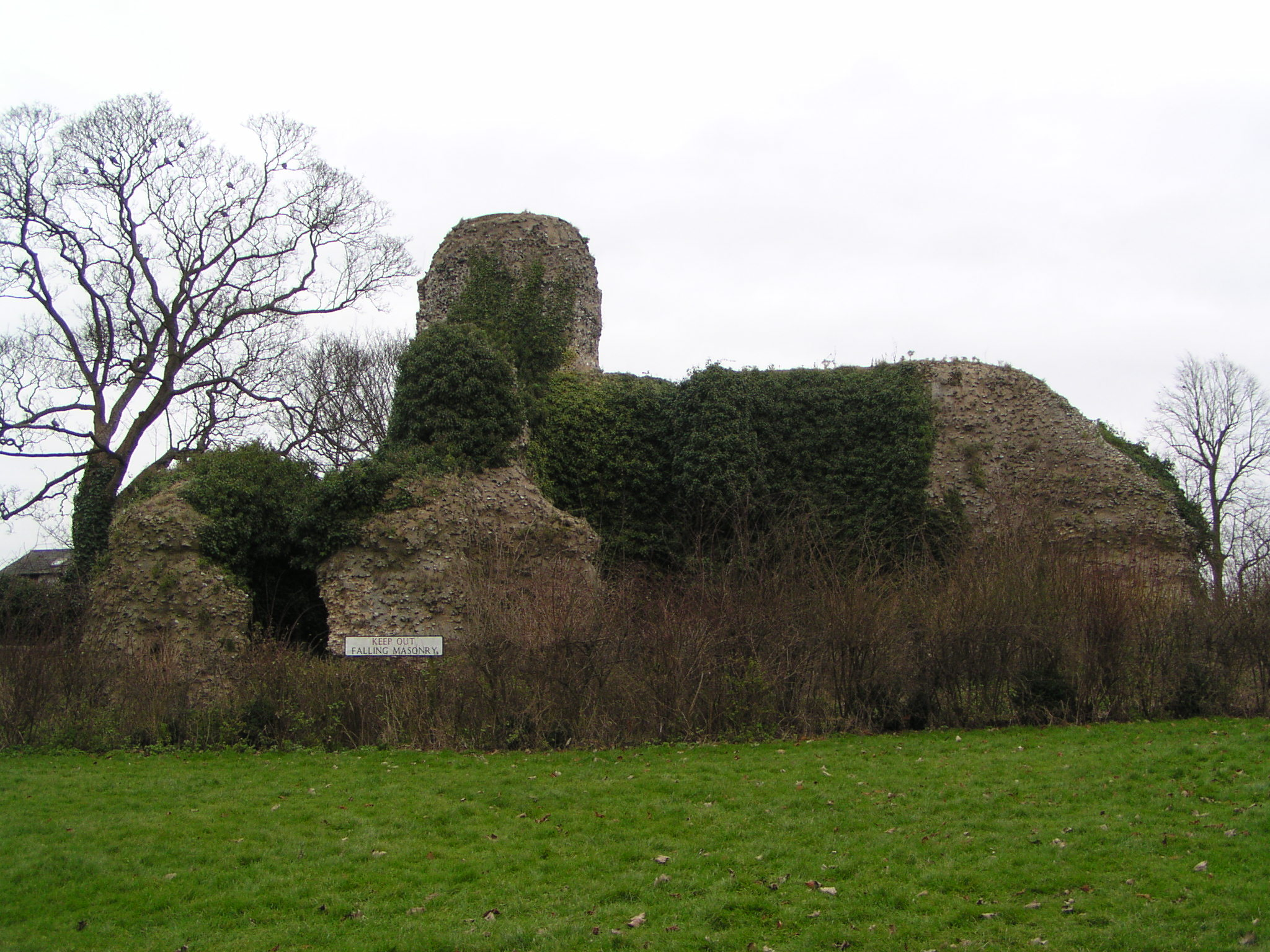
- The ruins of Walden castle

Site information
- Type: Keep and bailey
- Condition: Ruined

Location
- Shown within Essex
- Coordinates: 52.0255°N 0.2420°E

Walden Castle was a medieval castle in Essex, England, built during the Anarchy of the 12th century. Only the ruined core of the structure remains today.

== History ==
Walden Castle was built in the town of Saffron Walden in Essex at the start of the civil war known as the Anarchy by Geoffrey de Mandeville, with much of the work occurring between 1141 and 1143. It was one of several castles built by de Mandeville to reinforce his power across the region. The castle stood on a natural high point within the town (grid reference TL539387) and had a square Norman keep and bailey wall, forming a substantial fortification. Geoffrey de Mandeville was arrested under questionable circumstances by King Stephen in 1143, and ordered to hand over his castles, including Walden; de Mandeville initially agreed, but reneged on the agreement once released and launched a military campaign against the king's strongholds in Cambridgeshire in an attempt to free the route south to Walden. Geoffrey de Mandeville died during a siege the following year (in Burwell), still not having reclaimed Walden.

It is told in the Gesta Stephani that, when de Mandeville was dispossessed, Stephen had placed the castle and its domains in the custody (but not the possession) of Turgisius de Abrinciis (de Avranches), one of his most trusted men. Turgis had witnessed Stephen's charter by which de Mandeville was created hereditary Count of Essex, and with him had witnessed the king's confirmation charter to Monk's Horton Priory in Kent. Turgis also witnessed Stephen's charter of 1139 to Salisbury, and in 1142-43 Stephen confirmed his grant, as King's Constable, of land in Oxfordshire to the Templars. Although he had received many benefits from the king, in 1145 he refused to surrender the castle to him, until one day the king with a large force surprised him while he was out hunting, and threatened to hang him in chains over the castle gate. Henry II ordered the castle, with the keep probably still unfinished, to be slighted in 1157. According to historian Sidney Painter, it was one of at least 21 castles demolished on Henry II's instructions.

Saffron Walden's streets are shaped by the outline of the castle bailey. Only the ruined core of the castle remains, with most of the stones removed and repurposed over the intervening centuries; the castle is a scheduled monument and a Grade I listed building.

== See also ==
- Castles in Great Britain and Ireland
- List of castles in England
- Saffron Walden Museum

== Bibliography ==
- Bradbury, Jim. (2009) Stephen and Matilda: the Civil War of 1139-53. Stroud, UK: The History Press. ISBN 978-0-7509-3793-1.
- Painter, Sidney. (1935) "English Castles in the Early Middle Ages: Their Number, Location, and Legal Position", Speculum 10 (3), pp. 321–322 doi:10.2307/2848384
- Pettifer, Adrian. (2002) English Castles: a Guide by Counties. Woodbridge, UK: Boydell Press. ISBN 978-0-85115-782-5.
