= Ruth Finnegan =

British author, professor, linguistic anthropologist

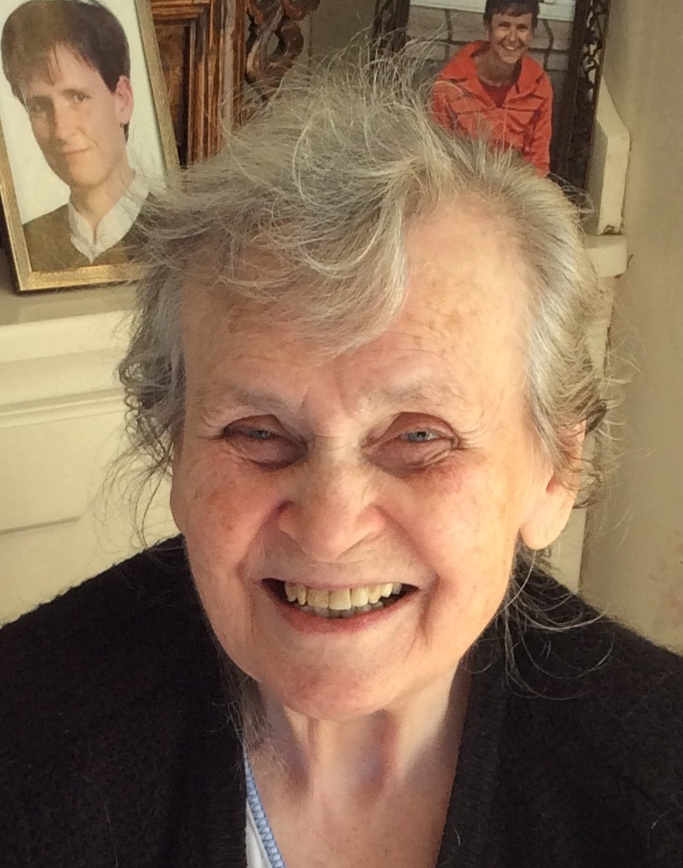
Ruth Finnegan

Ruth Hilary Finnegan OBE FBA (born 30 December 1933) is a Northern Irish linguistic anthropologist and Emeritus Professor of the Open University.

== Biography ==
Finnegan was born in 1933 in Derry. She attended Londonderry High School (now Foyle College and The Mount School, York after which she studied Literae humaniores at Somerville College, Oxford and followed this with her PhD in Anthropology. Her thesis, submitted in 1963 from Nuffield College, Oxford, was titled "The Limba of Sierra Leone with special reference to their folktales or "oral literature"".

After teaching social anthropology at the University of Zimbabwe in 1963–1964 and sociology at the University of Ibadan in 1965–1967, Finnegan joined the Open University in 1969 as one of the founding members of academic staff. She was a lecturer in sociology there until 1972, became reader in comparative social institutes in 1982 and then professor in 1988. Finnegan was a visiting professor in anthropology at the University of Texas at Austin in 1989.

Finnegan was elected as Fellow of the British Academy in 1996. She received an OBE in the 2000 New Year Honours for services to Social Sciences. She is an honorary fellow of Somerville College, Oxford. In 2016 she received the Rivers Memorial Medal from the Royal Anthropological Institute.

== Select publications ==
- Finnegan, R. 2018. "Alternative consciousness", in International Encyclopaedia of Anthropology. Wiley.
- Finnegan, R. (ed) 2017. Entrancement: The Consciousness of Dreaming, Music and the World. University of Wales Press.
- Finnegan, R. 2015. Where is Language?: An Anthropologist's Questions on Language, Literature and Performance. Bloomsbury.
- Finnegan, R. 2014. "Play is serious: children's games, verbal art and creativity in Africa", International Journal of Play.
- Finnegan, R. 2012. Oral Literature in Africa. Cambridge: Open Book Publishers. open access and downloadable for free
- Finnegan, R. (ed) 2005. Participating in the Knowledge Society: Researchers Beyond the University Walls. Palgrave Macmillan.
- Finnegan, R. 2002. Communicating: The Multiple Modes of Human Interconnection. Routledge.
- Finnegan, R. 1992. Oral Poetry: Its Nature, Significance and Social Context, 2nd edn. Bloomington IN, Indiana University Press.
- Finnegan, R. 1989. The Hidden Musicians: Music-Making in an English Town., Cambridge, Cambridge University Press.
- Finnegan, R. 1970. Oral literature in Africa. Oxford, Clarendon Press.

== Books available as Open Access ==
- Finnegan, Ruth. Oral literature in Africa. Open Book Publishers, 2012.
- Finnegan, Ruth. Oral poetry. Open Book Publishers, 2025.
