= Saffron Walden Town Hall =

Municipal building in Saffron Walden, Essex, England

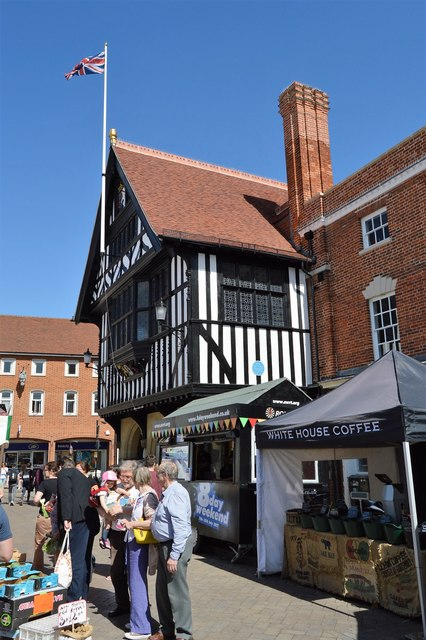
- Saffron Walden Town Hall

- Shown in Essex
- 52.0236°N 0.2414°E
- Location: Market Place, Saffron Walden

History
- Built: 1763

Site notes
- Architect: Edward Burgess
- Architectural style: Tudor style

Listed Building – Grade II
- Official name: Town Hall
- Designated: 1 November 1972
- Reference no.: 1196219

Saffron Walden Town Hall is a municipal building in the Market Place, Saffron Walden, Essex, England. The structure, which is the headquarters of Saffron Walden Town Council, is a Grade II listed building.

== History ==
The current building was commissioned to replace a medieval town hall in the Market Place: several tenement buildings were demolished at the same time so that there would be more room for holding markets. The foundation stone for the new building was laid by the mayor, William Mapletoft, in 1761. It was designed in the neoclassical style, built in red brick and was completed in 1763. The design of the original building involved a symmetrical main frontage with seven bays facing onto the Market Place; the central section of three bays, which slightly projected forward and was rusticated on the ground floor, featured three arched openings, each with a wrought-iron grill; on the first floor there was a tall round headed sash window flanked by two conventional sash windows with blind panels above and, at roof level, there was a modillioned cornice, a parapet and a central turret. Internally, the principal room was the courtroom and there was also a lock-up for petty criminals.

Local government in towns was reformed in 1836 under the Municipal Corporations Act 1835, with Saffron Walden becoming a municipal borough. The town hall continued to serve as headquarters of the reformed council. The courtroom was converted to serve as a council chamber in 1836 and new lock-up facilities were created at the back of the town hall in 1840.

In October 1877, a local businessman, George Stacey Gibson, offered to pay for the remodelling of the town hall. The work involved a large new porch designed by Edward Burgess in the Tudor style which was officially opened by the mayor, Joseph Bell, who accepted the keys from Gibson, on 1 October 1879. The design of the porch, which was timber-framed on the upper floors, involved a three-opening loggia on the ground floor and a prominent bay window on the first floor flanked by brackets supporting a pediment containing a smaller window and a coat of arms in the tympanum. Following the remodelling, the principal rooms were the council chamber and the assembly room. Pevsner liked the design which he described as "ostentatious" but worthy of "an honourable mention".

As the council's responsibilities grew it needed more office accommodation than was available in the town hall. In 1934 the council bought a large house nearby at 5 Hill Street to serve as its offices. The town hall continued to be used for council meetings.

The initial stages of the trial of Major Oliver Smedley for the alleged manslaughter of the band manager, Reginald Calvert, took place in the town hall in July 1966; Smedley was founded to have acted in self-defence and was acquitted.

The town hall continued to serve as the meeting place of the borough council until it was abolished in 1974 and replaced by Uttlesford District Council, which initially established its headquarters at the former Saffron Walden Rural District council offices in Debden Road. The town hall instead became the meeting place of the parish-level Saffron Walden Town Council, created as a successor parish covering the same area as the abolished borough.

The BBC Radio programme Any Questions? was broadcast from the town hall in May 2011. As a cost saving measure, Saffron Walden Town Council relocated its staff, who had previously been based in offices in Emson Close, into the town hall in October 2020.

Works of art in the town hall include portraits by Daniël Mijtens of King Charles I and of Queen Henrietta and a portrait by Henry Scott Tuke of the benefactor of the town hall, George Stacey Gibson.
