= Elizabeth Brady =

- Born: Elizabeth Hutchinson; 28 March 1803; Islington
- Died: 22 May 1874 (aged 71); Edgbaston
- Occupation: Teacher
- Known for: Heads of schools
- Spouse: Edward Brady

Elizabeth Brady born Elizabeth Hutchinson (28 March 1803 – 22 May 1874) was a British headmistress of Friends' School, Saffron Walden, The Mount School, York and her own school in Edgbaston.

== Early life ==
Brady was born in Islington in 1803. Her parents were both Quakers, Elizabeth and Jacob Hutchinson. In 1806 her mother Elizabeth and her two siblings had to move to Norfolk as their father was in disgrace for not settling his debts. The four of them were cared for by a Quaker meeting in Norfolk.

In about 1811 her family moved back to London where she began her education at the Friends School in Islington. She did well even though the school was damp and not suited to teaching and learning. As she completed her education she became a teacher.

== Career ==
In 1825 the school moved and began operation in Croydon. There was initially 120 places for students who began at the age of nine. Children did not have to be members of the Quakers but these children were accepted first. In 1826 Edward Foster Brady who had been born in London in 1802 and who had also been a pupil of the school when it was in Islington began work there as another teacher. Before her arrival he had been abroad getting suffering from tuberculosis. In 1828 the school had a marriage when Elizabeth married Edward Brady. In 1833 they became joint superintendents of the Friends' School, although Edward was an invalid by 1835. He died in 1838 and Elizabeth Brady lead the school until 1842 when she moved to York.

In York, she led The Mount School, a Quaker school for girls at 1 Castlegate until 1847. The school had been founded by Quakers including Joseph Rowntree and Samuel Tuke. She was replaced by Eliza Stringer when she left due to ill health and moved to Birmingham. Two years later she started her own girls school for Quakers in Edgbaston. She retired again 1869 after leading the school for 21 years. She was lifelong Quaker supporting causes including abolition, the Dorcas society and the Peace Society.

== Retirement and death ==
Her retirement was not care-free as she soon became an invalid. Brady died in 1874 in Edgbaston leaving about £4000. She had given birth to three children from 1829 to 1834 during her short marriage. These were Bedford Foster, Elizabeth and Anna Jane.
