= Elizabeth Rous Comstock =

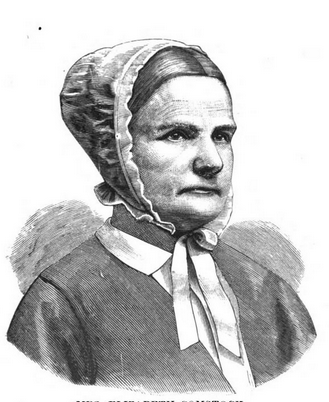
- Born: Elizabeth Leslie Rous; October 30, 1815; Maidenhead, Berkshire England
- Died: August 3, 1891 (aged 75); Union Springs, New York

Elizabeth Leslie Comstock (October 30, 1815- August 3, 1891) was a Quaker minister and social reformer, abolitionist and worker for social welfare who helped the Society of Friends adjust to the urban-industrial age. Comstock was a very active spokesperson who educated people about those stricken by illness in places such as hospitals and prison camps. In the time of the American Civil War, Comstock worked to relieve people who had recently been freed. Comstock was instrumental in the Underground Railroad, leading a very active station in Rollin, Michigan.

== Early life ==
Elizabeth Leslie Rouse was born on October 30, 1815, to William and Mary Rous in Maidenhead in Berkshire, England. Comstock was the oldest of nine children. Comstock attended Quaker schools in Islington and at Croydon.

== Early career ==
She married Leslie Wright in 1847 and they moved to Bakewell in Derbyshire where they ran a shop. Leslie died and she decided to move to Ontario with her sister and her daughter, Caroline. She became a Quaker minister whilst at Belleville.

== Activism ==
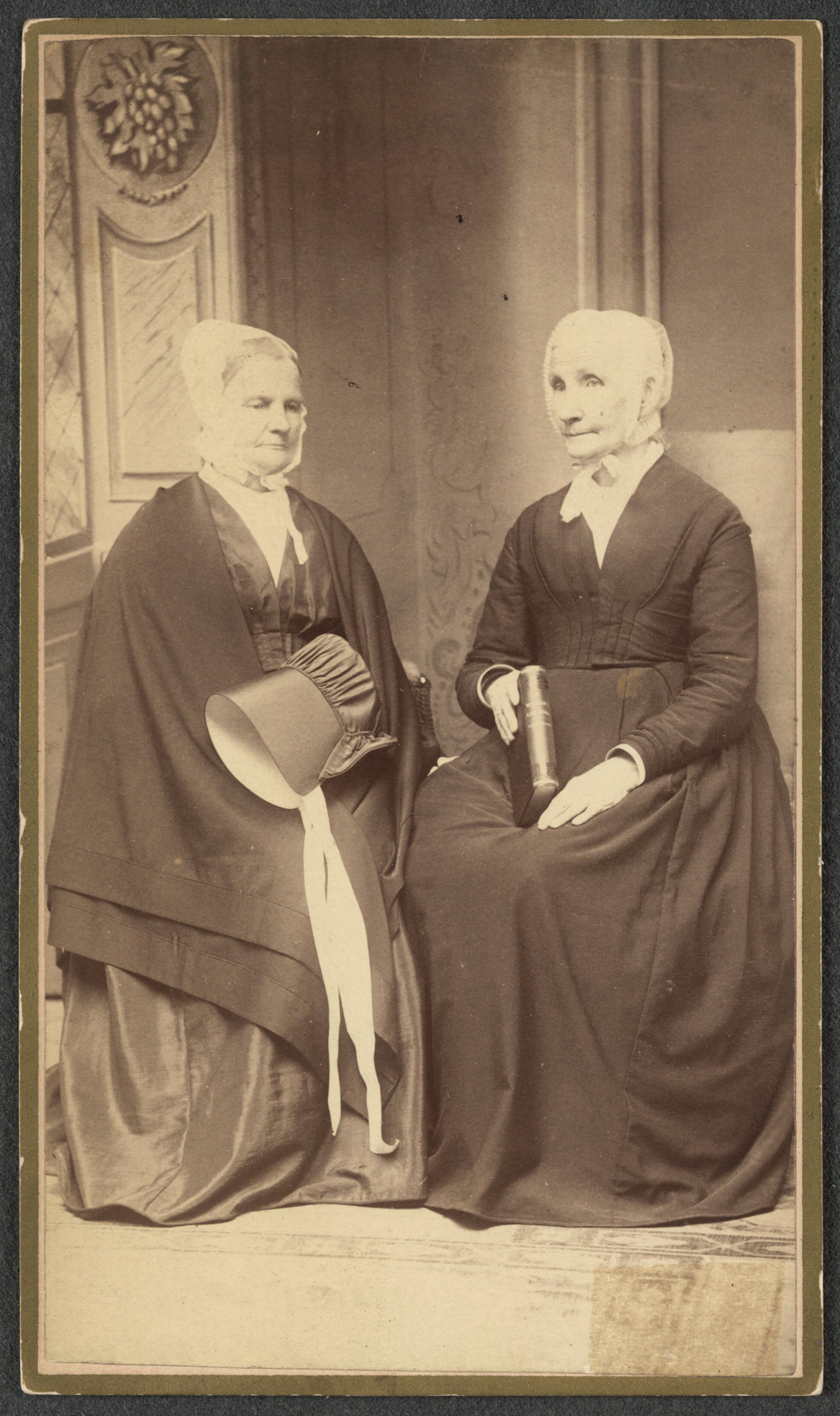
Elizabeth L. Comstock with Laura S. Heaviland

In 1854, the Comstock immigrated to Canada, and became a Quaker minister. Four years later, Comstock moved to Michigan, and became active in the abolitionist movement. Comstock became the leader of Quaker communities of southeastern Michigan. Comstock ran the Rollin station of the Underground Railroad. During the Civil War, Comstock ministered in hospitals and prison camps. In advocating for prison reform Comstock gave preaching tours of prisons, and spoke on behalf of humane treatment of inmates and pleaded the cause of prisoners of whose innocence Comstock believed in. In 1864 she went to speak to President Lincoln about improving the prisons. After the civil war and the slaves were freed she assisted with their transition to citizenship running the Kansas Freedmen's Relief Association.

Her sister, Lydia Rous, who had been working for John Bright came to the US for a second time in 1866. She met Elizxabeth and assisting in hospitals that were treating the wounded from the American Civil War.

After the war, Comstock continued to advocated for prison reform, temperance, peace, women's rights, home-mission welfare work and how to adapt to urbanization. In 1879, Comstock toured the country raising funds, for the "Exodusters," the numerous black emigrants from the South to Kansas. Comstock was then the secretary of the Kansas Freedmen's Relief Association (1879-1881).

== Personal life ==
In 1848, Comstock married Leslie Wright in Bakewell, Derbyshire until his death in 1851. They had one daughter. After Wright's death, Comstock, their daughter and one of Comstock's sisters moved to Rollin Michigan. In 1858 Comstock remarried to John T. Comstock, until his death in 1884.
