= Lydia Rous =

British headmistress

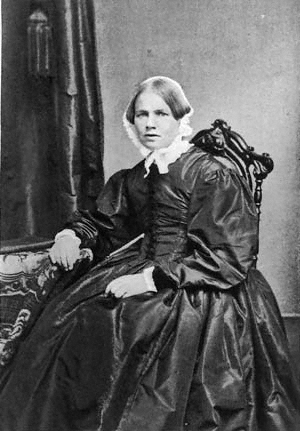
- Born: 24 May 1819; Maidenhead, England
- Died: 15 December 1896 (aged 77); Darlington, England
- Occupation: Headteacher
- Known for: Leading The Mount School

Lydia Rous (24 May 1819 – 15 December 1896) was a British headmistress. She led The Mount School, a girls' boarding school for Quakers in York.

== Life ==
Rous was born in 1819 in Maidenhead. Her parents Mary (born Kekwick) and William Rous were both Quakers and that was the theme of her education. Her father had a shop. Her formal education began at the Quaker school in Croydon when she was ten and from there she went to a similar school in Essex before completing back in Croydon with Sarah and Maria Palmer. She spent five years teaching at the Ackworth School, but she also offered private tuition. Her career began looking after children in their home and later in Darlington. Her high profile appointment was with John Bright which began in 1858 and continued to 1863. Bright lauded her abilities saying that only Queen Victoria had more abilities than her. Rous left Bright and went for the second time to the USA. She went to see her elder sister Elizabeth Rous Comstock, a Quaker minister, was helping with the Underground Railroad, but she also spent time assisting in hospitals that were treating the wounded from the American Civil War. Her sister and her second husband were based in Rollin, Michigan, but her sister would speak across America and visit hospitals, prison camps and runaway slaves to minister.

She was appointed as the lead for the York Quarterly Meeting Girls' School – The Mount School in 1866. The school had originally been founded in 1785.

During her time as Superintendent informal singing was allowed but music and dancing lessons were not. This restriction allowed for more academic subjects and the school gave greater emphasis to algebra, geometry, Latin and logic than the average girls' school at the time.

Her ambition was to create teachers at the school. There had already been some teacher training but under her guidance this was expanded. She continued to lead the school until 1879.

Rous died in Darlington in 1896 where she had been cared for by a brother and sister. In the following year a fund had been established at the Mount School to assist pupils wishing to go on to further education. Further donations have allowed the fund to continue.
