= Friends' School, Saffron Walden =

Friends' School
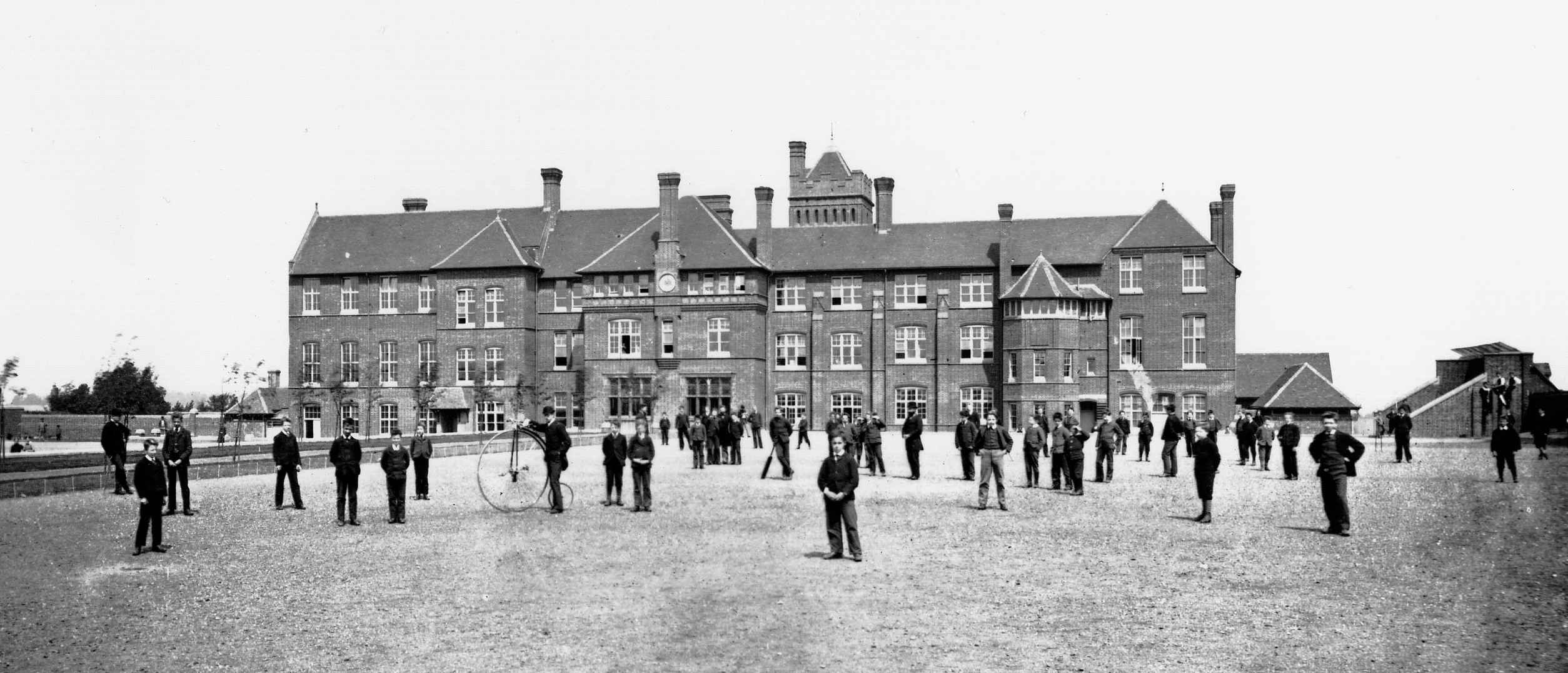
- The school in 1880

Location
- Saffron Walden, Essex, CB11 3EB; England
- Coordinates: 52°00′58″N 0°14′32″E

Information
- Other name: Walden School (2016–17)
- Type: Defunct independent
- Motto: Per Ardua Ad Alta
- Religious affiliation: Quaker
- Established: 1702
- Closed: 2017
- Head: Anna Chaudhri (senior school); Sally Meyrick (prep school)
- Gender: Co-educational
- Age: 3 to 18
- Enrolment: 375
- Houses: 3: Tuke, Mennell and Lister
- Colours: (Lister) (Tuke) (Mennell)
- Fate: Closed as no longer sustainable due to falling pupil numbers, etc.

Friends' School (known as Walden School 2016–17) was a Quaker private co-educational day and boarding school located in Saffron Walden, Essex, situated approximately 12 miles south of the city of Cambridge, England. The school taught pupils between the ages of three and eighteen.

The school closed at the end of the 2017 summer term.

== History ==
Friends' School, Saffron Walden was founded as part of the Quakers' Clerkenwell workhouse in Islington in London in 1703, 50 years after George Fox. The workhouse was for children and the elderly and the school moved out as a separate entity in 1786. It was now nearby in Clerkenwell and now known as the Friends' School. However the new building was damp and ill suited to teaching and learning.

In 1825 the school began operation in Croydon. There was initially 120 places for students who began at the age of nine. Children did not have to be members of the Quakers but these children were accepted first. In 1828 the school had a marriage when Elizabeth Hutchinson married Edward Foster Brady. They were both teachers and both former pupils of the school. In 1833 they became joint heads of the school, although Edward was ill and had been consumptive. He died in 1838 and Elizabeth Brady led the school until 1842.

In 1876 the mayor of Saffron Walden offered a new site for the school and in 1879 the school opened in Saffron Walden.

In September 2016 the school changed its name to Walden School.

On 11 May 2017 it was announced that Walden School would close at the end of the 2016–17 school year due to “continued decline in student numbers”.

== Notable former pupils and associates ==
- Harriett Baldwin, MP for West Worcestershire
- Ruth Barnett (née Michaelis), Holocaust survivor and educator
- Edward Bawden, English painter, illustrator, graphic artist and WWII war artist
- Elizabeth Brady, student here and head of the school
- John Cadman, pioneering figure of English Hockey
- Carola Dunn, author of romance and detective novels
- Ralph Erskine, Sweden-based architect and planner (pupil 1925–1931)
- Matthew Evans, chairman and former managing director of Faber and Faber Ltd, and member of the House of Lords
- Margery Fish, gardener and writer
- Imogen Heap, singer-songwriter, record producer and audio engineer
- Daisy Johnson, writer
- Diana Wynne Jones, novelist, poet and academic (pupil 1946–1952)
- Adam Kendon, linguistician, one of the foremost authorities on the topic of gesture (pupil 1943–1952)
- E. V. Lucas, humorist, essayist and playwright
- Tony Newton (Lord Newton of Braintree), politician
- Deborah Norton, actress
- John Peet, journalist and translator of Karl Marx
- John Raven, botanist
- Matthew Robinson, executive producer of Byker Grove and EastEnders and founder of Khmer Mekong Films (pupil 1958–1963)
- Tom Robinson, singer-songwriter and broadcaster (pupil 1961–1967)
- Jeremy Shearmur, philosopher at Australian National University
- Malcolm Shepherd, politician, businessman and member of the House of Lords (pupil 1929–1935)
- Sally Tuffin, fashion designer and ceramicist
- Emily Young, sculptor

== In popular culture ==
Carola Dunn's book Anthem for Doomed Youth is set at the school.

== See also ==
- List of Friends Schools
