= Anna Southall =

Museum director

Anna Catherine Southall OBE (born 9 June 1948) served as Director of the National Museums and Galleries of Wales from 1998 to 2002.

She was educated at The Mount School, York and the University of East Anglia (BA, 1970). She was Vice Chairman of the Big Lottery Fund from 2006 to 2014.
