= Saffron Walden =

Town in Essex, England

Coordinates: 52.022°N 0.243°E

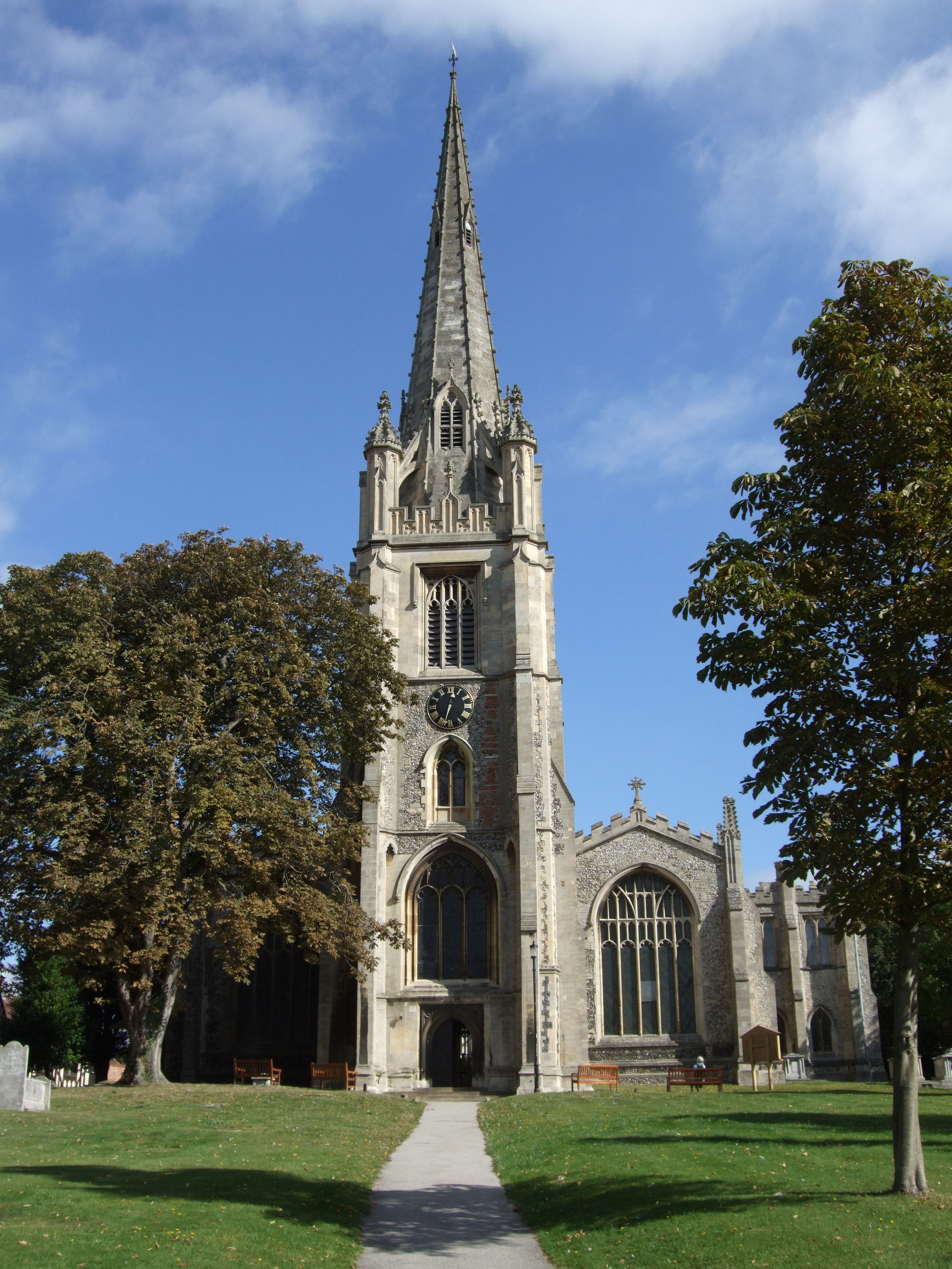
- St Mary the Virgin, Saffron Walden

- Location within Essex
- Population: 17,022 (Parish, 2021); 16,610 (Built up area, 2021)
- OS grid reference: TL541387
- Civil parish: Saffron Walden
- District: Uttlesford
- Shire county: Essex
- Region: East
- Country: England
- Sovereign state: United Kingdom
- Post town: SAFFRON WALDEN
- Postcode district: CB10, CB11
- Dialling code: 01799
- Police: Essex
- Fire: Essex
- Ambulance: East of England
- UK Parliament: North West Essex

Saffron Walden is a market town and civil parish in the Uttlesford district of Essex, England, 12 miles (19 km) north of Bishop's Stortford, 15 miles (24 km) south of Cambridge and 43 miles (69 km) north of London. It retains a rural appearance and some buildings of the medieval period. As well as the town itself, the parish also includes Little Walden and Audley End. At the 2021 census, the built up area had a population of 16,610, and the parish had a population of 17,022.

== History ==
Archaeological evidence suggests continuous settlement on or near the site of Saffron Walden from at least the Neolithic period. It is believed that a small Romano-British settlement and fort – possibly in the area around Abbey Lane – existed as an outpost of the much larger settlement of Cestreforda to the north.

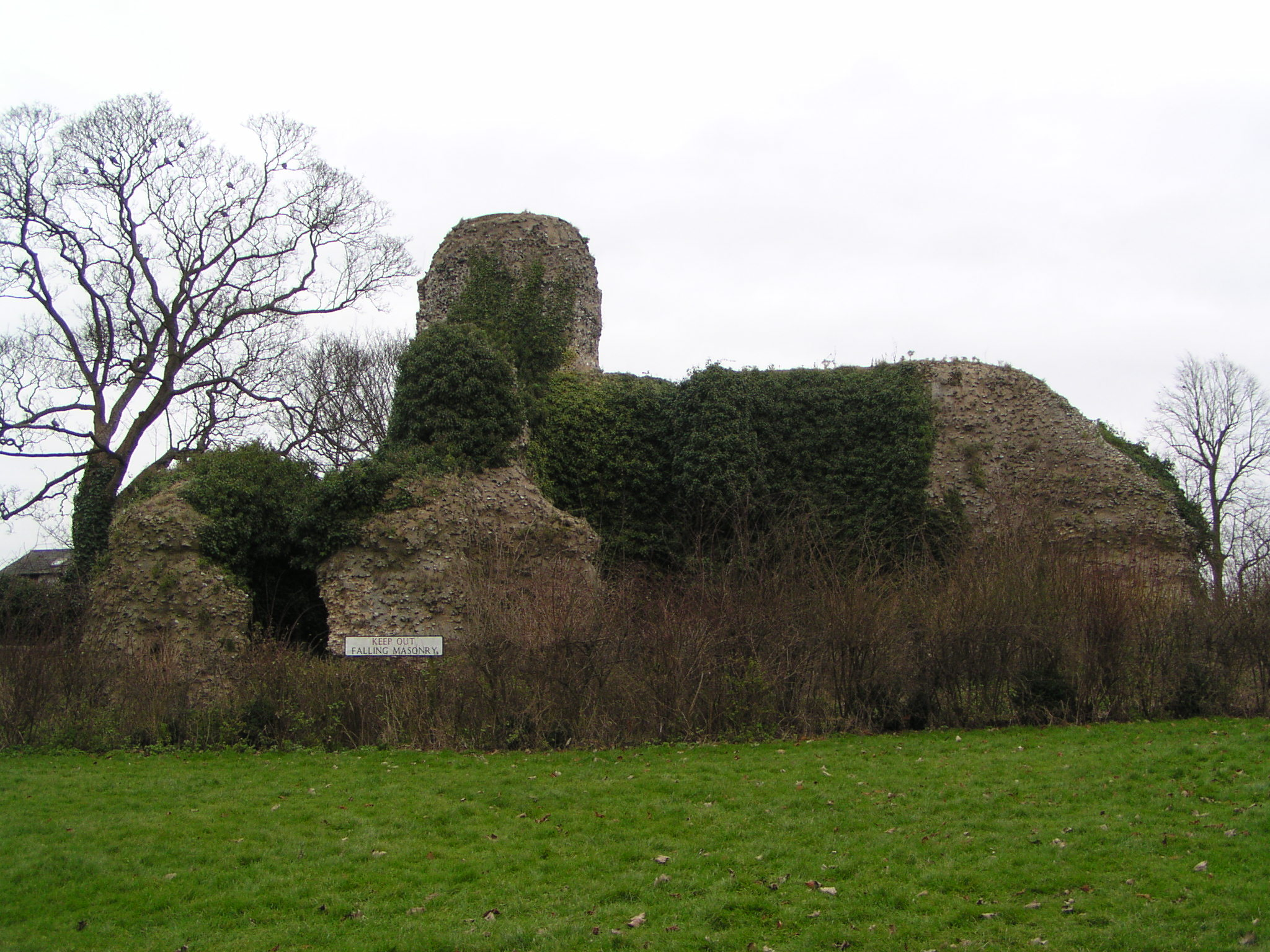
The remains of 12th-century Walden Castle

The town was originally called Walden, derived from the Old English walhdenu meaning 'valley of the Britons'.

After the Norman Conquest of 1066, a stone church was built. Walden Castle, dating from about 1140, may have been built on pre-existing fortifications. A priory, Walden Abbey, was founded in around 1136 under the patronage of Geoffrey de Mandeville, 1st Earl of Essex. The abbey was separated from Walden by Holywell Field. After the dissolution of the monasteries, Sir Thomas Audley converted its cloisters into a dwelling, which was subsequently rebuilt as Audley End House.

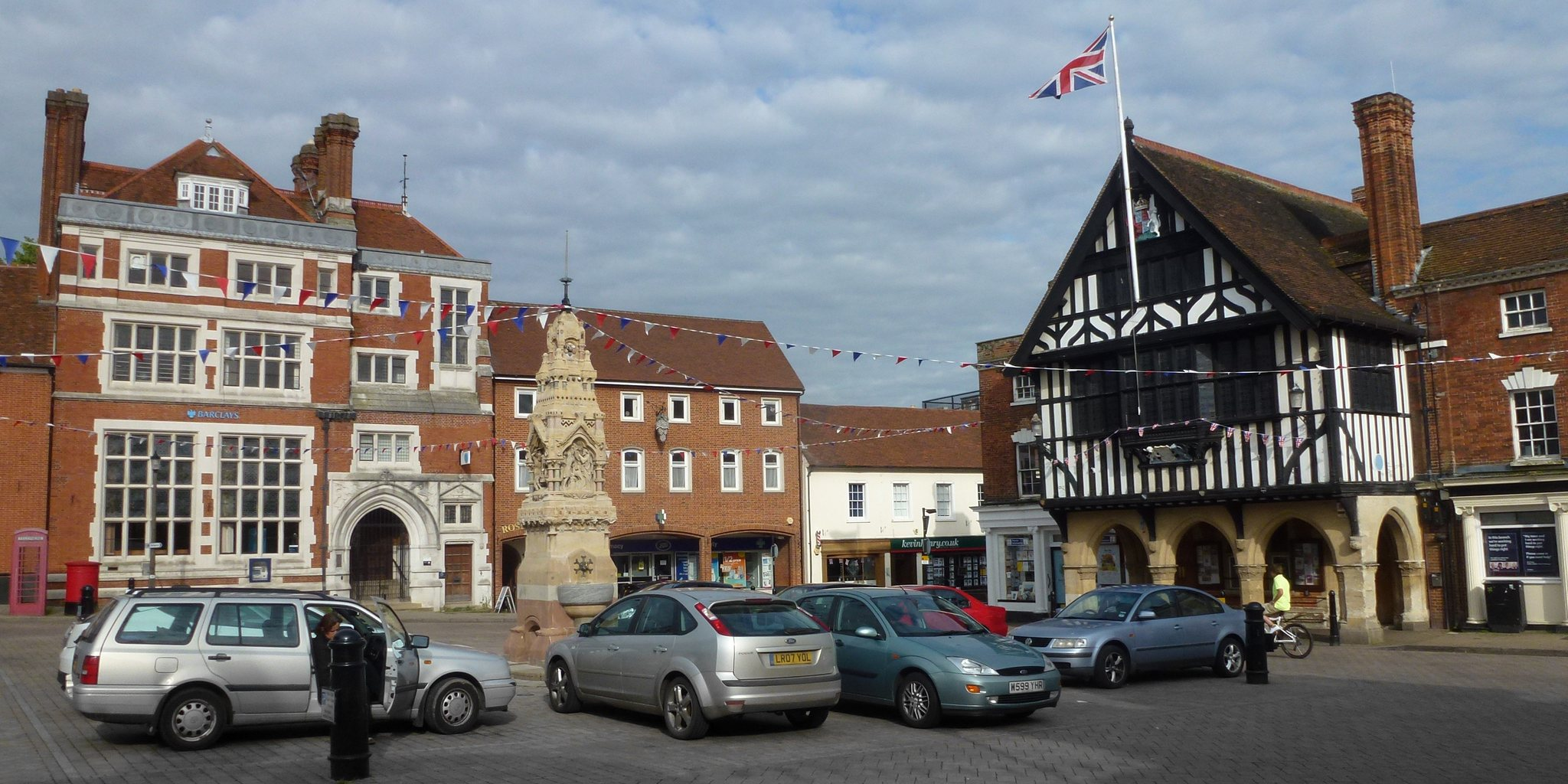
The market square in July 2012, with Saffron Walden Town Hall on the right

In the 13th century there had been a market at nearby Newport. The market was moved to Walden during de Mandeville's tenure, increasing the town's influence. A Tuesday market was held from 1295, and the town was granted its first formal market charter in about 1300. The town then became known as Chepyng (i.e. Market) Walden. The town at that time was largely confined to the castle's outer bailey, but in the 13th century the Battle or Repel Ditches were built or extended to enclose a larger area to the south. The focus of the town moved southwards to Market Square.

The main trading item in medieval times was wool. A guildhall was built by the wool-staplers in the marketplace, but was demolished in 1847 to make way for the Corn Exchange.

=== Saffron ===
In the 16th and 17th centuries the saffron crocus (Crocus sativus) was widely grown, thanks to the town's favourable soil and climate. The stigmas of the flower were used in medicines, as a condiment, in perfume, as an expensive yellow dye, and as an aphrodisiac. The industry gave Walden its present name. In the records of the Court of Common Pleas, the town was called Magna Walden in Hilary Term 1484, and Chipping Walden in the 15th and early 16th centuries, but by the 1540s it had become Saffron Walden.

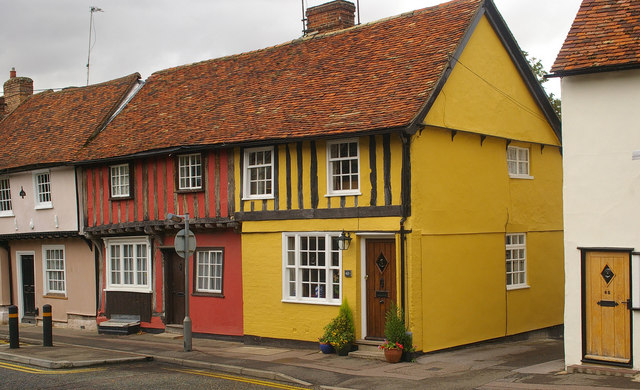
Castle Street contains many historic buildings

=== Puritans and Quakers ===
The town and surrounding area, like much of East Anglia, was strongly Puritan during the 17th century. The population was influenced by the missionary John Eliot. By 1640, Samuel Bass's family and a number of others had departed for the Massachusetts Bay Colony as part of the Great Migration.

Saffron Walden was at the centre of the Eastern Association during the English Civil War. While the town was the headquarters of the New Model Army, Lieutenant-General of Horse Oliver Cromwell paid a 19-day visit in May 1647, taking part in debates to seek a settlement between Parliament and the army. He is thought to have stayed at the Sun Inn.

By the end of the 18th century saffron was no longer in demand, and the industry was replaced by malt and barley. More than 40 maltings stood in the town by the end of the century. The trade was less lucrative than saffron, but the town continued to grow through the 19th century, and had a cattle market, corn exchange and other civic buildings. During this time, Quakers became economically active in the area. The influential Gibsons – one of the founding families of Barclays Bank – aided the construction of several public buildings that remain today, such as the Saffron Walden Museum and the Saffron Walden Town Hall.

The Eastern Counties Railway opened its route from London to Cambridge in 1845, taking a route along the valley of the River Granta to the west of the town. The nearest station to Saffron Walden on that line is Audley End railway station, 2 miles (3 km) south-west of the town at Wendens Ambo. The Saffron Walden Railway was subsequently built as a branch line from Audley End to Bartlow via Saffron Walden railway station, which opened in 1865. The branch line closed as part of the Beeching cuts in 1964, since when Audley End has again been Saffron Walden's nearest station.

Heavy industry arrived after the Second World War. Acrows Ltd, makers of falsework, built premises to the east of the town and became a significant employer and economic influence in the area. For a short time there was a dedicated railway station for the works known as Acrow Halt.

=== Coat of arms and maces ===
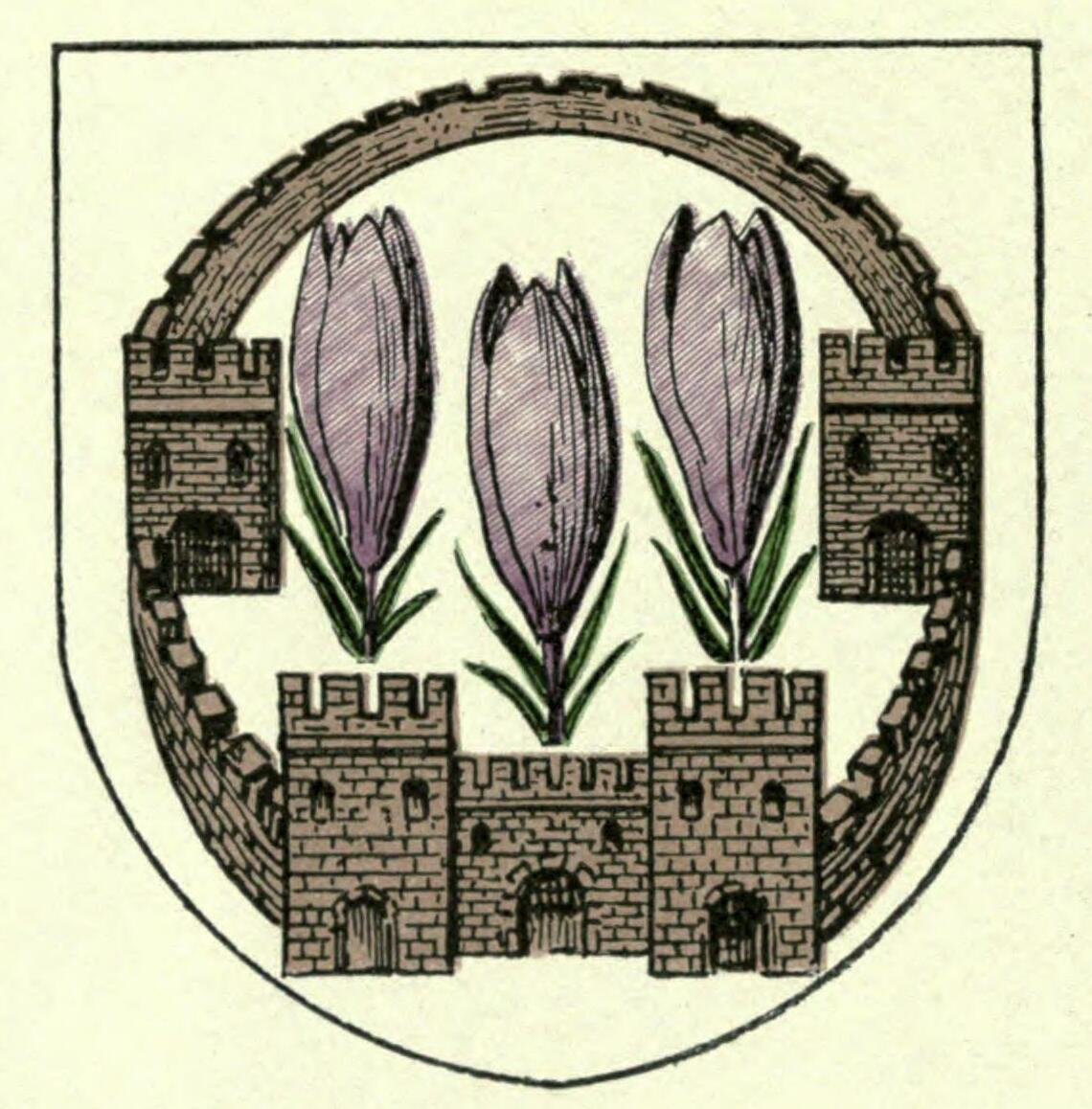
Unofficial arms of Saffron Walden, from a 1916 emblazonment

Saffron Walden's unofficial coat of arms showed the saffron crocus within the walls of the castle in the form of an heraldic pun – as in, "Saffron walled-in". In 1961, a formal coat of arms was granted by the College of Arms and this was adapted in 1974 into its current form.

The town has three ceremonial maces. The large mace was given to Saffron Walden by James II in 1685 and provides an early recording of the unofficial coat of arms. Made of silver gilt, it is approximately 4 feet (1.2 m) long. Two smaller silver maces were bought by the corporation in 1549 to commemorate the granting of a new town charter by Edward VI. This purchase is recorded in the town's Guild of Holy Trinity accounts and reads, "For 2 new maces, weying 18 ownces one quarter and half at 8s. the ownce 7l.7s".

== Sites and buildings of interest ==
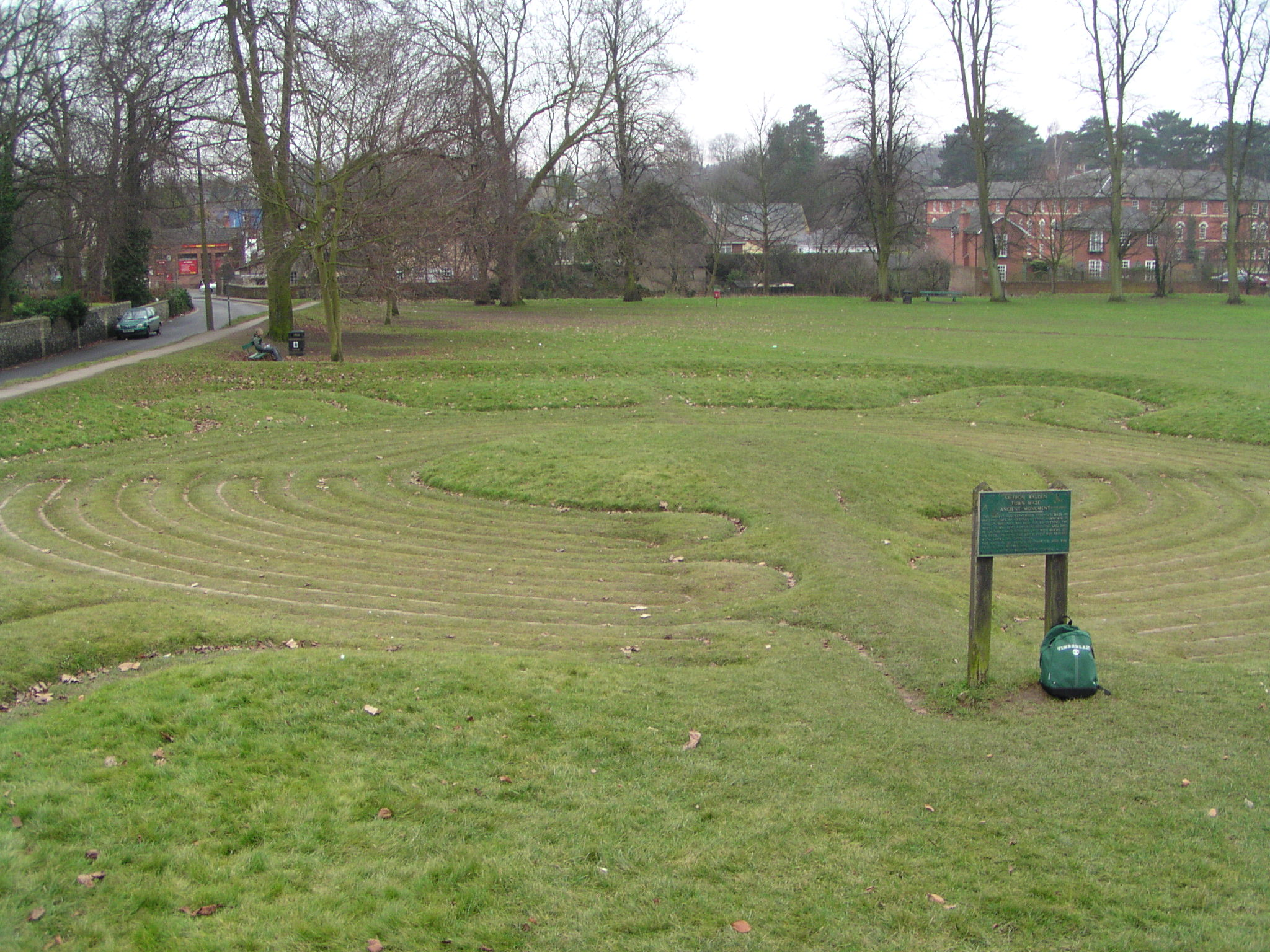
Saffron Walden has the largest turf maze of its type in England

The 12th-century Walden Castle, built or expanded by Geoffrey de Mandeville, the first Earl of Essex, is in ruins. After the medieval period, the castle fell into disuse and much of the flint was taken and used in the construction of local houses and the wall surrounding the Audley End estate. All that remains is the ruined basement.

Near the castle is a turf maze, a series of circular excavations cut into the turf of the common. It is the largest example of this style of maze in England, the main part being about 100 feet (30 m) in diameter. The earliest record of it dates from 1699, although its origin may be earlier. It has been extensively restored several times, most recently in 1979.

The oldest inhabited building in the town is believed to be the former maltings at 1 Myddleton Place. The 15th-century building with a courtyard garden was used by the Youth Hostel Association from 1947 to 2010. It is now used for functions. Pevsner described it as: "without doubt, the best medieval house of Saffron Walden". Other notable early buildings are in Bridge Street, Castle Street and the side streets off the High Street. The High Street contains some late-Georgian and Victorian buildings.

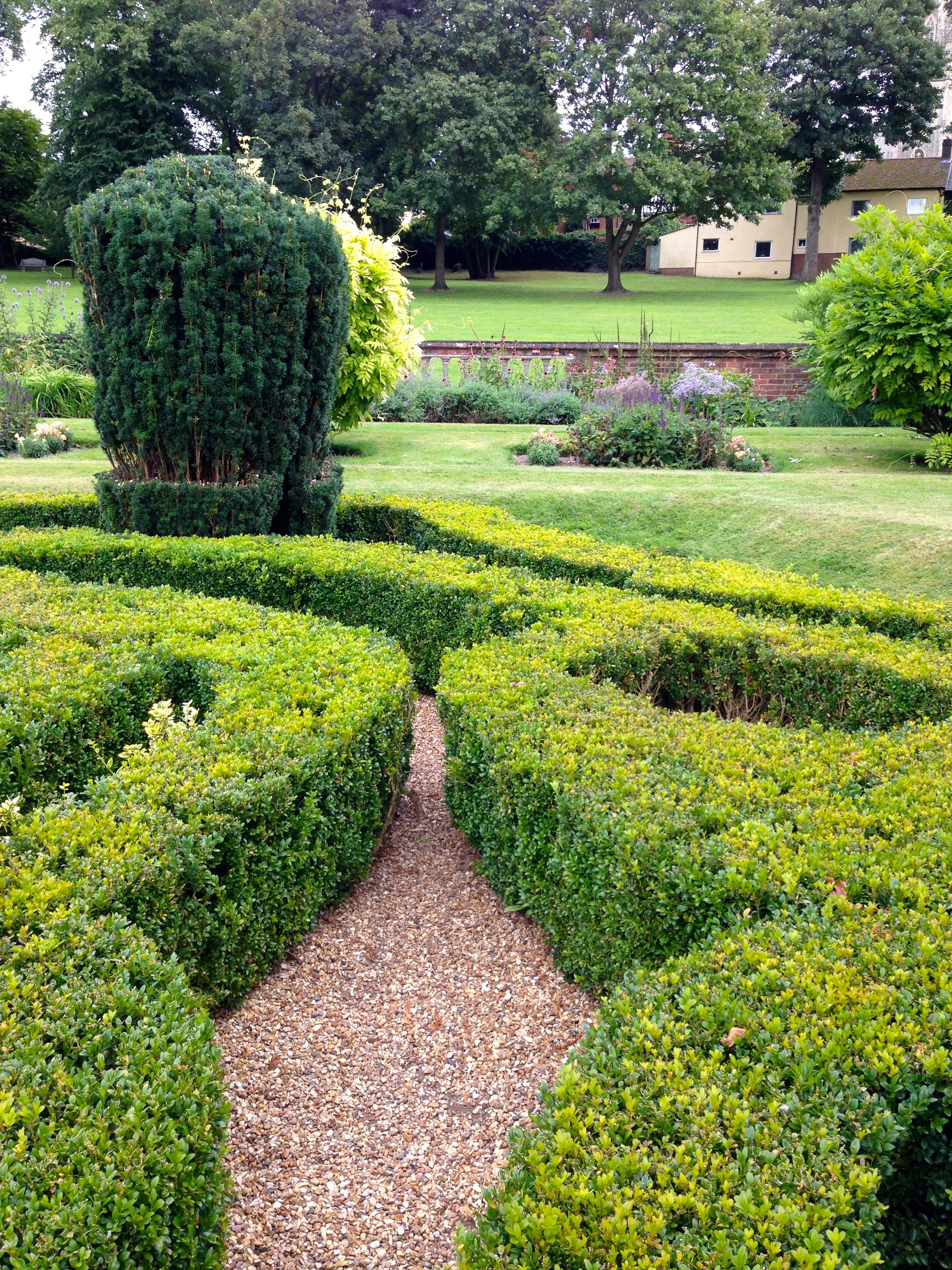
Bridge End Gardens, a group of seven interlinked 19th-century gardens

Bridge End Gardens, seven interlinked gardens – including a maze, rose garden and walled garden – were originally laid out by the Gibson family in about 1840. They have been restored with help from the Heritage Lottery Fund and volunteers.

St Mary the Virgin, Saffron Walden (Church of England) is the largest parish church in Essex. The church dates mainly from the end of the 15th century, when an old smaller church was extensively rebuilt by the master mason John Wastell, who was building King's College Chapel in the nearby city of Cambridge. In 1769 it was damaged by lightning and the repairs, carried out in the 1790s, removed many medieval features. The spire was added in 1832 to replace an older lantern tower. The church is 183 feet (56 m) long and the spire, 193 feet (59 m) high, is the tallest in Essex.

The town's Catholic church, Our Lady of Compassion, is on Castle Street. Created in 1906 from a 16th-century barn, it was restored in 2004–5.

With a long history of non-conformism, Saffron Walden has:

- a Baptist church on the High Street,
- a Quaker Friends Meeting House on the High Street,
- a United Reformed Church on Abbey Lane,
- a Methodist church on Castle Street now occupied as the Community Church by the independent former Gold Street Chapel which was located in Gold Street.

== Governance ==
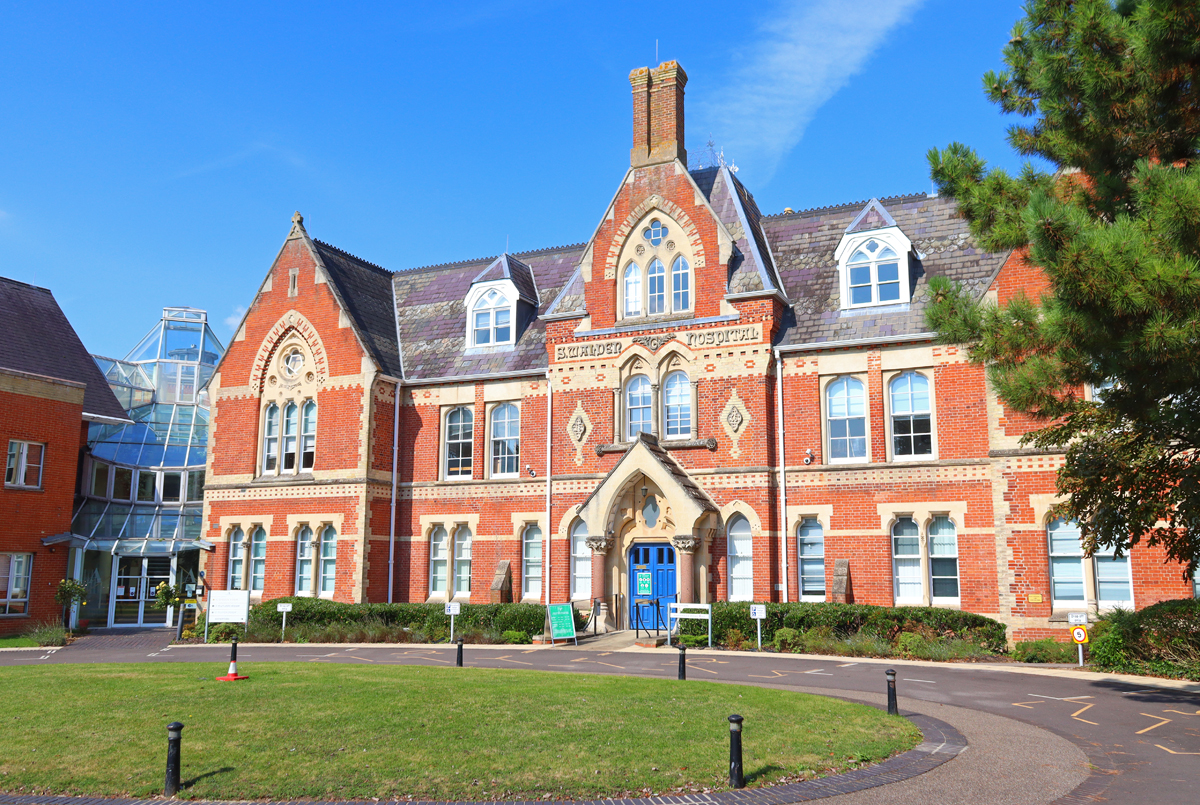
Uttlesford District Council Offices, London Road; built 1865 as Saffron Walden General Hospital

There are three tiers of local government covering Saffron Walden, at parish (town), district, and county level: Saffron Walden Town Council, Uttlesford District Council, and Essex County Council. The town council is based at Saffron Walden Town Hall. The district council is also based in the town, having its headquarters at the former Saffron Walden General Hospital building on London Road.

For national elections, the town forms part of the North West Essex constituency. The MP is Conservative, Kemi Badenoch who is Leader of the Opposition and Leader of the Conservative Party.

The modern constituency was created in 2024, replacing the former Saffron Walden constituency, which had covered the town and an extensive surrounding rural area. Notable former MPs for that constituency included:

- Alan Haselhurst from a by-election in 1977 until his retirement at the 2017 general election. Baron Haselhurst was Chairman of Ways and Means and Deputy Speaker of the House of Commons from 1997 to 2010.
- Rab Butler from 1929 to 1965, former Deputy Prime Minister and Chancellor of the Exchequer, who became Lord Butler of Saffron Walden and is buried at the parish church.

=== Administrative history ===
Saffron Walden was an ancient parish in the Uttlesford hundred of Essex. As well as the town itself, the parish included surrounding rural areas, including Audley End, Little Walden, and Sewards End. The town was incorporated as a borough by a charter from Edward VI in 1550. (Note: The charter was dated 18 February 1549 using the Old Style calendar of the time, being 1550 under New Style dates.) The borough boundary covered the whole parish. Proposals were drawn up in the 1830s to reduce the borough to just cover the town itself, but were not implemented.

In 1836 the borough was reformed to become a municipal borough under the Municipal Corporations Act 1835, which standardised how most boroughs operated across the country.

The borough of Saffron Walden was abolished in 1974 under the Local Government Act 1972, when the area became part of the new Uttlesford district. A successor parish called Saffron Walden was created at the same time, covering the area of the former borough, with its parish council taking the name Saffron Walden Town Council.

Sewards End became a separate parish from Saffron Walden in 2004.

== Demography ==
At the 2021 census, the population of the parish was 17,022, and the population of the Saffron Walden built up area was 16,610. The population of the parish had been 15,504 at the 2011 census.

According to the Office for National Statistics, at the time of the United Kingdom Census 2001, Saffron Walden had a population of 14,313. The 2001 population density was 10,900 inhabitants per square mile (4,209/km^{2}), with a 100 to 94.5 female-to-male ratio. Of those over 16 years old, 45.0 per cent were married, 27.4 per cent were single (never married), and 8.2 per cent divorced. The parish's 6,013 households included 38.5 per cent married couples living together, 31.5 per cent one-person households, 8.4 per cent co-habiting couples, and 7.9 per cent single parents with children. Of those aged 16–74, 22.3 per cent had no academic qualifications, close to the average for Uttlesford (22.0 per cent) and below that for the whole of England (28.9 per cent).

In the 2001 UK census, 73.0 per cent of Saffron Walden residents declared themselves Christian, 0.6 per cent Muslim, 0.4 per cent Buddhist, 0.2 per cent Jewish, and 0.1 per cent Hindu. The census recorded 17.6 per cent as having no religion, 0.4 per cent with an alternative religion, and 7.8 per cent not stating their religion.

== Education ==
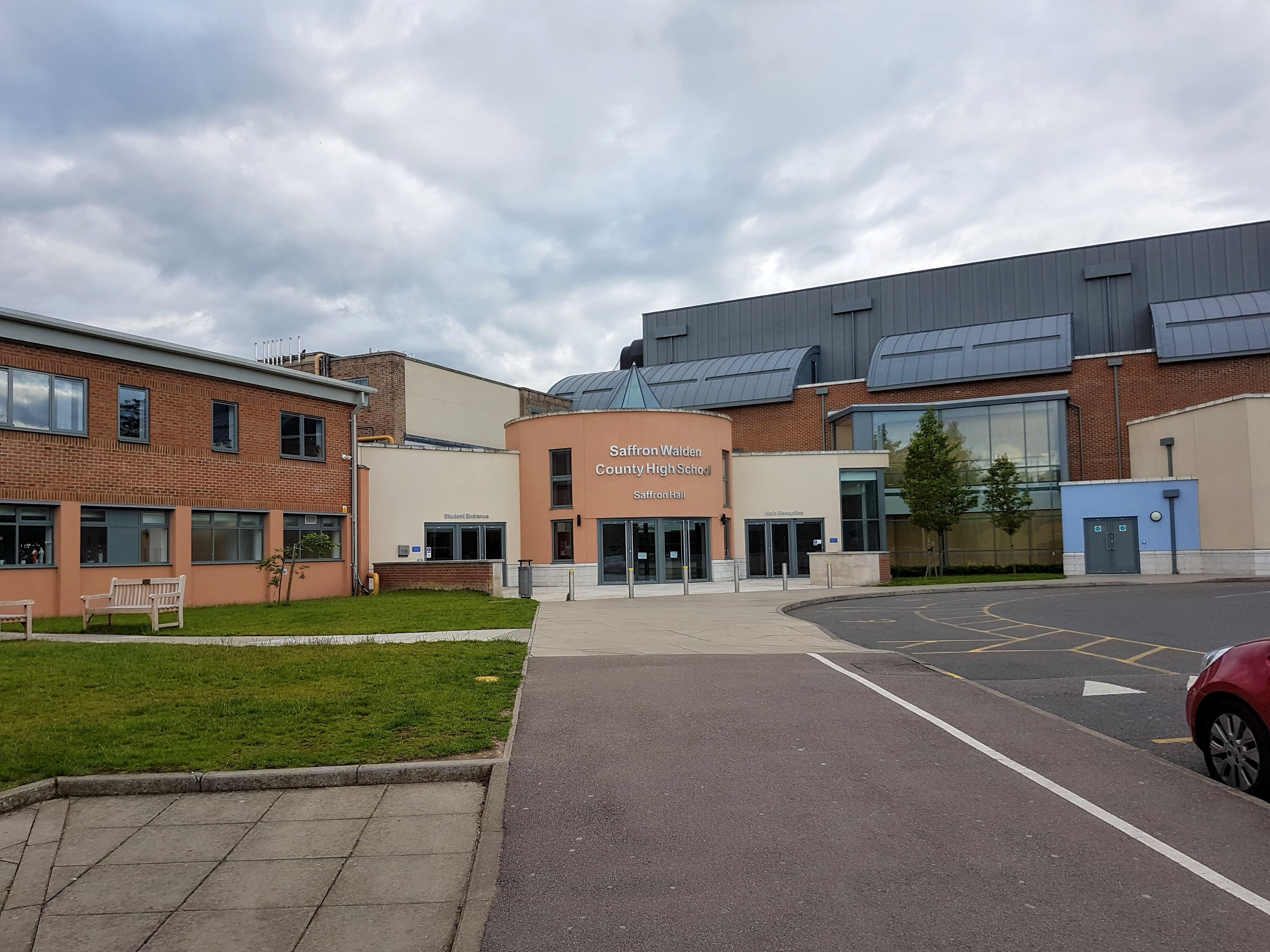
The entrance to the County High School

Saffron Walden County High School is a large co-educational academy with over 2000 pupils. Located to the west of the town centre, it was rated outstanding in its most recent Ofsted report in 2012.

The school replaced Saffron Walden Grammar School, which was established in 1521 by the town's Holy Trinity Guild and Dame Joan Bradbury, a local benefactor. Dame Bradbury also founded Dame Bradbury's School on Ashdon Road. There has been a school on this site since 1317 but it was in 1521 that Dame Bradbury made this school available for local people. For the first four years Dame Bradbury paid the salary of the schoolmaster herself, until the school was endowed in 1535.

Friends' School, renamed Walden School, was a co-educational Quaker independent school with roots dating back to 1702. Its final building, in Mount Pleasant Road, opened in 1879. On 11 May 2017 it was announced that Walden School would close at the end of the 2016–17 school year. Its final day was 7 July 2017.

Saffron Walden College, a teachers' training college for women, closed in 1977.

== Transport ==
=== Railway ===
The nearest station to Saffron Walden is Audley End, which is located 2 miles (3 km) outside the town in the village of Wendens Ambo; regular bus services link it to the town centre.

The station is sited on the West Anglia Main Line between Cambridge and London Liverpool Street. Greater Anglia operates an off-peak service of two trains an hour in each direction, with additional services during peak times; the journey time to London is approximately 55 minutes and approximately 20 minutes to Cambridge. All southbound trains also stop at Tottenham Hale, where there is a London Underground Victoria line station and onward rail connections to Stratford station in east London.

An hourly Greater Anglia service between Stansted Airport and Norwich, via Cambridge and Ely, also stops at Audley End.

=== Buses ===
Regular bus services connect the town with Cambridge, Bishop's Stortford, Haverhill and Stansted Airport. Operators include Stephensons of Essex and Stagecoach East.

=== Roads ===
Saffron Walden is accessed from junction 8 of the M11 when travelling northbound from London and from junction 10 when travelling south from Cambridge.

During the coronavirus pandemic, Essex Highways narrowed some roads in the town centre to make social distancing easier for pedestrians and they reduced some speed limits to 20 miles per hour (32 km/h) as part of their Safer, Greener, Healthier scheme.

=== Air ===
Stansted Airport is located 15 miles (24 km) from the town, while Luton Airport is 43 miles (69 km) away.

Audley End Airfield, a private grass runway, is located about 1 mile (2 km) outside of the town.

== Culture ==
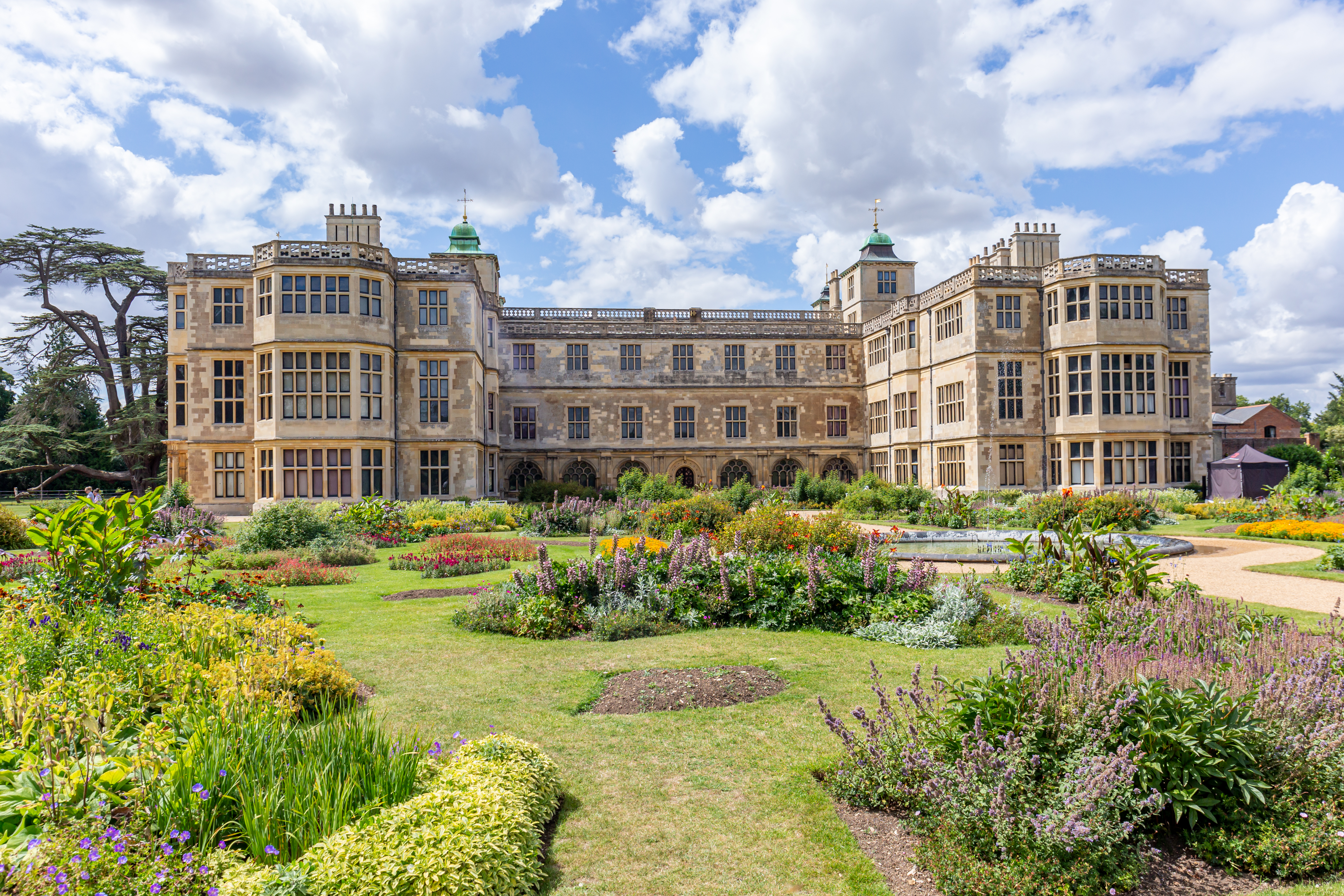
Audley End House, in 2020

Audley End House, once one of the largest mansions in England, is now in the care of English Heritage and is open to the public. During the summer months, picnic concerts and a last night in the style of the BBC Proms have been held in the grounds. Audley End Miniature Railway – originally built by Lord Braybrooke – is a 10 1/4 in (260 mm) gauge railway ride through woodland adjoining Audley End House. The track is 1.5 miles (2.4 km) long and opened in 1964.

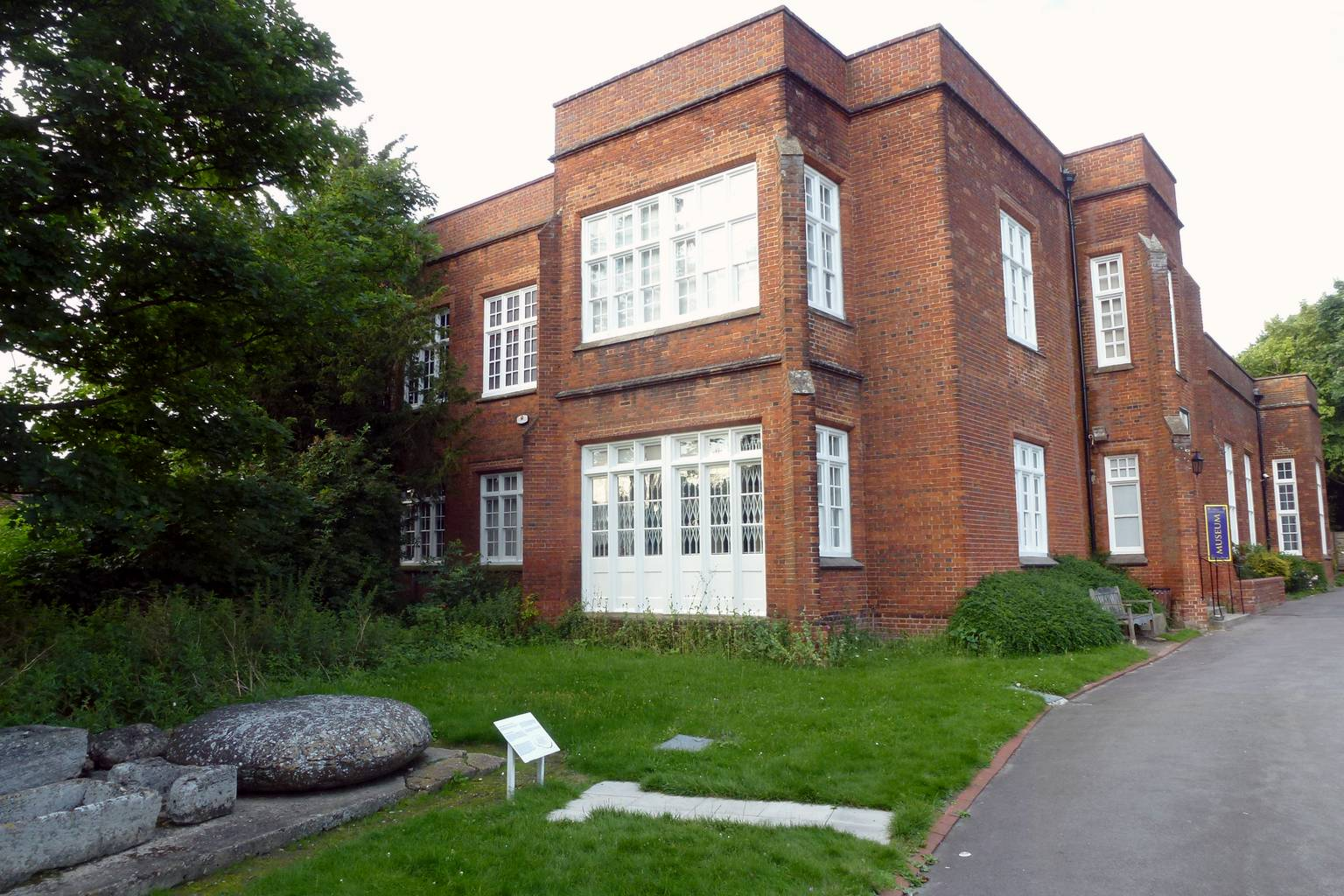
Saffron Walden Museum, with a glacial erratic and stone coffins displayed in the grounds

Saffron Walden Museum, which was established in 1835 by Saffron Walden Natural History Society, is close to the town's castle. The museum had many benefactors from local families, including the Gibsons, Frys and Tukes. The first professional curator, George Nathan Maynard, was appointed in 1889 and his son, Guy Maynard, succeeded him as curator before moving on to Ipswich Museum. It is still owned by the founding society – now Saffron Walden Museum Society – and is managed by Uttlesford District Council. The museum contains the stuffed remains of a lion named Wallace (1812 – 1838), said to have inspired Marriott Edgar's comic poem "The Lion and Albert". It is also home to the mummy of a 7 year old dating to the 3rd century AD.

The Fry Art Gallery exhibits the work of artists who had an association with Saffron Walden and north west Essex, focusing on Great Bardfield Artists. The collection includes extensive artworks and supporting material by Edward Bawden, who lived in the town during the 1970s and 1980s, and Eric Ravilious.

Saffron Hall, which is attached to Saffron Walden County High School, opened in 2013. The 730-seater venue came about as a result of a £10 million donation by an anonymous music loving donor. In 2014, former head of music at the Barbican Centre Angela Dixon became its director.

Saffron Walden Market is a thriving market, with numerous local sellers trading goods, is held every Tuesday and Saturday (and Thursdays in the run up to Christmas); it is attended by local residents like Jamie Oliver.

=== Sport and leisure ===
The Anglo American playing fields, located close to Bridge End Gardens on Catons Lane, are home to the town's cricket club and were donated to Saffron Walden by the US forces after the war. Prior to that, Saffron Walden Cricket Club played on the town's common, with a history of cricket matches recorded back to 1757. A monument at the site commemorates the American airmen and people of Saffron Walden who died in the Second World War.

- Saffron Walden has a non-league football club, Saffron Walden Town F.C., which also plays at Catons Lane.
- There is also a rugby club playing in the London Leagues Saffron Walden rfc and
- A long-distance running and triathlon team.

Lord Butler Leisure Centre is located on Peaslands Road and includes a pool, gym and sports injury clinic.

The Tour de France passed through Saffron Walden in 2014.

Saffron Walden has a well-established hockey club, with its main pitch and clubhouse in Newport and a second pitch at Saffron Walden County High School. The club has eight men's teams, seven women's teams and a large junior section. The women play in Division 2 and the men play in Prem B.

The town's skate park is an American-built facility. It opened in 2007.

=== Music ===
Saffron Walden is the name of a tune often associated with the hymn "Just as I Am". It was written by Arthur Henry Brown (1830–1926) from Essex. He wrote many hymn tunes, which he often named after his favourite places.

=== Media ===
Local news and television programmes are provided by BBC East and ITV Anglia. Television signals are received from the Sandy Heath TV transmitter.

The town is covered by both BBC Essex and BBC Radio Cambridgeshire including Heart East, Greatest Hits Radio East, Star Radio and Radio Forest which broadcast to patients at the Saffron Walden Community Hospital in the town.

The Saffron Walden Reporter and Walden Local are the town's local newspapers.

== Notable residents ==
In alphabetical order:

- Edward Bawden (1903–1989), artist, was resident from 1970 at 2 Park Lane Studio.
- Stig Blomqvist (born 1946) and his son Tom Blomqvist (born 1993), racing drivers, live in the town.
- Elizabeth Butchill (c. 1758–1780), hanged for infanticide, was a native of the town.
- Rab Butler (1902–1982), cabinet minister, was MP for Saffron Walden in 1929–65, before being created Baron Butler of Saffron Walden.
- Jack Cardiff (1914–2009), Oscar-winning cinematographer, lived at 7a High Street.
- Charles Dunstone (born 1964), co-founder and chairman of Carphone Warehouse and chairman of TalkTalk Group, was born in the town.
- James Gapes (1822–1899), born in the town, became mayor of Christchurch, New Zealand.
- George Stacey Gibson (1813–1893), botanist, banker and philanthropist, lived at Hill House, High Street.
- Gabriel Harvey (c. 1552/3–1631), scholar and writer, lived at 13–17 Gold Street.
- Imogen Heap (born 1977), singer and songwriter, was a boarder at the Friends' School.
- Jeff Hordley (born 1970), actor, played Cain Dingle in Emmerdale.
- Gordon Jacob (1895–1984), composer, was resident in 1959–1984 at 1 Audley Road and president of Saffron Walden and District Music Club.
- Ian Lavender (1946–2024), actor, best known as Pike in Dad's Army, lived in the town until 2001.
- Stephen McGann (born 1963), actor, resided in the town. However now lives in Cambridge.
- Jojo Moyes (born 1969), romantic fiction author, lives nearby in Great Sampford.
- Clare Mulley (born 1969), biographer, lives in the town.
- Sarah Ockwell-Smith (born 1976), child-care author, lives in the town.
- Warwick Murray (born 1972) author, professor, distinguished geographer medallist, and singer-songwriter / musician lives in the town.
- Cliff Parisi (born 1960), former EastEnders actor, lives in the town.
- Tom Robinson (born 1950), singer-songwriter, attended the Friends' School in 1961–67.
- Sir Thomas Smith (1513–1577), scholar and diplomat, was born in the town.
- Stan Stammers (born 1961), songwriter and musician, formerly of UK Subs, grew up in the town.
- William Strachey (1572–1621), historian, was born in the town.
- Heidi Thomas (born 1962), TV and film screenwriter, lived in the town. She lived in Cambridge as of 2014.
- Stuart Wardley (born 1975), professional footballer, played for and managed Saffron Walden Town, and remains active in the local community.
- Raymond Williams (1921–1988), cultural critic, divided his time between Saffron Walden and Wales in later life.
- Henry Winstanley (1644–1703), creator of the first Eddystone Lighthouse, was born in nearby Littlebury and lived at 5 Museum Street.
- Diana Wynne Jones (1934–2011), author, attended the Friends School from 1946 to 1952.
- Joseph Warren Zambra (1822–1897), pioneering photographer, optician and scientific instrument maker. Co-founder of Negretti and Zambra.

== Twin towns ==
Saffron Walden is twinned with Bad Wildungen in Germany.

== See also ==
- The Hundred Parishes
- Have with You to Saffron-Walden
