= Colin Beardshaw =

English footballer (1912–1977)

Personal information
- Full name: Ernest Colin Beardshaw
- Date of birth: 26 November 1912
- Place of birth: Crawcrook, England
- Date of death: 22 August 1977 (aged 64)
- Place of death: Southport, England
- Height: 5 ft 11 in (1.80 m)
- Positions: Centre half; full back

Senior career*
Years	Team	Apps	(Gls)
- Shadforth St Cuthbert's
- South Hetton Juniors
193?–1936	South Hetton Colliery Welfare		
1936	Hartlepools United	0	(0)
1936	Gateshead	12	(0)
1936–1938	Stockport County	18	(0)
1938–1946	Bradford City	42	(0)
1945–1946	→ Peterborough United (loan)	22	(0)
1946–1947	Peterborough United	18	(0)
1947–1948	Distillery		
1948	Cork United	0	(0)
1948–1951	Southport	61	(0)
- * Club domestic league appearances and goals

Ernest Colin Beardshaw (26 November 1912 – 22 August 1977) was an English professional footballer who made 133 appearances in the Football League playing for Gateshead, Stockport County, Bradford City and Southport either side of the Second World War. He was on the books of Hartlepools United without playing for their League team, appeared in the Midland League for Peterborough United, was player-coach of Irish League club Distillery, and briefly captained League of Ireland club Cork United. He played either at centre half or as a full back.

== Life and career ==
Beardshaw was born in Crawcrook, County Durham, in 1912. He played local football for Shadforth St Cuthbert's, South Hetton Juniors and South Hetton Colliery Welfare, and was briefly on the books of Hartlepools United as an amateur, before signing for another Third Division North club, Gateshead, also on amateur forms. He went straight into their League side at centre half for the visit to Crewe Alexandra on 29 February, Gateshead won 4–2, and Beardshaw kept his place for the remaining eleven games of the season.

Despite the offer of a professional contract with Gateshead, Beardshaw turned professional with Stockport County at the end of the season. He was a regular for the reserves in the Cheshire League, and appeared twice in the Third Division North Cup, but failed to break into the league team, which won the Third Division North title and gained promotion to the Second Division. His second season with Stockport began like the first, with regular appearances in the Cheshire League, but he held the centre-half spot from January onwards as Stockport finished bottom and returned to the Third Division.

In 1938–39, Beardshaw was ever-present for Bradford City as they finished third in the Third Division North and won the Third Division North Cup, beating Accrington Stanley 3–0 at Valley Parade. He made one appearance in the 1939–40 Football League season before competitive football was abandoned for the duration of the Second World War, and then volunteered for the Royal Air Force.

Beardshaw guested for clubs including Bolton Wanderers, Huddersfield Town, and the Belfast-based Distillery during the war, as well as playing for his parent club. He was demobilised in time to play for Bradford City in the 1945–46 FA Cup, but spent much of that season playing in the first postwar edition of the Midland League with Peterborough United, which he joined formally in the close season, although Bradford retained his Football League registration. He made 40 Midland League appearances in all, and then returned to Irish football.

Beardshaw rejoined Irish League club Distillery as player-coach in July 1947. He helped them reach the finals of the Gold Cup, in which they lost to Belfast Celtic, and the Inter-City Cup, which was shared with the same club, and left after one season to sign for League of Ireland club Cork United. He was appointed captain, and led them through their matches in the 1948–49 Dublin City Cup, but when the club folded before the league programme began, he returned to England and signed for Southport.

It took until the end of his two-month trial to establish himself in the first team, but once his contract was extended he was ever-present in Football League matches in 1949. He played his last Football League match in January 1951 at the age of 38. Over the next few years he acted as trainer of Southport's junior teams, coached the youths, and acted as a scout, all combined with working for British Railways. Beardshaw died in Southport in 1977 at the age of 64.
