= Margery Willoughby =

Margery Gertrude Willoughby
- Born: 13 December 1905; Chapel-en-le-Frith, Derbyshire, England
- Died: 10 June 2001 (aged 95); Wheldrake, York, North Yorkshire, England
- Occupation: Teacher

Margery Gertrude Willoughby (13 December 1905 – 10 June 2001) was a British headteacher and Chair of the Yorkshire Philosophical Society.

== Biography ==
Willoughby attended Manchester High School for Girls and then Girton College, Cambridge where she studied history. After graduation, she worked as a teacher at Nottingham High School for Girls and at Prendergast School. In 1946 she became the headteacher of Mill Mount Grammar School for Girls, York where she remained for the rest of her career.

Whilst in York, Willoughby joined the Yorkshire Philosophical Society. She was elected to its council in 1954 and served as its Chair from 1966 to 1982. At the time of her death she was a Life Vice-President of the society. She also served as Chair of governors of the York College for Girls and was the founding chairperson of local branch of the National Trust, a role she held from 1970–1974. She was a member of York Civic Trust, the Friends of York Minster, and served as a city magistrate.

In 2022, her biography was featured as one of the 100 York Women in an exhibition at the York Castle Museum.
