= Robert W. Cahn =

British metallurgist (1924–2007)

Robert Cahn
- Born: Robert Wolfgang Cahn; 9 September 1924
- Died: 9 April 2007 (aged 82)
- Awards: FRS
- Scientific career
- Workplaces: University of Cambridge
- Doctoral advisor: Egon Orowan

Robert Wolfgang Cahn FRS (9 September 1924 – 9 April 2007) was a British metallurgist whose contributions to physical metallurgy centred on the properties of dislocations. Cahn developed a successful model for the nucleation of recrystallisation, which underpinned research into industrial processes involving high-temperature deformation. He also contributed substantially to the crystallography of uranium. In later life he made a great contribution to scientific editing, editing both scientific textbooks such as the comprehensive Physical Metallurgy, co-edited, with Peter Haasen, a standard reference work in the field.

== Upbringing ==
Cahn was born to an affluent Jewish family in Fürth, in northern Bavaria, Germany, on 9 September 1924. His turbulent childhood undoubtedly had an influence on the determination with which he approached his professional life, "his legendary impatience", and his wide cultural interests.

Cahn's father, Martin Cahn, came from a religious, but assimilated, Jewish family which had included successive heads of Jewish communities in small settlements in Baden. He worked as an accountant for the mirror factory of Robert's maternal grandfather, Hugo Heinemann. Young Robert was raised in a flat in the centre of Fürth, and for three years in a modernist style house on the outskirts. In July 1933, his father's marriage to Else being on the point of collapse and the children having been persecuted on account of their being Jewish, the family fled to Switzerland from where Robert went with his mother and grandfather to Mallorca and Martin to London to establish a new business. Cahn joined his father in London in 1936 and was introduced to the musical soirées and cultural circle of friends his father had developed.

Sent by his father to Maiden Erlegh House School at Earley, Berkshire, a school with absolutely no academic pretensions, he was left largely to his own devices. At the age of fifteen he moved to the Haberdashers' Aske's Boys' School at Cricklewood, but took himself out of the school in 1940. Following a brief interlude in London, he escaped the Blitz to Workington, Cumbria where he had two years of excellent teaching at the local technical school and discovered a lifelong passion for mountain walking.

From the moment he left Germany until his naturalisation in 1947, he was a stateless person. After becoming naturalised as a citizen of the United Kingdom, he developed sufficient English fluency to work as an editor of scientific literature. Reportedly, he had some fluency in a total of four languages.

== University education ==
In 1942, he enrolled at Trinity College, Cambridge to study Metallurgy. There, in 1943, he met Pat Hanson, the daughter of a distinguished professor of metallurgy who was studying English, and who was to become his wife in 1947.

In 1945, he studied for a doctorate under Egon Orowan at the Cavendish Laboratory. The objective of his research was to prove the existence of dislocations, whose existence had been postulated by Orowan and others before the war. Using studies of single crystal wires of zinc, Cahn demonstrated by X-ray diffraction that long strain-free crystallites had formed by recrystallisation following heating of a deformed wire. Optical observation under a microscope showed that these were accurately perpendicular to the glide planes. Consultations with Alan Cottrell at Birmingham had confirmed that this arrangement was to be expected on theoretical grounds if dislocations existed.

== Career ==
Cahn left Cambridge in 1947 to take up a research post at Harwell Atomic Energy Research Establishment with a salary that enabled him to get married. He completed his doctoral research without supervision, Orowan rarely wrote up the work of his doctoral students and Cahn finally wrote it up alone in 1949. At Harwell, Robert continued his researches into the process of "deformation twinning" Crystal twinning where he demonstrated a new type of twinning in uranium crystals. However, as the only person undertaking fundamental research, at Harwell, Cahn felt isolated and in 1951 he moved to Birmingham to the Department of his father in law, Daniel Hanson. Here he supervised research students concentrating on twinning, intermetallics and the formation of crystal nuclei during recrystallisation. These themes remained the centre of Cahn's attention for the remainder of his academic life.

Following a sabbatical at Johns Hopkins University, Baltimore in 1954, he turned down a professorship at Liverpool on the promise of a professorship in Birmingham that never materialised. Cahn moved to a professorship at Bangor in 1962. However the centre of interest of the department, semiconductors, left little room for Cahn's main interests.

Therefore, in 1965 Cahn moved to the University of Sussex to become the first Professor of Materials Science in Britain, developing the country's first courses in materials science. Under his leadership, the department managed to attract excellent staff and research funding and undertake a wide range of well respected research, in particular on metallic glasses and rapid cooling. At this time Cahn both developed his scientific editing and became President of the Materials Science Club.

In 1981-2 the Department at Sussex was the victim of severe cutbacks in the university sector, and the Materials Science Department, with an excellent research reputation but with a small number of undergraduates (due to the unconventional nature of the subject), was earmarked for closure. Cahn took early retirement and went for two stressful years to the University of Paris, Orsay , returning to retirement in Cambridge in 1983. It was in that same year that he was awarded the A. A. Griffith Medal and Prize. He remained there until his death in 2007, from 1986 as an Honorary Research Fellow in Cambridge's Department of Metallurgy and Materials Science . Apart from one year spent in the US in 1985–6, Cahn's main output in these final years was his editing work.

== Editing ==
Cahn became editor of the new Journal of Nuclear Materials in 1959. He was offered the editorship of the first journal in the field, the Journal of Materials Science, in 1964 literally en route between Bangor and Sussex Universities. This was the start of a spectacular burgeoning of the scientific editing work that was to be the trademark of his later years. He says in his memoirs that he regarded the years he devoted to creating this journal as the most important single editorial role he played. He later also acted as an editor of the Journal of Materials Research from 1985 and established a new journal, Intermetallics , in 1992.

In 1961 Cahn started editing the monumental work "Physical Metallurgy, first published in 1965. which went through four editions, the last two edited in collaboration with Peter Haasen of Göttingen. In 1986 Cahn, Haasen and Edward Kramer started work on a new series of multi-authored books, "Materials Science and Technology: A Comprehensive Treatment" which eventually contained 20 volumes, republished in 2005. Two further series of books on solid materials were edited, the Cambridge Solid State Science Series from 1992 and the Pergamon Materials Series from 1992 onwards. In 1998 he was one of six editors in chief for Elsevier's 11-volume Encyclopedia of Materials series.

Cahn also wrote for a wider public. From 1967 until 2001 Cahn was Materials science correspondent for the news and comments section of Nature , the premier British science journal. Popular articles on a wide range of topics were assembled in a book Artifice and Artifacts published in 1992. In 2001 Cahn's book The Coming of Materials Science outlined the development of the subject.

== General ==
Despite his very specialised expertise, Cahn was an intellectual polymath of the old school who pushed hard for the integration of scientific and artistic skills. At Birmingham he organised a well received Art in Science exhibition, at Sussex he was on the governing committee of the Science Policy Research Unit, and he became external examiner for the Liberal Studies in Science course at the University of Manchester. A very widely read man, he was as able to hold forth on literature and art as on science. For example, he contributed a survey of the sociology of innovation. In 2004 Journal of Materials Science published a bibliography including 3 biographies, 10 topical articles, and 16 more philosophical, all relating to the history of materials science.

Cahn was notable for his international range of contacts and the support he gave to the development of international links to promote the development of metallurgy and materials science in developing countries. From 1955 he contributed to the development of metallurgy in Argentina, and made repeated visits to the research centre Instituto de Fisica de Bariloche in the Andes. Later he developed close links with Indian metallurgy and materials science, through former researchers in his departments at Bangor and Sussex, and in his final years his contribution to Chinese metallurgy was recognised with honorary membership of the Chinese Academy of Sciences. He was elected a Fellow of the Royal Society of London in 1991. He was a foreign member of the Göttingen Academy of Sciences and Humanities, the Royal Spanish Academy of Sciences and the Indian National Science Academy.

== Personal life ==
Cahn died of myelodysplasia induced leukaemia on 9 April 2007 in Cambridge, England. His four children includes Andrew Cahn.
