= Andrew Cahn =

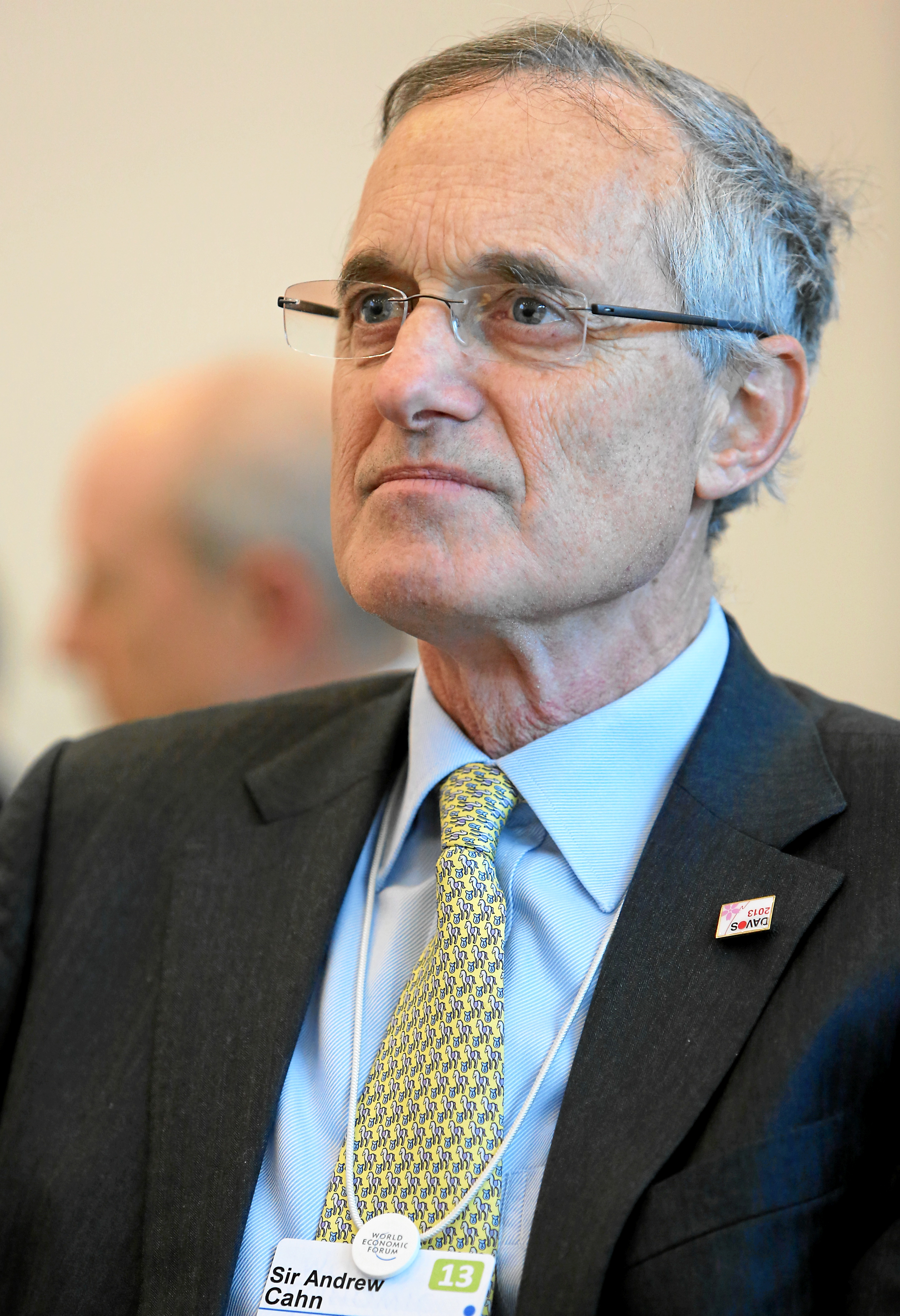
Cahn at the World Economic Forum Annual Meeting in 2013

Sir Andrew Thomas Cahn, KCMG (born 1 April 1951) is Chair of the Council of the Royal Society for the Protection of Birds and a former senior civil servant.

== Career ==
In January 2011, Cahn stepped down after five years in charge of UK Trade & Investment, the government department that promotes exports and attracts foreign direct investment. Prime Minister, David Cameron, said: "Andrew has been a wonderful chief executive of UK Trade & Investment and a fantastic ambassador for the UK. He has been central to the Government’s efforts to make Britain an attractive place to invest and to sell Britain to the world."

After stepping down, Cahn took on a number of non-executive directorships, including Nomura Group, Lloyd's of London and Huawei and pro-bono roles including WWF and the Institute for Government.

Career summary:

- 2015–2020 Non-executive director, Huawei Technologies (UK) and Chair of the Audit and Risk Committees
- 2012–2018 Non-executive director, Nomura International plc
- 2012–2019 Non-executive director, General Dynamics UK
- 2011–2014 chairman Huawei Technologies UK advisory board
- 2011–2012 vice-chairman (Public Policy), Nomura Group
- 2011–2019 Franchise Board of Lloyd's of London
- 2006 – 2011 chief executive officer, UK Trade & Investment
- 2000 – 2006 Director of Government and Industry Affairs, British Airways
- 1997 – 2000 Chef de Cabinet (Chief of Staff) to Neil Kinnock, Vice-President of the European Commission
- 1995 – 1997 Deputy Head of European Secretariat, Cabinet Office
- 1992 – 1995 Principal Private Secretary to the Rt. Hon. William Waldegrave MP, Chancellor of the Duchy of Lancaster and subsequently Minister of Agriculture, Fisheries and Food
- 1988 – 1992 Head of Research Policy, Ministry of Agriculture, Fisheries and Food
- 1984 – 1988 Member of the Cabinet of Lord Cockfield, Vice-President of the European Commission and Commissioner for the Single Market.
- 1982 – 1984 First Secretary, United Kingdom Representation to the European Communities
- 1979 – 1982 Ministry of Agriculture, Fisheries and Food
- 1978 – 1979 Private Secretary to the Permanent Secretary, Ministry of Agriculture, Fisheries and Food
- 1977 – 1978 UK Representation to the European Economic Community
- 1973 – 1977 Ministry of Agriculture, Fisheries and Food

== Personal life/family ==
Cahn is the son of one of the founders of Materials Science, Robert W. Cahn FRS. He was educated at Bedales School and then Trinity College, Cambridge (BA 1st class Hons).

He is married to Virginia Beardshaw, who was Chief Executive of I Can, the children's communications charity; they have one daughter, and two sons.

== Affiliations ==
Cahn is chair of the board of governors of Birkbeck, University of London,. He was a trustee of the Gatsby Charitable Foundation from 1996 to 2023 and has been a governor of the Institute for Government since its foundation in 2008.

He was previously a trustee of the Arvon Foundation, a member of the Government's Financial Services Trade and Investment Board, Board member of CityUK, Chair of the City of London's International Trade and Investment Group, a member of the Advisory Council of the Rector of the University of the Arts, is an Association Member of BUPA and was a member of the Governing Board of Business for New Europe. He has also served as trustee of the Royal Botanic Gardens Kew, where he was Chairman of their Audit Committee, and of Japan Society. Cahn was chair of WWF (UK), a member of the global Board of WWF and Chair of the Audit Committee from April 2014 -June 2020.

He was also formerly a non-executive director at Cadbury Ltd and a Governor of Bedales School.

== Honours ==
Already a Companion of the Order of St Michael and St George (CMG), Cahn was elevated to Knight Commander of the Order of St Michael and St George (KCMG) in the 2009 New Year Honours.

== Controversy ==
Cahn encountered controversy in January 2011, when an internal email he had sent saying the FCO wished to find ways to spend up to its 2010/11 budget ceiling, was leaked to the Daily Mail. In the email, Cahn said: "The FCO is heading for an underspend and wants to get money out of the door."
