= Virginia Beardshaw =

Alumni of the London School of Economics (born 1952)

- Born: June 1952 (age 73); UK
- Education: The Mount School, York
- Spouse: Sir Andrew Cahn
- Children: 3

Virginia Beardshaw, Lady Cahn CBE (born June 1952) is the Chair of the Annual Fund at the London School of Economics and Political Science. She was Chief Executive of the children's communication charity I CAN for 10 years, spanning from 2005 to 2015, a founder Fellow of the King's Fund Institute and a Governor of the London School of Economics. Beardshaw was appointed a CBE in the 2015 New Year Honours list, for services to children with special needs and disabilities.

== Career ==
After working as a Health Services Researcher at Oxford University, Beardshaw became a founder Fellow for the Kings Fund Institute, writing the first Commission report after the new Royal Charter body was founded in 2009. She then worked for the NHS, where her final post was Director of Modernisation for London. Returning to the voluntary sector, she became the British Red Cross's Director of UK Services. She has been vice-chair of ACEVO.

== Personal life ==
She was educated at The Mount School, York. She is married to Sir Andrew Cahn.
