= List of places in Essex =

Some of the larger settlements of Essex

This is a list of towns, villages and most notable hamlets and neighbourhoods in the ceremonial county of Essex (not the historic county).

== A ==
- Abberton
- Abbess Roding
- Abridge
- Aldham
- Alphamstone
- Alresford
- Althorne
- Ardleigh
- Arkesden
- Ashdon
- Asheldham
- Ashen
- Ashingdon
- Audley End
- Aythorpe Roding

== B ==
- Bardfield Saling
- Barnston
- Barrow Hill
- Basildon
- Battlesbridge
- Beauchamp Roding
- Beaumont
- Belchamp Otten
- Belchamp St Paul
- Belchamp Walter
- North Benfleet
- South Benfleet
- Berden
- Berners Roding
- Bicknacre
- Billericay
- Birch
- Birchanger
- Birdbrook
- Blackmore
- Black Notley
- Bobbingworth
- Bocking
- Boreham
- Borley
- Boxted
- Bradfield
- Bradwell-on-Sea
- Bradwell Waterside
- Braintree
- Brentwood
- Brightlingsea
- Broomfield
- Broxted
- Buckhurst Hill
- Bulmer
- Bulphan
- Bures Hamlet
- Bures St Mary
- Burnham-on-Crouch

== C ==
- Canvey Island
- Castle Hedingham
- Chadwell St Mary
- Chafford Hundred
- Chelmsford (the county town)
- Chignall Smealy
- Chigwell
- Childerditch
- Chipping Ongar
- Chrishall
- Clacton-on-Sea
- Clavering
- Coggeshall
- Colchester (the home of the University of Essex)
- Cold Norton
- Colne Engaine
- Corringham
- Cressing

== D ==
- Debden, Epping Forest
- Debden, Uttlesford
- Dedham
- Dengie
- Doddinghurst
- Dovercourt
- Downham
- Drapers Green
- Duddenhoe End

== E ==
- Earls Colne
- Eastend
- East Hanningfield
- East Horndon
- East Mersea
- East Tilbury
- Elmdon
- Elmstead Market
- Elsenham
- Epping

== F ==
- Farnham
- Faulkbourne
- Feering
- Felsted
- Finchingfield
- Fingringhoe
- Flitch Green
- Foulness Island
- Foxearth
- Frating
- Frinton-on-Sea
- Fryerning
- Fyfield

== G ==
- Galleywood
- Gosfield
- Grays
- Great Baddow
- Great Bardfield
- Great Bentley
- Great Bromley
- Great Dunmow
- Great Horkesley
- Great Maplestead
- Great Leighs
- Great Notley
- Great Oakley
- Great Saling
- Great Totham
- Great Wakering
- Great Warley
- Great Yeldham

== H ==
- Hadleigh
- Hadstock
- Halstead
- Harlow
- Harwich
- Hatfield Peverel
- Hawkwell
- Helions Bumpstead
- Henham
- Herongate
- Heybridge
- High Beach
- High Easter
- High Laver
- High Ongar
- Hockley
- Horndon on the Hill
- Horsley Cross
- Horsleycross Street
- Howe Green
- Hullbridge
- Hutton

== I ==
- Ingatestone
- Ingrave

== K ==
- Kelvedon
- Kelvedon Hatch
- Kirby-le-Soken

== L ==
- Laindon
- Lambourne
- Langenhoe
- Langley
- Latchingdon
- Lawford
- Layer de la Haye
- Leaden Roding
- Leigh-on-Sea
- Lexden
- Liston
- Little Baddow
- Little Bentley
- Little Bromley
- Little Dunmow
- Little Horkesley
- Little Maplestead
- Little Totham
- Little Warley
- Loughton

== M ==
- Maldon
- Manningtree
- Margaretting
- Marks Tey
- Mashbury
- Matching Tye
- Messing
- Mistley
- Mount Bures
- Mountnessing
- Mundon

== N ==
- Navestock
- Nazeing
- Newport
- North Benfleet
- North Fambridge
- Northey Island
- North Shoebury
- North Weald Bassett
- Nounsley

== O ==
- Oakwood Park
- Old Heath
- Orsett
- Osea Island
- Ostend
- Ovington

== P ==
- Pale Green
- Parkeston
- Pebmarsh
- Pentlow
- Pilgrims Hatch
- Pitsea
- Pleshey
- Potton Island
- Prittlewell
- Purfleet

== Q ==
- Quendon

== R ==
- Ramsey
- Rawreth
- Rayleigh
- Rayne
- Rettendon
- Ridgewell
- Rochford
- Rowhedge
- Roxwell
- Roydon
- Runwell

== S ==
- Saffron Walden
- Sandon
- Sewards End
- Shelley
- Shellow Bowells
- Shenfield
- Shoeburyness
- Sible Hedingham
- Silver End
- South Benfleet
- South Fambridge
- Southend-on-Sea
- Southminster
- South Ockendon
- South Woodham Ferrers
- St Lawrence Bay
- St. Osyth
- Stanford-le-Hope
- Stansted Mountfitchet
- Stanway
- Stambourne
- Stapleford Abbotts
- Steeple Bumpstead
- Stebbing
- Stisted
- Stock
- Stondon Massey
- Stow Maries
- Sturmer

== T ==
- Takeley
- Tendring
- Terling
- Thorpe-le-Soken
- Thaxted
- Theydon Bois
- Thorrington
- Thundersley
- Thurrock
- Tilbury
- Tilbury Juxta Clare
- Tillingham
- Tiptree
- Tollesbury
- Tolleshunt D’Arcy
- Tolleshunt Knights
- Toot Hill
- Toppesfield
- Two Tree Island

== U ==
- Ugley
- Ugley Green

== V ==
- Vange
- Virley

== W ==
- Wallasea Island
- Waltham Abbey
- Walton-on-the-Naze
- Warley
- Wendens Ambo
- West Bergholt
- Westcliff-on-Sea
- West Hanningfield
- West Horndon
- West Mersea
- West Tilbury
- Wethersfield
- White Colne
- White Court
- White Notley
- Wicken Bonhunt
- Wickford
- Wickham Bishops
- Wickham St. Paul
- Wiggens Green
- Wimbish
- Witham
- Wivenhoe
- Wix
- Woodham Ferrers
- Woodlands Park
- Wormingford
- Wrabness
- Writtle
- Wyatts Green

== Y ==
- Young's End

== See also ==
- List of civil parishes in Essex
- List of settlements in Essex by population
- List of places in England
