= Grade II* listed buildings in Braintree (district) =

There are over 20,000 Grade II* listed buildings in England. This page is a list of these buildings in the district of Braintree in Essex.

== List of buildings ==
Name	Location	Type	Completed (Note: The date given is the date used by Historic England as significant for the initial building or that of an important part in the structure's description.)	Date designated	Grid ref. (Note: The grid reference is based on the British national grid reference system, sometimes known as OSGB36, used by the Ordnance Survey.) Geo-coordinates	Entry number (Note: The "List Entry Number" is a unique number assigned to each listed building and scheduled monument by Historic England.)	Image
Street Farmhouse	Ashen	House	Early 16th century	7 August 1952	TL7468342380; 52°03′08″N 0°32′46″E	1123004	Upload Photo
Bevingdon House	Belchamp Otten	House	c.1772	7 August 1952	TL8135142128; 52°02′52″N 0°38′36″E	1308998	Bevingdon House More images
Belchamp Hall, including outbuilding at rear	Belchamp Walter	Country house	c.1720	12 November 1955	TL8264240688; 52°02′04″N 0°39′40″E	1169581	Belchamp Hall, including outbuilding at rear More images
Barn approximately 25 metres north north east of Birdbrook Hall	Birdbrook	Barn	17th century	16 May 1984	TL7072241274; 52°02′37″N 0°29′17″E	1122347	Upload Photo
Eagle Farm Cottages	Birdbrook	Farmhouse	19th century	7 August 1952	TL7244942777; 52°03′24″N 0°30′50″E	1122345	Eagle Farm Cottages More images
Parish Church of St Augustine	Birdbrook	Parish church	Late 11th/early 12th century	21 June 1962	TL7067041150; 52°02′33″N 0°29′14″E	1317398	Parish Church of St Augustine More images
Card's	Black Notley	House	Late 15th/early 16th century	9 May 1979	TL7449720266; 51°51′13″N 0°31′56″E	1122806	Card's More images
Church of St Peter and St Paul	Black Notley	Parish church	12th century	21 December 1967	TL7614720722; 51°51′26″N 0°33′23″E	1147111	Church of St Peter and St Paul More images
Church of St Mary the Virgin, Pattiswick (redundant)	Pattiswick, Bradwell	House	Mid-13th century	21 December 1967	TL8167124041; 51°53′07″N 0°38′18″E	1168451	Church of St Mary the Virgin, Pattiswick (redundant) More images
Butlers Hall Farmhouse	Bulmer	Farmhouse	15th century	7 August 1952	TL8361837408; 52°00′17″N 0°40′25″E	1169693	Butlers Hall Farmhouse More images
Parsonage Hall	Bures Hamlet	Farmhouse	15th century	7 August 1952	TL9009833710; 51°58′10″N 0°45′57″E	1122842	Upload Photo
Castle Hedingham United Reformed Church	Castle Hedingham	Congregational chapel	c.1842	15 October 1984	TL7840535390; 51°59′18″N 0°35′48″E	1122952	Upload Photo
Hedingham Castle House	Castle Hedingham	House	c. 1718–19	21 June 1962	TL7879435889; 51°59′34″N 0°36′10″E	1122962	Hedingham Castle House More images
Hedingham Castle, bridge spanning dry moat between inner and outer baileys and including attached retaining wall to north west	Castle Hedingham	Moat	c.1496	21 June 1962	TL7875235881; 51°59′33″N 0°36′08″E	1122960	Hedingham Castle, bridge spanning dry moat between inner and outer baileys and including attached retaining wall to north west More images
The Vicarage, including section of curved wall attached to left and right of house	Castle Hedingham	House	18th century	21 June 1952	TL7846535439; 51°59′19″N 0°35′52″E	1338045	Upload Photo
Chapel Hotel	Coggeshall	Cross-wing house	Late 14th century	31 October 1966	TL8500422610; 51°52′17″N 0°41′09″E	1337968	Chapel Hotel More images
Cooperative Stores	Coggeshall	Timber-framed house	c.1600	2 May 1953	TL8515222737; 51°52′21″N 0°41′17″E	1337951	Cooperative Stores More images
Creag Dhu	Coggeshall	Timber-framed house	14th/15th century	31 October 1966	TL8516322715; 51°52′20″N 0°41′18″E	1306727	Creag Dhu More images
Houchin's Farmhouse	Coggeshall	Farmhouse	c.1590	2 May 1953	TL8708423548; 51°52′45″N 0°43′00″E	1123187	Houchin's Farmhouse More images
Langan's Restaurant premises 35 yards north of junction of Church Street and Stoneham Street	Coggeshall	House	15th century	2 May 1953	TL8501522651; 51°52′18″N 0°41′10″E	1306051	Langan's Restaurant premises 35 yards north of junction of Church Street and Stoneham Street More images
Part of the White Hart Hotel	Coggeshall	Timber-framed house	15th century	2 May 1953	TL8500622539; 51°52′15″N 0°41′09″E	1123119	Part of the White Hart Hotel More images
Royal Oak	Coggeshall	Jettied house	Early 17th century	31 October 1966	TL8495422787; 51°52′23″N 0°41′07″E	1123101	Royal Oak
The Cricketers Public House	Coggeshall	Market hall	Late 14th century	24 June 1983	TL8492522526; 51°52′14″N 0°41′05″E	1337596	The Cricketers Public House More images
The Fleece Public House	Coggeshall	Timber-framed house	15th century	2 May 1953	TL8477622498; 51°52′14″N 0°40′57″E	1123893	The Fleece Public House More images
The Old Bull	Coggeshall	Cross-wing house	16th century	31 October 1966	TL8515922761; 51°52′22″N 0°41′18″E	1168720	The Old Bull More images
Thorough Inn	Coggeshall	Public house		31 October 1966	TL8510122586; 51°52′16″N 0°41′14″E	1169392	Thorough Inn More images
The Woolpack Inn	Coggeshall	Cross-wing house	14th century	2 May 1953	TL8529922942; 51°52′27″N 0°41′25″E	1168802	The Woolpack Inn More images
15, Grange Hill	Coggeshall	House	Late 14th century	13 May 1975	TL8499222191; 51°52′03″N 0°41′08″E	1123111	15, Grange Hill
47, 49 and 51 Queen Street	Coggeshall	Timber-framed house	Early 17th century	31 October 1966	TL8522122889; 51°52′26″N 0°41′21″E	1123128	47, 49 and 51 Queen Street More images
14 and 15, Market Hill	Coggeshall	House	c. 1600	31 October 1966	TL8502522588; 51°52′16″N 0°41′10″E	1170113	14 and 15, Market Hill More images
6 and 6a, East Street	Coggeshall	Flats	Late 14th to early 16th century	31 October 1966	TL8504822555; 51°52′15″N 0°41′12″E	1123146	6 and 6a, East Street More images
14, East Street	Coggeshall	Cross-wing house	15th/early 16th century	2 May 1953	TL8508222556; 51°52′15″N 0°41′13″E	1123147	14, East Street More images
52 and 54, Church Street	Coggeshall	Timber-framed house	1565	31 October 1966	TL8519922763; 51°52′22″N 0°41′20″E	1169046	52 and 54, Church Street More images
1, Brickhouse Road	Colne Engaine	House	16th century	3 February 1986	TL8559930754; 51°56′40″N 0°41′56″E	1337910	Upload Photo
Boundary wall to south, east and north-east of Colne Priory	Earls Colne	Boundary wall	Early 15th century	21 June 1962	TL8654828807; 51°55′35″N 0°42′42″E	1123234	Boundary wall to south, east and north-east of Colne Priory
Granary/stables block 70 metres south of Cressing Temple Farmhouse	Cressing Temple	Timber-framed granary	Late 16th century	21 December 1967	TL7991118632	1123867	Upload Photo
Newneys Farmhouse	Fairstead	House	15th century	13 March 1986	TL7494316543; 51°49′12″N 0°32′13″E	1123450	Upload Photo
Troys Hall	Fairstead	House	16th century	2 May 1953	TL7752716973; 51°49′23″N 0°34′28″E	1123457	Upload Photo
Little Troys	Faulkbourne	House	Late 16th century	13 March 1986	TL7902316355; 51°49′02″N 0°35′45″E	1123462	Upload Photo
Ancillary building 6 metres south-east of Feeringbury Manor	Feering	Chapel	15th century	21 December 1967	TL8635821543; 51°51′41″N 0°42′18″E	1123828	Upload Photo
Cobham Oak Cottages	Feering	Aisled house	1250–1300	22 January 1986	TL8720619596; 51°50′37″N 0°42′58″E	1123836	Upload Photo
Feering House	Feering	House	14th–16th century	21 December 1967	TL8664119304; 51°50′28″N 0°42′28″E	1123833	Upload Photo
Feeringbury Manor	Feering	Aisled house	c.1300	2 May 1953	TL8633121558; 51°51′41″N 0°42′17″E	1306710	Feeringbury Manor More images
Sun Cottage	Feering	House	15th century	21 December 1967	TL8661919286; 51°50′28″N 0°42′27″E	1337605	Upload Photo
The Sun Inn	Feering	Country house	Early 16th century	2 May 1953	TL8661319280; 51°50′27″N 0°42′27″E	1123832	The Sun Inn More images
Barn approximately 25 metres west of Nortofts Farmhouse	Finchingfield	Barn	17th century	21 December 1967	TL7048031579; 51°57′24″N 0°28′47″E	1123492	Upload Photo
Springmede	Finchingfield	Timber-framed house	Early 17th century	21 December 1967	TL6847632874; 51°58′08″N 0°27′04″E	1122724	Upload Photo
Church of St Peter and St Paul	Foxearth	Parish church	c.1350	21 June 1962	TL8358144765; 52°04′15″N 0°40′38″E	1216708	Church of St Peter and St Paul More images
Foxearth Hall	Foxearth	Cross-wing house	Late 15th/early 16th century	7 August 1952	TL8326744943; 52°04′21″N 0°40′21″E	1338318	Upload Photo
Gestingthorpe Hall	Gestingthorpe	House	17th century or earlier	7 August 1952	TL8103838652; 52°01′00″N 0°38′13″E	1307107	Upload Photo
Moat Farmhouse	Gestingthorpe	Farmhouse	Late 14th century	7 August 1952	TL8159136824; 52°00′01″N 0°38′38″E	1337982	Moat Farmhouse More images
Highgates Cottages	Gosfield	House	Early 15th century or earlier	7 August 1952	TL7810429538; 51°56′09″N 0°35′22″E	1122936	Upload Photo
Barn approximately 60 metres SSW of Great Bardfield Hall	Great Bardfield	Aisled barn	Early 14th century	17 May 1985	TL6773230184; 51°56′42″N 0°26′20″E	1337760	Upload Photo
Bridge & Great Bardfield Watermill	Great Bardfield	Bridge & watermill	Early 19th century	21 December 1967	TL6799831150; 51°57′12″N 0°26′36″E	1337813	Bridge & Great Bardfield Watermill More images
Gobions	Great Bardfield	House	16th century	21 December 1967	TL6745430466; 51°56′51″N 0°26′06″E	1123473	Upload Photo
Great Lodge	Great Bardfield	House	Early 17th century	2 May 1953	TL6942929048; 51°56′03″N 0°27′47″E	1123499	Upload Photo
Place House	Great Bardfield	House	18th century	2 May 1953	TL6741030339; 51°56′47″N 0°26′04″E	1337792	Upload Photo
Rear wing of Bank House	Great Bardfield	Guildhall	Late 15th century	21 December 1967	TL6753030562; 51°56′54″N 0°26′10″E	1123478	Upload Photo
6, 7 and 8 Brook Street	Great Bardfield	House	15th century	21 December 1967	TL6767530554; 51°56′54″N 0°26′18″E	1123467	Upload Photo
Parish Church of St Mary	Great Henny	Parish church	Late 11th/12th century	21 June 1962	TL8675037786; 52°00′26″N 0°43′10″E	1123259	Parish Church of St Mary More images
Dyne's Hall	Great Maplestead	House	Late 17th century	7 August 1952	TL8055433070; 51°58′00″N 0°37′37″E	1168338	Dyne's Hall More images
Barn adjoining road and approximately 50 metres north of Piccott's Farmhouse	Great Saling	Barn	Early 15th century	2 January 1985	TL7083225696; 51°54′13″N 0°28′54″E	1122786	Upload Photo
Church of St James	Great Saling	Parish church	14th century	21 December 1967	TL6999925805; 51°54′17″N 0°28′11″E	1147381	Church of St James More images
Saling Hall	Great Saling	House	Late 17th century	2 May 1953	TL6999825856; 51°54′19″N 0°28′11″E	1147360	Saling Hall More images
The Old Rectory	Great Yeldham	House	15th century	7 August 1952	TL7567738750; 52°01′10″N 0°33′32″E	1338029	Upload Photo
The White Hart Public House	Great Yeldham	House	c.1500	7 August 1952	TL7617637753; 52°00′37″N 0°33′56″E	1123017	The White Hart Public House More images
Bluebridge House	Greenstead Green and Halstead Rural	House	Early and late 18th century	7 August 1952	TL8264929720; 51°56′10″N 0°39′20″E	1337934	Upload Photo
Stanstead Hall	Greenstead Green and Halstead Rural	House	Mid-16th century	7 August 1952	TL8269228880; 51°55′42″N 0°39′21″E	1170482	Stanstead Hall More images
Holy Trinity Church	Halstead	Church	1843–44	16 March 1978	TL8083730478; 51°56′36″N 0°37′47″E	1122421	Holy Trinity Church More images
Old Townford Mill	Halstead	Mill	1807	24 February 1950	TL8129830396; 51°56′33″N 0°38′10″E	1122457	Old Townford Mill More images
Trinity House	Halstead	House	Mid-17th century	24 February 1950	TL8094130499; 51°56′37″N 0°37′52″E	1122420	Trinity House More images
22 and 24, High Street	Halstead	House	Latter half 18th century	24 February 1950	TL8140530686; 51°56′42″N 0°38′17″E	1338312	22 and 24, High Street
26, High Street	Halstead	Chantry college	1411	24 February 1950	TL8138930678; 51°56′42″N 0°38′16″E	1169344	26, High Street
Hatfield Place	Hatfield Peverel	House	1791–95	13 March 1986	TL7852411443; 51°46′23″N 0°35′10″E	1337808	Upload Photo
Parish Church of St Andrew	Hatfield Peverel	Parish church	Late 15th/early 16th century	13 March 1986	TL7970111017; 51°46′08″N 0°36′11″E	1308736	Parish Church of St Andrew More images
Termitts Farmhouse	Hatfield Peverel	Farmhouse	15th century	7 May 1976	TL7903513349; 51°47′25″N 0°35′40″E	1123403	Upload Photo
The Crown Public House	Hatfield Peverel	Public house	15th century	13 March 1986	TL7873811604; 51°46′28″N 0°35′22″E	1337810	The Crown Public House More images
The Priory	Hatfield Peverel	House	c.1750	18 May 1978	TL7962910854; 51°46′03″N 0°36′07″E	1308731	Upload Photo
Boblow House	Helions Bumpstead	House	16th century	21 June 1962	TL6530940515; 52°02′18″N 0°24′31″E	1122356	Upload Photo
Parish Church of St Andrew	Helions Bumpstead	Parish church	13th century	21 June 1962	TL6513641664; 52°02′56″N 0°24′24″E	1338347	Parish Church of St Andrew More images
Parsonage House	Helions Bumpstead	House	Late 16th century	21 June 1962	TL6589942448; 52°03′20″N 0°25′06″E	1165334	Upload Photo
Bridgefoot House	Kelvedon	House	Late 16th century	2 May 1953	TL8611718055; 51°49′48″N 0°41′59″E	1337648	Upload Photo
Chambers & Dormers & Gables	High St, Kelvedon	House	16th/17th century	2 May 1953	TL8639619103; 51°50′22″N 0°42′15″E	1170862	Upload Photo
Easterford Mill	Kelvedon	Watermill	18th century	21 December 1967	TL8669419069; 51°50′20″N 0°42′31″E	1171251	Easterford Mill More images
Hole Farmhouse	Kelvedon	House	19th century	29 July 1988	TL8484017216; 51°49′23″N 0°40′50″E	1123803	Upload Photo
Numbers 180A, B and C, and wing to east in Swan Street	Kelvedon	House	16th century	2 May 1953	TL8648519173; 51°50′24″N 0°42′20″E	1337625	Numbers 180A, B and C, and wing to east in Swan Street More images
Orchard House and Post Office	Kelvedon	House	15th/early 16th century	2 May 1953	TL8636719065; 51°50′21″N 0°42′14″E	1170818	Orchard House and Post Office More images
Red House	Kelvedon	House	16th/17th century	2 May 1953	TL8578018515; 51°50′04″N 0°41′42″E	1169951	Red House More images
St Mary's House	Kelvedon	House	15th century	25 June 1974	TL8595218377; 51°49′59″N 0°41′51″E	1305733	St Mary's House More images
26–30 High Street	Kelvedon	House	Late 16th century	25 June 1974	TL8599618524; 51°50′04″N 0°41′53″E	1337621	Upload Photo
Round Hill House	Lamarsh	House	Early 16th century	21 June 1962	TL8857336834; 51°59′53″N 0°44′44″E	1122858	Upload Photo
Glebe House	Liston	House	14th century	17 May 1984	TL8530444381; 52°04′00″N 0°42′07″E	1122336	Upload Photo
Church of St John the Baptist	Little Maplestead, Braintree	Parish church	c.1340	21 June 1962	TL8224833997; 51°58′28″N 0°39′07″E	1338017	Church of St John the Baptist More images
Church of St Mary the Virgin	Ovington	Parish church	12th century	21 June 1962	TL7632742559; 52°03′12″N 0°34′13″E	1277192	Church of St Mary the Virgin More images
Barn 80 metres WNW of Great Priory Farmhouse	Panfield	Barn	15th century	25 November 1983	TL7359225865; 51°54′15″N 0°31′19″E	1337829	Upload Photo
Parish Church of St Mary the Virgin	Panfield	Church	15th century	21 December 1967	TL7386025344; 51°53′58″N 0°31′32″E	1123400	Parish Church of St Mary the Virgin More images
Marvel's Garden	Pebmarsh	House	c.1400	12 November 1984	TL8504232704; 51°57′43″N 0°41′31″E	1122833	Upload Photo
World's End Farmhouse	Pebmarsh	House	c.1570	7 August 1952	TL8416532163; 51°57′27″N 0°40′44″E	1308939	Upload Photo
Larks in the Wood	Pentlow	House	Late 15th/early 16th century	7 August 1952	TL8059344985; 52°04′26″N 0°38′01″E	1232780	Upload Photo
Pannels Ash Farmhouse	Pentlow	Farmhouse	13th century	21 June 1962	TL7971544295; 52°04′04″N 0°37′14″E	1277133	Upload Photo
Pentlow Hall	Pentlow	Jettied house	15th century	7 August 1952	TL8120646241; 52°05′05″N 0°38′36″E	1232611	Upload Photo
Pentlow Street Farmhouse	Pentlow Street, Pentlow	Farmhouse	Late 15th century	17 May 1984	TL8204945878; 52°04′53″N 0°39′19″E	1232705	Pentlow Street Farmhouse More images
Rayne Hall	Rayne Hall Green, Rayne	House	Late 15th century	2 May 1953	TL7321722962; 51°52′42″N 0°30′54″E	1147693	Upload Photo
Appletrees	Ridgewell	House	16th century	24 September 1976	TL7363041056; 52°02′27″N 0°31′49″E	1338373	Upload Photo
Hill Farmhouse	Ridgewell	House	Late 16th century	7 August 1952	TL7445441026; 52°02′25″N 0°32′32″E	1338336	Upload Photo
Little Meadowend	Ridgewell	House	c.1600	16 May 1984	TL7470540290; 52°02′01″N 0°32′44″E	1122314	Upload Photo
Oak Cottage and The Nook	Ridgewell	House	Early 16th century	21 June 1962	TL7380340920; 52°02′22″N 0°31′58″E	1122322	Upload Photo
The Mill House	Ridgewell	House	16th century	16 May 1984	TL7329640785; 52°02′18″N 0°31′31″E	1317177	Upload Photo
Rivenhall Place	Rivenhall	House	16th century	1 March 1950	TL8198219016; 51°50′24″N 0°38′25″E	1122598	Upload Photo
Garretts	Shalford	House	c.1600	21 December 1967	TL7177027240; 51°55′02″N 0°29′46″E	1147765	Upload Photo
Redfants Manor	Shalford	House	Mid-16th century	2 May 1953	TL7138429638; 51°56′20″N 0°29′30″E	1123379	Upload Photo
Alderford Mill	Sible Hedingham	Watermill	18th century	21 June 1962	TL7848233918; 51°58′30″N 0°35′50″E	1122888	Alderford Mill More images
Church of St Peter	Sible Hedingham	Parish church	14th century	21 June 1962	TL7757034363; 51°58′46″N 0°35′03″E	1122897	Church of St Peter More images
Greys Hall	Sible Hedingham	House	c.1714	21 June 1962	TL7766034397; 51°58′47″N 0°35′08″E	1276585	Upload Photo
The Old Rectory	Sible Hedingham	House	c.1714	7 August 1952	TL7766734234; 51°58′41″N 0°35′08″E	1233454	Upload Photo
The former Red Lion Public House	Stambourne	House	c. 1500	7 August 1952	TL7208638794; 52°01′15″N 0°30′24″E	1317140	The former Red Lion Public House More images
Brick House	Steeple Bumpstead	House	19th century	7 August 1952	TL6820441648; 52°02′52″N 0°27′05″E	1338387	Upload Photo
Latchleys Farmhouse	Steeple Bumpstead	Farmhouse	17th/18th century	7 August 1952	TL6712439598; 52°01′47″N 0°26′05″E	1338362	Latchleys Farmhouse More images
The Ancient House	Steeple Bumpstead	House	16th century	21 June 1962	TL6808941129; 52°02′35″N 0°26′58″E	1122307	Upload Photo
The Gun House	Steeple Bumpstead	House	Late 16th century	7 August 1952	TL6795641029; 52°02′32″N 0°26′51″E	1122308	Upload Photo
The Moot Hall	Steeple Bumpstead	Moot hall	Late 16th century	7 August 1952	TL6801741052; 52°02′33″N 0°26′54″E	1146551	The Moot Hall More images
Baytree Farmhouse	Stisted	Farmhouse	Early 16th century	2 May 1953	TL7916223354; 51°52′48″N 0°36′06″E	1171048	Upload Photo
Kentishes Farmhouse	Stisted	Farmhouse	Late 16th century	2 May 1953	TL7911926235; 51°54′21″N 0°36′09″E	1123898	Upload Photo
Stisted Hall	Stisted	Country house	1823–25	6 September 1988	TL7951224667; 51°53′30″N 0°36′26″E	1170996	Upload Photo
The Linnetts	Sturmer	House	Late 15th/early 16th century	16 May 1984	TL7048343497; 52°03′49″N 0°29′08″E	1338393	Upload Photo
Kendalls	Terling	Timber-framed house	Mid-16th century	13 March 1986	TL7664014915; 51°48′18″N 0°33′38″E	1337801	Upload Photo
Owls Hill House	Terling	Cross-wing house	Late 14th century	13 March 1986	TL7697315077; 51°48′23″N 0°33′56″E	1337824	Upload Photo
Parish Church of All Saints	Terling	Parish church	Early 13th century	13 March 1986	TL7731614817; 51°48′14″N 0°34′13″E	1123411	Parish Church of All Saints More images
Terling Place	Terling	Country house	1772–73	2 May 1953	TL7736714625; 51°48′08″N 0°34′16″E	1123407	Terling Place More images
Terling Stores and Post Office	Terling	Cross-wing house	Late 14th century	13 March 1986	TL7732714960; 51°48′19″N 0°34′14″E	1147405	Terling Stores and Post Office More images
The Old Vicarage	Terling	Jettied house	14th/15th century	13 March 1986	TL7702315050; 51°48′22″N 0°33′59″E	1308470	The Old Vicarage More images
Tudor House	Terling	Cross-wing house	16th century	13 March 1986	TL7732514872; 51°48′16″N 0°34′14″E	1147379	Tudor House More images
United Reformed Church	Terling	Congregational chapel	1752–53	13 March 1986	TL7724914867; 51°48′16″N 0°34′10″E	1123410	United Reformed Church More images
Vine Cottage and Church View	Terling	Jettied house	14th century	13 March 1986	TL7727314878; 51°48′16″N 0°34′11″E	1308572	Upload Photo
Tilbury Hall	Tilbury Juxta Clare	House	18th/19th century	7 August 1952	TL7583440069; 52°01′52″N 0°33′42″E	1122988	Upload Photo
Bradfields	Harrow Hill, Toppesfield	Farmhouse	Mainly 16th century	7 August 1952	TL7259736555; 52°00′02″N 0°30′46″E	1122999	Upload Photo
Olivers Farmhouse	Toppesfield	Farmhouse	Late 16th century	7 August 1952	TL7448036750; 52°00′06″N 0°32′25″E	1122997	Upload Photo
Church of St John the Evangelist	Twinstead	Parish church	1859–60	21 June 1962	TL8611936697; 51°59′51″N 0°42′35″E	1306308	Church of St John the Evangelist More images
Codham Mill And Mill House	Wethersfield	Mill		2 May 1953	TL7353628169	1123325	Codham Mill And Mill House More images
Great Codham Hall	Wethersfield	House	16th century	21 December 1967	TL7382528058; 51°55′26″N 0°31′35″E	1337873	Upload Photo
Littleacres	Wethersfield	House	18th/19th century	19 March 1986	TL7358231571; 51°57′20″N 0°31′29″E	1337872	Upload Photo
Simm's Farmhouse	Wethersfield	House	16th century or earlier	21 December 1967	TL7120931003; 51°57′04″N 0°29′24″E	1123356	Upload Photo
Spice's Farmhouse	Wethersfield	House	16th/17th century	21 December 1967	TL7300829379; 51°56′10″N 0°30′55″E	1306774	Upload Photo
St George's House	Wethersfield	House	c.1600	21 December 1967	TL7117531296; 51°57′14″N 0°29′22″E	1337878	Upload Photo
The Priest House	Wethersfield	Continuous jetty house	Early 16th century	21 December 1967	TL7303429348; 51°56′09″N 0°30′56″E	1123312	The Priest House More images
Valley Farmhouse	Wethersfield	Farmhouse	Early 16th century	21 December 1967	TL7288229809; 51°56′24″N 0°30′49″E	1123308	Upload Photo
Wright's Farmhouse	Wethersfield	Farmhouse	14th century	18 May 1978	TL7393131278; 51°57′10″N 0°31′47″E	1168807	Upload Photo
Baggarett's Farmhouse	White Colne	Farmhouse	16th century	10 April 1987	TL8711431933; 51°57′16″N 0°43′18″E	1123184	Upload Photo
Colneford House	White Colne	House	1685	7 August 1952	TL8681929068; 51°55′44″N 0°42′57″E	1337920	Upload Photo
Parish Church of St Andrew	White Colne	Parish church	12th century	21 June 1962	TL8797529946; 51°56′11″N 0°43′59″E	1170815	Parish Church of St Andrew More images
White Notley Hall	White Notley	House	16th century	2 May 1953	TL7842818344; 51°50′07″N 0°35′18″E	1122738	Upload Photo
Catley Cross House	Wickham St. Paul	Cross passage house	Last quarter 16th century	19 July 1984	TL8449735602; 51°59′18″N 0°41′08″E	1338002	Upload Photo
Church of All Saints	Wickham St. Paul	Parish church	14th century	21 June 1962	TL8271337133; 52°00′09″N 0°39′37″E	1168870	Church of All Saints More images
Avenue House and Newbury House	Witham	House	1757	1 March 1950	TL8226014769; 51°48′07″N 0°38′31″E	1122576	Upload Photo
Freebourne's House	Witham	House	Largely 17th century	1 March 1950	TL8227014687; 51°48′04″N 0°38′31″E	1306394	Upload Photo
High House	Witham	House	18th century after 1757	1 March 1950	TL8222914629; 51°48′02″N 0°38′29″E	1122587	Upload Photo
Midland Bank	Witham	House	18th century	1 March 1950	TL8211514464; 51°47′57″N 0°38′23″E	1122591	Upload Photo
Roslyn House	Witham	House	18th century	1 March 1950	TL8224414721; 51°48′05″N 0°38′30″E	1338220	Upload Photo
Spread Eagle Hotel	Witham	Jettied house	15th century	1 March 1950	TL8213814494; 51°47′58″N 0°38′24″E	1122590	Spread Eagle Hotel More images
23–27, Bridge Street	Witham	Jettied house	Early 16th century	1 March 1950	TL8182114103; 51°47′46″N 0°38′07″E	1122602	Upload Photo
117 and 119 Newland Street	Witham	House	18th century	1 March 1950	TL8199214313; 51°47′52″N 0°38′16″E	1306348	Upload Photo
129, Newland Street	Witham	House	18th century	1 March 1950	TL8196714272; 51°47′51″N 0°38′15″E	1338228	Upload Photo
Black Notley Lodge	Notley Road, Braintree	House	Late 17th or early 18th century	22 March 1957	TL7592921586; 51°51′54″N 0°33′13″E	1171947	Upload Photo
Bocking Hall	Bocking	House	17th century	25 October 1951	TL7569525754; 51°54′09″N 0°33′09″E	1338237	Upload Photo
Boleyns	Bocking	House	Late 18th century	25 October 1951	TL7601324398; 51°53′25″N 0°33′23″E	1170835	Upload Photo
Bradford House	Braintree	Timber-framed house	18th century	25 October 1951	TL7599023740; 51°53′04″N 0°33′21″E	1122543	Upload Photo
Bradford Mill	Bocking	Mill	18th century	25 October 1951	TL7624824328; 51°53′23″N 0°33′35″E	1170364	Bradford Mill More images
Church of St Michael	Braintree	Church	12th–13th century	25 October 1951	TL7560722937; 51°52′38″N 0°32′59″E	1338293	Church of St Michael More images
Dial House Inn	Bocking	House	1603	25 October 1951	TL7619424284; 51°53′21″N 0°33′32″E	1338247	Upload Photo
Doreward's Hall	Bocking	House	1579	25 October 1951	TL7626025442; 51°53′59″N 0°33′38″E	1170740	Doreward's Hall More images
Georgian House	Bocking	House	18th century	25 October 1951	TL7600323791; 51°53′06″N 0°33′21″E	1170198	Upload Photo
Lyons Hall	Lyons Hall	House	18th century	25 October 1951	TL7756625428; 51°53′57″N 0°34′46″E	1122469	Upload Photo
Maysent House	Bocking	House	c.1691	25 October 1951	TL7601924093; 51°53′15″N 0°33′23″E	1122551	Upload Photo
Swan Inn	Braintree	Inn	Late 16th century	25 October 1951	TL7571723134; 51°52′45″N 0°33′05″E	1338242	Swan Inn More images
The Constitutional Club and Shops	Braintree	House	18th century	25 October 1951	TL7577523096; 51°52′43″N 0°33′08″E	1338263	Upload Photo
The Old Manor House	Braintree	House	17th century	25 October 1951	TL7572523129; 51°52′45″N 0°33′06″E	1338266	Upload Photo
Town Hall including screens and public lavatories adjoining north east and south	Braintree	Town hall	1926–28	27 April 1992	TL7585423018; 51°52′41″N 0°33′12″E	1235026	Town Hall including screens and public lavatories adjoining north east and south More images
Wall to the Church of St Mary the Virgin	Bocking	Wall	16th century	29 November 1973	TL7568125660; 51°54′06″N 0°33′08″E	1305850	Wall to the Church of St Mary the Virgin
Wentworth House	Bocking	House	1679	25 October 1951	TL7601624078; 51°53′15″N 0°33′23″E	1170324	Upload Photo
4, Bradford Street	Bocking	Timber-framed house	18th century	25 October 1951	TL7604323806; 51°53′06″N 0°33′23″E	1122553	Upload Photo
11, Bradford Street	Bocking	House	18th century	25 October 1951	TL7596823705; 51°53′03″N 0°33′19″E	1170171	Upload Photo
77–81, Bradford Street	Bocking	House	1590	25 October 1951	TL7601824023; 51°53′13″N 0°33′23″E	1338246	Upload Photo
75, Bradford Street	Bocking	House	18th century	22 March 1957	TL7602324016; 51°53′13″N 0°33′23″E	1122549	Upload Photo
114–118, Bradford Street	Bocking	Jettied house	Early 16th century	25 October 1951	TL7610924192; 51°53′18″N 0°33′28″E	1305938	114–118, Bradford Street
35–39 Church Lane	Bocking	House	Late 16th century	25 October 1951	TL7596424424; 51°53′26″N 0°33′20″E	1170825	Upload Photo

== See also ==
Grade I listed buildings in Braintree
