= Baythorne End =

Hamlet in Essex, England

Coordinates: 52.05681°N 0.51404°E

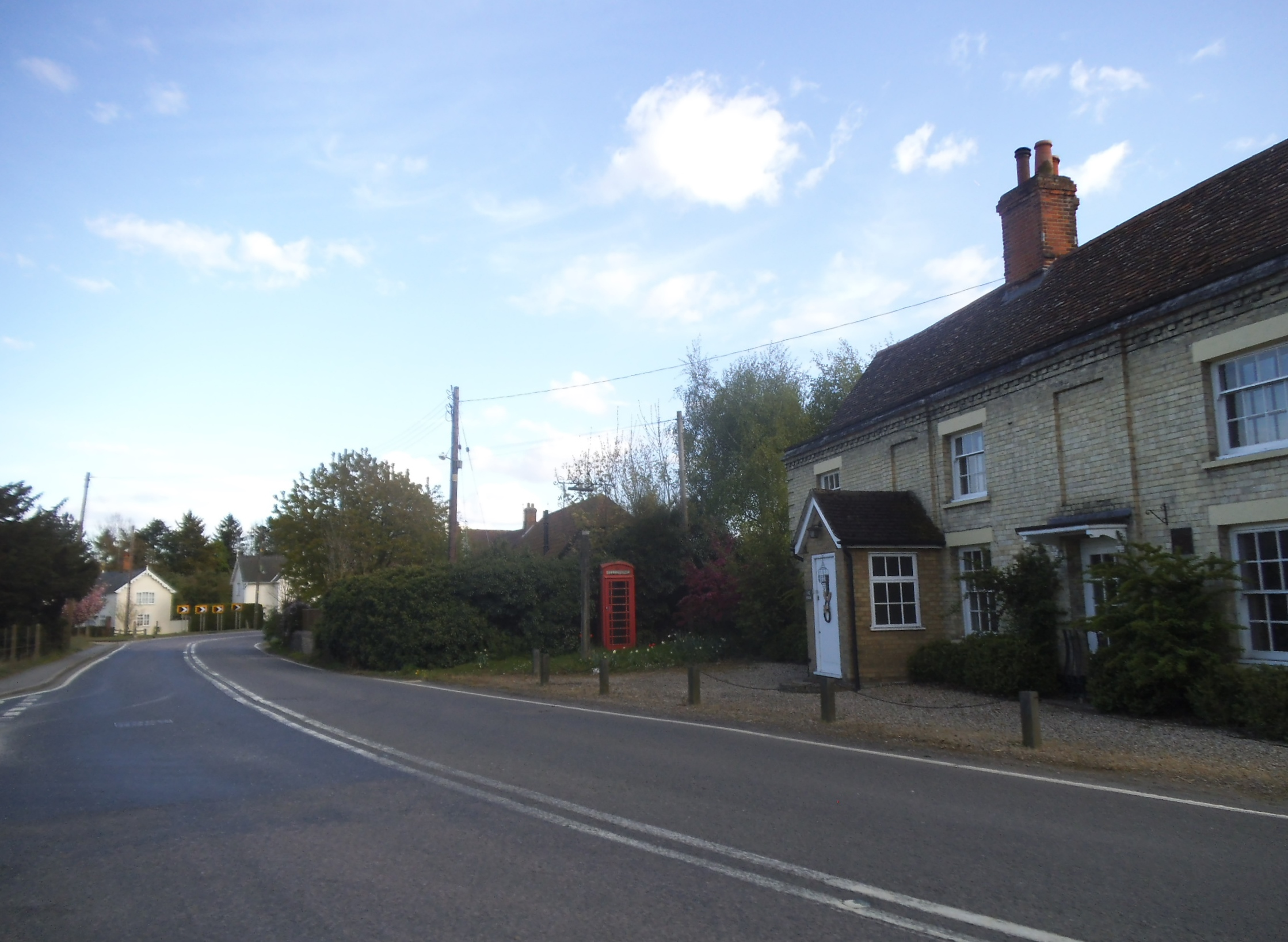

- Location within Essex
- OS grid reference: TL724428
- Civil parish: Birdbrook
- District: Braintree
- Shire county: Essex
- Region: East
- Country: England
- Sovereign state: United Kingdom
- Post town: Halstead
- Postcode district: CO9
- Dialling code: 01440
- Police: Essex
- Fire: Essex
- Ambulance: East of England
- UK Parliament: Braintree

Baythorne End is a hamlet in the English county of Essex, England. It is located directly on the border with Suffolk. The hamlet is within the civil parish of Birdbrook and forms a part of the Braintree parliamentary seat. Immediate neighbouring villages include: Ridgewell, Sturmer, Stoke-by-Clare and Wixoe.

Notable buildings include Baythorne Mill, Baythorne Hall, which dates from 1341 and the mansion and estate at Baythorne Park. Baythorne Hall is an early manor house of exceptionally high quality and exceptionally good state of survival, one of the earliest known examples of the hall house with contemporary jettied crosswings, which later was to become a common form.

The estate was purchased by George Pyke in 1640, where he built the Baythorne Park mansion some 28 years later. The mansion was somewhat larger than Baythorne Hall. Baythorne Park continued to be owned by the Pyke family for well over 200 years.
