= Listed buildings in Stisted =

Civil Parish in Essex, England

Stisted is a village and civil parish in the Braintree District of Essex, England. It contains 60 listed buildings that are recorded in the National Heritage List for England. Of these one is grade I, three are grade II* and 56 are grade II.

This list is based on the information retrieved online from Historic England.

== Key ==
| Grade | Criteria |
|---|---|
| I | Buildings that are of exceptional interest |
| II* | Particularly important buildings of more than special interest |
| II | Buildings that are of special interest |

== Listing ==
| Name | Grade | Location | Type | Completed (Note: The date given is the date used by Historic England as significant for the initial building or that of an important part in the structure's description.) | Date designated | Grid ref. (Note: The grid reference is based on the British national grid reference system, sometimes known as OSGB36, used by the Ordnance Survey.) Geo-coordinates | Notes | Entry number (Note: The "List Entry Number" is a unique number assigned to each listed building and scheduled monument by Historic England.) | Image | Wikidata |
|---|---|---|---|---|---|---|---|---|---|---|
| Barn 30 Meters South West of Woolmergreen Farmhouse | II | | | | 6 September 1988 | TL7865025617; 51°54′02″N 0°35′43″E | | 1123900 | Upload Photo | Q26416986 |
| Church Farmhouse | II | | | | 6 September 1988 | TL7955826489; 51°54′29″N 0°36′32″E | | 1305795 | Upload Photo | Q26592628 |
| Kentishes Farmhouse | II* | | | | 2 May 1953 | TL7911926235; 51°54′21″N 0°36′09″E | | 1123898 | Upload Photo | Q17557472 |
| Pair of Gateposts 35 Metres West South West of Stable Range of Stisted Hall | II | | | | 6 September 1988 | TL7943524739; 51°53′32″N 0°36′22″E | | 1123899 | Upload Photo | Q26416984 |
| Stisted Hall | II* | | | | 6 September 1988 | TL7951224667; 51°53′30″N 0°36′26″E | | 1170996 | Upload Photo | Q17557657 |
| Wall of Pond in Middle of Walled in Garden 120 Metres East of Stisted House | II | | | | 6 September 1988 | TL7966524682; 51°53′30″N 0°36′34″E | | 1337563 | Upload Photo | Q26621969 |
| Wall of Walled in Garden 120 Metres East of Stisted Hall | II | | | | 6 September 1988 | TL7966024653; 51°53′29″N 0°36′34″E | | 1171025 | Upload Photo | Q26464754 |
| Barn of Kentishes Farm | II | 50 Metres East Of Kentishes Farmhouse | | | 6 September 1988 | TL7913526233; 51°54′21″N 0°36′10″E | | 1170992 | Upload Photo | Q26464709 |
| Stable Range of Stisted Hall, and Walls Enclosing Yard to South | II | | | | 6 September 1988 | TL7949824753; 51°53′33″N 0°36′26″E | | 1337562 | Upload Photo | Q26621968 |
| Baytree Farmhouse | II* | Coggeshall Road | | | 2 May 1953 | TL7916223354; 51°52′48″N 0°36′06″E | | 1171048 | Upload Photo | Q17557662 |
| Hunter's Roost | II | Coggeshall Road | | | 6 September 1988 | TL7964423360; 51°52′48″N 0°36′31″E | | 1123901 | Upload Photo | Q26416988 |
| The Dolphin Public House | II | Coggeshall Road | pub | | 6 September 1988 | TL7952823363; 51°52′48″N 0°36′25″E | | 1305782 | The Dolphin Public House More images | Q26592615 |
| Pair of Gateposts 3.84 and 8.08 Metres Respectively South East of No 6, Covenbrook Cottages | II | Covenbrook Cottages, Kings Lane | | | 6 September 1988 | TL7927624884; 51°53′37″N 0°36′14″E | | 1337564 | Upload Photo | Q26621970 |
| North Lodge and Attached Gateway, Gates and Railings on Dwarf Walls | II | Gates And Railings On Dwarf Walls, Kings Lane | | | 6 September 1988 | TL7982924950; 51°53′39″N 0°36′43″E | | 1337565 | Upload Photo | Q26621971 |
| Barn Approximately 10 Metres to North of Jenkin's Farm | II | King's Lane | | | 16 August 1990 | TL7864023964; 51°53′08″N 0°35′39″E | | 1234250 | Upload Photo | Q26527669 |
| Barn Approximately 5 Metres to North East of Jenkin's Farm | II | King's Lane | | | 16 August 1990 | TL7865423943; 51°53′08″N 0°35′40″E | | 1123878 | Upload Photo | Q26416964 |
| Cart Lodge/granary at Jenkins Farm | II | King's Lane | | | 16 August 1990 | TL7860123940; 51°53′07″N 0°35′37″E | | 1234243 | Upload Photo | Q26527662 |
| Jenkin's Farmhouse | II | King's Lane | | | 6 September 1988 | TL7863523917; 51°53′07″N 0°35′39″E | | 1123903 | Upload Photo | Q26416990 |
| Overflow Sluice 160 Metres North West of Stisted Mill | II | King's Lane | | | 6 September 1988 | TL7903424611; 51°53′29″N 0°36′01″E | | 1123902 | Upload Photo | Q26416989 |
| Stisted Mill | II | King's Lane | | | 21 December 1967 | TL7912924484; 51°53′24″N 0°36′06″E | | 1171075 | Upload Photo | Q26464839 |
| Gatepost and Wicket Gate at South West Entrance to Stisted Hall Park | II | Kings Lane | | | 6 September 1988 | TL7923324555; 51°53′27″N 0°36′12″E | | 1171117 | Upload Photo | Q26464927 |
| Clematis Cottage | II | 77, Madgements Road | | | 6 September 1988 | TL7999225670; 51°54′02″N 0°36′53″E | | 1171128 | Upload Photo | Q26464950 |
| Moat Farmhouse | II | Moat Road | | | 30 September 1985 | TL8079627215; 51°54′51″N 0°37′38″E | | 1305714 | Upload Photo | Q26592557 |
| Mott Cottage | II | Moat Road | | | 6 September 1988 | TL8063226752; 51°54′36″N 0°37′29″E | | 1123904 | Upload Photo | Q26416991 |
| Baines Farm Cottages | II | 1 and 2, Prior's Green | | | 6 September 1988 | TL8046025737; 51°54′03″N 0°37′18″E | | 1337566 | Upload Photo | Q26621972 |
| Boultwood's Farmhouse | II | Rayne Hatch | | | 6 September 1988 | TL7890527095; 51°54′49″N 0°35′59″E | | 1305727 | Upload Photo | Q26592567 |
| Rayne Hatch Cottage | II | Rayne Hatch | | | 6 September 1988 | TL7905927226; 51°54′53″N 0°36′07″E | | 1123905 | Upload Photo | Q26416992 |
| Rayne Hatch Farmhouse | II | Rayne Hatch | | | 6 September 1988 | TL7899327257; 51°54′54″N 0°36′04″E | | 1171162 | Upload Photo | Q26464994 |
| Glebe House | II | Rectory Road | | | 6 September 1988 | TL7976225446; 51°53′55″N 0°36′41″E | | 1171201 | Upload Photo | Q26465040 |
| 66, Rectory Road | II | 66, Rectory Road | | | 6 September 1988 | TL7985425460; 51°53′55″N 0°36′46″E | | 1337567 | Upload Photo | Q26621973 |
| Icehouse 10 Meters North West of Gardener's Cottage, Stisted Hall Park | II | Stisted Hall Park | | | 6 September 1988 | TL7970624725; 51°53′32″N 0°36′37″E | | 1171031 | Upload Photo | Q26464767 |
| Old Tan | II | Tan Office | | | 2 May 1953 | TL8053825208; 51°53′46″N 0°37′21″E | | 1305625 | Upload Photo | Q26592474 |
| Tan Cottage | II | Tan Office | | | 6 September 1988 | TL8051025166; 51°53′45″N 0°37′19″E | | 1123875 | Upload Photo | Q26416961 |
| Pickstone's Cottages | II | 1 and 2, Tan Office | | | 6 September 1988 | TL8060325230; 51°53′47″N 0°37′24″E | | 1171391 | Upload Photo | Q26465343 |
| No 20, and Attached Railings and Gate | II | The Street | | | 6 September 1988 | TL8001524798; 51°53′34″N 0°36′53″E | | 1123871 | Upload Photo | Q26416957 |
| Flints | II | The Street | | | 6 September 1988 | TL7993824922; 51°53′38″N 0°36′49″E | | 1171214 | Upload Photo | Q26465055 |
| K6 Telephone Kiosk | II | The Street | | | 1 March 1994 | TL7996524668; 51°53′29″N 0°36′50″E | | 1234268 | Upload Photo | Q26527686 |
| Parish Church of All Saints | I | The Street | church building | | 21 December 1967 | TL7987324601; 51°53′27″N 0°36′45″E | | 1123870 | Parish Church of All Saints More images | Q17535956 |
| Pump Against North East Wall of Bakehouse One Metre North East of No 54 | II | The Street | | | 6 September 1988 | TL7998824902; 51°53′37″N 0°36′52″E | | 1337588 | Upload Photo | Q26621992 |
| Rufus Leo | II | The Street | | | 6 September 1988 | TL7999624739; 51°53′32″N 0°36′52″E | | 1337586 | Upload Photo | Q26621990 |
| Seven Winds | II | 12, The Street | | | 23 February 1981 | TL7998724856; 51°53′35″N 0°36′51″E | | 1123906 | Upload Photo | Q26416993 |
| 16, the Street | II | 16, The Street | | | 6 September 1988 | TL8003324817; 51°53′34″N 0°36′54″E | | 1171294 | Upload Photo | Q26465194 |
| The Montefiore Institute | II | 17, The Street | | | 6 September 1988 | TL8002524808; 51°53′34″N 0°36′53″E | | 1337585 | Upload Photo | Q26621989 |
| 18 and 19, the Street | II | 18 and 19, The Street | | | 6 September 1988 | TL8002024805; 51°53′34″N 0°36′53″E | | 1171307 | Upload Photo | Q26465212 |
| Peverel Cottage | II | 21, The Street | | | 6 September 1988 | TL8001524788; 51°53′33″N 0°36′53″E | | 1171318 | Upload Photo | Q26465229 |
| 22, the Street | II | 22, The Street | | | 6 September 1988 | TL8003024770; 51°53′33″N 0°36′54″E | | 1123872 | Upload Photo | Q26416958 |
| 23 and 24, the Street | II | 23 and 24, The Street | | | 6 September 1988 | TL7996724784; 51°53′33″N 0°36′50″E | | 1305712 | Upload Photo | Q26592555 |
| 25-28, the Street | II | 25-28, The Street | | | 6 September 1988 | TL8000724757; 51°53′32″N 0°36′52″E | | 1171324 | Upload Photo | Q26465237 |
| Quest Cottage | II | 29, The Street | | | 6 September 1988 | TL7997824740; 51°53′32″N 0°36′51″E | | 1171338 | Upload Photo | Q26465256 |
| 32 and 33, the Street | II | 32 and 33, The Street | | | 6 September 1988 | TL7999424713; 51°53′31″N 0°36′52″E | | 1123873 | Upload Photo | Q26416959 |
| Rosemary Cottage | II | 34 and 35, The Street | | | 6 September 1988 | TL7999224702; 51°53′30″N 0°36′51″E | | 1337587 | Upload Photo | Q26621991 |
| The Gables | II | 36, The Street | | | 6 September 1988 | TL7998624688; 51°53′30″N 0°36′51″E | | 1171355 | Upload Photo | Q26465284 |
| 41-46, the Street | II | 41-46, The Street | | | 6 September 1988 | TL7999224674; 51°53′30″N 0°36′51″E | | 1123874 | Upload Photo | Q26416960 |
| 53 and 54, the Street | II | 53 and 54, The Street | | | 6 September 1988 | TL7999624874; 51°53′36″N 0°36′52″E | | 1305619 | Upload Photo | Q26592468 |
| Barn 35 Meters South West of Gower's Farmhouse | II | Tumbler's Green | | | 6 September 1988 | TL8071325615; 51°53′59″N 0°37′31″E | | 1123877 | Upload Photo | Q26416963 |
| Brookes Farmhouse | II | Tumbler's Green | | | 23 June 1986 | TL8130726118; 51°54′15″N 0°38′03″E | | 1123876 | Upload Photo | Q26416962 |
| Brookslyn and Brooks View | II | Tumbler's Green | | | 29 September 1987 | TL8117025933; 51°54′09″N 0°37′55″E | | 1337589 | Upload Photo | Q26621993 |
| Granary 25 Metres North of Brookes Farmhouse | II | Tumbler's Green | | | 23 June 1986 | TL8131026154; 51°54′16″N 0°38′03″E | | 1305599 | Upload Photo | Q26592449 |
| Maltings 60 Metres South of Gower's Farmhouse | II | Tumbler's Green ' | | | 6 September 1988 | TL8075625583; 51°53′58″N 0°37′33″E | | 1171412 | Upload Photo | Q26465376 |
| 109, Water Lane | II | 109, Water Lane | | | 6 September 1988 | TL8006824169; 51°53′13″N 0°36′54″E | | 1337590 | Upload Photo | Q26621994 |

== See also ==
- Grade I listed buildings in Essex
- Grade II* listed buildings in Essex

== Sources ==
- Bettley, James; Pevsner, Nikolaus (2007) [1954], Essex, The Buildings of England, New Haven and London: Yale University Press, ISBN 978-0-300-11614-4
