= A131 road =

Road in Essex, England

A131

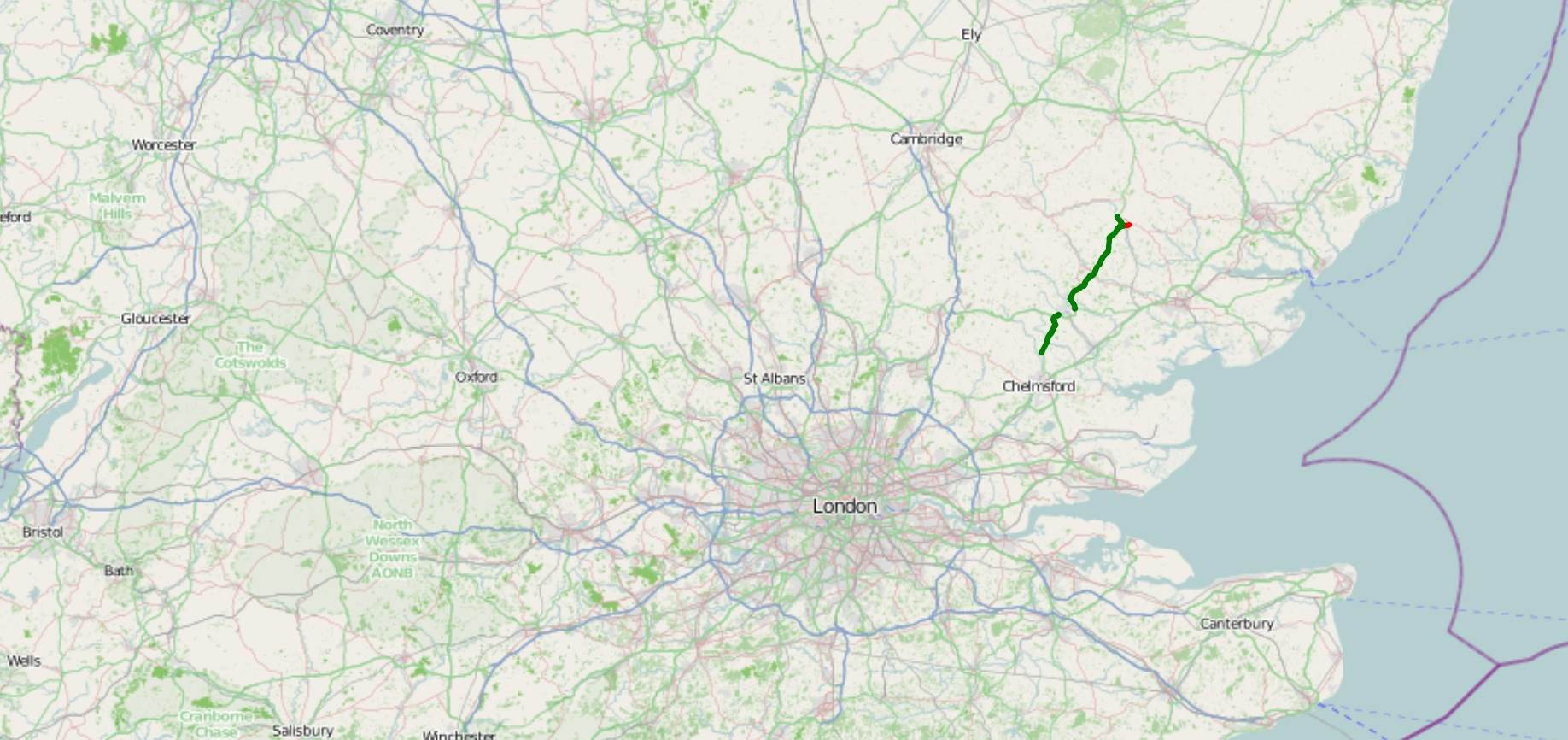
- Click map to enlarge

Route information
- Length: 32 mi (51 km)

Major junctions
- South end: A12 near Boreham, Essex
- A120 A1017 A1124

- North end: A134 in Sudbury, Suffolk

Location
- Country: United Kingdom
- Primary destinations: Sudbury, Halstead, Braintree, Chelmsford

Road network
- Roads in the United Kingdom; Motorways; A and B road zones

The A131 road is an A-road in England running from the Boreham Interchange near Chelmsford in Essex to Sudbury in Suffolk

== Route ==
It runs from the A12 (Boreham interchange J19) to the A134 road at Sudbury. The A131 runs north from Boreham interchange along Beaulieu Parkway then west along Channels Drive, then north again along Essex Regiment Way (formerly A130). It then takes its current route near Little Waltham. The A131 road by-passes Great Leighs, Young's End, Great Notley, then goes through the A120 road as the Braintree by-pass. It then meets the B1053 road (at the north end of the Braintree by-pass), goes through High Garrett, where it meets the A1017 road (coming off to the left) and Halstead (where it crosses the A1124 road).
