= List of settlements in Essex by population =

The 28 largest settlements of Essex, district centres in yellow, county town and city in bold.

This is a list of settlements in Essex by population based on the results of the 2011 census. The next United Kingdom census will take place in 2021. In 2011, there were 44 built-up area subdivisions with 5,000 or more inhabitants in Essex, shown in the table below.

== Population ranking ==
#	Settlement	Population		Borough/District
#	Settlement	2001	2011	Borough/District
1	Southend-on-Sea	162,050	175,547	Southend-on-Sea
2	Colchester	105,130	119,441	Colchester
3	Chelmsford	100,660	110,507	Chelmsford
4	Basildon	100,950	107,123	Basildon
5	Rayleigh/South Benfleet/Thundersley	92,040	95,580	Rochford
6	Harlow	78,890	82,059	Harlow
7	Grays	54,820	66,843	Thurrock
8	Brentwood	47,920	52,586	Brentwood
9	Clacton-on-Sea	51,284	50,548	Tendring
10	Braintree	35,620	41,634	Braintree
11	Canvey Island	37,480	38,170	Castle Point
12	Billericay	33,674	34,274	Basildon
13	Wickford	31,480	33,486	Basildon
14	Loughton	30,340	31,106	Epping Forest
15	Stanford-le-Hope	30,102	28,725	Thurrock
16	Witham	22,470	25,353	Braintree
17	Maldon	20,731	21,462	Maldon
18	Harwich	19,260	19,738	Tendring
19	South Ockendon	17,670	19,460	Thurrock
20	Waltham Abbey	17,940	18,743	Epping Forest
21	Rochford	16,220	17,739	Rochford
22	South Woodham Ferrers	16,630	16,453	Chelmsford
23	Saffron Walden	14,310	15,210	Uttlesford
24	Tilbury	11,462	12,450	Thurrock
25	Walton-on-the-Naze	11,993	12,054	Tendring
26	Halstead	11,053	11,906	Braintree
27	Chigwell	9,931	10,365	Epping Forest
28	Epping	9,890	10,289	Epping Forest
29	Chadwell St Mary	9,463	9,864	Thurrock
30	Tiptree	8,300	9,182	Colchester
31	Brightlingsea	8,146	8,076	Tendring
32	Aveley	7,486	7,986	Thurrock
33	Great Dunmow	5,940	7,749	Uttlesford
34	Great Notley	5,660	7,749	Braintree
35	Wivenhoe	7,220	7,637	Colchester
36	West Mersea	6,792	7,057	Colchester
37	Burnham-on-Crouch	6,973	6,905	Maldon
38	Danbury	6,560	6,673	Chelmsford
39	Stansted Mountfitchet	5,860	6,669	Uttlesford
40	Hullbridge	6,050	6,097	Rochford
41	Chipping Ongar	5,923	6,093	Epping Forest
42	Manningtree	5,720	5,696	Tendring
43	Great Wakering	5,248	5,400	Rochford
44	Ingatestone	4,975	5,365	Brentwood
45	Writtle	5,011	4,840	Chelmsford
46	Jaywick	4,665	4,799	Tendring
47	Coggeshall	4,327	4,727	Braintree
48	Kelvedon	4,593	4,717	Braintree
49	Frinton-on-Sea	4,814	4,687	Tendring
50	East Tilbury	4,726	4,622	Thurrock
