= Moot Hall, Steeple Bumpstead =

Municipal building in Steeple Bumpstead, England

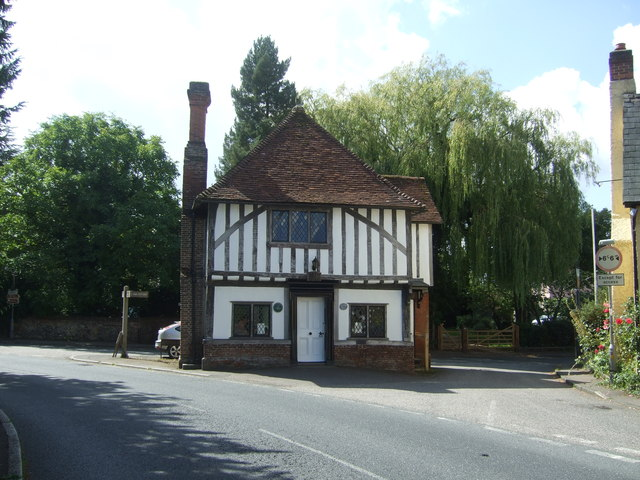
- Moot Hall, Steeple Bumpstead

- Shown in Essex
- 52.0424°N 0.4484°E
- Location: Church Street, Steeple Bumpstead

History
- Built: 1592

Site notes
- Architectural style: Tudor style

Listed Building – Grade II*
- Official name: The Moot Hall
- Designated: 7 August 1952
- Reference no.: 1146551

The Moot Hall, also known as the Old School House, is a former market hall and school on Church Street in Steeple Bumpstead, Essex, England. The building, which now operates as a library and parish meeting room, is a Grade II* listed building.

== History ==
The building was commissioned as a market hall by the wealthy villagers of Steeple Bumpstead in the late 16th century. It was designed in the Tudor style using timber frame construction, and was completed in 1592. The design involved a broadly symmetrical main frontage of three bays facing northeast down Chapel Street. The first floor involved extensive use of jettied timber framing allowing the creation of extra space for the meeting room on that floor. The ground floor was originally open but it was enclosed in the 18th century. On the first floor, there was a prominent tri-partite casement window. On the northwest side, there was an external staircase which was also encased in the 18th century. At roof level there is a hip roof surmounted, at the apex, by a statue of a lion holding a shield with the Royal coat of Arms of the Tudor monarchs.

In the 19th century, the building was at the centre of a dispute between the lord of the manor, George Gent, whose seat was at Moyns Park, and the villagers as to whether it was the right of the lord of the manor or the right of the villagers to appoint the headmaster of the local school which was based in the building. The matter was eventually passed to an ecclesiastical court which ruled in favour of the villagers. The building ceased to function as a school in 1848 when the new national school was completed in Church Street. The moot hall was subsequently used as a library and a meeting place for Steeple Bumpstead Parish Council.

A war memorial, in the form of a simple cross, intended to commemorate the lives of local service personnel who had died in the First World War, was erected just behind the moot hall and unveiled by Colonel Joseph Griffiths, on 12 December 1920. Griffiths was a surgeon who had commanded the 1st Eastern General Hospital in Cambridge during the war. In 1986, a plaque was attach to the moot hall to commemorate the passing of 900 years since Steeple Bumpstead was mentioned in the Domesday Book.

== See also ==
- Grade II* listed buildings in Braintree (district)
