= Ugley =

Village in Essex, England

Coordinates: 51.9342°N 0.2103°E

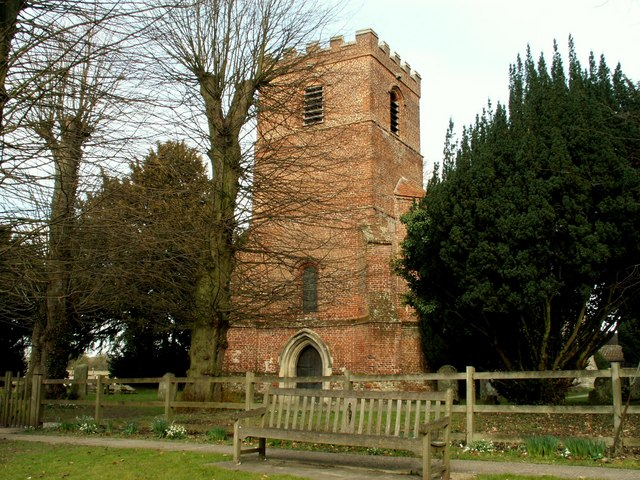
- St Peter's Church, Ugley

- Location within Essex
- Population: 468 (Parish, 2021)
- OS grid reference: TL520284
  - London: 30 mi (48 km) S
- Civil parish: Ugley
- District: Uttlesford
- Shire county: Essex
- Region: East
- Country: England
- Sovereign state: United Kingdom
- Post town: BISHOP'S STORTFORD
- Postcode district: CM22
- Dialling code: 01279
- Police: Essex
- Fire: Essex
- Ambulance: East of England
- UK Parliament: Saffron Walden

Ugley is a village and civil parish in Uttlesford district of Essex, England. It is about 2 miles (3 km) north of Stansted Mountfitchet, and situated between Saffron Walden and Bishop's Stortford. Within the parish is the village of Ugley Green, 1.5 miles (2.4 km) to the south of Ugley itself. At the 2021 census the parish had a population of 468.

Ugley was first recorded in 1041 as "Uggele". It appears in the Domesday Book of 1086 as "Ugghelea", in the ancient hundred of Claverling. The name probably means "woodland clearing of a man named Ugga." Within Ugley there are several buildings of the 16th and 17th centuries. The Grade II* listed church, St Peter's, has a 13th-century nave and a Tudor brick tower. Orford House is a Grade II* listed building built by Edward Russell, 1st Earl of Orford, c.1700.

The village's name has been noted on lists of unusual place names. Ugley has been described as "very pretty" and "a very scenic part of Essex". A local noted the nearby village of Nasty and recalled a local headline once declared that an Ugley woman had married a Nasty man.

== Cycling ==
There is a cycling time trial course which starts close to Ugley. The village is home to several bungalows or "huts" owned by long-established cycling clubs based in Essex and Greater London.

== See also ==
- Clavering hundred
- The Hundred Parishes
- List of places in Essex
- Rude Britain
