= Young's End =

Hamlet in Essex, England

Coordinates: 51.846963°N 0.525678°E

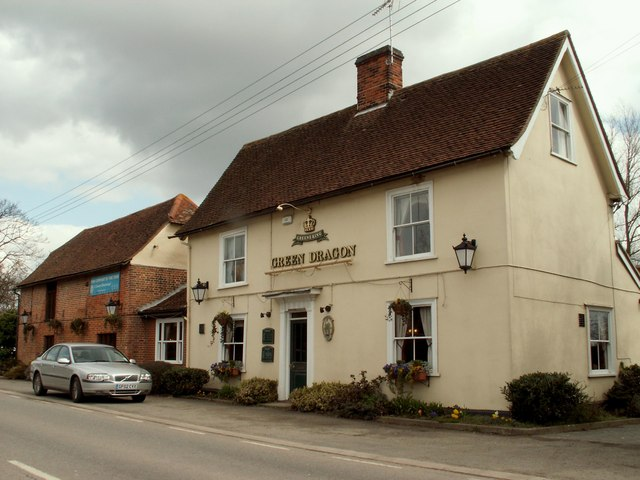
- Green Dragon

- Location within Essex
- OS grid reference: TL739195
- Shire county: Essex
- Region: East
- Country: England
- Sovereign state: United Kingdom
- Post town: Braintree
- Postcode district: CM77 8
- Dialling code: 01245
- Police: Essex
- Fire: Essex
- Ambulance: East of England
- UK Parliament: Braintree

Young's End is a hamlet in Essex, England. The population of the hamlet is included in the civil parish of Black Notley.

It is located along the former A131 road between Great Notley and Great Leighs.
