= Baythorne Hall =

English country house

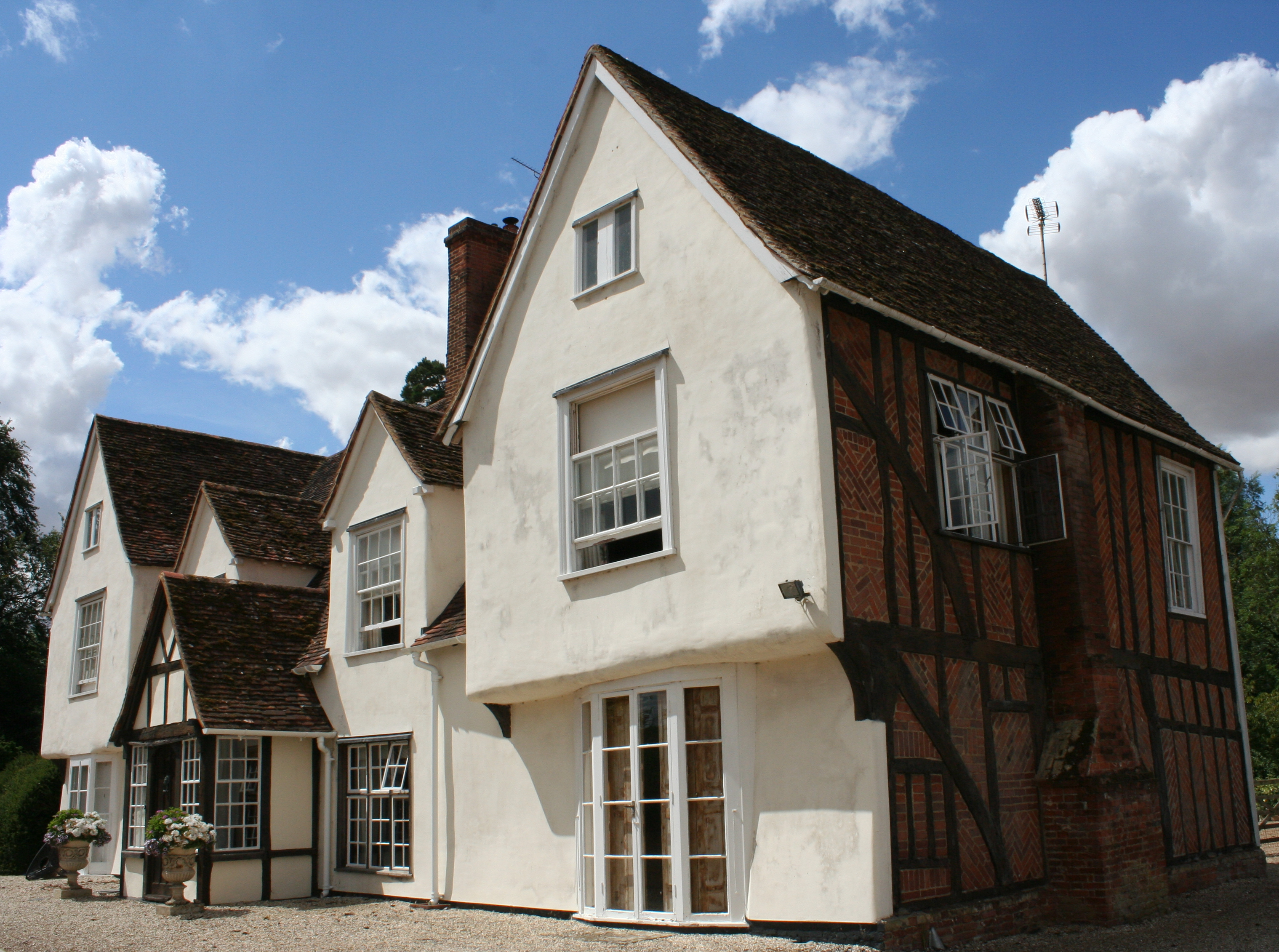

General information
- Location: Birdbrook, Essex, England, United Kingdom
- Coordinates: 52°3′20.16″N 0°30′23.36″E
- Year built: c. 1341/42

Baythorne Hall is a raised-aisle hall in Baythorne End, Essex. It has been a Grade I listed building since 1952.

== History ==
Baythorne Hall is an early example of a raised-aisle hall, of a type that is rare in Essex common in neighbouring Suffolk. It is one of three such buildings to have undergone dendrochronological dating (the others being Lodge Farm, Norfolk, and Wymondley Bury, Hertfordshire), and the oldest of the three, dated to 1341 or 1342. This would make the hall the work of Sir John de Walton, who held the manor at the time, and was also responsible for the construction of Tiptofts in nearby Wimbish.

The original building consisted of a 2-bay hall, south-east facing, with two jettied crosswings. In the 16th century, a brick chimney was added to the building, and the hall was floored over. An extension was built to the rear of the building in the late 19th or early 20th century, and new windows were added at various times between the 18th and 20th centuries.

== Present day ==
Baythorne Hall has been described by Heritage England as being "exceptionally" well-preserved. Since the 1870s, the building has been in the private ownership of the Unwin family, who run a farm on the site.

One former farm building at Baythorne Hall today hosts a "rural independent business hub", hosting a number of local businesses including a bakery, Morgan’s butchery, wine shop, and café.
