= Wenden Lofts =

Civil parish in Essex, England

Coordinates: 52°1′1″N 0°7′20″E

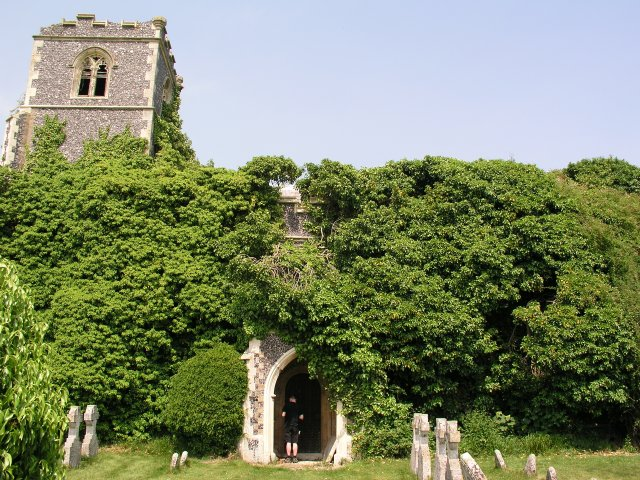
- The former parish church of St Dunstan, now in ruins

- Location within Essex
- Population: 63 (Parish, 2021)
  - London: 50 mi (80 km) SE
- Civil parish: Wenden Lofts
- District: Uttlesford
- Shire county: Essex
- Region: East
- Country: England
- Sovereign state: United Kingdom
- Post town: Saffron Walden
- Postcode district: CB11
- Dialling code: 01763
- Police: Essex
- Fire: Essex
- Ambulance: East of England
- UK Parliament: Saffron Walden

Wenden Lofts is a civil parish in the Uttlesford district of Essex, England. The main settlement in the parish is the hamlet of Lower Pond Street. At the 2021 census the parish had a population of 63.

The parish church, dedicated to St Dunstan, was completely rebuilt in 1845–6, replacing a 12th-century building. The ecclesiastical parish was united with neighbouring Elmdon in 1931. Since then, St Dunstan's Church has become a ruin.

Wendon Lofts and Elmdon remain separate civil parishes, but they do now share a grouped parish council, called the Elmdon, Duddenhoe End and Wenden Lofts Parish Council.
