= Elmdon =

Village in Essex, England

Coordinates: 52.03456°N 0.13429°E

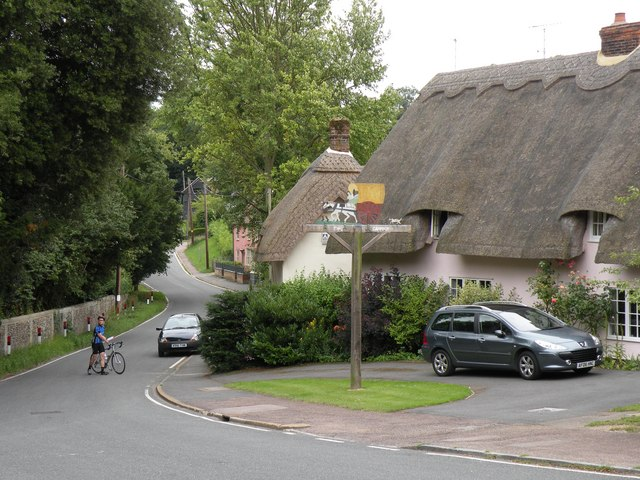
- Elmdon village

- Location within Essex
- Population: 549 (Parish, 2021)
- OS grid reference: TL465395
- District: Uttlesford
- Shire county: Essex
- Region: East
- Country: England
- Sovereign state: United Kingdom
- Post town: SAFFRON WALDEN
- Postcode district: CB11
- Dialling code: 01763
- Police: Essex
- Fire: Essex
- Ambulance: East of England
- UK Parliament: North West Essex

See also, Elmdon, West Midlands.

Elmdon is a village and civil parish in the Uttlesford district of Essex, England. The village lies 5 miles (8 km) west of Saffron Walden, its post town, and near the county boundaries with Cambridgeshire and Hertfordshire. The hilly topography of the area differentiates it from countryside to the north, which is predominantly fenland and flat. As well as the village itself, the parish also includes the hamlet of Duddenhoe End. At the 2021 census the parish had a population of 549.

The parish shares a grouped parish council with the neighbouring parish of Wenden Lofts, called the Elmdon, Duddenhoe End and Wenden Lofts Parish Council.

== History ==
The castle motte at Elmdon, known as 'castle hill', still exists. It was the Norman fortification of Robert de Lucy, brother to Richard de Lucy, Justiciar to King Stephen and Henry II. The church at Elmdon was granted by Robert de Lucy to Lesnes Abbey (founded by Richard de Lucy), around 1180. One mile to the west, at the highest point in Essex, Eustace de Boulogne (d.1125), father of Matilda of Boulogne (c.1103-1152), the future wife of King Stephen, built and occupied his moated house named 'Flanders' at Chrishall.

Elmdon has two Grade II* listed buildings: the church, which was, apart from the 15th Century tower, rebuilt in 1852 and 1879, likely on old foundations; and Pigots, an early 1500s moated manor house, which was home to the Mead family from 1554 to 1770. The name Elmdon means 'hill of elms'. Elmdon includes a village hall, a church, and a recreation ground used for cricket and football.

== Transport ==
Elmdon has an infrequent bus service with links to Bishop's Stortford. There are three roads out of Elmdon; two are minor roads leading to other villages, and the third provides access indirectly to the nearest station, Audley End on the West Anglia Main Line.

== Leisure ==
Elmdon has sporting teams participating in local leagues. The village is a starting point for cross country running with trails of between 3 km and 30 km, some avoiding major roads. Tracks are passable on foot and bicycle between March and November, becoming waterlogged outside this range (passable but not to run on).

The Icknield Way Path passes through the village on its 180-kilometre (110-mile) journey from Ivinghoe Beacon in Buckinghamshire to Knettishall Heath in Suffolk. The multi-user route is open for walkers, horse riders and off-road cyclists.

== See also ==
- The Hundred Parishes
