= Steeple Bumpstead =

Village in England

Coordinates: 52.0445°N 0.4484°E

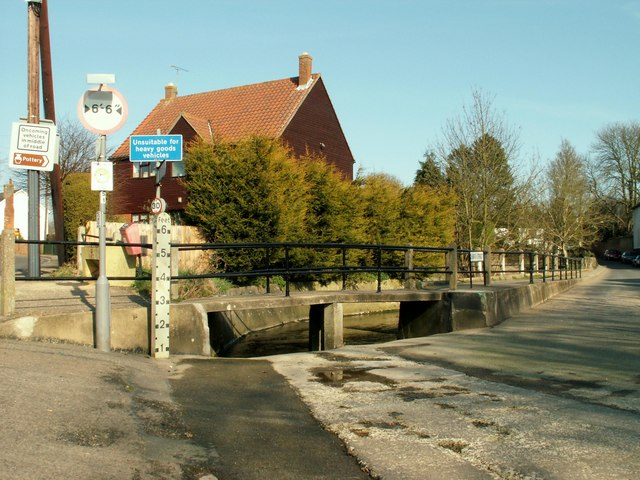
- The footbridge on the corner of Church Street, Steeple Bumpstead

- Location within Essex
- Population: 1,580 (Parish, 2021)
- OS grid reference: TL6841
- Civil parish: Steeple Bumpstead
- District: Braintree
- Shire county: Essex
- Region: East
- Country: England
- Sovereign state: United Kingdom
- Post town: HAVERHILL
- Postcode district: CB9
- Dialling code: 01440
- Police: Essex
- Fire: Essex
- Ambulance: East of England
- UK Parliament: Braintree

Steeple Bumpstead is a village and civil parish 3 miles (4.8 km) south of Haverhill in the Braintree district of Essex, England. At the 2021 census the parish had a population of 1,580.

The parish church does not have a steeple, although the Congregational Church has a small Victorian one. It is believed that the steeple referred to was located on the A1017 close to what is now the Wixoe Pumping Station.

Village features include a village hall, School (Steeple Bumpstead Primary school) and park.

== Etymology ==
The name Bumpstead, once referring to the whole area now known as Steeple and Helions Bumpstead, is first attested in a charter of 1042—albeit only in a copy of the mid-twelfth century—as Bumsted and Bumsteda; it next appears in the Domesday Book of 1086 (in the spellings Bumesteda, Bummesteda, and Bunsteda). The first element of the name is agreed probably to have been the Old English word bune, in this context meaning 'reeds' (though it could also mean 'flax' or 'hemp')—either because the settlement was named for the presence of reeds themselves, or because it was named after a river called Bune that had itself been named for its reeds. This interpretation fits the presence of a river characterised by reeds running through Steeple Bumpstead. The second element is thought either to have originated as Old English stede, meaning 'place', or hām-stede, meaning 'homestead'. Thus the name once meant something like 'reed-place' or 'homestead on the River Bune'.

In time, two distinct centres developed, with the Helions part taking on the name Bumpstead Magna (Great) and the Steeple district Bumpstead Parva (Little). The name of Steeple Bumpstead arises from the presence there of a church tower, first apparent in the appearance of the forms Stepilbumstede and Stepelbumstede in the period 1260–92, the French form Bomstede alatour ('Bumpstead at the tower') in 1284, and Bunsted(e) atte Tour in 1285.

== History ==
The Knights Templar positioned themselves on the river. The town is notable for its Lollard connections.

There has been a long history on non-conformist belief in the village which continues to this day in the Congregational Church. A Bumpstead man was burnt to death in the parish for his beliefs. Along the Blois Road, leading from Bumpstead to Birdbrook, is a field that has been called the 'Bloody Pightle', and that is where he is believed to have been martyred. In 1527 John Tibauld and eight other village residents were seized and taken before the Bishop of London, charged with meeting together in Bower Hall to pray and read a copy of the New Testament. Although the non-conformists in the village were encouraged by the powerful Bendyshe family that lived at Bower Hall, even their influence could not save Tibauld. He was burned at the stake.

Having fallen into ruin after use as a 'concentration camp' in the First World War, Bower Hall was finally demolished in 1926 and the materials sold off. The great staircase found its way to the United States.

The Moot Hall, also known as "the Old Schole", symbolises Steeple Bumpstead. Built in 1592 by the inhabitants on land rented from the Crown, in the 1830s when it was 'a school for farmers' sons' the villagers forcibly took possession of it, disputing the claim of George Gent of Moyns Park to have the right to appoint the headmaster. Eventually an ecclesiastical court upheld the villagers' claim.

== Modern times ==
The Shopping Basket - Bowtells - (Then High Street) Chapel Street around 1930

There are many facilities in Steeple Bumpstead for residents including a local village store, a petrol station, and a library in the aforementioned Moot Hall. There are two pubs, The Fox and Hounds and The Red Lion.

There are two churches, the Church of England parish church of St. Mary's and the Congregational Church, each offering various activities for all ages. St Mary's is a grade I listed building dating from the 11th century.

Steeple Bumpstead has a primary school, Steeple Bumpstead Primary School.

Steeple Bumpstead has a Scout Group: 1st Steeple Bumpstead Scouts which consists of a Beaver Colony, A Cub Pack and a Scout Troop.

Steeple Bumpstead was also mentioned in the first pages of the 2007 novel The Reavers by George MacDonald Fraser.

The village is referred to in Episode 5 of the first series of The Fall and Rise of Reginald Perrin broadcast on BBC1 (1976). Perrin tries to insult a colleague by saying that they are Lecturer in 'Applied Manure from The University of Steeple Bumpstead'.

== Notable residents ==
Nurse Edith Cavell had ties with Steeple Bumpstead long before she became a nurse. During 1886, Edith was appointed governess to the four children of the Reverend Charles Powell, vicar of Steeple Bumpstead. The former vicarage, where a stone plaque commemorates her stay, is a private residence on the corner of Chapel Street and Finchingfield Road. There is a plaque about Edith Cavell in the 11th century village church and a road named after her.

Colonel J. C. Humphrey, son of the village wheelwright, may have allegedly invented corrugated iron, but this is myth as it was invented by Henry Robinson Palmer in 1829. He built and lived in the Iron House, North Street, which was demolished in the 1960s. At one time Humphreys Ltd of London claimed to be the 'largest works in the world' and held a Royal Warrant as 'supplier to His Majesty King Edward VII'.

== See also ==
- The Hundred Parishes
