= White Court =

Housing estate in Great Notley, Essex, England

Coordinates: 51.861°N 0.529°E

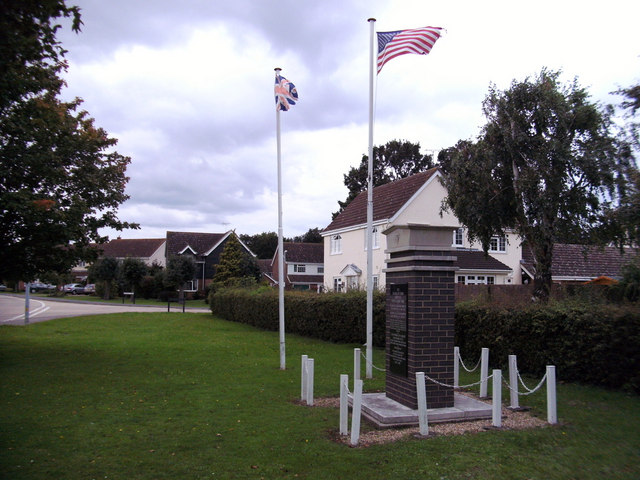
Memorial monument at the entrance to the White Court estate

White Court is a residential housing estate in the village of Great Notley, south west of Braintree, Essex, England, built on the site of the old Oaklands estate, which was used as an American army hospital during World War II. The estate also includes White Court Primary School.

== White Court ==
Plaque on the memorial monument

Now a residential housing estate of some 550 plus homes located to the south of Braintree town in Essex, England, it was formerly the 8th Army air force military hospital, built in the grounds of "White Court" which was previously a large detached house standing in its own grounds on London Road, originally known as "Oaklands".

It consisted largely of Nissen huts linked by sheltered walkways. Initially 750 beds then later increased to 834 following D-Day. On 6 June 1944 it was further expanded by the erection of tented wards.

To begin with, many of those treated were injured and sick U.S. airmen from the local airfields but following the invasion of Europe by the allies, specially equipped hospital trains loaded with injured soldiers began to arrive at Braintree station. 13 in total eventually received. On 19 April 1944 the hospital was bombed causing much damage but no one killed or seriously injured.

The Hospital closed on the 13 June 1945 and lay derelict for some years.

Standing at the entrance to the estate is a monument to the men and women who treated or were treated at the hospital.

== Monument Text ==
THE AMERICAN ARMY HOSPITAL WHITE COURT PARK U.S.ARMY 12TH EVACUATION HOSPITAL

29th APRIL 1943 - 11th JULY 1943
U.S.ARMY 121st STATION HOSPITAL 30th JUNE 1943 - 11th JUNE 1945
OPENED AS A 750 BED, LATER BECOMING A 1354-BED HOSPITAL. GIVING MEDICAL SERVICE TO 35 U.S. 8th AND 9th AIR FORCE UNITS. FOLLOWING D-DAY 6th JUNE 1944. THE MAJORITY OF ADMISSIONS WERE THE SOLDIER CASUALTIES FROM THE BATTLEFIELDS OF EUROPE.
THIS MEMORIAL IS IN HONOUR AND MEMORY OF THE OFFICERS - SURGEONS - NURSES - ENLISTED MEN HOSPITAL SERVICE GROUPS - AMERICAN RED CROSS
'SERVICE ABOVE SELF'
THIS MEMORIAL WAS DEDICATED ON THE 15th AUGUST 1992 TO CO-INCIDE WITH THE 50th ANNIVERSARY. U.S.A.A.F. IN EAST ANGLIA. 1942 - 1992
