= Ugley Green =

Village in Essex, England

Coordinates: 51.9219°N 0.2155°E

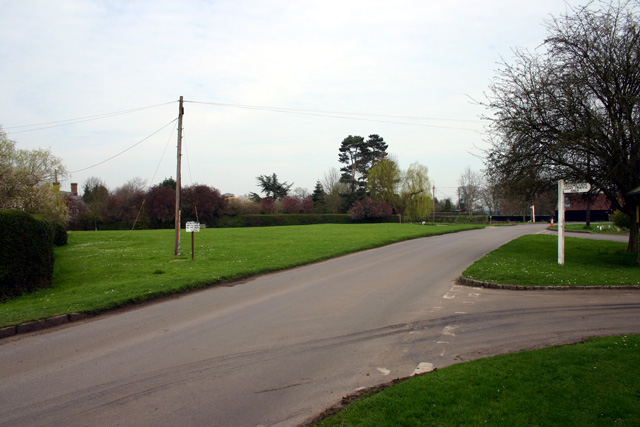
- Ugley Green

- Location within Essex
- OS grid reference: TL524271
  - London: 30 mi (48 km) S
- Civil parish: Ugley
- District: Uttlesford
- Shire county: Essex
- Region: East
- Country: England
- Sovereign state: United Kingdom
- Post town: BISHOP'S STORTFORD
- Postcode district: CM22
- Dialling code: 01279
- Police: Essex
- Fire: Essex
- Ambulance: East of England
- UK Parliament: Saffron Walden

Ugley Green is a small village in the district of Uttlesford in Essex, England. It is approximately 6 miles (10 km) north-east from Bishops Stortford, and just to the west of the M11 motorway. The village is within the civil parish of Ugley, a smaller settlement 1.5 miles (2.4 km) to the north.

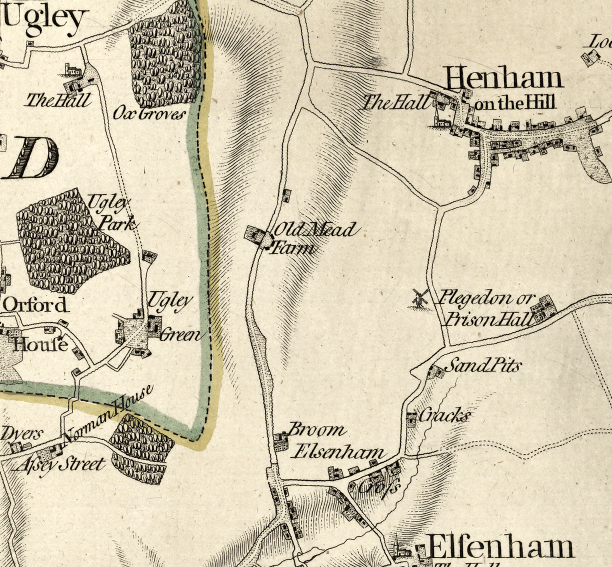
Chapman and André map of 1777 showing Ugley Green

The village contains two Grade II listed 19th-century houses, and a post-medieval house.

The village hall was built in 1920. Occupations in 1933 included four farmers, a carpenter, a stationer & sub-postmaster, a blacksmith, a gravel merchant, a beer retailer, a shopkeeper, a steward to Wades Hall, and the licensee of the White Hart public house. Wades Hall is the remaining wing of a larger house dating to the 16th century, Grade II listed, and approximately 1 mile (1.6 km) northwest from the village.

== See also ==
- Clavering hundred
- The Hundred Parishes
- Rude Britain
