= Tilbury Juxta Clare =

Village in Essex, England

Coordinates: 52.0345°N 0.5663°E

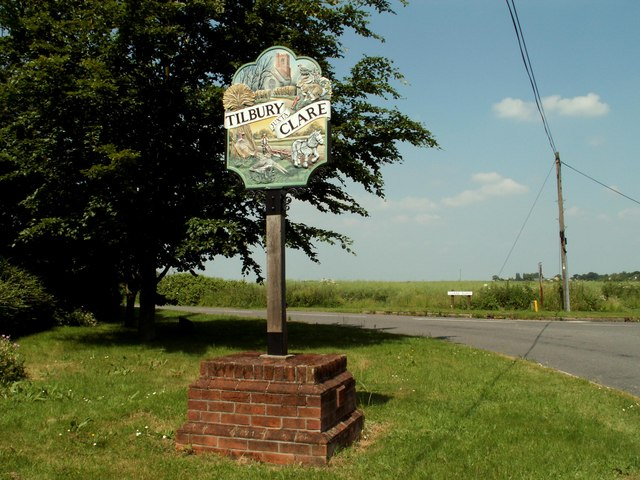
- Tilbury Juxta Clare village sign

- Location within Essex
- Population: 205 (2011 Census)
- OS grid reference: TL761404
- Civil parish: Tilbury Juxta Clare
- District: Braintree
- Shire county: Essex
- Region: East
- Country: England
- Sovereign state: United Kingdom
- Post town: HALSTEAD
- Postcode district: CO9
- Dialling code: 01787
- Police: Essex
- Fire: Essex
- Ambulance: East of England
- UK Parliament: Braintree

Tilbury Juxta Clare is a village and civil parish in the Braintree District of Essex, England, close to the northern boundary of the county with Suffolk. It lies 1 mile (1.6 km) north of the larger village of Great Yeldham and 7 miles (11 km) north of its post town of Halstead. At the 2021 census the parish had a population of 131.

== Toponymy ==
Tilbury likely means the burh (fortified place) of a person called Tila.

The name was anciently just Tilbury; the "juxta Clare" ("near Clare") was added to distinguish it from East Tilbury, West Tilbury and Tilbury which are all at the southern end of Essex on the banks of the River Thames. Clare is a small town about 3 miles (5 km) north of this Tilbury, just over the county boundary in Suffolk.

== History ==
Tilbury (without the "juxta Clare") appears in the Domesday Book of 1086 as a manor in the Hinckford hundred of Essex. It was then owned by Tihel of Helléan. He appears to have been one of the Normans who came over as part of the Norman Conquest. The Domesday Book does not record him as having owned any land in 1066, but he had 14 estates by 1086, many in the north Essex area, including Helions Bumpstead which takes the first part of its name from him.

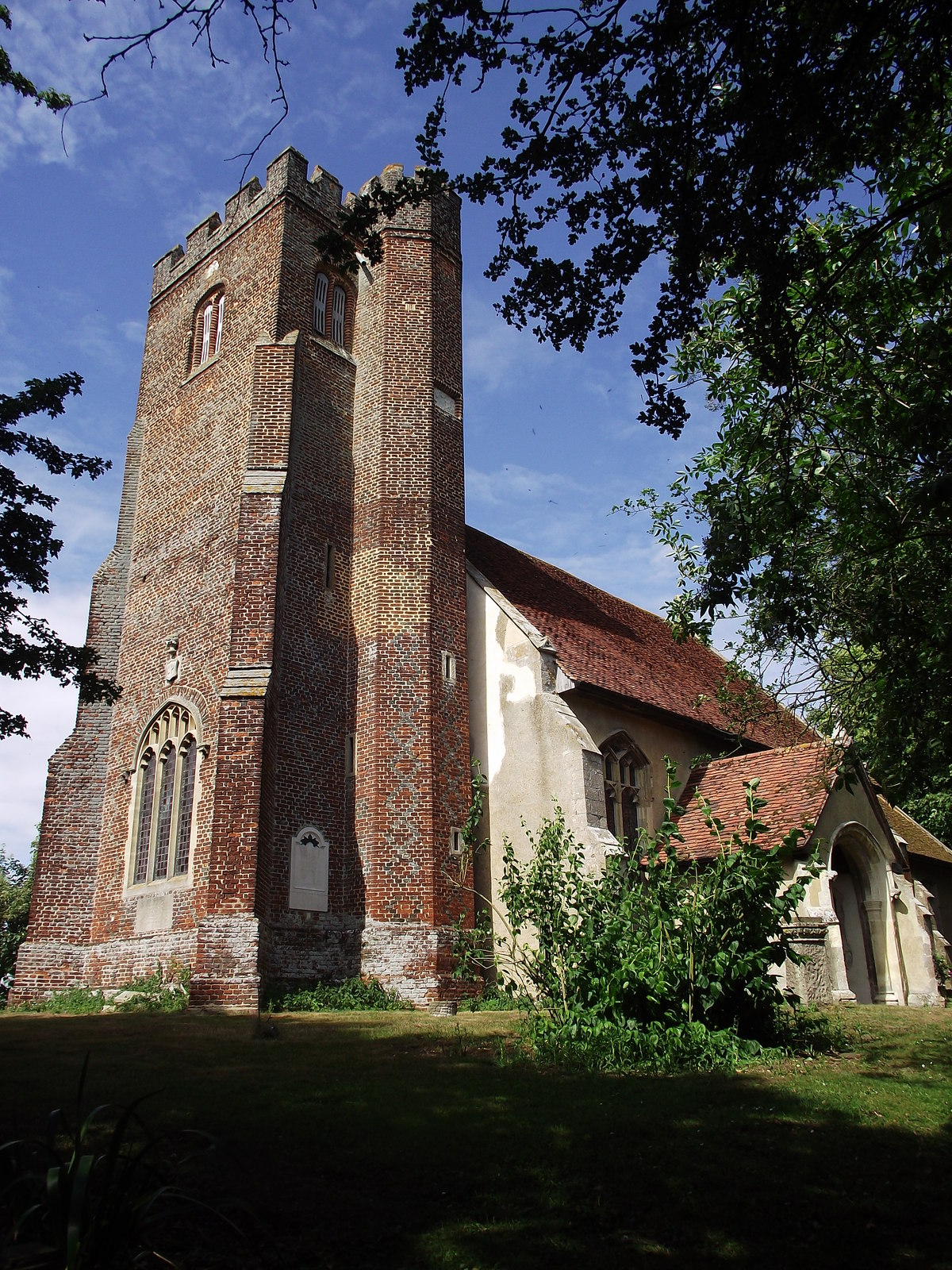
St Margaret's Church

No church of priest is mentioned at Tilbury in the Domesday Book, but it subsequently became a parish. The current parish church, dedicated to St Margaret, dates back to the 15th century. It is a Grade I listed building, noteworthy for remaining largely unchanged since it was built, unlike most churches its age which have been significantly altered and restored over time.
