= Duddenhoe End =

Village in Essex, England

Coordinates: 52.0122°N 0.1254°E

- Location within Essex
- OS grid reference: TL458370
- Shire county: Essex
- Region: East
- Country: England
- Sovereign state: United Kingdom
- Post town: SAFFRON WALDEN
- Postcode district: CB11
- Dialling code: 01763
- Police: Essex
- Fire: Essex
- Ambulance: East of England

Duddenhoe End is a village in the civil parish of Elmdon, in north-west Essex, England. It lies approximately midway between Royston and Saffron Walden, and is located near the villages of Langley, Essex and Arkesden.

== Governance ==
Duddenhoe End is part of the local government district of Uttlesford and lies within the Saffron Walden (UK Parliament constituency).

== Village amenities ==
The village has no shop, but it has a village hall, built in 1931, and a thatched church that was converted from a barn in the 19th century. The last public house in the village, "The Woodman", was converted into a private residence in the late 1990s.

The surrounding roads are narrow rural lanes, many of which are single-track with passing places.

Duddenhoe End did not have a mains sewerage system until 2005.
