= Bocking, Essex =

Area in the town of Braintree, Essex, England

Coordinates: 51.8833°N 0.5500°E

Bocking
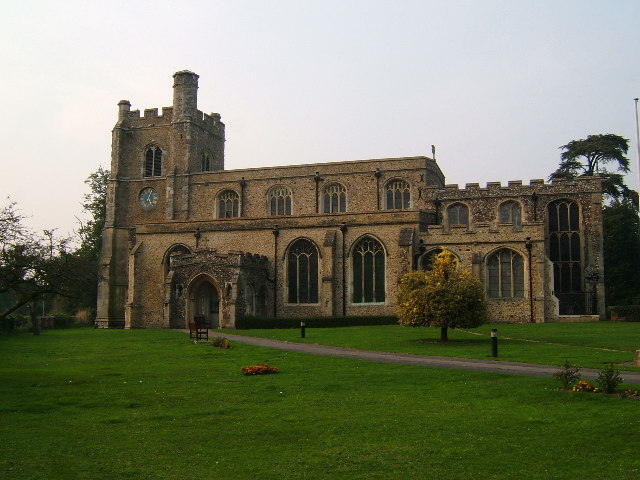
- St Mary's Church, Bocking Churchstreet

- Location within Essex
- District: Braintree
- Shire county: Essex
- Region: East
- Country: England
- Sovereign state: United Kingdom
- Post town: Braintree
- Postcode district: CM7

Bocking is a suburban village on the northern side of Braintree, in Essex, England.

Bocking village was historically in two parts; the original settlement around the parish church became known as Bocking Churchstreet, while a separate linear settlement called Bocking grew up a little way to the south along Bradford Street and The Causeway, adjoining the northern edge of Braintree. The parish of Bocking was abolished in 1934, merging with Braintree to become the urban district of Braintree and Bocking, which was in turn abolished in 1974 to become part of Braintree District. Both parts of Bocking now form part of the Braintree built up area.

Bocking forms an electoral division for Essex County Council elections, and gives its name to Bocking Blackwater, Bocking North and Bocking South wards of Braintree District Council.

== History ==
In 1290 on 16 September, Bocking was visited by the Archbishop of Canterbury, John of Peckham, who there ordained to the priesthood William of Louth, bishop-elect of Ely.

In 1381, on 4 June, Bocking was the site of the first sit-down discussions between rebels leading to the full Peasants' Revolt, and the subsequent march towards London.

The Deanery Church of St Mary, Bocking, is mainly 15th- and 16th-century flint and limestone, with 19th-century restoration, built on a more ancient church site. It is Grade I listed. The grounds of the church contain a memorial bench to local singer Keith Flint (1969–2019), best known as frontman of The Prodigy. St Peter's Parish Church was built in 1896-97 of yellow brick, in a design intended to be extended at a later date, and is still unfinished; its website describes it as "unusual in appearance from the outside".

Bocking Windmill is a preserved 18th-century post mill and is Grade I listed. It is owned by Braintree District Council and run by the Friends of Bocking Windmill.

In 1862 Kelly's Directory of Essex already stated that "Braintree and Bocking, although distinct parishes, form one continuous town, extending for a mile on the road between Chelmsford and Halstead, and the rivers Blackwater and Podsbrook, and having a united population in 1861 of 8,186."

Bocking was an ancient parish. The parish was abolished in 1934, when most of its area (including the old village of Bocking) merging with the adjoining urban district of Braintree, with the new urban district being called Braintree and Bocking. Smaller parts of the old parish were transferred instead to the neighbouring parishes of Gosfield and Stisted. At the 1931 census (the last before the abolition of the civil parish), Bocking had a population of 4,274. Braintree and Bocking Urban District was abolished in 1974, becoming part of the wider Braintree District. No successor parish was created for the former urban district and so Bocking is directly administered by Braintree District Council.

== Education ==
Bocking has one school called Bocking Church Street School. It used to have another school called Edith Borthwick School but that moved to Springwood Drive in Braintree in September 2015 because its old school in Bocking was too small.

== Bocking in 1870-72 ==
The Imperial Gazetteer of England and Wales gave the following description of Bocking in 1870-1872:

Bocking: a village, a parish and a sub-district, in Braintree, Essex. The village stands on the left bank of the Blackwater river, and on the Braintree railway, adjacent to Braintree; forms a suburb of that town; consists chiefly of one long street; and is a seat of petty sessions.

A trade in baizes, called 'bockings', was at one time prominent; and the manufacture of silk and crape is still carried on.

The parish includes also Bocking-street and Bocking-Church-street, 3/4 and 2 miles distant from Braintree, both with post offices under that town, and the former situated on the branch Roman road from Chelmsford. Acres: 4, 607. Real property: £15, 156. Pop.: 3, 555. Houses: 768. The property is much sub-divided.

The Manor was given by Ethelred to the See of Canterbury; and belongs now to the corporation of the sons of the clergy. The living is a rectory in the diocese of Rochester. Value: £923. Patron: the Archbishop of Canterbury. The church is early English, had anciently 3 altars and 5 chantries, and contains some monuments and 2 brasses. There are: an Independent chapel, much improved in 1869; a charity school, with £50; and other charities, with £172. Dr. Dale, the author of 'Pharmacologia', was a native.

The sub-district contains 5 parishes. Acres: 11, 507. Pop.: 5,281. Houses: 1, 171.

== H. G. Wells on Bocking ==
H. G. Wells, in his What Is Coming? A European Forecast (1916), in the fourth chapter, "Braintree, Bocking, and the Future of the World," uses the differences between Bocking and Braintree, divided, he says, by a single road, to explain the difficulties he expects in establishing World Peace through a World State.

If the curious enquirer will take pick and shovel he will find at any rate one corresponding dualism below the surface. He will find a Bocking water main supplying the houses on the north side and a Braintree water main supplying the south. I rather suspect that the drains are also in duplicate. The total population of Bocking and Braintree is probably little more than thirteen thousand souls altogether, but for that there are two water supplies, two sets of schools, two administrations. To the passing observer the rurality of the Bocking side is indistinguishable from the urbanity of the Braintree side; it is just a little muddier.
