= Foxearth =

Village in Essex, England

Coordinates: 52.0725°N 0.6742°E

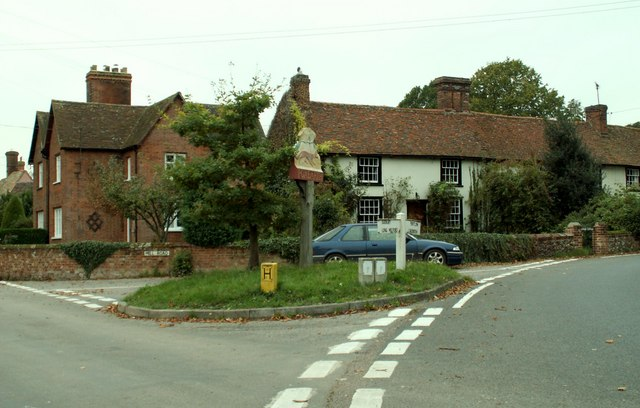
- Foxearth village sign

- Location within Essex
- Population: 274 (Civil Parish, 2021)
- District: Braintree
- Shire county: Essex
- Region: East
- Country: England
- Sovereign state: United Kingdom
- Post town: SUDBURY
- Postcode district: CO10
- Dialling code: 01787
- Police: Essex
- Fire: Essex
- Ambulance: East of England

Foxearth is a village and civil parish in the Braintree District of Essex, England. Its northern land slopes down to the Stour which is the border with Glemsford, Suffolk. Otherwise adjoining are Liston, Belchamp Walter, Belchamp Otten, Pentlow, and Borley, beyond which is the town of Sudbury which has wide-ranging public amenities and transport. At the 2021 census the parish had a population of 274.

== History ==
Extract of OS Map of 1868–1883. Click on map to view wider sheet.

Foxearth is an ancient settlement in north Essex. The parish is more than the size of small parishes Borley and Liston combined, being 1,724 acres (698 ha). It is 3 miles (4.8 km) from Sudbury which has the nearest train station, seven from Halstead, and 56 miles (90 km) from London. The lands are fertile loamy clay soil. Foxearth has always been predominantly agricultural, and had its own watermill at Weston (alias West Mill), its northern extreme, which may have had a church or chapel until dissolved in 1286.

The Domesday survey shows that the small manor of Foxearth Hall, had become the property of Richard Fitz-Gilbert, ancestor of the lords of Clare and states 20 years before at the time of "the Confessor", it noted nineteen sochmen and four free tenant men (almost always meaning families holding land).

Literally "fox’s den", the village is recorded as Focsearde in the Domesday Book (1086) and mediaeval spellings varied somewhat — Foxherde (1202 and many dates up to 1595), and Foxherthe (1232), Foxhierd (1221 & 1428), Foxhole (1212 and 1314), Foxhierd (1246), also Foxhirde (1246), Foxerht (1261), Foxeyerde (1294), Foxherne (1362), Foxhorn (1363), Foxzerd (1428) and finally Foxearth (1594).

In the mid-nineteenth century, Foxearth risked depopulation as its farms called for less labour on mechanisation, however its Reverend John Foster. funded a brewery in 1878. It went on to be run by three generations of the Ward family. Most of the village was rebuilt in red brick, with flint walls, with the brewery in effect providing the means. It was one of the pioneers in the production of bottled beers and also produced several non-alcoholic bottled drinks. The brewery was sold to Taylor Walker & Co in 1957, and the last brew of 62 barrels (9.9 m^{3}) of Small Best Bitter Ale was made on 19 February the following year. The brewery was bought back in a reverse takeover bid in 1960 then demised on being sold again by the Ward family in 1963 to Charrington United Breweries. Its final demolition took place in the 1990s to make way for homes with gardens.

== St. Peter and St. Paul's church ==
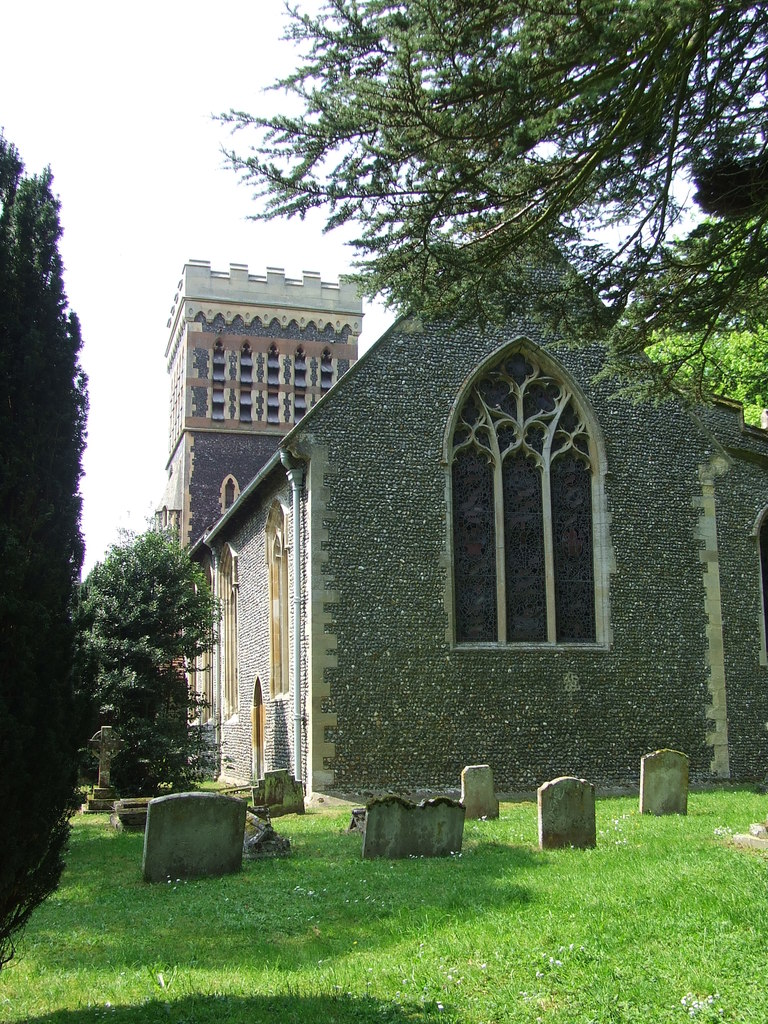
St Peter and St Paul Parish Church

The parish church, to Saints Peter and Paul, stands on the east side of the village.The walls are of flint rubble with modest stone dressings. The roofs are red-tiled, flashed with lead. It features one remaining extra aisle; and chancel adjoining the north side of which is Kemp's Chapel, which belonged to the hall.

It has a large square tower above its west end with eight bells (dormant save the automatic clock chimes) replacing a spire added in 1862 by the Reverend John Foster, and the church was restored and the south porch added at around the same time. The nave is of uncertain date, but circa 1350 a north aisle was added and the chancel was rebuilt. This aisle was rebuilt and widened around 1450, and Kemp's Chapel was added; a chancel arch was likely replaced at the same time by today's late medieval chamfered and moulded beam below the otherwise c. 1350s roof with later infill including fresco of Christ radiant in heaven and caption "Thou art the King of Glory O Christ. Everlasting son of the father", and its hammerbeam painted and gilded probably by J. Clark in 1885.

The chancel, 29 feet (8.8 m) by 18 feet (5.5 m), has an east window of circa 1350: three cinquefoiled-ogee-headed tall lights with tracery making out 11 leaf lights starting with a two-centred head, with chamfered labels. In the north wall is a Victorian doorway, and further west a two-centred arch of c. 1450 and two hollow chamfered orders; the responds are moulded and shafted, with moulded bases and capitals. A large south-easterly window dates to c.1350, later partly remade (two cinquefoiled lights with tracery in a segmental pointed head, under a chamfered label); the alike window to its west is Victorian, except the internal splays and hollow chamfered rear arch, which are of the 15th century. Low parts of the tower have a coloured mosaic, whereas above is painted as is the organ. A circa 1520s wooden screen has six saints' panels around its aperture. Cover carved and crocketed timber spire with pelican on nest. The wooden pulpit is octagonal with spiral stairs and eagle lectern well-embellished, both font and choir stalls are 19th century. 15 painted panels can be found in the church, the chancel retains a piscina for washing vessels of c.1450. Outside are a tall cross war memorial, lych gate and various evergreen trees.

== Governance ==
The civil parish is served by Foxearth and Liston Parish Council, which usually meets in Foxearth Village Hall.

== Sources ==
- Foxearth Brew - Richard Morris (book covering the Brewery's existence)
- Complete text of Richard Morris's book. Foxearth Brew
- Large collection of photographs of Foxearth
- Local history site for Foxearth
