= Liston, Essex =

Village in Essex, England

Coordinates: 52.070°N 0.705°E

Liston
- Village and civil parish
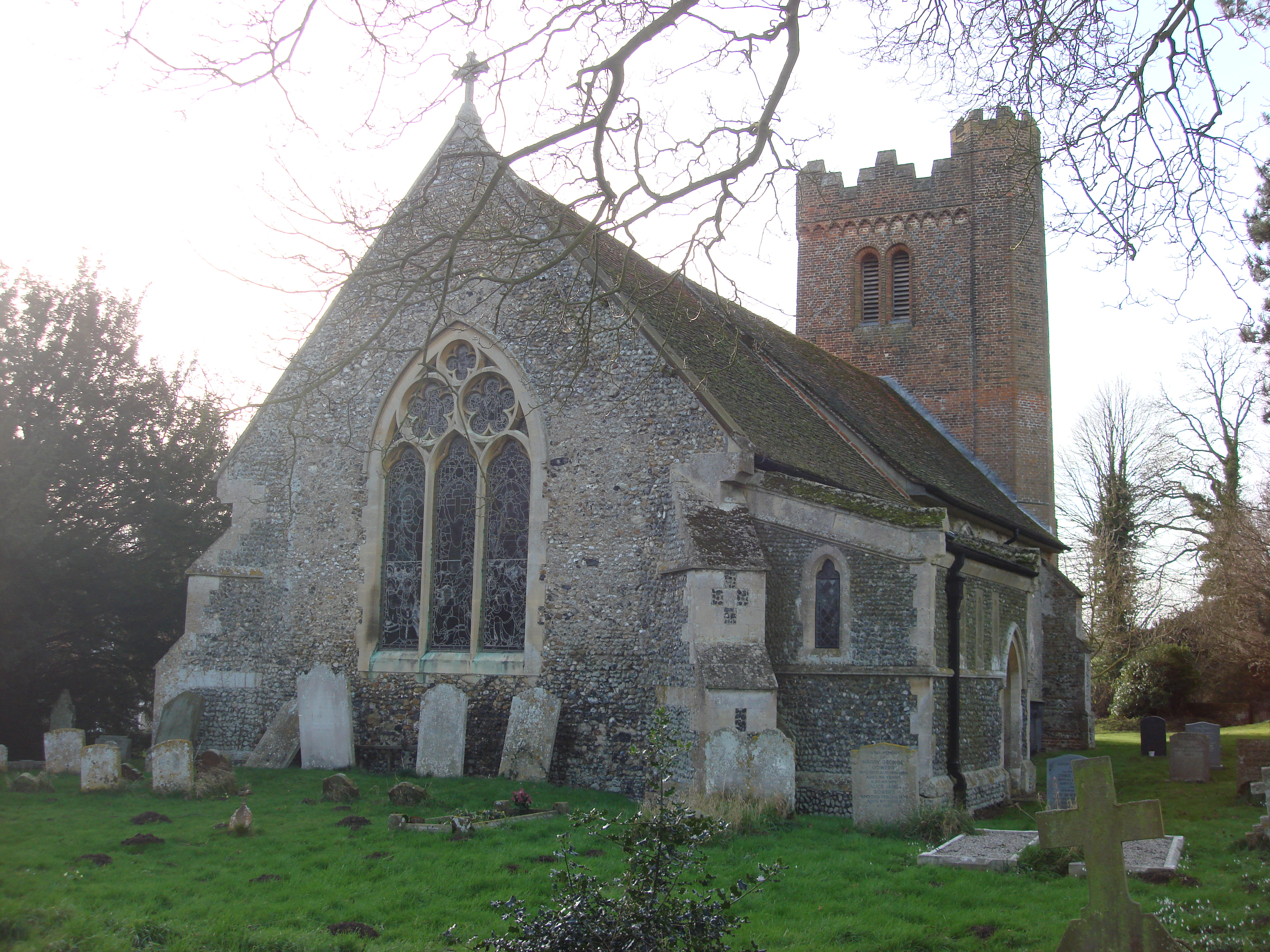

- Location within Essex
- Population: 53 (Parish, 2021)
- OS grid reference: TL853447
- District: Braintree
- Shire county: Essex
- Region: East
- Country: England
- Sovereign state: United Kingdom
- Post town: SUDBURY
- Postcode district: CO10
- Police: Essex
- Fire: Essex
- Ambulance: East of England
- UK Parliament: Braintree

Liston is a small village and civil parish in North Essex, England, located one mile WSW of Long Melford, on the banks of the River Stour. Its parish church dates back to the 12th century, in parts. The parish borders the River Stour, the boundary between Essex and Suffolk. At the 2021 census the parish had a population of 53.

One of the earliest written documents that mentions Liston is the will of Æthelflæd of Damerham who died between 962 and 991. Her father was Ealdorman Ælfgar who was trying to establish a monastic community at Stoke by Nayland where his family had been buried. She left Liston to Æthelmear a kinsman. She was married three times; first to Ealdoman Byrhtnoth who died at the Battle of Maldon, then to King Edmund in 944 and finally after his death to either Æthelstan Rota, or Æthelstan Half-King.

At the time of the Domesday Liston had two manors, one in the hands of Ilbod brother of Arnulf of Hesdin, the other had as Tenant-in-Chief, Hugh of Gournay with the Lord being Geoffrey Talbot.

By 1185 one of the manors at Liston was in the hands of Godfrey the Chamberlain and Alice daughter of Robert, their descendants took the surname De Liston, it was associated with the Sergeancy of making the wafers for the king's coronation, and the family held it unto about 1367 when it was sold to Richard Lyons. Shortly after the manor was sacked in the Peasants' Revolt, and Richard Lyons lost his life.

The manor of Overhall passed to the King who granted it to Sir Hugh De Segrave in 1383.

== Governance ==
The civil parish is served by Foxearth and Liston Parish Council, which usually meets in Foxearth Village Hall.
