= Wickham St. Paul =

Village in Essex, England

Coordinates: 51.995°N 0.666°E

Wickham St Paul
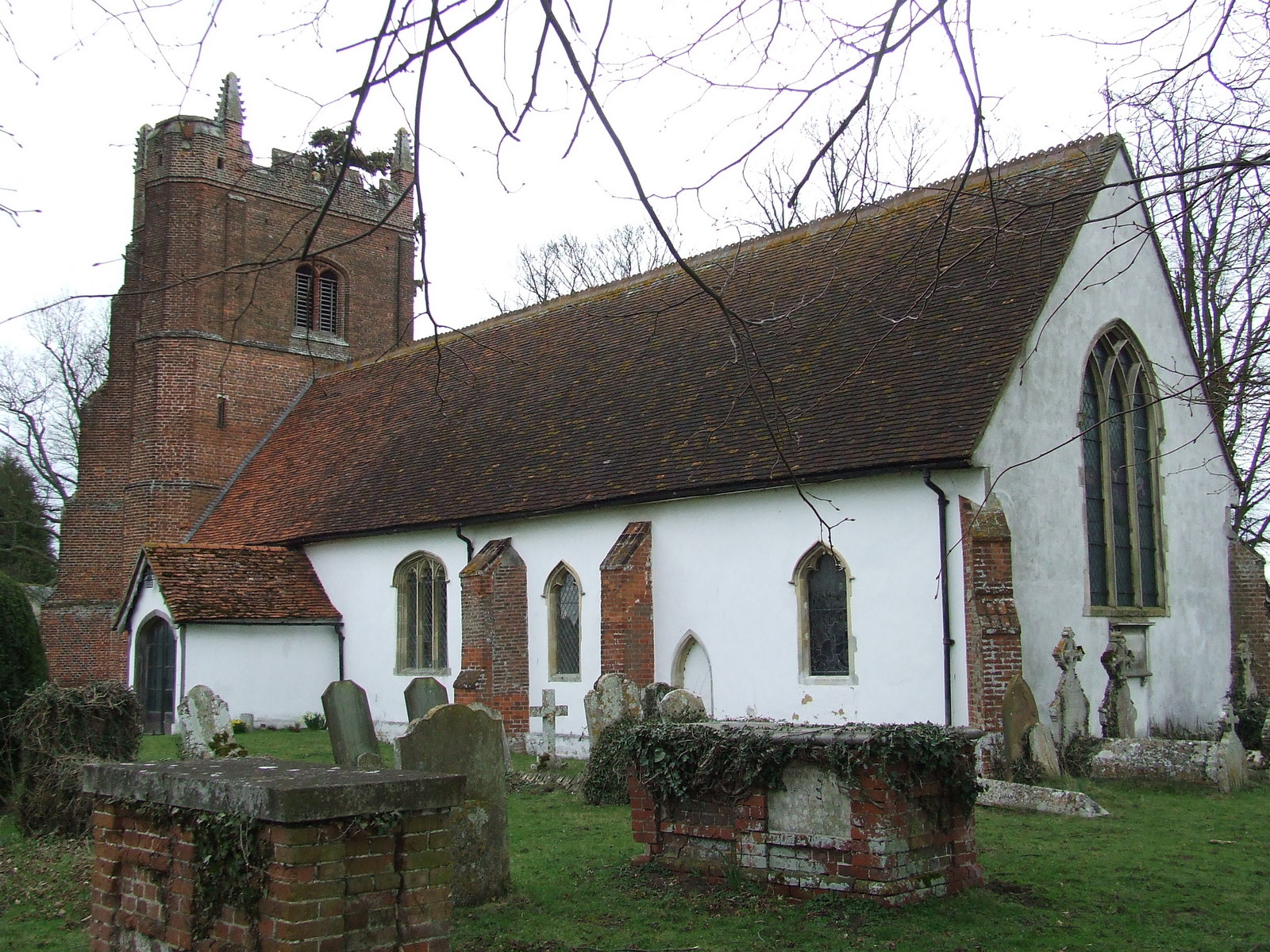
- All Saints' Church

- Location within Essex
- Population: 292 (Parish, 2021)
- Civil parish: Wickham St Paul
- District: Braintree
- Shire county: Essex
- Region: East
- Country: England
- Sovereign state: United Kingdom
- Post town: HALSTEAD
- Postcode district: CO9

Wickham St Paul is a village and civil parish in the Braintree district of Essex, England. It lies 5 miles (8 km) north of Halstead, its post town. At the 2021 census the parish had a population of 292.

The village, in which some of the houses surround a large open green (with cricket pitch and swings), contains a church, a public house, a part-time post office and a grocery store, part of a large farm shop and pick-your-own establishment. A postmill was demolished in 1914.
