= Stisted =

Village and civil parish in Essex, England

Coordinates: 51.89172°N 0.61731°E

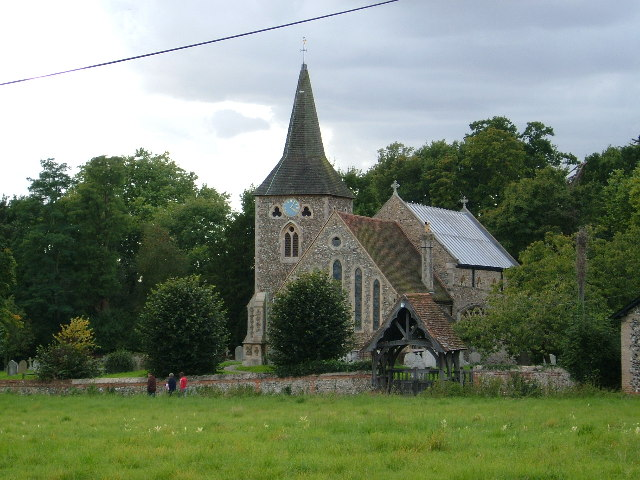
- All Saints' Church, Stisted

- Location within Essex
- Population: 662 (Parish, 2021)
- OS grid reference: TL802247
- District: Braintree
- Shire county: Essex
- Region: East
- Country: England
- Sovereign state: United Kingdom
- Post town: BRAINTREE
- Postcode district: CM77
- Dialling code: 01376
- Police: Essex
- Fire: Essex
- Ambulance: East of England
- UK Parliament: Braintree

Stisted is a village and civil parish in the Braintree District of Essex, England. It lies 3 miles (5 km) east of the centre of the town of Braintree. At the 2021 census the parish had a population of 662.

== History ==
In 1589 the village came to notice when a local woman, Joan Cunny, who was about 80, was accused of witchcraft. She admitted that she had made a circle and made prayers to the devil. Spirits had materialised and she had allowed them home with her and she confessed to feeding them. She had two daughters and the three of them were accused by one of her grandsons. One of her daughters was spared, the other was imprisoned and Cunny was hanged in Chelmsford on 5 July 1589 in line with a 1563 law.

Samuel Stone, founder of Hartford, Connecticut was curate of Stisted from 1627. Charles Forster, grandfather of E. M. Forster, held the benefice of Stisted, and there is an inscription recording that "The tower was rebuilt from the foundations by Onley Savill-Onley and at the same time the chancel was new roofed and restored by the Rev Charles Forster AD 1844".

The manor of Stisted also belonged to the monks of Canterbury Cathedral before the reformation. It was sold to Thomas Wiseman in 1549, whose heirs sold it to William Lingwood in 1685, whose widow (his third wife) bequeathed it to John Savill in 1719. It was inherited by Savill's brother, and then his niece, who married the Rev. Charles Onley, from whom Onley Savill-Onley was descended.

Stisted parish was a peculiar, held by the Dean of Bocking under the Archbishop of Canterbury, until 1845, when it fell under the jurisdiction of Middlesex. In 1895 it became part of the 'see' of Chelmsford.

In 2003, Alan Hurst, the local Member of Parliament denounced an Internet land scheme for selling land in Stisted as if for development, comparing it to a Champagne auction.

Andrew Motion, a former Poet Laureate, was raised there.
