= Ridgewell =

Village in Essex, England

Coordinates: 52.0391°N 0.5244°E

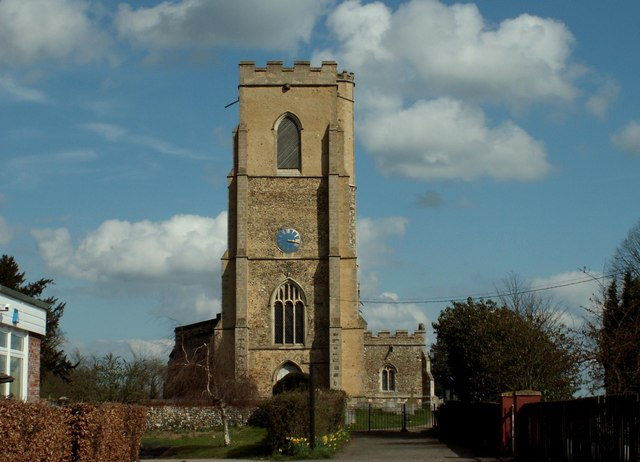
- St. Laurence's Church

- Location within Essex
- Population: 573 (Parish, 2021)
- OS grid reference: TL732408
- Civil parish: Ridgewell
- District: Braintree
- Shire county: Essex
- Region: East
- Country: England
- Sovereign state: United Kingdom
- Post town: HALSTEAD
- Postcode district: CO9
- Dialling code: 01440
- Police: Essex
- Fire: Essex
- Ambulance: East of England
- UK Parliament: Braintree constituency

Ridgewell is a village and civil parish in the Braintree district of Essex, England, about six miles from Haverhill on the main road between Haverhill and Braintree. At the 2021 census the parish had a population of 573.

It was mentioned in the Domesday Book.

Ridgewell has a village shop, primary school and one pub, named 'The White Horse'. St Laurence's Church dates from the 14th century and is a grade I listed building.

The church features six bells arranged in a full-circle ring.

RAF Ridgewell was the base for the USAAF 381st Bomb Group (H) and No. 90 Squadron RAF, part of No. 3 (Bomber) Group, during the Second World War.
