= Helions Bumpstead =

Village in Essex, England

Coordinates: 52.0482°N 0.4052°E

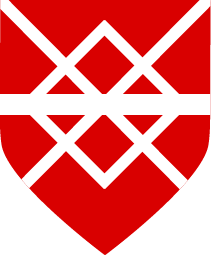
- Shield of Helions Bumpstead

- Location within Essex
- Population: 394 (Parish, 2021)
- OS grid reference: TL650415
- Civil parish: Helions Bumpstead
- District: Braintree
- Shire county: Essex
- Region: East
- Country: England
- Sovereign state: United Kingdom
- Post town: HAVERHILL
- Postcode district: CB9
- Dialling code: 01440
- Police: Essex
- Fire: Essex
- Ambulance: East of England
- UK Parliament: Braintree
- Website: Helions Bumpstead Parish Council Website

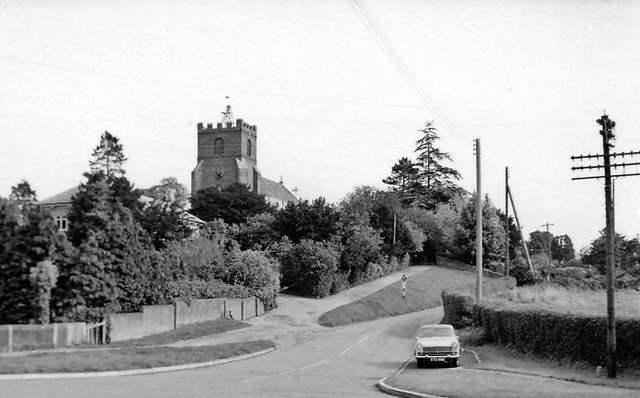
Helions Bumpstead in 1960

Helions Bumpstead is a village and civil parish in the Braintree district, in Essex, England, located near Haverhill and the meeting-point of the Essex, Suffolk and Cambridgeshire borders. It is 2 miles from Steeple Bumpstead. Helions Bumpstead has "the greens"; Pale Green (grid reference TL655421), Wiggens Green (TL663424), and Drapers Green (TL644425). There are four roads into and out of the village; they are Mill Road, Water Lane, Sages End Road and Camps Road. The centre of the village is marked by the crossroads and village green. There is also a meadow with a pond in the centre of the village. At the 2021 census the parish had a population of 394.

== The Village ==
The main defining features of the village are the village post office, the village hall, the Three Horseshoes Public House and St Andrew's Church; the village is in the Diocese of Chelmsford and shares its priest with St Mary's, Steeple Bumpstead. There is also a Gospel Hall in the village. The church has a ring of 8 bells.

The Three Horseshoes Public House was purchased by the community in March 2019 through a community share offer managed by the Helions Bumpstead Community Benefit Society. The pub underwent refurbishment and operated initially for the benefit of the community during the COVID-19 pandemic as a shop and then for Friday evening openings run by volunteers. In December 2021 the pub reopened fully when the Community Benefit Society appointed professional tenants.

Around 2022, the village hall was undergoing refurbishment with money raised over the years from events and grants given to the village. The hall gained a new slate-tile pitched roof, was repainted, and had an extension to the storage area; its interior stage was removed to increase the space for functions.

Every year Helions Bumpstead has its own Summer Fête, including a dog show and evening party, and Christmas Bazaar. A harvest supper is also organised annually to raise funds for the up-keep of St. Andrew's church. A farmers' market showcasing local produce was once held every third Saturday of the month in the village hall. The Helions Bumpstead Village Magazine, comprising news articles and pieces of writing by villagers, is printed quarterly. It is subsidised by the sale of advertising space, which also adds to funds for the village hall.

There is an annual Boxing Day walk, when people meet up at the Three Horseshoes car park and, each year, walk a different route around the village.

The Silver Jubilee of Queen Elizabeth II was marked with the presentation of a village sign, featuring the village symbol (a red badge with a white diagonal cross), which stands in centre of the village. At the time of the Queen's Golden Jubilee, the village held a large fair in her honour. A board featuring photographs of the event was temporarily erected inside the village hall to commemorate it.

== Etymology ==
The name Bumpstead, once referring to the whole area now known as Steeple and Helions Bumpstead, is first attested in a charter of 1042—albeit only in a copy of the mid-twelfth century—as Bumsted and Bumsteda; it next appears in the Domesday Book of 1086 (in the spellings Bumesteda, Bummesteda, and Bunsteda). The first element of the name is agreed probably to have been the Old English word bune, in this context meaning 'reeds' (though it could also mean 'flax' or 'hemp')—either because the settlement was named for the presence of reeds themselves, or because it was named after a river called Bune that had itself been named for its reeds. This interpretation fits the presence of a river characterised by reeds running through Steeple Bumpstead. The second element is thought either to have originated as Old English stede, meaning 'place', or hām-stede, meaning 'homestead'. Thus the name once meant something like 'reed-place' or 'place on the River Bune'.

In time, two distinct centres developed, with the Helions part taking on the name Bumpstead Magna (Great) and the Steeple district Bumpstead Parva (Little). The 'Helions' part of the name Helions Bumpstead comes from the name of the landowner Tihel the Breton, also known as Tihel de Herion, who came from Helléan in the Morhiban district of Brittany: William the Conqueror rewarded Tihel with the manor of Bumpstead for his participation in the Norman Conquest. (The name of Steeple Bumpstead arises from the presence there of a church tower.)

== History ==
Helion Bumpstead's manor house is on a hill facing due east; the church is on a small mound less than half a mile away. In the seventeenth and eighteenth century the lords of the manor were the Reynolds family, which produced several distinguished politicians and judges.

In the Sages End area of the village, a spring called the 'Dropping Well' was the source of the best water in the village. It was noted as running at four gallons a minute in a report by Hubert Airy in 1871 when he visited the village to investigate the poor sanitary state that existed there. Even in the summer months the spring ran nearly two gallons each minute, enticing the inhabitants of Castle Camps to walk there when really hot weather dried up their watering holes. 'Dropping Well' was the source of much of Helions Bumpstead's water, as it made its way down Sages End road to join the main rivulet near the crossroads, thence to flow eastward into the River Stour and to the sea at Harwich.

During the 1914 Farm Workers' strike, the village hosted many talks by leading socialists including Sylvia Pankhurst which attracted the highest turnout of over 2,000 people in July.

The De Havilland Mosquito, one of the most famous aeroplanes of the Second World War, was tested on the airfield near Castle Camps. As of the early 2020s, many of the hangars in which the planes were constructed were still standing.

=== Notable residents ===
The actor Norman Pierce, known for his role as Jim Sturry in the 1942 Ealing Studios film Went the Day Well?, as well as many other roles in films including Saloon Bar, The Four Feathers and The Life and Death of Colonel Blimp, was a resident of Helion Bumpstead and died there in 1968 aged 67.

== See also ==
The Hundred Parishes
