= Birdbrook =

Village and civil parish in Essex, England

Coordinates: 52.0432°N 0.4878°E

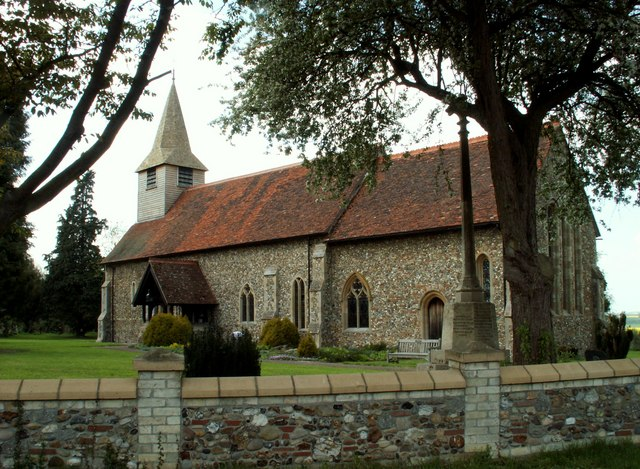
- St. Augustine of Canterbury church, Birdbrook

- Location within Essex
- Population: 379 (Parish, 2021)
- OS grid reference: TL707412
- Civil parish: Birdbrook
- District: Braintree
- Shire county: Essex
- Region: East
- Country: England
- Sovereign state: United Kingdom
- Post town: HALSTEAD
- Postcode district: CO9
- Dialling code: 01440
- Police: Essex
- Fire: Essex
- Ambulance: East of England
- UK Parliament: Braintree

Birdbrook is a village and civil parish in Essex, England. It is located approximately 6 km (3.7 mi) southeast of Haverhill, Suffolk and is 34 km (21 miles) north from the county town of Chelmsford. The village is in the district of Braintree and in the parliamentary constituency of Saffron Walden. It is 93 metres above sea level. At the 2021 census the parish had a population of 379.

There is a public house called the Plough, and the parish church is dedicated to St Augustine of Canterbury.

Nearby Moyns Park, a Grade I listed Elizabethan country house, is said to have been where Ian Fleming put the finishing touches on his novel From Russia, with Love.

Another listed building in the parish is Baythorne Hall.
