= Great Notley =

Village in Essex, England

Coordinates: 51.8595°N 0.5341°E

- Location within Essex
- Population: 6,632 (Parish, 2021)
- OS grid reference: TL740207
- Civil parish: Great Notley
- District: Braintree
- Shire county: Essex
- Region: East
- Country: England
- Sovereign state: United Kingdom
- Post town: BRAINTREE
- Postcode district: CM7, CM77
- Dialling code: 01376
- Police: Essex
- Fire: Essex
- Ambulance: East of England
- UK Parliament: Braintree

Great Notley is a village and civil parish in the Braintree District of Essex, England. It largely comprises modern housing built to the south-west of the town of Braintree, from which it is separated by the A120 road. The name Great Notley was coined in the 1990s for the modern developments here; the area historically formed the western part of the parish of Black Notley. The new civil parish of Great Notley was created in 2000. At the 2021 census the parish had a population of 6,632.

== Archeology ==
Excavations in Great Notley revealed the remains of Iron Age and Roman settlements with a series of enclosures overlaid with a Roman development on the site of the Skyline Business Park, where it is thought that there was a series of occupations on the site from the late Iron Age onwards, which included brewing, farming and the production of textiles.

== Estates ==
Great Notley was designed as a suburban development, a self-sustainable garden village composed of three distinct hamlets linked via a spine road:

- Notley Green hamlet, to the south
- Oaklands Manor hamlet, centred on a new manor house
- Panners Farm hamlet, to the north

It was built mostly by Countryside Properties, and is cited as an example of Countryside's design philosophy of 'instant maturity' and 'instant community'.

The parish also includes the older estate of White Court, now in the centre of the village; a business park, 'Skyline120', and a 40 ha (100 acres) country park.

The parish was created in 2000 from the western part of the parish of Black Notley.

== Amenities ==
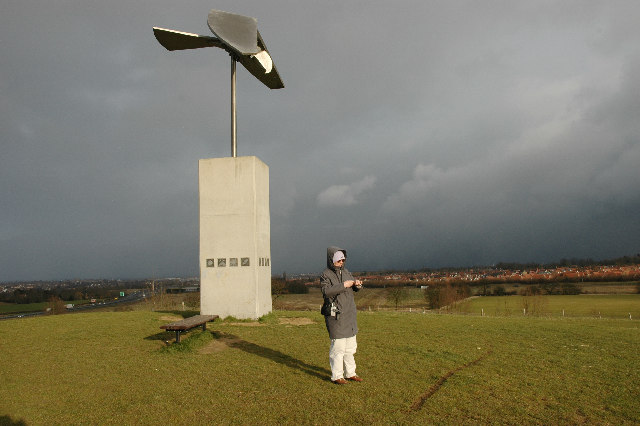
Bird Sculpture above Great Notley Country Park

Due to the size of Great Notley, there is little in the way of indoor entertainment facilities. Outdoor entertainment includes various playgrounds and the aforementioned country park (known as the 'Discovery Centre'), which includes outdoor play equipment, a café and water features.

There are various small businesses operating in Great Notley, including a veterinary centre, a public house (the Prince Louis), an estate agents and a tanning salon. There is also a Tesco supermarket located in the garden village, making it the third Tesco to be built within the Braintree area.

== Schools ==
There are two schools in Great Notley; White Court Primary School and Notley Green Primary School, which was opened in 1999. The main secondary school for the area is Notley High School, which is located in the neighbouring town of Braintree, Essex.
