= Grade I listed buildings in Essex =

There are over 9000 Grade I listed buildings in England. This page is a list of these buildings in the county of Essex.

Essex shown in England

== Basildon ==
Name	Location	Type	Completed (Note: The date given is the date used by Historic England as significant for the initial building or that of an important part in the structure's description.)	Date designated	Grid ref. (Note: The grid reference is based on the British national grid reference system, sometimes known as OSGB36, used by the Ordnance Survey.) Geo-coordinates	Entry number (Note: The "List Entry Number" is a unique number assigned to each listed building and scheduled monument by Historic England.)	Image
Church of St Mary Magdalene	Great Burstead	Church	14th century	4 July 1955	TQ6806592239; 51°36′14″N 0°25′32″E	1122255	Church of St Mary Magdalene More images
Church of St Nicholas	Laindon	Church	14th century	24 March 1950	TQ6879289515; 51°34′45″N 0°26′05″E	1338377	Church of St Nicholas More images

== Braintree ==
Name	Location	Type	Completed	Date designated	Grid ref. Geo-coordinates	Entry number	Image
Parish Church of St Barnabas	Alphamstone, Braintree	Parish church	12th century	12 November 1984	TL8787835461; 51°59′09″N 0°44′05″E	1122865	Parish Church of St Barnabas More images
Parish Church of St Augustine of Canterbury	Ashen, Essex	Parish church	13th century	21 June 1962	TL7473642321; 52°03′06″N 0°32′49″E	1123044	Parish Church of St Augustine of Canterbury More images
Church of St Peter and St Paul	Bardfield Saling, Braintree	Parish church	Decorated	2 December 1967	TL6861326514; 51°54′42″N 0°27′00″E	1122802	Church of St Peter and St Paul More images
Church of St Ethelbert and All Saints	Belchamp Otten, Braintree	Church	c.1130	21 June 1962	TL8033141765; 52°02′42″N 0°37′41″E	1122381	Church of St Ethelbert and All Saints More images
Barn about 50m South West of Paul's Hall	Belchamp St. Paul, Braintree	Barn	c.1200	17 May 1984	TL7972643407; 52°03′36″N 0°37′13″E	1122396	Upload Photo
Church of St Andrew	Belchamp St. Paul, Braintree	Parish church	Mid-15th century	21 June 1962	TL7983343460; 52°03′37″N 0°37′18″E	1166368	Church of St Andrew More images
Parish Church of St Mary the Virgin	Belchamp Walter, Braintree	Parish church	13th century	21 June 1962	TL8274440700; 52°02′05″N 0°39′46″E	1337867	Parish Church of St Mary the Virgin More images
Baythorne Hall	Baythorne End, Birdbrook, Braintree	House	16th century	7 August 1952	TL7194742659; 52°03′20″N 0°30′23″E	1338344	Baythorne Hall
Stanton's Farmhouse	Black Notley, Braintree	Farmhouse	15th century	2 May 1953	TL7686019813; 51°50′56″N 0°33′59″E	1122817	Upload Photo
Parish Church (dedication unknown)	Borley, Braintree	Parish church	11th century	21 June 1962	TL8475443065; 52°03′19″N 0°41′36″E	1169675	Parish Church (dedication unknown) More images
Parish Church of the Holy Trinity	Bradwell, Braintree	Parish church	Early 12th century	21 December 1967	TL8177922156; 51°52′06″N 0°38′20″E	1337594	Parish Church of the Holy Trinity More images
Parish Church of St Andrew	Bulmer	Parish church	12th century	21 June 1962	TL8435340114; 52°01′44″N 0°41′09″E	1169705	Parish Church of St Andrew More images
Church of St Nicholas	Castle Hedingham, Braintree	Parish church	c.1180	21 June 1962	TL7846935604; 51°59′25″N 0°35′52″E	1338048	Church of St Nicholas More images
Hedingham Castle	Castle Hedingham, Braintree	Bailey	1130–40	7 August 1952	TL7870635868; 51°59′33″N 0°36′05″E	1122959	Hedingham Castle More images
Abbey Mill	Coggeshall, Braintree	Silk mill	1820	2 May 1953	TL8554622145; 51°52′01″N 0°41′37″E	1168354	Abbey Mill More images
Church of St Nicholas, Coggeshall Abbey	Coggeshall, Braintree	Abbey chapel	1140–1538	31 October 1966	TL8536722279; 51°52′06″N 0°41′28″E	1337925	Church of St Nicholas, Coggeshall Abbey More images
Coggeshall Abbey (residence)	Coggeshall, Braintree	House	1518–28	2 May 1953	TL8553722244; 51°52′04″N 0°41′36″E	1307099	Coggeshall Abbey (residence) More images
Guest House of Coggeshall Abbey	Coggeshall, Braintree	Guest house/boiler house	c.1190	2 May 1953	TL8553522207; 51°52′03″N 0°41′36″E	1307071	Guest House of Coggeshall Abbey More images
The Abbot's Lodging and Corridor of Coggeshall Abbey	Coggeshall, Braintree	House	Late 16th century	2 May 1953	TL8552922241; 51°52′04″N 0°41′36″E	1123191	Upload Photo
Parish Church of St Peter Ad Vincula	Coggeshall, Braintree	Church	15th century	31 October 1966	TL8535023016; 51°52′30″N 0°41′28″E	1337953	Parish Church of St Peter Ad Vincula More images
Paycocke's	Coggeshall, Braintree	Jettied house	15th century	2 May 1953	TL8479022501; 51°52′14″N 0°40′58″E	1337597	Paycocke's More images
The Grange Barn	Coggeshall, Braintree	Grange barn	C12/early 13th century	31 October 1966	TL8490322220; 51°52′04″N 0°41′03″E	1123112	The Grange Barn More images
Parish Church of St Andrew	Colne Engaine, Braintree	Parish church	C12-early 16th century	21 June 1962	TL8502630365; 51°56′28″N 0°41′25″E	1123236	Parish Church of St Andrew More images
Parish Church of All Saints	Cressing, Braintree	Parish church	12th century	21 December 1967	TL7942620435; 51°51′13″N 0°36′14″E	1337619	Parish Church of All Saints More images
The Barley Barn, 40m North West of Cressing Temple Farmhouse	Cressing, Braintree	Barn	Early 16th century	2 May 1953	TL7989318774; 51°50′19″N 0°36′35″E	1123865	The Barley Barn, 40m North West of Cressing Temple Farmhouse More images
The Wheat Barn, 35 Metres North East of Cressing Temple Farmhouse	Cressing, Braintree	Barn	Early 16th century	2 May 1953	TL7994218771; 51°50′19″N 0°36′38″E	1123866	The Wheat Barn, 35 Metres North East of Cressing Temple Farmhouse More images
Parish Church of St Andrew	Earls Colne, Braintree	Parish church	13th century	21 June 1962	TL8606628826; 51°55′37″N 0°42′17″E	1337907	Parish Church of St Andrew More images
Parish Church of St Mary the Virgin	Fairstead, Essex	Church	16th century	21 December 1967	TL7678516689; 51°49′15″N 0°33′49″E	1337780	Parish Church of St Mary the Virgin More images
Faulkbourne Hall	Faulkbourne, Braintree	Country house	Early 15th century	2 May 1953	TL8026816434; 51°49′03″N 0°36′50″E	1337782	Faulkbourne Hall More images
Parish Church of St Germanus	Faulkbourne, Braintree	Parish church	12th century	21 December 1967	TL8003016573; 51°49′08″N 0°36′38″E	1337803	Parish Church of St Germanus More images
Parish Church of All Saints	Feering, Braintree	Parish church	C12/13	21 December 1967	TL8722020417; 51°51′03″N 0°43′01″E	1123841	Parish Church of All Saints More images
St John the Baptist Church, Finchingfield	Finchingfield, Braintree	Parish church	C12-C14	21 December 1967	TL6862432806; 51°58′05″N 0°27′12″E	1122729	St John the Baptist Church, Finchingfield More images
Spains Hall	Finchingfield, Braintree	House	17th century	2 May 1953	TL6787634017; 51°58′45″N 0°26′35″E	1138980	Spains Hall More images
The Guildhall	Finchingfield, Braintree	Apartment	1985	21 December 1967	TL6858032814; 51°58′06″N 0°27′09″E	1115594	The Guildhall More images
Church of St Mary the Virgin	Gestingthorpe, Braintree	Parish church	13th century	21 June 1962	TL8122038562; 52°00′57″N 0°38′22″E	1123078	Church of St Mary the Virgin More images
Church of St Catherine	Gosfield, Braintree	Parish church	C15/C16	21 June 1962	TL7778129403; 51°56′05″N 0°35′05″E	1338075	Church of St Catherine More images
Gosfield Hall	Gosfield, Braintree	House	Mid-16th century	1 August 1946	TL7751229713; 51°56′15″N 0°34′51″E	1122938	Gosfield Hall More images
Barn Approximately 45 Metres East of Great Lodge	Great Bardfield, Braintree	Barn	Early 16th century	2 May 1953	TL6948929061; 51°56′03″N 0°27′50″E	1335863	Upload Photo
Parish Church of St Mary the Virgin	Great Bardfield, Braintree	Parish church	12th century	21 December 1967	TL6780030368; 51°56′47″N 0°26′24″E	1123494	Parish Church of St Mary the Virgin More images
Church of St Giles	Great Maplestead, Braintree	Parish church	12th century	21 June 1962	TL8081734570; 51°58′49″N 0°37′53″E	1337989	Church of St Giles More images
Parish Church of St Andrew	Great Yeldham, Braintree	Parish church	c.1350	21 June 1962	TL7577838667; 52°01′07″N 0°33′37″E	1123010	Parish Church of St Andrew More images
Parish Church of St Andrew	Halstead, Braintree	Parish church	14th century	24 February 1950	TL8152330691; 51°56′42″N 0°38′23″E	1338284	Parish Church of St Andrew More images
Parish Church of St Mary	Kelvedon, Braintree	Parish church	Early 12th century	21 December 1967	TL8564518566; 51°50′05″N 0°41′35″E	1337631	Parish Church of St Mary More images
1–5 High Street	Kelvedon, Braintree	Abbots summer palace	Early 16th century	21 December 1967	TL8590518429; 51°50′01″N 0°41′48″E	1123814	1–5 High Street More images
Parish Church of the Holy Innocents	Lamarsh, Braintree	Parish church	Early 12th century or earlier	21 June 1962	TL8898136059; 51°59′27″N 0°45′04″E	1166331	Parish Church of the Holy Innocents More images
Parish Church (dedication unknown)	Liston, Braintree	Parish church	Early 12th century	21 June 1962	TL8527444782; 52°04′13″N 0°42′06″E	1122335	Parish Church (dedication unknown) More images
Church of All Saints	Middleton, Braintree	Parish church	Mid-12th century	21 June 1962	TL8709639675; 52°01′26″N 0°43′32″E	1123271	Church of All Saints More images
Panfield Hall	Panfield, Braintree	Great house	16th century	2 May 1953	TL7399425029; 51°53′48″N 0°31′39″E	1337833	Upload Photo
Parish Church of St John the Baptist	Pebmarsh, Braintree	Parish church	Earlier origin	21 June 1962	TL8536733489; 51°58′08″N 0°41′49″E	1146603	Parish Church of St John the Baptist More images
Church of St Gregory and St George	Pentlow, Braintree	Parish church	12th century	21 June 1962	TL8127246162; 52°05′03″N 0°38′39″E	1232662	Church of St Gregory and St George More images
Church of All Saints	Rayne Hall Green, Rayne, Braintree	Parish church	c.1510	21 December 1967	TL7330922913; 51°52′40″N 0°30′59″E	1308377	Church of All Saints More images
Parish Church of St Laurence	Ridgewell, Braintree	Parish church	14th century and 15th century	21 June 1962	TL7399240908; 52°02′21″N 0°32′07″E	1165620	Parish Church of St Laurence More images
Church of St Mary and All Saints	Rivenhall, Braintree	Parish church	10th century	1 March 1950	TL8280017791; 51°49′44″N 0°39′05″E	1169594	Church of St Mary and All Saints More images
Parish Church of St Andrew	Shalford, Braintree	Church	12th century	21 December 1967	TL7239729245; 51°56′06″N 0°30′23″E	1147647	Parish Church of St Andrew More images
Parish Church of St Peter and St Thomas	Stambourne, Braintree	Parish church	Late 11th century	21 June 1962	TL7210538858; 52°01′17″N 0°30′25″E	1317130	Parish Church of St Peter and St Thomas More images
Moyns Park	Steeple Bumpstead, Braintree	Country house	Late 16th century	7 August 1952	TL6943840621; 52°02′17″N 0°28′08″E	1338363	Moyns Park More images
Parish Church of St Mary the Virgin	Steeple Bumpstead, Braintree	Parish church	11th century	21 June 1962	TL6790241055; 52°02′33″N 0°26′48″E	1166315	Parish Church of St Mary the Virgin More images
Parish Church of All Saints	Stisted, Braintree	Boundary stone	17th century	21 December 1967	TL7987324601; 51°53′27″N 0°36′45″E	1123870	Parish Church of All Saints More images
Parish Church of St Mary the Virgin	Sturmer, Braintree	Parish church	Early 11th century	21 June 1962	TL6902243899; 52°04′04″N 0°27′52″E	1122274	Parish Church of St Mary the Virgin More images
Ringers Farmhouse	Terling, Braintree	Farmhouse	Early 16th century	2 May 1953	TL7617113334; 51°47′27″N 0°33′11″E	1123406	Upload Photo
Parish Church of St Margaret	Tilbury Juxta Clare, Braintree	Parish church	15th century	21 June 1962	TL7595540290; 52°01′59″N 0°33′49″E	1122987	Parish Church of St Margaret More images
Parish Church of St Margaret of Antioch	Toppesfield, Braintree	Parish church	c.1300	21 June 1962	TL7396337447; 52°00′29″N 0°32′00″E	1165328	Parish Church of St Margaret of Antioch More images
Parish Church of St Mary Magdalene	Wethersfield, Braintree	Parish church	12th century	21 December 1967	TL7122131250; 51°57′12″N 0°29′25″E	1337860	Parish Church of St Mary Magdalene More images
Church of St Ethelreda	White Notley, Braintree	Parish church	11th century	2 January 1985	TL7854618236; 51°50′03″N 0°35′24″E	1147914	Church of St Ethelreda More images
Church of St Nicolas	Witham, Braintree	Parish church	14th century Additions	1 March 1950	TL8172915378; 51°48′27″N 0°38′05″E	1338236	Church of St Nicolas More images
Church of St Mary the Virgin	Church Street, Bocking, Braintree	Parish church	14th century	25 October 1951	TL7568925684; 51°54′07″N 0°33′08″E	1122530	Church of St Mary the Virgin More images
Bocking Windmill	Church Street, Bocking, Braintree	Post mill	c.1680	25 October 1951	TL7630725967; 51°54′16″N 0°33′41″E	1122492	Bocking Windmill More images

== Brentwood ==
Name	Location	Type	Completed	Date designated	Grid ref. Geo-coordinates	Entry number	Image
Church of St Laurence	Blackmore, Hook End and Wyatts Green, Brentwood	Church	Mid-12th century	20 February 1967	TL6030501611; 51°41′25″N 0°19′04″E	1197161	Church of St Laurence More images
Church of All Saints	Doddinghurst, Brentwood	Church	c.1400	20 February 1967	TQ5892099001; 51°40′02″N 0°17′48″E	1197268	Church of All Saints More images
Thorndon Hall	Thorndon Park, Herongate and Ingrave, Brentwood	Apartments	1980	21 October 1958	TQ6170591818; 51°36′07″N 0°20′01″E	1297212	Thorndon Hall More images
Church of St Edmund and St Mary	Ingatestone, Ingatestone and Fryerning, Brentwood	Parish church	Late 11th century	10 April 1967	TQ6512299592; 51°40′15″N 0°23′11″E	1297196	Church of St Edmund and St Mary More images
Church of St Mary the Virgin	Fryerning, Ingatestone and Fryerning, Brentwood	Parish church	Late 11th century	10 April 1967	TL6384600110; 51°40′33″N 0°22′06″E	1197282	Church of St Mary the Virgin More images
Ingatestone Hall	Ingatestone, Ingatestone and Fryerning, Brentwood	Country house	1539	29 December 1952	TQ6542298570; 51°39′42″N 0°23′25″E	1187315	Ingatestone Hall More images
Kelvedon Hall	Kelvedon Hatch, Brentwood	Country house	c.1743	27 August 1952	TL5584800030; 51°40′39″N 0°15′10″E	1279546	Kelvedon Hall More images
St. Giles Church, Mountnessing	Mountnessing, Brentwood	Parish church	Late 11th century	10 April 1967	TQ6483196581; 51°38′38″N 0°22′51″E	1208238	St. Giles Church, Mountnessing More images
Church of St Thomas the Apostle	Navestock, Brentwood	Parish church	C11-C12	20 February 1967	TQ5404798374; 51°39′47″N 0°13′33″E	1197342	Church of St Thomas the Apostle More images
Church of St Peter and St Paul	Stondon Massey, Brentwood	Church	Saxon/Norman	20 February 1967	TL5726501587; 51°41′28″N 0°16′26″E	1297178	Church of St Peter and St Paul More images
Church of St Peter	Little Warley, West Horndon, Brentwood	Church	15th century	21 October 1958	TQ6044188650; 51°34′26″N 0°18′50″E	1207397	Church of St Peter More images
Church of St Mary the Virgin	Great Warley, Brentwood	Church	1902–04	20 February 1976	TQ5888889990; 51°35′11″N 0°17′31″E	1197210	Church of St Mary the Virgin More images

== Castle Point ==
Name	Location	Type	Completed	Date designated	Grid ref. Geo-coordinates	Entry number	Image
Church of St James the Less	Hadleigh	Parish church	Mid-12th century	7 August 1952	TQ8101287025; 51°33′11″N 0°36′34″E	1337692	Church of St James the Less More images
Church of St Mary the Virgin	South Benfleet	Parish church	12th century	7 August 1952	TQ7782986138; 51°32′46″N 0°33′48″E	1123690	Church of St Mary the Virgin More images
Hadleigh Castle	Castle Point	Castle	Early 13th century	7 August 1952	TQ8097886090; 51°32′41″N 0°36′31″E	1123687	Hadleigh Castle More images

== Chelmsford ==
Name	Location	Type	Completed	Date designated	Grid ref. Geo-coordinates	Entry number	Image
Boreham House	Boreham, Chelmsford	House	Early 19th century	29 December 1952	TL7462209152; 51°45′14″N 0°31′43″E	1338403	Boreham House More images
Church of St Andrew	Boreham, Chelmsford	Parish church	Late C11-early 12th century	10 April 1967	TL7561009614; 51°45′28″N 0°32′35″E	1122215	Church of St Andrew More images
New Hall formerly Palace of Beaulieu	Boreham, Chelmsford	House	Existing	29 December 1952	TL7346010284; 51°45′52″N 0°30′44″E	1338404	New Hall formerly Palace of Beaulieu More images
Church of St John the Baptist	Danbury, Chelmsford	Church	c.1233	10 April 1967	TL7793005119; 51°43′00″N 0°34′28″E	1122201	Church of St John the Baptist More images
Barn on Roadside at Falconers Hall and known as the Top Barn & Barn on Roadside at Faulkner's Hall and known as the Granary	Good Easter, Chelmsford	Barn	Late 15th century or early 16th century	7 August 1978	TL6260012147; 51°47′04″N 0°21′21″E	1237322	Barn on Roadside at Falconers Hall and known as the Top Barn & Barn on Roadside at Faulkner's Hall and known as the Granary More images
Church of St Mary the Virgin	Great and Little Leighs, Chelmsford	Church	1330	10 April 1967	TL7384315586; 51°48′43″N 0°31′14″E	1171104	Church of St Mary the Virgin More images
Leez Priory	Great and Little Leighs, Chelmsford	Augustinian monastery	13th century	29 December 1952	TL7007518526; 51°50′22″N 0°28′02″E	1171386	Leez Priory More images
Leez Priory Inner Gatehouse (that Part in Dunmow Road)	Great and Little Leighs, Chelmsford	Gatehouse	Early 13th century	6 August 1984	TL7015118575; 51°50′23″N 0°28′06″E	1322295	Leez Priory Inner Gatehouse (that Part in Dunmow Road) More images
Leez Priory, Part of Quadrangle, Now a House (that Part in Dunmow Road)	Great and Little Leighs, Chelmsford	House	post 1536	20 February 1967	TL7006918542; 51°50′23″N 0°28′02″E	1112814	Leez Priory, Part of Quadrangle, Now a House (that Part in Dunmow Road) More images
Church of St Mary	Great Baddow, Chelmsford	Parish church	12th century	10 April 1967	TL7295204847; 51°42′56″N 0°30′08″E	1122149	Church of St Mary More images
Black Chapel	North End, Great Waltham, Chelmsford	Chapel	Late 15th century	10 April 1967	TL6626117934; 51°50′07″N 0°24′42″E	1338494	Black Chapel More images
Church of St Mary and Laurence	Great Waltham, Chelmsford	Church	Norman	10 April 1967	TL6955713447; 51°47′38″N 0°27′26″E	1122058	Church of St Mary and Laurence More images
Langleys	Great Waltham, Chelmsford	House	c.1620	29 June 1952	TL6992613664; 51°47′45″N 0°27′46″E	1305533	Langleys More images
Church of St Mary the Virgin	Little Baddow, Chelmsford	Church	Late 11th century	10 April 1967	TL7644808067; 51°44′37″N 0°33′16″E	1172194	Church of St Mary the Virgin More images
Pleshey Castle Bridge	Pleshey, Chelmsford	Bridge	15th century	19 June 1975	TL6651514446; 51°48′14″N 0°24′49″E	1235567	Pleshey Castle Bridge More images
Church of All Saints	Rettendon, Chelmsford	Church	c.1200	10 April 1967	TQ7702296004; 51°38′06″N 0°33′24″E	1235573	Church of All Saints More images
Church of St Mary	Runwell, Chelmsford	Church	c.1200	10 April 1967	TQ7536094404; 51°37′16″N 0°31′54″E	1235843	Church of St Mary More images
Church of All Saints	Essex, Chelmsford	Church	Pre-12th-century origins	10 April 1967	TQ6877398649; 51°39′41″N 0°26′20″E	1236734	Church of All Saints More images
Church of St Mary	Woodham Ferrers, Woodham Ferrers and Bicknacre, Chelmsford	Parish church	13th century	10 April 1967	TQ7978299398; 51°39′53″N 0°35′53″E	1236909	Church of St Mary More images
Aubyns	Writtle, Chelmsford	Jettied house	c.1500	10 April 1967	TL6772406212; 51°43′46″N 0°25′38″E	1237095	Aubyns More images
Cathedral Church of St Mary the Virgin	Chelmsford	Cathedral	1913	20 May 1949	TL7081406948; 51°44′07″N 0°28′20″E	1328779	Cathedral Church of St Mary the Virgin More images

== Colchester ==
Name	Location	Type	Completed	Date designated	Grid ref. Geo-coordinates	Entry number	Image
Church of St Peter	Boxted, Colchester	Church	Norman	7 April 1965	TL9983733242; 51°57′42″N 0°54′26″E	1238709	Church of St Peter More images
Songers	Boxted, Colchester	House	14th century	30 June 1975	TM0072032263; 51°57′09″N 0°55′10″E	1238602	Songers
Church of St Barnabas	Chappel, Colchester	Church	13th century	7 April 1965	TL8941628367; 51°55′18″N 0°45′11″E	1238806	Church of St Barnabas More images
Church of St Mary	Easthorpe, Copford, Colchester	Church	12th century	7 April 1965	TL9124521500; 51°51′33″N 0°46′33″E	1238968	Church of St Mary More images
Church of St Michael and All Angels	Copford, Colchester	Church	12th century	7 April 1965	TL9349822701; 51°52′10″N 0°48′33″E	1274018	Church of St Michael and All Angels More images
Old Grammar School & Well House	Dedham, Colchester	House	1732	23 June 1952	TM0580633140; 51°57′31″N 0°59′38″E	1239338	Old Grammar School & Well House More images
Parish Church of St Mary	Dedham, Colchester	Parish church	Perpendicular	7 April 1965	TM0572933126; 51°57′31″N 0°59′34″E	1239340	Parish Church of St Mary More images
Shermans	Dedham, Colchester	House	c.1735	23 June 1952	TM0572533177; 51°57′32″N 0°59′34″E	1239328	Shermans More images
Southfields & the Flemish Cottages	The Drift, Dedham, Colchester	House	Later	23 June 1952	TM0585432849; 51°57′22″N 0°59′40″E	1239217	Southfields & the Flemish Cottages More images
Parish Church of St Edmund King and Martyr	East Mersea, Colchester	Church	12th century	7 April 1965	TM0509714182; 51°47′19″N 0°58′21″E	1239659	Parish Church of St Edmund King and Martyr More images
Church of St Andrew	Fingringhoe, Colchester	Parish church	12th century	7 April 1965	TM0296720388; 51°50′43″N 0°56′43″E	1239716	Church of St Andrew More images
Church of All Saints	Fordham, Colchester	Church	c.1340	7 April 1965	TL9275028087; 51°55′05″N 0°48′05″E	1239789	Church of All Saints More images
Church of All Saints	Great Horkesley, Colchester	Lych Gate	c.1901	7 April 1965	TL9714632380; 51°57′18″N 0°52′04″E	1222737	Church of All Saints More images
Church of St Barnabas	Great Tey, Colchester	Parish church	12th century	7 April 1965	TL8919925783; 51°53′54″N 0°44′55″E	1223408	Church of St Barnabas More images
Church of St Mary	Langham, Colchester	Church	Modern	7 April 1965	TM0344833700; 51°57′52″N 0°57′36″E	1223452	Church of St Mary More images
Church of St Mary the Virgin	Layer Marney, Colchester	Church	Early 16th century	7 April 1965	TL9282417418; 51°49′20″N 0°47′47″E	1223987	Church of St Mary the Virgin More images
Layer Marney Tower	Layer Marney, Colchester	House	20th century	23 June 1952	TL9285117480; 51°49′22″N 0°47′49″E	1223988	Layer Marney Tower More images
Church of St John the Baptist	Layer-de-la-Haye, Colchester	Church	12th century	7 April 1965	TL9649419130; 51°50′10″N 0°51′02″E	1223841	Church of St John the Baptist More images
Church of St Andrew	Marks Tey, Colchester	Parish church	Romanesque	7 April 1965	TL9112123881; 51°52′51″N 0°46′31″E	1266781	Church of St Andrew More images
Church of St James	Little Tey, Marks Tey, Colchester	Church	19th century	7 April 1965	TL8914823753; 51°52′49″N 0°44′48″E	1224521	Church of St James More images
Parish Church of All Saints	Inworth, Messing-cum-Inworth, Colchester	Church	15th century	7 April 1965	TL8792917852; 51°49′40″N 0°43′33″E	1224592	Parish Church of All Saints More images
Church of St John the Baptist	Mount Bures, Colchester	Church	Norman	7 April 1965	TL9045932476; 51°57′29″N 0°46′14″E	1224669	Church of St John the Baptist More images
Church of St Mary the Virgin	Peldon, Colchester	Church	12th century	7 April 1965	TL9894316776; 51°48′51″N 0°53′05″E	1224702	Church of St Mary the Virgin More images
Crepping Hall	Wakes Colne, Colchester	House	c.1314	23 June 1952	TL9089828451; 51°55′19″N 0°46′29″E	1266574	Crepping Hall More images
Church of St Mary	West Bergholt, Colchester	Church	c.1000	7 April 1965	TL9529828086; 51°55′01″N 0°50′18″E	1225120	Church of St Mary More images
Church of St Peter and St Paul	West Mersea, Colchester	Church	11th century	11 October 1949	TM0091612504; 51°46′30″N 0°54′39″E	1225167	Church of St Peter and St Paul More images
Old Garrison House	Wivenhoe, Colchester	Jettied house	c.1600	3 May 1949	TM0388121490; 51°51′17″N 0°57′33″E	1266478	Old Garrison House More images
Church of St Andrew	Wormingford, Colchester	Parish church	Norman	7 April 1965	TL9329032245; 51°57′18″N 0°48′42″E	1225419	Church of St Andrew More images
Bourne Mill	Colchester	House	1591	24 February 1950	TM0056523846; 51°52′38″N 0°54′45″E	1123673	Bourne Mill More images
East Hill House	Colchester	Town House	Early 18th century	2 December 1971	TM0008325242; 51°53′23″N 0°54′22″E	1168783	East Hill House More images
East Lodge Gate House	Colchester	House	17th century	24 February 1950	TL9999625266; 51°53′24″N 0°54′18″E	1123612	East Lodge Gate House More images
Former Church of Holy Trinity	Colchester	Church	Pre-Conquest	24 February 1950	TL9962625118; 51°53′20″N 0°53′58″E	1169575	Former Church of Holy Trinity More images
Hollytrees Museum	Castle Park, Colchester	House	Early 18th century	24 February 1950	TL9996025268; 51°53′24″N 0°54′16″E	1168810	Hollytrees Museum More images
Red Lion Hotel	Colchester	Hall House	c.1470	24 February 1950	TL9967325205; 51°53′23″N 0°54′01″E	1123599	Red Lion Hotel More images
Ruins of Priory Church of St Botolph	Colchester	Church	Mid-12th century	2 December 1971	TL9994824958; 51°53′14″N 0°54′15″E	1337764	Ruins of Priory Church of St Botolph More images
St John's Abbey Gatehouse	Colchester	Gatehouse	Founded 11th century	2 December 1971	TL9976724753; 51°53′08″N 0°54′05″E	1337765	St John's Abbey Gatehouse More images
The Balkerne Gate	Colchester	Gate	C2	24 February 1950	TL9923625186; 51°53′23″N 0°53′38″E	1123668	The Balkerne Gate More images
Colchester Castle keep (including excavated remains of forebuilding in moat)	Castle Park, Colchester	Keep	c.1080	24 February 1950	TL9986425325; 51°53′26″N 0°54′11″E	1123674	Colchester Castle keep (including excavated remains of forebuilding in moat) More images
The Roman Town Wall	Colchester	Town Wall	Late 3rd century	2 December 1971	TL9942125504; 51°53′33″N 0°53′48″E	1123664	The Roman Town Wall More images
Town Hall	Colchester	Civic building	1898	25 March 1968	TL9957725220; 51°53′23″N 0°53′56″E	1337736	Town Hall More images
Winnock's Almshouses	Colchester	Almshouse	1678	24 February 1950	TM0011424714; 51°53′06″N 0°54′23″E	1123565	Winnock's Almshouses More images

== Epping Forest ==
Name	Location	Type	Completed	Date designated	Grid ref. Geo-coordinates	Entry number	Image
Barn North East of Rookwood Hall and South East of Item 2/4	Abbess Beauchamp and Berners Roding, Epping Forest	Barn	15th century	20 February 1967	TL5609210987; 51°46′33″N 0°15′40″E	1251306	Upload Photo
Fyfield Hall	Fyfield, Epping Forest	Hall House	Medieval	27 August 1957	TL5724806873; 51°44′19″N 0°16′34″E	1111326	Upload Photo
Lampetts	Fyfield, Epping Forest	Cross Wing House	Early 14th century	27 August 1957	TL5618807217; 51°44′31″N 0°15′39″E	1146540	Upload Photo
Church of St Mary the Virgin	High Ongar, Epping Forest	Parish church	Mid-12th century	20 February 1967	TL5652203765; 51°42′39″N 0°15′51″E	1111302	Church of St Mary the Virgin More images
Church of All Saints	Nazeing, Epping Forest	Parish church	Late 12th century	20 February 1967	TL4137906974; 51°44′37″N 0°02′47″E	1111135	Church of All Saints More images
Church of St Andrew	Greensted, Ongar, Epping Forest	Church	c845	11 April 1984	TL5387902974; 51°42′16″N 0°13′32″E	1124095	Church of St Andrew More images
Church of St Martin	Chipping Ongar, Ongar, Epping Forest	Church	Late 11th century	20 February 1967	TL5532202956; 51°42′14″N 0°14′47″E	1337485	Church of St Martin More images
Church of St Peter	Roydon, Epping Forest	Parish church	13th century	20 February 1967	TL4078610266; 51°46′24″N 0°02′21″E	1111120	Church of St Peter More images
Netherhall	Roydon, Epping Forest	Moat	Mid-15th century	4 July 1984	TL3977608271; 51°45′20″N 0°01′25″E	1182255	Netherhall More images
Parish Church of St Mary the Virgin	Sheering, Epping Forest	Parish church	LATE 13th century TO LATE 14th century	20 February 1967	TL5085213616; 51°48′03″N 0°11′11″E	1146947	Parish Church of St Mary the Virgin More images
Church of All Saints	Theydon Garnon, Epping Forest	Priests House	Medieval	20 February 1967	TQ4718399379; 51°40′26″N 0°07′38″E	1169440	Church of All Saints More images
Church of St Michael the Archangel	Theydon Mount, Epping Forest	Parish church	c.1611	20 February 1967	TQ4926499236; 51°40′19″N 0°09′26″E	1169697	Church of St Michael the Archangel More images
Hill Hall and attached Service Wings to North and West	Theydon Mount, Epping Forest	Country house	c.1569–75	11 January 1974	TQ4892299466; 51°40′27″N 0°09′08″E	1123963	Hill Hall and attached Service Wings to North and West More images
Church of the Holy Cross and St Lawrence & Ruins to East of Church of Holy Cross and St Lawrence	Waltham Abbey, Epping Forest	Church	Later alteration	26 January 1956	TL3811200646; 51°41′15″N 0°00′12″W	1124155	Church of the Holy Cross and St Lawrence & Ruins to East of Church of Holy Cross and St Lawrence More images
Ministry of Defence Building L157 (group C Incorporating Mills)	Waltham Abbey Royal Gunpowder Mills, Epping Forest	Gunpowder Works	1861	26 November 1993	TL3773701167; 51°41′33″N 0°00′31″W	1140098	Ministry of Defence Building L157 (group C Incorporating Mills) More images

== Harlow ==
Name	Location	Type	Completed	Date designated	Grid ref. Geo-coordinates	Entry number	Image
Chapel South West of Harlowbury in Grounds	Harlow	Chapel	c1170/1180	5 July 1950	TL4772912056; 51°47′16″N 0°08′26″E	1111694	Chapel South West of Harlowbury in Grounds More images
Church of St Andrew	Netteswellbury Farm, Harlow	Church/Learning Centre	13th century	5 July 1950	TL4561109349; 51°45′50″N 0°06′31″E	1111692	Church of St Andrew More images
Church of St Mary the Virgin	Latton, Harlow	Parish church	12th century	5 July 1950	TL4640410881; 51°46′39″N 0°07′15″E	1337049	Church of St Mary the Virgin More images
Church of St Mary the Virgin	Great Parndon, Harlow	Church	15th century	5 July 1950	TL4323908906; 51°45′38″N 0°04′27″E	1337051	Church of St Mary the Virgin More images
Harlowbury	Harlow	Abbots summer palace	13th century	16 June 1977	TL4774512096; 51°47′17″N 0°08′26″E	1306455	Harlowbury

== Maldon ==
Name	Location	Type	Completed	Date designated	Grid ref. Geo-coordinates	Entry number	Image
Chapel of St Peter-on-the-Wall	Bradwell-on-Sea, Maldon	Chapel	Anglo-Saxon	30 December 1959	TM0310008160; 51°44′07″N 0°56′24″E	1110942	Chapel of St Peter-on-the-Wall More images
Church of St Peter	Goldhanger, Maldon	Parish church	11th century	30 December 1959	TL9051408842; 51°44′45″N 0°45′30″E	1111097	Church of St Peter More images
Church of St Andrew	Heybridge, Maldon	Parish church	12th century	2 October 1951	TL8556808084; 51°44′27″N 0°41′11″E	1256311	Church of St Andrew More images
Church of St Nicholas	Little Braxted, Maldon	Parish church	12th century	30 December 1959	TL8356114714; 51°48′03″N 0°39′39″E	1111066	Church of St Nicholas More images
Church of All Saints	Little Totham, Maldon	Parish church	12th century	30 December 1959	TL8841210322; 51°45′36″N 0°43′43″E	1308792	Church of All Saints More images
Beeleigh Abbey and attached Wall	Maldon, Maldon	Abbey	Founded c1180	2 October 1951	TL8400807721; 51°44′17″N 0°39′49″E	1257150	Beeleigh Abbey and attached Wall More images
Church of All Saints	Maldon, Maldon	Parish church	13th century to 15th century	2 October 1951	TL8493507072; 51°43′55″N 0°40′36″E	1256816	Church of All Saints More images
Church of St Mary	Maldon, Maldon	Parish church	12th century	2 October 1951	TL8569006752; 51°43′43″N 0°41′15″E	1257075	Church of St Mary More images
Moot Hall	Maldon, Maldon	House	1500 to 1576	2 October 1951	TL8498107046; 51°43′54″N 0°40′38″E	1256887	Moot Hall More images
Plume Library, including Tower of former Church of St Peter	Maldon, Maldon	Public Library	c.1699	2 October 1951	TL8509207055; 51°43′54″N 0°40′44″E	1256632	Plume Library, including Tower of former Church of St Peter More images
St Giles Hospital, Remains	Maldon, Maldon	Chapel	Late 12th century	2 October 1951	TL8433206479; 51°43′36″N 0°40′03″E	1256378	St Giles Hospital, Remains More images
Redundant Church of St Mary	Mundon, Maldon	Parish church	14th century and later	1 November 1953	TL8797302655; 51°41′28″N 0°43′06″E	1306956	Redundant Church of St Mary More images
Parish Church of All Saints	Purleigh, Maldon	Parish church	Before 14th century	1 November 1953	TL8413702035; 51°41′13″N 0°39′45″E	1110882	Parish Church of All Saints More images
Church of St Nicholas	Tolleshunt D'Arcy, Maldon	Parish church	Late 14th century	30 December 1959	TL9282111702; 51°46′15″N 0°47′36″E	1328214	Church of St Nicholas More images
Church of St Nicholas	Tolleshunt Major, Maldon	Parish church	12th century	30 December 1959	TL9087511115; 51°45′58″N 0°45′53″E	1142488	Church of St Nicholas More images

== Rochford ==
Name	Location	Type	Completed	Date designated	Grid ref. Geo-coordinates	Entry number	Image
Rochford Hall and ruins	Rochford, Rochford District	House	16th century	4 December 1951	TQ8706890336; 51°34′51″N 0°41′55″E	1112586	Rochford Hall and ruins More images

== Southend-on-Sea ==
Name	Location	Type	Completed	Date designated	Grid ref. Geo-coordinates	Entry number	Image
Church of St Laurence and All Saints	Eastwood, Southend-on-Sea	Church	12th century	23 November 1951	TQ8616488842; 51°34′04″N 0°41′05″E	1322331	Church of St Laurence and All Saints More images
Church of St Mary	Prittlewell, Southend-on-Sea	Church	12th century	23 November 1951	TQ8768286822; 51°32′57″N 0°42′20″E	1322353	Church of St Mary More images
Porters (Civic House)	Prittlewell, Southend-on-Sea	Manor House	Late 15th century or early 16th century	23 November 1951	TQ8861085837; 51°32′24″N 0°43′06″E	1112724	Porters (Civic House) More images
Prittlewell Priory	Prittlewell, Southend-on-Sea	Priory	12th century	23 November 1951	TQ8764587336; 51°33′13″N 0°42′19″E	1112719	Prittlewell Priory More images
Southchurch Hall	Southchurch, Southend-on-Sea	Cross Wing House	13th century	23 November 1951	TQ8939885523; 51°32′13″N 0°43′46″E	1306880	Southchurch Hall More images

== Tendring ==
Name	Location	Type	Completed	Date designated	Grid ref. Geo-coordinates	Entry number	Image
Church of All Saints	Brightlingsea, Tendring	Church	BY 1590	18 July 1949	TM0771418732; 51°49′43″N 1°00′47″E	1337182	Church of All Saints More images
Jacobes Hall	Brightlingsea, Tendring	House	C15/C16	18 July 1949	TM0887016746; 51°48′37″N 1°01′43″E	1111438	Jacobes Hall More images
Church of St Anne and St Lawrence	Elmstead, Tendring	Parish church	12th century	17 November 1966	TM0650626003; 51°53′39″N 0°59′59″E	1337162	Church of St Anne and St Lawrence More images
Church of St Mary	Great Bentley, Tendring	Parish church	1130–40	17 November 1966	TM1090921644; 51°51′13″N 1°03′40″E	1306652	Church of St Mary More images
Church of St George	Great Bromley, Tendring	Parish church	14th century	17 November 1966	TM0836026292; 51°53′46″N 1°01′37″E	1337189	Church of St George More images
Parish Church of All Saints	Great Oakley, Tendring	Church	12th century	30 January 1987	TM1878227318; 51°54′05″N 1°10′44″E	1147170	Parish Church of All Saints More images
Guildhall	Harwich, Tendring	Prison	Late 18th century	25 September 1951	TM2605632584; 51°56′45″N 1°17′16″E	1298482	Guildhall More images
Church of St Mary	Lawford, Tendring	Parish church	14th century	17 November 1966	TM0890331571; 51°56′36″N 1°02′17″E	1261462	Church of St Mary More images
Lawford Hall	Lawford, Tendring	House	Earlier	21 February 1950	TM0877031803; 51°56′44″N 1°02′10″E	1254131	Lawford Hall More images
Church of St Mary	Little Bentley, Tendring	Parish church	12th century	17 November 1966	TM1226424938; 51°52′57″N 1°04′58″E	1111455	Church of St Mary More images
Mistley Towers, North West Tower	Mistley, Tendring	Tower	c.1735	17 November 1966	TM1158831982; 51°56′46″N 1°04′38″E	1240390	Mistley Towers, North West Tower More images
Mistley Towers, South East Tower	Mistley, Tendring	Tower	c.1735	17 November 1966	TM1160831972; 51°56′46″N 1°04′39″E	1261061	Mistley Towers, South East Tower More images
Parish Church of St Michael	Ramsey and Parkeston, Tendring	Church	Early 12th century	30 January 1987	TM2181430438; 51°55′42″N 1°13′29″E	1112103	Parish Church of St Michael More images
Church of St Peter and St Paul	St Osyth, Tendring	Parish church	12th century	17 November 1966	TM1227315576; 51°47′55″N 1°04′38″E	1111513	Church of St Peter and St Paul More images
St Clere's Hall	St Clere's Lane, St Osyth, Tendring	House	16th century	29 April 1952	TM1268114840; 51°47′30″N 1°04′57″E	1309039	St Clere's Hall More images
St Osyth's Priory: The Abbot's Lodging and South Wing, the Darcy Clock Tower and C18 House (formerly listed as the Convalescent Home).	St Osyth, Tendring	Abbey	c1527 Before 1539	21 February 1950	TM1211415747; 51°48′00″N 1°04′30″E	1337158	St Osyth's Priory: The Abbot's Lodging and South Wing, the Darcy Clock Tower and C18 House (formerly listed as the Convalescent Home). More images
St Osyth's Priory Precinct Wall to South West of Gatehouse	St Osyth, Tendring	Wall	20th century	21 February 1950	TM1210415618; 51°47′56″N 1°04′29″E	1337160	St Osyth's Priory Precinct Wall to South West of Gatehouse More images
St Osyth's Priory Ruined East Range and Tower	St Osyth, Tendring	Abbey Ruins	16th century	21 February 1950	TM1219715738; 51°48′00″N 1°04′34″E	1337159	St Osyth's Priory Ruined East Range and Tower More images
St Osyth's Priory the Chapel of St Osyth and Ruins Attached to North	St Osyth, Tendring	Chapel	C19/C20	21 February 1950	TM1217915718; 51°47′59″N 1°04′33″E	1166377	Upload Photo
St Osyth's Priory the Darcy Tower (also known ss Abbot's Tower) and Vaulting to West	St Osyth, Tendring	Tower	c1427 Before 1539	21 February 1950	TM1217615718; 51°47′59″N 1°04′33″E	1146545	St Osyth's Priory the Darcy Tower (also known ss Abbot's Tower) and Vaulting to West More images
St Osyth's Priory, Barn adjoining the West Range of Gatehouse	St Osyth, Tendring	Barn	1986	21 February 1950	TM1207115639; 51°47′57″N 1°04′27″E	1308972	St Osyth's Priory, Barn adjoining the West Range of Gatehouse More images
St Osyth's Priory, Gatehouse and East and West Flanking Ranges	St Osyth, Tendring	Gatehouse	c1527 Before 1539	21 February 1950	TM1212415634; 51°47′57″N 1°04′30″E	1111495	St Osyth's Priory, Gatehouse and East and West Flanking Ranges More images
Church of St John the Baptist	Great Clacton, Tendring	Parish church	12th century	4 July 1986	TM1770816529; 51°48′18″N 1°09′23″E	1317259	Church of St John the Baptist More images

== Thurrock ==
Name	Location	Type	Completed	Date designated	Grid ref. Geo-coordinates	Entry number	Image
Church of St Clement	West Thurrock, Thurrock	Church	c.1200	8 February 1960	TQ5931377298; 51°28′20″N 0°17′33″E	1147660	Church of St Clement More images
Church of St Giles and All Saints	Orsett, Thurrock	Church	12th century	8 February 1960	TQ6444081971; 51°30′46″N 0°22′06″E	1147049	Church of St Giles and All Saints More images
Church of St Katherine	East Tilbury, Thurrock	Church	12th century	8 February 1960	TQ6890776964; 51°27′59″N 0°25′49″E	1337129	Church of St Katherine More images
Church of St Margaret of Antioch	Stanford-le-Hope, Thurrock	Church	12th century	8 February 1960	TQ6843882264; 51°30′51″N 0°25′34″E	1111653	Church of St Margaret of Antioch More images
Church of St Mary	Bulphan, Thurrock	Church	Late 15th century	8 February 1960	TQ6367885834; 51°32′52″N 0°21′33″E	1111617	Church of St Mary More images
Church of St Mary	Corringham, Thurrock	Church	11th century	8 February 1960	TQ7098683289; 51°31′21″N 0°27′48″E	1337083	Church of St Mary More images
Church of St Mary	Chadwell St Mary, Thurrock	Church	Early 12th century	8 February 1960	TQ6462778498; 51°28′53″N 0°22′10″E	1111576	Church of St Mary More images
Church of St Mary the Virgin	Stifford, Thurrock	Church	12th century	8 February 1960	TQ6045480308; 51°29′56″N 0°18′37″E	1111611	Church of St Mary the Virgin More images
Church of St Michael	Fobbing, Thurrock	Church	11th century	8 February 1960	TQ7180183898; 51°31′40″N 0°28′31″E	1146807	Church of St Michael More images
Church of St Michael	Aveley, Thurrock	Church	12th century	8 February 1960	TQ5675880088; 51°29′53″N 0°15′25″E	1337099	Church of St Michael More images
Church of St Nicholas	South Ockendon, Thurrock	Church	12th century	8 February 1960	TQ5950082908; 51°31′21″N 0°17′52″E	1111564	Church of St Nicholas More images
Church of St Peter and St Paul	Horndon on the Hill, Thurrock	Church	13th century	8 February 1960	TQ6692583298; 51°31′26″N 0°24′17″E	1337109	Church of St Peter and St Paul More images
Government Powder Magazine	Purfleet, Thurrock	Powder Magazine	1763 to 1765	10 November 1981	TQ5488478518; 51°29′04″N 0°13′45″E	1166258	Government Powder Magazine More images

== Uttlesford ==
Name	Location	Type	Completed	Date designated	Grid ref. Geo-coordinates	Entry number	Image
Church of All Saints	Church End, Ashdon, Uttlesford	Church	C14-C15	21 February 1967	TL5809941507; 52°02′58″N 0°18′15″E	1170162	Church of All Saints More images
Church of St Nicholas	Berden, Uttlesford	Church	Saxon	21 February 1967	TL4676929630; 51°56′45″N 0°08′02″E	1170264	Church of St Nicholas More images
Church of St Mary the Virgin	Chickney, Uttlesford	Church	late C10-early 11th century	20 February 1967	TL5742628049; 51°55′43″N 0°17′17″E	1112190	Church of St Mary the Virgin More images
Church of the Holy Trinity	Chrishall, Uttlesford	Church	C12-C13	21 February 1967	TL4513938634; 52°01′38″N 0°06′51″E	1112444	Church of the Holy Trinity More images
Church of St Mary and St Clement	Clavering, Uttlesford	Church	Earlier	21 February 1967	TL4707531812; 51°57′55″N 0°08′22″E	1170753	Church of St Mary and St Clement More images
Church of St Mary and All Saints	Debden Park, Debden, Uttlesford	Church	c.1220	21 February 1967	TL5510233229; 51°58′33″N 0°15′24″E	1170838	Church of St Mary and All Saints More images
Church of St Mary the Virgin	Elsenham, Uttlesford	Church	Saxon	21 February 1967	TL5422825924; 51°54′38″N 0°14′27″E	1112335	Church of St Mary the Virgin More images
Church of the Holy Cross	Felsted, Uttlesford	Church	Early 12th century	20 February 1967	TL6765320387; 51°51′25″N 0°25′59″E	1112864	Church of the Holy Cross More images
Gatehouse Farmhouse	Gransmore Green, Felsted, Uttlesford	Cross Wing House	c.1300	20 October 1977	TL6944222577; 51°52′34″N 0°27′36″E	1112849	Upload Photo
Leez Priory Garden Wall	Felsted, Uttlesford	Gate	1537	20 February 1967	TL7003018494; 51°50′21″N 0°28′00″E	1322296	Leez Priory Garden Wall More images
Old School Room and Lych Gate and Building to West	Felsted, Uttlesford	Jettied house	C14-C15	7 February 1952	TL6765420362; 51°51′24″N 0°25′59″E	1146621	Old School Room and Lych Gate and Building to West More images
The Inner Gatehouse at Leez Priory	Felsted, Uttlesford	Augustinian Monastery	1536	19 June 1975	TL7006718548; 51°50′23″N 0°28′02″E	1122138	The Inner Gatehouse at Leez Priory More images
Parish Church of St Mary	Church End, Great Canfield, Uttlesford	Parish church	Early 12th century	23 February 1967	TL5939218007; 51°50′17″N 0°18′44″E	1120855	Parish Church of St Mary More images
Church of All Saints	Great Chesterford, Uttlesford	Church	13th century	21 February 1967	TL5059742767; 52°03′46″N 0°11′43″E	1171461	Church of All Saints More images
Parish Church of St Mary the Virgin	Church End, Great Dunmow, Uttlesford	Parish church	13th century	20 February 1967	TL6295322963; 51°52′53″N 0°21′58″E	1142471	Parish Church of St Mary the Virgin More images
The Clock House	Great Dunmow, Uttlesford	House	Early 17th century	7 February 1952	TL6266022759; 51°52′47″N 0°21′42″E	1098272	The Clock House
Church of St Michael	Great Sampford, Uttlesford	Church	Late 13th century	21 February 1967	TL6423435355; 51°59′32″N 0°23′26″E	1322547	Church of St Michael More images
Church of St Botolph	Hadstock, Uttlesford	Church	Early Anglo-Saxon	21 February 1967	TL5588144744; 52°04′45″N 0°16′24″E	1112250	Church of St Botolph More images
Church of St Mary the Virgin	Church Yard, Hatfield Broad Oak, Uttlesford	Church	1135	20 February 1967	TL5467216625; 51°49′37″N 0°14′35″E	1186272	Church of St Mary the Virgin More images
Church of St Mary the Virgin	Henham, Uttlesford	Church	Early 13th century	21 February 1967	TL5444628589; 51°56′04″N 0°14′42″E	1278434	Church of St Mary the Virgin More images
Parish Church of St Mary	High Easter, Uttlesford	Church	13th century	20 February 1967	TL6200714740; 51°48′28″N 0°20′55″E	1308549	Parish Church of St Mary More images
Porters Farmhouse	High Roding, Uttlesford	Farmhouse	1967	20 February 1967	TL6060717009; 51°49′43″N 0°19′45″E	1141279	Upload Photo
Church of St Katharine	Little Bardfield, Uttlesford	Parish church	Saxon	20 February 1967	TL6554630744; 51°57′02″N 0°24′27″E	1306257	Church of St Katharine More images
The Manor	Little Chesterford, Uttlesford	House	c.1200	26 November 1951	TL5148841696; 52°03′11″N 0°12′29″E	1231793	The Manor More images
Church of St Mary the Virgin	Little Dunmow, Uttlesford	Parish church	19th century	20 February 1967	TL6561221231; 51°51′54″N 0°24′14″E	1307038	Church of St Mary the Virgin More images
Church of St Mary the Virgin	Little Easton, Uttlesford	Parish church	12th century	20 February 1967	TL6045423503; 51°53′13″N 0°19′48″E	1097465	Church of St Mary the Virgin More images
Church of St Mary the Virgin	Little Sampford, Uttlesford	Church	Early 14th century	21 February 1967	TL6531133657; 51°58′36″N 0°24′20″E	1277381	Church of St Mary the Virgin More images
Church of the Holy Trinity	Littlebury, Uttlesford	Church	Saxo-Norman	21 February 1967	TL5169439486; 52°01′59″N 0°12′36″E	1231285	Church of the Holy Trinity More images
Parish Church of St Margaret	Margaret Roding, Uttlesford	Parish church	Late 12th century	20 February 1967	TL5989711997; 51°47′02″N 0°19′00″E	1141258	Parish Church of St Margaret More images
Church of St Mary the Virgin	Newport, Uttlesford	Church	1220–40	21 February 1967	TL5207134107; 51°59′05″N 0°12′47″E	1275990	Church of St Mary the Virgin More images
Quendon Hall	Quendon Park, Quendon and Rickling, Uttlesford	House	C16-C17	26 November 1951	TL5153631841; 51°57′52″N 0°12′15″E	1217140	Quendon Hall
Audley End House	Audley End, Saffron Walden, Uttlesford	Abbey	1538	1 November 1972	TL5246738150; 52°01′15″N 0°13′14″E	1196114	Audley End House More images
Audley End Stables	Audley End Park, Littlebury, Uttlesford	Stable	Late 16th century	22 February 1980	TL5218838268; 52°01′19″N 0°13′00″E	1278179	Audley End Stables More images
Bridge over the River Cam at Tl 521 380, South West of Audley End House	Audley End, Saffron Walden, Uttlesford	Bridge	1763–64	28 November 1951	TL5218338022; 52°01′11″N 0°12′59″E	1196115	Bridge over the River Cam at Tl 521 380, South West of Audley End House More images
Tea House and Bridge at Tl 522 385, North West of Audley End House	Audley End, Saffron Walden, Uttlesford	Bridge	1783	1 November 1972	TL5229338534; 52°01′28″N 0°13′06″E	1297800	Tea House and Bridge at Tl 522 385, North West of Audley End House More images
Church of St Mary the Virgin	Saffron Walden, Uttlesford	Cross	Anglo-Saxon	28 November 1951	TL5373638626; 52°01′29″N 0°14′21″E	1196237	Church of St Mary the Virgin More images
Saint Mark's College	Saffron Walden, Uttlesford	Estate Cottage	1605–14	28 November 1951	TL5248337738; 52°01′02″N 0°13′14″E	1196246	Saint Mark's College More images
Walden Castle	Saffron Walden, Uttlesford	Castle	Late 11th century or early 12th century	28 November 1951	TL5390738722; 52°01′32″N 0°14′31″E	1297737	Walden Castle More images
Youth Hostel	Saffron Walden, Uttlesford	House	c.1520–25	1 November 1972	TL5357238618; 52°01′29″N 0°14′13″E	1297805	Youth Hostel More images
25 and 27 Church Street	Saffron Walden, Uttlesford	House	17th century	28 November 1951	TL5379838572; 52°01′27″N 0°14′25″E	1196155	25 and 27 Church Street More images
17 Market Hill	Saffron Walden, Uttlesford	Hall House	14th century	28 November 1951	TL5381838582; 52°01′28″N 0°14′26″E	1196218	17 Market Hill More images
29 and 31 Castle Street (Sun Inn)	Saffron Walden, Uttlesford	Inn	16th century	28 November 1951	TL5365838665; 52°01′30″N 0°14′17″E	1205611	29 and 31 Castle Street (Sun Inn) More images
St Aylotts	Sewards End, Uttlesford	House	c.1500	28 November 1951	TL5695539918; 52°02′08″N 0°17′12″E	1196110	Upload Photo
Church of St Mary the Virgin	Stebbing, Uttlesford	Church	c.1360	20 February 1967	TL6639424004; 51°53′23″N 0°25′00″E	1112777	Church of St Mary the Virgin More images
Church of St Mary the Virgin	Strethall, Uttlesford	Church	Saxon	21 February 1967	TL4854839827; 52°02′13″N 0°09′51″E	1275078	Church of St Mary the Virgin More images
Church of the Holy Trinity	Takeley, Uttlesford	Church	12th century	20 February 1967	TL5552221673; 51°52′19″N 0°15′28″E	1168843	Church of the Holy Trinity More images
Warish Hall and Moat Bridge	Takeley, Uttlesford	Aisled House	Late 13th century	10 September 1981	TL5683322098; 51°52′31″N 0°16′37″E	1169063	Warish Hall and Moat Bridge
Church of St John the Baptist	Thaxted, Uttlesford	Church	c.1340	20 February 1967	TL6104431014; 51°57′15″N 0°20′32″E	1112151	Church of St John the Baptist More images
Clarence House	Thaxted, Uttlesford	House	1715	20 February 1967	TL6105531059; 51°57′17″N 0°20′32″E	1166193	Clarence House More images
Garden Wall to Clarence House Fronting Bell Lane and Margaret Street	Thaxted, Uttlesford	Gate Pier	1715	28 June 1983	TL6107131085; 51°57′18″N 0°20′33″E	1322228	Garden Wall to Clarence House Fronting Bell Lane and Margaret Street
Guildhall	Thaxted, Uttlesford	Guildhall	between 1390 and 1410	20 February 1967	TL6113930953; 51°57′13″N 0°20′37″E	1112905	Guildhall More images
Horham Hall	Thaxted, Uttlesford	Country house	Early 16th century	7 February 1952	TL5885429432; 51°56′27″N 0°18′34″E	1165290	Horham Hall More images
Horham Hall	Thaxted, Uttlesford	House	c.1470	7 February 1952	TL5884929419; 51°56′26″N 0°18′34″E	1322572	Horham Hall More images
2 Stoney Lane	Thaxted, Uttlesford	Jettied house	c.1410	20 February 1967	TL6112830957; 51°57′14″N 0°20′36″E	1166022	2 Stoney Lane More images
3 Stoney Lane	Thaxted, Uttlesford	Jettied house	c.1410	20 February 1967	TL6112530959; 51°57′14″N 0°20′36″E	1112934	3 Stoney Lane More images
4 Stoney Lane	Thaxted, Uttlesford	Jettied house	c.1410	20 February 1967	TL6112230961; 51°57′14″N 0°20′36″E	1322240	4 Stoney Lane More images
Church of St Mary the Virgin	Tilty, Uttlesford	Church	c.1200	20 February 1967	TL5999126511; 51°54′51″N 0°19′29″E	1169090	Church of St Mary the Virgin More images
Church of St Mary the Virgin	Wendens Ambo, Uttlesford	Church	Norman	21 February 1967	TL5129236390; 52°00′19″N 0°12′10″E	1238157	Church of St Mary the Virgin More images
Barn to South West of Colville Hall	White Roding, Uttlesford	Barn	13th century	13 June 1983	TL5534513402; 51°47′52″N 0°15′05″E	1322691	Upload Photo
Stable to West of Colville Hall	White Roding, Uttlesford	Jettied house	Early 16th century	7 February 1952	TL5533313434; 51°47′53″N 0°15′04″E	1147675	Upload Photo
Barn to North West of Prior's Hall	Widdington, Uttlesford	Barn	1976–77	26 November 1951	TL5369431790; 51°57′48″N 0°14′08″E	1238474	Barn to North West of Prior's Hall More images
Prior's Hall	Widdington, Uttlesford	House	17th century	26 November 1951	TL5372631755; 51°57′47″N 0°14′10″E	1274214	Upload Photo
Church of All Saints	Wimbish, Uttlesford	Church	Early 12th century	21 February 1967	TL5902736907; 52°00′28″N 0°18′56″E	1274068	Church of All Saints More images
Tiptofts	Cole End, Wimbish, Uttlesford	House	16th century	26 November 1951	TL5696937393; 52°00′46″N 0°17′09″E	1274093	Upload Photo

== See also ==
- Category:Grade I listed buildings in Essex
- Grade II* listed buildings in Essex
