= Listed buildings in Sible Hedingham =

Civil Parish in Essex, England

Sible Hedingham is a village and civil parish in the Braintree District of Essex, England. It contains 123 listed buildings that are recorded in the National Heritage List for England. Of these four are grade II* and 119 are grade II.

This list is based on the information retrieved online from Historic England.

== Key ==
Grade	Criteria
I	Buildings that are of exceptional interest
II*	Particularly important buildings of more than special interest
II	Buildings that are of special interest

== Listing ==
Name	Grade	Location	Type	Completed (Note: The date given is the date used by Historic England as significant for the initial building or that of an important part in the structure's description.)	Date designated	Grid ref. (Note: The grid reference is based on the British national grid reference system, sometimes known as OSGB36, used by the Ordnance Survey.) Geo-coordinates	Notes	Entry number (Note: The "List Entry Number" is a unique number assigned to each listed building and scheduled monument by Historic England.)	Image	Wikidata
Little Acre, Pump Approximately 4 Metres East of Cottage	II				15 October 1984	TL7768133360; 51°58′13″N 0°35′07″E	19th century cast-iron pump	1122898	Upload Photo	Q26416003
Mudpluggers Motorcycles and Adjoining House	II	1 and 3, Alderford Street			21 June 1962	TL7829733783; 51°58′26″N 0°35′40″E		1338090	Upload Photo	Q26622436
Baymakers Cottage	II	9 and 11, Alderford Street			21 June 1962	TL7831833790; 51°58′26″N 0°35′41″E		1122885	Upload Photo	Q26415992
13 and 15, Alderford Street	II	13 and 15, Alderford Street			21 June 1962	TL7833133808; 51°58′27″N 0°35′42″E		1338091	Upload Photo	Q26622437
The Old Bakehouse and Adjoining Cottage	II	19 and 21, Alderford Street			21 June 1962	TL7835733826; 51°58′27″N 0°35′43″E		1122886	Upload Photo	Q26415993
41, Alderford Street	II	41, Alderford Street			15 October 1984	TL7839933854; 51°58′28″N 0°35′45″E	Former pair of c.18th/19th century flint cottages	1338092	Upload Photo	Q26622438
St Marys	II	47, Alderford Street			15 October 1984	TL7836333865; 51°58′29″N 0°35′43″E	16th century, possibly earlier, timber framed and plastered house	1122887	Upload Photo	Q26415994
Alderford Grange	II	Alderford Street			21 June 1962	TL7831133686; 51°58′23″N 0°35′40″E		1169769	Upload Photo	Q26462943
Alderford Maltings Barn	II	Alderford Street			8 January 1982	TL7833833713; 51°58′24″N 0°35′42″E		1338093	Upload Photo	Q26622439
Alderford Mill	II*	Alderford Street	mill		21 June 1962	TL7848233918; 51°58′30″N 0°35′50″E		1122888	Alderford Mill More images	Q17557205
Pump Adjacent to North of Number 30	II	Alderford Street			15 October 1984	TL7841233851; 51°58′28″N 0°35′46″E	19th century cast-iron pump	1122889	Upload Photo	Q26415995
Return Wall of Alderford Grange Return Wall of Alderford Grange, Alderford Street to Left the Bell Inn	II	Alderford Street			21 June 1962	TL7831033673; 51°58′23″N 0°35′40″E		1276480	Upload Photo	Q26565989
Searles	II	Alderford Street			15 October 1984	TL7843633866; 51°58′29″N 0°35′47″E		1169804	Upload Photo	Q26462982
Glasscocks	II	Almshouse Green			15 October 1984	TL7587933442; 51°58′18″N 0°33′33″E	17th century, possibly earlier, timber framed with red brick faced cottage	1338094	Upload Photo	Q26622440
Blois Hall	II	Blois Hall			15 October 1984	TL7452634876; 51°59′06″N 0°32′24″E	17th century, possibly earlier, timber framed with 19th century brick facing house	1338081	Upload Photo	Q26622427
Hole Farm, Barn Range to Left (south) of Track and Approximately 500 Metres West of Braintree Road	II	Braintree Road			15 October 1984	TL7827032142; 51°57′33″N 0°35′35″E		1169850	Upload Photo	Q26463025
Oak Tree Barn	II	Braintree Road, Halstead, CO9 3RL			15 October 1984	TL7864432058; 51°57′30″N 0°35′55″E	Late 16th/ early 17th century timber weatherboarded barn	1306330	Upload Photo	Q26593122
Windmill Cottage	II	Braintree Road			15 October 1984	TL7863332369; 51°57′40″N 0°35′55″E	17th century, possibly earlier, timber framed with brick facing	1122890	Upload Photo	Q26415996
1, Church Street	II	1, Church Street			15 October 1984	TL7768434026; 51°58′35″N 0°35′08″E	17th century, possibly earlier, timber framed and rough rendered with weatherboarded plinth house	1306343	Upload Photo	Q26593132
2, Church Street	II	2, Church Street			15 October 1984	TL7770534042; 51°58′35″N 0°35′09″E	17th/ 18th century, possibly earlier, timber framed and plastered house	1122893	Upload Photo	Q26415999
3 and 5, Church Street	II	3 and 5, Church Street			15 October 1984	TL7767834036; 51°58′35″N 0°35′08″E	16th century, possibly earlier timber framed and plastered house	1122891	Upload Photo	Q26415997
The White Lion	II	6, Church Street	pub		15 October 1984	TL7770534067; 51°58′36″N 0°35′09″E		1169912	The White Lion More images	Q26463100
The Croft	II	12, Church Street			15 October 1984	TL7768534084; 51°58′37″N 0°35′08″E		1122894	Upload Photo	Q26416000
Cresswell Farmhouse	II	13, Church Street			21 June 1962	TL7765834069; 51°58′36″N 0°35′07″E	16th/17th century, possibly earlier, timber framed and plastered cottage	1169874	Upload Photo	Q26463048
Tape House	II	14, Church Street			15 October 1984	TL7768634100; 51°58′37″N 0°35′08″E	17th century, possibly earlier, timber framed and plastered cottage	1169922	Upload Photo	Q26463116
18 and 20, Church Street	II	18 and 20, Church Street			15 October 1984	TL7767434113; 51°58′37″N 0°35′08″E		1122895	Upload Photo	Q26416001
33, Church Street	II	33, Church Street			15 October 1984	TL7762634220; 51°58′41″N 0°35′05″E	17th/18th century timber framed and plastered cottage	1338095	Upload Photo	Q26622441
34, 36 and 38, Church Street	II	34, 36 and 38, Church Street			15 October 1984	TL7762834288; 51°58′43″N 0°35′06″E		1169933	Upload Photo	Q26463134
37, Church Street	II	37, Church Street			15 October 1984	TL7762234246; 51°58′42″N 0°35′05″E	17th/18th century timber framed and panel pargetted cottage	1122892	Upload Photo	Q26415998
40, Church Street	II	40, Church Street			15 October 1984	TL7762134305; 51°58′44″N 0°35′05″E	17th century, possibly earlier, timber framed and plastered cottage	1122896	Upload Photo	Q26416002
Church of St Peter	II*	Church Street	church building		21 June 1962	TL7757034363; 51°58′46″N 0°35′03″E		1122897	Church of St Peter More images	Q17557209
The White Horse Inn	II	Church Street			7 August 1952	TL7760334256; 51°58′42″N 0°35′04″E		1169901	Upload Photo	Q26463085
Little Acre	II	Cobbs Fenn			15 October 1984	TL7766033372; 51°58′14″N 0°35′06″E	17th/18th century, possibly earlier, timber framed and plastered cottage	1169959	Upload Photo	Q26463174
Kentish Farm, Cartlodge Adjoining Road and Approximately 20 Metres South East of House	II	Delvin End			15 October 1984	TL7502735306; 51°59′19″N 0°32′51″E		1122899	Upload Photo	Q26416004
Brickpoint Cottage	II	Delvin End			15 October 1984	TL7545235291; 51°59′18″N 0°33′14″E	17th century, possibly earlier, timber framed and parget plastered cottage	1169997	Upload Photo	Q26463234
Bucks Cottage	II	Delvin End			15 October 1984	TL7546335308; 51°59′19″N 0°33′14″E	17th century, possibly earlier, timber framed and plastered cottage	1338096	Upload Photo	Q26622442
Edishe's Farmhouse	II	Delvin End			15 October 1984	TL7572035271; 51°59′17″N 0°33′28″E	17th century, possibly earlier, timber framed and plastered house	1170005	Upload Photo	Q26463249
Kentish Farmhouse	II	Delvin End			21 June 1962	TL7501735330; 51°59′20″N 0°32′51″E		1306272	Upload Photo	Q26593067
Monk's	II	Delvin End			15 October 1984	TL7596135271; 51°59′17″N 0°33′40″E	17th century, possibly earlier, Timber framed and panel plastered house	1122900	Upload Photo	Q26416005
Greys Hall, Enclosing Forecourt Walls and Railings to Churchyard Face and Adjoining Wall	II	Rectory Road			15 October 1984	TL7764634387; 51°58′46″N 0°35′07″E	15th/16th century timber framed weatherboarded barn	1233452	Upload Photo	Q26526919
Willow Farmhouse, Formerly Shelley's Farmhouse	II	Morris Green			15 October 1984	TL7454633972; 51°58′36″N 0°32′24″E	15th century, possibly earlier, timber framed and plastered house	1338080	Upload Photo	Q26622426
Fenner's Farmhouse North of Pepper's Farm Complex	II	Forry's Green			15 October 1984	TL7632932830; 51°57′58″N 0°33′55″E	17th century, possibly earlier timber framed and plastered house	1122901	Upload Photo	Q26416006
Lowt's Cottage	II	Forry's Green			15 October 1984	TL7648033102; 51°58′06″N 0°34′03″E	17th/18th century Timber framed and plastered cottage	1170027	Upload Photo	Q26463279
Halstead Road Cottages	II	1 and 2, Halstead Road			15 October 1984	TL7955732468; 51°57′42″N 0°36′43″E		1338057	Upload Photo	Q26622404
Carters Farm, Barn Approximately 35 Metres West of House	II	High Street Green			15 October 1984	TL7602334544; 51°58′53″N 0°33′42″E	18th century timber framed weatherboarded barn	1338078	Upload Photo	Q26622424
Graves Hall, Barn Approximately 45 Metres North East of Hall	II	High Street Green			15 October 1984	TL7642835207; 51°59′14″N 0°34′05″E		1170040	Upload Photo	Q26463302
Hen and Chickens Public House House, Formerly Hen and Chickens Public House	II	High Street Green			15 October 1984	TL7647934680; 51°58′57″N 0°34′06″E	17th century, possibly earlier, former public house that is timber framed and plastered	1306233	Upload Photo	Q26593034
Village Pump in Centre of Green at T Junction with Delvin End Road	II	High Street Green			15 October 1984	TL7652234700; 51°58′58″N 0°34′09″E	19th century cast-iron pump	1338058	Upload Photo	Q26622405
Washland's Farmhouse	II	High Street Green			15 October 1984	TL7698234636; 51°58′55″N 0°34′33″E	17th century, possibly earlier timber framed and plastered house	1306266	Upload Photo	Q26593062
Washland's Farm, Cartlodge Approximately 30 Metres West of House	II	High Street Green			15 October 1984	TL7694534602; 51°58′54″N 0°34′31″E	18th century Timber weatherboarded Cartlodge	1122902	Upload Photo	Q26416007
Hulls Mill	II	Hulls Mill Road			19 July 1984	TL7927733167; 51°58′05″N 0°36′30″E		1168364	Upload Photo	Q26461621
Baykers Farm, Pump and Pump House Approximately 10 Metres North of House	II	Lamb Lane			15 October 1984	TL7777232916; 51°57′59″N 0°35′11″E	19th or early 20th century pump and pump house	1306219	Upload Photo	Q26593019
Baykers Farmhouse	II	Lamb Lane			21 June 1962	TL7778632916; 51°57′59″N 0°35′11″E	16th century, possibly earlier exposed timber frame with plaster infill house	1338079	Upload Photo	Q26622425
Tower House	II	Lamb Lane			15 October 1984	TL7822233331; 51°58′12″N 0°35′35″E	19th century Red brick house	1170082	Upload Photo	Q26463359
Welcome Slough Farm, Barn Approximately 10 Metres South of House	II	Morris Green			15 October 1984	TL7374133814; 51°58′32″N 0°31′41″E	17th/18th century timber framed weatherboarded barn	1122864	Upload Photo	Q26415973
Redhouse Farm, Cartlodge on Opposite Side of Road and Approximately 40 Metres East of House	II	Morris Green			15 October 1984	TL7485034102; 51°58′40″N 0°32′40″E	18th/19th century timber framed weatherboarded cartlodge	1170142	Upload Photo	Q26463470
Redhouse Farmhouse, Barn on Opposite Side of Road and Approximately 70 Metres East of House	II	Morris Green			8 January 1982	TL7489834152; 51°58′42″N 0°32′43″E	17th century timber framed weatherboarded barn	1122863	Upload Photo	Q26415972
Birdgreen Farmhouse	II	Morris Green			15 October 1984	TL7431734462; 51°58′53″N 0°32′13″E	17th century, possibly earlier, timber framed and plastered cottage	1170124	Upload Photo	Q26463453
Deek's Farmhouse	II	Morris Green			15 October 1984	TL7456633289; 51°58′14″N 0°32′24″E	17th century, possibly earlier, timber framed and rough rendered cottage	1122861	Upload Photo	Q26415970
Morris Green Farmhouse	II	Morris Green			16 October 1981	TL7454933565; 51°58′23″N 0°32′23″E		1170112	Upload Photo	Q26463434
Redhouse Farmhouse	II	Morris Green			8 January 1982	TL7480034119; 51°58′41″N 0°32′37″E	17th century exposed three bay timber frame with plaster infill house	1122862	Upload Photo	Q26415971
Welcome Slough Farmhouse	II	Morris Green			15 October 1984	TL7376933824; 51°58′33″N 0°31′43″E	17th century, possibly earlier, timber framed and plastered house	1170150	Upload Photo	Q26463479
Lamb House	II	2, Potter Street			21 June 1962	TL7837533437; 51°58′15″N 0°35′43″E		1276664	Upload Photo	Q26566161
Clare Cottage Kerry Cottage	II	3, Potter Street			21 June 1962	TL7840333437; 51°58′15″N 0°35′45″E		1306172	Upload Photo	Q26592975
7, Potter Street	II	7, Potter Street			21 June 1962	TL7840633430; 51°58′15″N 0°35′45″E		1338082	Upload Photo	Q26622428
Tokat House	II	9, Potter Street			15 October 1984	TL7842433412; 51°58′14″N 0°35′46″E		1233295	Upload Photo	Q26526770
19 and 21, Potter Street	II	19 and 21, Potter Street			21 June 1962	TL7846033345; 51°58′12″N 0°35′48″E		1233296	Upload Photo	Q26526771
23, Potter Street	II	23, Potter Street			15 October 1984	TL7848033339; 51°58′12″N 0°35′49″E		1276662	Upload Photo	Q26566159
Old House	II	25, Potter Street			21 June 1962	TL7848033321; 51°58′11″N 0°35′49″E		1233297	Upload Photo	Q26526772
27, 29 and 31, Potter Street	II	27, 29 and 31, Potter Street			21 June 1962	TL7849533298; 51°58′10″N 0°35′49″E		1233298	Upload Photo	Q26526773
Grove House Including Attached Forecourt Railings and Gate	II	32, Potter Street			21 June 1962	TL7850033235; 51°58′08″N 0°35′49″E		1233403	Upload Photo	Q26526874
33 and 35, Potter Street	II	33 and 35, Potter Street			21 June 1962	TL7850833281; 51°58′10″N 0°35′50″E	A pair of 18th-century, possibly earlier timber framed and panel pargetted cottages	1233355	Upload Photo	Q26526828
Potter House	II	37, Potter Street			21 June 1962	TL7851733270; 51°58′09″N 0°35′50″E	18th century, possibly earlier, timber framed and panel pargetted house	1233299	Upload Photo	Q26526774
Hawkwood Manor	II	Potter Street			7 August 1952	TL7839533364; 51°58′12″N 0°35′44″E		1233375	Upload Photo	Q26526847
Outbuilding Approximately 10 Metres South East of Number 25	II	Potter Street			15 October 1984	TL7850033315; 51°58′11″N 0°35′50″E	18th century, possibly earlier, timber framed and plastered outbuilding	1233342	Upload Photo	Q26526816
Pump on Verge Opposite Number 19	II	Potter Street			15 October 1984	TL7844733340; 51°58′12″N 0°35′47″E	19th century cast-iron pump	1233300	Upload Photo	Q26526775
The White House	II	Potter Street			21 June 1962	TL7853633165; 51°58′06″N 0°35′51″E		1276665	Upload Photo	Q26566162
Prayors Farm, Barn Adjoining Road and Approximately 35 Metres South West of House	II	Prayors Hill			15 October 1984	TL7750534386; 51°58′46″N 0°34′59″E	17th/18th century timber framed weatherboarded barn	1276666	Upload Photo	Q26566163
Prayors Farm House	II	Prayors Hill			15 October 1984	TL7751434431; 51°58′48″N 0°35′00″E		1233302	Upload Photo	Q26526777
The Old Half Moon	II	22, Queen Street			7 August 1973	TL7863032962; 51°57′59″N 0°35′56″E		1233420	Upload Photo	Q26526890
Wash Farm, Barn Opposite and Approximatley 30 Metres North East of Wash Farm House	II	Queen Street			15 October 1984	TL7863033056; 51°58′02″N 0°35′56″E	16th century timber framed weatherboarded barn	1233419	Upload Photo	Q26526889
41 and 43, Queen Street	II	41 and 43, Queen Street			15 October 1984	TL7865632828; 51°57′55″N 0°35′57″E	Pair of 17th century, possibly earlier. Timber framed and pebble dash plastered	1233418	Upload Photo	Q26526888
Brickwall Farmhouse	II	Queen Street			21 June 1962	TL7858432898; 51°57′57″N 0°35′53″E	16th century, possibly earlier, timber framed house	1233304	Upload Photo	Q26526779
Bridge House Wash Farm House	II	Queen Street			7 August 1952	TL7860233040; 51°58′02″N 0°35′54″E		1276584	Upload Photo	Q26566087
Milestone on East Verge of Road and Adjoining the Garden of Numbers 33 and 35	II	Queen Street			15 October 1984	TL7864132873; 51°57′56″N 0°35′56″E	18th century diamond shaped milestone	1276667	Upload Photo	Q26566164
Greys Hall	II*	23 and 24, Rectory Road			21 June 1962	TL7766034397; 51°58′47″N 0°35′08″E		1276585	Upload Photo	Q17557700
Greys Hall, Barn Approximately 35 Metres North East of House	II	Rectory Road			15 October 1984	TL7768034419; 51°58′47″N 0°35′09″E		1276586	Upload Photo	Q26566088
The Old Rectory, Carriage House Approximately 40 Metres North East of House	II	Rectory Road			15 October 1984	TL7770634288; 51°58′43″N 0°35′10″E	18th/19th century Red brick carriage house	1276587	Upload Photo	Q26566089
Garden Walls and Railings Running from Gate Pier to West of Entrance to the Old Rectory Along South Side of Rectory Road and Along East Side of Church Street to Brook	II	Rectory Road			15 October 1984	TL7764634258; 51°58′42″N 0°35′07″E		1276588	Upload Photo	Q26566090
The Old Rectory	II*	Rectory Road			7 August 1952	TL7766734234; 51°58′41″N 0°35′08″E		1233454	Upload Photo	Q17557692
15 and 17, School Road	II	15 and 17, School Road			15 October 1984	TL7765433892; 51°58′30″N 0°35′06″E	17th/ 18th century timber framed and plastered cottage	1233456	Upload Photo	Q26526922
Primrose Cottage	II	School Road			15 October 1984	TL7770333977; 51°58′33″N 0°35′09″E	18th century, possibly earlier, timber framed and plastered with brick plinth cottage	1276574	Upload Photo	Q26566078
Clay Hall, Barn Approximately 15 Metres North West of House	II	Southey Green			15 October 1984	TL7770931804; 51°57′23″N 0°35′05″E	16th/17th century timber framed and weatherboarded barn	1233529	Upload Photo	Q26526989
Hill Farmhouse	II	Southey Green			21 June 1962	TL7750232084; 51°57′32″N 0°34′55″E	15th century, possibly earlier, timber framed and plastered house	1233468	Upload Photo	Q26526933
Old Off Licence	II	Southey Green			8 January 1982	TL7744732164; 51°57′35″N 0°34′52″E		1233469	Upload Photo	Q26526934
Southey Green Farmhouse	II	Southey Green			7 August 1952	TL7732232338; 51°57′40″N 0°34′46″E		1276593	Upload Photo	Q26566095
The Chase	II	Southey Green			15 October 1984	TL7782931682; 51°57′19″N 0°35′11″E	17th century, possibly earlier Timber framed, part plastered, part brick and weatherboarded house	1233544	Upload Photo	Q26527001
Fiesta Thatch	II	Sugar Lane			15 October 1984	TL7507333242; 51°58′12″N 0°32′50″E	18th/19th century Timber framed, painted brick and flint facing, thatched cottage	1233561	Upload Photo	Q26527017
K6 Telephone Kiosk	II	Swan Chase			26 February 1991	TL7826933719; 51°58′24″N 0°35′38″E		1276400	Upload Photo	Q26565916
The Barn Garage	II	Swan Chase			15 October 1984	TL7822733737; 51°58′25″N 0°35′36″E	16th, possibly 17th century timber framed weatherboarded barn	1233470	Upload Photo	Q26526935
Appletree Lodge	II	9, Swan Street			15 October 1984	TL7833033512; 51°58′17″N 0°35′41″E	17th century, possibly earlier, timber framed and pargetted plastered house	1233578	Upload Photo	Q26527034
The Bays	II	18, Swan Street			15 October 1984	TL7835833560; 51°58′19″N 0°35′43″E		1233590	Upload Photo	Q26527046
Hill House	II	20, Swan Street			15 October 1984	TL7834833585; 51°58′20″N 0°35′42″E	19th century painted brick faced house	1233591	Upload Photo	Q26527047
Websters Almshouses	II	32, 34, 36 and 38, Swan Street, Sible, CO9 3RE			21 June 1962	TL7833233632; 51°58′21″N 0°35′41″E	Six almhouses dating from c.1884	1233677	Upload Photo	Q26527128
Wyngates	II	33, Swan Street			21 June 1962	TL7829033664; 51°58′22″N 0°35′39″E	17th century, possibly earlier house	1276594	Upload Photo	Q26566096
Old Bakery	II	37, Swan Street			21 June 1962	TL7827333673; 51°58′23″N 0°35′38″E	17th century, possibly earlier timber framed and rough rendered house	1233581	Upload Photo	Q26527037
The Swan Inn	II	39, Swan Street	pub		7 August 1952	TL7827033696; 51°58′23″N 0°35′38″E		1233584	The Swan Inn More images	Q26527040
40 and 42, Swan Street	II	40 and 42, Swan Street			21 June 1962	TL7832333650; 51°58′22″N 0°35′41″E		1276536	Upload Photo	Q26566042
Krone House	II	44, Swan Street			15 October 1984	TL7831933660; 51°58′22″N 0°35′41″E	18th/19th century with 17th century core, timber framed, painted brick faced house	1233592	Upload Photo	Q26527048
49, Swan Street	II	49, Swan Street			7 August 1952	TL7826833740; 51°58′25″N 0°35′38″E		1233586	Upload Photo	Q26527042
143, Swan Street	II	143, Swan Street			15 October 1984	TL7812334255; 51°58′42″N 0°35′32″E	17th century, possibly earlier, Timber framed and rough rendered with some red brick facing house	1233588	Upload Photo	Q26527044
Brook House	II	198, Swan Street			19 September 1980	TL7804834503; 51°58′50″N 0°35′28″E		1276538	Upload Photo	Q26566044
Davenants	II	Swan Street			15 October 1984	TL7828633856; 51°58′28″N 0°35′39″E		1233593	Upload Photo	Q26527049
No. 60 (acacia) and Nos. 64-66	II	Swan Street			15 October 1984	TL7827033879; 51°58′29″N 0°35′39″E		1233744	Upload Photo	Q26527193
The Sugar Loaves	II	Swan Street	pub		15 October 1984	TL7796534509; 51°58′50″N 0°35′24″E		1276535	The Sugar Loaves More images	Q26566040
Barr Hall	II	Toppesfield Road			15 October 1984	TL7424935186; 51°59′16″N 0°32′10″E	17th century, possibly earlier, timber framed and plastered house	1233745	Upload Photo	Q26527194
The Cottage	II	Wethersfield Road			15 October 1984	TL7699834060; 51°58′37″N 0°34′32″E	17th/18th century timber framed and plastered cottage	1233595	Upload Photo	Q26527051
Rookwoods, Stable Block Approximately 30 Metres North West of House	II	Yeldham Road			15 October 1984	TL7756634948; 51°59′05″N 0°35′04″E		1233770	Upload Photo	Q26527216
Rookwoods, Small Stable Block Including Attached Kennel and Wall Approximately 50 Metres North West of House	II	Yeldham Road			15 October 1984	TL7753834941; 51°59′04″N 0°35′02″E		1233596	Upload Photo	Q26527052
Coachman's Cottage Rookwoods Cottage	II	Yeldham Road			15 October 1984	TL7768735029; 51°59′07″N 0°35′10″E		1276540	Upload Photo	Q26566046
Rookwoods	II	Yeldham Road			15 October 1984	TL7760934935; 51°59′04″N 0°35′06″E		1276539	Upload Photo	Q26566045
Rookwoods Lodge	II	Yeldham Road			15 October 1984	TL7769234994; 51°59′06″N 0°35′10″E		1276441	Upload Photo	Q26565954

== See also ==
- Grade I listed buildings in Essex
- Grade II* listed buildings in Essex

== Sources ==
- Bettley, James; Pevsner, Nikolaus (2007) [1954], Essex, The Buildings of England, New Haven and London: Yale University Press, ISBN 978-0-300-11614-4
