= Crepping Hall =

English country house

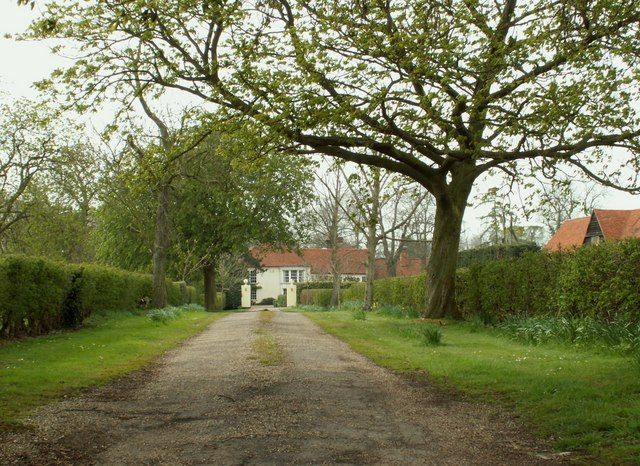
- Interactive map of the Crepping Hall area

General information
- Location: Crepping Hall, Crepping Hall Road, Wakes Colne, Essex
- Coordinates: 51.921°N 0.774°E
- Year built: Late 12th century

Crepping Hall is a historic building in Wakes Colne, Essex. Since 1952, it has been Grade I listed.

== History ==
Crepping Hall was built in the late 12th century on the estates of the de Vere family, who were at that time Earls of Oxford. The original structure was an open timber-framed hall with aisles, of which two and a half bays remain to this day. There are also fragmentary remains of a moat. Later additions to the building included a crosswing at the western end in circa 1512, which would originally have included an attic floor.

Sir Francis Vere was born at Crepping Hall in c. 1560.

A stable block and cottage were added to the east of the hall in the early 19th century; they are now Grade II listed.

Modern additions to Crepping Hall include a tennis court, swimming pool, and orangery. The building is in private ownership with no public access.
