= St John the Baptist Church, Finchingfield =

Church in Finchingfield, North Essex

St John the Baptist Church
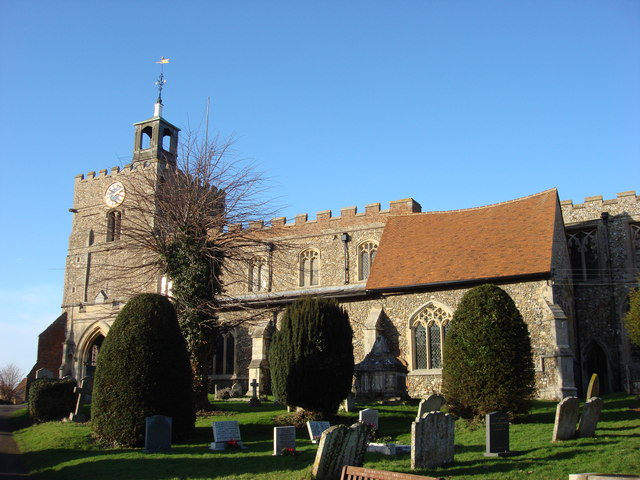
- St John the Baptist Church, Finchingfield
- St John the Baptist Church
- 51.96835°N 0.45318°E
- Location: North Essex
- Country: England
- Denomination: Anglican

Architecture
- Heritage designation: Grade I

Administration
- Province: Canterbury
- Diocese: Chelmsford
- Deanery: Braintree

St John the Baptist Church is an Anglican church in the village of Finchingfield, North Essex. The church was originally built in the 12th century with a nave, chancel, and tower. A major renovation and expansion of the building took place in the late 13th and 14th centuries. The church was restored in the 19th century. There are a few surviving Norman features, including the tower and west doorway. It is a Grade I listed building.

== Description ==
The church is located in the village of Finchingfield, North Essex. It was constructed with flint rubble with limestone and clunch dressings. The church comprises a chancel with two-bay north and south chapels, a nave with a clerestory and five-bay aisles, a 12th-century tower, and a 19th century south porch. The surviving Norman features of the church are the tower, the tower arch and west doorway and the 3-bay arcading at the two corners on the eastern side of the church's interior.

The chancel has a 15th-century piscina. The font is supported by carved angels and quatrefoiled panels with shields of arms decorating each side. There is an early 15th-century oak chancel rood screen and a 14th century screen at the west end of the south chapel. The burial monuments include an altar tomb with black marble slab of Richard Marriot (d. 1703) and an altar tomb with brass inscription to Robert Kempe, (d. 1524). The burial monument of John and Elizabeth Berners (d. mid-1500s) have brass figures of the couple set into a marble slab. They stand facing each other with hands raised in prayer, dressed in heraldic clothing—he in a tabard, she in a mantle.

The east window in the chancel is 19th century. Windows on the north and south walls date to the late 14th century, They both have cinquefoil-shaped windows with tracery set in a pointed arch. The clerestory has restored windows originally dating to the late 14th century. The stone corbels from the late 14th century are carved with heads of saints, a king, a queen, and others. The tower has three levels, a battlemented top, and an 18th-century wooden lantern. The original roofs are lead, while the newer north and south chapels have red clay tile roofs.

== History ==
The original church with nave, chancel, and tower was built in the 12th century. Much of the present structure dates from the late 13th and 14th centuries. The chancel was remodeled in the mid-13th century. The north and south aisles and chapels date from the late 14th century. The west tower dates to the late 12th century and was raised in the 15th century. The tower’s bell chamber was renovated—though it collapsed in the 17th century. A cupola with an open bell stage was added in the 18th century. The south porch was added in the 14th century and rebuilt in the 19th century. The church was restored in the 19th century by architect Henry Stock.

The church was designated a Grade I listed building in 1967.

== Gallery ==
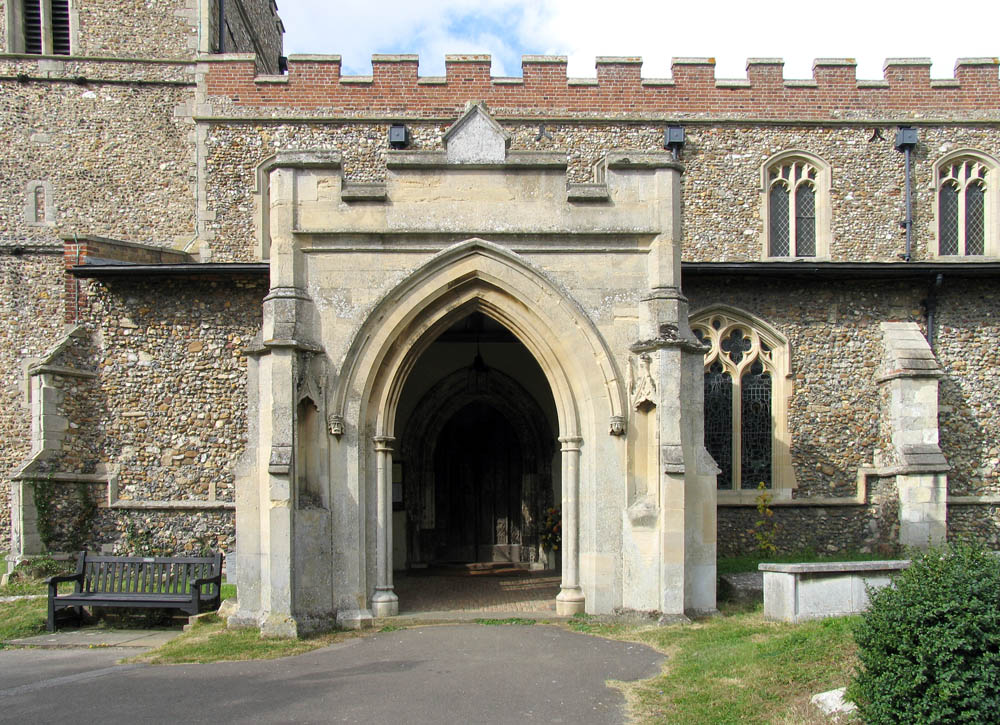
South porch

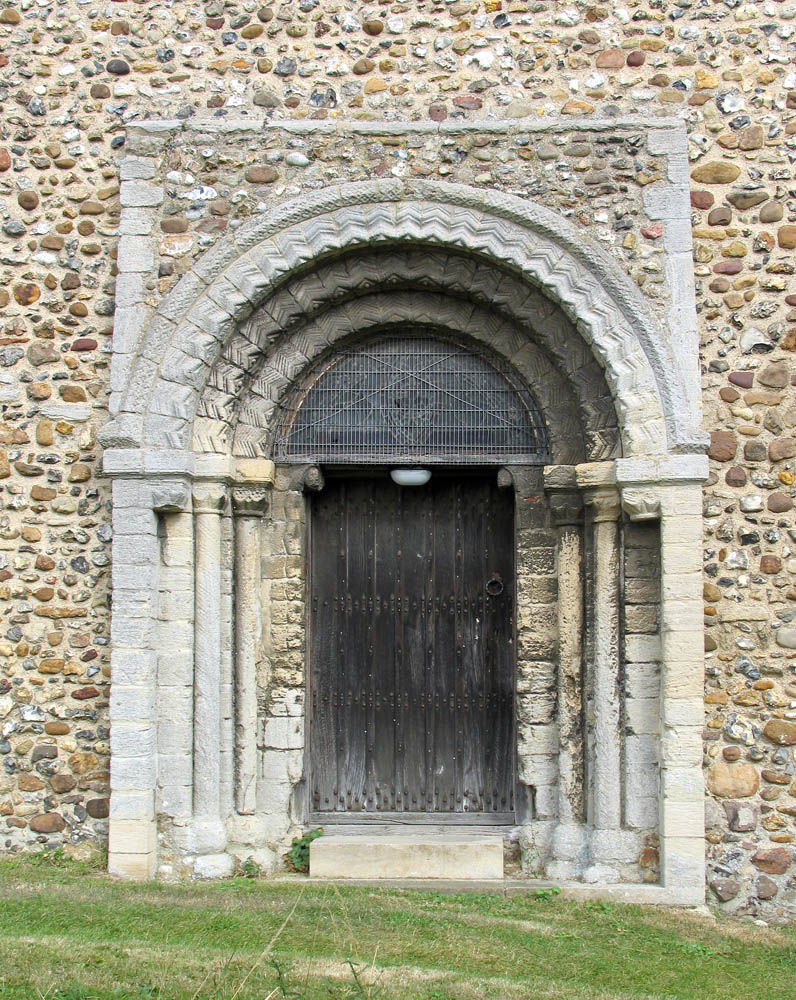
Norman doorway

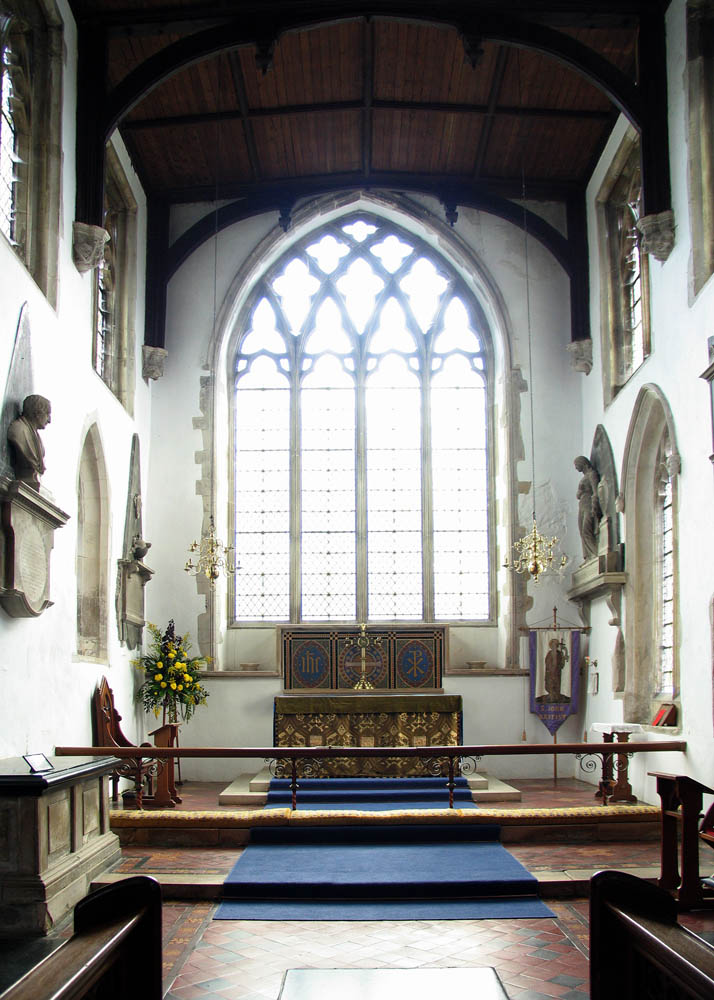
Chancel

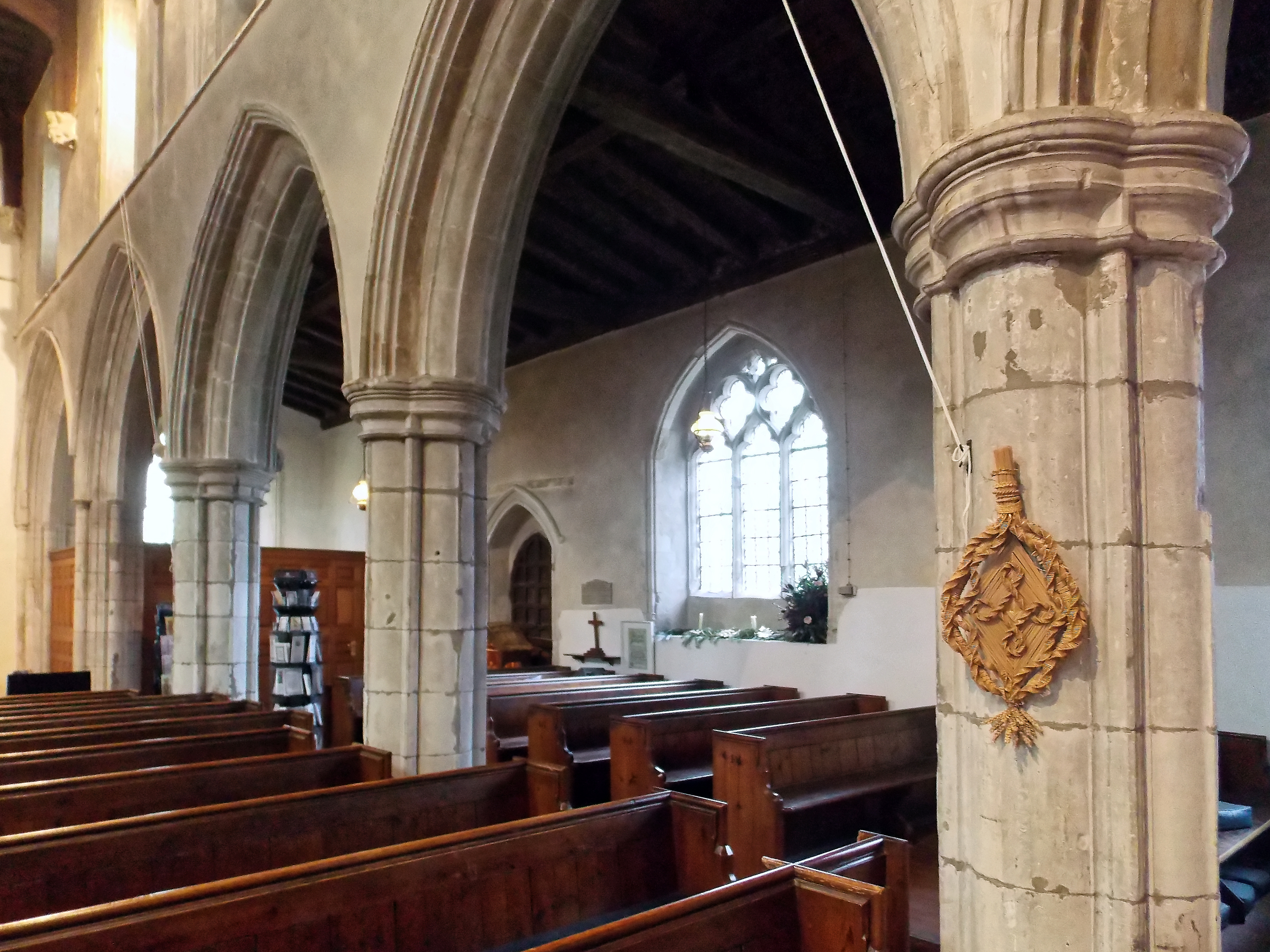
Nave and north aisle

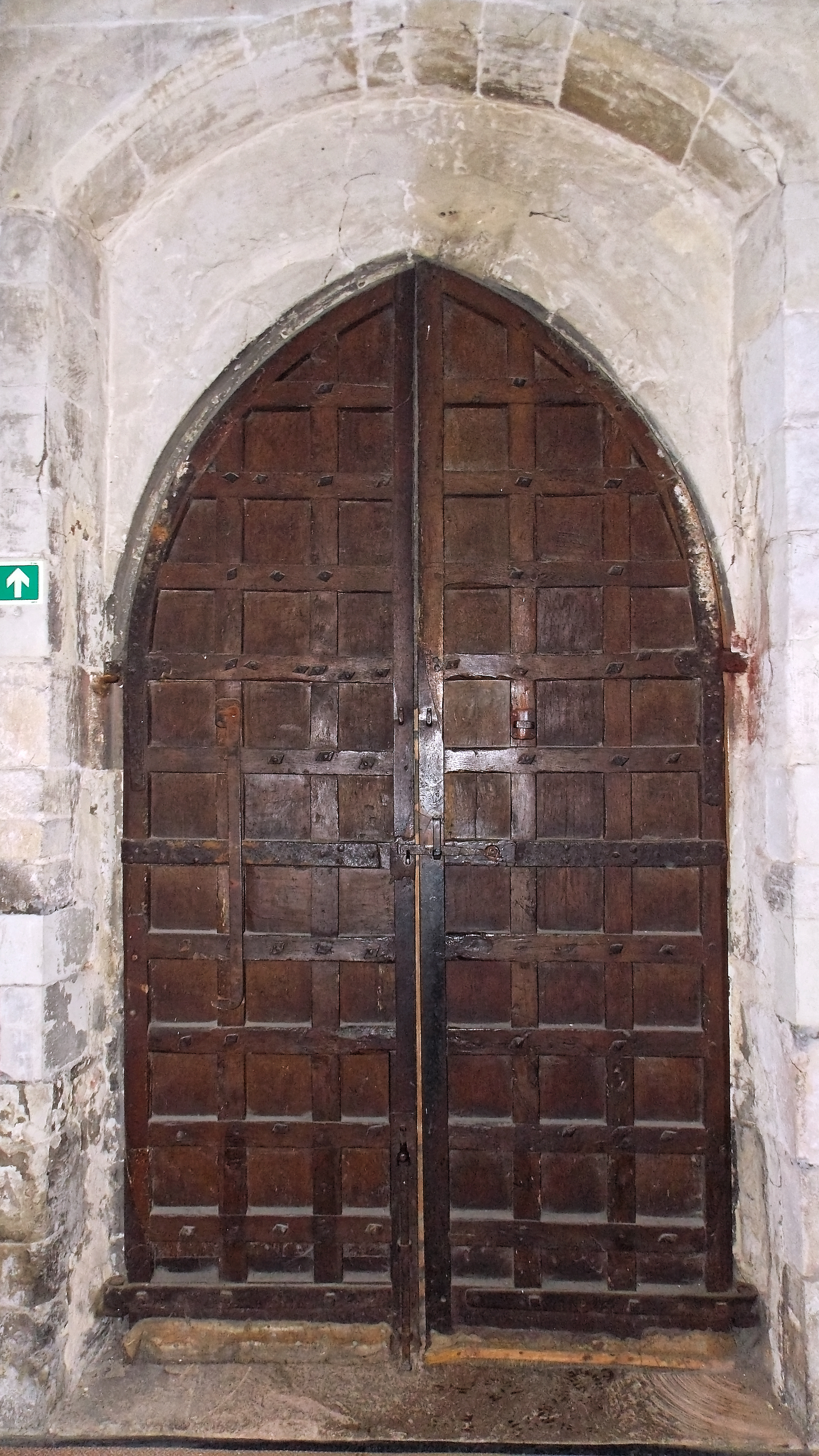
Nave south door

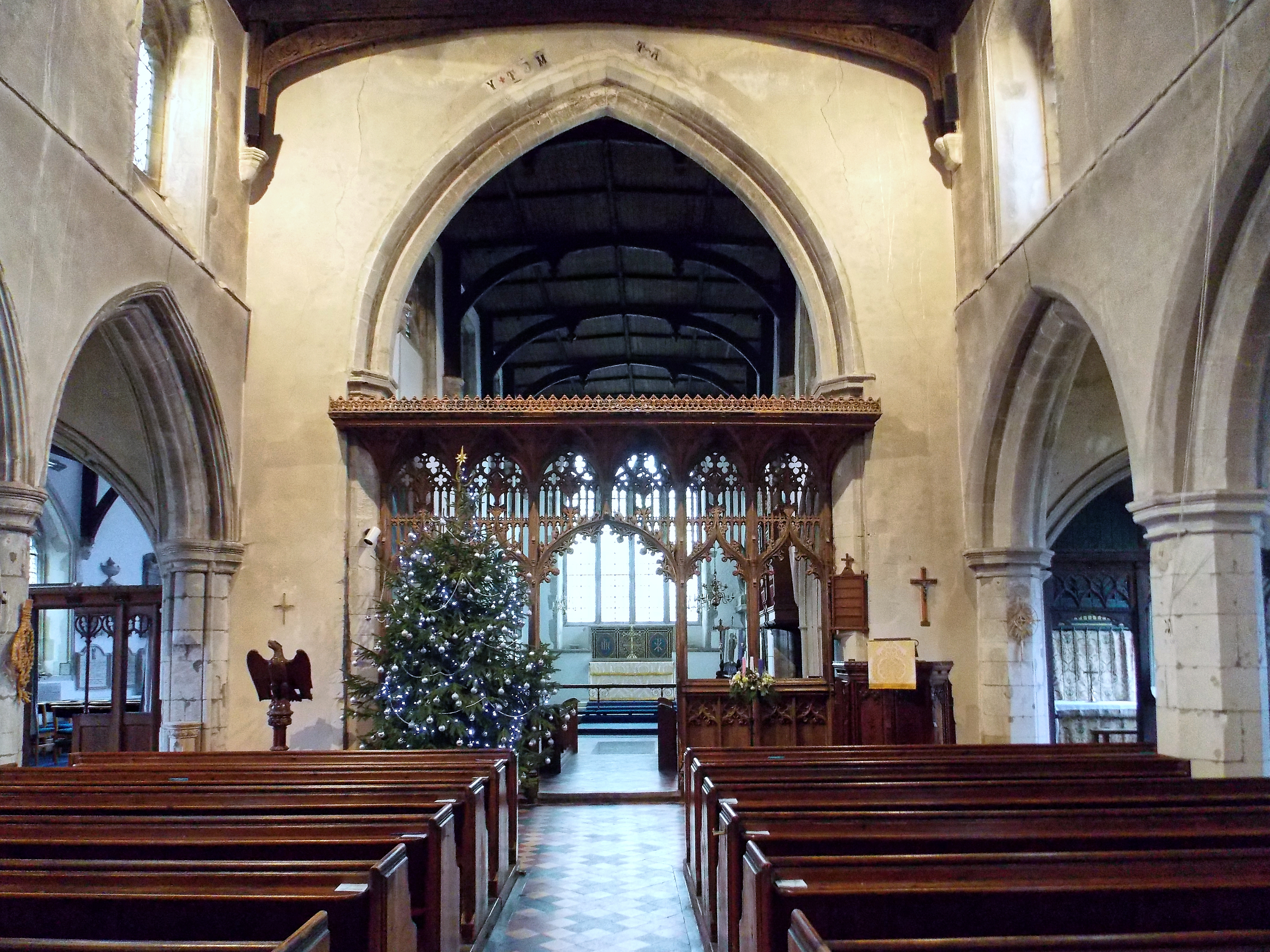
Nave and rood screen
