= Leez Priory =

Mansion in Essex, England

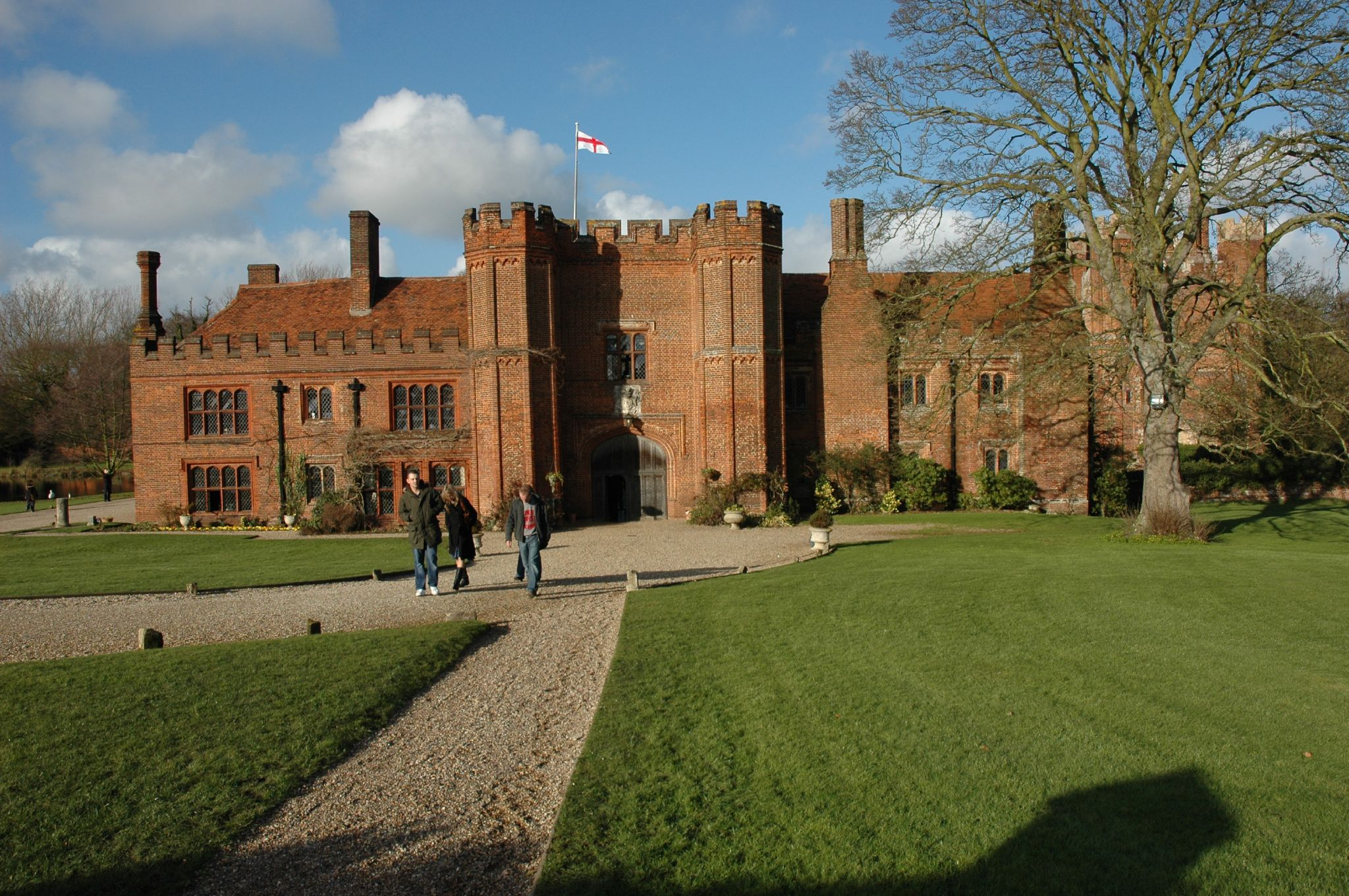
- Leez Priory in Essex

General information
- Architectural style: Tudor architecture
- Location: Leez Lane, Hartford End, Chelmsford, Essex, England
- Coordinates: 51.839473°N 0.467235°E
- Completed: c. 1520s–1560s
- Client: Richard Rich, 1st Baron Rich

Leez Priory is a 16th-century mansion in Little Leighs, a small parish in the district of Chelmsford in the county of Essex, England. The civil parish boundary between Felsted and Great and Little Leighs crosses the priory, so that it partially lies in Felsted and partially in Great and Little Leighs. The priory was designated a Grade I listed building in 1952.

== History ==
In 1220, Sir Ralph Gernon decided that the hamlet of Leez, in a dip by the banks of the River Ter, would provide the perfect location on which to found a house of Augustinian canons. The priory of St. Mary and St. John the Evangelist thrived for over 300 years. King Henry VIII sent Sir Richard Rich to dismiss the monastery, during the Dissolution of the Monasteries (1536–1541). When Sir Richard Rich, 3rd Baron Rich became the Earl of Warwick, he built his own great house on the site that is now known as Leez Priory. The remains of the Augustinian Priory are very much in evidence within the grounds to the south of the existing buildings, including extensive underground drainage conduits. Known as "Delicious Leez", both the site and the rose-brick buildings are breathtaking, with old garden walls and fish ponds indicative of life and times past.

In the years that followed, the mansion has been home to the Earls of Warwick and has been visited by Queen Elizabeth I, Princess Mary and many other nobles from the past.

In his 2007 book on the origins of the English Civil War, John Adamson emphasised the magnificence and political radicalism of Leez Priory in the 17th century. He concludes that in 1640 Leez and its owner, Robert Rich, 2nd Earl of Warwick, were probably the “topographical and moral centre” of opposition to the King.

Leez decended with the Earldom of Warwick to Charles Rich (1623–1673) 4th Earl of Warwick on the death of his brother Robert (1611–1659), who passed it to his nephew Robert Montague 1634–1682 son of the 2nd Earl of Manchester and Anne Rich. Leez remained in the Montague estates until sold shortly after the death of the 4th Earl and 1st Duke of Manchester in 1722 to Edmund Sheffield, Duke of Buckingham.

Much of it was demolished in 1753. At this time the property was purchased by Guy's Hospital, London. Guy's Hospital were still the owners in 1910, and for some time the property had been rented out as a private residence.

The priory was designated a Grade I listed building in 1952.

Leez Priory is now owned by Country House Weddings Ltd and, in 1995, was the first country house in the UK to be licensed to hold civil ceremonies.
