= St Mary the Virgin Church, Wendens Ambo =

Coordinates: 52.00525°N 0.20276°E

Church of St Mary the Virgin, Wendens Ambo
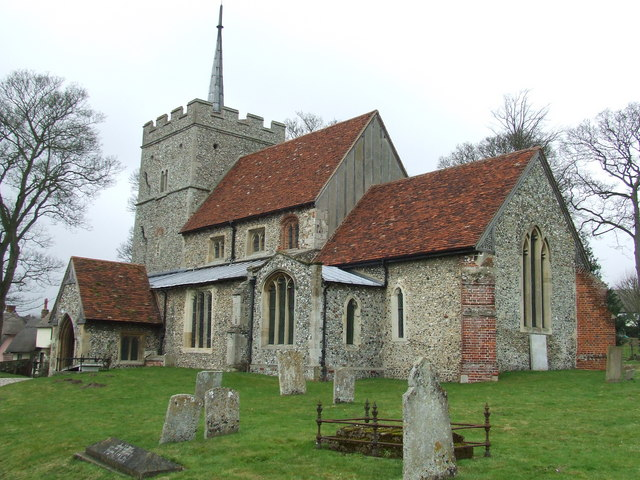
- Church of St Mary the Virgin, Wendens Ambo
- OS grid reference: TL 51292 36390
- Location: Church Path, Wendens Ambo, Essex
- Country: England
- Denomination: Church of England
- Previous denomination: Catholic

History
- Status: Active

Architecture
- Functional status: Parish church
- Heritage designation: Grade I listed
- Designated: 1967

Administration
- Diocese: Chelmsford
- Parish: Wendens Ambo

St Mary the Virgin Church is a Church of England parish church in the village of Wendens Ambo in Essex, England. It is listed Grade I for its architectural, historical and topographical value.

It originally served the village of Wenden Magna (Great Wenden), which was merged with Wenden Parva (Little Wenden) to form Wendens Ambo in 1662.

== Architecture ==
The building consists of a chancel with organ chamber, an aisled nave, a south porch and a tower surmounted by a Hertfordshire spike. The vestry in the western end of the south aisle, is unusually positioned.

=== Tower ===
The oldest part of the structure is the 11th-century tower. It is usually described as Norman. However, it could be pre-Conquest on the basis of a series of round window openings, like portholes: these small openings are found in Anglo-Saxon architecture and are sometimes called 'sound holes' although their actual function is unclear. The ones at Wendens Ambo are similar to late Saxon windows in St Bene't's church in Cambridge.

== History ==
The first church on the site was probably constructed of wood, perhaps as early as the eighth century, but no trace of it remains. It seems to have been rebuilt in stone about the time Domesday Book was written (1086 A.D.) with later additions in the 13th, 14th, 15th and 19th centuries.

The church register of Great Wenden commenced in 1540. After Volume II, which was the register of Little Wenden until 1662, the two parishes were united as Wendens Ambo.

=== Churchyard and hall ===
In the 19th century Lord Braybrooke gifted land and a hall neighbouring the church to enable an extension to the ancient churchyard. The hall was extensively modernised in 2007 and under lease to the Village Hall, is managed for use by a variety of active village interest groups and activities.
