= Mistley Towers =

Towers in Mistley, Essex, England

Coordinates: 51.94594°N 1.07739°E

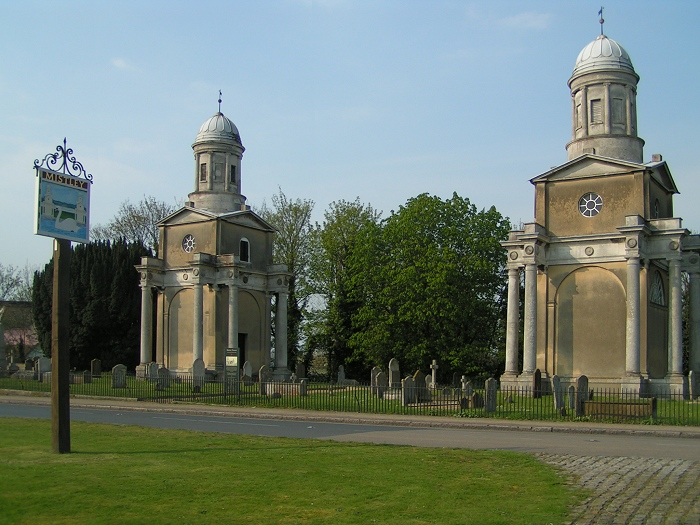
Mistley Towers

Mistley Towers are the twin towers of the now demolished Church of St. Mary the Virgin at Mistley in Essex (sometimes known as Mistley Thorn(e) Church). The original Georgian parish church on the site had been built in classical style early in the 18th century following the death of Richard Rigby Esquire. Later in that century there was a grandiose plan by his son, the wealthy politician Richard Rigby, to transform Mistley Thorn into a spa town.

== Enlargement ==
Rigby wished to see a church from the windows of his mansion and a suitably grand church was required for the affluent visitors expected to patronise the new spa. Thus in 1776, the renowned architect Robert Adam was commissioned to enhance the church. His design was in the neoclassical style, with a tower at both the east and the west ends of the church, and full height porticos to the north and south of the nave.

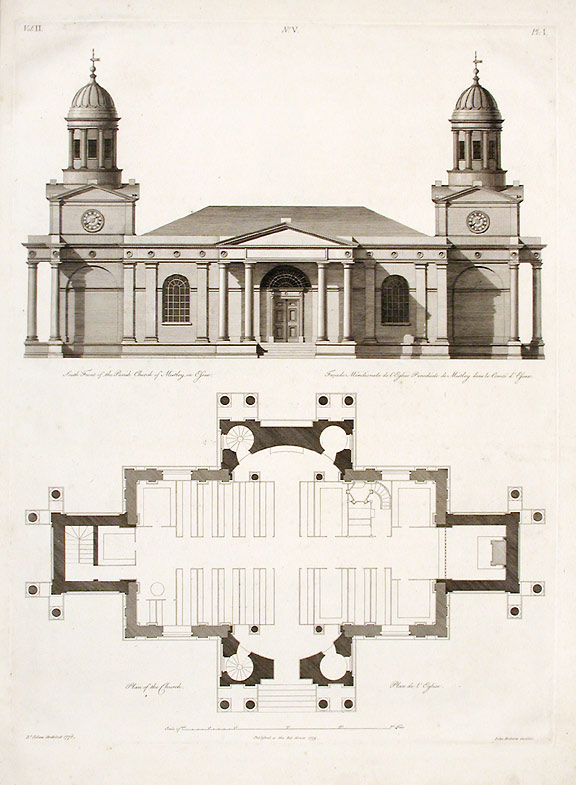
The south front and plan of Mistley Church by Robert and James Adam

== Demolition ==
After just under a century in this form, the nave was demolished in circa 1870, when the new parish church of Church of St. Mary and St. Michael was built in New Road. Columns from the porticos were reused at the inner corners of the towers, and the towers are now all that now remain of the once magnificent structure.

== Remainder ==
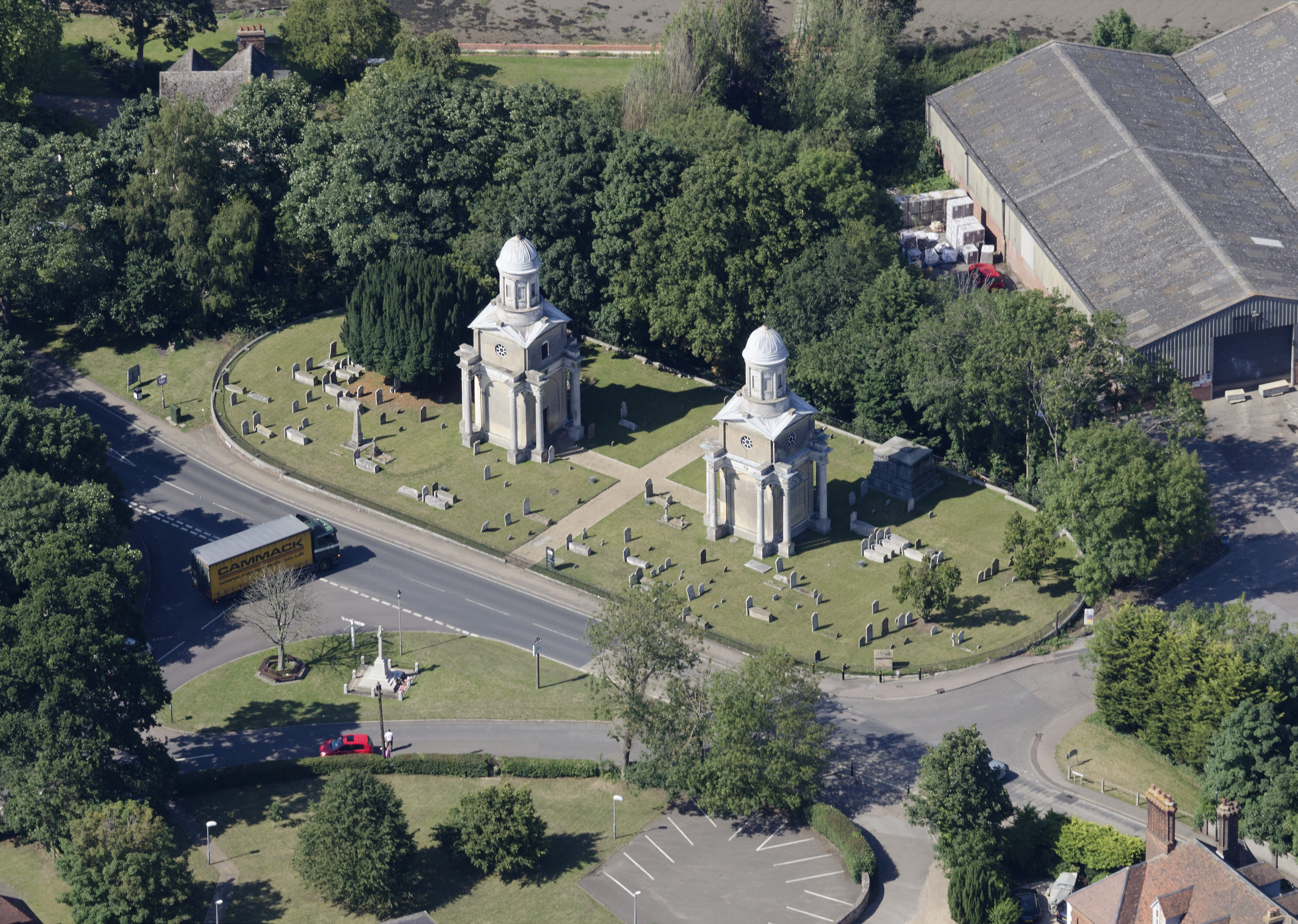
Aerial view

The square symmetrical towers are in the neoclassical style, resembling tall pavilions rather than towers, with each facade pedimented and the whole surmounted by a cupola decorated with blind windows interspersed by Ionic columns. At ground floor level two unfluted ionic columns at each corner support a decorative cornice. The columns are decorative only, and appear to serve no structural purpose. The design of the towers creates the impression that the building was once more of a miniature cathedral than a parish church. However, the main body of the church was small and occupied the (now empty) site between the two towers. It was a single storey structure with a simple hipped roof and entrance porticos at its centre. This was the part of Adam's church which was demolished in 1870. The remaining towers are Grade I listed and a scheduled monument.
