= St Peter's Church, Roydon =

Church in Essex, England

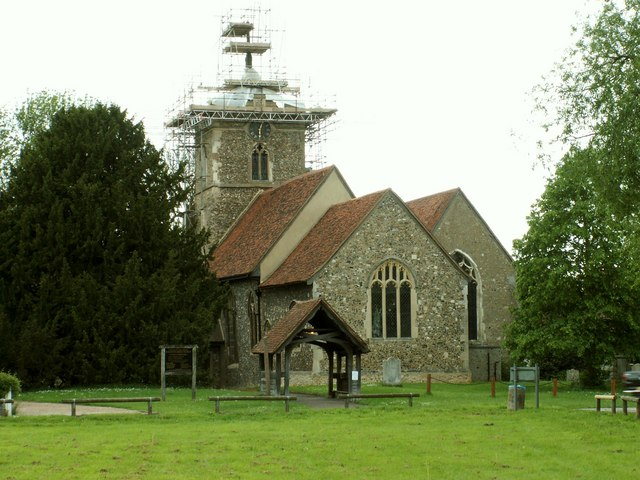
- St Peter's Church, Roydon
- 51°46′22.07″N 0°2′16.23″E
- Denomination: Church of England
- Website: St Peter's Church

History
- Dedication: Saint Peter

Architecture
- Functional status: Parish church
- Heritage designation: Grade I
- Designated: 20 February 1967
- Architectural type: Church

Administration
- Province: Canterbury
- Diocese: Chelmsford
- Archdeaconry: Harlow
- Deanery: Harlow
- Parish: Roydon

Clergy
- Vicar: Rev'd Dr. Anthea Cannell

St Peter's Church is a Church of England parish church in the village of Roydon in Essex, England.

== History ==
=== The Early Church in Roydon ===
It is not known when the first church was built in Roydon, but there was certainly a priest here in 1198 named William, as there is a document of that date bearing his name. It is probable that there was an Anglo-Saxon church, probably made of wood, similar to Greensted Church. After the Norman Conquest Roydon developed rapidly, because it was good farmland. There were four manors in Roydon: Roydon Hall where Ducketts Mead is now, Temple Hall on the site of Temple Farm, Doune (now Downe) Hall at the bottom of Low Hill Lane, and Nether Hall nearby.

In the 1200s Roydon was the most important of the local villages and held a weekly market, plus an Annual Fair on 1 August. This is the feast day of the dedication of the church to "St. Peter-ad-Vincula" (St. Peter in Chains), celebrating the day on which St. Peter was released by an angel from his chains in the prison in Ephesus. Roydon was an unusual parish, divided between the Hundreds of Waltham and Harlow (one of only five parishes nationally so divided), and being uncommonly large, with a total area of 3,031 acres.

The nave of the present church, just a simple rectangle, was built sometime between 1225 and 1240, according to the dating of the roof timbers by the eminent historian of timber buildings, Cecil J. Hewett. Initially in 1240 there was possibly a semicircular apse at the east end to house the sanctuary and the altar, but no evidence remains of this. The church contained a stone font, used for baptisms. That font has survived up to the present day, and is now sited by the north door. The font's stonework includes the heads of the four apostles, Matthew, Mark, Luke and John. The mason had no idea of what the apostles looked like, so he used his fellow villagers as models. Two similar heads, clearly by the same mason, are outside the south door to the church, and have been there since the church was built; that is how we know that the present day font is the original. To build St Peter's Church would clearly have needed money. This probably came from Sir Walter Fitzgerald, the Lord of the Manor of Roydon at that time, to whom the manors of Roydon Hall and Temple Hall were given in 1290. Sir Walter was one of the crusading Knights Templar, after which the Crusader public house and Temple Farm are named. The order was proscribed early in the next century throughout Europe, including in this country, because the Kings felt that the Templars were becoming too powerful. Many eminent Templars were put to death and their properties confiscated. In Roydon, their properties (including the church) passed into the hands of the Knights of St. John of Jerusalem.

Around 1380, it was decided that the church was not big enough for a growing and active village, and so a north aisle was built to enlarge it. The windows in the north aisle are all original, although all, except the east window, have been extensively restored. Several have the remains of the original glass in them at the top; unfortunately they were damaged during the Civil War and the main pictures (probably of saints) were removed.

The chancel was built at the east end of the original nave, with a wooden rood screen separating it from the nave. Most of the screen remains in its original form, but the doors have been repaired over the years and new wood incorporated. An unusual feature is a quatrefoil (four leafed clover) hole in the screen, which is believed to have been used for confessionals (in those days, all churches were Roman Catholic). Originally, above the screen was a gallery with a large wooden cross, probably with a carved figure of Christ hanging on it; the hole where the cross was fixed is still there on the top of the screen. The Roundheads, who did not approve of figures of Christ and his saints in churches, removed the cross during the Civil War. For hundreds of years, as the largest public building in the village, the church was used for secular meetings as well as for services. When such meetings were held in the nave, the gates of the screen would be closed to preserve the sanctity of the chancel from non-sacred meetings. There are some elderly villagers who remember this still happening before the Village Hall was built in the 1920s.

When the new glass screen was being installed during the recent refurbishment of the Colte Chapel, it was necessary to knock a hole in the north wall just inside the chapel to take a heavy steel beam. To the surprise of the workmen, the hole did not come through to the exterior, but into a cavity with an ornate carved roof above. The Diocesan Archaeologist was sent for, and he identified the cavity as a rood staircase, which had originally enabled people to go up to a gallery on top of the rood screen. Prior to the discovery, no written record was to be found of this staircase. A similar rood staircase can be seen, unconcealed, in the neighbouring church at Nazeing.

The ceiling of the chancel, now the Colte Chapel, is plastered. Up to the end of the Second World War, the rest of the church was similarly plastered. During the war a bomb was dropped nearby which did not hit the church directly but still badly cracked the ceilings in the nave and north aisle. To repair the ceilings it was necessary for the plaster to be removed, which revealed the original roof timbers. The decision was taken to leave the timbers on display – all very well for church historians, but not for the members of the congregation who had to endure the consequent draughts and cold in the winter.

In the first half of the 15th century it was decided that Roydon's church should have a tower; its construction was completed by 1450. There had probably been an earlier tower, because the present one contains remains of Norman work. In some early churches the living quarters of the priest were in the tower, but it does not appear that this was so in Roydon. The tower would certainly have held a bell to summon the parishioners to services, but no clock at that time.

And so some 550 years ago, the structure of the church was basically as we see it today. Outwardly the same (except for the clock), the inside would have looked somewhat different because there were no pews or chairs - everyone stood. There may have been some crude benches around the walls for the old and infirm (some churches had a stone bench built around the periphery) - hence the origin of the phrase "the weak go to the wall". There was just one altar, at the east end in the sanctuary, and, of course, the services were according to the Roman Catholic faith.

If you were to compare Roydon in 1450 to the modern-day, the only building recognisable would be St. Peter's Church, since no other buildings from that time have survived, except 'Baldwyns', then a cottage about a mile outside the village on the Epping Road. However, Roydon was about to enter a period of change and prosperity, for the Coltes were to arrive in the village.
