= Holy Innocents Church, Lamarsh =

Church of the Holy Innocents
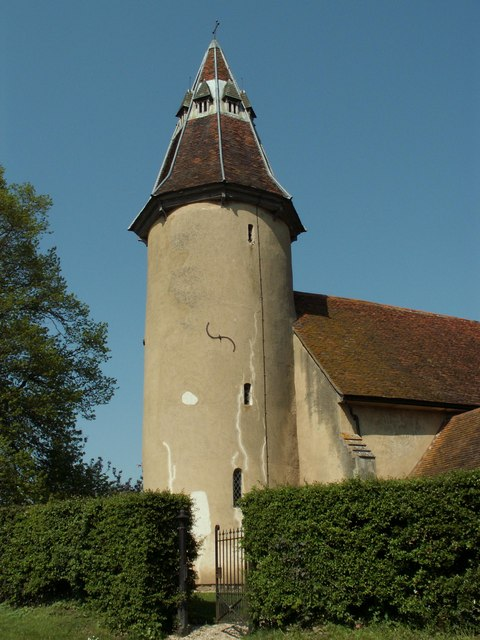
- Church of the Holy Innocents
- 51°59′26.8″N 0°45′3.5″E
- OS grid reference: TL 889 360
- Location: Lamarsh, Essex
- Country: England
- Denomination: Church of England
- Website: www.lamarshchurch.org.uk

History
- Dedication: Holy Innocents

Architecture
- Heritage designation: Grade I
- Designated: 21 June 1962

Administration
- Diocese: Diocese of Chelmsford

Holy Innocents Church is an Anglican church in the village of Lamarsh, in Essex, England. The building has a round tower and dates from the 12th century. It is a Grade I listed building.

== Description ==
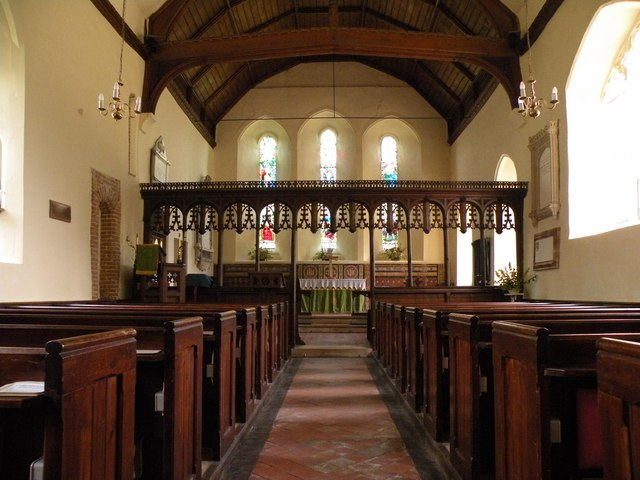
Interior looking east, showing the rood screen

There is no mention in the Domesday Book of 1086 of a church in the village. It is thought that the church dates from about 1140; it was probably built by Simon de Beauchamp, who was granted lands in north Essex by King Stephen at that time.

It is built of flint and tile rubble, which is rendered. It has a round tower; there are other churches with round towers in East Anglia, mostly in Norfolk. A roof was added to the tower in 1869.

The tower and nave date from the original building. The chancel, being the same width as the nave, was probably built at the same time. It was modified in the 14th century, with a doorway on the south side, and in 1869 was extended eastwards about 1 metre. The brick-built south porch and door are 16th-century.

=== Interior details ===
The rood screen was erected in the 15th century. It is of oak and has ten bays.

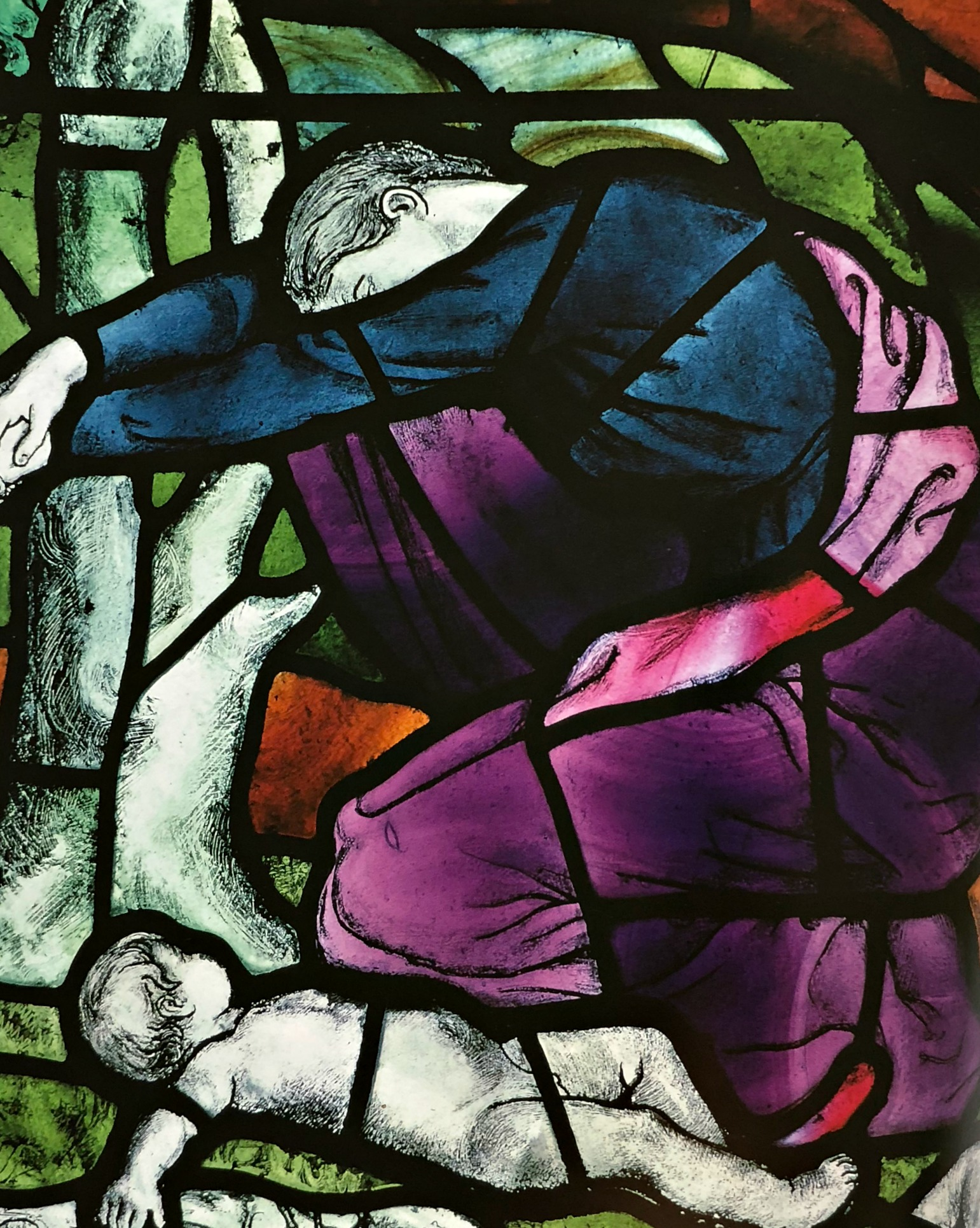
Holy Innocents: stained glass window by Mary Lowndes

The stained glass windows at the east end of the chancel were designed by Mary Lowndes in 1895. They were placed in memory of Rev. Charles Baker Teesdale, rector of the parish for 42 years.

The chamber organ was built by George Pike England. It was a gift to the church from Rev. Teesdale; it is thought it was in use privately in the rectory before installation in the church.
