= St Mary's Church, Chadwell St Mary =

Church of St Mary
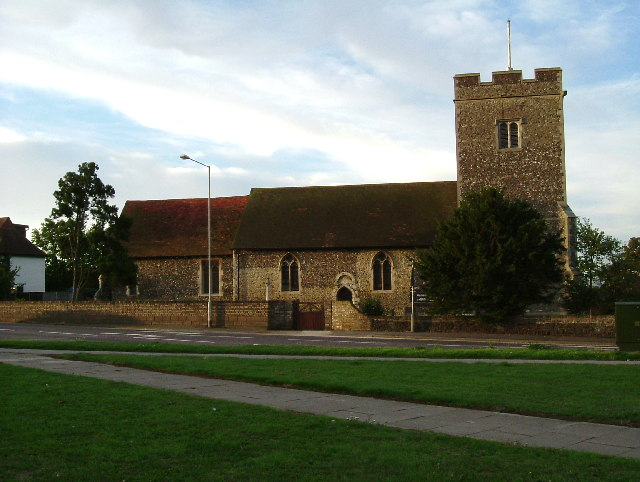
- Church of St Mary
- 51.4815°N 0.3695°E
- Location: Linford Road/Chadwell Hill, Chadwell St Mary, Essex, RM16 4DJ
- Country: England
- Denomination: Church of England
- Previous denomination: Roman Catholic Church
- Churchmanship: Evangelical
- Website: Parish website

History
- Status: Active

Architecture
- Functional status: Parish church
- Heritage designation: Grade I listed
- Designated: 8 February 1960

Administration
- Diocese: Diocese of Chelmsford
- Archdeaconry: Archdeaconry of Southend
- Deanery: Thurrock
- Parish: Chadwell

Clergy
- Priest: Revd Kate Carter

The Church of St Mary is a Church of England parish church in Chadwell St Mary, Thurrock, Essex. The church is a Grade I listed building. Together with Emmanuel Church, it forms the Parish of Chadwell St Mary in the Diocese of Chelmsford.

== History ==
The original Chadwell parish church was dedicated to the Virgin Mary and this is the source of the suffix "St Mary" in the modern name. It is a grade I listed building located at the crossroads overlooking the marshes. There was a church in Chadwell before the Norman conquest. The present church has a number of Norman features and probably dates to the 12th century. The tower was built in the early 16th century. The church contains an early memorial brass to Cicilye Owen (died 1603), the wife of Thomas Owen of London, who was a merchant tailor. The church has an extension on the south that was built at the beginning of the 20th century.

=== Present day ===
On 8 February 1960, St Mary's Church was designated a Grade I listed building.

The parish is within the Evangelical tradition of the Church of England. It no longer rejects the ordination of women.

== Notable graves and memorials ==
On the north side of the church is a war memorial to eight of Chadwell's dead from the World War I. In 2006, five names of World War II dead were added to this memorial.

Close to the church is the gravestone of Elizabeth Manning. When she died in 1805, her will was contested and this led to a landmark ruling that has been quoted frequently over the years.

Among the other stones in Chadwell churchyard there is a memorial to Kadzuo Yamazaki (or Kazuo Yamazaki), a 22-year-old Japanese naval officer. He died on 13 July 1899 in a fire on board the SS Kawachi Maru, while she was in Tilbury docks. The stone has an inscription in both English and Japanese.

== Gallery ==
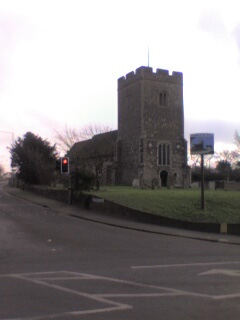
St Mary's Church

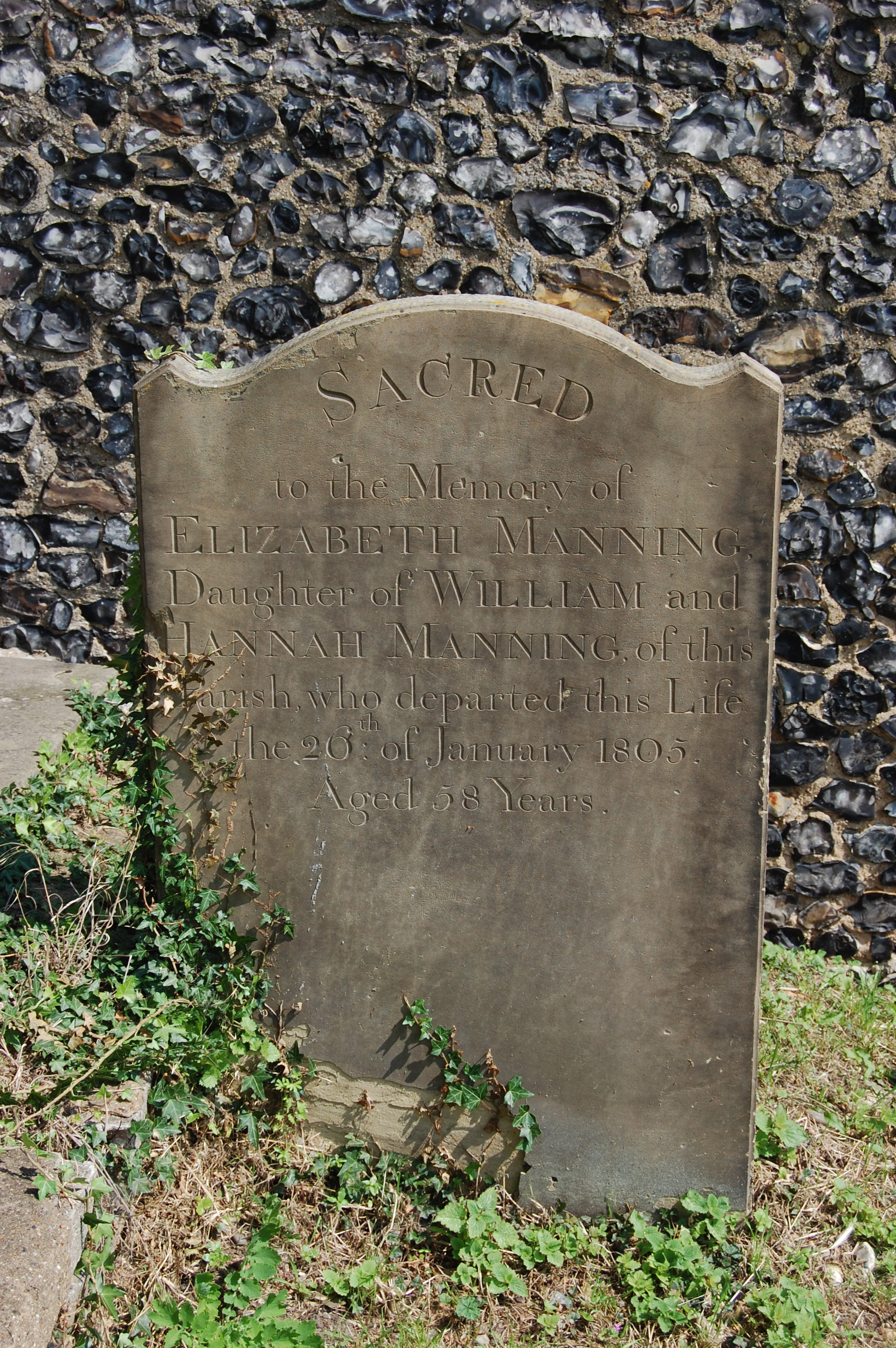
The gravestone of Elizabeth Manning in Chadwell churchyard

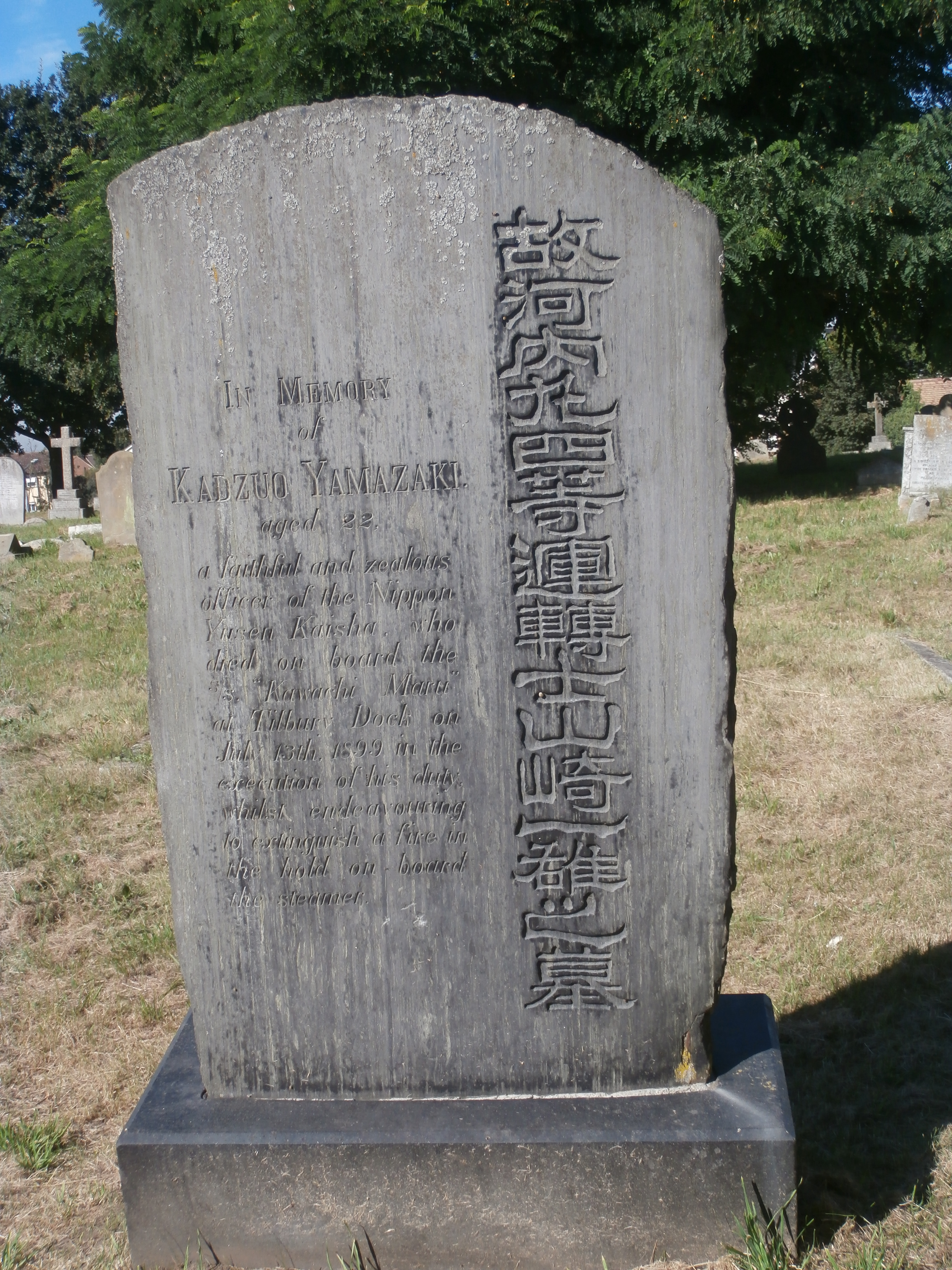
Gravestone of Kadzuo Yamazaki
