= Coggeshall (disambiguation) =

Coggeshall is a small market town in Essex, England.

Coggeshall may also refer to:

== People ==
- Calvert Coggeshall, abstract painter and designer
- Harris Coggeshall, American tennis player
- Henry Coggeshall, inventor of the Coggeshall slide rule
- Henry J. Coggeshall (1845–1914), American politician and lawyer
- John Coggeshall (1601–1647), a founder of Rhode Island
- John Coggeshall, Jr. (1624–1708), colonial deputy governor of Rhode Island, son of John Coggeshall
- Mary Jane Coggeshall (1837–1911), American suffragist
- Sir William Coggeshall (1358–1426), English Member of Parliament
- William Turner Coggeshall (1824–1867), American diplomat
- Mary C. Seward (Mary Holden Coggeshall Seward 1839-1919), American poet, composer, and civic activist

== Places ==
- Coggeshall Farm Museum, in Bristol, Rhode Island, US
- Coggeshall Hamlet, a small town in England

== See also ==
- Ralph of Coggeshall, English chronicler
