= Listed buildings in Coggeshall =

Historic structures in Essex, England

Coggeshall is a village and civil parish in the Braintree District of Essex, England. It contains 241 listed buildings that are recorded in the National Heritage List for England. Of these eight are grade I, 13 are grade II* and 216 are grade II.

This list is based on the information retrieved online from Historic England.

== Key ==
Grade	Criteria
I	Buildings that are of exceptional interest
II*	Particularly important buildings of more than special interest
II	Buildings that are of special interest

== Listing ==
Name	Grade	Location	Type	Completed (Note: The date given is the date used by Historic England as significant for the initial building or that of an important part in the structure's description.)	Date designated	Grid ref. (Note: The grid reference is based on the British national grid reference system, sometimes known as OSGB36, used by the Ordnance Survey.) Geo-coordinates	Notes	Entry number (Note: The "List Entry Number" is a unique number assigned to each listed building and scheduled monument by Historic England.)	Image	Wikidata
Dovecote 100 Metres South East of Holfield Grange	II				6 September 1988	TL8322023279; 51°52′41″N 0°39′37″E		1337922	Upload Photo	Q26622281
Grigg's Farmhouse	II				6 September 1988	TL8367122357; 51°52′10″N 0°39′59″E		1337921	Upload Photo	Q26622280
Houchin's Farmhouse	II*				2 May 1953	TL8708423548; 51°52′45″N 0°43′00″E		1123187	Houchin's Farmhouse More images	Q17557284
Hovell's Farmhouse	II				6 September 1988	TL8265323975; 51°53′04″N 0°39′09″E		1123188	Upload Photo	Q26416280
Monks Wood Cottage	II				19 July 1982	TL8282125105; 51°53′40″N 0°39′20″E		1123189	Upload Photo	Q26416281
Monkwood House	II				5 December 1986	TL8283525180; 51°53′43″N 0°39′21″E		1337923	Upload Photo	Q26622282
Nunn's Bridge, Coggeshall	II				12 October 2020	TL8371521870; 51°51′55″N 0°40′01″E		1471715	Upload Photo	Q100585562
Palmer's Farmhouse	II				30 July 1986	TL8617424919; 51°53′30″N 0°42′15″E		1337924	Upload Photo	Q26622283
Retaining Wall of Ha Ha Along the Boundary Between the Garden of Holfield Grange and the Public Road to the South West	II				6 September 1988	TL8307023246; 51°52′40″N 0°39′30″E		1123186	Upload Photo	Q26416279
Vinyard Cottage	II				6 September 1988	TL8241623372; 51°52′45″N 0°38′56″E		1123190	Upload Photo	Q26416282
Abbey Mill	I	Abbey Lane	watermill		2 May 1953	TL8554622145; 51°52′01″N 0°41′37″E		1168354	Abbey Mill More images	Q17536063
Abbey Mill House	II	Abbey Lane			31 October 1966	TL8552722155; 51°52′02″N 0°41′36″E		1123193	Upload Photo	Q26416285
Barn	II	Abbey Lane			6 September 1988	TL8545822200; 51°52′03″N 0°41′32″E		1123192	Upload Photo	Q26416284
Barn 45 Metres South of Coggeshall Abbey (residence)	II	Abbey Lane			6 September 1988	TL8552222185; 51°52′03″N 0°41′36″E		1337926	Upload Photo	Q26622284
Cartlodge/shelter Shed 60 Metres South of Coggeshall Abbey (residence)	II	Abbey Lane			6 September 1988	TL8552322175; 51°52′02″N 0°41′36″E		1168341	Upload Photo	Q26461599
Coggeshall Abbey (residence)	I	Abbey Lane			2 May 1953	TL8553722244; 51°52′04″N 0°41′36″E		1307099	Upload Photo	Q17536109
Guest House of Coggeshall Abbey	I	Abbey Lane	architectural structure		2 May 1953	TL8553522207; 51°52′03″N 0°41′36″E		1307071	Guest House of Coggeshall Abbey More images	Q17536099
The Abbot's Lodging and Corridor of Coggeshall Abbey	I	Abbey Lane			2 May 1953	TL8552922241; 51°52′04″N 0°41′36″E		1123191	Upload Photo	Q122853445
3, Albert Place	II	3, Albert Place			31 October 1966	TL8519522739; 51°52′21″N 0°41′20″E		1123152	3, Albert Place More images	Q26416242
1, Bridge Street	II	1, Bridge Street			31 October 1966	TL8498622535; 51°52′15″N 0°41′08″E		1123153	1, Bridge Street More images	Q26416243
2-6, Bridge Street	II	2-6, Bridge Street			6 September 1988	TL8496422531; 51°52′14″N 0°41′07″E		1337947	2-6, Bridge Street More images	Q26622304
3-11, Bridge Street	II	3-11, Bridge Street			6 September 1988	TL8498222524; 51°52′14″N 0°41′08″E		1337948	3-11, Bridge Street More images	Q26622305
Foundry House	II	15 and 17, Bridge Street			31 October 1966	TL8497822469; 51°52′12″N 0°41′08″E		1123154	Upload Photo	Q26416244
Bridge House	II	27, Bridge Street			6 September 1988	TL8496922413; 51°52′11″N 0°41′07″E		1123156	Upload Photo	Q26416246
Former Little Coggeshall Brewery	II	Bridge Street			6 September 1988	TL8497822428; 51°52′11″N 0°41′08″E		1123155	Upload Photo	Q26416245
Long Bridge	II	Bridge Street	bridge		31 October 1966	TL8494222359; 51°52′09″N 0°41′06″E		1123159	Long Bridge More images	Q26416251
Riverside Maltings	II	Bridge Street			31 October 1966	TL8495622371; 51°52′09″N 0°41′06″E		1123157	Upload Photo	Q26416248
Short Bridge	II	Bridge Street			6 September 1988	TL8495822460; 51°52′12″N 0°41′07″E		1123158	Upload Photo	Q26416250
Sheepcotes	II	6, Church Green			6 September 1988	TL8541422990; 51°52′29″N 0°41′31″E		1337949	Upload Photo	Q26622306
7-19, Church Green	II	7-19, Church Green			31 October 1966	TL8545723037; 51°52′30″N 0°41′34″E		1168517	Upload Photo	Q26461766
21, Church Green	II	21, Church Green			31 October 1966	TL8547223047; 51°52′31″N 0°41′35″E		1123160	Upload Photo	Q26416252
Wall Forming South East Boundary of Church Green from No 6 to the Vehicle Entrance of No8 (spinners)	II	Church Green			9 December 1982	TL8544023014; 51°52′29″N 0°41′33″E		1168533	Upload Photo	Q26461782
Crinkle Crankle Wall Form the Boundary Between the Back Gardens of Nos 9 and 11, Church St	II	Church St, Church Street			6 September 1988	TL8505722673; 51°52′19″N 0°41′12″E		1123162	Upload Photo	Q26416254
No. 1, Church Street	II	1, Church Street, CO6 1TU			6 September 1988	TL8504122633; 51°52′18″N 0°41′11″E		1168545	No. 1, Church Street More images	Q26461794
5 and 7, Church Street	II	5 and 7, Church Street			31 October 1966	TL8505022644; 51°52′18″N 0°41′12″E		1123161	5 and 7, Church Street More images	Q26416253
8, Church Street	II	8, Church Street			6 September 1988	TL8507122617; 51°52′17″N 0°41′13″E		1168894	8, Church Street More images	Q26462118
TC News	II	9 and 11, Church Street			6 September 1988	TL8507322648; 51°52′18″N 0°41′13″E		1306952	TC News More images	Q26593674
10, Church Street	II	10, Church Street			31 October 1966	TL8507822622; 51°52′17″N 0°41′13″E		1123167	10, Church Street More images	Q26416259
Rushmore House	II	15, Church Street			6 September 1988	TL8508322658; 51°52′18″N 0°41′14″E		1168573	Rushmore House More images	Q26461819
SJ Bunting	II	18, Church Street			31 October 1966	TL8510122650; 51°52′18″N 0°41′14″E		1168919	SJ Bunting More images	Q26462144
Herrings	II	20, Church Street			31 October 1966	TL8510822654; 51°52′18″N 0°41′15″E		1337954	Herrings More images	Q26622309
22, Church Street	II	22, Church Street			31 October 1966	TL8511822667; 51°52′19″N 0°41′15″E		1123168	22, Church Street More images	Q26416260
23, Church Street	II	23, Church Street			2 May 1953	TL8510522682; 51°52′19″N 0°41′15″E		1337950	23, Church Street More images	Q26622307
24, Church Street	II	24, Church Street			31 October 1966	TL8512222671; 51°52′19″N 0°41′16″E		1168937	24, Church Street More images	Q26462161
25, Church Street	II	25, Church Street			2 May 1953	TL8511122689; 51°52′19″N 0°41′15″E		1168601	25, Church Street More images	Q26461845
The Greyhound	II	26, Church Street			31 October 1966	TL8512722673; 51°52′19″N 0°41′16″E		1123169	The Greyhound More images	Q26416261
Saunders	II	27, Church Street			2 May 1953	TL8511722694; 51°52′20″N 0°41′15″E		1123163	Saunders More images	Q26416255
28, Church Street	II	28, Church Street			31 October 1966	TL8513322681; 51°52′19″N 0°41′16″E		1306748	28, Church Street More images	Q26593492
29 and 31, Church Street	II	29 and 31, Church Street			31 October 1966	TL8512222704; 51°52′20″N 0°41′16″E		1306909	29 and 31, Church Street More images	Q26593635
Spooners	II	30, Church Street			31 October 1966	TL8513922688; 51°52′19″N 0°41′17″E		1337955	Spooners More images	Q26622310
Conservative Club	II	32 and 32a, Church Street			31 October 1966	TL8515222687; 51°52′19″N 0°41′17″E		1168999	Conservative Club More images	Q26462222
Colvanbridge	II	36, Church Street			31 October 1966	TL8515722704; 51°52′20″N 0°41′17″E		1123170	Colvanbridge More images	Q26416262
Cooperative Stores	II*	37 and 39, Church Street			2 May 1953	TL8515222737; 51°52′21″N 0°41′17″E		1337951	Cooperative Stores More images	Q17557900
Creag Dhu	II*	40, Church Street			31 October 1966	TL8516322715; 51°52′20″N 0°41′18″E		1306727	Creag Dhu More images	Q17557746
Hope Cottage Hope Lodge	II	43, Church Street			2 May 1953	TL8515422755; 51°52′21″N 0°41′17″E		1123164	Hope Cottage Hope Lodge More images	Q26416256
44, Church Street	II	44, Church Street			6 September 1988	TL8517022724; 51°52′20″N 0°41′18″E		1337956	44, Church Street More images	Q26622311
The Old Bull	II*	45 and 47, Church Street			31 October 1966	TL8515922761; 51°52′22″N 0°41′18″E		1168720	The Old Bull More images	Q17557517
49, Church Street	II	49, Church Street			2 May 1953	TL8517422771; 51°52′22″N 0°41′18″E		1123165	49, Church Street More images	Q26416257
Resthaven the Manse	II	50, Church Street			31 October 1966	TL8518922749; 51°52′21″N 0°41′19″E		1123151	Resthaven the Manse More images	Q26416241
Padua Verona	II	51, 53, Church Street			2 May 1953	TL8518322783; 51°52′22″N 0°41′19″E		1168747	Padua Verona More images	Q26461986
52 and 54, Church Street	II*	52 and 54, Church Street			31 October 1966	TL8519922763; 51°52′22″N 0°41′20″E		1169046	52 and 54, Church Street More images	Q17557539
Clevedon	II	56, Church Street			31 October 1966	TL8520222770; 51°52′22″N 0°41′20″E		1123171	Clevedon More images	Q26416264
57 and 59, Church Street	II	57 and 59, Church Street			2 May 1953	TL8519022800; 51°52′23″N 0°41′19″E		1337952	57 and 59, Church Street More images	Q26622308
58 and 60, Church Street	II	58 and 60, Church Street			31 October 1966	TL8520922777; 51°52′22″N 0°41′20″E		1169070	58 and 60, Church Street More images	Q26462286
Cockrells	II	61, Church Street			2 May 1953	TL8520322806; 51°52′23″N 0°41′20″E		1306850	Cockrells More images	Q26593582
62-68, Church Street	II	62-68, Church Street			31 October 1966	TL8522922782; 51°52′22″N 0°41′21″E		1123130	62-68, Church Street More images	Q26416222
70, Church Street	II	70, Church Street			30 October 1966	TL8522422787; 51°52′22″N 0°41′21″E		1123131	70, Church Street More images	Q26416223
75 and 77, Church Street	II	75 and 77, Church Street			31 October 1966	TL8528622889; 51°52′26″N 0°41′25″E		1123166	75 and 77, Church Street More images	Q26416258
76, Church Street	II	76, Church Street			31 October 1966	TL8526722816; 51°52′23″N 0°41′23″E		1123132	76, Church Street More images	Q26416224
The Ceders	II	80, Church Street			31 October 1966	TL8529122856; 51°52′25″N 0°41′25″E		1123133	The Ceders More images	Q26416225
Coggeshall House	II	82, Church Street			9 December 1982	TL8530622864; 51°52′25″N 0°41′26″E		1123135	Coggeshall House More images	Q26416227
84, Church Street	II	84, Church Street			9 December 1982	TL8531522896; 51°52′26″N 0°41′26″E		1123136	84, Church Street More images	Q26416228
Wall Forming South East Boundary of Church Street, from Vehicle Entrance of No 84, Church Street, to Vehicle Entrance of No 2, Church Green	II	84, Church Street, 2, Church Green			19 July 1982	TL8533722932; 51°52′27″N 0°41′27″E		1123137	Upload Photo	Q26416229
The Woolpack Inn	II*	91, Church Street	pub		2 May 1953	TL8529922942; 51°52′27″N 0°41′25″E		1168802	The Woolpack Inn More images	Q17557521
Garden Wall Bounding Church Street Between Nos 70 and 76 Church Street	II	Church Street			9 December 1982	TL8524822814; 51°52′23″N 0°41′22″E		1337975	Upload Photo	Q26622329
Garden Wall Bounding Church Street from No 80 (the Cedars) Church Street to Corner of Horn Lane	II	Church Street			9 December 1982	TL8527322836; 51°52′24″N 0°41′24″E		1337976	Upload Photo	Q26622330
Garden Wall Bounding Horn Lane to South East of No 76, Church Street	II	Church Street, Horn Lane			9 December 1982	TL8530422794; 51°52′23″N 0°41′25″E		1169859	Upload Photo	Q26463033
Garden Wall Bounding Horn Lane to South West of No 80, Church Street	II	Church Street, Horn Lane			9 December 1982	TL8531422780; 51°52′22″N 0°41′26″E		1123117	Upload Photo	Q26416211
Parish Church of St Peter Ad Vincula	I	Church Street	church building		31 October 1966	TL8535023016; 51°52′30″N 0°41′28″E		1337953	Parish Church of St Peter Ad Vincula More images	Q15978778
Walls Bounding Church Street Between Nos 80 and 82 Church Street	II	Church Street			9 December 1982	TL8528822853; 51°52′24″N 0°41′25″E		1123134	Upload Photo	Q26416226
Church of St Nicholas, Coggeshall Abbey	I	Coggeshall Abbey, Abbey Lane	church building		31 October 1966	TL8536722279; 51°52′06″N 0°41′28″E		1337925	Church of St Nicholas, Coggeshall Abbey More images	Q17536248
Brae Cottage	II	7, Colchester Road			22 May 1980	TL8583622717; 51°52′19″N 0°41′53″E		1169257	Upload Photo	Q26462457
Lee's Farmhouse	II	Colchester Road			6 September 1988	TL8634022785; 51°52′21″N 0°42′19″E		1123138	Upload Photo	Q26416230
Barn 22 Metres North North West of Bullocks Farmhouse	II	Colne Road			6 September 1988	TL8514024561; 51°53′20″N 0°41′20″E		1337977	Upload Photo	Q26622331
Bullocks Cross Farmhouse	II	Colne Road			6 September 1988	TL8514924528; 51°53′19″N 0°41′21″E		1123139	Upload Photo	Q26416231
Granary 10 Metres North North West of Bullocks Cross Farmhouse	II	Colne Road			6 September 1988	TL8514424545; 51°53′19″N 0°41′20″E		1169320	Upload Photo	Q26462514
Hop Green Farmhouse	II	Colne Road			6 September 1988	TL8523025594; 51°53′53″N 0°41′27″E		1306620	Upload Photo	Q26593384
Curd Hall	II	Cuthedge Lane			17 August 1979	TL8321521648; 51°51′48″N 0°39′34″E		1123140	Upload Photo	Q26416232
Scrip's Cottage (at Rear of Scrip's House)	II	Cuthedge Lane			6 September 1988	TL8500921043; 51°51′26″N 0°41′07″E		1169367	Upload Photo	Q26462560
2 and 4, East Street	II	2 and 4, East Street			31 October 1966	TL8503522548; 51°52′15″N 0°41′11″E		1123145	2 and 4, East Street More images	Q26416237
Captain's Cottage	II	3, East Street			31 October 1966	TL8505622579; 51°52′16″N 0°41′12″E		1337939	Captain's Cottage More images	Q26622296
5 and 7, East Street	II	5 and 7, East Street			31 October 1966	TL8506422583; 51°52′16″N 0°41′12″E		1169378	5 and 7, East Street More images	Q26462572
6, 6a, 6b, 6c, 6d and 6e (the Barn), East Street	II*	6, 6a, 6b, 6c, 6d and 6e (the Barn), East Street			31 October 1966	TL8504422554; 51°52′15″N 0°41′11″E		1123146	6, 6a, 6b, 6c, 6d and 6e (the Barn), East Street More images	Q17557275
8, East Street	II	8, East Street			31 October 1966	TL8505922554; 51°52′15″N 0°41′12″E		1337943	8, East Street More images	Q26622300
Cottage and Country Gardens	II	9, East Street			31 October 1966	TL8506922584; 51°52′16″N 0°41′13″E		1123141	Cottage and Country Gardens More images	Q26416233
10 and 12, East Street	II	10 and 12, East Street			31 October 1966	TL8506722554; 51°52′15″N 0°41′12″E		1169630	10 and 12, East Street More images	Q26462809
Goodies Saddledon	II	11, East Street			31 October 1966	TL8509022588; 51°52′16″N 0°41′14″E		1123142	Goodies Saddledon More images	Q26416234
14, East Street	II*	14, East Street			2 May 1953	TL8508222556; 51°52′15″N 0°41′13″E		1123147	14, East Street More images	Q17557279
Montrose	II	16, East Street			2 May 1953	TL8508922563; 51°52′15″N 0°41′14″E		1169682	Montrose More images	Q26462861
Thorough Inn	II	17 and 19, East Street			31 October 1966	TL8510122586; 51°52′16″N 0°41′14″E		1169392	Thorough Inn More images	Q26462582
18, East Street	II	18, East Street			2 May 1953	TL8510222554; 51°52′15″N 0°41′14″E		1337944	Upload Photo	Q26622301
Thaddeus	II	21 and 23, East Street			31 October 1966	TL8511622590; 51°52′16″N 0°41′15″E		1337940	Thaddeus More images	Q26622297
25 and 27, East Street	II	25 and 27, East Street			31 October 1966	TL8512922598; 51°52′16″N 0°41′16″E		1169438	25 and 27, East Street More images	Q26462631
Swan House	II	29, East Street			31 October 1966	TL8514022602; 51°52′17″N 0°41′16″E		1123143	Swan House More images	Q26416235
Blackwater Cottage	II	32 and 34, East Street			31 October 1966	TL8510622568; 51°52′15″N 0°41′15″E		1169706	Blackwater Cottage More images	Q26462882
In Swan Yard	II	33, East Street			6 September 1988	TL8512822621; 51°52′17″N 0°41′16″E		1169457	Upload Photo	Q26462649
36, East Street	II	36, East Street			31 October 1966	TL8512222567; 51°52′15″N 0°41′15″E		1123148	36, East Street More images	Q26416238
Walpole House	II	38, East Street			31 October 1966	TL8513522570; 51°52′16″N 0°41′16″E		1169740	Walpole House More images	Q26462914
Cromwell Lodge	II	39, East Street			31 October 1966	TL8518122618; 51°52′17″N 0°41′19″E		1337941	Cromwell Lodge More images	Q26622298
Stuart House	II	41, East Street			31 October 1966	TL8519622624; 51°52′17″N 0°41′19″E		1169501	Stuart House More images	Q26462693
Brook House	II	42, East Street			31 October 1966	TL8516022572; 51°52′16″N 0°41′17″E		1123149	Upload Photo	Q26416239
43, 45 and 47, East Street	II	43, 45 and 47, East Street			31 October 1966	TL8521222635; 51°52′18″N 0°41′20″E		1123144	43, 45 and 47, East Street More images	Q26416236
Gambrel House Gambrel West	II	46, East Street			6 September 1988	TL8517522578; 51°52′16″N 0°41′18″E		1169764	Gambrel House Gambrel West More images	Q26462938
49, 51 and 53, East Street	II	49, 51 and 53, East Street			31 October 1966	TL8522122628; 51°52′17″N 0°41′21″E		1306490	49, 51 and 53, East Street More images	Q26593265
Abbotsmead	II	55, East Street			31 October 1966	TL8524322634; 51°52′17″N 0°41′22″E		1337942	Abbotsmead More images	Q26622299
Abbey View	II	57 and 59, East Street			31 October 1966	TL8526122628; 51°52′17″N 0°41′23″E		1169545	Abbey View More images	Q26462738
68, East Street	II	68, East Street			2 May 1953	TL8543022619; 51°52′17″N 0°41′32″E		1123150	Upload Photo	Q26416240
72, East Street	II	72, East Street			6 September 1988	TL8546322628; 51°52′17″N 0°41′33″E		1306386	Upload Photo	Q26593172
Coggeshall War Memorial	II	East Street, CO6 1SL	war memorial		15 July 2015	TL8536422633; 51°52′17″N 0°41′28″E		1427514	Coggeshall War Memorial More images	Q26677347
Garden Pavilion 40 Metres South of No 42 (brook House)	II	East Street			6 September 1988	TL8516322534; 51°52′14″N 0°41′17″E		1337945	Upload Photo	Q26622302
Mile Post 15 Metres South West of the Junction with St Peter's Road	II	East Street			6 September 1988	TL8571422680; 51°52′18″N 0°41′47″E		1337946	Upload Photo	Q26622303
Pump Against the East Side of Rear Wing of No 6	II	East Street			6 September 1988	TL8504822545; 51°52′15″N 0°41′11″E		1169563	Upload Photo	Q26462754
Monkwell	II	1, Grange Hill			31 October 1966	TL8496722345; 51°52′08″N 0°41′07″E		1123109	Upload Photo	Q26416204
Riverside Cottage	II	2, Grange Hill			6 September 1988	TL8494022313; 51°52′07″N 0°41′05″E		1337965	Upload Photo	Q26622320
Abbeydale	II	3, Grange Hill			31 October 1966	TL8496622323; 51°52′08″N 0°41′07″E		1337964	Upload Photo	Q26622319
St Peter's Cottage and Wing to Rear Associated with No 3	II	5, Grange Hill			6 September 1988	TL8496422309; 51°52′07″N 0°41′07″E		1123110	Upload Photo	Q26416205
The Grange	II	10, Grange Hill			2 May 1953	TL8490822133; 51°52′02″N 0°41′03″E		1123113	Upload Photo	Q26416207
14, 16 and 18, Grange Hill	II	14, 16 and 18, Grange Hill			6 September 1988	TL8493422086; 51°52′00″N 0°41′05″E		1123114	Upload Photo	Q26416208
15, Grange Hill	II*	15, Grange Hill			13 May 1975	TL8499222191; 51°52′03″N 0°41′08″E		1123111	Upload Photo	Q17557258
Grange Hill Cottages	II	22-28, Grange Hill			6 September 1988	TL8493422055; 51°51′59″N 0°41′05″E		1123115	Upload Photo	Q26416209
The Grange Barn	I	Grange Hill	barn		31 October 1966	TL8490322220; 51°52′04″N 0°41′03″E		1123112	The Grange Barn More images	Q17535876
Caxton House	II	3, 5 and 7, Market End			31 October 1966	TL8501722552; 51°52′15″N 0°41′10″E		1169881	Caxton House More images	Q26463055
8, Market End	II	8, Market End			31 October 1966	TL8497222562; 51°52′15″N 0°41′08″E		1169865	Upload Photo	Q26463039
9, Market End	II	9, Market End			2 May 1953	TL8501022545; 51°52′15″N 0°41′09″E		1123118	9, Market End More images	Q26416212
10, Market End	II	10, Market End			31 October 1966	TL8496322558; 51°52′15″N 0°41′07″E		1337966	Upload Photo	Q26622321
Part of the White Hart Hotel	II*	11, Market End			2 May 1953	TL8500622539; 51°52′15″N 0°41′09″E		1123119	Part of the White Hart Hotel More images	Q17557267
Part of White Hart Hotel	II	13, Market End			2 May 1953	TL8499822544; 51°52′15″N 0°41′09″E		1169925	Part of White Hart Hotel More images	Q26463120
Part of White Hart Hotel	II	15, Market End			31 October 1966	TL8498922541; 51°52′15″N 0°41′08″E		1337967	Part of White Hart Hotel More images	Q26685058
1, Market Hill	II	1, Market Hill			31 October 1966	TL8500722590; 51°52′16″N 0°41′09″E		1306268	Upload Photo	Q26593064
Surridge's	II	2, Market Hill			31 October 1966	TL8500622599; 51°52′17″N 0°41′09″E		1123120	Surridge's More images	Q26416213
Coggeshall Galleries	II	3, Market Hill			31 October 1966	TL8500222602; 51°52′17″N 0°41′09″E		1170011	Coggeshall Galleries More images	Q26463260
Chapel Hotel	II*	4, Market Hill	house		31 October 1966	TL8500422610; 51°52′17″N 0°41′09″E		1337968	Chapel Hotel More images	Q17557903
5, 5a and 6, Market Hill	II	5, 5a and 6, Market Hill			31 October 1966	TL8500222624; 51°52′17″N 0°41′09″E		1123121	5, 5a and 6, Market Hill More images	Q26416214
7, 8 and 9, Market Hill	II	7, 8 and 9, Market Hill			31 October 1966	TL8502422644; 51°52′18″N 0°41′10″E		1170058	7, 8 and 9, Market Hill More images	Q26463326
Lindsell Chairs	II	11, Market Hill			6 September 1988	TL8503622603; 51°52′17″N 0°41′11″E		1123122	Lindsell Chairs More images	Q26416215
Casanova's Chocolate House	II	12 and 13, Market Hill			6 September 1988	TL8503722595; 51°52′16″N 0°41′11″E		1337969	Casanova's Chocolate House More images	Q26622323
14 and 15, Market Hill	II*	14 and 15, Market Hill			31 October 1966	TL8502522588; 51°52′16″N 0°41′10″E		1170113	14 and 15, Market Hill More images	Q17557609
The Toby Jug Restaurant	II	16, Market Hill			6 September 1988	TL8502922580; 51°52′16″N 0°41′11″E		1123123	The Toby Jug Restaurant More images	Q26416216
17, Market Hill	II	17, Market Hill			6 September 1988	TL8503622582; 51°52′16″N 0°41′11″E		1170139	17, Market Hill More images	Q26463468
Building 22 Metres South West of Main Range of No 4 (chapel Hotel) and Abutting on Its Rear Extension	II	Market Hill			31 October 1966	TL8497222596; 51°52′17″N 0°41′08″E		1306228	Upload Photo	Q26593029
Boundary Stone Approximately 275 Metres East of the Gardener's Cottage, Marks Hall	II	Marks Hall, Marks Hall Road			6 September 1988	TL8441125872; 51°54′03″N 0°40′45″E		1123125	Upload Photo	Q26416218
Marks Hall Cottages	II	1 and 2, Marks Hall Road			6 September 1988	TL8406025456; 51°53′50″N 0°40′25″E		1337970	Upload Photo	Q26622324
Iron Bridge, Approximately 275 Metres South of Marks Hall Cottages	II	Marks Hall Road			6 September 1988	TL8400925191; 51°53′42″N 0°40′22″E		1123124	Upload Photo	Q26416217
Coach House 10 Metres North West of Marks Hall Cottages	II	Marks Hall Road			6 September 1988	TL8405625472; 51°53′51″N 0°40′25″E		1170145	Upload Photo	Q26463473
The Lodge	II	Marks Hall Road, CO6 1TE			6 September 1988	TL8535524109; 51°53′05″N 0°41′31″E		1169345	Upload Photo	Q26462539
The Old Rectory	II	Marks Hall Road			6 September 1988	TL8444324100; 51°53′06″N 0°40′43″E		1306180	Upload Photo	Q26592983
Visitor Centre at Markshall Estate (formerly Known As Bouchier's Barn)	II	Marks Hall Road, Coggleshall, CO16 1TG			29 May 1987	TL8397025168; 51°53′41″N 0°40′20″E		1337971	Upload Photo	Q26622325
Wall of Walled in Garden 300 Metres North of Marks Hall Cottages	II	Marks Hall Road			6 September 1988	TL8408625807; 51°54′01″N 0°40′27″E		1170160	Upload Photo	Q26463491
Byre with Hayloft at Warley Farm	II	Nunty's Lane			13 May 1988	TL8174125832; 51°54′05″N 0°38′25″E		1306156	Upload Photo	Q26592960
Great Nunty's Farmhouse	II	Nunty's Lane			6 September 1988	TL8240726422; 51°54′23″N 0°39′01″E		1123126	Upload Photo	Q26416219
Dick Nunn's Smithy	II	Off East Street, CO6 1SJ			9 November 2022	TL8515222626; 51°52′17″N 0°41′17″E		1480306	Upload Photo	Q122214015
Pointwell House	II	13, Pointwell Lane, Coggeshall Hamlet			6 September 1988	TL8532321522; 51°51′41″N 0°41′24″E		1337972	Upload Photo	Q26622326
Pointwell Mill House	II	Pointwell Lane, Coggeshall Hamlet			6 September 1988	TL8529921524; 51°51′41″N 0°41′23″E		1170230	Upload Photo	Q26463558
2 and 4, Queen Street	II	2 and 4, Queen Street			2 May 1953	TL8499522712; 51°52′20″N 0°41′09″E		1337973	2 and 4, Queen Street	Q26622327
Railings on Dwarf Wall and Gate and Gate Approximately 3 Metres South East of Wisteria House	II	13, Queen Street			6 September 1988	TL8508122761; 51°52′22″N 0°41′14″E		1170236	Upload Photo	Q26463564
Wistaria House	II	13, Queen Street			6 September 1988	TL8508022776; 51°52′22″N 0°41′14″E		1123127	Upload Photo	Q26416220
47, 49 and 51, Queen Street	II*	47, 49 and 51, Queen Street			31 October 1966	TL8522122889; 51°52′26″N 0°41′21″E		1123128	47, 49 and 51, Queen Street More images	Q17557270
65 and 67 Queen Street	II	65 and 67, Queen Street, CO6 1UE			22 February 1985	TL8525722917; 51°52′27″N 0°41′23″E		1170283	Upload Photo	Q26463615
69, 71, 73 and 75, Queen Street	II	69, 71, 73 and 75, Queen Street			22 February 1985	TL8526622928; 51°52′27″N 0°41′24″E		1123129	Upload Photo	Q26416221
79-89, Queen Street	II	79-89, Queen Street			25 June 1974	TL8529522968; 51°52′28″N 0°41′25″E		1337974	Upload Photo	Q26622328
Oak Cottage and Tudor Cottage	II	53a, Queen Street			6 September 1988	TL8522522912; 51°52′26″N 0°41′21″E		1170261	Upload Photo	Q26463585
1 and 3, Robin's Bridge Road	II	1 and 3, Robin's Bridge Road			6 September 1988	TL8487622831; 51°52′24″N 0°41′03″E		1123088	Upload Photo	Q26416184
Cradle House	II	Robin's Bridge Road			6 September 1988	TL8438923970; 51°53′02″N 0°40′40″E		1123089	Upload Photo	Q26416185
Gate House Farmhouse	II	Robin's Bridge Road			6 September 1988	TL8411923774; 51°52′56″N 0°40′25″E		1337993	Upload Photo	Q26622345
73 and 74, Stock Street	II	73 and 74, Stock Street			6 September 1988	TL8301122602; 51°52′19″N 0°39′25″E		1123092	Upload Photo	Q26416188
75 and 76, Stock Street	II	75 and 76, Stock Street			6 September 1988	TL8307622583; 51°52′18″N 0°39′29″E		1123093	Upload Photo	Q26416189
Barn 20 Metres North West of Stock Street Farmhouse	II	Stock Street			6 September 1988	TL8278822681; 51°52′22″N 0°39′14″E		1123091	Upload Photo	Q26416187
Stock Street Farmhouse	II	Stock Street			6 September 1988	TL8281222661; 51°52′21″N 0°39′15″E		1123090	Upload Photo	Q26416186
Clock House and Clock Tower	II	1, Stoneham Street	building		31 October 1966	TL8499522628; 51°52′18″N 0°41′09″E		1123094	Clock House and Clock Tower More images	Q26416190
Langan's Restaurant Premises 35 Yards North of Junction of Church Street and Stoneham Street	II*	2, 4 and 6, Stoneham Street			2 May 1953	TL8501522651; 51°52′18″N 0°41′10″E		1306051	Upload Photo	Q17557723
3, Stoneham Street	II	3, Stoneham Street			31 October 1966	TL8498922638; 51°52′18″N 0°41′09″E		1123095	3, Stoneham Street More images	Q26416191
Christmas House	II	5, Stoneham Street			31 October 1966	TL8497822644; 51°52′18″N 0°41′08″E		1123096	Christmas House More images	Q26416192
7, Stoneham Street	II	7, Stoneham Street			31 October 1966	TL8498722652; 51°52′18″N 0°41′09″E		1170401	7, Stoneham Street More images	Q26463857
Old House	II	8 and 10, Stoneham Street			2 May 1953	TL8501122663; 51°52′19″N 0°41′10″E		1123099	Old House More images	Q26416195
11, Stoneham Street	II	11, Stoneham Street			31 October 1966	TL8497622662; 51°52′19″N 0°41′08″E		1337994	11, Stoneham Street More images	Q26622346
Findings	II	12, Stoneham Street			2 May 1953	TL8500722670; 51°52′19″N 0°41′10″E		1337996	Findings More images	Q26622348
Well House	II	13, Stoneham Street			31 October 1966	TL8498122669; 51°52′19″N 0°41′08″E		1306072	Upload Photo	Q26592883
Stonehaven	II	14, Stoneham Street			31 October 1966	TL8501022682; 51°52′19″N 0°41′10″E		1170490	Stonehaven More images	Q26464036
16, Stoneham Street	II	16, Stoneham Street			31 October 1966	TL8500422683; 51°52′19″N 0°41′09″E		1123100	16, Stoneham Street More images	Q26416196
17, Stoneham Street	II	17, Stoneham Street			31 October 1966	TL8497422684; 51°52′19″N 0°41′08″E		1123097	17, Stoneham Street More images	Q26416193
18 and 20, Stoneham Street	II	18 and 20, Stoneham Street			31 October 1966	TL8499822695; 51°52′20″N 0°41′09″E		1306041	18 and 20, Stoneham Street More images	Q26592854
19, 21 and 23, Stoneham Street	II	19, 21 and 23, Stoneham Street			31 October 1966	TL8496522706; 51°52′20″N 0°41′07″E		1306076	19, 21 and 23, Stoneham Street More images	Q26592887
Olde Stoneham	II	22, Stoneham Street			31 October 1966	TL8499822705; 51°52′20″N 0°41′09″E		1337997	Olde Stoneham More images	Q26622349
Weavers Cottage	II	24, Stoneham Street			2 May 1953	TL8499222711; 51°52′20″N 0°41′09″E		1170532	Weavers Cottage More images	Q26464109
27, Stoneham Street	II	27, Stoneham Street			6 September 1988	TL8496222718; 51°52′20″N 0°41′07″E		1123098	27, Stoneham Street More images	Q26416194
Royal Oak	II*	38, Stoneham Street			31 October 1966	TL8495422787; 51°52′23″N 0°41′07″E		1123101	Upload Photo	Q17557254
Foresters	II	40, Stoneham Street			6 September 1988	TL8494122806; 51°52′23″N 0°41′06″E		1170540	Upload Photo	Q26464120
55-63, Stoneham Street	II	55-63, Stoneham Street			31 October 1966	TL8491922795; 51°52′23″N 0°41′05″E		1306083	Upload Photo	Q26592893
65 and 67, Stoneham Street	II	65 and 67, Stoneham Street			6 September 1988	TL8490722813; 51°52′24″N 0°41′05″E		1337995	Upload Photo	Q26622347
Barn 40 Metres North of Monks Downs Farmhouse	II	Tey Road			6 September 1988	TL8613823562; 51°52′46″N 0°42′10″E		1123102	Upload Photo	Q26416197
The Old Lace Shop	II	4, The Gravel			6 September 1988	TL8494222501; 51°52′14″N 0°41′06″E		1123116	Upload Photo	Q26416210
1 and 3, West Street	II	1 and 3, West Street			31 October 1966	TL8494822532; 51°52′14″N 0°41′06″E		1337963	1 and 3, West Street More images	Q26622318
2 and 4, West Street	II	2 and 4, West Street			31 October 1966	TL8496022556; 51°52′15″N 0°41′07″E		1337959	Upload Photo	Q26622314
Posts, Railings and Dwarf Wall 5 Metres South of Hare Bridge House	II	24, West Street			6 September 1988	TL8485722537; 51°52′15″N 0°41′01″E		1337961	Upload Photo	Q26622316
Unity Cottage	II	5, West Street			31 October 1966	TL8494222525; 51°52′14″N 0°41′06″E		1123890	Upload Photo	Q26416976
6 and 8, West Street	II	6 and 8, West Street			31 October 1966	TL8493622547; 51°52′15″N 0°41′06″E		1305947	6 and 8, West Street More images	Q26592768
The Cricketers Public House	II*	7, West Street			24 June 1983	TL8493022531; 51°52′14″N 0°41′05″E		1337596	The Cricketers Public House More images	Q17557807
10, West Street	II	10, West Street			31 October 1966	TL8492622546; 51°52′15″N 0°41′05″E		1123103	10, West Street More images	Q26416198
11-21, West Street	II	11-21, West Street			31 October 1966	TL8480922513; 51°52′14″N 0°40′59″E		1123891	11-21, West Street More images	Q26416977
12, West Street	II	12, West Street			31 October 1966	TL8492022546; 51°52′15″N 0°41′05″E		1170761	12, West Street More images	Q26464420
14, West Street	II	14, West Street			31 October 1966	TL8491522545; 51°52′15″N 0°41′05″E		1337960	14, West Street	Q26622315
East Part of No 16	II	16, West Street			31 October 1966	TL8490822547; 51°52′15″N 0°41′04″E		1170777	East Part of No 16 More images	Q26464445
West Part of No 16	II	16, West Street			31 October 1966	TL8490422543; 51°52′15″N 0°41′04″E		1123104	Upload Photo	Q26416199
Gravel House	II	18, West Street			31 October 1966	TL8489522544; 51°52′15″N 0°41′03″E		1170784	Gravel House More images	Q26464449
20, West Street	II	20, West Street			6 September 1988	TL8487422543; 51°52′15″N 0°41′02″E		1234276	20, West Street More images	Q26527693
John H King and Sons Limited	II	22, West Street			6 September 1988	TL8485022588; 51°52′16″N 0°41′01″E		1123105	Upload Photo	Q26416200
Paycocke's Cottage	II	23, West Street			31 October 1966	TL8479922508; 51°52′14″N 0°40′58″E		1123892	Paycocke's Cottage More images	Q26416978
Hare Bridge House	II	24, West Street			6 September 1988	TL8485722548; 51°52′15″N 0°41′02″E		1170799	Hare Bridge House More images	Q26464475
Paycocke's	I	25, West Street	building		2 May 1953	TL8478322508; 51°52′14″N 0°40′58″E		1337597	Paycocke's More images	Q17536153
The Fleece Public House	II*	27, West Street	pub		2 May 1953	TL8477622498; 51°52′14″N 0°40′57″E		1123893	The Fleece Public House More images	Q17557468
Ari Jaba	II	31, 33 and 35, West Street			31 October 1966	TL8474022494; 51°52′14″N 0°40′55″E		1337598	Upload Photo	Q26621999
37, West Street	II	37, West Street			31 October 1966	TL8473522492; 51°52′13″N 0°40′55″E		1123894	Upload Photo	Q26416979
Wefan House	II	39, West Street			31 October 1966	TL8470522488; 51°52′13″N 0°40′53″E		1123895	Upload Photo	Q26416980
43-47, West Street	II	43-47, West Street			30 April 1979	TL8469622484; 51°52′13″N 0°40′53″E		1337599	Upload Photo	Q26622000
89, West Street	II	89, West Street			6 September 1988	TL8433122420; 51°52′12″N 0°40′34″E		1123896	Upload Photo	Q26416981
91 and 93, West Street	II	91 and 93, West Street			6 September 1988	TL8431722421; 51°52′12″N 0°40′33″E		1305829	Upload Photo	Q26592659
95-103, West Street	II	95-103, West Street			6 September 1988	TL8429822418; 51°52′12″N 0°40′32″E		1337600	Upload Photo	Q26622001
104, West Street	II	104, West Street			6 September 1988	TL8429622438; 51°52′12″N 0°40′32″E		1337962	Upload Photo	Q26622317
105, West Street	II	105, West Street			6 September 1988	TL8428922417; 51°52′12″N 0°40′32″E		1170976	Upload Photo	Q26464690
106 and 106a, West Street	II	106 and 106a, West Street			6 September 1988	TL8428822437; 51°52′12″N 0°40′32″E		1170824	Upload Photo	Q26464506
108, West Street	II	108, West Street			6 September 1988	TL8428222439; 51°52′12″N 0°40′31″E		1123107	Upload Photo	Q26416202
110, West Street	II	110, West Street			6 September 1988	TL8427622436; 51°52′12″N 0°40′31″E		1170834	Upload Photo	Q26464518
112, West Street	II	112, West Street			6 September 1988	TL8427022436; 51°52′12″N 0°40′31″E		1123108	Upload Photo	Q26416203
114 and 116, West Street	II	114 and 116, West Street			6 September 1988	TL8423722428; 51°52′12″N 0°40′29″E		1305891	Upload Photo	Q26592717
Finings House and Drying House at Isinglass Factory	II	West Street			13 August 1998	TL8422922466; 51°52′13″N 0°40′29″E		1376101	Upload Photo	Q26656764
Highfields Farmhouse	II	West Street			2 May 1953	TL8428122627; 51°52′18″N 0°40′32″E		1170814	Upload Photo	Q26464494
Main Tannery Building at Isinglass Factory	II	West Street			13 August 1998	TL8417322433; 51°52′12″N 0°40′26″E		1376098	Upload Photo	Q26656761
Milepost 17 Metres North East of No 125	II	West Street			6 September 1988	TL8410622396; 51°52′11″N 0°40′22″E		1123897	Upload Photo	Q26416982
Office Building at Isinglass Factory	II	West Street			13 August 1998	TL8414322414; 51°52′12″N 0°40′24″E		1376099	Upload Photo	Q26656762
Stable/tannery Building at Isinglass Factory (that Part Adjoining 114-116 West Street)	II	West Street			13 August 1998	TL8425222451; 51°52′13″N 0°40′30″E		1376100	Upload Photo	Q26656763
The Cart Lodge at Highfields	II	West Street			3 June 1985	TL8428022682; 51°52′20″N 0°40′32″E		1123106	Upload Photo	Q26416201

== See also ==
- Grade I listed buildings in Essex
- Grade II* listed buildings in Essex

== Sources ==
- Bettley, James; Pevsner, Nikolaus (2007) [1954], Essex, The Buildings of England, New Haven and London: Yale University Press, ISBN 978-0-300-11614-4
