= Gauer =

Gauer is a surname of German origin, originating as a topographic surname for someone from the country. Notable people with the surname include:

- Charlie Gauer (1941–1973), American professional football player and assistant coach
- George Gauer (1892–1992), American printer, real estate salesman, and politician

== See also ==
- Gauger
- Gager (disambiguation)
