= John Sharpe =

John Sharpe may refer to:

- Johannes Sharpe (ca. 1360-after 1415), German philosopher
- John Sharpe (cricketer) (1866–1936), English test cricketer
- John Sharpe (tennis) (born 1945), Canadian Davis Cup player
- John Sharpe (publisher), American naval officer and publisher of economic books about distributism
- John Sharpe (footballer) (born 1957), English football (soccer) player
- John Sharpe (courtier) (died 1518), courtier to King Henry VII
- John Sharpe (born 1967), Australian convicted of the speargun Sharpe family murders
- John Henry Sharpe, Premier of Bermuda, 1975–1977
- John Robin Sharpe (born c. 1933), Canadian convicted of child sexual abuse in R v Sharpe
- John Sharpe (MP), British Member of Parliament for Callington, 1754–1756
- John Walker Sharpe (1916–1997), Scottish physicist
- Jon Sharpe (died 2004), original author of The Trailsman series of Western novels

== See also ==
- John Sharp (disambiguation)
- Jack Sharpe (disambiguation)
