= John Sharpe (courtier) =

Courtier to King Henry VII

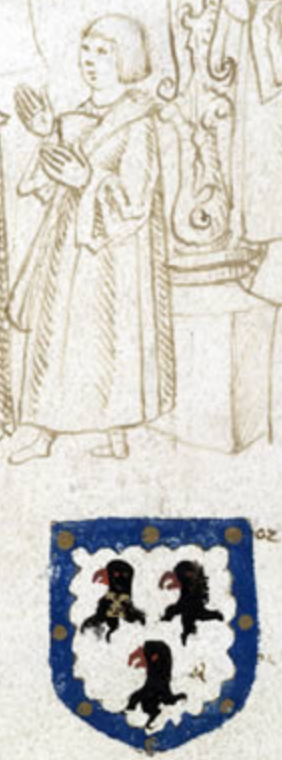
John Sharpe above his coat of arms (Argent, three rook's heads erased sable a bordure azure bezantée) at the deathbed of King Henry VII at Richmond Palace, 1509 (detail). Drawn by Sir Thomas Wriothesley.

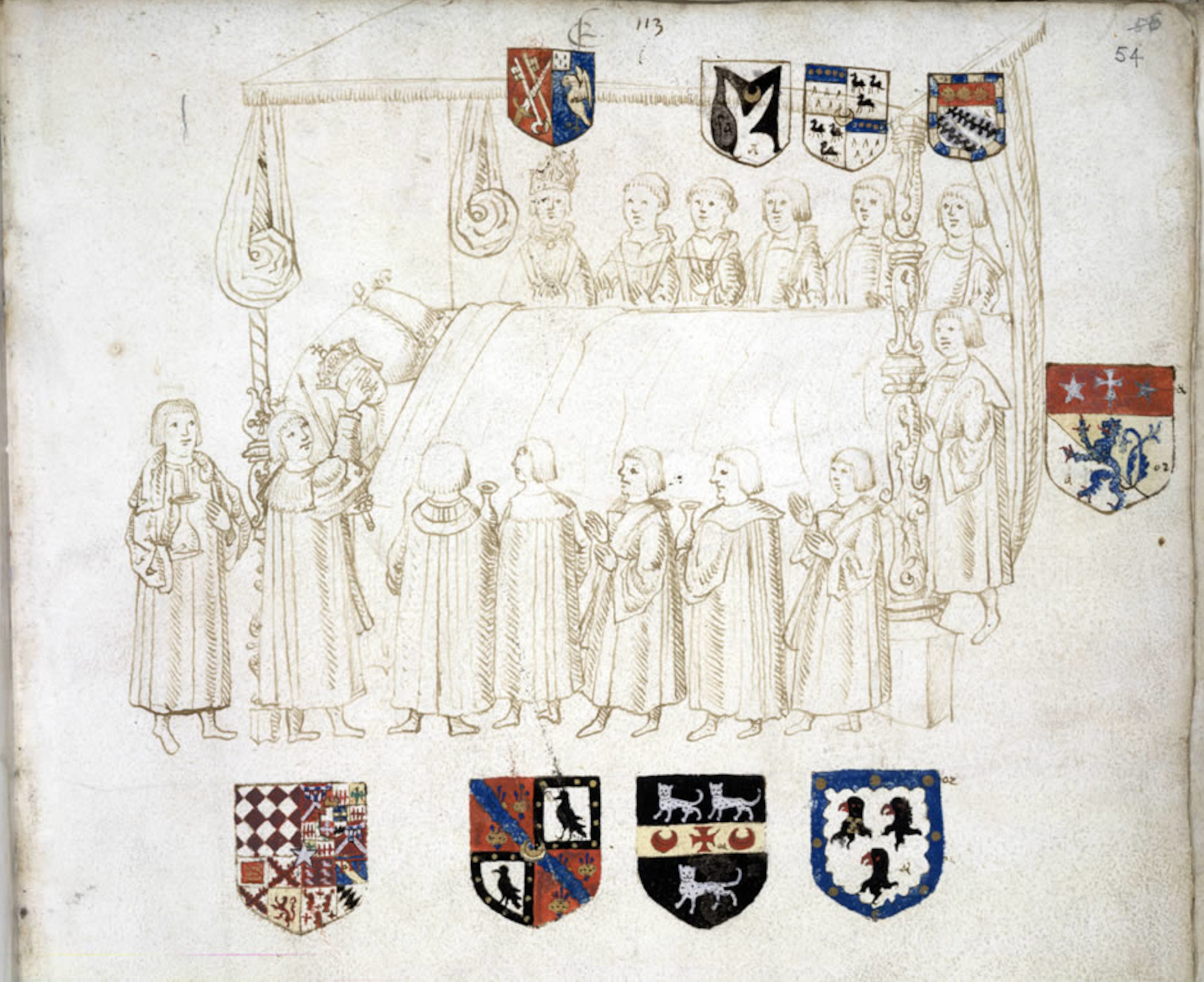
Scene at deathbed of King Henry VII at Richmond Palace, 1509. John Sharpe is on the king's right hand, furthest away, with his arms depicted below. Drawn contemporaneously from witness accounts by the courtier Sir Thomas Wriothesley (died 1534), who wrote an account of the proceedings. BL Add. MS 45131, f.54.

Sir John Sharpe (died 1518) of Coggeshall in Essex was a courtier (gentleman usher) to King Henry VII (1485–1509). He was present at the king's death-bed as is evident from a drawing of the event by Sir Thomas Wriothesley (died 1534), Garter King of Arms.

== Origins ==
He was the third son of Christopher Sharpe (4th son of John Sharpe by his wife Janne Staunton, a daughter and co-heiress of Thomas Staunton of Essex by his wife Katherine), appointed on 26 Nov 1460 as Receiver of the Duchy of Lancaster for Norfolk, Suffolk and Cambridgeshire and appointed Escheator for Yorkshire on 5 Nov 1468.

== Career ==
He held the office of Gauger of the Port of Bristol, in which office following his death he was replaced by Roger Chaloner, at the command of King Henry VIII.

As a gentleman usher, he received a legacy of £100 from King Henry VII. Other offices he held were: "Engraver of the King's dies for gold and silver coinage" and "Keeper of the change and exchange". He was knighted by the young King Henry VIII, his former master's son and heir, in the church at Tourney on 25 September (or December) 1513, "after the king came from mass under his banner". On 21 April 1515, he was appointed to the office of steward, receiver, surveyor & feodary of the Honour of Wormegay, and on 16 Oct 1518 was appointed Steward of the Duchy of Lancaster for Norfolk, Suffolk, and Cambridgeshire.

== Death ==
He died on 22 January 1518/19.

== Will ==
The will of Sir John Sharpe was dated 7 June 1518 and was proved on 12 February 1518/19. His Inquisition post mortem was held in Norfolk on 27 September 1520. His will mentions his three married sisters and also makes reference to his holding a lease of a "mansion and lodgings at Coggeshall Abbey". He also had a garden next to the infirmary of Coggeshall Abbey and had exclusive use of St Katherine's Chapel within the monastic church. Sir John's lease has been lost, but that granted by the Abbot in 1528 to his successor, Clement Harleston, locates this mansion next to the infirmary. Harleston similarly had exclusive use of St Katherine's Chapel, on the north side of the nave of the abbey church.

He bequeathed his property at Coggeshall Abbey to Isabel Damme, whom he called "the best assured and most faithful friend that I ever yet knew or could find in all my life".

In 1525, seven years after his death, "the bailiff is ordered to distrain [seize] the lands, tenements, and tenters in Poyntell Street called Gulles late of Sir John Sharp Knight, deceased, and before that of Christopher Sharp his father held of the Lord by the rent of £1 8shillings 10d per annum".
