= John Shairp =

John Shairp may refer to:

- John Shairp (lawyer), Scottish lawyer and businessman
- John Campbell Shairp, Scottish critic and man of letters

== See also ==
- John Sharp (disambiguation)
