= Gauger =

Gauger is a surname of German origin, meaning "to wander around or roam", referring to a vagrant or traveler. Notable people with the surname include:

- Gary Gauger (born 1952), American man wrongfully convicted of murder
- Martin Gauger (1905–1941), German jurist and pacifist
- Stephane Gauger (1970–2018), Vietnamese-born American film director, screenwriter, and cinematographer

== See also ==
- Gager (disambiguation)
- Gauer
