= John Sharp =

John Sharp may refer to:

== Politicians ==
- John Sharp (English politician) (1678–1727), English politician and lawyer, MP for Ripon, 1701–1715
- John Sharp (New Zealand politician) (1828–1919), member of parliament and mayor of Nelson
- John Sharp (Australian politician) (born 1954), Australian politician, member of the Australian House of Representatives
- John Sharp (Texas politician) (born 1950), current chancellor of the Texas A&M University System
- John H. Sharp (1874–1957), justice of the Supreme Court of Texas

== Religion ==
- John Sharp (minister) (1572–1647), exiled Scottish minister and Professor of Divinity
- John Sharp (bishop) (1643–1714), English divine, Archbishop of York
- John Sharp (Archdeacon of Northumberland) (1723–1792), English clergyman and charity administrator
- John Sharp (Mormon) (1820–1891), leader of The Church of Jesus Christ of Latter-day Saints in Utah Territory
- John Sharp (Archdeacon in South-Eastern Europe) (1888–1950), English clergyman

== Others ==
- John Sharp (actor) (1920–1992), British television actor
- John Sharp (British Army officer) (1917–1977), British Army general
- John Sharp (footballer) (1885–1965), Scottish footballer
- John M. Sharp, professor of geology at The University of Texas at Austin
- Jack Sharp (1878–1938), English cricketer (Lancashire) and footballer (Everton)
- John Sharp (referee), UFC and MMA official from Australia
- John Sharp (rower) (1931–1981), Canadian Olympic rower
- John Sharp (1965–1981), victim of the Keddie murders

== See also ==
- Jack Sharp (disambiguation)
- John Sharpe (disambiguation)
- Jon Sharp (born 1977), first team coach of rugby league club Crusaders
