= Honywood Community Science School =

Coordinates: 51.8782°N 0.6893°E

Location
- Westfield Drive; Coggeshall, Essex, CO6 1PZ; England

Information
- Type: Academy
- Established: 1964; 62 years ago
- Local authority: Essex
- Specialist: Science College
- Department for Education URN: 136729 Tables
- Ofsted: Reports
- Headteacher: James Saunders
- Gender: Coeducational
- Age: 11 to 16
- Enrolment: 1,007
- Publication: Honywood Gazette (Weekly)
- Website: https://honywoodschool.com/

Honywood Community Science School is a secondary school in Coggeshall, Essex, England.

It was first opened in 1964 and became Honywood School catering for 11–16 year olds. The average on roll is around 1100 learners.

== Tablet computers ==
In May 2011 the school announced that each pupil was to be given their own iPad 2 tablet to help with their studies, at the cost of £500,000. The school became a case study for Apple. It was reported in 2015, that police investigated "inappropriate" Skype and Snapchat images" on the school iPads, with an incident of grooming occurring during lesson time on a school issued iPad. The school implemented a new upgrade protocol to prevent any further occurrences.

== Expansion ==
In 2014 the school submitted a proposal to rebuild the school on land entrusted to the Marks Hall Charitable Trust. Marks Hall would develop 26 acres of land to the north of Coggeshall, building 300 houses and developing a small industrial estate. Money from this development would be used to fund the school rebuild. The proposal proved controversial as it appeared to contravene the will of Thomas Phillips Price who had "[left] the whole of his Essex estate to the nation in the interest of agriculture, arboriculture and forestry", and "[t]here is little public evidence that the charity has considered fully other options to raise money", having made a small profit in 2013. The most recent Ofsted report made no recommendation for a rebuild. The application was rejected by Essex County Council "with concerns over its financial viability and the availability of primary school places needed for the new homes"
