= Mary Honywood =

British co-heiress

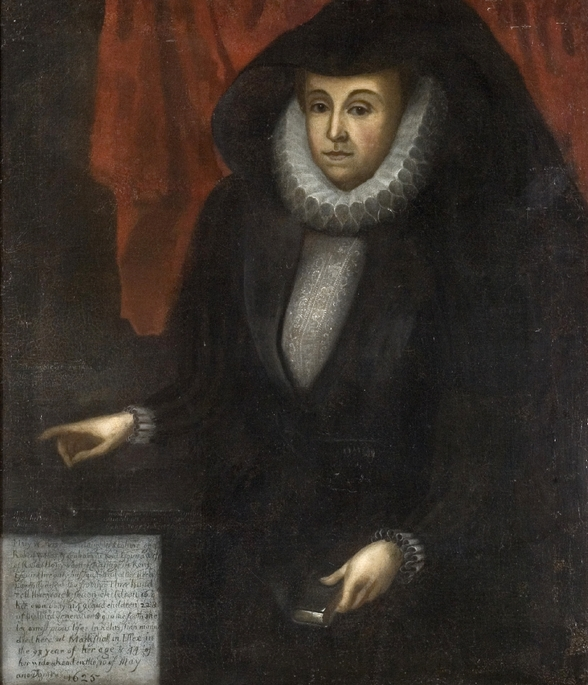
- Born: Mary Waters; 1527; Lenham in Kent
- Died: 11 May 1620 (92-93 years old); Marks Hall in Essex
- Spouse: Robert Honywood
- Children: 16
- Relatives: 367 living descendants in her lifetime

Mary Honywood or Mary Waters (1527 – 1620) was an English co-heiress who visited the Marian martyrs. She lived to have 114 grandchildren and, in total, 367 descendants in her lifetime.

== Life ==
Honywood was born in Lenham in Kent in 1527. She was a co-heiress of Robert Waters, and she married Robert Honywood who was to take up residence at Marks Hall in Essex. Honywood was recorded because she had over 360 descendants whom she saw in her lifetime. She achieved this by having sixteen children herself, who in turn had 114 grandchildren. In her lifetime they had 228 great-grandchildren and they had nine great-great-grandchildren. Honywood died at the age of 93.

Honywood was known for her work in the prisons looking after the people arrested for their Protestant beliefs. She sustained the Marian martyrs and wrote letters to John Bradford who was martyred for his beliefs in 1555. Honywood's compassion meant that she attended his execution to ensure that his death was quick.

Honywood died in Marks Hall, Essex in 1620. There was a plaque in Markshall church which recorded her pious life. The plaque said she was buried there, but in fact, she was buried with her husband in Lenham. The Markshall church was demolished in 1933, but Mary's monument was moved to the church of St Peter ad Vincula, Coggeshall.

== Legacy ==
Her grandson Michael Honywood, who became Dean of Lincoln, built the Wren Library at Lincoln Cathedral. The library contains his portrait and the portrait of his grandmother, of whom he was particularly proud. There are several other portraits, although one showing her with a Venetian glass was lost in the 19th century. According to the story, Mary Honywood replied to John Foxe, when he said that she would have a long life, that "as well might you have said … that if I should throw this glass against the wall, I might believe it would not break to pieces". She then threw the glass, but it failed to break.
