= Coggeshall Abbey =

Former abbey in Essex, England

Coordinates: 51°52′9″N 0°41′33″E

St. Nicholas Chapel
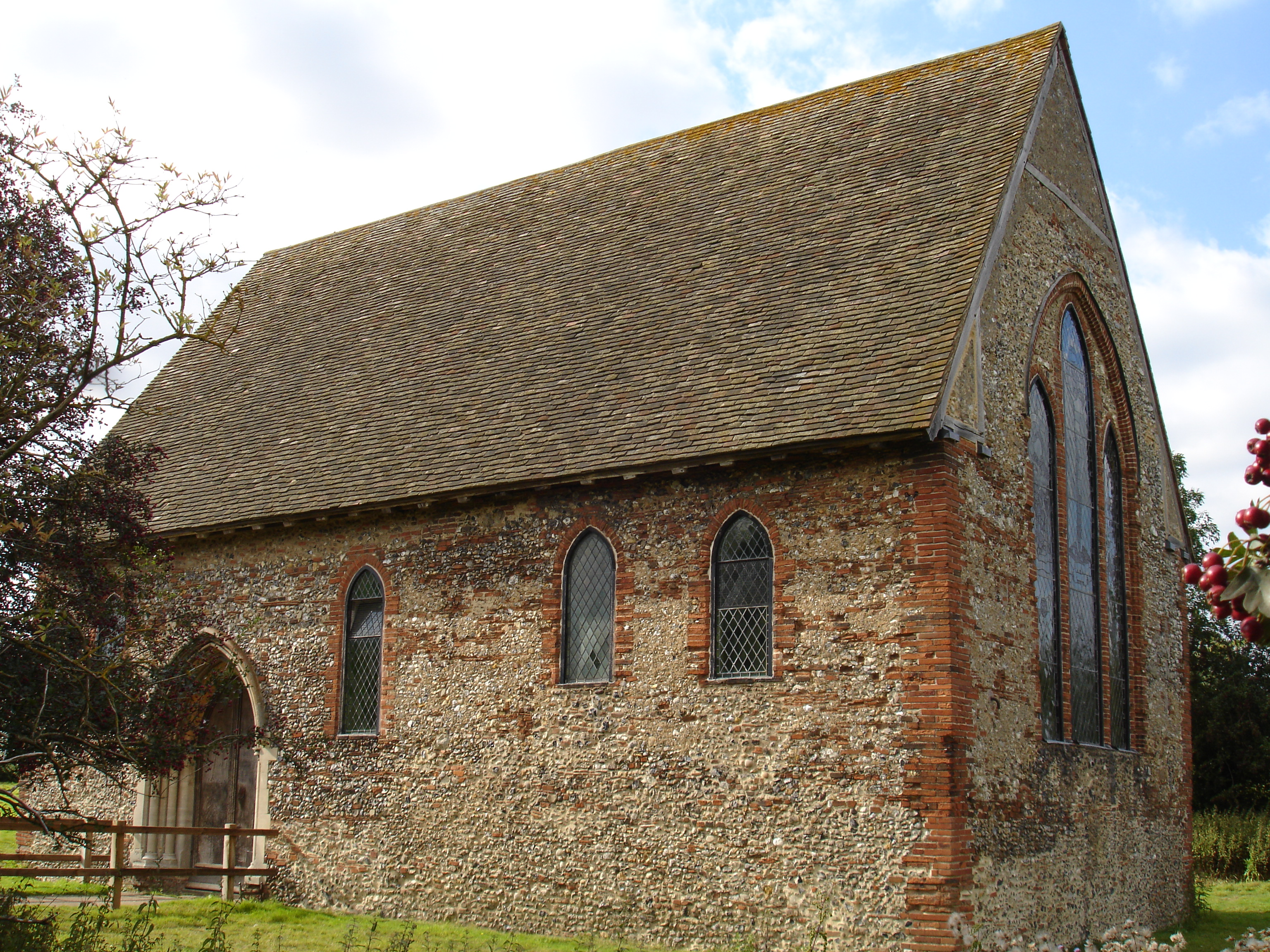
- The Abbey gate chapel belonging to Coggeshall Abbey, capella ante portas, now serving as St. Nicholas Chapel
- Interactive map of St. Nicholas Chapel

Monastery information
- Order: Cistercian
- Established: 1137-1142
- Disestablished: 1538
- Dedication: St. John the Baptist

People
- Founders: Gilbert Foliot and Simon de Toni

Architecture
- Status: Dissolved

Site
- Location: Coggeshall, Essex, United Kingdom
- Visible remains: Incorporated into St Nicholas' Church and Abbey Farm
- Public access: yes

Coggeshall Abbey, situated south of the town of Coggeshall in Essex, England was founded in 1140 by King Stephen and Queen Matilda, as a Savigniac house but became Cistercian in 1147 upon the absorption of the order.

== History ==
The abbey was founded in 1140 as the last of the seventeen Savigniac houses in England. Queen Matilda had inherited the land on which the abbey would be built from her father, Count Eustace III of Boulogne. From 1152 to 1160 the abbey was embroiled in a lawsuit arising from its attempts to remove a settlement from one of its estates. This practice of forced depopulation was associated with the Cistercian order, as they used it create open tracts of pasture and farmland. The case eventually went to the papal court. At this time the abbey buildings were under construction, with the church being dedicated in 1167. In 1216 an incident was recorded that "King John's army violently entered the abbey and carried off twenty-two horses of the bishop of London and others." It is also known that the reigning abbot in 1260 was travelling abroad as the envoy of the King. In the 13th century, like other Cistercian houses, the abbey grew wealthy from the wool trade. By 1370, however, the monastery was reported to be very poor, partly due to excessive spending and other mismanagement. Furthermore, during the so-called Peasants’ Revolt of 1381, the abbey was broken into and raided. The abbey's financial woes were compounded by the royal imposition of corrodians, favoured subjects who received pensions and lived in some style in the abbey precinct. The will of John Sharpe (courtier), dated 1518, indicates that he held a lease of "mansion and lodgings at Coggeshall Abbey". A similar later lease survives for Clement Harleston, granted in 1528, and shows that these buildings were next to the infirmary.

On the eve of the suppression of the monastery many, possibly false, charges were made against the abbot, William Love. In 1536 he was relieved of his duties and replaced by the more amenable Henry More, who offered little resistance to the impending Dissolution. The abbey was heavily in debt by the time of its closure in 1538, following which the site was sold to Sir Thomas Seymour. The abbey church was rapidly ransacked and demolished – it had gone by 1541, when Seymour exchanged the site for other lands. A house was built in 1581 on part of the monastery site by Anne Paycocke and her husband Richard Benton, and still stands. The surviving monastic buildings were converted for agricultural use, with the gate chapel and guest house serving as barns.

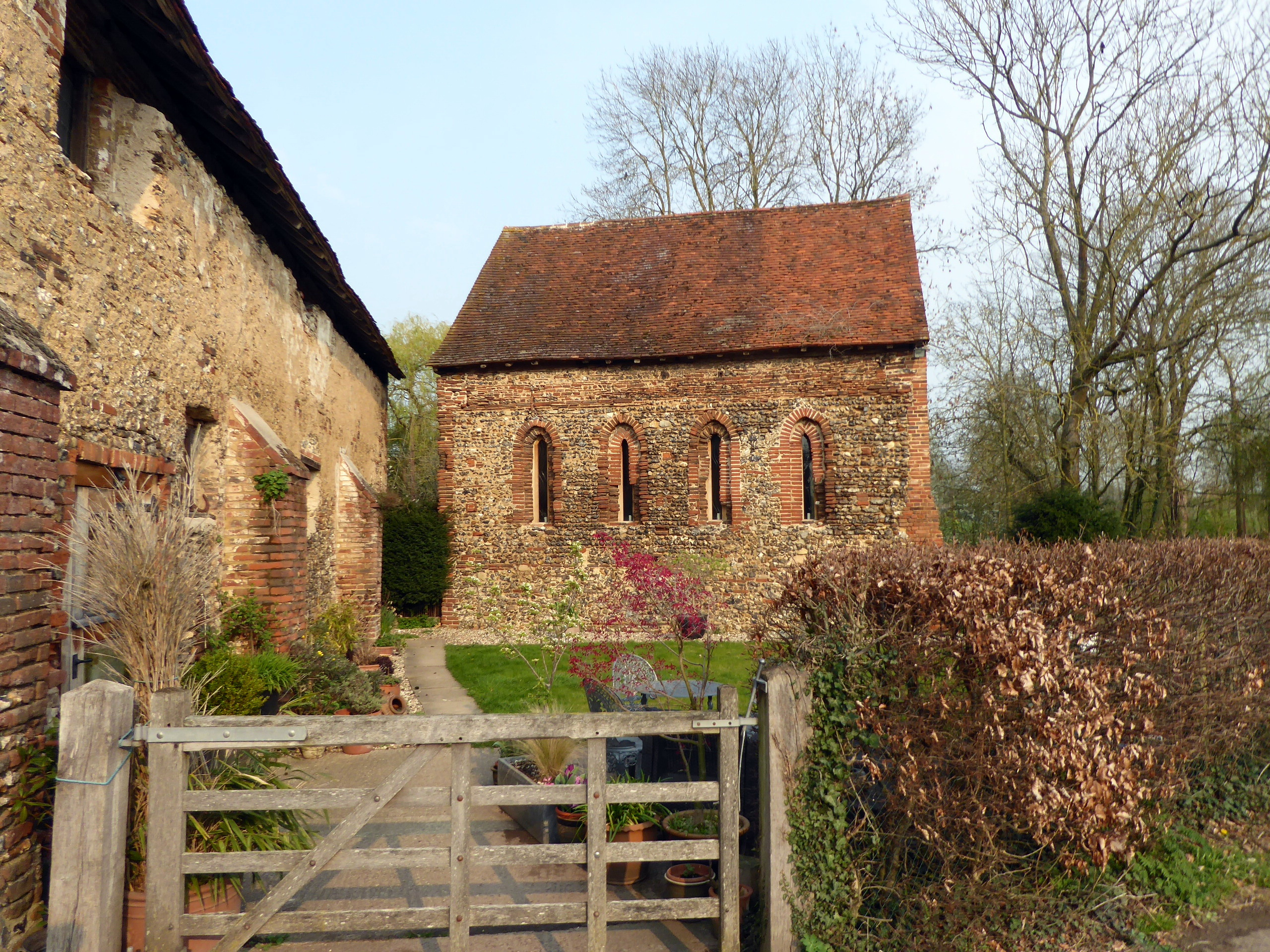
Purported guest house at Coggeshall Abbey

== Remains ==
The church, which was the abbey's most important building, was demolished soon after the Dissolution, but its plan has been recovered through excavation. In its final form, it was around 64m long. It was cruciform, with aisles to the nave and chancel (which was probably extended) and a large north chapel dedicated to St Catherine. The monks' domestic buildings were to the south of the church, in three ranges round a cloister. The south and west ranges, containing the refectory and the lay brothers' accommodation, have entirely vanished. The east range, which dates from the mid-12th century, survives in part, built into the present Abbey Farm. The northern end, which contained the chapter house, has been destroyed, but the dormitory undercroft survives, as do parts of the adjacent abbot's house and infirmary. The abbot's corridor retains original brick vaulting, and the abbot's dining hall, chamber and chapel survive. An unusual detached building south of the dormitory may have been the guest house. It includes some of the earliest post-Roman brickwork in the country. Its south wall was demolished to convert it for use as a barn, but regular brick windows remain in the side walls.

The buildings stood within a walled precinct that contained various service buildings. It was entered through a gatehouse, which had a chapel next to it, as was commonplace. This chapel survives in use as the Chapel of St Nicholas, though it served as a barn from the Reformation to the 19th century, and has been dated to the 1220s. It also includes early brickwork, formed into fine lancet windows. Grange Barn, a large 13th-century tithe barn, outlived the abbey and remained in use until the 1960s. It has since been restored and is now in the care of the National Trust.

== See also ==
- List of monastic houses in Essex
- List of abbeys and priories in England
- List of English abbeys, priories and friaries serving as parish churches
