= Jack Sharpe =

Jack Sharpe may refer to:

- Jack Sharpe (musician) (1930–1994), English jazz saxophonist and bandleader
- Jack Sharpe (songwriter) (1909–1996), American songwriter, music publishing executive and author
- Jack Sharpe (footballer) (1866–1936), English footballer
- St George Henry Rathbone who wrote under this pseudonym.

== See also ==
- Jack Sharp (disambiguation)
- John Sharpe (disambiguation)
