= Paycocke's House and Garden =

Historic house and gardens in Coggeshall, Essex, England

Paycocke's House and Gardens
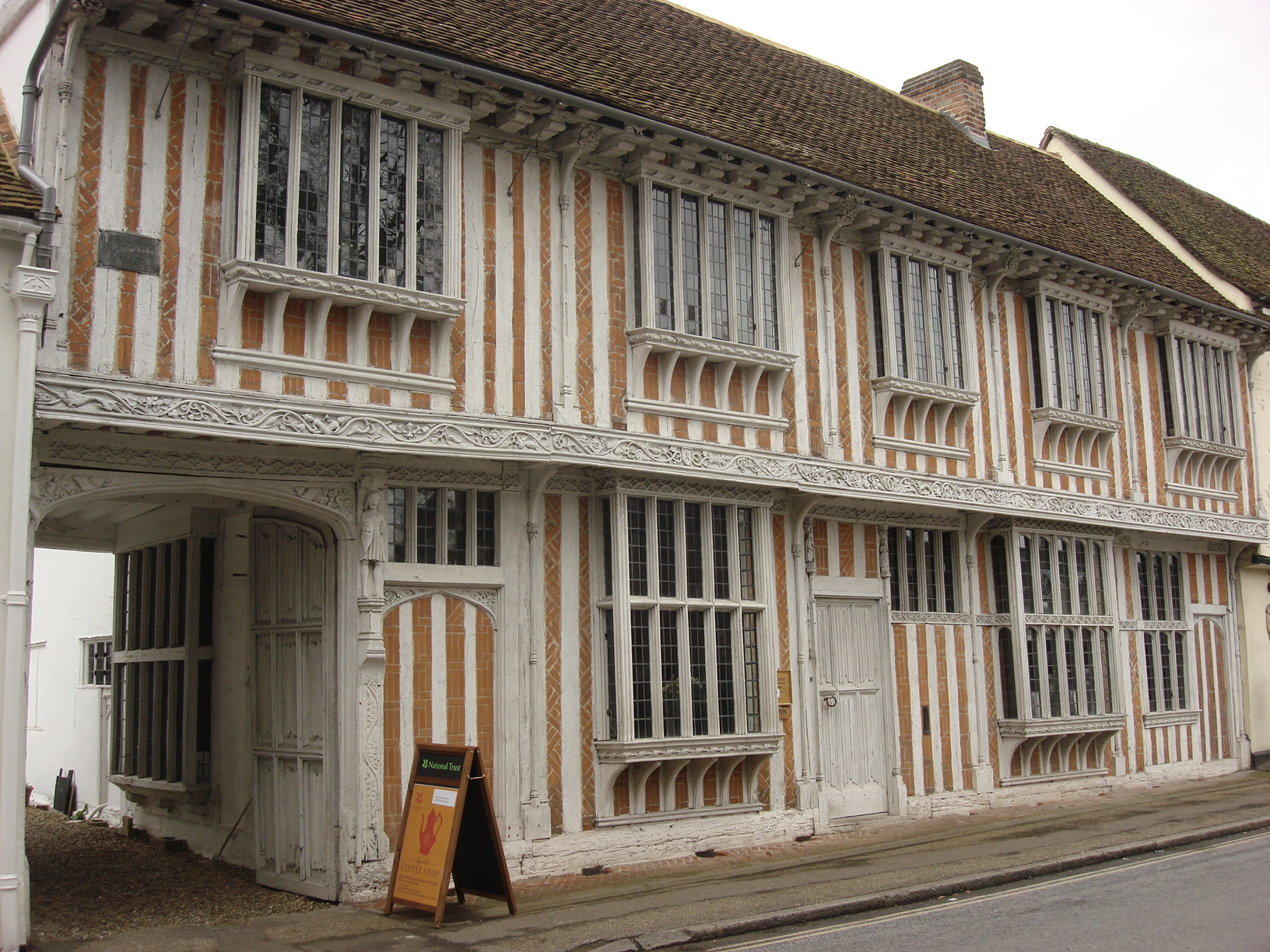
- Paycocke's House viewed from West Street, Coggeshall
- Interactive map of the Paycocke's House and Gardens area

General information
- Architectural style: Tudor
- Location: Coggeshall, Essex, England
- Coordinates: 51.8704°N 0.6827°E
- Completed: 1500
- Client: Thomas Paycocke
- Owner: National Trust

Listed Building – Grade I
- Official name: Paycocke's
- Designated: 2 May 1953
- Reference no.: 1337597

Paycocke's House and Garden is a surviving example of a Tudor merchant's house and garden in Coggeshall, Essex, England. The house was built for Thomas Paycocke, a wealthy cloth merchant in the town. The house was very nearly destroyed in the 19th century, but was rescued and restored by Lord Noel Buxton in the early 20th century, before being handed to the care of the National Trust.

The house has been described as an attractive half-timbered house, notable particularly for its intricate woodwork and carvings.

== History ==
Thomas Paycocke was a successful businessman in the later half of the 15th century. He has been described as an artisan, having made his money in a skilled craft. The wool trade was the dominant economic force in East Anglia, including in the town of Coggeshall, and Paycocke capitalised on this. The house was built from a medieval hall as a place for him to live as well as a place to process wool. It would also have served as a status symbol in Coggeshall due to the intricate nature of some of the details of the house.

The house was built outwards from an existing medieval building, which was owned by Thomas Paycocke's father, John Paycocke. John Paycocke himself was a relatively wealthy man, and built the original house in or around 1500 as a wedding present for his son Thomas and daughter-in-law Margaret. The initials T.P. and M.P. appear in the wood carvings that decorate the house. John Paycocke died in 1505, and the land was left to his children, and Thomas Paycocke added a new wing to the house in 1509. Records show that Thomas Paycocke remained a wealthy man. When he died in 1518, he left £1500 (equivalent to £1,339,555 in 2025) in cash bequests in his will, not including goods or property.

The house stayed in the Paycocke's family until the last male heir died in 1584. The house was subsequently sold to the Buxton family. In 1746, the Buxton family divided it into three smaller cottages and sold it off. The houses later fell into a state of disrepair.

In 1906, the historian G. F. Beaumont protested against the destruction of Paycocke's House. The house was sold to Lord Noel Buxton, a descendant of the Buxton family who bought the house in the 16th century. Buxton oversaw the restoration of the house, and restored a number of carvings. The house was left to the care of the National Trust.

== Gardens ==
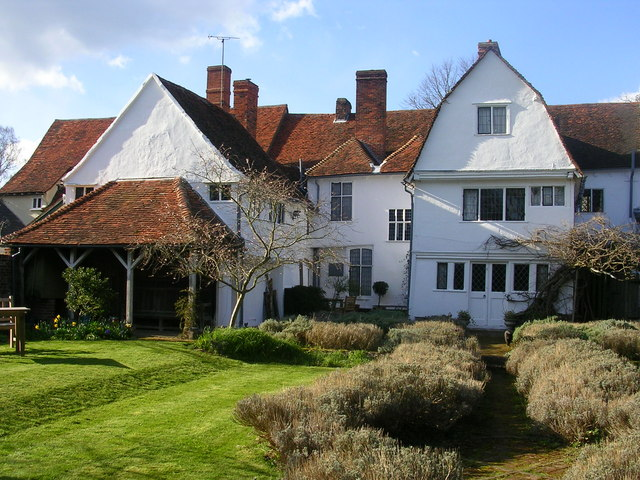
The view of the house from the restored Arts and Crafts garden

The site of the gardens had previously been an industrial yard used by Thomas Paycocke and other merchants in the town of Coggeshall. They were a significant part of Paycocke's House. The gardens had been reworked in an Arts and Crafts style by the Noel family.

The gardens were restored by the National Trust in the Arts and Crafts style from 2008.
