= Jack Sharp (disambiguation) =

Jack Sharp may refer to:

- Jack Sharp (1878-1938), English cricketer and footballer
- Jack Sharp (New Zealand footballer), New Zealand international football (soccer) player
- Jack Sharp (Scottish footballer) (fl. 1910s), Scottish footballer with Heart of Midlothian
- J. W. Sharp (c. 1818–1856), known as Jack, English singer and comic entertainer
- Aaron John Sharp (1904–1997), American botanist
- Jack Sharp, pen name of writer Andy Weir
- Jack Sharp (speedway rider) (1909–1974), Australian speedway rider

== See also ==
- Jack Sharpe (disambiguation)
- John Sharp (disambiguation)
