= Coggeshall Farm Museum =

Museum in Bristol, Rhode Island, US

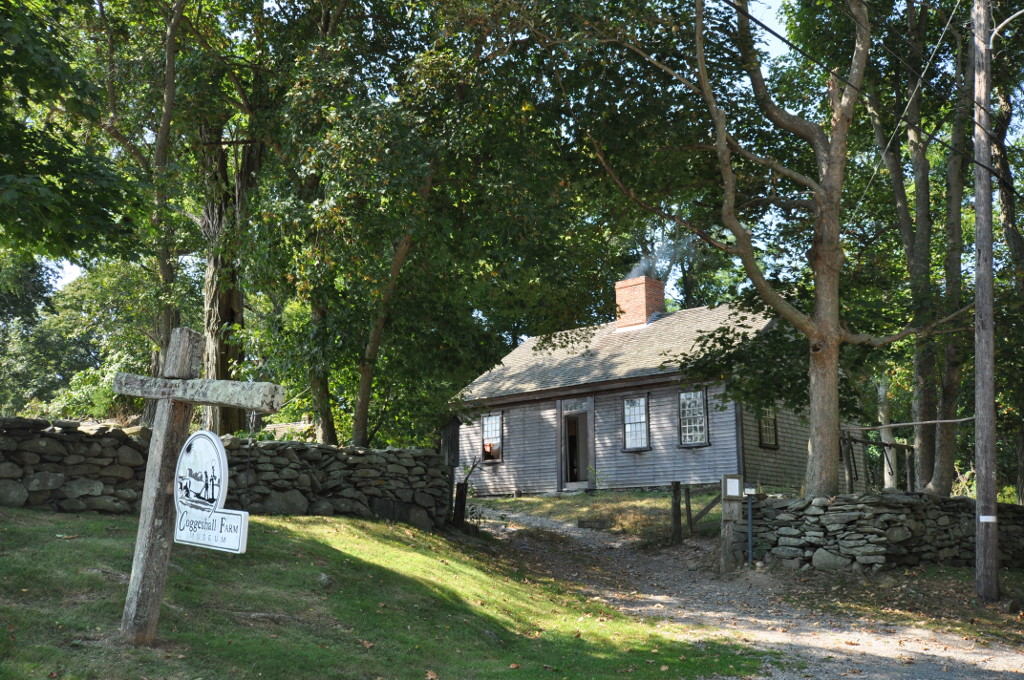
- Coggeshall Farm Museum
- Established: 1973
- Location: Colt State Park, Bristol, Rhode Island
- Coordinates: 41.673°N 71.297°W
- Type: Farm museum

Coggeshall Farm Museum is a non-profit farm museum in Colt State Park in Bristol, Rhode Island, U.S.A.

The eighteenth century coastal tenant farm is located on 48 acres of land in Bristol and features interpreters and authentic reenactments of farm life in the year 1799. In the early nineteenth-century Wilbur and Eliza Coggeshall were tenant farmers at the farm. The Coggeshalls' son, Chandler Coggeshall, later became a politician and helped to found what is now the University of Rhode Island in 1888. The farm later became part of the Colt Estate. In 1965 the State of Rhode Island purchased the Colt Estate for use as a state park, and the Bristol Historical Society petitioned the state for permission to preserve the farm house on the property as a museum. In 1968 the Bristol Historical Society signed a lease and constructed various outbuildings. Coggeshall Farm Museum was established in 1973 to educate modern Americans about eighteenth century New England farm life.
