= St Peter ad Vincula, Coggeshall =

Church in Essex, England

Coordinates: 51.874781°N 0.690423°E

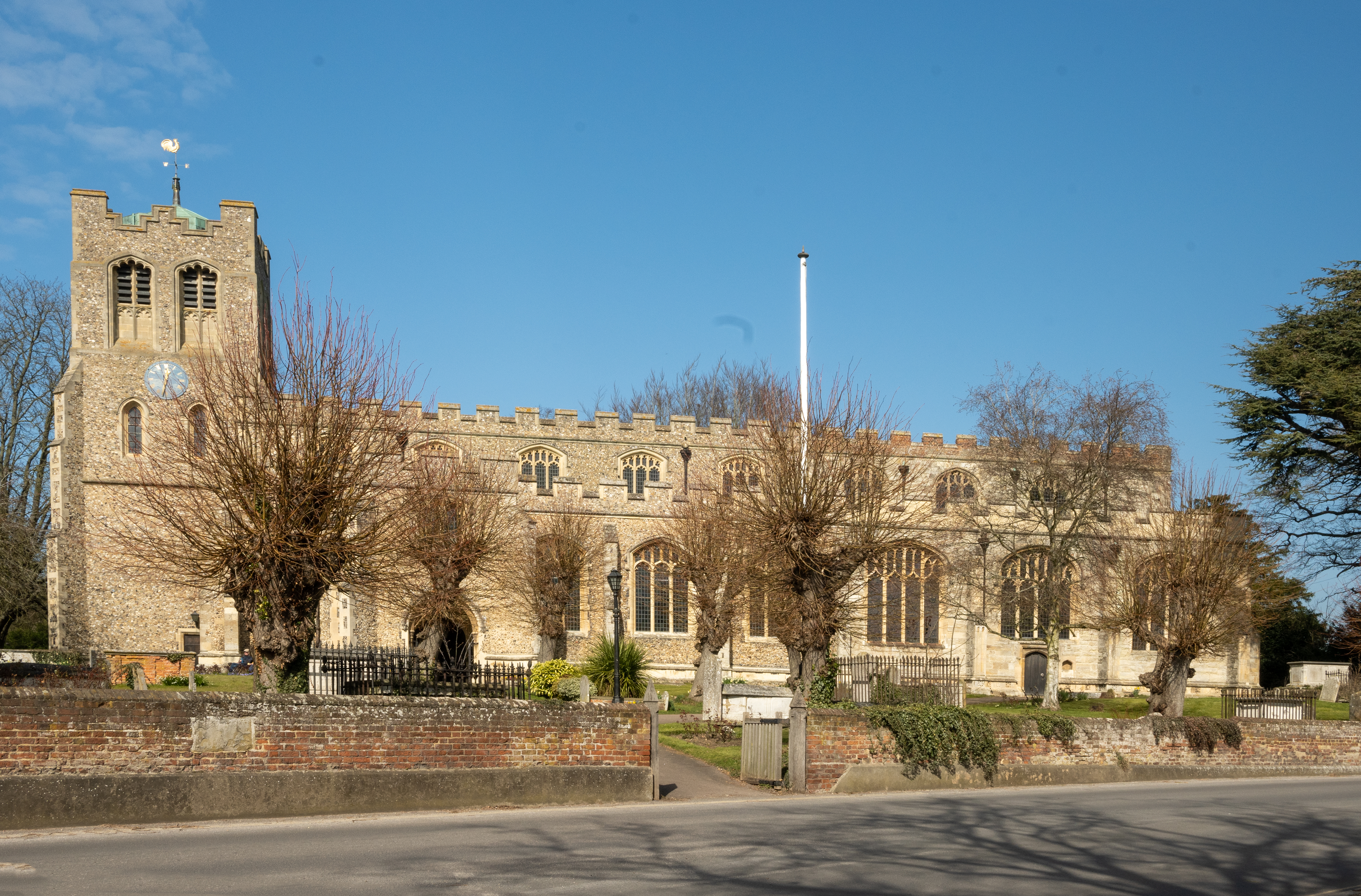
St Peter-ad-Vincula church, Coggeshall, Essex

St Peter ad Vincula ('St Peter in chains') in Coggeshall, Essex, is one of a group of oversized churches built following the success of the early wool-trade in the East Anglia area. It is Grade I listed.

The building now standing was completed in the first quarter of the 15th century, and sits on a site where both Saxon and Norman churches stood previously.

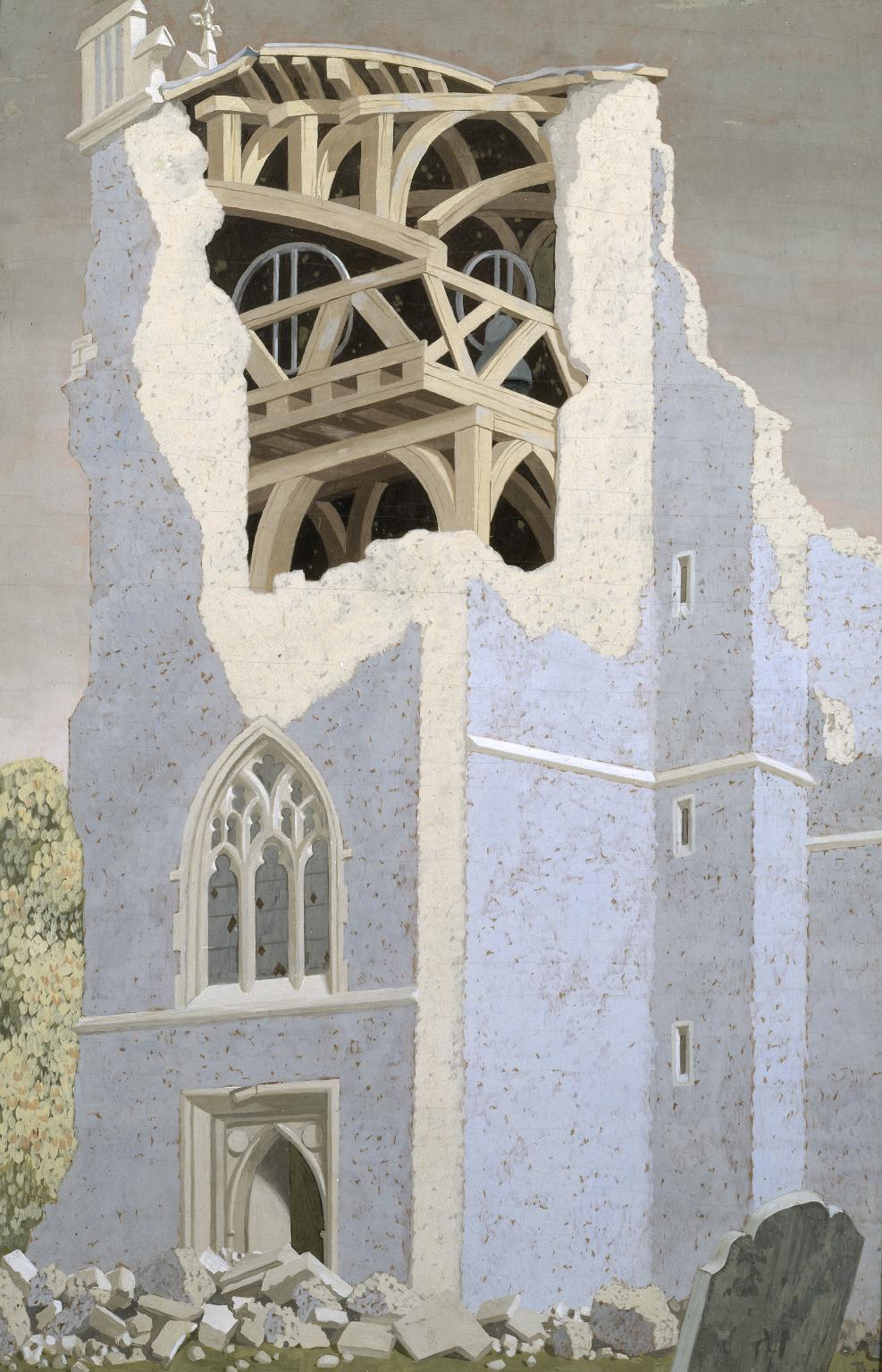
Painting by John Armstrong showing damage after a German bomb, 1940

When the nearby church at Marks Hall was demolished in 1933 some items were moved to this church, including the monument to Mary Honywood (b.1567-d.1630) which is now in the sacristy. She was celebrated for having 367 living descendants at the time of her death.
