= Coggeshall Hamlet =

Hamlet in Essex, England

Coordinates: 51°51′40″N 0°41′15″E

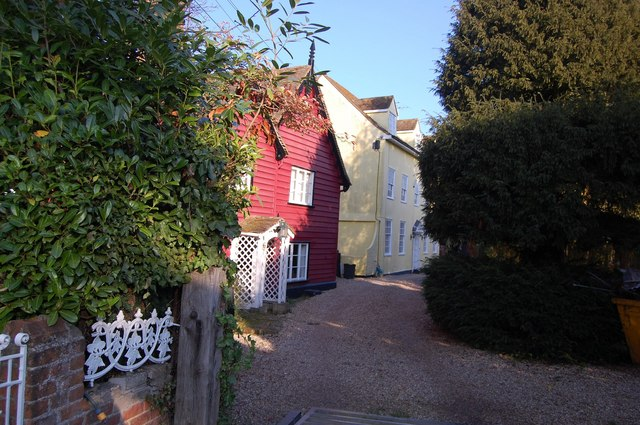

- Location within Essex
- Civil parish: Coggeshall
- District: Braintree
- Shire county: Essex
- Region: East
- Country: England
- Sovereign state: United Kingdom
- Police: Essex
- Fire: Essex
- Ambulance: East of England

Coggeshall Hamlet is a hamlet in the civil parish of Coggeshall, in the Braintree district of Essex, England. The hamlet is less than one mile (1.6 km) south from the small market town of Coggeshall, and is on the B1024 road south from the A120. The River Blackwater flows at the east of the hamlet. The George at Kelvedon is 800 yards (700 m) south from the hamlet on the B1024.
