= Grange Barn, Coggeshall =

Historic timber-framed building in Coggeshall, Essex, England

Grange Barn
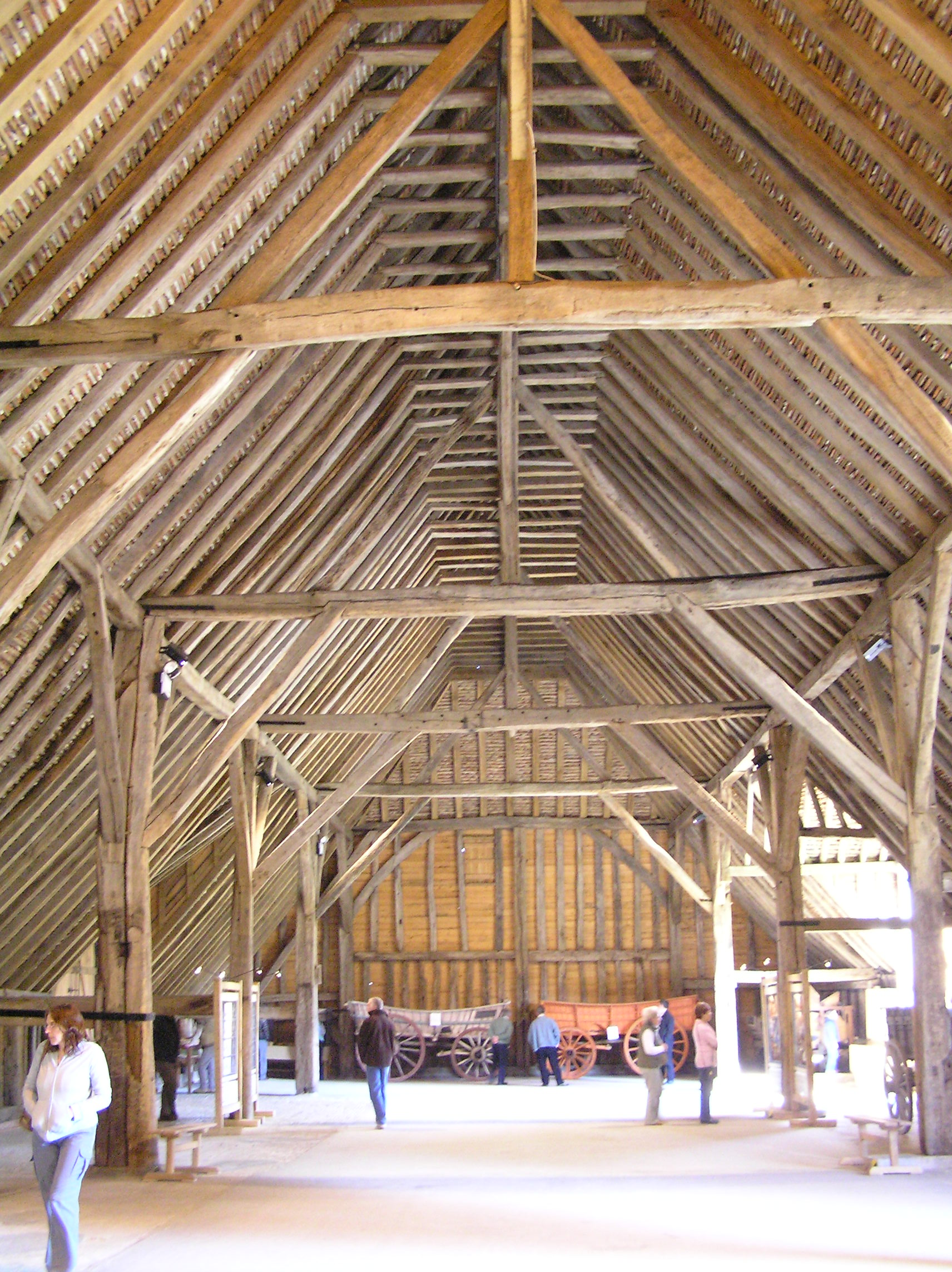
- Coggeshall Grange Barn, one of the oldest surviving timber framed buildings in Europe
- Interactive map of the Grange Barn area

General information
- Location: 51.8679°N 0.6842°E, United Kingdom
- Construction started: 13th Century A. D.

Listed Building – Grade I
- Designated: 1966
- Reference no.: 1123112

Grange Barn is a historic timber-framed building in Coggeshall, Essex, England. Grange Barn was built by the Cistercians in the 13th century to serve Coggeshall Abbey. It underwent significant structural alteration in the 14th century. It is Grade I listed.

== Architecture ==
The barn is 36.57 metres long, 13.71 metres wide and 10.67 metres high. For comparison, England's largest medieval barn, Harmondsworth Great Barn, is 58.55 metres long, 11.3 metres wide, and 11.9 metres high. The barn has a nave and two aisles. There are two midstreys (gabled porches) which would have provided access for wagons: these are 18th century.

== History ==
According to Historic England, Grange Barn is of "C12/early C13 origin". However it is generally accepted that it is slightly younger than the Barley Barn, also in Essex and dated to c. 1220, which has a claim to being the oldest timber-framed building in the country.

Grange Barn is about quarter of a mile from the site of Coggeshall Abbey, which was founded in 1140. Since the dissolution of the Abbey in the 1530s, most of its buildings have disappeared, but the barn remained in continual agricultural use up until 1960 when it was left derelict.

== Conservation ==
Grange Barn was listed in the 1960s, and in 1982 it was compulsorily purchased by Braintree District Council, after pressure from a local group which also initiated the restoration of the building, the work being completed in 1985. The restoration received a Europa Nostra award. In 1989 the barn was given to the National Trust for its future preservation. The intention is to present the structure as it was in the 14th century.

== Access ==
Grange Barn is open to the public with a display explaining the history of the Barn, as well as a collection of woodworking tools used by a local craftsman. It is available to hire for special events.
