= John Sharp (English politician) =

English politician (1678–1727)

John Sharp (18 June 1678 – 9 March 1727) was an English Tory politician and lawyer who sat as MP for Ripon from December 1701 till 1715. He was classified as "Low Church".

== Family and education ==
He was the first son of Archbishop of York, John Sharp and Elizabeth Palmer. He was educated at Coneyhatch school, Leeds School and Christ's College, Cambridge in 1693, he earned an MA in 1695, he entered the Inner Temple in 1698 and was called to the bar in 1703. His marriage to Anne Maria, the daughter of Charles Hosier was licensed on 15 August 1710 with £4000. They had one son.

== Political career ==
In the February 1701 general election, Ripon borough leaders asked John's father, the Archbishop of York, John Sharp to support him as MP. In the December 1701 general election, Sharp was nominated and elected MP for Ripon alongside John Aislabie. On 1 March 1702, he is reported to have spoken against closer union with Scotland. In 1702, he was re-elected unopposed for Ripon. On 28 November 1704, he did not support the Tack (an attempt to attach the Occasional Conformity Bill onto a Money Bill), likely because his father considered it unconstitutional. In 1705, he was re-elected unopposed. On 25 October 1705, he voted against the Court (Whig) candidate for Speaker, John Smith. On 4 December 1705, he spoke again on the proposed union with Scotland. In 1708, he was re-elected for Ripon after a contested election. On 10 December 1709, he acted as teller supporting Allen Bathurst, 1st Earl Bathurst in the Cirencester election dispute. On 11 January 1710, he supported recommitting the impeachement articles against Henry Sacheverell. On 24 March 1710, he opposed a motion to burn Sacheverell's sermon.

In 1710, he was elected unopposed. In 1711, he is listed among Tory "patriots" who opposed continuing the War of the Spanish Succession and was identified as a member of the October Club. In January 1712, he renewed his efforts to obtain toleration for Scottish Episcopalians. On 10 April 1712, he acted as teller supporting George Hamilton in an election dispute. In July 1712, he was officially appointed to the Irish Revenue Commission through the patronage of Robert Harley, 1st Earl of Oxford and Earl Mortimer. In February 1713, he was appointed to the Board of Trade with a salary of £1,000 per year. On 18 June 1713, he voted for the French Commerce Bill. From 1711 till 1713, he invested heavily in South Sea Company stock and purchased 11 burgages in Ripon.

In 1713, he was elected unopposed for Ripon and was re-elected in March 1714. On 22 April 1714, he spoke in support of the peace settlement negotiated at the end of the War of the Spanish Succession. In summer 1714, as a Lord of Trade, he participated in investigations into Arthur Moore, whom was accused of private trading. In December 1714, he was removed from the Board of Trade after the Hanoverian Succession and was defeated at Ripon by a Whig candidate supported by John Aislabie. After 1714, he sold his Ripon burgages to Aislabie and ceased involvement in Ripon affairs.

== Death ==
He died on 9 March 1727 at Grafton Park and was buried at Wicken.
