= Gager =

Gager may refer to:

- Gager (municipality), in the Vorpommern-Rügen district, in Mecklenburg-Vorpommern, Germany
- C. Stuart Gager (1873–1943), American botanist
- John Gager (born 1937), American academic
- William Gager (1555–1622), English jurist
- Gager, Croatia, a hamlet on Pag
