= Coggeshall =

Market town in Essex, England

Coordinates: 51.8717°N 0.6913°E

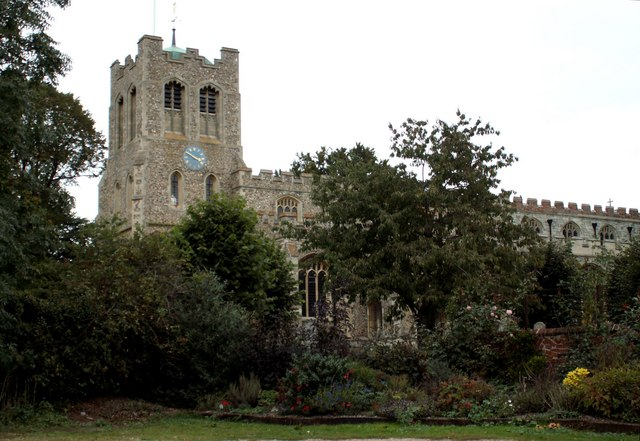
- Parish Church of St Peter ad Vincula

- Location within Essex
- Population: 4,660 (Parish, 2021); 3,810 (Built up area, 2021)
- OS grid reference: TL853226
- Civil parish: Coggeshall
- District: Braintree
- Shire county: Essex
- Region: East
- Country: England
- Sovereign state: United Kingdom
- Post town: COLCHESTER
- Postcode district: CO6
- Dialling code: 01376
- Police: Essex
- Fire: Essex
- Ambulance: East of England
- UK Parliament: Witham

Coggeshall (/ˈkɒksəl/ or /ˈkɒɡɪʃəl/) is a market town and civil parish in the Braintree district of Essex, England. It lies between Braintree and Colchester on the Roman road of Stane Street and the River Blackwater. At the 2021 census the parish had a population of 4,660 and the built up area had a population of 3,810.

It has almost 300 listed buildings and a market whose charter was granted in 1256 by King Henry III.

== Toponymy ==
The meaning the name of Coggeshall is uncertain. The -hall indicates a nook of land or a small valley, but there are conflicting theories as to the meaning of the first part of the name. Different pronunciations and spellings have been used throughout its history. The name appears as Kockeshale around the year 1060. while the first element may be an Old English personal name (Cocc or Cogg). Margaret Gelling associated the name Coggeshall with the landscape in which it is situated, believing that -hall comes from Anglo-Saxon healh, meaning a nook or hollow, thus rendering the name as "Cogg's nook" (with Cogg as a proper name), corresponding to Coggeshall's sunken position in the 150-foot contour line.

The Domesday Book from 1086 addresses the Town as Cogheshala and it is mentioned elsewhere as Cogshall, Coxal, Coggashæl'' and Gogshall. Coggeshall has also been called Sunnydon, referenced in 1224 as an alias for the Market Town.

Beaumont brought together several theories for the name in his 1890 book A History of Coggeshall, in Essex.

1. Weever 1631 wrote about a monument found on "Coccillway", thought that Coccill was a Lord of the area in Roman days and a corruption of the name led to Coggeshall.
2. the largely discredited antiquarian Alfred John Dunkin thought that it was a concatenation of two Celtic words – Cor or Cau with Gafæl, enclosure hold; or Cœd and Cær or Gær, camp in a wood, "Cogger", the person owning this camp may have had a hall, therefore Coggershall.
3. Philip Morant opined that the name was a corruption of Cocks-hall, with the seal of the Abbey featuring three cockerels. This may also be supported by Beaumont's suggestion that the first parish church, like the current one, was dedicated to Saint Peter, and the cockerel was used as a sign of this dedication.
4. Beaumont also reasons that the name may have come from the red-coloured shrub the Coccus, whose colour is pronounced Coch; many Ancient Britons had names related to colours.

== History ==
Coggeshall dates back at least to an early Saxon settlement, though the area has been settled since the Mesolithic period. There is evidence of a Roman villa or settlement (Noviomagus Icenorum) before then and the town lies on Stane Street, which may have been built on a much earlier track. The drainage aqueducts of Stane Street are still visible in the cellar of the Chapel Inn today. Roman coins dating from 31 BC to AD 395 have been found in the area and Coggeshall has been considered the site of a Roman station mentioned in the Itineraries of Antoninus. Coggeshall is situated at a ford of the River Blackwater, part of another path running from the Blackwater Valley to the Colne Valley. Where these paths crossed a settlement started.

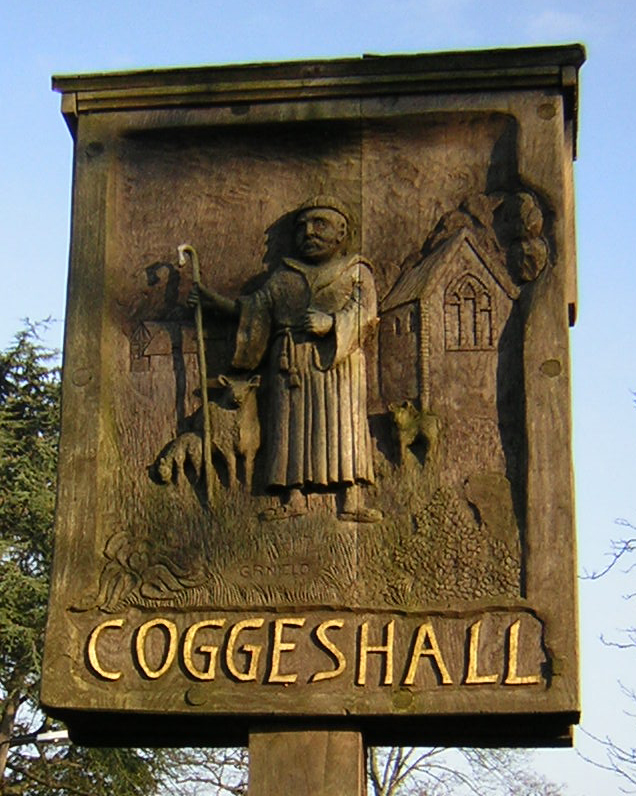
The town sign depicts a Cistercian farming sheep at the abbey. On the other side is a weaver by his loom.

The vill of Coggeshall is mentioned as Cogheshala in the Domesday Book of 1086 within the Witham hundred of Essex. The vill was subdivided into three manors, each in different ownership, the most valuable of which was owned by Eustace, Count of Boulogne, who had acquired that manor since the Norman Conquest. At that time, Coggeshall had "a mill; about 60 men with ploughs and horses, oxen and sheep; woodland with swine and a swineherd, four stocks of bees and one priest".

A priest was mentioned in the Domesday Book, suggesting Coggeshall was already a parish. The parish church, dedicated to St Peter ad Vincula ("St Peter in chains"), was rebuilt in the 15th century.

Around 1140, King Stephen and his queen Matilda, founded Coggeshall Abbey on the south bank of the River Blackwater. It was a large Savigniac abbey with 12 monks from Savigny in France. the last to be established before the order was absorbed by the Cistercians in 1147. Matilda visited the abbey for the last time in 1151 and asked for the abbot's blessing, "If thou should never see my face again, pray for my soul. More things are wrought by prayer than this world dreams of."

Flint and rubble were the main materials used in the construction of the monastery, and the buildings were faced with stone punted up the Blackwater, and locally produced brick. Brick making had died out in Britain since the Romans left and the monks may have been instrumental in its re-establishment around this time. They built a kiln in the north of the town at a place called Tile Kiln, an area now known as Tilkey. The bricks from Coggeshall are some of the earliest-known bricks in post-Roman Britain. Long Bridge, in the south of the Town, was probably built in the 13th century using these bricks and the kiln in Tilkey continued to produce bricks until 1845. The Church was sufficiently complete to be dedicated by the Bishop of London in 1167.

The estate commanded by the monastery was extensive. The monks farmed sheep, and their skilled husbandry developed a high-quality wool that formed the foundation of the Town's prosperous cloth trade during the 15th to mid-18th centuries, when it was particularly renowned for its fine Coggeshall White cloth. The monastery also had fishponds with strict fishing rights – a vicar of Coggeshall was imprisoned in Colchester for stealing fish. However, the monastery could not produce all that it required and sold produce at an annual fair to buy the things they did not have. In 1250 the Abbot of Coggeshall was allowed by Royal Charter to hold an eight-day fair commencing on 31 July – the feast of St. Peter-ad-Vincula, to whom the Parish Church was dedicated. In 1256, a Saturday market was granted as long as it didn't interfere with its neighbours. Colchester complained in 1318 that Coggeshall was a hindrance, and their complaint, being upheld, resulted in the market being moved to Thursday, where it remains to this day.

The Black Death hit the abbey hard, with the number of monks and conversi much reduced. Revenues across Essex fell to between one third to one half of pre-plague rates; the abbey suffered financially with tenanted and cultivated lands heavily decreased. During the Peasants' Revolt of 1381 the Abbey was broken into and pillaged. The sheriff of Essex and Hertfordshire, John Sewall, was targeted by rioters at his Coggeshall house, now the Chapel Inn. By the early 15th century a new church was begun at the abbey called St Mary's; it was completed by the start of the 16th century but the Dissolution of the Monasteries brought an end to the prosperity of monks. In 1530 Abbot Love was demoted with a list of complaints raised against him; though some of them may have been fabricated, it appears that standards at the monastery were dropping. It was common practice at the time that abbots unsympathetic to the will of the king were replaced with more favourable ones; in this case Abbot More was supplanted by Dr. T. Leigh. Coggeshall survived the Act of Suppression in 1536 and the Abbot of St. Mary Grace's, London, invested in its future. However, the political situation was opposed to the monasteries and Coggeshall succumbed in 1538, handed over by Abbot More. The monks were sent back to their families or into the community, many becoming priests. Abbot Love became vicar of Witham where he stayed until his death in 1559. The monastery's possessions and lands, totalling nearly 50,000 acres (200 km^{2}), were seized; King Henry VIII granted them to Sir Thomas Seymour. They remained in his possession until 1541 when they were split up.

In 1086 the Domesday Book had recorded Coggeshall in the hundred of Witham. Following the founding of the abbey, the parish came to be administered in two parts: Little Coggeshall, covering the part of the parish south of the River Blackwater, which included the abbey and Coggeshall Hamlet; and Great Coggeshall, covering the part of the parish north of the river, which included the main part of the Town and the parish church. Great Coggeshall became part of the Lexden hundred, whilst Little Coggeshall remained in Witham hundred. Coggeshall remained a single parish for ecclesiastical purposes, but Great Coggeshall and Little Coggeshall served as separate civil parishes for the purposes of administering the poor laws.

The civil parishes of Great and Little Coggeshall were reunited in 1949, when they and the neighbouring parish of Markshall to the north were merged into a new civil parish of Coggeshall, subject to some adjustments to the boundaries with neighbouring parishes.

=== Economy and industry ===
After the decline of the wool trade, Coggeshall's economy centred around cloth, silk and velvet, with over half of the population employed in its production. The cloth trade is first linked with the town in 1557 as a well-established industry but the onslaught of various trade laws brought about the decline of the trade. The last book order entry for cloth production is listed as 14 November 1800.

The 1851 census showed Coggeshall to be one of the most industrialised places in Essex. However, the English silk industry was being artificially supported by a ban on imported silk goods; Continental silk was cheaper and of a higher quality. When Parliament repealed the ban in 1826 and later reduced and finally removed duties on French silk, English weavers were unable to compete and Coggeshall's economy was devastated.

The town again found fame in Tambour lace, a form of lace-making introduced to Coggeshall around 1812 by a Monsieur Drago and his daughters. The production of this lace continued through the 19th century before dying out after the Second World War. Examples of Coggeshall lace have been worn by Queen Mary and Queen Elizabeth II.

Coggeshall was noted for the quality of its brewing, in the late 19th century having four well-established institutions. In 1888 Gardner and Son were awarded the Diploma of Honour at the National Brewer's Exhibition. The brewery buildings have undergone alternative use in recent years, with several now used a residential buildings and another used as the Coggeshall Village Hall. In 2008 the Red Fox Brewery was opened near Coggeshall.

By the end of the 19th century gelatine and isinglass production was well established at a site on West Street, production continued until ceasing in the late 1980s.

In the mid-19th century John Kemp King established seed growing in the area where it continues to this day. The seed growing industry is said to have originally started with the Cistercian monks at the abbey.

=== Nonconformist chapels ===
The first independent place of worship in Coggeshall was a converted barn on East Street, put to use in 1672. In 1710 a permanent chapel was built on Stoneham Street for "Protestant Dissenters from the Church of England, commonly called Independents". By 1716 there were 700 hearers including some of the wealthiest and most influential people from the local area. In 1834 the chapel was enlarged and again in 1865. Today the building continues to be part of the United Reformed Church in continuous succession from its Congregational and Independent past. The modern Christ Church which meets in the building is now a Local Ecumenical Partnership (LEP); a new single congregation coming together from a union of the three chapels in 1989 and uniting members from the Baptist Union, the Methodist Church, and the United Reformed Church.

The Quakers were active in Coggeshall as early as 1655, with Fox stating "I came to Cogshall, and there was a meeting of about 2,000 people." That same year James Parnell, a Quaker, caused a disturbance at the church and was sentenced to prison at Colchester Castle where he died whilst imprisoned in 1656. A meeting house was purchased on Stoneham Street in 1673 with a new building constructed in 1878. A graveyard was purchased on Tilkey Road in 1856 but now forms part of a private garden attached to Quaker Cottage. The meeting house is now home to Coggeshall Library.

Coggeshall has proved an important place in the local Baptist Ministry. For many years congregations met in a house just off Hare Bridge, and in 1797 the first annual meeting of the Essex Baptist Association was held in the Independent Meeting House. A permanent meeting house was constructed in 1825 along Church Street. This building is now used as business offices.

The Methodists have been present in Coggeshall since 1811, worshipping first at a house on Stoneham Street, then a chapel on East Street. A permanent chapel was constructed in 1883 on Stoneham Street to seat 250 people and now hosts a local children's nursery.

=== Post reformation Catholics ===
The Catholic parish established in Kelvedon provided for the small Coggeshall catholic community in the Victorian period. In 1914 eleven Catholics were recorded as living in Coggeshall. A permanent oratory was established at White Barn in 1919, with a Mass held at Starling Leeze, the residence of Captain and Mrs Dixon, from 1922. In 1923 a Mass was held at the Hitcham School every third Sunday using a portable altar, with the closure of this venue the Assembly Room above the Co-operative store was used. In 1927 the congregation had grown to thirty. Captain Kenneth Dixon R.N. died in 1927 and a site for a permanent place of worship was bought in his memory on Stoneham Street, for £200. The chapel of ease, St Bernard's of Clairvaux, was opened on Sunday 19 February 1928 with Bishop Doubleday blessing the building. By the 1930s there were seventy people in weekly attendance and by the 1960s the original building was considered to be too small for worship.

== Geography ==
Coggeshall is situated on top of a large deposit of London Clay. The main river is the Blackwater with the local Robin's Brook feeding into it. Beaumont mentions that there are good bore holes. The current course of the river was dug by the monks, with the original course running to the north. There is a small stream called the 'backditch' that follows the original route of the river.

== Demography ==
| | 1861 | 1881 | 1901 | 1921 | 1941 | 1961 | 1981 | 2001 | 2011 | 2021 |
|---|---|---|---|---|---|---|---|---|---|---|
| Population | 4198 | 3361 | | | | | | 3919 | 4727 | 4660 |
| Number of houses | | 765 | | | | | | | 2039 | |

== Landmarks ==
St Nicholas' Chapel, Coggeshall Abbey's gatehouse chapel, survived the Dissolution of the Monasteries intact, albeit converted into a barn. Subsequently, restored in 1863, it is the oldest surviving post-Roman brick building in the country (c. 1220). The original bricks from the ruins of the abbey are older still, and were made by the monks themselves. These were previously believed to be the oldest post-Roman bricks in the country; however, newer evidence suggests that brick making was not reintroduced to Britain by the Cistercians, but that there was already a brick making industry around Coggeshall in the early 12th century, prompted by the exhaustion of the supply of recyclable Roman bricks.

The Church of St Peter-ad-Vincula (St Peter in chains) is built on an earlier Norman church. It is one of the largest churches in Essex (internal dimensions of 134 ft 6 in by 62 ft 9 in, or 41m by 19m; the tower reaches a height of 72 ft or 22m) and was considered as a possible choice for cathedral, with Chelmsford Cathedral eventually being chosen. The present church was built in the perpendicular style with 'wool money' during the first quarter of the 15th century; its unusual size is testament to the affluence of the town at the time. Restoration work was carried out during the 19th century. During the Second World War, on 16 September 1940, the Luftwaffe bombed the church causing the roof of the nave to collapse and significant structural damage; repairs were completed in 1956.

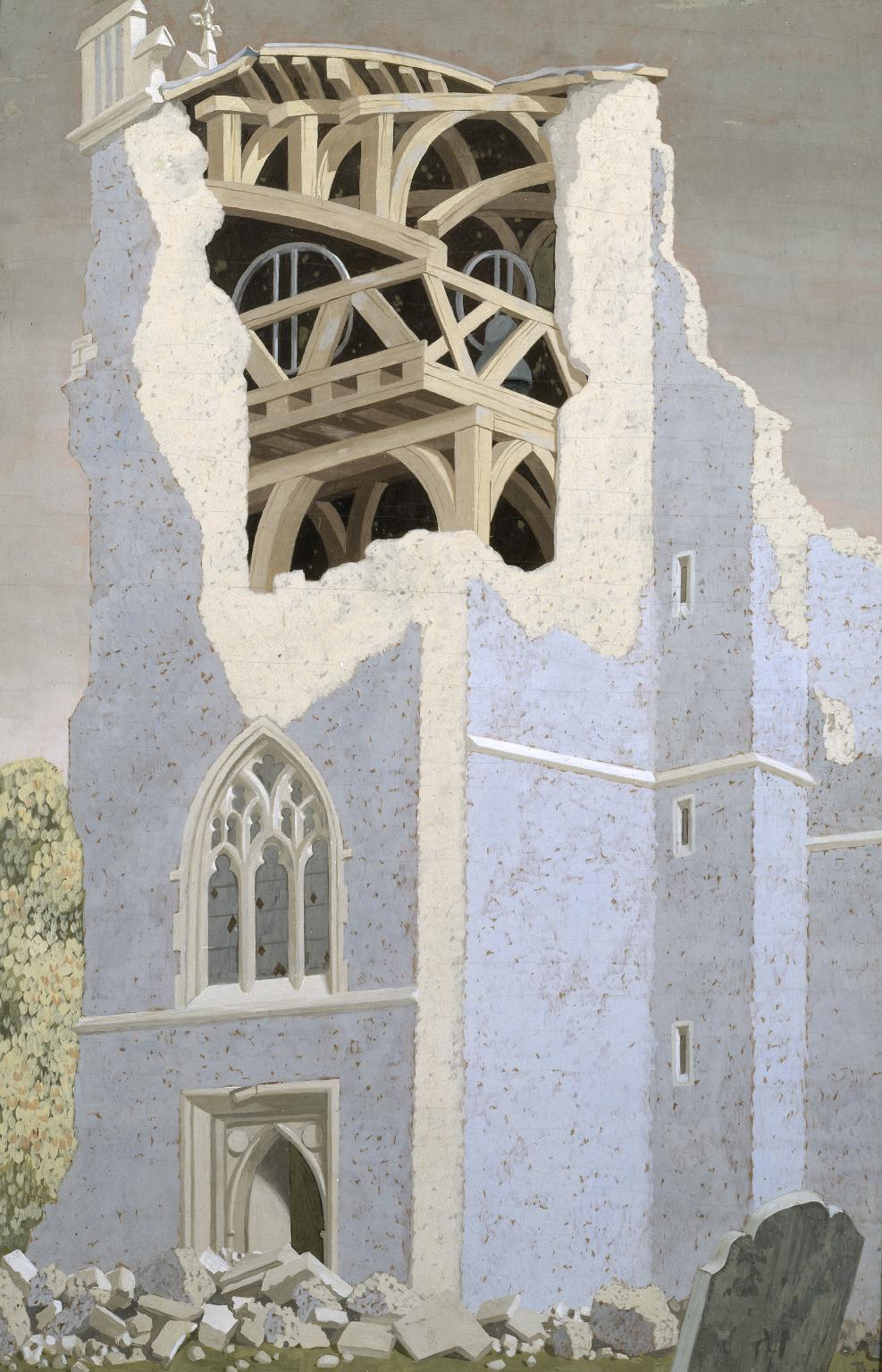
Coggeshall Church by John Armstrong, 1940, showing bomb damage

To celebrate the Millennium two new bells were purchased, bringing the total to ten. Coggeshall hosts the fifth heaviest peal in Essex, the heaviest four being (in descending order) Waltham Abbey, Chelmsford Cathedral, All Saints’ Writtle and All Saints’ West Ham.

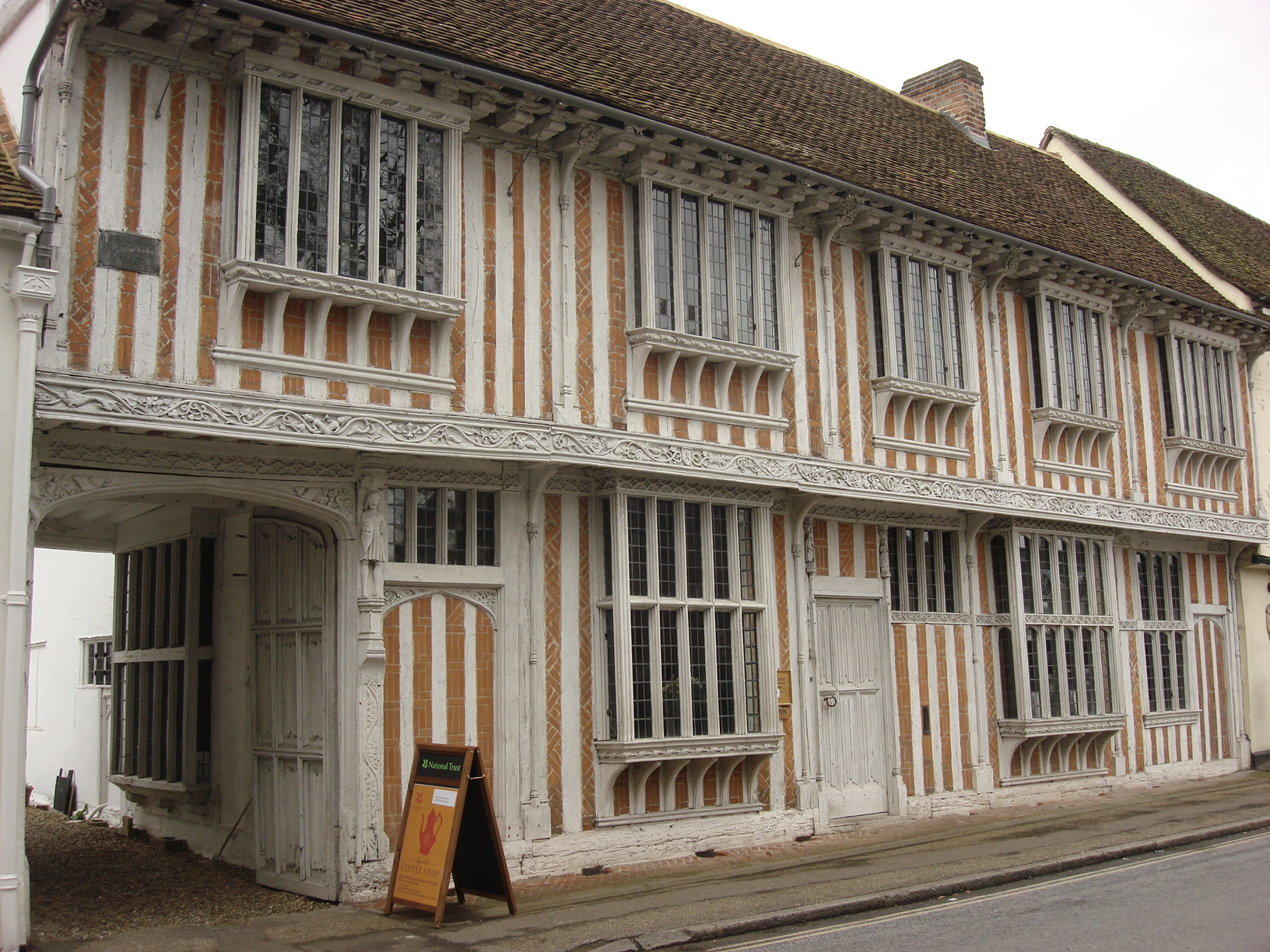
Paycocke's House in Coggeshall

Paycocke's House was built in or around 1500 by John Paycocke (d. 1505); it is thought it was built as a wedding present for his son Thomas and daughter-in-law Margaret as the initials T.P. and M.P. appear in the wood carvings that decorate the house. The house features elaborate wood panelling and carvings, a testament to the wealth generated by the wool trade in East Anglia. It also features gates which some think were taken from the Abbey at the time of its dissolution.

The Paycocke family moved into Coggeshall in the 15th century and exemplified a trend for successful butchers to acquire large flocks of their own sheep which would produce wool as well as meat. The wool could be used to make cloth and often the 'grazing butchers' would eventually evolve into clothiers. These merchants frequently became very wealthy during this process. Thomas was the last Paycocke to live in Coggeshall, dying in 1580. It was the sold to the Buxton family who were clothiers and from 1746 changed hands several times eventually being bought by Lord Noel-Buxton, a descendant of the original Buxtons, and given to The National Trust in 1924. Restoration work was carried out in the 1960s and the house is now open to the public.

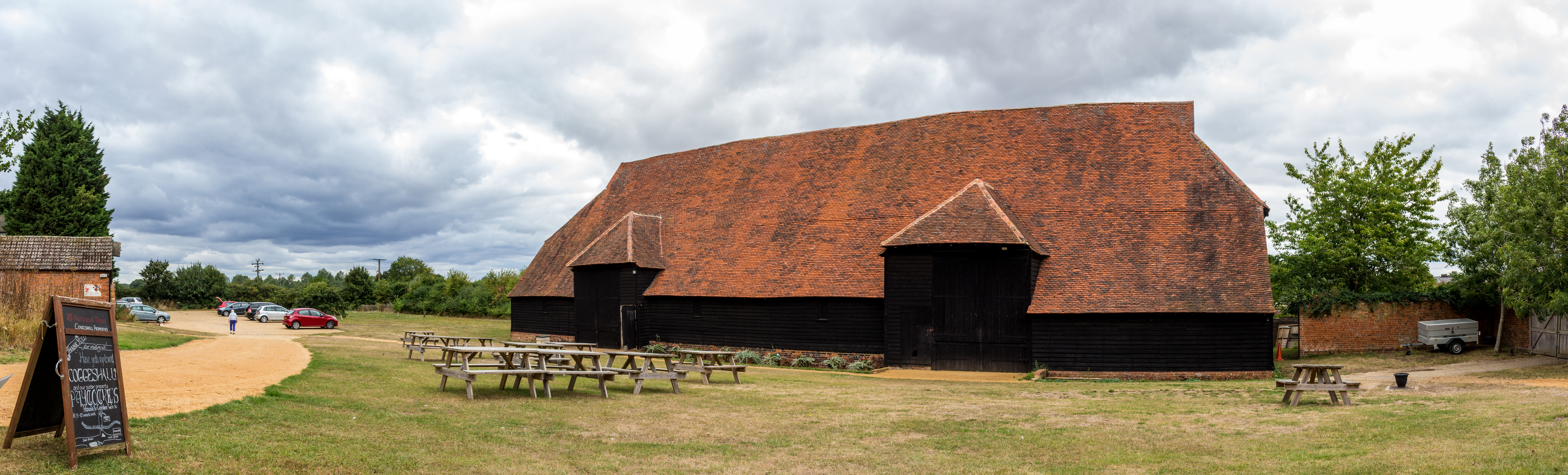
The Grange Barn, Coggeshall, one of the oldest surviving timber-framed buildings in Europe

Grange Barn was built by the Cistercians in the 13th century to serve the abbey. It is one of the oldest surviving timber-framed buildings in Europe. It was located a quarter of a mile from the Abbey and underwent significant structural alteration in the 14th century. It survived the Dissolution of the Monasteries, remaining in continual agricultural use up until 1960 when it was left derelict. It was compulsorily purchased in 1982 by Braintree District Council, who initiated the restoration of the barn, with the work being completed in 1985. In 1989 the barn was given to The National Trust for its future preservation. Although it has undergone extensive reconstruction and its original thatch roof has been replaced with tile, the barn today represents that which existed in the 14th century. Grange Barn is now open to the public showing a collection of farm carts and wagons, and is available to hire for special events.

The Coggeshall clock tower was built to celebrate Queen Victoria's jubilee in 1887 and the clockhouse was at one point a school for the poor children of the town and later housed an award-winning tearoom. It is currently a wine bar.

Nunn's Bridge, a wrought-iron footbridge on a Public Right of Way crossing the River Blackwater was listed by Historic England in 2020. Erected in 1892, it is unique in its design, and was made and installed by local blacksmith and social campaigner Henry 'Dick' Nunn after the previous wooden bridge was washed away and authorities refused to replace it. Nunn was an early campaigner for human and animal welfare, and advocate of rights of way in the countryside.

== Transport ==
=== Bus ===
- 1881–? – Moore's Bus – 3 times a day to Kelvedon station
- from 1982 – Coggeshall Community Bus (COG1) – Weekday (Monday-Friday) peak hours service from the town to Kelvedon station. It is currently served by a Mercedes-Benz mini-bus. A single fare cost £2, less than the parking cost at the station.
- 1963–2008 – the First Essex number 70 bus service between Chelmsford and Colchester (via Braintree) stopped in the town every hour.
- 2008–2016 – the First Essex number 70 bus service between Chelmsford and Colchester (via Braintree) stops in the town every 20 minutes Monday–Friday and every 30 minutes Saturday. Regal Buses provide the last number 70 bus service on Monday–Saturday evenings. The Sunday number 70 bus service is run by the TGM Group and stops in the town every 2 hours. There is also a limited service running from Wakes Colne to Sudbury and Bury St Edmunds via Coggeshall; this X16 service is run by H C Chambers once a day, Monday–Friday only.
- 2016-2022 – the First Essex number 70 bus service between Braintree and Colchester (via Braintree) stops in the town every 30 minutes Monday–Saturday and every two hours on Sunday.
- 2022-2023 – the First Essex number 70 was renumbered 370. The 370 bus service between Chelmsford and Colchester (via Braintree) stops in the town every 30 minutes Monday–Saturday and every two hours on Sunday.
- from 2023 - the First Essex number 370 replaced by new service X20 between Colchester and Stansted Airport via Braintree, running hourly and extended beyond Colchester city centre to the railway station. Overnight services skip Coggeshall but stop at Lee’s Farm at the eastern end of Colchester Road. Additional peak-hour weekday services between Braintree and Colchester are numbered 320.

=== Road ===
Coggeshall lies on the ancient Roman road of Stane Street. It is now serviced by the A120 road which follows the original road. Around 1982 a bypass was built around Coggeshall. Route A120 is part of European route E32.

=== Rail ===
The nearest train station is Kelvedon. Services are run by Greater Anglia with an off-peak service of two trains per hour to London Liverpool Street, one train per hour to Ipswich and one train per hour to Colchester Town, with additional peak services on weekdays.

A volunteer-run community bus COG1 runs between Coggeshall and Kelvedon on weekday mornings and evenings for commuters.

Marks Tey railway station is also nearby and accessible by hourly bus from Coggeshall.

== Culture ==
=== Coggeshall jobs ===
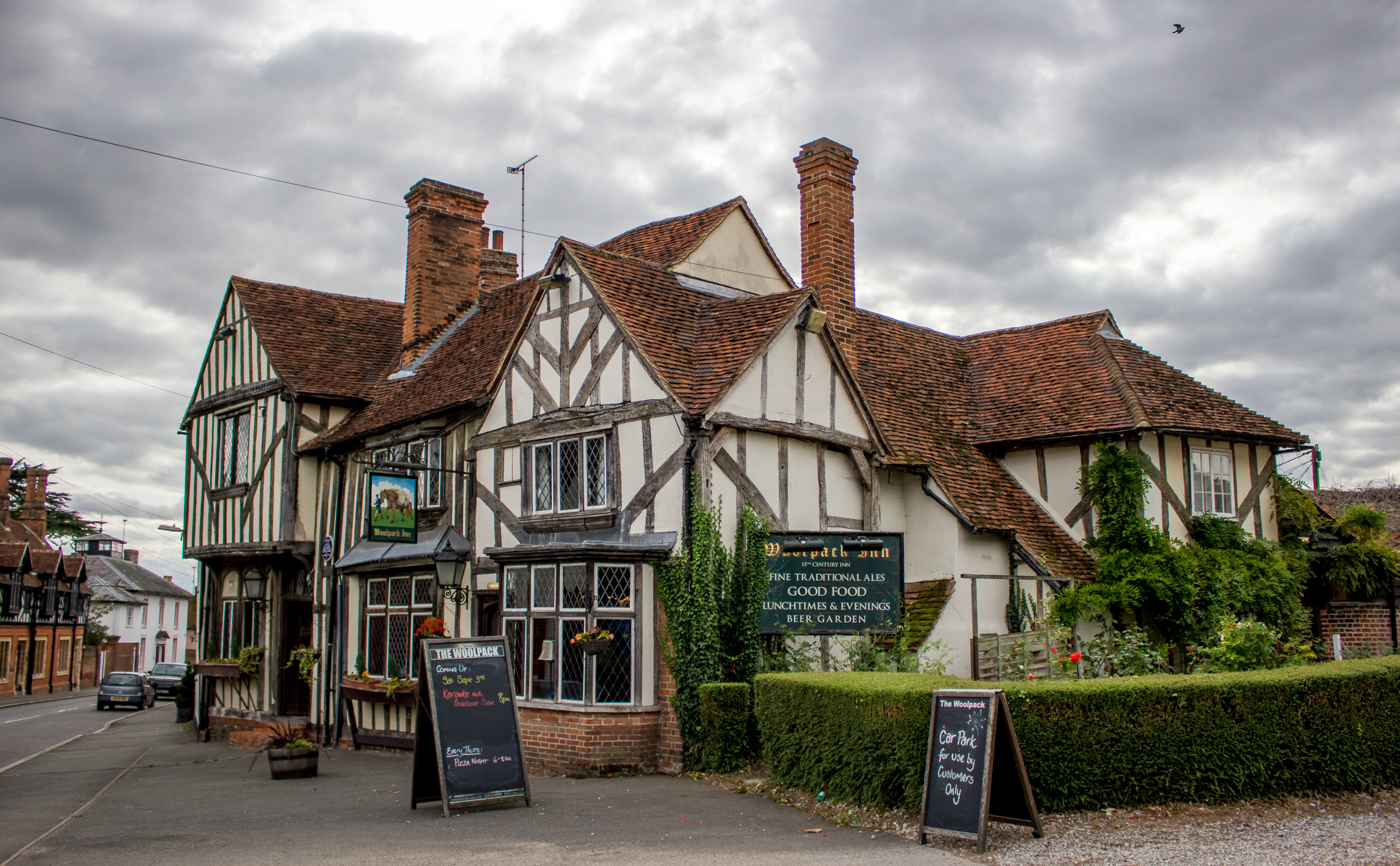
The Woolpack Inn

The saying "A Coggeshall job" was used in Essex from the 17th to the 19th century to mean any poor or pointless piece of work, after the reputed stupidity of its townsfolk. There were numerous stories of the inhabitants' ridiculous endeavours, such as chaining up a wheelbarrow in a shed after it had been bitten by a rabid dog, for fear it would go mad. John Ray's 1670 Collection of English Proverbs gives the following rhyme:

Braintree for the pure,
Bocking for the poor;
Coggeshall for the jeering town,
And Kelvedon for the whore.

The phrase is said to have originated one day when Coggeshall's town clock chimed 11 times at noon. When the townsfolk heard that the town clock at Lexden had struck 12 times at 11 o'clock, they rode to the town to collect the missing stroke. Other jobs included winching up a cow onto the church roof to eat the grass growing there, knocking down one of two windmills as there would not be enough wind for both of them, attempting to divert the course of the river with hurdles, hanging sheets over roads to prevent the wind from blowing disease into the town, chopping the head off a lamb to free it from a gate, removing stairs from a house to stop flood water entering and some appropriated from other 'fool centres', for example the classic 'fishing for the moon'.

=== Local tales ===
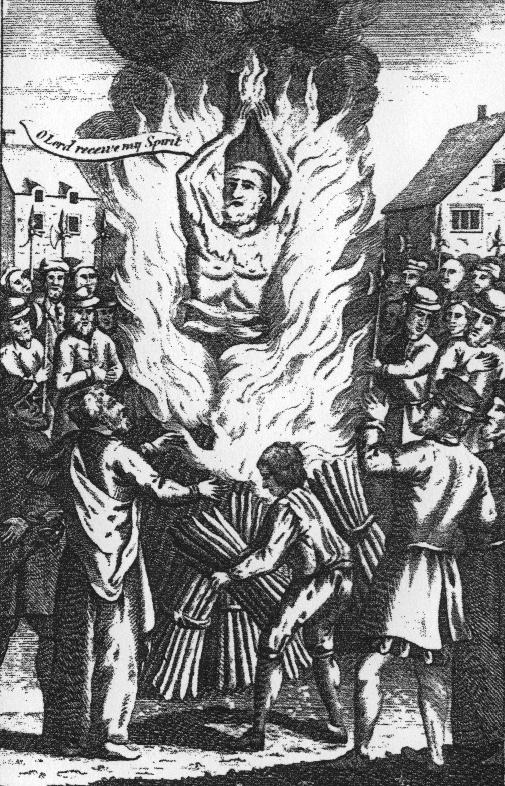
Thomas Hawkes on Market Hill, he is saying "O Lord receive my Spirit"

- Thomas Hawkes burned to death in 1555 during the Marian Persecutions rather than allow his son to be baptised into the Roman Catholic Church. Responding to Edmund Bonner, the Bishop of London, who urged him to return to Catholicism, he is reported to have said: "No my lord, that I will not, for if I had a hundred bodies I would suffer them all to be torn in pieces rather than I will abjure and recant." As he burned, Hawkes threw up his hands and clapped them three times, a sign to his friends that the pain could be endured. Hawkes' death and the circumstances leading up to it are recorded in detail in John Foxe's Book of Martyrs.
- Mary Honywood of nearby Mark's Hall, in an age of religious uncertainty, dashed a wineglass to the floor declaring "I shall be damned as surely as this is smashed". The wineglass rebounded, unbroken and she lived to the age of 93 years, having 19 children. She is commemorated in the church for having a total of 365 descendants at the time of her death.
- One of the latest recorded witch-hunts in England took place in Coggeshall. It is known from the diary of Joseph Bufton, a resident of the town, that in 1699 the widow Common was tried three times for witchcraft, each time by 'swimming' – binding her limbs and putting her in the river to see if she would sink. She was found guilty on each occasion but died, probably from influenza, before she could be hanged. Another account is found in the records of the Reverend James Boys, the Vicar of Coggeshall.
- During the Napoleonic Wars Coggeshall was required to raise a company of men for the defence of the country. This they did, although the Coggeshall Volunteers famously consisted of 20 officers and only 3 privates. One resident of the town, the schoolmaster Thomas Harris, was so amused by the situation he was inspired to write a short, satirical play entitled "The C*******ll Volunteer Corps". In the play he lampooned the surfeit of officers ("As the Corps at present consists mostly of officers no more will be admitted; but should any neighbouring Corps be in want of a few it may be accommodated at the rate of one officer for one private, and in every dozen so exchanged an officer will be thrown in extra. God save the King."), the quality of the troops and the courage of their commanders (in the event that the nearby town of Colchester was invaded the corps would move to defend Braintree, and if Braintree were to be attacked they would defend Colchester, etc.) The play was so popular it reached four editions. Unfortunately, despite Harris' insistence that it was not so, many of the town's citizens believed that they were being personally caricatured and, taking offence, withdrew their children from his school.
- Mr Nunn, a former blacksmith, is well known for his local deeds. Knowing the Grange Hill to be too steep for horses with heavy loads, he proceeded with others to lower the top and was removed by the police. His most famous deed is the construction of an iron bridge that spans the Blackwater.
- Robin's Brook is said to be haunted by the ghost of a woodcutter named Robin.

=== Media ===
Local news and television programmes are provided by BBC East and ITV Anglia. Television signals are received from the Sudbury television transmitter.

Local radio stations are BBC Essex on 103.5 FM, Heart East on 96.1 FM, Greatest Hits Radio East (formerly Dream 100 FM) on 100.2 FM, Actual Radio a DAB station and Leisure FM, a community based radio station that broadcast on 107.4 FM.

The town is served by these local newspapers, Braintree and Witham Times, Essex County Standard and East Anglian Daily Times.

=== Sport ===
The local football club, Coggeshall Town, currently play in the Essex & Suffolk Border League and were previously members of the Essex Senior League. They are one of the oldest clubs in existence having been founded in 1878.

The local cricket team, Coggeshall Town CC, currently plays in the Two Counties Cricket Championship, the second tier of club cricket in Essex and have won the 1st Division on 4 occasions, the last in the 90s. They are one of the oldest cricket clubs in Essex having been formed in the 1800s.

JMW Motorsport, a European Le Mans Series LMGT3 class team, are based in Coggleshall.

== Notable people ==
- John Jegon – born in Coggeshall in 1550, Bishop of Norwich 1602.
- John Rogers – born in Coggeshall 11 January 1630. Emigrated in 1636 and became President of Harvard University.
- John Owen – Vicar of Coggeshall (1646–1651), theologian, chaplain to Oliver Cromwell, Dean of Christ Church, Oxford.
- Richard Mant – Vicar of Coggeshall (1810–1820), later Bishop of Down and Connor, wrote a history of the Church of Ireland.
- Henry Doubleday (1810–1902), scientist and horticulturist.
- John Carter (1815–1850), silk weaver who became a celebrated mouth artist after an accident paralysed him from the neck down.
- William Unwin (1838–1933) - engineer
- Muriel Rose, art collector, curator and writer, lived in Coggeshall in the 1970s.
- David Hicks (1929–1998) - interior decorator and designer, noted for using bold colours, mixing antique and modern furnishings.
- Tony Newton (1937–2012) – Baron Newton of Braintree, Conservative politician and peer.
- Luke Wright – poet (b. 1982) grew up in Coggeshall.

=== Ralph of Coggeshall ===
The sixth abbot of Coggeshall's abbey (from 1207 to 1218), Lord Ralph was one of the most important chroniclers of his time, described by the historian E. L. Cutts as "a man of polished erudition, as well as of temperance and arrived at such a degree of excellence in literature as to be esteemed by far the first of the brethren of his convent." He is known particularly for his work in the Chronicon Anglicanum ('Chronicle of English Affairs'). It is from that work that much of the early history of Coggeshall is known. Due to ill health he ceded his title to the seventh abbot, Lord Benedict de Straford in 1218, living quietly in the Abbey until his death in 1228.

=== Coggeshall Gang ===
In the 1840s a gang of criminals terrorised Coggeshall and the neighbouring villages. Their headquarters were at the Black Horse Inn on Stoneham Street and their success was due to the unpaid and untrained, spare-time parish constables' inability to deal effectively with crime in their local area. The gang committed burglaries and violent robberies across Coggeshall, Great Tey, Cressing and Bradwell. Their crimes were often brutal and mainly directed at the elderly. Dell's Hole in nearby Earls Colne is named after Mr Dell who was attacked by the gang as he made his way home after a day at Coggeshall market. During a raid on a farmhouse one of the gang was recognised, and was soon arrested: the captain of the gang promised to care for his family if he refused to identify his partners-in-crime. He was sentenced to transportation for fifteen years. After the trial his mother told him his family were not being helped by the gang so he turned Queen's evidence.

The magistrates convened at the Chapel Inn in Coggeshall and sent a posse of the new county police to the Black Horse Inn. Some of the gang were caught there and then, but the gang's leader made a daring escape across the rooftops, eventually being arrested trying to board a ship to France. Twenty men were brought to trial at the Shire Hall in Chelmsford, evidence being provided by 700 witnesses. Such was the interest in the gang that the galleries of the courtroom were filled with fashionably dressed women. One of the members was sentenced to hang, commuted to transportation for life, and others were transported to Australia for terms varying from life to seven years. ally farmed a large area of Western Australia and retired to Coggeshall a very wealthy man. Another had farms in Queensland and became a pillar of his local community, while a third ran a successful bakery in Tasmania and mingled with the best of local society. .

== Cultural references ==
The Town was featured in the BBC TV series Lovejoy.

== Education ==
The Cistercians maintained a library at the Abbey. Scholarly works were produced such as Ralph of Coggeshall's Chronicon Anglicanum and John Godard's Concerning the threefold method of calculating alongside the ecclesiastical. There was also a school at the Abbey before 1464, in contravention of Cistercian rule.

Sir Robert Hitcham's School was founded in 1636 as part of the will of Sir Robert Hitcham, a member of parliament and Attorney General. The school was to educate 20 or 30 of the poorest children of the town and to give them funding for apprenticeships. The school functioned until the mid-20th century, being rebuilt in 1858 on land opposite Paycockes.

A national school was started in 1838–39 when the old workhouse on Stoneham Street was given to the vicar and churchwardens.

The British school was built on land adjoining the Independent Chapel (current-day Christ Church) in 1841 for education of the poor.

In the late 20th century St Peter's School Church of England Primary School was opened in the land opposite St. Peter ad Vincula Church. It was rebuilt in the 1980s.

In 2008 a Montessori School was founded in the rooms above Christ Church.

Coggeshall has one comprehensive secondary school called Honywood Community Science School.

== General and cited references ==
- Beaumont, George Frederick (1890). A History of Coggeshall, in Essex. ISBN 0-9539165-0-2.
- Coggeshall Official Guide. Coggesall: Coggeshall Parish Council. 1977. p. 26.
- Rose, Beatrice M. (2003) [c.a. 1950s]. A Brief History of Coggeshall Abbey. Coggeshall: Coggeshall Museum.
- Workers Education Authority (2000) [1951]. The History of Coggeshall 1700–1914. Coggeshall: Coggeshall Museum.
- Brewer, Ebenezer Cobham (1898). Dictionary of Phrase and Fable (Revised and Updated ed.). Philadelphia: Henry Altemus Company. ISBN 1-58734-094-1.
- Greatorex, Jane (1999). Coggeshall Abbey and Abbey Mill (Manors, Mills & Manuscripts). Jane Greatorex, Castle Hedingham, Essex. ISBN 0-9518543-4-8.
- a guide to essex churches. Chelmsford: Essex Tourism. 2006. p. 4.
- "Cistercian Abbeys: Coggeshall". Cistercians in Yorkshire.
- "Coggeshall Museum and Heritage Centre". Archived from the original on 5 December 2004.
  - "Coggeshall 2003". Archived from the original on 4 April 2005.
- "A brief History of St Peters". St. Peter-ad-Vincula official website. Archived from the original on 8 September 2006.
- "Medieval bricks meant business for Essex Man". British Archaeology.
- "Unlocking Essex's Past". Essex County Council. Archived from the original on 25 September 2006.
