= Hinckford (hundred) =

Historical Hundred of Essex, England

The Hinckford Hundred was one of the 19 historic Hundreds of Essex, covering an area of approximately 110566 acres. It lay in the north of Essex, occupying most of what is now Braintree district. By 1327 it was the third richest hundred in Essex.

Alternative forms of the name:

Hinckford, Hidincfort, Hidincforda, Hiding(a)forda, Hiding(a)fort, Hiding(h)afort, Hidingh(e)forda, Hidingeforda, Hedingfort 1086 DBHengham 1161-2 P, 1198 Cur, 1264 Misc, 1285 IpmHaingeford, He(y)ing(e)ford 1167-90 P, 1185 RotDom, 1219 Fees, 1235 AssHaingesford 1167 ChancRHeng(e)ford 1190 P, 1235-55 Ass , 1238 SR, 1280 Ipm, 1346 FAHainford 1259 IpmHynkford p. 1420 FA hundred de Hynham 1470 MinAcct

The 47 parishes of Hinckford were as follows:

Alphamstone, Ashen, Belchamp Otten, Belchamp St Paul, Belchamp Walter, Birdbrook, Bocking, Borley, Braintree, Bulmer, Steeple Bumpstead, Bures, Felsted, Finchingfield, Foxearth, Gestingthorpe, Gosfield, Halstead, Great Henny, Little Henny, Haverhill, Castle Hedingham, Sible Hedingham, Lamarsh, Liston, Great Maplestead, Little Maplestead, Middleton, Ovington, Panfield, Pebmarsh, Pentlow, Rayne, Ridgewell, Great Saling, Shalford, Stambourne, Stebbing, Stisted, Sturmer, Tilbury Juxta Clare, Toppesfield, Twinstead, Wethersfield, Wickham St Paul, Great Yeldham, Little Yeldham

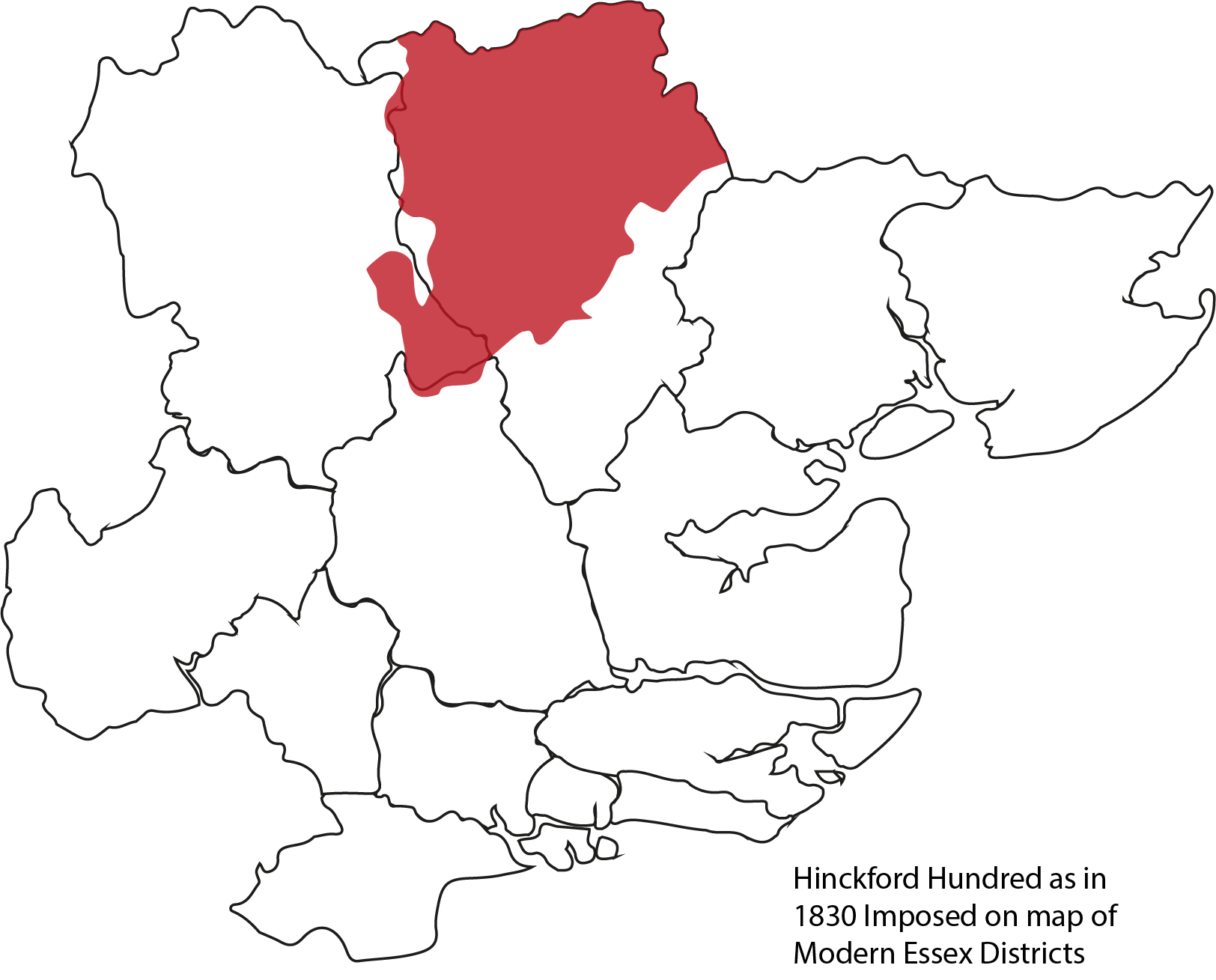
Hinckford Hundred, Imposed in Red over a map of modern districts of Essex
