= Belchamp Rural District =

Former local government district in Essex, United Kingdom

Coordinates: 52.0°N 0.7°E

Belchamp was a rural district in Essex in England. It was formed under the Local Government Act 1894 from that part of the Sudbury rural sanitary district which was in Essex (the rest going to form the Melford Rural District in West Suffolk).

The rural district contained the following parishes:

- Alphamstone
- Belchamp Otten
- Belchamp St Paul
- Belchamp Walter
- Borley
- Bulmer
- Bures
- Foxearth
- Gestingthorpe
- Great Henny
- Lamarsh
- Liston
- Little Henny
- Middleton
- North Wood
- Pentlow
- Twinstead
- Wickham St Paul

Originally, the rural district also contained part of the parish of Ballingdon, the rest of which was in West Suffolk. The Essex part of the parish was transferred to West Suffolk (and the borough of Sudbury) in 1896.

Belchamp rural district was abolished in 1934 under a County Review Order, and merged into the Halstead Rural District.
