= Belchamp =

Belchamp may refer to the following places in England:

- Belchamp Otten
- Belchamp St Paul
- Belchamp Walter
- Belchamp Rural District (former)
