= Borley =

Village in Essex, England

Coordinates: 52.0561°N 0.6971°E

- Village and civil parish
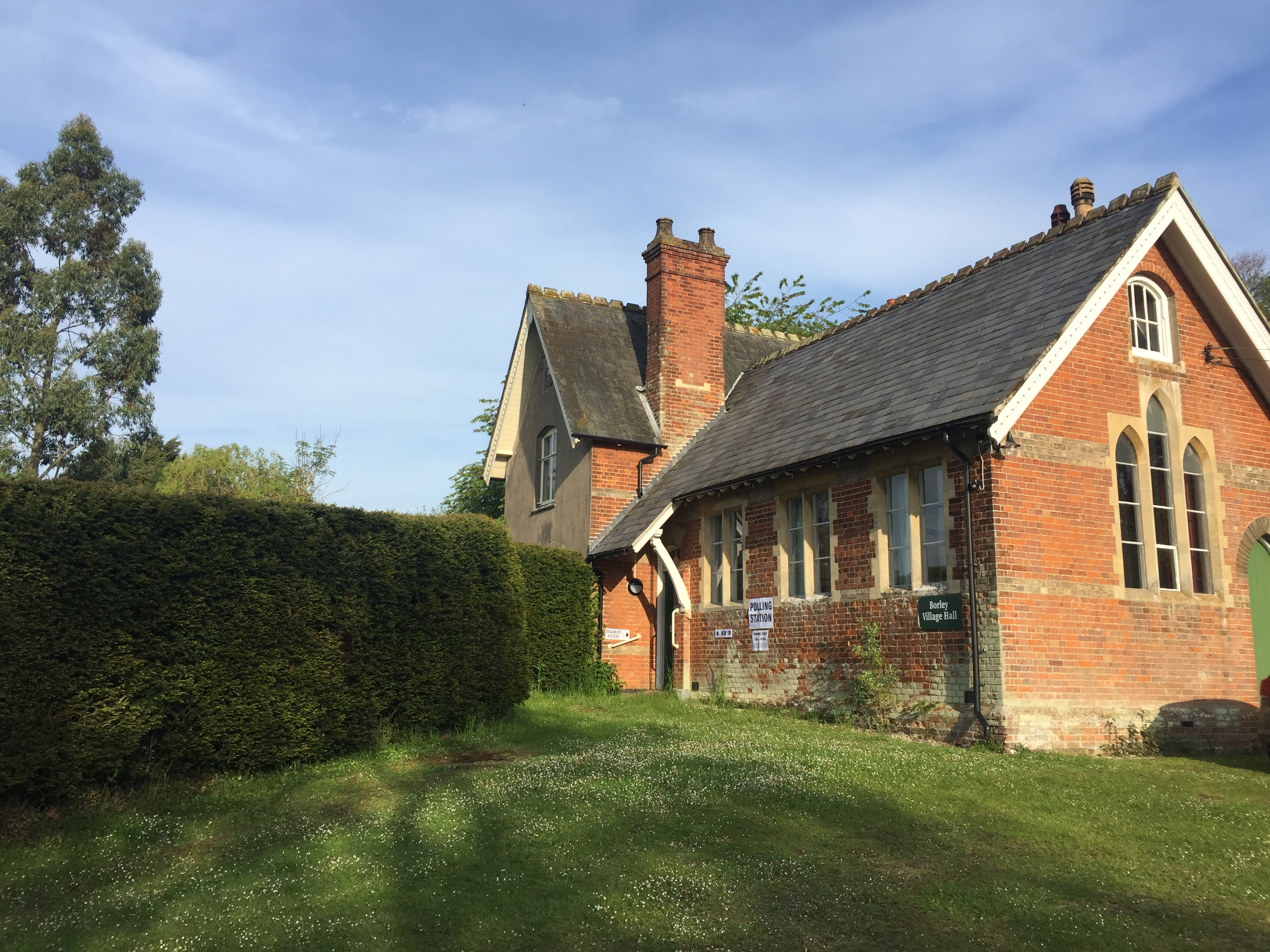
- Borley Village Hall

- Location within Essex
- Population: 111 (Parish, 2021)
- OS grid reference: TL850431
- District: Braintree
- Shire county: Essex
- Region: East
- Country: England
- Sovereign state: United Kingdom
- Post town: SUDBURY
- Postcode district: CO10
- Dialling code: 01787
- Police: Essex
- Fire: Essex
- Ambulance: East of England
- UK Parliament: Braintree

Borley is a village and civil parish in rural north Essex, England. It lies close to the border with Suffolk and near the River Stour. The closest town is Sudbury, Suffolk, approximately 3 km (1.9 mi) southeast of Borley; Sudbury is also the Post Town used by Royal Mail for Borley. The neighbouring parishes are Foxearth, Belchamp Walter and Bulmer. At the 2021 census the parish had a population of 111.

== History ==
The name Borley may be a compound of the Saxon words "Bap" and "Ley", that is "Boar's Pasture". Recent local research suggests that the name Borley may be derived from the Celtic ‘borle’, meaning ‘summer meadows’ which are still a prominent feature of the area. A smaller parish, Borley Parva, was joined with Foxearth in the Middle Ages.

In the 11th century, the manor of Borley was held by a freeman called Lewin; by 1086, the Domesday Book records Borley manor in the hands of Adeliza of Normandy, Countess of Albemarle (half-sister of William the Conqueror); it was subsequently transferred to Edward I.

A document from 1308 sets out the 'Extent' of the manor, listing the main occupants and the rental income. Forty-six people are named in the extent: seven as free tenants, seven as molmen, 27 as villeins and five as cotemen – with an estimated population of 230. In 1346, the manor of Borley was transferred to the priory of Christ Church, Canterbury.

From the 16th century, Borley was associated with the Waldegraves, one of the leading Essex Catholic families. Sir Edward Waldegrave, a courtier to Queen Mary, purchased the manor of Borley in 1546 and it became his principal residence. He died in the Tower of London in 1561 aged forty-four having fallen out of favour with Queen Elizabeth; his widow, Lady Frances Neville, later erected a monument to him and herself in Borley Church.

From early times until local government reforms in 1894, Borley was one of the parishes in the Hinckford Hundred. It then became an area in Belchamp Rural District Council until that, in turn, was abolished in 1974 with the creation of Braintree District Council.

== Local government ==
Due to its small population, decision-making at parish level is through a Parish Meeting open to all electors rather than an elected council. Borley is in part of England having two tiers of "principal" local authorities. It is one of 12 parishes making up Stour Valley North Ward, which is represented by a district councillor on Braintree District Council. It is also within the area of Essex County Council, represented by one county councillor as part of the Hedingham County Electoral Division.

For elections to the UK Parliament, Borley is in the constituency of Braintree.

== Natural and built environment ==
Borley consists of three clusters of buildings: one closest to the River Stour, including the village hall; one around the parish church; and a third at Borley Green. In 2012, there were 89 voting residents in a total of around 110, occupying 49 dwellings. Borley is notable for the high proportion of Listed Buildings. There are 15 Grade II listed houses, including Borley Hall (the fragment of a once much larger house), Borley Place (at one time the rectory) and Borley Lodge.

A purpose built school was opened in 1880. It closed in 1939. The building has been used as a village hall since 1956.

Borley Church, dedication unknown, is a Grade I Listed building of stone, originally in the Romanesque/Early English style of the late 12th and early 13th centuries. Pevsner notes that a "topiary walk to the porch is the most notable feature of the church".

There is no "defined village envelope" and therefore for planning purposes, Borley and Borely Green (an area of grassland owned by Braintree District Council) are considered to be "countryside". Borley is located within Natural England's South Suffolk and North Essex Clayland National Character Area, with "an ancient landscape of wooded arable countryside with a distinct sense of enclosure".

== Notable Borley residents ==
- Edward Waldegrave (c. 1516 – 1561), courtier and administrator.
- James Spalding Gardiner (1820 – 1910), farmer, campaigner, politician.
- Miriam Hood (1922 – 1991), Venezuelan diplomat and historian.
- Ben Bousquet (1939 – 2006), Anti-apartheid campaigner and Labour party activist.

== Borley in popular culture ==
During the 20th century, Borley became well known for the 'Borley Rectory Affair', involving the supposed haunting of a Victorian rectory (demolished in 1944). Beginning in 1929, psychical researcher Harry Price generated a story that captured the attention of the nation and convinced many of the proof of the permanence of the spirit after death. His supposed activities were reported widely by the press of that time, and Price published several popular books on the subject that brought him considerable fame. After Price's death, the story began to unravel under the scrutiny of experts from the Society for Psychical Research. The Society went through the records with great tenacity, suspecting that Price had exaggerated evidence to sensationalise events and to suggest supernatural causes for mundane phenomena. Any possible evidence of ghosts was irredeemably contaminated by Price's behaviour and the manipulation of the facts in his two books, The Most Haunted House in England and The End of Borley Rectory, produced during and immediately after the Second World War.
