= Henny (disambiguation) =

Henny is a given name, nickname and surname. It may also refer to:

- Hennessy, a brand of cognac sometimes referred to as "Henny"
- Henny (slang), alternate pronunciation of honey popularised on Drag Race
- "Henny", a track on the album New York: A Love Story, 2013 debut album of American R&B singer Mack Wilds

== See also ==
- Great Henny and Little Henny, villages in Essex, England
