= Dunedin Museum of Natural Mystery =

Museum in Dunedin New Zealand

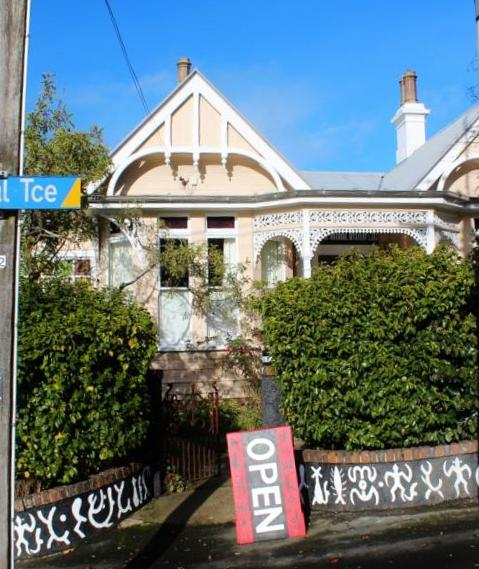
- Established: 2018; 8 years ago
- Location: 61 Royal Terrace; Dunedin; New Zealand
- Coordinates: 45.865°S 170.504°E
- Type: Natural history museum
- Collections: Natural history, ethnography, art, paranormal
- Curator: Bruce Mahalski
- Parking: On street
- Website: royaldunedinmuseum.com

The Dunedin Museum of Natural Mystery is a private museum of bones, bone art, ethnographic artifacts, and assorted curios in Dunedin, New Zealand. Created by mural artist and sculptor Bruce Mahalski, in his Royal Terrace residence, it opened to the public in March 2018.

== History ==
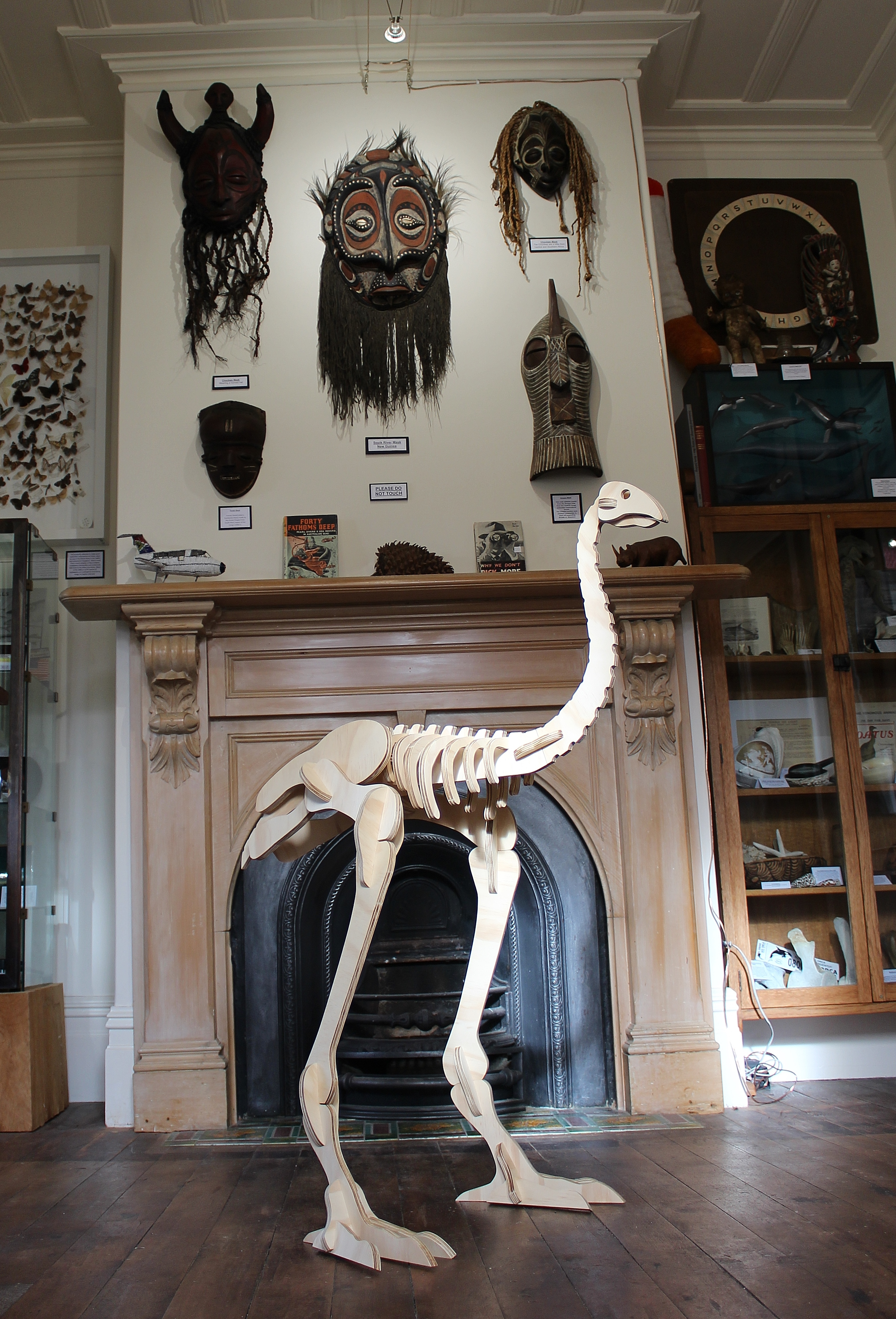
Model moa skeleton

Mahalski had worked as an artist and illustrator for many years, and taught art in Wellington, New Zealand, from 2004 to 2017. Part of his art practice involved creating works from animal bones, reflecting his lifetime fascination with natural history. As a teenager, Mahalski worked as an unofficial intern at the Otago Museum, and opening his own museum had been a lifelong dream: "I wanted to work in museums when I was young, But I guess I’m not much of a team player, so it seemed easiest…just to try and set up my own."

Mahalski had been collecting shells, bones, crabs, and insects since the age of eight. His collection of natural history curiosities and cultural objects, incorporating collections of both his parents (his father was a physician and his mother a psychologist), incorporated specimens found in nature, and objects acquired on his travels and from Trade Me.

In 2017, Mahalski moved back to his home town of Dunedin, and turned four rooms and the hall of his central city residence at 61 Royal Terrace into exhibition galleries, while continuing to live in the remainder of the house. The Museum of Natural Mystery opened to the public on 23 March 2018, initially only on Fridays, Saturdays, and Sundays. From the outside the museum resembles an ordinary Dunedin villa, but is decorated with the rongorongo script of Easter Island.

== Exhibits ==
Described as "David Lynch meets David Attenborough", the museum exhibits "biological curiosities, ethnological art and unusual cultural artefacts". Some of the exhibits are memorials to people, including Mahalski's father, physician E. R. Nye. They include the bones of many different species of animal (including humans), 200 skulls, pinned butterfly collections, vintage books (especially medical texts), and ephemera. On display is a hippo skull, and a giraffe skull sourced from a game park after the animal was culled (no animals were killed for the purposes of exhibition).

Other exhibits include:

- a card deck with the faces of wanted Iraq War criminals
- the skull of a "unicow", a malformed cow with single horn growing out of its forehead
- a plate belonging to the last man to be hanged in England for sheep stealing
- wood from the English haunted house Borley Rectory
- a clay sculpture allegedly damaged by a poltergeist at the Inverlochy Art School in Wellington
- nkisi sculptures from the Congo

The museum also contains a gallery where Mahalski exhibits his bone sculptures. For him, "the roles of artist and collector are inseparable; items from his collection make their way into his art and his art is displayed next to his collection. More than this, he sees the whole collection as a work of art in itself."

== Gallery ==
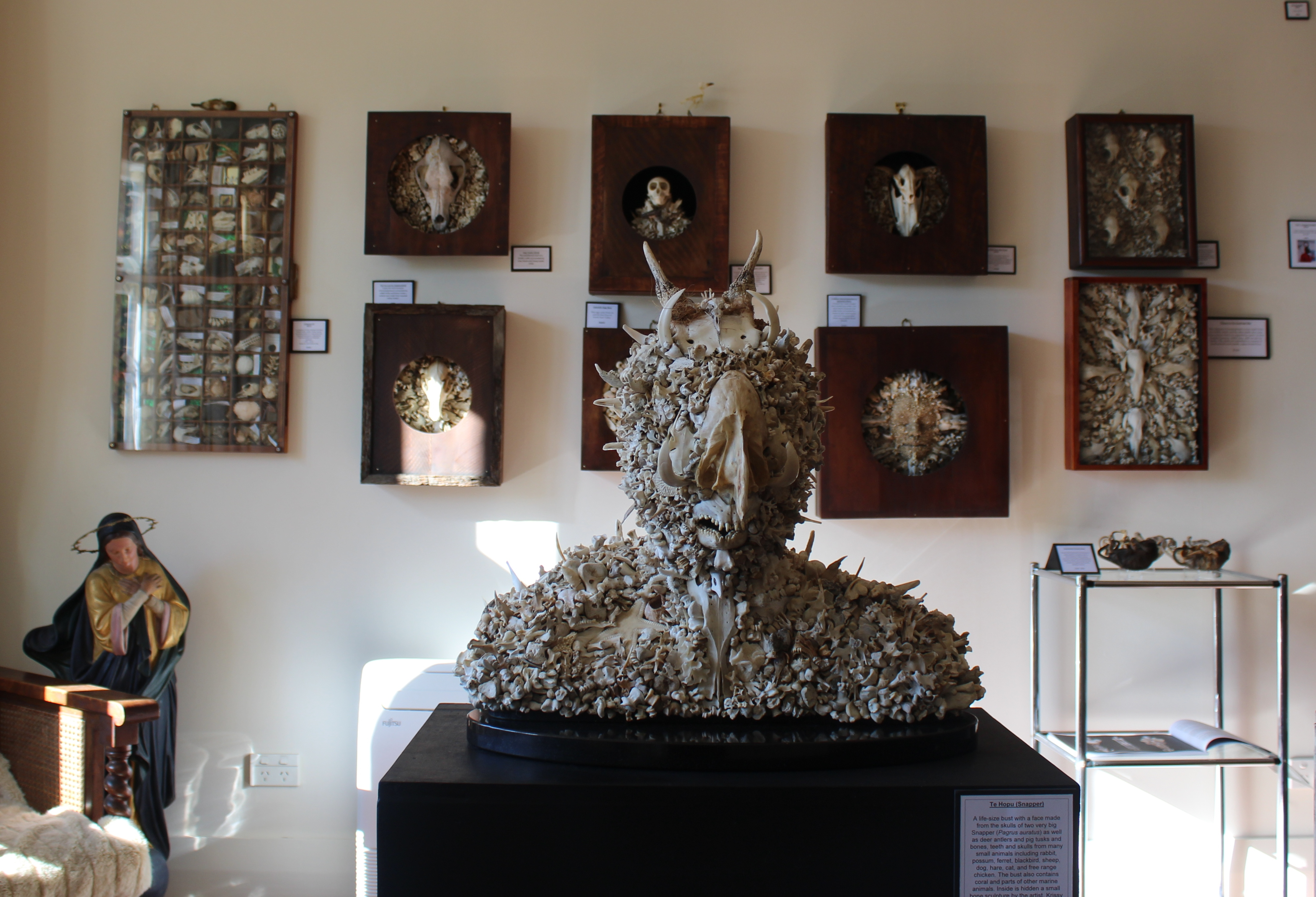
Bone sculpture

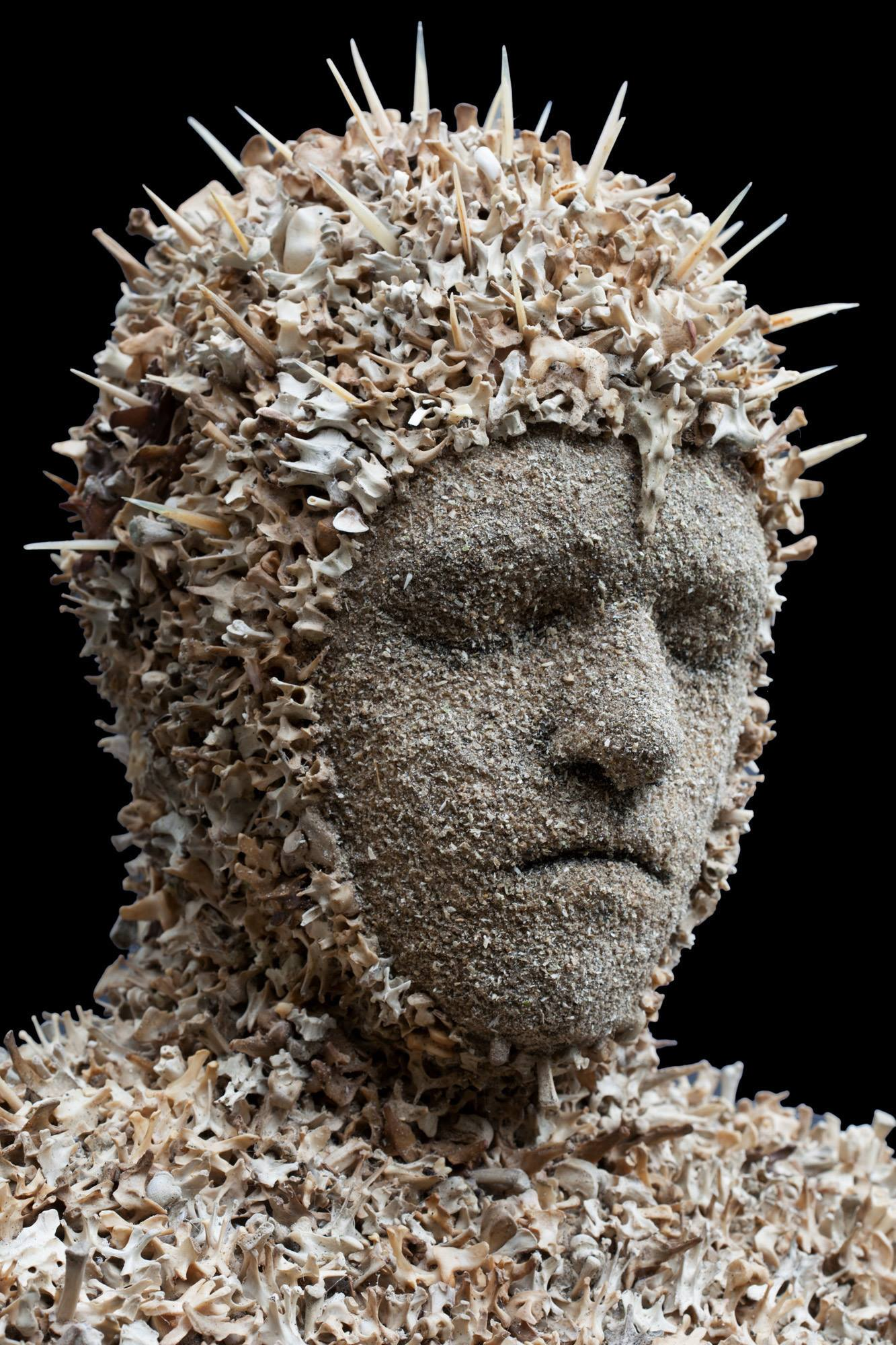
"Kiribati Warrior" bone sculpture

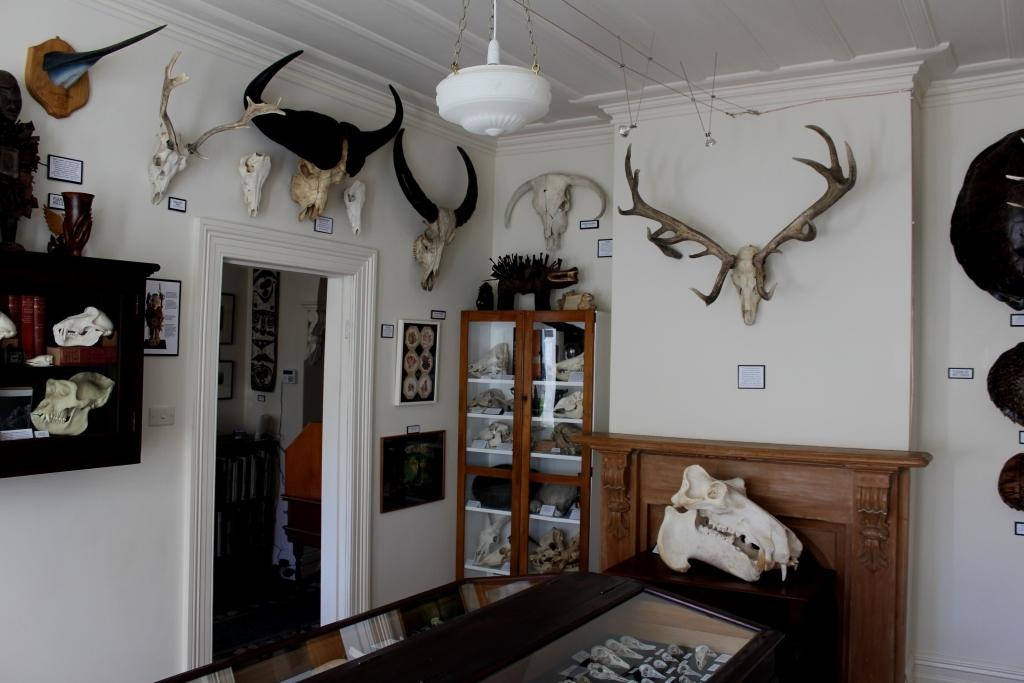
The Mammal Room

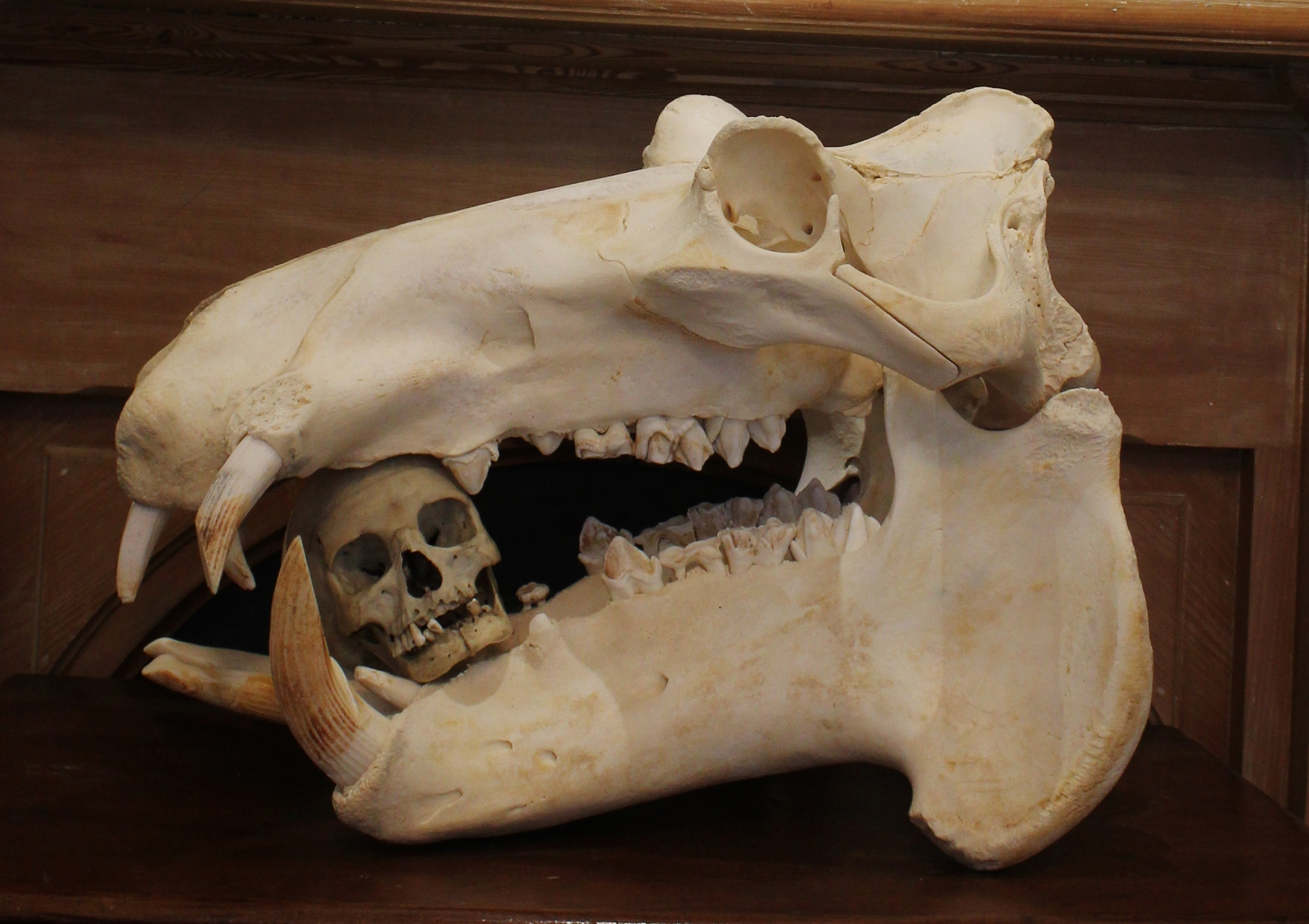
Hippo and human skull
