= Belchamp Hall =

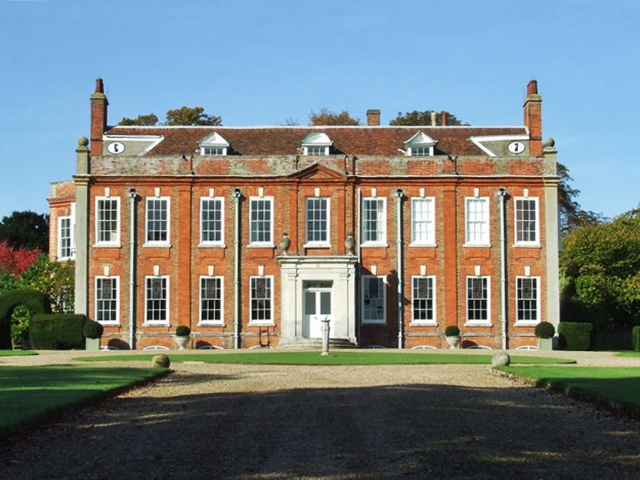

- Location within Essex

General information
- Type: Country house
- Architectural style: Queen Anne
- Location: Belchamp Walter, Essex, England
- Coordinates: 52.03451°N 0.6612°E
- Completed: c.1720

Belchamp Hall /biːtʃəm/ is a Queen Anne-style country house in the parish of Belchamp Walter, Essex, England, west of Sudbury, Suffolk. It is a Grade II* listed house.

Built of naturally bright red bricks with white casements and keystones, grey quoins and a grey topside of its red cornice, the hall has four roof-integrated gulleys feeding grey symmetrical downpipes, two high-ceiling storeys, hidden basement, a double-pile plan form and a side-gabled peg-tile roof with a long suite of dormer-window-sporting attic rooms. The front façade has nine, narrow bays. The first-floor central bay projects very slightly, and is pediment-decorated above a white portico topped with two urn finials. The house was built c. 1720 in place of an Elizabethan house and has views across the valley of the Belchamp Brook to the fields and few houses of Bulmer.

Much interior panelling is Elizabethan or Jacobean, probably from the demolished forerunner. Family portraits by well-known artists were recorded as on the walls at the time of its national assessment as to listing.

Its parkland, diminished since 1741, is itself Grade II listed; the listing does not state if the house retains most of the parish farmland in chief (as landlord).

== History ==
The estate and original house was bought from Sir John Wentworth by John Raymond in 1611. Members of the Raymond family have lived on the spot since then, such as Oliver Raymond, one of two knights of the shire (MPs) for Essex in the First and Second Protectorate Parliaments, a son of and the main heir of John. Samuel J. St. Clere Raymond died at the present hall in 1900, leaving total assets of £20,000 (equivalent to £2,000,000 in 2025). He was succeeded by his son Samuel Philip and in turn by Michael Murray John Raymond, MC, then by Charles Francis Valentine Raymond.

== In film and other hire uses ==
The hall was used as the setting in the 1980s and 1990s as "Felsham Hall" in the TV series Lovejoy and in the 2022 film Downton Abbey: A New Era as the home of Maud, Baroness Bagshaw.

The grounds and main parts of the house are sometimes used for weddings.
