= Listed buildings in Belchamp Walter =

Listed buildings in Essex, England

Belchamp Walter is a village and civil parish in the Braintree District of Essex, England. It contains 35 listed buildings that are recorded in the National Heritage List for England. Of these one is grade I, one is grade II* and 33 are grade II.

This list is based on the information retrieved online from Historic England.

== Key ==
Grade	Criteria
I	Buildings that are of exceptional interest
II*	Particularly important buildings of more than special interest
II	Buildings that are of special interest

== Listing ==
Name	Grade	Location	Type	Completed (Note: The date given is the date used by Historic England as significant for the initial building or that of an important part in the structure's description.)	Date designated	Grid ref. (Note: The grid reference is based on the British national grid reference system, sometimes known as OSGB36, used by the Ordnance Survey.) Geo-coordinates	Notes	Entry number (Note: The "List Entry Number" is a unique number assigned to each listed building and scheduled monument by Historic England.)	Image	Wikidata
Barn Approximately 200 Metres South of Eyston Smyths Farmhouse	II				17 May 1984	TL8264542805; 52°03′13″N 0°39′45″E		1308970	Upload Photo	Q26595516
Sham Castle/folly 430 Metres South West of Belchamp Hall	II				22 August 1986	TL8237040368; 52°01′54″N 0°39′26″E		1306466	Upload Photo	Q26593244
Eyston Hall	II				22 August 1986	TL8369642372; 52°02′57″N 0°40′39″E		1123314	Upload Photo	Q26416412
Hopkins Farmhouse	II				7 August 1952	TL7995639454; 52°01′28″N 0°37′17″E		1169516	Upload Photo	Q26462709
Mill Cottage	II				22 August 1986	TL8245241020; 52°02′15″N 0°39′31″E		1337865	Upload Photo	Q26685056
St Mary's Hall	II				7 August 1952	TL8008539775; 52°01′38″N 0°37′25″E		1123315	Upload Photo	Q26416413
The Rookery	II				22 August 1986	TL8426941972; 52°02′44″N 0°41′08″E		1306498	Upload Photo	Q26593272
Railings Fronting the Old Bakehouse	II	Corner Of North Road And Hall Road			22 August 1986	TL8191940554; 52°02′01″N 0°39′02″E		1123282	Upload Photo	Q26416378
The Old Bakehouse	II	Corner Of North Road And Hall Road			22 August 1986	TL8193340561; 52°02′01″N 0°39′03″E		1123281	Upload Photo	Q26416377
Largess Farmhouse	II	Gestingthorpe Road			22 August 1986	TL8174339871; 52°01′39″N 0°38′52″E		1337866	Upload Photo	Q26622233
Tomb Chest, 2 Metres from South East Nave Buttress on Parish Church	II	2 Metres From South East Nave Buttress On Parish Church, Hall Road			22 August 1986	TL8274940689; 52°02′04″N 0°39′46″E		1169557	Upload Photo	Q26462749
Garden House/folly 60 Metres South of Belchamp Hall	II	Hall Road			22 August 1986	TL8269540584; 52°02′01″N 0°39′43″E		1123277	Upload Photo	Q26416372
Gate Piers and Walls Forming Part of the East and North Boundary of Belchamp Hall and Linked to Former Stable Block	II	Hall Road			22 August 1986	TL8260440836; 52°02′09″N 0°39′39″E		1123319	Upload Photo	Q26416418
Gate Piers to the Main Entrance of Belchamp Hall	II	Hall Road			22 August 1986	TL8271740666; 52°02′03″N 0°39′44″E		1306484	Upload Photo	Q26593260
Hall Cottage	II	Hall Road			22 August 1986	TL8282940610; 52°02′02″N 0°39′50″E		1169549	Upload Photo	Q26462742
Mill Cottage	II	Hall Road			22 August 1986	TL8275440498; 52°01′58″N 0°39′46″E		1306470	Upload Photo	Q26593247
Munt House	II	Hall Road			7 August 1952	TL8271540794; 52°02′08″N 0°39′45″E		1123317	Upload Photo	Q26416416
Parish Church of St Mary the Virgin	I	Hall Road	church building		21 June 1962	TL8274440700; 52°02′05″N 0°39′46″E		1337867	Parish Church of St Mary the Virgin More images	Q17536231
Springgates	II	Hall Road			7 August 1952	TL8209840489; 52°01′58″N 0°39′12″E		1169569	Upload Photo	Q26462758
Stable and Coach House 50 Metres North of Belchamp Hall	II	Hall Road			22 August 1986	TL8265340769; 52°02′07″N 0°39′41″E		1337869	Upload Photo	Q26622235
Stone Pier Defining North West Roadside Corner of the Curtilage of Munt House	II	Hall Road			22 August 1986	TL8268640799; 52°02′08″N 0°39′43″E		1123318	Upload Photo	Q26416417
Stone Pier Defining South East Roadside Corner of the Curtilage of Munt House	II	Hall Road			22 August 1986	TL8271740757; 52°02′06″N 0°39′45″E		1306479	Upload Photo	Q26593255
The Munt Cottage	II	Hall Road			22 August 1986	TL8279440580; 52°02′01″N 0°39′48″E		1123316	Upload Photo	Q26416414
The Round House	II	Hall Road			22 August 1986	TL8226240612; 52°02′02″N 0°39′20″E		1337868	Upload Photo	Q26622234
Vase in Front of Belchamp Hall	II	Hall Road			22 August 1986	TL8268740699; 52°02′05″N 0°39′43″E		1123320	Upload Photo	Q26416419
Vase in Front of Belchamp Hall	II	Hall Road			22 August 1986	TL8268240655; 52°02′03″N 0°39′43″E		1275931	Upload Photo	Q26683218
Belchamp Hall, Including Outbuilding at Rear	II*	Including Outbuilding At Rear, Hall Road	English country house		12 November 1955	TL8264240688; 52°02′04″N 0°39′40″E		1169581	Belchamp Hall, Including Outbuilding at Rear More images	Q17557597
Barn 30 Metres West of Fishers Farmhouse	II	North Road			8 June 1978	TL8177641239; 52°02′23″N 0°38′56″E		1337890	Upload Photo	Q26622252
Cart Lodge 30 Metres South East of Fishers Farmhouse	II	North Road			22 August 1986	TL8187841217; 52°02′22″N 0°39′01″E		1123280	Upload Photo	Q26416376
Clarks Farmhouse	II	North Road			7 August 1952	TL8208041457; 52°02′30″N 0°39′13″E		1337891	Upload Photo	Q26622253
Fishers Farmhouse Including Single Storey Range to Rear	II	North Road			21 June 1962	TL8183941262; 52°02′24″N 0°39′00″E		1123279	Upload Photo	Q26416375
Rippingales	II	North Road			7 August 1952	TL8184040966; 52°02′14″N 0°38′59″E		1123278	Upload Photo	Q26416373
Village Hall	II	North Road			22 August 1986	TL8191940624; 52°02′03″N 0°39′02″E		1337889	Upload Photo	Q26622251
Little Beechwood	II	Puttock End			22 August 1986	TL8057740465; 52°01′59″N 0°37′52″E		1123283	Upload Photo	Q26416380
Town House	II	Soft Road			22 August 1986	TL8171640474; 52°01′58″N 0°38′52″E		1306456	Upload Photo	Q26593235

== See also ==
- Grade I listed buildings in Essex
- Grade II* listed buildings in Essex

== Sources ==
- Bettley, James; Pevsner, Nikolaus (2007) [1954], Essex, The Buildings of England, New Haven and London: Yale University Press, ISBN 978-0-300-11614-4
