= Knowl Green =

Hamlet in Essex, England

Coordinates: 52.0423°N 0.5992°E

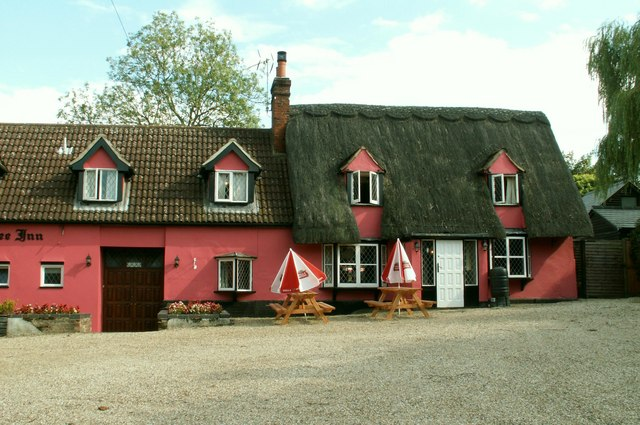
- Cherry Tree Inn, Knowl Green

- Location within Essex
- OS grid reference: TL7834
- Civil parish: Belchamp St Paul
- District: Braintree
- Shire county: Essex
- Region: East
- Country: England
- Sovereign state: United Kingdom
- Post town: SUDBURY
- Postcode district: CO10
- Police: Essex
- Fire: Essex
- Ambulance: East of England
- UK Parliament: Braintree

Knowl Green is a hamlet in the civil parish of Belchamp St Paul and the Braintree district of Essex, England.

The hamlet is approximately 6 miles (10 km) west from the town of Sudbury, Suffolk and 23 miles (37 km) north-northeast from the county town and city of Chelmsford. It is where Gage's Road from Belchamp St Paul village at the north-east, and Belchamps Road from Tilbury Juxta Clare at the south-west, meet at the junction of Pollard's Green Lane which leads north to Ovington.

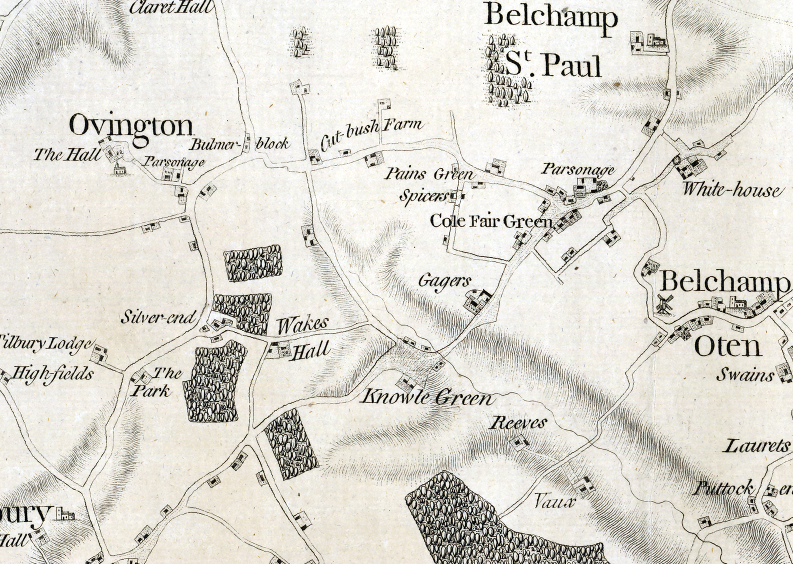
Knowl Green in 1777

Knowl Green comprises houses, cottages, two farms with associated buildings, and the Cherry Tree public house. The Cherry Tree was recorded as such in 1933. An arm of Belchamp Brook, a tributary of the River Stour, rises at the north of Knowl Green and flows by the hamlet.

There are seven Grade II listed buildings in Knowl Green. Hole Farmhouse is an early 19th-century timber-framed house at the north of the junction, with, 44 yards (40 m) to the south, an associated timber-framed and weatherboarded late 19th-century cartshed. Woodbarn's Farmhouse, at the south of the junction, is a timber-framed and plastered house dating to the 15th century. At the west of the hamlet on Belchamp Road are two conjoined two-storey 18th-century cottages, timber-framed, with brick corners and flint infill. At the east of the hamlet at the north side of Gage's Road is a 17th-century timber-framed thatch-roofed cottage. Opposite, and set back at the south of the road is a further 17th-century timber-framed thatch-roofed cottage. Near this cottage, and on Gage's Road, is The Cherry Tree Inn, timber-framed and plastered, and with gable dormers, dating to the late 17th century, with a 20th-century extension.
