= Bruce Mahalski =

New Zealand artist

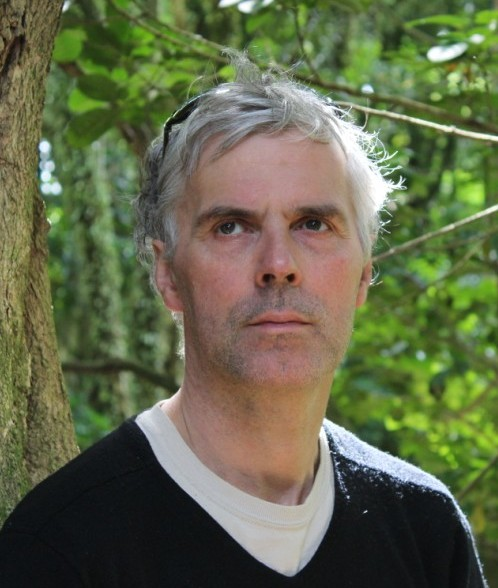
- Mahalski in 2017
- Born: Dunedin, New Zealand
- Known for: street art, illustration, sculpture
- Website: www.mahalski.org

Bruce Mahalski is a Dunedin artist, known for his illustration, street murals, and sculpture incorporating animal bones. He is founder and director of the Dunedin Museum of Natural Mystery, a private museum of natural history and ethnographic objects and curios.

== Life ==
Mahalski was born in Dunedin, New Zealand, the only child of two academics; his father, Dr E. R. Nye, was a physician and researcher at Otago Medical School, and his mother Pauline Mahalski was a teacher of psychology. Both were collectors of biological curiosities and ephemera, and Mahalski credits them with inspiring his own collecting. From the age of eight he collected shells, fossils, insects, crabs, and bones, and the skins of small animals. As a teenager, Mahalski worked as an unofficial intern at the Otago Museum and dreamed of opening his own museum one day.

Mahalski graduated with a science degree and worked for a time in fisheries research.

== Music ==
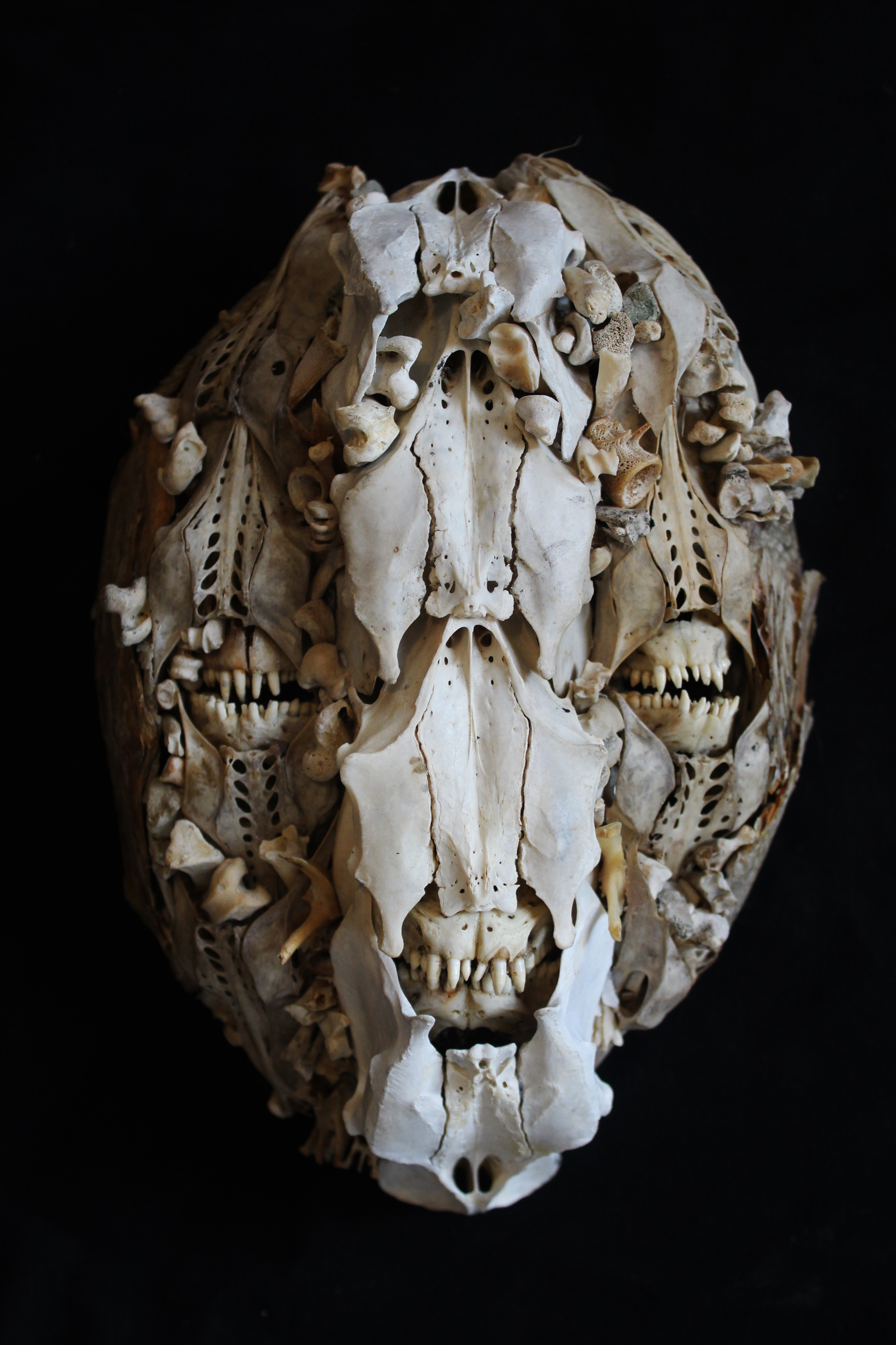
Manu Ika Bird Man Mask, a life-size mask made from fish and bird bones

Mahalski fronted several bands in the 1980s. In 1983 with Mike Weston he formed Crystal Zoom!, and they were joined in 1984 by Robin Murphy (bass) and Barry Blackler (drums), both from Dunedin band The Idles. Crystal Zoom! had two 1984 cassette releases, and in 1985 a single on the Flying Nun label called Dunedin Sound on 45, a medley of Dunedin bands set to the hand-clap disco beat well known from 1980s albums such as Hooked on Classics. Dunedin musicians Martin Phillipps and David Kilgour played their own compositions in the medley. Phillipps later asked Mahalski to create cover art for The Chills' album Silver Bullets.

Mahalski and Weston moved to Waiheke Island, Auckland in 1985 and reformed Crystal Zoom! with a new rhythm section. They began to experiment with four-track recording, incorporating masks, photography, and slide shows in their live performances. The band was less successful, and Mahalski moved back to Dunedin, reuniting with Robin Murphy and other former Idles to form Let's Get Naked. The first Let's Get Naked album, Something Like That (1987), was the third release of Dunedin non-profit label Rational Records. It included the minor hit 'Funky Dunedin'.

== Art ==
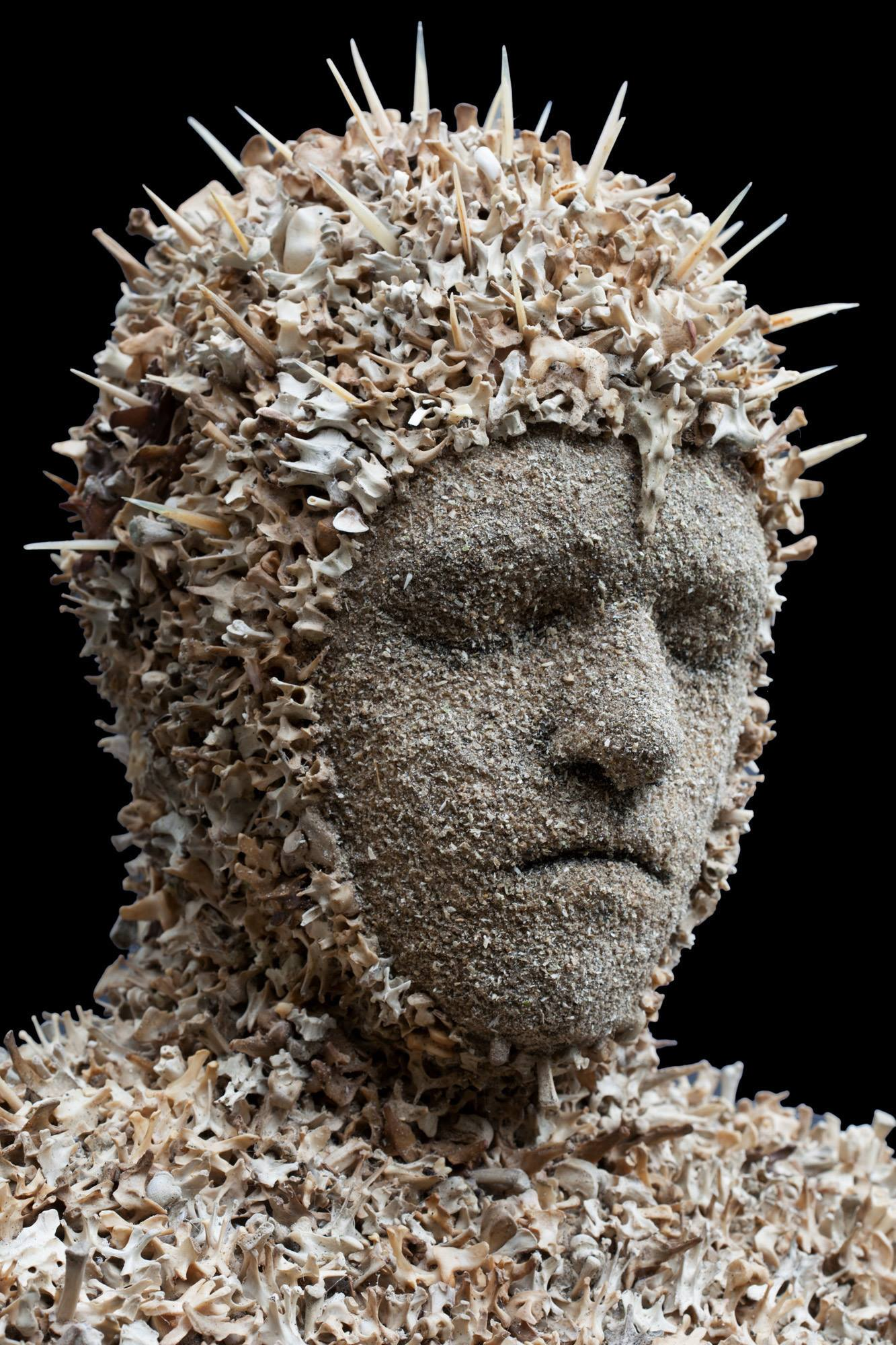
Kiribati Warrior (2013), a life-size bust made from animal bones, fish spines and crushed bone

When Crystal Zoom! moved from Dunedin to Auckland in 1985, Mahalski began drawing the strip cartoon Zak Water Buffalo, about a musician and music journalist, for BiFM magazine. The strips later appeared in Rip It Up and Otago University's Critic magazine, and Mahalski collected his cartoons in a self-published compilation called Biohazard in 1990. Mahalski has been exhibiting and selling art since 1996, exhibiting screen-printing, sculpture, painting, and photography. He is a lifelong pacifist and environmentalist, and both of these are themes in his art.

"Sometimes I feel overwhelmed by my social conscience. I’m not talking about my love for humanity. It’s the world of nature that’s screaming in my ear."

=== Bone art ===
Mahalski creates what he calls "textural bone art": assemblages of animal skulls and bones. "I started seeing bones as like paint", he told film-maker Michael Hall. His artworks occasionally include human bone, to make the point that humans are just another animal: "I don't accept that there's any spiritual distinction between the bone of a human and the bone of a sheep or a rat." Skulls to Mahalski are special, connecting humans to the rest of nature and acting as a link to our biological past. "I see skulls and these objects as like spiritual telephones to other dimensions." He is strongly influenced by collections of ethnological art and the works created by societies before Western contact.

The raw materials for Mahalski's bone art are sourced from collecting trips on the beach and countryside, or found as roadkill. His first bone art show, 2005's Full Spectrum Dominance, covered plastic machine guns with tiny bones to protest the war on terror and the militarisation of children's toys. By 2010 he was specialising in textural bone sculptures.

In 2014 Mahalski collaborated with the Wellington luthier David Gilberd to build a functioning slide guitar completely covered with animal bones, including 35 skulls, using trimmed cow ribs as frets.

=== Street art ===
Mahalski has created numerous street murals, often depicting animals or the marine environment. His 2012 mural Electric Soup in Orchard Place, London, depicts marine animals, including electric rays (referencing the nearby laboratory site of electromagnetism pioneer Michael Faraday). Mahalski has also been a keen sponsor of others' work, raising money to bring British street artists like Phelgm and Cityzenkane to work and collaborate in New Zealand through his group Vivid Wellington. Mahalski organised the creation of a mural of New Zealand artist Rita Angus in Bond St, Wellington, painted by street artist Askew One (Elliott O'Donnell). It was completed in January 2019.

In 2019 Mahalski began a series of animal murals on Dunedin streets, referencing the specimens on display in Otago Museum's "Animal Attic". Animals depicted include badgers, sharks, an argonaut, a secretary bird, and a porcupine fish.

=== Museum of Natural Mystery ===
See Dunedin Museum of Natural Mystery

After moving back to Dunedin in 2017, Mahalski converted the front of his Royal Terrace house into a private museum of "biological curiosities, ethnological art and unusual cultural artefacts". He believes the roles of artist and collector cannot be separated and sees his entire collection as a work of art.

== Publications ==
- Mahalski, Bruce and Hunter, Abe. (2024). A Change in the Weather. Dunedin Museum of Natural Mystery. ISBN 9780473720377
- Hilton, Craig and Mahalski, Bruce. (2018). Seeds of Life: The Bone Art of Bruce Mahalski. Rim Books. ISBN 9780994130679
- Mahalski, Bruce. (2005). New Zealand's golden days. Gilt Edge Publishing: Wellington. ISBN 1877404128
- Mahalski, Bruce. (2005). Pounamu. Gilt Edge Publishing: Wellington. ISBN 9781877404139
