= Little Henny =

Hamlet in Essex, England

Coordinates: 52.014°N 0.707°E

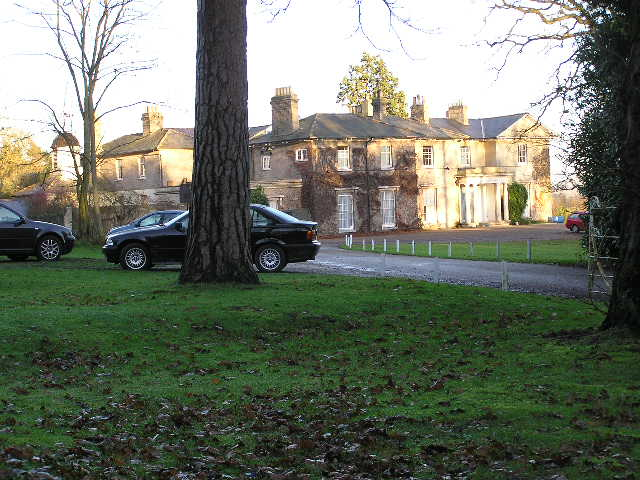
- The Ryes

- Location within Essex
- Population: 48 (Parish, 2021)
- Civil parish: Little Henny
- District: Braintree
- Shire county: Essex
- Region: East
- Country: England
- Sovereign state: United Kingdom

Little Henny (previously spelt Little Henney) is a hamlet and civil parish in the Braintree district in the county of Essex, England. It is near the town of Sudbury in Suffolk. At the 2021 census the parish had a population of 48.

Little Henny shares a grouped parish council with the neighbouring parishes of Great Henny, Middleton, and Twinstead, called The Hennys, Middleton and Twinstead Parish Council.

== History ==
Little Henny is located in between Great Henny and Bulmer Tye, and was formerly a parish in the hundred of Hinckford, and the poor union of Sudbury. The name Henny comes from the Old English words heah and eg, meaning high island. Little Henny and Great Henny were listed as Heni in the Domesday Book of 1086, with a population of 35, putting it in the largest 20% of settlements recorded. In 1894, the civil parish was transferred to the newly formed Belchamp Rural District, which included parishes along the Suffolk and Essex border. In 1934, the civil parish transferred to Halstead Rural District under a County Review Order designated in the Local Government Act of 1929. The district was abolished under the Local Government Act 1972 and the civil parish was transferred to Braintree District. In 1976, Little Henny civil parish was grouped with Great Henny, Middleton and Twinstead by Order of Braintree District Council. Great Henny, Middleton and Twinstead are served by three parish councillors each while Little Henny is served by one.

Unusually for a parish in the area, it has no standing church - though the foundations of a medieval church exist which was believed to have been destroyed by 1600. However the parish continued to be served by Rectors who were based in Sudbury, and the Rector paid an annual stipend to St Mary's Church at Great Henny for parishioners to have access to the pews and be buried in the graveyard. Samuel Crossman was one such rector at Little Henny before being ejected from the Anglican church in 1662. The church was subject to an archaeological dig by F.H. Fairweather in the 1930s and has been a scheduled monument since 2001. The earliest parts of the church use Barnack stone, which indicates that it was built during the second half of the 12th century, while the church was reconstructed at some point during the 14th or 15th century when it was made smaller. In the census of 1831, it was reported that parish of Little Henny had a population of 59.

Little Henny is home to 7 listed buildings. Rye Hall is a Grade II listed 17th century house incorporating remains of an earlier building that was remodelled in the 19th century, and was formerly a moated site. The Ryes, formerly known as Rye Lodge, is a Grade II Georgian House designed by Robert Lugar, whose engraving of the house and its plans were exhibited at the Royal Academy of Arts in 1809. The house was recognised by Nikolaus Pevsner during his survey of Essex. From the 20th century up to 2011, the Ryes was home to a school. Both buildings are named after the local Rye River, which in turn was named after the former Lord of the Manor, John de Ry.
