= Henny Street =

Hamlet in Essex, England

Coordinates: 52.0125°N 0.7372°E

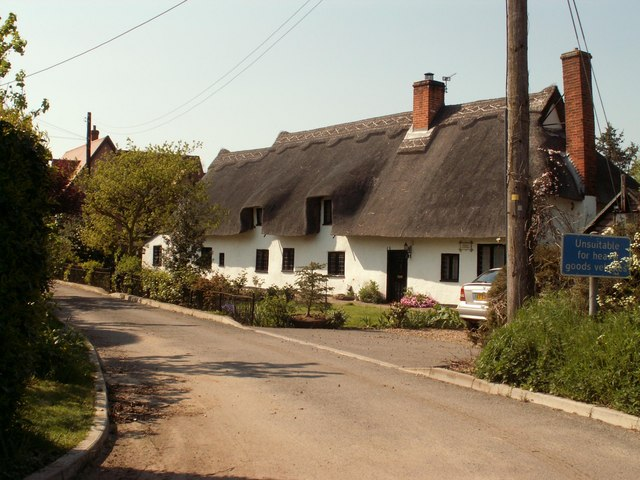
- Late 14th-century 'Henny Cottage'

- Location within Essex
- OS grid reference: TL879384
- Civil parish: Great Henny
- District: Braintree
- Shire county: Essex
- Region: East
- Country: England
- Sovereign state: United Kingdom
- Post town: SUDBURY
- Postcode district: CO10
- Police: Essex
- Fire: Essex
- Ambulance: East of England

Henny Street is a hamlet in the civil parish of Great Henny and the Braintree district of Essex, England. The hamlet is on Henny Road at the east of the parish and adjacent to the west bank of the River Stour.

Henny Street is a linear hamlet south from, but incorporating, the junction of the road to Middleton, the adjacent parish to the north. The hamlet holds three Grade II listed buildings. Henny Cottage dates to the 14th century, was formerly a hall house and is plastered, timber framed and thatched. The timber framed, plastered and gabled Street Farmhouse, the focus of Street Farm, dates to the 15th century with later additions and alterations. Mill House, on the Stour side of the hamlet is early 19th century, plastered over timber framing. Between Mill house and the Stour is the redeveloped site of the former Henny Mill which was a water powered corn mill, later using steam, served by the Stour. To the north from Street Farm is The Swan public house and restaurant, whose facilities include ground across Henny Road to the Stour. Within the property at the edge of the Stour are the remains of a Second World War Type 22 pillbox.

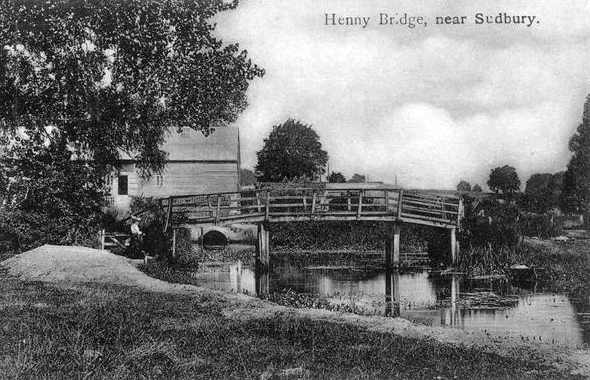
Henny Mill c.1905

The Swan and its victuallers are listed in trade directories from at least 1848 to at least 1933. Up to 1914 the victualler was also blacksmith, however, in 1863 he was also a farmer, and in 1894, a brewer. The miller at Henny Mill was the same person from at least 1863 to later than 1902. By 1914, the miller's executors were in control, the mill listed as using steam as well as water power, and from 1902 to at least 1914, the miller was also a baker. A miller was still trading in 1933. Farmers at Street Farm were listed from 1848 to 1933, the farmer in 1902 also employing a bailiff.
