= Borley Church =

Parish church in Essex

Coordinates: 52°03′18.5″N 0°41′35.7″E

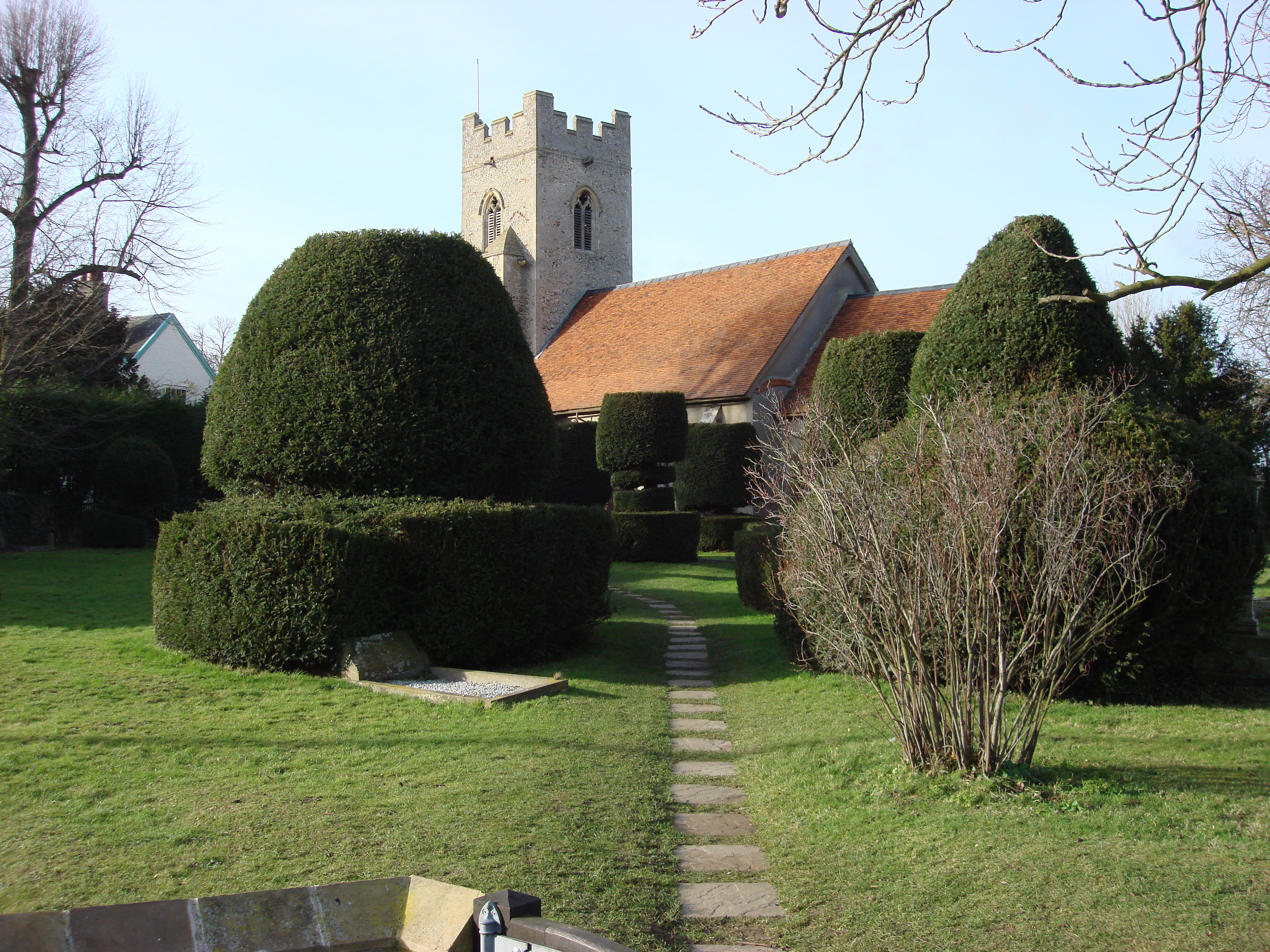
Borley Church

Borley Church is the parish church in Borley, Essex, England. The church is in the ecclesiastical parish of Borley and Liston, one of the Fifteen Churches of the North Hinckford Benefice in the Diocese of Chelmsford of the Church of England. The church is a Grade I listed building, notable for its topiary walk and a large monument to Sir Edward Waldegrave (a member of Queen Mary I's privy council) and his wife.

== Description and history ==
The church (dedication unknown) is a small building of stone; the nave may date to the 11th century. Later renovations have resulted in the mainly perpendicular style of the mid-14th to 16th centuries, still visible in the chancel and the western tower. The church as it now stands consists of chancel, nave, south porch and a crenellated western tower containing three bells, two of which were cast by Alfred Bowell of Ipswich in 1926, and one from 1574 cast by S II Tonni. They hang in their original oak frame with evidence a fourth bell may once have been present. There is a topiary walk leading to the porch, with bushes once shaped like Indian chess pieces. The path was once flagstones; however, in 2017 a wheelchair-friendly brick path was installed with side lights. It is designated by English Heritage as a Grade I listed building. Grade I is the highest of the three grades of listing, granted to buildings that "are of exceptional interest, sometimes considered to be internationally important".

Not long after 1545, the manor was granted to Sir Edward Waldegrave (knighted in 1553 at the coronation of Queen Mary I, died in the Tower of London on 1 September 1561) by Henry VIII. After the death of Edward VI, Waldegrave was admitted to Queen Mary's privy council and granted the manor of Navestock, where he moved the family seat. In addition Waldegrave was Master of the Wardrobe for Queen Mary and her husband, Philip II of Spain.

The chancel contains a monument to John Durham of Norfolk. Several tombs of the Waldegrave family are found within the structure, including a monument 14 feet high, 9 feet long, and 5 feet wide, with a cornice supported by six pillars of the Corinthian order, beneath which lie full-length marble figures of Sir Edward Waldegrave and his wife Lady Frances Waldegrave née Neville (died 1599). Both tombs bear a marginal inscription in Latin and a record of other alliances of this family. On the chancel's north wall is a devotional statue of Magdala Southcote, Walgrave's daughter, who died 8 September 1598 (Nikolaus Pevsner notes it, but calls it "not good"). The church contains memorials to two 19th-century rectors, John Philip Herringham and his son William Herringham. John Philip was a Pembroke graduate and one of the signees of a declaration protesting the Maynooth Grant in 1845; William entered Peterhouse, Cambridge.

The glebe was 10 acres (4.0 ha) in the mid-19th century; in both 1821 and 1831 the parish had 195 inhabitants.

== Claims of haunting ==
The church is claimed to be haunted although with much less activity than the former Borley Rectory. Alleged paranormal activity includes "phantom organ music, ghostly chanting, and the ghost of a nun moving about the churchyard". Ghost stories from the church and the rectory are frequently connected to a supposed Benedictine monastery in the area.

The legend about the ghostly monks that appear in both Borley Church and the nearby Rectory says that the Monk, a member of a Benedictine community existing in that area, had begun to maintain a forbidden relationship with a Nun from nearby Barking Abbey. They wanted to move in together openly as a couple, but unfortunately, their love affair was discovered. The monk was sentenced to death by hanging and the nun was walled up alive within the walls of the Barking Convent.

In the 1970s, after receiving several reports about bells mysteriously ringing late at night and the presence of a ghostly headless monk leaving cryptic messages on the church walls, the famous paranormal investigators Ed and Lorraine Warren arrived at the church to investigate the supernatural activity there. The Warrens and a group of photographers called for the investigation found the ghostly nun wandering around the Cemetery, and then, inside the church, they encountered the same figure walking through the halls, apparently praying.
