= Middleton, Essex =

Village in Essex, England

Coordinates: 52.02266°N 0.72664°E

Middleton
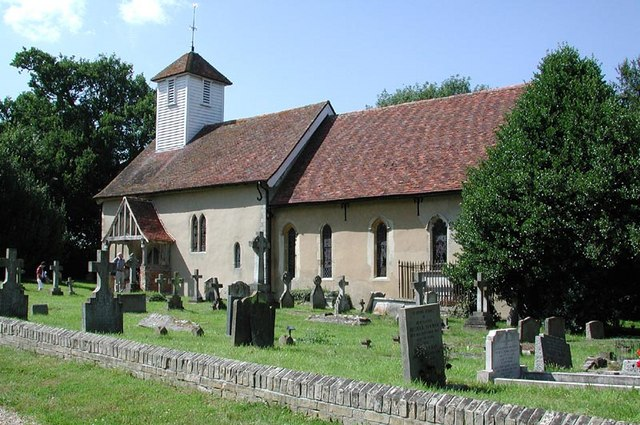
- All Saints' Church, Middleton

- Location within Essex
- Population: 128 (Parish, 2021)
- OS grid reference: TL870395
- Civil parish: Middleton
- District: Braintree
- Shire county: Essex
- Region: East
- Country: England
- Sovereign state: United Kingdom
- Post town: SUDBURY
- Postcode district: CO10
- Police: Essex
- Fire: Essex
- Ambulance: East of England

Middleton is a village and civil parish in the Braintree District of Essex, England. The village is 1 mile (1.6 km) south from the Ballingdon suburb of the market town of Sudbury. The parish, which is 2 miles (3.2 km) east to west and less than 1 mile north to south, is bordered at the north and east by the county of Suffolk, at the west by the Essex parish of Bulmer and the A131 road, and at the south by the Essex parishes of Little Henny and Great Henny. The River Stour also forms the eastern border. At the 2021 census the parish had a population of 128. Middleton shares a grouped parish council with the neighbouring parishes of Great Henny, Little Henny, and Twinstead, called The Hennys, Middleton and Twinstead Parish Council.

In the north of the parish at Middleton Hall Farm is small light industrial and services park which includes a vehicle sales company and the headquarters of a turkey farm. This was the only farm and only trade listed in 1882 and 1914. By 1894 a carpenter was trading, and in 1902, a baker. The parish contained a mixed National School for 40 children, built in 1875. This had become a Public Elementary School by 1914. Earlier, in 1818, the parish population of 90 had no school.

At the end of the 19th-century parish area varied from 868 acres (3.5 km^{2}) to 890 acres (3.6 km^{2}). Parish soil was of clay, loam and gravel, on which was grown wheat, barley, beans and turnips. Between 1881 and 1911, the population dropped from 165 to 133.

The Parish Church of All Saints', which dates to the mid-12th century, is a Grade I listed building. Within the church chancel is a 14th-century Purbeck marble figurative floor slab to the memory of a rector of Middleton, died 1349. The parish register dates to 1700. The church seats 150. All Saints' Church was restored in the 19th century, when the bell turret and south porch were rebuilt, a vestry added to the north, and an organ chamber installed. The living at the time was a rectory with a residence and 40 acres (0.2 km^{2}) of glebe – land used for the support of the parish priest and church. In 1882 an oil-on-canvas painting of the Annunciation was reported to be above All Saints' chancel arch, which might have been the work of the 16th-century artist Andrea Schiavone. The rectory house was noted between 1882 and 1902, but not in 1914, as "beautifully situated with a small park in front and contains a splendid collection of oil and water colour paintings by English, Dutch, Flemish, French and Italian masters".

At the centre of Middleton Hall Farm is Middleton Hall, built in 1864 but today unlisted; it is part surrounded by a mutilated rectangular moat as a listed monument.

A Grade II listed thatched two-storey cottage dating to the 17th century is 250 yards (229 m) southeast from the church on a minor road to Henny Street. South from the church by 60 yards (55 m), and with access from Rectory Road is Queens Beeches, a Grade II listed early 19th-century grey brick house with attached stables and carriage house.
