= Borley Rectory =

Building in Borley, Essex, England

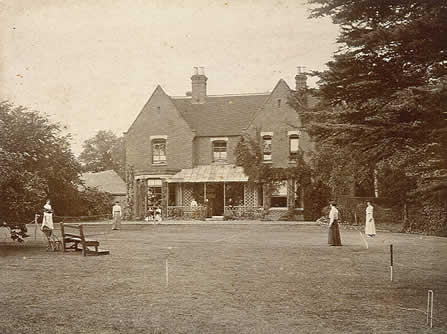
- The east face of the rectory in 1892
- Interactive map of the Borley Rectory area

General information
- Status: Demolished
- Type: Rectory
- Architectural style: Gothic Revival
- Location: Borley, Essex, England
- Coordinates: 52.0546°N 0.6942°E
- Completed: 1862
- Demolished: 1944

Height
- Height: 35ft (10.6m)

Technical details
- Floor count: 4
- Floor area: Approx 7,500 sq ft (696.7 sq m)
- Grounds: 11 acres (4.45 hectares)

Other information
- Number of rooms: 32 (11 bedrooms)

Borley Rectory was a house located in Borley, Essex, famous for being described as "the most haunted house in England" by psychic researcher Harry Price. Built in 1862 to house the rector of the parish of Borley and his family, the house was badly damaged by fire in 1939 and demolished in 1944.

The large Gothic-style rectory had been alleged to be haunted ever since it was built. These reports multiplied suddenly in 1929 after the Daily Mirror newspaper published an account of a visit by Price, who wrote two books supporting claims of paranormal activity.

Price's reports prompted a formal study by the Society for Psychical Research (SPR), which rejected most of the sightings as either imagined or fabricated and cast doubt on Price's credibility. His claims are now generally discredited by ghost historians. However, neither the SPR's report nor the more recent biography of Price has quelled public interest in these stories, and new books and television documentaries continue to satisfy public fascination with the rectory.

A short programme commissioned by the BBC about the alleged manifestations, scheduled to be broadcast in September 1956, was cancelled owing to concerns about a possible legal action by Marianne Foyster, widow of the last rector to live in Borley Rectory. In 1975, the BBC aired a programme entitled The Ghost Hunters that focused on the house and conducted interviews with several psychic researchers, including Peter Underwood. It also featured a late-night psychic investigation of nearby Borley Church.

== History ==
Borley Rectory was constructed on Hall Road in the village of Borley, Essex, in 1862, near Borley Church. The house was built by the Reverend Henry Dawson Ellis Bull; he moved in a year after being named rector of the parish. The house replaced an earlier rectory on the site that had been destroyed by fire in 1841. It was eventually enlarged by the addition of a wing to house Bull's family of fourteen children.

The nearby church, the nave of which may date from the 12th century, serves a scattered rural community of three hamlets that make up the parish. There are several substantial farmhouses and the fragmentary remains of Borley Hall, once the seat of the Waldegrave family. Legend claims that a Benedictine monastery was supposedly built in this area in about 1362, and that a monk from the monastery conducted a relationship with a nun from a nearby convent. After their affair was discovered, the monk was executed and the nun reportedly bricked up alive in the convent walls. This legend was debunked in 1938 as it was confirmed that it had no historical basis known and could have been fabricated by the rector's children to romanticise the rectory. The story of the walling up of the nun may have come from Rider Haggard's novel Montezuma's Daughter (1893) or Walter Scott's epic poem Marmion (1808).

== Hauntings ==
The first paranormal events at Borley Rectory reportedly occurred in about 1863, since a few locals later remembered having heard unexplained footsteps within the house at about that time. On 28 July 1900, four of Bull's daughters saw what they thought was the ghost of a nun at twilight, about 40 yards (37 m) from the house; they tried to talk to it, but it disappeared as they got closer. Local organist Ernest Ambrose later said that the Bull family were "very convinced that they had seen an apparition on several occasions". Various people claimed to have witnessed a variety of puzzling incidents, such as a phantom coach driven by two headless horsemen, during the next four decades. Bull died in 1892 and his son, the Reverend Henry ("Harry") Foyster Bull, took over the parish.

Upon Harry Bull's death on 9 June 1927, Borley Rectory became vacant. In the following year, on 2 October, the Reverend Guy Eric Smith and his wife moved into the house. Soon after moving in, Smith's wife, while cleaning out a cupboard, reportedly came across a brown paper package containing the skull of a young woman. Shortly afterwards, the family reported a variety of incidents, including the sounds of servant bells ringing despite being disconnected, lights appearing in windows, and unexplained footsteps. In addition, Smith's wife believed she saw a horse-drawn carriage at night.

The Smiths contacted the Daily Mirror newspaper asking to be put in touch with the Society for Psychical Research (SPR). On 10 June 1929, the newspaper sent a reporter, who promptly wrote the first in a series of articles detailing the mysteries of Borley Rectory. The paper also arranged for Harry Price, a paranormal researcher, to make his first visit to the house. He arrived on 12 June and immediately phenomena of a new kind appeared, such as the throwing of stones, a vase and other objects. "Spirit messages" were tapped out from the frame of a mirror. As soon as Price left, these occurrences ceased. Smith's wife later maintained that she suspected Price, an expert conjurer, of falsifying the phenomena.

The Smiths left Borley on 14 July 1929, and the parish had some difficulty in finding a replacement. On 16 October 1930, the Reverend Lionel Algernon Foyster (1878–1945), a first cousin of the Bulls, and his wife Marianne (1899–1992) moved into the house along with their adopted daughter Adelaide. Foyster wrote an account of various strange incidents that occurred between the time his family moved in and October 1935, which was sent to Price. These included bell-ringing, windows shattering, the throwing of stones and bottles, wall-writing and the locking of Adelaide in a room with no key. Marianne reported to her husband a whole range of poltergeist phenomena that included her being thrown from her bed. On one occasion, Adelaide was attacked by "something horrible". Foyster tried twice to conduct an exorcism, but his efforts were fruitless; in the middle of the first exorcism, he was struck in the shoulder by a fist-size stone.

Because of coverage of the case by the Daily Mirror, these incidents attracted the attention of several paranormal researchers, who after investigation were unanimous in suspecting that they were caused, consciously or unconsciously, by Marianne. She later said that she felt that some of the incidents were caused by her husband in concert with one of the psychic researchers, but other events appeared to her to be genuine paranormal phenomena. Marianne later admitted that she was having a sexual relationship with a lodger named Frank Pearless, (Note: Pearless styled himself François D'Arles, and in his diaries Lionel Foyster refers to him as "Frank Lawless".) and that she used paranormal explanations to cover up her liaisons.

The Foyster family left Borley in October 1935 as a result of Lionel Foyster's ill health.

== Price investigation ==
Borley Rectory remained vacant for some time after the Foysters' departure. In May 1937, Price took out a year-long rental agreement with Queen Anne's Bounty, the owners of the property. Through an advertisement printed in The Times on 25 May 1937, and subsequent personal interviews, he recruited a corps of 48 "official observers", mostly students, who spent periods, mainly during weekends, at the house with instructions to report any phenomena that occurred.

In March 1938, Helen Glanville (the daughter of S. J. Glanville, one of Price's helpers) conducted a planchette séance in Streatham, London. Price reported that she made contact with two spirits, the first of which was that of a young nun who identified herself as Marie Lairre. According to the planchette story, Marie was a French nun who left her religious order and travelled to England to marry a member of the Waldegrave family. She was said to have been murdered in an older building on the site of Borley Rectory, and her body was either buried in the cellar or thrown into a disused well. The wall-writings were alleged to be her pleas for help; one read, "Marianne, please help me get out".

The second spirit to be contacted identified himself as Sunex Amures, and claimed that he would set fire to Borley Rectory at nine o'clock that night, 27 March 1938. He also said that, at that time, the bones of a murdered person would be revealed.

=== Fire ===
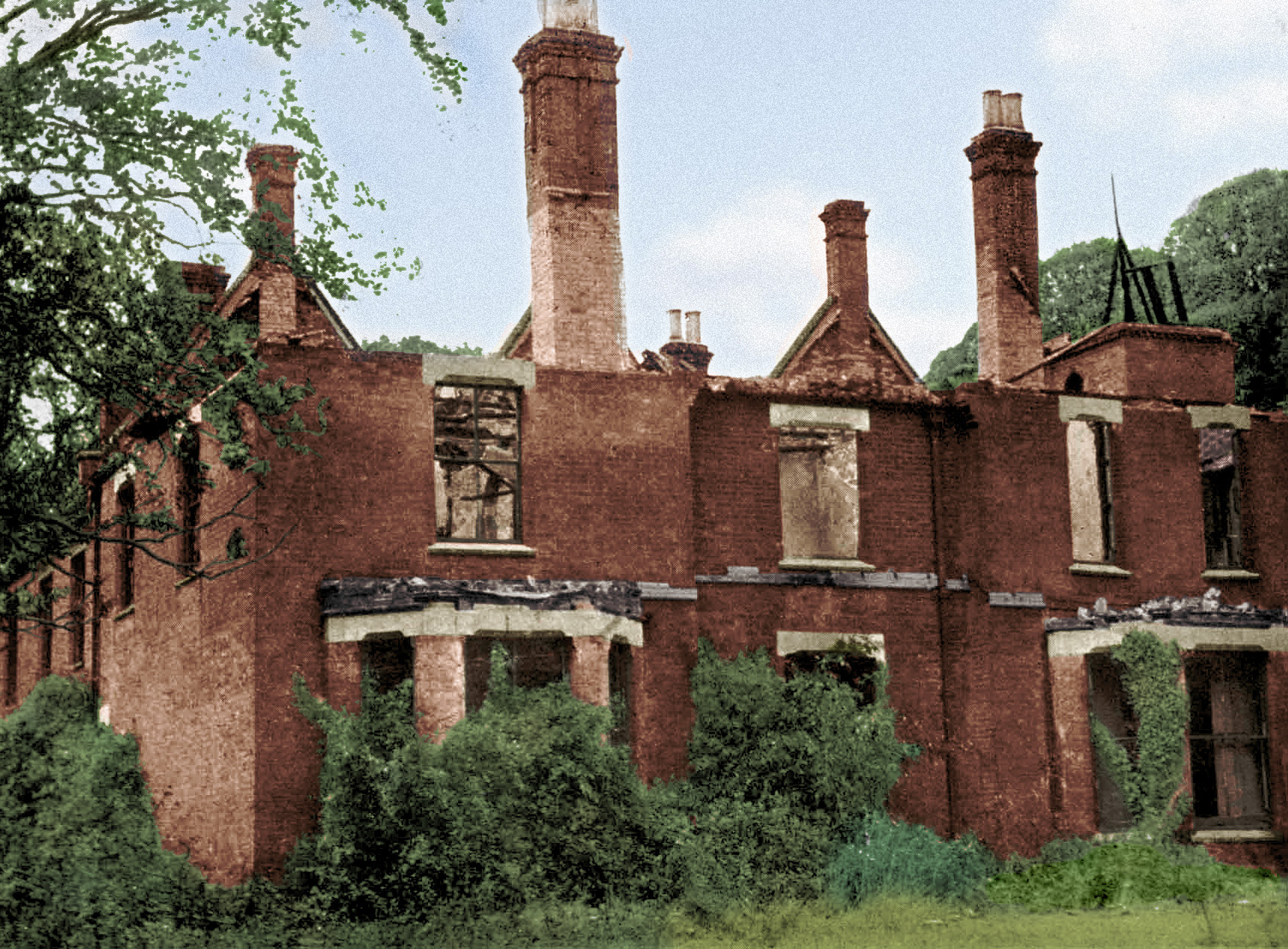
Rectory after the fire

On 27 February 1939, the new owner of Borley Rectory, Captain W. H. Gregson, was unpacking boxes and accidentally knocked over an oil lamp in the hallway. The house was never connected to a gas or electricity supply, and water was obtained from a well in the courtyard. The fire quickly spread and the house was severely damaged. After investigating the cause of the blaze, the insurance company concluded that the fire seemed to have been started deliberately.

A Miss Williams from nearby Borley Lodge said she saw the figure of the ghostly nun in the upstairs window during the fire and, according to Harry Price, demanded a fee of one guinea for her story. In August 1943, Price conducted a brief dig in the cellars of the ruined house and discovered two bones thought to be of a young woman. The bones were given a Christian burial in Liston churchyard, after the parish of Borley refused to allow the ceremony to take place on account of the local opinion that the bones found belonged to a pig.

== Society for Psychical Research investigation ==
After Price's death in 1948, Daily Mail reporter Charles Sutton accused him of faking phenomena. Sutton claimed that whilst visiting Borley Rectory with Price in 1929, he was hit on the head by a large pebble. Sutton stated that he seized Price and found his coat pockets filled with different sized stones.

In 1948, Eric Dingwall, K. M. Goldney and Trevor H. Hall, three members of the SPR, two of whom had been Price's most loyal associates, investigated his claims about Borley Rectory. Their findings were published in a 1956 book, The Haunting of Borley Rectory, which concluded that Price had fraudulently produced some of the phenomena.

The "Borley Report", as the SPR study has become known, stated that many of the phenomena were either faked or due to natural causes, such as rats and the strange acoustics attributed to the odd shape of the house. In their conclusion, the three authors wrote, "[W]hen analysed, the evidence for haunting and poltergeist activity for each and every period appears to diminish in force and finally to vanish away." Terence Hines wrote that "Mrs. Marianne Foyster, wife of the Rev. Lionel Foyster who lived at the rectory from 1930 to 1935, was actively engaged in fraudulently creating [haunted] phenomena. Price himself 'salted the mine' and faked several phenomena while he was at the rectory."

Marianne Foyster later admitted she had seen no apparitions and that the alleged ghostly noises were caused by the wind, friends she invited to the house and in other cases by herself playing practical jokes on her husband. Many of the legends about Borley Rectory had also been invented. The children of the Rev. Harry Bull, who lived in the house before Lionel Foyster, claimed to have seen nothing and were surprised they had been living in what was described as England's most haunted house.

Robert Hastings was one of the few SPR researchers to defend Price. Price's literary executor, Paul Tabori, and SPR researcher Peter Underwood have also defended Price against accusations of fraud. A similar approach was made by Ivan Banks in 1996. Michael Coleman, in an SPR report in 1997, wrote that Price's defenders were unable to rebut the criticisms convincingly.

== Film ==
In 2017, the part-animated film Borley Rectory: The Most Haunted House in England was released. It was written and directed by Ashley Thorpe and starred Reece Shearsmith and Jonathan Rigby.

In 2021, the feature film The Ghosts of Borley Rectory was released. It was written and directed by Steven M. Smith and starred Julian Sands, Toyah Willcox, Colin Baker and Christopher Ellison.

In 2025, the feature film Borley Rectory: The Awakening set in 1900 showed the origins of the ghost story. It was written and directed by Steven M. Smith and starred Julian Glover, Patsy Kensit, Helen Lederer, Vicki Michelle, and Mark Wingett.

== See also ==
- List of ghosts
