= Twinstead =

Village in Essex, England

Coordinates: 51.997°N 0.711°E

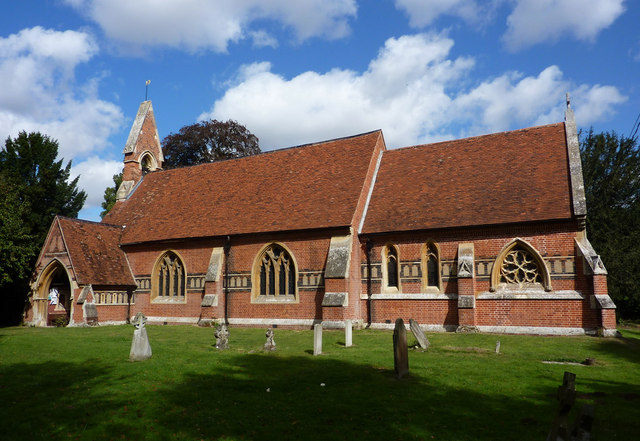
- Church of St John the Evangelist, Twinstead

- Location within Essex
- Population: 154 (Parish, 2021)
- OS grid reference: TL8588236642
- Civil parish: Twinstead
- District: Braintree
- Shire county: Essex
- Region: East
- Country: England
- Sovereign state: United Kingdom
- Post town: Sudbury
- Postcode district: CO10
- Dialling code: 01787
- Police: Essex
- Fire: Essex
- Ambulance: East of England
- UK Parliament: Braintree
- Website: The Hennys', Middleton & Twinstead Parish Council

Twinstead is a village and civil parish in the Braintree district of Essex, England. At the 2021 census the parish had a population of 154. Twinstead shares a grouped parish council with the neighbouring parishes of Great Henny, Little Henny, and Middleton, called The Hennys, Middleton and Twinstead Parish Council.

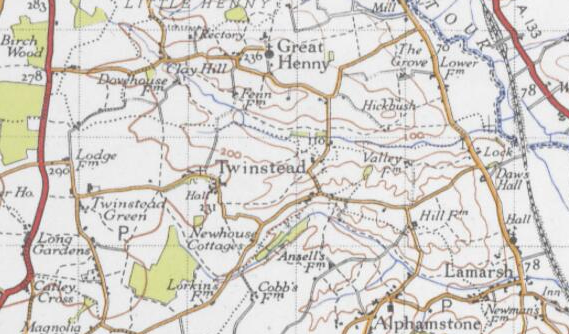
1945 map of Twinstead

Today, the village is made up of many farms, a riding school, a manor house and an Essex Volvo's business. It has one place of worship which is the Church of St John the Evangelist, which is a Grade II* listed building.

== The church ==
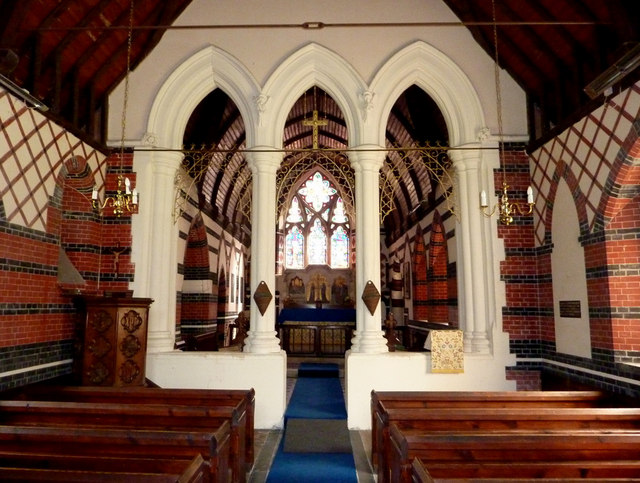
Interior design of The Church of St John the Evangelist

On this site it is the fourth church to be built, the first being ruined in 1790, the second being pulled down, the third having been deemed as having "no ecclesiastical character": finally a fourth rebuild was necessary. The church was built in 1859-60, it reflects the influence of William Butterfield and was designed by Henry Woodyer. It is comparable to the model church of All Saints’, Margaret Street. The exterior is made from red bricks with stone dressings, however the interior is far more richly decorated. Black and red brickwork runs along each wall with orange-brown lattice above it. The church's Victorian design distinguishes it from those in the surrounding area. However, the bell is the oldest part of the church dating back to the early 16th century, which was then rehung in 1976. What makes it even more special is that:

“Twinstead Church is thought to be one of only three churches in England featuring three equal arches of stone in the entrance to the chancel from the nave and certainly the only one if its kind in a rural setting.”

== History ==
=== Etymology ===
The name Twinstead was first recorded in the Domesday Book as Tumesteda and since the 12th century has been called various names such as Tumstead or Tunstead. Twinn is Old English for double, while stede is a place, thus Twinstead can be defined as double homestead.

It was once part of the Hinckford Hundred, a subdivision of the county which had its own court.

In the 1870s, Twinstead was described as:

TWINSTEAD. Acres, 1,008. Real property, £2,179. Houses, 48. T. Hall is the seat of B. Sparrow, Esq. The living is a rectory in the diocese of Rochester. Value, £250.* Patron, the Lord Chancellor.

=== The manor house ===
This belonged to Richard Fitz-Gilbert in 1086 as he was the lord of the area, and then during the reign of Henry the Second was passed to Steven de Beauchamp. After his passing he was succeeded by his son Stephen who then went on to pass it to his three sisters as he bore no children. After many years of changing ownership by 1374 it was passed on to Simon Sudbury, the archbishop of Canterbury. After his murder, many others came into possession of this property, and many additions have been made for example the arms of Issac Wyncoll appears in one of the windows. This house was previously surrounded by a deep moat, with a light bridge that connected the surrounding gardens and meadows. However, since then the moat has been destroyed but the bridge remains, with some ancient characteristics also remaining, however most parts of the house have been modernised and it is now a hotel.

== Geography ==
Essex, Twinstead

Climate chart (precipitation, max. and min. temperature)
J	F	M	A	M	J	J	A	S	O	N	D
105 7 3	39 7 2	80 9 3	71 12 4	50 18 10	123 20 13	45 22 15	51 22 15	46 21 14	28 14 9	82 9 4	21 9 4
- █ Average max. and min. temperatures in °C
- █ Precipitation totals in mm
Imperial conversion
J	F	M	A	M	J	J	A	S	O	N	D
4.1 45 37	1.5 45 36	3.2 48 37	2.8 54 39	2 64 50	4.8 68 55	1.8 72 59	2 72 59	1.8 70 57	1.1 57 48	3.2 48 39	0.8 48 39
- █ Average max. and min. temperatures in °F
- █ Precipitation totals in inches

In the past the parish occupied a healthy area of the county which was very pleasant, with good soil, on a clay bottom on which crops could be cultivated hence agriculture thrived.

Twinstead is 49.2 miles NE of London and is near the town of Sudbury, 3 miles south. It is elevated at 81 meters in height which is equal to 226 feet. The A131 road is the only large road that passes through Twinstead; the two closest railway stations are Bures and Sudbury. The average climate in Twinstead is a maritime climate with highs of 22 °C and lows of 2 °C.

== Demographics ==
Before the 1800s the total population had 25 households according to the Domesday Book, which was quite large in comparison to other settlements. However nearby settlements shared the pattern of a large settlement, with Pebmarsh having 25 households and Lamarsh having 31. However, Twinstead in comparison paid o.6 geld units of tax per property which was very small in comparison to other areas.

=== Population post 1800s ===
Over the years the population has fluctuated, starting off at 181 people in 1801 when first recorded in the census, this dropped significantly in 1811 to 139 people. However, by 1821 this had risen back to a high of 202 people. This stayed stable until 1901 when we see another dip to a 145 people.

In the years after we see a steady incline then decline, so the population of the civil parish including Pebmarsh at the 2011 Census was 155.

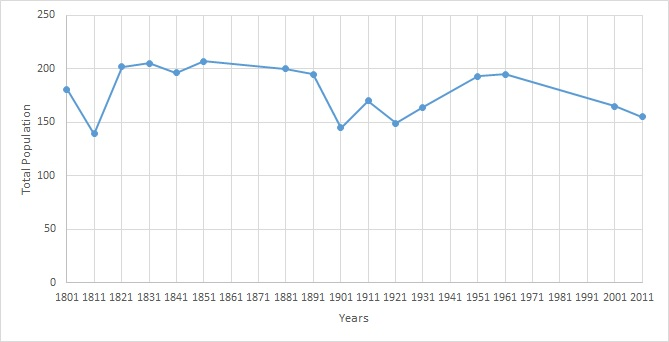
Population of Twinstead 1801-2011

According to the 2011 Census there were 79 males and 76 females living in the parish, whereas in 1801 there were 96 males and 85 females. Not only has the population reduced but the gap between the number of females and males has reduced too.

=== Ethnicity ===
This has been predominately if not entirely a white Christian dominated area due to it being heavily influenced by the church in the past. In modern times the statistics have not changed and it is an area that is less ethnically diverse than the UK's average. From the 2001 Census there were 157 recorded people of White-British origin and 4 of mixed (White and Black African) origin. In the most recent 2011 Census there were 150 recorded people of White-British origin, 4 of other white origin and 1 person of Arab origin. The ethnic minorities in this area have only changed slightly but is still predominantly white.

== Industry and social structure ==
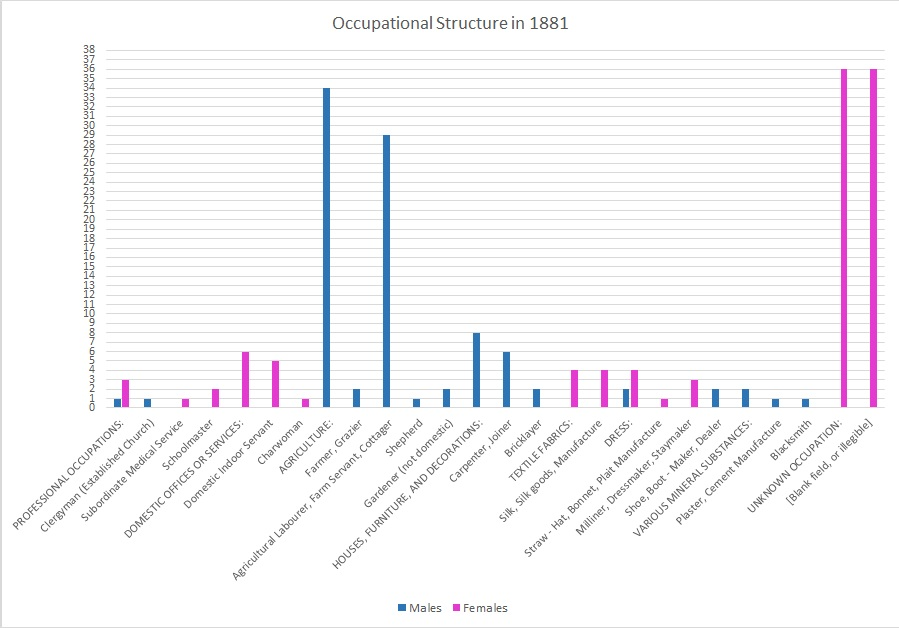
Occupational Structure of Twinstead (1881)

In the early 1800s the social structure was based on three categories: The Employers and Professionals, The Middling Sorts and The Labourers and Servants.

By the late 1800s the population was more precisely divided due to their jobs in different industries. The chart showing the occupational structures of Twinstead illustrates that males dominated in agriculture with 34 people, especially as labourers, whereas woman dominated in domestic services with only 6 people. However, the difference between the beginning and end of this century is that a more diverse range of jobs became available.

By the 21st century, the occupational structure had changed in Twinstead, like many places in the UK by 2011 many primary sector jobs were gone. Many jobs consisted of managers and directors with 19 people, 12 and 14 people in professional and technical occupations, 5 in the administrative sector and 14 in skilled trades occupations. Other jobs included people in caring leisure and other services, sales and customer service, process plant and machine operatives and finally elementary occupations.

== Sport ==
The 2 main sports in this area are riding and cricket. Since 1956, Twinstead Riding School has offered riding tuition for everyone and having 40 horses and 135 acres of land helps them accommodate all ages and abilities. Twinstead Cricket Club, also known as Twinstead CC, are a group of cricket enthusiasts who have an active social calendar with year-round events.
