= Great Henny =

Village in Essex, England

Coordinates: 52.007°N 0.719°E

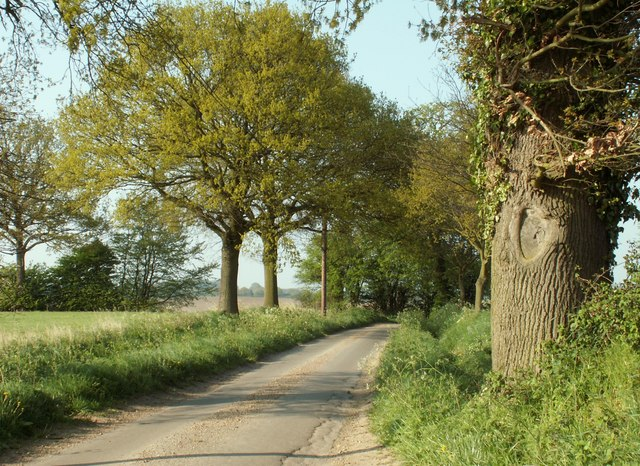
- Great Henny

- Location within Essex
- Population: 141 (Parish, 2021)
- District: Braintree
- Shire county: Essex
- Region: East
- Country: England
- Sovereign state: United Kingdom
- Post town: SUDBURY
- Postcode district: CO10
- Dialling code: 01787
- Police: Essex
- Fire: Essex
- Ambulance: East of England

Great Henny is a village and civil parish in the Braintree district in the county of Essex, England. Nearby settlements include the villages of Little Henny and Twinstead and the Suffolk market town of Sudbury. The hamlet of Henny Street, within the parish, is on the River Stour which forms the parish's eastern border. At the 2021 census the parish had a population of 141.

Great Henny shares a grouped parish council with the neighbouring parishes of Little Henny, Middleton, and Twinstead, called The Hennys, Middleton and Twinstead Parish Council.

== Location ==
In 1870 the parish was described as "on the river Stour and the Sudbury railway, at the boundary with Suffolk, 2 miles S of Sudbury r. station. Post town, Sudbury." Great Henny is approximately 11 miles (18 km) north-west of Colchester and 11 miles north-east of Braintree.

== St Mary's Church ==
St Mary's Church is the only church within the parish, and is the Church of St Mary the Virgin. The church is thought to have first been built in the 11th or 12th century and then later extended in the 14th century. The church is also registered as a Small Place of Pilgrimage. It is a Grade II* listed building.

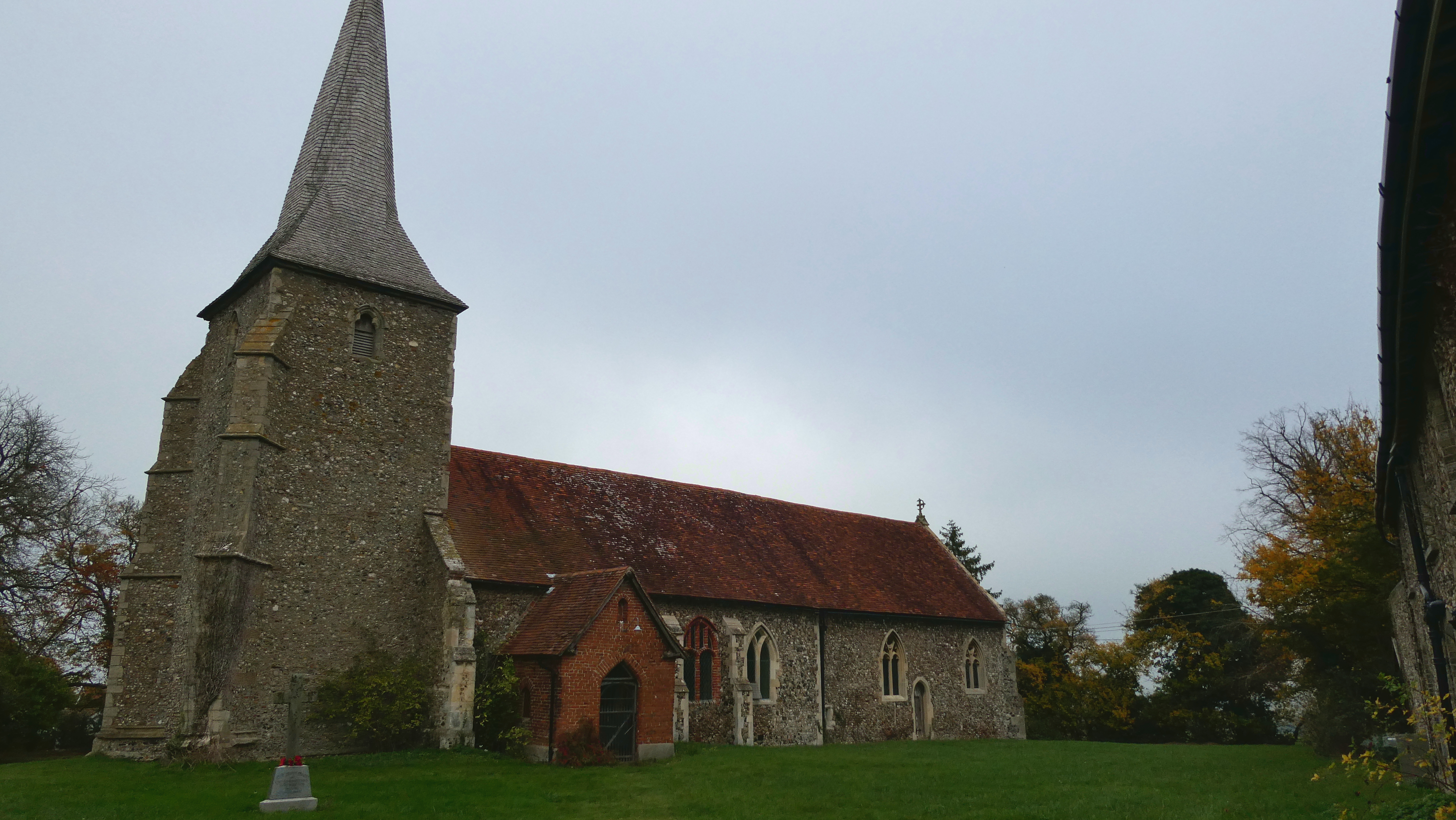
Great Henny parish church St. Mary the Virgin

== Housing ==
In the parish of Great Henny, information has showed that there has always been a small amount of housing in the area, with the highest number of houses between 1831 and 1961, according to census information, being 88 in 1851. This number had slowly increased from 1831 however after 1851, the number of houses within the area began to slowly decrease and the census information in 1961 showed that in total there were 58 total houses in the area. This number had increased again, to 72 by the latest census which was taken in 2011.

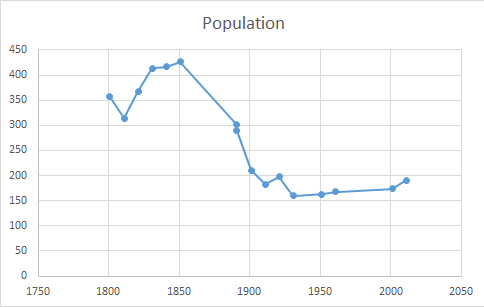
Population of Great Henny, Essex, Civil Parish as reported by the census of population from 1801 to 1961.

== Population ==
According to the 2011 census, the population of Great Henny in that year was 191 people. Census data tells us that the population of Great Henny has not fluctuated majorly over the past 200 years since 1811, when census data is available for Great Henny. Over each ten-year period when the census was taken between 1811 and 1951, the population decreased every year except from the year 1951 when the population increased by 3. During every other census, however, the population was seen to decrease, with the largest decline being in 1901, when the population had decreased by 78 from the previous census. The total number of houses within the area can be seen to have decreased within the period of 1831–1961, when this data is available. In 1861, the total number of houses was 83, and while this remained steady and actually increased to 88 in 1881, the total number of households was seen to decrease every ten years when the census was taken and in 1961 there were only 58 houses in the area. This number, however, is an increase upon the lowest number of 43 houses which was in 1931. The decrease in the number of houses could be linked to the decreasing population during these times.

== Employment ==
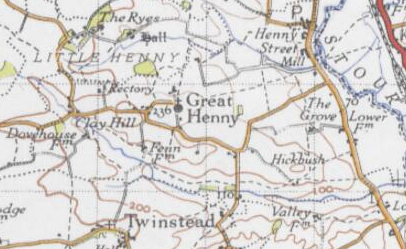
Historical map of Great Henny

In 1831, the majority of males over the age of 20 (73% of employed males) were agricultural labourers. The next leading occupation, although only at approximately 6%, was males employed in retail and handicrafts. Still in 1881, the majority of workers worked in agriculture, followed by general or unspecified commodities. At this time however, there are also records of females being employed although records show that the majority of females worked in an "unknown occupation." Many females also worked in dress or domestic services or offices. According to the 2011 census, however, only 5 people were working in the agriculture, forestry and fishing industries. The three most popular employment categories were: professional, scientific and technical activities employing a total of 20 people, construction employing a total of 14 people followed by manufacturing providing employment for 11 people. This shows how the area and industry within the area has developed over the past 200 years.

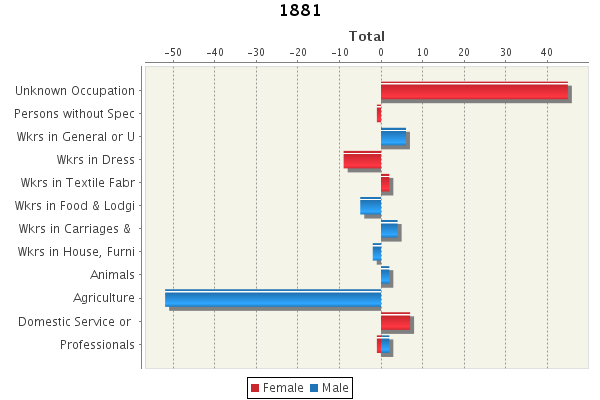
Graph showing occupational data of the population of Great Henny, Essex, in 1881.

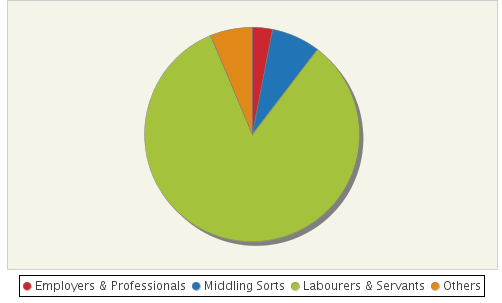
Graph showing social status in the parish of Great Henny in the year 1831 based on occupation.

== Notable people ==
=== Alice Perrers ===
(Main article: Alice Perrers)

Alice Perrers, (circa 1348 –1400/1401) was an English royal mistress, lover of Edward III, King of England. Some sources attribute her as the daughter of a thatcher from Henny, while others place her from several alternative locations. As no birth record of Alice Perrers remains, many unfounded theories have arisen about her parentage. The earliest tradition spoke of a lowly birth, either as a niece of William of Wykeham (1320/1324–1404), Bishop of Winchester and Lord Chancellor, or as the daughter of a weaver from Devon. According to contemporary chronicler Thomas Walsingham, she was "from the town of Henny" and "of low birth" as the daughter of a thatcher. Walsingham's account is often questioned because of his open hostility against the royal court and especially Perrers. Other evidence suggests that her birth surname was Salisbury

She became the mistress of the king, Edward III (1312–1377) around 1366, when she was around 18 years old and the king 55. As a result of the king's patronage, she became the wealthiest and most influential woman in the country. She was widely despised and accused of taking advantage of the old king.

At that same time there was a woman in England called Alice Perrers. She was a shameless, impudent harlot, and of low birth, for she was the daughter of a thatcher from the town of Henny, elevated by fortune. She was not attractive or beautiful, but knew how to compensate for these defects with the seductiveness of her voice. Blind fortune elevated this woman to such heights and promoted her to a greater intimacy with the king than was proper, since she had been the maidservant and mistress of a man of Lombardy. And while the queen was still alive, the king loved this woman more than he loved the queen.

— Thomas Walsingham, The St Albans Chronicle

Perrers died during the winter of 1400/1401, aged around 52, and was buried in the Church of St Laurence in Upminster.
