= Belchamp St Paul =

Village in Essex, England

Coordinates: 52.0503°N 0.6118°E

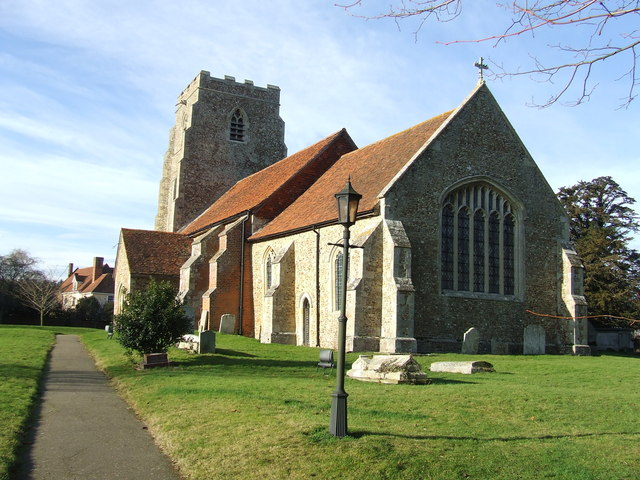
- St Andrew's Church, Belchamp St Paul

- Location within Essex
- Population: 371 (Parish, 2021)
- OS grid reference: TL791423
- Civil parish: Belchamp St Paul
- District: Braintree
- Shire county: Essex
- Region: East
- Country: England
- Sovereign state: United Kingdom
- Post town: SUDBURY
- Postcode district: CO10
- Police: Essex
- Fire: Essex
- Ambulance: East of England
- UK Parliament: Braintree

Belchamp St Paul is a village and civil parish in the Braintree district of Essex, England.

The village is 5 miles (8 km) west of Sudbury, Suffolk, and 23 miles (37 km) northeast of the county town, Chelmsford.

The parish is northwest of Belchamp Otten and Belchamp Walter, in the parliamentary constituency of Braintree, and part of the Stour Valley. The parish includes the hamlet of Knowl Green. At the 2021 census the parish had a population of 371.

Arthur Golding, the 16th-century poet, grew up at the manor and is buried in the churchyard of St Andrew's; a memorial to him is within the church. General Sir Timothy Creasey KCB OBE, a British Army officer who became General Officer Commanding of the British Army in Northern Ireland, and the commander of the Sultan of Oman's Armed Forces, is buried in the churchyard.

The church has a ring of 6 bells.

The Half Moon public house was the location for a number of pub scenes in the BBC drama series Lovejoy.

Belchamp St Paul is the scene of the climax of M.R. James' ghost story Count Magnus.
