= Belchamp Otten =

Village in Essex, England

Coordinates: 52.0446°N 0.6260°E

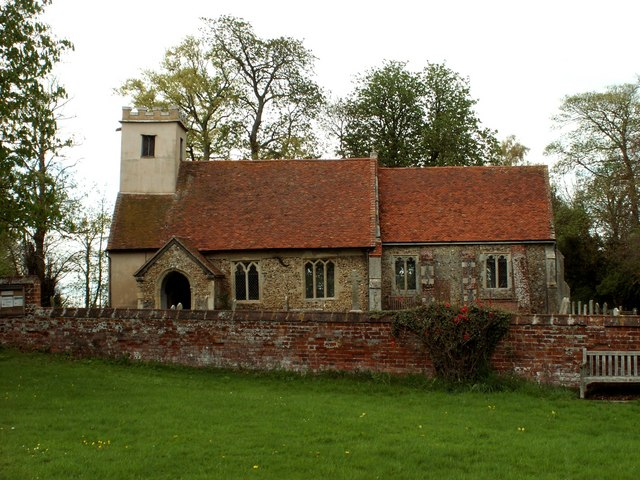
- St Ethelbert and All Saints' Church, Belchamp Otten

- Location within Essex
- Population: 168 (Parish, 2021)
- OS grid reference: TL801417
- Civil parish: Belchamp Otten
- District: Braintree district
- Shire county: Essex
- Region: East
- Country: England
- Sovereign state: United Kingdom
- Post town: SUDBURY
- Postcode district: CO10
- Police: Essex
- Fire: Essex
- Ambulance: East of England
- UK Parliament: Braintree

Belchamp Otten is a village and civil parish in Essex, England. It is located approximately 4.3 miles (7 km) west of Sudbury, Suffolk, and is 23 miles (37 km) north-northeast of the county town of Chelmsford. It is near Belchamp St Paul and Belchamp Walter. The village is in the district of Braintree and in the parliamentary constituency of Braintree. At the 2021 census the parish had a population of 168.
