= Belchamp Walter =

Village in Essex, England

Coordinates: 52.0335°N 0.6504°E

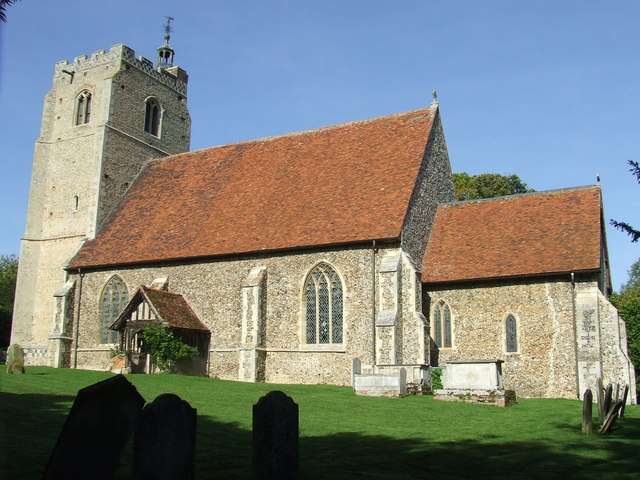
- St. Mary the Virgin, Belchamp Walter

- Location within Essex
- Population: 225 (Parish, 2021)
- OS grid reference: TL819405
- Civil parish: Belchamp Walter
- District: Braintree
- Shire county: Essex
- Region: East
- Country: England
- Sovereign state: United Kingdom
- Post town: SUDBURY
- Postcode district: CO10
- Police: Essex
- Fire: Essex
- Ambulance: East of England
- UK Parliament: Braintree

Belchamp Walter is a village and civil parish in Essex, England. It is located approximately 5 km (3.1 mi) west of Sudbury, Suffolk and is 35 km (22 miles) north-northeast from the county town of Chelmsford. It is near Belchamp St Paul and Belchamp Otten. The village is in the district of Braintree and in the parliamentary constituency of Braintree. At the 2021 census the parish had a population of 225.

Belchamp Hall is a country house in the village which stands near the church. It was the filming location for the fictional "Felsham Hall" in the "Lovejoy" television series.
