= Bulmer, Essex =

Village and civil parish in Essex, England

Coordinates: 52.031°N 0.687°E

Bulmer
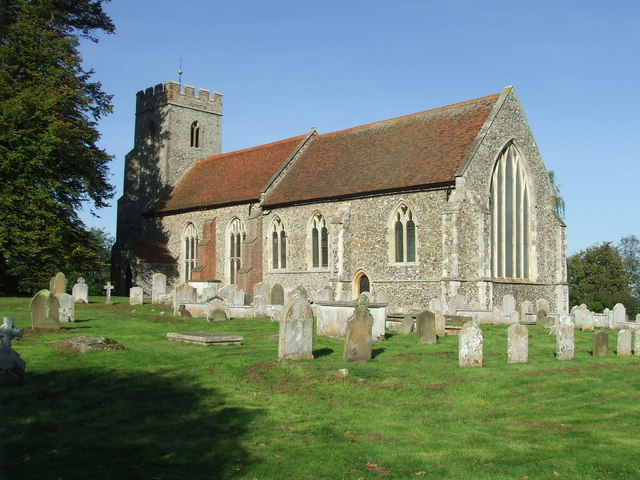
- St Andrew's Church

- Location within Essex
- Population: 645 (Parish, 2021)
- Civil parish: Bulmer
- District: Braintree
- Shire county: Essex
- Region: East
- Country: England
- Sovereign state: United Kingdom
- Post town: SUDBURY
- Postcode district: CO10

Bulmer is a village and civil parish in the Braintree district of Essex, England. The village is about 4 miles (6.4 km) south-west of Sudbury in Suffolk. As well as the village itself, the parish also covers surrounding rural areas, including the settlement of Bulmer Tye to the south of the village. At the 2021 census the parish had a population of 645.

Mr and Mrs Andrews, the subject of one of the most famous works of the painter Thomas Gainsborough, are buried in the churchyard, whilst a memorial to them hangs within the church itself.

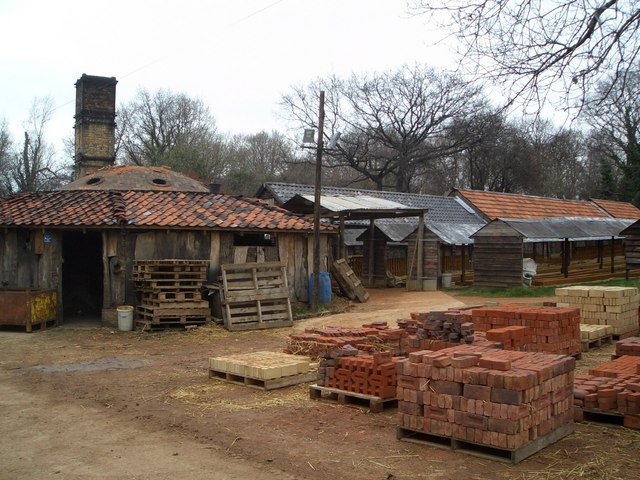
Bulmer Brick and Tile Works

The village is home to Bulmer Brick and Tile Company.
