= List of civil parishes in Essex =

Blank map of civil parish boundaries in Essex

This is a list of civil parishes in the ceremonial county of Essex, England. There are 307 civil parishes.

The former Thurrock Urban District, Benfleet Urban District, Harlow Urban District and Clacton Urban District are unparished. Parts of the former Basildon Urban District, Braintree and Bocking Urban District, Brentwood Urban District, Colchester Municipal Borough, Chelmsford Municipal Borough and Southend-on-Sea County Borough are also unparished. Population figures are not available for some of the smallest parishes.

Civil parish	Civil parish population 2011	Area (hectares) 2011	Pre-1974 district	District
Abberton^{**}	424	318.31		Colchester
Abbess Beauchamp and Berners Roding	481	1600.96	Epping and Ongar Rural District	Epping Forest
Aldham	491	716.65	Lexden and Winstree Rural District	Colchester
Alphamstone	200	691.31	Halstead Rural District	Braintree
Alresford	2,009	680.93	Tendring Rural District	Tendring
Althorne	1,159	853.73	Maldon Rural District	Maldon
Ardleigh	2,058	2040.33	Tendring Rural District	Tendring
Arkesden	366	882.25	Saffron Walden Rural District	Uttlesford
Ashdon	893	1997.27	Saffron Walden Rural District	Uttlesford
Asheldham	142	529.82	Maldon Rural District	Maldon
Ashen	323	607.11	Halstead Rural District	Braintree
Ashingdon	3,634	1016.45	Rochford Rural District	Rochford
Aythorpe Roding	214	590.80	Dunmow Rural District	Uttlesford
Barling Magna	1,740	1393.87	Rochford Rural District	Rochford
Barnston	947	694.05	Dunmow Rural District	Uttlesford
Beaumont-cum-Moze	339	1075.71	Tendring Rural District	Tendring
Belchamp Otten	164	702.05	Halstead Rural District	Braintree
Belchamp St Paul	362	1023.81	Halstead Rural District	Braintree
Belchamp Walter	328	1209.09	Halstead Rural District	Braintree
Berden	465	729.19	Saffron Walden Rural District	Uttlesford
Billericay (town)	27,998	1484.57	Basildon Urban District	Basildon
Birch	873	1361.95	Lexden and Winstree Rural District	Colchester
Birchanger	1,589	414.09	Saffron Walden Rural District	Uttlesford
Birdbrook	397	842.91	Halstead Rural District	Braintree
Black Notley	2,478	753.75	Braintree Rural District	Braintree
Blackmore, Hook End and Wyatts Green	3,040	1041.16	Epping and Ongar Rural District	Brentwood
Bobbingworth	280	1005.20	Epping and Ongar Rural District	Epping Forest
Boreham	3,597	1539.58	Chelmsford Rural District	Chelmsford
Borley			Halstead Rural District	Braintree
Bowers Gifford and North Benfleet	1,936	980.62	Basildon Urban District	Basildon
Boxted	1,379	1285.26	Lexden and Winstree Rural District	Colchester
Bradfield	1,112	865.67	Tendring Rural District	Tendring
Bradwell	509	973.38	Braintree Rural District	Braintree
Bradwell on Sea	863	2141.89	Maldon Rural District	Maldon
Brightlingsea (town)	8,076	1143.20	Brightlingsea Urban District	Tendring
Broomfield	4,575	746.69	Chelmsford Rural District	Chelmsford
Broxted	508	1119.54	Dunmow Rural District	Uttlesford
Buckhurst Hill	11,380	385.21	Chigwell Urban District	Epping Forest
Bulmer	584	1125.79	Halstead Rural District	Braintree
Bures Hamlet	749	746.88	Halstead Rural District	Braintree
Burnham on Crouch (town)	7,671	2164.56	Burnham on Crouch Urban District	Maldon
Canewdon	1,473	2748.89	Rochford Rural District	Rochford
Canvey Island (town)	38,170	1827.88	Canvey Island Urban District	Castle Point
Castle Hedingham	1,201	970.42	Halstead Rural District	Braintree
Chappel	506	466.27	Lexden and Winstree Rural District	Colchester
Chelmer				Chelmsford
Chelmsford Garden				Chelmsford
Chickney			Dunmow Rural District	Uttlesford
Chignall	311	912.29	Chelmsford Rural District	Chelmsford
Chigwell	12,987	1567.76	Chigwell Urban District	Epping Forest
Chrishall	555	993.38	Saffron Walden Rural District	Uttlesford
Clavering	1,238	1547.14	Saffron Walden Rural District	Uttlesford
Coggeshall	4,727	2281.73	Braintree Rural District	Braintree
Cold Norton	1,099	676.90	Maldon Rural District	Maldon
Colne Engaine	1,008	987.79	Halstead Rural District	Braintree
Copford	1,689	869.57	Lexden and Winstree Rural District	Colchester
Cressing	1,649	1051.63	Braintree Rural District	Braintree
Danbury	5,087	1186.33	Chelmsford Rural District	Chelmsford
Debden	778	1643.75	Saffron Walden Rural District	Uttlesford
Dedham	1,907	1043.52	Lexden and Winstree Rural District	Colchester
Dengie	119	1160.85	Maldon Rural District	Maldon
Doddinghurst	2,832	661.33	Epping and Ongar Rural District	Brentwood
Earls Colne	3,693	1196.77	Halstead Rural District	Braintree
East Donyland	1,930	82.72	Lexden and Winstree Rural District	Colchester
East Hanningfield	1,171	1019.02	Chelmsford Rural District	Chelmsford
East Mersea	266	801.31	Lexden and Winstree Rural District	Colchester
Eight Ash Green	1,730	651.42	Lexden and Winstree Rural District	Colchester
Elmdon	610	1689.96	Saffron Walden Rural District	Uttlesford
Elmstead	1,855	1459.04	Tendring Rural District	Tendring
Elsenham	2,446	862.22	Saffron Walden Rural District	Uttlesford
Epping Upland	831	1773.78	Epping and Ongar Rural District	Epping Forest
Epping (town)	11,461	773.07	Epping Urban District	Epping Forest
Fairstead	290	1185.42	Braintree Rural District	Braintree
Farnham	410	859.59	Saffron Walden Rural District	Uttlesford
Faulkbourne			Braintree Rural District	Braintree
Feering	2,035	1069.86	Braintree Rural District	Braintree
Felsted	3,051	2404.10	Dunmow Rural District	Uttlesford
Finchingfield	1,471	3351.65	Braintree Rural District	Braintree
Fingringhoe	775	1019.82	Lexden and Winstree Rural District	Colchester
Flitch Green	2,190	215.94	Dunmow Rural District	Uttlesford
Fordham	835	763.70	Lexden and Winstree Rural District	Colchester
Foulness	151	2930.26	Rochford Rural District	Rochford
Foxearth	296	950.63	Halstead Rural District	Braintree
Frating	537	479.54	Tendring Rural District	Tendring
Frinton and Walton (town)	18,845	2493.47	Frinton and Walton Urban District	Tendring
Fyfield	796	991.56	Epping and Ongar Rural District	Epping Forest
Galleywood	5,738	894.87	Chelmsford Rural District	Chelmsford
Gestingthorpe	421	995.72	Halstead Rural District	Braintree
Goldhanger	654	653.01	Maldon Rural District	Maldon
Good Easter	382	794.93	Chelmsford Rural District	Chelmsford
Gosfield	1,362	1282.00	Halstead Rural District	Braintree
Great and Little Leighs	2,709	1689.25	Chelmsford Rural District	Chelmsford
Great and Little Wigborough^{*}	246	1345.40		Colchester
Great Baddow	14,650	648.28	Chelmsford Rural District	Chelmsford
Great Bardfield	1,227	1411.38	Braintree Rural District	Braintree
Great Bentley	2,253	1307.85	Tendring Rural District	Tendring
Great Braxted	330	1066.80	Maldon Rural District	Maldon
Great Bromley	1,037	1212.53	Tendring Rural District	Tendring
Great Burstead and South Green (village)	5,968	742.00	Basildon Urban District	Basildon
Great Canfield	414	1023.18	Dunmow Rural District	Uttlesford
Great Chesterford	1,494	1146.12	Saffron Walden Rural District	Uttlesford
Great Dunmow (town)	8,830	2332.22	Dunmow Rural District	Uttlesford
Great Easton	1,035	1517.59	Dunmow Rural District	Uttlesford
Great Hallingbury	713	1032.62	Dunmow Rural District	Uttlesford
Great Henny***	191	587.42	Halstead Rural District	Braintree
Great Horkesley	2,476	1192.33	Lexden and Winstree Rural District	Colchester
Great Maplestead	343	736.65	Halstead Rural District	Braintree
Great Notley	6,496	262.80	Braintree Rural District	Braintree
Great Oakley	1,017	1342.25	Tendring Rural District	Tendring
Great Sampford	586	702.58	Saffron Walden Rural District	Uttlesford
Great Tey	911	1133.61	Lexden and Winstree Rural District	Colchester
Great Totham	2,930	1453.00	Maldon Rural District	Maldon
Great Wakering	5,587	1022.98	Rochford Rural District	Rochford
Great Waltham	2,172	2503.81	Chelmsford Rural District	Chelmsford
Great Yeldham	1,844	779.75	Halstead Rural District	Braintree
Greenstead Green and Halstead Rural	670	1770.91	Halstead Rural District	Braintree
Hadstock	332	685.54	Saffron Walden Rural District	Uttlesford
Halstead (town)	11,906	507.66	Halstead Urban District	Braintree
Harwich (town)	17,684	642.34	Harwich Municipal Borough	Tendring
Hatfield Broad Oak	1,276	2425.16	Dunmow Rural District	Uttlesford
Hatfield Heath	1,930	1086.83	Dunmow Rural District	Uttlesford
Hatfield Peverel	4,376	1910.22	Braintree Rural District	Braintree
Hawkwell	11,730	549.79	Rochford Rural District	Rochford
Hazeleigh			Maldon Rural District	Maldon
Helions Bumpstead	439	1151.67	Halstead Rural District	Braintree
Hempstead	451	1461.78	Saffron Walden Rural District	Uttlesford
Henham	1,233	1449.67	Saffron Walden Rural District	Uttlesford
Herongate and Ingrave	2,175	1219.85	Brentwood Urban District	Brentwood
Heybridge Basin	14,220	1228.81	Maldon Municipal Borough	Maldon
Heybridge	8,175	682.90	Maldon Municipal Borough	Maldon
High Easter	754	2095.93	Dunmow Rural District	Uttlesford
High Laver	493	1159.13	Epping and Ongar Rural District	Epping Forest
High Ongar	1,255	1585.07	Epping and Ongar Rural District	Epping Forest
High Roding	478	795.72	Dunmow Rural District	Uttlesford
Highwood	654	1410.07	Chelmsford Rural District	Chelmsford
Hockley	9,616	696.76	Rochford Rural District	Rochford
Hullbridge	6,527	783.78	Rochford Rural District	Rochford
Ingatestone and Fryerning	4,783	1584.60	Chelmsford Rural District	Brentwood
Kelvedon Hatch	2,541	765.34	Epping and Ongar Rural District	Brentwood
Kelvedon	3,587	1297.62	Braintree Rural District	Braintree
Lamarsh	187	379.26	Halstead Rural District	Braintree
Lambourne	2,013	1041.69	Epping and Ongar Rural District	Epping Forest
Langenhoe^{**}	572	811.88		Colchester
Langford	161	400.71	Maldon Rural District	Maldon
Langham	1,036	1205.26	Lexden and Winstree Rural District	Colchester
Langley	355	736.31	Saffron Walden Rural District	Uttlesford
Latchingdon	1,241	1467.69	Maldon Rural District	Maldon
Lawford	4,302	1100.92	Tendring Rural District	Tendring
Layer Breton	287	510.07	Lexden and Winstree Rural District	Colchester
Layer de la Haye	1,767	826.15	Lexden and Winstree Rural District	Colchester
Layer Marney	199	896.48	Lexden and Winstree Rural District	Colchester
Leaden Roding	616	420.70	Dunmow Rural District	Uttlesford
Leigh-on-Sea (town)	22,509	523.37	Southend on Sea County Borough	Southend-on-Sea
Lindsell	260	802.75	Dunmow Rural District	Uttlesford
Liston			Halstead Rural District	Braintree
Little Baddow	1,586	1115.87	Chelmsford Rural District	Chelmsford
Little Bardfield	264	867.81	Dunmow Rural District	Uttlesford
Little Bentley	271	847.92	Tendring Rural District	Tendring
Little Braxted	170	251.80	Maldon Rural District	Maldon
Little Bromley	253	747.18	Tendring Rural District	Tendring
Little Burstead	395	759.54	Basildon Urban District	Basildon
Little Canfield	935	690.88	Dunmow Rural District	Uttlesford
Little Chesterford	215	616.66	Saffron Walden Rural District	Uttlesford
Little Clacton	2,822	901.72	Tendring Rural District	Tendring
Little Dunmow	284	483.58	Dunmow Rural District	Uttlesford
Little Easton	437	718.98	Dunmow Rural District	Uttlesford
Little Hallingbury	1,582	731.66	Dunmow Rural District	Uttlesford
Little Henny***			Halstead Rural District	Braintree
Little Horkesley	188	517.29	Lexden and Winstree Rural District	Colchester
Little Laver			Epping and Ongar Rural District	Epping Forest
Little Maplestead	270	592.53	Halstead Rural District	Braintree
Little Oakley	1,171	488.00	Tendring Rural District	Tendring
Little Sampford	251	1343.42	Saffron Walden Rural District	Uttlesford
Little Totham	400	518.93	Maldon Rural District	Maldon
Little Waltham	1,316	1206.28	Chelmsford Rural District	Chelmsford
Little Yeldham	331	517.06	Halstead Rural District	Braintree
Littlebury	869	1647.52	Saffron Walden Rural District	Uttlesford
Loughton (town)	31,106	1512.13	Chigwell Urban District	Epping Forest
Magdalen Laver	232	606.44	Epping and Ongar Rural District	Epping Forest
Maldon (town)			Maldon Municipal Borough	Maldon
Manningtree (town)	911	20.09	Tendring Rural District	Tendring
Manuden	677	1015.41	Saffron Walden Rural District	Uttlesford
Margaret Roding	218	519.20	Dunmow Rural District	Uttlesford
Margaretting	847	1126.36	Chelmsford Rural District	Chelmsford
Marks Tey	2,551	609.68	Lexden and Winstree Rural District	Colchester
Mashbury			Chelmsford Rural District	Chelmsford
Matching	661	1261.84	Epping and Ongar Rural District	Epping Forest
Mayland	3,855	801.34	Maldon Rural District	Maldon
Messing-cum-Inworth	363	994.06	Lexden and Winstree Rural District	Colchester
Middleton***	128	386.04	Halstead Rural District	Braintree
Mistley	2,685	857.14	Tendring Rural District	Tendring
Moreton	321	596.29	Epping and Ongar Rural District	Epping Forest
Mount Bures	249	523.41	Lexden and Winstree Rural District	Colchester
Mountnessing	1,183	1210.40	Chelmsford Rural District	Brentwood
Mundon	355	1325.86	Maldon Rural District	Maldon
Myland	11,299	667.84	Colchester Municipal Borough	Colchester
Navestock	585	1829.53	Epping and Ongar Rural District	Brentwood
Nazeing	4,378	1644.12	Epping and Ongar Rural District	Epping Forest
Newport	2,352	876.89	Saffron Walden Rural District	Uttlesford
Noak Bridge	2,763	270.65	Basildon Urban District	Basildon
North Fambridge	835	500.10	Maldon Rural District	Maldon
North Weald Bassett	6,032	2278.61	Epping and Ongar Rural District	Epping Forest
Ongar (town)	6,251	901.80	Epping and Ongar Rural District	Epping Forest
Ovington			Halstead Rural District	Braintree
Paglesham	246	760.82	Rochford Rural District	Rochford
Panfield	841	607.24	Braintree Rural District	Braintree
Pebmarsh	570	835.72	Halstead Rural District	Braintree
Peldon^{*}	559	1023.15		Colchester
Pentlow	227	767.81	Halstead Rural District	Braintree
Pleshey	373	879.92	Chelmsford Rural District	Chelmsford
Purleigh	1,271	2240.57	Maldon Rural District	Maldon
Quendon and Rickling	587	829.53	Saffron Walden Rural District	Uttlesford
Radwinter	612	1527.99	Saffron Walden Rural District	Uttlesford
Ramsden Bellhouse	788	231.33	Basildon Urban District	Basildon
Ramsden Crays	1,838	517.34	Basildon Urban District	Basildon
Ramsey and Parkeston	2,343	1599.05	Tendring Rural District	Tendring
Rawreth	1,126	1112.86	Rayleigh Urban District	Rochford
Rayleigh (town)	32,150	1197.98	Rayleigh Urban District	Rochford
Rayne	2,299	846.56	Braintree Rural District	Braintree
Rettendon	1,627	1735.53	Chelmsford Rural District	Chelmsford
Ridgewell	509	605.95	Halstead Rural District	Braintree
Rivenhall	742	951.07	Witham Urban District	Braintree
Rochford	8,471	1222.23	Rochford Rural District	Rochford
Roxwell	1,044	1934.92	Chelmsford Rural District	Chelmsford
Roydon	2,828	1094.34	Epping and Ongar Rural District	Epping Forest
Runwell	3,394	583.50	Chelmsford Rural District	Chelmsford
Saffron Walden (town)	15,504	2488.85	Saffron Walden Municipal Borough	Uttlesford
Salcott^{*}	317	249.88		Colchester
Sandon	1,612	1053.07	Chelmsford Rural District	Chelmsford
Sewards End	511	490.47	Saffron Walden Municipal Borough	Uttlesford
Shalford	747	999.25	Braintree Rural District	Braintree
Sheering	2,905	837.62	Epping and Ongar Rural District	Epping Forest
Shotgate	3,699	125.49	Basildon Urban District	Basildon
Sible Hedingham	3,994	2178.17	Halstead Rural District	Braintree
Silver End	3,861	504.74	Witham Urban District	Braintree
South Hanningfield	2,629	1422.43	Chelmsford Rural District	Chelmsford
South Woodham Ferrers (town)	16,453	852.50	Chelmsford Rural District	Chelmsford
Southminster (town)	4,272	2637.86	Maldon Rural District	Maldon
Springfield	20,084	817.62	Chelmsford Rural District	Chelmsford
St Lawrence	1,388	924.23	Maldon Rural District	Maldon
St Osyth	4,277	3221.10	Tendring Rural District	Tendring
Stambourne	409	892.42	Halstead Rural District	Braintree
Stambridge	700	890.90	Rochford Rural District	Rochford
Stanford Rivers	817	1748.51	Epping and Ongar Rural District	Epping Forest
Stansted Mountfitchet	6,011	1619.40	Saffron Walden Rural District	Uttlesford
Stanway	8,509	1142.39	Lexden and Winstree Rural District	Colchester
Stapleford Abbotts	1,008	956.90	Epping and Ongar Rural District	Epping Forest
Stapleford Tawney	135	669.69	Epping and Ongar Rural District	Epping Forest
Stebbing	1,300	1770.71	Dunmow Rural District	Uttlesford
Steeple Bumpstead	1,627	1521.40	Halstead Rural District	Braintree
Steeple	490	1035.11	Maldon Rural District	Maldon
Stisted	662	1239.22	Braintree Rural District	Braintree
Stock	2,100	1788.21	Chelmsford Rural District	Chelmsford
Stondon Massey	767	485.95	Epping and Ongar Rural District	Brentwood
Stow Maries	214	661.57	Maldon Rural District	Maldon
Strethall			Saffron Walden Rural District	Uttlesford
Sturmer	492	397.93	Halstead Rural District	Braintree
Sutton	136	622.27	Rochford Rural District	Rochford
Takeley	3,367	1311.43	Dunmow Rural District	Uttlesford
Tendring	736	1163.08	Tendring Rural District	Tendring
Terling	764	1331.26	Braintree Rural District	Braintree
Thaxted	2,845	2537.21	Dunmow Rural District	Uttlesford
The Salings	475	1,132.21	Braintree Rural District	Braintree
Theydon Bois	4,062	831.66	Epping and Ongar Rural District	Epping Forest
Theydon Garnon	121	804.20	Epping and Ongar Rural District	Epping Forest
Theydon Mount	175	632.00	Epping and Ongar Rural District	Epping Forest
Thorpe-le-Soken	1,961	2130.26	Tendring Rural District	Tendring
Thorrington	1,258	832.83	Tendring Rural District	Tendring
Tilbury juxta Clare	205	671.32	Halstead Rural District	Braintree
Tillingham	1,058	2015.64	Maldon Rural District	Maldon
Tilty			Dunmow Rural District	Uttlesford
Tiptree	9,182	957.70	Lexden and Winstree Rural District	Colchester
Tollesbury	2,621	1931.09	Maldon Rural District	Maldon
Tolleshunt D'Arcy	1,042	1639.10	Maldon Rural District	Maldon
Tolleshunt Knights	1,030	800.16	Maldon Rural District	Maldon
Tolleshunt Major	695	913.11	Maldon Rural District	Maldon
Toppesfield	507	1345.20	Halstead Rural District	Braintree
Twinstead***	155	467.18	Halstead Rural District	Braintree
Ugley	449	866.37	Saffron Walden Rural District	Uttlesford
Ulting	167	418.52	Maldon Rural District	Maldon
Virley^{*}				Colchester
Wakes Colne	538	832.76	Lexden and Winstree Rural District	Colchester
Waltham Abbey (town)	21,149	4240.60	Waltham Holy Cross Urban District	Epping Forest
Weeley	1,768	803.19	Tendring Rural District	Tendring
Wenden Lofts			Saffron Walden Rural District	Uttlesford
Wendens Ambo	473	627.70	Saffron Walden Rural District	Uttlesford
West Bergholt	3,344	1034.42	Lexden and Winstree Rural District	Colchester
West Hanningfield	975	1125.70	Chelmsford Rural District	Chelmsford
West Horndon	1,537	765.05	Brentwood Urban District	Brentwood
West Mersea (town)	7,183	1061.37	West Mersea Urban District	Colchester
Wethersfield	1,269	1709.29	Braintree Rural District	Braintree
White Colne	540	608.84	Halstead Rural District	Braintree
White Notley	522	754.82	Braintree Rural District	Braintree
White Roding	327	975.05	Dunmow Rural District	Uttlesford
Wicken Bonhunt	223	343.74	Saffron Walden Rural District	Uttlesford
Wickford			Basildon Urban District	Basildon
Wickham Bishops	1,829	759.48	Maldon Rural District	Maldon
Wickham St Paul	321	495.65	Halstead Rural District	Braintree
Widdington	504	869.30	Saffron Walden Rural District	Uttlesford
Willingale	501	1398.38	Epping and Ongar Rural District	Epping Forest
Wimbish	1,629	1990.55	Saffron Walden Rural District	Uttlesford
Witham (town)	25,353	1400.43	Witham Urban District	Braintree
Wivenhoe (town)	7,637	484.27	Wivenhoe Urban District	Colchester
Wix	720	1265.85	Tendring Rural District	Tendring
Woodham Ferrers and Bicknacre	2,889	1205.78	Chelmsford Rural District	Chelmsford
Woodham Mortimer	641	962.30	Maldon Rural District	Maldon
Woodham Walter	532	1059.32	Maldon Rural District	Maldon
Wormingford	454	925.30	Lexden and Winstree Rural District	Colchester
Wrabness	401	445.86	Tendring Rural District	Tendring
Writtle	5,383	1806.45	Chelmsford Rural District	Chelmsford

^{*}Salcott, Virley, Peldon, Great and Little Wigborough are governed by the joint Winstred Hundred Parish Council.

^{**}Abberton and Langenhoe are governed by the joint Abberton and Langenhoe Parish Council.

^{***}Little Henny, Great Henny, Middleton and Twinsted are governed by the joint Hennys', Middleton & Twinstead Parish Council.

The three parishes of Heydon, Great Chishill and Little Chishill were formerly in Essex, they were transferred to Cambridgeshire in boundary changes in 1895.

== See also ==
- List of civil parishes in England
- The Hundred Parishes - a grouping of parishes in NW Essex, NE Herts and southern Cambridgeshire
