= Dunmow Rural District =

Former rural district in Essex, England

Coordinates: 51.866°N 0.371°E

Dunmow
- Rural district
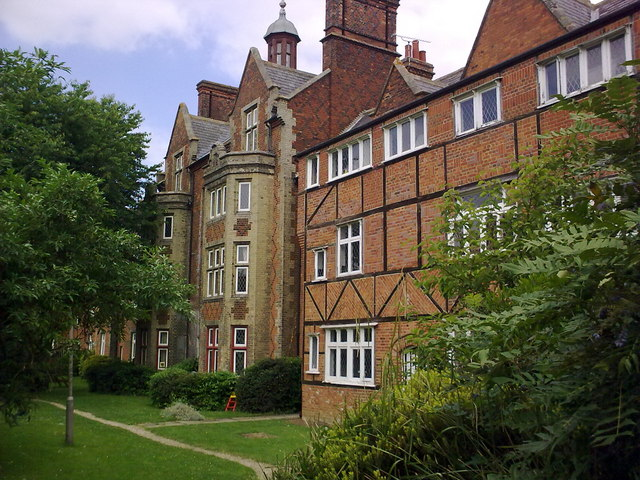
- Former Dunmow Union Workhouse, Chelmsford Road, Great Dunmow
- Area
  - 1971: 29,463 hectares (72,805 acres)
- Population
  - 1901: 15,705
  - 1971: 23,674
- History
  - Created: 28 December 1894
  - Abolished: 31 March 1974
  - Succeeded by: Uttlesford
- Status: Rural district
  - HQ: Great Dunmow

Dunmow Rural District was a rural district in Essex, England, from 1894 to 1974, covering Great Dunmow and surrounding parishes. It was abolished in 1974 to become part of the new Uttlesford district.

== History ==
The district had its origins in the Dunmow Poor Law Union, which had been created in 1835 for a group of parishes to collectively deliver their responsibilities under the poor laws. A workhouse to serve the union was completed in 1840 on Chelmsford Road in Great Dunmow, designed by George Gilbert Scott.

In 1872, sanitary districts were established. In rural areas, public health and local government responsibilities were given to the existing boards of guardians of poor law unions. Rural sanitary districts were reconstituted as rural districts with their own elected councils with effect from 28 December 1894, under the Local Government Act 1894. The link with the poor law union continued in that all the rural district councillors were thereafter ex officio members of the board of guardians. Dunmow Rural District Council held its first official meeting on 29 December 1894. John Barnabas Frankham, a farmer from Little Canfield who was already the chairman of the board of guardians, was elected as the first chairman of the rural district council. He held the post until his death in 1922.

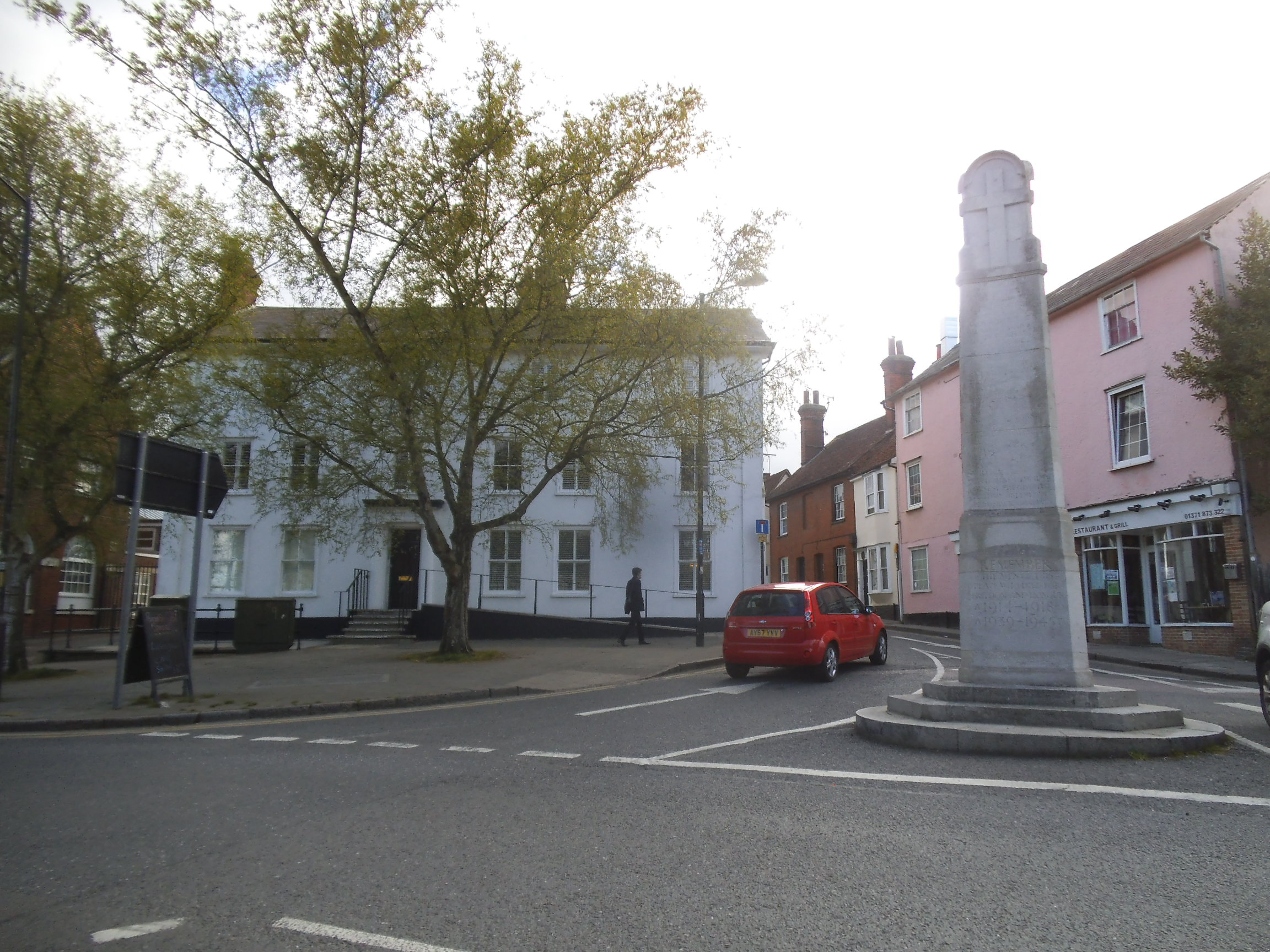
46 High Street (white building behind the tree): Council's headquarters

In its early years, the rural district council met at the workhouse at Great Dunmow. By 1956 the council had established its main offices at a converted early 19th century house at 46 High Street in the centre of Dunmow, remaining there until the council's abolition.

There was a review of boundaries in 1934, which saw Dunmow Rural District cede the parishes of Bardfield Saling and Great Bardfield to Braintree Rural District, but gain the parishes of Great Hallingbury and Little Hallingbury from the disbanded Stansted Rural District.

The rural district was abolished in 1974. The area became part of the new non-metropolitan district of Uttlesford.

== Parishes ==
The civil parishes in Dunmow Rural District were:

- Aythorpe Roding
- Bardfield Saling (until 1934)
- Barnston
- Broxted
- Chickney
- Felsted
- Great Bardfield (until 1934)
- Great Canfield
- Great Dunmow
- Great Easton
- Great Hallingbury (from 1934)
- Hatfield Broad Oak
- High Easter
- High Roding
- Leaden Roding
- Lindsell
- Little Bardfield
- Little Canfield
- Little Dunmow
- Little Easton
- Little Hallingbury (from 1934)
- Margaret Roding
- Stebbing
- Takeley
- Thaxted
- Tilty
- White Roding
