= Little Hallingbury Marsh =

Protected area in Essex, England

Coordinates: 51.833026°N 0.164658°E

- Site of Special Scientific Interest
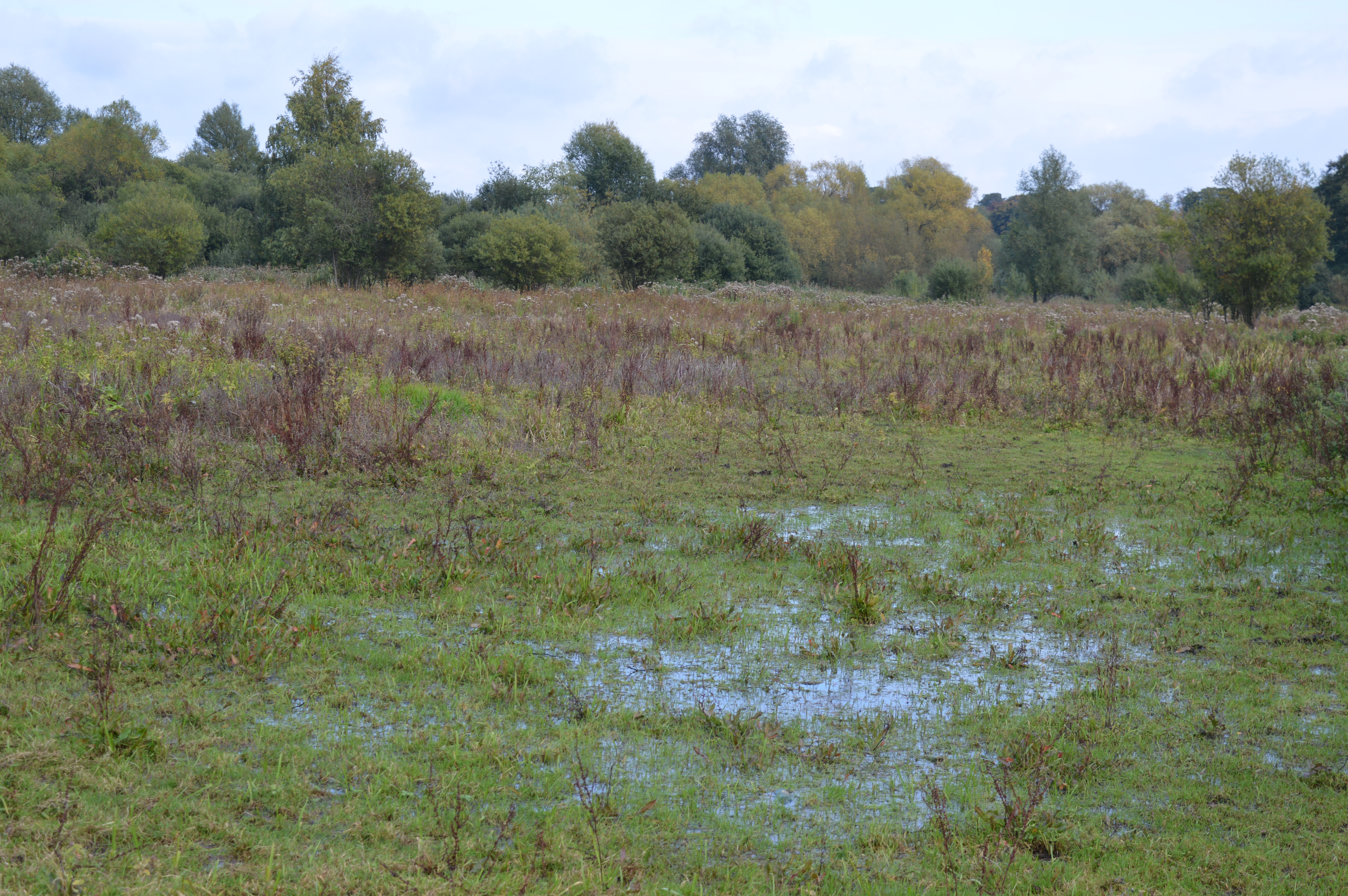
- Location of Little Hallingbury Marsh.
- Area of search: Essex
- Grid reference: TL491171
- Interest: Biological
- Area: 4.5 ha (11 acres)
- Notification date: 1990
- Location map: Magic Map

Little Hallingbury Marsh is a 4.5-hectare (11-acre) biological Site of Special Scientific Interest adjacent to the River Stort, west of Little Hallingbury in Essex. It was notified under Section 28 of the Wildlife and Countryside Act 1981, and the local planning authority is Uttlesford District Council.

The site is unimproved wet grassland and fen, which contains uncommon and declining swamp plant species. The wettest part is dominated by Reed Sweet-grass, and the ditches by branched reed-bur. The site is also of interest for over-wintering birds and aquatic insects, especially dragonflies.

The site is private land with no public access, but it can be viewed from the River Stort towpath.
