= Bumpstead Rural District =

Former local government area in the UK

Coordinates: 52.05°N 0.47°E

Bumpstead
- Area
  - 1901: 11,874 acres (48.05 km^{2})
  - 1911: 11,874 acres (48.05 km^{2})
  - 1931: 11,873 acres (48.05 km^{2})
- Population
  - 1891: 2,886
  - 1901: 2,541
  - 1931: 2,306
- History
  - Created: 1894
  - Abolished: 1934
  - Succeeded by: Halstead Rural District
- Status: Rural district
  - HQ: Kedington

Bumpstead was a rural district in the administrative county of Essex, England from 1894 to 1934.

== Formation ==
The rural district was created by the Local Government Act 1894 from the part of Risbridge Rural Sanitary District that was in Essex (the rest forming the Clare Rural District in West Suffolk). A directly elected rural district council (RDC) replaced the rural sanitary authority, which consisted of the poor law guardians for the area.

The rural district initially covered the following parishes:.

- Ashen
- Birdbrook
- Helion Bumpstead
- Kedington (part only: the remainder of the parish was in Suffolk)
- Ovington
- Steeple Bumpstead
- Sturmer

In 1895 the Essex portion of Kedington was transferred to Clare Rural District, West Suffolk. Meetings of the Bumpstead RDC continued to be held in Kedington, however.

Bumpstead Rural District was abolished in 1934 by a County Review Order and merged into the Halstead Rural District.
