= Stansted Rural District =

Local government area in the UK, abolished 1974

Coordinates: 51.90°N 0.22°E

Stansted was a rural district in Essex, England from 1894 (131 years ago) to 1934 (91 years ago).

It was created under the Local Government Act 1894 from the part of the Bishop's Stortford rural sanitary district which was in Essex (the rest becoming Bishop's Stortford Rural District in Hertfordshire).

It consisted of the following parishes

- Berden
- Birchanger
- Elsenham
- Farnham
- Great Hallingbury
- Henham
- Little Hallingbury
- Manuden
- Stansted Mountfitchet
- Ugley

The district was wound up in 1934 under a County Review Order. The Hallingburys became part of Dunmow Rural District with the rest of the district joining Saffron Walden Rural District. Since 1974 it has formed part of the district of Uttlesford.
