= William Harrison (priest) =

English clergyman, born 1534

William Harrison (18 April 1534 – 24 April 1593) was an English clergyman, whose Description of England was produced as part of the publishing venture of a group of London stationers who produced Raphael Holinshed's Chronicles (1577 and 1587). His contribution to Holinshed's work drew heavily on the earlier work of John Leland.

== Biography ==
=== Early life and education ===
William Harrison was born in London, in the parish of St. Thomas the Apostle, to John and Anne Harrison. As a boy, Harrison attended St Paul's School and the Westminster School of Alexander Nowell. Raised in Protestant circles, Harrison entered Christ Church, Oxford and in 1560 was awarded his bachelor's degree. During the reign of Queen Mary I, Christ Church became a centre of Catholic support, and Harrison converted to Catholicism. Harrison claimed that he returned to Protestant belief before Mary's death in 1558 after hearing the words of Cranmer, Ridley, and Latimer, three Protestant martyrs burned at the stake in Oxford.

=== Adulthood ===
On 15 February 1559, prior to the award of his bachelor's degree at Oxford, Harrison was instituted as the rector of Radwinter in Essex, by the appointment of Lord Cobham, who owned the right, and to whom he was also household chaplain. The living brought with it an income of £40 a year. Despite being well known to posterity for his description of England, at this time he had only travelled within a small compass in the south of England.

Harrison married Marion Isebrand, the daughter of Flemish immigrants. Continuing his theological studies at Cambridge, Harrison took the degree of Bachelor of Divinity in 1571. In the same year he was instituted vicar of Wimbish in Essex. Harrison also held positions at another two London parishes. Near the end of his life, Harrison received an appointment as a canon at St. George's Chapel at Windsor. Harrison was buried at Windsor following his death in 1593.

== Works ==
Harrison is best known for his Description of England, first published in 1577 as part of Holinshed's Chronicles, and reissued in revised form in 1587. This work enumerated England's geographic, economic, social, religious and political features and represents an important source for historians interested in life in Elizabethan England. He gathered his facts from books, letters, maps, the notes of John Leland, and conversations with antiquaries and local historians like his friends John Stow and William Camden. He also used his own observation, experience and wit, and wrote in a conversational tone without pedantry, which has made the work a classic. The result is a compendium of Elizabethan England during the youth of William Shakespeare. "No work of the time contains so vivid and picturesque a sketch," was the assessment of The Cambridge History of English and American Literature.

Harrison also wrote a number of unpublished manuscripts, including The Great English Chronologie. This work traced fortunes of the Christian church in history, stretching from creation to his own time. In the Chronologie, Harrison revealed his sympathy with the Calvinist perspective of those seeking to reform the Church of England. At the same time, Harrison also indicated his distrust of the political intentions of England's Puritans and his ultimate loyalty to England's ecclesiastical authorities.
