= Hallingbury =

Hallingbury may refer to:

- Great Hallingbury, a village in Essex, England
- Little Hallingbury a village in Essex, England
