= 2023 Braintree District Council election =

2023 English local election

- 4 May 2023

All 49 seats to Braintree District Council 25 seats needed for a majority

	First party	Second party	Third party
Leader	Graham Butland	David Mann	n/a
Party	Conservative	Labour	Independent
Last election	34 seats, 45.5%	2 seats, 21.1%	3 seats, 5.9%
Seats before	33 (Note: Includes one vacant seat at Witham Central previously held by Conservative councillor Angela Kilmartin prior to her resignation.)	3	3
Seats after	26	9	7
Seat change	▼8	▲7	▲4
Popular vote	26,211	17,677	6,727
Percentage	39.8%	26.8%	10.2%
Swing	▼5.7pp	▲5.7pp	▲4.3pp
	Fourth party	Fifth party
Leader	James Abbott	Jackie Pell
Party	Green	Residents
Last election	6 seats, 17.8%	4 seats, 4.3%
Seats before	6	4 (Note: Includes one vacant seat at Halstead St Andrew's previously held by HRA councillor David Hume until his death in February 2023.)
Seats after	4	3
Seat change	▼2	▼1
Popular vote	10,187	2,330
Percentage	15.5%	3.5%
Swing	▼2.3pp	▼0.8pp
- Winner of each seat at the 2023 Braintree District Council election
Leader before election
Graham Butland
Conservative
Leader after election
Graham Butland
Conservative

The 2023 Braintree District Council election took place on 4 May 2023 to elect members of Braintree District Council in Essex, England. This was on the same day as other local elections in England.

The Conservatives retained control of the council, but with a reduced majority.

== Summary ==
Prior to the election the Conservatives had a majority of 17 seats on the council. They had held a majority since 2007. There were four registered political parties represented on the council plus three independent councillors. The three independents formed a political group with the Greens called the "Green and Independent Group", led by Green councillor James Abbott.

After the election, the Conservatives retained their majority but it was reduced to just 3 seats. Conservative group leader Graham Butland continued to serve as leader of the council, a position he had held continuously since 2004. The Greens and independents continued to form a group after the election, but renamed the "Independent and Green Group" and with the group leadership passing to independent councillor Joanne Beavis. The Labour group also changed their leader after the election; their previous leader David Mann had not stood for re-election so Lynn Jefferis was appointed to that role.

=== Election result ===
2023 Braintree District Council election
Party	Candidates	Seats	Gains	Losses	Net gain/loss	Seats %	Votes %	Votes	+/−
Conservative	49	26	3	11	▼8	53.1	39.8	26,211	–5.7
Green and Independent group (G&I)									
Green	22	4	0	2	▼2	8.2	15.5	10,187	–2.3
Independent	8	7	4	0	▲4	14.3	10.1	6,663	+6.5
G&I total	30	11	4	2	▲2	22.4	25.6	16,850	+4.2
Labour	49	9	7	1	▲7	18.4	26.8	17,677	+5.7
Residents	4	3	0	1	▼1	6.1	3.5	2,330	–0.8
Liberal Democrat	10	0	0	0	Steady	0.0	3.5	2,298	–0.5
Reform	4	0	0	0	Steady	0.0	0.5	321	N/A
UKIP	1	0	0	0	Steady	0.0	0.1	68	–1.1
Independent	1	0	0	0	Steady	0.0	0.1	64	–2.2
Heritage	1	0	0	0	Steady	0.0	0.1	51	N/A
Total	149	49	Turnout						

== Ward results ==
The Statement of Persons Nominated, which details the candidates standing in each ward, was released by Braintree District Council following the close of nomination on 5 April 2023. The results of the district council election were released on 5 May 2023.

Incumbent councillors are marked with an asterisk *.

=== Bocking Blackwater ===
Bocking Blackwater
Party	Candidate	Votes	%	±%
Conservative	Lyn Walters*	815	50.3	+9.4
Conservative	Justin Wrench	804	49.7	+6.3
Conservative	Lynette Bowers-Flint	773	47.7	+5.2
Green	Dormer Andrews	582	35.9	+6.8
Labour	Jasmine Curitz	576	35.6	+11.1
Labour	David Chidgey	540	33.4	+14.1
Labour	Richard Parsons	421	26.0	+7.9
Liberal Democrats	James Card	347	21.4	N/A
Turnout			25.0	–1.5
Registered electors		7,331		
Conservative hold				
Conservative hold				
Conservative hold				

=== Bocking North ===
Bocking North
Party	Candidate	Votes	%	±%
Labour	Lynn Jefferis	565	51.6	+0.5
Conservative	John Baugh	522	47.6	+9.3
Labour	Keiran Martin	506	46.2	–2.8
Conservative	Felicia Ayo-Ajala	372	33.9	N/A
Green	Andrea Phillips	226	20.6	–1.0
Turnout			28.9	+0.3
Registered electors		4,170		
Labour hold				
Conservative gain from Labour				

=== Bocking South ===
Bocking South
Party	Candidate	Votes	%	±%
Conservative	Jack Edwards	511	46.8	+1.5
Labour	Moia Thorogood	485	45.8	+11.3
Conservative	Trevor McArdle*	479	45.3	+8.8
Labour	Robert Heath	459	43.4	+9.6
Green	Karl Handy	181	17.1	–8.7
Turnout			24.7	–0.4
Registered electors		4,596		
Conservative hold				
Labour gain from Conservative				

=== Braintree Central and Beckers Green ===
Braintree Central & Beckers Green
Party	Candidate	Votes	%	±%
Labour	Shirley Mason	699	48.9	+19.5
Labour	Thomas Diamond	694	48.6	+20.2
Labour	Jonathan Ayten	687	48.1	+20.7
Conservative	Karen Brown	488	30.5	+3.7
Conservative	Sandra Canning	475	30.0	+3.3
Conservative	Andrew Hensman*	425	29.8	–5.7
Green	Simon Attwood	422	27.3	+2.3
Independent (Green)	Colin Riches	393	26.8	+0.7
Turnout			24.5	–1.7
Registered electors		6,567		
Labour gain from Conservative				
Labour gain from Conservative				
Labour gain from Conservative				

=== Braintree South ===
Braintree South
Party	Candidate	Votes	%	±%
Labour	Martin Green*	468	44.6	+14.5
Conservative	Kevin Bowers*	457	43.6	–5.9
Labour	Jacqueline Thurgood	444	42.3	+13.2
Conservative	Saif Rehman*	399	38.1	–10.4
Green	Stuart Wicks	185	17.6	–4.2
Liberal Democrats	Thomas Hughes	144	13.7	N/A
Turnout			24.4	+0.4
Registered electors		4,651		
Labour hold				
Conservative hold				

Martin Green previously gained the seat in the 2022 by-election.

=== Braintree West ===
Braintree West
Party	Candidate	Votes	%	±%
Conservative	Mary Cunningham*	727	55.1	–0.1
Conservative	George Prime	692	52.4	–1.1
Labour	Alexander Wilsdon	457	34.6	+9.3
Labour	Peter Wyatt	426	32.2	+14.9
Green	Nicholas Scales	341	25.8	+0.9
Turnout			30.6	–0.8
Registered electors		4,629		
Conservative hold				
Conservative hold				

=== Bumpstead ===
Bumpstead
Party	Candidate	Votes	%	±%
Conservative	Diana Garrod*	479	60.2	–16.0
Labour	Gary Knights	236	29.6	+5.8
Reform	Norma Saggers	81	10.2	N/A
Majority		243	30.6	–21.8
Turnout		796	34.6	–1.8
Registered electors		2,307		
Conservative hold		Swing	▼10.9	

=== Coggeshall ===
Coggeshall (2 seats)
Party	Candidate	Votes	%	±%
Independent (Green)	Tom Walsh*	981	56.5	+3.0
Independent (Green)	Dennis Abram*	928	53.4	–7.7
Conservative	Sue Wilson	540	31.1	+2.9
Conservative	Chris Siddall	478	27.5	–0.4
Labour	Robert Powers	287	16.5	+5.0
Labour	Usha Agarwal-Hollands	260	15.0	+5.0
Turnout			39.0	–4.3
Registered electors		4,602		
Independent hold				
Independent hold				

=== Gosfield and Greenstead Green ===
Gosfield & Greenstead Green
Party	Candidate	Votes	%	±%
Conservative	Peter Schwier*	396	52.6	+1.0
Green	Anne Bishop	219	29.1	–5.3
Labour	Deborah Warren	138	18.3	+4.3
Majority		177	23.5	+6.3
Turnout		753	34.9	–6.5
Registered electors		2,183		
Conservative hold		Swing	▲3.2	

=== Great Notley and Black Notley ===
Great Notley & Black Notley
Party	Candidate	Votes	%	±%
Conservative	Graham Butland*	1,028	54.6	–5.0
Conservative	Frankie Ricci*	979	52.0	–0.2
Conservative	Tom Cunningham*	969	51.5	–1.2
Green	Poppy Gerrard-Abbott	490	26.0	–0.8
Labour	Andrew Beatty	428	22.7	+7.8
Liberal Democrats	Brian Smith	387	20.5	N/A
Labour	Antony Jones	384	20.4	+6.9
Labour	Bronislaw Jagniaszek	354	18.8	+8.2
Liberal Democrats	David Toombs	347	18.4	+3.2
Liberal Democrats	Graham Sheppard	284	15.1	–1.7
Turnout			27.0	–1.2
Registered electors		7,527		
Conservative hold				
Conservative hold				
Conservative hold				

=== Halstead St. Andrews ===
Halstead St. Andrews
Party	Candidate	Votes	%	±%
Residents	James Bond	664	56.7	+3.8
Residents	Andy Munday*	632	53.9	+6.5
Conservative	David Finch	289	24.7	+2.0
Labour	Steven Knight	286	24.4	+10.5
Labour	Kathleen Tearle	255	21.8	+8.7
Conservative	Olatunbosun Senbanjo	150	12.8	–7.2
UKIP	Judith Wood	68	5.8	N/A
Turnout			25.7	–4.9
Registered electors		4,800		
Residents hold				
Residents hold				

=== Halstead Trinity ===
Halstead Trinity
Party	Candidate	Votes	%	±%
Residents	Jackie Pell*	625	54.0	–10.5
Labour	Malcolm Fincken	520	44.9	+18.4
Labour	Garry Warren	437	37.8	+14.4
Residents	Linda Hilton	409	35.4	–12.4
Conservative	Barry Britten	180	15.6	–5.0
Conservative	Liberty Poole	143	12.4	N/A
Turnout			24.3	–2.5
Registered electors		5,034		
Residents hold				
Labour gain from Residents				

=== Hatfield Peverel and Terling ===
Hatfield Peverel & Terling
Party	Candidate	Votes	%	±%
Conservative	Charley Dervish	877	63.7	+0.3
Conservative	James Coleridge*	855	62.1	+2.3
Green	Jonathan Barker	409	29.7	+6.1
Labour	Linda Bennison	312	22.7	+14.3
Labour	Anthony Bennett	299	21.7	+11.9
Turnout			30.8	–2.8
Registered electors		4,851		
Conservative hold				
Conservative hold				

=== Hedingham ===
Hedingham
Party	Candidate	Votes	%	±%
Independent (Green)	Joanne Beavis*	941	73.8	+27.2
Independent (Green)	Wendy Taylor	764	59.9	N/A
Conservative	Jason Ferrando	304	23.9	–21.9
Conservative	Philip Rawlinson	236	18.5	–8.9
Labour	Christine Calver	156	12.2	+4.4
Labour	Matthew Creamer	148	11.6	–2.7
Turnout			30.1	+0.1
Registered electors		4,452		
Independent hold				
Independent gain from Conservative				

=== Kelvedon and Feering ===
Kelvedon & Feering
Party	Candidate	Votes	%	±%
Green	Paul Thorogood*	1,096	57.4	+15.6
Green	Camilla Finch	940	49.2	–0.8
Conservative	Robert Mitchell	668	35.0	–4.2
Conservative	India Jayatillake	644	33.7	–3.0
Labour	Eileen Davidson	246	12.9	–3.5
Labour	Pamela Carlaw	226	11.8	+1.6
Turnout			43.6	+3.3
Registered electors		4,537		
Green hold				
Green hold				

=== Rayne ===
Rayne
Party	Candidate	Votes	%	±%
Independent (Green)	Ann Hooks	528	64.0	N/A
Conservative	Glenn Young	218	26.4	–27.9
Labour	Nigel Gibson	79	9.6	–3.3
Majority		310	37.6	N/A
Turnout		825	37.6	+1.8
Registered electors		2,196		
Independent gain from Conservative		Swing	N/A	

=== Silver End and Cressing ===
Silver End & Cressing
Party	Candidate	Votes	%	±%
Green	James Abbott*	1,198	75.2	–1.7
Green	Bob Wright*	1,017	63.8	+2.7
Conservative	Jacky Bayford	300	18.8	+4.5
Conservative	Darrin Hammond	297	18.6	N/A
Labour	Steven Bennison	134	8.4	+2.6
Labour	Ann Griffin	126	7.9	+0.9
Independent	Annetta Hawkins	64	4.0	N/A
Heritage	Andrew Page	51	3.2	N/A
Turnout			31.5	–7.0
Registered electors		5,275		
Green hold				
Green hold				

=== Stour Valley North ===
Stour Valley North
Party	Candidate	Votes	%	±%
Conservative	Iona Parker*	507	55.6	–28.7
Labour	Peter Long	172	18.9	+3.2
Green	Mark Posen	167	18.3	N/A
Reform	Raymond Richards	66	7.2	N/A
Majority		335	36.7	–32.0
Turnout		912	36.0	–3.1
Registered electors		2,326		
Conservative hold		Swing	▼16.0	

=== Stour Valley South ===
Stour Valley South
Party	Candidate	Votes	%	±%
Conservative	David Holland	549	59.3	–2.4
Green	Paul Robinson	221	23.9	N/A
Labour	Frederick Hearn	156	16.8	+8.4
Majority		328	35.4	+3.6
Turnout		926	38.0	–0.9
Registered electors		2,484		
Conservative hold		Swing	N/A	

=== The Colnes ===
The Colnes
Party	Candidate	Votes	%	±%
Conservative	George Courtauld*	724	56.3	–9.1
Conservative	Gabrielle Spray*	707	55.0	–7.4
Green	James Astley	549	42.7	–2.1
Labour	Sandra Hindley	346	26.9	+8.2
Labour	Felix Preston	247	19.2	+8.6
Turnout			30.8	+4.3
Registered electors		4,718		
Conservative hold				
Conservative hold				

=== Three Fields ===
Three Fields
Party	Candidate	Votes	%	±%
Independent (Green)	Mark Ault	995	53.1	N/A
Independent (Green)	Michael Staines	851	45.4	N/A
Conservative	John Warner	818	43.6	–26.2
Conservative	Stephen Canning	593	31.6	–30.0
Labour	William Edwards	265	14.1	–3.7
Labour	Stephen Newton	228	12.2	–5.2
Turnout			43.2	+10.2
Registered electors		4,597		
Independent gain from Conservative				
Independent gain from Conservative				

=== Witham Central ===
Witham Central
Party	Candidate	Votes	%	±%
Conservative	Sindhu Rajeev	510	39.7	–6.0
Conservative	Toby Williams	486	37.9	+1.5
Labour	Lucy Barlow	362	28.2	+11.5
Green	Edwyn Gerrard-Abbott	358	27.9	–3.9
Labour	Joan Coleman	288	22.4	+6.5
Liberal Democrats	Barry Fleet	259	20.2	–10.7
Liberal Democrats	Helen Waring	198	15.4	N/A
Reform	Richard Thomson	107	8.3	N/A
Turnout			27.9	–0.1
Registered electors		4,940		
Conservative hold				
Conservative hold				

=== Witham North ===
Witham North
Party	Candidate	Votes	%	±%
Conservative	Billy Taylor	568	39.6	+10.2
Conservative	Ethan Williams	543	37.8	+8.8
Labour	Philip Barlow	477	33.2	+1.4
Labour	Leanora Headley	418	29.1	+4.8
Green	Stephen Hicks*	401	27.9	–7.9
Green	Philip Hughes	396	27.6	–12.0
Reform	Timothy Blaxill	67	4.7	N/A
Turnout			26.9	–3.1
Registered electors		5,496		
Conservative gain from Green				
Conservative gain from Green				

=== Witham South ===
Witham South
Party	Candidate	Votes	%	±%
Labour	Paul Heath	501	44.5	+21.1
Labour	Jacqueline Martin	473	42.0	+20.2
Conservative	William Korsinah	448	39.8	–14.7
Conservative	Joe Trigg	424	37.6	–12.7
Green	Stephanie Bills	174	15.4	N/A
Liberal Democrats	Paul Hewitt	137	12.2	–16.7
Liberal Democrats	Charles Ryland	97	8.6	–17.6
Turnout			26.0	+2.0
Registered electors		4,519		
Labour gain from Conservative				
Labour gain from Conservative				

=== Witham West ===
Witham West
Party	Candidate	Votes	%	±%
Conservative	Jon Hayes	533	40.1	–3.5
Conservative	Ron Ramage*	520	39.1	–2.1
Labour	Jack Coleman	467	35.1	+9.2
Labour	Jack Robertson	427	32.1	+14.5
Green	Susan Ager	361	27.1	–2.3
Green	Steven Crane	254	19.1	N/A
Liberal Democrats	Andrew Holt	98	7.4	–6.5
Turnout			28.3	–0.8
Registered electors		4,880		
Conservative hold				
Conservative hold				

=== Yeldham ===
Yeldham
Party	Candidate	Votes	%	±%
Conservative	Richard Van Dulken	312	44.2	–27.9
Independent (Green)	Julia Allen	282	39.9	N/A
Labour	Denis Franklin	112	15.9	–12.0
Turnout		706	32.1	+1.0
Registered electors		2,210		
Conservative hold		Swing	N/A	

== Changes 2023–2027 ==
- On 27 February 2025, Conservative councillor Ron Ramage (Witham West) left the party to sit as an independent.
- By January 2026, Independent councillor Tom Walsh (Coggeshall) had joined the Green Party.
- In January 2026, Green Party councillor Tom Walsh resigned his Coggeshall seat, triggering a by-election.
- Ramage had rejoined the Conservative Party by 14 September 2026, apparently around late August or early September 2026; no evidence has been found that he sat for Reform UK in the interim.
- By September 2026, Halstead Residents' Association councillor James Bond (Halstead St. Andrews) had left the party to sit as an independent.
- In September 2026, four councillors elected in 2023 as independents — Joanne Beavis and Wendy Taylor (both Hedingham), Dennis Abram (Coggeshall) and Ann Hooks (Rayne) — collectively joined the Conservative Party.

=== By-elections ===
==== Coggeshall ====
The by-election was triggered by the resignation of Green Party councillor Tom Walsh, who had been elected in 2023 as an independent.

Coggeshall by-election: 5 March 2026
Party	Candidate	Votes	%	±%
Reform	Nathan Robins	554	30.7	N/A
Independent (Green)	Colin Riches	517	28.7	−25.6
Labour	Sarah Neal	366	20.3	+4.4
Conservative	India Jayatillake	311	17.2	−12.7
Liberal Democrats	Barry Fleet	55	3.1	N/A
Majority		37	2.1	N/A
Turnout		1,809	37.1	–1.9
Registered electors		4,872		
Reform gain from Green				
