= 2019 Braintree District Council election =

Local election in the United Kingdom

- 2 May 2019

All 49 seats to Braintree District Council 25 seats needed for a majority
- Turnout: 30.78% (Note: Calculated from the 34,696 ballot papers issued and 112,733 registered electors recorded across the 26 wards' declarations of result; see the ward-by-ward results below.) (▼36.7%)

	First party	Second party
Leader	Graham Butland	James Abbott
Party	Conservative	Green and Independent group
Leader's seat	Great Notley & Black Notley	Silver End & Cressing
Last election	44 seats, 47.2%	1 seat, 11.3%
Seats before	39	1
Seats won	34	8
Seat change	▼10	▲7
Popular vote	28,600	13,434
Percentage	45.5%	21.4%
Swing	▼1.7%	▲10.1%
	Third party	Fourth party
Leader	Jackie Pell	David Mann
Party	Halstead Residents	Labour
Leader's seat	Halstead Trinity	Bocking North
Last election	2 seats, 3.1%	2 seats, 19.9%
Seats before	2	4
Seats won	4	2
Seat change	▲2	Steady
Popular vote	2,722	13,278
Percentage	4.3%	21.1%
Swing	▲1.3%	▲1.3%
- Map showing the results of the 2019 Braintree District Council election: Conservative; Green; Independent (Green and Independent group); Halstead Residents; Labour; Other Independent
Leader before election
Graham Butland
Conservative
Elected Leader
Graham Butland
Conservative

The 2019 Braintree District Council election took place on 2 May 2019 to elect members of Braintree District Council in England. This was on the same day as other local elections.

Some minor ward boundary changes were made in February 2019. 49 members were elected from 26 wards.

Before the election, an alliance was formed between the Liberal Democrats, Greens and the two Independent candidates standing in Coggeshall, such that the two parties did not stand against each other in most wards, and neither stood in Coggeshall. The elected Green and Independent councillors formed a political group on the new Council.

The election returned a much reduced Conservative majority, down from 39 in 2015 to 19. The Green and Independent group became the largest opposition for the first time, with 8 seats, entirely in the southeast of the district.

== Summary ==
=== Election result ===
2019 Braintree District Council election
Party	Candidates	Seats	Gains	Losses	Net gain/loss	Seats %	Votes %	Votes	+/−
Conservative	46	34	1	11	−10	69.4	45.5	28,600	−1.7
Green and Independent group									
Green	22	6	5	0	+5	12.2	17.8	11,165	+6.5
Independent	2	2	2	0	+2	4.1	3.6	2,269	+3.6
Group total	24	8	7	0	+7	16.3	21.4	13,434	+10.1
Halstead Residents	4	4	2	0	+2	8.2	4.3	2,722	+1.3
Labour	49	2	1	1	0	4.1	21.1	13,278	+1.3
Independent	3	1	1	0	+1	2.0	2.4	1,481	+2.0
Liberal Democrat	10	0	0	0	0	0.0	4.0	2,540	+1.4
UKIP	2	0	0	0	0	0.0	1.2	771	−14.3
Total	138	49	Turnout				31.2	34,696	−36.3

== Results by ward ==
=== Bocking Blackwater ===
Bocking Blackwater (3 seats)
Party	Candidate	Votes	%	±%
Conservative	Jean Schmitt	862	43.4	−8.8
Conservative	Trevor McArdle	844	42.5	+8.0
Conservative	Lyn Walters	813	40.9	+9.3
Green	John Malam	579	29.1	+20.1
Labour	Agnes Bishop	487	24.5	+6.7
UKIP	Leo Jenner	479	24.1	N/A
Labour	Merle Morris	384	19.3	+4.6
Labour	Richard Parsons	359	18.1	+4.8
Turnout		1,995	26.54	−39.3
Rejected ballots		7	0.4	N/A
Registered electors		7,517		
Conservative hold				
Conservative hold				
Conservative hold				

=== Bocking North ===
Bocking North (2 seats)
Party	Candidate	Votes	%	±%
Labour	David Mann	593	51.1	+17.1
Labour	Tony Everard	569	49.0	+18.1
Conservative	Philip Rawlinson	445	38.3	−1.8
Green	Dawn Holmes	251	21.6	+13.4
Turnout		1,187	28.60	−37.6
Rejected ballots		26	2.2	+1.8
Registered electors		4,151		
Labour hold				
Labour gain from Conservative				

=== Bocking South ===
Bocking South (2 seats)
Party	Candidate	Votes	%	±%
Conservative	David Baugh	511	46.8	+9.8
Conservative	Ian Pritchard	399	36.5	+10.3
Labour	Moia Thorogood	377	34.5	+5.7
Labour	Lynn Jefferis	369	33.8	+6.6
Green	Simon Attwood	282	25.8	+16.4
Turnout		1,115	25.09	−32.3
Rejected ballots		23	2.1	+1.9
Registered electors		4,444		
Conservative hold				
Conservative gain from Labour				

=== Braintree Central and Beckers Green ===
Braintree Central and Beckers Green (3 seats)
Party	Candidate	Votes	%	±%
Conservative	Andrew Hensman	596	35.5	−2.1
Conservative	Justin Wrench	512	30.5	−4.5
Conservative	Saif Rehman	504	30.0	−2.4
Labour	Celia Shute	494	29.4	+4.0
Independent	Colin Riches	481	28.6	N/A
Labour	Antony Jones	477	28.4	−2.3
Labour	William Edwards	461	27.4	+2.0
Green	Dormer Andrews	459	27.3	+10.2
Independent	David Mansell	382	22.7	N/A
Turnout		1,702	26.22	−31.3
Rejected ballots		22	1.3	+0.7
Registered electors		6,491		
Conservative hold				
Conservative hold				
Conservative hold				

=== Braintree South ===
Braintree South (2 seats)
Party	Candidate	Votes	%	±%
Conservative	Kevin Bowers	539	49.5	−4.2
Conservative	Dean Wallace	528	48.5	+6.5
Labour	Martin Green	327	30.1	−5.2
Labour	Edith Aganoke	317	29.1	−5.4
Green	Nicholas Scales	237	21.8	N/A
Turnout		1,117	23.98	−35.7
Rejected ballots		29	2.6	-0.1
Registered electors		4,659		
Conservative hold				
Conservative hold				

=== Braintree West ===
Braintree West (2 seats)
Party	Candidate	Votes	%	±%
Conservative	Mary Cunningham	804	55.1	+18.6
Conservative	John McKee	780	53.5	−3.0
Labour	Andrew Beatty	369	25.3	+4.8
Green	Edwyn Gerrard-Abbott	363	24.9	+13.1
Labour	Keiran Martin	253	17.3	−1.8
Turnout		1,480	31.45	−36.9
Rejected ballots		21	1.4	+1.1
Registered electors		4,706		
Conservative hold				
Conservative hold				

=== Bumpstead ===
Bumpstead
Party	Candidate	Votes	%	±%
Conservative	Diana Garrod	628	76.2	+14.4
Labour	Jacqueline Thurgood	196	23.8	+5.2
Majority		432	52.4	+10.2
Turnout		854	36.4	−39.3
Rejected ballots		30	3.5	+2.7
Registered electors		2,346		
Conservative hold		Swing	+4.6	

=== Coggeshall ===
Coggeshall (2 seats)
Party	Candidate	Votes	%	±%
Independent	Nick Unsworth	1,210	61.1	N/A
Independent	Tom Walsh	1,059	53.5	N/A
Conservative	Alan Dunn	559	28.2	−23.1
Conservative	Lynette Flint	552	27.9	−14.1
Labour	Gary Knights	228	11.5	−8.0
Labour	Eileen Davidson	198	10.0	−5.8
Turnout		1,989	43.34	−33.1
Rejected ballots		9	0.5	-0.4
Registered electors		4,589		
Independent gain from Conservative				
Independent gain from Conservative				

=== Gosfield and Greenstead Green ===
Gosfield and Greenstead Green
Party	Candidate	Votes	%	±%
Conservative	Peter Schwier	445	51.6	−16.1
Green	Anne Bishop	297	34.4	+20.6
Labour	Deborah Warren	121	14.0	−4.4
Majority		148	17.1	−32.1
Turnout		908	41.39	−36.6
Rejected ballots		45	5.0	+3.4
Registered electors		2,194		
Conservative hold		Swing	-18.3	

=== Great Notley and Black Notley ===
Great Notley and Black Notley (3 seats)
Party	Candidate	Votes	%	±%
Conservative	Graham Butland	1,191	59.6	−1.3
Conservative	Tom Cunningham	1,053	52.7	±0.0
Conservative	Francesco Ricci	1,044	52.2	+1.9
Green	Freddie Gerrard-Abbott	536	26.8	+13.9
Liberal Democrats	Graham Sheppard	336	16.8	N/A
Liberal Democrats	David Toombs	303	15.2	N/A
Labour	Juliet Walton	298	14.9	+1.1
Labour	Collette Gibson	269	13.5	±0.0
Labour	Bronislaw Jagniaszek	211	10.6	−2.4
Turnout		2,039	28.21	−43.0
Rejected ballots		40	2.0	+1.5
Registered electors		7,228		
Conservative hold				
Conservative hold				
Conservative hold				

=== Halstead St Andrews ===
Halstead St Andrews (2 seats)
Party	Candidate	Votes	%	±%
Halstead Residents	David Hume	701	52.7	+11.5
Halstead Residents	Mick Radley	628	47.3	+22.6
Conservative	Stephen Kirby	301	22.6	−12.3
Conservative	Robert Pye	265	19.9	−7.9
Labour	Stephen Knight	184	13.8	−2.1
Labour	Pauline Amos	174	13.1	+3.2
Green	Daniel Shadbolt	157	11.8	+3.9
Turnout		1,358	30.63	−34.6
Rejected ballots		29	2.1	-0.1
Registered electors		4,433		
Halstead Residents hold				
Halstead Residents gain from Conservative				

=== Halstead Trinity ===
Halstead Trinity (2 seats)
Party	Candidate	Votes	%	±%
Halstead Residents	Jackie Pell	800	64.5	+18.9
Halstead Residents	Andy Munday	593	47.8	N/A
Labour	Malcolm Fincken	329	26.5	−1.4
Labour	Garry Warren	290	23.4	+5.5
Conservative	Julia Allen	256	20.6	−19.6
Turnout		1,252	26.81	−33.3
Rejected ballots		12	1.0	-0.7
Registered electors		4,670		
Halstead Residents hold				
Halstead Residents gain from Conservative				

=== Hatfield Peverel and Terling ===
Hatfield Peverel and Terling (2 seats)
Party	Candidate	Votes	%	±%
Conservative	Joanne Dervish	955	63.4	+21.5
Conservative	David Bebb	901	59.8	+7.7
Green	Jonathan Barker	355	23.6	+13.8
Liberal Democrats	Pamela Hooper	174	11.5	N/A
Labour	Anthony Bennett	148	9.8	−2.9
Labour	Nick Fogden	127	8.4	−0.6
Liberal Democrats	David Wheeler	102	6.8	N/A
Turnout		1,547	33.59	−39.7
Rejected ballots		40	2.6	+1.8
Registered electors		4,605		
Conservative hold				
Conservative hold				

=== Hedingham ===
Hedingham (2 seats)
Party	Candidate	Votes	%	±%
Independent	Jo Beavis	618	46.6	N/A
Conservative	Hylton Johnson	607	45.8	+4.9
Green	Stephanie Bills	374	28.2	N/A
Conservative	Nigel McCrea	363	27.4	−21.6
Labour	Matthew Creamer	190	14.3	−2.4
Labour	Denis Franklin	104	7.8	−8.8
Turnout		1,344	29.98	−36.6
Rejected ballots		18	1.3	+0.8
Registered electors		4,483		
Independent gain from Conservative				
Conservative hold				

=== Kelvedon and Feering ===
Kelvedon and Feering (2 seats)
Party	Candidate	Votes	%	±%
Green	Jennifer Sandum	857	50.0	+29.4
Green	Paul Thorogood	717	41.8	N/A
Conservative	Robert Mitchell	672	39.2	−17.9
Conservative	John Elliott	629	36.7	−23.3
Labour	Ian Marshall	281	16.4	−6.2
Labour	Robert Powers	175	10.2	−11.4
Turnout		1,729	40.29	−36.1
Rejected ballots		14	0.8	-0.3
Registered electors		4,291		
Green gain from Conservative				
Green gain from Conservative				

=== Rayne ===
Rayne
Party	Candidate	Votes	%	±%
Conservative	Paul Euesden	430	54.3	−7.5
Green	Poppy Gerrard-Abbott	260	32.8	+26.1
Labour	Nigel Gibson	102	12.9	+1.9
Majority		170	21.5	−19.8
Turnout		805	35.76	−37.0
Rejected ballots		13	1.6	+1.1
Registered electors		2,251		
Conservative hold		Swing	-16.8	

=== Silver End and Cressing ===
Silver End and Cressing (2 seats)
Party	Candidate	Votes	%	±%
Green	James Abbott	1,334	76.9	+27.6
Green	Bob Wright	1,059	61.1	+33.1
UKIP	Sean Perkins	292	16.8	−5.8
Conservative	Behiye Karaman-Naci	248	14.3	−17.5
Labour	Ann Griffin	121	7.0	−5.5
Labour	Richard Tuff	100	5.8	−3.8
Turnout		1,740	37.49	−31.1
Rejected ballots		6	0.3	-0.0
Registered electors		4,641		
Green hold				
Green gain from Conservative				

=== Stour Valley North ===
Stour Valley North
Party	Candidate	Votes	%	±%
Conservative	Iona Parker	716	84.3	+21.8
Labour	Peter Long	133	15.7	+0.0
Majority		583	68.7	+28.0
Turnout		901	39.09	−37.5
Rejected ballots		52	5.8	N/A
Registered electors		2,305		
Conservative hold		Swing	+10.9	

=== Stour Valley South ===
Stour Valley South
Party	Candidate	Votes	%	±%
Conservative	Wendy Scattergood	565	61.7	+3.2
Liberal Democrats	Stephen Bolter	274	29.9	+14.8
Labour	Fredrick Hearn	77	8.4	−3.8
Majority		291	31.8	−11.6
Turnout		948	38.90	−39.9
Rejected ballots		32	3.4	+2.8
Registered electors		2,437		
Conservative hold		Swing	-5.8	

=== The Colnes ===
The Colnes (2 seats)
Party	Candidate	Votes	%	±%
Conservative	George Courtauld	755	65.4	+3.5
Conservative	Gabrielle Spray	721	62.4	+13.5
Green	Alan Sheppard	517	44.8	+26.0
Labour	Tamsin Cleeve	216	18.7	−0.3
Labour	Cornelius Coughlan	122	10.6	+0.4
Turnout		1,181	26.47	−46.3
Rejected ballots		26	2.2	+1.1
Registered electors		4,462		
Conservative hold				
Conservative hold				

=== Three Fields ===
Three Fields (2 seats)
Party	Candidate	Votes	%	±%
Conservative	Peter Tattersley	1,021	69.8	+16.2
Conservative	Vanessa Santomauro	901	61.6	+15.5
Green	Andrea Phillips	585	40.0	+28.7
Labour	Margaret Lynch	260	17.8	+2.5
Labour	Barry Foskett	255	17.4	+5.8
Turnout		1,498	33.02	−42.2
Rejected ballots		35	2.3	+2.0
Registered electors		4,536		
Conservative hold				
Conservative hold				

=== Witham Central ===
Witham Central (2 seats)
Party	Candidate	Votes	%	±%
Conservative	Angela Kilmartin	552	45.7	+2.0
Conservative	Susan Wilson	439	36.4	−8.9
Green	Nelson Brunton	384	31.8	+15.0
Liberal Democrats	Barry Fleet	373	30.9	+14.6
Labour	Kathleen Tearle	202	16.7	−5.6
Labour	Jack Coleman	192	15.9	−3.1
Turnout		1,228	28.31	−32.5
Rejected ballots		21	1.7	+0.4
Registered electors		4,378		
Conservative hold				
Conservative hold				

=== Witham North ===
Labour gained one of the Conservative seats in a 2016 by-election.

Witham North (2 seats)
Party	Candidate	Votes	%	±%
Green	Michelle Weeks	596	39.6	+18.4
Green	Stephen Hicks	539	35.8	N/A
Labour	Philip Barlow	479	31.8	−0.8
Conservative	Jacky Bayford	443	29.4	−10.9
Conservative	JoAnn Williams	437	29.0	−8.5
Labour	Leanora Headley	366	24.3	−0.6
Turnout		1,536	30.02	−31.3
Rejected ballots		31	2.0	+0.2
Registered electors		5,116		
Green gain from Labour Co-op				
Green gain from Conservative				

=== Witham South ===
Witham South (2 seats)
Party	Candidate	Votes	%	±%
Conservative	James Coleridge	587	54.5	+3.8
Conservative	Ronald Ramage	542	50.3	+4.9
Liberal Democrats	Kate Onions	312	28.9	+20.0
Liberal Democrats	Charles Ryland	282	26.2	+18.9
Labour	Pamela Carlaw	252	23.4	−2.6
Labour	Thomas Hewitt	235	21.8	+3.2
Turnout		1,117	24.02	−38.0
Rejected ballots		39	3.5	+1.6
Registered electors		4,651		
Conservative hold				
Conservative hold				

=== Witham West ===
Witham West (2 seats)
Party	Candidate	Votes	%	±%
Conservative	Bill Rose	633	43.6	+0.7
Conservative	Patrick Horner	599	41.2	−5.7
Green	Philip Hughes	427	29.4	+14.8
Labour	Lucy Barlow	376	25.9	−3.0
Labour	Antony Gore	256	17.6	−10.2
Liberal Democrats	James Fleet	202	13.9	+2.2
Liberal Democrats	Helen Waring	182	12.5	N/A
Turnout		1,463	29.15	−33.4
Rejected ballots		10	0.7	-1.0
Registered electors		5,019		
Conservative hold				
Conservative hold				

=== Yeldham ===
Yeldham
Party	Candidate	Votes	%	±%
Conservative	Richard van Dulken	453	72.1	+16.2
Labour	Noel Owen	175	27.9	+9.4
Majority		278	44.3	+14.0
Turnout		663	31.13	−42.0
Rejected ballots		35	5.3	+4.3
Registered electors		2,130		
Conservative hold		Swing	+3.4	

== Changes 2019–2023 ==
- In December 2020, Conservative councillor Ronald Ramage resigned his Witham South seat, triggering a by-election.
- In March 2021, Conservative councillor David Bebb resigned his Hatfield Peverel and Terling seat, triggering a by-election.
- In January 2021, Independent councillor Nick Unsworth, elected in Coggeshall, joined the Green Party.
- In January 2022, Conservative councillor Dean Wallace, elected in Braintree South, left the party to sit as an independent.
- In August 2022, Nick Unsworth left the Green Party to sit as an independent again.
- In September 2022, Dean Wallace resigned his Braintree South seat, triggering a by-election.
- In October 2022, Nick Unsworth resigned his Coggeshall seat, triggering a by-election.
- On 17 February 2023, Halstead Residents' Association councillor David Hume died; no by-election was held as his term was due to end at the May 2023 election.

=== By-elections ===
==== Hatfield Peverel and Terling ====
The by-election was triggered by the resignation of Conservative councillor David Bebb.

Hatfield Peverel and Terling: 6 May 2021
Party	Candidate	Votes	%	±%
Conservative	Darren White	1,009	61.4	+1.6
Green	Jonathan Barker	315	19.2	−4.4
Labour	Jack Coleman	195	11.9	+2.1
Independent	David Hodges	124	7.5	N/A
Majority		694	42.2	N/A
Turnout		1,650	35.56	+2.0
Rejected ballots		7	0.4	N/A
Registered electors		4,639		
Conservative hold		Swing	▲3.0	

==== Witham South ====
The by-election was triggered by the resignation of Conservative councillor Ronald Ramage.

Witham South: 6 May 2021
Party	Candidate	Votes	%	±%
Conservative	Kwame Korsinah	623	51.5	+1.2
Labour	Paul Heath	339	28.0	+4.6
Green	Philip Hughes	157	13.0	N/A
Liberal Democrats	Charles Ryland	91	7.5	−18.7
Majority		284	23.5	N/A
Turnout		1,217	26.51	+2.5
Rejected ballots		7	0.6	N/A
Registered electors		4,590		
Conservative hold		Swing	▼1.7	

==== Braintree South ====
The by-election was triggered by the resignation of Independent councillor Dean Wallace, who had left the Conservatives in January 2022.

Braintree South: 10 November 2022
Party	Candidate	Votes	%	±%
Labour	Martin Green	372	45.2	+15.6
Conservative	Stephen Canning	317	38.5	−10.4
Green	Simon Attwood	134	16.3	−5.2
Majority		55	6.7	N/A
Turnout		827	17.43	−6.6
Rejected ballots		4	0.5	N/A
Registered electors		4,745		
Labour gain from Conservative		Swing	▲13.0	

==== Coggeshall ====
The by-election was triggered by the resignation of Independent councillor Nick Unsworth, who had briefly sat as a Green Party councillor before returning to the Independent benches in August 2022.

Coggeshall: 10 November 2022
Party	Candidate	Votes	%	±%
Independent	Dennis Abram	576	43.5	−17.1
Conservative	Chris Siddall	451	34.1	+6.1
Labour	Robert Powers	297	22.4	+11.0
Majority		125	9.4	N/A
Turnout		1,328	28.28	−15.0
Rejected ballots		4	0.3	N/A
Registered electors		4,696		
Independent hold		Swing	▼11.6	
