= Chelmsford Rural District =

Former local government area in the UK

Coordinates: 51.77°N 0.48°E

Chelmsford
- Rural district
- Area
  - 1911: 83,045 acres (33,607 ha)
  - 1971: 86,519 acres (35,013 ha)
- Population
  - 1901: 20,725
  - 1971: 71,027
- History
  - Created: 28 December 1894
  - Abolished: 31 March 1974
  - Succeeded by: Chelmsford; Brentwood
- Status: Rural district
  - HQ: Chelmsford

Chelmsford Rural District was a rural district in Essex, England, from 1894 to 1974. It surrounded, but did not include, the town of Chelmsford, which was a separate borough. The district was abolished in 1974 when most of its area was merged with the borough of Chelmsford to former a larger non-metropolitan district and borough of Chelmsford.

== History ==
The district had its origins in the Chelmsford Poor Law Union, which had been created in 1835 for a group of parishes to collectively deliver their responsibilities under the poor laws. A workhouse to serve the union was built in 1837 at Wood Street in the south-western suburbs of Chelmsford. That workhouse was destroyed in a fire in 1886. A replacement workhouse was built on the same site, opening in 1889.

In 1872, sanitary districts were established. In rural areas, public health and local government responsibilities were given to the existing boards of guardians of poor law unions. The Chelmsford Rural Sanitary District therefore covered the poor law union with the exception of the parish of Chelmsford itself, which formed its own urban sanitary district, having been made a local board district in 1850. The town of Chelmsford was subsequently incorporated as a municipal borough in 1888.

Rural sanitary districts were reconstituted as rural districts with their own elected councils with effect from 28 December 1894, under the Local Government Act 1894. The link with the poor law union continued in that all the rural district councillors were thereafter ex officio members of the board of guardians. Chelmsford Rural District Council held its first official meeting on 1 January 1895. Edward Corder, a farmer from Writtle, was appointed the first chairman of the council. He had chaired of the board of guardians since 1883, and went on to serve as chairman of the council until shortly before his death in 1899.

The rural district ceded part of the parish of Springfield (including the village itself) and part of the parish of Writtle to the borough of Chelmsford in 1907. In 1934 there were further changes to the district boundary, when the borough of Chelmsford gained 1,659 acres (671 ha) from the rural district, including parts of the parishes of Broomfield, Springfield, Widford, and Writtle. At the same time 1,282 acres (519 ha) were transferred from Buttsbury parish to form part of Billericay Urban District. Later that year, an area of 6,128 acres (2,480 ha), made up of Mountnessing and parts of the parishes of Downham, Ramsden Bellhouse, Ramsden Crays and Shenfield, was gained from the abolished Billericay Rural District. Also at this time 274 acres (111 ha) was gained from the parish of Hockley in Rochford Rural District.

The district was abolished in 1974. The two parishes of Ingatestone and Fryerning and Mountnessing were transferred to the Brentwood, and the remainder of the old rural district merged with the municipal borough of Chelmsford to form the current non-metropolitan district and borough of Chelmsford.

== Parishes ==
The civil parishes in the district were:

- Boreham
- Broomfield
- Buttsbury
- Chignal St James
- Danbury
- East Hanningfield
- Good Easter
- Great Baddow
- Great Leighs
- Great Waltham
- Highwood
- Ingatestone and Fryerning
- Little Baddow
- Little Leighs
- Little Waltham
- Margaretting
- Mashbury
- Mountnessing (after 1934)
- Pleshey
- Rettendon
- Roxwell
- Runwell
- Sandon
- South Hanningfield
- Springfield
- Stock
- West Hanningfield
- Widford (parish abolished as part of the 1934 boundary changes)
- Woodham Ferrers
- Writtle

== Premises ==
The rural district council was always based in the town of Chelmsford, which was not part of the council's own administrative area. In its early years, the council met at the workhouse and its staff were based at offices on Waterloo Lane in the centre of Chelmsford.

In 1938 the council moved to a purpose-built office at 88 New London Road. After the council's abolition the building was renamed the Gemini Centre.
