= Ashen, Essex =

Village in Essex, England

Coordinates: 52.0527°N 0.5441°E

Ashen
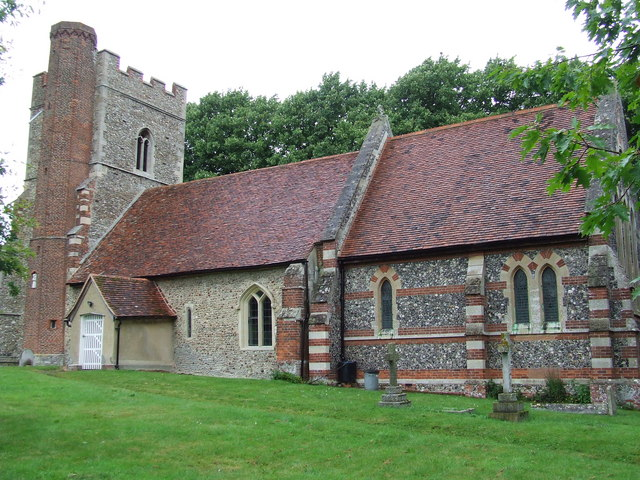
- St Augustine Of Canterbury, Ashen

- Location within Essex
- Population: 354 (Parish, 2021)
- OS grid reference: TL745424
- Civil parish: Ashen
- District: Braintree
- Shire county: Essex
- Region: East
- Country: England
- Sovereign state: United Kingdom
- Post town: SUDBURY
- Postcode district: CO10
- Police: Essex
- Fire: Essex
- Ambulance: East of England
- UK Parliament: Saffron Walden

Ashen is a village and civil parish in Essex, England. It is located about 8 km (5.0 mi) east-southeast of Haverhill and is 36 km (22 mi) north from the county town of Chelmsford. The village lies to the south of the River Stour, which here forms the county boundary with Suffolk. The village is in the district of Braintree and in the parliamentary constituency of the same name. The parish is part of the Bumpsteads and Upper Colne parish cluster.

At the 2021 census the parish had a population of 354.
