= Saffron Walden Rural District =

Former local government area in Essex, England

Coordinates: 51.99°N 0.20°E

Saffron Walden
- History
  - Created: 1894
  - Abolished: 1974
  - Succeeded by: Uttlesford District
- Status: Rural district
  - HQ: Saffron Walden

Saffron Walden Rural District was a rural district in the county of Essex, England. It was created in 1894 and later enlarged by the addition of the parishes of Berden, Birchanger, Elsenham, Farnham, Henham-on-the-Hill, Manuden, Stansted Mountfitchet and Ugley from the disbanded Stansted Rural District. It was named after and administered from Saffron Walden.

Since 1 April 1974 it has formed part of the District of Uttlesford.

At the time of its dissolution it consisted of the following 31 civil parishes.

- Arkesden
- Ashdon
- Berden
- Birchanger
- Chrishall
- Clavering
- Debden
- Elmdon
- Elsenham
- Farnham
- Great Chesterford
- Great Sampford
- Hadstock
- Hempstead
- Henham-on-the-Hill
- Langley
- Littlebury
- Little Chesterford
- Little Sampford
- Manuden
- Newport
- Quendon and Rickling
- Radwinter
- Stansted Mountfitchet
- Strethall
- Ugley
- Wenden Lofts
- Wendens Ambo
- Wicken Bonhunt
- Widdington
- Wimbish
