= Ovington, Essex =

Village and civil parish in Essex, England

Coordinates: 52.051°N 0.577°E

Ovington
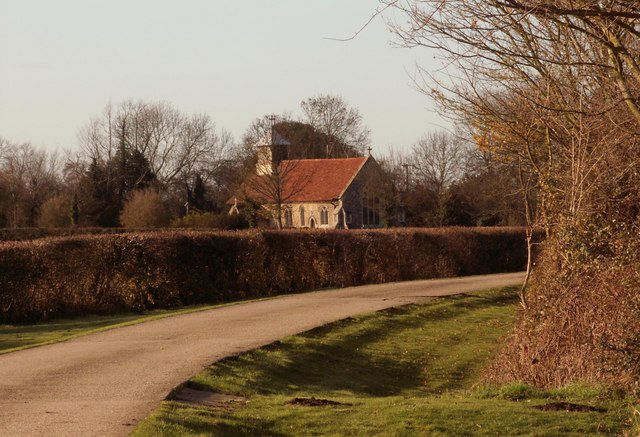
- St Mary's Church

- Location within Essex
- Population: 65 (Parish, 2021)
- Civil parish: Ovington
- District: Braintree
- Shire county: Essex
- Region: East
- Country: England
- Sovereign state: United Kingdom
- Post town: SUDBURY
- Postcode district: CO10

Ovington is a village and civil parish in the Braintree district, in north Essex, England. The village is situated about 3 miles (5 km) south of Clare and 6 miles (10 km) west of Sudbury, its post town, both of which are over the county boundary in Suffolk. The village consists of the parish church, dedicated to St Mary, and a few houses. There is the air traffic of Ridgewell Airfield. (Usually gliders and sometimes military training exercises.) At the 2021 census the parish had a population of 65.

The earliest mention of this place is in the Domesday Book of 1086, where it is mentioned together with Hedingham Castle and listed amongst the lands given to Roger Bigod by the King. The land given to Roger included 24 acres (97,000 m^{2}) of meadow that was (in total) valued at four pounds.
