= Halstead Rural District =

Former local government area in the UK

Coordinates: 52.0°N 0.6°E

Halstead was a rural district in Essex, England from 1894 to 1974. It was created by the Local Government Act 1894 as a successor to the Halstead rural sanitary district.

In 1934 it was greatly enlarged by adding the areas of the disbanded Belchamp Rural District and Bumpstead Rural District.

It was abolished under the Local Government Act 1972 and now forms part of the district of Braintree.
