= Braintree Rural District =

Former local government area in the UK

Coordinates: 51.9°N 0.5°E

Braintree
- History
  - Created: 1894
  - Abolished: 1974
  - Succeeded by: Braintree District
- Status: Rural district
  - HQ: Bocking

Braintree Rural District was a local government district in the county of Essex, England. Established under the Local Government Act 1894, it served as an administrative division in the rural areas surrounding Braintree.

== History ==
Braintree Rural District was created in 1894 as part of widespread local government reforms. It initially encompassed numerous civil parishes within the county of Essex.

In 1934, the district underwent significant changes when the parish of Bocking was removed and merged into the newly established Braintree and Bocking Urban District. This division resulted in the rural district being split into two separate geographical areas. Despite this reorganization, the district retained its name and was administered from Bocking.

On 1 April 1974, the district was abolished under the Local Government Act 1972. Its area was incorporated into the newly formed Braintree District, which combined several urban and rural areas in the region.

== Civil parishes ==
At the time of its dissolution in 1974, Braintree Rural District comprised 20 civil parishes:

- Bardfield Saling
- Black Notley
- Bradwell
- Coggeshall
- Cressing
- Fairstead
- Faulkbourne
- Feering
- Finchingfield
- Great Bardfield
- Great Saling
- Hatfield Peverel
- Kelvedon
- Panfield
- Rayne
- Shalford
- Stisted
- Terling
- Wethersfield
- White Notley

== Legacy ==
The Braintree Rural District's legacy continues as part of the larger administrative area of the District of Braintree, which governs a mix of urban and rural communities.
