= Highwood, Essex =

Village and civil parish in Essex, UK

Coordinates: 51.711°N 0.375°E

Highwood
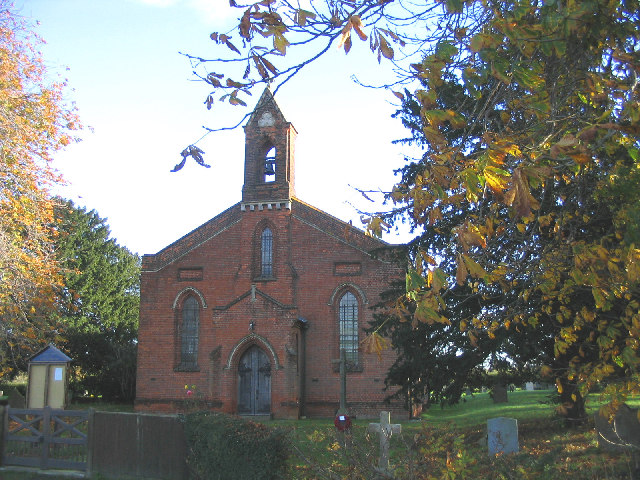
- St Paul's Church

- Location within Essex
- Population: 697 (Parish, 2021)
- Civil parish: Highwood
- District: Chelmsford
- Shire county: Essex
- Region: East
- Country: England
- Sovereign state: United Kingdom
- Post town: CHELMSFORD
- Postcode district: CM1
- UK Parliament: North West Essex

Highwood is a village and civil parish in the Chelmsford district of Essex, England. The village lies 4 miles (6 km) west of the centre of Chelmsford itself. The A414 road passes through the parish, a little way to the north of the village. Loves Green is part of the village. The parish also includes the hamlets of Cooksmill Green and Radley Green to the north of the village and Edney Common to the east. At the 2021 census the parish had a population of 697.

== History ==
The Highwood area historically formed part of the parish of Writtle. The parish of Writtle was historically subdivided into four townships, one of which was called Highwood Quarter. A chapel of ease dedicated to St Paul was built in 1842 on a site at the eastern end of Loves Green and a short distance west of Edney Common, two of the main hamlets in the Highwood Quarter. Highwood became an ecclesiastical parish in 1875 when St Paul's was upgraded to being a parish church.

Highwood subsequently also became a separate civil parish from Writtle in 1954.

== Governance ==
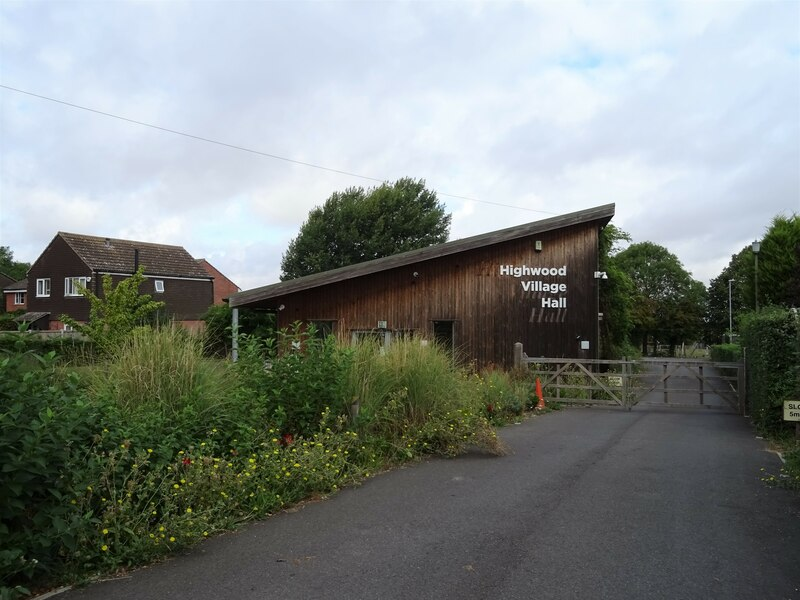
Highwood Village Hall

There are three tiers of local government covering Highwood, at parish, district, and county level: Highwood Parish Council, Chelmsford City Council, and Essex County Council. The parish council meets at Highwood Village Hall.

For national elections, Highwood forms part of the North West Essex constituency.
