= Leaden Roding =

Village in Essex, England

Coordinates: 51.7961°N 0.311188°E

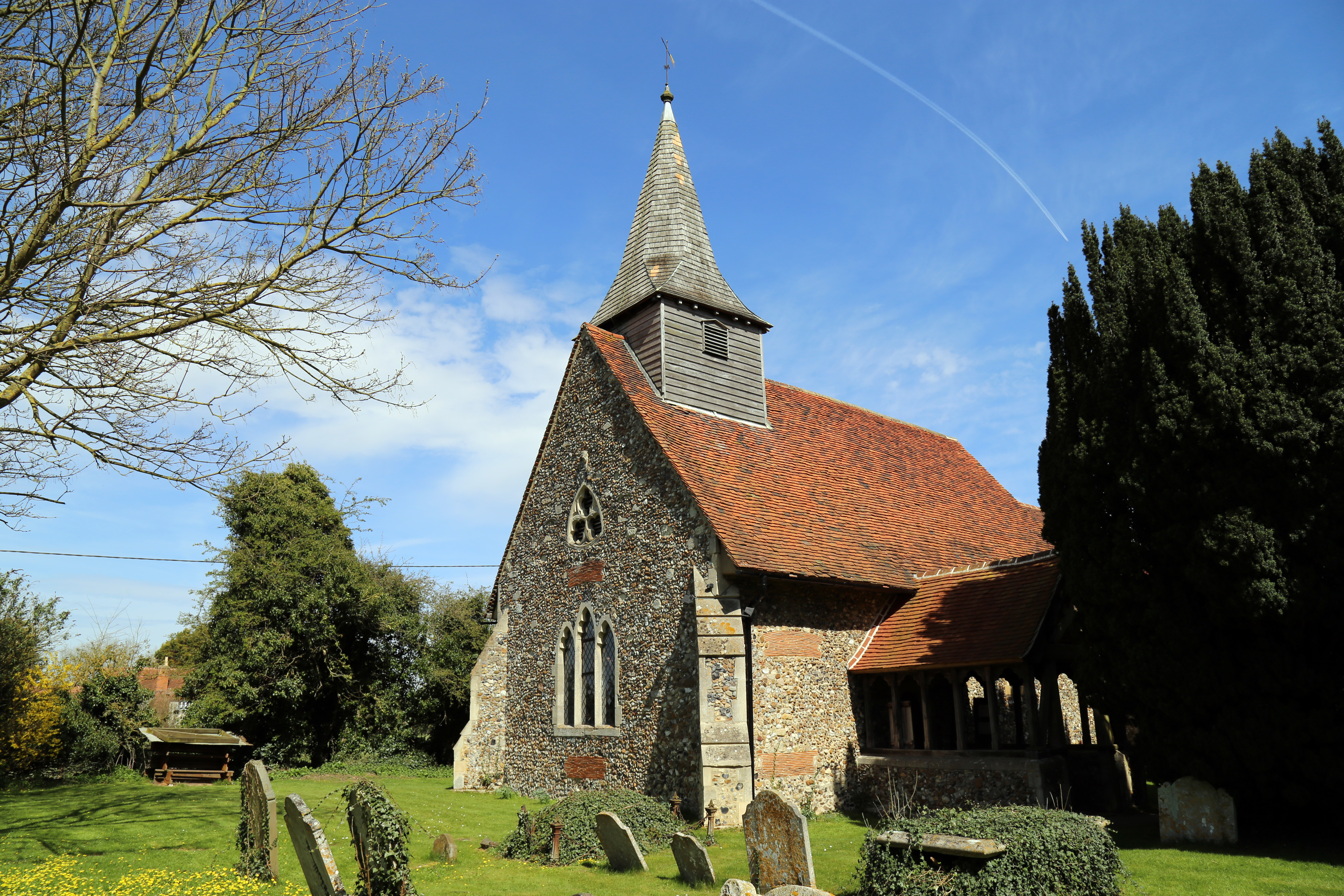
- St Michael's Church, Leaden Roding

- Location within Essex
- Population: 720 (Parish, 2021)
- OS grid reference: TL594133
- Civil parish: Leaden Roding
- District: Uttlesford
- Shire county: Essex
- Region: East
- Country: England
- Sovereign state: United Kingdom
- Post town: Dunmow
- Postcode district: CM6
- Dialling code: 01279
- Police: Essex
- Fire: Essex
- Ambulance: East of England
- UK Parliament: Saffron Walden

Leaden Roding is a village and civil parish in the Uttlesford district of Essex, England. The village is included in the eight hamlets and villages called The Rodings. Leaden Roding is 8 miles (13 km) north-west from the county town of Chelmsford. At the 2021 census the parish had a population of 720.

== History ==
According to A Dictionary of British Place Names, Roding derives from "Rodinges" as is listed in the Domesday Book, with the later variation 'Ledeineroing' recorded in 1248. The 'Leaden' refers to the lead roof of the parish church. Leaden Roding itself is not listed in the Domesday survey. However, William the Conqueror seized The Rodings from Ely after defeating rebels in the Isle of Ely. He gave Leaden-Roding to Geoffrey de Mandeville. The manor was then transferred to William de Warenne, 1st Earl of Surrey. The manor church, called Leaden-Church and its advowson was given by William de Warenne to Castle Acre, his Cluniac priory that he founded in Norfolk in 1090. Castle Acre held Leaden Roding advowson until the Suppression of the Monasteries, when it was given to Henry Bourchier, 2nd Earl of Essex, and next through his daughter Anne Bourchier's marriage, to William Parr, 1st Marquess of Northampton, who then became the Earl of Essex in its seventh creation (1543). The advowson was then transferred to the Luther family, who were still in possession in 1738. Other land in Leaden Roding belonged to Colne Priory, which was given by Henry VIII to his favourite, Charles Brandon, 1st Duke of Suffolk.

Traditional alternative names for the parish and village include Leaden Roothing, Leaden Rooding, Roding Plumb, Rooding Plumboa, and Roding Plumbea, although the parish was contemporaneously referred to with the 'Roding' suffix in trade directories, gazetteers, sources, and in official documents and maps. Today the official parish name is 'Leaden Roding'.

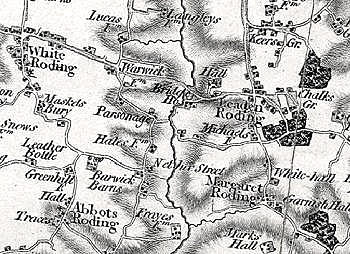
Leaden Roding, Ordnance Survey map 1805

During the 13th-century reign of Henry III, the manor was held by Hugh Blount of the Earl of Arundel family. In the 14th-century reign of Richard II, it was held by John Doreward on behalf of Thomas of Woodstock, 1st Duke of Gloucester. Later the manor was transferred to John Writtyll, and attached to his manor of Mascalsbury (a.k.a. Mascallesbury) in the neighbouring parish of White Roding. In the 16th century, during the reign of Henry VIII, the Waldgrave family held the manor; it was conveyed to John Sherecroft during the reign of Elizabeth I.

The parish was in the Dunmow Hundred, was part of the Rural Deanery of Roding, and, from the 1830s, was in the Dunmow Union – poor relief provision set up under the Poor Law Amendment Act 1834.

In 1848 the lord of the manor was Henry Trevor, Lord Dacre. The 1882 Lordship was held by Captain James Odams while the parish had three principal landowners. From 1894 to 1914, Lordship was held by the trustees of Lord Dacre. Principal landowners in 1914 included Messrs Strutt & Parker. The ecclesiastical parish living was a rectory with residence with 47 acres (0.19 km^{2}) of glebe, being land used for the support of the incumbent, in the 1848 gift and patronage of the Lord Chancellor, Charles Pepys. In 1882 the patronage fell to Roundell Palmer; in 1894 to Farrer Herschell; in 1902 to Hardinge Giffard; and in 1914 to Richard Haldane. The parish church of St Michaels and All Saints was restored in 1866 and contained 100 sittings. The parish register for baptisms and burials dates to 1572, and marriages to 1752. Listed in the 1880s was a Congregational chapel, associated with the chapels at 'Abbotts Roding' and High Easter which conducted the services at Leaden Roding.

By 1848 the parish was entitled to send its children to the D'Oyley's School, at Margaret Roding. In 1882, listings included a Leaden Roding Mixed School with an average attendance of 18. Ten years later this was described as a National School for 35 boys and girls with an average attendance of 27, and after 1902, 50 children with an average attendance of 35. By 1914 the school was a Public Elementary School controlled by Essex Education (Dunmow District) Sub-Committee.

In 1848, parish land area measured 873 acres (3.53 km^{2}) after which it rose to 913 acres (3.69 km^{2}) up to at least 1914. Crops grown at the time were chiefly wheat, barley and beans, on a heavy soil with a clay subsoil. Parish population in 1841 was 171; in 1881, 179; in 1891, 190; in 1901, 177; and in 1911, 175. Within the parish was "a place called 'Leaden Wash', where a turnbridge was made for the convenience carriages and foot passengers crossing the water".

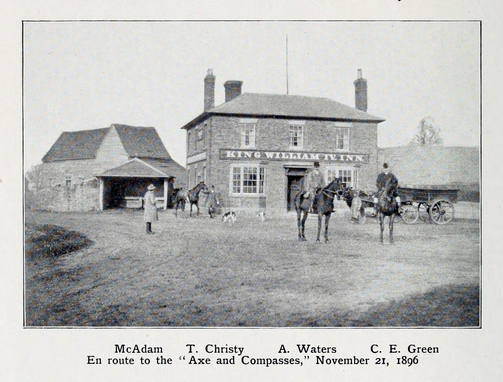
King William IV Inn, in 1900

Parish occupations in 1848 included three farmers, a wheelwright a butcher, a shopkeeper, and the licensee of the King William IV public house. The King William IV, dating to the early 19th century, is listed in all 19th- and 20th-century directories until its closure in the 1990s, and was Grade II listed in 1983. In 1863, the pub licensee was also a shopkeeper. The same year the wheelwright, butcher, and shopkeeper remained, and were joined by a shoemaker and one more farmer. Three farmers were listed in 1874, with previous trades remaining except for the shoemaker, and with further additions of a carpenter, a thatcher, a gardener, and a second shopkeeper who was also a beer retailer. By 1882, a bricklayer and a grocer & draper had joined the others, and one of the farmers was also a beer retailer. In 1894, the carpenter, bricklayer, wheelwright, and shopkeeper & beer retailer remained, although there was only one farmer listed. Added occupations were a farm bailiff and a dress maker, while the grocer & draper was now the Post Office sub-postmaster. Listed in 1902 was the grocer & draper, the beer retailer & shopkeeper, the bricklayer, one farmer, a farm bailiff, two wheelwrights, and the sub-postmaster of the Post, Telegraph & Express Delivery Office. By 1914, the number of farmers had increased again to three, one at a Strutt & Parker farm which employed one of the now two parish farm bailiffs. The grocer & draper and one wheelwright remained. There was extra listing for an assistant overseer, a carrier (to Chelmsford on Mondays and Fridays)—a person who transported trading goods and produce for others, and occasionally people, from place to place, usually by horse and cart—and the Secretary of the Ancient Order of Foresters (Court of Lord Roden No. 5827). There was the sub-postmaster of the Post and Telegraph Office, and a Police Station with constable.

Leaden Roding was a traditional centre for fox hunting. In their 1896 book The Essex Foxhounds, Ball and Gilbey saw Leaden Roding and the King William IV Inn as at the centre of The Rodings, with Leaden Wood (to the southeast of the village) "the most important covert in the district", and the previous property of Lord Dacre.

== Community ==
Leaden Roding parish is in the parliamentary constituency of Saffron Walden, and is part of the High Easter & the Rodings ward of Uttlesford District Council. Civil parish governance is through its own parish council. Leaden Roding is one of The Hundred Parishes, a group of East of England parishes defined by its special heritage characteristics.

Leaden Roding has a village hall, a cricket club, a fire and rescue station, a village store and a garage services company. The local school is Rodings Primary School.
