= Takeley =

Village in Essex, England

Coordinates: 51.868°N 0.266°E

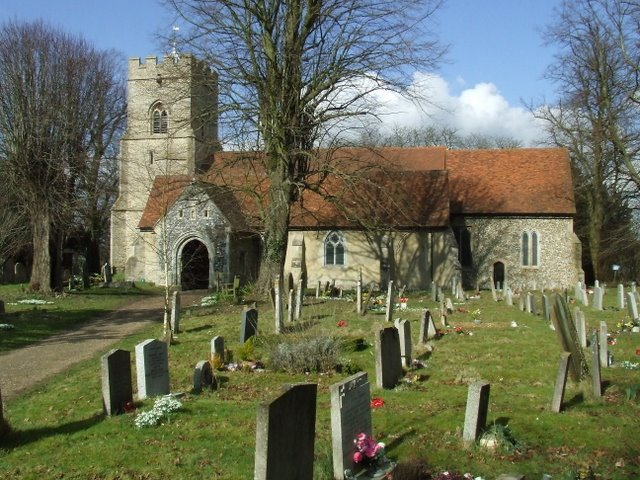
- Holy Trinity Church, Takeley

- Location within Essex
- Population: 5,331 (Parish, 2021)
- OS grid reference: TL561212
  - London: 25 mi (40 km) SW
- Civil parish: Takeley
- District: Uttlesford
- Shire county: Essex
- Region: East
- Country: England
- Sovereign state: United Kingdom
- Post town: Bishop's Stortford
- Postcode district: CM22
- Dialling code: 01279
- Police: Essex
- Fire: Essex
- Ambulance: East of England
- UK Parliament: Saffron Walden

Takeley is a village and civil parish in the Uttlesford district of Essex, England. It lies 4 miles (6 km) east of Bishop's Stortford, its post town, which is over the county boundary in Hertfordshire. The parish includes part of London Stansted Airport within its boundaries.

== History ==
A number of theories have arisen over the origin of the village's name. One believes the village's name was a corruption from the "Teg-Ley" of sheep clearing. Another theory is that Takeley is derived from the Saxon lord Taecca, who owned land in Essex and Oxfordshire, the latter of which has a village named Tackley. In more recent times, Takeley is thought to have derived from "settlement next to open forest" in reference to the Forest of Essex.

When Takeley was first recorded by the Normans in 1086–87 its boundaries were approximately 8 miles (13 km) in length, with a total area of 3,000 acres (12 km^{2}).

Takeley parish church, dating from the 12th century, is dedicated to the Holy Trinity, and was Grade I listed by English Heritage in 1967.

The hamlet of Cooper's End was demolished to make way for the cargo area of Stansted Airport. Cooper's End roundabout was constructed as part of the new airport, and is just west of the terminal. The airport's main passenger facilities, including Stansted Airport railway station, lie within the parish of Takeley.

== Geography ==
The village is situated approximately halfway between Bishop's Stortford and Great Dunmow, and on Stane Street, the Roman road from Braughing to Colchester. The A120 road and Stansted Airport is at the north.

Takeley consists of a number of 'Ends' and 'Greens', namely Brewer's End (John le Brewer, 1327), The Street, Smith's Green, Bamber's Green (Bambrose Green, from the Banbury family at Sheering Hall), Molehill Green (Morrell's Green), and Mill End.

The Office for National Statistics defines a built up area called "Takeley and Little Canfield" which covers Takeley village and extends into the neighbouring parish of Little Canfield. At the 2021 census, this built up area had a population of 5,550. In 2021 the parish had a population of 5,331.

== Governance ==
Takeley is part of the electoral ward of Takeley and the Canfields. The population of the ward at the 2021 census was 7,192.

== Education ==
There was a fee-paying school in the village, the Christian School, set up in 1989; it closed in 2024.

== Sport ==
Takeley has a non-league football club, Takeley Football Club, who play at Station Road. They were members of the Essex Olympian League in 2007–08, and entered the Essex Senior League in 2008–09. The cricket team at Takeley was established c. 1880.

== See also ==
- The Hundred Parishes
