= Uttlesford =

Coordinates: 52.0190°N 0.2367°E

Uttlesford District
- Non-metropolitan district
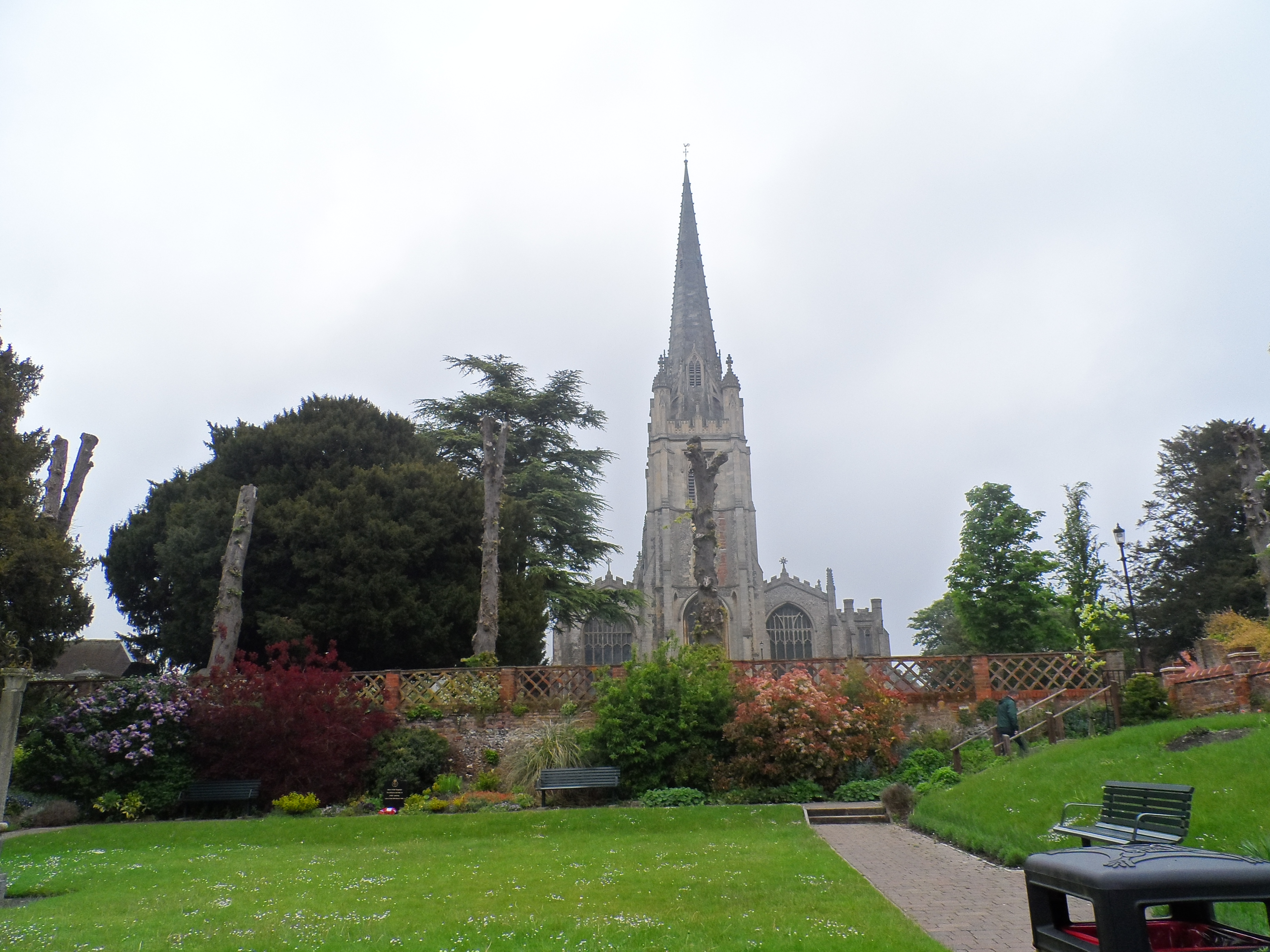
- Saffron Walden, the administrative centre of the district

- Uttlesford shown within Essex
- Sovereign state: United Kingdom
- Constituent country: England
- Region: East of England
- Non-metropolitan county: Essex
- Status: Non-metropolitan district
- Admin HQ: Saffron Walden
- Incorporated: 1 April 1974

Government
  - Type: Non-metropolitan district council
  - Body: Uttlesford District Council
  - Leadership: Alternative - Sec. 31 (Independent)
  - MPs: Kemi Badenoch

Area
  - Total: 247.56 sq mi (641.18 km^{2})
  - Rank: 54th (of 296)

Population (2024)
  - Total: 95,106
  - Rank: 259th (of 296)
  - Density: 384.17/sq mi (148.33/km^{2})

Ethnicity (2021)
  - Ethnic groups: List: 94.5% White; 2.2% Mixed; 1.9% Asian; 0.8% Black; 0.7% other

Religion (2021)
  - Religion: List: 50.2% Christianity; 41.5% no religion; 7.6% other; 0.7% Islam
- Time zone: UTC0 (GMT)
  - Summer (DST): UTC+1 (BST)
- ONS code: 22UQ (ONS); E07000077 (GSS)
- OS grid reference: TL541387

Uttlesford is a local government district in Essex, England. Its council is based in the town of Saffron Walden. The district also includes the town of Great Dunmow and numerous villages, including Stansted Mountfitchet, Takeley, Elsenham, Thaxted, and Newport. The district covers a largely rural area in the north-west of Essex. London Stansted Airport lies within the district.

The neighbouring districts are Braintree, Chelmsford, Epping Forest, East Hertfordshire, North Hertfordshire and South Cambridgeshire.

== History ==
The district was formed on 1 April 1974 under the Local Government Act 1972 as one of 14 districts within Essex. The new district covered the area of three former districts, which were all abolished at the same time:

- Dunmow Rural District
- Saffron Walden Municipal Borough
- Saffron Walden Rural District

The new district was named after the ancient hundred of Uttlesford, which had covered much of the area.

The hundred had been named after a ford on the London Road (now the B1383, formerly the A11) at Wendens Ambo, since replaced by a bridge. The ford appears to derive its name from "Udel's ford". The stream at the ford is sometimes informally called the River Uttle as a back-formation from the name of the ford.

Hundreds gradually lost their functions to other bodies from the seventeenth century onwards, with their final administrative function ceasing in 1886. The name Uttlesford continued to have occasional use in the area between then and 1974, such as the Uttlesford Orchestra, founded in 1956, which played in and around Saffron Walden.

In March 2026, the government announced that it would abolish the district in 2028 as part of local government reform across Essex. These proposals were withdrawn in September 2026.

== Governance ==
Uttlesford District Council

Type
- Type: Non-metropolitan district

History
- Founded: 1 April 1974

Leadership
- Chair: Bianca Donald, R4U since 20 May 2026
- Leader: Petrina Lees, R4U since 7 December 2021
- Chief Executive: Peter Holt since October 2021

Structure
- Seats: 39 councillors
- Political groups: Administration (18) R4U (18) Other parties (21) Conservative (12) Liberal Democrats (3) Reform (3) Independent (3)
- Length of term: Whole council elected every four years

Elections
- Last election: 4 May 2023

Meeting place
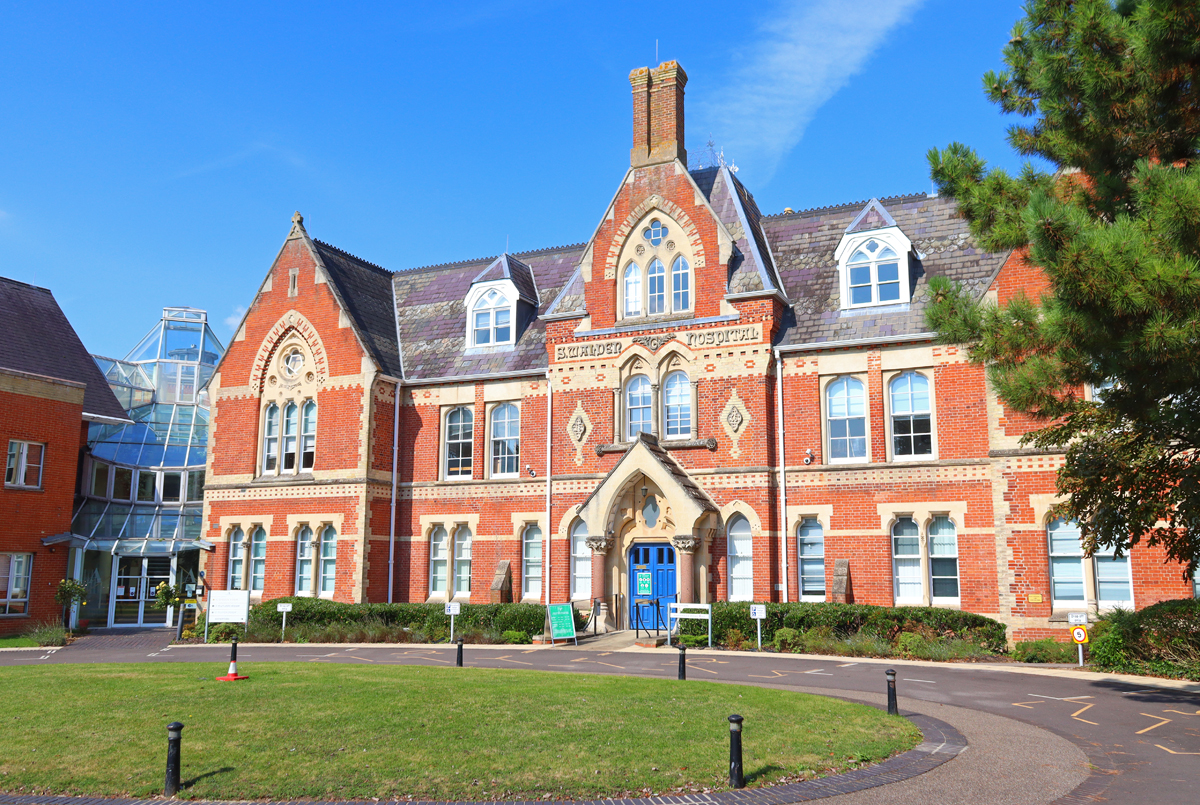
- Council Offices, London Road, Saffron Walden, CB11 4ER

Website
- www.uttlesford.gov.uk

Uttlesford District Council provides district-level services. County-level services are provided by Essex County Council. The whole district is also covered by civil parishes, which form a third tier of local government.

=== Political control ===
The council went under no overall control in May 2026, when changes of allegiance saw local party Residents for Uttlesford (R4U) lose the majority it had held since 2019. R4U remains the largest group and continues to lead the council as a minority administration.

The first election to the council was held in 1973, initially operating as a shadow authority alongside the outgoing authorities until the new arrangements came into effect on 1 April 1974. Political control of the council since 1974 has been as follows:

Party in control	Years
Conservative	1974–1995
No overall control	1995–2003
Liberal Democrats	2003–2007
Conservative	2007–2019
Residents for Uttlesford	2019–2026
No overall control	2026–present

=== Leadership ===
The leaders of the council since 1995 have been:

Councillor	Party	From	To
Robert Chambers	Conservative		16 May 1995
Alan Dean	Liberal Democrats	16 May 1995	13 May 1997
Robert Chambers	Conservative	13 May 1997	May 2003
Alan Dean	Liberal Democrats	20 May 2003	19 Jul 2005
Mark Gayler	Liberal Democrats	19 Jul 2005	May 2007
Jim Ketteridge	Conservative	22 May 2007	15 Jul 2014
Howard Rolfe	Conservative	15 Jul 2014	21 May 2019
John Lodge	Residents for Uttlesford	21 May 2019	7 Dec 2021
Petrina Lees	Residents for Uttlesford	7 Dec 2021	

=== Composition ===
Following the 2023 election, and subsequent changes until July 2026, the composition of the council was:

Party	Councillors
R4U	18
Conservative	12
Liberal Democrats	3
Reform	3
Independent	3
Total	39

=== Premises ===
The council is based at the Council Offices on London Road in Saffron Walden. When the council was created in 1974 it inherited offices at 46 High Street, Dunmow from the Dunmow Rural District Council, at 5 Hill Street, Saffron Walden from Saffron Walden Borough Council and at 52 Debden Road, Saffron Walden from the Saffron Walden Rural District Council. In 1988 the former Saffron Walden General Hospital on London Road closed and the site was bought by the council. The original hospital building of 1865 was renovated and a large extension built to its west to become a new headquarters for the council, which opened in May 1990.

== Elections ==
Since the last full review of boundaries in 2015 the council has comprised 39 councillors representing 22 wards, each electing one, two or three councillors. Elections are held every four years.

== Parishes ==
The district is entirely covered by civil parishes. The parish councils for Great Dunmow and Saffron Walden are styled "town councils". The four parishes of Chickney, Lindsell, Strethall and Wicken Bonhunt have parish meetings rather than parish councils due to their small populations. The two parishes of Elmdon and Wenden Lofts share a parish council called "Elmdon, Duddenhoe End and Wenden Lofts", and the two parishes of Great Easton and Tilty also share a grouped parish council. Great Sampford and Little Sampford share a parish council called "The Sampfords". The parishes are:

- Arkesden
- Ashdon
- Aythorpe Roding
- Barnston
- Berden
- Birchanger
- Broxted
- Chickney
- Chrishall
- Clavering
- Debden
- Elmdon
- Elsenham
- Farnham
- Felsted
- Flitch Green
- Great Canfield
- Great Chesterford
- Great Dunmow (town)
- Great Easton
- Great Hallingbury
- Great Sampford
- Hadstock
- Hatfield Broad Oak
- Hatfield Heath
- Hempstead
- Henham
- High Easter
- High Roding
- Langley
- Leaden Roding
- Lindsell
- Little Bardfield
- Little Canfield
- Little Chesterford
- Little Dunmow
- Little Easton
- Little Hallingbury
- Little Sampford
- Littlebury
- Manuden
- Margaret Roding
- Newport
- Quendon and Rickling
- Radwinter
- Saffron Walden (town)
- Sewards End
- Stansted Mountfitchet
- Stebbing
- Strethall
- Takeley
- Thaxted
- Tilty
- Ugley
- Wenden Lofts
- Wendens Ambo
- White Roding
- Wicken Bonhunt
- Widdington
- Wimbish

== Economy ==
Apart from considerable agriculture, retail and office premises in towns, Uttlesford District includes London Stansted Airport, which is its largest employer. For more detailed analysis of strengths and specializations in the economy see individual settlements, for instance the article: Saffron Walden. In October 2008, the airport won a 40% increase in permitted flights under the flight cap which operates in relation to the airport, from the UK government.

Aside from countryside hotels close to and aircraft maintenance vital to Stansted Airport, airlines have also used a small adjoining business park. Titan Airways has its head office in the Enterprise House in the grounds in Stansted Mountfitchet.

Several airlines, including Buzz, AirUK (later KLM uk), AB Airlines, Go Fly had its head office at the Enterprise House. and Lloyd International Airways had their head offices on the property of Stansted Airport.

== Media ==
=== Television ===
In terms of television, the area is served by BBC East and ITV Anglia broadcasting from the Sudbury and Sandy Heath transmitters. However, some southern parts of the district such as Stansted Mountfitchet and Takeley including Stansted Airport is also served by BBC London and ITV London which broadcast from the Crystal Palace transmitter.

=== Radio ===
Radio stations for the area are:

- BBC Essex
- BBC Radio Cambridgeshire
- BBC Three Counties Radio
- Heart East
- Greatest Hits Radio East
- Star Radio

== Transport ==
=== Rail ===
The West Anglia Main Line passes through Uttlesford. There are stations at:

- Stansted Mountfitchet
- Stansted Airport
- Elsenham
- Newport (Essex)
- Audley End (for Saffron Walden)
- Great Chesterford

From all stations, there are regular services northbound towards Cambridge, operated by Greater Anglia. At certain times, trains continue towards Ely and King's Lynn. CrossCountry also operates northbound trains from Stansted Airport and Audley End to Cambridge, Peterborough, Leicester and Birmingham New Street.

From Stansted Airport, a southbound train is operated towards Bishop's Stortford, Harlow, Tottenham Hale and London Liverpool Street, operated by Greater Anglia under the Stansted Express brand. This train sometimes calls at Stansted Mountfitchet.

Greater Anglia operates southbound trains from other stations in the district to Bishop's Stortford, Harlow, Tottenham Hale and Liverpool Street. A southbound hourly fast-train also calls at Audley End, with additional services at peak times towards London from this station.

=== Road ===
Roads in the district are managed by Essex County Council, with some routes controlled by National Highways.

The M11 motorway between London and Cambridge passes through the district, with junctions at Stansted Airport (junction 8) and Stump Cross, near Saffron Walden (9). This places the district in the M11 corridor for innovation. Northbound from Stump Cross, the A11 forms part of the northern boundary of the district, carrying traffic to Newmarket and Norwich.

The A120 runs east-west through the district between Stansted Airport and Braintree, via Great Dunmow. This connects the district to Hertford, Colchester and Harwich.

Other roads in the district are B-class roads. This includes:

- the B184 - from Stump Cross to the Rodings, via Saffron Walden, Thaxted and Great Dunmow
- the B1383 - from Stump Cross to Bishop's Stortford, via Newport and Stansted Mountfitchet
- the B1008 - from Great Dunmow to the A131 towards Chelmsford

Charity Uttlesford Community Travel provides road transport services to the residents of Uttlesford who find it difficult to access normal public transport: they support the over 60s, the disabled and those who are rurally isolated.

=== Air ===
Stansted Airport is in the district. Stansted is the fourth-busiest UK airport, with flights to over 200 destinations.

=== Bus & Coach ===
There are several bus routes which cross the district and which connect the district to neighbouring destinations, including:

- Bishop's Stortford
- Braintree
- Cambridge
- Chelmsford
- Colchester
- Harlow
- Haverhill
- The Rodings

Great Dunmow and Stansted Airport are on the First Essex and Arriva Shires & Essex networks. First bus 42A calls operates from both destinations to Chelmsford, and X10 and X30 connect Stansted Airport to Chelmsford, Basildon and Southend-on-Sea. Arriva bus 133 connects Stansted and Great Dunmow to Colchester.

Arriva Bus 510 links Stansted Mountfitchet and Stansted Airport to Bishop's Stortford and Harlow.

Saffron Walden is on the Stagecoach Cambridge network, served by the Citi 7, although Megarider tickets are not valid in the district.

Stansted Airport is served by National Express and Airport Bus Express coaches to destinations in London and across the UK.

=== Cycling ===
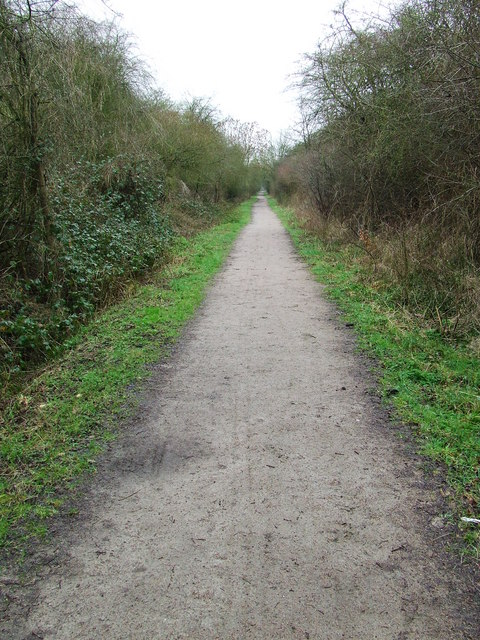
Flitch Way, a bridleway following a dismantled railway which carries NCR 16 in the district.

Several cycle routes cross the district, linking towns in the district to the National Cycle Network.

National Cycle Route 11 (NCR 11) crosses the district north-south, from Ickleton to Stansted Mountfitchet, running mostly on rural lanes. NCR 11 eventually links the district to the River Stort towpath in Bishop's Stortford (towards Harlow, NCR 1 and London). Northbound, the route continues towards Cambridge, Ely and Downham Market. A spur of the route leads into Saffron Walden, running for much of its length on a segregated cycle route.

National Cycle Route 16 runs east-west between Stansted Mountfitchet and Braintree, via Great Dunmow town centre. The route runs for much of its length on segregated cycle track converted from the course of the former Bishop's Stortford to Braintree railway, and it runs unbroken through the district, mostly parallel to the A120.

National Cycle Network 50 runs north-south between Takeley and Quendon in Uttlesford. The route ultimately runs between Quendon and Ulting (near Maldon) running entirely on country lanes.

== Unique features ==
The district is the only British local authority (excluding parishes) to begin with the letter 'u'. The only other initial letter used by only one UK local authority is 'y' for York.

== See also ==
- The Hundred Parishes
