= Braintree District =

Coordinates: 51.8819°N 0.5525°E

- Non-metropolitan district
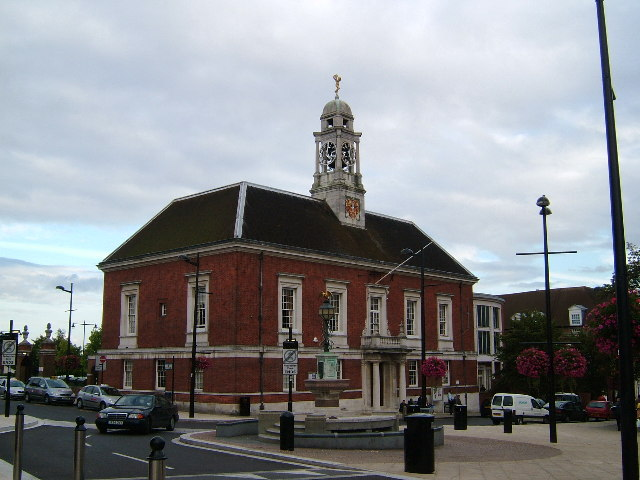
- Braintree. the administrative centre of the district and one of the three towns

- Braintree shown within Essex
- Interactive map of Braintree District
- Sovereign state: United Kingdom
- Country: England
- Region: East of England
- Non-metropolitan county: Essex
- Status: Non-metropolitan district
- Admin HQ: Braintree
- Incorporated: 1 April 1974

Government
  - Type: Non-metropolitan district council
  - Body: Braintree District Council
  - Leadership: Leader & Cabinet (Conservative)
  - MPs: James Cleverly; Priti Patel

Area
  - Total: 236.18 sq mi (611.71 km^{2})
  - Rank: 58th (of 296)

Population (2024)
  - Total: 164,304
  - Rank: 130th (of 296)
  - Density: 695.67/sq mi (268.60/km^{2})

Ethnicity (2021)
  - Ethnic groups: List: 94.7% White; 1.9% Mixed; 1.7% Asian; 1.2% Black; 0.5% other

Religion (2021)
  - Religion: List: 47.1% Christianity; 45% no religion; 7.2% other; 0.7% Islam
- Time zone: UTC0 (GMT)
  - Summer (DST): UTC+1 (BST)
- ONS code: 22UC (ONS); E07000067 (GSS)
- OS grid reference: TL7522

Braintree District is a local government district in Essex, England. The district is named after the town of Braintree, where the council is based. The district also includes the towns of Halstead and Witham and surrounding rural areas.

The neighbouring districts are Colchester, Maldon, Chelmsford, Uttlesford, South Cambridgeshire, West Suffolk, and Babergh.

== History ==
The district was formed on 1 April 1974 under the Local Government Act 1972 as one of 14 districts within Essex. The new district covered the area of five former districts, which were all abolished at the same time:

- Braintree and Bocking Urban District
- Braintree Rural District
- Halstead Rural District
- Halstead Urban District
- Witham Urban District

The new district was named Braintree, after the area's largest town.

Witham was originally planned to be in Maldon district, it was later decided to place it in Braintree district.

In March 2026, the government announced that it would abolish the district in 2028 as part of local government reform across Essex. These proposals were withdrawn in September 2026.

== Governance ==
Braintree District Council

Type
- Type: Non-metropolitan district

History
- Founded: 1 April 1974

Leadership
- Chair: Richard van Dulken, Conservative since 28 May 2026
- Leader: Tom Cunningham, Conservative since 28 May 2026
- Chief Executive: Dan Gascoyne since September 2022

Structure
- Seats: 49 councillors
- Political groups: Administration (29) Conservative (29) Opposition (20) Labour (9) Green (4) Halstead RA (3) Independent (3) Reform (1)
- Length of term: Whole council elected every four years

Elections
- Last election: 4 May 2023
- Next election: 6 May 2027

Meeting place
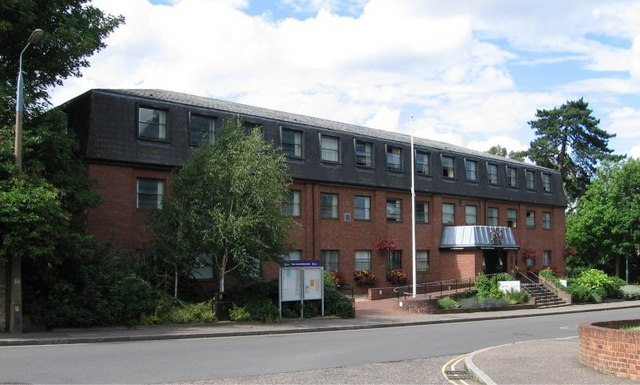
- Causeway House, Bocking End, Braintree, CM7 9HB

Website
- www.braintree.gov.uk

Braintree District Council provides district-level services. County-level services are provided by Essex County Council. Much of the district is also covered by civil parishes, which form a third tier of local government.

=== Political control ===
The council has been under Conservative control since 2007.

The first election to the council was held in 1973, initially operating as a shadow authority alongside the outgoing authorities until the new arrangements came into effect on 1 April 1974. Political control of the council since 1974 has been as follows:

Party in control	Years
No overall control	1974–1976
Conservative	1976–1979
No overall control	1979–1995
Labour	1995–2003
No overall control	2003–2007
Conservative	2007–present

=== Leadership ===
The leaders of the council since 1995 have been:

Councillor	Party	From	To
John Gyford	Labour	1995	9 Oct 2000
Ian Pointon	Labour	9 Oct 2000	May 2003
David Finch	Conservative	21 May 2003	28 Apr 2004
Graham Butland	Conservative	28 Apr 2004	28 May 2026
Tom Cunningham	Conservative	28 May 2026	

=== Composition ===
Following the 2023 election, and a subsequent change of allegiance in February 2025, the composition of the council was:

Party	Councillors
Conservative	29
Labour	9
Green	4
Halstead Residents	3
Independent	3
Total	49

The Greens and seven of the independent councillors sit together as the "Independent and Green Group".

=== Premises ===
The council has its headquarters at Causeway House on Bocking End in Braintree. The building was purpose-built for the council and opened in 1981.

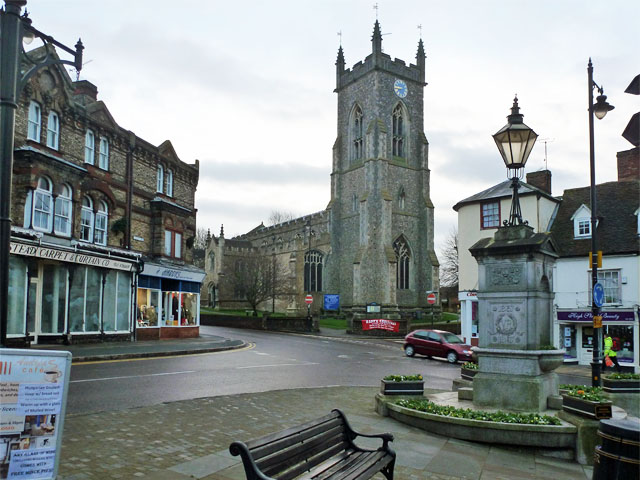
Halstead, one of the three towns of the district

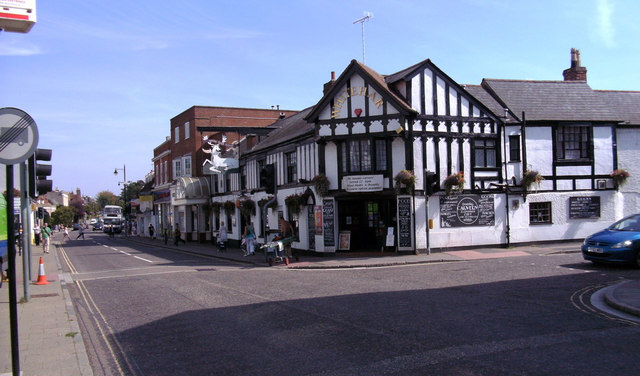
Witham, one of the three towns of the district

== Elections ==
Since the last full review of boundaries in 2015, the council has comprised 49 councillors representing 26 wards, with each ward electing one, two or three councillors. Elections are held every four years.

=== Wards ===
The wards are:

- Bocking Blackwater
- Bocking North
- Bocking South
- Braintree Central & Beckers Green
- Braintree South
- Braintree West
- Bumpstead
- Coggeshall
- Gosfield & Greenstead Green
- Great Notley & Black Notley
- Halstead St Andrew's
- Halstead Trinity
- Hatfield Peverel & Terling
- Hedingham
- Kelvedon & Feering
- Rayne
- Silver End and Cressing
- Stour Valley North
- Stour Valley South
- The Colnes
- Three Fields
- Witham Central
- Witham North
- Witham South
- Witham West
- Yeldham

== Towns and parishes ==
There are 63 civil parishes in the district. The former Braintree and Bocking Urban District, covering the town of Braintree itself, is an unparished area. The parish councils for Halstead and Witham are styled "town councils".

== Arms ==
Coat of arms of Braintree District

Notes
Granted 15 October 1974.
Crest
On a wreath of the colours on a mount Vert in front of a garb Or a boar passant Azure crined and unguled Or supporting with the dexter fore-hoof a Maltese cross Gules.
Escutcheon
Gules a pale Or between two seaxes in pale points upward Argent hilts pommels and quillons Or over all a fess wavy Argent charged with a bar wavy Sable in chief a lion rampant Azure a like lion in base.
Supporters
On either side a lion Sable gorged with a riband Argent pendent therefrom by a ring a mullet Argent surmounted of a pentagon Or fimbriated and charged with a fleur-de-Lys Vert and holding in the month a shuttle erect threaded Proper.
Motto
By Wisdom And Foresight.
Badge
A mullet Argent surmounted of a pentagon Or fimbriated and charged with a fleur-de-Lys Vert.
