= Little Hallingbury =

Village and civil parish in Essex, England

Coordinates: 51°50′10″N 0°10′44″E

- Village and civil parish
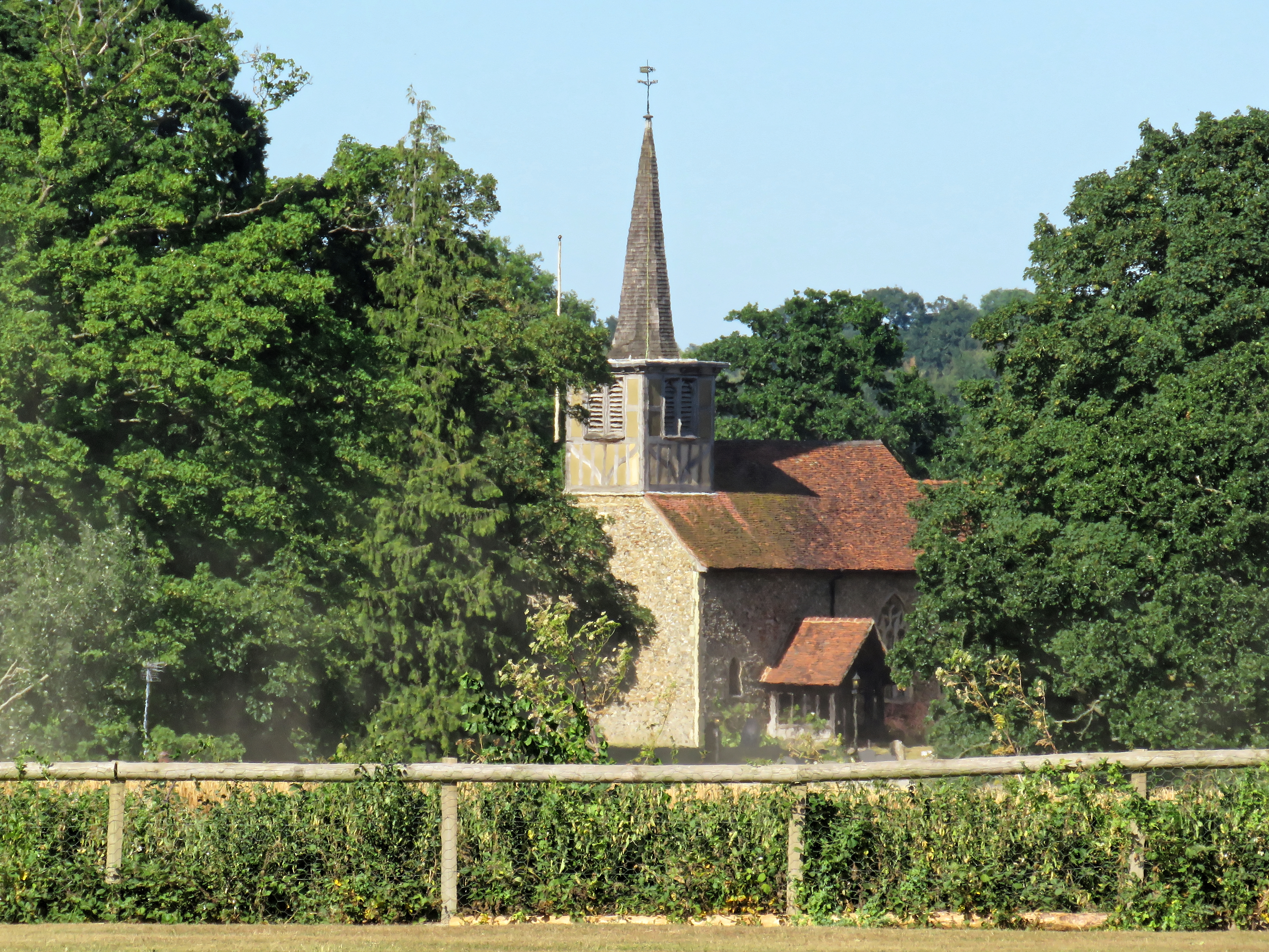

- Location within Essex
- Population: 1,664 (Parish, 2021)
- OS grid reference: TL 50231 17414
- Civil parish: Little Hallingbury
- District: Uttlesford
- Shire county: Essex
- Region: East
- Country: England
- Sovereign state: United Kingdom
- Post town: BISHOP'S STORTFORD
- Postcode district: CM22
- Dialling code: 01279
- Police: Essex
- Fire: Essex
- Ambulance: East of England
- UK Parliament: Harlow

Little Hallingbury is a village and a civil parish in the Uttlesford district of Essex, England. It lies 2 miles (3 km) south of the centre of Bishop's Stortford, its post town, which is over the county boundary in Hertfordshire. At the 2021 census the parish had a population of 1,664.

== Geography ==
Little Hallingbury parish is on a high rise of ground and contains the small settlements of Gaston Green, Wright's Green and Mott's Green to the south of Little Hallingbury village. It is bordered at the west by the River Stort over which are the Hertfordshire parishes of Sawbridgeworth and Thorley. The parish of Hatfield Broad Oak borders the east, Hatfield Heath and Sheering the south, and Great Hallingbury the north. The M11 motorway runs north to south through the parish.

== Community ==
The parish church of St Mary the Virgin on Wright's Green Lane in Wrights Green is a Grade II* listed church dating to the 12th century, with flint rubble, tile and Roman brick walls, and a 19th-century bell turret with an octagonal spire; the associated Church of England voluntary aided primary school is also on Wright's Green Lane. Little Hallingbury village hall is on the A1060 Lower Street in Wright's Green. Further south on Lower Street beyond the M11 is a site with an equestrian centre and a MOT test centre. The George Inn on Latchmore Bank is the village public house, a Grade II listed timber framed and plastered building dating to at least the 17th century.

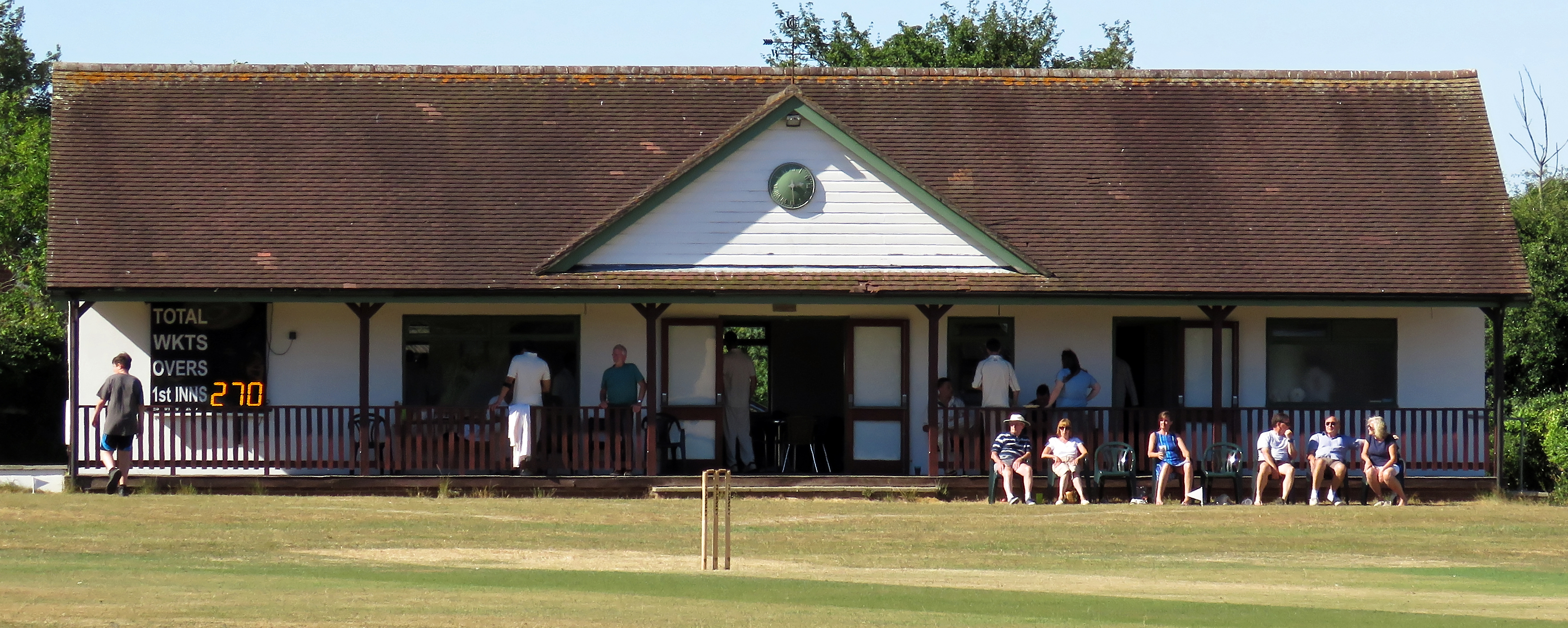
Hallingbury Cricket Club at Gaston Green

Little Hallingbury Cricket Club represents the civil parish of Little Hallingbury, with its home ground at Gaston Green. The club plays in the Herts and Essex League, and fields Saturday, Sunday, mid-week and junior teams.

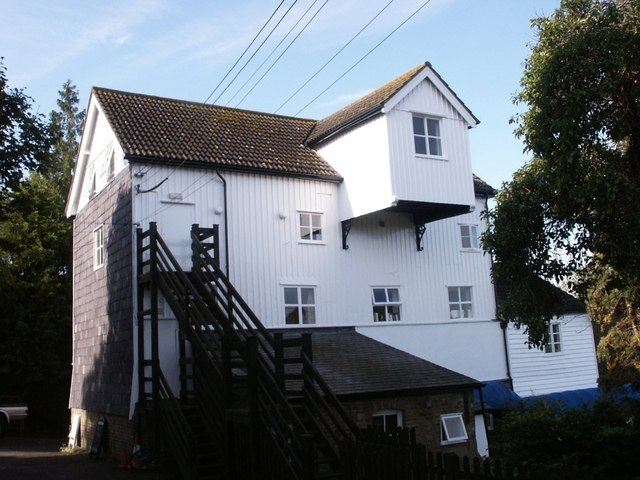
Little Hallingbury Mill

Little Hallingbury Mill, to the west of Gaston Green, is a Grade II* converted watermill, which today is a small hotel and restaurant. The current mill was built in 1874, although there was milling on this site for many years before it was converted to a hotel. Although not in commercial use, the mill machinery is in working condition.

Hatfield Forest in neighbouring Hatfield Broad Oak has been a Royal Hunting Forest from the time of the Norman kings. The forest is open to the public and covers 1,049 acres (4 km^{2}) of woodland, grassland with trees, lake and marsh. Portingbury Hills in Hatfield Forest is suggested to be a defended settlement or farmstead dated to the Iron Age. According to the National Trust "The main rectangular mound is approximately 100 by 70 feet (30 by 21 m) and is surrounded by a ditch 25 to 35 feet wide, with a flat top.".

== See also ==
- The Hundred Parishes
