= Braintree District Council elections =

Local government elections in Essex, England

Braintree District Council in Essex, England is elected every four years. Since the last comprehensive boundary changes in 2015, 49 councillors have been elected from 26 wards.

== Seat history ==
Year	Conservative	Labour	Liberal Democrats	Green	Independent	Others	Council control after election
Local government reorganisation; council established (58 seats)
1973	15	22	3	0	15	3 (Note: 2 Independent Conservatives, 1 Residents Association)	No overall control
1976	39	8	1	0	8	2 (Note: 1 Independent Conservative, 1 Residents Association)	Conservative
New ward boundaries; seats increased from 58 to 60
1983	28	16	3	0	10	3 (Note: 2 Residents Association, 1 Independent Conservative)	No overall control
1987	30	13	5	0	8	4 (Note: 4 Residents Association)	No overall control
1991	23	21	6	0	6	4 (Note: 4 Ratepayers)	No overall control
1995	10	37	6	0	5	2 (Note: 2 Residents Association)	Labour
1999	17	31	3	2	4	3 (Note: 3 Residents Association)	Labour
New ward boundaries
2003	27	20	4	2	2	5 (Note: 5 Halstead Residents)	No overall control
2007	42	9	1	2	2	5 (Note: 5 Halstead Residents)	Conservative
2011	47	9	0	2	1	1 (Note: 1 Halstead Resident)	Conservative
New ward boundaries; seats reduced from 60 to 49
2015	44	2	0	1	0	2 (Note: 2 Halstead Residents)	Conservative
2019	34	2	0	6	3	4 (Note: 4 Halstead Residents)	Conservative
2023	26	9	0	4	7	3 (Note: 3 Halstead Residents)	Conservative

== Council elections ==
- 1973 Braintree District Council election
- 1976 Braintree District Council election
- 1979 Braintree District Council election (New ward boundaries)
- 1983 Braintree District Council election
- 1987 Braintree District Council election (District boundary changes took place but the number of seats remained the same)
- 1991 Braintree District Council election (District boundary changes took place but the number of seats remained the same)
- 1995 Braintree District Council election
- 1999 Braintree District Council election
- 2003 Braintree District Council election (New ward boundaries)
- 2007 Braintree District Council election
- 2011 Braintree District Council election
- 2015 Braintree District Council election (New ward boundaries)
- 2019 Braintree District Council election (Ward boundary changes took place but the number of seats remained the same)
- 2023 Braintree District Council election

== Maps ==
1979 results map

1983 results map

1987 results map

1991 results map

1995 results map

1999 results map

2003 results map

2007 results map

2011 results map

2015 results map

2019 results map

2023 results map

== By-election results ==
A by-election occurs when seats become vacant between council elections. Below is a summary of by-elections from 1983 onwards. Full by-election results are listed under the last regular election preceding the by-election and can be found by clicking on the ward name.

=== 1983-1994 ===
Ward	Date	Incumbent party	Winning party
Coggeshall	8 September 1983	Conservative	Conservative
Kelvedon	10 November 1983	Conservative	Conservative
Black Notley	3 March 1984	Conservative	Alliance
Yeldham	13 December 1984	Conservative	Alliance
Castle Hedingham	27 June 1985	Conservative	Alliance
Witham West	27 February 1986	Conservative	Labour
Hatfield Peverel	16 October 1986	Independent	Conservative
Halstead St Andrew's	3 March 1988	Independent	Conservative
Witham Chipping Hill	21 April 1988	Conservative	Labour
Gosfield	9 June 1988	Independent	Conservative
Colne Engaine & Greenstead Green	3 November 1988	Conservative	Conservative
Sible Hedingham	15 December 1988	Independent	SLD
Halstead St Andrew's	13 July 1989	Conservative	Labour
Kelvedon	1 March 1990	Conservative	Labour
Earls Colne	5 December 1991	Independent	Conservative
Castle Hedingham	6 October 1994	Liberal Democrats	Conservative

=== 1995-2006 ===
Ward	Date	Incumbent party	Winning party
Braintree Central	7 March 1996	Labour	Labour
Braintree Central	31 July 1997	Labour	Labour
Braintree East	10 February 2000	Labour	Labour
Braintree Central	10 February 2000	Labour	Labour
Castle Hedingham	29 June 2000	Conservative	Conservative
Braintree Central	6 July 2000	Labour	Labour
Braintree West	31 January 2002	Labour	Labour
Hedingham & Maplestead	11 March 2004	Conservative	Liberal Democrats
Rayne	14 October 2004	Liberal Democrats	Conservative

=== 2007-2018 ===
Ward	Date	Incumbent party	Winning party
Hatfield Peverel	16 June 2008	Conservative	Conservative
Braintree East	19 June 2008	Conservative	Conservative
Witham West	2 October 2008	Conservative	Conservative
The Three Colnes	4 December 2008	Conservative	Conservative
Braintree South	24 June 2010	Conservative	Conservative
Great Notley & Braintree West	15 March 2012	Conservative	Conservative
Braintree East	15 March 2012	Conservative	Labour
Braintree South	15 March 2012	Conservative	Labour
Braintree East	25 July 2013	Labour	Labour
Witham South	5 May 2016	Conservative	Conservative
Bumpstead	20 October 2016	Conservative	Conservative
Witham North	20 October 2016	Conservative	Labour
Bocking North	3 May 2018	Conservative	Labour
Hatfield Peverel & Terling	3 May 2018	Conservative	Conservative

=== 2019-2023 ===
Ward	Date	Incumbent party	Winning party
Hatfield Peverel & Terling	6 May 2021	Conservative	Conservative
Witham South	6 May 2021	Conservative	Conservative
Braintree South	10 November 2022	Conservative	Labour
Coggeshall	10 November 2022	Independent	Independent

=== 2023-2027 ===
Ward	Date	Incumbent party	Winning party
Coggeshall	5 March 2026	Independent	Reform
