= 2007 Braintree District Council election =

English local election

← 2003	3 May 2007	2011 →

60 seats to Braintree District Council 31 seats needed for a majority

	First party	Second party	Third party
Party	Conservative	Labour	Halstead Residents
Last election	27 seats, 35.7%	20 seats, 33.6%	5 seats, 6.7%
Seats won	42	9	5
Seat change	▲15	▼11	Steady
Popular vote	39,088	21,847	3,747
Percentage	50.3%	28.1%	4.8%
Swing	▲14.6%	▼5.5%	▼1.9%
	Fourth party	Fifth party	Sixth party
Party	Green	Liberal Democrats	Independent
Last election	2 seats, 6.0%	4 seats, 12.5%	2 seats, 5.4%
Seats won	2	1	1
Seat change	Steady	▼3	▼1
Popular vote	4,359	5,584	1,786
Percentage	5.6%	7.2%	2.3%
Swing	▼0.4%	▼5.3%	▼3.1%
Council control before election
No overall control
Council control after election
Conservative

The 2007 Braintree District Council election took place on 3 May 2007 to elect members of Braintree District Council in England. This was on the same day as other local elections.

== Results summary ==
2007 Braintree District Council election
Party	Seats	Gains	Losses	Net gain/loss	Seats %	Votes %	Votes	+/−
Conservative	42	15	0	▲15	70.0	50.3	39,088	+14.6
Labour	9	0	11	▼11	15.0	28.1	21,847	-5.5
Halstead Residents	5	0	0	Steady	8.3	4.8	3,747	-1.9
Green	2	0	0	Steady	3.3	5.6	4,359	-0.4
Liberal Democrats	1	0	3	▼3	1.7	7.2	5,584	-5.3
Independent	1	0	1	▼1	1.7	2.3	1,786	-3.1
English Democrat	0	0	0	Steady	0.0	1.2	917	N/A
UKIP	0	0	0	Steady	0.0	0.6	453	N/A

== Ward results ==
=== Black Notley and Terling ===
Black Notley and Terling
Party	Candidate	Votes	%	±%
Conservative	Margaret Galione	805	65.3	+26.3
Conservative	Andrew Meyer	752	61.0	+31.6
Labour	Juliet Walton	192	15.6	−0.1
Labour	Tony Bennett	165	13.4	+1.6
Liberal Democrats	Anthony Weaver	159	12.9	−26.4
Green	Joyce Wells	133	10.8	N/A
Turnout		1,232	41.2	−2.8
Conservative gain from Liberal Democrats				
Conservative hold				

=== Bocking Blackwater ===
Bocking Blackwater
Party	Candidate	Votes	%	±%
Conservative	David Reid	1,099	55.3	+12.2
Conservative	Wendy Schmitt	1,099	55.3	+11.0
Conservative	Liz Edey	1,065	53.5	+11.1
Liberal Democrats	Terry Brooks	634	31.9	+12.5
Labour	Richard Green	474	23.8	−15.3
Labour	Richard Parsons	452	22.7	−11.9
Labour	Michael Coughlan	338	17.0	−14.9
Turnout		1,989	34.0	+6.2
Conservative hold				
Conservative hold				
Conservative hold				

=== Bocking North ===
Bocking North
Party	Candidate	Votes	%	±%
Labour	David Mann	573	46.7	−7.4
Labour	Tony Everard	547	44.6	−4.5
Conservative	Vanessa Santomauro	426	34.7	+2.0
Conservative	Jennifer Smith	374	30.5	+0.5
UKIP	Michael Ford	187	15.3	N/A
Liberal Democrats	Eileen Fierheller	131	10.7	−6.2
Turnout		1,226	38.0	+10.5
Labour hold				
Labour hold				

=== Bocking South ===
Bocking South
Party	Candidate	Votes	%	±%
Conservative	John Baugh	619	47.2	+15.0
Labour	Moia Thorogood	551	42.0	−16.1
Conservative	Stephen Sandbrook	538	41.0	+16.9
Labour	Lynn Watson	534	40.7	−20.6
Liberal Democrats	Peter Braley	141	10.7	N/A
Turnout		1,312	33.2	+8.6
Conservative gain from Labour				
Labour hold				

=== Bradwell, Silver End and Rivenhall ===
Bradwell, Silver End and Rivenhall
Party	Candidate	Votes	%	±%
Green	James Abbott	895	75.2	+17.1
Green	Philip Hughes	865	72.7	+21.2
Labour	Greta Tew	258	21.7	−7.9
Labour	Tony Tearle	229	19.2	−8.0
Turnout		1,190	34.0	−6.2
Green hold				
Green hold				

=== Braintree Central ===
Braintree Central
Party	Candidate	Votes	%	±%
Conservative	John McKee	1,042	52.1	+18.6
Conservative	Trevor McArdle	999	49.9	+16.4
Conservative	Lene Shepherd	970	48.5	N/A
Labour	Agnes Bishop	573	28.6	−5.3
Labour	Martin Green	529	26.4	−9.3
Labour	Bill Edwards	492	24.6	−10.4
Liberal Democrats	Pauline Brooks	423	21.1	−15.5
Green	Rachel Brunton	321	16.0	+6.0
Turnout		2,001	35.6	+10.6
Conservative gain from Liberal Democrats				
Conservative gain from Labour				
Conservative gain from Labour				

=== Braintree East ===
Braintree East
Party	Candidate	Votes	%	±%
Labour	Elwyn Bishop	581	39.4	−12.6
Conservative	Caroline Denise	546	37.0	+10.5
Labour	Eric Lynch	541	36.7	−9.6
Labour	Eileen Davidson	516	35.0	−8.7
Conservative	Nigel Edey	507	34.4	N/A
Conservative	David Messer	483	32.8	N/A
UKIP	Philip Shute	266	18.0	N/A
Liberal Democrats	Paul Lemon	247	16.8	−2.3
Liberal Democrats	Keith Miller	244	16.6	−2.2
Turnout		1,474	31.3	+5.6
Labour hold				
Conservative gain from Labour				
Labour hold				

=== Braintree South ===
Braintree South
Party	Candidate	Votes	%	±%
Liberal Democrats	Doug Rice	673	39.4	−1.0
Conservative	Russell Wilkins	607	35.5	+7.1
Labour	Michael Lynch	582	34.1	−12.7
Conservative	David Finch	529	31.0	+5.2
Labour	Gordon Currie	518	30.3	−9.5
Conservative	David Morse	498	29.1	N/A
Labour	Allan Millam	474	27.7	−15.4
Green	Dawn Holmes	259	15.2	+0.9
English Democrat	Albert Da	247	14.5	N/A
Turnout		1,709	34.2	+8.3
Liberal Democrats hold				
Conservative gain from Labour				
Labour hold				

=== Bumpstead ===
Bumpstead
Party	Candidate	Votes	%	±%
Conservative	John Collar	515	62.2	−8.8
Labour	Steven Trumm	313	37.8	+8.8
Majority		202	24.4	−17.6
Turnout		828	43.0	+3.3
Conservative hold		Swing	▼8.8	

=== Coggeshall and North Feering ===
Coggeshall and North Feering
Party	Candidate	Votes	%	±%
Conservative	Patricia Newton	1,134	68.9	+20.7
Conservative	Malcolm Dunn	1,045	63.4	+17.0
Labour	Robert Alston	536	32.5	−5.1
Labour	Cathie Joyce	513	31.1	−9.1
Turnout		1,647	42.4	+1.4
Conservative hold				
Conservative hold				

=== Cressing and Stisted ===
Cressing and Stisted
Party	Candidate	Votes	%	±%
Independent	Lynette Flint	564	82.5	+26.6
Labour	Michael Shirvington	120	17.5	N/A
Majority		444	65.0	+53.2
Turnout		684	40.8	+12.8
Independent hold		Swing	N/A	

=== Gosfield and Greenstead Green ===
Gosfield and Greenstead Green
Party	Candidate	Votes	%	±%
Conservative	John O'Reilly-Cicconi	638	74.6	+19.5
Labour	Maureen Bennett	217	25.4	+11.1
Majority		421	49.2	+24.6
Turnout		855	44.7	−3.3
Conservative hold		Swing	▲4.2	

=== Great Notley and Braintree West ===
Great Notley and Braintree West
Party	Candidate	Votes	%	±%
Conservative	Graham Butland	1,158	72.3	+11.9
Conservative	Claire Sandbrook	1,129	70.5	+14.9
Conservative	Roger Walters	1,010	63.0	+9.3
Liberal Democrats	David Rice	284	17.7	−6.2
Independent	Tony Watts	203	12.7	−0.7
Labour	Richard Tincknell	184	11.5	−0.3
Labour	Steven Goodfellow	148	9.2	−1.9
Labour	Daniel Ezra	132	8.2	−1.7
Turnout		1,602	32.0	−0.1
Conservative hold				
Conservative hold				
Conservative hold				

=== Halstead St. Andrew's ===
Halstead St. Andrew's
Party	Candidate	Votes	%	±%
Halstead Residents	David Hume	949	58.6	−10.8
Halstead Residents	Beryl Gage	911	56.2	−13.8
Halstead Residents	Michael Gage	822	50.7	−19.6
English Democrat	Raymond Brown	564	34.8	N/A
Labour	Grahame McCoyd	398	24.6	−0.8
Labour	Adrian Axtell	397	24.5	−0.6
Labour	Nancy Freeman	358	22.1	−1.2
Turnout		1,620	31.4	+2.9
Halstead Residents hold				
Halstead Residents hold				
Halstead Residents hold				

=== Halstead Trinity ===
Halstead Trinity
Party	Candidate	Votes	%	±%
Halstead Residents	Jacqueline Pell	604	61.4	−15.9
Halstead Residents	Howard Messenger	461	46.9	−10.7
Labour	Malcolm Fincken	357	36.3	+2.2
Labour	Stuart Gilbert	291	29.6	−2.8
Turnout		983	28.4	−1.6
Halstead Residents hold				
Halstead Residents hold				

=== Hatfield Peveral ===
Hatfield Peveral
Party	Candidate	Votes	%	±%
Conservative	David Bebb	1,006	78.0	+12.9
Conservative	Keith Bigden	987	76.6	−0.1
Labour	Carole Hine	283	22.0	−2.5
Labour	Neil Coughlan	187	14.5	−6.9
Turnout		1,289	38.6	+8.1
Conservative hold				
Conservative hold				

=== Hedingham and Maplestead ===
Hedingham and Maplestead
Party	Candidate	Votes	%	±%
Conservative	Jo Beavis	1,283	65.3	+3.5
Conservative	Wendy Scattergood	1,114	56.7	+13.4
Conservative	Fred Swallow	1,103	56.1	−0.2
Liberal Democrats	Steve Bolter	726	36.9	+3.9
Labour	Ted Snarey	326	16.6	+0.8
Labour	John Kotz	236	12.0	−0.1
Labour	Noel Owen	224	11.4	−8.8
Turnout		1,966	40.0	+7.1
Conservative hold				
Conservative hold				
Conservative hold				

=== Kelvedon ===
Kelvedon
Party	Candidate	Votes	%	±%
Conservative	Thomas Foster	881	52.8	+10.9
Conservative	Robert Mitchell	845	50.7	+13.2
Labour	Ian Marshall	432	25.9	−7.2
Labour	Terrence Lazell	335	20.1	−13.8
Green	Cheryl Gerrard	278	16.7	N/A
Turnout		1,668	43.7	−1.3
Conservative hold				
Conservative hold				

=== Panfield ===
Panfield
Party	Candidate	Votes	%	±%
Conservative	Tim Wilkinson	630	80.5	+9.7
Labour	Carl May-Smith	153	19.5	−9.7
Majority		477	61.0	+19.4
Turnout		783	47.8	+11.8
Conservative hold		Swing	▲9.7	

=== Rayne ===
Rayne
Party	Candidate	Votes	%	±%
Conservative	Mike Banthorpe	399	58.9	+9.7
Liberal Democrats	Lesley Beckett	121	17.9	−32.9
English Democrat	Colin Morris	106	15.7	N/A
Labour	Ken Tew	51	7.5	N/A
Majority		278	41.0	N/A
Turnout		677	41.5	−1.7
Conservative gain from Liberal Democrats		Swing	▲21.3	

=== Stour Valley North ===
Stour Valley North
Party	Candidate	Votes	%	±%
Conservative	Nigel Harley	650	77.8	+15.1
Labour	Betty Kotz	186	22.2	+4.0
Majority		464	55.6	+12.0
Turnout		836	50.4	+9.2
Conservative hold		Swing	▲5.6	

=== Stour Valley South ===
Stour Valley South
Party	Candidate	Votes	%	±%
Conservative	Tony Shelton	555	64.5	−8.6
Liberal Democrats	Alan Crowe	245	28.5	N/A
Labour	Fred Hearn	60	7.0	−19.9
Majority		310	36.0	−10.2
Turnout		860	51.0	+14.0
Conservative hold		Swing	N/A	

=== The Three Colnes ===
The Three Colnes
Party	Candidate	Votes	%	±%
Conservative	Rosemary O'Shea	752	50.4	N/A
Conservative	Gabrielle Spray	686	46.0	−7.6
Independent	Bernard Gaught	532	35.7	−24.6
Independent	Jim Bond	487	32.6	N/A
Labour	Dais Marshall	148	9.9	−15.7
Labour	Holly Barlow	146	9.8	−15.0
Turnout		1,492	38.3	+6.1
Conservative gain from Independent				
Conservative hold				

=== Three Fields ===
Three Fields
Party	Candidate	Votes	%	±%
Conservative	John Finbow	1,066	78.6	+6.4
Conservative	Simon Walsh	1,029	75.9	+5.2
Labour	Corinne Green	226	16.7	−4.1
Labour	Miles Scrivens	204	15.0	−4.9
Turnout		1,356	44.3	+7.8
Conservative hold				
Conservative hold				

=== Upper Colne ===
Upper Colne
Party	Candidate	Votes	%	±%
Conservative	Robert Bolton	579	83.1	+16.1
Labour	Peter Long	118	16.9	+3.5
Majority		697	66.2	+18.8
Turnout		697	42.0	+8.0
Conservative hold		Swing	▲6.3	

=== Witham Chipping Hill and Central ===
Witham Chipping Hill and Central
Party	Candidate	Votes	%	±%
Conservative	Michael Lager	609	43.7	+6.9
Conservative	Sandra Howell	593	42.6	N/A
Labour	Phil Barlow	517	37.1	+0.3
Labour	Cynthia Woodhouse	390	28.0	−2.9
Liberal Democrats	Pamela Hooper	250	17.9	−12.2
Green	Nelson Brunton	228	16.4	−4.8
Turnout		1,393	40.5	+7.5
Conservative gain from Labour				
Conservative hold				

=== Witham North ===
Witham North
Party	Candidate	Votes	%	±%
Labour	Bob Evans	507	46.4	−9.1
Labour	John Gyford	453	41.5	−10.8
Conservative	Patricia Lee	406	37.2	+11.4
Conservative	Paula Cohen	376	34.4	N/A
Green	Nicholas Scales	225	20.6	+4.0
Turnout		1,092	32.0	+9.2
Labour hold				
Labour hold				

=== Witham South ===
Witham South
Party	Candidate	Votes	%	±%
Conservative	Janet Money	829	46.7	+8.1
Conservative	Ron Ramage	794	44.7	+7.4
Conservative	John Elliott	771	43.4	+8.3
Labour	Paul Heath	588	33.1	−9.9
Labour	Jacqueline Martin	587	33.0	−10.7
Labour	Wayne Tearle	580	32.6	−6.4
Green	Patricia Brunton	296	16.7	+3.4
Liberal Democrats	Bernard Dearlove	257	14.5	−1.9
Green	Stephanie Bills	239	13.4	N/A
Turnout		1,777	30.9	+3.1
Conservative gain from Labour				
Conservative gain from Labour				
Conservative gain from Labour				

=== Witham West ===
Witham West
Party	Candidate	Votes	%	±%
Conservative	Stephen Lambourne	864	49.0	+15.3
Conservative	Bill Rose	636	36.1	N/A
Labour	Lucy Barlow	584	33.1	−9.1
Labour	Kathie Tearle	561	31.8	−11.4
Labour	Kerin Boylan	539	30.6	−14.1
Liberal Democrats	Joy Reekie	367	20.8	−2.5
Green	Stephen Hicks	357	20.2	−4.7
Liberal Democrats	Barry Fleet	341	19.3	N/A
Liberal Democrats	Helen Waring	341	19.3	N/A
Green	Wendy Partridge	263	14.9	−8.6
Turnout		1,764	35.4	+10.6
Conservative gain from Labour				
Conservative gain from Labour				
Labour hold				

=== Yeldham ===
Yeldham
Party	Candidate	Votes	%	±%
Conservative	Nigel McCrea	373	72.6	+30.1
Labour	David Green	141	27.4	−1.8
Majority		232	45.2	+31.9
Turnout		514	33.5	−3.0
Conservative hold		Swing	▲16.0	

== By-elections ==
=== Braintree East ===
Braintree East: 9 June 2008
Party	Candidate	Votes	%	±%
Conservative		668	50.7	+17.4
Labour		406	30.8	−4.6
Green		125	9.5	N/A
Liberal Democrats		119	9.0	−6.1
Majority		262	19.9	
Turnout		1,318		
Conservative hold		Swing	▲11.0	

=== Hatfield Peveral ===
Hatfield Peveral: 9 June 2008
Party	Candidate	Votes	%	±%
Conservative		782	78.1	+0.1
Labour		138	13.8	−8.2
Green		81	8.1	N/A
Majority		644	64.3	+8.3
Turnout		1,001		
Conservative hold		Swing	▲4.2	

=== Witham West ===
Witham West: 2 October 2008
Party	Candidate	Votes	%	±%
Conservative		508	40.9	+1.1
Labour		373	30.1	+3.2
Liberal Democrats		182	14.7	−2.2
Green		178	14.3	−2.1
Majority		135	10.8	N/A
Turnout		1,241		
Conservative hold		Swing	▼1.1	

=== The Three Colnes ===
The Three Colnes: 4 December 2008
Party	Candidate	Votes	%	±%
Conservative		647	77.0	+24.5
Labour		121	14.4	+4.1
Green		72	8.6	N/A
Majority		526	62.6	N/A
Turnout		840		
Conservative hold		Swing	▲10.2	

=== Braintree South ===
A by-election was called due to the disqualification of Cllr Russell Wilkins (Conservative) for non-attendance.

Braintree South: 24 June 2010
Party	Candidate	Votes	%	±%
Conservative	Abi Olumbori	351	33.0	+7.4
Labour	Gordon Currie	316	29.7	+5.1
Liberal Democrats	David Toombs	216	20.3	−8.1
Independent	Andy Beatty	138	13.0	N/A
Green	Wendy Partridge	44	4.1	−6.8
Majority		35	3.3	N/A
Turnout		1,065		
Conservative hold		Swing	▲1.2	
