= 2015 Braintree District Council election =

Local election held in the United Kingdom

| ← 2011 | 7 May 2015 | 2019 → |

All 49 seats to Braintree District Council 25 seats needed for a majority
| | First party | Second party | Third party |
|---|---|---|---|
| Party | Conservative | Labour | Halstead Residents |
| Last election | 47 | 9 | 1 |
| Seats before | 47 | 9 | 1 |
| Seats won | 44 | 2 | 2 |
| Seat change | ▼3 | ▼7 | ▲1 |
| Popular vote | 37,922 | 15,974 | 2,458 |
| Percentage | 47.2% | 19.9% | 3.1% |
| Swing | ▼2.7% | ▼7.5% | ▲0.5% |
| | Fourth party | Fifth party | Sixth party |
| Party | Green | UKIP | Liberal Democrats |
| Last election | 2 | 0 | 0 |
| Seats before | 2 | 0 | 0 |
| Seats won | 1 | 0 | 0 |
| Seat change | ▼1 | Steady | Steady |
| Popular vote | 9,082 | 12,470 | 2,125 |
| Percentage | 11.3% | 15.5% | 2.6% |
| Swing | ▲0.2% | ▲12.6% | ▼0.9% |
- Map showing the results of the 2015 Braintree District Council election
Leader before election
Graham Butland
Conservative
Leader after election
Graham Butland
Conservative

The 2015 Braintree District Council election was scheduled to take place on 7 May 2015 to elect members of Braintree District Council in England. This was on the same day as other local elections.

Following a boundary change, the number of wards was reduced from 30 to 26 and the number of councillors from 60 to 49.

== Summary ==
=== Results ===
Braintree District Council Election Result 2015
| Party | Seats | Gains | Losses | Net gain/loss | Seats % | Votes % | Votes | +/− |
|---|---|---|---|---|---|---|---|---|
| Conservative | 44 | 0 | 3 | ▼3 | 89.8 | 47.2 | 37,922 | -1.7 |
| Labour | 2 | 0 | 7 | ▼7 | 4.1 | 19.9 | 15,974 | -7.5 |
| Halstead Residents | 2 | 1 | 0 | ▲1 | 4.1 | 3.1 | 2,458 | +0.5 |
| Green | 1 | 0 | 1 | ▼1 | 2.0 | 11.3 | 9,082 | +0.2 |
| UKIP | 0 | 0 | 0 | Steady | 0.0 | 15.5 | 12,470 | +12.6 |
| Liberal Democrats | 0 | 0 | 0 | Steady | 0.0 | 2.6 | 2,125 | -0.9 |
| Independent | 0 | 0 | 1 | ▼1 | 0.0 | 0.4 | 289 | -2.9 |

== Ward results ==
=== Bocking Blackwater ===
Bocking Blackwater
| Party | Candidate | Votes | % | ±% |
|---|---|---|---|---|
| Conservative | Stephen Canning | 2,575 | 52.2 | +2.4 |
| Conservative | Jean Schmitt | 1,702 | 34.5 | −8.2 |
| Conservative | Lyn Walters | 1,560 | 31.6 | −8.6 |
| Labour | Richard Green | 880 | 17.8 | −14.3 |
| Labour | Merle Morris | 727 | 14.7 | −10.4 |
| Labour | Richard Parsons | 658 | 13.3 | −11.8 |
| Liberal Democrats | Paul Lemon | 502 | 10.2 | N/A |
| Green | John Malam | 443 | 9.0 | −4.5 |
| Turnout | | 4,936 | 65.9 | +24.7 |
| Conservative hold | | | | |
| Conservative hold | | | | |
| Conservative hold | | | | |

=== Bocking North ===
Bocking North
| Party | Candidate | Votes | % | ±% |
|---|---|---|---|---|
| Conservative | Stephanie Paul | 1,093 | 40.1 | +5.8 |
| Labour | David Mann | 927 | 34.0 | −15.4 |
| Labour | Anthony Everard | 842 | 30.9 | −14.9 |
| UKIP | Michael Ford | 753 | 27.6 | +12.6 |
| Conservative | Alan Scattergood | 663 | 24.3 | −1.9 |
| Green | Dawn Holmes | 223 | 8.2 | +0.1 |
| Turnout | | 2,728 | 66.1 | +25.4 |
| Conservative gain from Labour | | | | |
| Labour hold | | | | |

=== Bocking South ===
Bocking South
| Party | Candidate | Votes | % | ±% |
|---|---|---|---|---|
| Conservative | John Baugh | 947 | 37.0 | −9.9 |
| Labour | Moia Thorogood | 737 | 28.8 | −17.3 |
| Labour | Lynn Watson | 695 | 27.2 | −14.7 |
| Conservative | Marlene Shepherd | 670 | 26.2 | −7.8 |
| UKIP | Linda Campbell Hunt | 601 | 23.5 | N/A |
| UKIP | Michael Hunt | 549 | 21.5 | N/A |
| Green | Simon Attwood | 240 | 9.4 | −4.2 |
| Turnout | | 2,557 | 57.4 | +21.2 |
| Conservative hold | | | | |
| Labour hold | | | | |

=== Braintree Central & Beckers Green ===
Braintree Central & Beckers Green
| Party | Candidate | Votes | % |
|---|---|---|---|
| Conservative | John Cunningham | 1,284 | 35.0 |
| Conservative | Andrew Hensman | 1,197 | 32.6 |
| Conservative | Mary Cunningham | 1,190 | 32.4 |
| Labour | Agnes Bishop | 1,125 | 30.7 |
| UKIP | Norma Huxter | 1,108 | 30.2 |
| Labour | Colin Riches | 1,019 | 27.8 |
| Labour | Celia Shute | 934 | 25.4 |
| Green | Dormer Andrews | 626 | 17.1 |
| Turnout | | 3,670 | 57.5 |
| Conservative win (new seat) | | | |
| Conservative win (new seat) | | | |
| Conservative win (new seat) | | | |

=== Braintree South ===
Braintree South
| Party | Candidate | Votes | % | ±% |
|---|---|---|---|---|
| Conservative | Alan Dunn | 1,437 | 53.7 | +11.4 |
| Conservative | Vanessa Santomauro | 1,126 | 42.1 | +1.7 |
| Labour | Martin Green | 943 | 35.3 | −0.3 |
| Labour | Edith Aganoke | 922 | 34.5 | −4.6 |
| Turnout | | 2,674 | 59.7 | +22.4 |
| Conservative gain from Labour | | | | |
| Conservative hold | | | | |

Labour gained one of these seats at a 2012 by-election.

=== Braintree West ===
Braintree West
| Party | Candidate | Votes | % |
|---|---|---|---|
| Conservative | John McKee | 1,840 | 56.5 |
| Conservative | Ronald Ramage | 1,179 | 36.2 |
| UKIP | Keith Johnson | 948 | 29.1 |
| Labour | Bill Edwards | 698 | 21.5 |
| Labour | Juliet Walton | 623 | 19.1 |
| Green | Freddie Gerrard-Abbott | 384 | 11.8 |
| Turnout | | 3,254 | 68.4 |
| Conservative win (new seat) | | | |
| Conservative win (new seat) | | | |

=== Bumpstead ===
Bumpstead
| Party | Candidate | Votes | % | ±% |
|---|---|---|---|---|
| Conservative | Robert Bolton | 1,082 | 61.3 | −8.7 |
| UKIP | Ian Gary | 343 | 19.4 | N/A |
| Labour | Christina Desborough | 325 | 18.4 | −11.6 |
| Turnout | | 1,765 | 75.7 | +24.4 |
| Conservative hold | | Swing | N/A | |

=== Coggeshall ===
Coggeshall
| Party | Candidate | Votes | % |
|---|---|---|---|
| Conservative | Patricia Newton | 1,796 | 51.3 |
| Conservative | Lynette Bowers-Flint | 1,470 | 42.0 |
| UKIP | Tom Wood | 734 | 21.0 |
| Labour | Gary Knights | 681 | 19.5 |
| Labour | Tom Walsh | 554 | 15.8 |
| Green | Howard Reed | 467 | 13.4 |
| Turnout | | 3,498 | 76.5 |
| Conservative win (new seat) | | | |
| Conservative win (new seat) | | | |

=== Gosfield & Greenstead Green ===
Gosfield & Greenstead Green
| Party | Candidate | Votes | % | ±% |
|---|---|---|---|---|
| Conservative | John O'Reilly-Cicconi | 1,167 | 67.7 | +3.2 |
| Labour | Deborah Warren | 318 | 18.4 | −5.4 |
| Green | Anne Bishop | 239 | 13.9 | +2.3 |
| Turnout | | 1,752 | 77.9 | +24.7 |
| Conservative hold | | Swing | ▲4.3 | |

=== Great Notley & Black Notley ===
Great Notley & Black Notley
| Party | Candidate | Votes | % |
|---|---|---|---|
| Conservative | Graham Butland | 3,136 | 60.9 |
| Conservative | Tom Cunningham | 2,712 | 52.7 |
| Conservative | Frankie Ricci | 2,590 | 50.3 |
| UKIP | Rowland Pudney | 1,191 | 23.1 |
| Labour | Jacqueline Thurgood | 711 | 13.8 |
| Labour | David Rice | 693 | 13.5 |
| Labour | Steven Goodfellow | 672 | 13.0 |
| Green | Howard Bills | 664 | 12.9 |
| Turnout | | 5,150 | 71.3 |
| Conservative win (new seat) | | | |
| Conservative win (new seat) | | | |
| Conservative win (new seat) | | | |

=== Halstead St. Andrew's ===
Halstead St. Andrew's
| Party | Candidate | Votes | % | ±% |
|---|---|---|---|---|
| Halstead Residents | David Hume | 1,172 | 41.4 | +7.6 |
| Conservative | Stephen Kirby | 991 | 35.0 | −0.7 |
| Conservative | Jennie Sutton | 788 | 27.9 | −14.1 |
| Halstead Residents | Andy Munday | 700 | 24.8 | −2.0 |
| Labour | Stephen Knight | 452 | 16.0 | −10.9 |
| Labour | Donna Tuck | 280 | 9.9 | −8.3 |
| Green | Nicholas Scales | 226 | 8.0 | N/A |
| Turnout | | 2,828 | 65.2 | +24.7 |
| Halstead Residents gain from Conservative | | | | |
| Conservative hold | | | | |

=== Halstead Trinity ===
Halstead Trinity
| Party | Candidate | Votes | % | ±% |
|---|---|---|---|---|
| Halstead Residents | Jackie Pell | 1,286 | 45.6 | +3.7 |
| Conservative | Julia Allen | 1,134 | 40.2 | +13.5 |
| Labour | Malcolm Fincken | 788 | 27.9 | −6.7 |
| UKIP | David Huxter | 788 | 27.9 | N/A |
| Labour | Garry Warren | 504 | 17.9 | −10.6 |
| Turnout | | 2,823 | 60.1 | +22.7 |
| Halstead Residents hold | | | | |
| Conservative gain from Labour | | | | |

=== Hatfield Peverel & Terling ===
Hatfield Peverel & Terling
| Party | Candidate | Votes | % |
|---|---|---|---|
| Conservative | David Bebb | 1,801 | 52.1 |
| Conservative | Daryn Hufton-Rees | 1,448 | 41.9 |
| UKIP | Garry Cockrill | 859 | 24.9 |
| UKIP | David Hodges | 528 | 15.3 |
| Labour | Maureen Bennett | 440 | 12.7 |
| Green | Jonathan Barker | 339 | 9.8 |
| Labour | Neil Coughlin | 312 | 9.0 |
| Independent | Les Priestley | 289 | 8.4 |
| Turnout | | 3,456 | 73.3 |
| Conservative win (new seat) | | | |
| Conservative win (new seat) | | | |

=== Hedingham ===
Hedingham
| Party | Candidate | Votes | % |
|---|---|---|---|
| Conservative | Jo Beavis | 1,351 | 49.0 |
| Conservative | Hylton Johnson | 1,126 | 40.9 |
| UKIP | Bernie Chilten | 757 | 27.5 |
| UKIP | Fred Swallow | 524 | 19.0 |
| Labour | Neil Fawkes | 459 | 16.7 |
| Labour | Stuart Scrivens | 457 | 16.6 |
| Turnout | | 2,755 | 66.6 |
| Conservative win (new seat) | | | |
| Conservative win (new seat) | | | |

=== Kelvedon & Feering ===
Kelvedon & Feering
| Party | Candidate | Votes | % |
|---|---|---|---|
| Conservative | John Elliott | 2,003 | 60.0 |
| Conservative | Robert Mitchell | 1,905 | 57.1 |
| Labour | Ian Marshall | 756 | 22.6 |
| Labour | Tony Lewis | 721 | 21.6 |
| Green | Daniel Shadbolt | 688 | 20.6 |
| Turnout | | 3,338 | 76.4 |
| Conservative win (new seat) | | | |
| Conservative win (new seat) | | | |

=== Rayne ===
Rayne
| Party | Candidate | Votes | % | ±% |
|---|---|---|---|---|
| Conservative | Michael Banthorpe | 996 | 61.7 | +19.5 |
| UKIP | Sean Carter | 331 | 20.5 | N/A |
| Labour | Nigel Gibson | 177 | 11.0 | −7.8 |
| Green | Poppy Gerrard-Abbott | 109 | 6.8 | N/A |
| Turnout | | 1,621 | 72.7 | +25.9 |
| Conservative hold | | Swing | N/A | |

=== Silver End and Cressing ===
Silver End and Cressing (2 seats)
| Party | Candidate | Votes | % |
|---|---|---|---|
| Green | James Abbott | 1,597 | 49.0 |
| Conservative | Kevin Bowers | 1,038 | 31.8 |
| Green | Bob Wright | 913 | 28.0 |
| UKIP | Brian Day | 736 | 22.6 |
| Labour | Jane Hayward | 407 | 12.5 |
| Labour | Greta Tew | 312 | 9.6 |
| Turnout | | 3,262 | 68.6 |
| Green win (new seat) | | | |
| Conservative win (new seat) | | | |

=== Stour Valley North ===
Stour Valley North
| Party | Candidate | Votes | % | ±% |
|---|---|---|---|---|
| Conservative | Iona Parker | 1,084 | 62.5 | −13.5 |
| UKIP | Raymond Richards | 379 | 21.9 | N/A |
| Labour | Peter Long | 271 | 15.6 | −8.4 |
| Turnout | | 1,753 | 76.6 | +25.5 |
| Conservative hold | | Swing | N/A | |

=== Stour Valley South ===
Stour Valley South
| Party | Candidate | Votes | % | ±% |
|---|---|---|---|---|
| Conservative | Wendy Scattergood | 1,119 | 58.5 | −17.5 |
| Liberal Democrats | Stephen Bolter | 289 | 15.1 | N/A |
| UKIP | Philip Palij | 271 | 14.2 | N/A |
| Labour | Fred Hearn | 234 | 12.2 | −11.6 |
| Turnout | | 1,925 | 78.8 | +25.1 |
| Conservative hold | | Swing | N/A | |

=== The Colnes ===
The Colnes
| Party | Candidate | Votes | % |
|---|---|---|---|
| Conservative | Christopher Siddall | 2,033 | 61.9 |
| Conservative | Gabrielle Spray | 1,606 | 48.9 |
| Labour | Felix Preston | 624 | 19.0 |
| Green | Alan Sheppard | 616 | 18.8 |
| Labour | Antony Gore | 336 | 10.2 |
| Turnout | | 3,282 | 72.8 |
| Conservative win (new seat) | | | |
| Conservative win (new seat) | | | |

=== Three Fields ===
Three Fields
| Party | Candidate | Votes | % | ±% |
|---|---|---|---|---|
| Conservative | Peter Tattersley | 1,862 | 53.6 | −17.5 |
| Conservative | Peter Schwier | 1,613 | 46.4 | −18.6 |
| UKIP | Angie Jamison | 945 | 27.2 | N/A |
| Labour | Margaret Lynch | 532 | 15.3 | −6.4 |
| Labour | Andrew Bennett | 403 | 11.6 | −7.2 |
| Green | Ursula Riedl | 392 | 11.3 | N/A |
| Turnout | | 3,476 | 75.3 | +25.0 |
| Conservative hold | | | | |
| Conservative hold | | | | |

=== Witham Central ===
Witham Central
| Party | Candidate | Votes | % |
|---|---|---|---|
| Conservative | Susan Wilson | 1,181 | 45.3 |
| Conservative | Angela Kilmartin | 1,140 | 43.7 |
| Labour | Brian Pereira | 582 | 22.3 |
| Labour | Duncan Wood | 495 | 19.0 |
| Green | Stephen Hicks | 438 | 16.8 |
| Liberal Democrats | Barry Fleet | 426 | 16.3 |
| Liberal Democrats | Helen Waring | 294 | 11.3 |
| Turnout | | 2,607 | 60.8 |
| Conservative win (new seat) | | | |
| Conservative win (new seat) | | | |

=== Witham North ===
Witham North
| Party | Candidate | Votes | % | ±% |
|---|---|---|---|---|
| Conservative | Christopher Bailey | 1,227 | 40.3 | +8.2 |
| Conservative | John Goodman | 1,140 | 37.5 | +9.9 |
| Labour | Phil Barlow | 992 | 32.6 | −13.3 |
| Labour | Eileen Davidson | 756 | 24.9 | −21.8 |
| Green | Michelle Weeks | 645 | 21.2 | +2.4 |
| Liberal Democrats | Pamela Hooper | 295 | 9.7 | −2.3 |
| Liberal Democrats | Derek Ray | 198 | 6.5 | N/A |
| Turnout | | 3,042 | 61.3 | +23.3 |
| Conservative gain from Labour | | | | |
| Conservative gain from Labour | | | | |

=== Witham South ===
Witham South
| Party | Candidate | Votes | % | ±% |
|---|---|---|---|---|
| Conservative | Janet Money | 1,395 | 50.7 | +4.6 |
| Conservative | Corinne Thompson | 1,249 | 45.4 | +2.1 |
| Labour | Paul Heath | 715 | 26.0 | −7.2 |
| Labour | Francis Macdonald | 506 | 18.4 | −14.5 |
| Green | Nelson Brunton | 287 | 10.4 | −5.9 |
| Liberal Democrats | Bernard Dearlove | 245 | 8.9 | −2.1 |
| Liberal Democrats | Hayden Hooper | 201 | 7.3 | N/A |
| Turnout | | 2,754 | 62.0 | +27.2 |
| Conservative hold | | | | |
| Conservative hold | | | | |

=== Witham West ===
Witham West
| Party | Candidate | Votes | % | ±% |
|---|---|---|---|---|
| Conservative | Patrick Horner | 1,478 | 46.9 | +6.3 |
| Conservative | William Rose | 1,351 | 42.9 | +1.5 |
| Labour | Lucy Barlow | 912 | 28.9 | −5.4 |
| Labour | Tony Bennett | 865 | 27.4 | −4.6 |
| Green | Philip Hughes | 459 | 14.6 | −2.4 |
| Liberal Democrats | James Fleet | 368 | 11.7 | +0.3 |
| Turnout | | 3,152 | 62.5 | +22.1 |
| Conservative hold | | | | |
| Conservative hold | | | | |

=== Yeldham ===
Yeldham
| Party | Candidate | Votes | % | ±% |
|---|---|---|---|---|
| Conservative | Richard Van Dulken | 872 | 55.9 | −2.3 |
| UKIP | Sam Cowie | 400 | 25.6 | N/A |
| Labour | Noel Owen | 288 | 18.5 | −2.1 |
| Turnout | | 1,576 | 73.1 | +28.2 |
| Conservative hold | | Swing | N/A | |

== By-elections ==
=== Witham South ===
Witham South: 5 May 2016
| Party | Candidate | Votes | % | ±% |
|---|---|---|---|---|
| Conservative | Gavin Maclure | 446 | 44.3 | −13.2 |
| Labour | Paul Heath | 376 | 37.4 | +10.8 |
| Green | Stephen Hicks | 184 | 18.3 | +12.0 |
| Majority | | 70 | 7.0 | N/A |
| Turnout | | 1,014 | 23.0 | −38.9 |
| Rejected ballots | | 8 | 0.8 | -1.1 |
| Conservative hold | | | | |

=== Witham North ===
Witham North: 20 October 2016
| Party | Candidate | Votes | % | ±% |
|---|---|---|---|---|
| Labour | Philip Barlow | 339 | 37.5 | +4.2 |
| Conservative | Lorne Campbell | 308 | 34.0 | −11.0 |
| Green | Michelle Weeks | 227 | 25.1 | +12.8 |
| Liberal Democrats | Mark Scott | 31 | 3.4 | −6.0 |
| Majority | | 31 | 3.4 | N/A |
| Turnout | | 906 | 18.3 | −43.0 |
| Rejected ballots | | 1 | 0.1 | -1.7 |
| Labour gain from Conservative | | | | |

=== Bumpstead ===
Bumpstead: 20 October 2016
| Party | Candidate | Votes | % | ±% |
|---|---|---|---|---|
| Conservative | Diana Garrod | 350 | 64.6 | +2.7 |
| UKIP | Debbie Shaw | 84 | 15.5 | −4.1 |
| Labour | William Edwards | 45 | 8.3 | −10.3 |
| Liberal Democrats | Stephen Bolter | 40 | 7.4 | N/A |
| Green | Anne Bishop | 23 | 4.2 | N/A |
| Majority | | 266 | 49.1 | +6.8 |
| Turnout | | 542 | 23.2 | −52.5 |
| Rejected ballots | | 0 | 0.0 | -0.8 |
| Conservative hold | | | | |

=== Bocking North ===
Bocking North: 3 May 2018
| Party | Candidate | Votes | % | ±% |
|---|---|---|---|---|
| Labour | Anthony Everard | 619 | 48.3 | +9.0 |
| Conservative | Dean Wallace | 540 | 42.2 | +3.1 |
| UKIP | Samuel Cowie | 78 | 6.1 | −10.6 |
| Green | Dawn Holmes | 44 | 3.4 | −1.5 |
| Majority | | 79 | 6.2 | N/A |
| Turnout | | 1,281 | 30.7 | −35.4 |
| Rejected ballots | | 0 | 0.0 | -0.4 |
| Labour gain from Conservative | | | | |

=== Hatfield Peverel and Terling ===
Hatfield Peverel and Terling: 3 May 2018
| Party | Candidate | Votes | % | ±% |
|---|---|---|---|---|
| Conservative | James Coleridge | 965 | 64.7 | −3.0 |
| Green | Jonathan Barker | 293 | 19.6 | +9.7 |
| Labour | Lucy Barlow | 234 | 15.7 | −6.3 |
| Majority | | 672 | 45.0 | N/A |
| Turnout | | 1,496 | 32.2 | −41.2 |
| Rejected ballots | | 4 | 0.3 | -0.5 |
| Conservative hold | | | | |
