= 1999 Braintree District Council election =

1999 UK local government election

← 1995	6 May 1999	2003 →

60 seats to Braintree District Council 31 seats needed for a majority

	First party	Second party	Third party
Party	Labour	Conservative	Independent
Last election	37 seats, 55.4%	10 seats, 21.5%	5 seats, 4.7%
Seats won	31	17	4
Seat change	▼6	▲7	▼1
Popular vote	26,600	17,088	2,829
Percentage	45.2%	29.0%	4.8%
Swing	▼10.2%	▲7.5%	▲0.1%
	Fourth party	Fifth party	Sixth party
Party	Liberal Democrats	Residents	Green
Last election	6 seats, 14.1%	2 seats, 3.1%	0 seats, 1.2%
Seats won	3	3	2
Seat change	▼3	▲1	▲2
Popular vote	8,149	1,739	2,433
Percentage	13.8%	3.0%	4.1%
Swing	▼0.3%	▼0.1%	▲2.9%
- Winner in each seat at the 1999 Braintree District Council election
Council control before election
Labour
Council control after election
Labour

The 1999 Braintree District Council election took place on 6 May 1999 to elect members of Braintree District Council in England. This was on the same day as other local elections.

== Summary ==
=== Results ===
1999 Braintree District Council election
Party	Seats	Gains	Losses	Net gain/loss	Seats %	Votes %	Votes	+/−
Labour	31			▼6	51.7	45.2	26,600	-10.2
Conservative	17			▲7	28.3	29.0	17,088	+7.5
Independent	4			▼1	6.7	4.8	2,829	+0.1
Liberal Democrats	3			▼3	5.0	13.8	8,149	-0.3
Residents	3			▲1	5.0	3.0	1,739	-0.1
Green	2			▲2	3.3	4.1	2,433	+2.9

== Ward results ==
=== Black Notley ===
Black Notley
Party	Candidate	Votes	%	±%
Liberal Democrats	P. Turner	673	55.3	
Conservative	P. Goddard	399	32.8	
Labour	B. Jagniaszek	145	11.9	
Majority		274	22.5	
Turnout		1,217	32.1	
Liberal Democrats hold		Swing		

=== Bocking North ===
Bocking North
Party	Candidate	Votes	%	±%
Labour	D. Mann	847	69.3	
Labour	M. Allard	761	62.3	
Labour	F. Card	738	60.4	
Conservative	P. Walsh	341	27.9	
Liberal Democrats	E. Gask	207	16.9	
Liberal Democrats	P. Braley	189	15.5	
Turnout		1,222	27.9	
Labour hold				
Labour hold				
Labour hold				

=== Bocking South ===
Bocking South
Party	Candidate	Votes	%	±%
Labour	G. Warne	786	66.7	
Labour	L. Green	744	63.1	
Labour	D. Taylor	703	59.6	
Conservative	G. Field	345	29.3	
Conservative	N. Birks	336	28.5	
Liberal Democrats	M. Martin	175	14.8	
Liberal Democrats	S. Seymour	135	11.5	
Liberal Democrats	H. Seymour	125	10.6	
Green	W. Partridge	96	8.1	
Green	D. Stewart	83	7.0	
Turnout		1,179	25.8	
Labour hold				
Labour hold				
Labour hold				

=== Braintree Central ===
Braintree Central
Party	Candidate	Votes	%	±%
Labour	P. Keeble	655	56.5	
Labour	A. Millam	636	54.8	
Labour	J. Unsworth	591	50.9	
Conservative	I. Roel	265	22.8	
Conservative	L. Walters	257	22.2	
Liberal Democrats	S. Dennis	207	17.8	
Liberal Democrats	T. Graystone	206	17.8	
Liberal Democrats	R. McDermott	187	16.1	
Green	D. Andrews	105	9.1	
Turnout		1,160	21.4	
Labour hold				
Labour hold				
Labour hold				

=== Braintree East ===
Braintree East
Party	Candidate	Votes	%	±%
Labour	E. Bishop	764	55.2	
Labour	D. Green	654	47.2	
Labour	A. Thompson	644	46.5	
Conservative	D. Messer	376	27.1	
Conservative	D. Reid	362	26.1	
Liberal Democrats	P. Brooks	305	22.0	
Liberal Democrats	P. Lemon	290	20.9	
Liberal Democrats	T. Brooks	283	20.4	
Turnout		1,385	20.3	
Labour hold				
Labour hold				
Labour hold				

=== Braintree West ===
Braintree West
Party	Candidate	Votes	%	±%
Liberal Democrats	R. Cavinder	638	35.7	
Labour	B. Buchan	609	34.1	
Labour	C. Bacon	607	34.0	
Liberal Democrats	L. Beckett	591	33.1	
Liberal Democrats	A. Martin	564	31.6	
Labour	M. Shirvington	552	30.9	
Conservative	G. Killick	542	30.4	
Conservative	J. McKee	532	29.8	
Conservative	B. Kirsch	526	29.5	
Turnout		1,785	32.7	
Liberal Democrats hold				
Labour hold				
Labour gain from Liberal Democrats				

=== Bumpstead ===
Bumpstead
Party	Candidate	Votes	%	±%
Conservative	J. Collar	376	60.9	
Labour	J. Marsden	241	39.1	
Majority		135	21.8	
Turnout		617	32.7	
Conservative gain from Labour		Swing		

=== Castle Hedingham ===
Castle Hedingham
Party	Candidate	Votes	%	±%
Conservative	H. Allfrey	475	74.6	
Labour	S. Scrivens	162	25.4	
Majority		313	49.2	
Turnout		637	44.1	
Conservative hold		Swing		

=== Coggeshall ===
Coggeshall
Party	Candidate	Votes	%	±%
Conservative	N. Edey	730	44.8	
Labour	C. Joyce	714	43.9	
Labour	E. Jones	702	43.1	
Conservative	T. McMillan	684	42.0	
Labour	P. Smith	663	40.7	
Liberal Democrats	J. Papworth	335	20.6	
Liberal Democrats	D. Sibley	283	17.4	
Turnout		1,628	37.6	
Conservative gain from Labour				
Labour hold				
Labour hold				

=== Colne Engaine & Greenstead Green ===
Colne Engaine & Greenstead Green
Party	Candidate	Votes	%	±%
Conservative	A. Shelton	367	72.8	
Labour	S. Knight	137	27.2	
Majority		230	45.6	
Turnout		504	39.9	
Conservative hold		Swing		

=== Cressing ===
Cressing
Party	Candidate	Votes	%	±%
Independent	L. Flint	271	63.0	
Labour	A. Final	106	24.7	
Liberal Democrats	M. Boutell	53	12.3	
Majority		165	38.3	
Turnout		430	33.7	
Independent hold		Swing		

=== Earls Colne ===
Earls Colne
Party	Candidate	Votes	%	±%
Independent	S. Boyce	645	72.2	
Independent	S. Mascall	568	63.6	
Labour	T. Fyfe	248	27.8	
Labour	S. Heppolette	212	23.7	
Turnout		893	29.7	
Independent hold				
Independent gain from Labour				

=== Gosfield ===
Gosfield
Party	Candidate	Votes	%	±%
Conservative	B. Broyd	436	72.8	
Labour	L. Webb	163	27.2	
Majority		273	45.6	
Turnout		599	27.2	
Conservative hold		Swing		

=== Halstead Holy Trinity ===
Halstead Holy Trinity
Party	Candidate	Votes	%	±%
Residents	J. Pell	702	56.3	
Labour	R. Mayes	629	50.4	
Labour	M. Fincken	535	42.9	
Labour	G. Warren	440	35.3	
Conservative	T. McArdie	234	18.8	
Conservative	B. Mison	208	16.7	
Liberal Democrats	C. Whybrow	148	11.9	
Liberal Democrats	C. Forder	122	9.8	
Liberal Democrats	M. Clayton	112	9.0	
Turnout		1,247	30.9	
Residents hold				
Labour hold				
Labour hold				

=== Halstead St. Andrew's ===
Halstead St. Andrew's
Party	Candidate	Votes	%	±%
Residents	B. Gage	522	39.2	
Residents	M. Gage	515	38.6	
Labour	B. Carr	396	29.7	
Labour	G. McCoyd	345	25.9	
Conservative	L. Dye	240	18.0	
Conservative	M. Mison	211	15.8	
Liberal Democrats	O. Forder	149	11.2	
Liberal Democrats	J. Barnes	128	9.6	
Turnout		1,333	32.7	
Residents hold				
Residents gain from Labour				

=== Hatfield Peverel ===
Hatfield Peverel
Party	Candidate	Votes	%	±%
Conservative	K. Bigden	633	56.9	
Conservative	J. Jarvis	621	55.8	
Independent	E. Royffe	368	33.1	
Labour	J. Glasman	329	29.6	
Labour	P. Heath	227	20.4	
Turnout		1,113	31.1	
Conservative hold				
Conservative gain from Independent				

=== Kelvedon ===
Kelvedon
Party	Candidate	Votes	%	±%
Labour	E. Davidson	779	44.4	
Labour	I. Marshall	779	44.4	
Labour	J. Fyfe	711	40.5	
Conservative	S. Gibbs	663	37.8	
Conservative	S. Openshaw	610	34.8	
Independent	G. Raison	508	29.0	
Liberal Democrats	M. Ashby	211	12.0	
Green	P. Leatherdale	138	7.9	
Turnout		1,754	41.9	
Labour hold				
Labour hold				
Labour hold				

=== Panfield ===
Panfield
Party	Candidate	Votes	%	±%
Conservative	S. Walsh	308	56.5	
Labour	V. Carnell	237	43.5	
Majority		71	13.0	
Turnout		545	41.0	
Conservative gain from Independent		Swing		

=== Rayne ===
Rayne
Party	Candidate	Votes	%	±%
Liberal Democrats	A. Meadows	355	54.6	
Conservative	G. Lees	207	31.8	
Labour	R. Parsons	88	13.5	
Majority		148	22.8	
Turnout		650	32.4	
Liberal Democrats hold		Swing		

=== Sible Hedingham ===
Sible Hedingham
Party	Candidate	Votes	%	±%
Conservative	C. Tanner	316	45.3	
Conservative	J. Brown	314	45.1	
Liberal Democrats	T. Ellis	248	35.6	
Liberal Democrats	J. Turner	173	24.8	
Labour	N. Owen	126	18.1	
Labour	F. Hearn	118	16.9	
Turnout		697	23.9	
Conservative gain from Liberal Democrats				
Conservative gain from Liberal Democrats				

=== Stour Valley Central ===
Stour Valley Central
Party	Candidate	Votes	%	±%
Conservative	David Finch	273	59.1	
Labour	P. Owen	189	40.9	
Majority		84	18.2	
Turnout		462	35.6	
Conservative hold		Swing		

=== Stour Valley North ===
Stour Valley North
Party	Candidate	Votes	%	±%
Conservative	N. Harley	348	65.3	
Labour	L. Scrivens	185	34.7	
Majority		163	30.6	
Turnout		533	42.3	
Conservative hold		Swing		

=== Stour Valley South ===
Stour Valley South
Party	Candidate	Votes	%	±%
Conservative	V. Acheson	444	64.3	
Labour	C. Kotz	131	19.0	
Liberal Democrats	C. Savill	115	16.7	
Majority		313	45.3	
Turnout		690	39.9	
Conservative hold		Swing		

=== Terling ===
Terling
Party	Candidate	Votes	%	±%
Conservative	M. Galione	280	48.9	
Labour	M. Williams	242	42.2	
Liberal Democrats	D. Barber	51	8.9	
Majority		38	6.7	
Turnout		573	46.1	
Conservative gain from Labour		Swing		

=== Three Fields ===
Three Fields
Party	Candidate	Votes	%	±%
Conservative	R. Hawkins	736	70.6	
Conservative	J. Finbow	714	68.5	
Labour	P. Johnson	270	25.9	
Labour	A. Axtell	244	23.4	
Turnout		1,043	34.7	
Conservative hold				
Conservative hold				

=== Upper Colne ===
Upper Colne
Party	Candidate	Votes	%	±%
Conservative	R. Bolton	429	70.6	
Labour	D. Dyson	179	29.4	
Majority		250	41.2	
Turnout		608	42.4	
Conservative hold		Swing		

=== Witham Central ===
Witham Central
Party	Candidate	Votes	%	±%
Independent	H. Pitchford	385	46.3	
Conservative	M. Lager	285	34.3	
Labour	M. Jones	162	19.5	
Majority		100	12.0	
Turnout		832	35.7	
Independent hold		Swing		

=== Witham Chipping Hill ===
Witham Chipping Hill
Party	Candidate	Votes	%	±%
Labour	P. Barlow	432	54.8	
Labour	K. Boylan	423	53.7	
Conservative	N. Andrews	162	20.6	
Conservative	G. Peck	145	18.4	
Liberal Democrats	P. Verrall	129	16.4	
Liberal Democrats	K. Verrall	116	14.7	
Green	S. Ransome	56	7.1	
Green	N. Brunton	52	6.6	
Turnout		788	23.2	
Labour hold				
Labour hold				

=== Witham North ===
Witham North
Party	Candidate	Votes	%	±%
Labour	R. Evans	605	70.1	
Labour	J. Gyford	586	67.9	
Labour	I. Pinton	567	65.7	
Conservative	B. Farrow	191	22.1	
Green	P. Brunton	134	15.5	
Green	J. Jones	102	11.8	
Green	K. Peterson	93	10.8	
Turnout		863	23.5	
Labour hold				
Labour hold				
Labour hold				

=== Witham Silver End & Rivenhall ===
Witham Silver End & Rivenhall
Party	Candidate	Votes	%	±%
Green	James Abbott	715	52.4	
Green	Phillip Hughes	554	40.6	
Labour	B. Tate	551	40.4	
Labour	G. Tew	496	36.4	
Liberal Democrats	E. Fierheller	204	15.0	
Independent	J. Dean	84	6.2	
Turnout		1,364	41.3	
Green gain from Labour				
Green gain from Labour				

=== Witham South ===
Witham South
Party	Candidate	Votes	%	±%
Labour	J. Martin	583	54.1	
Labour	R. Tricknell	526	48.8	
Conservative	D. Haggerty	271	25.2	
Conservative	N. Lightfoot	265	24.6	
Liberal Democrats	B. Fleet	174	16.2	
Liberal Democrats	C. May	144	13.4	
Green	A. Pickett	78	7.2	
Green	N. Scales	73	6.8	
Turnout		1,077	21.7	
Labour hold				
Labour hold				

=== Witham West ===
Witham West
Party	Candidate	Votes	%	±%
Labour	K. Tearle	432	49.8	
Labour	J. Reekie	426	49.1	
Conservative	J. Jarvis	260	30.0	
Conservative	R. Wacey	237	27.3	
Liberal Democrats	C. May	124	14.3	
Green	C. Gerrard	77	8.9	
Green	C. Hobbs-Waller	77	8.9	
Turnout		867	29.9	
Labour hold				
Labour hold				

=== Yeldham ===
Yeldham
Party	Candidate	Votes	%	±%
Labour	J. Kotz	Unopposed		
Turnout		N/A	N/A	N/A
Labour hold		Swing	N/A	

== By-elections ==
=== Braintree East ===
Braintree East by-election: 10 February 2000
Party	Candidate	Votes	%	±%
Labour		587	50.4	–2.5
Conservative		344	29.5	+3.5
Liberal Democrats		192	16.5	–4.6
Green		42	3.6	N/A
Majority		243	20.9	N/A
Turnout		1,165	17.0	–3.3
Registered electors		6,853		
Labour hold		Swing	▼3.0	

=== Braintree Central (February 2000) ===
Braintree Central by-election: 10 February 2000
Party	Candidate	Votes	%	±%
Labour		460	53.5	+0.3
Conservative		260	30.2	+8.7
Liberal Democrats		140	16.3	–0.5
Majority		200	23.3	N/A
Turnout		860	16.0	–5.4
Registered electors		5,375		
Labour hold		Swing	▼4.2	

=== Castle Hedingham ===
Castle Hedingham by-election: 29 June 2000
Party	Candidate	Votes	%	±%
Conservative		328	69.5	–5.1
Labour		144	30.5	+5.1
Majority		184	39.0	–10.2
Turnout		472	32.7	–11.4
Registered electors		1,443		
Conservative hold		Swing	▼5.1	

=== Braintree Central (July 2000) ===
Braintree Central by-election: 5 July 2000
Party	Candidate	Votes	%	±%
Labour		694	52.1	–1.1
Conservative		475	35.7	+14.2
Liberal Democrats		124	9.3	–7.5
Green		38	2.9	–5.6
Majority		219	16.4	N/A
Turnout		1,331	24.1	+2.7
Registered electors		5,523		
Labour hold		Swing	▼7.7	

=== Braintree West ===
Braintree West by-election: 31 January 2002
Party	Candidate	Votes	%	±%
Labour		671	39.0	+5.0
Conservative		666	38.7	+8.4
Liberal Democrats		261	15.2	–20.5
Independent		66	3.8	N/A
Green		39	2.3	N/A
Other		19	1.1	N/A
Majority		5	0.3	N/A
Turnout		1,722	30.0	–2.7
Registered electors		5,740		
Labour hold		Swing	▼1.7	

=== Braintree Central (2002) ===
Braintree Central by-election: 21 March 2002
Party	Candidate	Votes	%	±%
Labour		758	61.0	+7.8
Conservative		278	22.4	+0.9
Liberal Democrats		144	11.6	–5.2
Green		62	5.0	–3.5
Majority		480	38.6	N/A
Turnout		1,242	21.8	+0.4
Registered electors		5,697		
Labour hold		Swing	▲3.5	
