= Upper Colne Marshes =

Protected area in Essex, England

Coordinates: 51.864°N 0.944°E

- Site of Special Scientific Interest
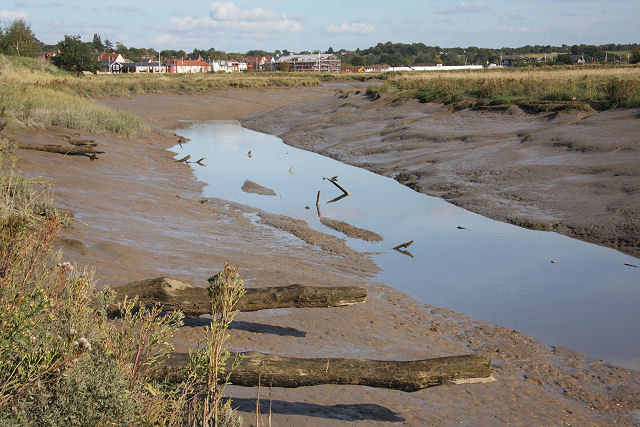
- Location of Upper Colne Marshes.
- Area of search: Essex
- Grid reference: TM 022232; TM 050209
- Interest: Biological
- Area: 114.1 ha (282 acres)
- Notification date: 1992
- Location map: Magic Map

Upper Colne Marshes is a 114.1-hectare (282-acre) biological Site of Special Scientific Interest south and west of Wivenhoe in Essex. It lies along stretches of the River Colne and Roman River.

The site has grazing marshes, salt tidal marshes, beaches, sea walls and intertidal mud. It has an important assemblage of nationally scarce plants and diverse ditch types. The grassland is species rich, with rare types such as sea barley, and salt marsh has the nationally uncommon lax-flowered sea-lavender. Insects include the nationally scarce Roesel's bush-cricket.

The site is in five areas, some of which are crossed by roads and footpaths.
