= 1995 Braintree District Council election =

1995 UK local government election

← 1991	4 May 1995	1999 →

60 seats to Braintree District Council 31 seats needed for a majority

	First party	Second party	Third party
Party	Labour	Conservative	Liberal Democrats
Last election	21 seats, 36.0%	23 seats, 37.1%	6 seats, 17.7%
Seats won	37	10	6
Seat change	▲16	▼13	0
Popular vote	44,458	17,248	11,352
Percentage	55.4%	21.5%	14.1%
Swing	▲19.4%	▼15.6%	▼3.6%
	Fourth party	Fifth party
Party	Independent	Residents
Last election	6 seats, 4.3%	N/A
Seats won	5	2
Seat change	▼1	▲2
Popular vote	3,767	2,451
Percentage	4.7%	3.1%
Swing	▲0.4%	N/A
- Winner in each seat at the 1995 Braintree District Council election
Council control before election
No overall control
Council control after election
Labour

The 1995 Braintree District Council election took place on 4 May 1995 to elect members of Braintree District Council in England. This was on the same day as other local elections.

== Election summary ==
1995 Braintree District Council election
Party	Seats	Gains	Losses	Net gain/loss	Seats %	Votes %	Votes	+/−
Labour	37			▲16	61.7	55.4	44,458	+19.4
Conservative	10			▼13	16.7	21.5	17,248	-15.6
Liberal Democrats	6			0	10.0	14.1	11,352	-3.6
Independent	5			▼1	8.3	4.7	3,767	+0.4
Residents	2			▲2	3.3	3.1	2,451	New
Green	0			0	0.0	1.2	971	+0.4
Ratepayer	0			▼4	0.0	0.0	N/A	-3.5

== Ward results ==
=== Black Notley ===
Black Notley
Party	Candidate	Votes	%	±%
Liberal Democrats	P. Turner*	634	56.2	
Conservative	P. Goddard	251	22.2	
Labour	J. White	244	21.6	
Majority		383	34.0	
Turnout		1,129	45.4	
Liberal Democrats hold		Swing		

=== Bocking North ===
Bocking North
Party	Candidate	Votes	%	±%
Labour	D. Mann*	1,368	71.6	
Labour	M. Allard*	1,272	66.6	
Labour	F. Card*	1,243	65.0	
Conservative	R. Potter	392	20.5	
Liberal Democrats	B. Rice	259	13.6	
Liberal Democrats	R. Venus	216	11.3	
Liberal Democrats	L. Morad-Tehrani	171	8.9	
Turnout		1,911	44.0	
Labour hold				
Labour hold				
Labour hold				

=== Bocking South ===
Bocking South
Party	Candidate	Votes	%	±%
Labour	G. Warne*	1,391	66.2	
Labour	L. Green	1,319	64.6	
Labour	P. Johnson*	1,307	64.0	
Conservative	J. Eades	430	21.1	
Conservative	G. Field	426	20.9	
Liberal Democrats	S. Seymour	248	12.2	
Liberal Democrats	R. Sweeting	216	10.6	
Liberal Democrats	I. Wood	196	9.6	
Turnout		2,041	45.1	
Labour hold				
Labour hold				
Labour hold				

=== Braintree Central ===
Braintree Central
Party	Candidate	Votes	%	±%
Labour	G. Warren*	1,172	65.8	
Labour	R. Keeble*	1,150	64.5	
Labour	J. Perks*	1,101	61.8	
Liberal Democrats	T. Greystone	397	22.3	
Liberal Democrats	D. Rice	387	21.7	
Liberal Democrats	B. Stock	325	18.2	
Conservative	V. Stein	266	14.9	
Turnout		1,782	36.5	
Labour hold				
Labour hold				
Labour hold				

=== Braintree East ===
Braintree East
Party	Candidate	Votes	%	±%
Labour	E. Bishop*	1,341	63.1	
Labour	K. Miller	1,195	56.2	
Labour	D. Green	1,176	55.3	
Conservative	R. Davis*	453	21.3	
Conservative	S. Gibbs	404	19.0	
Liberal Democrats	P. Brooks	363	17.1	
Liberal Democrats	P. Braley	348	16.4	
Liberal Democrats	T. Brooks	295	13.9	
Turnout		2,125	38.1	
Labour hold				
Labour gain from Conservative				
Labour gain from Conservative				

=== Braintree West ===
Braintree West
Party	Candidate	Votes	%	±%
Liberal Democrats	R. Cavinder*	900	38.0	
Liberal Democrats	D. Rice*	877	37.0	
Labour	B. Buchan	848	35.8	
Liberal Democrats	J. Turner*	832	35.1	
Labour	R. Moules	822	34.7	
Labour	M. Shirvington	817	34.5	
Conservative	D. Bowtell	695	29.3	
Conservative	B. Kirsch	526	22.2	
Conservative	J. McKee	526	22.2	
Turnout		2,371	48.0	
Liberal Democrats hold				
Liberal Democrats hold				
Labour gain from Liberal Democrats				

=== Bumpstead ===
Bumpstead
Party	Candidate	Votes	%	±%
Labour	M. Holmes	311	35.6	
Liberal Democrats	V. Pattie	289	33.1	
Conservative	J. Collar*	273	31.3	
Majority		22	2.5	
Turnout		873	49.3	
Labour gain from Conservative		Swing		

=== Castle Hedingham ===
Castle Hedingham
Party	Candidate	Votes	%	±%
Conservative	H. Allfrey*	375	44.3	
Liberal Democrats	M. Stockill	259	30.6	
Labour	E. Snarey	212	25.1	
Majority		116	13.7	
Turnout		846	57.7	
Conservative hold		Swing		

=== Coggeshall ===
Coggeshall
Party	Candidate	Votes	%	±%
Labour	B. Tebbutt	1,228	51.6	
Labour	M. Cowlin	1,052	44.2	
Labour	R. Naylor	854	35.9	
Independent	W. Drake*	799	33.6	
Conservative	A. Langdale*	592	24.9	
Conservative	M. Trapp*	569	23.9	
Conservative	E. Hall	501	21.0	
Independent	M. Sutherland	493	20.7	
Liberal Democrats	D. Sibley	323	13.6	
Turnout		2,381	56.0	
Labour gain from Conservative				
Labour gain from Independent				
Labour gain from Conservative				

=== Colne Engaine and Greenstead Green ===
Colne Engaine and Greenstead Green
Party	Candidate	Votes	%	±%
Conservative	M. Watson*	Unopposed		
Turnout		N/A	N/A	N/A
Conservative hold		Swing	N/A	

=== Cressing ===
Cressing
Party	Candidate	Votes	%	±%
Independent	L. Flint*	385	53.8	
Labour	G. Tew	330	46.2	
Majority		55	7.6	
Turnout		715	58.0	
Independent hold		Swing		

=== Earls Colne ===
Earls Colne
Party	Candidate	Votes	%	±%
Labour	A. Axtell	530	44.1	
Independent	S. Boyce*	526	43.7	
Labour	T. Fyfe	428	35.6	
Independent	P. Taylor	420	34.9	
Conservative	H. Morter	234	19.5	
Turnout		1,203	40.7	
Labour gain from Independent				
Independent hold				

=== Gosfield ===
Gosfield
Party	Candidate	Votes	%	±%
Conservative	B. Broyd	248	37.2	
Independent	R. Turpin	212	31.8	
Labour	P. Webb	116	17.4	
Liberal Democrats	R. Waters	91	13.6	
Majority		36	5.4	
Turnout		667	58.7	
Conservative hold		Swing		

=== Halstead Holy Trinity ===
Halstead Holy Trinity
Party	Candidate	Votes	%	±%
Labour	R. Mayes	977	56.2	
Labour	M. Fincken	852	49.0	
Residents	J. Pell	815	46.9	
Labour	S. Knight	674	38.8	
Residents	P. Garlick*	492	28.3	
Conservative	J. Pike	322	18.5	
Liberal Democrats	J. Barnes	190	10.9	
Liberal Democrats	C. Forder	160	9.2	
Liberal Democrats	B. Hiscox	95	5.5	
Turnout		1,738	43.7	
Labour hold				
Labour gain from Residents				
Residents hold				

=== Halstead St. Andrew's ===
Halstead St. Andrew's
Party	Candidate	Votes	%	±%
Residents	A. De Frates*	614	39.1	
Labour	G. McCoyd	541	34.4	
Residents	E. McDowell	530	33.7	
Labour	G. Warren	524	33.4	
Liberal Democrats	O. Forder	324	20.6	
Liberal Democrats	D. Clayton	253	16.1	
Conservative	E. Hamilton	182	11.6	
Turnout		1,571	43.0	
Residents hold				
Labour gain from Residents				

=== Hatfield Peverel ===
Hatfield Peverel
Party	Candidate	Votes	%	±%
Conservative	K. Bigden*	646	43.9	
Independent	E. Royffe	597	40.6	
Conservative	J. Jarvis	529	35.9	
Labour	C. Stevens	495	33.6	
Labour	P. Heath	471	32.0	
Turnout		1,472	41.0	
Conservative hold				
Independent hold				

=== Kelvedon ===
Kelvedon
Party	Candidate	Votes	%	±%
Labour	I. Marshall	1,182	54.5	
Labour	E. Davidson	1,106	51.0	
Labour	J. Fyfe	1,039	47.9	
Conservative	R. Crayston*	936	43.2	
Conservative	J. Kimberley*	922	42.5	
Conservative	A. Savill*	905	41.7	
Liberal Democrats	P. Bensilum	330	15.5	
Turnout		2,168	53.0	
Labour gain from Conservative				
Labour gain from Conservative				
Labour gain from Conservative				

=== Panfield ===
Panfield
Party	Candidate	Votes	%	±%
Independent	A. Overall*	411	67.3	
Labour	D. Read	200	32.7	
Majority		211	34.6	
Turnout		611	44.6	
Independent hold		Swing		

=== Rayne ===
Rayne
Party	Candidate	Votes	%	±%
Liberal Democrats	A. Meadows	438	46.3	
Conservative	A. Moore*	306	32.3	
Labour	J. Marsden	202	21.4	
Majority		132	14.0	
Turnout		946	50.0	
Liberal Democrats gain from Conservative		Swing		

=== Sible Hedingham ===
Sible Hedingham
Party	Candidate	Votes	%	±%
Liberal Democrats	T. Ellis*	388	42.5	
Liberal Democrats	N. Partridge	336	36.8	
Labour	N. Owen	311	34.1	
Labour	S. Scrivens	273	29.9	
Conservative	K. Ward	229	25.1	
Turnout		912	32.0	
Liberal Democrats hold				
Liberal Democrats gain from Conservative				

=== Stour Valley Central ===
Stour Valley Central
Party	Candidate	Votes	%	±%
Conservative	David Finch	274	51.3	
Labour	P. Owen	260	48.7	
Majority		14	2.6	
Turnout		534	44.2	
Conservative hold		Swing		

=== Stour Valley North ===
Stour Valley North
Party	Candidate	Votes	%	±%
Conservative	M. Hall*	302	53.1	
Labour	B. Kotz	267	46.9	
Majority		35	6.2	
Turnout		569	47.5	
Conservative hold		Swing		

=== Stour Valley South ===
Stour Valley South
Party	Candidate	Votes	%	±%
Conservative	J. Roberts*	436	50.5	
Liberal Democrats	C. Savill	217	25.1	
Labour	C. Kotz	210	24.3	
Majority		219	25.4	
Turnout		863	51.7	
Conservative hold		Swing		

=== Terling ===
Terling
Party	Candidate	Votes	%	±%
Labour	M. Williams	284	43.6	
Conservative	R. Hodson	268	41.2	
Independent	D. Hodges	99	15.2	
Majority		16	2.5	
Turnout		651	50.0	
Labour gain from Conservative		Swing		

=== Three Fields ===
Three Fields
Party	Candidate	Votes	%	±%
Conservative	R. Hawkins*	844	58.0	
Conservative	J. Finbow*	838	57.6	
Labour	A. Gibson	514	35.4	
Labour	S. Parsons	478	32.9	
Turnout		1,454	59.5	
Conservative hold				
Conservative hold				

=== Upper Colne ===
Upper Colne
Party	Candidate	Votes	%	±%
Conservative	R. Bolton*	362	56.0	
Labour	W. Tindall	285	44.0	
Majority		77	12.0	
Turnout		647	47.0	
Conservative hold		Swing		

=== Witham Central ===
Witham Central
Party	Candidate	Votes	%	±%
Independent	H. Pitchford*	318	31.1	
Labour	J. Martin	310	30.3	
Conservative	M. Lager	248	24.2	
Liberal Democrats	B. Fleet	147	14.4	
Majority		8	0.8	
Turnout		1,023	46.5	
Independent hold		Swing		

=== Witham Chipping Hill ===
Witham Chipping Hill
Party	Candidate	Votes	%	±%
Labour	K. Boylan*	789	62.6	
Labour	P. Barlow	784	62.2	
Conservative	R. Wacey	229	18.2	
Liberal Democrats	S. Goodfellow	172	13.6	
Liberal Democrats	A. Slowman	154	12.2	
Green	S. Ransome	123	9.8	
Green	N. Brunton	99	7.9	
Turnout		1,261	37.3	
Labour hold				
Labour hold				

=== Witham North ===
Witham North
Party	Candidate	Votes	%	±%
Labour	R. Evans	1,008	74.5	
Labour	J. Gyford*	994	73.5	
Labour	I. Pointon*	922	68.1	
Conservative	B. Farrow	317	23.4	
Turnout		1,353	35.0	
Labour hold				
Labour hold				
Labour hold				

=== Witham Silver End and Rivenhall ===
Witham Silver End and Rivenhall
Party	Candidate	Votes	%	±%
Labour	J. Lyon*	1,000	69.6	
Labour	S. Hughes*	878	61.1	
Green	James Abbott	307	21.4	
Conservative	A. Macwillson	233	16.2	
Green	K. Peterson	176	12.2	
Turnout		1,437	45.5	
Labour hold				
Labour hold				

=== Witham South ===
Witham South
Party	Candidate	Votes	%	±%
Labour	J. O'Hare	1,061	64.3	
Labour	B. Tate	946	57.4	
Liberal Democrats	C. Ginger	367	22.3	
Liberal Democrats	C. Mary	333	20.2	
Conservative	H. Sharp	326	19.8	
Turnout		1,649	34.7	
Labour hold				
Labour hold				

=== Witham West ===
Witham West
Party	Candidate	Votes	%	±%
Labour	A. Bennett*	804	61.8	
Labour	J. Reekie	788	60.6	
Conservative	G. Gibbs*	339	26.1	
Conservative	P. Ryland	278	21.4	
Green	F. Mawson	137	10.5	
Green	P. Hughes	129	9.9	
Turnout		1,300	44.1	
Labour hold				
Labour gain from Conservative				

=== Yeldham ===
Yeldham
Party	Candidate	Votes	%	±%
Labour	J. Kotz	414	60.5	
Conservative	P. Hyland	189	27.6	
Liberal Democrats	C. Thompson	81	11.8	
Majority		225	32.9	
Turnout		684	47.0	
Labour gain from Conservative		Swing		

== By-elections ==
=== Braintree Central (1996) ===
Braintree Central by-election: 7 March 1996
Party	Candidate	Votes	%	±%
Labour		825	66.1	+2.3
Liberal Democrats		221	17.7	–3.9
Conservative		167	13.4	–1.2
Green		35	2.8	N/A
Majority		604	48.4	N/A
Turnout		1,248	25.4	–11.1
Registered electors		4,913		
Labour hold		Swing	▲3.1	

=== Braintree Central (1997) ===
Braintree Central by-election: 7 March 1997
Party	Candidate	Votes	%	±%
Labour		583	65.5	+1.7
Liberal Democrats		165	18.5	–3.1
Conservative		119	13.4	–1.2
Green		23	2.6	N/A
Majority		418	47.0	N/A
Turnout		890	17.8	–18.7
Registered electors		5,000		
Labour hold		Swing	▲2.4	
