= 1983 Braintree District Council election =

Braintree District Council election

← 1979	5 May 1983	1987 →

All 60 seats to Braintree District Council 31 seats needed for a majority
- Turnout: 48.0% (▼29.6%)

	First party	Second party	Third party
Party	Conservative	Labour	Independent
Last election	28 seats, 46.5%	17 seats, 29.3%	7 seats, 12.1%
Seats won	28	16	10
Seat change	Steady	▼1	▲3
Popular vote	29,970	20,296	7,638
Percentage	41.7%	28.2%	10.6%
Swing	▼4.8%	▼8.3%	▲5.4%
	Fourth party	Fifth party	Sixth party
Party	Alliance	Residents	Ind. Conservative
Last election	3 seats, 8.5%	2 seats, 2.4%	1 seat, 0.4%
Seats won	3	2	1
Seat change	Steady	Steady	Steady
Popular vote	11,488	1,870	586
Percentage	16.0%	2.6%	0.8%
Swing	▲7.5%	▲0.2%	▲0.4%
- Winner of each seat at the 1983 Braintree District Council election
Council control before election
No overall control
Council control after election
No overall control

The 1983 Braintree District Council election took place on 5 May 1983 to elect members of Braintree District Council in England. This was on the same day as other local elections.

== Summary ==
=== Election result ===
1983 Braintree District Council election
Party	Seats	Gains	Losses	Net gain/loss	Seats %	Votes %	Votes	+/−
Conservative	28	3	5	Steady	46.7	41.7	29,970	–4.8
Labour	16	1	2	▼1	26.7	28.2	20,296	–8.3
Independent	10	3	0	▲3	16.7	10.6	7,638	+5.4
Alliance	3	1	1	Steady	5.0	16.0	11,488	+7.5
Residents	2	0	0	Steady	3.3	2.6	1,870	+0.2
Ind. Conservative	1	0	0	Steady	1.7	0.8	586	+0.4

== Ward results ==
=== Black Notley ===
Black Notley
Party	Candidate	Votes	%	±%
Conservative	E. Mills*	497	54.6	–20.7
Alliance	P. Turner	301	33.0	N/A
Labour	E. Hooper	113	12.4	–12.3
Majority		196	21.5	–29.0
Turnout		911	48.6	–27.2
Registered electors		1,873		
Conservative hold		Swing	N/A	

=== Bocking North ===
Bocking North
Party	Candidate	Votes	%	±%
Labour	D. Mann	1,049	45.9	–2.1
Labour	A. Millam*	963	42.2	–7.5
Labour	M. Allard	947	41.5	–4.2
Conservative	A. Comfort	905	39.6	–7.0
Conservative	P. Matthewman	851	37.3	–8.0
Conservative	A. Bols	842	36.9	–7.7
Independent	R. Perkin	331	14.5	N/A
Turnout		2,283	54.0	–21.0
Registered electors		4,228		
Labour hold				
Labour hold				
Labour gain from Conservative				

=== Bocking South ===
Bocking South
Party	Candidate	Votes	%	±%
Labour	G. Warne*	1,120	50.3	–3.5
Labour	R. Watson*	921	41.4	–6.1
Labour	A. Mackenzie*	897	40.3	–7.8
Conservative	M. Ware	742	33.3	–11.4
Conservative	H. Bourne	706	31.7	–11.5
Conservative	S. Brown	689	31.0	–11.8
Alliance	J. Purdy	365	16.4	N/A
Alliance	D. Mayhew	308	13.8	N/A
Alliance	J. O'Reilly	300	13.5	N/A
Turnout		2,225	49.7	–25.4
Registered electors		4,477		
Labour hold				
Labour hold				
Labour hold				

=== Braintree Central ===
Braintree Central
Party	Candidate	Votes	%	±%
Labour	G. Warren*	848	46.6	–6.8
Labour	R. Keeble	768	42.2	–7.3
Labour	J. Perks*	743	40.8	–9.8
Conservative	J. Harrington	605	33.2	–10.0
Conservative	D. Sayers	566	31.1	–11.3
Alliance	J. Grice	367	20.2	N/A
Turnout		1,821	41.0	–32.9
Registered electors		4,442		
Labour hold				
Labour hold				
Labour hold				

=== Braintree East ===
Braintree East
Party	Candidate	Votes	%	±%
Conservative	P. Gilthorpe*	801	47.1	+6.8
Conservative	J. Amies*	783	46.1	+7.8
Conservative	A. Plumb*	753	44.3	+6.6
Alliance	D. Choate	491	28.9	+3.7
Labour	S. Higby	405	23.8	–7.8
Alliance	S. Seymore	378	22.2	–1.4
Labour	A. Sains	375	22.1	–9.0
Labour	P. Sains	362	21.3	–7.6
Turnout		1,699	36.2	–39.8
Registered electors		4,694		
Conservative hold				
Conservative hold				
Conservative hold				

=== Braintree West ===
Braintree West
Party	Candidate	Votes	%	±%
Alliance	M. Bryan*	1,441	55.7	+10.9
Alliance	J. Ross*	1,419	54.9	+3.9
Alliance	B. Margetts	1,327	51.3	+11.7
Conservative	S. Harper*	1,144	44.2	+4.0
Conservative	B. Britten	1,068	41.3	+7.3
Conservative	H. Everitt	952	36.8	+0.2
Turnout		2,587	56.1	–23.6
Registered electors		4,611		
Alliance hold				
Alliance hold				
Alliance gain from Conservative				

No Labour candidates as previous (15.3%, 13.2%).

=== Bumpstead ===
Bumpstead
Party	Candidate	Votes	%	±%
Conservative	I. Knight	557	82.2	N/A
Labour	S. Giles	121	17.8	N/A
Majority		436	64.3	N/A
Turnout		678	48.1	N/A
Registered electors		1,410		
Conservative hold		Swing	N/A	

=== Castle Headingham ===
Castle Headingham
Party	Candidate	Votes	%	±%
Conservative	J. Poulton	Unopposed		
Registered electors		1,356		
Conservative hold				

=== Coggeshall ===
Coggeshall
Party	Candidate	Votes	%	±%
Conservative	D. Bellamy*	873	56.5	+8.0
Independent	W. Drake*	855	55.4	+3.0
Conservative	D. Burroughs	729	47.2	+0.1
Conservative	M. Trapp	691	44.8	+6.6
Alliance	P. Keeling	610	39.5	N/A
Alliance	C. Papworth	573	37.1	N/A
Alliance	D. Sibley	479	31.0	+0.7
Labour	T. Tant	348	22.5	–5.4
Turnout		1,544	40.6	–38.9
Registered electors		3,804		
Conservative hold				
Independent hold				
Conservative hold				

=== Colne Engaine & Greenstead Green ===
Colne Engaine & Greenstead Green
Party	Candidate	Votes	%	±%
Ind. Conservative	G. Courtauld*	586	85.3	N/A
Labour	M. Jarratt	101	14.7	N/A
Majority		485	70.6	N/A
Turnout		687	49.7	N/A
Registered electors		1,383		
Ind. Conservative hold		Swing	N/A	

=== Cressing ===
Cressing
Party	Candidate	Votes	%	±%
Conservative	L. Flint	302	51.3	+15.3
Alliance	R. Sweeting	152	25.8	–12.4
Labour	D. Green	135	22.9	N/A
Majority		150	25.5	N/A
Turnout		589	47.9	–28.7
Registered electors		1,229		
Conservative gain from Alliance		Swing	▲13.9	

No Independent candidate as previous (25.8%).

=== Earls Colne ===
Earls Colne
Party	Candidate	Votes	%	±%
Independent	C. Holmes*	Unopposed		
Independent	S. Boyce	Unopposed		
Registered electors		2,448		
Independent hold				
Independent hold				

=== Gosfield ===
Gosfield
Party	Candidate	Votes	%	±%
Independent	D. Marlow*	Unopposed		
Registered electors		1,081		
Independent hold				

=== Halstead Holy Trinity ===
Halstead Holy Trinity
Party	Candidate	Votes	%	±%
Residents	R. McDowell*	874	57.2	+2.3
Labour	R. Mayes*	860	56.2	+5.7
Labour	M. Fincken	660	43.2	+6.9
Labour	H. Gordon	548	35.8	–7.1
Conservative	J. Norfolk	534	34.9	–1.2
Conservative	J. Pike	502	32.8	+0.1
Alliance	T. Bird	376	24.6	N/A
Turnout		1,529	41.2	–37.2
Registered electors		3,711		
Residents hold				
Labour hold				
Labour hold				

=== Halstead St. Andrew's ===
Halstead St. Andrew's
Party	Candidate	Votes	%	±%
Residents	M. Gage*	996	72.5	+21.2
Conservative	J. Covell	692	50.4	+3.2
Conservative	C. Denton	431	31.4	+3.6
Alliance	D. Fuller	428	31.2	N/A
Turnout		1,373	44.7	–32.5
Registered electors		3,072		
Residents hold				
Conservative hold				

No Labour candidates as previous (27.8%, 24.3%).

=== Hatfield Peverel ===
Hatfield Peverel
Party	Candidate	Votes	%	±%
Independent	M. Voysey	662	42.2	N/A
Independent	D. Dyson	519	33.1	N/A
Conservative	K. Bigden	457	29.1	–35.5
Conservative	K. Lawrence	393	25.0	–36.8
Alliance	C. Livermore	332	21.1	N/A
Alliance	P. O'Brien	242	15.4	N/A
Labour	P. Cardy	188	12.0	–19.4
Labour	J. Brook	87	5.5	–24.0
Turnout		1,570	51.1	–25.9
Registered electors		3,072		
Independent gain from Conservative				
Independent gain from Conservative				

=== Kelvedon ===
Kelvedon
Party	Candidate	Votes	%	±%
Conservative	G. Clarke*	925	62.1	+13.4
Conservative	M. Edwards*	826	55.5	+4.2
Independent	J. Yule*	658	44.2	–0.8
Conservative	T. Sach	577	38.8	+3.0
Labour	I. Marshall	390	26.2	–3.2
Labour	D. Rogers	342	23.0	–5.8
Labour	J. Ness	275	18.5	–10.2
Alliance	H. Edwards	233	15.6	N/A
Alliance	J. Papworth	138	9.3	N/A
Alliance	K. Webb	102	6.9	N/A
Turnout		2,207	72.2	–8.1
Registered electors		3,057		
Conservative hold				
Conservative hold				
Independent hold				

=== Panfield ===
Panfield
Party	Candidate	Votes	%	±%
Conservative	M. Willey	Unopposed		
Registered electors		1,201		
Conservative hold				

=== Rayne ===
Rayne
Party	Candidate	Votes	%	±%
Conservative	T. Moore	540	51.2	–23.6
Alliance	T. Meadows	514	48.8	N/A
Majority		26	2.5	–47.2
Turnout		1,054	58.0	–21.4
Registered electors		1,817		
Conservative hold		Swing	N/A	

No Labour candidate as previous (25.8%).

=== Sible Headingham ===
Sible Headingham
Party	Candidate	Votes	%	±%
Independent	R. Tanner*	551	56.6	N/A
Conservative	J. Disley	422	43.4	N/A
Independent	J. Choppin	338	34.7	N/A
Independent	J. Brett	231	23.7	N/A
Independent	J. Waldron	212	21.8	N/A
Turnout		973	39.1	N/A
Registered electors		2,489		
Independent hold				
Conservative hold				

=== Stour Valley Central ===
Stour Valley Central
Party	Candidate	Votes	%	±%
Conservative	K. Nott*	Unopposed		
Registered electors		1,218		
Conservative hold				

=== Stour Valley North ===
Stour Valley North
Party	Candidate	Votes	%	±%
Conservative	M. Hall	Unopposed		
Registered electors		1,095		
Conservative hold				

=== Stour Valley South ===
Stour Valley South
Party	Candidate	Votes	%	±%
Conservative	J. Twinn	665	79.1	N/A
Labour	L. Hill	176	20.9	N/A
Majority		489	58.1	N/A
Turnout		841	54.6	N/A
Registered electors		1,541		
Conservative hold		Swing	N/A	

=== Terling ===
Terling
Party	Candidate	Votes	%	±%
Independent	G. Isted*	309	46.3	N/A
Conservative	B. Burtt	272	40.8	–33.3
Labour	K. Bates	86	12.9	–13.3
Majority		37	5.5	N/A
Turnout		667	53.0	–23.7
Registered electors		1,259		
Independent gain from Conservative		Swing	N/A	

=== Three Fields ===
Three Fields
Party	Candidate	Votes	%	±%
Conservative	R. Hawkins*	886	46.9	–10.7
Conservative	D. Platt*	698	37.0	–9.3
Independent	J. Finbow	658	34.9	–5.2
Labour	Y. Hennings	344	18.2	–12.3
Turnout		1,888	73.5	–5.5
Registered electors		2,569		
Conservative hold				
Conservative hold				

=== Upper Colne ===
Upper Colne
Party	Candidate	Votes	%	±%
Conservative	D. Johnson*	Unopposed		
Registered electors		1,253		
Conservative hold				

=== Witham Central ===
Witham Central
Party	Candidate	Votes	%	±%
Independent	H. Pitchforth*	420	47.8	–11.5
Conservative	J. Allan	330	37.6	+7.9
Labour	M. Sabin	82	9.3	–1.7
Independent	B. Farrow	46	5.2	N/A
Majority		90	10.3	–19.4
Turnout		878	54.1	–21.7
Registered electors		1,623		
Independent hold		Swing	▼9.7	

=== Witham Chipping Hill ===
Witham Chipping Hill
Party	Candidate	Votes	%	±%
Conservative	K. Richards*	585	40.8	–7.0
Conservative	V. Carpenter	504	35.1	–6.2
Labour	L. Randall	381	26.6	–25.5
Labour	K. Smith	337	23.5	–18.8
Alliance	A. Slowman*	240	16.7	N/A
Independent	S. Frost	228	15.9	N/A
Turnout		1,435	49.2	–28.3
Registered electors		2,916		
Conservative gain from Labour				
Conservative hold				

=== Witham North ===
Witham North
Party	Candidate	Votes	%	±%
Labour	G. Gyford	642	48.1	–3.6
Labour	I. Pointon	546	40.9	–8.3
Labour	M. Tracey	533	39.9	–7.6
Conservative	P. Collard	435	32.6	–11.0
Conservative	H. Scott	431	32.3	–10.1
Conservative	T. Stote	396	29.7	–9.2
Independent	R. Smith	259	19.4	N/A
Independent	F. Muffet	254	19.0	N/A
Independent	M. Canter	249	18.7	N/A
Turnout		1,335	36.0	–40.0
Registered electors		3,708		
Labour hold				
Labour hold				
Labour hold				

=== Witham Silver End & Rivenhall ===
Witham Silver End & Rivenhall
Party	Candidate	Votes	%	±%
Labour	J. Lyon*	944	64.1	+10.2
Labour	J. Evans*	919	62.4	+7.8
Conservative	P. Cutmore	530	36.0	–9.8
Conservative	J. Speakman	445	30.2	–10.2
Turnout		1,473	50.3	–30.3
Registered electors		2,929		
Labour hold				
Labour hold				

=== Witham South ===
Witham South
Party	Candidate	Votes	%	±%
Conservative	J. Pluthero	632	36.1	–3.5
Conservative	G. Gibbs	575	32.8	–4.7
Labour	K. Boylan*	540	30.8	–7.8
Labour	D. Sabin	528	30.1	–7.9
Independent	L. Hammond	366	20.9	N/A
Independent	B. Marsh	353	20.1	N/A
Alliance	D. Bigg	214	12.2	–8.2
Alliance	A. Bigg	158	9.0	–7.7
Turnout		1,753	42.8	–33.1
Registered electors		4,095		
Conservative hold				
Conservative gain from Labour				

=== Witham West ===
Witham West
Party	Candidate	Votes	%	±%
Conservative	M. Lager*	642	45.0	–10.5
Conservative	P. Gibbs*	589	41.3	–14.2
Labour	R. Pay	417	29.2	–12.8
Independent	J. Clark	367	25.7	N/A
Labour	E. Wilson	325	22.8	N/A
Turnout		1,427	47.3	–27.1
Registered electors		3,016		
Conservative hold				
Conservative hold				

No Communist candidate as previous (9.6%).

=== Yeldham ===
Yeldham
Party	Candidate	Votes	%	±%
Conservative	J. Yeldham*	Unopposed		
Registered electors		1,300		
Conservative hold				

== By-elections ==
=== Coggeshall ===
Coggeshall by-election: 8 September 1983
Party	Candidate	Votes	%	±%
Conservative		647	40.4	+7.9
Alliance		507	31.6	+8.9
Independent		251	15.7	N/A
Labour		197	12.3	–0.7
Majority		140	8.8	N/A
Turnout		1,602	54.0	–16.6
Registered electors		2,967		
Conservative hold		Swing	▼0.5	

=== Kelvedon ===
Kelvedon by-election: 10 November 1983
Party	Candidate	Votes	%	±%
Conservative		492	35.5	–6.4
Labour		429	31.0	+13.3
Other		246	17.8	N/A
Alliance		217	15.7	+5.1
Majority		63	4.5	N/A
Turnout		1,384	45.5	–26.7
Registered electors		3,042		
Conservative hold		Swing	▼9.9	

=== Black Notley ===
Black Notley by-election: 1 March 1984
Party	Candidate	Votes	%	±%
Alliance		491	51.8	+18.8
Conservative		400	42.2	–12.4
Labour		56	5.9	–6.5
Majority		91	9.6	N/A
Turnout		947	48.0	–0.6
Registered electors		1,973		
Alliance gain from Conservative		Swing	▲15.6	

=== Yeldham ===
Yeldham by-election: 13 December 1984
Party	Candidate	Votes	%	±%
Alliance		324	44.6	N/A
Conservative		219	30.2	N/A
Labour		183	25.2	N/A
Majority		105	14.4	N/A
Turnout		726	55.0	N/A
Registered electors		1,320		
Alliance gain from Conservative				

=== Castle Hedingham ===
Castle Hedingham by-election: 27 June 1985
Party	Candidate	Votes	%	±%
Alliance		249	51.0	N/A
Independent		239	49.0	N/A
Majority		10	2.0	N/A
Turnout		488	36.0	N/A
Registered electors		1,356		
Alliance gain from Conservative				

=== Witham West ===
Witham West by-election: 27 February 1986
Party	Candidate	Votes	%	±%
Labour		465	41.7	+12.5
Alliance		338	30.3	N/A
Conservative		311	27.9	–17.1
Majority		127	11.4	N/A
Turnout		1,114	36.0	–11.3
Registered electors		3,094		
Labour gain from Conservative				

=== Hatfield Peverel ===
Hatfield Peverel by-election: 16 October 1986
Party	Candidate	Votes	%	±%
Conservative		677	57.4	+28.3
Alliance		502	42.6	+21.4
Majority		175	14.8	N/A
Turnout		1,179	36.0	–15.1
Registered electors		3,275		
Conservative gain from Independent		Swing	▲3.5	
