= 1991 Braintree District Council election =

1991 UK local government election

← 1987	2 May 1991	1995 →

All 60 seats to Braintree District Council 31 seats needed for a majority

	First party	Second party	Third party
Party	Conservative	Labour	Liberal Democrats
Last election	30 seats, 42.6%	13 seats, 28.1%	5 seats, 18.7%
Seats won	23	21	6
Seat change	▼7	▲8	▲1
Popular vote	32,579	31,622	15,528
Percentage	37.1%	36.0%	17.7%
Swing	▼5.5%	▲7.9%	▼1.0%
	Fourth party	Fifth party
Party	Independent	Ratepayer
Last election	8 seats, 7.6%	N/A
Seats won	6	4
Seat change	▼2	▲4
Popular vote	3,819	3,043
Percentage	4.3%	3.5%
Swing	▼3.3%	N/A
- Winner in each seat at the 1991 Braintree District Council election
Council control before election
No overall control
Council control after election
No overall control

The 1991 Braintree District Council election took place on 2 May 1991 to elect members of Braintree District Council in England. This was on the same day as other local elections.

== Summary ==
=== Election result ===
1991 Braintree District Council election
Party	Seats	Gains	Losses	Net gain/loss	Seats %	Votes %	Votes	+/−
Conservative	23			▼7	38.3	37.1	32,579	-5.5
Labour	21			▲8	35.0	36.0	31,622	+7.9
Liberal Democrats	6			▲1	10.0	17.7	15,528	-1.0
Independent	6			▼2	10.0	4.3	3,819	-3.3
Ratepayer	4			▲4	6.7	3.5	3,043	N/A
Green	0			0	0.0	0.8	682	N/A
Independent Labour	0			0	0.0	0.7	650	N/A
Residents	0			▼4	0.0	0.0	0	-3.0

== Ward results ==
=== Black Notley ===
Black Notley
Party	Candidate	Votes	%	±%
Liberal Democrats	Turner P.	735	61.9	+10.5
Conservative	Goddard P.	363	29.8	−14.0
Labour	Shrivington M.	101	8.3	+3.5
Majority		372	32.1	+24.5
Turnout		1,199	50.1	−10.0
Liberal Democrats hold				

=== Bocking North ===
Bocking North
Party	Candidate	Votes	%	±%
Majority				
Turnout				
Registered electors				
	Labour hold			
	Labour hold			
	Labour hold			

=== Bocking South ===
Bocking South
Party	Candidate	Votes	%	±%
Majority				
Turnout				
Registered electors				
	Labour hold			
	Labour hold			
	Labour hold			

=== Braintree Central ===
Braintree Central
Party	Candidate	Votes	%	±%
Majority				
Turnout				
Registered electors				
	Labour hold			
	Labour hold			
	Labour hold			

=== Braintree East ===
Braintree East
Party	Candidate	Votes	%	±%
Majority				
Turnout				
Registered electors				
	Labour gain from Conservative			
	Conservative hold			
	Conservative hold			

=== Braintree West ===
Braintree West
Party	Candidate	Votes	%	±%
Majority				
Turnout				
Registered electors				
	Liberal Democrats hold			
	Liberal Democrats hold			
	Liberal Democrats hold			

=== Bumpstead ===
Bumpstead
Party	Candidate	Votes	%	±%
Majority				
Turnout				
Registered electors				
	Conservative hold	Swing		

=== Castle Headingham ===
Castle Headingham
Party	Candidate	Votes	%	±%
Majority				
Turnout				
Registered electors				
	Liberal Democrats hold	Swing		

=== Coggeshall ===
Coggeshall
Party	Candidate	Votes	%	±%
Majority				
Turnout				
Registered electors				
	Conservative hold			
	Independent hold			
	Conservative hold			

=== Colne Engaine & Greenstead Green ===
Colne Engaine & Greenstead Green
Party	Candidate	Votes	%	±%
Majority				
Turnout				
Registered electors				
	Conservative hold	Swing		

=== Cressing ===
Cressing
Party	Candidate	Votes	%	±%
Majority				
Turnout				
Registered electors				
	Conservative hold	Swing		

=== Earls Colne ===
Earls Colne
Party	Candidate	Votes	%	±%
Majority				
Turnout				
Registered electors				
	Independent hold			
	Independent hold			

=== Gosfield ===
Gosfield
Party	Candidate	Votes	%	±%
Majority				
Turnout				
Registered electors				
	Conservative hold	Swing		

=== Halstead Holy Trinity ===
Halstead Holy Trinity
Party	Candidate	Votes	%	±%
Majority				
Turnout				
Registered electors				
	Ratepayer gain from Residents			
	Labour hold			
	Ratepayer gain from Residents			

=== Halstead St. Andrew's ===
Halstead St. Andrew's
Party	Candidate	Votes	%	±%
Majority				
Turnout				
Registered electors				
	Ratepayer gain from Residents			
	Ratepayer gain from Residents			

=== Hatfield Peverel ===
Hatfield Peverel
Party	Candidate	Votes	%	±%
Majority				
Turnout				
Registered electors				
	Conservative hold			
	Independent gain from Conservative			

=== Kelvedon ===
Kelvedon
Party	Candidate	Votes	%	±%
Majority				
Turnout				
Registered electors				
	Conservative gain from Independent			
	Conservative hold			
	Conservative hold			

=== Panfield ===
Panfield
Party	Candidate	Votes	%	±%
Majority				
Turnout				
Registered electors				
	Independent hold	Swing		

=== Rayne ===
Rayne
Party	Candidate	Votes	%	±%
Majority				
Turnout				
Registered electors				
	Conservative hold	Swing		

=== Sible Headingham ===
Sible Headingham
Party	Candidate	Votes	%	±%
Majority				
Turnout				
Registered electors				
	Liberal Democrats gain from Independent			
	Conservative hold			

=== Stour Valley Central ===
Stour Valley Central
Party	Candidate	Votes	%	±%
Majority				
Turnout				
Registered electors				
	Conservative hold	Swing		

=== Stour Valley North ===
Stour Valley North
Party	Candidate	Votes	%	±%
Majority				
Turnout				
Registered electors				
	Conservative hold	Swing		

=== Stour Valley South ===
Stour Valley South
Party	Candidate	Votes	%	±%
Majority				
Turnout				
Registered electors				
	Conservative hold	Swing		

=== Terling ===
Terling
Party	Candidate	Votes	%	±%
Majority				
Turnout				
Registered electors				
	Conservative hold	Swing		

=== Three Fields ===
Three Fields
Party	Candidate	Votes	%	±%
Majority				
Turnout				
Registered electors				
	Conservative hold			
	Conservative hold			

=== Upper Colne ===
Upper Colne
Party	Candidate	Votes	%	±%
Majority				
Turnout				
Registered electors				
	Conservative hold	Swing		

=== Witham Central ===
Witham Central
Party	Candidate	Votes	%	±%
Majority				
Turnout				
Registered electors				
	Independent hold	Swing		

=== Witham Chipping Hill ===
Witham Chipping Hill
Party	Candidate	Votes	%	±%
Majority				
Turnout				
Registered electors				
	Labour gain from Conservative			
	Labour gain from Conservative			

=== Witham North ===
Witham North
Party	Candidate	Votes	%	±%
Majority				
Turnout				
Registered electors				
	Labour hold			
	Labour gain from Conservative			
	Labour gain from Conservative			

=== Witham Silver End & Rivenhall ===
Witham Silver End & Rivenhall
Party	Candidate	Votes	%	±%
Majority				
Turnout				
Registered electors				
	Labour hold			
	Labour hold			

=== Witham South ===
Witham South
Party	Candidate	Votes	%	±%
Majority				
Turnout				
Registered electors				
	Labour gain from Conservative			
	Labour gain from Conservative			

=== Witham West ===
Witham West
Party	Candidate	Votes	%	±%
Majority				
Turnout				
Registered electors				
	Labour gain from Conservative			
	Conservative hold			

=== Yeldham ===
Yeldham
Party	Candidate	Votes	%	±%
Majority				
Turnout				
Registered electors				
	Conservative hold	Swing		

== By-elections ==
=== Earls Colne ===
Earls Colne by-election: 5 December 1991
Party	Candidate	Votes	%	±%
Conservative		626	54.7	N/A
Independent		301	26.3	N/A
Liberal Democrats		218	19.0	N/A
Majority		325	28.4	N/A
Turnout		1,145	40.0	N/A
Registered electors		2,863		
Conservative gain from Independent				

=== Castle Hedingham ===
Castle Hedingham by-election: 6 October 1994
Party	Candidate	Votes	%	±%
Conservative		298	38.1	N/A
Liberal Democrats		260	33.2	N/A
Labour		225	28.7	N/A
Majority		38	4.9	N/A
Turnout		783	55.0	N/A
Registered electors		1,424		
Conservative gain from Liberal Democrats				
