= 1987 Braintree District Council election =

Braintree District Council election

← 1983	7 May 1987	1991 →

All 60 seats to Braintree District Council 31 seats needed for a majority

	First party	Second party	Third party
Party	Conservative	Labour	Independent
Last election	28 seats, 41.7%	16 seats, 28.2%	10 seats, 10.6%
Seats won	30	13	8
Seat change	▲2	▼3	▼2
Popular vote	36,990	24,392	6,615
Percentage	42.6%	28.1%	7.6%
Swing	▲0.9%	▼0.1%	▼3.0%
	Fourth party	Fifth party
Party	Alliance	Residents
Last election	3 seats, 16.0%	2 seats, 2.6%
Seats won	5	4
Seat change	▲2	▲2
Popular vote	16,215	2,613
Percentage	18.7%	3.0%
Swing	▲2.7%	▲0.4%
- Winner of each seat at the 1987 Braintree District Council election
Council control before election
No overall control
Council control after election
No overall control

The 1987 Braintree District Council election took place on 7 May 1987 to elect members of Braintree District Council in England. This was on the same day as other local elections.

== Summary ==
=== Election result ===
1987 Braintree District Council election
Party	Seats	Gains	Losses	Net gain/loss	Seats %	Votes %	Votes	+/−
Conservative	30	6	4	▲2	50.0	42.6	36,990	+0.9
Labour	13	0	3	▼3	21.7	28.1	24,392	–0.1
Independent	8	2	2	▼2	13.3	7.6	6,615	–3.0
Alliance	5	2	0	▲2	8.3	18.7	16,215	+2.7
Residents	4	2	0	▲2	6.7	3.0	2,613	+0.4
Ind. Conservative	0	0	1	▼1	0.0	0.0	0	–0.8

== Ward results ==
=== Black Notley ===
Black Notley
Party	Candidate	Votes	%	±%
Majority				
Turnout				
Registered electors				
	Alliance gain from Conservative	Swing		

=== Bocking North ===
Bocking North
Party	Candidate	Votes	%	±%
Majority				
Turnout				
Registered electors				
	Labour hold			
	Labour hold			
	Labour hold			

=== Bocking South ===
Bocking South
Party	Candidate	Votes	%	±%
Majority				
Turnout				
Registered electors				
	Labour hold			
	Labour hold			
	Labour hold			

=== Braintree Central ===
Braintree Central
Party	Candidate	Votes	%	±%
Majority				
Turnout				
Registered electors				
	Labour hold			
	Labour hold			
	Labour hold			

=== Braintree East ===
Braintree East
Party	Candidate	Votes	%	±%
Majority				
Turnout				
Registered electors				
	Conservative hold			
	Conservative hold			
	Conservative hold			

=== Braintree West ===
Braintree West
Party	Candidate	Votes	%	±%
Majority				
Turnout				
Registered electors				
	Alliance hold			
	Alliance hold			
	Alliance hold			

=== Bumpstead ===
Bumpstead
Party	Candidate	Votes	%	±%
Majority				
Turnout				
Registered electors				
	Conservative hold			

=== Castle Headingham ===
Castle Headingham
Party	Candidate	Votes	%	±%
Majority				
Turnout				
Registered electors				
	Alliance gain from Conservative	Swing		

=== Coggeshall ===
Coggeshall
Party	Candidate	Votes	%	±%
Majority				
Turnout				
Registered electors				
	Conservative hold			
	Independent hold			
	Conservative hold			

=== Colne Engaine and Greenstead Green ===
Colne Engaine & Greenstead Green
Party	Candidate	Votes	%	±%
Majority				
Turnout				
Registered electors				
	Conservative gain from Ind. Conservative	Swing		

=== Cressing ===
Cressing
Party	Candidate	Votes	%	±%
Majority				
Turnout				
Registered electors				
	Conservative hold	Swing		

=== Earls Colne ===
Earls Colne
Party	Candidate	Votes	%	±%
Majority				
Turnout				
Registered electors				
	Independent hold			
	Independent hold			

=== Gosfield ===
Gosfield
Party	Candidate	Votes	%	±%
Majority				
Turnout				
Registered electors				
	Independent hold	Swing		

=== Halstead Holy Trinity ===
Halstead Holy Trinity
Party	Candidate	Votes	%	±%
Majority				
Turnout				
Registered electors				
	Labour hold			
	Residents gain from Labour			
	Residents hold			

=== Halstead St. Andrew's ===
Halstead St. Andrew's
Party	Candidate	Votes	%	±%
Majority				
Turnout				
Registered electors				
	Residents gain from Conservative			
	Residents hold			

=== Hatfield Peverel ===
Hatfield Peverel
Party	Candidate	Votes	%	±%
Majority				
Turnout				
Registered electors				
	Conservative gain from Independent			
	Conservative gain from Independent			

=== Kelvedon ===
Kelvedon
Party	Candidate	Votes	%	±%
Majority				
Turnout				
Registered electors				
	Independent hold			
	Conservative hold			
	Conservative hold			

=== Panfield ===
Panfield
Party	Candidate	Votes	%	±%
Majority				
Turnout				
Registered electors				
	Independent gain from Conservative	Swing		

=== Rayne ===
Rayne
Party	Candidate	Votes	%	±%
Majority				
Turnout				
Registered electors				
	Conservative hold	Swing		

=== Sible Headingham ===
Sible Headingham
Party	Candidate	Votes	%	±%
Majority				
Turnout				
Registered electors				
	Independent hold			
	Conservative hold			

=== Stour Valley Central ===
Stour Valley Central
Party	Candidate	Votes	%	±%
Majority				
Turnout				
Registered electors				
	Conservative hold			

=== Stour Valley North ===
Stour Valley North
Party	Candidate	Votes	%	±%
Majority				
Turnout				
Registered electors				
	Conservative hold	Swing		

=== Stour Valley South ===
Stour Valley South
Party	Candidate	Votes	%	±%
Majority				
Turnout				
Registered electors				
	Conservative hold	Swing		

=== Terling ===
Terling
Party	Candidate	Votes	%	±%
Majority				
Turnout				
Registered electors				
	Conservative gain from Independent	Swing		

=== Three Fields ===
Three Fields
Party	Candidate	Votes	%	±%
Majority				
Turnout				
Registered electors				
	Conservative hold			
	Conservative hold			

=== Upper Colne ===
Upper Colne
Party	Candidate	Votes	%	±%
Majority				
Turnout				
Registered electors				
	Conservative hold	Swing		

=== Witham Central ===
Witham Central
Party	Candidate	Votes	%	±%
Majority				
Turnout				
Registered electors				
	Independent hold	Swing		

=== Witham Chipping Hill ===
Witham Chipping Hill
Party	Candidate	Votes	%	±%
Majority				
Turnout				
Registered electors				
	Conservative hold			
	Conservative hold			

=== Witham North ===
Witham North
Party	Candidate	Votes	%	±%
Majority				
Turnout				
Registered electors				
	Labour hold			
	Conservative gain from Labour			
	Conservative gain from Labour			

=== Witham Silver End and Rivenhall ===
Witham Silver End & Rivenhall
Party	Candidate	Votes	%	±%
Majority				
Turnout				
Registered electors				
	Labour hold			
	Labour hold			

=== Witham South ===
Witham South
Party	Candidate	Votes	%	±%
Majority				
Turnout				
Registered electors				
	Conservative hold			
	Conservative hold			

=== Witham West ===
Witham West
Party	Candidate	Votes	%	±%
Majority				
Turnout				
Registered electors				
	Conservative hold			
	Conservative hold			

=== Yeldham ===
Yeldham
Party	Candidate	Votes	%	±%
Majority				
Turnout				
Registered electors				
	Conservative hold	Swing		

== By-elections ==
=== Halstead St Andrews (1988) ===
Halstead St Andrews by-election: 3 March 1988
Party	Candidate	Votes	%	±%
Conservative		365	29.0	–1.6
Labour		293	23.3	+7.0
Independent		250	19.9	N/A
SLD		190	15.1	+2.8
Independent		159	12.6	N/A
Majority		72	5.7	N/A
Turnout		1,257	36.0	–11.3
Registered electors		3,492		
Conservative gain from Residents		Swing	▼4.3	

=== Witham Chipping Hill ===
Witham Chipping Hill by-election: 21 April 1988
Party	Candidate	Votes	%	±%
Labour		552	48.6	+18.0
Conservative		404	35.6	–2.7
SLD		179	15.8	–2.0
Majority		148	13.0	N/A
Turnout		1,135	37.0	–14.0
Registered electors		3,068		
Labour gain from Conservative		Swing	▲10.4	

=== Gosfield ===
Gosfield by-election: 9 June 1988
Party	Candidate	Votes	%	±%
Conservative		402	54.4	+29.9
SLD		337	45.6	N/A
Majority		65	8.8	N/A
Turnout		739	64.0	+6.3
Registered electors		1,155		
Conservative gain from Independent				

=== Colne Engaine & Greenstead Green ===
Colne Engaine & Greenstead Green by-election: 3 November 1988
Party	Candidate	Votes	%	±%
Conservative		302	74.2	–5.3
Labour		105	25.8	+5.3
Majority		197	48.4	N/A
Turnout		407	30.6	–23.1
Registered electors		1,330		
Conservative hold		Swing	▼5.3	

=== Sible Hedingham ===
Sible Hedingham by-election: 15 December 1988
Party	Candidate	Votes	%	±%
SLD		533	66.6	N/A
Conservative		267	33.4	–15.5
Majority		266	33.2	N/A
Turnout		800	31.4	–7.4
Registered electors		2,548		
SLD gain from Independent				

=== Halstead St Andrews (1989) ===
Halstead St Andrews by-election: 13 July 1989
Party	Candidate	Votes	%	±%
Labour		517	37.2	+20.9
Conservative		455	32.8	+2.2
Independent		225	16.2	N/A
SLD		191	13.8	+1.5
Majority		62	4.4	N/A
Turnout		1,388	38.0	–9.3
Registered electors		3,653		
Labour gain from Conservative		Swing	▲9.4	

=== Kelvedon ===
Kelvedon by-election: 1 March 1990
Party	Candidate	Votes	%	±%
Labour		605	35.0	+18.3
Conservative		574	33.2	–1.2
Independent		550	31.8	N/A
Majority		31	1.8	N/A
Turnout		1,729	48.0	–13.8
Registered electors		3,602		
Labour gain from Conservative		Swing	▲9.8	
