= 2011 Braintree District Council election =

Local election held in the United Kingdom

- 5 May 2011

All 60 seats 31 seats needed for a majority
	First party	Second party	Third party
Party	Conservative	Labour	Green
Last election	42	9	2
Seats before	42	9	2
Seats won	47	9	2
Seat change	▲5	Steady	Steady
Popular vote	24,115	13,479	5,465
Percentage	48.9%	27.4%	11.1%
Swing	▲2.1%	▲2.8%	▲3.9%
	Fourth party	Fifth party	Sixth party
Party	Independent	Halstead Residents	Liberal Democrats
Last election	1	5	1
Seats before	1	5	1
Seats won	1	1	0
Seat change	Steady	▼4	▼1
Popular vote	1,636	1,272	1,734
Percentage	3.3%	2.6%	3.5%
Swing	▼0.2%	▼0.9%	▼7.9%

The 2011 Braintree District Council Elections took place on 5 May 2011 to elect members of Braintree District Council in England. This was on the same day as other local elections. All 60 councillors in 30 wards were up for election.

== Summary ==
=== Results ===
Braintree District Council election result 2011
Party	Seats	Gains	Losses	Net gain/loss	Seats %	Votes %	Votes	+/−
Conservative	47	5	0	▲5	73.3	52.2	47,063	
Labour	9	1	1	Steady	16.7	31.3	28,186	
Green	2	0	0	Steady	3.3	7.5	6,788	
Halstead Residents	1	0	4	▼4	1.7	2.9	2,582	
Independent	1	0	0	Steady	1.7	2.1	1,927	
Liberal Democrats	0	0	1	▼1	0.0	2.3	2,082	
UKIP	0	0	0	Steady	0.0	1.6	1,440	
BNP	0	0	0	Steady	0.0	0.2	132	

== Ward results ==
=== Black Notley ===
Black Notley ward
Party	Candidate	Votes	%	±%
Conservative	Margaret Galione	789	55.8	
Conservative	Tom Cunningham	767	54.2	
Labour	Juliet Walton	231	16.3	
Labour	Andrew Bennett	217	15.3	
UKIP	David Hodges	200	14.1	
Independent	John Clark	163	11.5	
Liberal Democrats	David Toombs	149	10.5	
Green	Freddie Gerrard-Abbott	115	8.1	
Turnout		1,414	46.0	
Conservative hold				
Conservative hold				

=== Bocking Blackwater ===
Bocking Blackwater ward
Party	Candidate	Votes	%	±%
Conservative	Stephen Canning	1,243	50.1	
Conservative	Jean Schmitt	1,059	42.7	
Conservative	Vanessa Santomauro	999	40.2	
Labour	Agnes Bishop	796	32.1	
Labour	Allan Millam	623	25.1	
Labour	Richard Parsons	622	25.1	
UKIP	Gordan Helm	418	16.8	
Green	Simon Attwood	334	13.5	
Turnout		2,483	41.2	
Conservative hold				
Conservative hold				
Conservative hold				

=== Bocking North ===
Bocking North ward
Party	Candidate	Votes	%	±%
Labour	David Mann	709	49.4	
Labour	Anthony Everard	657	45.8	
Conservative	Timothy Wilkinson	493	34.3	
Conservative	Nigel McCrea	376	26.2	
UKIP	Michael Ford	215	15.0	
Green	Dawn Holmes	116	8.1	
Turnout		1,436	40.7	
Labour hold				
Labour hold				

=== Bocking South ===
Bocking South ward
Party	Candidate	Votes	%	±%
Conservative	Davis Baugh	701	46.9	
Labour	Moia Thorogood	689	46.1	
Labour	Lynn Watson	626	41.9	
Conservative	Abiodun Olumbori	508	34.0	
Green	John Malam	204	13.6	
Turnout		1,495	36.2	
Conservative hold				
Labour hold				

=== Bradwell, Silver End and Rivenhall ===
Bradwell, Silver End and Rivenhall ward
Party	Candidate	Votes	%	±%
Green	James Abbott	969	53.0	
Green	Bob Wright	689	37.7	
Labour	Jeremy White	422	23.1	
Labour	Daniel Wright	358	19.6	
Conservative	Stephen Nimmons	323	17.7	
UKIP	Brain Wood	284	15.5	
Conservative	Paul Ryland	266	14.6	
Turnout		1,828	49.8	
Green hold				
Green hold				

=== Braintree Central ===
Braintree Central ward
Party	Candidate	Votes	%	±%
Conservative	John McKee	1,123	47.7	
Conservative	Marlene Shepherd	957	40.6	
Conservative	Ronald Ramage	888	37.7	
Labour	Nigel Gibson	805	34.2	
Labour	Celia Burne	789	33.5	
Labour	William Edwards	734	31.2	
Green	Daniel Shadbolt	327	13.9	
UKIP	Roger Lord	323	13.7	
BNP	Paul Hooks	132	5.6	
Turnout		2,355	38.8	
Conservative hold				
Conservative hold				
Conservative gain from Labour				

=== Braintree East ===
Braintree East ward
Party	Candidate	Votes	%	±%
Labour	Elwyn Bishop	762	42.3	
Conservative	David Messer	759	42.2	
Labour	Colette Gibson	756	42.0	
Labour	Eric Lynch	710	39.4	
Conservative	Luke Harrington	691	38.4	
Conservative	Rikki Williams	668	37.1	
Green	Wendy Partridge	297	16.5	
Turnout		1,800	36.0	
Labour hold				
Conservative hold				
Labour hold				

=== Braintree South ===
Braintree South ward
Party	Candidate	Votes	%	±%
Conservative	Stephen Sandbrook	844	42.3	
Conservative	Lyn Walters	806	40.4	
Labour	Douglas Rice	780	39.1	
Labour	Gordon Currie	711	35.7	
Labour	Martin Green	709	35.6	
Conservative	Syedun Noor	605	30.3	
Independent	Andrew Beatty	408	20.5	
Green	Timothy Reeve	291	14.6	
Turnout		1,994	37.3	
Conservative gain from Liberal Democrats				
Conservative hold				
Labour hold				

=== Bumpstead ===
Bumpstead ward
Party	Candidate	Votes	%	±%
Conservative	Christopher Cadman	713	70.0	
Labour	Stephen Trumm	306	30.0	
Majority		407	40.0	
Turnout		1,035	51.3	
Conservative hold		Swing		

=== Coggeshall and North Feering ===
Coggeshall and North Feering ward
Party	Candidate	Votes	%	±%
Conservative	Patricia Newton	1,254	63.1	
Conservative	Susan Wilson	1,114	56.1	
Labour	Catherine Joyce	493	24.8	
Labour	Cherry Cornish	478	24.1	
Green	Stephanie Bills	289	14.6	
Turnout		1,986	50.0	
Conservative hold				
Conservative hold				

=== Cressing and Stisted ===
Cressing and Stisted ward
Party	Candidate	Votes	%	±%
Independent	Lynette Flint	600	76.9	
Labour	Greta Tew	180	23.1	
Majority		420	53.8	
Turnout		804	45.0	
Independent hold		Swing		

=== Gosfield and Greenstead Green ===
Gosfield and Greenstead Green ward
Party	Candidate	Votes	%	±%
Conservative	John O'Reilly-Cicconi	688	64.5	
Labour	Adrian Gibson	254	23.8	
Green	Howard Reed	124	11.6	
Majority		434	40.7	
Turnout		1,078	53.2	
Conservative hold		Swing		

=== Great Notley and Braintree West ===
Great Notley and Braintree West ward
Party	Candidate	Votes	%	±%
Conservative	Graham Butland	1,435	67.0	
Conservative	Claire Sandbrook	1,418	66.2	
Conservative	Roger Walters	1,211	56.5	
Labour	David Green	407	19.0	
Labour	Christina Bennett	362	16.9	
Labour	Stephen Goodfellow	306	14.3	
Green	Howard Bills	274	12.8	
Turnout		2,142	41.3	
Conservative hold				
Conservative hold				
Conservative hold				

=== Halstead St. Andrew's ===
Halstead St. Andrews ward
Party	Candidate	Votes	%	±%
Conservative	Jennifer Sutton	895	42.0	
Conservative	Julia Allen	827	38.8	
Conservative	Stephen Kirby	762	35.7	
Halstead Residents	David Hume	720	33.8	
Labour	Grahame McCoyd	573	26.9	
Halstead Residents	Kenneth Paisley	571	26.8	
Halstead Residents	Howard Messenger	405	19.0	
Labour	Stuart Gilbert	388	18.2	
Independent	Michael Gage	310	14.5	
Labour	Stuart Scrivens	297	13.9	
Independent	Beryl Gage	291	13.6	
Turnout		2,132	40.5	
Conservative gain from Halstead Residents				
Conservative gain from Halstead Residents				
Conservative gain from Halstead Residents				

=== Halstead Trinity ===
Halstead Trinity ward
Party	Candidate	Votes	%	±%
Halstead Residents	Jacqueline Pell	552	41.9	
Labour	Malcolm Fincken	456	34.6	
Labour	Stephen Knight	376	28.5	
Conservative	David Sharp	352	26.7	
Halstead Residents	Linda Hilton	334	25.4	
Conservative	Yvonne Warren	325	24.7	
Turnout		1,317	37.4	
Halstead Residents hold				
Labour gain from Halstead Residents				

=== Hatfield Peverel ===
Hatfield Peverel ward
Party	Candidate	Votes	%	±%
Conservative	David Beeb	1,062	65.3	
Conservative	Derrick Louis	981	60.3	
Labour	Lauren Whitnell	357	21,9	
Labour	Katherine Watts	288	17.7	
Green	Cheryl Gerrard	220	13.5	
Turnout		1,627	47.2	
Conservative hold				
Conservative hold				

=== Hedingham and Maplestead ===
Hedingham and Mapstead ward
Party	Candidate	Votes	%	±%
Conservative	Joanne Beavis	1,345	58.9	
Conservative	Hylton Johnson	1,197	52.4	
Conservative	Wendy Scattergood	1,044	45.7	
Liberal Democrats	Stephen Bolter	661	28.9	
Green	Susan Ransome	387	16.9	
Labour	Noel Owen	386	16.9	
Labour	John Kotz	350	15.3	
Labour	Betty Kotz	339	14.8	
Turnout		2,285	44.3	
Conservative hold				
Conservative hold				
Conservative hold				

=== Kelvedon ===
Kelvedon ward
Party	Candidate	Votes	%	±%
Conservative	Thomas Foster	1,202	60.4	
Conservative	Robert Mitchell	1,084	54.4	
Labour	Ian Marshall	537	27.0	
Labour	Anthony Lewis	508	25.5	
Green	Robert McCracken	280	14.1	
Turnout		1,991	50.4	
Conservative hold				
Conservative hold				

=== Panfield ===
Panfield ward
Party	Candidate	Votes	%	±%
Conservative	Peter Tattersley	522	64.8	
Labour	David Rice	183	22.7	
Green	Lynne Maynard	101	12.5	
Majority		339	42.1	
Turnout		816	47.8	
Conservative hold		Swing		

=== Rayne ===
Rayne ward
Party	Candidate	Votes	%	±%
Conservative	Michael Banthorpe	652	81.2	
Labour	Cornelius Coughlan	151	18.8	
Majority		501	62.4	
Turnout		817	46.8	
Conservative hold		Swing		

=== Stour Valley North ===
Stour Valley North ward
Party	Candidate	Votes	%	±%
Conservative	Julian Swift	686	76.0	
Labour	Robert Green	217	24.0	
Majority		469	52.0	
Turnout		915	51.1	
Conservative hold		Swing		

=== Stour Valley South ===
Stour Valley South ward
Party	Candidate	Votes	%	±%
Conservative	Anthony Shelton	711	78.6	
Labour	Frederick Hearn	194	21.4	
Majority		517	57.2	
Turnout		936	53.7	
Conservative hold		Swing		

=== Three Fields ===
Three Fields ward
Party	Candidate	Votes	%	±%
Conservative	John Finbow	1,125	71.1	
Conservative	David Reid	1,029	65.0	
Labour	Maureen Bennett	343	21.7	
Labour	Cynthia Woodhouse	298	18.8	
Turnout		1,582	50.3	
Conservative hold				
Conservative hold				

=== Upper Colne ===
Upper Colne ward
Party	Candidate	Votes	%	±%
Conservative	Robert Bolton	599	73.3	
Labour	Peter Long	218	26.7	
Majority		381	46.6	
Turnout		834	48.6	
Conservative hold		Swing		

=== Witham Chipping Hill and Central ===
Witham Chipping Hill and Central ward
Party	Candidate	Votes	%	±%
Conservative	Sandra Howell	662	44.2	
Conservative	Michael Lager	652	43.5	
Labour	Francis MacDonald	396	26.4	
Labour	Eileen Davidson	382	25.5	
Liberal Democrats	Barry Fleet	296	19.7	
Liberal Democrats	Helen Waring	181	12.1	
Green	Nelson Brunton	176	11.7	
Turnout		1,499	41.7	
Conservative hold				
Conservative hold				

=== Witham North ===
Witham North ward
Party	Candidate	Votes	%	±%
Labour	Robert Evans	613	46.7	
Labour	Philip Barlow	603	45.9	
Conservative	Christopher Thompson	422	32.1	
Conservative	John Cunningham	363	27.6	
Green	Robert Nicholls	246	18.7	
Liberal Democrats	Clifford Livermore	158	12.0	
Turnout		1,314	38.0	
Labour hold				
Labour hold				

=== Witham South ===
Witham South ward
Party	Candidate	Votes	%	±%
Conservative	Janet Money	997	46.1	
Conservative	Corrine Thompson	937	43.3	
Conservative	John Elliott	930	43.0	
Labour	Paul Heath	719	33.2	
Labour	Olatunde Biyi	713	32.9	
Labour	Alan O'Shea	672	31.0	
Green	Agnes Wells	352	16.3	
Green	Stephen Hicks	290	13.4	
Liberal Democrats	Bernard Dearlove	239	11.0	
Turnout		2,165	34.3	
Conservative hold				
Conservative hold				
Conservative hold				

=== Witham West ===
Witham West ward
Party	Candidate	Votes	%	±%
Conservative	William Rose	841	41.4	
Conservative	Patrick Horner	824	40.6	
Conservative	Cheryl Louis	736	36.2	
Labour	Lucy Barlow	697	34.3	
Labour	Anthony Bennett	649	32.0	
Labour	Kathleen Tearle	640	31.5	
Green	Andrew Bunn	362	17.8	
Green	Philip Hughes	345	17.0	
Liberal Democrats	James Fleet	231	11.4	
Liberal Democrats	Pamela Hooper	167	8.2	
Turnout		2,031	40.4	
Conservative hold				
Conservative hold				
Conservative hold				

=== Yeldham ===
Yeldham ward
Party	Candidate	Votes	%	±%
Conservative	Iona Parker	426	58.2	
Independent	Trevor Revell	155	21.2	
Labour	Richard Green	151	20.6	
Majority		271	37.0	
Turnout		735	44.9	
Conservative hold		Swing		

== By-elections ==
=== Braintree East (March 2012) ===
A by-election was called due to the resignation of Cllr David Messer (Conservative).

Braintree East: 15 March 2012
Party	Candidate	Votes	%	±%
Labour	Eric Lynch	554	49.0	+7.1
Conservative	Stephen Nimmons	338	29.9	−11.8
UKIP	Phil Palij	131	11.6	N/A
Green	Wendy Partridge	76	6.7	−9.6
Independent	Paul Lemon	32	2.8	N/A
Majority		216	19.1	N/A
Turnout		1,131		
Labour gain from Conservative		Swing	▲9.5	

=== Braintree South ===
A by-election was called due to the resignation of Cllr Stephen Sandbrook (Conservative).

Braintree South: 15 March 2012
Party	Candidate	Votes	%	±%
Labour	Martin Green	596	50.2	+16.6
Conservative	Abi Olumbori	476	40.1	+3.8
Green	Timothy Reeve	116	9.8	−2.7
Majority		120	10.1	N/A
Turnout		1,188		
Labour gain from Conservative		Swing	▲6.4	

=== Great Notley and Braintree West ===
A by-election was called due to the resignation of Cllr Claire Sandbrook (Conservative).

Great Notley and Braintree West: 15 March 2012
Party	Candidate	Votes	%	±%
Conservative	Frankie Ricci	532	54.3	−13.5
Labour	Juliet Walton	232	23.7	+4.5
UKIP	Gordon Helm	155	15.8	N/A
Green	Lynne Maynard	61	6.2	−6.7
Majority		300	30.6	N/A
Turnout		980		
Conservative hold		Swing	▼9.0	

=== Braintree East (July 2013) ===
A by-election was called due to the death of Cllr Eric Lynch (Labour). Percentage changes compared to the 2012 by-election.

Braintree East: 25 July 2013
Party	Candidate	Votes	%	±%
Labour	Celia Burne	461	46.6	−2.4
Conservative	Jennifer Smith	267	27.0	−2.9
UKIP	Philip Palij	194	19.6	+8.0
Green	John Malam	67	6.8	+0.1
Majority		194	19.6	+0.5
Turnout		989		
Labour hold		Swing	▲0.3	
