= 2003 Braintree District Council election =

2003 UK local government election

- 1 May 2003

59 seats to Braintree District Council 30 seats needed for a majority

	First party	Second party	Third party
Party	Conservative	Labour	Residents
Last election	17 seats, 29.0%	31 seats, 45.2%	N/A
Seats won	27	20	5
Seat change	▲10	▼11	▲5
Popular vote	24,265	22,840	4,542
Percentage	35.7%	33.6%	6.7%
Swing	▲6.7%	▼11.6%	N/A
	Fourth party	Fifth party	Sixth party
Party	Liberal Democrats	Green	Independent
Last election	3 seats, 13.8%	2 seats, 4.1%	4 seats, 4.8%
Seats won	4	2	2
Seat change	▲1	Steady	▼2
Popular vote	8,509	4,064	3,658
Percentage	12.5%	6.0%	5.6%
Swing	▼1.3%	▲1.9%	▲0.6%
Council control before election
Labour
Council control after election
No overall control

The 2003 Braintree District Council election took place on 1 May 2003 to elect members of Braintree District Council in England. This was on the same day as other local elections.

== Summary ==
=== Results ===
2003 Braintree District Council election
Party	Seats	Gains	Losses	Net gain/loss	Seats %	Votes %	Votes	+/−
Conservative	27			▲10	45.0	35.7	24,265	+6.7
Labour	20			▼11	33.3	33.6	22,840	-11.6
Residents	5			▲5	8.3	6.7	4,542	New
Liberal Democrats	4			▲1	6.7	12.5	8,509	-1.3
Green	2			Steady	3.3	6.0	4,064	+1.9
Independent	2			▼2	3.3	5.4	3,658	+0.6
Residents	0			▼3	0.0	—	—	-3.0

== Ward results ==
=== Black Norley & Terling ===
Black Norley & Terling
Party	Candidate	Votes	%
Liberal Democrats	P. Turner	504	39.3
Conservative	M. Gallone	501	39.0
Liberal Democrats	J. Turner	449	35.0
Conservative	C. Louis	377	29.4
Labour	M. Williams	201	15.7
Labour	R. Horrell	151	11.8
Turnout		1,283	44.0
Liberal Democrats win (new seat)			
Conservative win (new seat)			

=== Bocking Blackwater ===
Bocking Blackwater
Party	Candidate	Votes	%
Conservative	J. Schmitt	733	44.3
Conservative	D. Reid	713	43.1
Conservative	R. Haslam	701	42.4
Labour	A. Bishop	647	39.1
Labour	R. Lodge	572	34.6
Labour	M. Shirvington	527	31.9
Liberal Democrats	S. Seymour	321	19.4
Liberal Democrats	T. Graystone	278	16.8
Green	W. Partridge	222	13.4
Turnout		1,653	27.8
Conservative win (new seat)			
Conservative win (new seat)			
Conservative win (new seat)			

=== Bocking North ===
Bocking North
Party	Candidate	Votes	%	±%
Labour	D. Mann	496	54.1	−15.2
Labour	A. Everard	450	49.1	−13.2
Conservative	T. McMillan	300	32.7	N/A
Conservative	P. Walsh	275	30.0	+2.1
Liberal Democrats	E. Fierheller	155	16.9	±0.0
Turnout		917	27.5	−0.4
Labour hold				
Labour hold				

=== Bocking South ===
Bocking South
Party	Candidate	Votes	%	±%
Labour	L. Green	566	61.3	−2.8
Labour	M. Thorogood	536	58.1	−8.6
Conservative	N. Birks	297	32.2	+3.7
Conservative	A. Scattergood	222	24.1	−5.2
Green	D. Stewart	145	15.7	+7.6
Turnout		923	24.6	−1.2
Labour hold				
Labour hold				

=== Bradwell, Silver End & Rivenhall ===
Bradwell, Silver End & Rivenhall
Party	Candidate	Votes	%
Green	James Abbott	855	58.3
Green	Philip Hughes	755	51.5
Labour	G. Tew	434	29.6
Labour	M. Cann	399	27.2
Liberal Democrats	A. Final	178	12.1
Liberal Democrats	B. French	170	11.6
Turnout		1,466	40.2
Green win (new seat)			
Green win (new seat)			

=== Braintree Central ===
Braintree Central
Party	Candidate	Votes	%	±%
Liberal Democrats	R. Cavinder	487	36.6	+18.8
Labour	M. Green	476	35.7	−20.8
Labour	W. Edwards	466	35.0	−19.8
Labour	D. Lotery	452	33.9	−17.0
Conservative	J. Brown	451	33.9	+11.1
Conservative	J. McKee	446	33.5	+11.3
Liberal Democrats	R. McDermott	390	29.3	+13.0
Liberal Democrats	J. Fish	387	29.1	+11.3
Independent	B. Buchan	344	25.8	N/A
Independent	R. Green	256	19.2	N/A
Green	D. Darney	133	10.0	+0.9
Turnout		1,332	25.0	+3.6
Liberal Democrats gain from Labour				
Labour hold				
Labour hold				

=== Braintree East ===
Braintree East
Party	Candidate	Votes	%	±%
Labour	E. Bishop	597	52.0	−3.2
Labour	E. Lynch	531	46.3	−0.9
Labour	C. Coughlan	502	43.7	−2.8
Conservative	D. McIntosh	304	26.5	−0.6
Independent	L. Clark	254	22.1	N/A
Independent	M. Buchan	228	19.9	N/A
Liberal Democrats	P. Lemon	219	19.1	−1.8
Liberal Democrats	P. Brooks	216	18.8	−3.2
Turnout		1,148	25.7	+5.4
Labour hold				
Labour hold				
Labour hold				

=== Braintree South ===
Braintree South
Party	Candidate	Votes	%
Labour	M. Lynch	611	46.8
Labour	A. Millam	563	43.1
Liberal Democrats	D. Rice	528	40.4
Labour	R. Parsons	520	39.8
Conservative	D. Messer	371	28.4
Conservative	H. Rix	337	25.8
Green	D. Andrews	187	14.3
Turnout		1,306	25.9
Labour win (new seat)			
Labour win (new seat)			
Liberal Democrats win (new seat)			

=== Bumpstead ===
Bumpstead
Party	Candidate	Votes	%	±%
Conservative	J. Collar	534	71.0	+10.1
Labour	A. Bennett	218	29.0	−10.1
Turnout		752	39.7	+7.0
Conservative hold		Swing	▲10.1	

=== Coggeshall & North Feering ===
Coggeshall & North Feering
Party	Candidate	Votes	%
Conservative	P. Newton	767	48.2
Conservative	N. Edey	738	46.4
Labour	C. Joyce	640	40.2
Labour	T. Layzell	598	37.6
Liberal Democrats	D. Sibley	231	14.5
Green	M. Langsdon	172	10.8
Turnout		1,591	41.0
Conservative win (new seat)			
Conservative win (new seat)			

=== Cressing & Stisted ===
Cressing & Stisted
Party	Candidate	Votes	%
Independent	L. Flint	353	55.9
Conservative	D. Heasman	279	44.1
Majority		74	11.8
Turnout		632	28.0
Independent win (new seat)			

=== Gosfield & Greenstead Green ===
Gosfield & Greenstead Green
Party	Candidate	Votes	%
Conservative	B. Broyd	531	55.1
Independent	R. Waters	294	30.5
Labour	D. Marshall	138	14.3
Majority		237	24.6
Turnout		963	48.0
Conservative win (new seat)			

=== Great Notley & Braintree West ===
Great Notley & Braintree West
Party	Candidate	Votes	%
Conservative	G. Butland	862	60.4
Conservative	A. Jenner	794	55.6
Conservative	R. Walters	767	53.7
Liberal Democrats	L. Beckett	341	23.9
Liberal Democrats	P. Braley	316	22.1
Liberal Democrats	T. Brooks	304	21.3
Independent	A. Watts	192	13.4
Labour	L. Barlow	168	11.8
Labour	B. Tate	158	11.1
Labour	A. Tearle	141	9.9
Turnout		1,428	32.1
Conservative win (new seat)			
Conservative win (new seat)			
Conservative win (new seat)			

=== Halstead St. Andrew's ===
Halstead St. Andrew's
Party	Candidate	Votes	%	±%
Residents	M. Gage	1,042	70.3	N/A
Residents	B. Gage	1,037	70.0	N/A
Residents	H. Catley	1,029	69.4	N/A
Labour	G. McCoyd	377	25.4	−0.5
Labour	T. Rogers	372	25.1	−4.6
Labour	S. Gilbert	346	23.3	N/A
Turnout		1,482	28.5	−4.2
Residents gain from Residents				
Residents gain from Residents				
Residents win (new seat)				

=== Halstead Trinity ===
Halstead Trinity
Party	Candidate	Votes	%
Residents	J. Pell	822	77.3
Residents	J. Pilgrim	612	57.6
Labour	M. Fincken	362	34.1
Labour	S. Knight	344	32.4
Turnout		1,063	30.0
Residents win (new seat)			
Residents win (new seat)			

=== Hatfield Peverel ===
Hatfield Peverel
Party	Candidate	Votes	%	±%
Conservative	K. Bigden	806	76.7	+19.8
Conservative	D. Finch	684	65.1	+9.3
Labour	P. Watt	257	24.5	−5.1
Labour	V. Bermudez	225	21.4	+1.0
Turnout		1,051	30.5	−0.6
Conservative hold				
Conservative hold				

=== Headingham & Maplestead ===
Headingham & Maplestead
Party	Candidate	Votes	%
Conservative	J. Beavis	1,013	61.8
Conservative	C. Tanner	924	56.3
Conservative	W. Scattergood	710	43.3
Liberal Democrats	S. Bolter	542	33.0
Labour	N. Owen	332	20.2
Independent	P. Schwier	310	18.9
Labour	S. Goodfellow	259	15.8
Labour	K. Tew	199	12.1
Turnout		1,640	32.9
Conservative win (new seat)			
Conservative win (new seat)			
Conservative win (new seat)			

=== Kelvedon ===
Kelvedon
Party	Candidate	Votes	%	±%
Conservative	T. Foster	732	41.9	+4.1
Conservative	R. Mitchell	655	37.5	+2.7
Labour	E. Davidson	592	33.9	−10.5
Labour	I. Marshall	579	33.1	−11.3
Independent	J. Hackworth	387	22.2	N/A
Independent	B. Boyer	300	17.2	N/A
Liberal Democrats	M. Ashby	198	11.3	−0.7
Turnout		1,747	45.0	+3.1
Conservative gain from Labour				
Conservative gain from Labour				

=== Panfield ===
Panfield
Party	Candidate	Votes	%	±%
Conservative	T. Wilkinson	421	70.8	+14.3
Labour	R. Green	174	29.2	−14.3
Turnout		595	36.0	−5.0
Conservative hold		Swing	▲14.3	

=== Rayne ===
Rayne
Party	Candidate	Votes	%	±%
Liberal Democrats	A. Meadows	369	50.8	−3.8
Conservative	E. Macnee	358	49.2	+17.4
Majority		11	1.6	−21.2
Turnout		727	43.2	+10.8
Liberal Democrats hold		Swing	▼10.6	

=== Stour Valley North ===
Stour Valley North
Party	Candidate	Votes	%	±%
Conservative	N. Harley	447	62.7	−2.6
Liberal Democrats	M. Posen	136	19.1	N/A
Labour	P. Owen	130	18.2	−16.5
Majority		311	43.6	+13.0
Turnout		713	41.2	+4.5
Conservative hold		Swing	N/A	

=== Stour Valley South ===
Stour Valley South
Party	Candidate	Votes	%	±%
Conservative	A. Shelton	498	73.1	+8.8
Labour	F. Hearn	183	26.9	+7.9
Majority		315	46.2	+0.9
Turnout		681	37.0	−5.3
Conservative hold		Swing	▲0.5	

=== The Three Colnes ===
The Three Colnes
Party	Candidate	Votes	%
Independent	B. Gaught	740	60.3
Conservative	G. Spray	658	53.6
Labour	R. Alston	314	25.6
Labour	S. Overnell	305	24.8
Turnout		1,228	32.2
Independent win (new seat)			
Conservative win (new seat)			

=== Three Fields ===
Three Fields
Party	Candidate	Votes	%	±%
Conservative	J. Finbow	800	72.2	+3.7
Conservative	S. Walsh	783	70.7	+0.1
Labour	A. Axtell	230	20.8	−2.6
Labour	J. Overnell	221	19.9	−6.0
Turnout		1,108	36.5	+1.8
Conservative hold				
Conservative hold				

=== Upper Colne ===
Upper Colne
Party	Candidate	Votes	%	±%
Conservative	R. Bolton	450	67.0	−3.6
Liberal Democrats	E. Jones	132	19.6	N/A
Labour	P. Long	90	13.4	−16.0
Majority		318	47.4	+6.2
Turnout		672	34.0	−8.4
Conservative hold		Swing	N/A	

=== Witham Chipping Hill & Central ===
Witham Chipping Hill & Central
Party	Candidate	Votes	%
Labour	P. Barlow	443	36.8
Conservative	M. Lager	443	36.8
Labour	I. Pointon	372	30.9
Liberal Democrats	B. Fleet	363	30.1
Liberal Democrats	C. May	268	22.3
Green	N. Brunton	255	21.2
Turnout		1,204	33.0
Labour win (new seat)			
Conservative win (new seat)			

=== Witham North ===
Witham North
Party	Candidate	Votes	%	±%
Labour	R. Evans	462	55.5	−14.6
Labour	J. Gyford	435	52.3	−15.6
Conservative	C. Heasman	215	25.8	+3.7
Liberal Democrats	D. Barber	157	18.9	N/A
Green	N. Scales	138	16.6	+1.1
Green	C. Gerrard	115	13.8	+2.0
Turnout		832	22.8	−0.7
Labour hold				
Labour hold				

=== Witham South ===
Witham South
Party	Candidate	Votes	%	±%
Labour	J. Martin	583	43.7	−10.4
Labour	P. Heath	574	43.0	N/A
Labour	R. Tincknell	521	39.0	−9.8
Conservative	J. Jarvis	515	38.6	+13.4
Conservative	R. Ramage	498	37.3	+12.7
Conservative	D. Louis	469	35.1	N/A
Liberal Democrats	B. Dearlove	219	16.4	+0.2
Liberal Democrats	C. Gerrard	194	14.5	+1.1
Green	S. Ransome	178	13.3	+6.1
Turnout		1,335	27.8	+6.1
Labour hold				
Labour hold				
Labour win (new seat)				

=== Witham West ===
Witham West
Party	Candidate	Votes	%	±%
Labour	K. Boylan	564	44.7	N/A
Labour	K. Tearle	546	43.2	−6.6
Labour	J. Reekle	533	42.2	−6.9
Conservative	J. Walton	426	33.7	+3.7
Green	S. Hicks	314	24.9	+16.0
Green	P. Brunton	297	23.5	+14.6
Liberal Democrats	P. Hooper	294	23.3	+9.0
Green	K. Peterson	253	20.0	+11.1
Turnout		1,263	24.8	−5.1
Labour hold				
Labour hold				
Labour win (new seat)				

=== Yeldham ===
Yeldham
Party	Candidate	Votes	%	±%
Conservative	N. McCrea	245	42.5	N/A
Labour	S. Scrivens	168	29.2	N/A
Liberal Democrats	T. Ellis	163	28.3	N/A
Majority		77	13.3	N/A
Turnout		576	36.5	N/A
Conservative gain from Labour		Swing	N/A	

== By-elections ==
=== Hedingham and Maplestead ===
Hedingham and Maplestead: 11 March 2004
Party	Candidate	Votes	%	±%
Liberal Democrats		664	45.8	+21.1
Conservative		625	43.1	−3.0
Labour		160	11.0	−4.1
Majority		39	2.7	N/A
Turnout		1,449		
Liberal Democrats gain from Conservative		Swing	▲12.1	

=== Rayne ===
Rayne: 14 October 2004
Party	Candidate	Votes	%	±%
Conservative		289	49.5	+0.3
Liberal Democrats		272	46.6	−4.2
Green		23	3.9	N/A
Majority		17	2.9	N/A
Turnout		584		
Conservative gain from Liberal Democrats		Swing	▲2.3	
