= Jennifer C. Ward (historian) =

British historian

Jennifer C. Ward was a British historian who was a specialist in medieval women and the history of Essex and East Anglia.

Ward was a former senior lecturer in history at Goldsmiths College, University of London.

== Selected publications ==
- The estates of the Clare family, 1066-1317, University of London, London, 1962.
- The de Bohun charter of Saffron Walden, Saffron Walden Historical Society, 1986. ISBN 0951129104
- The Essex Gentry and the County Community in the Fourteenth Century, Essex Record Office, 1991. ISBN 0900360860 (Studies in Essex History)
- English Noblewomen in the Later Middle Ages, Routledge, 1992. (Medieval World Series)
- Women of the English Nobility and Gentry, 1066-1500, Manchester University Press, Manchester, 1995. (Manchester Medieval Studies) ISBN 978-0719041143
- Women in Medieval Europe: 1200-1500, Routledge, London, 2002. ISBN 0582288274 (Longman History of European Women)
- Brentwood: a history, Phillimore, Chichester, 2004. ISBN 9781860772795
- Women in England in the Middle Ages, Bloomsbury Academic, London, 2006. ISBN 978-1852853464
- Elizabeth de Burgh, Lady of Clare (1295-1360), Boydell Press, 2014. (Suffolk Records Society Book 57) ISBN 978-1843838913
