= Julia Crick =

British historian, medievalist and academic

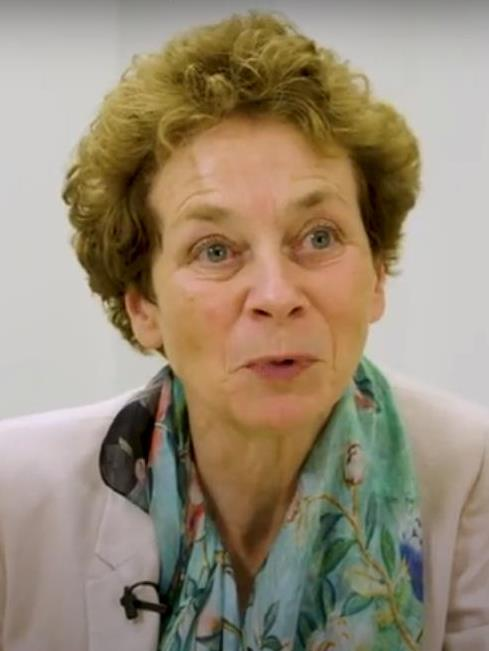
Julia Crick (2018)

Julia Catherine Crick (born 1963) is a British historian, medievalist, and academic. She is Professor of Palaeography and Manuscript Studies at King's College London.

== Academic career ==
Studying at Gonville and Caius College, Cambridge, Crick completed the tripos in Anglo-Saxon, Norse and Celtic in 1985.

Crick began her career as a tutor and Fellow of Gonville and Caius. In 1992, she joined the University of Exeter as a lecturer in the Department of History and Archaeology. She was promoted to senior lecturer in 2001 and to associate professor in 2007. She has maintained her links with the university as an honorary university fellow.

In September 2012, Crick moved to King's College London where she had been appointed Professor of Palaeography and Manuscript Studies. From 2013 to 2017, she was Director of the Centre for Late Antique and Medieval Studies.

Crick specialises in medieval palaeography, medieval perceptions of the past, the history of medieval Britain to 1200 and land and power in Anglo-Saxon England. She sits on the editorial boards of Arthurian Literature and Anglo-Saxon, and was formerly on the board of Early Medieval Europe.

On 21 March 2019, Crick was elected a Fellow of the Society of Antiquaries of London (FSA), while in 2021 she was made a Fellow of the British Academy.

== Selected publications ==
- Crick, Julia; van Houts, E. M. C. (2011). A Social History of England, 900–1200. Cambridge: Cambridge University Press. ISBN 978-1-13950-085-2.
- Crick, J. C. (2007). Charters of St. Albans (Vol. XIII). Oxford: Oxford University Press for the British Academy.
- Crick, J., & Walsham, A. M. (2004, paperback edn 2010). The Uses of Script and Print 1300–1700. Cambridge: Cambridge University Press.
- Crick, J. C. (1991). The Historia regum Britannie of Geoffrey of Monmouth, IV. Dissemination and reception in the later Middle Ages (Vol. IV). Cambridge: D. S. Brewer.
- Crick, J. C. (1989). The Historia regum Britannie of Geoffrey of Monmouth, III. A Summary Catalogue of the Manuscripts (Vol. III). Cambridge: D. S. Brewer.
