= Manchester Medieval Studies =

Manchester Medieval Studies is a series of books on medieval history published by Manchester University Press. The series is intended for the non-specialist reader and attempts to combine traditional scholarship with the latest academic approaches to the subjects covered.

== Titles ==
This is an incomplete list of titles in the series:

- Hamilton, Louis I. A sacred city: Consecrating churches and reforming society in eleventh-century Italy. ISBN 978-0-7190-8026-5
- Poleg, Eyal. Approaching the Bible in medieval England. ISBN 978-0-7190-8954-1
- Rigby, S.H. Chaucer in context: Society, allegory and gender. ISBN 978-0-7190-4236-2
- Radulescu, Raluca, Alison Truelove (Eds.) Gentry culture in late-medieval England. ISBN 978-0-7190-6825-6
- L'Estrange, Elizabeth. Holy motherhood: Gender, dynasty and visual culture in the later middle ages. ISBN 978-0-7190-8726-4
- Veach, Colin. Lordship in four realms: The Lacy family, 1166–1241. ISBN 978-0-7190-8937-4
- Musson, Anthony. Medieval law in context: The growth of legal consciousness from Magna Carta to the Peasants' Revolt. ISBN 978-0-7190-5494-5
