= Raluca Radulescu =

Raluca L. Radulescu FLSW is professor of medieval literature at Bangor University. She is a specialist in Arthurian and non-Arthurian romances including Sir Thomas Malory and pious romances, medieval chronicles, political culture and gentry studies.

Radulescu received her BA at the University of Bucharest and her MPhil and PhD at the University of Manchester. She has held fellowships at New Europe College, Institute for Advanced Studies, (Bucharest), Maison des Sciences de l’Homme (Paris) and the Huntington Library (as Andrew Mellon fellow).

In 2018, Radulescu was elected a Fellow of the Learned Society of Wales.

== Selected publications ==
- "Sir Thomas Malory and Fifteenth-Century Political Ideas", Arthuriana 13:3 (2003), 36-51.
- The Gentry Context for Malory’s Morte Darthur. Cambridge: D. S. Brewer, 2003.
- "Malory’s Lancelot and the Key to Salvation", Arthurian Literature 25 (2008), 93-118.
- Broken Lines: Genealogical Literature in Medieval Britain and France, co-ed. with Edward Donald Kennedy, Medieval Texts and Cultures of Northern Europe 16. Turnhout: Brepols, 2008. Includes own chapter, "Genealogy in Insular Romance", pp. 7–25.
- Romance and Its Contexts in Fifteenth-century England: Politics, Piety and Penitence. Cambridge: D. S. Brewer, 2013. ISBN 9781843843597
