= Elisabeth van Houts =

Dutch-British historian (born 1952)

Elisabeth Maria Cornelia van Houts, Lady Baker, (born 1952) is a Dutch-born British historian specializing in medieval European history. Van Houts was born in Zaandam in the Netherlands. She married historian Sir John Baker in 2010.

Van Houts is an honorary professor of medieval European history in the Faculty of History and a Fellow of Emmanuel College, Cambridge.

Van Houts was elected a Fellow of the Royal Historical Society in 1983. She has published and lectured on Anglo-Norman history, medieval historiography and literature and the history of gender in the Middle Ages. She has been an expert panellist on the radio programme In Our Time for the 12th-century Renaissance and the Domesday Book. She was elected a Fellow of the British Academy in 2024.

== Selected publications ==
- Van Houts, Elisabeth M. C. (2019). Married Life in the Middle Ages, 900-1300. Oxford: Oxford University Press. ISBN 9780198798897.
- Crick, Julia; van Houts, E. M. C. (2011). A Social History of England, 900-1200. Cambridge: Cambridge University Press. ISBN 978-1-13950-085-2.
- Harper-Bill, Christopher; Van Houts, Elisabeth M. C. (2003). A Companion to the Anglo-Norman World. Woodbridge: Boydell. ISBN 9780851156736.
- Van Houts, Elisabeth Maria Cornelia (2001). Medieval Memories: men, women and the past in Europe, 700–1300. Women and Men in History. Longman. ISBN 9780582369023.
- Van Houts, Elisabeth Maria Cornelia (2000). The Normans in Europe. Manchester Medieval Sources. Manchester: Manchester University Press. ISBN 9780719047510.
- Van Houts, Elisabeth M. C. (1999). Memory and Gender in Medieval Europe, 900–1200. Basingstoke: Macmillan. ISBN 9780333568583.
- Van Houts, Elisabeth M. C. (1995). Local and Regional Chronicles. Typologie des sources du Moyen Age occidental. Vol. 74. Turnhout: Brepols. ISBN 2503360009.
