= Essex Record Office =

County record office in Essex, England

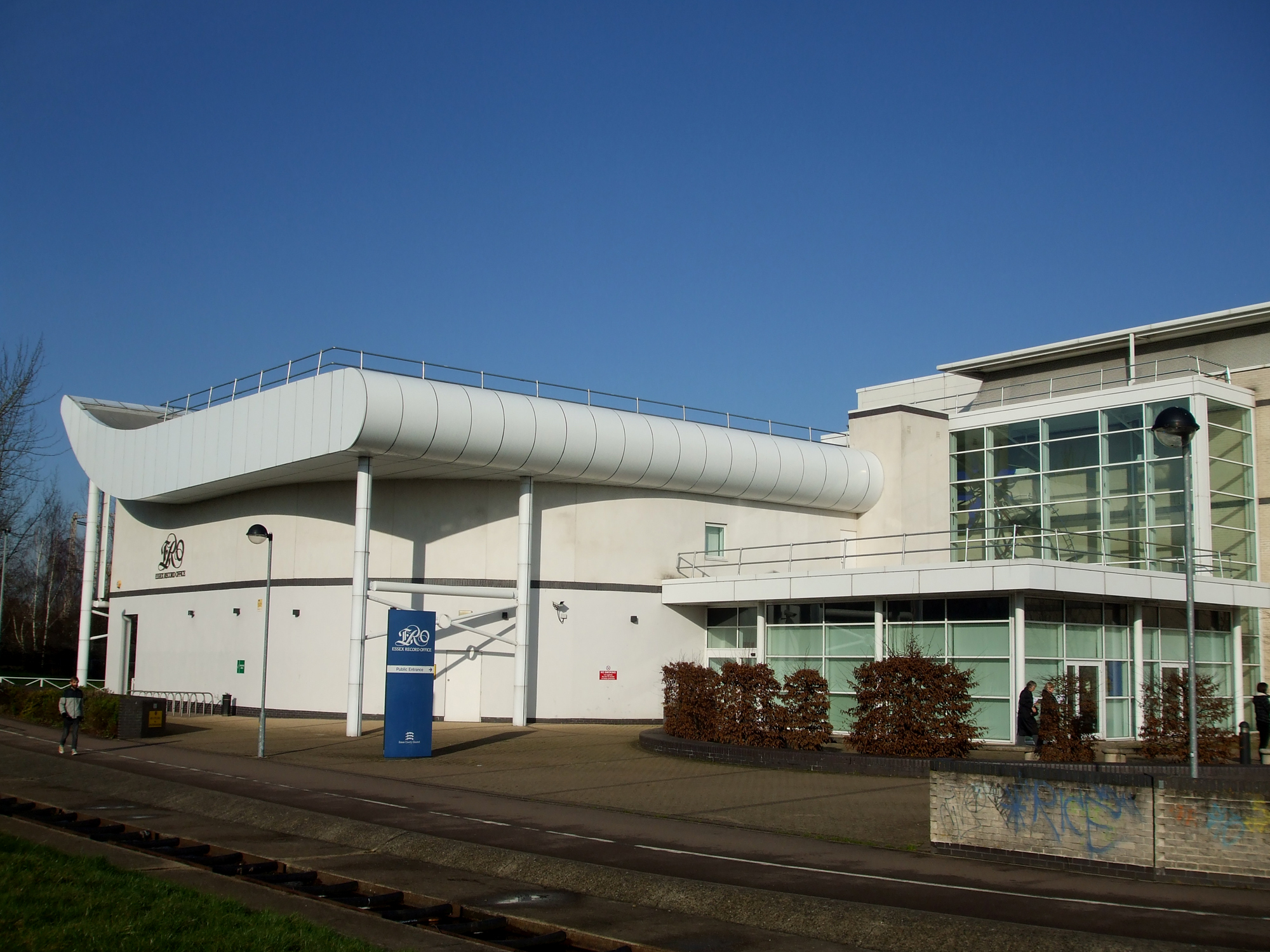
Essex Record Office, Chelmsford

The Essex Record Office is the repository for records about the county of Essex in England. The office is run by Essex County Council. A searchable database of the records held at the office is available on a system called Seax.

The Record Office was previously held within County Hall, Chelmsford, before being transferred to a specially built premises on Wharf Road beside River Chelmer. Since 2015 the Record Office has produced duplicate birth, marriage, and death certificates for the registration district of Essex.

== History ==
The Essex Record Office was founded in 1938 by Essex County Council, with F.G. Emmison appointed as the first County Archivist. The initial collection of muniments in 1939 included Court Rolls, Parish Records, Deeds, and Charters. On account of sparse storage space by 1997, plans were made by Essex County Council for a new Record Office facility, to accommodate increasing numbers of document accessions, whilst also being equipped with a purpose built sound archive, conservation studio, lecture theatre, and seminar spaces.

== Selected publications ==
- Brown, Arthur Frederick James. (1982) Chartism in Essex and Suffolk. ISBN 0900360623
- Brown, Arthur Frederick James. (1990) Meagre Harvest: The Essex Farm Workers' Struggle Against Poverty, 1750-1914. ISBN 0900360771
- Brown, Arthur Frederick James. (1996) Prosperity and Poverty: Rural Essex, 1700-1815. ISBN 1898529086
- Fisher, John. (2003) A Medieval Farming Glossary of Latin and English Words. ISBN 1898529213
- Briggs, Nancy R. (1991) John Johnson, 1732-1814: Georgian Architect and County Surveyor of Essex, ISBN 0900360828
- Ward, Jennifer C. (1991) The Essex Gentry and the County Community in the Fourteenth Century. ISBN 0900360860 (Studies in Essex History)
- Grieve, Hilda. (1954) Examples of English Handwriting 1150-1750. ISBN 0900360313
- Benham, Hervey. (1993) Essex Gold: Fortunes of the Essex Oysterman. ISBN 0900360925
- Phillips, Andrew. (1998) Ten Men and Colchester. ISBN 0900360658
- Hunter, John. (1999) The Essex Landscape: A Study of Its Form and History. ISBN 1898529159
- Lidell, Sue and Bill. (1996) Imagined Land: Essex in poetry and prose. ISBN 1898529108
- Spalding, Fred & Jarvis, Stan. (1996) The World of Fred Spalding: Photographs of Essex 1860-1940. ISBN 1898529078
- Smith, J.R. (1987) The Speckled Monster: Smallpox in England, 1670-1970, with particular reference to Essex. ISBN 0900360682
- Smith, J.R. (1992) Pilgrims & Adventurers: Essex (England) and the making of the United States of America. ISBN 0900360909
- Benham, Hervey. (1986) The Smugglers' Century: The Story of smuggling on the Essex Coast, 1730-1830. ISBN 0900360674
- Rusiecki, Paul. (2008) The Impact of Catastrophe: The people of Essex and the First World War (1914-1920) ISBN 9781898529286
- Hussey, Stephen (2000) Headline History: One hundred years of Essex history from the pages of the Essex Chronicle newspaper. ISBN 1898529167
