= Arthurian Literature (book series) =

Arthurian Literature is a book series published annually since 1982 by Boydell & Brewer.

Richard Barber, founder of The Boydell Press (later Boydell & Brewer), was the editor until volume 11, with co-editors on some volumes. Volumes XIX to XXIII were edited by Keith Busby and Roger Dalrymple. In 2006, Norris J. Lacy described Boydell & Brewer as "surely the most energetic publishers of Arthurian translations (as well as studies and editions)". The editors of the 32nd volume, to be published in 2015, are Elizabeth Archibald and David F. Johnson.

As originally published, the series included long articles on the literary, historic, and artistic aspects of Arthurian legend in Europe in the medieval and early modern periods. It now also includes shorter pieces of up to 5000 words that are published in a "Notes" section. Notes and Queries described it as "An indispensable component of any historical or Arthurian library".

Supplements to The New Arthurian Encyclopedia have been issued with each volume.
