= Mill Road Halt railway station =

Former railway station in England

Coordinates: 51.9243°N 0.2444°E

Mill Road Halt
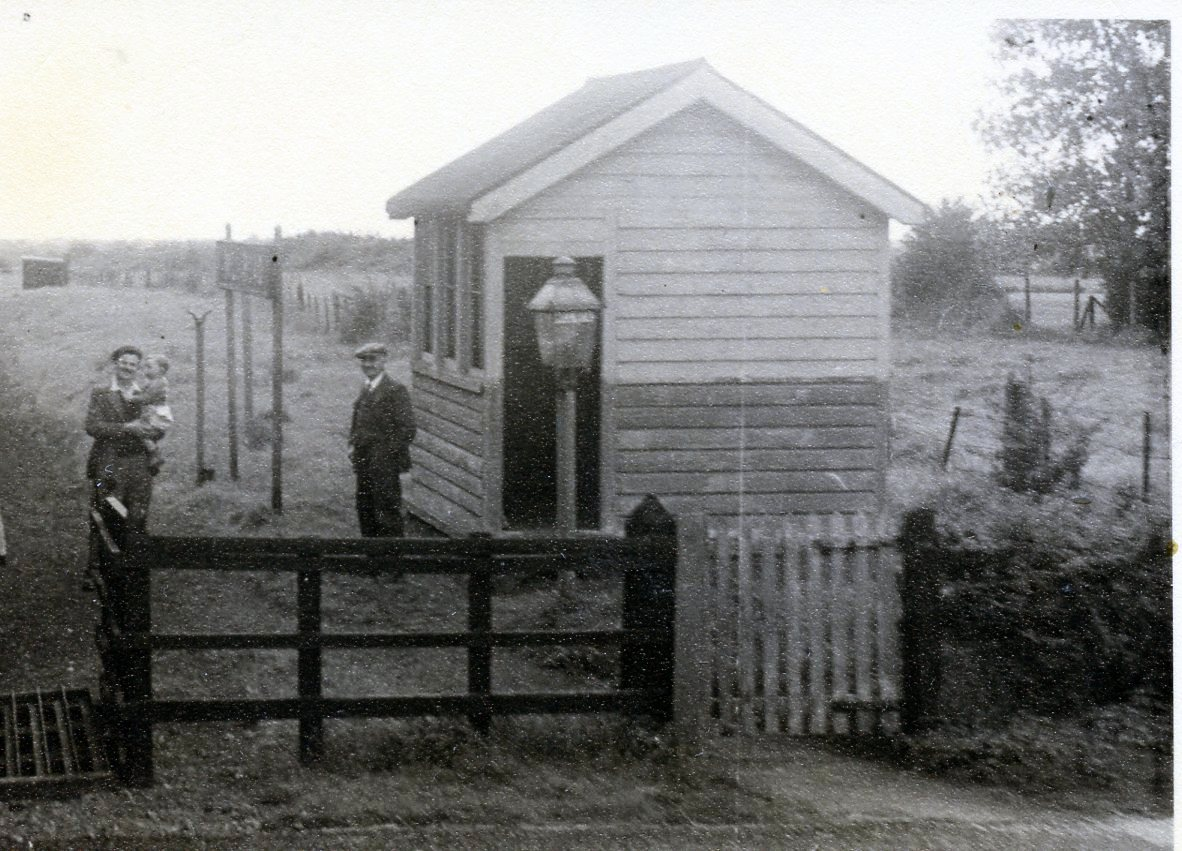
- The station in 1952

General information
- Location: Henham, Essex; England
- Platforms: 1

Other information
- Status: Disused

History
- Original company: Elsenham and Thaxted Light Railway
- Pre-grouping: Elsenham and Thaxted Light Railway
- Post-grouping: London and North Eastern Railway

Key dates
- 18 December 1922: Opened
- 15 September 1952: Closed
Location

Mill Road Halt railway station was a station between Elsenham and Henham in Essex. It was located 70 chains (1.41 km) from Elsenham station. It closed in 1952.

Preceding station	Disused railways	Following station
Elsenham	Elsenham and Thaxted Light Railway	Henham Halt
