= Henham Halt railway station =

Train station in England

Coordinates: 51.9316°N 0.2577°E

Henham Halt
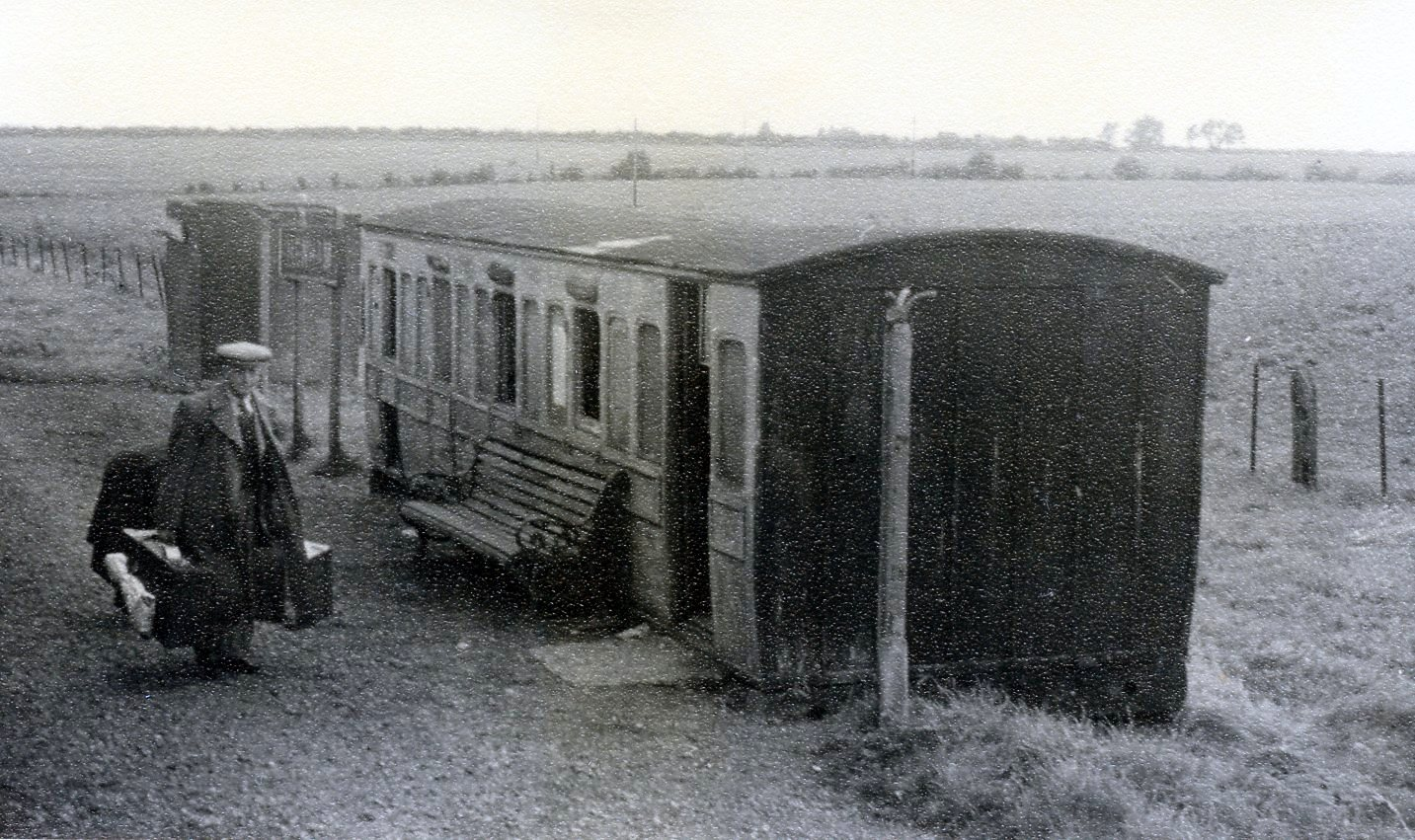
- The station in 1952

General information
- Location: Henham, Essex; England
- Platforms: 1

Other information
- Status: Disused

History
- Original company: Elsenham and Thaxted Light Railway
- Pre-grouping: Elsenham and Thaxted Light Railway
- Post-grouping: London and North Eastern Railway

Key dates
- 1 April 1913: Opened
- 15 September 1952: Closed
Location

Henham Halt railway station was a station serving the village of Henham, Essex, England, on the Elsenham and Thaxted Light Railway. It was located 1 mile 57 chains (2.76 km) from Elsenham station. It closed in 1952. The single platform was built of clinker and ash, with an old coach body used as a shelter.

== Impact and legacy ==
A video game map called Whistle based on this station was added to the CS2 Wingman mode.

Preceding station	Disused railways	Following station
Mill Road Halt	Elsenham and Thaxted Light Railway	Sibleys
