= Thaxted (disambiguation) =

Thaxted may refer to:

- Thaxted, a town in the Uttlesford district, Essex, England
  - Thaxted railway station, a station serving the village of Thaxted, Essex
- "Thaxted" (tune), a hymn tune by Gustav Holst, a resident of Thaxted
