= Cutlers Green =

Hamlet in Essex, England

Coordinates: 51.9522°N 0.3226°E

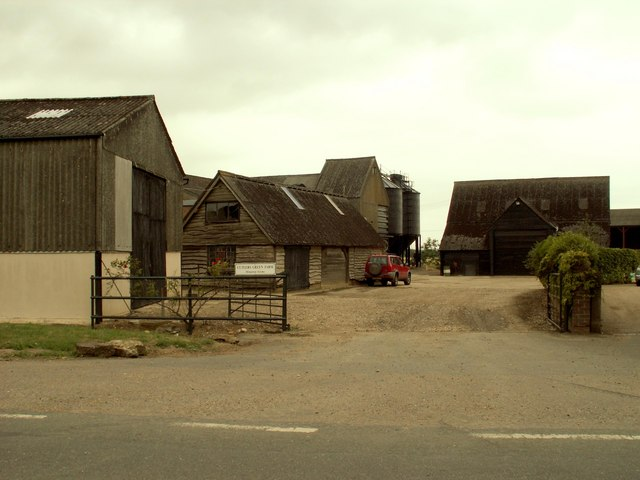
- Cutlers Green Farm with 17th-century barn

- Location within Essex
- OS grid reference: TL595307
- Civil parish: Thaxted
- District: Uttlesford
- Shire county: Essex
- Region: East
- Country: England
- Sovereign state: United Kingdom
- Post town: Dunmow
- Postcode district: CM6
- Police: Essex
- Fire: Essex
- Ambulance: East of England

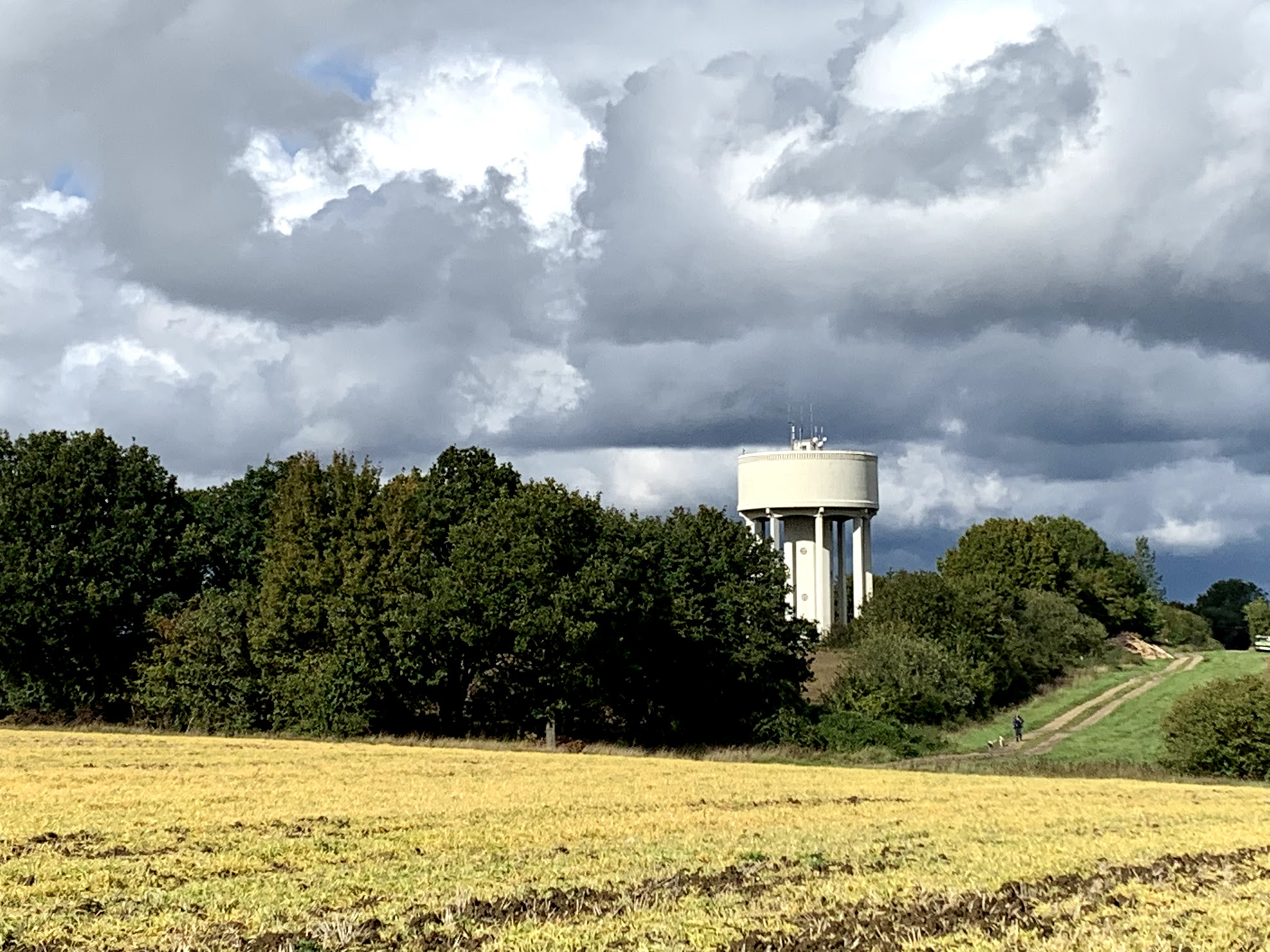
Cutlers Green Water Tower, near Thaxted, Essex

Cutlers Green is a hamlet in the civil parish of Thaxted, and the Uttlesford district of Essex, England. The hamlet is 1 mile (1.6 km) west from the town of Thaxted.

The name of the hamlet is reminiscent of the cutlery industry which developed in Thaxted in the late Middle Ages. According to a Thaxted vicar, the remains of forges were found at Cutlers Green in the nineteenth century.

The common land at the centre of the hamlet once belonged to the manor of Horham Hall, which lies one mile to the south. It was gifted by the lord of the manor and owner of the Hall, Mr. Sandy Shand, to Thaxted Parish Council in the 1978, which maintains it as a public common.

There was a station on the Elsenham and Thaxted Light Railway named Cutlers Green Halt from 1913 until the line closed to passengers on 15 September 1952.

A water tower at Cutlers Green was constructed in 1938 to supply the Thaxted area.

Several buildings in Cutlers Green are Grade II listed, including Richmond's in the Wood farmhouse, which dates to the fourteenth century, several other farmhouses and cottages ranging from the sixteenth to the eighteenth centuries and a seventeenth century timber-framed and weatherboarded barn,

There was once a public house - the Oak Beer House - which was tied to a brewery in Stansted Mountfichet and closed in 1925. There are currently no retail premises operating in the hamlet.
