= Ambrose Thomas =

Ambrose Thomas may refer to:

- Ambrose Thomas (artist) (1880–1959), English artist
- Ambroise Thomas (1811–1896), French composer
