= Sibleys railway station =

Former railway station in England

Coordinates: 51.9456°N 0.2753°E

Sibleys
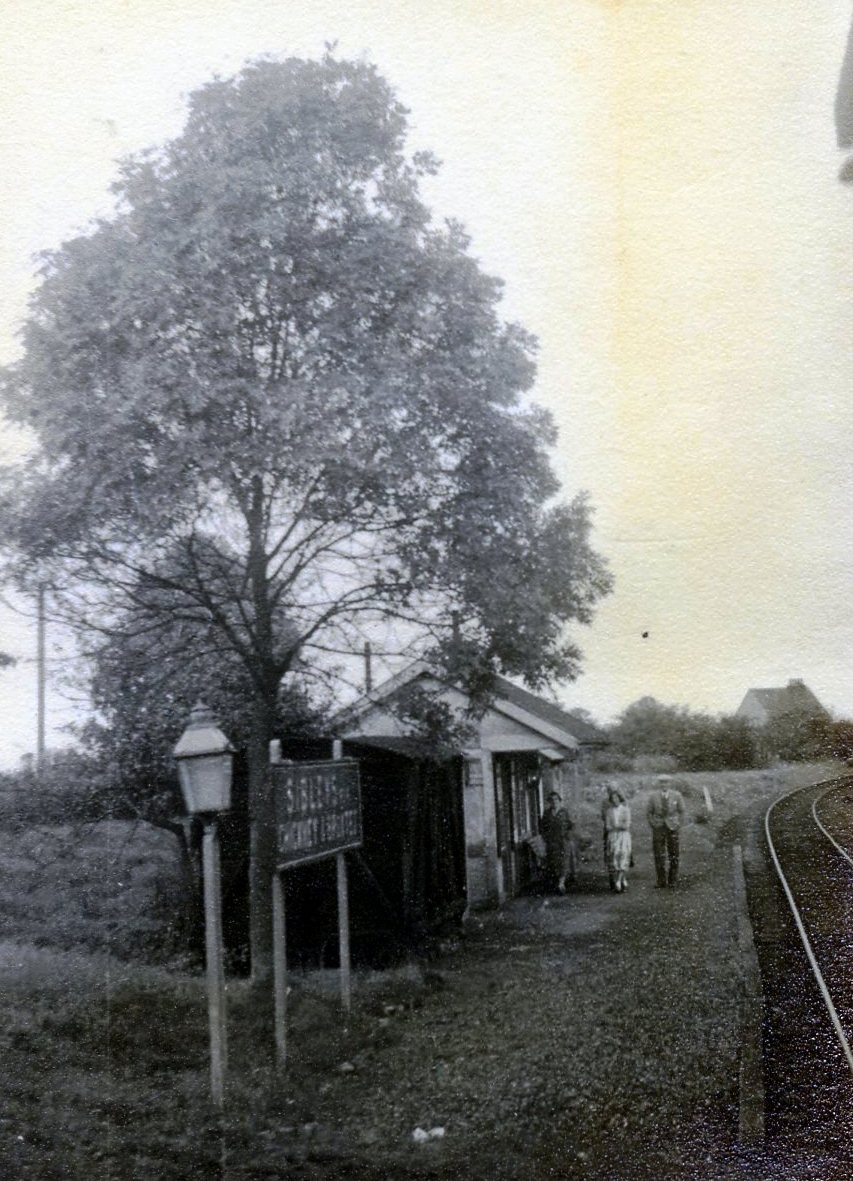
- The station in 1952

General information
- Location: Essex; England
- Platforms: 1

Other information
- Status: Disused

History
- Original company: Elsenham and Thaxted Light Railway
- Pre-grouping: Elsenham and Thaxted Light Railway
- Post-grouping: London and North Eastern Railway

Key dates
- 1 April 1913: Opened
- 15 September 1952: Closed to passengers
- 1 June 1953: Closed to goods
Location

Sibleys railway station was a station between Hamperden End and Woodend Green, in the civil parish of Chickney, Essex. It was located 2 miles 78 chains (4.79 km) from Elsenham station. It closed for passengers in 1952.

Preceding station	Disused railways	Following station
Henham Halt	Elsenham and Thaxted Light Railway	Cutlers Green Halt
