= Cutlers Green Halt railway station =

Former railway station in England

Coordinates: 51.9464°N 0.3141°E

Cutlers Green
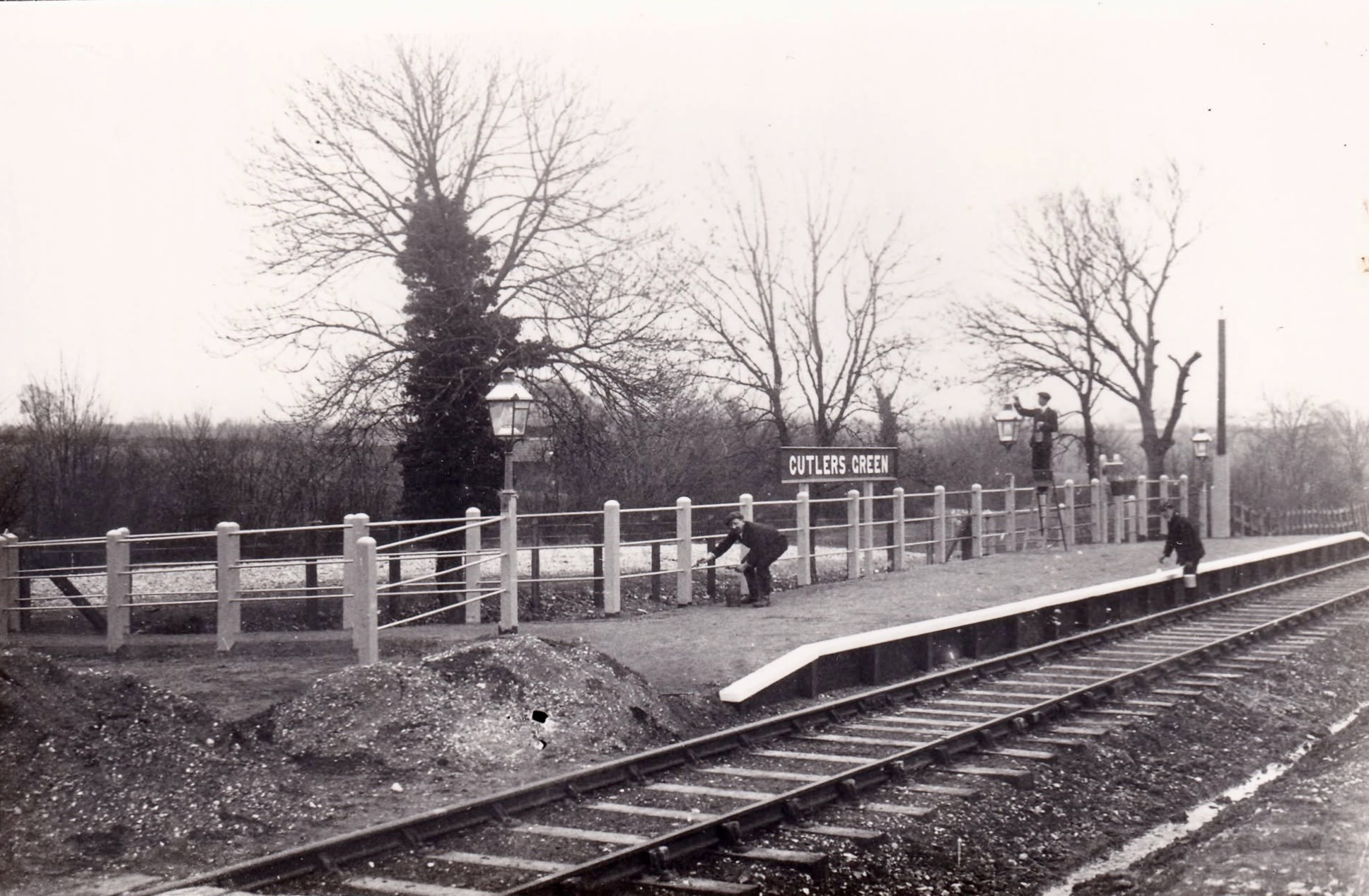
- Station probably in the 1910s

General information
- Location: Cutlers Green, Essex; England
- Platforms: 1

Other information
- Status: Disused

History
- Original company: Elsenham and Thaxted Light Railway
- Pre-grouping: Elsenham and Thaxted Light Railway
- Post-grouping: London and North Eastern Railway

Key dates
- 1 April 1913: Opened
- 15 September 1952: Closed
Location

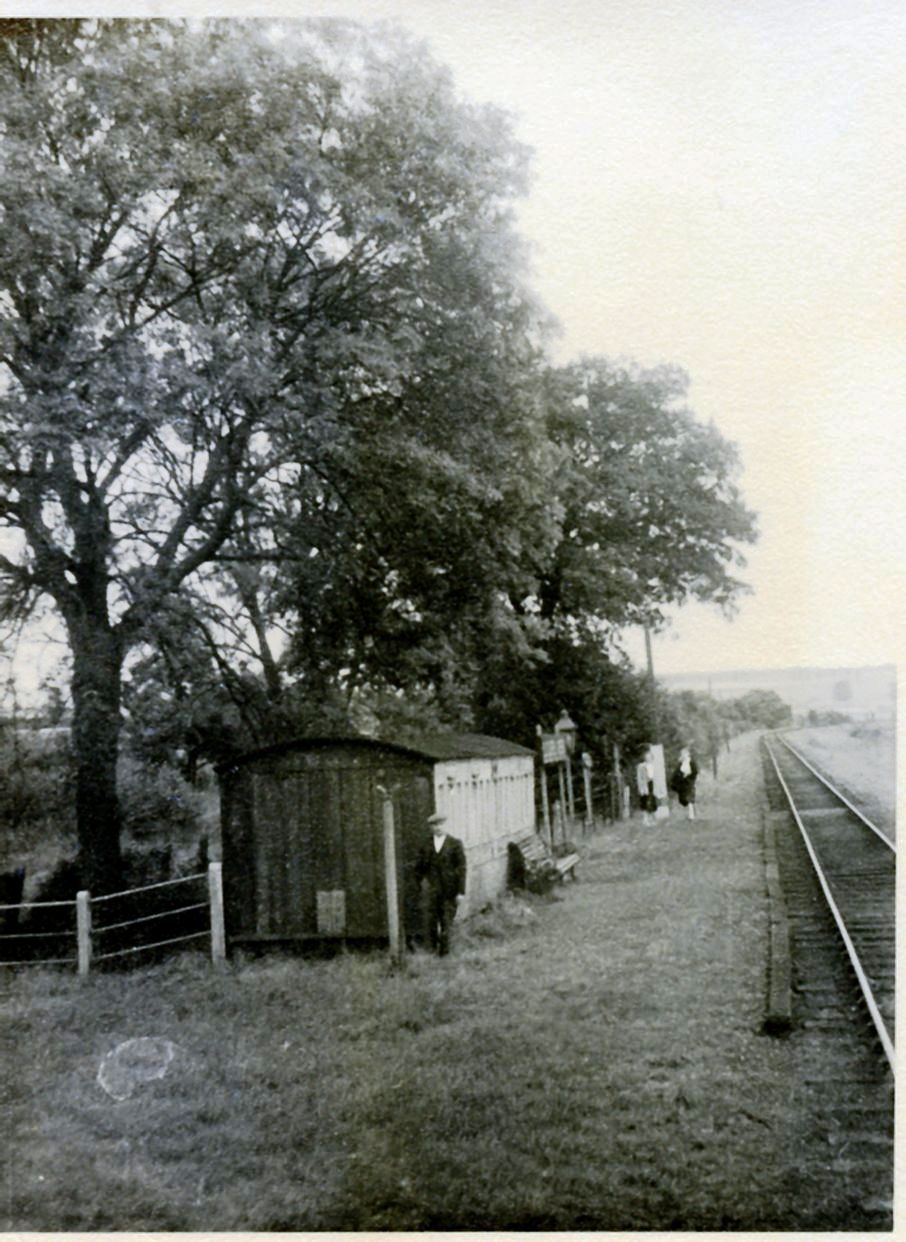
Cutters Green Halt station (1952)

Cutlers Green Halt railway station was a station serving the hamlet of Cutlers Green, Essex, opened on 1 April 1913 and accessed by a footpath from Loves Farm. It was located 4 miles 52 chains (7.48 km) from Elsenham station. It closed on 15 September 1952.

Preceding station	Disused railways	Following station
Sibleys	Elsenham and Thaxted Light Railway	Thaxted
