= Chickney =

Village and civil parish in Essex, England

Coordinates: 51.927627°N 0.28369290°E

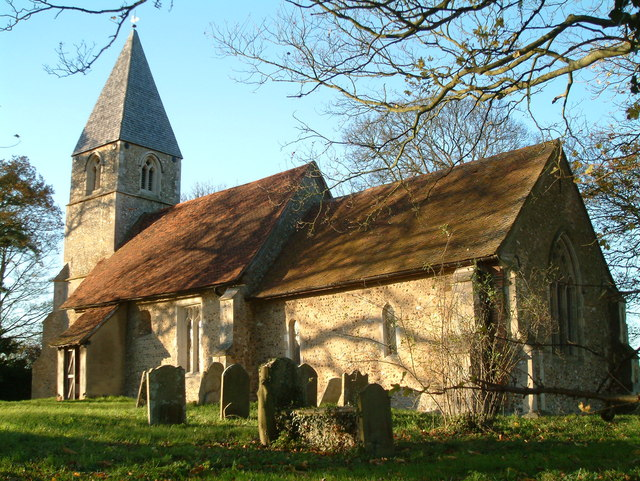
- St Mary's Church

- Location within Essex
- Area: 2.887 km^{2} (1.115 sq mi)
- Population: 44 (Parish, 2021)
  - Density: 15/km^{2} (39/sq mi)
- Civil parish: Chickney
- District: Uttlesford
- Shire county: Essex
- Region: East
- Country: England
- Sovereign state: United Kingdom
- Post town: Dunmow
- Postcode district: CM6
- Police: Essex
- Fire: Essex
- Ambulance: East of England

Chickney is a village and civil parish near Broxted and southwest of Thaxted, in Uttlesford, Essex, England. The parish borders Broxted, Debden, Henham and Thaxted. At the 2021 census the parish had a population of 44. Due to its small size, Chickney has a parish meeting which can be attended by all residents rather than an elected parish council.

== Landmarks ==
There are 10 listed buildings in the parish. Chickney has a church called St Mary's Church which is Grade I listed and is a redundant church in the care of the Churches Conservation Trust. Sibleys railway station in the parish closed in 1953.

== History ==
The name origin of Chickney is uncertain. It could mean 'Chicken Island' or possibly, 'Cicca's Island'. Chickney was recorded in the Domesday Book as Cicchenai.

== See also ==
- The Hundred Parishes
