= Elsenham railway station =

Railway station in Essex, England

Elsenham
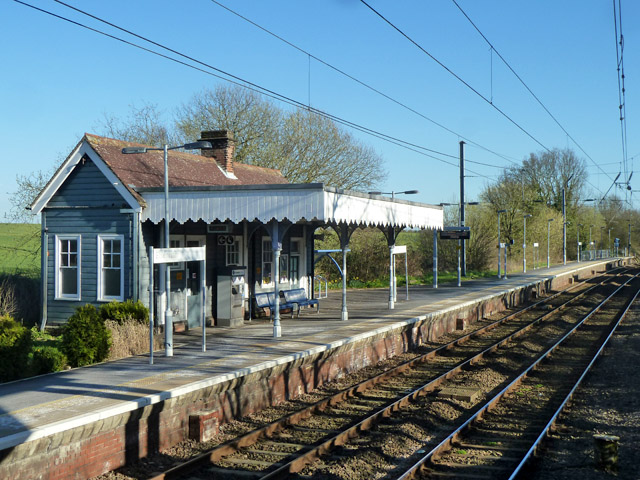
- The waiting room on the London-bound platform

General information
- Location: Elsenham, District of Uttlesford; England
- Coordinates: 51.921°N 0.228°E
- Grid reference: TL533270
- Manager: Greater Anglia
- Platforms: 2

Other information
- Station code: ESM
- Classification: DfT category E

History
- Opened: 1845

Passengers
- 2020/21: ▼63,386
- 2021/22: ▲0.156 million
- 2022/23: ▲0.192 million
- 2023/24: ▲0.208 million
- 2024/25: ▲0.223 million
Location
Notes
- Passenger statistics from the Office of Rail and Road

Elsenham railway station is found on the West Anglia Main Line, serving the village of Elsenham in Essex, England. It is 35 miles 45 chains (57.2 km) down the line from London Liverpool Street, and is situated between Stansted Mountfitchet and Newport stations. Its three-letter station code is ESM.

The station and all trains serving it are operated by Greater Anglia.

The ticket office (on the London-bound platform) is staffed part-time; there are self-service ticket machines on each of the platforms (which are staggered, the country-bound being north of a level crossing and the London-bound being south of it) and a permit to travel machine is also available. Electronic real-time departure boards are available on both platforms.

== Facilities ==
There is a café (in 2019) adjoining the Cambridge-bound platform: Jeff & Eddie's Railside Café.

There is a footbridge and a level crossing connecting the platforms.

== History ==
Elsenham station was opened in 1845 and retains its original layout with staggered platforms on either side of a level crossing.

From 1913 to 1952, it was the junction for the Elsenham and Thaxted Light Railway.

== Crossing accident ==
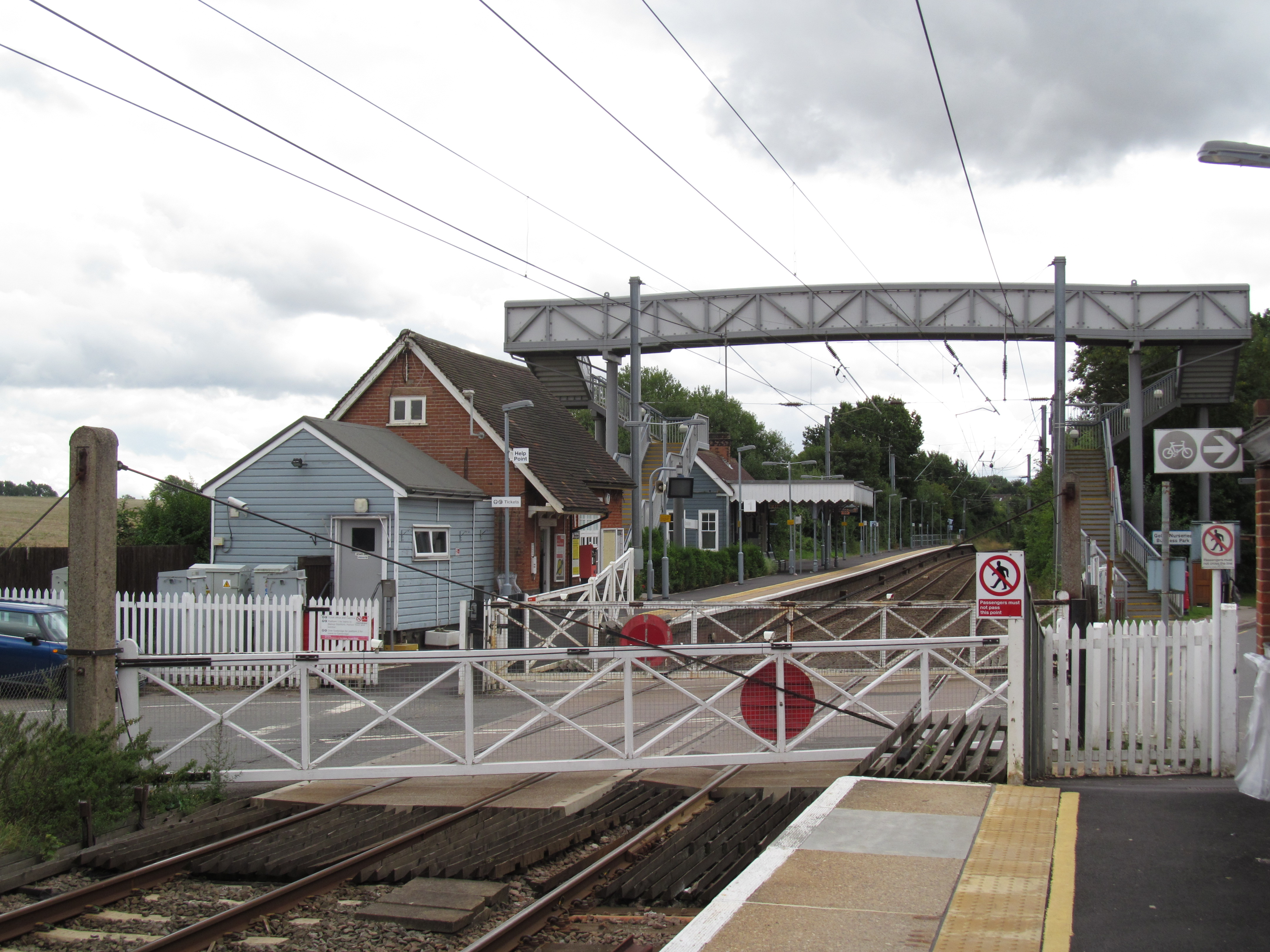
The pedestrian level crossing with the footbridge added in 2007

On 3 December 2005, Class 158 Express Sprinter unit 158856 struck and killed two teenage girls on the station pedestrian crossing, next to the manually operated level crossing between the staggered platforms. Although flashing red lights and a klaxon indicated that a train was approaching, it is likely that they thought these applied to the train they wanted to catch to Cambridge, which was just arriving at the opposite platform. The curvature of the line gives only three seconds visibility of an approaching non-stopping train. A fatality in the same circumstances had occurred in 1989.

Previous risk assessments carried out by Network Rail in 2002 had identified potential dangers with the crossing and recommended the installation of gates that would lock automatically as trains approached, but this was not acted upon. In 2012, Network Rail was prosecuted for breaching health and safety laws and fined £1 million for the accident.

Since the accident, Network Rail responded to requests from the girls' families and erected a footbridge and installed locking gates at the foot crossing in 2007. The accident led to a complete review by the Rail Accident Investigation Branch of all pedestrian level crossings at stations.

== Services ==
All services at Elsenham are operated by Greater Anglia using Class 720 EMUs.

The typical off-peak service in trains per hour is:

- 1 tph to London Liverpool Street
- 1 tph to Cambridge North

During the peak hours, the service is increased to 2 tph in each direction. The station is also served by a small number of peak hour services to and from Ely.

Preceding station	National Rail	Following station
Stansted Mountfitchet	Greater Anglia West Anglia Main Line	Newport
	Disused railways	
Terminus	Great Eastern Railway Elsenham and Thaxted Light Railway	Mill Road Halt Line and station closed
