= St Mary's Church, Chickney =

Coordinates: 51.9287°N 0.2882°E

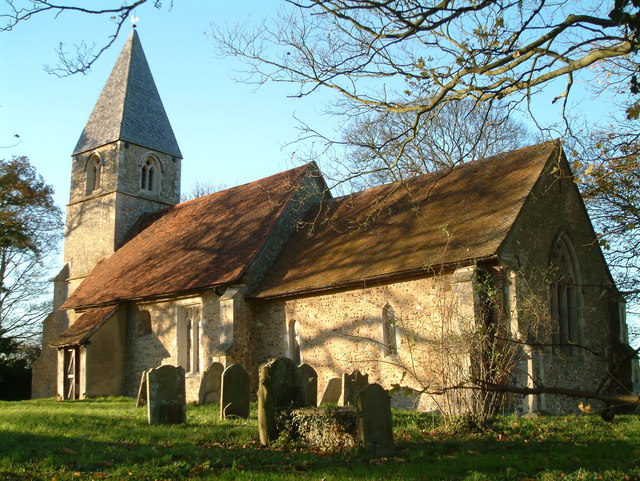
- St Mary's Church, Chickney, from the southeast

- Location in Essex
- OS grid reference: TL 575 280
- Location: Chickney, Essex
- Country: England
- Denomination: Anglican
- Website: Churches Conservation Trust

History
- Dedication: Saint Mary

Architecture
- Functional status: Redundant
- Heritage designation: Grade I
- Designated: 20 February 1967
- Architectural type: Church
- Style: Anglo-Saxon, Gothic
- Groundbreaking: 10th–11th century
- Completed: Early 15th century

Specifications
- Materials: Flint rubble with limestone and clunch dressings Tiled roofs, timber porch

St Mary's Church is a redundant Anglican church in the parish of Chickney, Essex, England. It is recorded in the National Heritage List for England as a designated Grade I listed building, and is under the care of the Churches Conservation Trust.

== History ==
St Mary's dates from a time before the Norman conquest, from either the late 10th or the early 11th century. The church is recorded in the Domesday Book. The chancel was extended during the reign of Henry III, and the tower was built in the 14th century. The south porch was added in the early 15th century.

== Architecture ==
=== Exterior ===
The church is constructed in flint rubble, with limestone and clunch dressings. The roofs have red tiles and the porch is timber. Its plan consists of a nave with a south porch, a chancel, and a west tower. The architectural style of the nave and chancel is Anglo-Saxon, and the rest of the church is Gothic. The tower is in three stages, with diagonal buttresses on the west side and a pyramidal roof. Also on the west side is a restored window. In the top stage there are two-light bell openings on each face. The nave contains a doorway from the 14th century, and windows pre-dating the Norman conquest. The windows in the chancel are lancets from the early 13th century, and a 15th-century squint is also present.

=== Interior ===
The king post roof dates from the early 14th century. The font is also from the 14th century, and it has a 16th-century cover. The piscina, with a trefoil head, is from the early 13th century. The pulpit is Georgian.

== See also ==
- List of churches preserved by the Churches Conservation Trust in the East of England
