= Newport railway station (Essex) =

Railway station in Essex, England

Coordinates: 51.980°N 0.215°E

Newport
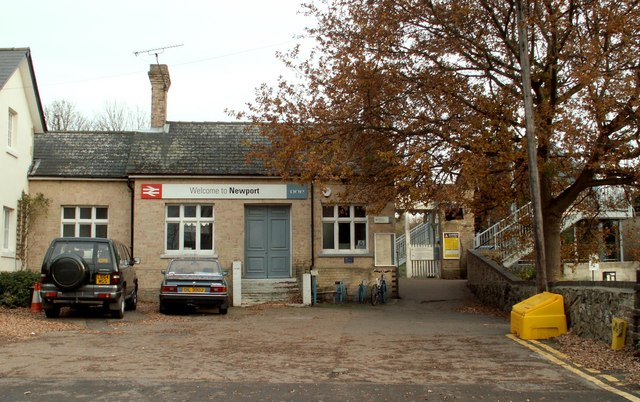

General information
- Location: Newport, Uttlesford; England
- Grid reference: TL522335
- Owner: Network Rail
- Manager: Greater Anglia
- Platforms: 2

Other information
- Station code: NWE
- Classification: DfT category E

Passengers
- 2020/21: ▼64,436
- 2021/22: ▲0.167 million
- 2022/23: ▲0.198 million
- 2023/24: ▲0.205 million
- 2024/25: ▲0.206 million
Location
Notes
- Passenger statistics from the Office of Rail and Road

Newport railway station is on the West Anglia Main Line serving the village of Newport in Essex, England. It is 39 miles 72 chains (64.2 km) down the line from London Liverpool Street and is situated between Elsenham and Audley End stations. Its three-letter station code is NWE.

The station and all trains serving it are operated by Greater Anglia. It is sometimes printed as Newport (Essex) on tickets and timetables in order to distinguish it from other similarly-named stations.

To the north of the station is the Audley End Viaduct. At 60 feet (18 m) high at its centre it is the tallest viaduct in Essex.

== History ==
The main station building was built in 1845 with the canopies added in 1884/1885. The station was built following the passing of a bill in Parliament in 1836 for a railway from London to Cambridge on a revised route passing through Newport. The Northern and Eastern Railway Company was incorporated in 1836 to build from London to Cambridge, but by 1843 they had only reached Bishop's Stortford and they were taken over by the Eastern Counties Railway Company. A contemporary newspaper, the Chelmsford Chronicle, recorded the applause and welcome the villagers gave to the first train passing through on 29 July 1845; "The music of the military band mingled at Stansted and Newport with the cheers of the mustered throngs, while the line of flags upon the carriages which danced as they rapidly cut the air, gave to the progress of the train not merely the character of gaiety, but an air of grandeur."

The station design is similar to others on the same line, particularly Great Chesterford and March, with only slight variants in construction and detailing. The waiting rooms still retain two distinctive painted Victorian Arts & Crafts cast iron fire surrounds designed by Thomas Jeckyll (1827–1881) and produced by Barnard, Bishop and Barnard in Norwich for the Great Eastern Railway. Thomas Jeckyll was a trained architect and started working at the foundry in 1859 and is best known for his metal work design in particular fireplace and fireplace grates.

In March 1970 the old shed over a siding at Newport station was demolished. The demolition went underway without consultation with the local community. A week later it had completely disappeared.

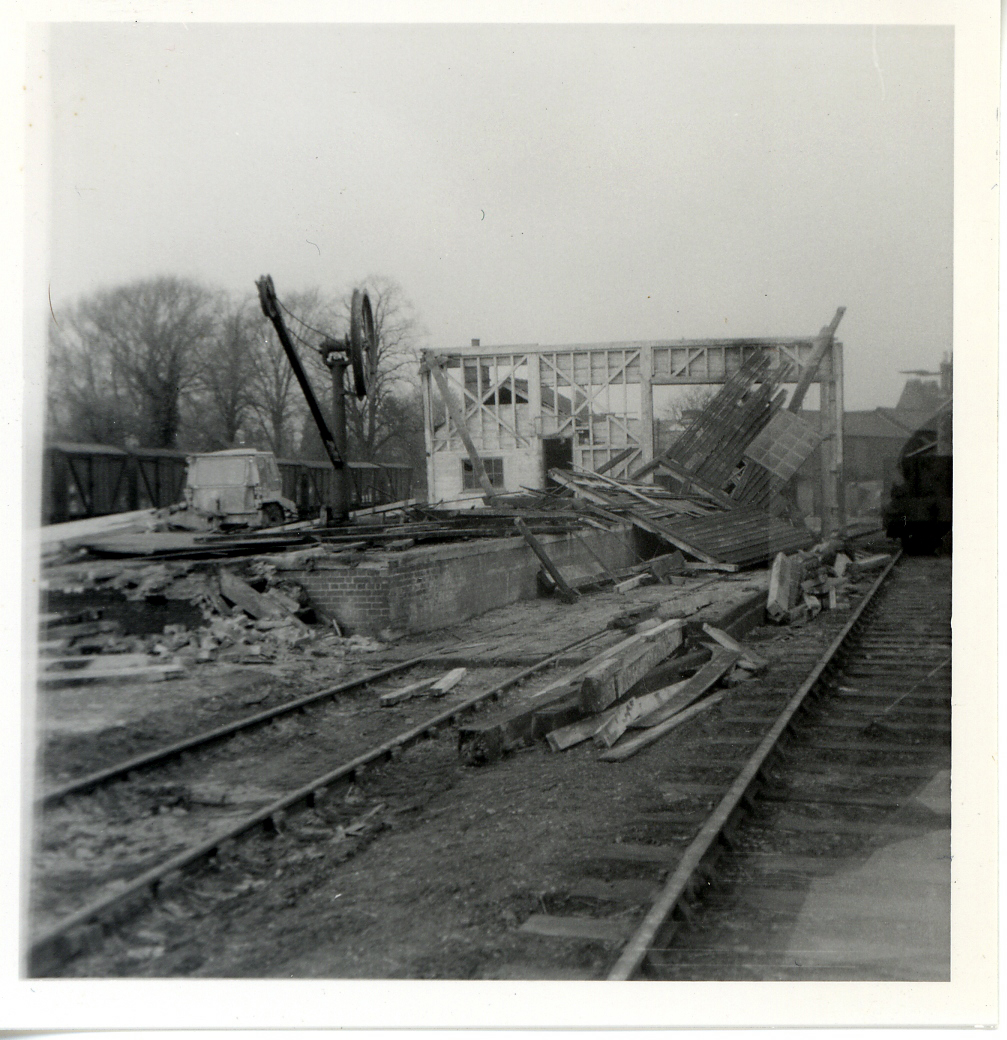
Siding demolition March 1970

== Adoption ==
In November 2010 the station was "adopted" on behalf of the community by the Newport Business Association (NBA). At the heart of Newport the railway station serves over 200,000 passengers every year. With commuters bound for London and Cambridge and children attending Joyce Frankland Academy it is people's first sight of Newport - their introduction to the village. The station is 165 years old

In conjunction with National Express East Anglia, Network Rail, British Transport Police and local businesses, the NBA undertaking renovations, citing an effort to making the station welcoming, attractive and secure for businesses, residents and visitors alike. The station is having the front entrance renovated, bridge refurbished, station buildings repainted and decorated and replanted. Landscaped wild flower areas will serve as pollinator habitats.

In 2011 2,500 plants were planted, and a further 300 lavender plants and five cherry trees were planted near the station in 2012.

Victorian fire surround

== Facilities ==
The booking office is staffed during the weekday mornings peak (06:30-09:30), and waiting rooms on both platforms are open when staff are present. There is also an automatic ticket machine and modern information screens and help points on both platforms.

== Service ==
All services at Newport are operated by Greater Anglia using Class 720 EMUs.

The typical off-peak service in trains per hour is:

- 1 train per hour to London Liverpool Street
- 1 train per hour to Cambridge North

During the peak hours, the service is increased to 2 tph in each direction. The station is also served by a small number of peak hour services to and from Ely.

Preceding station	National Rail	Following station
Elsenham	Greater Anglia West Anglia Main Line	Audley End
