= Timothy Smith (cricketer, born 1953) =

English cricketer

Personal information
- Full name: Timothy Stewart Smith
- Born: 29 December 1953 (age 72); Henham, Essex, England
- Batting: Right-handed
- Bowling: Slow left-arm orthodox

Domestic team information
- Years: Team
- 1994–2011: Cambridgeshire
- 1984–1985: Minor Counties
- 1979–1990: Hertfordshire

Career statistics
Competition	First-class	List A
Matches	1	23
Runs scored	9	152
Batting average	9.00	10.13
100s/50s	–/–	–/–
Top score	9	36
Balls bowled	366	1,152
Wickets	7	11
Bowling average	19.57	65.63
5 wickets in innings	1	–
10 wickets in match	–	–
Best bowling	5/79	3/35
Catches/stumpings	1/–	9/–
- Source: Cricinfo, 27 November 2010

Timothy Stewart Smith (born 29 December 1953) is an English cricketer. Smith is a right-handed batsman who bowls slow left-arm orthodox. He was born at Henham, Essex and later educated at Bishop's Stortford College in Hertfordshire.

== Hertfordshire ==
Smith made his Minor Counties Championship debut for Hertfordshire in 1979 against Norfolk. He represented the county in Minor Counties Championship matches from 1979 to 1990, playing his final Championship match for the county against Staffordshire. He made his MCCA Knockout Trophy debut in the competitions inaugural season against Cheshire. He played in the Trophy for Hertfordshire from 1983 to 1990, with his final match for them coming against Bedfordshire.

It was while playing for Hertfordshire that he made his debut in List A cricket. This came against Hampshire in the 1983 NatWest Trophy. From 1983 to 1990, he represented the county in 8 List A matches, the last of which came against Warwickshire in the 1990 NatWest Trophy.

=== Minor Counties cricket team ===
During his time with Hertfordshire he represented the combined Minor Counties cricket team. He first represented them in List A cricket, playing 4 Benson and Hedges Cup matches against first-class opposition in 1984. The following season he played his only first-class match for the team against the touring Zimbabweans. In this match he scored 9 runs and took a single catch in the field. With the ball he took 7 wickets at a bowling average of 19.57, with a single five wicket haul which gave him best figures of 5/79.

== Cambridgeshire ==
In 1992, he joined Cambridgeshire, making his Minor Counties Championship debut against Norfolk. Smith has represented the county in Minor Counties Championship matches from 1992 to present. His MCCA Knockout Trophy debut for the county came in 1993 against Suffolk. Smith has played Trophy matches for the county from 1993 to present. His continued presence in the Cambridgeshire team made him as of his final season in 2011 the oldest player on the county cricket circuit.

Smith also played List A cricket for Cambridgeshire when they were permitted to take part in the domestic one-day tournament featuring the first-class counties. His debut in that format for the county came against Hampshire in the 1994 NatWest Trophy. From 1994 to 2004, he represented the county in 11 List A matches, the last of which came against Northamptonshire in the 2004 Cheltenham & Gloucester Trophy.

Smith played a total of 23 List A matches during his career. In these he scored 152 runs at a batting average of 10.13, with a high score of 36. In the field he took 9 catches, while with the ball he took 11 wickets at a bowling average of 65.63, with best figures of 3/35.
