= Ambrose Thomas (artist) =

English artist and designer

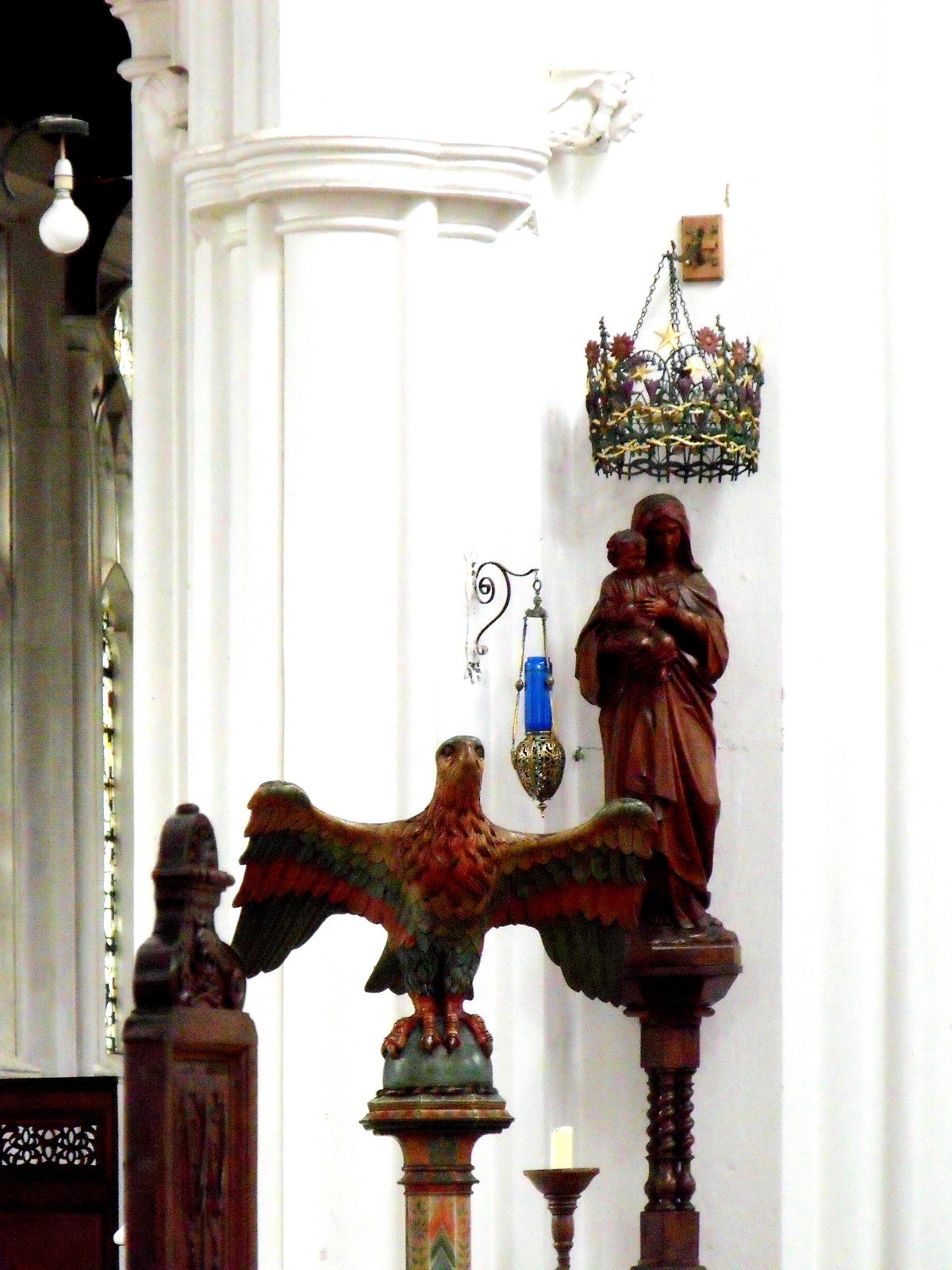
Painted eagle lectern at Thaxted Parish Church

Ambrose Thomas (21 June 1880 – 11 December 1959), alias Amand Edouard Ambroise Marie Lowis Etienne Phillipe d'Sant Andre Tournay, Marquis d'Oisy was an English artist. After a period as an Anglican Benedictine monk under Aelred Carlyle on Caldey Island, Thomas worked as a designer for the vestment-design firm of Louis Grossé. He moved in 1917 to Pledgdon Green, where he died after a career in which he received several commissions by Conrad Noel for work in Thaxted Parish Church.
