= Thaxted railway station =

Former railway station in England

Thaxted
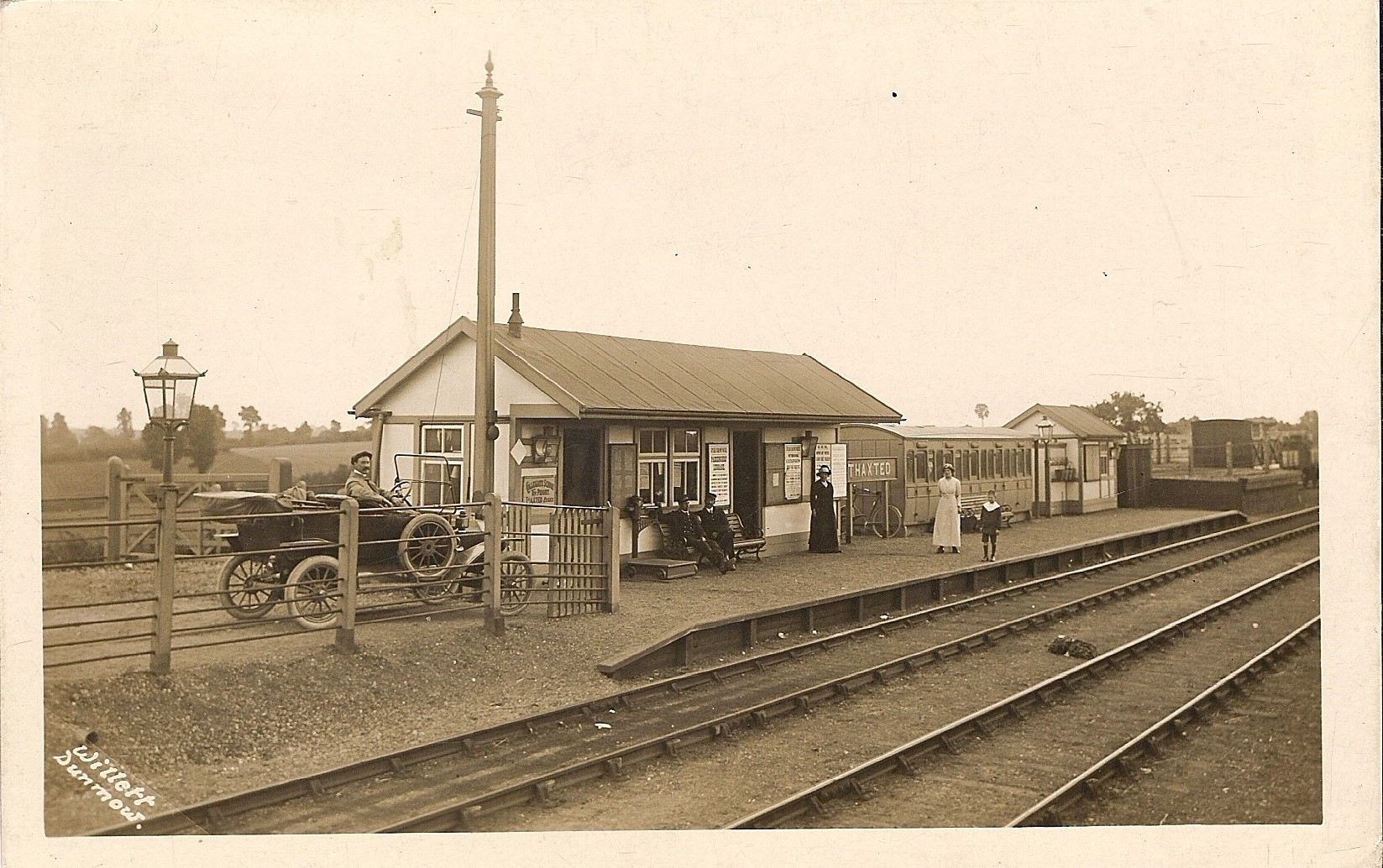

General information
- Location: Thaxted, Uttlesford; England
- Coordinates: 51.9456°N 0.3332°E
- Grid reference: TL604300
- Platforms: 1

Other information
- Status: Disused

History
- Original company: Elsenham and Thaxted Light Railway
- Pre-grouping: Elsenham and Thaxted Light Railway
- Post-grouping: London and North Eastern Railway

Key dates
- 1 April 1913: Opened
- 15 September 1952: Closed
Location

Thaxted railway station served the village of Thaxted, Essex. It was located 5 miles 47 chains (8.99 km) from Elsenham station. It closed in 1952.

== In popular culture ==
The station was used as a location in the 1952 British film Time Gentlemen, Please! where it stands in for the fictional 'Little HayHoe' railway station.

Preceding station	Disused railways	Following station
Cutlers Green Halt	Elsenham and Thaxted Light Railway	Terminus
