= Pledgdon Green =

Hamlet in Essex, England

Coordinates: 51.917°N 0.272°E

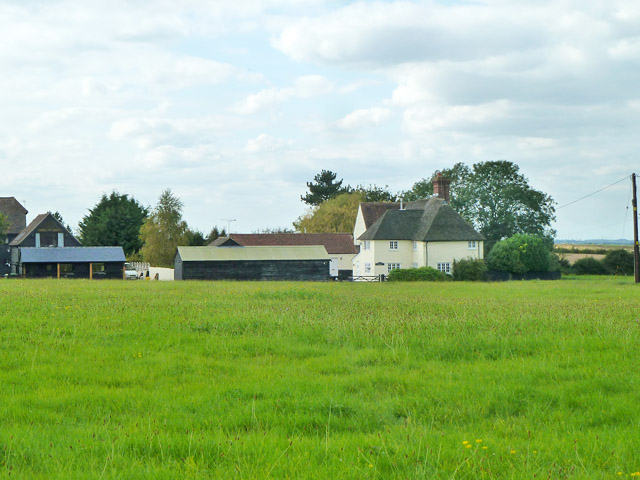

- Location within Essex
- OS grid reference: TL563268
  - London: 35 mi (56 km) SSE
- Civil parish: Henham
- District: Uttlesford
- Shire county: Essex
- Region: East
- Country: England
- Sovereign state: United Kingdom
- Post town: BISHOP'S STORTFORD
- Postcode district: CM22
- Police: Essex
- Fire: Essex
- Ambulance: East of England
- UK Parliament: Saffron Walden

Pledgdon Green, also known as Pledgdon or Prison Green, is a hamlet in the civil parish of Henham, in the Uttlesford district of Essex, England. The hamlet is situated just over 1 mile (1.6 km) south-east from the parish village of Henham. Nearby settlements include the villages of Broxted and Elsenham.
