= Henham =

Village in Essex, England

Coordinates: 51.9334°N 0.251962°E

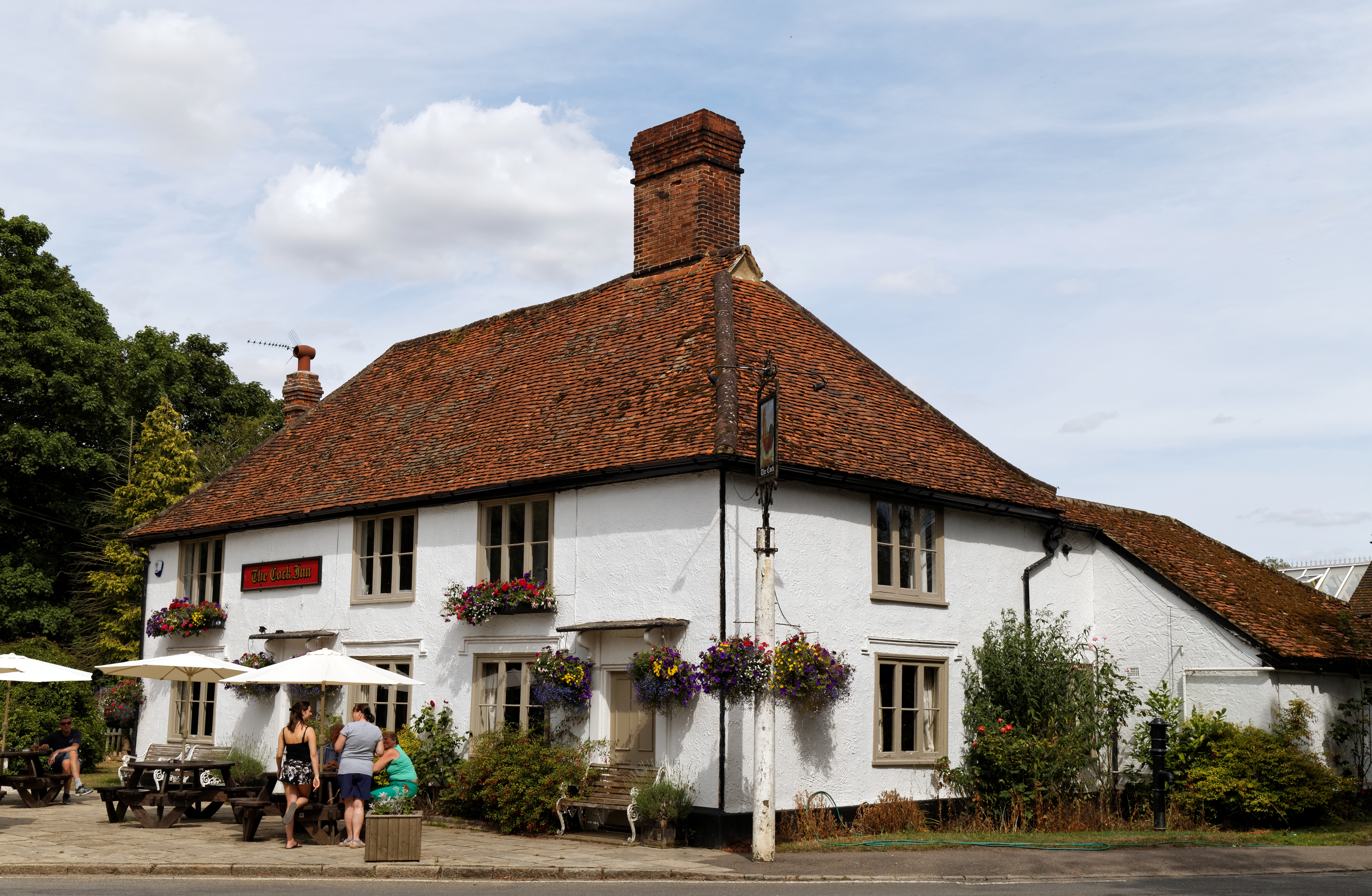
- The Cock Inn

- Location within Essex
- Population: 1,325 (Parish, 2021)
- OS grid reference: TL549285
  - London: 35 mi (56 km) SSE
- Civil parish: Henham
- District: Uttlesford
- Shire county: Essex
- Region: East
- Country: England
- Sovereign state: United Kingdom
- Post town: BISHOP'S STORTFORD
- Postcode district: CM22
- Dialling code: 01279
- Police: Essex
- Fire: Essex
- Ambulance: East of England
- UK Parliament: Saffron Walden

Henham, or Henham-on-the-Hill is a village and civil parish in the Uttlesford district of Essex, England. The village is situated 2.5 miles (4 km) north from London Stansted Airport. The parish includes the hamlets of Little Henham and Pledgdon Green. At the 2021 census the parish had a population of 1,325.

Henham's parish church is dedicated to St Mary the Virgin. The community Village Shop & Post Office situated opposite the Village ponds is run totally by volunteers. The local public house is The Cock Inn.

A dragon legend at Henham began with the 1669 pamphlet The Flying Serpent or Strange News Out of Essex, which promoted further alleged sightings of the dragon. Today, many signs in the village contain dragon motifs.

Henham was a station on the Elsenham to Thaxted branch line.

The village holds a bi-annual 10 kilometre run in the final weeks of May. There is a Tennis Club, Village Hall and OSCA (Hall & rooms for local activities). A monthly magazine "The Dragon" is distributed free to all residents.

There is a bi-annual pantomime which takes place in the village hall in early January. Restarted in 2014 after a 10 year break, appearances so far have included "Cinderella", "Snow white and the Seven Princes", "Jack and the Beanstalk", and "Alice in Pantoland"

Current notable residents include comedian Ed Byrne, former pro South African cyclist Tiaan Visser and actor John Savident. Hertfordshire, Minor Counties and Cambridgeshire cricketer Timothy Smith was born in the village.

== Gallery ==
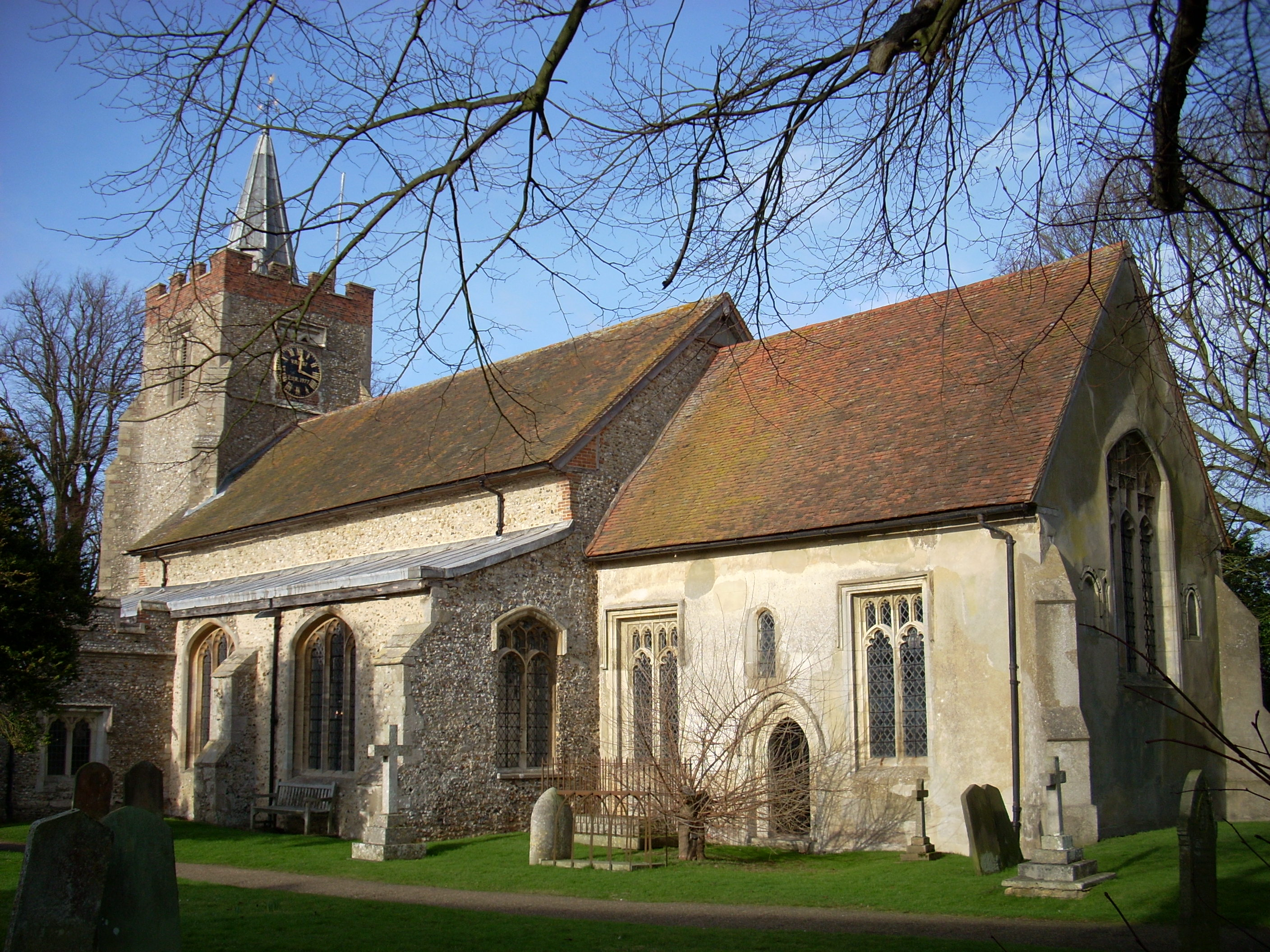
Church of St Mary the Virgin

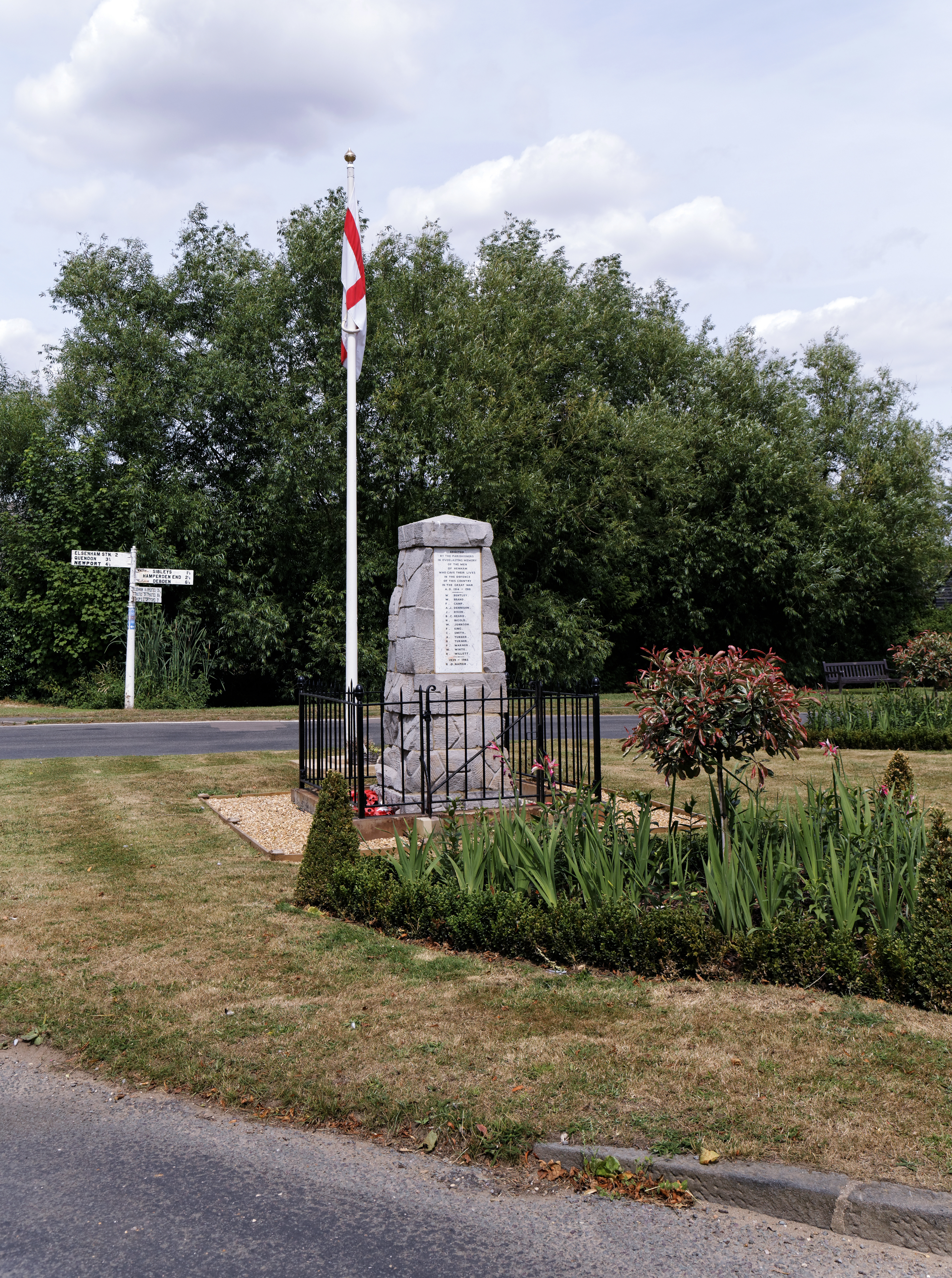
Henham war memorial

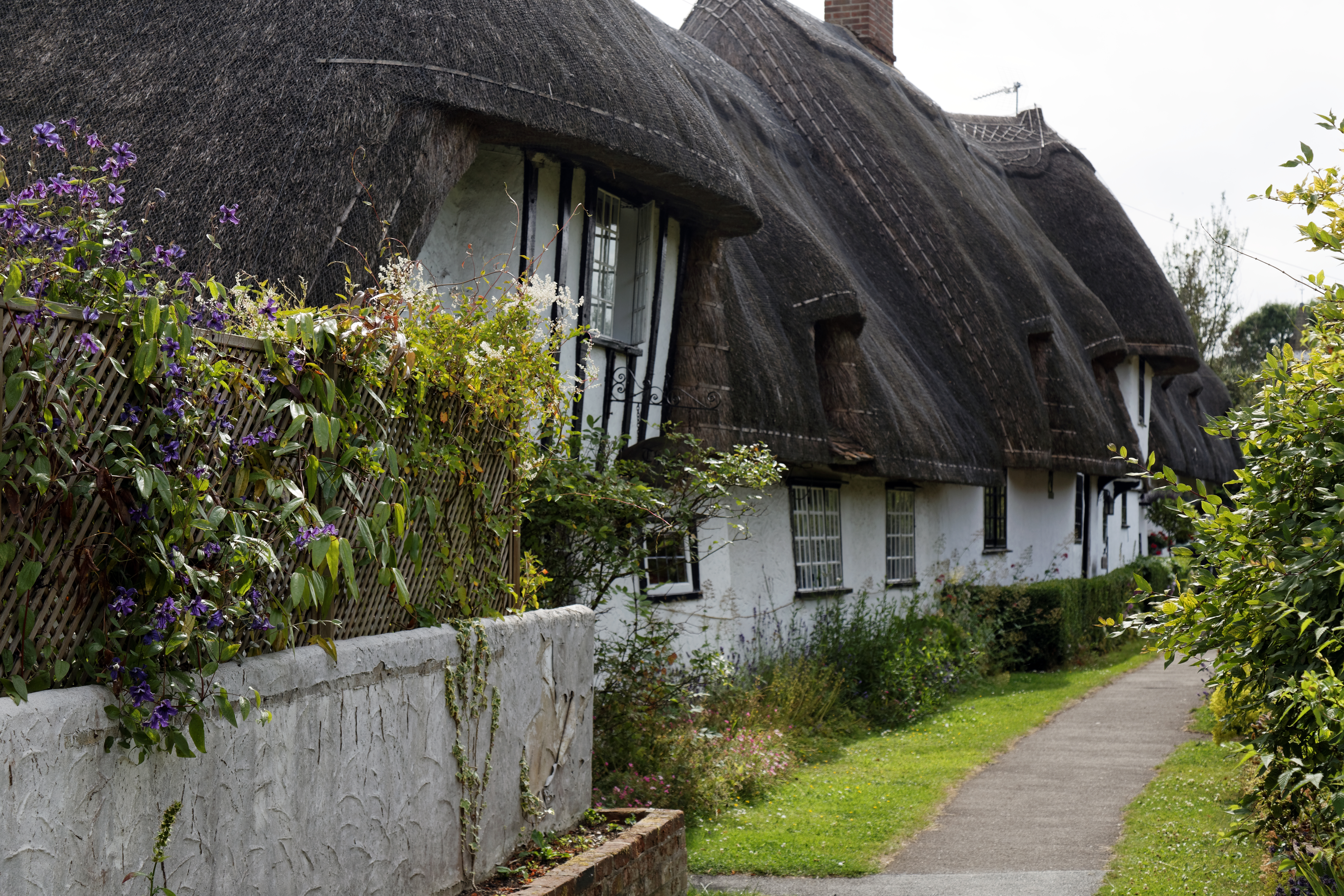
Cottages off Crow Street

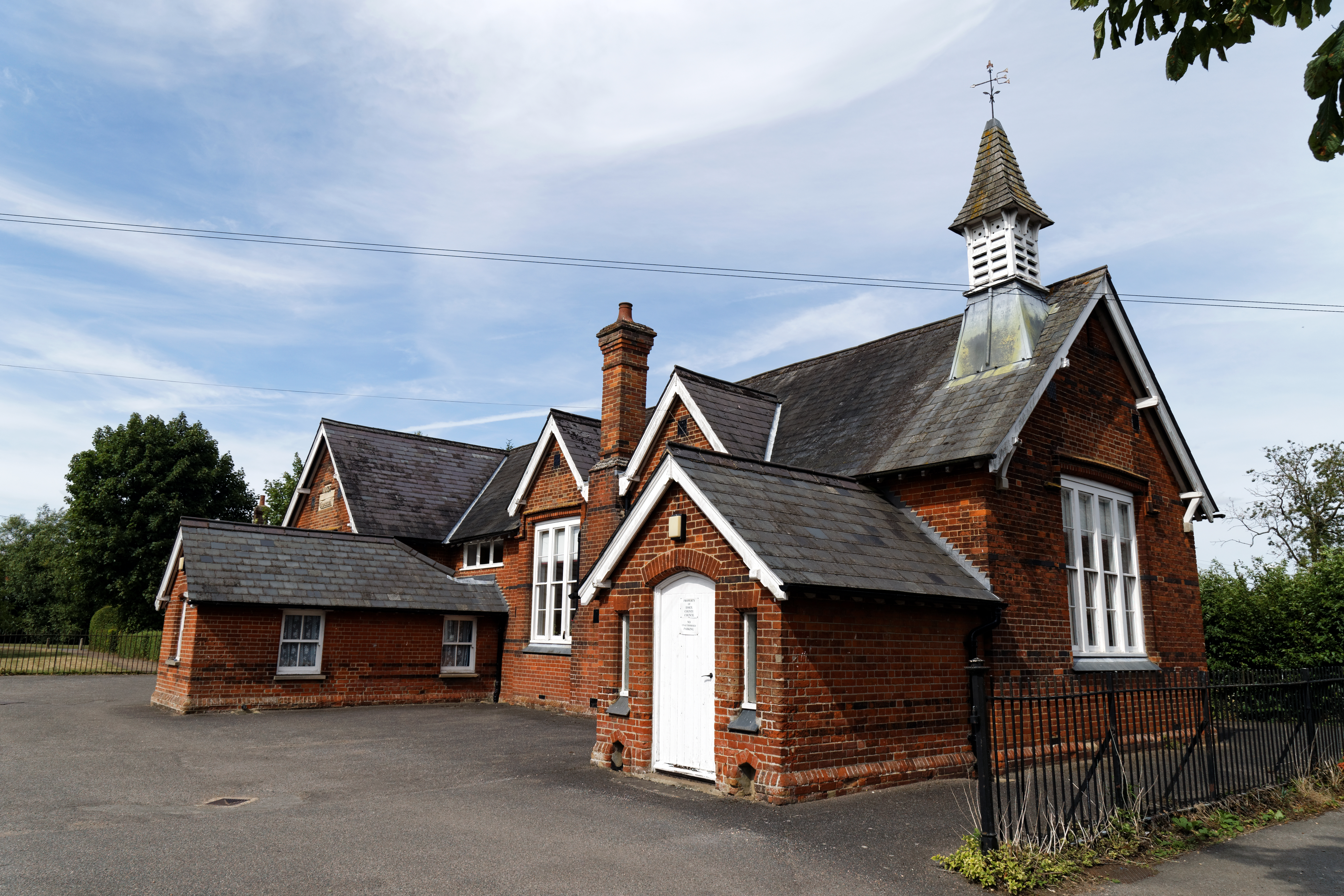
Old Henham school, now OSCA village hall

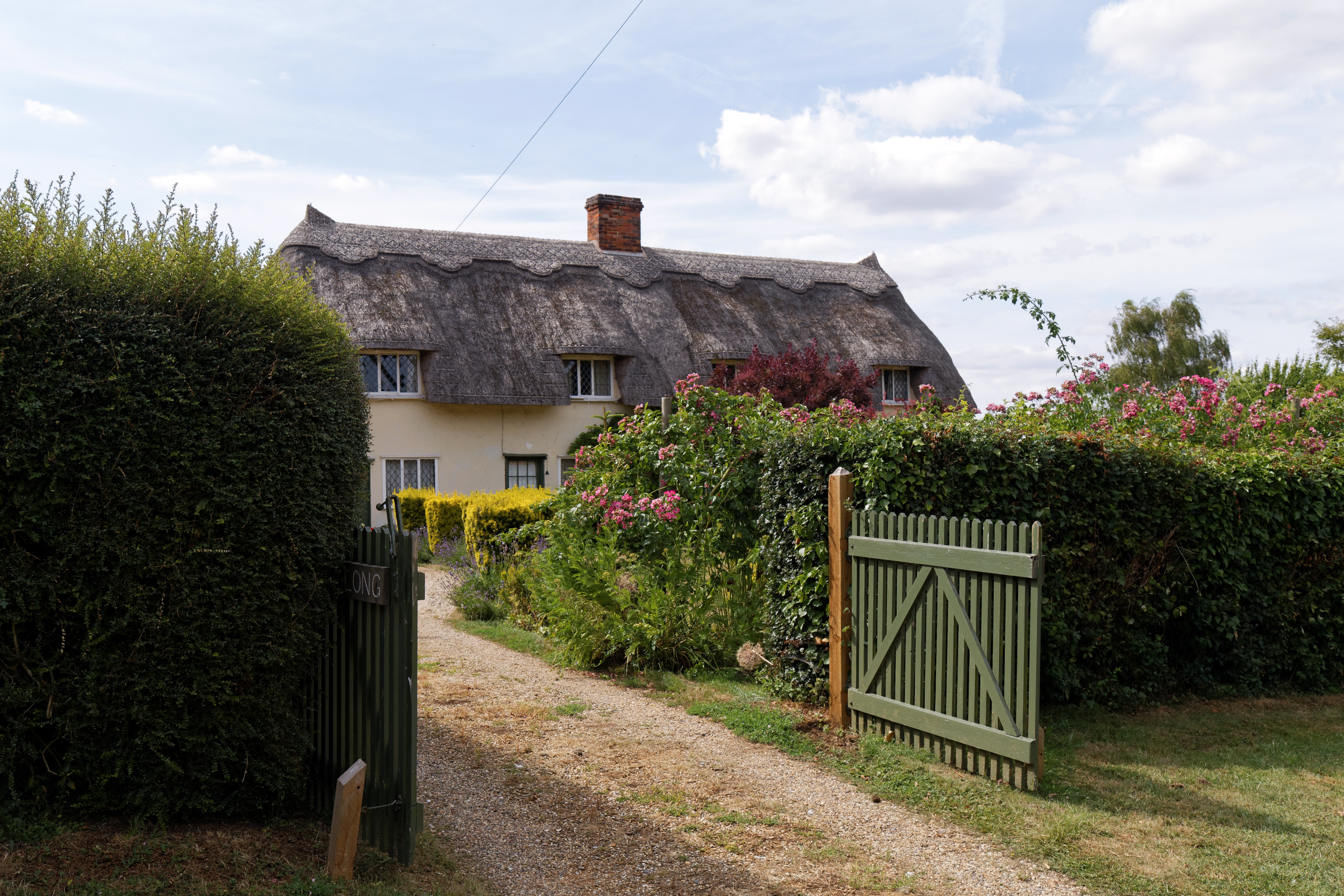
Cottage on Church Street

== See also ==
The Hundred Parishes
