= Elsenham =

Village in Essex, England

Coordinates: 51.9204°N 0.226°E

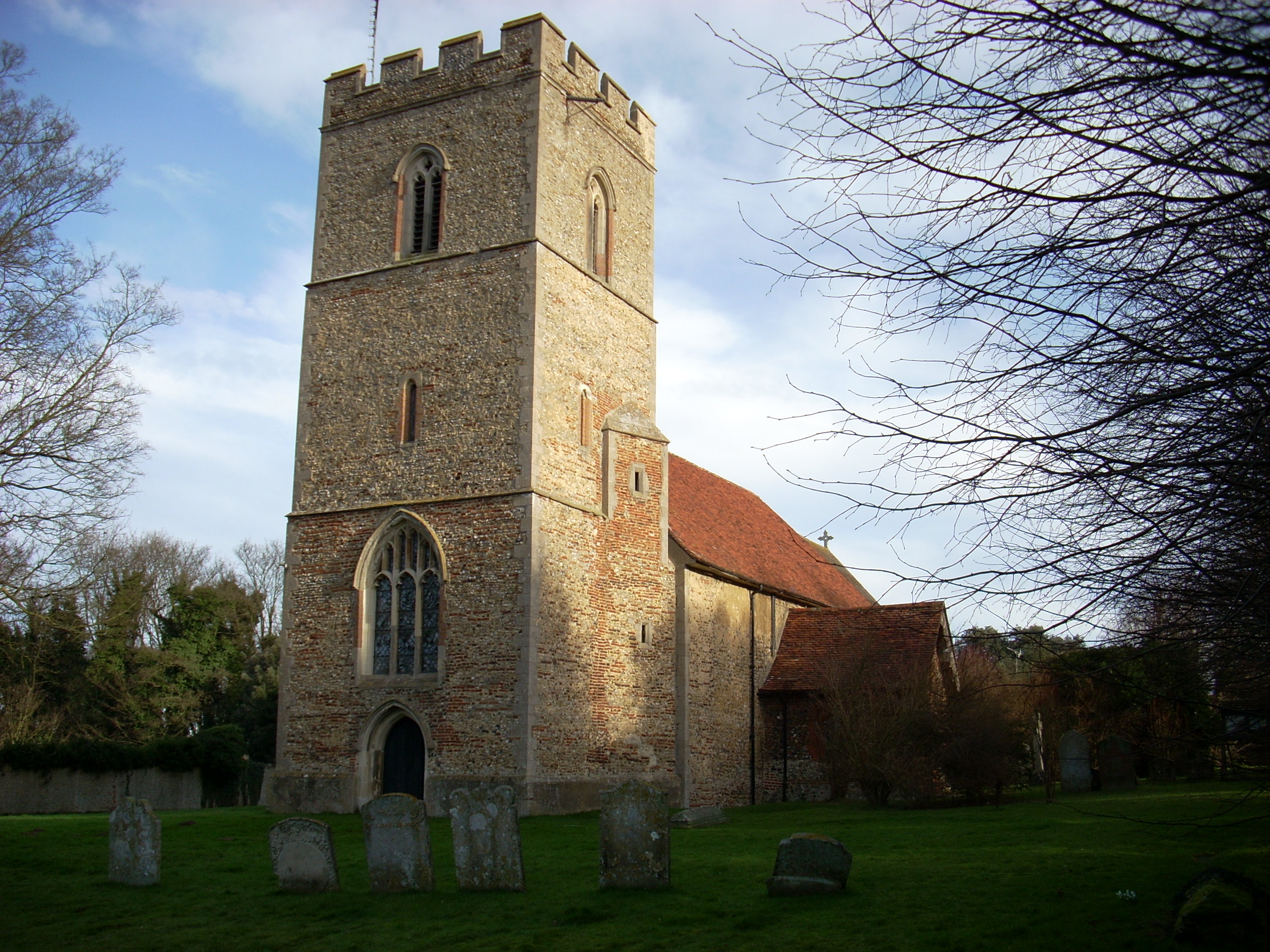
- Church of St Mary the Virgin

- Location within Essex
- Population: 3,571 (Parish, 2021); 3,501 (Built up area, 2021)
- OS grid reference: TL531269
- Civil parish: Elsenham
- District: Uttlesford
- Shire county: Essex
- Region: East
- Country: England
- Sovereign state: United Kingdom
- Post town: Bishop's Stortford
- Postcode district: CM22
- Police: Essex
- Fire: Essex
- Ambulance: East of England
- UK Parliament: North West Essex

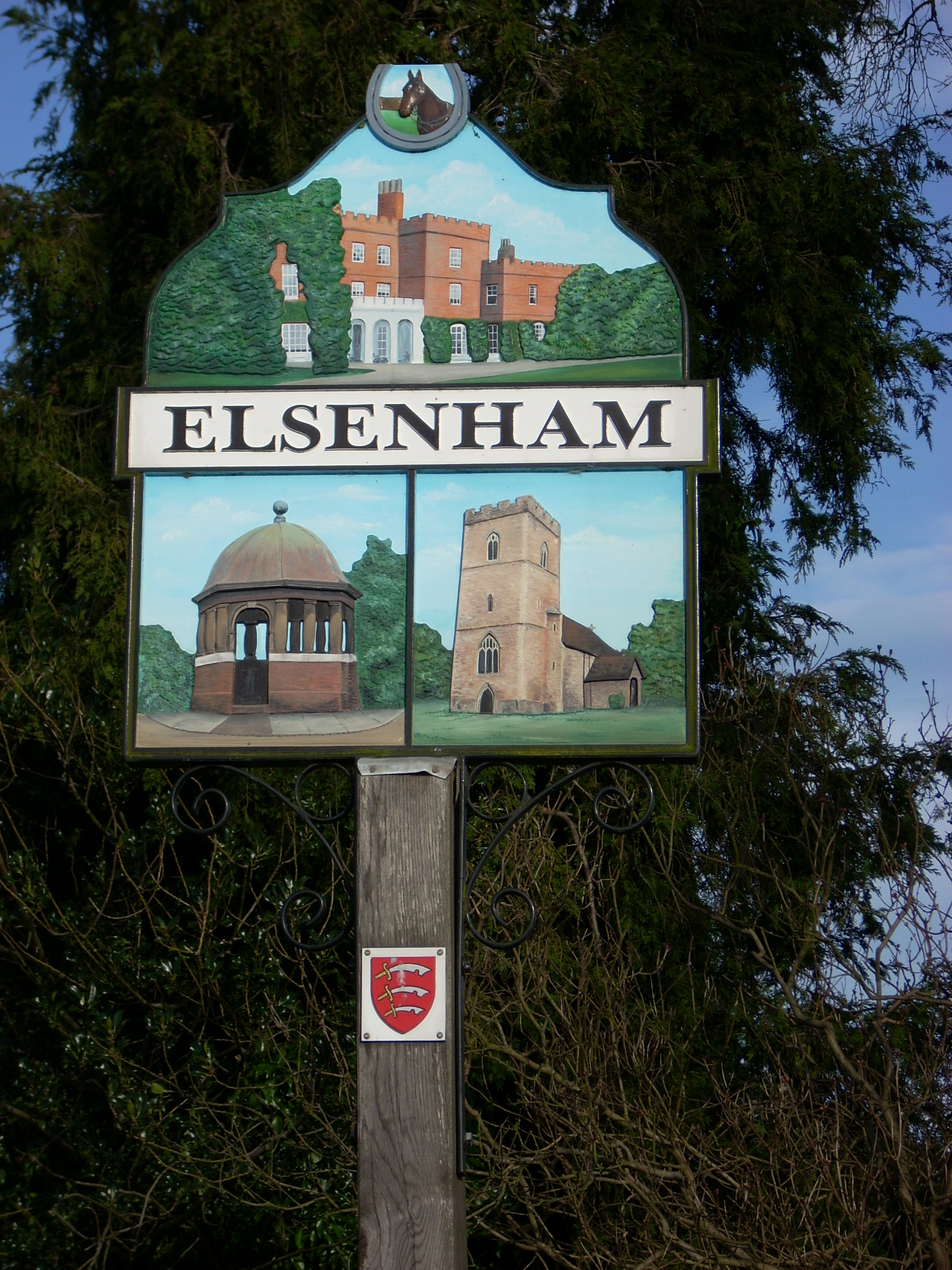
The village sign: the top section depicts Elsenham Hall; the bottom sections show St Mary's Church and the pump

Elsenham is a village and civil parish in north-west Essex in eastern England. It lies 4 miles (6 km) north-east of Bishop's Stortford, its post town, which is over the county boundary in Hertfordshire. It is 1.5 miles (2.4 km) east of the large village of Stansted Mountfitchet and lies to the north of London Stansted Airport. At the 2021 census the parish had a population of 3,571 and the Elsenham built up area had a population of 3,501.

== History ==
Elsenham is recorded in the Domesday Book of 1086 as Alsenham and Elsenham in the Hundred of Uttlesford. Part belonged to Robert Gernon and part to John, nephew of Waleran. The village is best known for Elsenham Jam, which was produced on the Elsenham estate of Sir Walter Gilbey, and marketed with the slogan, "the most expensive jam in the world". Elsenham Jam is no longer produced in Elsenham, the company having moved to Wales.

In April 2008, Elsenham was short-listed by the Government as a potential site for a 5,000 homes 'eco-town' development.

== Notable features ==
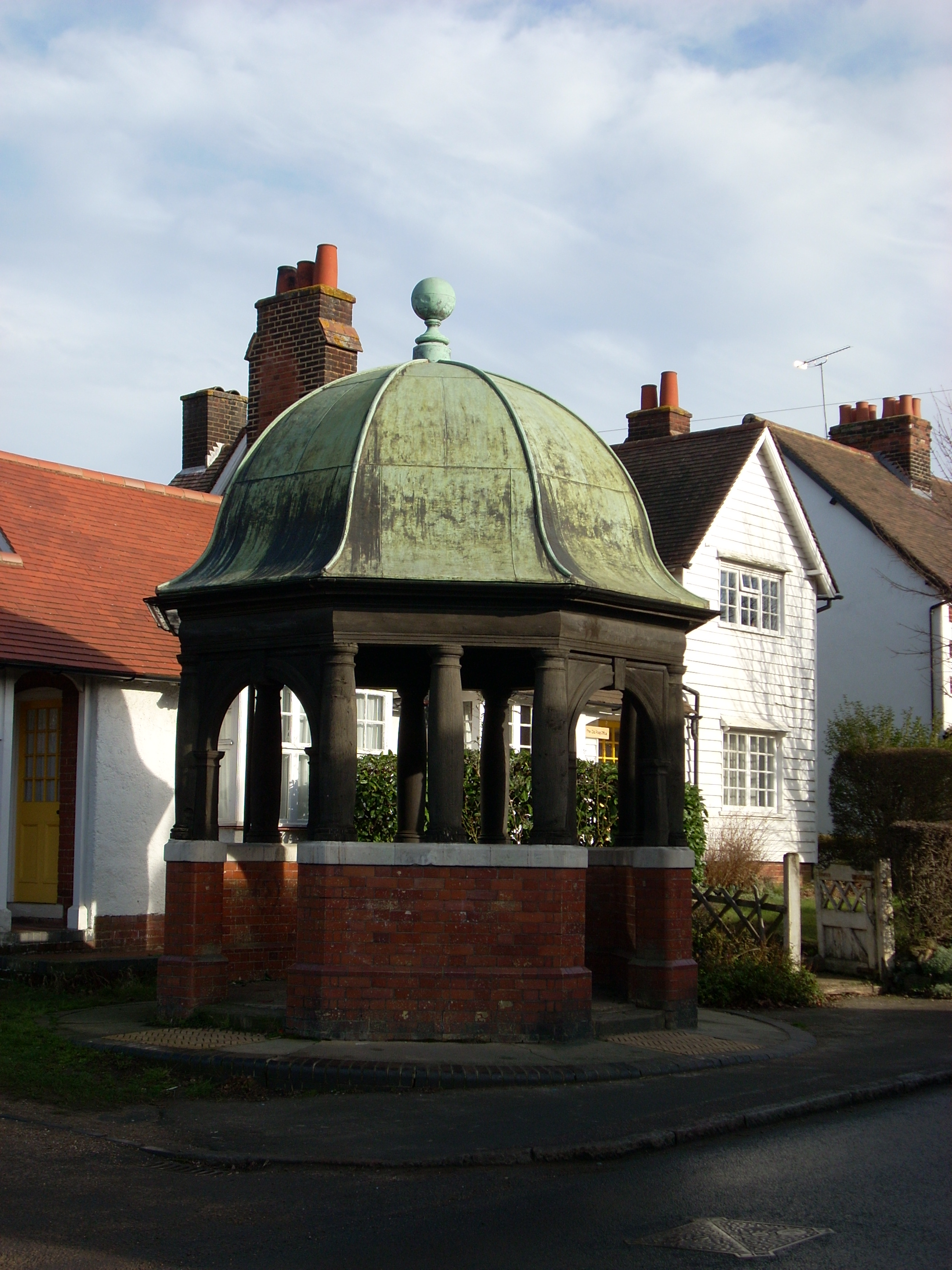
The pump

Notable features include Elsenham Hall, the home of Sir Walter Gilbey, St Mary's Church, formerly known as the Little Norman Church on the Hill, and the village pump which stands in the village centre and was built by Sir Walter Gilbey in memory of his wife. A horse, Golden Miller, who won the Cheltenham Gold Cup five times between 1932 and 1936 and the Grand National in 1934, is buried at Elsenham Stud.

== Governance ==
Elsenham is part of the electoral ward called Elsenham and Henham. The population of this ward at the 2011 Census was 3,679.

== Society and leisure ==
A variety of village events are held each year: a village fete; the Flower Show Society's Annual Show; an Arts & Craft Fair and a firework display in the autumn; and Santa and Gift Galore in December. Elsenham also has a number of small clubs as well as tennis courts, a bowling green, a cricket field, a youth football club and two pool teams. The village has a number of small businesses, a pub and a primary school.

== Transport ==
The village is served by a railway station (Elsenham) on the line between Cambridge and London Liverpool Street. Trains usually run every half an hour or every hour, served by Greater Anglia.

The village is about four miles from junction 8 of the M11 motorway and also approximately three miles from Stansted Airport. A highly publicised expansion of the airport could include new road and rail links passing within the village boundaries.

== See also ==
- The Hundred Parishes
