= Elsenham and Thaxted Light Railway =

Disused railway line in England

Coordinates: 51.9474°N 0.2792°E

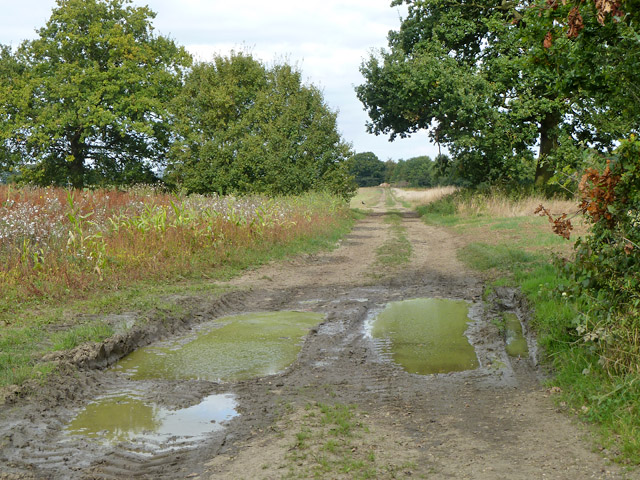
Course of Thaxted branch line in 2014.

The Elsenham and Thaxted Light Railway was a 5 1/2-mile (9 km) long light railway in Essex, England. The line was sanctioned by the Elsenham and Thaxted Light Railway Order 1911, although did not finally open to traffic until 1 April 1913. It was the last rail line built in Essex until the construction of Stansted Airport railway station.

The railway left the West Anglia Main Line at Elsenham. There were two stations (Sibleys and Thaxted) and three halts on the Railway; all except Mill Road Halt (opened in 1922) were opened with the line. The line was never a commercial success, since all the stations were located at some distance from the settlements they served; Thaxted station was 3/4 mile (1.2 km) distant from the town, since to construct a crossing of the River Chelmer would have been too costly. The Engineer's Line Reference for the line is ELT.

As a light railway it was limited to 25 mph (40 km/h) giving a journey time of 22–28 minutes. There were five down and four up trains per day on opening.

Passenger services were withdrawn from 15 September 1952 and the railway finally closed on 1 June 1953.
