= 1976 Braintree District Council election =

English election

← 1973	6 May 1976	1979 →

All 58 seats to Braintree District Council 30 seats needed for a majority
- Turnout: 49.3% (▲1.5%)

	First party	Second party	Third party
Party	Conservative	Labour	Independent
Last election	15 seats, 30.2%	22 seats, 39.2%	15 seats, 17.6%
Seats won	39	8	8
Seat change	▲24	▼14	▼7
Popular vote	33,998	24,071	6,409
Percentage	48.0%	34.0%	9.0%
Swing	▲17.8%	▼5.2%	▼8.6%
	Fourth party	Fifth party	Sixth party
Party	Liberal	Residents	Ind. Conservative
Last election	3 seats, 9.8%	1 seat, 1.8%	2 seats, 0.9%
Seats won	1	1	1
Seat change	▼2	Steady	▼1
Popular vote	4,365	1,727	0
Percentage	6.2%	2.4%	0.0%
Swing	▼3.6%	▲0.6%	▼0.9%
Council control before election
No overall control
Council control after election
Conservative

The 1976 Braintree District Council election took place on 6 May 1976 to elect members of Braintree District Council in England. This was on the same day as other local elections.

== Summary ==
=== Election result ===
1976 Braintree District Council election
Party	Seats	Gains	Losses	Net gain/loss	Seats %	Votes %	Votes	+/−
Conservative	39			▲24	67.2	48.0	33,998	+17.8
Labour	8			▼14	13.8	34.0	24,071	–5.2
Independent	8			▼7	13.8	9.0	6,409	–8.6
Liberal	1			▼2	1.7	6.2	4,365	–3.6
Residents	1			Steady	1.7	2.4	1,727	+0.6
Ind. Conservative	1			▼1	1.7	0.0	0	–0.9
Independent Liberal	0			Steady	0.0	0.2	148	N/A
Communist	0			Steady	0.0	0.2	144	–0.4

== Ward results ==
=== Black Notley ===
Black Notley
Party	Candidate	Votes	%	±%
Conservative	E. Mills*	369	74.2	+17.2
Labour	J. Hall	128	25.8	–4.3
Majority		241	48.5	+21.6
Turnout		497	43.0	+3.3
Registered electors		1,185		
Conservative hold		Swing	▲10.8	

No Independent candidate as previous (12.9%).

=== Bumpstead ===
Bumpstead
Party	Candidate	Votes	%	±%
Conservative	S. Drapkin	Unopposed		
Registered electors		1,210		
Conservative hold				

=== Castle Headingham ===
Castle Headingham
Party	Candidate	Votes	%	±%
Conservative	L. Hipkins	376	45.4	N/A
Labour	J. Lynch*	304	36.7	–14.4
Independent Liberal	L. Brown	148	17.9	N/A
Majority		72	8.7	N/A
Turnout		828	65.8	+15.8
Registered electors		1,271		
Conservative gain from Labour		Swing	N/A	

No Independent candidate as previous (48.9%).

=== Coggeshall ===
Coggeshall
Party	Candidate	Votes	%	±%
Conservative	D. McMillan	857	48.6	N/A
Conservative	B. Smith	814	46.2	N/A
Independent	W. Drake*	597	33.9	–1.8
Liberal	W. Onions*	553	31.4	–15.3
Labour	C. Causton	473	26.8	–1.9
Labour	B. Smith	454	25.8	–2.7
Labour	D. Simpson	381	21.6	N/A
Liberal	D. Sibley	339	19.2	N/A
Turnout		1,763	48.0	+3.5
Registered electors		3,673		
Conservative gain from Independent				
Conservative gain from Liberal				
Independent hold				

=== Colne Engaine & Greenstead Green ===
Colne Engaine & Greenstead Green
Party	Candidate	Votes	%	±%
Ind. Conservative	G. Courtauld*	Unopposed		
Registered electors		1,303		
Ind. Conservative hold				

=== Cressing ===
Cressing
Party	Candidate	Votes	%	±%
Conservative	E. Yockney	271	49.9	+4.2
Independent	A. Allen*	154	28.4	–25.9
Labour	M. Hills	118	21.7	N/A
Majority		117	21.5	N/A
Turnout		543	46.1	+16.3
Registered electors		1,179		
Conservative gain from Independent		Swing	▲15.1	

=== Earls Colne ===
Earls Colne
Party	Candidate	Votes	%	±%
Independent	L. Dearsley*	600	51.5	+4.6
Independent	P. Taylor*	588	50.5	–2.5
Labour	R. Turp	271	23.3	+12.1
Turnout		1,165	57.3	+6.4
Registered electors		2,033		
Independent hold				
Independent hold				

No Conservative candidate as previous (35.7%).

=== Gosfield ===
Gosfield
Party	Candidate	Votes	%	±%
Independent	D. Marlow	349	55.9	+7.6
Conservative	B. Brooks	275	44.1	N/A
Majority		74	11.9	N/A
Turnout		624	60.1	+22.1
Registered electors		1,040		
Independent gain from Independent		Swing	N/A	

No Independent candidate (Seymour) as previous (51.8%).

=== Halstead Holy Trinity ===
Halstead Holy Trinity
Party	Candidate	Votes	%	±%
Labour	R. Mayes	765	42.4	–13.6
Labour	K. Jones	696	38.6	–10.0
Conservative	C. Covell	670	37.1	N/A
Labour	N. Bugbee*	572	31.7	–14.9
Residents	D. Fuller	549	30.4	N/A
Turnout		1,805	52.3	+3.1
Registered electors		3,451		
Labour hold				
Labour hold				
Conservative gain from Labour				

No Liberal candidate as previous (44.0%).

=== Halstead St. Andrew's ===
Halstead St. Andrew's
Party	Candidate	Votes	%	±%
Residents	E. McDowell*	684	42.1	+2.7
Conservative	O. Joyce*	543	33.4	–2.2
Conservative	E. Starling	503	31.0	–1.2
Residents	M. Gage	494	30.4	+0.4
Labour	A. Bird	265	16.3	–8.6
Labour	D. Brede	261	16.1	–8.7
Turnout		1,625	55.0	–3.6
Registered electors		2,954		
Residents hold				
Conservative hold				

=== Hatfield Peverel ===
Hatfield Peverel
Party	Candidate	Votes	%	±%
Conservative	C. Leicester*	806	55.1	–1.8
Conservative	D. Claydon*	770	52.6	+2.5
Independent	M. Voysey	569	38.9	N/A
Labour	O. Deane	287	19.6	–23.5
Labour	P. Williams	237	16.2	–26.2
Turnout		1,464	54.8	+11.7
Registered electors		2,671		
Conservative hold				
Conservative hold				

=== Kelvedon ===
Kelvedon
Party	Candidate	Votes	%	±%
Independent	B. Andrews*	920	54.6	N/A
Conservative	M. Edwards	690	40.9	+19.7
Independent	J. De Deene Yule*	663	39.3	+1.7
Independent	B. Kentish*	606	36.0	+6.1
Conservative	A. Howard	488	29.0	–17.7
Conservative	D. Openshaw	465	27.6	+7.7
Labour	A. Bennett	333	19.8	+4.0
Labour	D. Wicks	324	19.2	+3.8
Turnout		1,685	55.5	+2.4
Registered electors		3,036		
Independent hold				
Conservative hold				
Independent hold				

=== No. 1 (Braintree: East) ===
No. 1 (Braintree: East)
Party	Candidate	Votes	%	±%
Conservative	P. Adams	993	50.5	+22.8
Conservative	J. Chapman	967	49.1	+23.9
Conservative	J. Haley	953	48.4	+23.3
Conservative	D. Platt	946	48.1	+24.8
Labour	G. Warren*	884	44.9	+2.2
Labour	H. Warren*	844	42.9	+2.5
Labour	W. Clarke	827	42.0	+3.6
Labour	I. Kerlogue	779	39.6	+2.0
Turnout		1,968	38.9	–2.1
Registered electors		5,059		
Conservative gain from Labour				
Conservative gain from Labour				
Conservative gain from Labour				
Conservative gain from Labour				

No Liberal (24.7%) or Communist (5.0%) candidates as previous.

=== No. 2 (Braintree: West) ===
No. 2 (Braintree: West)
Party	Candidate	Votes	%	±%
Conservative	S. Harper*	1,389	51.1	+16.7
Conservative	D. Legg*	1,272	46.8	+16.9
Liberal	J. Ross*	1,229	45.2	+3.2
Conservative	H. Everitt	1,203	44.2	+17.3
Liberal	D. Harvey	1,104	40.6	+4.8
Conservative	C. Murcott	1,020	37.5	+14.3
Labour	G. Keggen	657	24.2	+0.6
Labour	E. Lynch	640	23.5	+4.0
Labour	F. Childs	560	20.6	+2.7
Labour	M. Skirvington	528	19.4	+2.3
Turnout		2,720	55.7	–5.9
Registered electors		4,883		
Conservative hold				
Conservative hold				
Liberal hold				
Conservative gain from Liberal				

=== No. 3 (Bocking: North) ===
No. 3 (Bocking: North)
Party	Candidate	Votes	%	±%
Conservative	E. Davis	939	50.3	+9.3
Conservative	M. Tregaron	935	50.1	+9.2
Conservative	A. Cross	903	48.4	+10.1
Labour	A. Everard*	831	44.5	–14.6
Labour	A. Millam*	746	40.0	–9.5
Labour	R. Watson	711	38.1	–15.8
Turnout		1,867	49.3	+8.4
Registered electors		3,786		
Conservative gain from Labour				
Conservative gain from Labour				
Conservative gain from Labour				

=== No. 4 (Bocking: South) ===
No. 4 (Bocking: South)
Party	Candidate	Votes	%	±%
Conservative	A. Comfort	1,298	48.0	+22.0
Conservative	R. Perkin	1,238	45.8	+25.2
Conservative	R. Davis	1,164	43.0	+23.2
Conservative	T. Adcock	1,109	41.0	+21.5
Labour	G. Warne*	1,090	40.3	–5.0
Labour	J. Perks	1,040	38.5	+2.4
Labour	R. Suckling*	1,000	37.0	–1.9
Labour	A. Mackenzie*	827	30.6	–2.4
Liberal	D. Colchester	503	18.6	–10.1
Liberal	B. Meech	479	17.7	–9.4
Turnout		2,704	42.9	–12.7
Registered electors		6,302		
Conservative gain from Labour				
Conservative gain from Labour				
Conservative gain from Labour				
Conservative gain from Labour				

=== No. 7 (Witham: West) ===
No. 7 (Witham: West)
Party	Candidate	Votes	%	±%
Conservative	D. Willetts	935	58.7	+42.0
Conservative	M. Lager	888	55.7	+40.2
Labour	E. Hatton	500	31.4	+5.7
Labour	J. Halton	428	26.9	+2.3
Communist	F. Brown	144	9.0	+1.0
Turnout		1,594	40.2	+1.3
Registered electors		3,966		
Conservative gain from Independent				
Conservative gain from Independent				

No Independent (38.7%, 33.0%) or Liberal (10.9%) candidates as previous.

=== No. 8 (Witham: North) ===
No. 8 (Witham: North)
Party	Candidate	Votes	%	±%
Labour	A. Bentley*	688	51.5	+7.4
Labour	S. Smith*	668	50.0	+5.5
Conservative	E. Quick	563	42.1	+26.1
Conservative	F. Mansbridge	552	41.3	+28.8
Turnout		1,336	35.4	–0.1
Registered electors		3,774		
Labour hold				
Labour hold				

No Independent candidates as previous (26.0%, 13.4%, 12.3%).

=== No. 9 (Witham: Rivenhall South) ===
No. 9 (Witham: Rivenhall South)
Party	Candidate	Votes	%	±%
Labour	J. Lyon*	655	51.1	+1.4
Labour	R. Bartlett*	601	46.8	–7.2
Conservative	P. Cutmore	569	44.3	+9.5
Conservative	A. Pembroke	559	43.6	–2.4
Turnout		1,283	56.9	+6.0
Registered electors		2,254		
Labour hold				
Labour hold				

=== No. 10 (Witham: Rivenhall South) ===
No. 10 (Witham: Rivenhall South)
Party	Candidate	Votes	%	±%
Conservative	K. Richards	325	35.5	N/A
Labour	C. Edwards*	305	33.3	+0.1
Labour	R. Edwards	286	31.2	–7.5
Turnout		916	56.5	+14.6
Registered electors		1,621		
Conservative gain from Labour				
Labour hold				

=== No. 11 (Witham: Central) ===
No. 11 (Witham: Central)
Party	Candidate	Votes	%	±%
Independent	H. Pitchworth*	339	58.1	+11.8
Conservative	P. Gibbs	206	35.3	–6.2
Labour	D. Oliver	38	6.5	+1.3
Majority		133	22.8	+18.0
Turnout		583	57.7	+4.9
Registered electors		1,013		
Independent hold		Swing	▲9.0	

No Liberal candidate as previous (7.1%).

=== No. 12 (Witham: South) ===
No. 12 (Witham: South)
Party	Candidate	Votes	%	±%
Labour	J. Howe*	475	55.5	+0.3
Conservative	T. Stead	381	44.5	N/A
Majority		94	11.0	+0.6
Turnout		856	48.2	+1.6
Registered electors		1,776		
Labour hold		Swing	N/A	

No Independent candidate as previous (44.8%).

=== Panfield ===
Panfield
Party	Candidate	Votes	%	±%
Conservative	R. Chandler*	399	59.3	+6.9
Labour	C. Evans	274	40.7	–6.9
Majority		125	18.6	+13.8
Turnout		673	59.7	+13.6
Registered electors		1,136		
Conservative hold		Swing	▲6.9	

=== Rayne ===
Rayne
Party	Candidate	Votes	%	±%
Conservative	C. Crossman	517	65.4	N/A
Liberal	F. Little	158	20.0	N/A
Labour	K. Locke*	115	14.6	–21.4
Majority		359	45.4	N/A
Turnout		790	53.1	+12.1
Registered electors		1,491		
Conservative gain from Independent		Swing	N/A	

=== Sible Headingham ===
Sible Headingham
Party	Candidate	Votes	%	±%
Independent	G. Tanner*	787	82.2	+45.7
Conservative	H. Hall	719	75.1	+40.3
Labour	C. Funnell	198	20.7	–8.0
Labour	E. Gray	166	17.3	+2.7
Turnout		958	41.2	–20.5
Registered electors		2,325		
Independent hold				
Conservative hold				

=== Stour Valley Central ===
Stour Valley Central
Party	Candidate	Votes	%	±%
Conservative	K. Nott*	431	77.9	+6.5
Labour	P. Wallis	122	22.1	–6.5
Majority		309	55.9	+13.0
Turnout		553	50.6	+3.9
Registered electors		1,095		
Conservative hold		Swing	▲6.5	

=== Stour Valley North ===
Stour Valley North
Party	Candidate	Votes	%	±%
Conservative	C. Basham	Unopposed		
Registered electors		1,051		
Conservative gain from Independent				

=== Stour Valley South ===
Stour Valley South
Party	Candidate	Votes	%	±%
Conservative	R. Clark	506	68.1	+20.2
Independent	A. Champion	237	31.9	N/A
Majority		269	36.2	+35.8
Turnout		743	51.8	–1.4
Registered electors		1,434		
Conservative hold		Swing	N/A	

No Independent (Nott, 47.5%) or Labour (4.5%) candidates as previous.

=== Terling ===
Terling
Party	Candidate	Votes	%	±%
Conservative	G. Isted*	425	78.0	+13.5
Labour	C. Foy	120	22.0	–13.5
Majority		305	56.0	+26.9
Turnout		545	44.1	–1.1
Registered electors		1,239		
Conservative hold		Swing	▲13.5	

=== Three Fields ===
Three Fields
Party	Candidate	Votes	%	±%
Conservative	R. Hawkins*	941	63.4	+24.0
Conservative	O. Montefiore*	856	57.7	+25.9
Labour	G. Hildrey	599	40.4	+11.3
Turnout		1,484	60.0	+13.6
Registered electors		2,473		
Conservative hold				
Conservative hold				

No Independent candidates as previous (31.5%, 30.5%, 20.6%, 14.4%).

=== Upper Colne ===
Upper Colne
Party	Candidate	Votes	%	±%
Conservative	D. Johnson*	Unopposed		
Registered electors		1,223		
Conservative hold				

=== Yeldham ===
Yeldham
Party	Candidate	Votes	%	±%
Conservative	R. Liming	Unopposed		
Registered electors		1,228		
Conservative gain from Ind. Conservative				
