= 1973 Braintree District Council election =

Braintree District Council election

7 June 1973	1976 →

All 58 seats to Braintree District Council 30 seats needed for a majority
- Turnout: 47.8%

	First party	Second party	Third party
Party	Labour	Conservative	Independent
Seats won	22	15	15
Popular vote	25,332	19,498	11,349
Percentage	39.2%	30.2%	17.6%
	Fourth party	Fifth party	Sixth party
Party	Liberal	Ind. Conservative	Residents
Seats won	3	2	1
Popular vote	6,319	613	1,137
Percentage	9.8%	0.9%	1.8%
Council control after election
No overall control

The 1973 Braintree District Council election took place on 7 June 1973 to elect members of Braintree District Council in England. This was on the same day as other local elections.

This was the inaugural election of Braintree District Council.

== Summary ==
=== Election result ===
1973 Braintree District Council election
Party	Seats	Gains	Losses	Net gain/loss	Seats %	Votes %	Votes	+/−
Labour	22	N/A	N/A	N/A	37.9	39.2	25,332	N/A
Conservative	15	N/A	N/A	N/A	25.9	30.2	19,498	N/A
Independent	15	N/A	N/A	N/A	25.9	17.6	11,349	N/A
Liberal	3	N/A	N/A	N/A	5.2	9.8	6,319	N/A
Ind. Conservative	2	N/A	N/A	N/A	3.4	0.9	613	N/A
Residents	1	N/A	N/A	N/A	1.7	1.8	1,137	N/A
Communist	0	N/A	N/A	N/A	0.0	0.6	411	N/A

== Ward results ==
=== Black Notley ===
Black Notley
Party	Candidate	Votes	%
Conservative	E. Mills	269	57.0
Labour	B. Burden	142	30.1
Independent	T. Ward	61	12.9
Majority		127	26.9
Turnout		472	39.7
Registered electors		1,188	
Conservative win (new seat)			

=== Bumpstead ===
Bumpstead
Party	Candidate	Votes	%
Independent	S. Drapkin	381	77.9
Labour	M. Watson	63	12.9
Independent	G. King	45	9.2
Majority		318	65.0
Turnout		489	39.8
Registered electors		1,228	
Independent win (new seat)			

=== Castle Headingham ===
Castle Headingham
Party	Candidate	Votes	%
Labour	J. Lynch	302	51.1
Independent	L. Barrington	289	48.9
Majority		13	2.2
Turnout		591	50.0
Registered electors		1,183	
Labour win (new seat)			

=== Coggeshall ===
Coggeshall
Party	Candidate	Votes	%
Independent	C. Sansom	660	
Liberal	W. Onions	614	
Independent	W. Drake	469	
Independent	W. McMillan	403	
Independent	C. Potter	402	
Independent	L. Brough	398	
Labour	F. Dearman	378	
Labour	R. Miles	375	
Independent	R. Few	246	
Turnout		1,653	44.5
Registered electors		3,715	
Independent win (new seat)			
Liberal win (new seat)			
Independent win (new seat)			

=== Colne Engaine & Greenstead Green ===
Colne Engaine & Greenstead Green
Party	Candidate	Votes	%
Ind. Conservative	G. Courtauld	344	58.7
Independent	E. Wilson	161	27.5
Labour	J. Plumb	81	13.8
Majority		183	31.2
Turnout		586	45.3
Registered electors		1,295	
Ind. Conservative win (new seat)			

=== Cressing ===
Cressing
Party	Candidate	Votes	%
Independent	A. Allen	194	54.3
Conservative	P. Ratcliffe	163	45.7
Majority		31	8.7
Turnout		357	29.8
Registered electors		1,199	
Independent win (new seat)			

=== Earls Colne ===
Earls Colne
Party	Candidate	Votes	%
Independent	P. Taylor	557	53.0
Independent	L. Dearsley	492	46.9
Conservative	M. Walker	375	35.7
Labour	D. Lock	118	11.2
Turnout		1,050	50.9
Registered electors		2,062	
Independent win (new seat)			
Independent win (new seat)			

=== Gosfield ===
Gosfield
Party	Candidate	Votes	%
Independent	G. Seymour	207	51.8
Independent	D. Marlow	193	48.3
Majority		14	3.5
Turnout		400	38.0
Registered electors		1,054	
Independent win (new seat)			

=== Halstead Holy Trinity ===
Halstead Holy Trinity
Party	Candidate	Votes	%
Labour	J. Cutting	889	56.0
Labour	R. Dixey	772	48.6
Labour	N. Bugbee	740	46.6
Liberal	R. Graham	699	44.0
Turnout		1,587	49.2
Registered electors		3,225	
Labour win (new seat)			
Labour win (new seat)			
Labour win (new seat)			

=== Halstead St. Andrew's ===
Halstead St. Andrew's
Party	Candidate	Votes	%
Residents	E. McDowell	646	39.4
Conservative	O. Joyce	584	35.6
Conservative	R. Starling	528	32.2
Residents	M. Gage	491	30.0
Labour	R. Mayes	408	24.9
Labour	K. Jones	407	24.8
Turnout		1,639	58.6
Registered electors		2,796	
Residents win (new seat)			
Conservative win (new seat)			

=== Hatfield Peverel ===
Hatfield Peverel
Party	Candidate	Votes	%
Conservative	C. Leicester	657	56.9
Conservative	D. Claydon	578	50.1
Labour	J. Gilbert	497	43.1
Labour	A. Deane	489	42.4
Turnout		1,154	43.1
Registered electors		2,677	
Conservative win (new seat)			
Conservative win (new seat)			

=== Kelvedon ===
Kelvedon
Party	Candidate	Votes	%
Conservative	B. Andrews	761	46.7
Independent	J. De Denne Yule	613	37.6
Independent	B. Kentish	488	29.9
Conservative	M. Edwards	346	21.2
Conservative	C. Crowe	325	19.9
Labour	E. Hatton	257	15.8
Labour	J. Reekie	251	15.4
Labour	H. Young	250	15.3
Turnout		1,631	53.1
Registered electors		3,072	
Conservative win (new seat)			
Independent win (new seat)			
Independent win (new seat)			

=== No. 1 (Braintree: East) ===
No. 1 (Braintree: East)
Party	Candidate	Votes	%
Labour	G. Warren	877	42.7
Labour	H. Warren	829	40.4
Labour	W. Clarke	789	38.4
Labour	T. Dearman	771	37.6
Conservative	A. Lobb	569	27.7
Conservative	M. Hammond	517	25.2
Conservative	R. Tyrell	515	25.1
Liberal	L. Brown	507	24.7
Conservative	M. Vernon	478	23.3
Communist	B. O'Hare	102	5.0
Turnout		2,053	41.0
Registered electors		5,008	
Labour win (new seat)			
Labour win (new seat)			
Labour win (new seat)			
Labour win (new seat)			

=== No. 2 (Braintree: West) ===
No. 2 (Braintree: West)
Party	Candidate	Votes	%
Liberal	J. Ross	1,257	42.0
Liberal	M. Collins	1,071	35.8
Conservative	S. Harper	1,030	34.4
Conservative	D. Legg	949	31.7
Conservative	H. Everitt	805	26.9
Labour	P. Kent	706	23.6
Conservative	D. Church	694	23.2
Labour	L. Baker	584	19.5
Labour	B. Hearn	535	17.9
Labour	J. Pryke	512	17.1
Turnout		2,991	61.6
Registered electors		4,855	
Liberal win (new seat)			
Liberal win (new seat)			
Conservative win (new seat)			
Conservative win (new seat)			

=== No. 3 (Bocking: North) ===
No. 3 (Bocking: North)
Party	Candidate	Votes	%
Labour	A. Everard	853	59.1
Labour	S. Hounsell	778	53.9
Labour	A. Millam	715	49.5
Conservative	M. Lewis	592	41.0
Conservative	M. Illingworth	590	40.9
Conservative	A. Wyatt	553	38.3
Turnout		1,444	40.9
Registered electors		3,530	
Labour win (new seat)			
Labour win (new seat)			
Labour win (new seat)			

=== No. 4 (Bocking: South) ===
No. 4 (Bocking: South)
Party	Candidate	Votes	%
Labour	G. Warne	1,403	45.3
Labour	R. Suckling	1,205	38.9
Labour	R. Watson	1,116	36.1
Labour	A. Mackenzie	1,031	33.3
Liberal	L. Goddard	889	28.7
Liberal	W. Margetts	839	27.1
Conservative	A. Comfort	804	26.0
Conservative	J. Ireson	638	20.6
Conservative	J. Overfield	612	19.8
Conservative	C. Murcott	602	19.5
Turnout		3,095	55.6
Registered electors		5,566	
Labour win (new seat)			
Labour win (new seat)			
Labour win (new seat)			
Labour win (new seat)			

=== No. 7 (Witham: West) ===
No. 7 (Witham: West)
Party	Candidate	Votes	%
Independent	I. Kinloch	488	38.7
Independent	W. Shortridge	416	33.0
Labour	D. Clampin	324	25.7
Labour	J. Keeling	310	24.6
Conservative	D. Willetts	210	16.7
Conservative	M. Lager	195	15.5
Liberal	M. Sadler	137	10.9
Communist	F. Brown	101	8.0
Turnout		1,260	38.9
Registered electors		3,238	
Independent win (new seat)			
Independent win (new seat)			

=== No. 8 (Witham: North) ===
No. 8 (Witham: North)
Party	Candidate	Votes	%
Labour	S. Smith	574	44.5
Labour	A. Bentley	568	44.1
Independent	J. Sweeting	335	26.0
Conservative	G. Gibbs	206	16.0
Independent	I. Sullivan	173	13.4
Conservative	P. Gibbs	161	12.5
Independent	B. Lowry	159	12.3
Turnout		1,289	35.5
Registered electors		3,631	
Labour win (new seat)			
Labour win (new seat)			

=== No. 9 (Witham: Rivenhall North) ===
No. 9 (Witham: Rivenhall North)
Party	Candidate	Votes	%
Labour	R. Bartlett	526	54.0
Labour	J. Lyon	484	49.7
Conservative	N. Wallace	448	46.0
Conservative	P. Cutmore	339	34.8
Turnout		974	50.9
Registered electors		1,913	
Labour win (new seat)			
Labour win (new seat)			

=== No. 10 (Witham: Rivenhall South) ===
No. 10 (Witham: Rivenhall South)
Party	Candidate	Votes	%
Labour	D. Wicks	271	38.7
Labour	C. Edwards	233	33.2
Independent	J. Valentine	195	27.8
Liberal	D. Sibley	140	20.0
Independent	P. Bond	95	13.6
Independent	S. Jones	93	13.3
Turnout		701	41.9
Registered electors		1,672	
Labour win (new seat)			
Labour win (new seat)			

=== No. 11 (Witham: Central) ===
No. 11 (Witham: Central)
Party	Candidate	Votes	%
Independent	H. Pitchforth	242	46.3
Conservative	K. Richards	217	41.5
Liberal	D. Cudmore	37	7.1
Labour	D. Franklin	27	5.2
Majority		25	4.8
Turnout		523	52.8
Registered electors		991	
Independent win (new seat)			

=== No. 12 (Witham: South) ===
No. 12 (Witham: South)
Party	Candidate	Votes	%
Labour	J. Howe	372	55.2
Independent	M. Cooper-Cocks	302	44.8
Majority		70	10.4
Turnout		674	46.6
Registered electors		1,445	
Labour win (new seat)			

=== Panfield ===
Panfield
Party	Candidate	Votes	%
Conservative	R. Chandler	282	52.4
Labour	R. Budge	256	47.6
Majority		26	4.8
Turnout		538	46.1
Registered electors		1,167	
Conservative win (new seat)			

=== Rayne ===
Rayne
Party	Candidate	Votes	%
Independent	R. Carder	261	64.0
Labour	K. Locke	147	36.0
Majority		114	27.9
Turnout		408	32.0
Registered electors		1,274	
Independent win (new seat)			

=== Sible Headingham ===
Sible Headingham
Party	Candidate	Votes	%
Independent	G. Tanner	544	36.5
Conservative	P. Belither	518	34.8
Labour	J. Waldron	428	28.7
Labour	E. Snarey	217	14.6
Turnout		1,489	61.7
Registered electors		2,413	
Independent win (new seat)			
Conservative win (new seat)			

=== Stour Valley Central ===
Stour Valley Central
Party	Candidate	Votes	%
Conservative	K. Nott	375	71.4
Labour	L. Tolliday	150	28.6
Majority		225	42.9
Turnout		525	46.7
Registered electors		1,123	
Conservative win (new seat)			

=== Stour Valley North ===
Stour Valley North
Party	Candidate	Votes	%
Independent	E. Powell	365	75.6
Labour	P. Ellis	118	24.4
Majority		247	51.1
Turnout		483	43.6
Registered electors		1,107	
Independent win (new seat)			

=== Stour Valley South ===
Stour Valley South
Party	Candidate	Votes	%
Conservative	J. Abinger	338	47.9
Independent	G. Nott	335	47.5
Labour	M. Andrews	32	4.5
Majority		3	0.4
Turnout		705	53.2
Registered electors		1,326	
Conservative win (new seat)			

=== Terling ===
Terling
Party	Candidate	Votes	%
Conservative	G. Isted	364	64.5
Labour	C. Foy	200	35.5
Majority		164	29.1
Turnout		564	45.2
Registered electors		1,248	
Conservative win (new seat)			

=== Three Fields ===
Three Fields
Party	Candidate	Votes	%
Conservative	R. Hawkins	443	39.4
Conservative	O. Sebag-Monteflore	357	31.8
Independent	J. Nottage	354	31.5
Independent	W. Crossman	342	30.5
Labour	E. Gray	327	29.1
Independent	E. Cox	231	20.6
Labour	C. Westwood	221	19.7
Independent	J. Bowen Roberts	162	14.4
Turnout		1,123	46.4
Registered electors		2,420	
Conservative win (new seat)			
Conservative win (new seat)			

=== Upper Colne ===
Upper Colne
Party	Candidate	Votes	%
Conservative	D. Johnson	511	67.1
Labour	G. Watson	250	32.9
Majority		261	34.3
Turnout		761	61.5
Registered electors		1,238	
Conservative win (new seat)			

=== Yeldham ===
Yeldham
Party	Candidate	Votes	%
Ind. Conservative	P. Innes	269	34.5
Communist	J. Cohen	208	26.7
Labour	W. Elliott	174	22.3
Liberal	R. Wilson	129	16.5
Majority		61	7.8
Turnout		780	63.7
Registered electors		1,225	
Ind. Conservative win (new seat)			
