= 1979 Braintree District Council election =

English election

- 3 May 1979

All 58 seats to Braintree District Council 30 seats needed for a majority
- Turnout: 77.6% (▲28.3%)

	First party	Second party	Third party
Party	Conservative	Labour	Independent
Last election	39 seats, 48.0%	8 seats, 34.0%	8 seats, 9.0%
Seats won	28	17	7
Seat change	▼11	▲9	▼1
Popular vote	54,148	42,436	6,068
Percentage	46.5%	36.5%	5.2%
Swing	▼1.5%	▲2.5%	▼3.8%
	Fourth party	Fifth party	Sixth party
Party	Liberal	Residents	Ind. Conservative
Last election	1 seat, 6.2%	1 seat, 2.4%	1 seat, 0.0%
Seats won	3	2	1
Seat change	▲2	▲1	Steady
Popular vote	9,855	2,797	408
Percentage	8.5%	2.4%	0.4%
Swing	▲2.3%	0.0%	N/A
- Winner of each seat at the 1979 Braintree District Council election
Council control before election
Conservative
Council control after election
No overall control

The 1979 Braintree District Council election took place on 3 May 1979 to elect members of Braintree District Council in England. This was on the same day as the 1979 UK general election and other local elections across the United Kingdom.

At the election, the Conservatives lost control of the council to no overall control despite remaining the largest party.

== Summary ==
=== Election result ===
1979 Braintree District Council election
Party	Seats	Gains	Losses	Net gain/loss	Seats %	Votes %	Votes	+/−
Conservative	28	1	2	▼11	48.3	46.5	54,148	–1.5
Labour	17	0	0	▲9	29.3	36.5	42,436	+2.5
Independent	7	0	1	▼1	12.1	5.2	6,068	–3.8
Liberal	3	1	0	▲2	5.2	8.5	9,855	+2.3
Residents	2	1	0	▲1	3.4	2.4	2,797	±0.0
Ind. Conservative	1	0	0	Steady	1.7	0.4	408	N/A
Independent Liberal	0	0	0	Steady	0.0	0.4	484	+0.2
Communist	0	0	0	Steady	0.0	0.1	173	–0.1

== Ward results ==
=== Black Notley ===
Black Notley
Party	Candidate	Votes	%	±%
Conservative	E. Mills	821	75.3	+1.1
Labour	D. Beardwell	270	24.7	–1.1
Majority		551	50.5	+2.0
Turnout		1,091	75.8	+32.8
Registered electors		1,412		
Conservative hold		Swing	▲1.1	

=== Bocking North ===
Bocking North
Party	Candidate	Votes	%
Labour	A. Millam	1,569	49.7
Labour	J. Hall	1,514	48.0
Conservative	E. Davis	1,470	46.6
Labour	C. Sheret	1,441	45.7
Conservative	B. Steel	1,428	45.3
Conservative	S. Brown	1,407	44.6
Turnout		3,155	75.0
Registered electors		4,207	
Labour win (new seat)			
Labour win (new seat)			
Conservative win (new seat)			

=== Bocking South ===
Bocking South
Party	Candidate	Votes	%
Labour	G. Warne	1,753	53.8
Labour	A. Mackenzie	1,568	48.1
Labour	R. Watson	1,548	47.5
Conservative	A. Comfort	1,456	44.7
Conservative	R. Perkin	1,408	43.2
Conservative	T. Adcock	1,396	42.8
Turnout		3,260	75.1
Registered electors		4,341	
Labour win (new seat)			
Labour win (new seat)			
Labour win (new seat)			

=== Braintree Central ===
Braintree Central
Party	Candidate	Votes	%
Labour	G. Warren	1,683	53.4
Labour	J. Perks	1,594	50.6
Labour	M. Shirvington	1,560	49.5
Conservative	B. Britten	1,363	43.2
Conservative	D. Sayers	1,338	42.4
Conservative	J. Moll	1,277	40.5
Turnout		3,152	73.9
Registered electors		4,265	
Labour win (new seat)			
Labour win (new seat)			
Labour win (new seat)			

=== Braintree East ===
Braintree East
Party	Candidate	Votes	%
Conservative	P. Gilthorpe	1,399	40.3
Conservative	J. Amies	1,331	38.3
Conservative	A. Plumb	1,310	37.7
Labour	M. Oliver	1,097	31.6
Labour	C. Oliver	1,079	31.1
Labour	P. Woollard	1,004	28.9
Liberal	R. Allen	875	25.2
Liberal	K. Webb	820	23.6
Liberal	I. Hamlin	814	23.5
Turnout		3,471	76.0
Registered electors		4,567	
Conservative win (new seat)			
Conservative win (new seat)			
Conservative win (new seat)			

=== Braintree West ===
Braintree West
Party	Candidate	Votes	%
Liberal	J. Ross	1,881	51.0
Liberal	J. Bryan	1,654	44.8
Conservative	S. Harper	1,482	40.2
Liberal	P. Farnell	1,460	39.6
Conservative	H. Everitt	1,350	36.6
Conservative	C. Murcott	1,254	34.0
Labour	M. Gore	563	15.3
Labour	D. Green	487	13.2
Turnout		3,689	79.7
Registered electors		4,629	
Liberal win (new seat)			
Liberal win (new seat)			
Conservative win (new seat)			

=== Bumpstead ===
Bumpstead
Party	Candidate	Votes	%	±%
Conservative	S. Drapkin	Unopposed		
Registered electors		1,276		
Conservative hold				

=== Castle Headingham ===
Castle Headingham
Party	Candidate	Votes	%	±%
Conservative	P. Schwier	592	54.6	+9.2
Labour	J. Lynch	493	45.4	+8.7
Majority		99	9.1	+0.4
Turnout		1,085	79.6	+13.8
Registered electors		1,334		
Conservative hold		Swing	▲0.3	

No Independent Liberal candidate as previous (17.9%).

=== Coggeshall ===
Coggeshall
Party	Candidate	Votes	%	±%
Independent	W. Drake	1,554	52.4	+18.5
Conservative	D. Bellamy	1,438	48.5	+2.3
Conservative	D. McMillan	1,397	47.1	–1.5
Conservative	H. Portway	1,132	38.2	N/A
Liberal	D. Sibley	897	30.3	–1.1
Labour	A. McCracken	827	27.9	+1.1
Turnout		2,963	79.5	+31.5
Registered electors		3,727		
Independent hold				
Conservative hold				
Conservative hold				

=== Colne Engaine & Greenstead Green ===
Colne Engaine & Greenstead Green
Party	Candidate	Votes	%	±%
Ind. Conservative	G. Courtauld	Unopposed		
Registered electors		1,314		
Ind. Conservative hold				

=== Cressing ===
Cressing
Party	Candidate	Votes	%	±%
Liberal	J. Chapman	357	38.2	N/A
Conservative	E. Yockney	336	36.0	–13.9
Independent	A. Allen	241	25.8	–2.6
Majority		21	2.2	N/A
Turnout		934	76.6	+30.5
Registered electors		1,212		
Liberal gain from Conservative		Swing	N/A	

No Labour candidate as previous (21.7%).

=== Earls Colne ===
Earls Colne
Party	Candidate	Votes	%	±%
Independent	C. Holmes	995	54.8	N/A
Independent	P. Taylor	628	34.6	–15.9
Independent Liberal	R. Bird	484	26.7	N/A
Conservative	T. Allsopp	425	23.4	N/A
Conservative	M. Long	408	22.5	N/A
Labour	M. Jarrett	316	17.4	N/A
Labour	R. Turp	298	16.4	–6.9
Turnout		1,816	79.7	+22.4
Registered electors		2,278		
Independent hold				
Independent hold				

=== Gosfield ===
Gosfield
Party	Candidate	Votes	%	±%
Independent	D. Marlow	Unopposed		
Registered electors		1,060		
Independent hold				

=== Halstead Holy Trinity ===
Halstead Holy Trinity
Party	Candidate	Votes	%	±%
Residents	E. McDowell	1,548	54.9	N/A
Labour	R. Mayes	1,423	50.5	+8.1
Labour	N. Bugbee	1,209	42.9	+11.2
Labour	M. Finken	1,023	36.3	–2.3
Conservative	C. Covell	1,018	36.1	–1.0
Conservative	D. Thompson	921	32.7	N/A
Turnout		2,819	78.4	–26.1
Registered electors		3,596		
Residents gain from Conservative				
Labour hold				
Labour hold				

=== Halstead St. Andrew's ===
Halstead St. Andrew's
Party	Candidate	Votes	%	±%
Residents	M. Gage	1,249	51.3	+20.9
Conservative	O. Joyce	1,150	47.2	+13.8
Conservative	J. Mitchell	727	29.9	–1.1
Labour	K. Jones	677	27.8	+11.5
Labour	J. Atherton	592	24.3	+8.2
Turnout		2,434	77.2	+22.2
Registered electors		3,153		
Residents hold				
Conservative hold				

=== Hatfield Peverel ===
Hatfield Peverel
Party	Candidate	Votes	%	±%
Conservative	C. Leicester	1,467	64.6	+9.5
Conservative	D. Claydon	1,404	61.8	+9.2
Labour	O. Deane	713	31.4	+11.8
Labour	J. Brooke	670	29.5	+13.3
Turnout		2,272	77.0	+22.2
Registered electors		2,950		
Conservative hold				
Conservative hold				

No Independent candidate as previous (38.9%).

=== Kelvedon ===
Kelvedon
Party	Candidate	Votes	%	±%
Conservative	M. Edwards	1,233	51.3	+10.4
Conservative	E. Clarke	1,171	48.7	+19.7
Independent	J. De Denne Yule	1,083	45.0	+5.7
Conservative	S. Gibbs	861	35.8	+8.2
Labour	B. Sherratt	707	29.4	+9.6
Labour	D. Rogers	693	28.8	+9.6
Labour	R. Sherratt	690	28.7	N/A
Ind. Conservative	P. Crowe	408	17.0	N/A
Turnout		2,405	80.3	+24.8
Registered electors		2,995		
Conservative hold				
Conservative gain from Independent				
Independent hold				

No Independent (Andrews, Kentish) candidates as previous (54.6%, 36.0%).

=== Panfield ===
Panfield
Party	Candidate	Votes	%	±%
Conservative	R. Chandler	735	74.8	+15.5
Labour	B. Burden	247	25.2	–15.5
Majority		488	49.7	+31.1
Turnout		982	82.0	+22.3
Registered electors		1,205		
Conservative hold		Swing	▲15.5	

=== Rayne ===
Rayne
Party	Candidate	Votes	%	±%
Conservative	C. Crossman	1,017	74.2	+8.8
Labour	E. Hall	353	25.8	+11.2
Majority		664	48.5	+3.1
Turnout		1,370	79.4	+26.3
Registered electors		1,707		
Conservative hold		Swing	▼1.2	

No Liberal candidate as previous (20.0%).

=== Sible Headingham ===
Sible Headingham
Party	Candidate	Votes	%	±%
Independent	G. Tanner	Unopposed		
Conservative	H. Hall	Unopposed		
Registered electors		2,430		
Independent hold				
Conservative hold				

=== Stour Valley Central ===
Stour Valley Central
Party	Candidate	Votes	%	±%
Conservative	K. Nott	Unopposed		
Registered electors		1,161		
Conservative hold				

=== Stour Valley North ===
Stour Valley North
Party	Candidate	Votes	%	±%
Conservative	C. Basham	Unopposed		
Registered electors		1,095		
Conservative hold				

=== Stour Valley South ===
Party	Candidate	Votes	%	±%
Conservative	R. Clark	Unopposed		
Registered electors		1,457		
Conservative hold				

=== Terling ===
Terling
Party	Candidate	Votes	%	±%
Conservative	G. Isted	720	73.8	–4.2
Labour	J. Ness	255	26.2	+4.2
Majority		465	47.7	–8.3
Turnout		975	76.7	+36.2
Registered electors		1,243		
Conservative hold		Swing	▼4.2	

=== Three Fields ===
Three Fields
Party	Candidate	Votes	%	±%
Conservative	R. Hawkins	1,183	57.6	–5.8
Conservative	D. Platt	951	46.3	–11.4
Independent	J. Finbow	825	40.1	N/A
Labour	J. Dyson	627	30.5	–9.9
Turnout		2,055	79.0	+19.0
Registered electors		2,601		
Conservative hold				
Conservative hold				

=== Upper Colne ===
Upper Colne
Party	Candidate	Votes	%	±%
Conservative	D. Johnson	Unopposed		
Registered electors		1,262		
Conservative hold				

=== Witham Central ===
Witham Central
Party	Candidate	Votes	%
Independent	H. Pitchforth	742	59.3
Conservative	J. Mills	371	29.7
Labour	L. Randall	138	11.0
Majority		371	29.7
Turnout		1,251	75.8
Registered electors		1,569	
Independent win (new seat)			

=== Witham Chipping Hill ===
Witham Chipping Hill
Party	Candidate	Votes	%
Labour	A. Slowman	1,091	51.8
Conservative	K. Richards	1,007	47.8
Labour	D. Sabin	891	42.3
Conservative	J. Dowding	870	41.3
Turnout		2,107	77.5
Registered electors		2,719	
Labour win (new seat)			
Conservative win (new seat)			

=== Witham North ===
Witham North
Party	Candidate	Votes	%
Labour	C. Edwards	1,402	51.7
Labour	B. Boshell	1,335	49.2
Labour	M. Fraser	1,290	47.5
Conservative	A. Ager	1,183	43.6
Conservative	T. Sheppard	1,150	42.4
Conservative	D. Williams	1,056	38.9
Turnout		2,713	76.0
Registered electors		3,570	
Labour win (new seat)			
Labour win (new seat)			
Labour win (new seat)			

=== Witham Silver End & Rivenhall ===
Witham Silver End & Rivenhall
Party	Candidate	Votes	%
Labour	J. Evans	1,168	54.6
Labour	J. Lyon	1,153	53.9
Conservative	P. Cutmore	979	45.8
Conservative	P. Digby	864	40.4
Turnout		2,139	80.6
Registered electors		2,654	
Labour win (new seat)			
Labour win (new seat)			

=== Witham South ===
Witham South
Party	Candidate	Votes	%
Conservative	J. Cooke	1,170	39.6
Labour	K. Boylan	1,140	38.6
Labour	B. Boshell	1,123	38.0
Conservative	B. Smith	1,109	37.5
Liberal	D. Bigg	603	20.4
Liberal	A. Bigg	494	16.7
Turnout		2,957	75.9
Registered electors		3,896	
Conservative win (new seat)			
Labour win (new seat)			

=== Witham West ===
Witham West
Party	Candidate	Votes	%
Conservative	M. Lager	1,000	55.5
Conservative	P. Gibbs	999	55.5
Labour	R. Green	757	42.0
Communist	F. Brown	173	9.6
Turnout		1,801	74.4
Registered electors		2,421	
Conservative win (new seat)			
Conservative win (new seat)			

=== Yeldham ===
Yeldham
Party	Candidate	Votes	%	±%
Conservative	J. Yeldham	614	60.3	N/A
Labour	T. Newton	405	39.7	N/A
Majority		209	20.5	N/A
Turnout		1,019	80.9	N/A
Registered electors		1,249		
Conservative hold		Swing	N/A	
