= Grade II* listed buildings in Uttlesford =

There are over 20,000 Grade II* listed buildings in England. This page is a list of these buildings in the district of Uttlesford in Essex.

== Uttlesford ==
| Name | Location | Type | Completed (Note: The date given is the date used by Historic England as significant for the initial building or that of an important part in the structure's description.) | Date designated | Grid ref. (Note: The grid reference is based on the British national grid reference system, sometimes known as OSGB36, used by the Ordnance Survey.) Geo-coordinates | Entry number (Note: The "List Entry Number" is a unique number assigned to each listed building and scheduled monument by Historic England.) | Image |
|---|---|---|---|---|---|---|---|
| Church of St Mary the Virgin | Arkesden, Uttlesford | Church | Norman | 21 February 1967 | TL4822534599; 51°59′24″N 0°09′26″E | 1170054 | Church of St Mary the Virgin More images |
| Guildhall | Church End, Ashdon | House | By 1501 | 26 November 1951 | TL5810341465; 52°02′57″N 0°18′15″E | 1112492 | Guildhall More images |
| Friars Grange Farmhouse | Aythorpe Roding | House | 16th century | 7 February 1952 | TL6038414324; 51°48′16″N 0°19′29″E | 1328492 | Friars Grange Farmhouse More images |
| Judds Cottage | Keeres Green, Aythorpe Roding | Hall House | Early 14th century | 17 October 1983 | TL5957614275; 51°48′16″N 0°18′47″E | 1141300 | Upload Photo |
| Parish Church of St Mary | Aythorpe Roding | Parish Church | 13th century | 23 February 1967 | TL5843415350; 51°48′52″N 0°17′49″E | 1141292 | Parish Church of St Mary More images |
| Aythorpe Roding Windmill | Gunners Green, Aythorpe Roding | Post Mill | Late 18th century | 23 February 1967 | TL5903415159; 51°48′45″N 0°18′20″E | 1328785 | Aythorpe Roding Windmill More images |
| Yeomans | Aythorpe Roding | Hall House | 14th century or 15th century | 17 October 1983 | TL6021015756; 51°49′03″N 0°19′23″E | 1328786 | Upload Photo |
| Barnston Hall | Barnston | House | 1920 | 7 February 1952 | TL6510819659; 51°51′04″N 0°23′45″E | 1322252 | Upload Photo |
| Barnston Lodge | Barnston | House | Late 18th century | 20 February 1967 | TL6544319666; 51°51′04″N 0°24′02″E | 1112886 | Barnston Lodge More images |
| Church of St Andrew | Barnston | Parish Church | c1160-1170 | 20 February 1967 | TL6523219624; 51°51′03″N 0°23′51″E | 1308903 | Church of St Andrew More images |
| The Old Rectory | Barnston | House | 18th century | 20 February 1967 | TL6563719473; 51°50′57″N 0°24′12″E | 1322254 | Upload Photo |
| Berden Hall | Berden | House | 16th century | 26 November 1951 | TL4674629505; 51°56′41″N 0°08′01″E | 1112468 | Upload Photo |
| Berden Priory | Berden | Farmhouse | 17th century | 26 November 1951 | TL4623830224; 51°57′05″N 0°07′35″E | 1112470 | Berden Priory More images |
| Well House and Treadmill to North of Berden Priory | Berden | Donkey Wheel | 17th century | 21 February 1967 | TL4622130257; 51°57′06″N 0°07′35″E | 1170289 | Upload Photo |
| Church of St Mary | Birchanger | Church | Early 12th century | 21 February 1967 | TL5073022781; 51°53′00″N 0°11′19″E | 1322445 | Church of St Mary More images |
| Barn to East of Church Hall | Church End, Broxted | Aisled Barn | Early 15th century | 20 February 1967 | TL5798127416; 51°55′22″N 0°17′45″E | 1112225 | Upload Photo |
| Church Hall | Church End, Broxted | House | Later alterations | 7 February 1952 | TL5791927397; 51°55′22″N 0°17′42″E | 1322561 | Upload Photo |
| Church of St Mary the Virgin | Broxted | Church | Early 13th century | 20 February 1967 | TL5784327380; 51°55′21″N 0°17′38″E | 1112251 | Church of St Mary the Virgin More images |
| Wood Farmhouse | Brick End, Broxted | Timber Framed House | Early 16th century or earlier | 24 October 1979 | TL5655726551; 51°54′56″N 0°16′30″E | 1306916 | Wood Farmhouse More images |
| Dovecote at Sibley's Farm | Chickney | Dovecote | Later | 7 February 1952 | TL5654429713; 51°56′38″N 0°16′34″E | 1322581 | Upload Photo |
| Sibley's Farmhouse | Chickney | Farmhouse | 14th century | 7 February 1952 | TL5655529744; 51°56′39″N 0°16′35″E | 1322580 | Upload Photo |
| The Bury | Clavering | House | Pre-Conquest - Norman | 26 November 1951 | TL4714431935; 51°57′59″N 0°08′26″E | 1170538 | Upload Photo |
| The Old Hall | Clavering | House | Later | 26 November 1951 | TL4702531724; 51°57′52″N 0°08′19″E | 1112414 | Upload Photo |
| 1–5 Church Walk | Clavering | Jettied House | Late 15th century | 21 February 1967 | TL4704431764; 51°57′54″N 0°08′20″E | 1112457 | 1–5 Church Walk More images |
| Brick House Farmhouse | Debden | Farmhouse | 15th century | 26 November 1951 | TL5444634094; 51°59′02″N 0°14′51″E | 1112375 | Upload Photo |
| New Amberden Hall | Debden Green, Debden | House | c. 1670 | 26 November 1951 | TL5621830513; 51°57′04″N 0°16′18″E | 1112407 | Upload Photo |
| Church of St Nicholas | Elmdon | Church | 15th century | 21 February 1967 | TL4619439663; 52°02′10″N 0°07′48″E | 1112358 | Church of St Nicholas More images |
| Pigots | Elmdon | Moat | Early 16th century | 21 February 1967 | TL4633739193; 52°01′55″N 0°07′54″E | 1322504 | Upload Photo |
| Barn to North West of Waterside Preparatory School, on the West Side of the Yard | Hassobury, Farnham | Barn | c. 1300 | 22 February 1980 | TL4845125220; 51°54′21″N 0°09′24″E | 1112313 | Upload Photo |
| Boote House | Felsted | Jettied House | c. 1596 | 7 February 1952 | TL6768620351; 51°51′24″N 0°26′01″E | 1308644 | Boote House More images |
| House Adjoining and now integral with Boote House | Felsted | House | C20 | 7 February 1952 | TL6769020340; 51°51′23″N 0°26′01″E | 1112870 | House Adjoining and now integral with Boote House |
| Bury Farm Barn 50 Metres to North West | Felsted | Timber Framed Barn | Late 16th century | 22 May 1978 | TL6757720519; 51°51′29″N 0°25′55″E | 1112865 | Upload Photo |
| Hartford End Mill | Hartford End, Felsted | House | Late 18th century | 6 August 1984 | TL6854017322; 51°49′45″N 0°26′40″E | 1112855 | Hartford End Mill More images |
| Ingrams Close | Felsted | House | c. 1800 | 20 February 1967 | TL6777520417; 51°51′26″N 0°26′05″E | 1146667 | Upload Photo |
| Leez Priory Fisherman's Hut | Felsted | House | Mid 16th century | 20 February 1967 | TL7004018593; 51°50′24″N 0°28′01″E | 1112816 | Upload Photo |
| Old Schoolmasters House adjacent to Old School to the East | Felsted | Jettied House | Early 16th century | 7 February 1952 | TL6768320367; 51°51′24″N 0°26′01″E | 1322255 | Old Schoolmasters House adjacent to Old School to the East More images |
| The Pavilion | Felsted | House | Mid 16th century | 6 August 1984 | TL6795820478; 51°51′27″N 0°26′15″E | 1112891 | Upload Photo |
| Old Vicarage | Great Chesterford | House | 19th century | 21 February 1967 | TL5064142779; 52°03′46″N 0°11′46″E | 1112297 | Old Vicarage More images |
| Brands Farmhouse | Great Dunmow | Farmhouse | 14th century | 7 February 1952 | TL6085719396; 51°51′00″N 0°20′02″E | 1098283 | Upload Photo |
| Brook House | Great Dunmow | Kitchen | 16th century | 20 February 1967 | TL6272222412; 51°52′36″N 0°21′45″E | 1076533 | Upload Photo |
| Diabold | Great Dunmow | House | Earlier | 20 February 1967 | TL6274521945; 51°52′20″N 0°21′45″E | 1328241 | Upload Photo |
| Maltings at Boyes Croft | Great Dunmow | Maltings | Early 16th century | 2 June 1971 | TL6283922034; 51°52′23″N 0°21′50″E | 1298840 | Upload Photo |
| Porters Yard | Church End, Great Dunmow | Hall House | 14th century | 20 February 1967 | TL6288522774; 51°52′47″N 0°21′54″E | 1121539 | Upload Photo |
| The Chestnuts | Great Dunmow | House | 18th century | 20 February 1967 | TL6269122014; 51°52′23″N 0°21′43″E | 1051609 | Upload Photo |
| White Horse Public House | Great Dunmow | Jettied House | Early 14th century | 24 March 1981 | TL6277221964; 51°52′21″N 0°21′47″E | 1122660 | Upload Photo |
| 20, 22 and 24 High Street | Great Dunmow | Hall House | Late 14th century | 16 February 1984 | TL6277721888; 51°52′19″N 0°21′47″E | 1359637 | Upload Photo |
| War Memorial | Great Dunmow | Cross | 1921 | 14 October 2016 | TL6282521809; 51°52′16″N 0°21′49″E | 1438524 | War Memorial More images |
| Bridgefoot | Great Easton | House | 16th century | 7 February 1952 | TL6038625328; 51°54′12″N 0°19′48″E | 1322576 | Upload Photo |
| Church of St John and St Giles | Great Easton | Church | Early 12th century | 20 February 1967 | TL6076025471; 51°54′17″N 0°20′08″E | 1112198 | Church of St John and St Giles More images |
| Elizabeth's Cottage | Great Easton | House | Later | 28 June 1983 | TL6037626893; 51°55′03″N 0°19′50″E | 1164926 | Upload Photo |
| Thatched Cottage | Little Cambridge, Great Easton | Hall House | 14th century | 28 June 1968 | TL6197827088; 51°55′08″N 0°21′14″E | 1317501 | Upload Photo |
| Church of St Giles | Great Hallingbury | Church | Late 11th century | 20 February 1967 | TL5113719600; 51°51′16″N 0°11′35″E | 1147293 | Church of St Giles More images |
| Barrington Hall | Hatfield Broad Oak | Country House | c. 1734 | 21 July 1975 | TL5497217645; 51°50′09″N 0°14′52″E | 1097470 | Barrington Hall More images |
| Forest Cottage | Wood Row, Hatfield Broad Oak | House | Extension | 8 August 1985 | TL5390418797; 51°50′48″N 0°13′58″E | 1186299 | Upload Photo |
| Oak Cottage | Broad St, Hatfield Broad Oak | House | C20 | 1 April 1982 | TL5497216439; 51°49′30″N 0°14′50″E | 1097482 | Oak Cottage More images |
| Old Court House | Hatfield Broad Oak | House | 1985 | 8 August 1985 | TL5456016567; 51°49′35″N 0°14′29″E | 1299266 | Old Court House More images |
| Ploughden | Bush End, Hatfield Broad Oak | House | 1985 | 8 August 1985 | TL5508519912; 51°51′23″N 0°15′02″E | 1186260 | Ploughden More images |
| Rundle House | Hatfield Broad Oak | House | Early 19th century | 20 February 1967 | TL5455116512; 51°49′33″N 0°14′28″E | 1120880 | Rundle House More images |
| Shell House | Hatfield Forest, Hatfield Broad Oak | Garden House | c. 1757 | 8 August 1985 | TL5402519810; 51°51′20″N 0°14′06″E | 1186279 | Shell House More images |
| Town Farmhouse including Wall enclosing Yard | Hatfield Broad Oak | Kitchen | Late 14th century or early 15th century | 7 February 1952 | TL5456716441; 51°49′31″N 0°14′29″E | 1120907 | Town Farmhouse including Wall enclosing Yard More images |
| Ware Pond Cottages | Hatfield Broad Oak | Farmhouse | Early 15th century | 8 August 1985 | TL5505516511; 51°49′33″N 0°14′55″E | 1334068 | Ware Pond Cottages More images |
| Down Hall | Hatfield Heath | Country House | 1871-3 | 14 December 1983 | TL5225513108; 51°47′45″N 0°12′23″E | 1186292 | Down Hall More images |
| Lea Hall | Hatfield Heath | House | Early 17th century | 7 February 1952 | TL5286215357; 51°48′57″N 0°12′58″E | 1334062 | Upload Photo |
| Church of St Andrew | Hempstead | Church | Mid 14th century by 1365 | 21 February 1967 | TL6350437996; 52°00′59″N 0°22′52″E | 1278485 | Church of St Andrew More images |
| Cock and Bell | High Easter | House | Later Alteration | 7 February 1952 | TL6206214773; 51°48′29″N 0°20′58″E | 1112509 | Cock and Bell More images |
| High Easterbury | High Easter | House | 14th century | 20 September 1985 | TL6196014668; 51°48′26″N 0°20′52″E | 1147300 | Upload Photo |
| Pentlow End | High Easter | Farmhouse | Late 16th century | 20 November 1975 | TL6212816234; 51°49′16″N 0°21′03″E | 1112504 | Upload Photo |
| Barn approximately 60 Metres South West of Moat at New Hall Farm | High Roding | Barn | 17th century | 7 February 1952 | TL5795516158; 51°49′18″N 0°17′26″E | 1328813 | Upload Photo |
| Parish Church of All Saints | High Roding | Parish Church | 13th century | 20 February 1967 | TL5918616523; 51°49′29″N 0°18′30″E | 1141272 | Parish Church of All Saints More images |
| Church of St John the Evangelist | Upper Green, Langley | Church | 12th century | 21 February 1967 | TL4425935258; 51°59′49″N 0°05′59″E | 1278241 | Church of St John the Evangelist More images |
| Parish Church of St Michael and All Angels | Leaden Roding | Parish Church | 11th century | 20 February 1967 | TL5899813248; 51°47′43″N 0°18′15″E | 1328803 | Parish Church of St Michael and All Angels More images |
| Church of St Mary the Virgin | Lindsell | Parish Church | 12th century | 20 February 1967 | TL6436727122; 51°55′06″N 0°23′19″E | 1112140 | Church of St Mary the Virgin More images |
| Barn at Little Canfield Hall (50 Metres South West) | Little Canfield | Timber Framed Barn | Late 14th century | 16 February 1984 | TL5850421887; 51°52′23″N 0°18′04″E | 1054762 | Upload Photo |
| Stone Hall | Little Canfield | House | 16th century | 16 February 1984 | TL5925222274; 51°52′35″N 0°18′43″E | 1334091 | Upload Photo |
| Church of St Mary the Virgin | Little Chesterford | Church | Early 13th century | 21 February 1967 | TL5151441717; 52°03′11″N 0°12′30″E | 1277390 | Church of St Mary the Virgin More images |
| Brick House | Little Dunmow | House | Late C16-early 17th century | 7 May 1952 | TL6552720624; 51°51′35″N 0°24′08″E | 1168301 | Upload Photo |
| Grange Farm Granary 60 Metres South of Farmhouse | Little Dunmow | Granary | 15th century or earlier | 20 February 1967 | TL6533821231; 51°51′55″N 0°24′00″E | 1251436 | Upload Photo |
| Easton Glebe | Little Easton | House | Mid 18th century | 20 February 1967 | TL6010323866; 51°53′25″N 0°19′31″E | 1334055 | Upload Photo |
| Church of St Mary the Virgin | Little Hallingbury | Church | 12th century | 20 February 1967 | TL5032617472; 51°50′08″N 0°10′49″E | 1112021 | Church of St Mary the Virgin More images |
| Gaston House | Gaston Green, Little Hallingbury | House | Late 18th century | 20 February 1967 | TL4987217215; 51°50′00″N 0°10′25″E | 1322661 | Gaston House More images |
| Hallingbury Mill | Little Hallingbury | Flour Mill | 1874 | 13 June 1983 | TL4957616922; 51°49′51″N 0°10′09″E | 1111991 | Hallingbury Mill More images |
| Tewes | Little Sampford | House | 16th century | 26 November 1951 | TL6405733925; 51°58′46″N 0°23′14″E | 1231857 | Upload Photo |
| Ring Temple | Audley End Park, Littlebury | Garden Building | 1763 | 21 February 1967 | TL5155938323; 52°01′21″N 0°12′27″E | 1231275 | Upload Photo |
| Church of St Mary the Virgin | Manuden | Church | 12th century | 21 February 1967 | TL4910426665; 51°55′07″N 0°10′00″E | 1233999 | Church of St Mary the Virgin More images |
| Clock House, North House, South House | Shortgrove, Newport | House | 1980 | 21 February 1967 | TL5267035326; 51°59′43″N 0°13′20″E | 1235092 | Upload Photo |
| Crown House | Newport | House | Late 17th century | 26 November 1951 | TL5216834557; 51°59′19″N 0°12′53″E | 1234043 | Crown House More images |
| Monk's Barn | Newport | House | Later | 26 November 1951 | TL5215933938; 51°58′59″N 0°12′51″E | 1234841 | Monk's Barn More images |
| Newport House | Newport | House | 18th century | 21 February 1967 | TL5212933940; 51°58′59″N 0°12′50″E | 1275835 | Upload Photo |
| Old Vicarage | Newport | Jettied House | Early 16th century | 21 February 1967 | TL5213833835; 51°58′56″N 0°12′50″E | 1234747 | Old Vicarage More images |
| The Georgians | Newport | House | 18th century | 21 February 1967 | TL5213233801; 51°58′55″N 0°12′50″E | 1275909 | Upload Photo |
| Tudor House | Newport | Farmhouse | 15th century | 26 November 1951 | TL5214834622; 51°59′21″N 0°12′52″E | 1276293 | Tudor House More images |
| Church of St Simon and St Jude | Quendon, Quendon and Rickling | Church | 13th century | 21 February 1967 | TL5154830664; 51°57′14″N 0°12′14″E | 1216675 | Church of St Simon and St Jude More images |
| Dovecote to West of Quendon Hall | Quendon Park, Quendon and Rickling | Dovecote | 17th century | 26 November 1951 | TL5145331861; 51°57′53″N 0°12′11″E | 1217182 | Upload Photo |
| Forecourt Walls and Gate Piers to South of Quendon Hall | Quendon Park, Quendon and Rickling | Gate Pier | 17th century | 21 February 1967 | TL5154031768; 51°57′49″N 0°12′15″E | 1216683 | Upload Photo |
| Quendon Court | Quendon, Quendon and Rickling | House | Medieval | 21 February 1967 | TL5139330238; 51°57′00″N 0°12′05″E | 1275800 | Quendon Court More images |
| Rickling Hall | Rickling, Quendon and Rickling | Hall | C14-C15 | 26 November 1951 | TL5003730302; 51°57′04″N 0°10′54″E | 1216666 | Rickling Hall More images |
| Church of St Mary the Virgin | The Village, Radwinter | Church | 14th century | 21 February 1967 | TL6063137275; 52°00′38″N 0°20′21″E | 1221254 | Church of St Mary the Virgin More images |
| The Old Vicarage | Radwinter | House | Modern | 26 November 1951 | TL6060837237; 52°00′37″N 0°20′19″E | 1221273 | The Old Vicarage More images |
| Ashcroft Court | Saffron Walden | House | c. 1800 | 28 November 1951 | TL5377838562; 52°01′27″N 0°14′24″E | 1196153 | Ashcroft Court More images |
| Barclays Bank | Saffron Walden | Steps | 1874 | 1 November 1972 | TL5389738544; 52°01′26″N 0°14′30″E | 1297732 | Barclays Bank More images |
| Bridge House the Corner House | Saffron Walden | House | Early 16th century | 28 November 1951 | TL5354538653; 52°01′30″N 0°14′11″E | 1204544 | Bridge House the Corner House More images |
| Burntwood End | Little Walden, Saffron Walden | House | 19th century | 1 November 1972 | TL5414242878; 52°03′46″N 0°14′50″E | 1196099 | Upload Photo |
| Commemorative Column north east of Audley End House | Audley End, Saffron Walden | Column | 1774 | 28 November 1951 | TL5267138944; 52°01′40″N 0°13′26″E | 1196117 | Upload Photo |
| Lion Gate | Audley End, Saffron Walden | Gate | 1616 | 1 November 1972 | TL5233238023; 52°01′11″N 0°13′07″E | 1204373 | Lion Gate More images |
| Temple east of Audley End House | Audley End, Saffron Walden | Temple | 1790 | 1 November 1972 | TL5280038100; 52°01′13″N 0°13′32″E | 1196116 | Temple east of Audley End House More images |
| South Boundary Wall to Park | Audley End, Saffron Walden | Gate | Early 17th century | 28 November 1951 | TL5299237926; 52°01′07″N 0°13′41″E | 1204384 | South Boundary Wall to Park |
| 1–7 Village Street | Audley End, Saffron Walden | House | Later alterations | 28 November 1951 | TL5248537947; 52°01′08″N 0°13′15″E | 1196244 | Upload Photo |
| 2–28, Village Street | Audley End, Saffron Walden | House | 17th century | 28 November 1951 | TL5246937942; 52°01′08″N 0°13′14″E | 1196245 | 2–28, Village Street More images |
| Cromwell House | 23, Church St, Saffron Walden | House | 16th century | 28 November 1951 | TL5378838566; 52°01′27″N 0°14′24″E | 1196154 | Cromwell House More images |
| Cross Keys Hotel | Saffron Walden | House | 16th century | 28 November 1951 | TL5373338455; 52°01′24″N 0°14′21″E | 1196188 | Cross Keys Hotel More images |
| Eight Bells Inn | Saffron Walden | Inn | Early 15th century | 28 November 1951 | TL5355538680; 52°01′31″N 0°14′12″E | 1196128 | Eight Bells Inn More images |
| Jubilee House | Saffron Walden | House | c. 1720 | 28 November 1951 | TL5387838426; 52°01′22″N 0°14′29″E | 1196204 | Jubilee House More images |
| Sparrows Charity | Saffron Walden | House | Late 16th century | 28 November 1951 | TL5373638535; 52°01′26″N 0°14′21″E | 1205520 | Sparrows Charity More images |
| The Priory | Saffron Walden | House | c. 1600 | 28 November 1951 | TL5396438562; 52°01′27″N 0°14′33″E | 1297783 | The Priory More images |
| No 21, High Street | Saffron Walden | Apartment | 17th century | 29 August 1969 | TL5367738497; 52°01′25″N 0°14′18″E | 1196187 | No 21, High Street |
| No 53, High St and attached Walls | Saffron Walden | House | Medieval | 28 November 1951 | TL5371938363; 52°01′21″N 0°14′20″E | 1206038 | No 53, High St and attached Walls More images |
| 5 and 7, Bridge Street | Saffron Walden | House | Late 17th century | 28 November 1951 | TL5356438630; 52°01′29″N 0°14′12″E | 1204528 | 5 and 7, Bridge Street More images |
| 24 and 26, Bridge Street | Saffron Walden | House | Mid 16th century | 28 November 1951 | TL5351338719; 52°01′32″N 0°14′10″E | 1204567 | 24 and 26, Bridge Street More images |
| 27 and 29, Bridge Street | Saffron Walden | House | 16th century | 28 November 1951 | TL5352038679; 52°01′31″N 0°14′10″E | 1297807 | 27 and 29, Bridge Street More images |
| 31, Bridge Street | Saffron Walden | House | Late 16th century | 28 November 1951 | TL5351938688; 52°01′31″N 0°14′10″E | 1196126 | 31, Bridge Street More images |
| 33, Bridge Street | Saffron Walden | House | 17th century | 28 November 1951 | TL5351438683; 52°01′31″N 0°14′10″E | 1297768 | Upload Photo |
| 41 and 43 Castle Street | Saffron Walden | House | 19th century | 28 November 1951 | TL5369738692; 52°01′31″N 0°14′20″E | 1280720 | 41 and 43 Castle Street More images |
| 45 and 47, Castle Street | Saffron Walden | House | Later alterations | 28 November 1951 | TL5370438693; 52°01′31″N 0°14′20″E | 1205408 | 45 and 47, Castle Street More images |
| 49 and 51, Castle Street | Saffron Walden | House | 15th and 17th-century | 28 November 1951 | TL5371138698; 52°01′31″N 0°14′20″E | 1205418 | 49 and 51, Castle Street More images |
| 1, Freshwell Street | Saffron Walden | House | 19th century | 28 November 1951 | TL5355538642; 52°01′30″N 0°14′12″E | 1297749 | 1, Freshwell Street More images |
| 11, 13 and 15, Museum Street | Saffron Walden | House | 19th century | 28 November 1951 | TL5377838683; 52°01′31″N 0°14′24″E | 1298578 | 11, 13 and 15, Museum Street More images |
| 17, 19 and 21, King Street | Saffron Walden | House | Early 16th century | 28 November 1951 | TL5379238457; 52°01′24″N 0°14′24″E | 1206346 | 17, 19 and 21, King Street More images |
| 13a and 15, King Street | Saffron Walden | House | c. 1800 | 28 November 1951 | TL5382038473; 52°01′24″N 0°14′26″E | 1196208 | 13a and 15, King Street More images |
| 4, Market Hill | Saffron Walden | House | c. 1800 | 28 November 1951 | TL5384938559; 52°01′27″N 0°14′27″E | 1206460 | 4, Market Hill More images |
| 12 and 14, Market Hill | Saffron Walden | House | Mid 16th century | 28 November 1951 | TL5383038589; 52°01′28″N 0°14′26″E | 1196216 | 12 and 14, Market Hill More images |
| Church of St Mary the Virgin | Stansted Mountfitchet | Church | 1120-1124 | 21 February 1967 | TL5210724174; 51°53′43″N 0°12′33″E | 1238498 | Church of St Mary the Virgin More images |
| Stansted Mountfitchet Windmill | Stansted Mountfitchet | Tower Mill | 1787 | 26 November 1951 | TL5097624740; 51°54′03″N 0°11′35″E | 1221435 | Stansted Mountfitchet Windmill More images |
| Parsonage Farmhouse | Stebbing | Kitchen | Late 15th century | 7 February 1952 | TL6626023888; 51°53′20″N 0°24′52″E | 1322281 | Parsonage Farmhouse More images |
| Porters Hall | Stebbing | House | Earlier | 7 February 1952 | TL6775723668; 51°53′11″N 0°26′10″E | 1322338 | Porters Hall More images |
| Stebbing Memorial Club | Stebbing | Public Library | c. 1674 | 20 February 1967 | TL6620924152; 51°53′28″N 0°24′50″E | 1168695 | Upload Photo |
| Stebbing Mill | Stebbing | Feed Mill | 18th century | 20 February 1967 | TL6586024063; 51°53′26″N 0°24′32″E | 1322337 | Upload Photo |
| Stebbing Park | Stebbing Park, Stebbing | House | Later | 7 May 1952 | TL6574224433; 51°53′38″N 0°24′26″E | 1306764 | Upload Photo |
| Tan Farmhouse | Stebbing | Farmhouse | 15th century | 7 February 1952 | TL6599124122; 51°53′27″N 0°24′39″E | 1112728 | Upload Photo |
| Chestnuts | Takeley | House | 19th century | 10 September 1981 | TL5574421309; 51°52′07″N 0°15′39″E | 1322589 | Chestnuts More images |
| Josephes | Takeley | House | Modern | 10 September 1981 | TL5453421290; 51°52′08″N 0°14′35″E | 1169005 | Josephes More images |
| Moat Cottage | Smith's Green, Takeley | Timber Framed House | Mid 16th century | 20 February 1967 | TL5658521308; 51°52′06″N 0°16′22″E | 1112211 | Upload Photo |
| Sheering Hall | Bambers Green, Takeley | House | 18th century | 10 September 1981 | TL5756422889; 51°52′56″N 0°17′16″E | 1306827 | Upload Photo |
| Borough Farmhouse | Thaxted | Farmhouse | Late 14th century | 20 February 1967 | TL6070430785; 51°57′08″N 0°20′14″E | 1112972 | Borough Farmhouse More images |
| Goddards Farmhouse | Boyton End, Thaxted | Farmhouse | Late 16th century | 7 February 1952 | TL6124032435; 51°58′01″N 0°20′44″E | 1165505 | Upload Photo |
| Park Farmhouse | Thaxted | House | 17th century | 7 February 1952 | TL6116630692; 51°57′05″N 0°20′38″E | 1112927 | Park Farmhouse More images |
| Prouds Farmhouse | Thaxted | Farmhouse | 14th century | 7 February 1952 | TL6044532663; 51°58′09″N 0°20′03″E | 1112152 | Upload Photo |
| Recorder's House | 17, Town St, Thaxted | Jettied House | Mid 15th century | 7 February 1952 | TL6118130911; 51°57′12″N 0°20′39″E | 1112902 | Recorder's House More images |
| The Manse | 19, Town St, Thaxted | House | Early 19th century | 20 February 1967 | TL6117530914; 51°57′12″N 0°20′38″E | 1322261 | The Manse More images |
| The Priory | 38, Town St, Thaxted | House | 18th century | 20 February 1967 | TL6114630987; 51°57′14″N 0°20′37″E | 1112944 | Upload Photo |
| Town House | 25, Town St, Thaxted | House | late 15th century or early 16th century | 20 February 1967 | TL6114330934; 51°57′13″N 0°20′37″E | 1112904 | Town House More images |
| John Webb's Windmill | Thaxted | Tower Mill | 1804 | 7 February 1952 | TL6096630818; 51°57′09″N 0°20′27″E | 1112153 | John Webb's Windmill More images |
| 16 Watling Street | Thaxted | House | 18th century | 20 February 1967 | TL6110031049; 51°57′17″N 0°20′35″E | 1166190 | 16 Watling Street More images |
| 1, Stoney Lane | Thaxted | House | 14th century with 18th century alterations | 20 February 1967 | TL6113330956; 51°57′14″N 0°20′36″E | 1112933 | 1, Stoney Lane |
| Tilty Mill | Tilty | Watermill | Early 18th century | 10 September 1981 | TL5994426734; 51°54′58″N 0°19′27″E | 1112221 | Tilty Mill More images |
| Church of St Peter | Ugley | Church | 13th century | 21 February 1967 | TL5196128755; 51°56′12″N 0°12′33″E | 1275055 | Church of St Peter More images |
| Orford House | Ugley | House | c. 1700 | 21 February 1967 | TL5147627081; 51°55′18″N 0°12′05″E | 1221630 | Orford House More images |
| Dovecote at Hall Farm, Lofts Hall | Lofts Hall, Wenden Lofts | Dovecote | 16th century | 21 February 1967 | TL4644438721; 52°01′39″N 0°07′59″E | 1238148 | Upload Photo |
| Barn to North of Colville Hall | White Roding | Barn | 15th century Or early 16th century | 13 June 1983 | TL5535613456; 51°47′53″N 0°15′06″E | 1308419 | Upload Photo |
| Byre to West of Colville Hall | White Roding | Cow House | LATE 14th century or Early 15th century | 13 June 1983 | TL5533013416; 51°47′52″N 0°15′04″E | 1112004 | Upload Photo |
| Cammas Hall | White Roding | Hall | Late 16th century | 7 February 1952 | TL5653615302; 51°48′52″N 0°16′10″E | 1111989 | Upload Photo |
| Church of St Martin | White Roding | Church | 11th century | 20 February 1967 | TL5617513351; 51°47′49″N 0°15′48″E | 1322680 | Church of St Martin More images |
| Colville Hall | White Roding | House | Later | 7 February 1952 | TL5536713420; 51°47′52″N 0°15′06″E | 1112003 | Upload Photo |
| Gateway at Colville Hall | White Roding | Gate | Early 16th century | 7 February 1952 | TL5541313373; 51°47′51″N 0°15′08″E | 1147664 | Upload Photo |
| Granary to North West of Colville Hall | White Roding | Granary | 15th century | 13 June 1983 | TL5536813447; 51°47′53″N 0°15′06″E | 1112005 | Upload Photo |
| Lower Barn North East of Colville Hall | White Roding | Barn | 1630 | 13 June 1983 | TL5534113479; 51°47′54″N 0°15′05″E | 1322692 | Upload Photo |
| Lucas Farm House | White Roding | Farmhouse | Early and mid 16th century | 13 June 1983 | TL5765813787; 51°48′02″N 0°17′06″E | 1322653 | Lucas Farm House More images |
| Brick House | Wicken Bonhunt | House | c. 1600 | 26 November 1951 | TL4973233102; 51°58′34″N 0°10′43″E | 1238316 | Upload Photo |
| Church of St Margaret | Wicken Bonhunt | Church | 13th century | 21 February 1967 | TL4988733346; 51°58′42″N 0°10′51″E | 1238314 | Church of St Margaret More images |
| Church of St Mary the Virgin | Widdington | Church | 12th century | 21 February 1967 | TL5397231779; 51°57′47″N 0°14′23″E | 1238372 | Church of St Mary the Virgin More images |
| Thistley Hall | Widdington | House | c. 1670 | 26 November 1951 | TL5563731090; 51°57′23″N 0°15′49″E | 1112403 | Thistley Hall More images |
| Broadoaks Farmhouse | Wimbish | Farmhouse | 1980 | 26 November 1951 | TL5899133570; 51°58′40″N 0°18′49″E | 1238676 | Broadoaks Farmhouse More images |
| Operations Block, Carver Barracks (former RAF Debden) | Caversfield, Wimbish | Barracks | 1938 | 1 December 2005 | TL5686234523; 51°59′13″N 0°16′59″E | 1392874 | Operations Block, Carver Barracks (former RAF Debden) |
