= Desolation =

Desolation or desolate may refer to:

- Loneliness, an unpleasant emotional response to perceived isolation

== Geography ==
- Cape Desolation, a headland in southwest Greenland
- Desolate Branch, a stream in West Virginia
- Desolation Canyon, a canyon in Utah
- Desolation Island (disambiguation)
- Desolation Lava Field, a lava field in British Columbia
- Desolation Peak (Washington)
- Desolation Peak (Wyoming)
- Desolation Sound, a sound in British Columbia
- Desolation Wilderness, a protected area in California

== Music ==
- Desolate (album), a 1995 album by Alien Faktor
- Desolate (EP), a 2011 EP by Set The Sun
- "Desolation", song by Granville Bantock from Songs from the Chinese Poets
- "Desolation", song by Imminence from The Black
- "Desolation", song by Lamb of God from Resolution
- "Desolation", song by Red Harvest from Sick Transit Gloria Mundi
- "Desolation", song by Tremonti from A Dying Machine

== Other ==
- Desolation (2017 film), an American horror film
- Desolation (2018 film), an American thriller film
- Desolate (film), a 2018 American thriller film
- Desolation (Llimona), a sculpture by Josep Llimona
- Desolate (video game), a 2019 video game
- Spiritual dryness, a concept in Catholic spirituality also known as desolation
