= John Judd (disambiguation) =

John Judd (born 1942) is an English engineer.

John Judd may also refer to:

- John Judd (cricketer) (1810–1888), English cricketer
- John W. Judd (1839–1919), Justice of the Supreme Court of the Utah Territory
- John Wesley Judd (1840–1916), British geologist
