= Chapel of St Helen =

Coordinates: 51.9794°N 0.1993°E

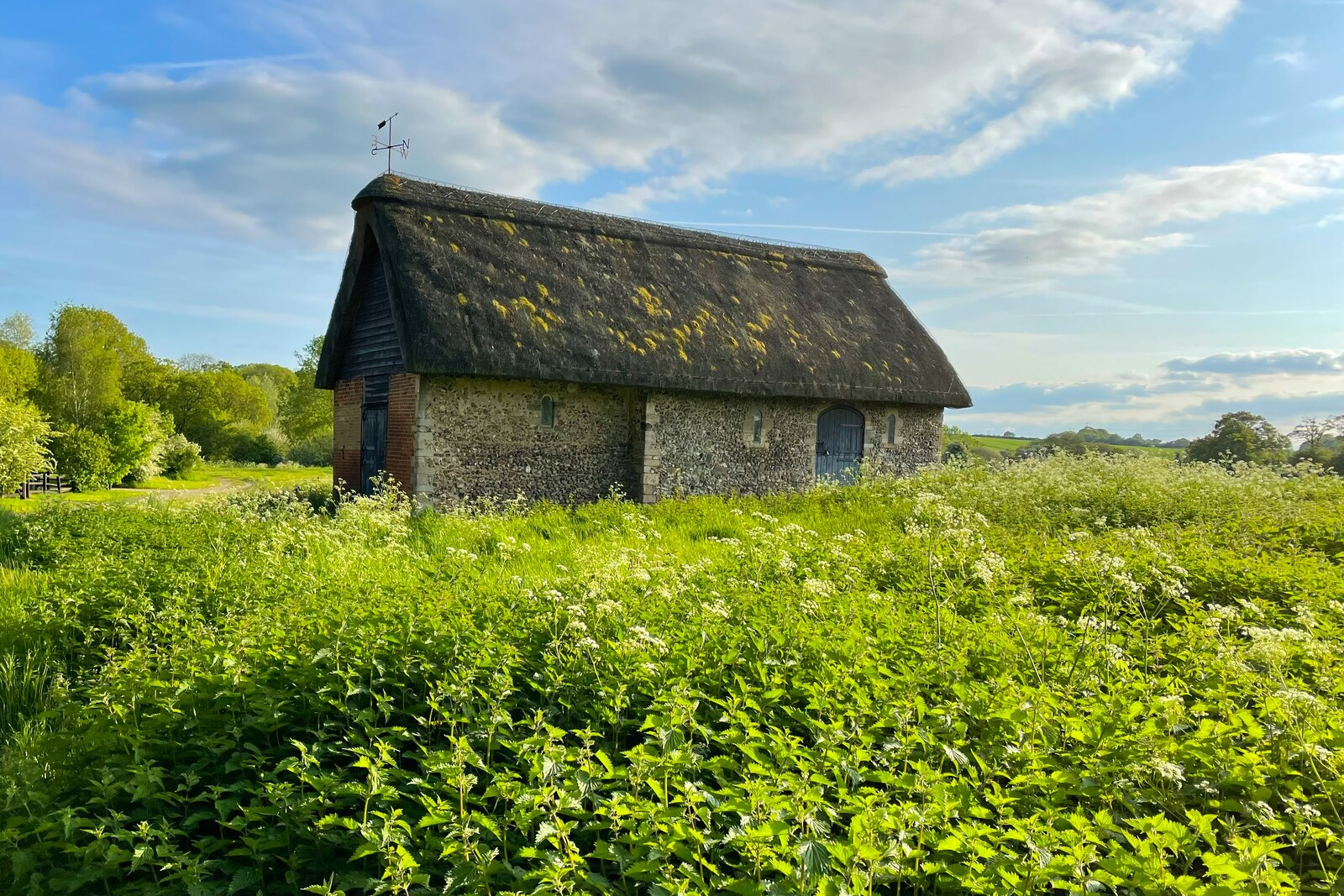
- Chapel of St Helen in 2023

- Location in Essex
- OS grid reference: TL 5114 3349
- Location: Wicken Bonhunt, Essex
- Country: England
- Denomination: Church of England, Diocese of Chelmsford
- Website: www.chelmsford.anglican.org

History
- Status: Chapel

Architecture
- Functional status: Annual service
- Heritage designation: Grade II
- Designated: 26 November 1951

Specifications
- Materials: Flint and pebble with stone quoins, thatched roof

Chapel of St Helen (also St Helen's Chapel) is an ancient religious building in Wicken Bonhunt, north-west Essex. It dates from around the 11th century and is believed to be one of the oldest surviving buildings in the east of England. It has also been described as 10th century.

Pevsner's Essex architecture guide of 1954 describes it as: "A complete Norman chapel of nave and chancel with a number of original windows".

The chapel is at Bonhunt Farm, on the B1038 (Newport to Buntingford) road and close to a motorway flyover for the M11.

== Design ==
The Grade II listed, thatched chapel is built from flint and pebble and contains two 12th-century windows on the south and west walls. It was extensively restored in the 13th century and again in the 20th.

It is 37.5 feet (11 m) long and less than 15 feet (5 m) across at its widest point, with the nave being considerably narrower.

== History ==
Surviving records of the chapel's history list the names of three of its priests, including Miles in 1248. In 1340, there is a record that land was given to the nearby Hospital of St Mary and St Leonard in Newport to pay for a priest to hold a daily service at the chapel. The chapel was dissolved in 1543 and left vacant.

History has not always been kind to the chapel. The RCHM's 1916 survey, An Inventory of the Historical Monuments in Essex, records it as desecrated and in use as a stable, although it does describe its condition as fairly good.

Extensive restoration took place around 1918, presided over by the then owner of Bonhunt Farm, and architectural features were carefully preserved. By the 1930s, it was once again being used as a shed.

== Associated archaeological finds ==
A major middle Saxon settlement found near the chapel in 1967 was excavated in the early 1970s, during construction of the M11. It showed signs of prehistoric (described as "presumed late Bronze Age" in a British Museum report), as well as Norman, activity and included a burial ground around Chapel of St Helen containing over 200 human remains. The Saxon settlement is considered to be associated with the chapel.

== Current status ==
The chapel is now maintained, and is part of the Diocese of Chelmsford. An annual service is held at the chapel, led by a team of volunteers from Wicken Bonhunt. Although the chapel is only usually open for the annual service, the exterior can be seen from the roadside and a public footpath passes nearby.

== External sources ==
- Archaeology collections at Saffron Walden Museum
- Artists' impression of the middle Saxon site near Chapel of St Helen
- Description of walk taking in Chapel of St Helen

Media related to Chapel of St Helen, Wicken Bonhunt at Wikimedia Commons
