= Justice Judd =

Justice Judd may refer to:

- Albert Francis Judd (1838–1900), chief justice of the Hawaii Supreme Court
- John W. Judd (1839–1919), associate justice of the Utah Supreme Court
