= Barclay's Bank Building =

Barclay's Bank Building may refer to:

== In England ==
- Barclays Bank, Enfield
- Barclays Bank, Saffron Walden
- Barclays Bank building, Sutton
- Barclays Bank, York

== Elsewhere ==
- Barclay's Bank Building (Los Angeles), California, United States
