= John Judd (cricketer) =

English cricketer

John Phillipps Judd (8 June 1810 – 9 April 1888) was an English cricketer with amateur status who was active in 1831. He was born in Birchanger, Essex and died in Rickling, Essex. He made his debut in 1831 and appeared in one match as an unknown handedness batsman whose bowling style is unknown, playing for Cambridge University. He scored eighteen runs with a highest score of 9 and took no wickets. He was educated at Eton and Trinity College, Cambridge.

== Bibliography ==
- Haygarth, Arthur (1996) [1862]. Scores & Biographies, Volume 1 (1744–1826). Kennington: Frederick Lillywhite. ISBN 978-19-00592-23-9.
- Haygarth, Arthur (1997) [1862]. Scores & Biographies, Volume 2 (1827–1840). Kennington: Frederick Lillywhite. ISBN 978-19-00592-23-9.
