= Quendon Hall =

Historic building in Essex

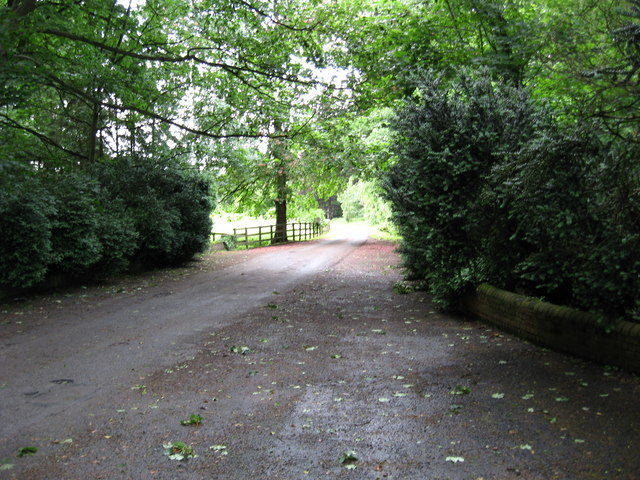
- Driveway leading through the woods to Quendon Hall
- Interactive map of the Quendon Hall area

General information
- Location: Quendon, Essex, England
- Coordinates: 51.9643°N 0.2043°E
- Owner: The Tabor Group

Website
- https://www.quendonhall.co.uk/

Listed Building – Grade I
- Official name: Quendon Hall
- Designated: 26 November 1951; 74 years ago
- Reference no.: 1217140

Quendon Hall is a historic manor house located in the village of Quendon, Essex, England. The name "Quendon" derives from the Old English words *cwena* (queen or woman) and *denu* (valley), meaning "valley owned by a queen or woman." This may refer to Ricula, wife of King Sledd of Essex, who is associated with the adjacent parish of Quendon and Rickling.

== History ==
=== Early Ownership ===
In 1520, Thomas Newman acquired the property and built the original hall. Later, in the 17th century, John Turner, Esq., rebuilt the house and enclosed the park. The estate subsequently passed to Henry Cranmer in 1741, from whom it descended to James Powell Cranmer. Other notable residents included William Foot Mitchell, MP, and Launcelot Cranmer-Byng.

=== Architectural Evolution ===
Originally named "Newman Hall," the house was constructed as a timber-framed, gabled structure in the mid-16th century. It was remodeled in brick by Thomas Turner around 1670–1680, when it was renamed Quendon Hall. Turner also established the park's iconic north and south avenues.

In the 18th and 19th centuries, the Cranmer family enlarged the park and added a beamed dining room. Sir William Foot Mitchell, who purchased the estate in 1907, updated the gardens and added a new wing.

Following a fire in 1956, Sir Robert Adeane purchased the estate. In 1969, the third Earl of Inchcape remodeled the interior, added a dry moat, and re-routed the south drive.

=== Modern usage ===
The property is now under corporate ownership, run as Parklands Quendon, hosting both weddings and corporate events.

== Description ==
=== Location and Setting ===
Quendon Hall is situated approximately 8 km north of Bishop's Stortford, at the northern edge of Quendon village. The estate spans approximately 60 hectares, bordered by farmland and the village to the south. The M11 motorway intersects the estate's eastern boundary.

=== Principal Building ===
The Grade I-listed mansion is a two-storey red-brick building with stucco bands and a tiled roof. The irregular west entrance front features an early 20th-century Doric-columned porch. Originally timber-framed, the house was remodeled in brick during the late 17th century. Notable additions include a 20th-century south-west wing and interior modifications following the mid-20th-century fire.

=== Gardens and Parkland ===
The estate features formal gardens to the south, east, and north of the Hall, including a gravel terrace, box-hedged lawns, and remnants of a 17th-century moat. The parkland is characterized by mature trees, including oaks and horse chestnuts, and retains elements of 17th-century design, such as the north avenue.

=== Notable Features ===
- Walled Garden — situated north-east of the Hall, this area includes a swimming pool and tennis court. Historically, it served as a kitchen garden and bowling green.
- Outbuildings — these include a Grade II-listed 17th-century barn, a Grade II*-listed octagonal dovecote, and late 20th-century stable buildings.
