= Thomas Duke =

British photographer, influencer, and interviewer

- Born: Newport, Essex
- Education: Brunel University
- Occupations: Influencer, photographer, interviewer

Thomas Duke is a British photographer, influencer, and interviewer best known for his social media channel Stepping Through Film, in which he photographs locations of films. He is also a frequent interviewer of actors and directors.

== Biography ==
Duke hails from Newport, Essex. From a young age, he was a cinephile, and he attended Brunel University studying film. During college, he began traveling to find interesting places. During this time, he began taking photos of the locations his favorite films were filmed at, starting at a waterfall which part of Into the Woods was filmed at. In 2017, at age 18, he began creating social media content featuring these photos under Stepping Through Film. Much of this content includes him printing out stills from films and holding it up in front of the actual location to form a complete picture.

He soon began making that his full-time career, traveling the world to find filming locations ranging from The Devil Wears Prada in New York City to The Twilight Saga: New Moon in Montepulciano, Spider-Man: Brand New Day in Glasgow, and Forrest Gump in South Carolina, which he was hired to do by the South Carolina Tourism Board. He also began tracking down locations of animated films, including The Little Mermaid, Ratatouille, and Luca, the latter of which required "walking around finding similar aspects" until he found the spot. Some of his posts have been confirmed to be the location by the animators involved. He continued creating this content during the COVID-19 pandemic, although he had to get "more creative". In 2020, he had more than 100,000 combined followers. In 2023, he had more than 400,000 combined followers.

He is also known for his interviews of directors and actors, with Variety describing him as "the darling of the U.K.'s junket circuit" and his questions as "thoughtful and insightful". He always brings his photos to these interviews, as well as his film journal. He has stated due to his independence from publications and news, he's "been able to bring a bit of myself in there".

He has been hired to promote for companies including Sony, ITV, Prime Video, Apple TV, Redbreast Whiskey, and Netflix.

He has stated that he believes his most influential posts have to do with his own connection with his favorite films, such as how Love, Simon helped him come out as gay.

He was named to the 2026 TikTok Discover List.

His first book, A Film Lover's Guide to London, a photographic map to where shows and films were made, will be published by Sphere Books. It is set to release in 2026 with a foreword written by Alice Oseman.
