= Launcelot Cranmer-Byng =

British author and sinologist (1872–1945)

Launcelot Alfred Cranmer-Byng (23 November 1872 – 15 January 1945) was an author and sinologist. He was a member of the Byng baronets family, landowners in Essex.

His father was Lt. Col. Alfred Molyneaux Cranmer-Byng and his mother was Caroline Mary Tufnell. His brother Hugh Edward Cranmer-Byng (1873–1949) was also an author and playwright. Both brothers were brought up at Quendon Hall in Newport, Essex. Launcelot was educated at Wellington College and Trinity College, Cambridge. From around 1912, the two brothers were associated with the 'Warwick Circle' at Easton Lodge, whose other members included H. G. Wells, Ramsay MacDonald and the folk song collector Cecil Sharp. Cranmer-Byng served in World War I as a captain.

He is best known for his translations of Chinese poetry into English, such as The Never Ending Wrong (1902), The Odes of Confucius (1908) and Lute of Jade: Selections from the Classical Poets of China (1909). Salma (1923), was a play in three acts with a Persian setting, produced in Birmingham. A Feast of Lanterns (1936), published as part of John Murray's long-running Wisdom of the East series, of which he was a founder and editor, is a later anthology of ancient Chinese poetry, introduced and translated by Cranmer-Byng.

His first wife died in 1913 and he married Daisy Elaine Beach in 1916. There was one son, John Launcelot Cranmer-Byng (1919–1999). They lived at Horham Hall and at Foley Mill, Thaxted in Essex. In his later life Cranmer-Byng served as a long-term county Alderman and Justice of the peace. He died at Great Easton, near Dunmow, at the age of 72.

== Musical settings ==
His translations were set to music by composers including Granville Bantock (Songs from the Chinese Poets), Rebecca Clarke, Bernard van Dieren, Harry Farjeon (The Lute of Jade song cycle, 1917), Charles Tomlinson Griffes (Five Poems of Ancient China and Japan, 1917), Peter Warlock ('Along the Stream' from Saudades, 1923) and Emerson Whithorne (Two Chinese Nocturnes, 1921).
