= Quendon and Rickling =

Civil parish in Essex, England

Coordinates: 51.951°N 0.201°E

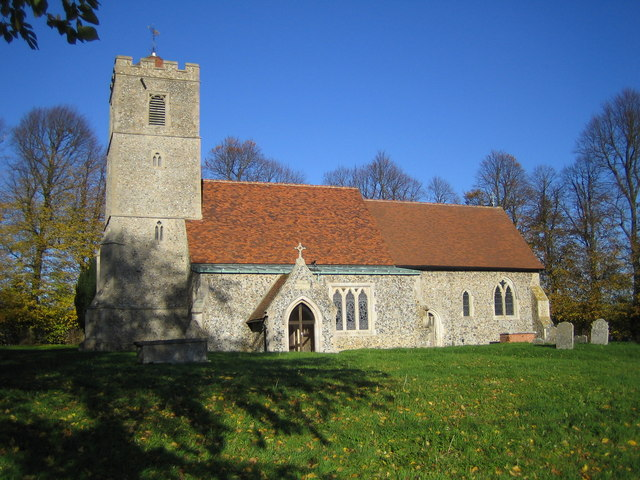
- All Saints' Church at Rickling

- Location within Essex
- Population: 694 (Parish, 2021); 423 (Rickling Green and Quendon built up area, 2021)
- Civil parish: Quendon and Rickling
- District: Uttlesford
- Shire county: Essex
- Region: East
- Country: England
- Sovereign state: United Kingdom
- Post town: SAFFRON WALDEN
- Postcode district: CB11

Quendon and Rickling is a civil parish in the Uttlesford district of Essex, England. The parish was formed in 1949 as a merger of the two former parishes of Rickling and Quendon. The villages of Rickling Green and Quendon have now merged into a single built up area. At the 2021 census the population of the parish was 694 and the population of the Rickling Green and Quendon built up area as defined by the Office for National Statistics was 423.

== Geography ==
Quendon is a linear settlement on the B1383 (formerly the A11 trunk road) between Saffron Walden and Bishop's Stortford. At its south-western end, Quendon adjoins Rickling Green, which was the main population centre of the old Rickling parish. The small settlement of Rickling itself, also known as Church End, comprises just the parish church, Church End Farm, and a couple of houses, and lies 1 mile (1.6 km) north-west of Rickling Green. Quendon and Rickling stand 95 metres (312 ft) above sea level, on a watershed between two river basins: the Cam to the east, flowing north through Cambridge, and the Stort to the west, flowing south through Bishop's Stortford.

== History ==
Palaeolithic and Neolithic remains have been found in the area. By the time of the Norman Conquest, both Quendon and Rickling were established as manors. In the Domesday Book of 1086, Quendon was listed as "Kuenadanam", and Rickling was listed as "Richelinga".

The name Quendon derives from the Old English cwene and den which means the "women's valley". Rickling derives from an Old English woman's name Ricola or Ricula, with the "ing" suffix indicating 'descendants' or 'followers', so meaning "the place of the people of Ricula". It has been speculated that the Ricula in question may have been the sister of Æthelberht of Kent and wife of Sledd, King of Essex (reigned c. 587 to 604). A direct link to that Ricula has not been proven, and it is possible that the village name may have come from a different Ricula.

The manors of Quendon and Rickling each became parishes. Rickling's parish church, dedicated to All Saints, dates back to the 13th century, but may have replaced an earlier Saxon church. Quendon's parish church, dedicated to St Simon and St Jude, also dates back to the 13th century.

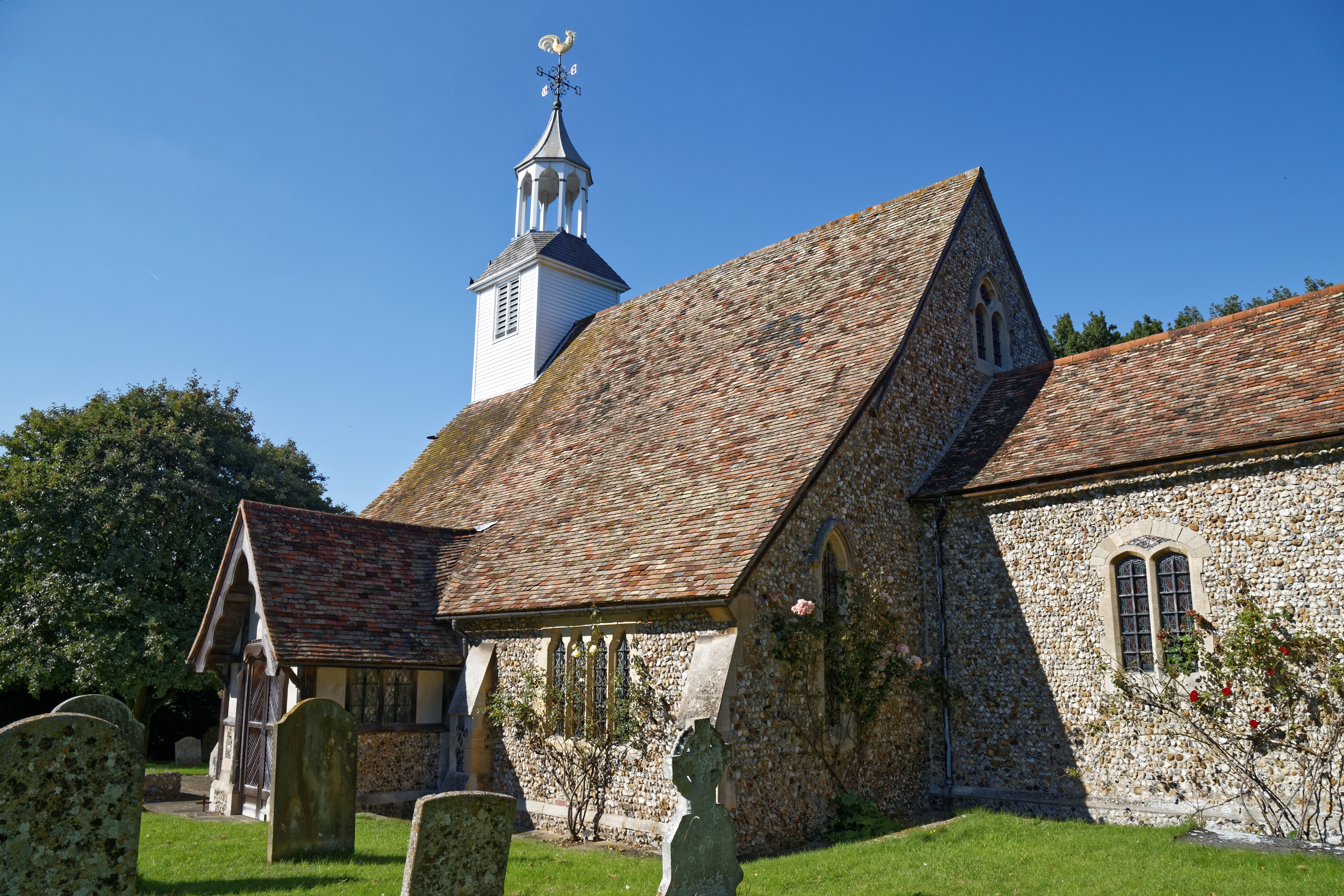
Church of St Simon and St Jude at Quendon

For much of its length, the parish boundary between Quendon and Rickling followed the main road, later the A11 and now the B1383. As such, properties in Quendon village but on the west side of the road were actually in Rickling parish. The main settlement in Rickling parish came to be Rickling Green, a short distance to the west of the main road and immediately south-west of Quendon village. Rickling Hall to the west of Rickling Green is a 14th century manor house on the site of an earlier castle. Quendon Hall to the north of Quendon is a large house dating back to the 16th century set in an extensive park of nearly 100 acres (40 hectares).

In 1949 the parishes were merged into a new civil parish called Quendon and Rickling. In ecclesiastical terms, the two parishes had formed a single benefice since 1934, with one priest serving both parishes. In 2012 the two ecclesiastical parishes were formally merged to match the civil parish.

A conservation area was designated in 1977 covering much of the built up area around Quendon and Rickling Green, which contains several listed buildings.

== See also ==
- The Hundred Parishes
