= Quendon =

Village in Essex, England

Coordinates: 51.95239°N 0.20169°E

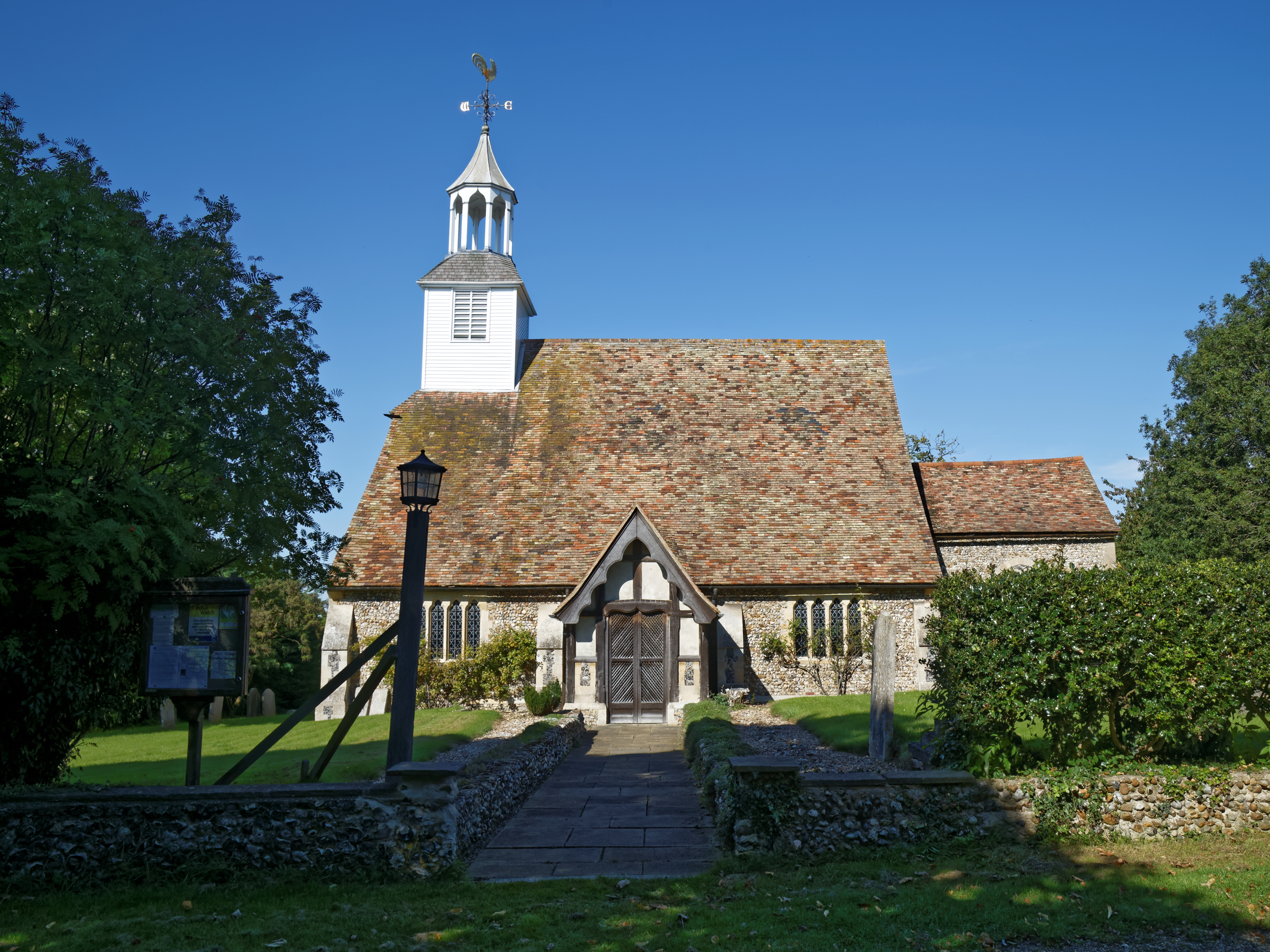
- Church of St Simon and St Jude, Quendon

- Location within Essex
- OS grid reference: TL514305
- Civil parish: Quendon and Rickling
- District: Uttlesford
- Shire county: Essex
- Region: East
- Country: England
- Sovereign state: United Kingdom
- Post town: Saffron Walden
- Postcode district: CB11
- Dialling code: 01799
- Police: Essex
- Fire: Essex
- Ambulance: East of England
- UK Parliament: Saffron Walden

Quendon is a linear village in the civil parish of Quendon and Rickling, in the Uttlesford district of Essex, England. Quendon is located on the B1383 (formerly the A11 trunk road) between Saffron Walden and Bishop's Stortford. The trunk road status was lost due to the opening of the parallel M11 motorway. The village now forms a single bult up area with the adjoining Rickling Green.

== History ==
The name of Quendon derives from the Old English cwena (queen, or woman) and denu (a valley), meaning the valley owned by a queen, or a woman; the queen referred to may be Ricula, wife of King Sledd of Essex, who gave her name to Rickling, the adjacent parish. The history of Quendon is closely associated with its close neighbour, Rickling village.

Quendon is mentioned in the Domesday Book, with 10 households populated by 3 villagers, 4 smallholders and 3 slaves.

Historically Quendon and Rickling were separated by some distance, with the main centre of Rickling village being around its parish church of All Saints. For reasons that are unclear, perhaps due to the heavy loss of life during the 14th Century by the Black Death or a significant fire in the old wooden buildings of the day, the main settlement in Rickling parish came to be Rickling Green, immediately south-west of Quendon village.

Rickling Green and Quendon village now form a single built up area. The historic "Coffin Path" bridleway was used for the parish residents of Rickling to travel to its own church some distance over the fields. The manor of Quendon became the property of Thomas Newman in 1520, who built Quendon Hall, which was re-built in the 17th century by John Turner, who enclosed the park. It was sold during the 19th century to Henry Cranmer, from whom it descended to James Powell Cranmer. Other residents of the hall included William Foot Mitchell, MP and Launcelot Cranmer-Byng.

Quendon's parish church, dedicated to St Simon and St Jude, is a small tiled building.

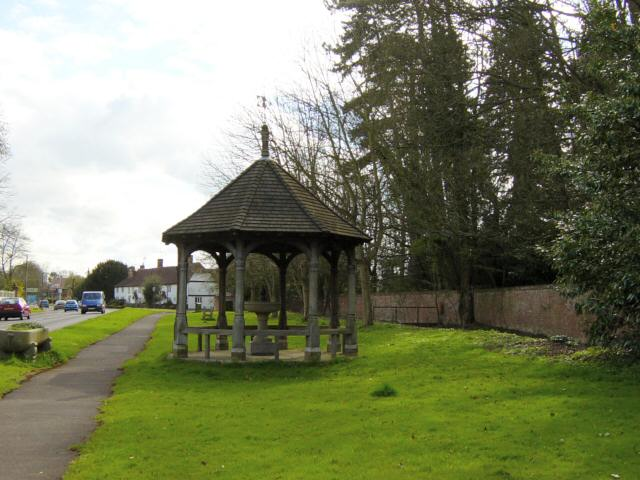
Fountain and Drinking Trough

The first mention of a postal service in Quendon was in 1793 and the village had a Penny Post service from 1813. The village post office closed in February 2008.

Quendon was an ancient parish in the Uttlesford hundred of Essex. In 1949 the parish was merged with the neighbouring parish of Rickling to form a new civil parish called Quendon and Rickling. At the 1931 census (the last before the abolition of the civil parish), Quendon had a population of 156.

== Notable residents ==
The diarist and writer William Winstanley lived in the village in the 17th century, in a Tudor farmhouse called Berries. Under the pseudonym Poor Robin Goodfellow, he wrote about the joys of celebrating Christmas. This helped to restore the custom of such celebrations after a period when they had been banned by the Puritans.

Also, Henry Winstanley famous for the design of the first Eddystone Lighthouse, and the Pamphilon family, of which several members were noted violin makers, were thought to be residents.

The astronomer Fred Hoyle lived in the village for 10 years just after the Second World War, Quendon being the closest to Cambridge he could afford to live at first. He left to live in Cambridge in late 1957, the same year he was elected a fellow of the Royal Society.

Roger Whittaker, the Kenyan-born English singer/songwriter and musician lived in the parish for a while, having bought Rickling House.

== See also ==
- The Hundred Parishes
