= Wicken Bonhunt =

Village in Essex, England

Coordinates: 51.965°N 0.145°E

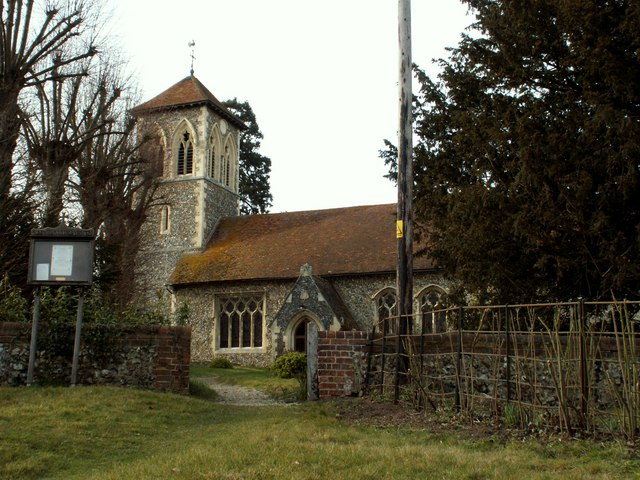
- St Margaret's Church, Wicken Bonhunt

- Location within Essex
- Population: 232 (Parish, 2021)
- OS grid reference: TL4988733346
  - London: 35 mi (56 km) SSW
- District: Uttlesford
- Shire county: Essex
- Region: East
- Country: England
- Sovereign state: United Kingdom
- Post town: SAFFRON WALDEN
- Postcode district: CB11
- Dialling code: 01799
- Police: Essex
- Fire: Essex
- Ambulance: East of England

Wicken Bonhunt is a village and civil parish in the Uttlesford district of Essex, England. It is on the B1038 road midway between the larger villages of Newport and Clavering. The nearest town is Saffron Walden, approximately 5 miles (8 km) away. Stansted Airport is approximately 10 miles (16 km) away. At the 2021 census the parish had a population of 232.

== History ==
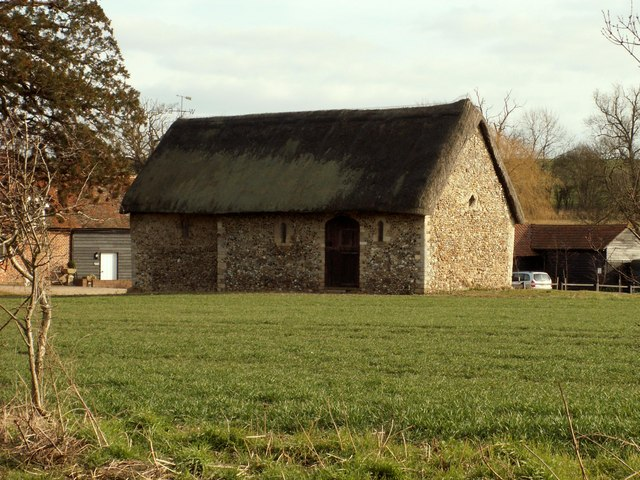
Former Chapel of St. Helen – one of the oldest surviving buildings in the east of England

Originally, Wicken Bonhunt may have been two separate communities, and the name possibly derives from old English for dairy farm (wic, pl. wicum) and huntsmen liable to be summoned (bann-huntan).

Wicken Bonhunt is listed in the Domesday Book in the hundred of Uttlesford as the manors of 'Wica' and 'Banhunta', with 23 households, nine villagers, 11 smallholders and three slaves. In 1238, it is referred to in subsidy rolls as 'Wykes Bonhunte'.

Signs of this early settlement include the 10th- or 11th-century former Chapel of St Helen in the grounds of Bonhunt Farm close to an M11 motorway flyover. It is believed to be one of the oldest surviving buildings in the east of England, and an annual service is held at the site.

A middle Saxon settlement of some size was excavated in the fields close to the Chapel in the 1970s, during the construction of the M11, with signs of an early settlement having been spotted in 1967 by a local archaeologist. Excavations found evidence of around 30 structures, including a long room, and artefacts retrieved from the site led archeologists to believe this could have been a royal manor.

Parts of the Parish Church of St Margaret, including the chancel, are early 13th century, but there was extensive restoration and rebuilding in the 1850s in 14th-century style. It is a Grade II* listed building. The interior includes a font that is thought to date from the 12th century. Other listed buildings in the village include the Grade II* 16th-century Brick House.

== Amenities ==
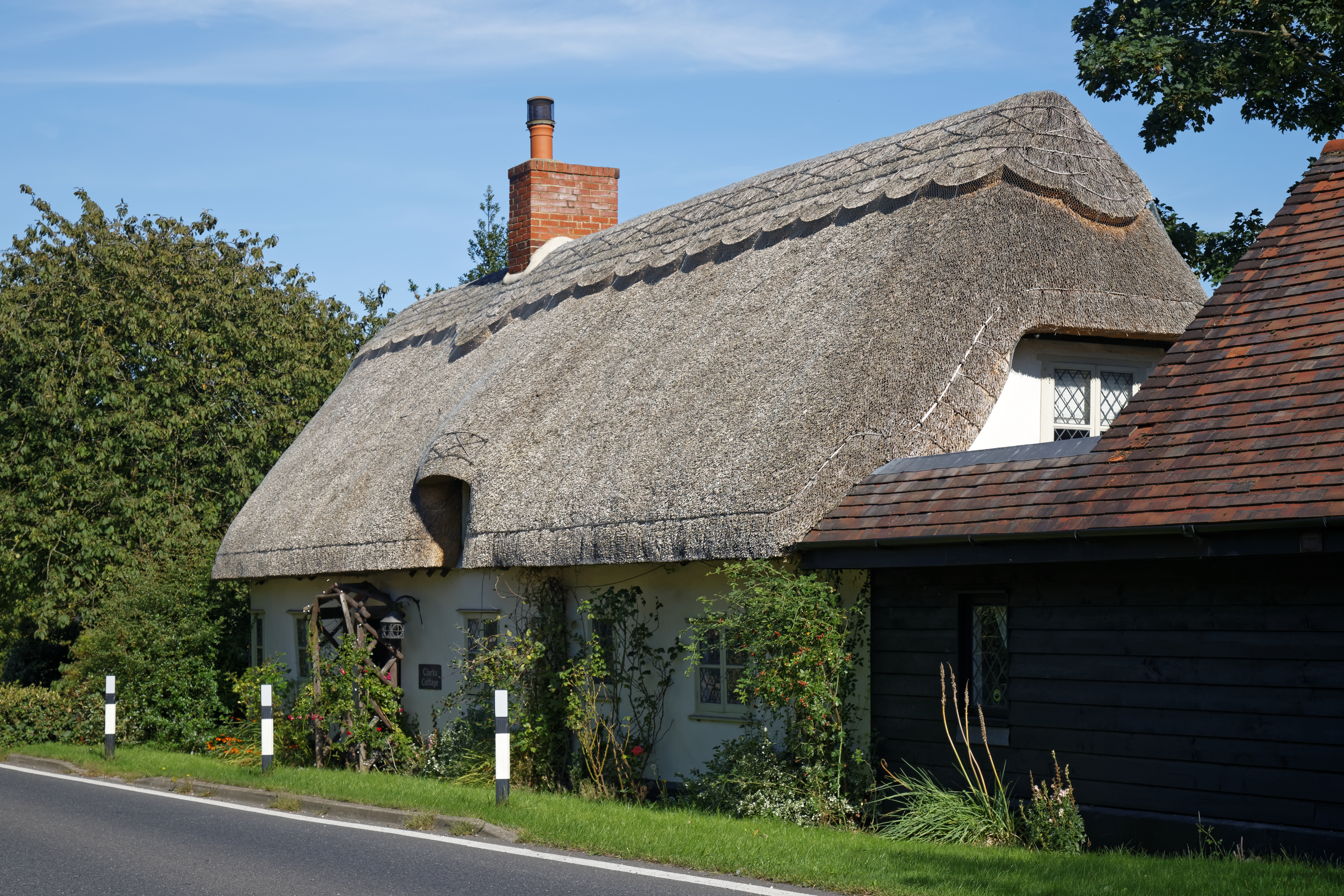
Thatched cottage at Wicken Bonhunt

Wicken Bonhunt's public house, formerly the Coach & Horses, reopened in 2012 as a Thai food pub serving real ales.

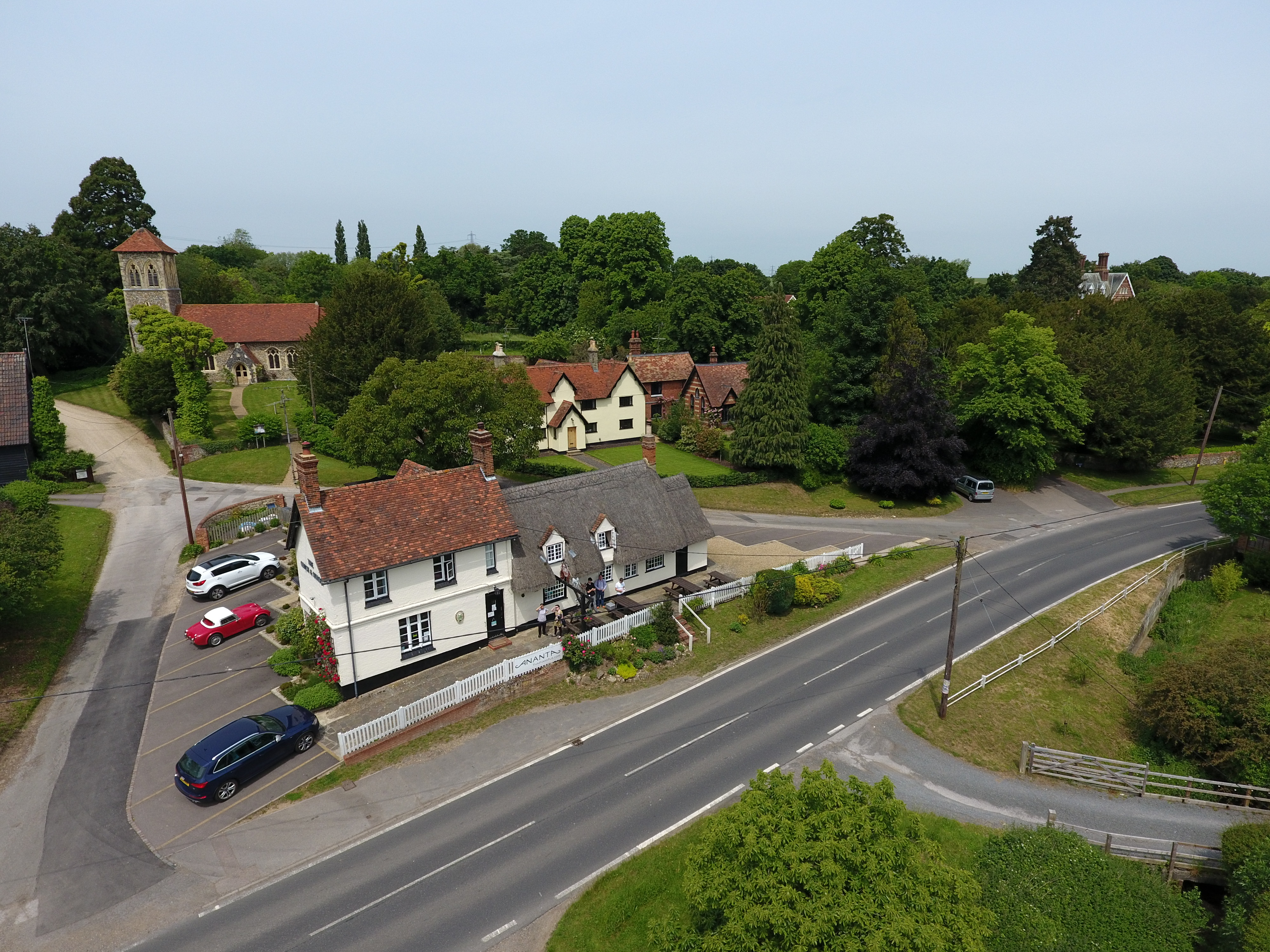
The Coach & Horses (Ananta Thai Food Pub)

A former young people's residential study centre at Wicken House was sold to property developers in 2009, having closed a year earlier. In February 2012, a new village 'hub' community centre was opened at St Margaret's Church. The £200,000 project, assisted by grants from Essex County Council, is designed as a new focal point for youth and community events following the closure of Wicken House.

== See also ==
- The Hundred Parishes
