= Desolation Peak (Wyoming) =

Mountain in the United States

- Location within Wyoming Location within the United States

Highest point
- Elevation: 13,161 ft (4,011 m)
- Prominence: 915 ft (279 m)
- Coordinates: 43°12′06″N 109°40′46″W

Geography
- Location: Sublette County, Wyoming, U.S.
- Parent range: Wind River Range
- Topo map: USGS Gannett Peak

Climbing
- First ascent: 1930 (Gustav and Theodore Koven)
- Easiest route: Scramble

Desolation Peak (13,161 ft (4,011 m)) is located in the northern Wind River Range in the U.S. state of Wyoming. Situated .66 mi (1.06 km) west of Rampart Peak, Desolation Peak is within the Bridger Wilderness of Bridger-Teton National Forest and west of the Continental Divide. Desolation Peak is the 22nd tallest peak in Wyoming.

== Hazards ==
Encountering bears is a concern in the Wind River Range. There are other concerns as well, including bugs, wildfires, adverse snow conditions and nighttime cold temperatures.

Importantly, there have been notable incidents, including accidental deaths, due to falls from steep cliffs (a misstep could be fatal in this class 4/5 terrain) and due to falling rocks, over the years, including 1993, 2007 (involving an experienced NOLS leader), 2015 and 2018. Other incidents include a seriously injured backpacker being airlifted near SquareTop Mountain in 2005, and a fatal hiker incident (from an apparent accidental fall) in 2006 that involved state search and rescue. The U.S. Forest Service does not offer updated aggregated records on the official number of fatalities in the Wind River Range.
