= William Foot Mitchell =

Sir William Foot Mitchell

Member of Parliament
- In office 15 November 1922 – 10 May 1929
- Preceded by: Cecil Beck
- Succeeded by: Rab Butler
- Constituency: Saffron Walden
- In office January 1910 – December 1910
- Preceded by: James Rowlands
- Succeeded by: James Rowlands
- Constituency: Dartford

Personal details
- Born: 26 June 1859 London, England
- Died: 31 July 1947 (aged 88) Quendon, Essex, England
- Party: Conservative
- Spouse: Elizabeth Hannah Hadley
- Children: 1
- Relatives: Algernon Winter Rose (son-in-law), Arthur William Mickle Ellis (son-in-law)

Sir William Foot Mitchell JP (26 June 1859 – 31 July 1947) was a Conservative Party politician in England.

Mitchell was Managing Director of Royal Dutch Shell plc, an Anglo–Dutch multinational oil and gas company, from 10 March 1903 to 31 December 1938, including the year that Royal Dutch Petroleum and the Shell Transport and Trading Company came together to form a petroleum company in 1907.

He spent much of his early career in the East, largely in Japan and China, before settling in the UK, buying Quendon Hall, Quendon, in 1907.

== Political career ==
He was elected to the House of Commons at the January 1910 general election as Member of Parliament (MP) for Dartford, beating the sitting Liberal-Labour MP James Rowlands. However, Rowlands regained the seat at the December 1910 general election.

Mitchell did not contest the 1918 general election, but at the 1922 general election he was elected as MP for Saffron Walden. He held the seat until he stood down at the 1929 general election.

He was knighted in 1929 by King George V.
