= Desolation Island =

Desolation Island may refer to:

- Kerguelen Islands, Indian Ocean
- Desolación Island, Chile
- Desolation Island (South Shetland Islands)
- Desolation Island (novel), a novel by Patrick O'Brian

== See also ==
- Desolation Sound, a deep water sound in British Columbia, Canada
