= Radwinter =

Village in Essex, England

Coordinates: 52.0104°N 0.3403°E

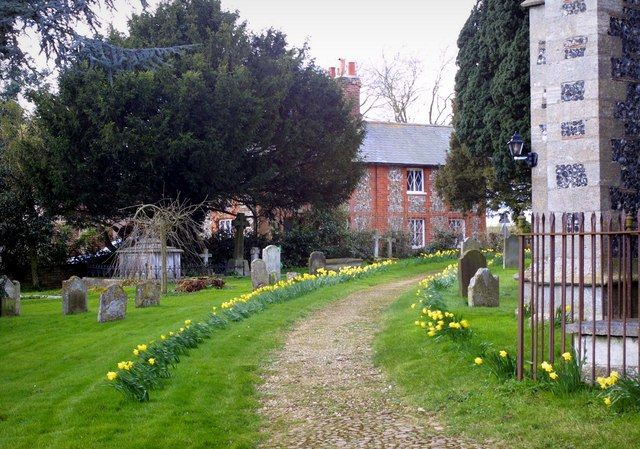
- Churchyard of St Mary's Church

- Location within Essex
- Population: 660 (Parish, 2021)
- Civil parish: Radwinter
- District: Uttlesford
- Shire county: Essex
- Region: East
- Country: England
- Sovereign state: United Kingdom
- Post town: Saffron Walden
- Postcode district: CB10
- Police: Essex
- Fire: Essex
- Ambulance: East of England

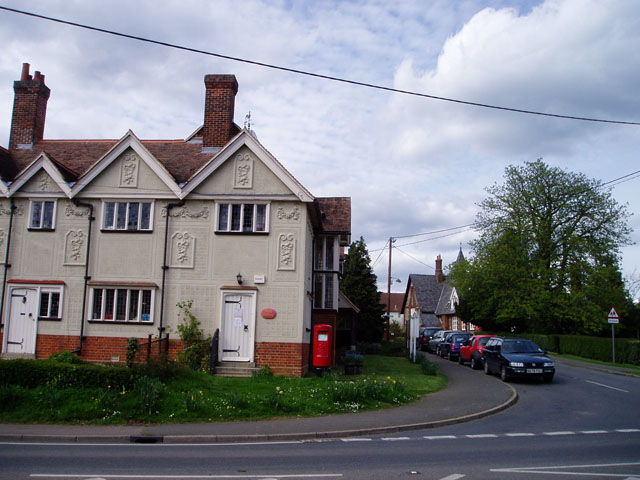
Radwinter Post Office

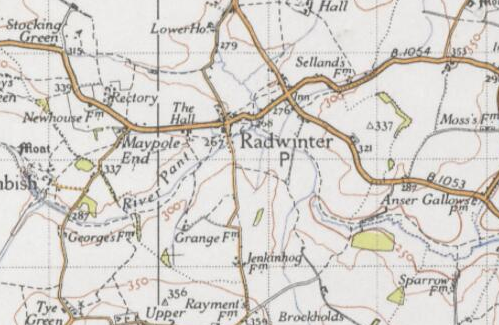
A Historic map of Radwinter 1945

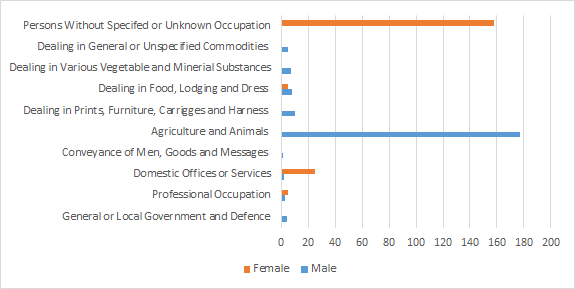
Male and Female Occupations 1881 Census

Radwinter is a village and civil parish in the Uttlesford district of Essex, England. It lies on the B1053 road, 4 miles (6 km) east of Saffron Walden, its post town. At the 2021 census the parish had a population of 660.

At the centre of the village is the 14th-century church dedicated to St Mary the Virgin, and a primary school. The village has four outlying hamlets in the district of Uttlesford, between the market town of Saffron Walden (Essex) and Haverhill (Suffolk).

In the 1870s Radwinter was described as:

The parish comprises 3,802 acres. Post-town, Saffron-Walden. Real property, £5,365. Pop., 946. Houses, 214. The property is much subdivided. Radwinter Hall, Bendish Hall, and the Hill are chief residences.

There is much local history of the parish dating back to the 1800s. "The parish was once divided into Great Radwinter and Little Radwinter however this distinction is now lost". There were also four manors in existence: Radwinter Hall, Brockhold's, Bendish Hall and Radwinter Grange. Most of what can be seen today in the centre of Radwinter is the work of the Bullock family; they were Lords of the Manor and rectors or Radwinter.

== Demographics ==
=== Population ===
The population has been changing since the 1801 census. According to the 2011 census there were 612 people living in Radwinter, 25 of them aged 0–4, 125 aged 5–17, 460 ages 18–89 and 2 that are 90 and over, showing a small dependency ratio and a large working population. In 1800 and 2011 the populations are similar, with a population of around 600. However, the figures have fluctuated. The population increased from 819 in 1831 to 916 in 1951. A boundary change from 3,100 acres in 1830 to 3,800 acres in 1850 could be a reason why the population significantly increased at that time.

=== Employment ===
The lifestyle of the people living in Radwinter has also been changing since the 1801 census. In 1881 nearly 160 women in the village did not have or had an unknown occupation and all the other women were in jobs such as domestic servants or dealing with food, lodgings and dress which was very traditional for that time period. Approximately 179 men in the village of Radwinter in 1881 had an occupation involving agriculture or animals showing the type of industry Radwinter once was. According to the 2011 census there were 165 males in employment aged 16 to 74. Of these around half are in roles evolving management, directors, senior officials, and other professional occupations. The female population of Radwinter has 142 people aged 16 to 74 in employment. The diversity of jobs is wider than the males with 44 in professional occupations, 25 in administrative and secretarial occupations and 15 in caring, Housing leisure and other service occupations.

=== Housing ===
In the 2011 census it was found that there were 229 households in Radwinter. 64 of them were of one family with a married or same sex civil partnership with dependant children, 21 were in the same type of household but with non- dependant children, and 34 has no children in the same type of household. 39 people live on their own in Radwinter, 24 of them being 65 and over. The Current average value of a house in Radwinter in March 2017 is £632,311 which is a decline from December 2016 by 0.11%. Over the past ten years the value of the average house has increased by £159,117 which is approximately 33.6%. According to Zoopla estimates

"Terraced properties sold for a current average value of £318,902 and semi-detached properties valued £365,699. In the past year property prices in Radwinter have increased 6.39%".

== Community ==
With a small population of 612 the village is small and closely connected. In Radwinter there are approximately 250 houses. Many of the old houses and cottages date back to the Tudor times, built from oak timbers from the surrounding woodland areas. Other houses are older and have been altered as time passes and other houses were built more recently such as the 20th and 21st century houses seen around Radwinter. The community centres around the parish church and post office but also has a village hall, a local primary school, a sport and recreation ground and a local public house and restaurant, The Plough Inn. The village contains several important buildings that are listed for their historical and architectural value. some of the buildings include The Old Dairy, The Old Bakehouse, The Old Brewery and Church Hill Cottages, all of which are protected by law.

== Church ==
The Saint Mary the Virgin Church was first built in the 12th century from flint and white limestone with a roof made from tile and lead, and has stood for around 700 years. The last pair of arches towards the East are the oldest, the second and third arches were decorated with mediaeval paintings up in till the 1860s when they were painted over against the advice of architect William Eden Nestfield. In 1850 the porch, door and West tower, including a spire were added and between 1868 and 1882 the church was renovated and enlarged by architect William Eden Nesfield. Reverend John Frederick Walkinson Bullock undertook the restoration on his own initiative and mostly at his own expense. The restoration included the rebuild of the chancel, south and north aisles, and the clerestory being remade from old materials. The north and south organ chambers were also added to create the church that stands today.

== See also ==
- The Hundred Parishes
