= Desolate (video game) =

2019 video game

- Developer: Nearga
- Publisher: HypeTrain Digital
- Director: Andrew Petrenko
- Producers: Andrey Sazhin, Ivan Belousov
- Engine: Unreal Engine 4
- Platform: Microsoft Windows
- Release: January 17, 2019
- Genres: Survival, action-adventure
- Modes: Single-player, multiplayer

Desolate (stylized in all caps) is an action-adventure video game developed by Nearga and published by HypeTrain Digital. The game takes place on a fictional island named Granichny, where secret experiments resulted in a massive "mutation" of the world. The player assumes the role of a Volunteer, who must research the paranormal activities of the island, gathering information and undertaking dangerous tasks.

== Gameplay ==
Desolate is a survival game set in an open world environment. It contains a dynamic day and night cycle, and is played from a first-person perspective. Most of the gameplay is built around combat, exploration and campaign storyline progression. The game can be played either in single-player, or with up to four-player co-operative multiplayer.

The game’s combat is mostly melee-based, with ammo for firearms being very rare. Players can use different weapons, which can be found throughout Granichny, as well as gathered from enemies. The weapons can also be upgraded with different modifications. Players can repair their weapon a limited number of times.

The game tracks five main elements of survival: health, hunger, thirst, cold and stress. While travelling around the game, players find various medical supplies, food and water, which can be used to restore the according element. Players can also find different crafting ingredients and blueprints, which allow them to create new items and equipment.

Throughout the game, players earn experience points by completing tasks and defeating enemies. After gathering enough experience points, players earn a skill point, which can be used to unlock various abilities and enhancements in one of the three skill trees: crafting, fighting and survival.

== Plot ==
Desolate takes place in Russia during the Soviet era. The game's prologue follows Victor Ognin, the founder of the New Light Conglomerate, as he commits an act of sabotage against his own company that will "change the world forever". Victor's actions release mutants and dangerous unnatural phenomena across the world. The epicenter of these events is the island of Granichny, off the coast of the Russian mainland. The day the world changed forever becomes known as "Day X", and Victor goes into hiding.

The main game takes place two years afterwards, with the player taking the role of a Volunteer, an agent of New Light assigned to explore Granichny on behalf of the Conglomerate in hopes of discovering a means to reverse the global damage caused by Victor. After performing various errands to gain the cooperation of the island's local population, the Volunteer is tasked by his handler, 400, to retrieve classified New Light documents. The documents reveal that New Light captured island locals and used them in human experimentation, including 400's wife and daughter, resulting in their deaths. 400's daughter, Lily, now haunts the island as a ghost that menaces the Volunteer on multiple occasions. Distraught, 400 abandons New Light and vanishes. Meanwhile, the Volunteer begins to receive mocking messages from a voice in his head that claims to be one and the same as him, and who possesses the ability to change either the Volunteer's perception of the world or the world itself, such as turning the world green or causing giant whales to swim through the sky.

The Volunteer is soon contacted by Eleanora, the leader of Pravda, an independent organization opposed to New Light that is attempting to uncover the truth behind Day X. While performing missions for Pravda, the Volunteer discovers that New Light has been deliberately converting captured locals into "Subject 47s", insane madmen who are then killed to harvest the unique moss growing in their bodies, which New Light uses as a fuel source. The Volunteer is convinced by this to turn against New Light and help Pravda broadcast a message revealing the truth to the world.

The Volunteer later learns that the spatial anomalies on the island are actually former humans who have been converted into anomalies by New Light's research. He meets Alice Ognin, Victor Ognin's daughter and a former New Light scientist, who turned herself into an anomaly in hopes this would convince her father to stop New Light's human experimentation. Alice begs the Volunteer to end her suffering, which the Volunteer does with a special device specifically designed to destroy anomalies.

Meanwhile, Pravda's headquarters are stormed by the Soviet secret police, and Eleanora and all other members of Pravda are summarily executed. 400 contacts the Volunteer and reveals that Victor Ognin is leading a breakaway splinter group of New Light headquartered in a heavily defended fortress stronghold on the island. The Volunteer decides to assassinate Ognin in the hopes of putting an end to New Light.

After infiltrating Ognin's bunker, the Volunteer confronts Ognin, who turns out to be a massive anomaly. The Ognin-Anomaly reveals it is the Voice inside the Volunteer's head. Speaking with the voices of the Voice: Victor Ognin, 400, and Eleanora, the Ognin-Anomaly explains that he accidentally destroyed the world on Day X, and altered reality to create a new world in his mind. All the people the Volunteer encountered were simply reflections of Ognin's consciousness, including the Volunteer himself, who is the embodiment of Victor's conscience and desire to correct his mistakes. Ognin informs the Volunteer that he is no longer needed, and compels him to shoot himself in the head. The Volunteer awakens back at his safe house, wondering how many times he's relived these events and how many more times they will occur. The game ends with a philosophical message from the development team thanking the player for supporting the game.

== Development ==
The core gameplay of Desolate is based on Beyond Despair - a game developed by Pixelmate, and released on January 16, 2017. Beyond Despair was not a commercial success, and Pixelmate was closed due to its financial situation.

A part of the old team created a new studio, with financial support by HypeTrain Digital, refining the gameplay from Beyond Despair, while adding new content. Most of the gameplay changes were directed by fan input. All Beyond Despair owners received a free copy of Desolate.

The game was on Steam Early Access, and now the full version is available.
