= Rampart Peak =

Mountain in Wyoming, United States

- Location within Wyoming Location within the United States

Highest point
- Elevation: 13,441 ft (4,097 m)
- Prominence: 155 ft (47 m)
- Coordinates: 43°12′09″N 109°39′59″W

Geography
- Location: Sublette County, Wyoming, U.S.
- Parent range: Wind River Range
- Topo map: USGS Gannett Peak

Climbing
- First ascent: 1946 (Phil Smith)
- Easiest route: Scramble

Rampart Peak (13,441 ft (4,097 m)) is located in the northern Wind River Range in the U.S. state of Wyoming. Situated .31 mi (0.50 km) south of Bastion Peak, Rampart Peak is within the Bridger Wilderness of Bridger-Teton National Forest and immediately west of the Continental Divide. Though one of the highest peaks in the Wind River Range, Rampart Peak is not ranked since it has less than 300 ft (91 m) of clean topographic prominence.

== Hazards ==
Encountering bears is a concern in the Wind River Range. There are other concerns as well, including bugs, wildfires, adverse snow conditions and nighttime cold temperatures.

Importantly, there have been notable incidents, including accidental deaths, due to falls from steep cliffs (a misstep could be fatal in this class 4/5 terrain) and due to falling rocks, over the years, including 1993, 2007 (involving an experienced NOLS leader), 2015 and 2018. Other incidents include a seriously injured backpacker being airlifted near SquareTop Mountain in 2005, and a fatal hiker incident (from an apparent accidental fall) in 2006 that involved state search and rescue. The U.S. Forest Service does not offer updated aggregated records on the official number of fatalities in the Wind River Range.
