= Desolate Branch =

Stream in West Virginia, United States

Coordinates: 37°23′07″N 81°52′22″W

Desolate Branch is a stream in McDowell County, West Virginia, in the United States.

Desolate Branch has been noted for its unusual place name.

== See also ==
- List of rivers of West Virginia
