= Aythorpe Roding Windmill =

Post mill at Aythorpe Roding, Essex, England

Aythorpe Roding Mill
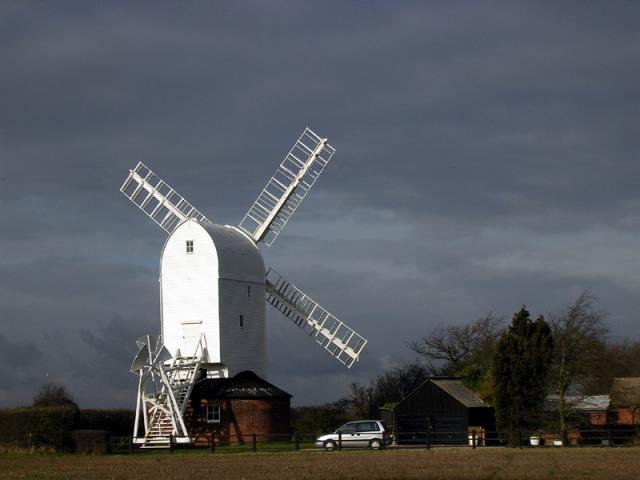
- The restored mill in February 2005
- Interactive map of Aythorpe Roding Mill

Origin
- Mill name: Aythorpe Roding Mill
- Mill location: TL 590 152
- Coordinates: 51°48′43″N 0°18′25″E
- Operator: Privately Owned
- Year built: ca. 1779

Information
- Purpose: Corn mill
- Type: Post mill
- Storeys: Three storeys
- Roundhouse storeys: Single storey roundhouse
- No. of sails: Four sails
- Type of sails: Patent sails
- Windshaft: Cast iron
- Winding: Fantail
- Fantail blades: Six blades
- No. of pairs of millstones: Two pairs

Aythorpe Roding Windmill is a Grade II* listed Post mill at Aythorpe Roding, Essex, England which has been restored to working order.

== History ==
Aythorpe Roding Windmill stands on the site of an earlier mill which was standing in 1615. It was probably built in 1779 as witnessed by the inscription Built 1779 on a timber in the mill. The mill was insured in 1798 for £50 and in 1805 for £140. The mill was drawn on the 1846 Tithe Map as having an open trestle. It was advertised in the Chelmsford Chronicle of 10 February 1860 as "for sale to be pulled down and removed by the purchaser". At some point, probably between 1860 and 1868, the mill was modernised. The common sails were replaced by patents; the wooden windshaft replaced by a cast-iron one; the layout of the millstones changed from head and tail to breast; a roundhouse was added to protect the trestle and provide storage space; a fantail was added to turn the mill to wind automatically, replacing the manual tailpole previously carried. The mill had been fitted with a fantail by 1868, and a steam engine by 1890, driving an extra pair of millstones in the roundhouse. It was working until 1937. The mill was leased by Essex County Council in 1940 Restoration by millwright Vincent Pargeter was completed in 1982. The mill ground its first grain after restoration on 3 March 1982. It was officially opened to the public by Ken Farries on 30 April 1983.

== Description ==
Aythorpe Roding Windmill is a post mill with a single-storey roundhouse. It has four double patent sails carried on a cast-iron windshaft. Two pairs of millstones are located in the breast. The mill is winded by fantail. The mill is 44 feet 3 inches (13.49 m) high to the roof.

=== Trestle and roundhouse ===
The crosstrees are 24 feet (7.32 m) long. The upper crosstree is 10 inches (254 mm) square in section and the lower crosstree is 13 inches (330 mm) by 12 inches (305 mm). The upper crosstree is made of two pieces of timber, scarf jointed in the vertical plane, and with an iron plate bolted under the join. There is also an oak plate on one side of the crosstree, which is bolted to the crosstree, a pair of spacers being used as the scarf is within the horns of the main post. The lower crosstree bears a date of 1869, which is probably the date the roundhouse was erected. The main post is 20 feet 3 inches (6.17 m) in length, and 30 inches (762 mm) by 29 inches (737 mm) in section at its base. It is fitted with a cast-iron Samson head by Christie and Norris, the Chelmsford millwrights.

=== Body ===
The body of the mill measures 21 feet (6.40 m) by 12 feet (3.66 m) in plan, making this the largest post mill in Essex. The crown tree is 20 inches (508 mm) square in section at the ends, and 20 inches (508 mm) by 19 inches (483 mm) at the centre.

=== Sails and windshaft ===
The windshaft is of cast iron, replacing a former wooden one. It was probably secondhand when fitted as it is longer than is really necessary. The mill has four double Patent sails. The mill would originally have been built with Common sails and a wooden windshaft.

=== Machinery ===
The Brake Wheel was converted from Compass arm construction. It has a six-armed, cast-iron centre and wooden rim and it is 10 feet 2 inches (3.10 m) diameter. The mill was originally built with the millstones arranged head and tail, and was converted to a breast stone layout at the time the cast-iron windshaft and patent sails were fitted. The wallower is wooden, and was secondhand when fitted to the mill, as was the cast-iron great spur wheel.

== Millers ==
Millers recorded at the mill include:

- William Glasscock 1615 (previous mill)
- Joshua Wright 1798
- Joseph Knight 1805
- Tabrum 1833
- Stephen Crossingham 1848 - 1850
- E P Bennett 1866
- James Webster 1874 - 1878
- Charles Large 1882
- Thomas Belsham 1890
- Ernest and John (Note: John Belsham was known as Jack) Belsham 1906 - 1937

== Culture and media ==
Aythorpe Roding Windmill appeared in an episode of The Protectors titled Triple Cross which was filmed in 1972.
