= Stansted Mountfitchet Windmill =

Windmill in Stansted Mountfitchet, England

Stansted Mill
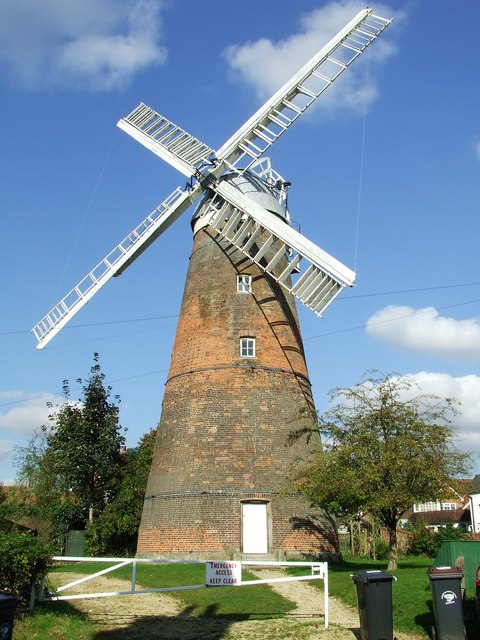
- The restored mill, October 2007
- Interactive map of Stansted Mill

Origin
- Mill name: Stansted Mill
- Mill location: TL 509 248
- Coordinates: 51°54′04″N 0°11′38″E
- Operator: Private
- Year built: 1787

Information
- Purpose: Corn mill
- Type: Tower mill
- Storeys: Five storeys
- No. of sails: Four sails
- Type of sails: Patent sails
- Windshaft: cast iron
- Winding: Fantail
- Fantail blades: Eight blades
- No. of pairs of millstones: Three pairs

Stansted Mountfitchet Windmill is a grade II* listed tower mill at Stansted Mountfitchet, Essex, England which is also a Scheduled Ancient Monument. It has been restored and can turn by wind.

== History ==
Stansted Mountfitchet Windmill was built in 1787 for Joseph Lindsell. Lindsell sold the mill in 1807 to Henry Chaplin, who mortgaged the mill to Robert Sworder in April 1808. Chaplin died in 1844 and the mill was offered for sale by auction on 22 December 1846 without a buyer being found.

In 1847, it was reported that one pair of sails required replacement. The old Common sails were replaced with a pair of spring sails at a cost of £29 4s 0d by Thomas Seabrook, millwright of Furneaux Pelham, Hertfordshire. In March 1848, it was reported that one of the remaining common sails had blown down, and the remaining sail was not fit for further work. A pair of “new patent sails” was fitted at a cost of £12 5s 0d, with a new sail back costing a further £5 13s 4d. In November 1848 the mill was again working on two sails, and another pair of patent sails were fitted at a cost of £23. Hicks demanded a reduction in rent from £60 to £45 per annum at midsummer 1850, which he was successful in obtaining. In 1850, Hicks wrote “The mill has ground scarcely anything for the last month for want of wind there is great loss of time often. A windmill is not worth much with the present trade.”

Hicks left the mill in 1853, and recommended William Randall Dixon to be the next tenant. Dixon took the mill on a seven-year lease at £45 in May that year. A bake office was built in February 1854 at Dixon's request and the rent was increased to £55. An oak stock was reported as cracked at about this time, and the mill was again reduced to two sails in September 1854 as a stock was defective. Dixon left the mill in 1856 and Edward Hicks again took the tenancy of the mill.

In 1860 Hicks asked for the mill to be modernised and asked the owner to install a steam engine to assist the sails. That proposal was rejected, but a new windshaft was required and a fantail was asked for in return for an increase in rent. The cap frame was also repaired, with a new weatherbeam fitted. A new cast iron windshaft was fitted by Seabrook at a cost of £25. Seabrook fitted a new fantail in that year at a cost of a further £25. Hicks left the mill in June 1861, and a local man by the name of Ervin took the mill at a reduced rent of £40. In 1862, millwright Fyson of Soham remodelled the machinery, converting the mill from an underdrift mill to an overdrift mill at a cost of £58 13s 7d. The stage and round house were removed at this time. John Buck took the mill in 1863 at a rent of £20, and reported that various work done by Fyson was faulty. Rectification was carried out by Seabrook. The mill was sold to William White in January 1865 for £1,150.

By 1870, the mill had four double patent sails which were over 7 feet (2.1 m) wide. The mill last worked commercially in 1910 to crush oats. In 1930, the tower had to be strengthened with three iron bands and in 1934 the second Lord Blyth had the mill repaired and presented it to the parish. The mill served as a Scout hut from the 1940s to 1963. It was scheduled as an Ancient Monument in 1952. The mill was opened to the public for the first time in 1964, with restoration work being done in 1966. In 1984–5, the mill was repaired by Millwrights International of Mapledurham, Berkshire at a cost of £14,000. The work enabled both the cap and sails to turn. In 2003, the mill was struck by lightning during an open day. In 2005, it was reported that repairs costing £70,000 were needed. An appeal to local residents for support in raising money towards the repair of the mill was generally ignored, despite leafletting every house in Stansted Mountfitchet.

== Description ==
Stansted Mountfitchet Windmill is a five-storey tower mill with a domed cap winded by an eight bladed fantail. The tower is 21 feet 6 inches (6.55 m) diameter at base, and 10 feet (3.05 m) diameter at curb level. The brickwork is only 27 inches (690 mm) thick at ground level, and generally only about 18 inches (460 mm) at higher levels. This has resulted in a weak tower which required strengthening with three iron bands. Height of the tower is 47 feet (14.33 m) from ground level to curb. the cap is 10 feet (3.05 m) from curb to roof hatch, giving the mill an overall height of 57 feet (17.37 m) The cast iron windshaft is in two parts, with a separate tail section. It carries four single patent sails (originally double patents, later cut down), and a wooden 8 feet (2.44 m) diameter clasp arm brake wheel of oak and elm with 99 iron segment teeth. This drives a wooden wallower with 44 teeth carried on a wooden upright shaft. The clasp arm great spur wheel is 8 feet (2.44 m) diameter, with 140 cogs. It drives three pairs of overdrift millstones. The stone nuts having 28 teeth each.

As originally built, the mill had a wooden windshaft, and a stage, which was 24 feet (7.32 m) above ground level. The mill was built with four common sails carried on a wooden windshaft. The cap was winded by hand. The mill was originally an underdrift mill, with the millstones a floor higher than they are now. A lean-to structure known as the roundhouse was attached to the mill below stage level.

== Millers ==
- Joseph Lindsell 1787
- Charles Smith 1830s
- Charles & Edward Hicks 1846–1853
- William Randall Dixon 1853–1856
- Edward Hicks 1856–1861
- Ervin 1861–1863
- John Buck 1863–1865
- Edward Hicks 1865–1867
- William White 1867 –
- Edward Hicks & Sons 1890

References for above:-

== Public access ==
Stansted Mountfitchet Windmill is operated on behalf of the Trustees by a voluntary organisation called 'The Stansted Millers'. They administer the public access and it is open from Easter to October on the first Sunday of each month, most Bank Holidays and other special days from 1.30 - 5.30pm. The admission charge is £3 for adults, £1 for children 5-16 and is free to under school age.
