= Desolation (2017 film) =

- Directed by: Sam Patton
- Written by: Matt Anderson; Michael Larson-Kangas
- Produced by: Mara Barr; Lauren Bates; Kim Patton; Sam Patton
- Starring: Jaimi Page; Alyshia Ocshe; Toby Nichols
- Cinematography: Andi Obarski
- Edited by: Alexander Frasse
- Music by: Marcus Bagala
- Production company: Desolated Productions
- Distributed by: IFC Midnight
- Release date: December 15, 2017
- Running time: 78 minutes
- Country: United States
- Language: English

Desolation is a 2017 American horror thriller film directed by Sam Patton, written by Matt Anderson and Michael Larson-Kangas, and starring Jaimi Page, Alyshia Ocshe and Toby Nichols. It is Patton's feature directorial debut.

== Synopsis ==
A mother takes her son on a trip into remote wilderness to scatter his father’s ashes; they must confront their worst fears when a lone hiker begins following them.

== Cast ==
- Toby Nichols as Sam
- Jaimi Paige as Abby
- Alyshia Ochse as Jen
- Claude Duhamel as Hiker
- Dominik Garcia as Katie

== Release ==
The film was released on December 15, 2017.

== Reception ==
The film has a 58% rating on Rotten Tomatoes based on twelve reviews.

Frank Scheck of The Hollywood Reporter gave the film a negative review, describing it as "Too subtle for its own good."

Jeannette Catsoulis of The New York Times gave the film a positive review, describing it as "notable mainly for the beautifully organic performances of its two female leads."

Ben Pearson of /Film rated the film a 6 out of 10 and wrote, "Anyone looking for a pared down, character-driven survival story won't be disappointed with Desolation."

Noel Murray of the Los Angeles Times gave the film a negative review, describing it as "honorable in intent, but dreary in execution."
