= Songs from the Chinese Poets =

Song series

Songs from the Chinese Poets are series of settings in six parts by Granville Bantock. The English song texts were mainly supplied by Captain L. A. Cranmer Byng (1872-1945), who had also supplied the text for Choral Suite from the Chinese (1914). Launcelot Alfred Cranmer-Byng was part of the Byng baronets family and wrote various books on China.

In 1933 the first set were also arranged in the form of a four movement string quartet under the title In a Chinese Mirror. It was recorded for the first time by the Tippett Quartet in 2021.

Bantock also set other English translations of Chinese poetry from Edward Powys Mathers (Five Chinese Songs) and Herbert Giles (Ten Songs from the Chinese, 1943).

== Songs ==
Songs from the Chinese Poets, Series I (1918)

- The old fisherman of the mists and waters
- The ghost road
- Under the moon
- The celestial weaver
- Return of spring

Songs from the Chinese Poets, Series II (1919)

- The tomb of Chao-Chün
- A dream of spring
- Desolation
- The Island of Pines
- The pavilion of abounding joy

Songs from the Chinese Poets, Series III

- From the tomb of an unknown woman
- Adrift
- The golden nenuphar
- Yung-Yang
- A feast of lanterns

Songs from the Chinese Poets, Series IV

- Autumn across the Frontier
- The Kingfisher's Tower
- On the banks of Jo-Eh
- Despair
- The last revel

Songs from the Chinese Poets, Series V

- The court of dreams
- Down the Hwai
- Night on the mountain
- The lost one
- Memories with the dusk return
- And there are tears

Songs from the Chinese Poets, Series VI

- The King of Tang
- Wild geese
- Exile
- Willow flowers
- Dreaming at Golden Hill
- Galloping home

== Recordings ==
John McCormack recorded "Desolation" in Australia in 1927.
