= St Mary the Virgin's Church, Stansted Mountfitchet =

Coordinates: 51.8953°N 0.2092°E

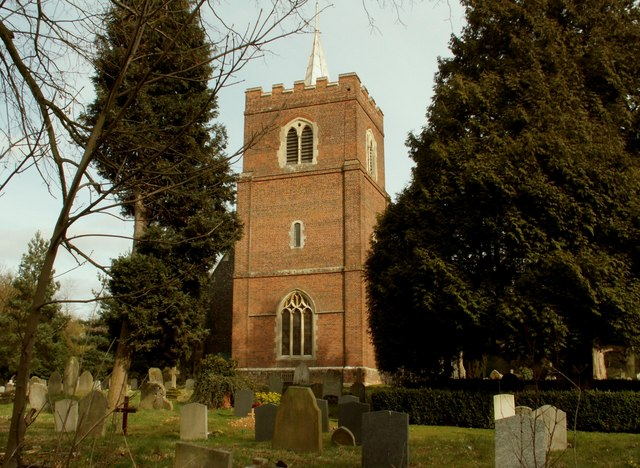
- Tower of St Mary the Virgin's Church, Stansted Mountfitchet

- Location in Essex
- OS grid reference: TL 521 242
- Location: Stansted Mountfitchet, Essex
- Country: England
- Denomination: Anglican
- Website: Churches Conservation Trust

History
- Dedication: Saint Mary the Virgin

Architecture
- Functional status: Redundant
- Heritage designation: Grade II*
- Designated: 21 February 1967
- Architect: Francis T. Dollman (restoration)
- Architectural type: Church
- Style: Norman, Gothic

Specifications
- Materials: Flint and stone, brick tower

St Mary the Virgin's Church is a redundant Anglican church near the village of Stansted Mountfitchet, Essex, England. It is recorded in the National Heritage List for England as a designated Grade II* listed building, and is under the care of the Churches Conservation Trust. It stands about 1 mile (1.6 km) to the southeast of the village in the grounds of Stansted Hall. The church has been listed because of its "historical value and internal features".

== History ==
The church was built between 1120 and 1124 by William Mountfitchet and still retains some features from that time. In the 13th century the chancel was extended towards the east, and a chapel was added to the north side of the church. The west tower was added in 1692. The church was extensively restored in 1888 by Francis T. Dollman, at which time the nave and the aisle were rebuilt. A chapel of ease dedicated to Saint John the Evangelist was built in 1889 nearer the centre of the village. This church is now the parish church of Stansted Mountfitchet. St Mary's remains consecrated and is used for occasional services and other events.

== Architecture ==
St Mary's is constructed in flint and stone, and the tower is in brick. The chancel arch and the north and south doorways survive from the original building, and are in Norman style. The chancel arch is decorated with zigzag and ball flower carving. The doorways are similar and each has three orders of columns with scalloped capitals and saltire decoration. The tympanum in each doorway is decorated with diapering.

The font dates from the 13th century, and its ogee-shaped cover from the 17th century. The communion rail is from the 18th century. The monuments include the stone effigy of a knight in armour lying in a recess with his legs crossed. It is said to be a memorial to Roger de Lancaster who died in 1310. The other significant monuments date from the 17th century. The monument to Sir Thomas Middleton consists of a recumbent effigy lying on a sarcophagus under a coffered arch carried on black marble Corinthian columns. The other is an altar tomb to Hester Middleton who died in 1614, again with a recumbent figure on a sarcophagus. Hester was either the wife, or the daughter of Sir Thomas.

== External features ==
The churchyard contains the war graves of five service personnel of World War I, and four of World War II.

== Tower & Bells ==
The brick tower contains a ring of eight bells, cast by wide mix of different founders. The way these bells are hung/rung is especially rare, as they are organised in an anti-clockwise fashion, unlike in most other bell-towers where ringing circle is organised in a clockwise configuration. The largest of the eight bells weighs 13 Hundred-weight. Despite the church being redundant these bells continue to be regularly rung, and a monthly practice is organised by the North-Western district of the "Essex Association of Change Ringers" which is held, (Starting from 7:45pm) usually on the second Friday of every month - apart from April & August due to the regional ringing school & summer holidays respectively.

== See also ==
- List of churches preserved by the Churches Conservation Trust in the East of England
