= Aythorpe Roding =

Village in Essex, England

Coordinates: 51.8114°N 0.2977°E

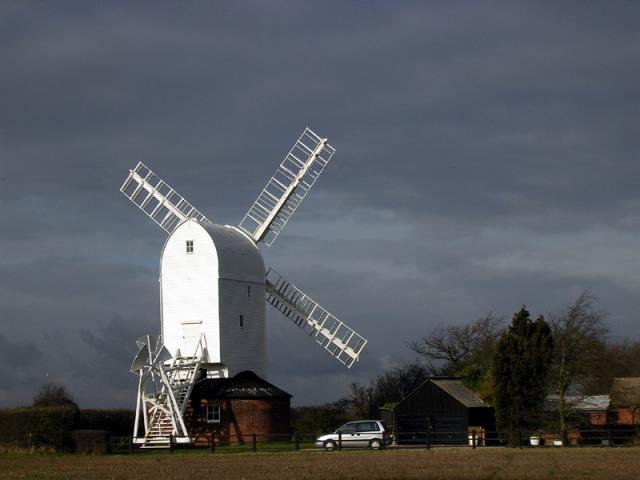
- Aythorpe Roding windmill

- Location within Essex
- Population: 257 (Parish, 2021)
- OS grid reference: TL584150
- Civil parish: Aythorpe Roding
- District: Uttlesford
- Shire county: Essex
- Region: East
- Country: England
- Sovereign state: United Kingdom
- Post town: DUNMOW
- Postcode district: CM6
- Dialling code: 01279
- Police: Essex
- Fire: Essex
- Ambulance: East of England
- UK Parliament: Saffron Walden

Aythorpe Roding is a village and civil parish in the Uttlesford district of Essex, England. The village is included in the eight hamlets and villages called The Rodings. Aythorpe Roding is 9 miles (14 km) north-west from the county town of Chelmsford. At the 2021 census the parish had a population of 257.

The parish is in the parliamentary constituency of Saffron Walden. Local governance is through its own parish council.

Aythorpe Roding has a village hall and a cricket club.

== History ==
According to A Dictionary of British Place Names, Roding derives from "Rodinges" as is listed in the Domesday Book, with the later variation 'Roeng Aytrop' recorded in 1248. The 'Aytrop' refers to the manorial possession by a man called 'Aitrop' held under the ownership of the Abbess of Barking. An earlier alternative name for the manor was 'Grumbalds Roding'. During the reign of James I the manor was in the possession of Thomas Aylet, and was passed to a Richard Luther in 1670. In 1751, by which time the settlement was also termed 'Eythorp Roding', it was in the hands of John Barrington, the manorial lord of Hatfield Broad Oak.

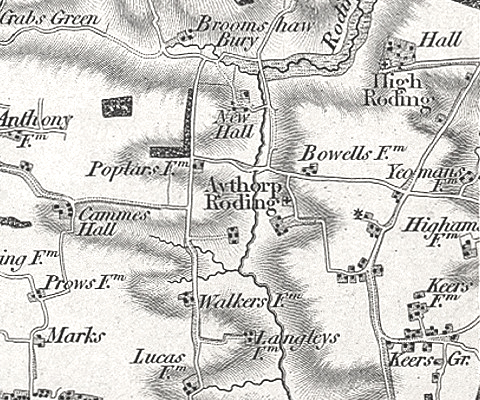
Ordnance Survey map 1805 showing 'Aythorp Roding'

In 1848 and 1882 directories the parish and village was termed 'Aythrop Roothing' and was in the Dunmow Hundred. It was also in the Dunmow Union—poor relief provision set up under the Poor Law Amendment Act 1834—and part of the Rural Deanery of Roding. The registers of the church of St Mary the Virgin date to 1559. The parish living was a rectory with a parsonage, a small brick building, with 20 acres of glebe, being land used for the support of the incumbent. In 1848 the living was in the gift of the rector of Stondon Massey. The Lord of the manor lived at Aythrop Roothing Hall. There were six principal landowners, including Gobert's Charity which owned the small Keeres Manor in the parish.

Population in 1841 was 285, and in 1881, 237. Parish area in 1848 was 1,361 acres (5.5 km^{2}), and in 1882, 1,393 acres (5.6 km^{2}). Crops grown at the time were chiefly wheat, barley and beans, on a heavy soil with a clay subsoil. Parish occupations in 1848 included nine farmers, a beer retailer, a shopkeeper and a blacksmith. By 1882 the number of farmers included had reduced to five, with one being a landowner, the licensee of The Carpenters' Arms public house, a grocer & draper, the miller at the windmill, and a blacksmith.

== See also ==
- The Hundred Parishes
