= Rickling, Essex =

Village in Essex, England

Coordinates: 51.961°N 0.175°E

Rickling
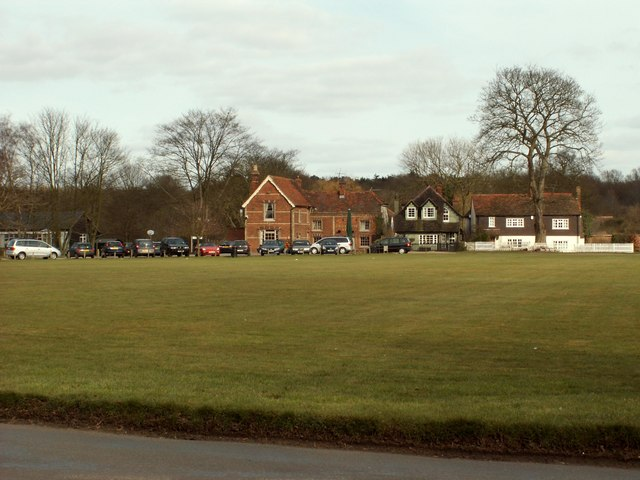
- Rickling Green

- Location within Essex
- OS grid reference: TL498314
  - London: 30 mi (48 km) SSW
- Civil parish: Quendon and Rickling
- District: Uttlesford
- Shire county: Essex
- Region: East
- Country: England
- Sovereign state: United Kingdom
- Post town: Saffron Walden
- Postcode district: CB11
- Police: Essex
- Fire: Essex
- Ambulance: East of England

Rickling is a village in the civil parish of Quendon and Rickling, in the Uttlesford district of Essex, England. The village is situated approximately 6 miles (10 km) north from the town of Bishop's Stortford. Saffron Walden, at 5 miles (8 km), and the larger village of Newport, at 2 miles (3 km), lie to the north-east.

Rickling is 1 mile (1.6 km) north-west from the village of Quendon. Rickling is the site of the parish church, All Saints, and a few houses. Rickling Green, 2 miles (3 km) from Rickling, is conjoined to Quendon.

== History ==
The name Rickling is found in the Domesday Book as Richelinga. It is recorded as having quite a large population of 34 households, and it paid substantial taxes of eight geld units.

Richelinga or Rickling derives from an Old English personal name Ricula and inga, thus ‘followers of the people of Ricula’. The wife of Sledda King of the East Saxons (c.587-604) and sister of Æthelberht of Kent was named Ricula, though an association with this manor has not been proven.

It is not known definitively why the main population today at Rickling Green is so far from its church at Rickling, but it has been suggested this may have been due to the plague. Another theory is that, over time, the villagers settled closer to the once busy drovers' road (the former A11) that runs through Quendon.

Rickling was an ancient parish in the Uttlesford hundred of Essex. In 1949 the parish was merged with the neighbouring parish of Quendon to form a new civil parish called Quendon and Rickling. At the 1931 census (the last before the abolition of the civil parish), Rickling had a population of 378.

== Amenities ==
There is a small primary school in Rickling Green, serving the village and surrounding communities and joined in federation with Farnham primary school, with the schools sharing one head teacher and governing body.

There is also a public house, The Cricketers Arms, Rickling Green (not to be confused with The Cricketers in nearby Clavering), which overlooks the green. The village green is also home to Rickling Ramblers Cricket Club. Cricket has been played on the green since 1850 and takes place throughout the summer months.

== Landmarks ==
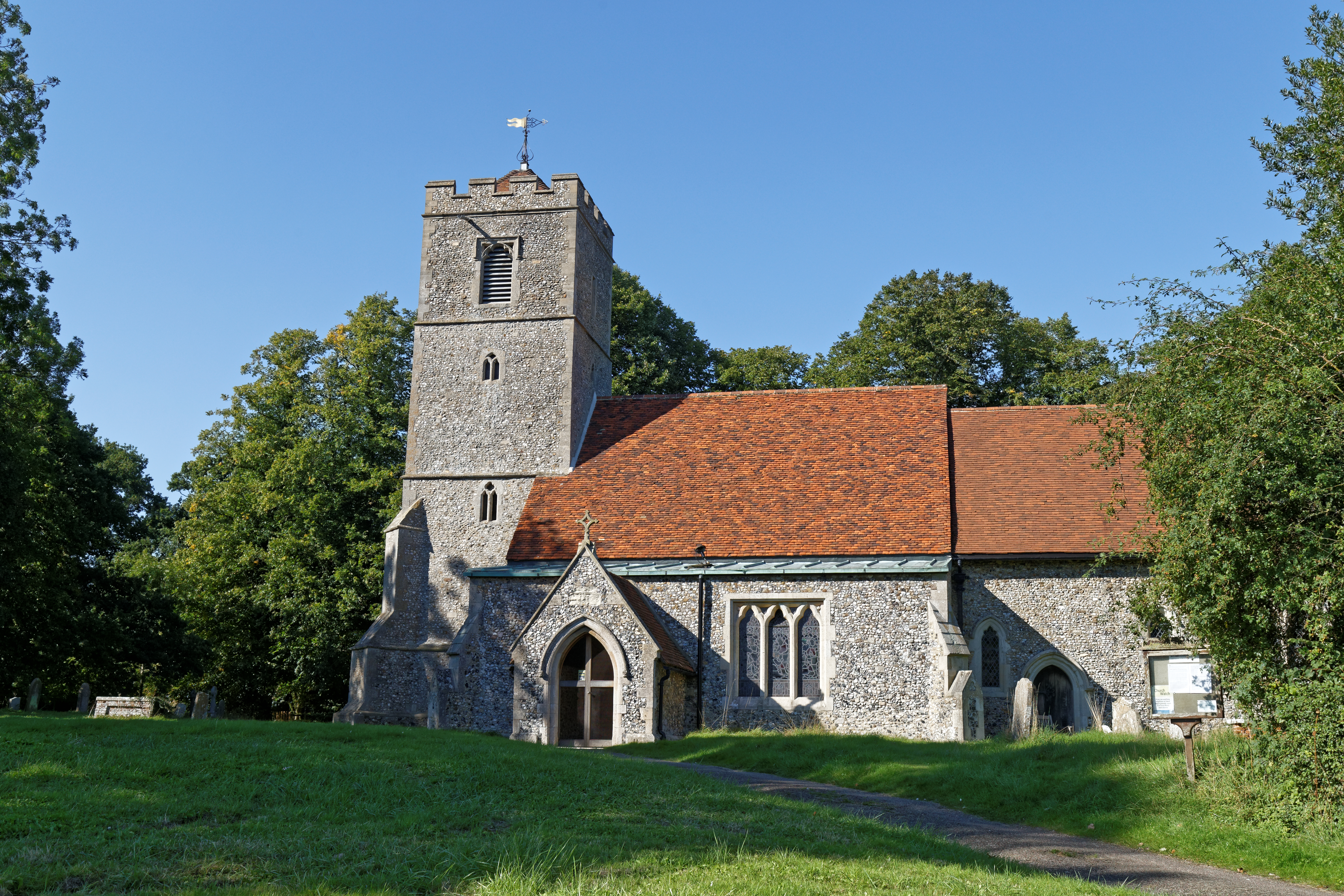
All Saints', Rickling is located some distance north of the main village centre at Rickling Green

All Saints' Church, Rickling, a Grade I listed building, is a 13th-century flint church, although the nave's unusual proportions may indicate a pre-conquest date. The chancel, south aisle and west tower were built in 1340. There were later alterations in the 15th and 16th centuries, with further additions and restoration in the 19th century. Significant features include the 14th-century chancel screen and pulpit.

Rickling Hall, a Grade II* listed farmhouse, stands on the site of a former castle and includes a moated castle mound to the south of the present building. Rickling and Rickling Green contain a number of other listed buildings, many of them dating from the 17th century.

== See also ==
- The Hundred Parishes

== External sources ==
- Village website
- Quendon and Rickling churches website
- Cricketers Arms, Rickling Green
- Federation of Farnham and Rickling C of E primary schools
