= Barclays Bank, Saffron Walden =

Building in Saffron Walden, Essex, England

Coordinates: 52°01′26″N 0°14′30″E

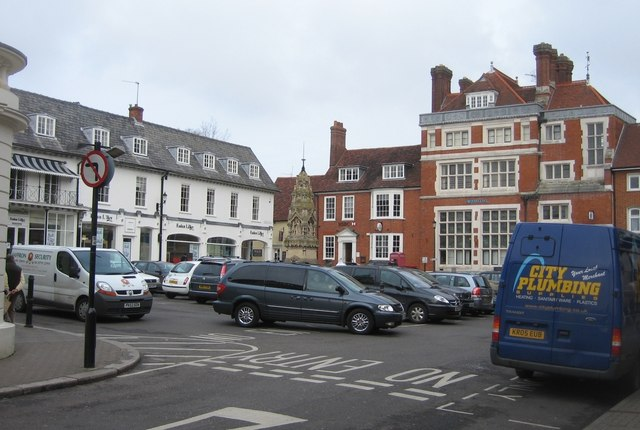
Gibson's bank, Market Place, Saffron Walden

Barclays Bank, Market Place, Saffron Walden, Essex, England has been designated a Grade II* listed building by Historic England. It was first listed in 1972.

It was built in 1874 for George Stacey Gibson, sole proprietor of the Saffron Walden and North Essex Bank, and designed by William Eden Nesfield. It is now a branch of Barclays Bank.
