= John W. Judd =

American judge (1839–1919)

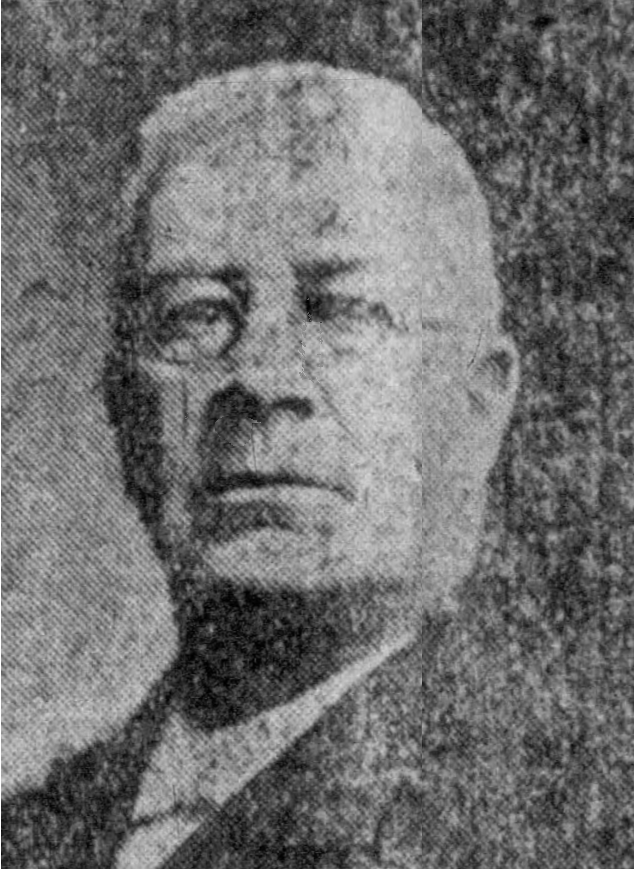
Judge John W. Judd

John Waltus Judd (September 6, 1839 – January 27, 1919) was a justice of the Supreme Court of the Utah Territory from 1888 to 1889.

== Early life, education, and military service ==
Born in Sumner County, Tennessee, Judd was educated in the public schools and read law in the office of Judge Joseph C. Stark in Springfield, Tennessee. He served in Morgan's cavalry during the American Civil War.

In 1861 he enlisted in company C, 49th Tennessee Infantry, and was taken prisoner with his regiment at the fall of Fort Donelson in February 1862. In September of that year he was released in a prisoner exchange. He transferred to the 9th Tennessee Cavalry in the spring of 1863, and was with Morgan and his raid into Ohio. He was also in the battles of Chickamauga, Missionary Ridge and at Wytheville, Virginia. He was severely injured at Mount Sterling, Kentucky in June 1864. He was captured in confined at Camp Chase in Ohio until near the close of the war.

== Career in government ==
In 1888, President Grover Cleveland appointed Judd to the Utah territorial supreme court. After Judd's resignation from the court, he was appointed attorney general of the Utah territory from 1893 to 1898. After this appointment expired, Judd formed a law partnership with Jabez G. Sutherland before returning to his native Tennessee.

In 1898 he came to Nashville, where he served for a time as an attorney for the Louisville & Nashville Railroad About 12 years prior to his death he retired from the practice of law but retained the chair of law at Vanderbilt University. Between 1910 and 1911, he went to Puerto Rico and spent about eight months there straightening out the public franchise and public utilities, at the request of Secretary of War Jacob M. Dickinson.

== Death ==
In 1919, Judd was given a furlough from his position at Vanderbilt due to his failing health. Judd died at his home in Gallatin, Tennessee. In later years, Congressman Joseph W. Byrns Jr. "spoke of his father's visitors on long winter evenings at home; Judge John W. Judd, later a Utah Territorial Supreme Court judge, especially inspired young Joe Byrns".
