= Newport, Essex =

Village in Essex, England

Coordinates: 51.982449°N 0.213573°E

Newport
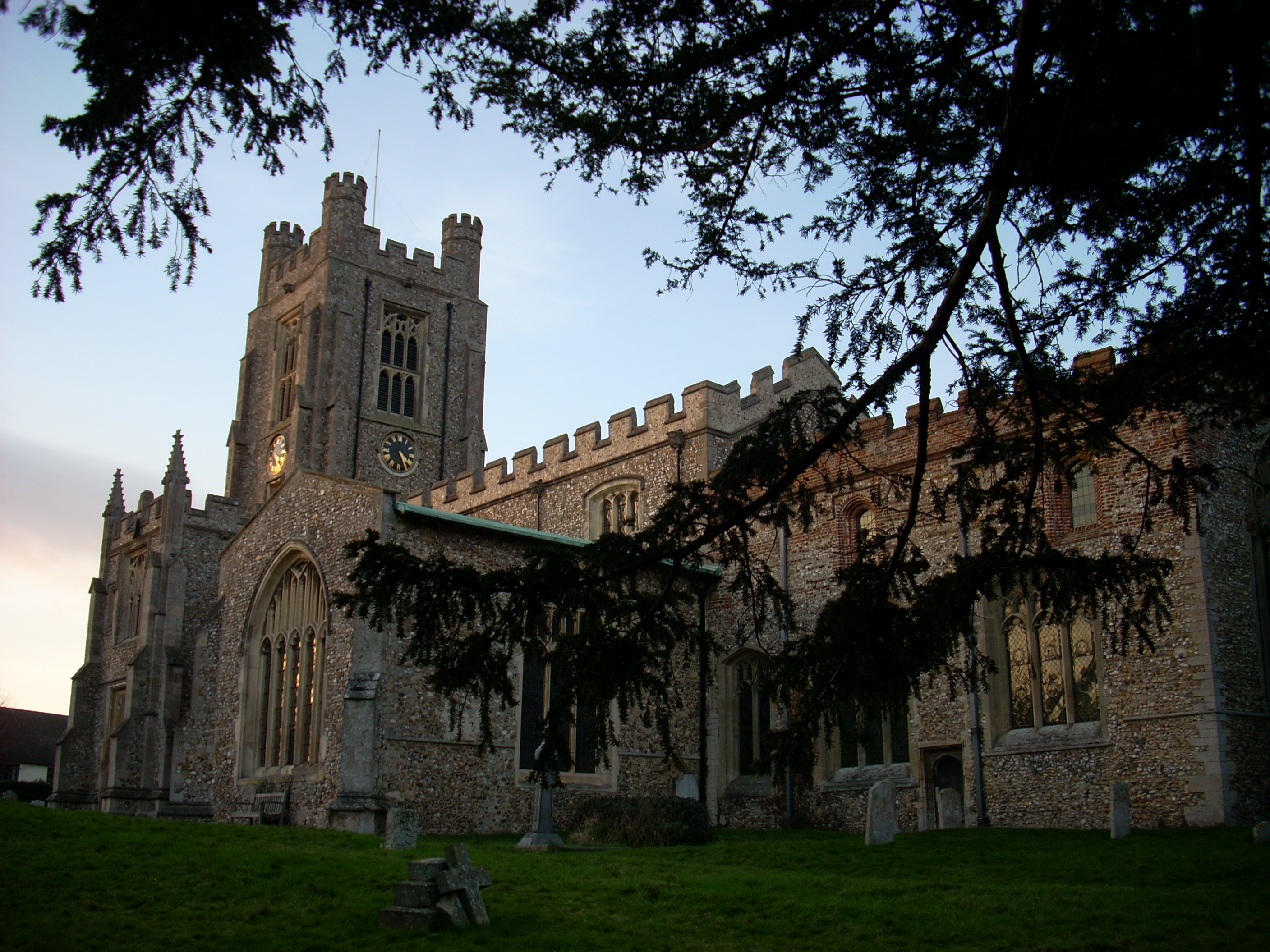
- Parish church of St Mary the Virgin

- Location within Essex
- Population: 2,936 (Parish, 2021)
- Civil parish: Newport
- District: Uttlesford
- Shire county: Essex
- Region: East
- Country: England
- Sovereign state: United Kingdom
- Post town: Saffron Walden
- Postcode district: CB11
- Dialling code: 01799
- Police: Essex
- Fire: Essex
- Ambulance: East of England
- UK Parliament: North West Essex

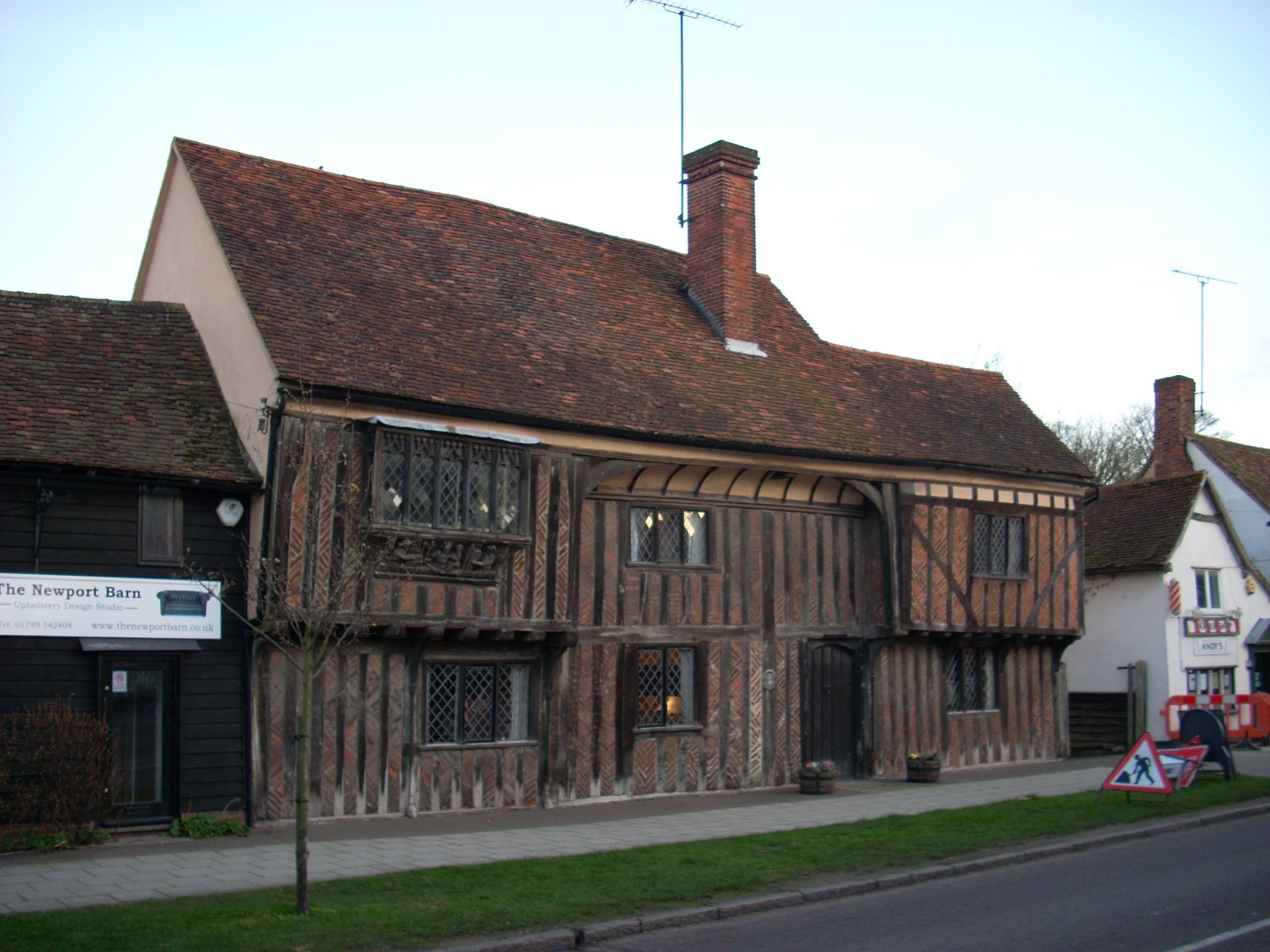
Monks' Barn

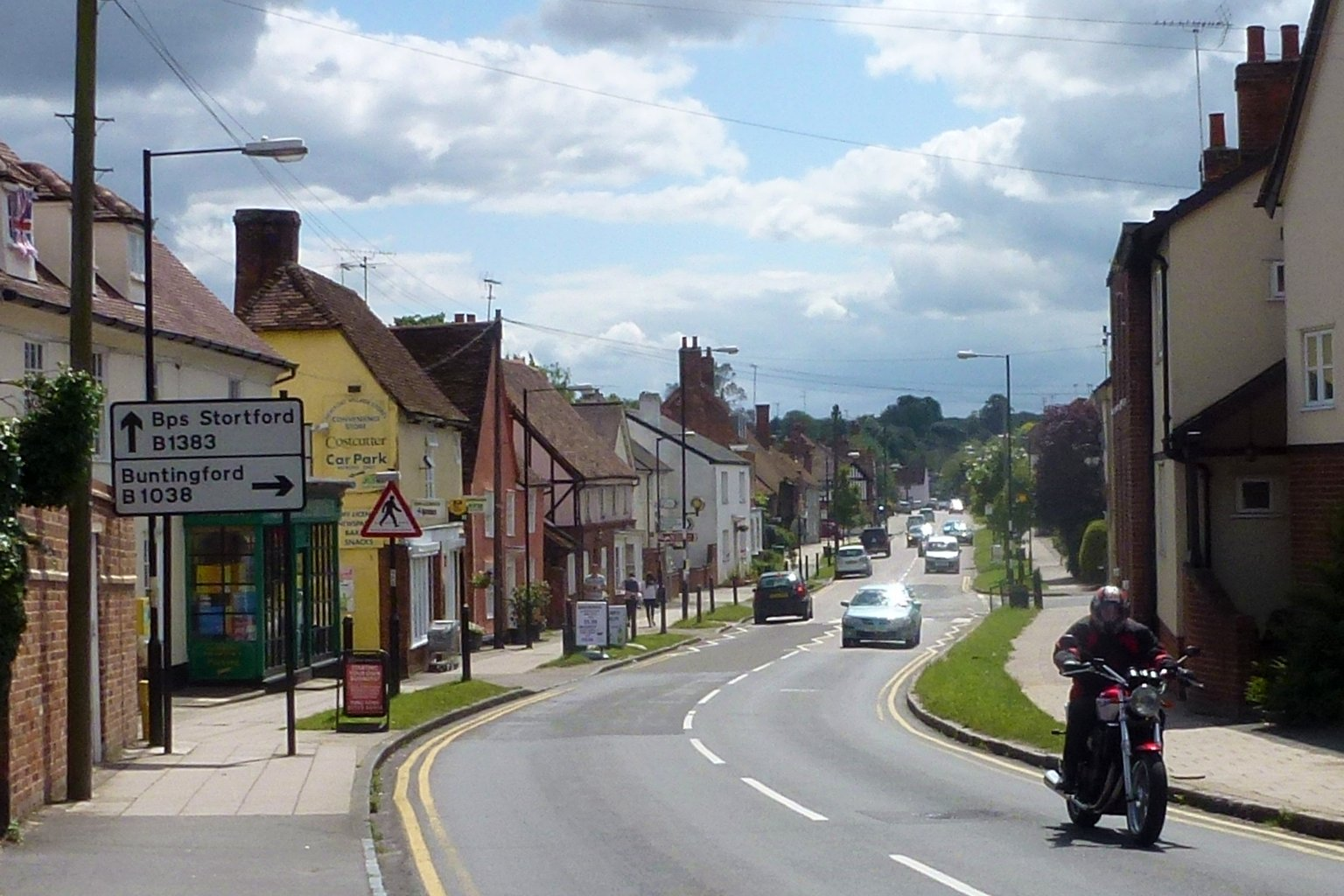
Newport high street in July 2012

Newport is a village and civil parish in the Uttlesford district of Essex, England. It lies 3 miles (5 km) south-west of Saffron Walden, its post town. At the 2021 census the parish had a population of 2,936.

Located approximately 41 miles (66 kilometres) north of London, the village is situated amongst the arable fields of northern Essex. With a regular train service to London Liverpool Street and Cambridge from the Newport (Essex) railway station, the village is considered to be within commuting distance of the capital and as such attracts a number of workers from the City of London. Joyce Frankland Academy, a comprehensive co-educational secondary school, is also located in the village.

Newport is the centre point of the long-distance path known as the Harcamlow Way, a figure-of-eight walk between Cambridge and Harlow. Consequently, it has a large number of walks radiating from its centre; short walks of surrounding interest include those heading towards Saffron Walden, the English Heritage property of Audley End House, or Prior Hall Barn in Widdington.

== History ==
A settlement may have existed here under the name Wigingamere which King Edward the Elder, engaged in the reconquest of the Danelaw, ordered to be refortified in 921 (or possibly 917). However, the author of the paper that associated Wigingamere with Newport wrote a subsequent paper in which he indicated that this idea was "no longer tenable."

The earliest mention of Newport is in 1086 in the Domesday Book, in the hundred of Uttlesford. The name is thought to be of Anglo-Saxon origin and is thought to mean new town or market, rather than a modern-day seaport. "Port" was often a name for a market in Saxon times, and Newport did have a flourishing market in this period.

The village prospered until around 1300, after which it declined and its market ceased; it was overtaken in importance by the neighbouring town of Chipping Walden (known today as Saffron Walden). Newport used to contain a very large royal fish pond and hence was known as Newport Pond, but the pond had dried up by the 16th century and that name has fallen into disuse. Its namesake is 25 acre Newport Pond, located beside Tracy Road (Route 6) west of Witherbee in Essex County, New York.

Until the 20th century Newport was mostly dependent upon agriculture in addition to local trade of leather, woolcombing and in later years, malting.

There are many attractive old buildings in the village, a characteristic of the area. The church, St Mary the Virgin, dates from the late 14th century. Perhaps the two most interesting other buildings are The Crown House (mostly late 16th century), and Monks Barn, a Wealden type house dating from the 15th century.

In 1588 Newport Free Grammar School was founded by Dame Joyce Frankland; although it retained its name it began to take boys of all abilities in 1976, but is now called Joyce Frankland Academy and is fully comprehensive as well as co-educational. The village also has its own primary school.

In 1660, diarist, Samuel Pepys stayed overnight, whilst visiting Lord Braybrooke at Audley End House.

On the creation of a turnpike trust in 1744 the main road was greatly improved. This brought new people and new trade to the village, as did the arrival of the railway in 1845.

The greatest changes have occurred recently. One hundred years ago about 900 people, largely agricultural workers, lived in some 220 dwellings. By 1971 the population had increased somewhat to over 1,200. Since then all the livestock farms have closed, fields, orchards and farm premises in the centre of the village have been built over, and more than 2,200 people now occupy over 900 houses.

== Governance ==
An electoral ward in the same name exists. The population of this ward at the 2011 census was 3,443.

== Entertainment ==
The village has two public houses: the Coach and Horses, a large 17th-century inn situated at the north end of the village, and the White Horse, an equally old but smaller pub in the centre of the village. There is also a social members club, the Newport Club.

Newport is home to a tennis club and youth organisations and benefits from the Village Hall where activities include a farmers' market, bingo, keep fit, Pilates, the Footlight Theatre Dance School, Newport Amateur Theatrical Society, Newport Art Group, and Saffron Walden Indoor Carpet Bowls Club.

Newport has a village magazine, Newport News, which is published twice a year and hosts a bonfire night firework display on 5 November each year.

== Local businesses ==
Newport is served by a handful of small businesses, such as a small independent petrol station and garage, a chemist, an Indian restaurant, a convenience store and post office. There is also a small garden centre, beauty salon, gentleman's hairdressers and a bakery.

== Famous inhabitants ==
The seventeenth-century writer of books on cookery and household management, Hannah Woolley, lived here as wife of the school master around 1646.

Chef Jamie Oliver went to Newport Free Grammar School and lives in a village nearby. His parents owned a pub called The Cricketers in the nearby village of Clavering but sold it on retirement in October 2020. The professional footballer Matt Holland attended the same school, as did Martin Caton MP, and (albeit briefly) Adam Ant.

"Tex" Banwell, a British soldier who escaped POW camps at least twice, impersonated Monty, joined the Dutch resistance and was finally imprisoned in Auschwitz, was born in the town in 1917 and lived here as a toddler.

Influencer, film critic and photographer Thomas Duke hails from the town.

== See also ==
- The Hundred Parishes
- The Nightingale Baronetcy of Newport Pond

Nurse, B. et alA village in time; the history of Newport, Essex; Newport, Newport News, 1995
