= West Essex =

- Proposed unitary authority area
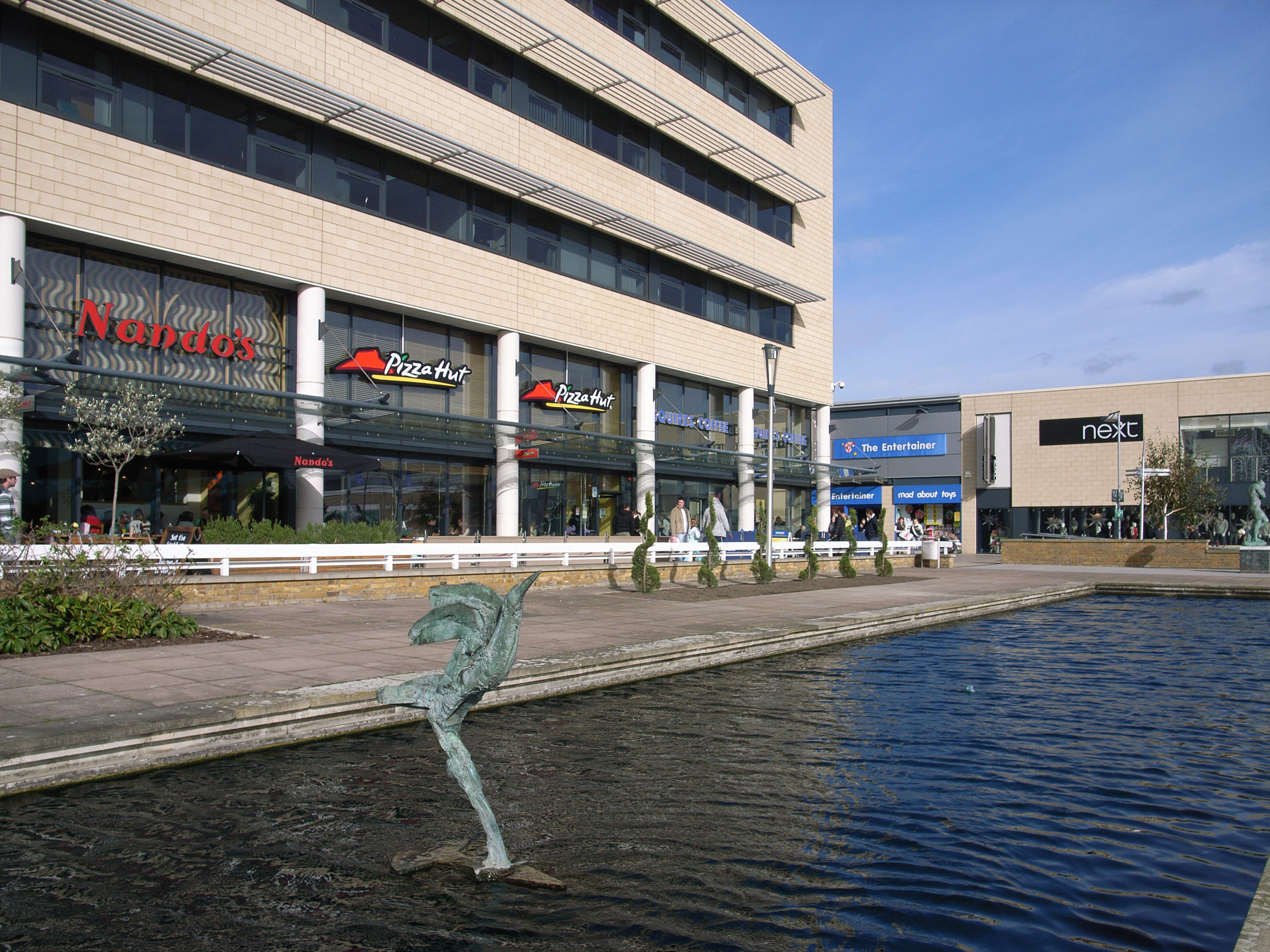
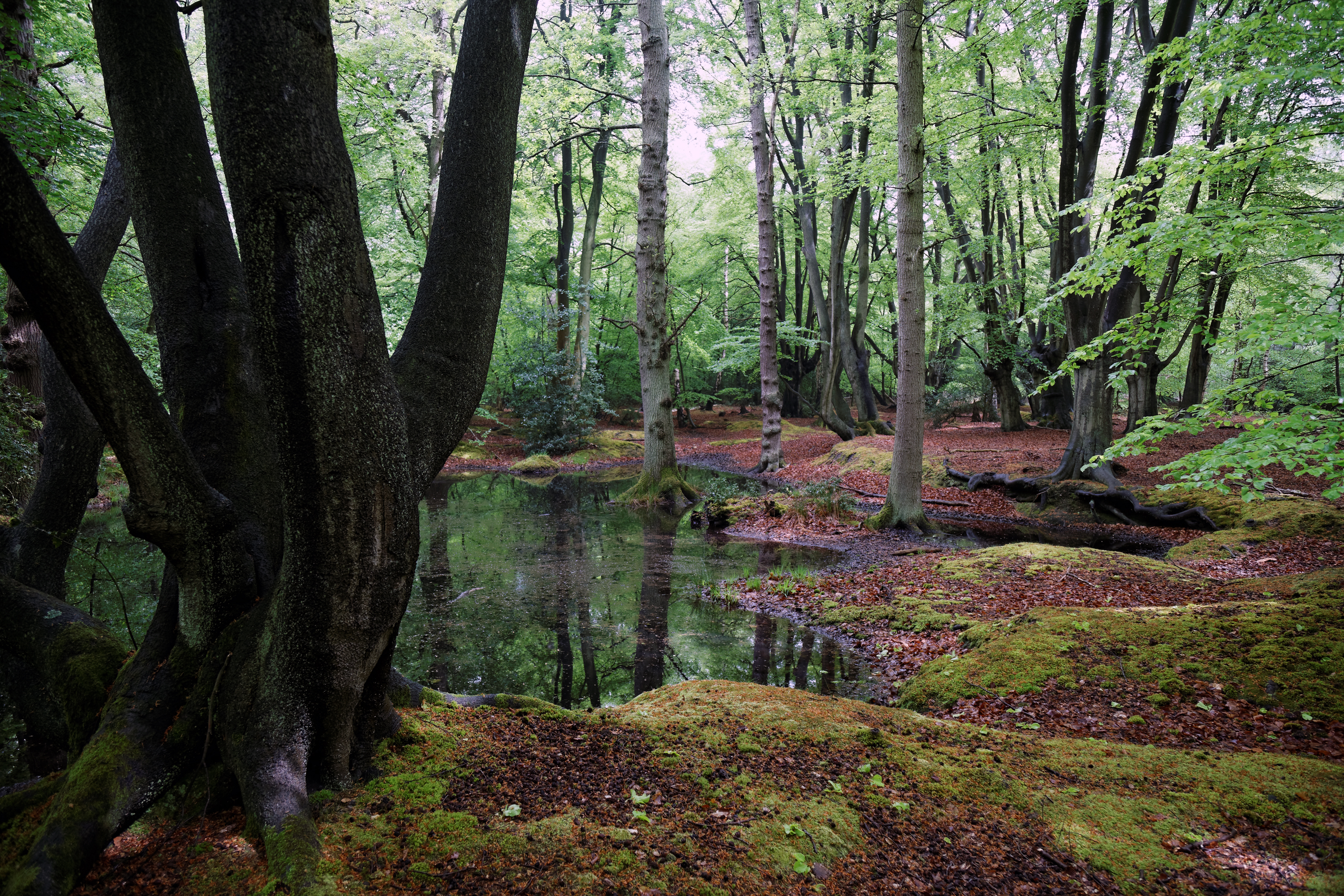
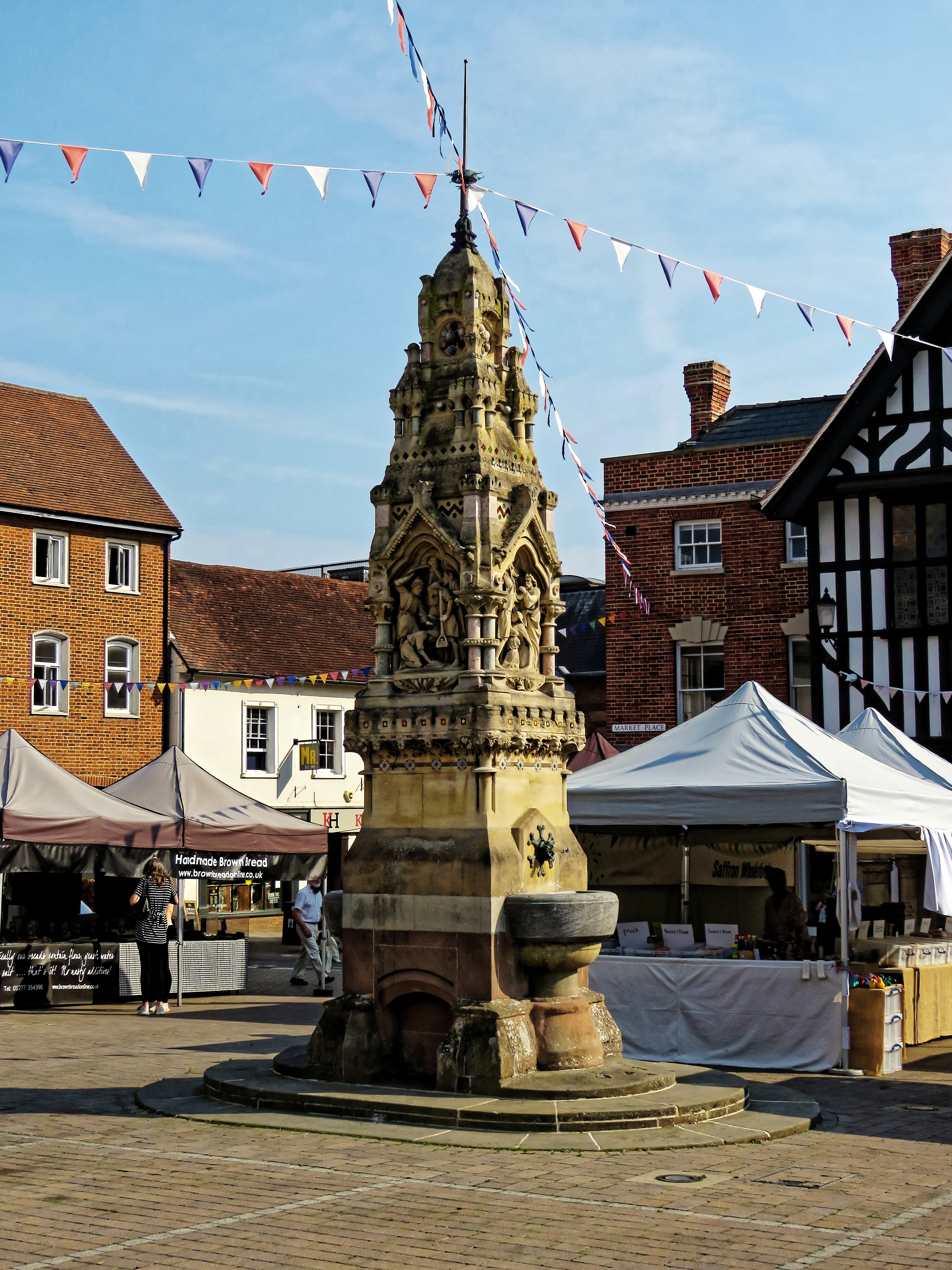
- Harlow, Epping Forest and Saffron Walden

- West Essex shown within Essex
- Interactive map of West Essex
- Coordinates: 51.779°N 0.128°E
- Sovereign state: United Kingdom
- Country: England
- Region: East
- Ceremonial county: Essex

Government
  - Type: Unitary authority
  - Body: West Essex Council

Area
  - Total: 390.2 sq mi (1,010.7 km^{2})

Population (2024 estimate)
  - Total: 330,792
  - Density: 847.68/sq mi (327.29/km^{2})
- Time zone: UTC+0 (GMT)
  - Summer (DST): UTC+1 (BST)

West Essex was a proposed unitary authority area scheduled to be created in April 2028 in Essex, England. As part of an ongoing local government reorganisation, it was intended to be formed from the three existing districts of Epping Forest, Harlow and Uttlesford. The first councillors to West Essex Council would have been elected in May 2027. The largest settlement in the district would have been Harlow. Plans to create it were withdrawn in September 2026.

== History ==
In February 2025, Essex was accepted into the Devolution Priority Programme. Tied to this, councils were invited to submit proposals for the reorganisation of local government districts by September 2025. The government held statutory consultations from November 2025 to January 2026 and made a decision in March 2026. In West Essex, it was decided to create a new unitary authority district by combining Epping Forest, Harlow and Uttlesford.

In September 2026, the Essex proposals were withdrawn by the government in light of new legal advice. In September 2026, the Essex proposals were withdrawn by the government in light of new legal advice. The decision was threatened with judicial review by Essex County Council.

== Geography ==
The largest settlement in the district would have been the new town of Harlow. The Office for National Statistics mid-2023 population estimate of the district was 325,609.

=== Parishes ===
Harlow is unparished and all of the rest of the area is made of civil parishes.

- Abbess Beauchamp and Berners Roding, Arkesden, Ashdon, Aythorpe Roding
- Barnston, Berden, Birchanger, Bobbingworth, Broxted, Buckhurst Hill
- Chickney, Chigwell, Chrishall, Clavering
- Debden
- Elmdon, Elsenham, Epping, Epping Upland
- Farnham, Felsted, Flitch Green, Fyfield
- Great Canfield, Great Chesterford, Great Dunmow, Great Easton, Great Hallingbury, Great Sampford
- Hadstock, Hatfield Broad Oak, Hatfield Heath, Hempstead, Henham, High Easter, High Laver, High Ongar, High Roding
- Lambourne, Langley, Leaden Roding, Lindsell, Little Bardfield, Little Canfield, Little Chesterford, Little Dunmow, Little Easton, Little Hallingbury, Little Laver, Little Sampford, Littlebury, Loughton
- Magdalen Laver, Manuden, Margaret Roding, Matching, Moreton
- Nazeing, Newport, North Weald Bassett
- Ongar
- Quendon and Rickling
- Radwinter, Roydon
- Saffron Walden, Sewards End, Sheering, Stanford Rivers, Stansted Mountfitchet, Stapleford Abbotts, Stapleford Tawney, Stebbing, Strethall
- Takeley, Thaxted, Theydon Bois, Theydon Garnon, Theydon Mount, Tilty
- Ugley
- Waltham Abbey, Wenden Lofts, Wendens Ambo, White Roding, Wicken Bonhunt, Widdington, Willingale, Wimbish

== Governance ==
The local authority would have been West Essex Council. The first councillors would have been elected in May 2027. This election was cancelled in September 2026.
