= West Essex (disambiguation) =

West Essex is an English unitary authority area.

West Essex may also refer to the following geographical areas:

== England ==
- West Essex (UK Parliament constituency), 1868–1885
- western parts of the early medieval Kingdom of Essex
- western parts of the modern county of Essex

== Canada ==
- Essex West (electoral district), Ontario

== United States ==
- West Essex, New Jersey, the western part of Essex County

== See also ==
- Wessex
- Wessex culture
