= The Hundred Parishes =

Area of eastern England

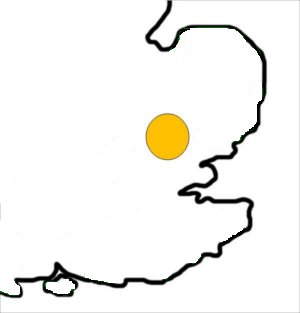
Approximate location and scale of the Hundred Parishes within the East of England.

The Hundred Parishes - indicative places within the area are shown in BOLD.

The Hundred Parishes is a cultural heritage initiative focused on an area in the East of England recognized for its high concentration of cultural and historical significance. Although without formal recognition or status, the concept has the blessing of county and district authorities. It encompasses around 450 square miles (1,100 square kilometres) of northwest Essex, northeast Hertfordshire and southern Cambridgeshire. The area comprises just over 100 administrative parishes, hence its name. It contains over 6,000 listed buildings and many conservation areas, village greens, ancient hedgerows, protected features and a historical pattern of small rural settlements in close proximity to one another.

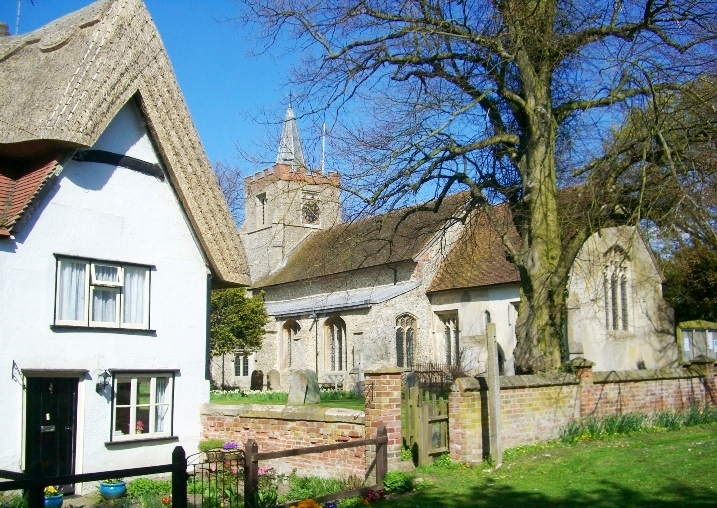
Henham, Essex

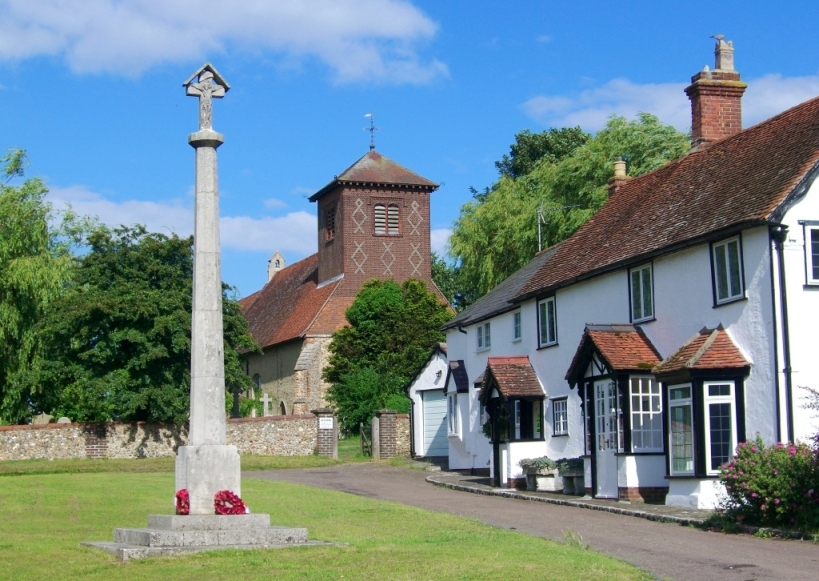
Great Easton, Essex

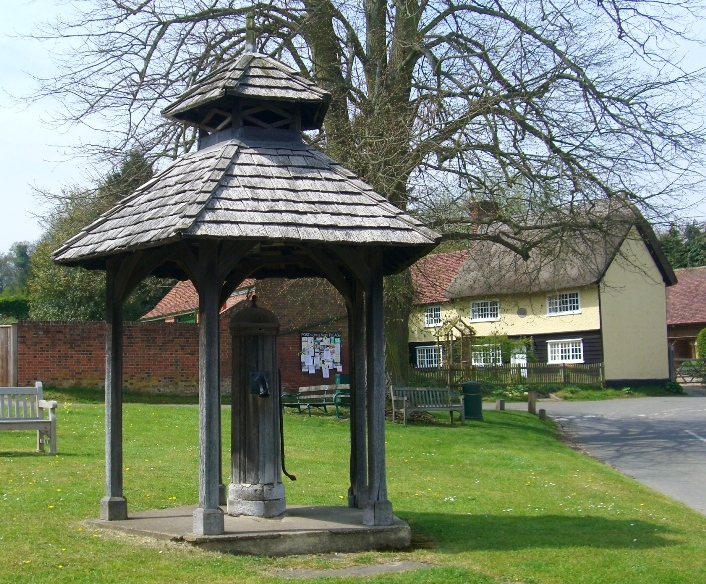
Westmill, Hertfordshire

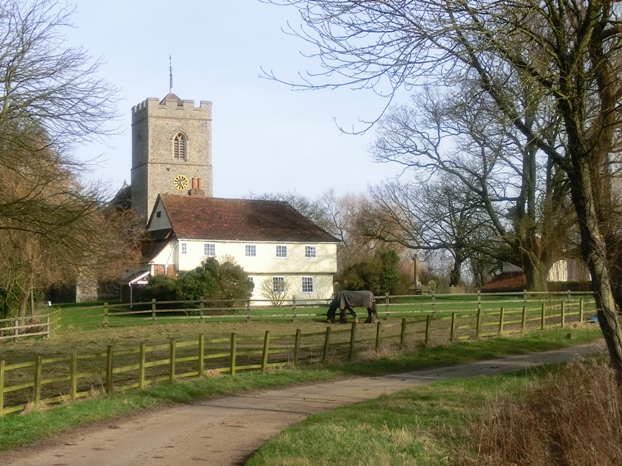
Matching, Essex - Church and wedding feast room

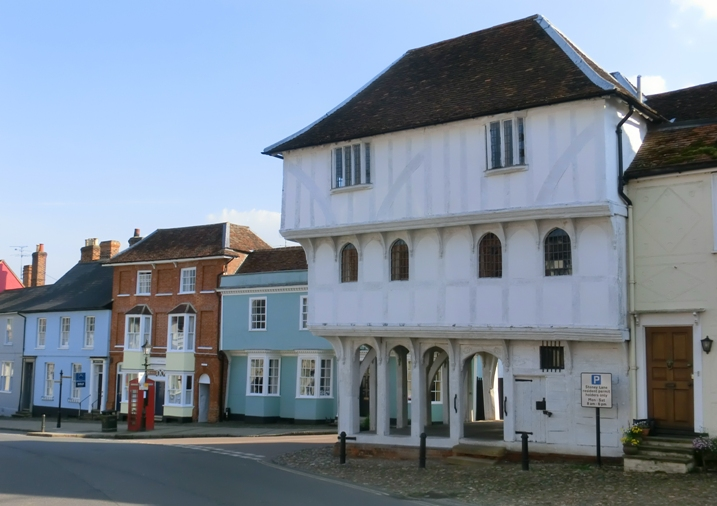
Thaxted, Essex - the Guildhall.

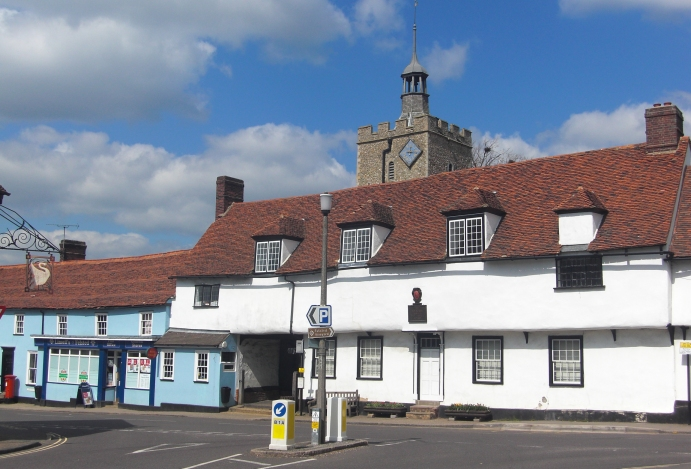
Felsted, Essex

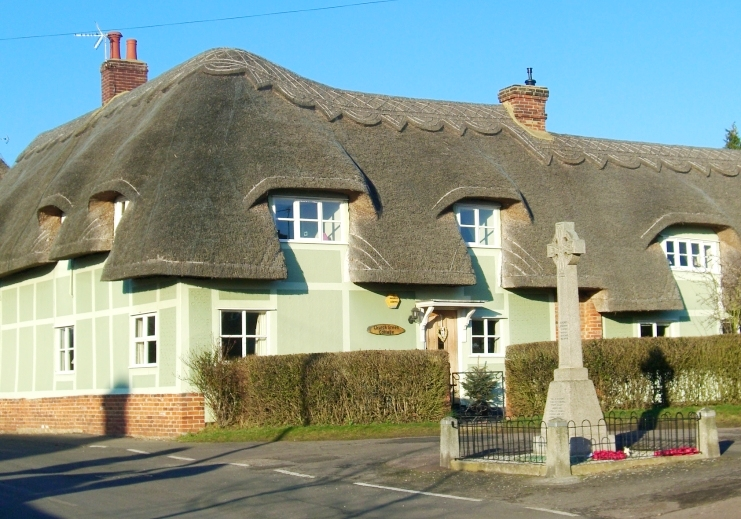
Hinxton, Cambridgeshire

== Origins ==
The idea of recognising the area for its special heritage characteristics was originally conceived by local historian and author David Heathcote. A steering group of local historians, conservationists and a local authority representative progressed the idea and defined a boundary. The name arose in response to the fact that the defined area covered just over 100 administrative parishes. The initiative steadily gained support and the Hundred Parishes name was approved in 2012 at a constitutional conference to which all local authorities and many other local organisations were invited. The conference was attended by delegates from more than 30 authorities and organisations and The Hundred Parishes Society was established as a company limited by guarantee immediately afterwards.

== The Hundred Parishes Society ==
This society was formed to raise public consciousness of the area and to encourage preservation of the area's special characteristics. It was formed in 2012 and launched to the general public in 2014 after being registered by the Charity Commission. Its website www.hundredparishes.org.uk includes introductions to each of the area's 103 administrative parishes and to a number of notable people associated with the area, as well as a wide range of articles about the area and an extensive series of walk routes which website visitors are encouraged to download at no cost: each parish is included in at least one route. Some routes start and finish at railway stations and others are "quiet lane walks" avoiding footpaths. Membership of the Society is open to households and organisations and includes a growing number of parish councils.

In 2018 the Society published the first book to focus on the area, The Hundred Parishes: An Introduction (ISBN 978-1-5272-1881-9). This hardback book comprises 432 pages and includes almost a thousand photos. The text and photos focus on the area's history and extensive heritage. The book was well received and is now out of print, although copies are available through libraries.

== Geography ==
The Hundred Parishes is at its highest in the chalk hills in the northwest of the area, generally sloping down towards the southeast. The whole area lies between 100 and 500 feet (30 and 150 metres) above sea level.

There are no major rivers but the many small ones follow valleys that give the area its attractive, gentle landscape. In the west, the rivers Rib, Ash and Stort flow south from the Hundred Parishes to meet the Lea and then the Thames. In the east, the Chelmer and Pant flow from the Hundred Parishes into the Blackwater and then the North Sea. The Cam flows northwards through the middle of the northern half of the Hundred Parishes, gathering up the Granta and Rhee before leaving the Hundred Parishes bound for Cambridge and the North Sea. And in the south, the Roding, which gives its name to several villages in the Hundred Parishes, flows south to meet the Thames at Barking Creek.

== Features and attractions ==
Many of the area's individual parishes appear in the Domesday Book of 1086, and there is considerable evidence of earlier settlements. Relics from the Iron Age and Bronze Age have been found in a number of locations. Roman roads including Stane Street and Ermine Street cross the Hundred Parishes. An ancient long-distance trackway, the Icknield Way, which may pre-date the Roman roads, passes from west to east through the northern part of the area.

Saffron Walden is the area's largest settlement, with a population of 17,000 in 2021. It has been a market town since the 12th century. There are three more market towns: Buntingford, Great Dunmow and Thaxted. Most of the area's villages have a historical church, a pub and a village green, and most are within easy walking distance of the next settlement.

Individual visitor attractions include Audley End House, a Jacobean mansion now cared for by English Heritage, and Hatfield Forest, a medieval royal hunting forest now within the care of the National Trust. The area has several small museums and galleries.

== Architecture ==
The Hundred Parishes has over 6,000 listed buildings, an especially high number for its population of around 150,000 – around 5 times the average ratio of listings to population for England as a whole. Of these listings, 106 are Grade I, including 60 churches.

Typical architectural features include timber-framed buildings, flint (especially for churches), thatched roofs, whitewashing and/or pargeting on external walls.

== Cultural heritage ==
The Hundred Parishes has a strong cultural heritage from the 20th century when it was the home of, among others, Gustav Holst, H. G. Wells, Henry Moore and the Great Bardfield artists including Eric Ravilious and Edward Bawden. Henry Moore's home and studio in Perry Green is open to the public. The artists are particularly celebrated at the Fry Art Gallery in Saffron Walden and Thaxted hosts annual festivals of classical music and Morris dancing.

== The parishes ==
Albury, Anstey, Arkesden, Ashdon, Aspenden, Aythorpe Roding, Barkway, Barley, Barnston, Bartlow, Berden, Birchanger, Braughing, Brent Pelham & Meesden, Broxted, Buntingford, Castle Camps, Chickney, Chrishall, Clavering, Debden, Duxford, Eastwick & Gilston, Elmdon & Wenden Lofts, Elsenham, Farnham, Felsted, Finchingfield, Flitch Green, Furneux Pelham, Great & Little Chishill, Great Amwell, Great Bardfield, Great Canfield, Great Chesterford, Great Dunmow, Great Easton & Tilty, Great Hallingbury, Great Waltham, Hadstock, Hatfield Broad Oak, Hatfield Heath, Helions Bumpstead, Hempstead, Henham, Heydon, High Easter, High Roding, High Wych, Hildersham, Hinxton, Hormead, Hunsdon, Ickleton, Langley, Leaden Roding, Lindsell, Linton, Little Bardfield, Little Canfield, Little Chesterford, Little Dunmow, Little Easton, Little Hadham, Little Hallingbury, Littlebury, Manuden, Matching, Much Hadham, Newport, Nuthampstead, Pleshey, Quendon & Rickling, Radwinter, Saffron Walden, The Salings (formerly Bardfield Saling and Great Saling), The Sampfords, Sawbridgeworth, Sewards End, Shalford, Sheering, Standon, Stanstead Abbotts, Stansted Mountfitchet, Stebbing, Steeple Bumpstead, Stocking Pelham, Strethall, Takeley, Thaxted, Thorley, Thundridge, Ugley, Wareside, Wendens Ambo, Westmill, Wethersfield, White Roding, Wicken Bonhunt, Widdington, Widford, Wimbish, Wyddial.
