= John Joscelyn =

16th-century English writer and antiquarian

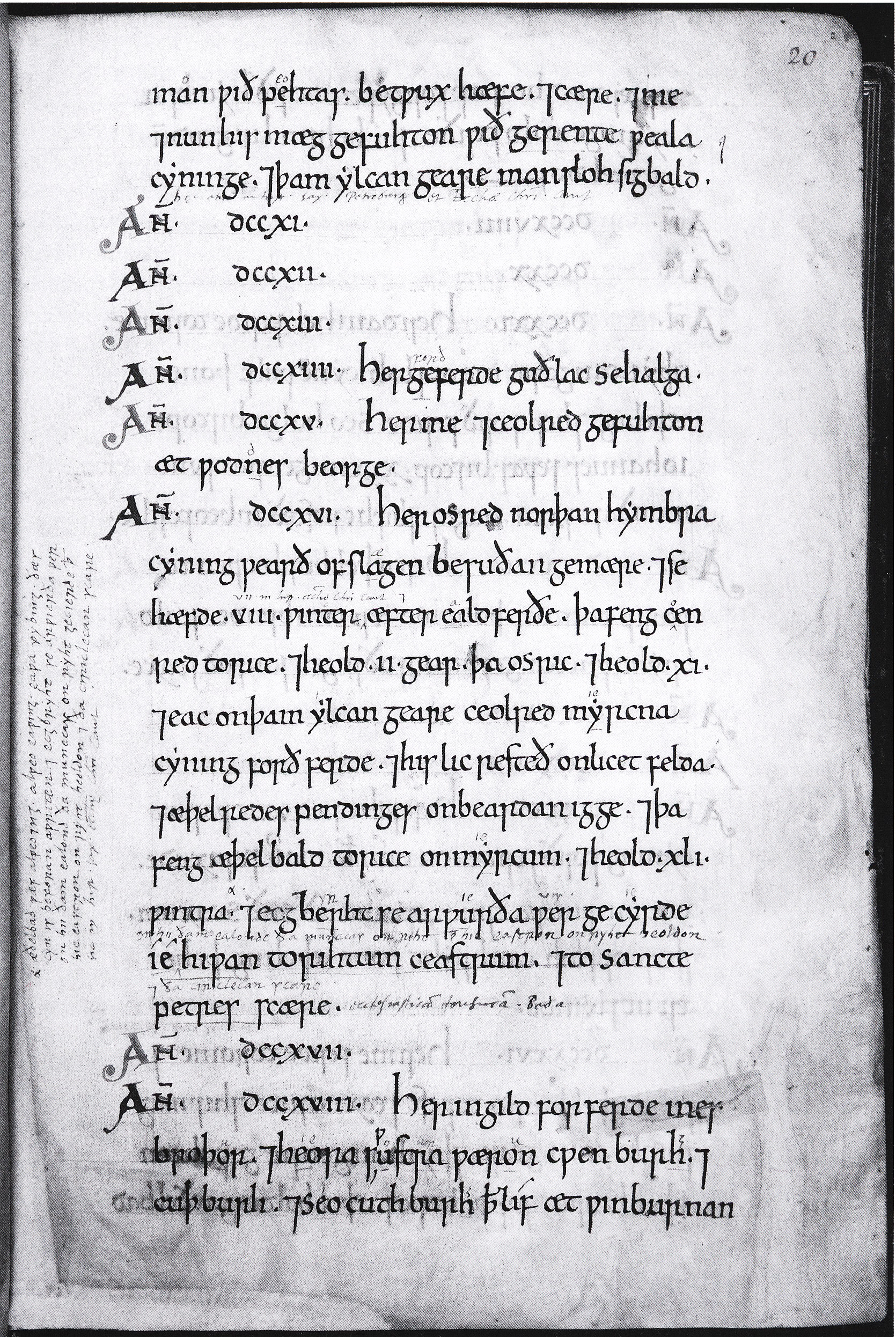
- A page from the D manuscript of the Anglo-Saxon Chronicle, annotated by Joscelyn
- Born: 1529 probably High Roding, Essex
- Died: 28 December 1603 (aged 73–74) probably High Roding, Essex
- Resting place: All Saints' Church, High Roding
- Education: Master of Arts
- Alma mater: Queens' College, Cambridge
- Occupations: Clergyman, secretary
- Writing career
- Period: Elizabethan England
- Genres: historian, antiquarian

John Joscelyn, also John Jocelyn or John Joscelin, (1529–1603) was an English clergyman and antiquarian as well as secretary to Matthew Parker, an Archbishop of Canterbury during the reign of Queen Elizabeth I. Joscelyn was involved in Parker's attempts to secure and publish medieval manuscripts on church history, and was one of the first scholars of the Old English (Anglo-Saxon) language. He also studied the early law codes of England. His Old English dictionary, although not published during his lifetime, contributed greatly to the study of that language. Many of his manuscripts and papers eventually became part of the collections of Cambridge University, Oxford University, or the British Library.

== Early life ==
Joscelyn was born in 1529, and was the son of Thomas Joscelin and Dorothy Gate. John was their third son to survive childhood, and was probably born on his father's estate at High Roding, Essex. He matriculated as a pensioner at Queens' College at Cambridge in 1545, attaining a Bachelor of Arts in 1549. In the academic year 1550–1551 he taught Latin at Queens' College, and the following school year he taught Greek. At the end of 1552, he was awarded a Master of Arts. In 1555, during Queen Mary I's reign, Joscelyn subscribed to the required church doctrine, and was once more a teacher of Greek during the academic year 1556–1557. However, in 1557 he resigned from his fellowship at Queens'.

== Work for Parker ==
In 1559, shortly after he was appointed as archbishop, Matthew Parker, the Archbishop of Canterbury, named Joscelyn to a chaplaincy, and also as his Latin language secretary. The following year Parker gave Joscelyn a prebend at Hereford Cathedral, held until 1578. Unusually for the time, besides Greek and Latin Joscelyn was a scholar of Hebrew. From Parker's interest in the history of early Christianity, and to discover more information about the growth of papal power in the Middle Ages, Joscelyn also began to study Old English (a topic of interest to Parker), and helped the archbishop in his studies of the English pre-Norman Conquest church. Joscelyn helped discover lost manuscripts, obtained them for Parker, and prepared them for publication. Joscelyn also acquired manuscripts for himself, 40 of which were written in Old English.

Joseclyn often annotated the manuscripts he or Parker owned, and even inserted some pages of faked script into the D manuscript of the Anglo-Saxon Chronicle, and probably owned that manuscript prior to Robert Cotton. His glosses are still extant on several dozen manuscripts, usually in Latin, but occasionally in English. He was, however, also concerned that their collections be properly cared for. He had a good understanding of the law codes of the English Anglo-Saxon kings, which he used in the preparation of an Old English-Latin dictionary he worked on, but which was never completed. The dictionary was, however, of great help to later Old English scholars, as it passed into the hands of Robert Cotton, and became part of the Cotton library as manuscripts Titus A xv and Titus A xvi. Joscelyn's written work on Old English grammar also became part of the Cotton library, but was lost after Cotton loaned the manuscript to William Camden in 1612.

Parker published in 1572 a work entitled De Antiquitate Britannicae Ecclesiae & Priuilegiis Ecclesiae Cantuariensis, cum Archiepiscopis eiusdem 70, which is the first privately printed work to appear in English. Although Parker claimed in a letter that he was the author, it is likely that at the very least Joscelyn did most of the research, and the manuscript of the work, which is now Vitellius E xiv, is largely in his handwriting. Further, Parker's son, after the archbishop's death, noted beside the bequest notation for Joscelyn's brother Thomas that John Joscelyn was the author of the work.

In 1569, Parker gave Joscelyn a rectory at Hollingbourne, Kent which he held until his death.

== Legacy and death ==
Joscelyn also published an edition of Gildas' work De Excidio et Conquestu Britanniae in 1568, for which he wrote the preface. He also wrote a history of Corpus Christi College, Cambridge Historiola Collegii Corporis Christi that remained unpublished until 1880. He contributed extensively to Parker's A Testimonie of Antiquitie Shewing the Auncient Fayth in the Church of England, the earliest printed book containing portions in Old English. Joscelyn also contributed a large part of Parker's De Antiquitate Britannicae, published in 1572.

Joscelyn died on 28 December 1603, probably at High Roding, and was buried in All Saints' Church in High Roding where the inscription of his memorial brass survives. He never married.

Joscelyn's contributions to the study of Old English have been called "a significant contribution to the development of the study of the language". The historian May McKisack called him a "man of great learning and a good servant to his master". Besides his dictionary and grammar, his working notebook also became part of the Cotton library, now manuscript Vitellius D.vii. Other of his manuscripts, either written or acquired by him, were either given to Corpus Christi College by Parker's heirs, or became parts of the British Library or the Bodleian Library.
