= Blake End =

Hamlet in Essex, England

Coordinates: 51.878°N 0.472°E

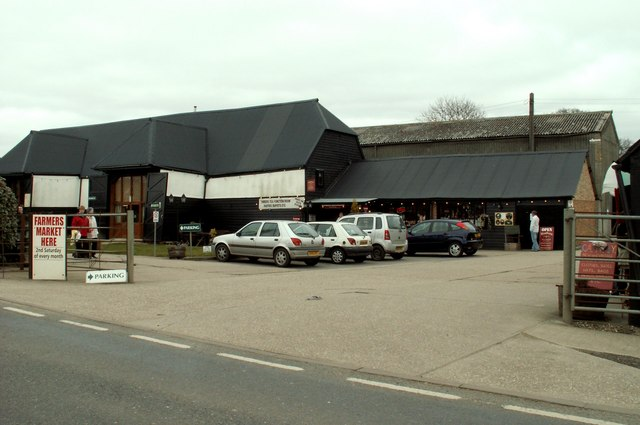
- Craft Centre at Blake End

- Location within Essex
- Civil parish: The Salings
- District: Braintree
- Shire county: Essex
- Region: East
- Country: England
- Sovereign state: United Kingdom
- Police: Essex
- Fire: Essex
- Ambulance: East of England

Blake End is a hamlet on the B1256 road in the civil parish of The Salings, in the Braintree district of Essex, England. The hamlet is situated between the towns of Braintree and Great Dunmow. Nearby settlements include the parish village of Great Saling and the hamlet of Gransmore Green.
