= Listed buildings in The Salings =

Civil Parish in Essex, England

The Salings is a village and civil parish in the Braintree District of Essex, England. It contains 69 listed buildings that are recorded in the National Heritage List for England. Of these one is grade I, three are grade II* and 65 are grade II.

This list is based on the information retrieved online from Historic England.

== Key ==
Grade	Criteria
I	Buildings that are of exceptional interest
II*	Particularly important buildings of more than special interest
II	Buildings that are of special interest

== Listing ==
Name	Grade	Location	Type	Completed (Note: The date given is the date used by Historic England as significant for the initial building or that of an important part in the structure's description.)	Date designated	Grid ref. (Note: The grid reference is based on the British national grid reference system, sometimes known as OSGB36, used by the Ordnance Survey.) Geo-coordinates	Notes	Entry number (Note: The "List Entry Number" is a unique number assigned to each listed building and scheduled monument by Historic England.)	Image	Wikidata
Barn Approximately 30 Metres South East of Betts Farmhouse	II				2 January 1985	TL6908125350; 51°54′04″N 0°27′22″E		1122837	Upload Photo	Q26415948
Barn Approximately 40 Metres North East of Purples Farmhouse	II	Bardfield Road			2 January 1985	TL6952927809; 51°55′23″N 0°27′50″E		1338105	Upload Photo	Q26622451
Barn Approximately 50 Metres North of Boarded Barns Farmhouse	II	Bardfield Road			2 January 1985	TL6981227045; 51°54′58″N 0°28′04″E		1146829	Upload Photo	Q26439929
Four Elms Cottage	II	Bardfield Road			2 January 1985	TL6951727464; 51°55′12″N 0°27′49″E		1122834	Upload Photo	Q26415945
Purples Farmhouse	II	Bardfield Road			2 January 1985	TL6949827766; 51°55′21″N 0°27′48″E		1308797	Upload Photo	Q26595360
Barn Approximately 35 Metres West of Parks' Farmhouse	II	Blake End			2 January 1985	TL7072624717; 51°53′41″N 0°28′47″E		1122780	Upload Photo	Q26415895
Barn Approximately 60 Metres South East of Blake House Farmhouse	II	Blake End			1 June 1983	TL7023423245; 51°52′54″N 0°28′19″E		1365607	Upload Photo	Q26647280
Blake House Farmhouse	II	Blake End			2 January 1985	TL7018523286; 51°52′56″N 0°28′16″E		1122781	Upload Photo	Q26415896
Cartlodge Approximately 100 Metres South East of Blake House Farmhouse	II	Blake End			1 June 1983	TL7024523203; 51°52′53″N 0°28′19″E		1122782	Upload Photo	Q26415897
Cartlodge Approximately 35 Metres South West of Parks' Farmhouse	II	Blake End			2 January 1985	TL7074324674; 51°53′40″N 0°28′48″E		1338120	Upload Photo	Q26622467
Farm Outbuilding Range Approximately 15 Metres South of Blake House Farmhouse	II	Blake End			2 January 1985	TL7021623268; 51°52′55″N 0°28′18″E		1238998	Upload Photo	Q26532020
Farm Outbuilding Range Approximately 20 Metres South West of Blake House Farmhouse and Adjoining the Road	II	Blake End			1 June 1983	TL7021923224; 51°52′54″N 0°28′18″E		1365611	Upload Photo	Q26647284
Iron Railings Enclosing Front Garden of Blake House Farmhouse	II	Blake End			2 January 1985	TL7017423276; 51°52′55″N 0°28′16″E		1338121	Upload Photo	Q26622468
Onchor's Farmhouse	II	Blake End			2 January 1985	TL7028824517; 51°53′35″N 0°28′24″E		1122779	Upload Photo	Q26415894
Park's Farmhouse	II	Blake End			2 January 1985	TL7077324716; 51°53′41″N 0°28′50″E		1338119	Upload Photo	Q26622466
Taborsfield Cottages	II	1 and 2, Crow's Green			2 January 1985	TL6946725771; 51°54′17″N 0°27′43″E		1338107	Upload Photo	Q26622453
Bett's Farmhouse	II	Crow's Green			2 January 1985	TL6904725356; 51°54′04″N 0°27′21″E		1308769	Upload Photo	Q26595336
Cartlodge Approximately 30 Metres North East of Bett's Farmhouse and Adjoining Road	II	Crow's Green			2 January 1985	TL6906125392; 51°54′05″N 0°27′21″E		1122836	Upload Photo	Q26415947
Crow's Green Cottage	II	Crow's Green			2 January 1985	TL6903825990; 51°54′24″N 0°27′21″E		1146851	Upload Photo	Q26439949
Granary Approximately 4 Metres South of Bett's Farmhouse	II	Crow's Green			2 January 1985	TL6906225353; 51°54′04″N 0°27′21″E		1146870	Upload Photo	Q26439968
Hitchcock's	II	Crow's Green			2 January 1985	TL6910625850; 51°54′20″N 0°27′25″E		1122835	Upload Photo	Q26415946
Pump Approximately 9 Metres East of Pump Cottage	II	Crow's Green			2 January 1985	TL6900725946; 51°54′23″N 0°27′20″E		1338106	Upload Photo	Q26622452
Pump Cottage	II	Crow's Green			2 January 1985	TL6899625932; 51°54′23″N 0°27′19″E		1146857	Upload Photo	Q26439955
Elms Farmhouse	II	Elms Lane			2 May 1953	TL6935427215; 51°55′04″N 0°27′40″E		1308775	Upload Photo	Q26595341
Hyde Cottage	II	Hyde Lane			2 January 1985	TL7074926288; 51°54′32″N 0°28′51″E		1122783	Upload Photo	Q26415898
Lower Hyde Bungalow	II	Hyde Lane			2 January 1985	TL7024026385; 51°54′36″N 0°28′25″E		1122784	Upload Photo	Q26415899
Lower Hyde Cottage	II	Hyde Lane			2 January 1985	TL7022526386; 51°54′36″N 0°28′24″E		1122785	Upload Photo	Q26415900
Pump on Roadside Verge Opposite Lower Hyde Bungalow	II	Hyde Lane			2 January 1985	TL7023926371; 51°54′35″N 0°28′25″E		1147303	Upload Photo	Q26440359
Long Green Farmhouse	II	Long Green Lane			2 January 1985	TL6813726480; 51°54′41″N 0°26′35″E		1122839	Upload Photo	Q26415950
March Cottage	II	Long Green Lane			2 January 1985	TL6844726817; 51°54′52″N 0°26′52″E		1146889	Upload Photo	Q26439987
Parsonage Farmhouse	II	Long Green Lane			2 January 1985	TL6843526680; 51°54′47″N 0°26′51″E		1338108	Upload Photo	Q26622454
Thatches	II	Long Green Lane			2 January 1985	TL6842226782; 51°54′51″N 0°26′50″E		1122838	Upload Photo	Q26415949
Barn Approximately 25 Metres South East of New Green Farmhouse	II	New Green			2 January 1985	TL6900627482; 51°55′13″N 0°27′22″E		1122840	Upload Photo	Q26415951
Cottage Adjoining Clyro to the Right (north East)	II	New Green			2 January 1985	TL6854226965; 51°54′57″N 0°26′57″E		1338128	Upload Photo	Q26622475
New Green Farmhouse	II	New Green			2 January 1985	TL6897727477; 51°55′13″N 0°27′21″E		1146927	Upload Photo	Q26440023
Pollard's Farmhouse	II	New Green			2 May 1953	TL6876726943; 51°54′56″N 0°27′09″E		1338129	Upload Photo	Q26622476
Stucleys	II	New Green			2 January 1985	TL6859226994; 51°54′57″N 0°27′00″E		1338109	Upload Photo	Q26622455
The Poplars	II	New Green			2 January 1985	TL6890927306; 51°55′07″N 0°27′17″E		1122799	Upload Photo	Q26415914
Barn Adjoining Road and Approximately 50 Metres North of Piccott's Farmhouse	II*	Piccotts Lane			2 January 1985	TL7083225696; 51°54′13″N 0°28′54″E		1122786	Upload Photo	Q17557187
Byre Approximately 30 Metres East of Piccott's Farmhouse	II	Piccotts Lane			2 January 1985	TL7086825686; 51°54′13″N 0°28′56″E		1308569	Upload Photo	Q26595156
Piccott's Farmhouse	II	Piccotts Lane			2 May 1953	TL7083125696; 51°54′13″N 0°28′54″E		1147307	Upload Photo	Q26440362
Hollytree	II	Plums Lane			2 January 1985	TL6915927501; 51°55′13″N 0°27′30″E		1338130	Upload Photo	Q26622477
Wymers	II	Plums Lane			2 January 1985	TL6909527542; 51°55′15″N 0°27′27″E		1122801	Upload Photo	Q26415916
Yewtree Cottage	II	Plums Lane			2 January 1985	TL6915927558; 51°55′15″N 0°27′30″E		1122800	Upload Photo	Q26415915
Mount's Farmhouse	II	Shalford Road			2 May 1953	TL7143825097; 51°53′53″N 0°29′25″E		1122787	Upload Photo	Q26415901
Arundels	II	The Street			21 December 1967	TL6868026518; 51°54′42″N 0°27′03″E		1122803	Upload Photo	Q26415917
Barn at Rear and Approximately 20 Metres West of Hall Farmhouse	II	The Street			2 January 1985	TL6999625754; 51°54′16″N 0°28′11″E		1338122	Upload Photo	Q26622469
Brick Wall Forming A Walled Garden to West of Saling Hall and Adjoining Churchyard to North	II	The Street			2 January 1985	TL6996425852; 51°54′19″N 0°28′09″E		1122788	Upload Photo	Q26415902
Cartlodge Adjoining Barn Listed 1/120 to North West and Approximately 30 Metres North West of Hall Farmhouse	II	The Street			2 January 1985	TL6997525760; 51°54′16″N 0°28′10″E		1147396	Upload Photo	Q26440434
Church of St James	II*	The Street	church building		21 December 1967	TL6999925805; 51°54′17″N 0°28′11″E		1147381	Church of St James More images	Q17557490
Church of St Peter and St Paul	I	The Street	church building		2 December 1967	TL6861326514; 51°54′42″N 0°27′00″E		1122802	Church of St Peter and St Paul More images	Q17535816
Cobbers	II	The Street			2 January 1985	TL7016525548; 51°54′09″N 0°28′19″E		1308536	Upload Photo	Q26595128
Cottage Now An Outbuilding at Rear of Daybrook and in the Garden of Holly Cottage	II	The Street			2 January 1985	TL7017125568; 51°54′10″N 0°28′20″E		1338123	Upload Photo	Q26622470
Entrance Gateway to Saling Grove North of West Lodge	II	The Street			2 January 1985	TL7008825294; 51°54′01″N 0°28′15″E		1147510	Upload Photo	Q26440532
Hall Farmhouse	II	The Street			2 January 1985	TL7002125748; 51°54′16″N 0°28′12″E		1122789	Upload Photo	Q26415903
Holly Cottage	II	The Street			2 January 1985	TL7015425572; 51°54′10″N 0°28′19″E		1147412	Upload Photo	Q26440447
Lane Cottage	II	The Street			2 January 1985	TL6867226562; 51°54′43″N 0°27′03″E		1338131	Upload Photo	Q26622478
North Lodge	II	The Street, Saling Grove			2 January 1985	TL7020425516; 51°54′08″N 0°28′21″E		1338124	Upload Photo	Q26622471
Saling Grove	II	The Street, CM7 5DP			2 January 1985	TL7024525350; 51°54′02″N 0°28′23″E		1122792	Upload Photo	Q26415906
Saling Hall	II*	The Street	house		2 May 1953	TL6999825856; 51°54′19″N 0°28′11″E		1147360	Saling Hall More images	Q17557483
Saling Stores and Post Office	II	The Street			2 January 1985	TL7014725585; 51°54′10″N 0°28′18″E		1122791	Upload Photo	Q26415905
Stable and Carriage House to Rear of North Lodge	II	The Street, Saling Grove			2 January 1985	TL7023225524; 51°54′08″N 0°28′23″E		1308517	Upload Photo	Q26595113
Stable and Outbuildings to Rear of Stable and Carriage House	II	The Street, Saling Grove			2 January 1985	TL7024525536; 51°54′08″N 0°28′24″E		1122793	Upload Photo	Q26415907
The White Hart Inn	II	The Street	pub		2 January 1985	TL7015025482; 51°54′07″N 0°28′18″E		1122790	The White Hart Inn More images	Q26415904
Three Pins	II	The Street			23 February 1981	TL7012125431; 51°54′05″N 0°28′17″E		1308561	Upload Photo	Q26595149
Walls and Railings Attached to North Lodge and Stable Buildings	II	The Street, Saling Grove			2 January 1985	TL7026225550; 51°54′09″N 0°28′24″E		1308526	Upload Photo	Q26595121
West Lodge and Attached Iron Railings and Gate	II	The Street, Saling Grove			2 January 1985	TL7009125283; 51°54′00″N 0°28′15″E		1338125	Upload Photo	Q26622472
April Cottage	II	Woolpits Road			2 January 1985	TL6946125953; 51°54′23″N 0°27′43″E		1122794	Upload Photo	Q26415908
Dovecote Approximately 15 Metres East of Woolpits Farmhouse	II	Woolpits Road			21 December 1967	TL6921126222; 51°54′32″N 0°27′31″E		1338132	Upload Photo	Q26622479

== See also ==
- Grade I listed buildings in Essex
- Grade II* listed buildings in Essex

== Sources ==
- Bettley, James; Pevsner, Nikolaus (2007) [1954], Essex, The Buildings of England, New Haven and London: Yale University Press, ISBN 978-0-300-11614-4
