= Garnetts Wood and Barnston Lays =

Protected area in Essex, England

Coordinates: 51.8389°N 0.374°E

- Site of Special Scientific Interest
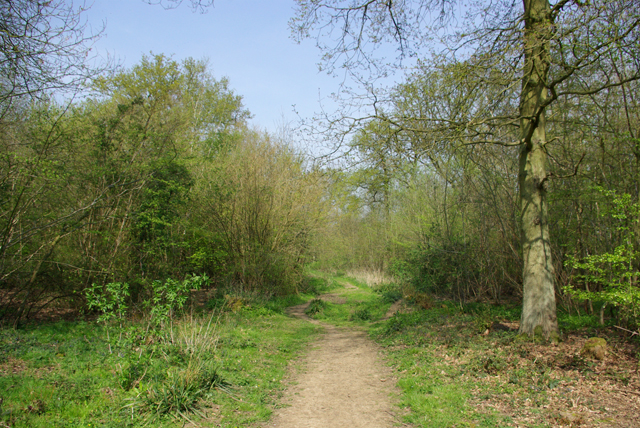
- Garnetts Wood
- Location of Garnetts Wood and Barnston Lays.
- Area of search: Essex
- Grid reference: TL636182
- Interest: Biological
- Area: 25.0 ha (62 acres)
- Notification date: 1985
- Location map: Magic Map

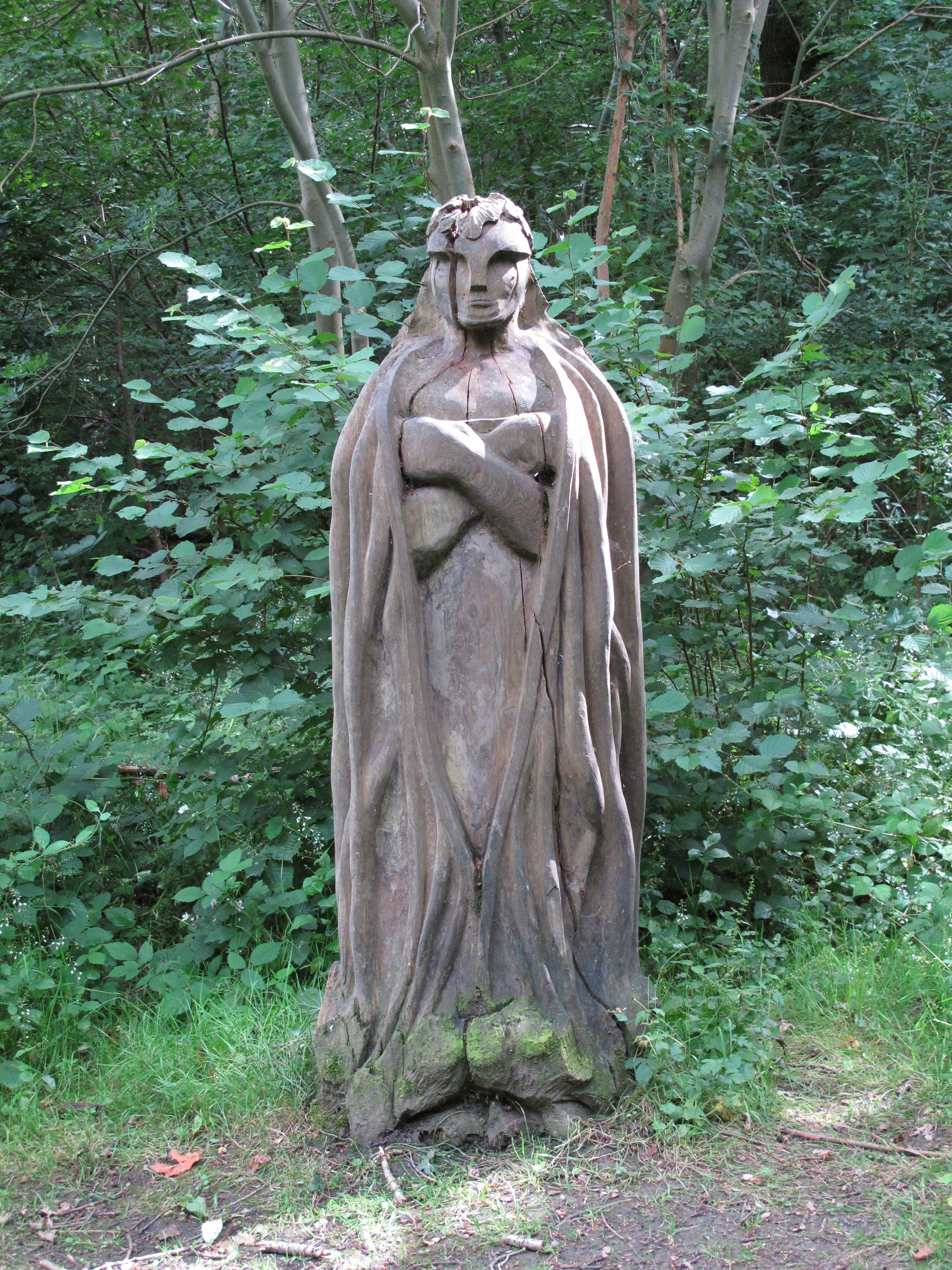
The statue of Mr Garnett in the wood

Garnetts Wood and Barnston Lays is a 25 hectare biological Site of Special Scientific Interest two miles south of Great Dunmow in Essex. It is owned and managed by Essex County Council "for quiet public recreation".

The site is coppiced woodland, mostly ancient, on glacial silt, sands, gravels and clay soils. It contains some of the best lime woodland, which was once widespread but now rare, in the county. The ground flora are mainly brambles and dog's mercury, with some wood sorrel and bluebells. There are two ponds, which have the unusual water purslane. The woodland contains the rare wild service tree (Sorbus torminalis).

There is access from Bishop's Green.

The wood gets its name from the knight Geffrey Garnett who was given the wood in the 12th century by King Henry II. A statue was carved in its place. A plaque under the statue (since removed) read:

"Over 800 years ago Geffrey Garnet owned and walked these woods. They were given to him in 1165 as a knights fee a gift of land big enough to support a knight. Then in the service of King Henry II. The same trees that grew then are growing today and still yielding a coppiced wood crop. Now Garnetts Wood belongs to you. Welcome to your woodland."
