= Great Canfield =

Village in Essex, England

Coordinates: 51.8413°N 0.2957°E

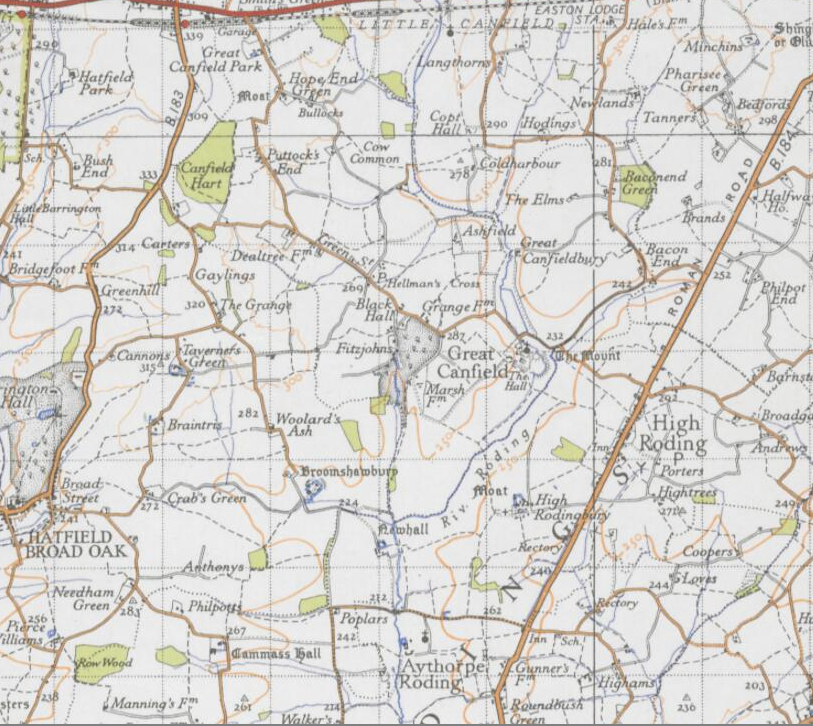
- Great Canfield civil parish, Uttlesford District 1945

- Location within Essex
- Population: 476 (Parish, 2021)
- OS grid reference: TL 58251 18352
  - London: 25 mi (40 km) SW
- Civil parish: Great Canfield
- District: Uttlesford
- Shire county: Essex
- Region: East
- Country: England
- Sovereign state: United Kingdom
- Post town: Dunmow
- Postcode district: CM6
- Dialling code: 01279
- Police: Essex
- Fire: Essex
- Ambulance: East of England

Great Canfield is a village and civil parish in the Uttlesford district of Essex, England. The village, which sits at the south-east edge of its civil parish, is approximately 3 miles (5 km) south-west from the small town of Great Dunmow, and one mile (1.6 km) north-west from High Roding. The civil parish contains the hamlets and small settlements of Hope End Green, Hellmans Cross, Bacon End, Baconend Green, and Puttocks End. The River Roding defines the parish border at the south-east, and for one-mile (1.6 km) cuts through the parish before providing part of the north-east border. At the 2021 census the parish had a population of 476.

== Etymology ==
The name of Great Canfield is first attested in the Domesday Book of 1086 as Canefelda and similar spellings. Scholars agree that the second part of the name derives from Old English feld ("field"). The first part of the name is usually given as an Old English personal name Cana, but it has been suggested that this element was actually the common noun cāna ("jackdaws'", genitive plural of cā). Thus the name once meant either "Cana's field" or "jackdaws' field".

The "Great" element was added to the name to distinguish it from Little Canfield, and is first attested in 1254 in the form Magna Kanewell.

== History ==
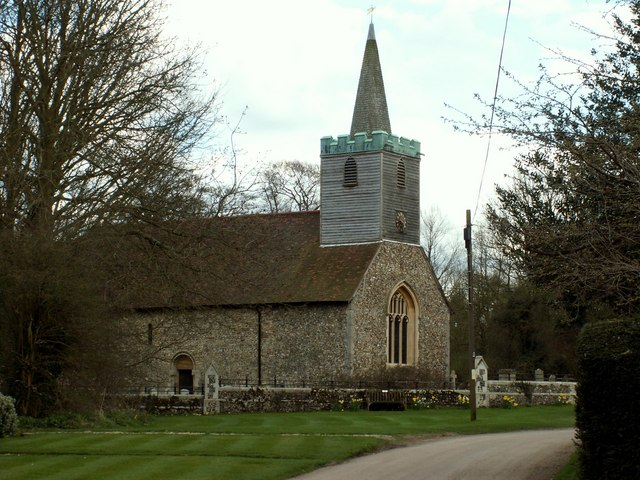
St Mary's Church

Great Canfield civil parish contains Grade listed buildings and historic landscapes, and records dating back to the Domesday Book of 1086. One entry found in the Domesday Book describes Great Canfield as having a "Value to the Lord in 1066 [of] £6" and agricultural resources from years 1066 to 1086: "Meadow 51 acres. Woodland 160 pigs. 1 mill."

Great Canfield is one of 104 parishes within the scope of The Hundred Parishes Society, which covers "450 square miles of northwest Essex, northeast Hertfordshire and southern Cambridgeshire". The society aims to raise awareness of the area's character and history and conserve and protect its historic buildings, natural landscape and culture. St Mary's Church at Great Canfield is of particular interest; the church is typically Norman and thought to have been constructed between 1100-1150. It is described as being "in the shadow of an old Motte and Bailey and it was perhaps built on the site of an earlier church". The church contains a 13th–century painting of the Virgin Mary and the baby Jesus. St Mary's is part of a six-church Group ministry in west Essex – the other churches are St Mary the Virgin in Aythorpe Roding, St Andrews's in Halstead, St Mary the Virgin in High Easter, All Saints in High Roding, and the Church of St Margaret of St Antioch in Margaret Roding. The group shares a part-time priest who conducts services in each of the member churches.

At the centre of Great Canfield village, 125 yards (114 m) south-east from the church, are the earthwork remains of Great Canfield Castle. The 280 feet (85 m) diameter and 48 feet (15 m) high remains are of a motte and bailey castle. The remains are set within a wooded area bounded south-east to north-east by a bend of the River Roding, a feed from which was used to supply water to the castle moat. Great Canfield Castle is documented from 1154 to 1216, and is associated with the de Vere Earls of Oxford. Satellite photographs also reveal the outline of a windmill which was destroyed around 1900.

Isaac Lodge, recipient of the Victoria Cross for action during the Second Boer War, was born in the village.

== Population ==
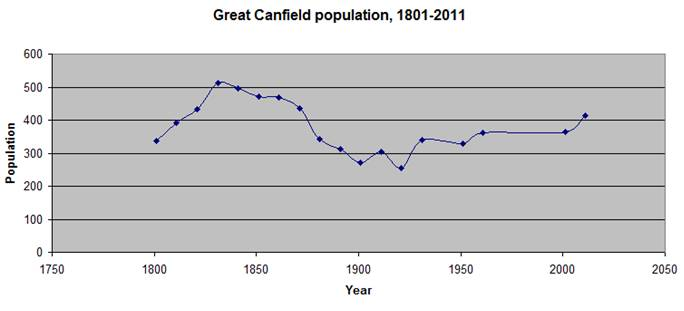
Great Canfield population 1801-2011

Recorded from past census statistics; the population of Great Canfield has seen only one major decline in population, from its peak population of 511 in 1831, to 271 by 1901. Census data shows that a decline in population was consecutive with every recorded census between 1841 and 1901. An increase in population within Great Canfield after the census of 1841 was not recorded until 1911; the population rose from 271 recorded in 1901, to 305 by 1911- an increase of 34. Since the 1921 Census Great Canfield has seen regular increases in population, the greatest between the years 1921-1931 where there was an increase of 86, from 254 to 340. Since then the increases have been moderate.

== Housing ==
Since 1801, housing levels have changed in line with changing population. During the 1800s, however, this was not the case. Between the years 1831-1881, Great Canfield recorded an increase in the total number of houses from 93 to 104; the population rate during this time decreased. In the 1900s, the number of houses in Great Canfield increased: between 1921-1961, there was an increase in houses from 75 to 123 with consistent increases being reported at every census. The 2001 and 2011 censuses show an increase in the total number of houses within Great Canfield- the 2001 Census registered a total of 133 houses, and the 2011 Census, 156. This may be due to the pressure of increasing urban development within Great Canfield, however, such development remains widely rejected within the Great Canfield community. A scheme of 31 July 2014 proposed major residential development within Great Canfield with the building of a further 211 homes on the land west of Canfield Road. The proposal was refused on the 5 November 2014 by Uttlesford District Council.

== Employment ==
Percentage of people working in different areas of industry within Great Canfield civil parish according to the 1881 Census

Pie chart showing the distribution of occupational data for Great Canfield in 2011

Historically the measurement of employment within parishes such as Great Canfield has been varied in terms of categorizing workers within different industries. The 1801 Census primarily recorded levels of occupation by "those 'chiefly employed in agriculture', those 'chiefly employed in trade, manufacturers or handicraft', and others". By the census of 1841 the recording of occupational data had moved on from categorizing workers into 4 broad areas of industry 'and others'; the census now "listed over 3000 different occupational titles". This allowed for future census data to categorize these approximately 3000 job titles into more varied and accurate areas of industry. By the census of 1881 the occupational data for parishes such as Great Canfield was more organised than previous census data:

By 1881 Great Canfield had a working population of around 167, the majority within agriculture, and employed by farmers and land owners as labourers and to tend crops; this accounted for 47% of the working population of Great Canfield. The fact the majority of workers were employed within the agricultural industry reflects the social demographics of the occupants living in Great Canfield during the 1800s; the majority of people would have fallen under the 'labourers & servants' social status with little education and no professional trade. The second majority which was 30% of Great Canfield's workforce in 1881, falls under the 'unknown' – this does not just suggest unemployment but reflects the inconsistency of the census data during this time period in terms of jobs that do not fall under any title, or occupants not accurately recording their job title. A percentage of those under the 'unknown' section would have fallen under the unemployed sector.

Within the 1800s it is accurate to state that Great Canfield was mostly made up of people employed within the agricultural industry, most of whom would have been on a low income. Occupational distribution of Great Canfield based on the 2011 Census shows the majority percentage of employment is within the 'Managers, Directors and Senior Officials' sector with 21% of the working population within this sector. The second majority in distribution of employment as of the 2011 Census is within the 'skilled trades occupations' sector, making up 17% of the working population. A change from Great Canfield's distribution of employment in 1881 until 2011 is the percentage of employment within the 'professional occupations', the distribution within this sector in 1881 was 2% of Great Canfield's working population, the distribution in 'professional occupations' in 2011 was 15% – an increase of 13%. The type of sectors since 1881 has changed over 130 years; the emergence of technology has allowed new job titles and industries to be created and other industries to decrease, such as Great Canfield's agricultural industry.
