= Stondon Massey =

Village in Essex, England

Coordinates: 51.680°N 0.292°E

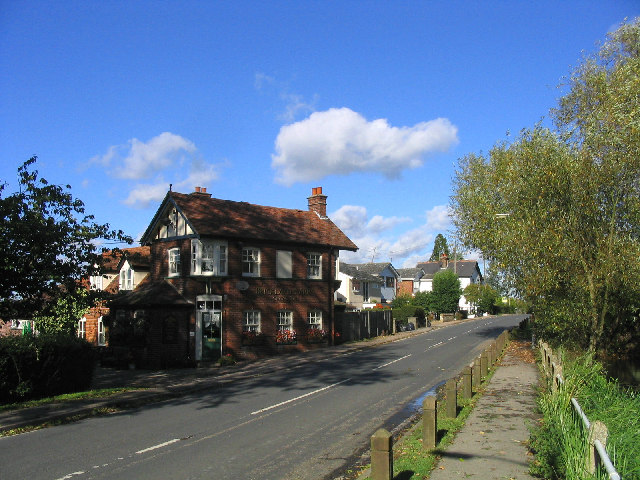
- The Bricklayers Arms, Stondon Massey

- Location within Essex
- Interactive map of Stondon Massey
- Population: 739 (Parish, 2021)
- OS grid reference: TL584004
- Civil parish: Stondon Massey
- District: Brentwood
- Shire county: Essex
- Region: East
- Country: England
- Sovereign state: United Kingdom
- Post town: BRENTWOOD
- Postcode district: CM15
- Dialling code: 01277
- Police: Essex
- Fire: Essex
- Ambulance: East of England
- UK Parliament: Brentwood and Ongar
- Website: Stondon Massey Parish Council

Stondon Massey is a village and civil parish in the Borough of Brentwood in Essex, England. The village is to the north of Brentwood, between Blackmore and Doddinghurst. At the 2021 census the parish had a population of 739.

Stondon Massey hosts an annual fete on the village green.

== Etymology and history ==
Stondon means "stone hill", a Saxon settlement was established near to the site of the 12th-century church of St Peter's & St Paul's, where William Byrd, the Tudor composer is likely to be buried. A low gravel hill was known as a ‘down’. Hence the name Stondon. Massey is derived from the surname of Serlo de Marcy, a Norman knight who lived in Marks Hall, Margaret Roding.

There have been three successive manor houses, the oldest of which is Stondon Hall, near the church. The north wing of the Hall is probably of the 15th century, and there is some 16th- and 17th-century panelling inside. Stondon Place, originally a farmhouse, was rebuilt about 1707, and again after a fire, about 1880. From 1593 to 1623, it was the home of William Byrd, the musician.

The church of St Peter and St Paul retains the nave and chancel and some of the original round-headed arches of 1100. There is a monumental brass of 1570 to John Carre, Ironmonger and Merchant Adventurer of London, with figures of himself and his two wives, and another, of 1573, to Rainold Hollingsworth. Nathaniel Ward, Rector of Stondon from 1623 to 1633, was deprived of his living for non-conformity. He subsequently emigrated to New England and helped draft the 1641 Code of Laws for Massachusetts.

The main part of the village is now just over a mile to the south of the church, probably due to the plague of 1350. Stondon Massey is still mainly rural, but there has been some suburban building during the past 30 years.

== Political ==
The village forms part of the Tipps Cross ward of Brentwood Council. It also forms part of the "Five Parishes", being Stondon Massey, Blackmore, Kelvedon Hatch, Navestock and Doddinghurst. These are all covered by the voluntary first aiders, The Five Parishes First Response.

== Sport ==
A short lived greyhound racing grass circuit track was opened on Brook Farm in 1928. The racing was independent (not affiliated to the sports governing body the National Greyhound Racing Club) and was known as a flapping track, which was the nickname given to independent tracks. The track known as Stondon and Blackmore hosted racing for two summers and was well attended.
