= Bishop's Green, Essex =

Hamlet in Essex, England

Coordinates: 51.837°N 0.366°E

Bishop's Green
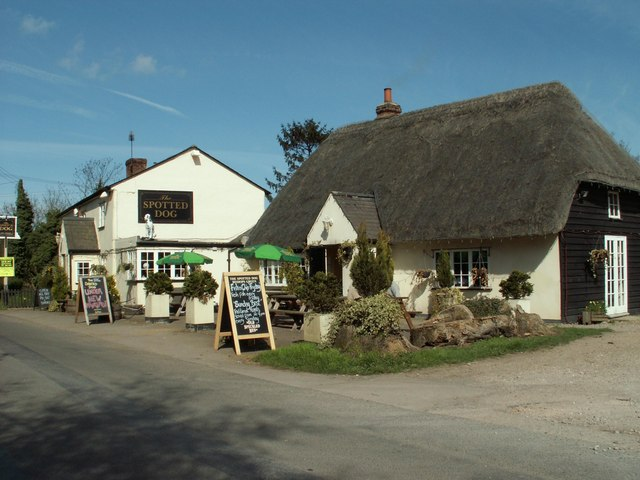
- The Spotted Dog public house, Bishop's Green

- Location within Essex
- Civil parish: High Easter
- District: Uttlesford
- Shire county: Essex
- Region: East
- Country: England
- Sovereign state: United Kingdom
- Police: Essex
- Fire: Essex
- Ambulance: East of England

Bishop's Green is a hamlet in the civil parish of High Easter, in the Uttlesford district of Essex, England. The hamlet is on the road between the villages of High Easter and Barnston. The hamlet of Wellstye Green is less than 1 mile (1.6 km) northeast.

Bishop's Green's public house is The Spotted Dog.
