= Bardfield Saling =

Village in Essex, England

Coordinates: 51.9131°N 0.4482°E

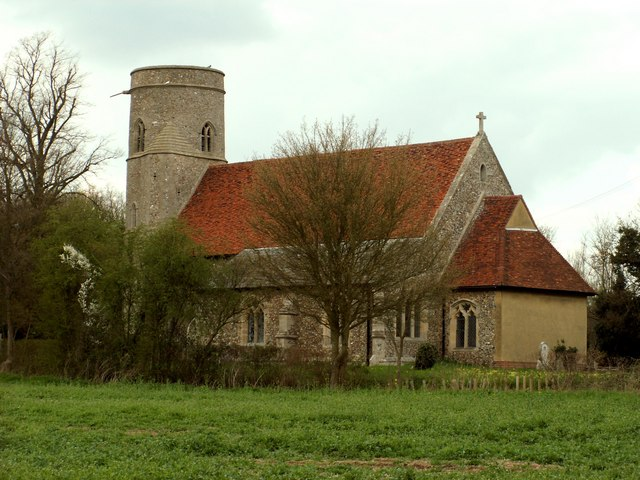
- St. Peter and St. Paul's church, Bardfield Saling

- Location within Essex
- Population: 193 (Parish, 2011)
- OS grid reference: TL684266
- Civil parish: The Salings
- District: Braintree
- Shire county: Essex
- Region: East
- Country: England
- Sovereign state: United Kingdom
- Post town: BRAINTREE
- Postcode district: CM7
- Dialling code: 01371
- Police: Essex
- Fire: Essex
- Ambulance: East of England
- UK Parliament: Braintree

Bardfield Saling is a village in the civil parish of The Salings, in the Braintree district of Essex, England. It is approximately 5 miles (8 km) west-northwest of Braintree and is 12 miles (19 km) north from the county town of Chelmsford.

== History ==
Bardfield Saling was historically a chapelry in the ancient parish of Great Bardfield in the Freshwell hundred of Essex. The chapelry was also known as Little Saling, and became a separate parish in 1574.

There are 31 listed buildings in the village, including the Grade I listed Church of St Peter and St Paul.

In 2019 the parish was merged with the neighbouring parish of Great Saling to form a new civil parish called The Salings. At the 2011 census (the last before the abolition of the civil parish), Bardfield Saling had a population of 193.

== See also ==
- The Hundred Parishes
