= Wellstye Green =

Hamlet in Essex, England

Coordinates: 51.844°N 0.378°E

- Location within Essex
- Civil parish: Barnston
- District: Uttlesford
- Shire county: Essex
- Region: East
- Country: England
- Sovereign state: United Kingdom
- Police: Essex
- Fire: Essex
- Ambulance: East of England

Wellstye Green or Wells Tye Green is a hamlet in the civil parish of Barnston, in the Uttlesford district of Essex, England. It is between the villages of High Easter and Barnston.

It is the location of the Anglian Land Drainage Ltd (at Mawkinsherds Farm).
