= Great Saling =

Village in Essex, England

Coordinates: 51°54′N 0°28′E

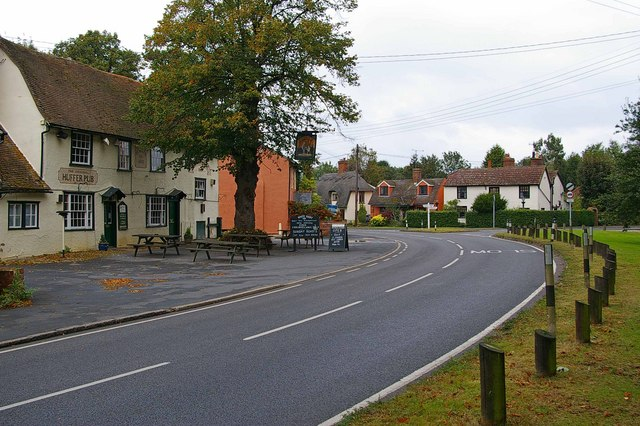
- White Hart in Great Saling

- Location within Essex
- Civil parish: The Salings
- District: Braintree
- Shire county: Essex
- Region: East
- Country: England
- Sovereign state: United Kingdom
- Police: Essex
- Fire: Essex
- Ambulance: East of England

Great Saling is a village in the civil parish of The Salings, in the Braintree district of Essex, England. It lies 4 miles (6 km) north-west of the town of Braintree.

== History ==
Great Saling was an ancient parish in the Hinckford hundred of Essex. As well as Great Saling village, the parish included surrounding rural areas including the hamlet of Blake End. The parish church is dedicated to St James, and is in the Diocese of Chelmsford. It is Grade II* listed.

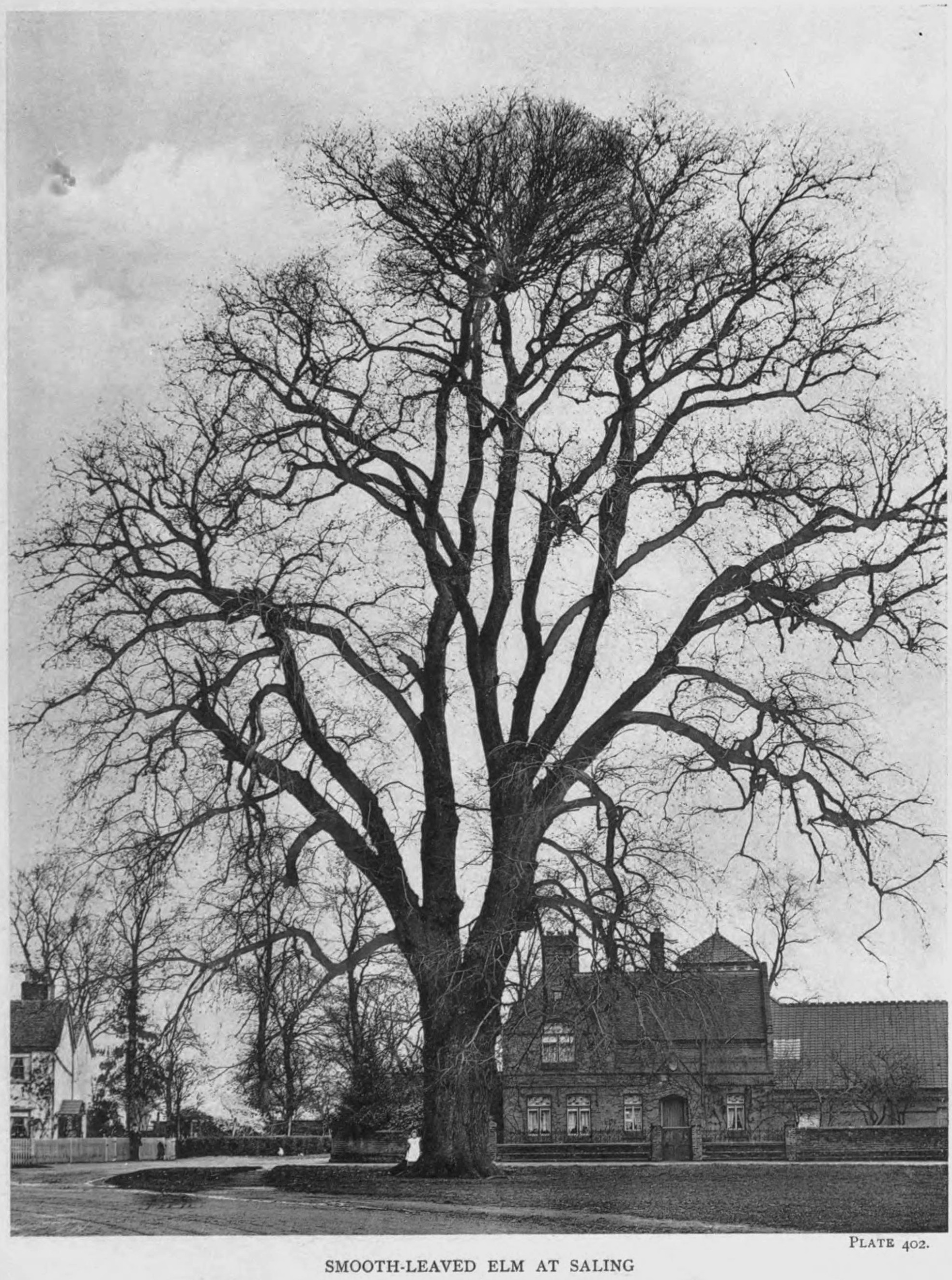
Large elm tree which formerly stood on the village green

The village had on its green what was reputed to be the largest elm tree in England. With a girth of 22 feet 6 inches and a height of 40 metres, the elm was identified by the botanist R. H. Richens as an Ulmus × hollandica hybrid, before it succumbed to Dutch Elm Disease in the 1970s.

RAF Andrews Field, sometimes called RAF Great Saling, was built near the village by the United States Army Air Forces as the first aerodrome to be built by the Americans on British soil during the Second World War. Work on the aerodrome was started in July 1942. It was named after Frank Maxwell Andrews, an American general who was killed in May 1943, shortly before the aerodrome opened.

In 2019 the parish was merged with the neighbouring parish of Bardfield Saling to form a new civil parish called The Salings. At the 2011 census (the last before the abolition of the civil parish), Great Saling had a population of 282.

== See also ==
- The Hundred Parishes
- Baron Haden-Guest
