= Stagden Cross =

Hamlet in Essex, England, United Kingdom

Coordinates: 51.8090°N 0.3735°E

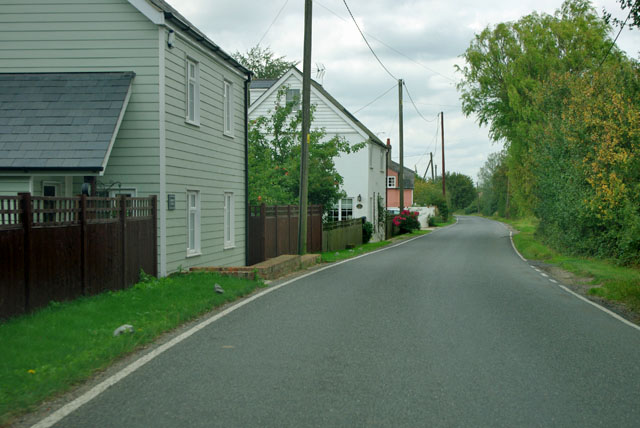
- Cottages along The Street in Stagden Cross

- Location within Essex
- Civil parish: High Easter
- District: Uttlesford
- Shire county: Essex
- Region: East
- Country: England
- Sovereign state: United Kingdom
- Police: Essex
- Fire: Essex
- Ambulance: East of England

Stagden Cross is a hamlet in the civil parish of High Easter, and the Uttlesford district of Essex, England. The hamlet is 1 mile (1.6 km) east from High Easter village.

Rolfes Farmhouse in Stagden Cross is a Grade II listed timber framed and plastered farmhouse, formerly a one-story hall, dating to the 14th century. Stagden Cross Farmhouse is a timber framed and plastered Grade II former farmhouse dating to the 16th century; to the south of the farmhouse is the Grade II listed timber framed and black weatherboarded barn also dating to the 16th century.
