= Arthur Goodwin Hudson =

This person's surname was Goodwin Hudson and sometimes Hudson alone.

Arthur William Goodwin Hudson (31 March 1905 – 18 September 1985) was a coadjutor bishop in the Anglican Diocese of Sydney.

He studied at the London College of Divinity and was ordained in the Church of England as a deacon in Advent 1940 (22 December) at St Aldate's, Oxford and as a priest the next Advent (28 December 1941) at Rochester Cathedral — both times by Christopher Chavasse, Bishop of Rochester. With the surname Hudson, he began his career as a Curate at St Paul, Chatham; by 28 May 1943, he had the surname Goodwin-Hudson and was Vicar of Good Easter. From 1945 to 1948 he was Headmaster at Windsor School, Santiago and then the incumbent at St James, Holloway until 1955. From 1949 to 1960 he was the General Secretary of the South American Missionary Society. After being Vicar at Woodford Wells (1955-60) he was appointed to serve the Sydney diocese as coadjutor bishop; he was consecrated a bishop by Geoffrey Fisher, Archbishop of Canterbury, on Lady Day (25 March) 1960, at Westminster Abbey. He was also Dean of Sydney from 1962 to 1965. After four years based in Point Piper he returned to England and became Vicar of St Paul's, Portman Square.

He died in 1985.
