= Great Canfield Castle =

Castle in the United Kingdom

Coordinates: 51.83693°N 0.31363°E

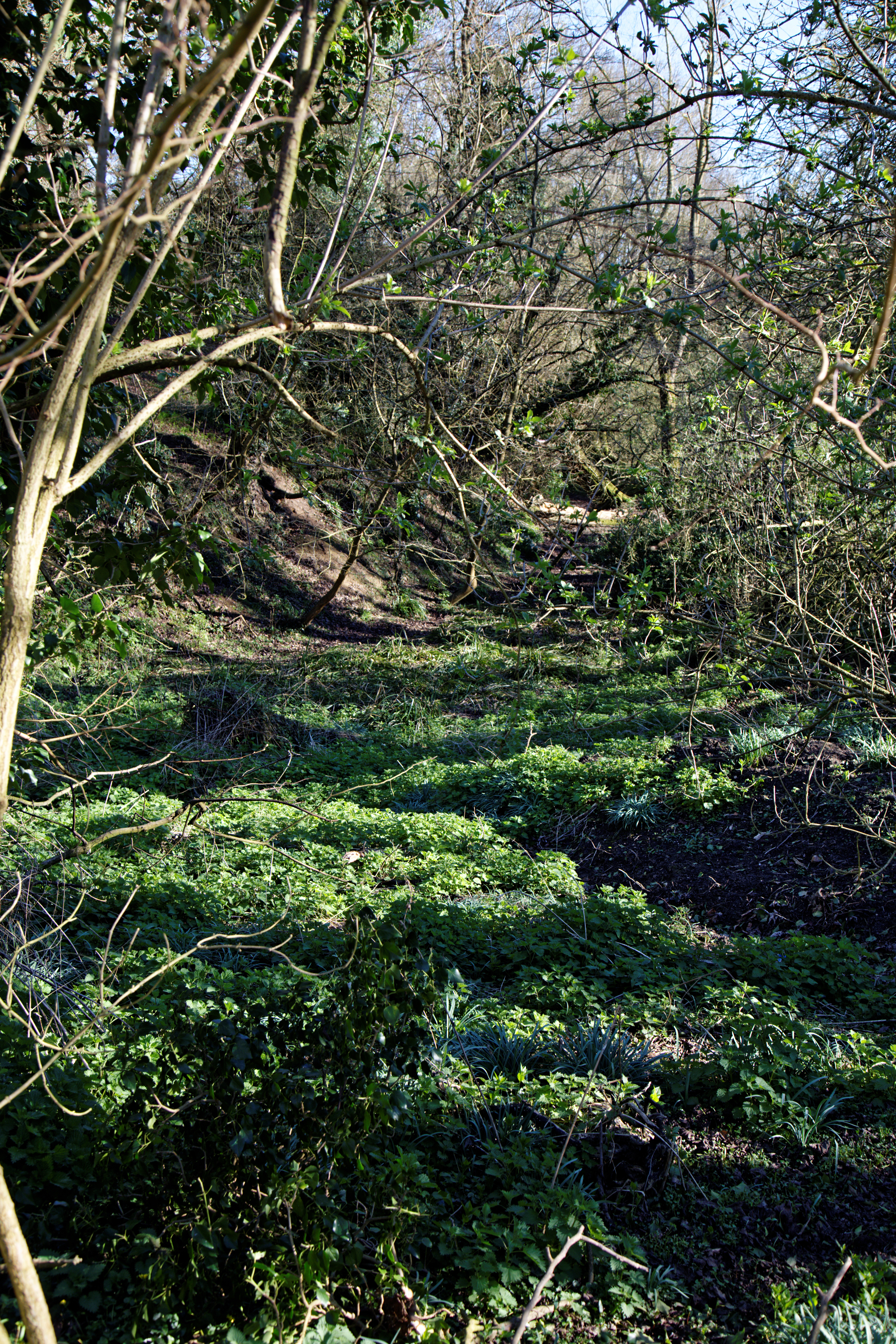
The overgrown moat ditch of the castle in 2017

Great Canfield Castle lies in the small village of Great Canfield, 3 miles (5 km) south-west of Great Dunmow in Essex, England: grid reference TL595179.

The lords of Canfield, the de Veres, built a motte and bailey castle on low ground near the River Roding, probably in the late 11th or early 12th century. The keep was constructed of timber. In the 1130s-1140s Aubrey de Vere II or his son Aubrey III the first Earl of Oxford may have diverted a tributary of the river to flood the ditch around the motte; the water was managed by a dam system. Excavations suggest that the moat was 20' 7" deep, 11' lower than the water table.

The Vere lords held at Canfield by two feudal tenures in the Domesday Book of 1086: as tenant-in-chief of the crown for two hides and as tenant of Count Alan of Brittany, lord of Richmond for one hide. Over time, the Richmond lordship seems to have been forgotten and the Vere Earls of Oxford came to hold all three hides of the king. The estate's manor rolls survive from 14 December, 1346, into the 16th century.

Only the earthworks now remain.
