= Sewards End =

Village in Essex, England

Coordinates: 52°1′12″N 0°17′13″E

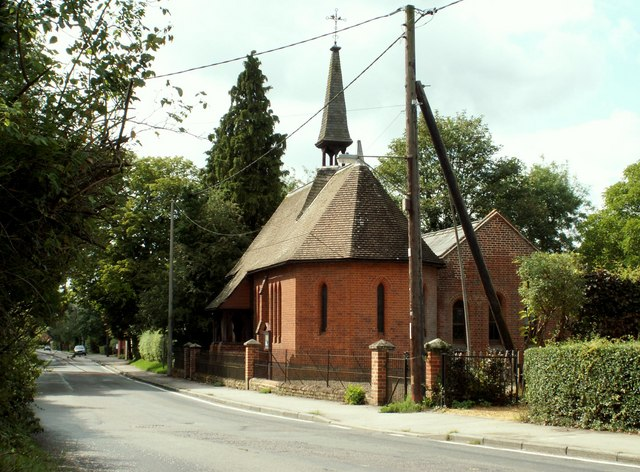
- St James's Church

- Location within Essex
- Population: 531 (Parish, 2021)
- Civil parish: Sewards End
- District: Uttlesford
- Shire county: Essex
- Region: East
- Country: England
- Sovereign state: United Kingdom
- Post town: SAFFRON WALDEN
- Postcode district: CB10

Sewards End is a village and civil parish in the Uttlesford district of Essex, England. It lies 2 miles (3 km) east of the centre of Saffron Walden, its post town. At the 2021 census the parish had a population of 531.

Sewards End was historically part of the parish of Saffron Walden. It became a separate parish in 2004. The parish has 23 listed buildings.

== Location ==
Sewards End is in the county of Essex, in south eastern England, 43 miles from London, 17 miles from Cambridge, 14 miles from Bishop's Stortford and one mile from Saffron Walden.

== History ==
In the 11th century Sewards End did not exist as a defined community. At that time there were four smaller communities around what would eventually become Sewards End.

Probably the most influential at that time was Wills Ayley where Monks from Saffron Walden had been granted 60 acres of land in 1070. In 1090 Geoffrey de Mandeville, Lord of Saffron Walden, granted 60 acres of land to Sigesward reputedly his food taster. Ten years after his death in Belgium in 1114, his grandson, Albold de Pouncyn applied to have the land reinstated to him. Albold named the village in memory of his grandfather.

The monks of Wills Ayley acquired St Aylotts by 1248. Everyone had to serve the Monks and over the next 200 years they took over the village.

In the mid 14th century the Black Death reached Sewards end and the population of the village reduced from 400 to 100.

By the 15th century the monastery applied for and was granted the position of land recorders and they grabbed the titles of every available land holding.

Very early in the 16th century the village was amalgamated under the name of Sewers End.

However, the monks continued to dominate. Rents were high and men, women and children had to work 7 days a week in order to pay rent. Seeking wood for fuel or catching rabbits for food led to flogging or hanging. The citizens of Sewards End were virtual prisoners within the confines of the village as they had to pay at the toll gates set up around every exit and entry to the village.

In 1531 things were to change. Henry the VIII was on the throne and he severed links with Rome. The Act of Reformation outlawed the Monasteries. The people of Sewards End joined in with what was happening elsewhere. Monks were captured and hung or forced to flee and Monasteries were sacked. This is why there is no trace of the Monastery at Wills Ayley.

The community's name has changed over the centuries from Syward-hes-haund in 1286, Sewardsende in the mid 14th century and eventually to the name close to the one used today, Sewers End a name that continued until as late as 1911.

As Sewards End dates back many centuries, it is fortunate to include many examples of fine historic architecture, including buildings such as "Everards" the folly known as "The Towers", and the early 1900's "Satis House".

In 2014 the Tour de France cycle race passed through the village watched by many people including a significant number of non- villagers.

Sewards End was historically part of the parish of Saffron Walden. It became a separate civil parish in 2004.

== Church and school ==
The village's church, St James', is a chapel of ease of St Mary's Church, Saffron Walden. It was built in 1847 and substantially enlarged in 1870. The church building was also used as a school from 1847 to 1947. In May 1885 the average school attendance was 90 pupils.

== Recent change ==
In common with many other rural villages of its size, Sewards End has seen many changes in recent decades. There was a working mill until 1914 but it was demolished soon after. The 2nd half of the 20th century saw the village moving away from its rural roots where a high percentage of the population either worked on the land or in local industry, to the role of dormitory village, the population frequently commuting to Cambridge or further afield to London via road and rail links.

These changes have inevitably led to alterations in the social fabric of the community and they are evidenced by the closure of the village's two pubs (The Fox and the Green Dragon), its local shop, post office and garage as well as the downsizing of its once vibrant cricket club during the last 3 decades of the 20th century. After many years without a home, Sewards End Cricket Club has survived by playing Sunday social cricket over the years and continues to do so with the aim of playing regularly back in the village once again.

Villagers' lifestyles have moved on and so have their social and economic ambitions. The positive aspects of those changes were consolidated when local residents Alice Olley and Seamus McNally campaigned to have the village identity recognized, culminating in the creation of a new civil parish, Alice going on to be the first ever chair of Sewards End Parish Council. parish council.

Village life is also enhanced through the successful and active village hall and thriving parish church, St James.

== Conservation ==
The increasing affluence of the area has also seen several examples of sympathetic restoration to local properties such as "Campions", "Satis House", "Wheel Hall Cottage" and more recently "Sewards End Farmhouse".

== See also ==
- The Hundred Parishes
