= Margaret Roding =

Village in Essex, England

Coordinates: 51.783°N 0.3148°E

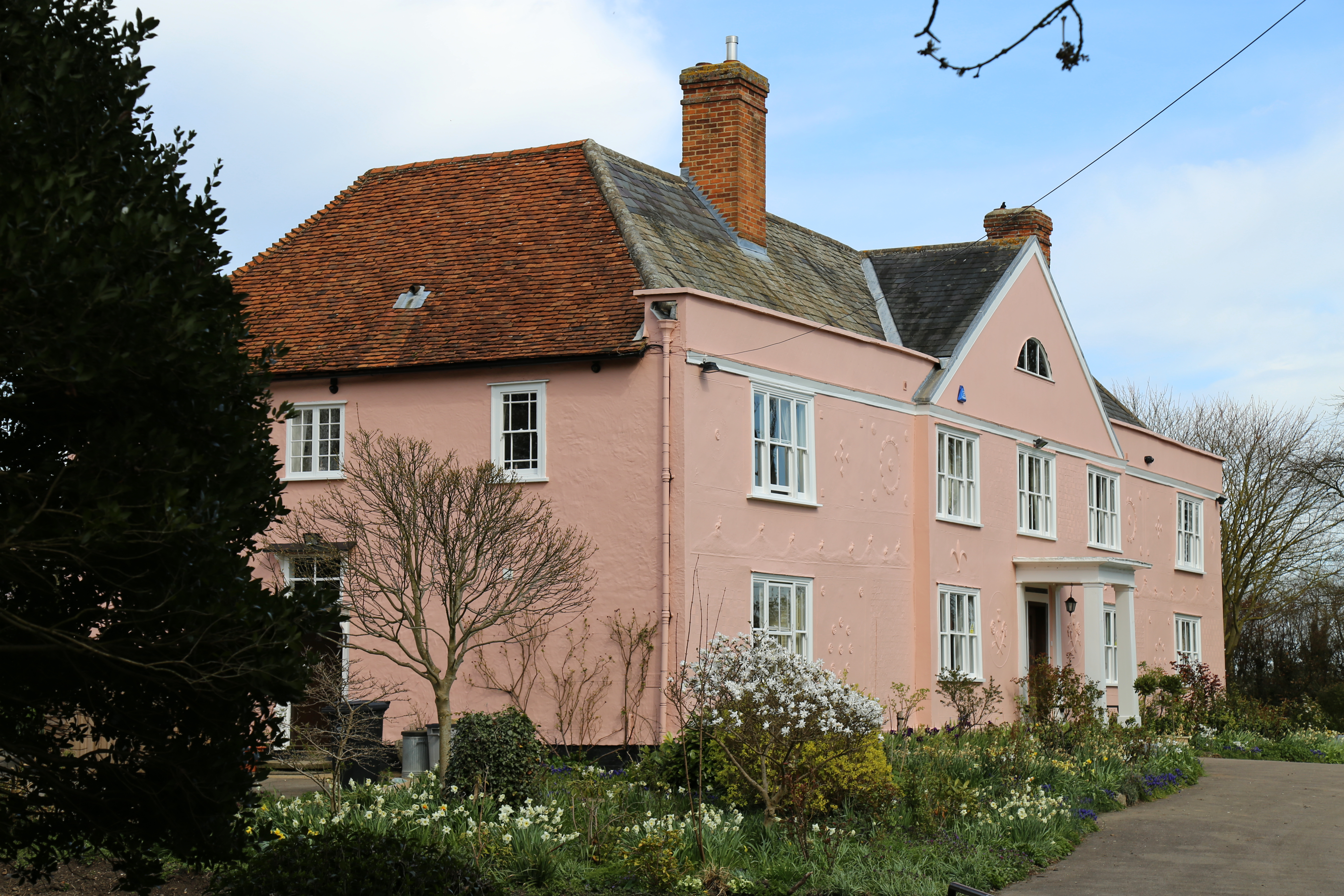
- Garnish Hall, Margaret Roding

- Location within Essex
- Population: 215 (Parish, 2021)
- OS grid reference: TL5971
- District: Uttlesford
- Shire county: Essex
- Region: East
- Country: England
- Sovereign state: United Kingdom
- Post town: Dunmow
- Postcode district: CM6
- Police: Essex
- Fire: Essex
- Ambulance: East of England
- UK Parliament: North West Essex

Margaret Roding is a village and civil parish in the Uttlesford district of Essex, England. The village is included in the eight hamlets and villages called The Rodings. Margaret Roding is 7 miles (11 km) north-west from the county town of Chelmsford. At the 2021 census the parish had a population of 215.

== History ==
According to A Dictionary of British Place Names, Roding derives from "Rodinges" as is listed in the Domesday Book of 1086, with the later variation 'Roinges Sancte Margaret' recorded in 1245. The 'Margaret' refers to the dedication of the parish church. Margaret Roding itself is not listed in Domesday.

Traditional alternative names for the parish and village include Margaret Roothing and Margaret Rooding, although the parish was contemporaneously referred to with the 'Roding' suffix in trade directories, gazetteers, and in official documents and maps. Today the official parish name is 'Margaret Roding'.

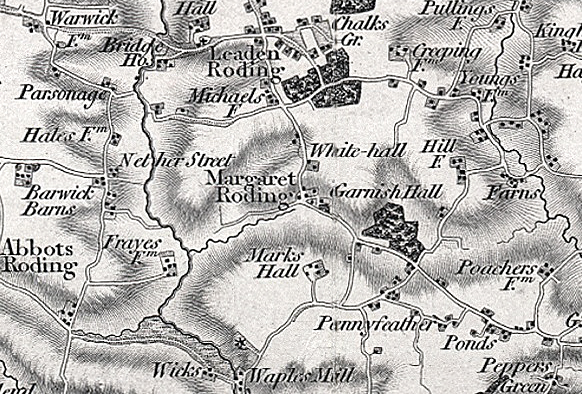
Margaret Roding, Ordnance Survey map 1805

The parish was in the Hundred of Dunmow. The manors within Margaret Roding parish were those of 'Roding Margaret' (or Barnets), and 'Marcas Fee' (or Marks). The manor house for Roding Margaret was Garnish Hall (previously 'Garnets' and 'Olives'), to the east of St Margaret of Antioch's Church. This manor estate was in the possession of the De Vere Earls of Oxford until c.1390. The manor of Marcas Fee took its name from the manor owners, with its manor house and private chapel about a mile south from the church; this manor was given by Henry IV and Walter Skirlaw, the Bishop of Durham, to University College, Oxford in 1403. During the reign of James I both manors were held under the possession of Sir Francis Hubbard of Stansted Mountfitchet before being sold in 1672.

From the 1830s, Margaret Roding was in the Dunmow Union—poor relief provision set up under the Poor Law Amendment Act 1834 —and part of the Rural Deanery of Roding. The registers of the Church of St Margaret of Antioch date to 1538; 19th-century sittings in the church numbered 150. The 1882 living was a rectory, formerly belonging to the Abbey of St Albans, with residence and 43 acres (0.17 km^{2}) of glebe, being land used for the support of the incumbent. There was an endowment of 30 shillings for distribution of bread to the poor, and a James Bentley gave an 1865 gift of £400, the £12 yearly interest from which was for the upkeep of churchyard and to keep walls in good repair. James Bentley, in 1831, had sponsored the living and glebe of the parish, which also included income from a number of garden allotments. The 1882 and 1894 Lords of the Manor and principal landowners were the Rev Ralph Colley Smith and the Master and fellows of University College, Oxford. By 1902 the Rev Smith had been replaced by a Mrs Barnard as joint Lord and principal landowner, and by 1914 she replaced by a Mrs Marshall. By a Local Government Order on 24 March 1888, a detached part of Good Easter parish, known as 'Pinches', was added to Margaret Roding.

Margaret Roding school for poor children was endowed in 1731 with £14 interest from a farm at Hatfield Broad Oak, given by a former rector, and £20 by James Bentley, which was managed by the contemporary rector. There was a further Public Elementary School for boys and girls, which, by 1914, had an average attendance of 40; the school was enlarged in 1910 to teach 84 children, and was under the control of the Essex Education (Dunmow District) Sub-Committee. The village was the headquarters for the Margaret Roothing Benefit Society, whose members numbered 500 in 1882; membership of the society diminished to 400 by 1914.

In 1848 there was 1,222 acres (4.9 km^{2}) of parish land, rising to 12,285 acres (49.7 km^{2}) in 1914. Population in 1841 was 272; in 1881, 225; in 1891, 237; in 1901, 210; and in 1911, 214 in the civil parish and 196 in the ecclesiastical parish. Crops grown at the time were chiefly wheat, barley and beans, on a heavy soil with a clay subsoil.

Parish occupations in 1848 included seven farmers, with one at Garnish Hall, and another at Mark Hall, a blacksmith, a corn miller, and the licensee of the Horse Shoes public house. In 1882 these included a grocer, a miller at Waples Mill, and four farmers. One of the farmers was also a landowner, and others at Garnish Hall and Marks Hall. Marks Hall Farm paid tithes to the rector of Stondon Massey, and was an independent chapelry. By 1894 the number of farmers remained the same, including those at Garnish Hall and Mark Hall, and the miller was listed as using wind and water. Farmers in 1902 numbered four, with one at Butts End, with other occupations including the licensee of the Carpenters' Arms, a farm bailiff, the sub-postmaster at the Post Office, a shopkeeper and a beer retailer at Birds Green, and a photographic enlarger & artist at Highhams. Listed in 1914 was the shopkeeper & Post Office sub-postmaster, a carpenter, six farmers, an assistant overseer, and the paymaster for the Margaret Roothing Benefit Society.
