= West Essex, New Jersey =

Region of Essex County, New Jersey, United States

West Essex is the far northwestern region of Essex County, New Jersey, United States, bordering Passaic County and Morris County.

It is considered to be one of the more affluent parts of the county, as opposed to the eastern Essex cities such as Newark, East Orange, and Irvington. West Essex is more suburban. Most of the municipalities have typically been white ethnically, where Newark and its bordering cities all have black majorities. West Essex also has substantial Hispanic and Asian populations. Places that separate Newark and East Orange from the West Essex area, such as South Orange, Maplewood, West Orange, Bloomfield, and Montclair have a balance of black and white people, and of different classes.

== Municipalities ==
Caldwell, West Caldwell, Roseland, Essex Fells, North Caldwell, and Fairfield share much history and culture, having belonged to the Horseneck Tract.

The six municipalities are covered by news site West Essex Now. Livingston's local newspaper is the West Essex Tribune.

== See also ==
- West Essex Regional School District
- West Essex Park
