= Arkesden =

Village in Essex, England

Coordinates: 51.9855°N 0.1573°E

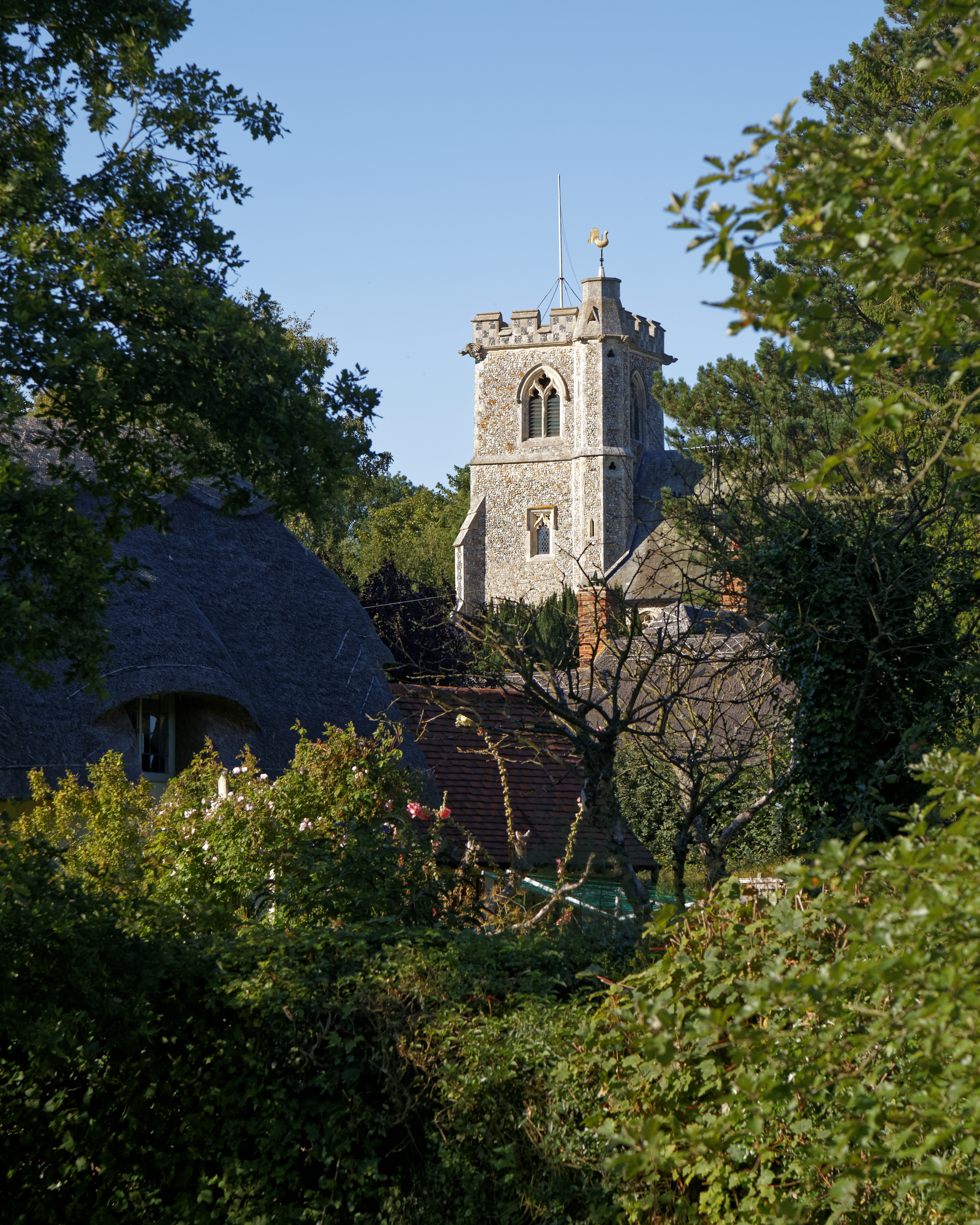
- St Mary's Church, as viewed from Hampit Road

- Location within Essex
- Population: 375 (Parish, 2021)
- OS grid reference: TL482340
- Civil parish: Arkesden
- District: Uttlesford
- Shire county: Essex
- Region: East
- Country: England
- Sovereign state: United Kingdom
- Post town: SAFFRON WALDEN
- Postcode district: CB11
- Dialling code: 01799
- Police: Essex
- Fire: Essex
- Ambulance: East of England
- UK Parliament: North West Essex

Arkesden is a village and civil parish in the Uttlesford district of Essex, England.

The village is 4.3 miles (7 km) south-west from Saffron Walden, approximately 6 miles (10 km) from Bishop's Stortford, Hertfordshire, and 22 miles (35 km) north-west from the county town of Chelmsford. The Wicken Water stream flows through the village.

Arkesden is referred to as "Archesdana" in Domesday Book of 1086, located in the ancient hundred of Uttlesford.

The parish, with its own council, is part of the parliamentary constituency of Saffron Walden. At the 2021 census the parish had a population of 375.

The 13th-century parish church is dedicated to St Mary the Virgin, heavily restored in 1855. The village has a village hall, on the church green, and one public house, the Axe and Compasses.

The musician Steve Marriott, of rock band Small Faces, died in a fire at his home at Arkesden in 1991.

== See also ==
- The Hundred Parishes
