= Good Easter =

Village in Essex, England

Coordinates: 51.7848°N 0.354069°E

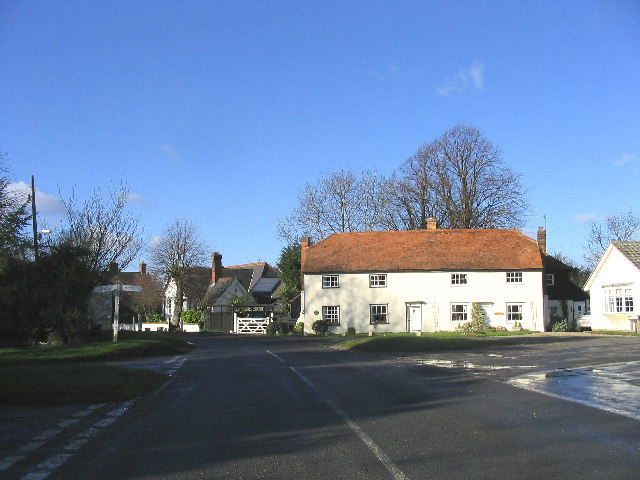
- Crossroads at Good Easter

- Location within Essex
- Population: 370 (Parish, 2021)
- OS grid reference: TL624122
- District: Chelmsford
- Shire county: Essex
- Region: East
- Country: England
- Sovereign state: United Kingdom
- Post town: Chelmsford
- Postcode district: CM1
- Dialling code: 01245
- Police: Essex
- Fire: Essex
- Ambulance: East of England

Good Easter is a village and civil parish in the Chelmsford district of Essex, England. The village is 6 miles (10 km) northwest from the city and county town of Chelmsford. The parish includes the hamlets of Farmbridge End at the south, and Tye Green, conjoined to Good Easter village. The A1060 road is part of the southern boundary of the parish. At the 2021 census the parish had a population of 370.

== History ==
The name 'Good Easter' refers not to the Christian festival 'Easter', but to the 11th-century Estre (listed in the Domesday Book of 1086 as Estra), from the Old English eowestre meaning a sheep fold, or 'a place at the sheep fold'. By 1200 the place was called Godithestre, the 'Good' part of today's place name derived from the Anglo-Saxon woman's name of Godgyth or Godgifu, who probably held possession of the place. The sister village of High Easter to the north, has the same origin, except that the 'High' part refers to the Old English heah (meaning geographically high), that place being Heyestre in 1254.

From before the last quarter of the 19th century to at least the start of the First World War, Good Easter was in the Dunmow Hundred, and in the Chelmsford Union, for relief of the poor. The parish was in the rural deanery of Roding and the Diocese of St Albans. The ecclesiastical parish benefice was in the gift of the Dean and Chapter of St Paul's. The parish church of St Andrew registers date to 1538. In 1902 the church contained 250 sittings. The church was restored in 1878 at a cost of £600. On 22 March 1885 there was a fire which damaged the church; it was restored in 1886 at a cost of £2,200; in 1891 three of the five bells were replaced and two more added, and in 1910 a new organ was installed at the expense of the vicar.

Parish land is of marl and clay overlaying white clay. In the late 19th to early 20th century, crops grown were largely wheat, barley and beans. The 1882 parish area was 2,081 acres (8 km^{2}), supporting an 1881 population of 520. By 1902, area was 1,983 acres (8 km^{2}) plus five acres of water, with a 1901 population of 488 in the civil, and 534 in the ecclesiastical parish. By 1914 it was 1,987 acres (8 km^{2}) plus one acre of water, and a population of 453 (civil) and 485 (ecclesiastical). In 1884, a detached part of Mashbury parish, known as 'Amours' was added to Good Easter, and a detached part of Good Easter parish known as the 'Pinchers' was added to Margaret Roothing parish. The parish hamlets of Chalk End at 1 mile (1.6 km), and Farmbridge at .5 miles (0.80 km) were south, and Tye Green at .5 mile northeast from the village were recorded in trade directories. Chalk End is today in the parish of Roxwell.

A public elementary school for boys and girls was erected in 1844. A school board of five members was formed in 1872 for a Board School for boys and girls, which was built in 1874 at a cost of £1,200, accommodating 100 pupils, which in 1882 had an average attendance of 97. In 1895 the school was enlarged to accommodate 130 pupils, and had an average attendance of 70 and 18 infants, and in 1902 of 67 and 30 infants. By 1902 a police station existed in Good Easter under the charge of a constable.

Parish occupations in 1882 included the publicans of the Old Star, who was also a draper and grocer, the Wheeler's Arms, who was also a wheelwright, The Fountain, and the Hop Pole public houses. There were nine farmers, one of whom was also a butcher, three carpenters, a shoemaker, a shopkeeper, a miller & baker, a blacksmith, a hay & straw carter, and a solicitor and commissioner of oaths. In 1902 included were seven farmers and two farm bailiffs, a blacksmith, a thatcher, a shopkeeper, a hay & straw carter, a baker & miller, and 'Good Easter Stores' trading as a combined grocer, provision dealer & draper, boots & shoes seller and general ironmonger. In 1914 included were still seven farmers and two farm bailiffs, a thatcher, two blacksmiths, a baker, and an assistant overseer who was also a collector of taxes and clerk to the parish council. Publicans at the Old Star who was also a grocer, The Fountain, and Hop Pole public houses still traded in 1914.

== Notable people ==
Horticulturist Beth Chatto was born in Good Easter.

Two Good Easter vicars, Tully Kingdon and Goodwin Hudson, became (Anglican) bishops.
