= Little Canfield =

Village in Essex, England

Coordinates: 51°51′N 0°18′E

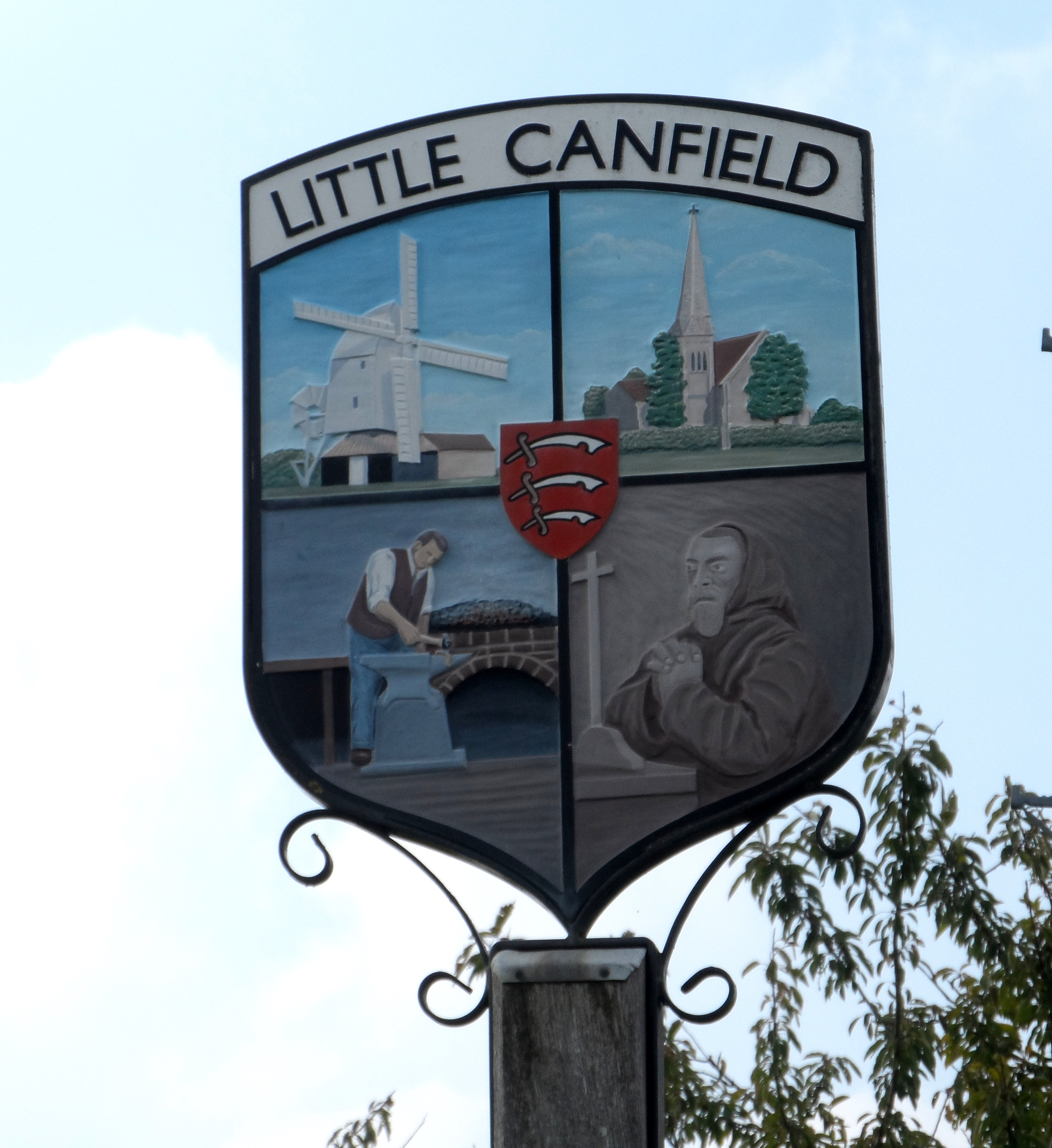
- Village sign

- Location within Essex
- Population: 1,341 (Parish, 2021)
- Civil parish: Little Canfield
- District: Uttlesford
- Shire county: Essex
- Region: East
- Country: England
- Sovereign state: United Kingdom
- Post town: DUNMOW
- Postcode district: CM6
- Police: Essex
- Fire: Essex
- Ambulance: East of England

Little Canfield is a village and a civil parish in the Uttlesford district of Essex, England. The village is situated the B1256 road, near the A120 road and immediately east of the village of Takeley. At the 2021 census the parish had a population of 1,341.

Little Canfield is in the Takeley and the Canfields ward of Uttlesford, and the Dunmow division of Essex County Council.

The village is currently expanding as housing developments are being built around the area. It has a public house, the Lion and Lamb.

== Etymology ==
The name of Little Canfield is first attested in the Domesday Book of 1086 as Canefelda and similar spellings. Scholars agree that the second part of the name derives from Old English feld ("field"). The first part of the name is usually given as an Old English personal name Cana, but it has been suggested that this element was actually the common noun cāna ("jackdaws'", genitive plural of cā). Thus the name once meant either "Cana's field" or "jackdaws' field".

The "Little" element was added to the name to distinguish it from Great Canfield.

== See also ==
- The Hundred Parishes
