= The Salings =

Civil parish in Essex, England

Coordinates: 51.907770°N 0.46084642°E

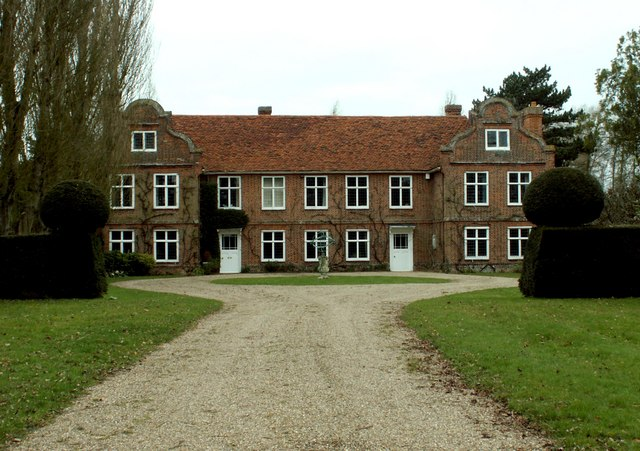
- Saling Hall, Great Saling

- Location within Essex
- Population: 527 (Parish, 2021)
- District: Braintree
- Shire county: Essex
- Region: East
- Country: England
- Sovereign state: United Kingdom
- Post town: BRAINTREE
- Postcode district: CM7
- Dialling code: 01371
- Police: Essex
- Fire: Essex
- Ambulance: East of England
- UK Parliament: Braintree

The Salings is a civil parish in the Braintree District of Essex, England. It includes Bardfield Saling and Great Saling. At the 2021 census the parish had a population of 527.

== History ==
Great Saling and Bardfield Saling were formerly separate parishes. They were merged into a new civil parish called The Salings in 2019.

== Governance ==
There are three tiers of local government covering The Salings, at parish, district, and county level: The Salings Parish Council, Braintree District Council, and Essex County Council. The parish council meets at the village hall on Piccotts Lane in Great Saling.

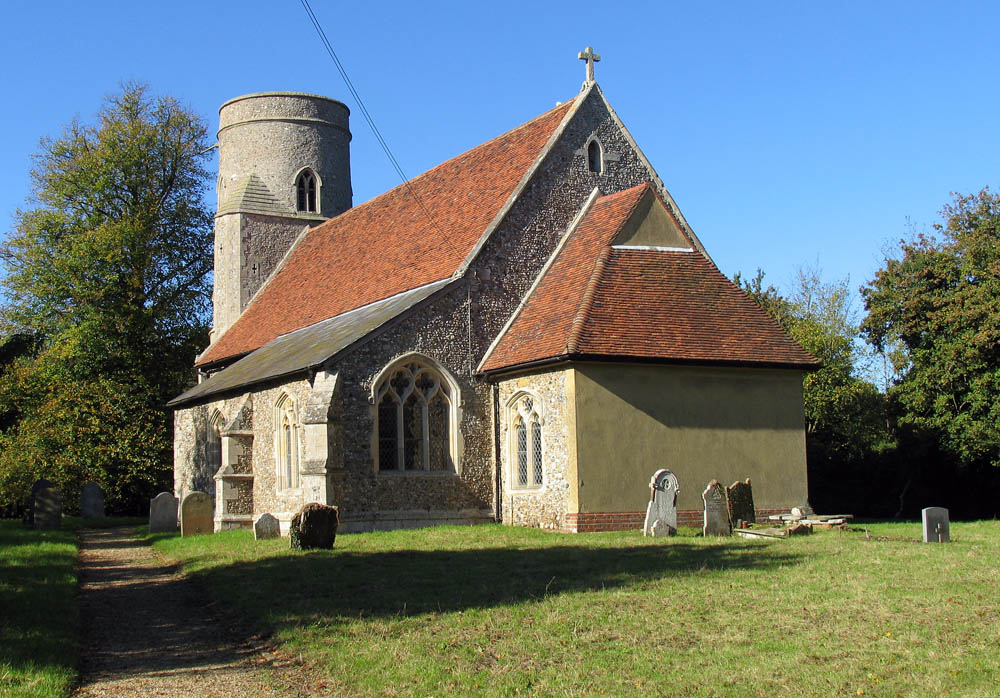
Church of St Peter and St Paul, Bardfield Saling

== See also ==
The Hundred Parishes
