= High Easter =

Village in Essex, England

Coordinates: 51.8071°N 0.348399°E

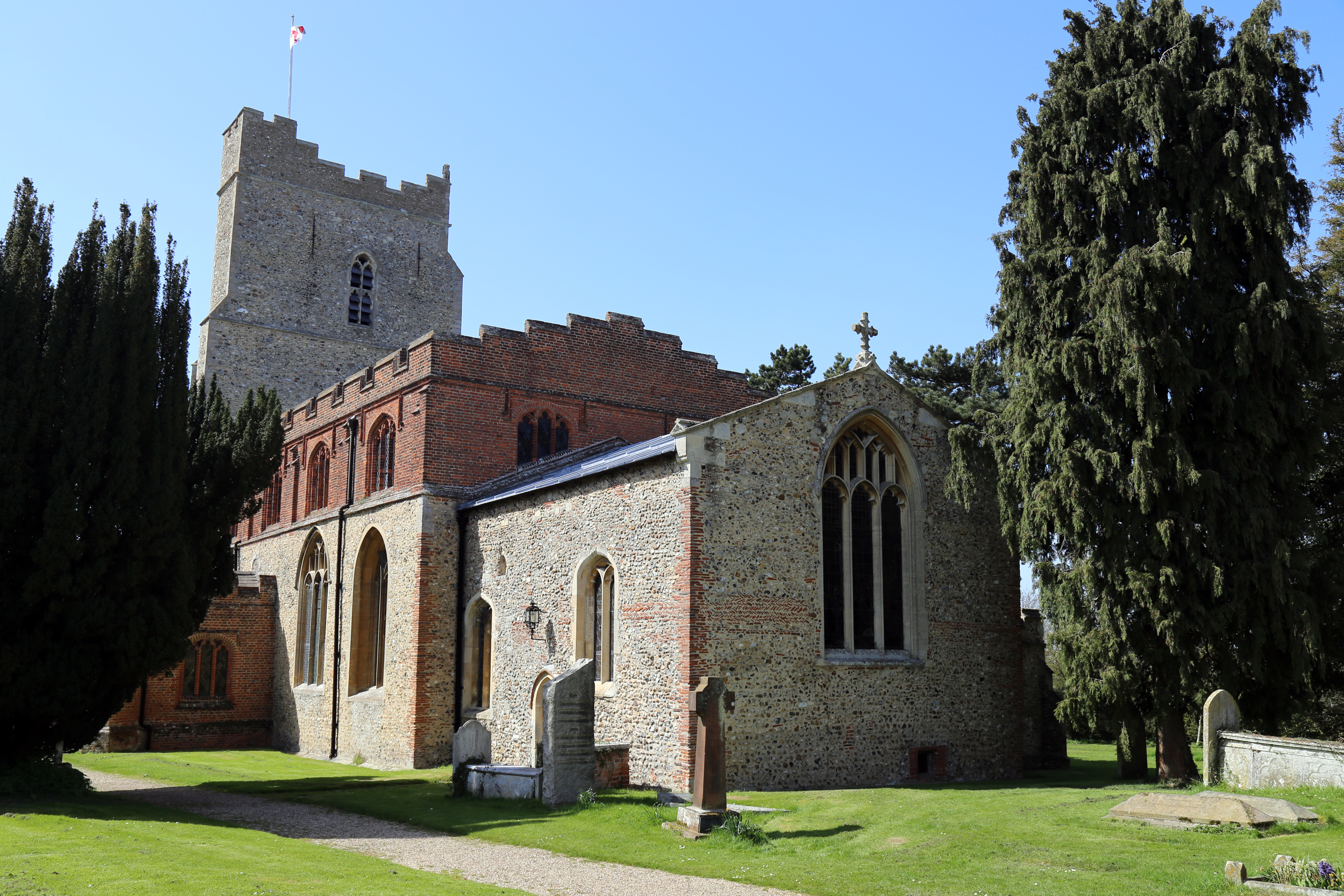
- Parish church of St Mary

- Location within Essex
- Population: 718 (Parish, 2021)
- OS grid reference: TL620146
- District: Uttlesford
- Shire county: Essex
- Region: East
- Country: England
- Sovereign state: United Kingdom
- Post town: Chelmsford
- Postcode district: CM1
- Dialling code: 01245
- Police: Essex
- Fire: Essex
- Ambulance: East of England

High Easter is a village and a civil parish in the Uttlesford district of Essex, England.

The village is 7 miles (11 km) northwest from the city and county town of Chelmsford. The parish includes the hamlets of Bishop's Green and Stagden Cross. Parsonage Brook, at 450 yards (400 m) north from the village, flows northeast to southwest, meeting at the west of the parish the River Can, whose chief source is at the north, 2.5 miles (4.0 km) from the village, near Bishop's Green. High Easter is part of 'The Easters', an area adjacent to The Rodings. At the 2021 census the parish had a population of 718.

== History ==
The name 'High Easter' refers not to the Christian festival 'Easter', but to the 11th-century Estre (in the Domesday Book as Estra), from the Old English eowestre meaning a sheep fold, or 'a place at the sheep fold'. The 'High' part refers to the Old English heah (meaning geographically high), the place name being Heyestre in 1254. The sister village of Good Easter to the south, has the same origin. By 1200 that place was called Godithestre, the 'Good' part of today's place name derived from the Anglo-Saxon woman's name of Godgyth or Godgifu, who probably held possession of the place. High Easter developed as a linear settlement to the west of the parish church and was known as 'High Estra' before the Norman Conquest. The 'High' in the name is because of its elevated position, and also to distinguish the village from its neighbour, Good Easter. The village was also latterly known as 'High Easton'.

Before the Norman Conquest, High Easter belonged to Ely Abbey, but it passed to an Anglo-Saxon landowner known as Asgar the Staller until, like many of Asgar's lands, it was granted after the Conquest to the Norman Geoffrey de Mandeville. The manor house was today's Grade II* listed 'High Easterbury', dating to the 13th century, which is situated to the southwest of the parish church of St Mary. This house and manor was formerly held by the Earls of Essex and the Fitz-Piers, Bohun and Stafford families.

According to Kelly's Directory, High Easter in 1895 was in the Dunmow Hundred, one of The Hundred Parishes, and the rural deanery of Roding. Parish land of 4,826 acres (19.5 km^{2}) was of clay soil and grew chiefly wheat, beans and barley, and supported a population of 690 in 1891. The lady of the manor was Queen Victoria, with major landowners being Lord Rayleigh, Sir Brydges Powell Henniker 4th Henniker baronet, and the trustees of the late Lord Dacre. The Church of St Mary had been "thoroughly restored in 1865 at a cost of £2,200". The church incumbency, vicarage, residence and glebe (land used for the support of a parish priest) were in the gift of the Bishop of London. High Easter's vicar since 1849 was the Rev. Edward Francis Gepp M.A. of Wadham College, Oxford, who was also rural dean of Roding and a JP for Essex. Attached to St Mary's was a National School for 201 mixed children with an average attendance of 60.

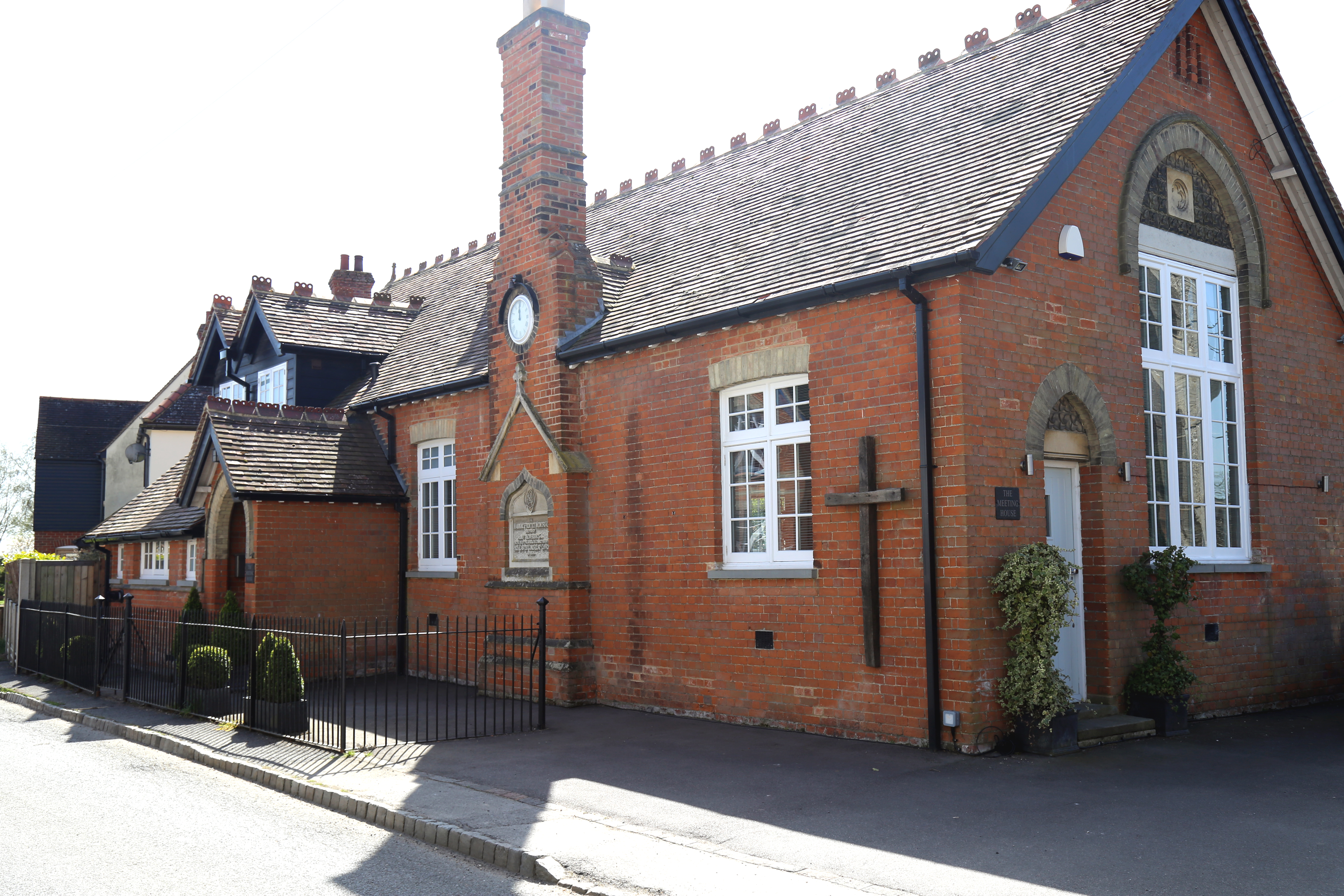
Manning Prentice Memorial School

A further village school was Manning Prentice Memorial School for 100 mixed children, with an average attendance of 73; this school, erected in 1893, was attached to the Congregational chapel which had seating for 300. Parish occupations in 1895 included a tailor & draper, a blacksmith, two wheelwrights, one of whom was also a carrier, two grocers, one of whom was also a draper and an agent for W. A. Gilbey wine and spirit merchants, a saddler & harness maker, a beer retailer, a shoe maker, a miller using wind and steam, eight farmers, two of whom were landowners and one a carrier, two licensed victuallers of public houses, and two farm bailiffs.

Quoting the archeologist Miller Christy, J. Charles Cox wrote in his 1909 guide book Essex (The Little Guides): "In and around the Easters are many old farmhouses of timber and plaster, formerly residences of greater consequence than at present; many are moated and have large or ornamented brick chimneys".

== Geography ==
The village is situated approximately 75 metres above sea level and lies just west of the source of the River Can, which flows southeastwards from the village to meet the River Chelmer in Chelmsford.

High Easter is part of an area of Essex villages and parishes known as 'The Easters', which is adjacent to the east of The Rodings villages.

== Community ==
High Easter Village has a post office and cafe, a parish church, a restaurant, a village hall, a football pitch, and a cricket pitch. Within High Easter Parish are 70 listed buildings and structures: houses, farmhouses, cottages, barns and pubs, and also a post office, a brew house, and a gatehouse.

St Mary's Parish Church on The Street in High Easter village is Grade I listed and dates in part to the 12th century.

== See also ==
The Hundred Parishes
