= High Roding =

Village in Essex, England

Coordinates: 51.828056°N 0.324444°E

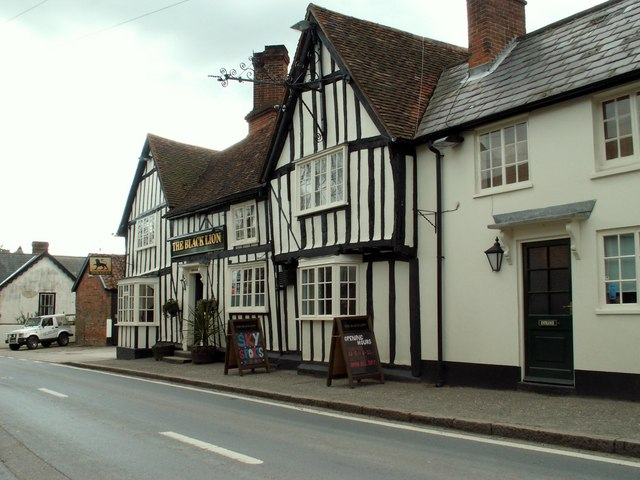
- The Black Lion Inn

- Location within Essex
- Population: 578 (Parish, 2021)
- OS grid reference: TL603173
- Civil parish: High Roding
- District: Uttlesford
- Shire county: Essex
- Region: East
- Country: England
- Sovereign state: United Kingdom
- Post town: Dunmow
- Postcode district: CM6
- Dialling code: 01371
- Police: Essex
- Fire: Essex
- Ambulance: East of England

High Roding or High Roothing is a village and civil parish in the Uttlesford district of Essex, England. The village is included in the eight hamlets and villages called The Rodings. High Roding is 9 miles (14 km) north-west from the county town of Chelmsford. At the 2021 census the parish had a population of 578.

== History ==
According to A Dictionary of British Place Names, Roding derives from "Rodinges" as is listed in the Domesday Book of 1086, with the later variation 'High Roinges' recorded in 1224. 'Roding' refers to the family or followers of a man called 'Hroth', an Old English person name plus '-ingas', and 'High' refers to its situation. High Roding itself is not listed in the Domesday survey.

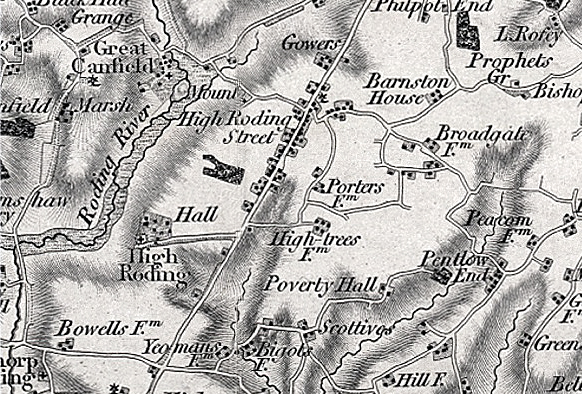
High Roding, Ordnance Survey map 1805

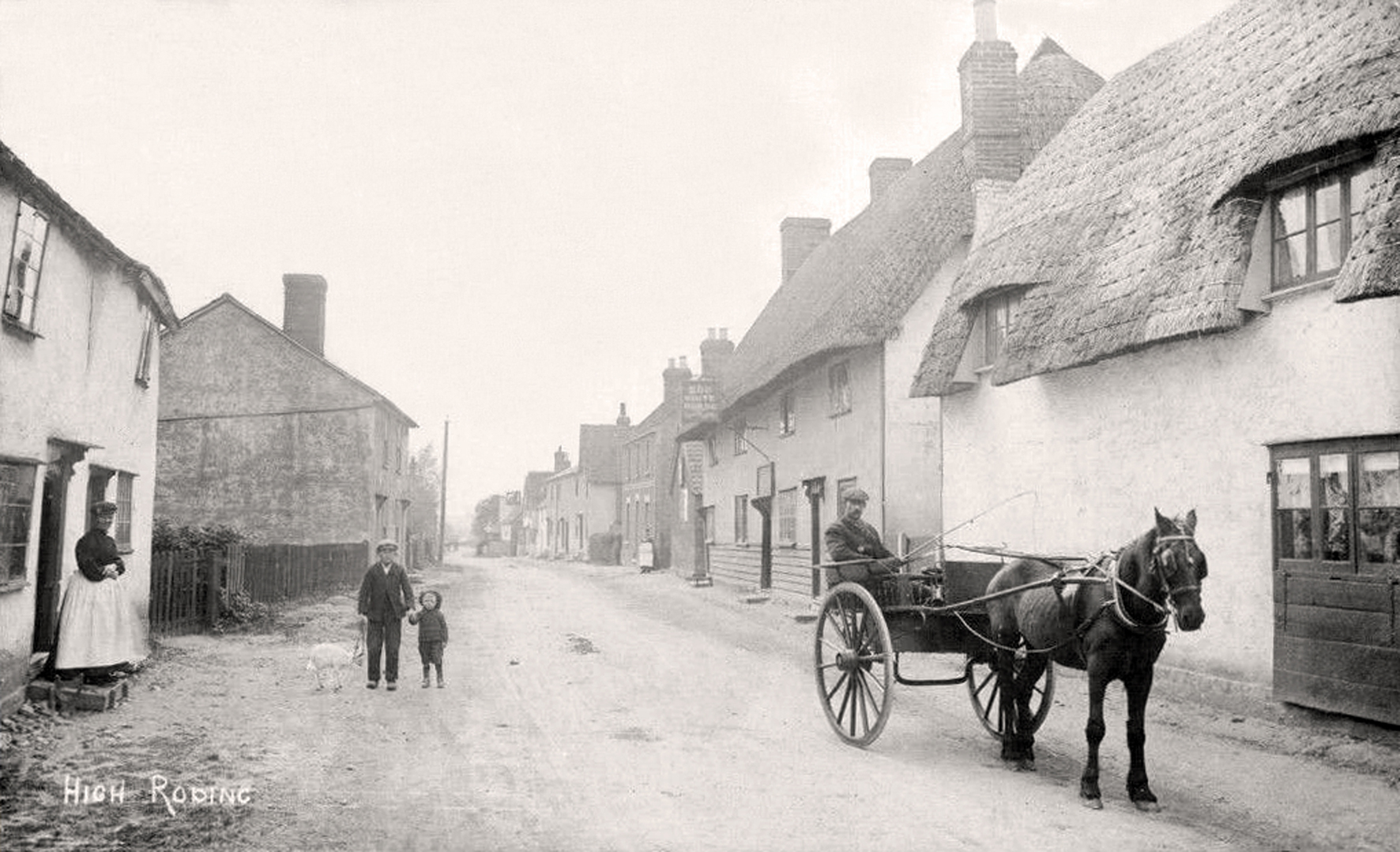
High Roding in 1908

Traditional alternative names for the parish and village include High Roothing and High Rooding, although the parish was contemporaneously referred to with the 'Roding' suffix in trade directories, gazetteers, and in official documents and maps.

The legal name of the parish today is High Roothing, although the parish council uses the spelling High Roding on its website. The Royal Mail uses the form High Roding in official postal addresses.

In the reign of Edward the Confessor, Leofrin gave High Roding manor to a monastery in the Isle of Ely. In the 19th century the parish was in the Dunmow Hundred, and in the Dunmow Union—poor relief provision set up under the Poor Law Amendment Act 1834—and part of the Rural Deanery of Roding. The parish Church of All Saints was restored in 1855 at a cost of nearly £1,000. It is a Grade II* listed building. The church register dates to 1538. The 1882 parish living of a rectory, residence and 24 acres (0.10 km^{2}) of glebe, land used to support a parish priest, was in the gift of John Strange Jocelyn, 5th Earl of Roden who was also the Lord of the manor and the principal landowner until 1897. By 1902 the living was in the gift of William Henry Jocelyn, 6th Earl of Roden, with the Countess of Roden as Lady of the Manor and principal landowner. In 1914 the living was in the gift of the Countess of Roden, who was still the Lady of the Manor but not a principal landowner. There was a Parochial school for boys and girls, built for 86 children in 1861, with an average attendance of 64. By 1914 the school was under the control of the Essex Education (Dunmow District) Sub-Committees.

Parish land in 1882 was of 1,777 acres (7.2 km^{2}). Between 1892 and 1914 parish area remained static. Population in 1881 was 447; in 1891 was 446; in 1901 was 399; and in 1911 was 414. Crops grown at the time were chiefly wheat, barley and beans, on a heavy soil with a clay subsoil.

Parish occupations in 1882 included six farmers, one of whom was a landowner, four farm bailiffs, three beer retailers, the licensee of The Black Lion public house, a miller, a carpenter, a plumber, a baker, a machinist, a blacksmith, three shopkeepers, one of whom was also a tailor and another a hawker, two shoemakers, a grocer & provision dealer, and a bricklayer. By 1894, the number of farm bailiffs had reduced by two, shopkeepers, shoemakers, beer retailers, and farmers reduced by one, although the miller (using wind and steam) was at the time retailing beer. The grocer & provision dealer was then running the Post Office. A carpenter, a bricklayer and the public house licensee still existed, although a plumber was not listed. There were now two blacksmiths, a hawker & carrier—a person who transported trading goods and produce for others, and occasionally people, from place to place, usually by horse and cart—a confectioner, and the proprietress of a ladies' school. In 1902 and 1914 there were no farm bailiffs, hawkers or carriers listed, although a fishmonger was listed in 1902. In 1914 the ladies' school remained. The post office, previously run by the grocer & provision dealer, was in 1902 under the control of the confectioner (who also offered accommodation for cyclists and traps for hire), and in 1914, a baker. Added in 1914 to the earlier lists of occupations were a general dealer, a thatcher, an insurance agent, a cattle dealer, and a police constable who ran the High Roding police station.

High Roding was the subject of a conservation appraisal by Uttlesford District Council in 2014, setting the boundary for management of a High Roding Conservation Area.
