= Berden (disambiguation) =

Berden is a village in Essex, England, UK.

Berden may also refer to:

== People ==
=== Surname ===
- Ben Berden (born 1975), Belgian racing cyclist
- Martijn Berden (born 1997), Dutch footballer
- Tommy Berden (born 1979), Dutch squash player

=== Given name ===
- Berden de Vries (born 1989), Dutch racing cyclist

== Other uses ==
- Berden Hall, Berden, Essex, England, UK; a country house
- Berden Priory, Essex, England, UK

== See also ==
- Burden (disambiguation)
