= Burdon (disambiguation) =

Burdon is a village and civil parish in the City of Sunderland in Tyne and Wear, England.

Burdon may also refer to:

- Burdon (surname), including a list of people with the name
- Burdon Canal Nature Reserve, in Belize District, Belize
- Great Burdon, a village in Darlington, County Durham, England
- Old Burdon, a village in County Durham, England
