= Francis Reid =

British Army officer (1900–1970)

Francis Smith Reid
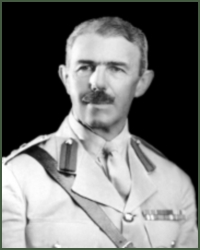
- 200px Francis Reid
- Born: 1900; Bearsden, Scotland
- Died: 1970 (aged 69–70); Scotland
- Military career
- Allegiance: United Kingdom; Ceylon
- Branch: British Army; Ceylon Army
- Rank: Brigadier
- Unit: Royal Artillery
- Commands: Commander of the Ceylon Army, District Officer Commanding Cyprus District, Commander Royal Artillery 78th Division
- Conflicts: World War II
- Awards: CBE

Brigadier Sir Francis Smith Reid CBE, RA (1900–1970) was a senior officer in the British Army during the Second World War and the following years. He was the second Commander of the Ceylon Army from 1952 to 1955. His other commands included Commander, Ceylon Garrison and UK troops in Ceylon (1949–50), Cyprus District (1950–51) and Cyrenaica District (1951–52).

Reid was secretary to the Speaker of the House of Commons. He lived at Berden Hall and is buried in the churchyard of St Nicholas' Church, Berden, Essex.

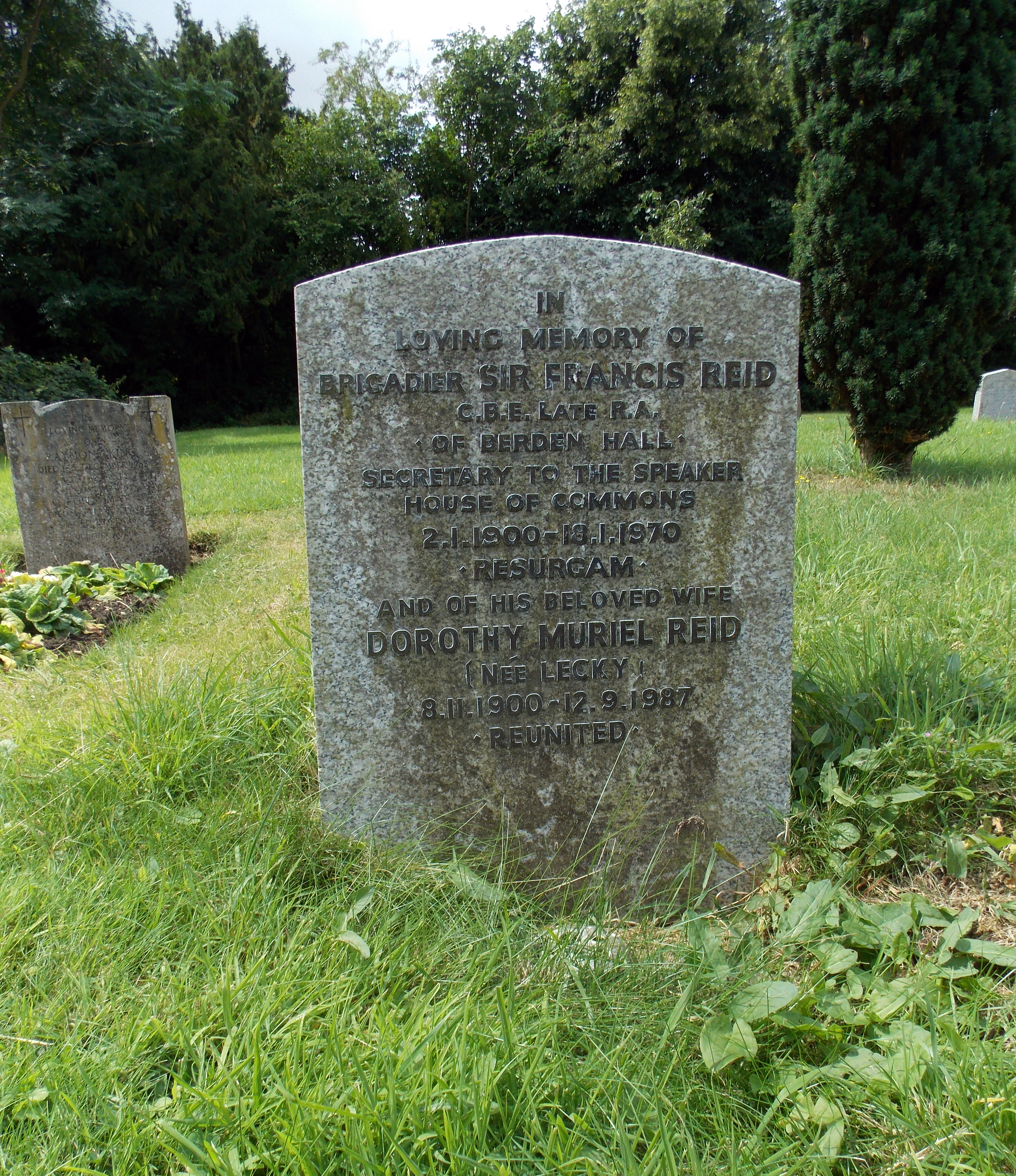
Headstone for Brigadier Sir Francis Reid of Berden Hall, Essex

Military offices
Preceded by James Sinclair, 19th Earl of Caithness	Commander of the Ceylon Army; 1952–1955	Succeeded by Anton Muttukumaru
