= St Nicholas' Church, Berden =

St Nicholas’ Church, Berden
- The Parish Church of St Nicholas
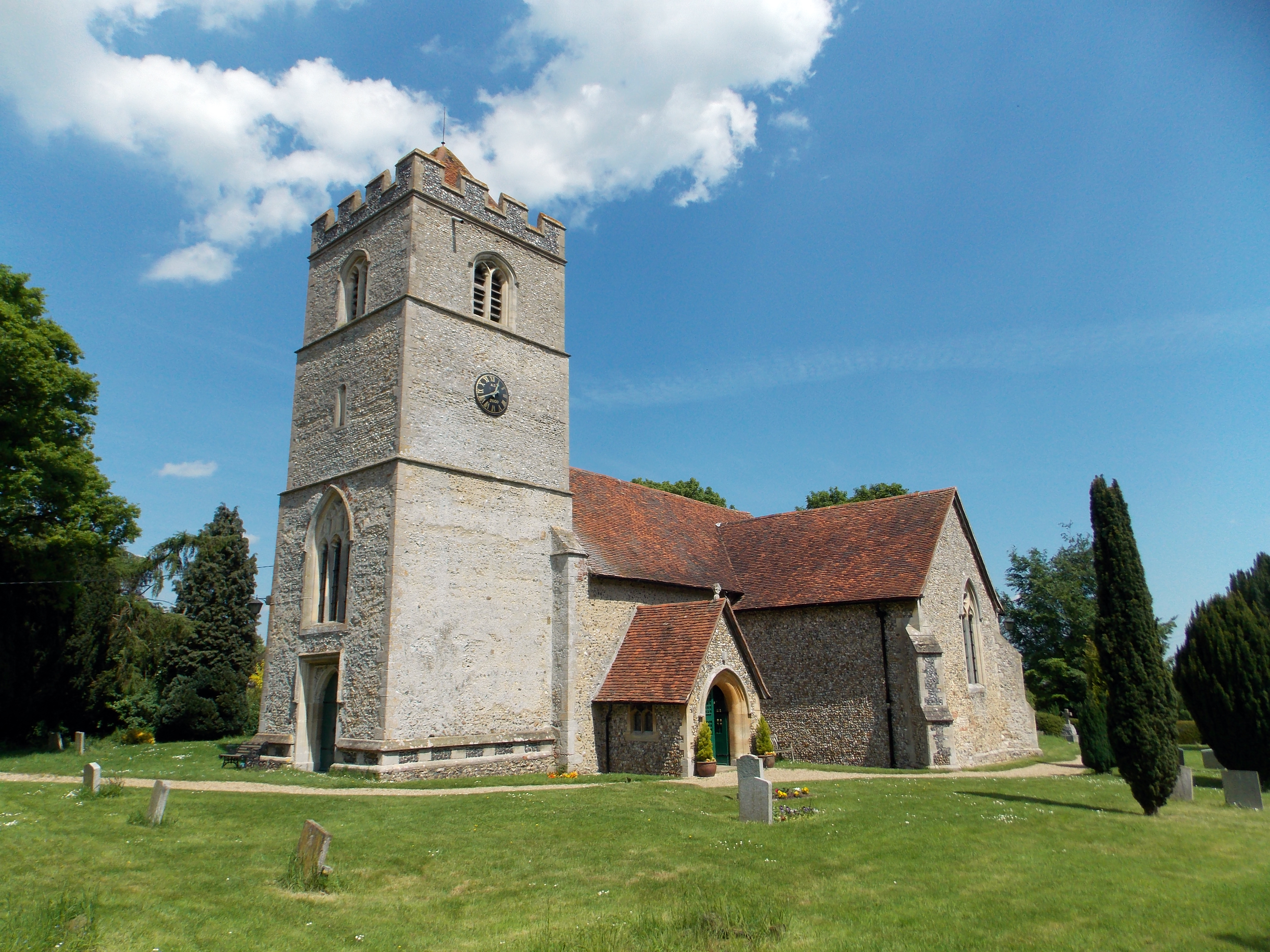
- Church of St Nicholas
- St Nicholas’ Church, Berden
- 51.945796°N 0.13402131°E
- OS grid reference: TL 46769 29630
- Location: Berden
- Country: England
- Denomination: Church of England

History
- Founded: 12th century

Architecture
- Heritage designation: Grade I
- Designated: 21 February 1967
- Architectural type: Early English; Perpendicular

Specifications
- Materials: Flint rubble; clunch; limestone

Administration
- Province: Canterbury
- Diocese: Chelmsford
- Deanery: Saffron Walden
- Parish: Berden

St Nicholas' Church is a Grade I listed parish church in the village of Berden, Essex, England.

Of the Early English Gothic style, the church has a Norman nave with 13th-century transepts and a tower dated to the 15th century. It underwent major restoration in 1868.

The church held a 20th-century 38-year revival of a "Boy Bishop" miracle play. It contains memorials to significant families of the local Berden Hall and Berden Priory, and to a murdered Berden parish constable.

St Nicholas' is part of a joint benefice—sharing a common priest— in the Deanery of Saffron Walden of the Diocese of Chelmsford. Other churches in the group are St Mary the Virgin at Manuden; St Simon and St Jude at Quendon; and All Saints at Rickling.

== History ==
No church or priest for Berden is mentioned in the 1086 Domesday Book. St Nicholas' parish register dates from 1715.

The present church nave dates from the 12th century, with the chancel and transepts from the 13th, and the tower from the 15th. The chancel was rebuilt in part, and the church restored, in the 19th century at which time a south porch was added. A complete 1868 restoration was carried out at a cost of £2000. Before the 1868 restoration the church was recorded as containing a north and a south aisle, and a tower of four bells; and in 1818 as containing five bells.

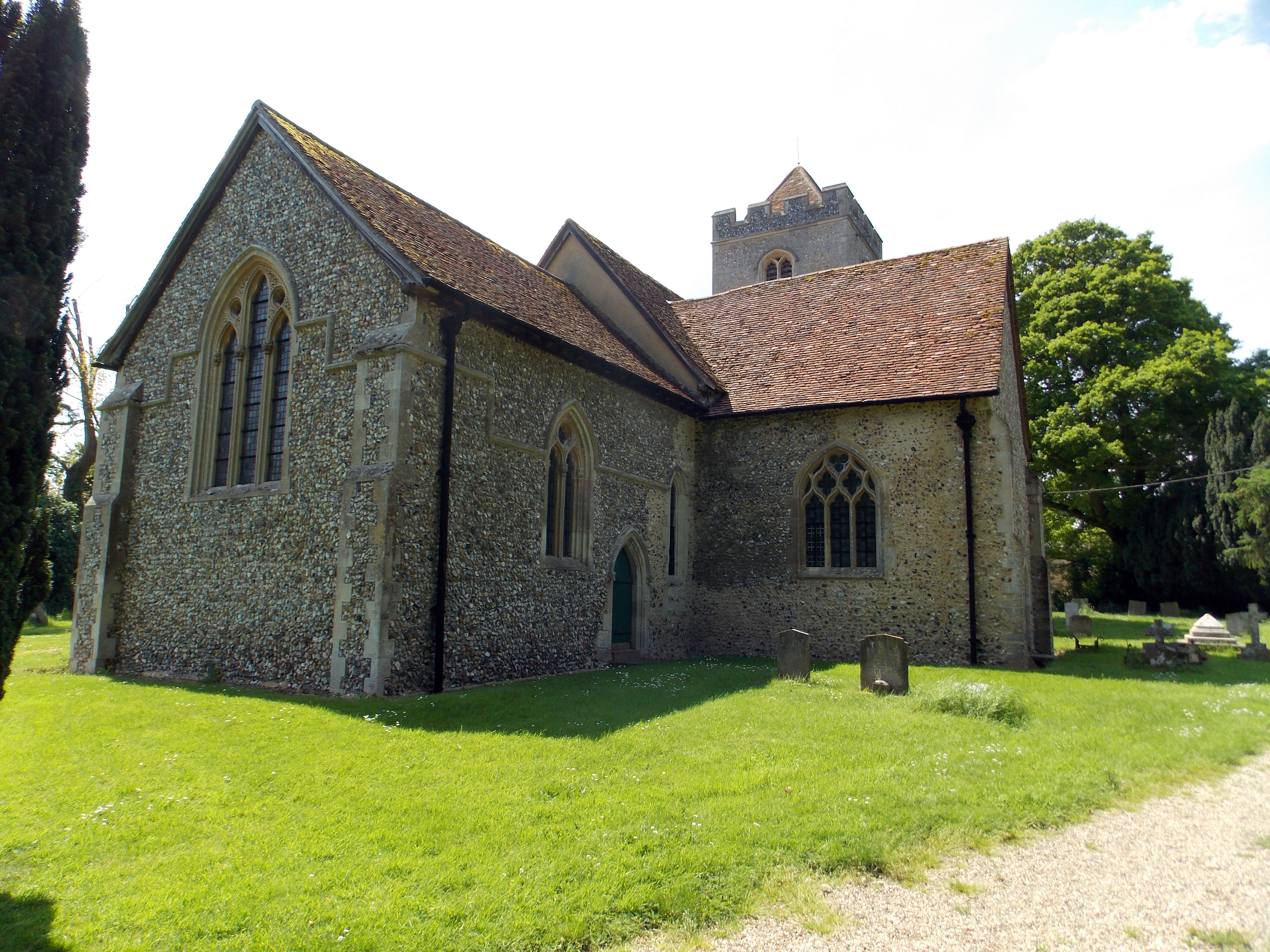
St Nicholas' from the north east with chancel and north transept

The earliest record of a priest at Berden is that of John de Askeby in 1325. At the time of the Church of England's Secession and break with Rome Berden priests were appointed by the Bishop of London. During the 19th century the incumbent priest held his office and living under a vicarage, or a curacy that might have been perpetual or stipendiary. The living of the Rev Frederick Gifford Nash in the mid-19th century had a yearly value of £150, with a further allowance of £18. 10s from Queen Anne's Bounty. He received a residence and 3 acres (1.21 ha) of glebe—land used to support a parish priest—in the gift of Christ's Hospital. By the end of the 19th century the value of the living had not increased, and had only risen slightly to £182 by 1914.

Within the churchyard, to the south-west of the tower, is a stone marker for the grave of Henry Trigg. Trigg was the Berden parish constable at the beginning of the 19th century, and ran a shoe shop adjacent to Berden Hall in the village. On the night of 25 March 1814 two men from Bishops Stortford, a William Pratt and a Thomas Turner, broke into Trigg's shop to thieve leather goods. They were confronted by Trigg and his father. Trigg offered defence by disabling Turner, but after a Pratt attempt to shoot Trigg's father with a double-barrelled gun, both father and son made to escape. Pratt, using the words "Now, damn your heart, I will do for you", then shot Trigg in the chest, killing him. A year later Pratt and Turner were captured by the Bow Street Runners, sentenced to death, and sent to the gallows. The words "In memory of Henry Trigg of this Parish Aged 36 years Who was murdered March 25th 1814 endeavouring to protect his property" were recorded as written on the tombstone. Following the execution of Pratt and Turner, a postscript was reportedly added to Trigg's stone: "March 13th 1815 Wm Pratt, Thos Turner Both of Bishops Stortford, Herts. Were executed at Chelmsford for the above offence on their own confession".

The Rev Herbert Kynaston Hudson, vicar from 1899 to 1937, reintroduced the miracle play and ceremony of the 'Boy Bishop', based on a 15th-century tradition. A boy would take the role of bishop, central to the event celebrating the life of Saint Nicholas, and would hold the 'office' for the year. Hudson set up in 1901 the 'Guild of St Nicholas' for both boys and girls, this to organize the event and elect the 'bishop'. The event was again revived in 1956-57 and between 1961 and 1966. An equivalent election was for a girl as the 'May Queen', who was accompanied by the Boy Bishop and the vicar to the top of the church tower on May Day. Film units from British-Pathé and Gaumont British recorded and screened Berden's Boy Bishop ceremony.

St Nicholas' received an English Heritage Grade I building listing on 21 February 1967.

In 2009 St Nicholas' received a grant of £3000 for tiling and gutter work from the Friends of Essex Churches.

== Architecture ==
=== Exterior ===
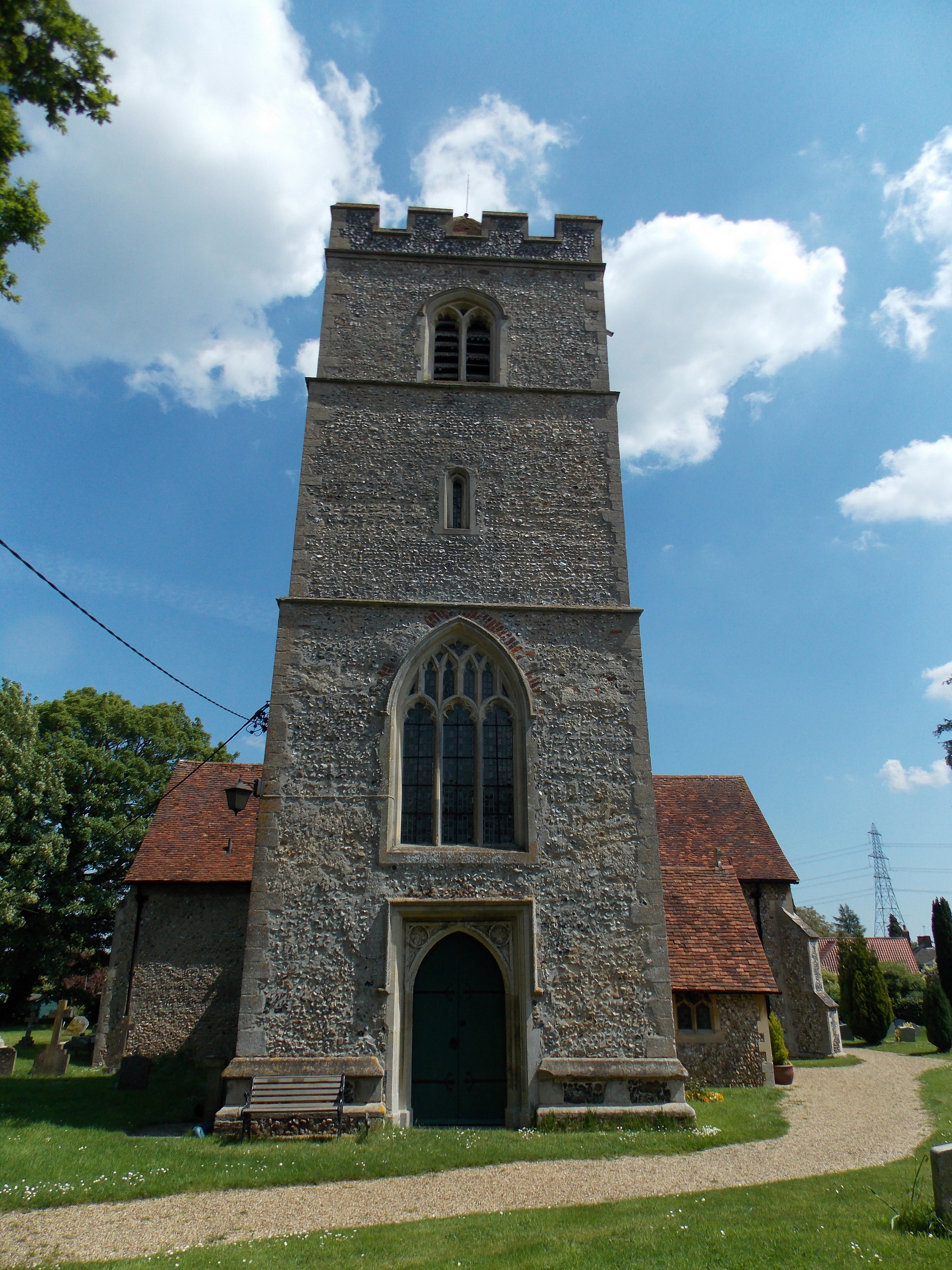
Tower from the west

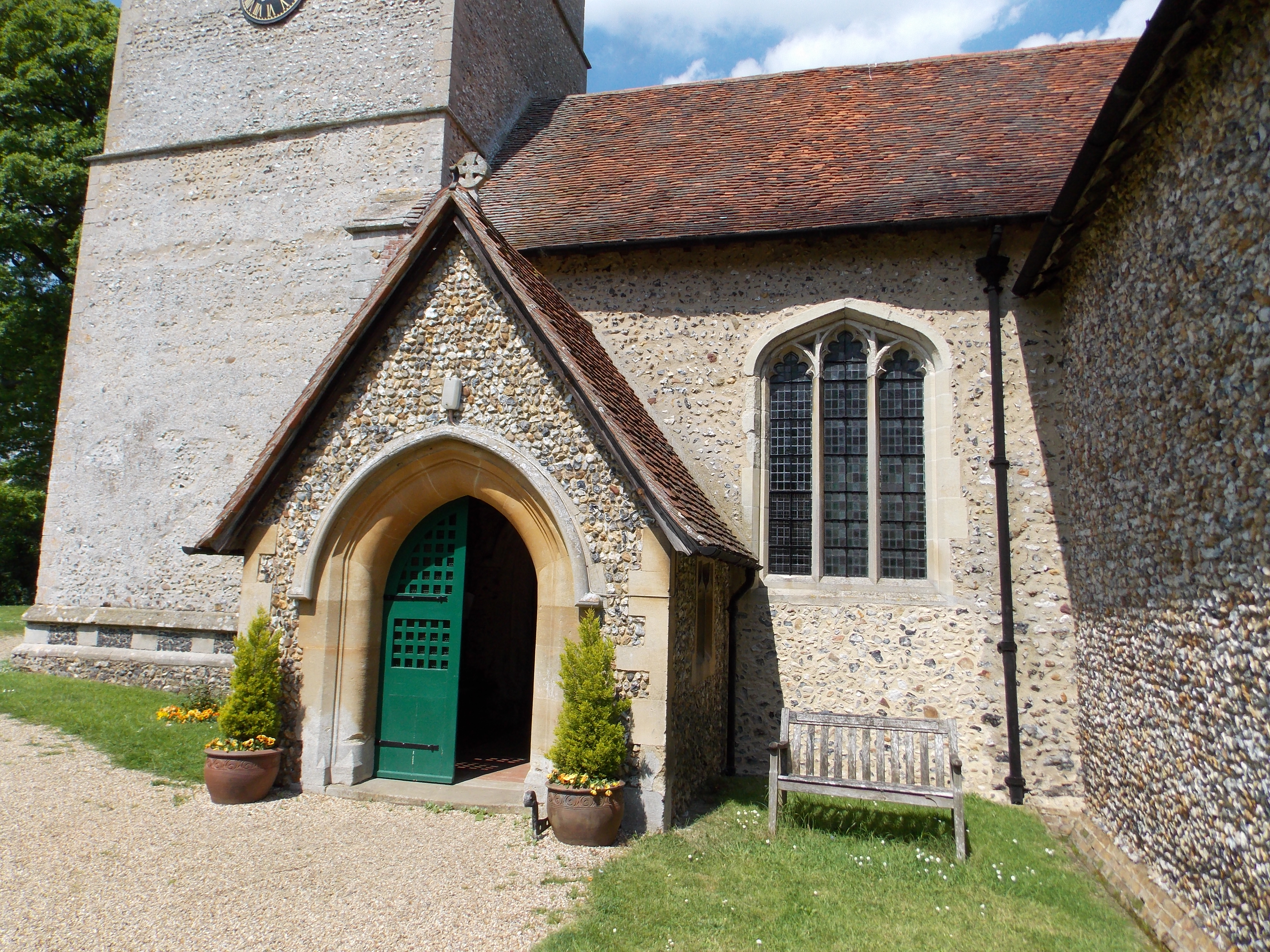
South porch and nave

St Nicholas' is of flint rubble, clunch and limestone construction, and cruciform footprint. It comprises a chancel, nave, north and south transepts, a west tower and a south porch, and is of Early English and Perpendicular style. The roofs are red tiled throughout.

The church's 15th-century three-stage tower is of Gothic Perpendicular style. Of approximately 12 feet (4 m) square in footprint, the bottom stage contains a door and window on its west face. The restored 15th-century door, faced with decorative hinges, is set within a chamfered arch topped by a rectilinear enclosure; between this and the arch are spandrels with inset rosettes containing quatrefoils. Around the top of the squared surround is a rectilinear hood mould. Above the door is a restored 15th-century Perpendicular pointed arch window set within a chamfered reveal. The window is of three lights up to the outer arch spring, each ending in a trefoil-headed arch. Above the lights is panel tracery—a Perpendicular style of upright straight openings above lower lights—leading to further arches. Around the window opening arch is a hood mould. The second tower stage west side, slightly set back, contains a narrow arrowslit window rebated within an arch, possibly 15th-century. Above the apex of the window opening is a small round stone with a carved diagonal cross inset. On the south face is a c. 2000 tower clock; circular, convex, and with gold numerals. The belfry third stage, set back again, contains a restored 15th-century window opening on all sides, all of two lights with trefoil heads, louvred, and ending in a flattened pointed arch with hood mould. The tower parapet is deeply embattled. Inset behind the battlements is a four-sided pyramid stub spire. An angled buttress runs almost to the height of the first stage at the nave ends of the north and south sides—English Heritage states there are no tower buttresses. From the bases of the buttresses is a simple moulded socle (plinth) topped by a cill band—angled projection that allows water to flow from a building face— running around the tower.

The nave is approximately 44.5 feet (14 m) east to west and 20 feet (6 m) north to south. The north side contains a 19th-century window with arched lancets and a twin-stepped angle buttress. Running off the nave south side is the 1868 porch, with door set within a deeply rounded arch opening with a following hood mould above. On both east and west sides is a small twin-light window with ogee trefoiled head arches within a rectilinear frame. The porch roof is steeply pitched and surmounted by a cross of Celtic appearance. Within the porch, to the right of the nave door opening is a 15th-century stoup with worn basin within a pointed recess. Immediately to the east of the porch is three-light flat-arched window with cinquefoil heads, dated to the 15th century with reused 13th-century material.

Attached between the nave and chancel are north and south transepts. The north transept is 18.5 feet (5.6 m) east to west, and 15.5 feet (4.7 m) north to south. It has a 19th-century window of three lights below tracery on both the east and north walls, both within a 14th-century opening. To the west of the north window is a 13th-century arched doorway, above which is a small niche with trefoil head. The south transept is 18.5 feet (5.6 m) east to west, and 19 feet (5.8 m) north to south. It contains on its east side a restored 14th-century window with ogee-headed twin lights and tracery within a square head. The south wall 14th-century window is of ogee-headed twin lights and tracery with an arch surround and hood mould. The south transept has twin-stepped diagonal buttresses.

The Chancel is 24 feet (7 m) east to west, and 17 feet (5 m) north to south. The east chancel window, part of the 1868 restoration, is of three lights, the centre light running to the chamfered window arch, the outer lights running to the window arch spring. The mullions have three part circular shafts as dressing sitting on moulded bases, topped with floriated capitals. Above the two outer lights are quatrefoil rosettes set within fields of filigree style. A hood mould joins a 19th-century horizontal cill band, which runs across the wall face and continues in stepped fashion across east wall corner twin-stepped angle buttresses, and around the north and south chancel walls. The north and south chancel windows are of the same style, but of two lights. The north wall also contains a further c. 1270 single-lancet arched window, and an arched door way of the same date with the arch surrounded by a hood mould with personified carved label stops.

=== Interior ===
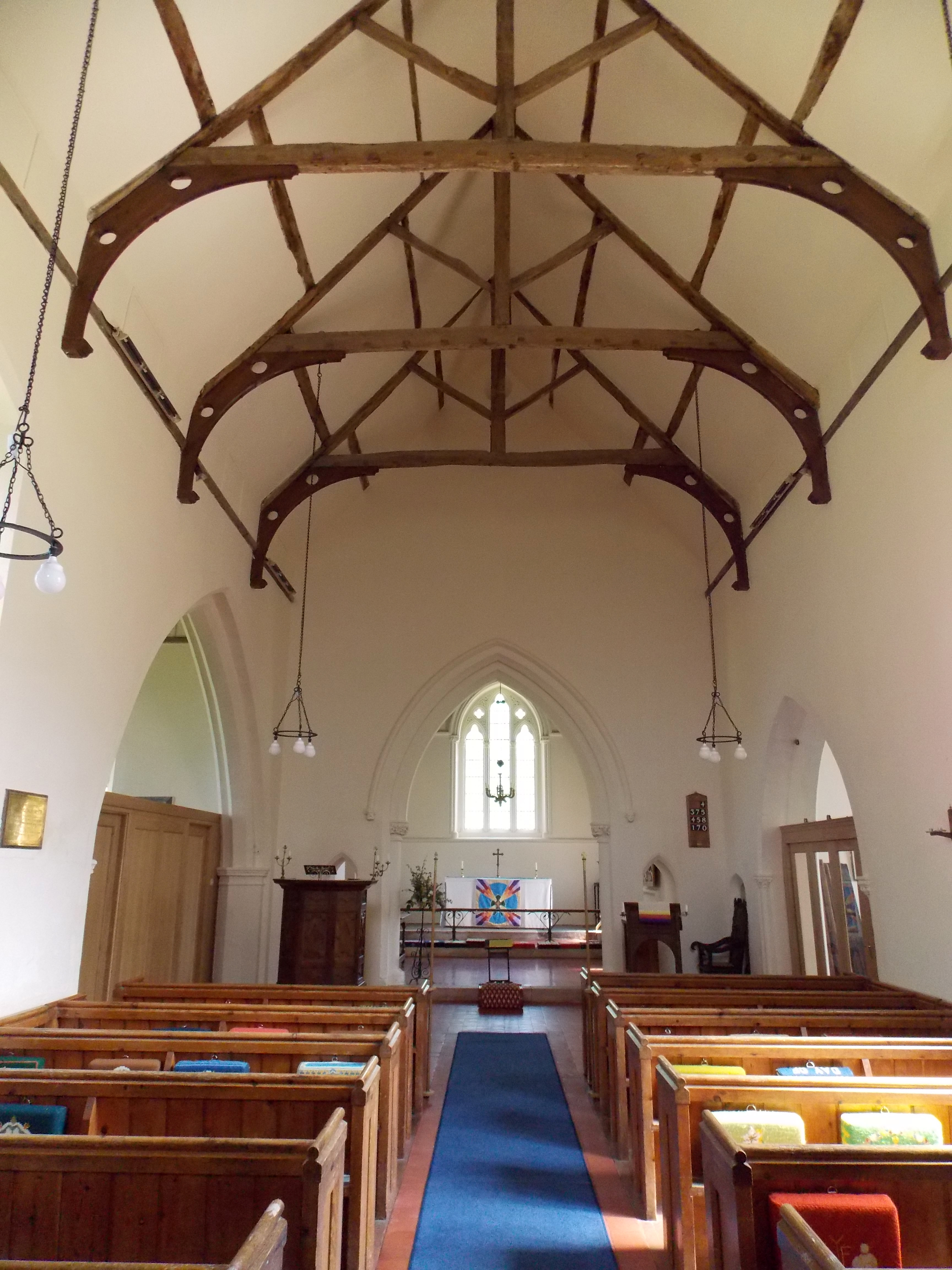
Nave and chancel from tower arch

The church walls and ceilings are rendered and painted white throughout. All windows are glazed with translucent rectilinear glass panels, in clear, red or blue. All flooring is plain red tiling except on the raised chancel sanctuary behind the altar rail where there is added bands of black, white and brown. The chancel east window is part of the 19th-century restoration, but with the use of a c. 1270 capital detail. The c. 1270 chamfered rebated chancel arch has a hood mould finished with human head label stops on both chancel and nave sides. Set within the arch is a further chamfered arch supported by responds—half-piers attached to walls supporting an arch—of semi-circular columns with flat-face faceted moulded bases, and foliate capitals that have been part-restored. A 19th-century-added arched squint is on each side of the chancel arch, each with a chamfered rebate as part of the arch. Set above each squint on the chancel side is a gable as moulding with, at its spring and point, a carved foliated detail. Within the chancel is a 14th-century piscina containing a quatrefoil shaped drain.

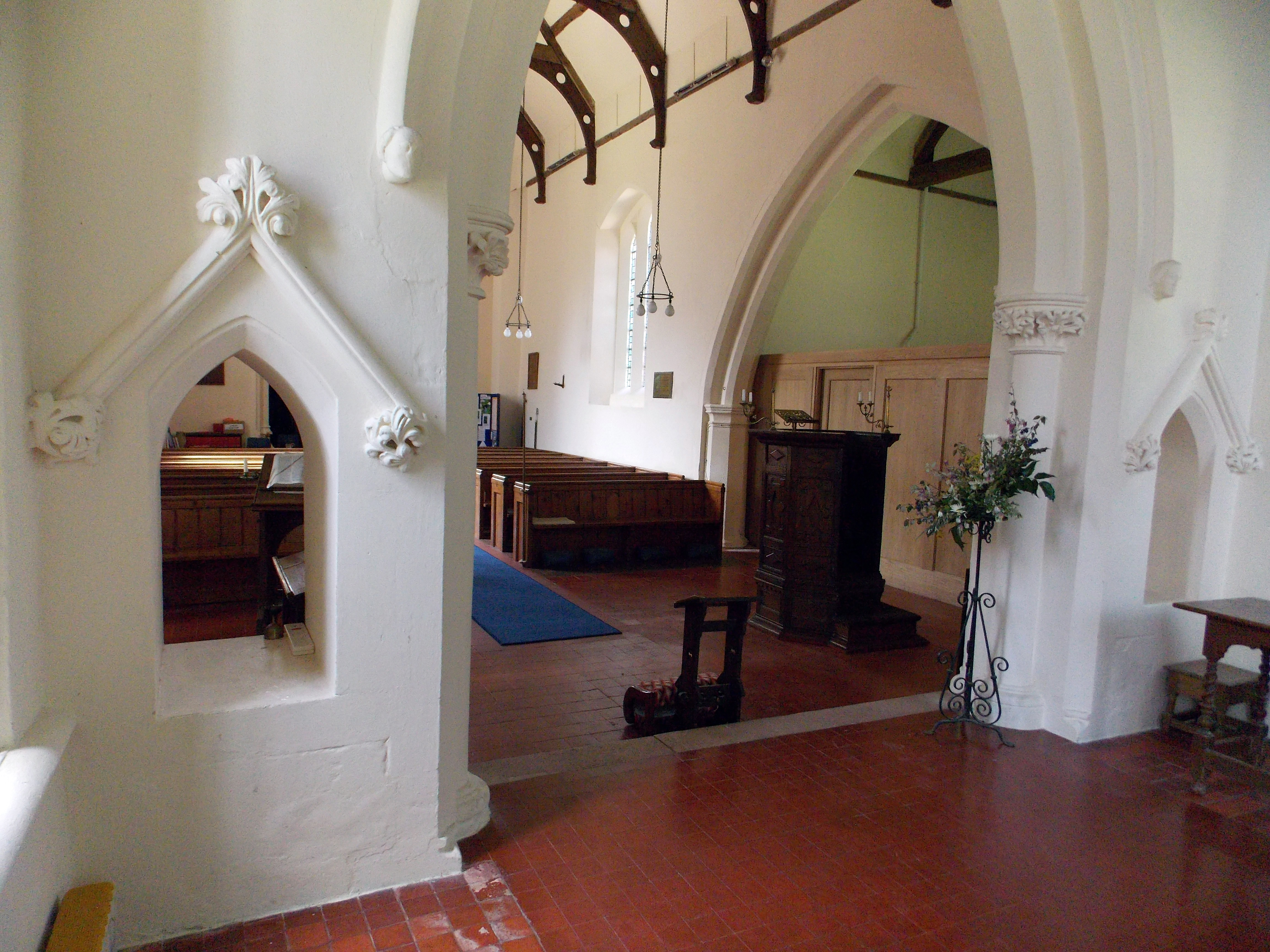
Chancel arch with squint niches

The north transept (or Priory End) windows, east and north, are 19th century but within 14th-century openings. The trussed roof is possibly 16th century with tie beam support added in the 19th. The south transept (or Hall End) east and south windows are 14th century although partly restored. The 15th-century south transept roof trussing is of hammer beam construction, with curved collar braces springing from beams which are supported by curved chamfered brackets. Running on the wall from the hammer beams to the roof line are wind braces, and to the ridge beam is roof truss framing. Both transepts are separated from the nave by c. 20th-century panels and doors rising part way to the top of the arches. The north transept is solid panelling; the south with clear glazed doors to its full width. The north transept is today used as the church vestry room, and the south transept a meeting room with modern furniture. On the south wall of the south transept is a 14th-century piscina with a recessed trefoiled head, a re-cut quatrefoil drain, a head of a woman in a wimple carved at its apex, and a finial above.

The nave is 13th century in origin, but was rebuilt in the 14th. At the west of the north wall is part of a 12th-century window, now blocked and not visible outside, abutted to the tower wall. The north wall window is 19th century within a 14th-century opening. At the east of the nave is an arch leading to the north transept. This chamfered arch was reused when the nave was widened in the 14th century, and is supported by semi-octagonal responds added in the 19th. The nave south wall arch to the south transept is 13th century, chamfered, with square responds. Between this transept arch and east wall is a blocked 15th-century doorway that led to the loft above a former rood screen. The part-restored south three-light window is late 15th century, but using some material from the 13th. To the west of the window is the south doorway with moulded arch and hood mould. Between the south door and the tower wall is part of a 12th-century window, blocked, as mirror image to that on the north wall.

At the west of the nave within the tower arch is the 1780 church organ with part of a 15th-century three-panelled screen set in front as part of the organist's chair—this screen may have come from neighbouring Berden Hall. Within the nave against the north wall of the chancel arch is an octagonal oak pulpit with ornamented panelling taken from an earlier 17th-century pulpit. Behind the pulpit on the chancel arch west face is inscribed, in Lomardic capitals, a mason inscription: “Gefrai Limathun” (Geoffrey the Mason). The church octagonal font sits at the west of the nave central to the tower arch, and is plain and painted white, with a plain octagonal wood cover on which sits a floral display.

Tower bells are one each by W. and P. Wightman (1695); J. Keene (possibly 1613); Robert Oldfield (1613); and Thomas Newman of Cambridge.

Church plate includes a 17th-century repoussé silver-gilt paten, with the inscription "Berden Parish, 1768." A 1602 silver-gilt cup with coat of arms, originally secular—a cup not initially made for the church—is of pear shape with a chased bowl, a twisted stem, and a steeple-top cover.

== Memorials ==
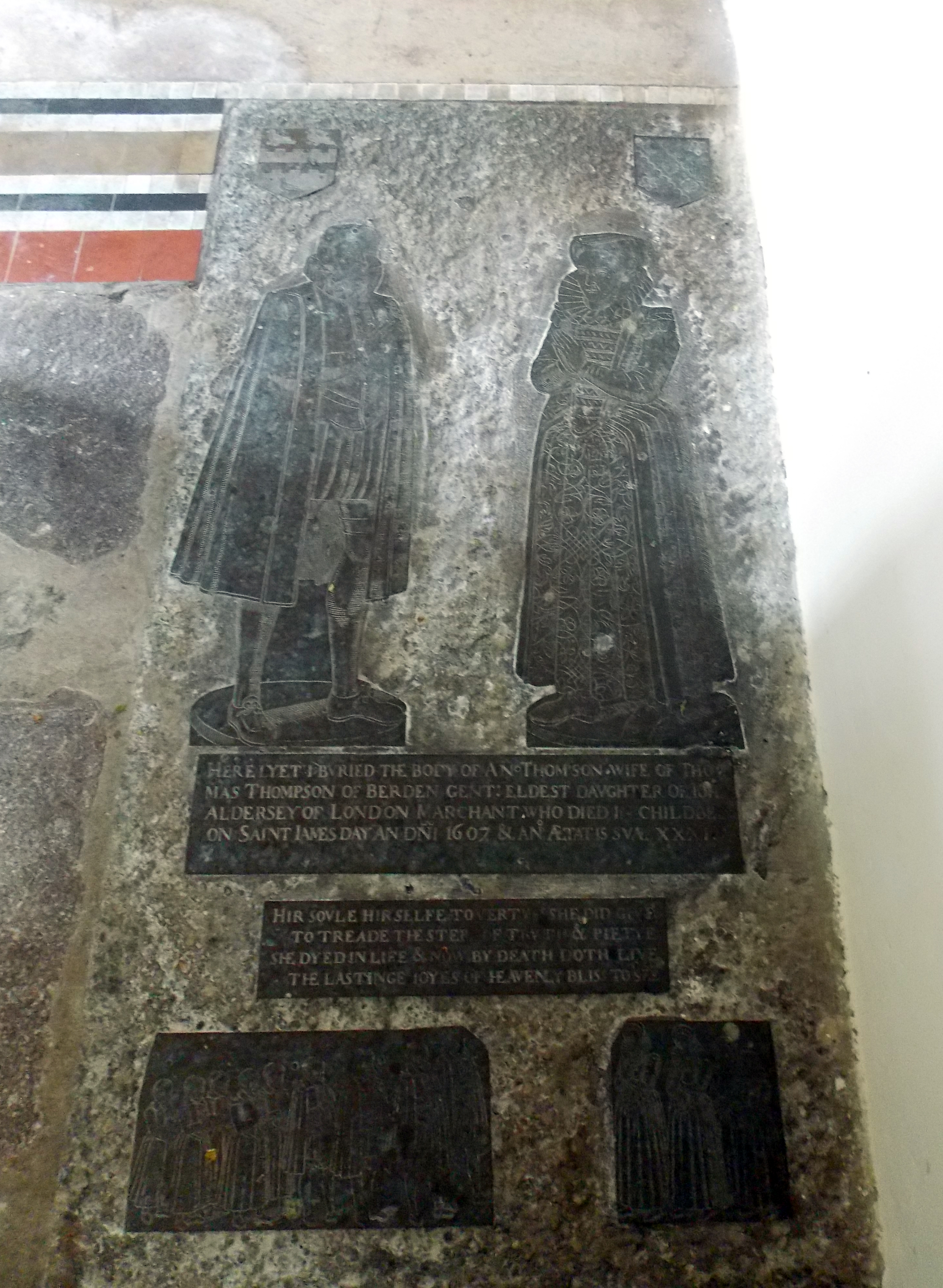
Chancel memorial brass to An Thompson

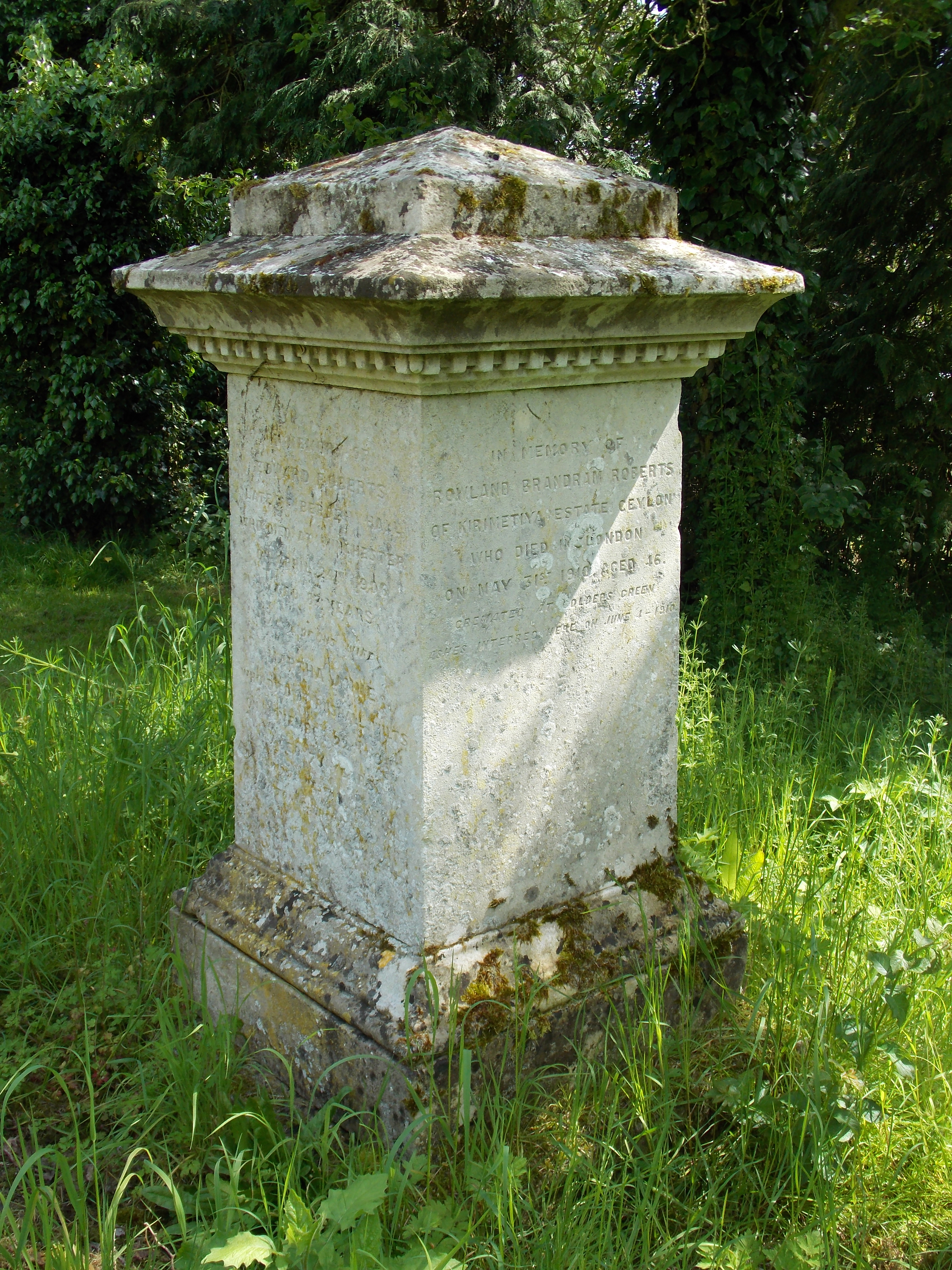
Roberts' plinth tomb

Monumental brasses combined as a one slab memorial next the altar at the north-east corner of the chancel is to An Thompson—the wife of Thomas Thompson—who died in childbirth, aged 31, on 25 July 1607, St James' Day. There are eight plates: one each of an image of a man and woman in Elizabethan dress; two with inscriptions; one depicting their nine sons; one their four daughters; and at the head one shield of arms each over Thomas and An.

On the opposite south-east side is an engraved stone slab to the memory of Dame Mary Scott with, at the top, three coat of arms in lozenge format. Dame Mary died 1678 aged 89 years, and was the daughter of John Aldersey of Aldersey Hall, Cheshire, who was a haberdasher in London—the Alsersey family were the first inhabitants of Berden Hall. She was first married to Thomas Westrowe, a London alderman and grocer. Their son, Thomas Westrow, was an MP for Hythe in the Long Parliament and the Rump Parliament, and was a militia captain in the parliamentary forces. Mary Scott's second marriage, in 1630, was to Sir Norton Knatchbull of Mersham Hatch in Kent. Her third husband was Sir Edward Scott of Scotts Hall at Nettlestead, Kent whom she married after being a widow for 35 years. Her epitaph is: "She was worthily in Great Reputation for piety and zeal in the Reformed Religion for Exemplary Vertue in the Relations of wife and Mother and for Generous Hospitality Bounty and Charity to the full Extent of her Estate. In her Death she was Lamented of all that Knew her."

Also in the chancel, high on the south wall, is a marble and alabaster tablet to Thomas Aldersey of Berden Hall; born in Cheshire, died 1598. The inscription plaque is set within pilasters to the side and a plinth below. Below the plinth is an apron with scrolling and an oval marble inset. Above the inscription is an entablature topped by a circular coat of arms supported and surrounded by scrolling.

In the north-east corner of the north transept are brass plaques to William Turnor, died 1473, and his two wives Margery and Margaret. A brick tomb is also to William Turnor with the "figures of man in fur-edged gown, with belt and bag, and of two women in belted dresses and veiled head-dresses, with inscription and two inscribed scrolls, indents of two shields and figures of children." Further north chancel memorials are to Joseph Hammond, died 1762, with the inscription "Buried near this place lies the body of Joseph Hammond died June 1762 aged 61 years. He was a tender husband, a kind master and true friend. A sincere Christian." Joseph Hammond's wife and son are also memorialised by plaque. A further north transept stone floor slab memorial is to Thomas Meade, died 1653. Meade's brother, Rev Joseph Mede (1586-1639), was born at Berden Priory, educated at Christ's College, Cambridge, and became an English scholar whose 1641 Key of the Revelation became an influential treatise on the Book of Revelation. A worn floor slab to Thomasine, died 1656, the wife of Thomas Meade, lies in the nave. Further north transept memorials are of two coffin lids, one defaced with a part of a raised cross, and the other of Purbeck marble, upturned and used as a wall bracket; both 13th century. A south transept floor slab is to Thomas Grove, died 1669, and his daughter Margaret and his four grandchildren.

On the south wall of the nave is a marble tablet to Colonel John Bury OBE, who was churchwarden of the parish from 1946 to 1961. On the nave north wall is a tablet to Rev Herbert Hudson next to his cross and staff for the 'Boy Bishop' miracle play that he revived. Also on the north wall is a brass plaque to a 33-year-old corporal of the 48th Gordon Highlanders, 1st Canadians, who died at Arras in 1918.

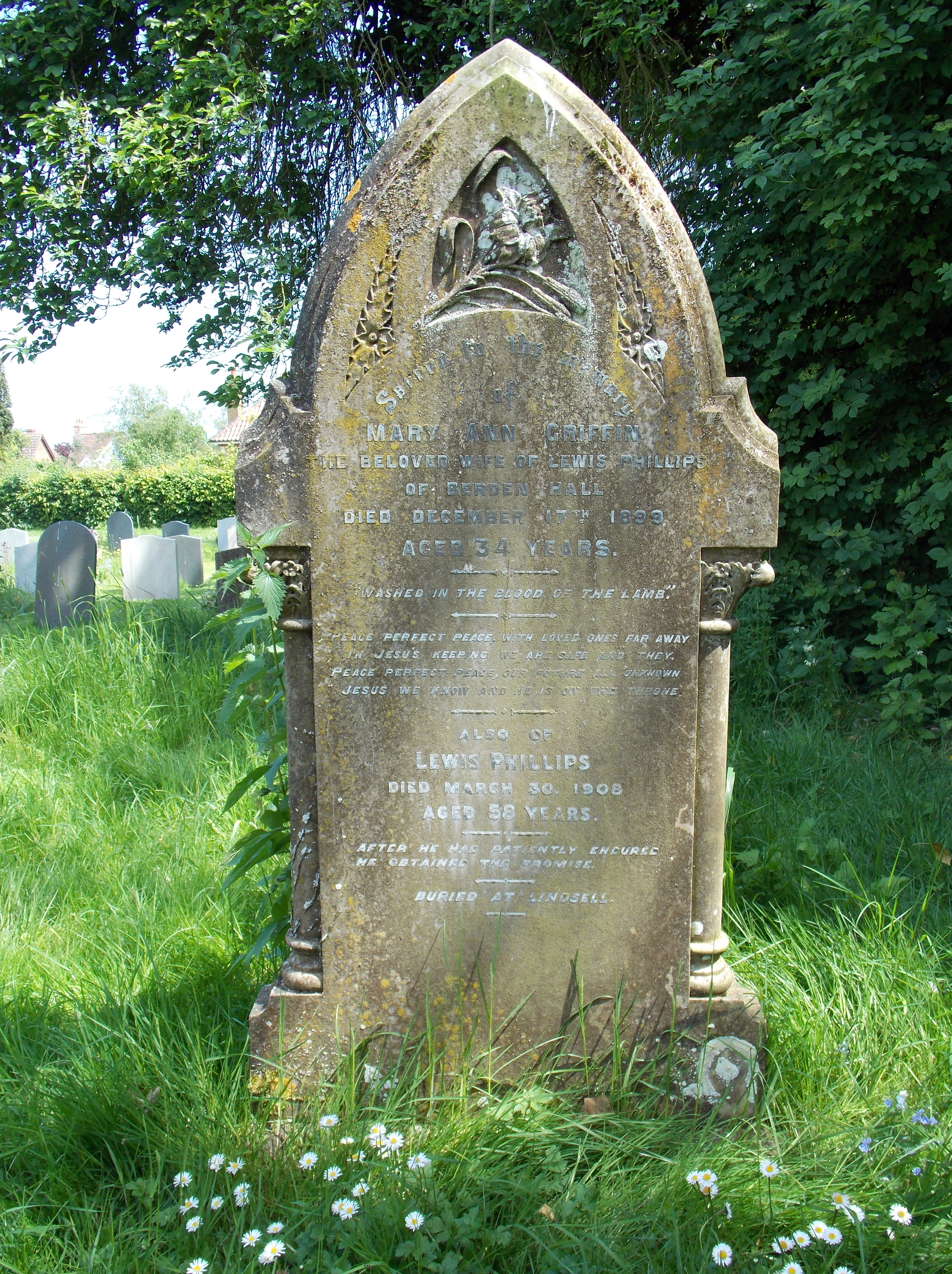
Gravestone to Mary Ann Griffin of Berden Hall

Two individual First World War war graves are in the churchyard: one to Gunner W. Turner (died 12 December 1916, aged 31), Royal Garrison Artillery; and one to Private Ernest A. Knight (died 28 November 1918, aged 28), The Essex Regiment—Ernest Knight was one of Herbert Hudson's Boy Bishops. A war memorial lies in the churchyard to the east of chancel, with names of eleven Berden soldiers of the First, and two of the Second World War.

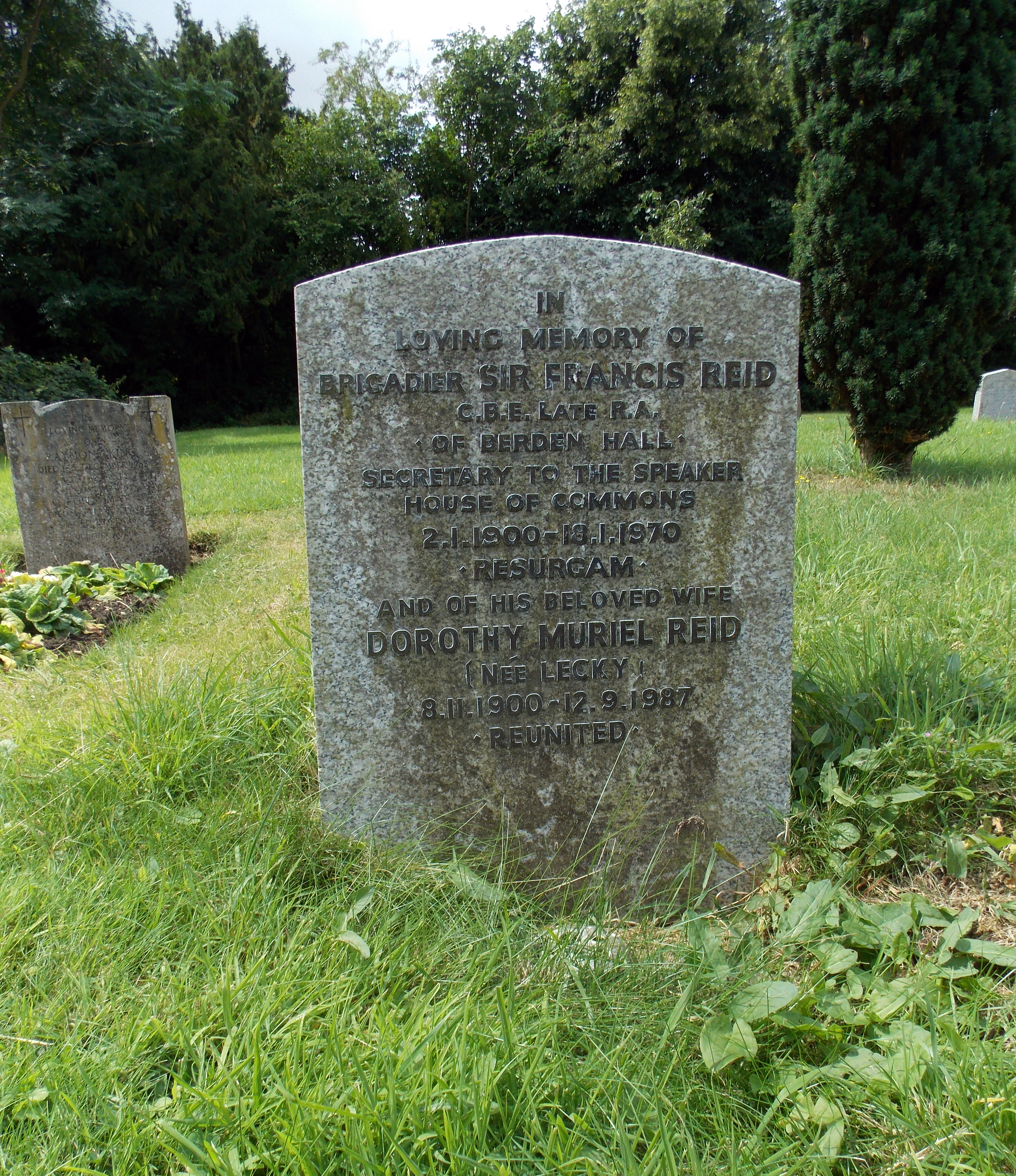
Headstone of Sir Francis Reid of Berden Hall

Further churchyard grave markers are to the murdered parish constable Henry Trigg; to Thomas Beard (died 1800?); and to Mary Ann Griffin (died 1899 aged 34), wife of Lewis Phillips of Berden Hall. The Beard stone contains a serpentine moulding at each side of the top meeting a central circular moulded device, defining three engraved fields, and all with carved pictorial details, the central an angel holding an anchor. An overgrown slab running from the stone contains a similar circular engraved device. The Griffin stone is chamfered-arch topped with inset floral carving, semi-circular side columns topped with floriate capitals, and inlaid inscriptions. Near to the Griffin stone is a plinth tomb with moulded base, and overhanging top with dentils below and a pyramid top. It is to members of the Roberts family, one of whom was Roland Brandram Roberts of Kirimetiya Estate, Ceylon (died 1910 aged 46), who was cremated at Golders Green, with his ashes interred in Berden graveyard. Two marble and granite sarcophagus-style tombs are to the north of the church; one to George Seabrook (died 1885); the other Thomas Seabrook (died 1847) and his wife, Elizabeth (died 1871). George and Thomas Seabrook were of Berden Priory. A further headstone is to Brigadier Sir Francis Smith Reid and his wife. Reid was a senior British Army officer during and after the Second World War, and Secretary to the Speaker of the House of Commons.

== Priests ==
List of priests, and parish rectors, vicars and curates, from the Clergy of the Church of England database, church commemorative plaques and listings, and Post Office and Kellys directories for Essex 1855/1874/1894/1914.

- 1325 – John de Askeby (rector)
- 1333 – Henry Saleman (rector)
- 1362 – Nicolas de Rodeland (rector)
- 1407 – William Wilflete (rector)
- 1428 – Thomas Foster (vicar)
- 1429 – Thomas Bolton (vicar)
- 1438 – Samuel Richardson (vicar)
- 1438 – John Boteler (vicar)
- 1454 – Thomas Taure (vicar)
- 1464 – Richard Baker (vicar)
- 1464 – Thomas Dawe (vicar)
- 1474 – Robert Milver (vicar)
- 1495 – Robert Sherwyn (vicar)

Secession and break with Rome (1534)
(between 1514 and 1536 St Nicholas' vicars had been the priors of Berden, and between 1536 and 1561 Berden curates were appointed by the Bishops of London: John Stokesley; Edmund Bonner; Nicholas Ridley; Edmund Grindal)

- 1554 – Luke Pestell (perpetual curate)
- 1561 – John Yres (curate/reader)
- 1574 – Godfrey Clarke (perpetual curate)
- 1578 – George Parnell BA, Clare Hall, Cambridge (perpetual curate)
- 1592-1598 – Robert Shelford (perpetual curate)
- 1611 – Nathaniel Morris (curate)
- 1631 – John Waite (curate)

Interregnum (1649)
Restoration (1660)

- 1662-1664 – John Beard MA (preacher/curate/schoolmaster)
- 1689 – Benjamin Long (curate)
- 1694-1698 – Joseph Haswell or Hagewell (curate)
- 1698 – John Tomlins BA, St John's College, Oxford (curate)
- 1731 – Peter Selby MA, Trinity College, Cambridge (curate)

Between 1753 and 1846 curates of Berden were rectors of Ugley

- 1753-1785 – Paul Wright BA, Pembroke Hall, Cambridge, MA (curate)
- 1785-1797 – Matthew Field MA, Pembroke Hall, Cambridge (curate)
- 1790 – Christopher Cockbaine BA, Trinity College, Cambridge (curate)
- 1792 – Frederick Maurer BA, Trinity College, Cambridge (curate)
- 1797 – Arthur William Trollope MA, DD (curate)
- 1810 – Thomas Dalton MA, Gonville and Caius College, Cambridge (curate)
- 1815 – George Rix BA Trinity College, Cambridge (stipendiary curate)
- 1815-1817 – Launcelot Pepys Stephens MA, Pembroke Hall, Cambridge (perpetual curate)
- 1817 – John Rogers Pitman BA, Pembroke Hall, Cambridge, MA (perpetual curate)
- 1826 – James Cooper MA, Gonville and Caius College, Cambridge (curate)
- 1846 – Charles Cooke (vicar)
- 1852 – Frederick Gifford Nash MA, Pembroke College, Cambridge (vicar)
- 1875 – William Johnstone (vicar)
- 1891 – Frederick Corden Nash MA, St Catharine's College, Cambridge (vicar)
- 1899 – Herbert Kynaston Hudson MA, Wadham College, Oxford (vicar)
- 1938 – Patrick McLaughlin (vicar)
- 1943 – Wilfred Reese-Wright MSc, PhD (vicar)
- 1949-1954 – Christopher Candler (vicar)
- 1955 – Robert G Rickells (vicar)
- 1960 – Bernard A Whitford (vicar)

The benefice of Berden united with that of Manuden in 1961

- 1973 – John Gutteridge (vicar)
- 1976 – Paul R Masterson (vicar)
- 1986 – Christopher Bishop (vicar)
- 2017? – Margaret Davis (vicar)

== Gallery ==
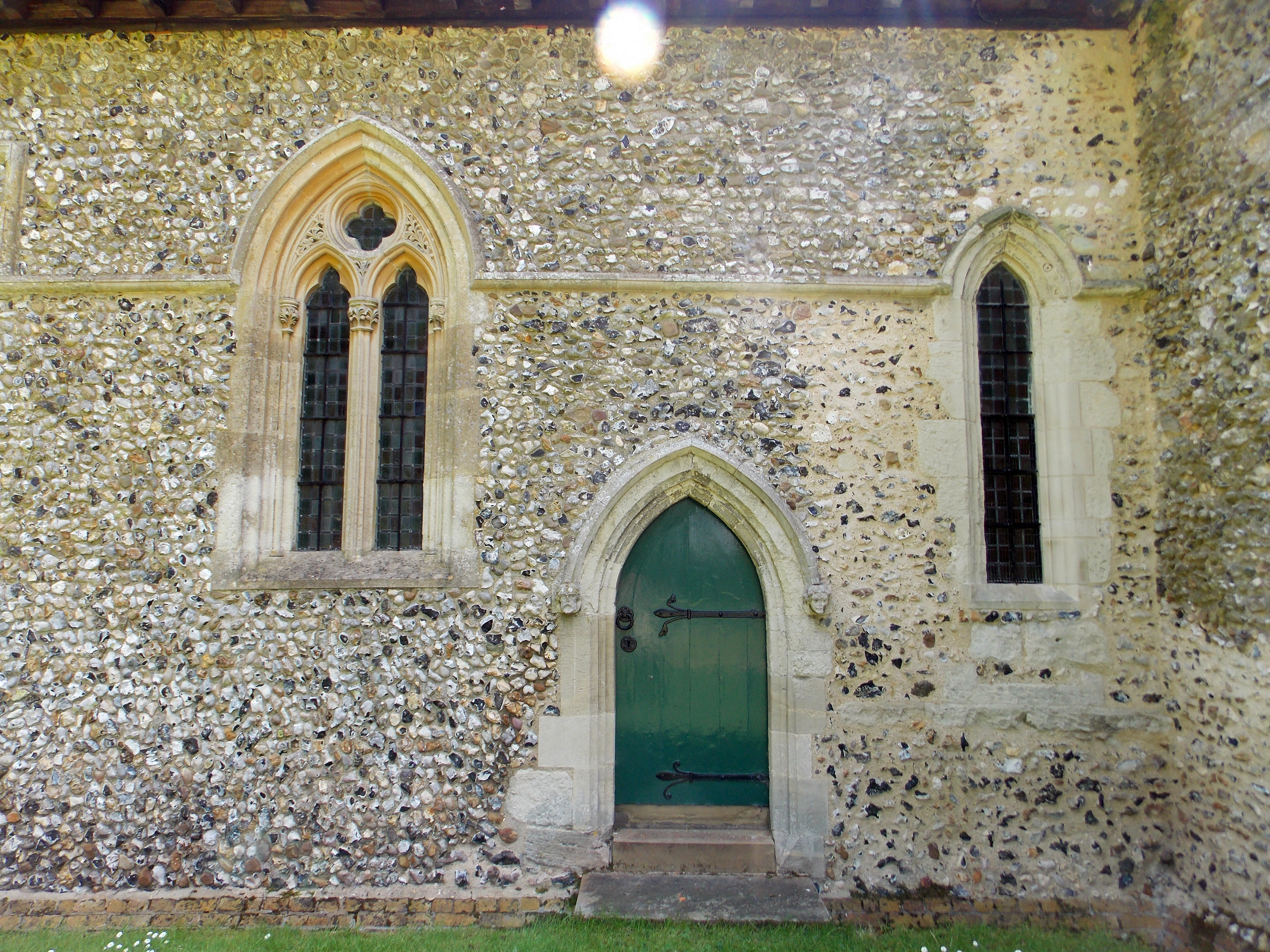
Chancel north wall

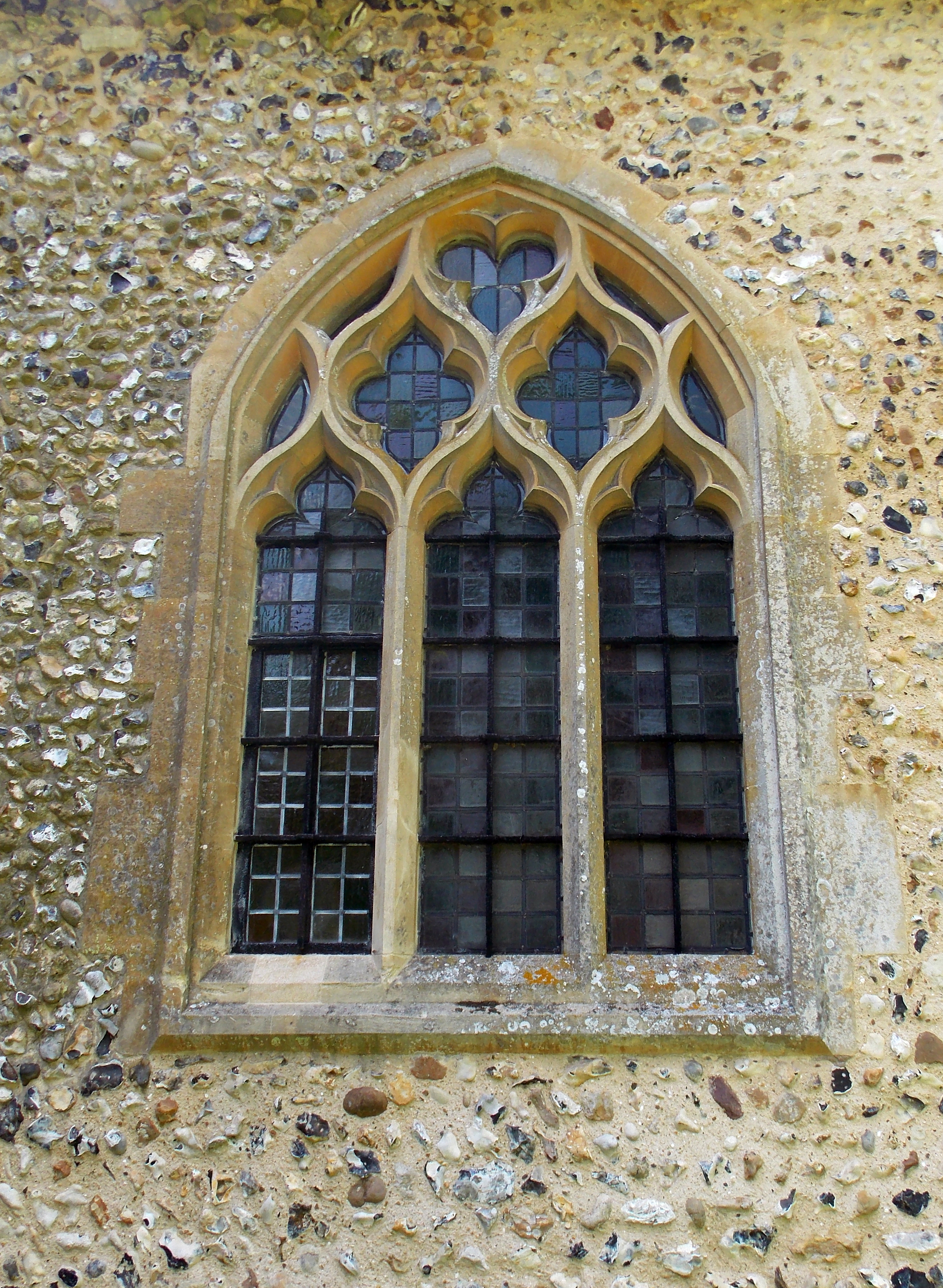
North transept east window

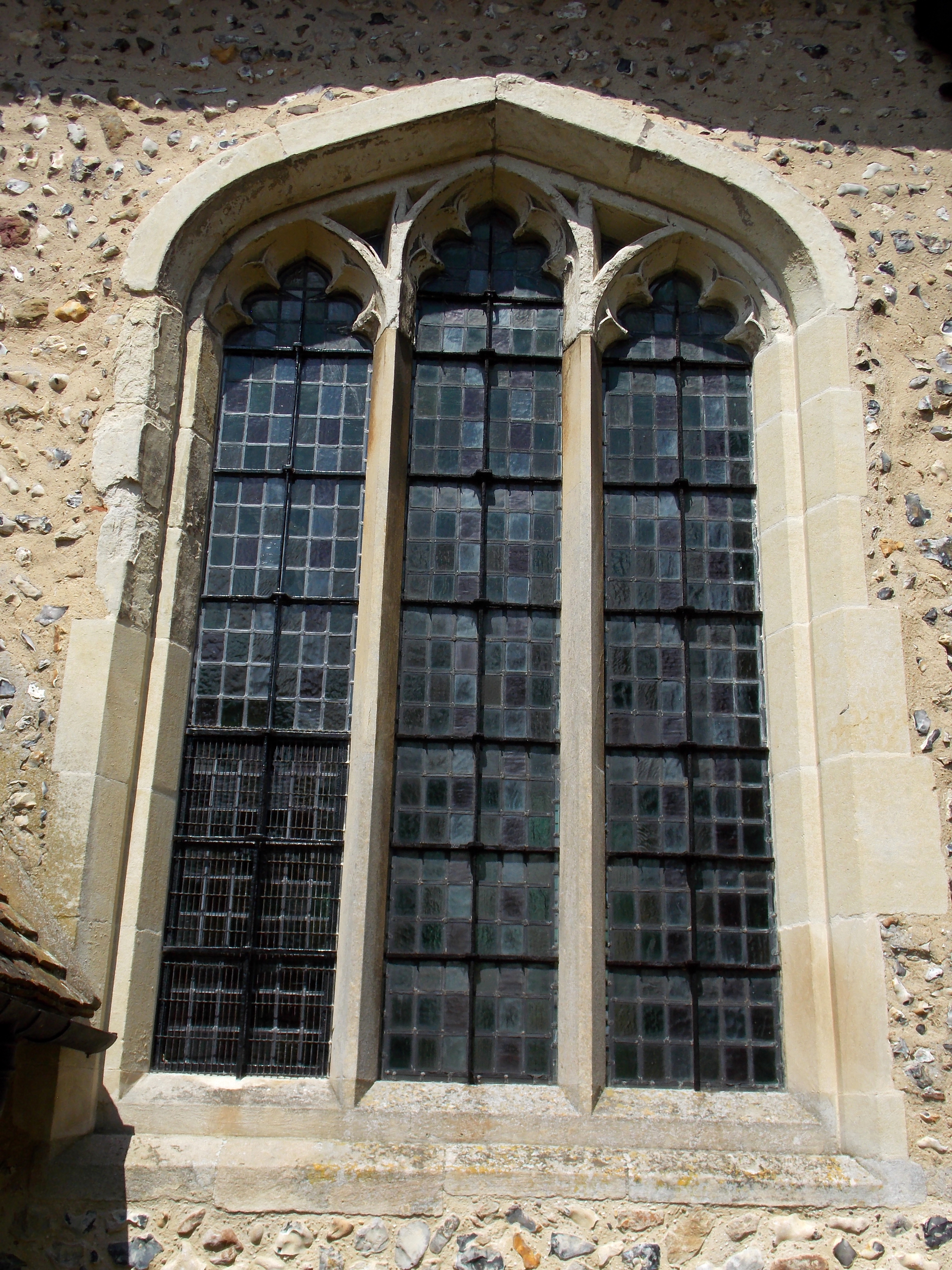
Nave south window

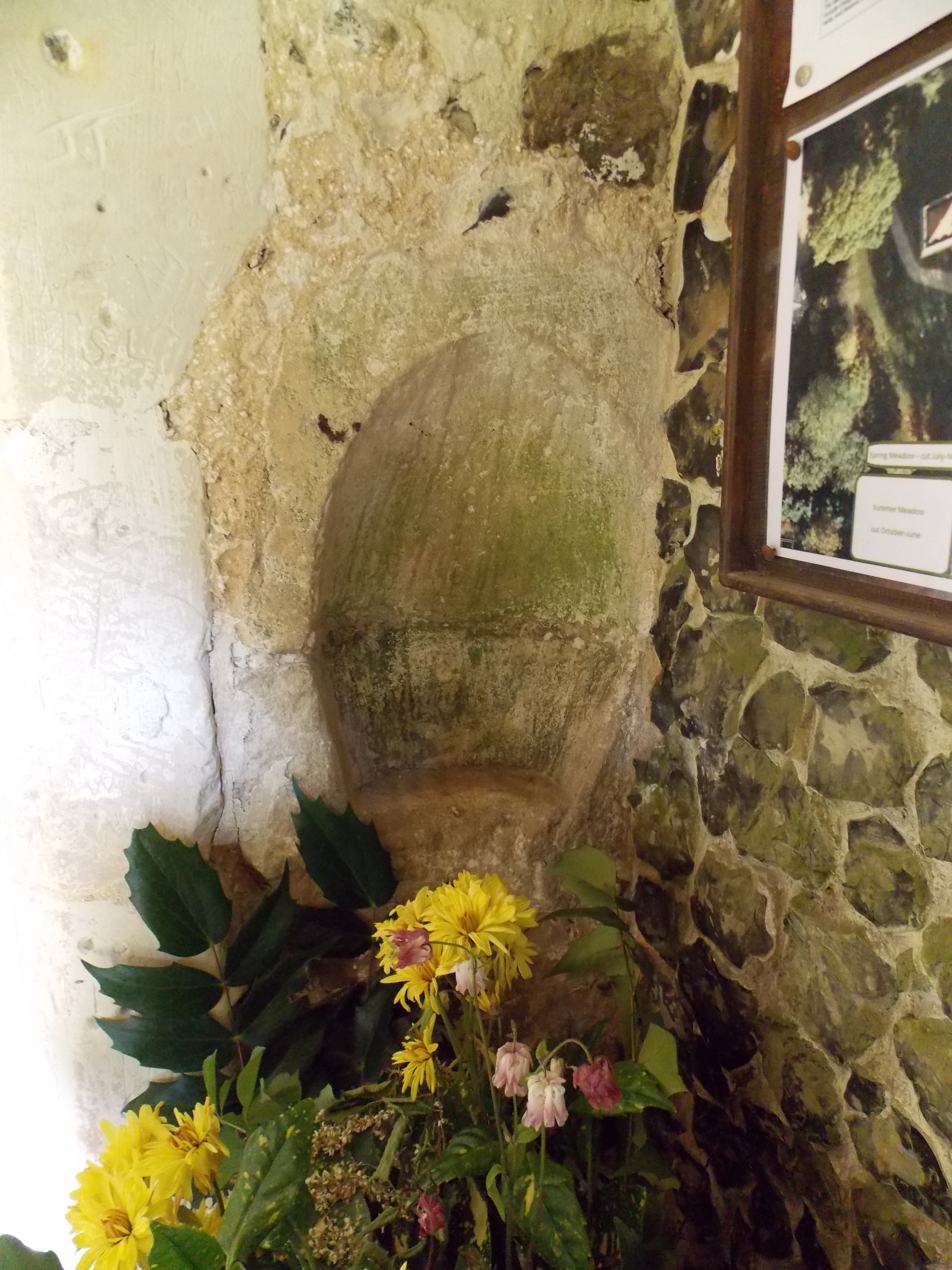
South porch niche

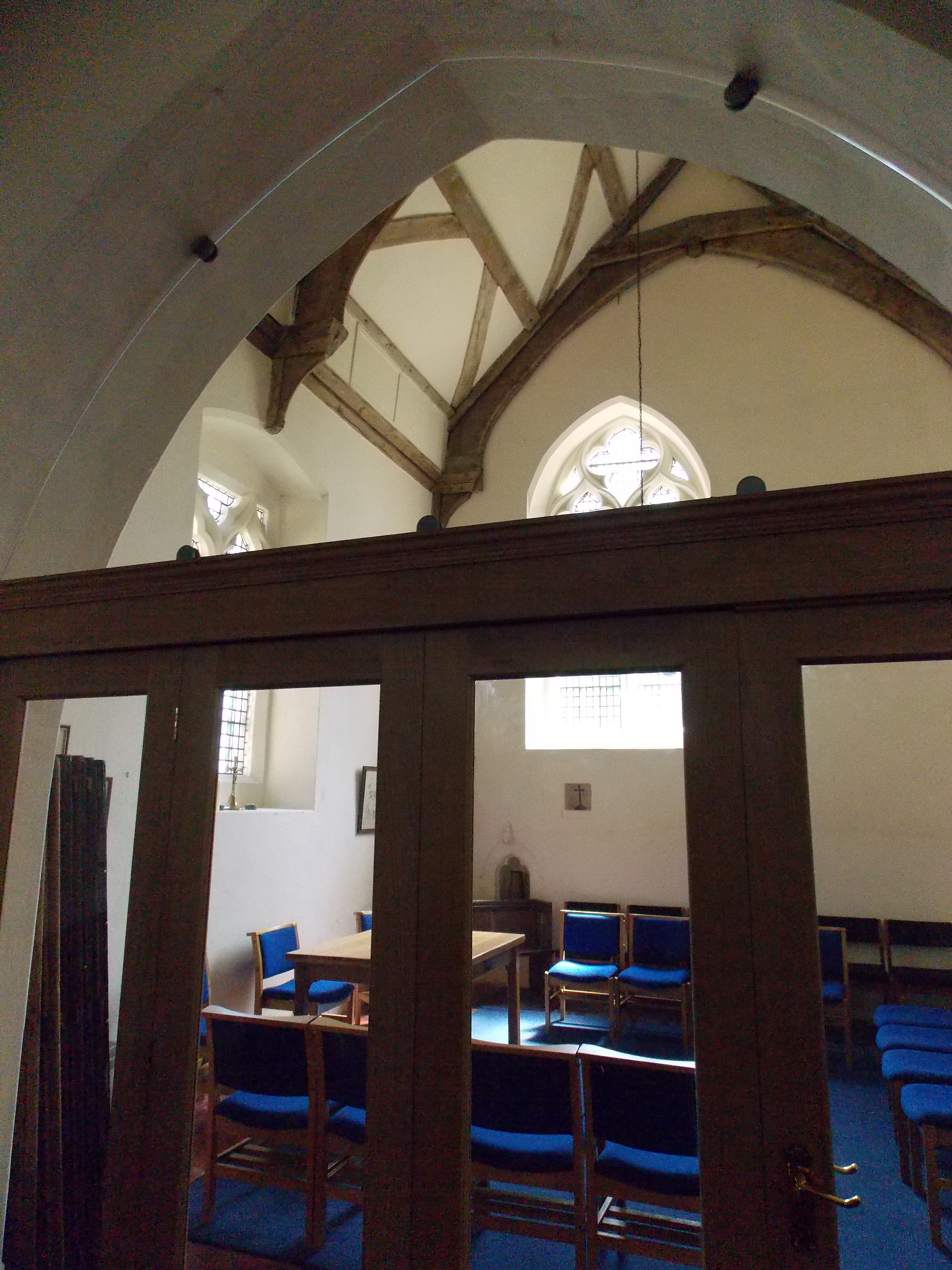
South transept with 15th-century truss roof

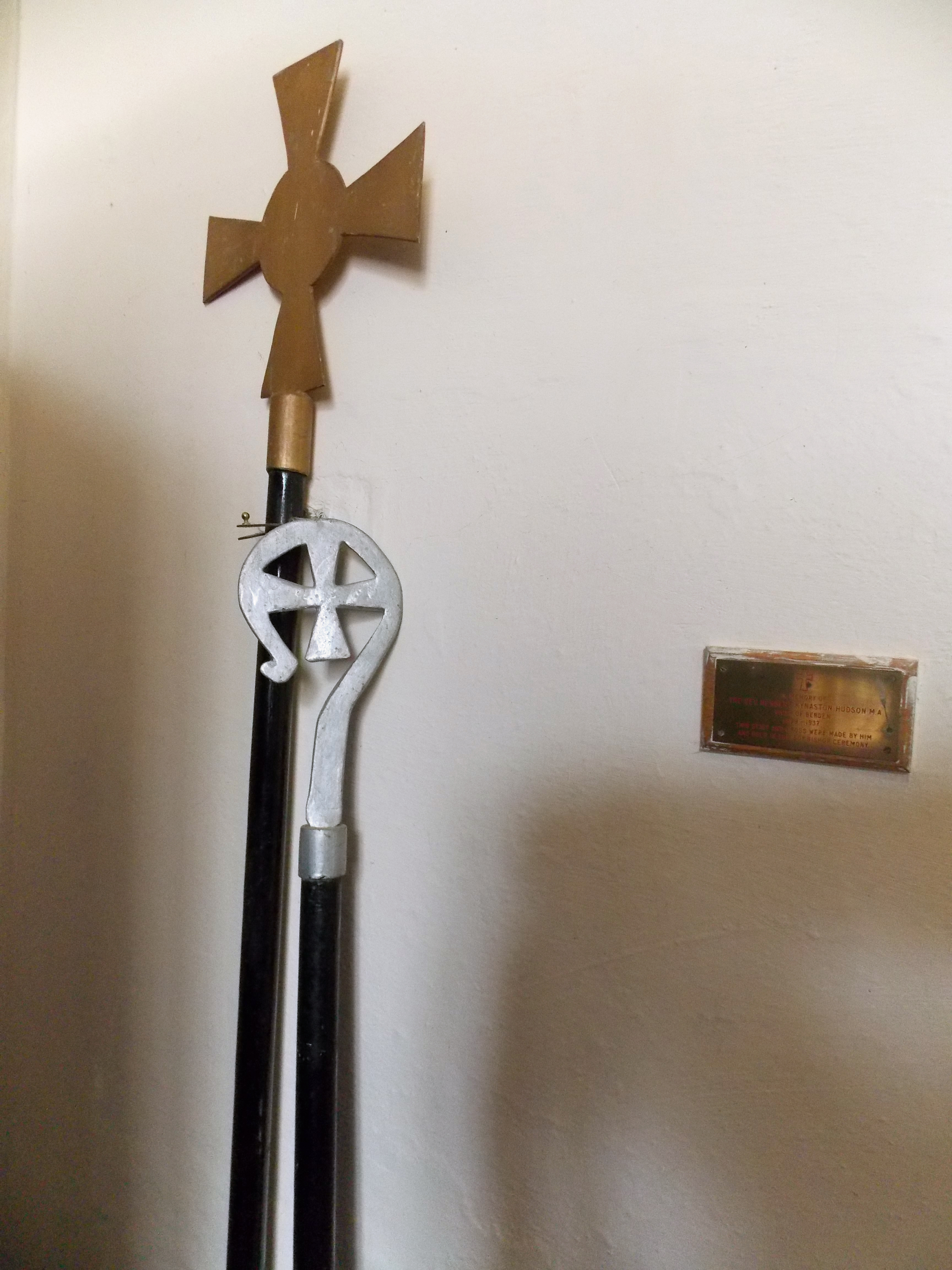
Boy Bishop cross and staff

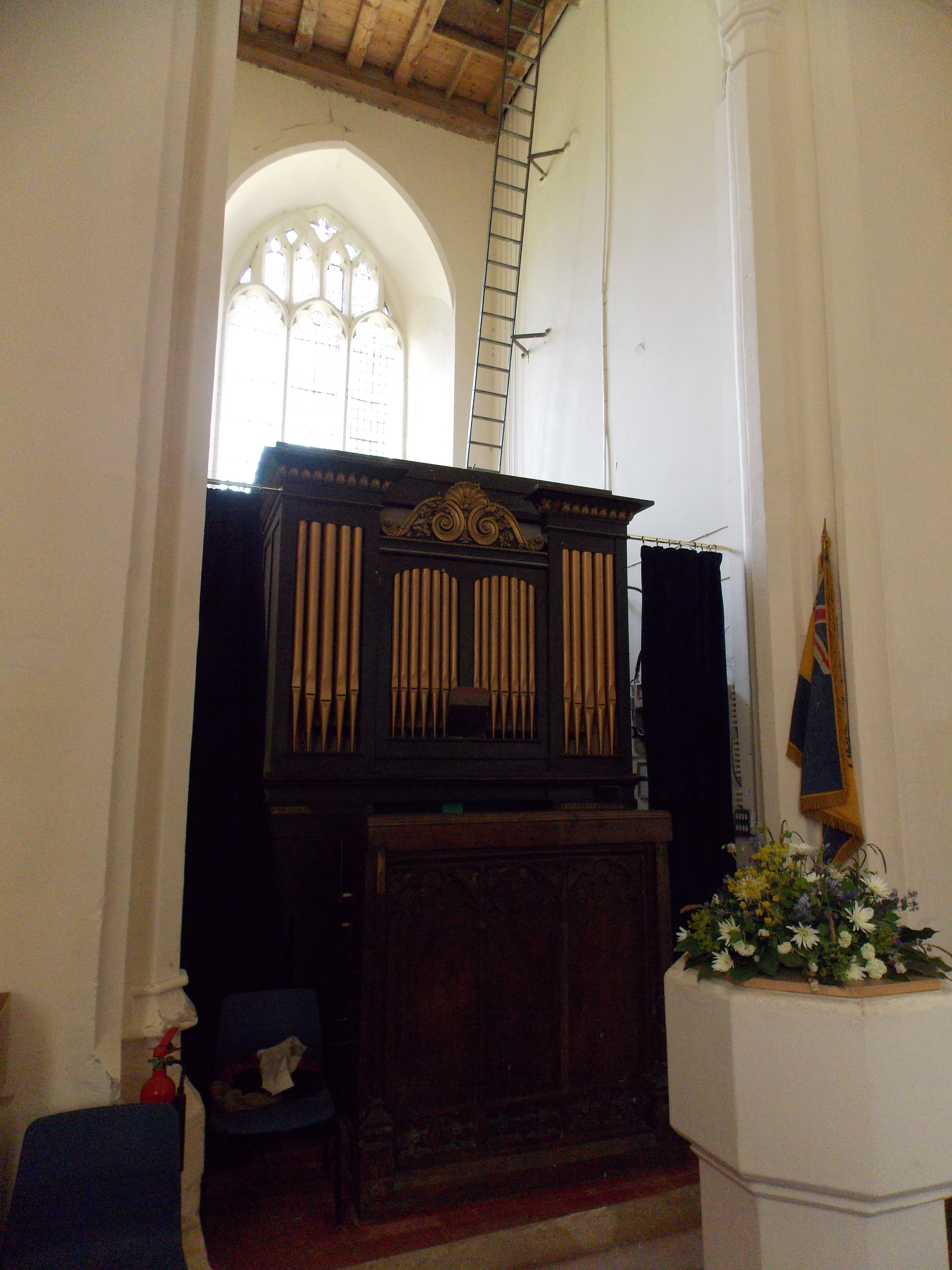
Church organ within tower arch

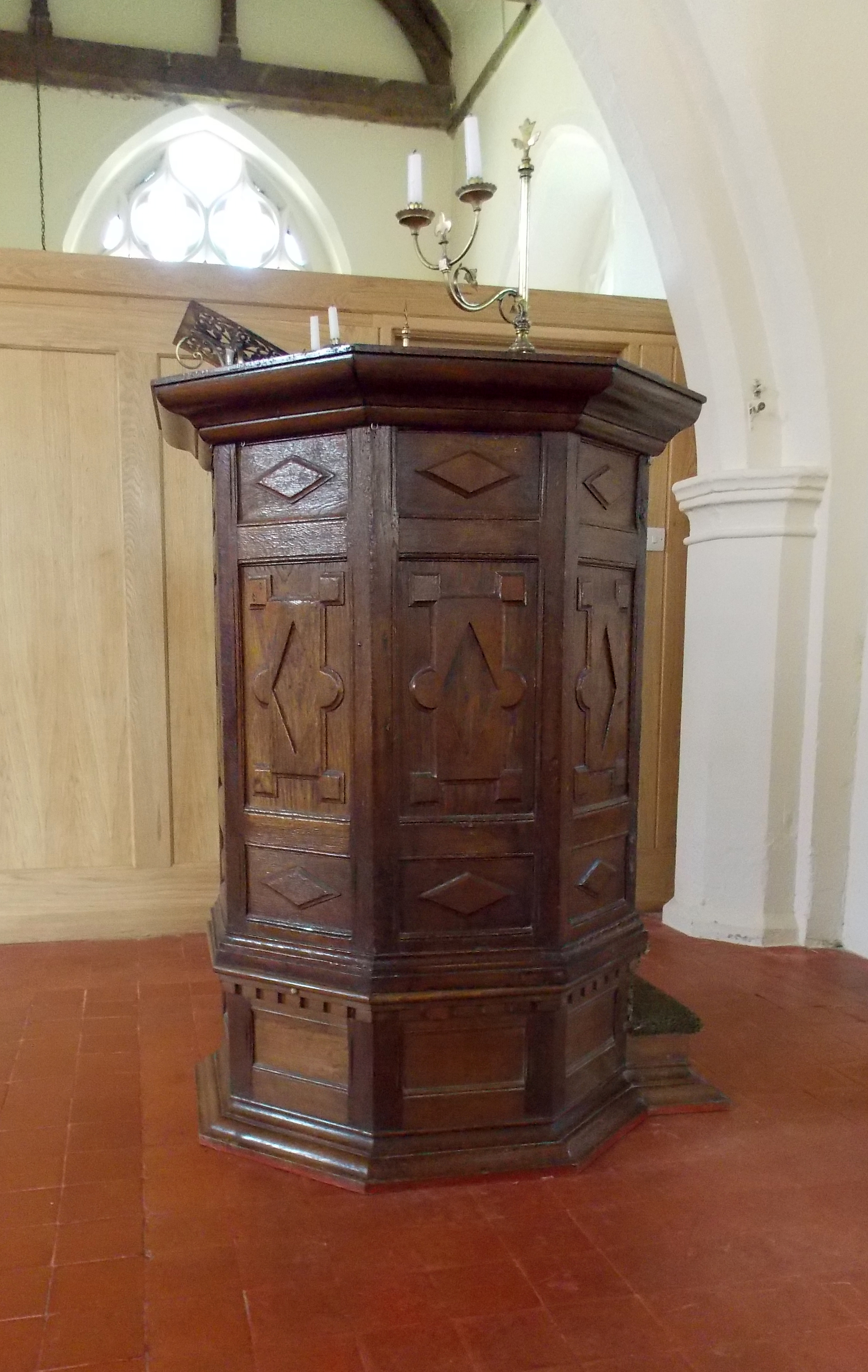
Pulpit

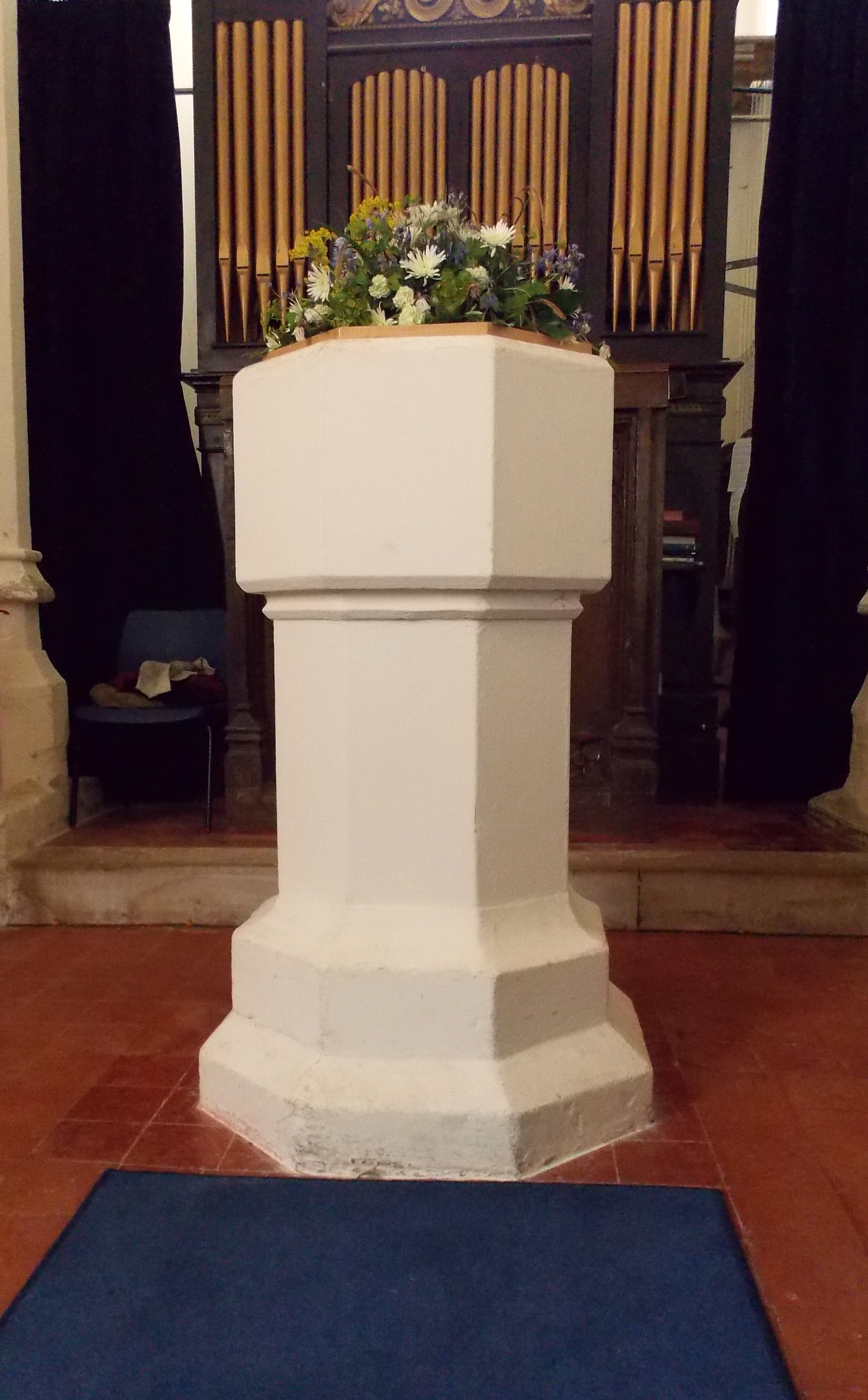
Font

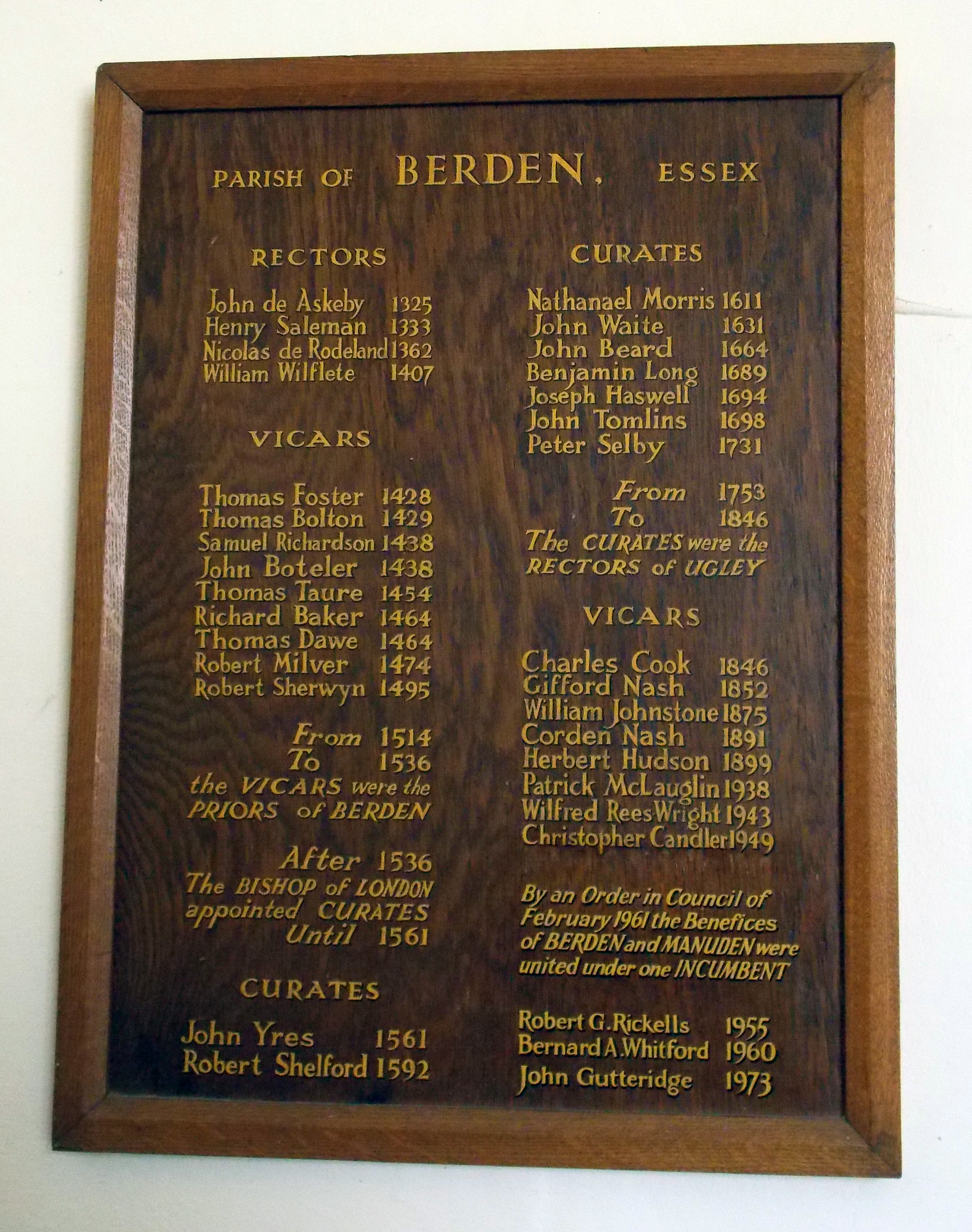
Priest listing board

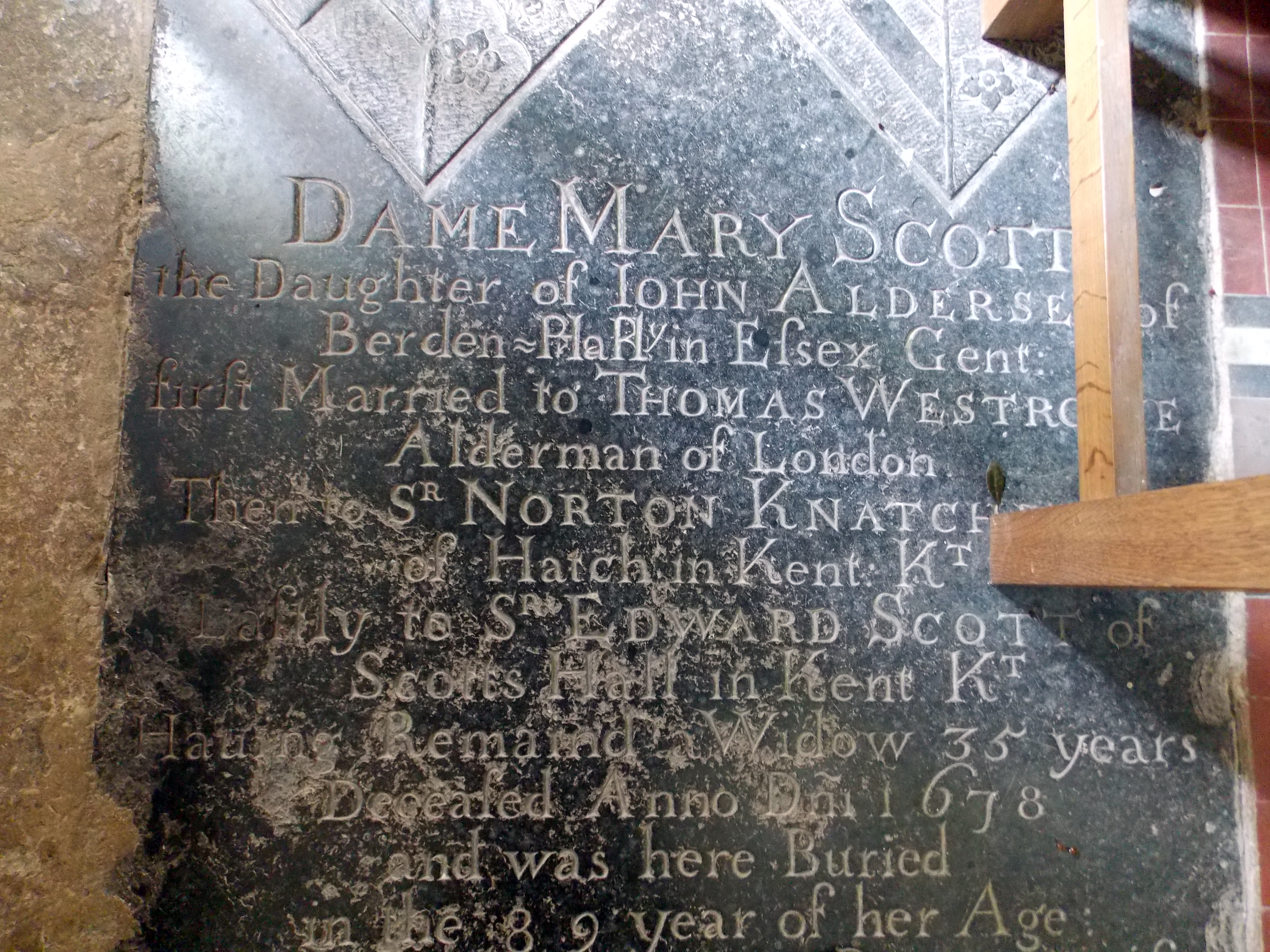
Slab to Dame Mary Scott

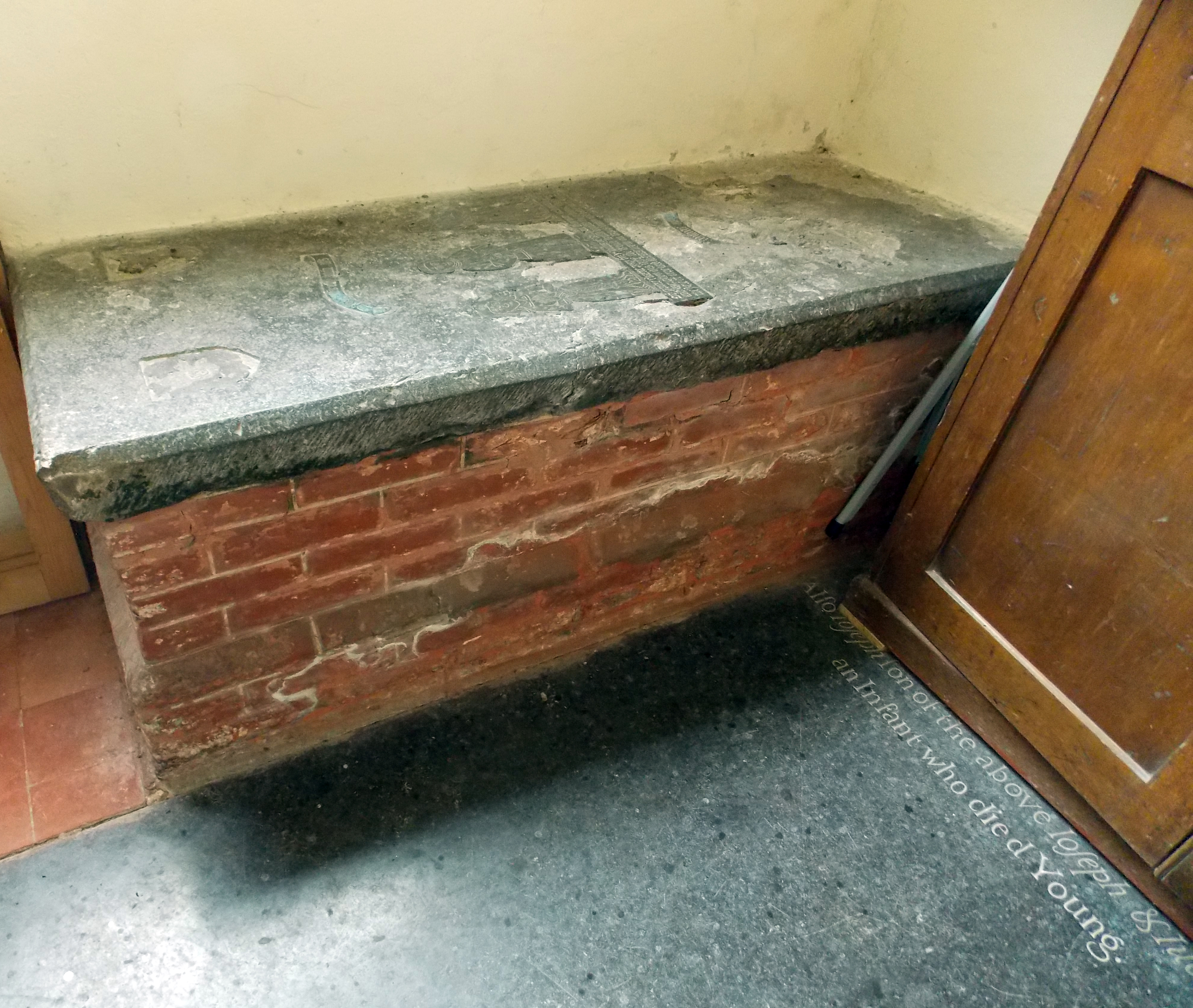
Table tomb to William Turnor in the north transept

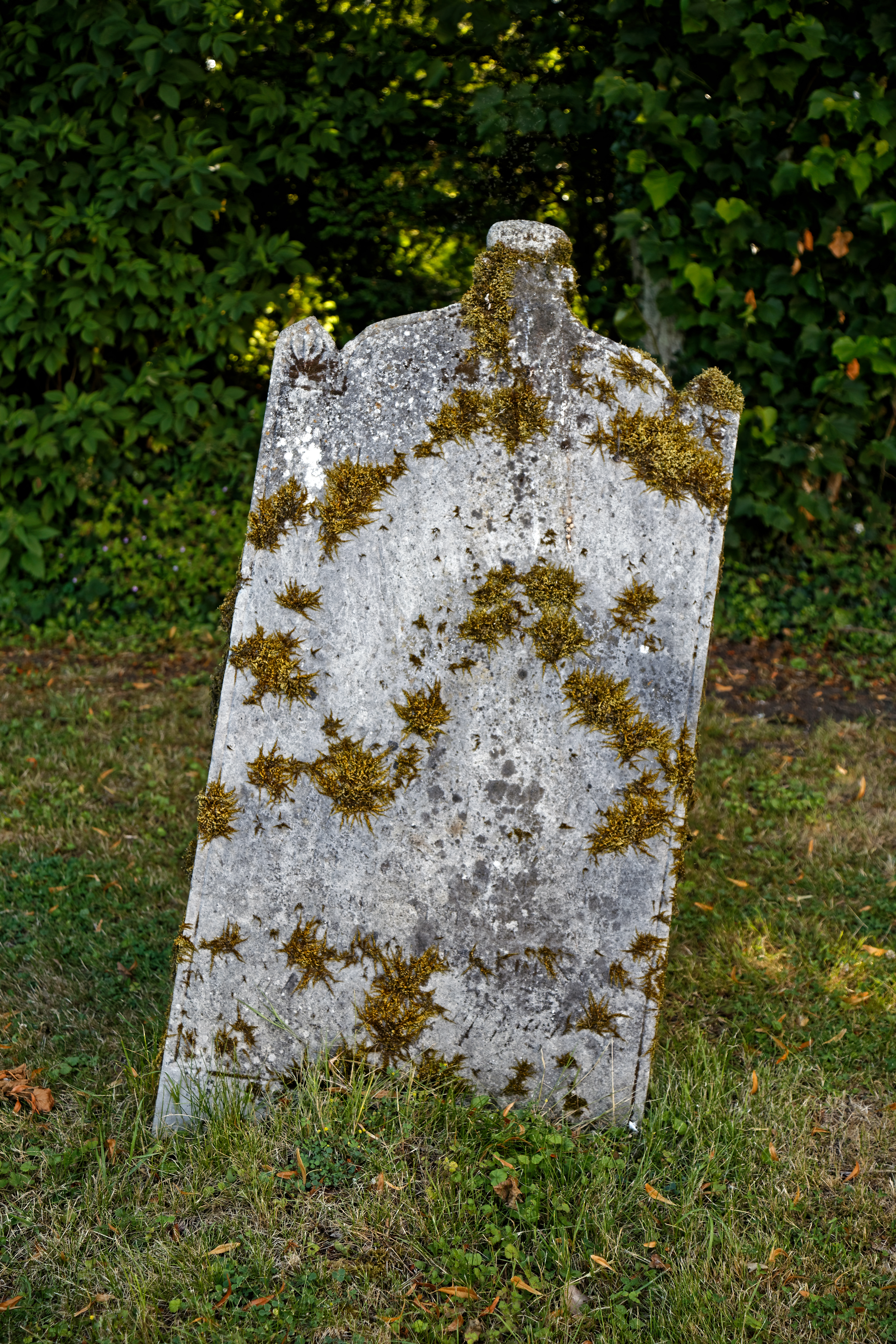
Henry Trigg headstone

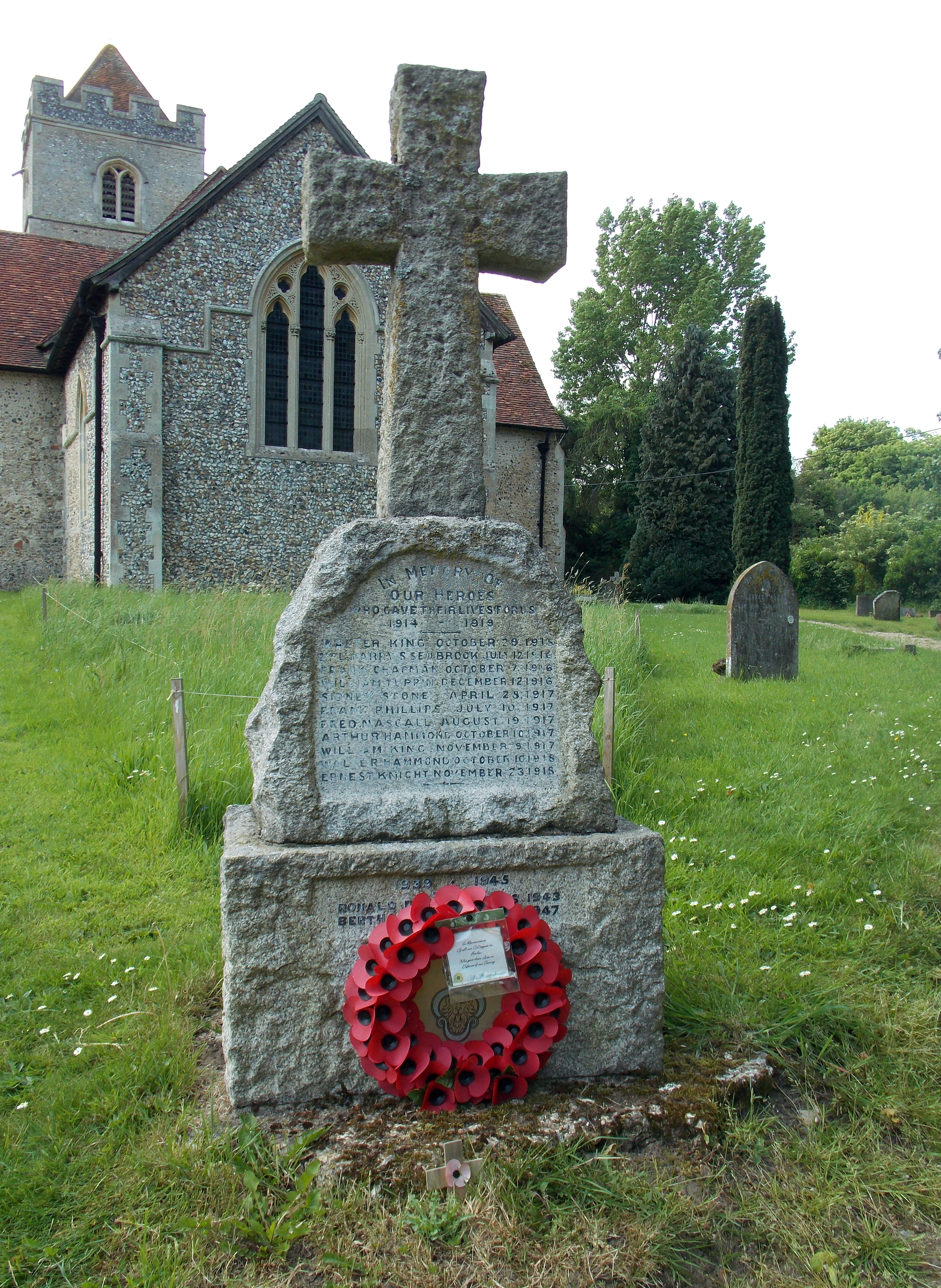
Churchyard war memorial
