= Burden =

Burden or burthen may refer to:

== People ==
- Burden (surname), people with the surname Burden

== Places ==
- Burden, Kansas, United States
- Burden, Luxembourg

== Arts, entertainment, and media ==
=== Films ===
- Burden (2018 film), an American drama film
- The Burden (film), a Swedish independent short film

=== Literature ===
- The Burden, by Agatha Christie, 1956
- The Burdens, a play by John Ruganda, 1972

=== Music ===
==== Songs ====
- "Burden", a song by As I Lay Dying from the album Through Storms Ahead
- "Burden", an interlude by Humanity's Last Breath from the album Ashen
- "Burden", a song by Opeth from the album Watershed
- "Burden", a song by Tesseract from War of Being
- "Burden", a song by Keith Urban
- "Burdens", a song by Ion Dissonance from the album Cast the First Stone
- "Burdens", a song by Kenny Wayne Shepherd from The Place You're In
- "Burdens", a song by The Yawpers
- "The Burden", a song by Bury Tomorrow from the album Earthbound
- "The Burden", a song by Crystal Lake from the album Dimension
- "The Burden", an interlude by Memphis May Fire from the album The Hollow
- "The Burden", a song by Strife from the album Witness a Rebirth
- "The Burden", a song by Trail of Tears from the album Disclosure in Red

==== Other uses in music ====
- A drone (sometimes spelt bourdon or burdon) produced by certain instruments
- Burden (or burthen), a refrain in English hymns and songs
- Burdens (album), a 2006 album by Ava Inferi

== Other uses ==
- Burden, an old accounting term for overhead costs
- Burden, in electrical engineering is the impedance presented to the secondary winding of a current transformer
- Burden (or burthen), an old term for ship's tonnage of cargo carrying capacity, from the archaic "burthen" or "byrthen"
- A legislative burden which regulatory reform aims to remove or reduce

== See also ==
- Burden of proof (disambiguation)
- Burdon (disambiguation)
- Onus (disambiguation)
