= Old Burdon =

Hamlet in County Durham, England

Coordinates: 54.84°N 01.40°W

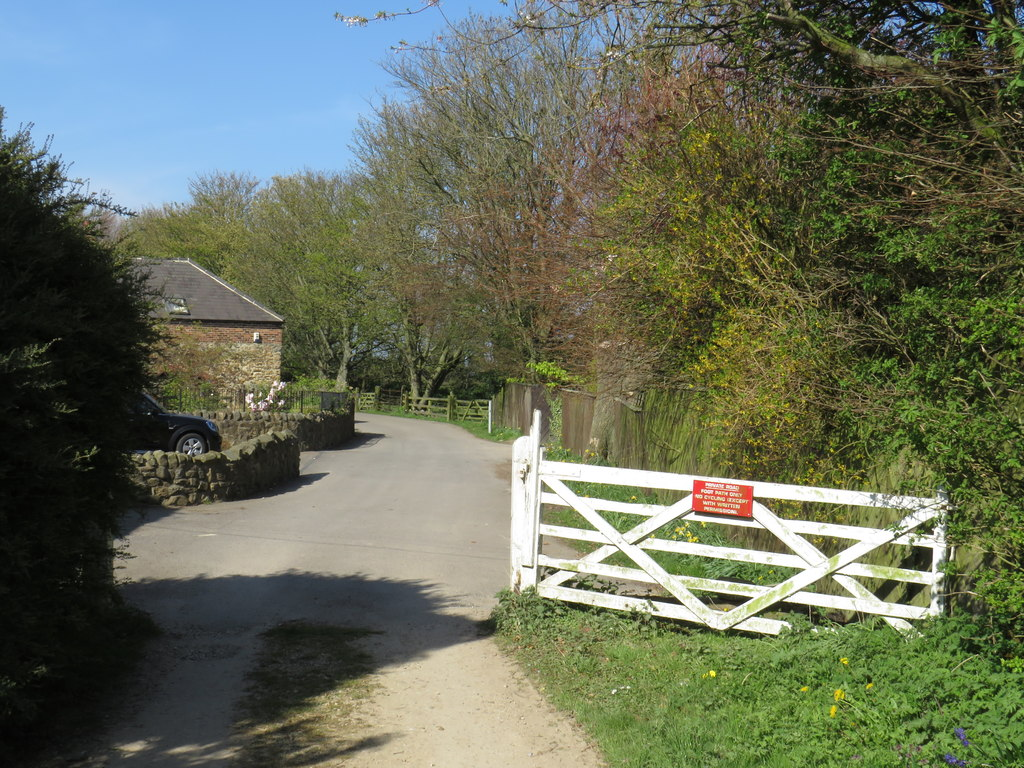

- Location within Tyne and Wear
- OS grid reference: NZ3850
- Civil parish: Burdon
- Metropolitan borough: Sunderland
- Metropolitan county: Tyne and Wear
- Region: North East
- Country: England
- Sovereign state: United Kingdom
- Police: Northumbria
- Fire: Tyne and Wear
- Ambulance: North East

Old Burdon is a hamlet in the civil parish of Burdon, in the Sunderland district, in the county of Tyne and Wear, England. Until 1974 it was in County Durham.
