= Onus =

Onus, from Latin, indicates accountability/responsibility

Onus may also refer to:

- Blame
- Burden (disambiguation)
- Legal burden of proof (onus probandi)

== As a surname ==
- Bill Onus (1906-68), Australian Aboriginal political activist, boomerang thrower
- Lin Onus (1948-96) Australian Aboriginal artist
