= Burdon Canal Nature Reserve =

Nature reserve in Belize

- IUCN category Ia (strict nature reserve)
- Location within Belize
- Location: Belize District, Belize
- Nearest city: Belize City
- Coordinates: 17.496°N 88.262°W
- Area: 5,255 acres (2,127 ha)
- Established: 1992

The Burdon Canal Nature Reserve in Belize is a low-lying basin, comprising the backswamps of the Belize River/Haulover Creek delta. It is permanently waterlogged, with a gradient of saline to fresh water arising from regular tidal inundation at the seaward fringe and freshwater flooding from inland. During the dry season, parts of the reserve may become hypersaline. The site's elevation is generally sea level, but rises to approximately 4 ft (1.2 m) along river banks. It receives approximately 75 inches (1,900 mm) to 80 inches (2,000 mm) of rain per year. The tide in the Canal is semi-diurnal, and the water level at the Canal Bridge lags about 2-3 hours behind the centre of Belize City.

== Wildlife ==
The site's bird life, Morelet's crocodiles, lepidoptera and odonata have been examined, along with adjacent waterways further down the Canal and along the Haulover Creek. Overall, about 50 birds were recorded. Meerman also includes incidental notes on plants and mammals encountered. Results from studies suggest that sites adjacent to the current reserve, namely the Haulover Creek and Burdon Canal between Jones and Northern Lagoon, contain higher biodiversity than the reserve itself. The land cover of the reserve and surrounding area has been mapped and is shown on large scale colour air photos held by the Forest Department. The reserve's vegetation is almost entirely Red Mangrove, with a belt of mixed freshwater swamp species such as Bullet Tree around Fabers Lagoon.
