= Burden of proof =

Burden of proof may refer to:

- Burden of proof (law)
- Burden of proof (philosophy)

== Books, film, and television ==
- The Burden of Proof (1918 film), a silent American film starring Marion Davies
- The Burden of Proof (Barlow novel), a 1968 novel by James Barlow
- The Burden of Proof (Turow novel), a 1990 novel by Scott Turow
- The Burden of Proof (miniseries), a 1992 TV series based on the Turow novel
- "Burden of Proof" (CSI episode)
- Burden of Proof, a CNN legal analysis show
- Burden of Proof (TV series), a 2023 American true crime documentary miniseries

== Music ==
- Burden of Proof (Soft Machine Legacy album), 2013
- Burden of Proof (Bob Schneider album), 2013
- Burden of Proof (Benny the Butcher album), 2020
