= Berden Hall =

- Location within Essex

General information
- Type: Private house, stately home
- Architectural style: Elizabethan
- Location: Berden, Uttlesford, Essex, England
- Coordinates: 51.9447°N 0.1336°E
- Completed: 1580s

Berden Hall is a Grade II* listed Elizabethan country house in Berden, in the Uttlesford District of Essex, England. The house was built in the 1580s. In 2012 the house was on the market for £3.5 million.

== History ==
A manor house existed in Berden in medieval times when the Rochford family were lords of the manor here and probably founded the nearby priory. In 1583 it passed to Sir Thomas Ramsey who gave the estate and priory to the mayor of London and governors of several hospitals.

The current red brick house is Elizabethan, built in the 1580s. The house is very similar to Toseland Hall in Huntingdonshire, built about 20 years later, with an identical outline, but different details. Further additions were made in the 17th century when it was owned by the Meade family, and the rainwater heads bear the date 1655. In the 1780s Thomas Hawkes owned Berden Hall, and in 1801 it still belonged to the Hawkes family.

Berden Hall became a Grade II* listed building on 26 November 1951. In June 2012 the house was on the market for £3.75 million with Bidwells.

== Architecture ==
Clive Aslet of The Daily Telegraph describes the "thick lime mortar joints that give a sparkle to Berden Hall’s facades", and the red bricks used on the house which are longer and thinner than those later used during the Georgian period. The house has three straight gables to each side and mullion-and-transom-cross windows, dated to the 17th century. There is a triple arch at the central doorway to the house, and inside is a winding 6 feet (1.8 m) wide Tudor staircase. The house has eight bedrooms, one of which is a master suite with two dressing rooms, a reception hall, drawing room, sitting room, dining room, kitchen, utility room, cloakroom, five bathrooms, two studies, a snooker room, a squash and tennis court and an indoor swimming pool, and outer staff buildings and stable block. The gardens contain a lake, footbridge and paddock in about 17 acres. There is a granary to the east of the house, about 120 yards (110 m) south of the village church.
