= Berden =

Village in Essex, England

Coordinates: 51.9475°N 0.1372°E

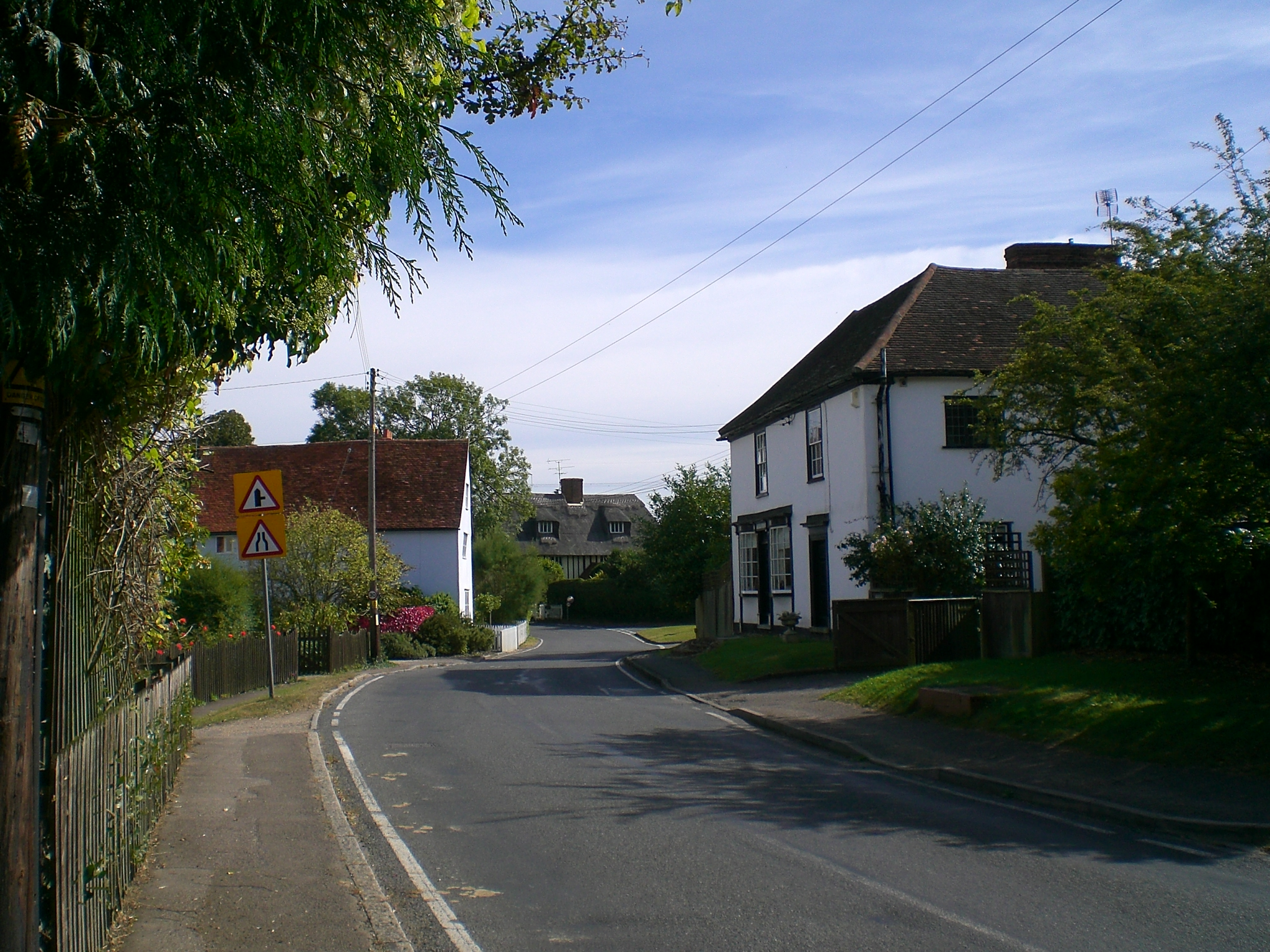

- Location within Essex
- Population: 473 (Parish, 2021)
- OS grid reference: TL469298
  - London: 30 mi (48 km) S
- Civil parish: Berden
- District: Uttlesford
- Shire county: Essex
- Region: East
- Country: England
- Sovereign state: United Kingdom
- Post town: BISHOP'S STORTFORD
- Postcode district: CM23
- Police: Essex
- Fire: Essex
- Ambulance: East of England
- UK Parliament: Saffron Walden

Berden is a village and civil parish in Essex, England. Berden village is approximately 6 miles (10 km) north from Bishop's Stortford, its post town (which is over the county boundary in Hertfordshire), and 21 miles (34 km) north-west of Essex's county town of Chelmsford. Berden parish, with its own parish council, is in the district of Uttlesford and in the parliamentary constituency of Saffron Walden.

At the 2021 census the parish had a population of 473.

Berden was part of Clavering hundred and is mentioned in the Domesday Book of 1086 as a location with four villagers and five smallholders.

== Notable sites ==
St Nicholas' Church, Berden is the parish church. Berden Hall dates to the 1580s. A manor and Berden Priory existed in Berden in medieval times.

== Notable people ==
- Joseph Mede, English scholar and theologian noted for writing the Clavis Apocalyptica.

== See also ==
- The Hundred Parishes
