= Burdon =

Village in Tyne and Wear, England

Coordinates: 54.855°N 1.397°W

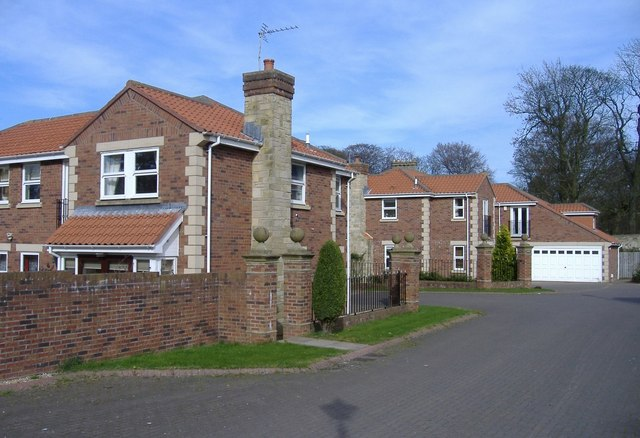
- Development (2007)

- Location within Tyne and Wear
- Population: 971
- OS grid reference: NZ387513
- Civil parish: Burdon
- Metropolitan borough: City of Sunderland
- Metropolitan county: Tyne and Wear
- Region: North East
- Country: England
- Sovereign state: United Kingdom
- Police: Northumbria
- Fire: Tyne and Wear
- Ambulance: North East

Burdon is a village and civil parish in the City of Sunderland in Tyne and Wear, England. It is south of the city centre. The north-west of the parish includes part of the Doxford Park estate. It has a population of 971. There is currently no parish council.

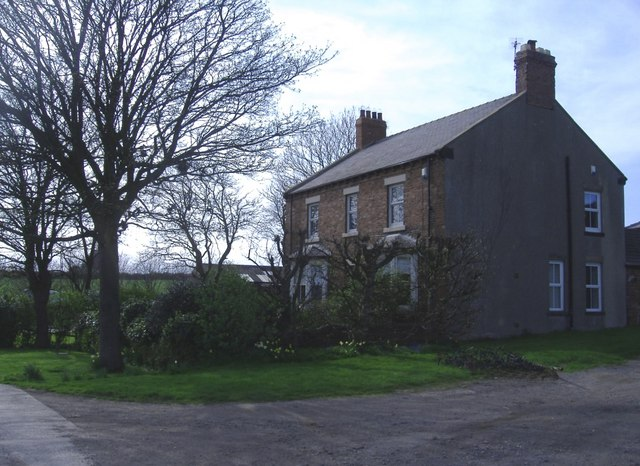
East Farm

== See also ==
- Great Burdon
- Burdon (music)
