= Berden Priory =

Priory in Berden, Essex, England

Coordinates: 51.946487°N 0.135183°E

Berden Priory was a priory in Essex, England. This site now has a Grade II* listed late 16th-century timber-framed house, the centre of Berden Priory Farm.
