= Listed buildings in Uttlesford =

There are about 3,700 Listed Buildings in Uttlesford district, Essex, which are buildings of architectural or historic interest.

- Grade I buildings are of exceptional interest.
- Grade II* buildings are particularly important buildings of more than special interest.
- Grade II buildings are of special interest.

The lists follow Historic England’s geographical organisation, with entries grouped by county, local authority, and parish (civil and non-civil). The following lists are arranged by parish.

Parish	Listed buildings list	Grade I	Grade II*	Grade II	Total
Arkesden	Listed buildings in Arkesden				38
Ashdon	Listed buildings in Ashdon				66
Aythorpe Roding	Listed buildings in Aythorpe Roding				36
Barnston	Listed buildings in Barnston, Essex				40
Berden	Listed buildings in Berden				21
Birchanger	Listed buildings in Birchanger				14
Broxted	Listed buildings in Broxted				46
Chickney	Listed buildings in Chickney				10
Chrishall	Listed buildings in Chrishall				47
Clavering	Listed buildings in Clavering				84
Debden	Listed buildings in Debden, Essex				65
Elmdon	Listed buildings in Elmdon				53
Elsenham	Listed buildings in Elsenham				53
Farnham	Listed buildings in Farnham, Essex				50
Felsted	Listed buildings in Felsted				192
Great Bardfield	no listed buildings				
Great Canfield	Listed buildings in Great Canfield				67
Great Chesterford	Listed buildings in Great Chesterford				69
Great Dunmow	Listed buildings in Great Dunmow				249
Great Easton	Listed buildings in Great Easton				66
Great Hallingbury	Listed buildings in Great Hallingbury				68
Great Sampford	Listed buildings in Great Sampford				54
Great Waltham	Listed buildings in Great Waltham				2
Hadstock	Listed buildings in Hadstock				38
Hatfield Broad Oak	Listed buildings in Hatfield Broad Oak				95
Hatfield Heath	Listed buildings in Hatfield Heath				44
Helions Bumpstead	no listed buildings				
Hempstead	Listed buildings in Hempstead, Essex				39
Henham	Listed buildings in Henham				68
High Easter	Listed buildings in High Easter				70
High Roding	Listed buildings in High Roothing				53
Langley	Listed buildings in Langley, Essex				37
Leaden Roding	Listed buildings in Leaden Roding				15
Lindsell	Listed buildings in Lindsell				29
Little Bardfield	Listed buildings in Little Bardfield				28
Little Canfield	Listed buildings in Little Canfield				33
Little Chesterford	Listed buildings in Little Chesterford				14
Little Dunmow	Listed buildings in Little Dunmow				45
Little Easton	Listed buildings in Little Easton				35
Little Hallingbury	Listed buildings in Little Hallingbury				61
Little Sampford	Listed buildings in Little Sampford				46
Littlebury	Listed buildings in Littlebury	3	1	64	68
Manuden	Listed buildings in Manuden				72
Margaret Roding	Listed buildings in Margaret Roding				10
Matching	no listed buildings				
Newport	Listed buildings in Newport, Essex				82
Quendon	Listed buildings in Quendon				51
Radwinter	Listed buildings in Radwinter				54
Saffron Walden	Listed buildings in Saffron Walden	10	32	331	373
Sewards End	Listed buildings in Sewards End				23
Stansted Mountfitchet	Listed buildings in Stansted Mountfitchet				135
Stebbing	Listed buildings in Stebbing				152
Strethall	Listed buildings in Strethall				7
Takeley	Listed buildings in Takeley				74
Thaxted	Listed buildings in Thaxted				214
Tilty	Listed buildings in Tilty				18
Ugley	Listed buildings in Ugley				39
Wenden Lofts	Listed buildings in Wenden Lofts		1	10	11
Wendens Ambo	Listed buildings in Wendens Ambo	1		29	30
Wethersfield	no listed buildings				
White Roding	Listed buildings in White Roding				48
Wicken Bonhunt	Listed buildings in Wicken Bonhunt				18
Widdington	Listed buildings in Widdington				47
Wimbish	Listed buildings in Wimbish				56

== Sources ==
- Bettley, James; Pevsner, Nikolaus (2007) [1954], Essex, The Buildings of England, New Haven and London: Yale University Press, ISBN 978-0-300-11614-4
