= Listed buildings in Saffron Walden =

Saffron Walden is a town and civil parish within the Uttlesford District in Essex, England. It contains ten grade I, 32 grade II* and 331 grade II listed buildings that are recorded in the National Heritage List for England.

This list is based on the information retrieved online from Historic England.

== Key ==
| Grade | Criteria |
|---|---|
| I | Buildings that are of exceptional interest |
| II* | Particularly important buildings of more than special interest |
| II | Buildings that are of special interest |

== Listing ==
| Name | Grade | Location | Type | Completed (Note: The date given is the date used by Historic England as significant for the initial building or that of an important part in the structure's description.) | Date designated | Grid ref. (Note: The grid reference is based on the British national grid reference system, sometimes known as OSGB36, used by the Ordnance Survey.) Geo-coordinates | Notes | Entry number (Note: The "List Entry Number" is a unique number assigned to each listed building and scheduled monument by Historic England.) | Image | Wikidata |
|---|---|---|---|---|---|---|---|---|---|---|
| Polish SOE War Memorial | II | Audley End | | | 19 February 2018 | TL5240138083; 52°01′13″N 0°13′11″E | | 1451516 | Polish SOE War Memorial More images | Q55238428 |
| 2 and 3, Abbey Lane | II | 2 and 3, Abbey Lane | | | 1 November 1972 | TL5366338366; 52°01′21″N 0°14′17″E | | 1204309 | Upload Photo | Q26499769 |
| 4-8, Abbey Lane | II | 4-8, Abbey Lane | | | 1 November 1972 | TL5364438362; 52°01′21″N 0°14′16″E | | 1204321 | Upload Photo | Q26499779 |
| United Reformed Church | II | Abbey Lane | | | 1 November 1972 | TL5359838349; 52°01′20″N 0°14′14″E | | 1281265 | United Reformed Church More images | Q26570327 |
| Walden Lodge | II | Abbey Lane | | | 1 November 1972 | TL5340138270; 52°01′18″N 0°14′03″E | | 1196109 | Upload Photo | Q26490661 |
| Wall Along South Side of Abbey Lane | II | Abbey Lane | | | 31 October 1994 | TL5349638300; 52°01′19″N 0°14′08″E | | 1204337 | Upload Photo | Q26499795 |
| Bridge Over the River Cam | I | at TL 521 380, South West of Audley End House | | | 28 November 1951 | TL5218338022; 52°01′11″N 0°12′59″E | | 1196115 | Bridge Over the River Cam More images | Q17539585 |
| Gateway at Icehouse Lodge | II | Audley End Road | | | 5 September 1972 | TL5301837920; 52°01′07″N 0°13′43″E | | 1204355 | Upload Photo | Q26499812 |
| Home Farm House | II | Audley End Road | | | 28 November 1951 | TL5243438000; 52°01′10″N 0°13′12″E | | 1204349 | Upload Photo | Q26499806 |
| Icehouse Lodge | II | Audley End Road | | | 5 September 1972 | TL5303537920; 52°01′07″N 0°13′44″E | | 1196112 | Upload Photo | Q26490663 |
| Lion Gate | II* | Audley End Road | | | 1 November 1972 | TL5233238023; 52°01′11″N 0°13′07″E | | 1204373 | Lion Gate More images | Q17534176 |
| Lion House | II | Audley End Road | | | 28 November 1951 | TL5237337995; 52°01′10″N 0°13′09″E | | 1196113 | Upload Photo | Q26490664 |
| Lion Lodge | II | Audley End Road | | | 1 November 1972 | TL5235038032; 52°01′11″N 0°13′08″E | | 1204361 | Lion Lodge More images | Q26499818 |
| Railings on South Side of Park | II | Audley End Road | | | 31 October 1994 | TL5228638022; 52°01′11″N 0°13′04″E | | 1297798 | Upload Photo | Q26585348 |
| South Boundary Wall to Park | II* | Audley End Road | | | 28 November 1951 | TL5299237926; 52°01′07″N 0°13′41″E | | 1204384 | South Boundary Wall to Park More images | Q17534190 |
| K6 Telephone Kiosk Telephone Kiosk Outside Number 1 | II | Audley End Village | | | 16 February 1988 | TL5248037966; 52°01′09″N 0°13′15″E | | 1297743 | Upload Photo | Q26585297 |
| Commemorative Column | II* | at TL 526 389, North East of Audley End House, Audley Park | | | 28 November 1951 | TL5267138944; 52°01′40″N 0°13′26″E | | 1196117 | Upload Photo | Q17534026 |
| Audley End House | I | Audley Park | | | 1 November 1972 | TL5246738150; 52°01′15″N 0°13′14″E | | 1196114 | Audley End House More images | Q758949 |
| Steps 80 Metres East of Audley End House | II | Audley Park | | | 1 November 1972 | TL5258038150; 52°01′15″N 0°13′20″E | | 1297799 | Upload Photo | Q26585349 |
| Temple of Concord | II* | Audley Park | | | 1 November 1972 | TL5284638133; 52°01′14″N 0°13′34″E | | 1196116 | Temple of Concord More images | Q17534015 |
| Urn on Pedestal 50 Metres South of Audley End House | II | Audley Park | | | 1 November 1972 | TL5246738065; 52°01′12″N 0°13′14″E | | 1281218 | Urn on Pedestal 50 Metres South of Audley End House More images | Q26570283 |
| Falcon Grove | II | 34, Audley Road | | | 31 October 1994 | TL5405538217; 52°01′16″N 0°14′38″E | | 1196118 | Upload Photo | Q26490665 |
| Gloriana and front wall and railings | II | 36, Audley Road | | | 1 November 1972 | TL5401738202; 52°01′15″N 0°14′36″E | | 1297802 | Upload Photo | Q26585351 |
| Audley Cottage | II | 51, Audley Road | | | 1 November 1972 | TL5390538198; 52°01′15″N 0°14′30″E | | 1196120 | Upload Photo | Q26490667 |
| 55, Audley Road | II | 55, Audley Road | | | 1 November 1972 | TL5385938178; 52°01′14″N 0°14′27″E | | 1297803 | Upload Photo | Q26585352 |
| Abbey House | II | Audley Road | | | 28 November 1951 | TL5240537995; 52°01′10″N 0°13′11″E | | 1196111 | Upload Photo | Q26490662 |
| Baptist Church Hall | II | Audley Road | | | 1 November 1972 | TL5384438176; 52°01′14″N 0°14′26″E | | 1204441 | Baptist Church Hall More images | Q26499884 |
| Number 49 Gates to Former Elm Grove | II | Audley Road | | | 1 November 1972 | TL5392338193; 52°01′15″N 0°14′31″E | | 1196119 | Upload Photo | Q26490666 |
| 1 and 3, Borough Lane | II | 1 and 3, Borough Lane | | | 31 October 1994 | TL5365637875; 52°01′05″N 0°14′16″E | | 1196121 | Upload Photo | Q26490668 |
| Gates and Steps at North Corner of Gardens | II | Bridge End Gardens | | | 1 November 1972 | TL5357838880; 52°01′37″N 0°14′14″E | | 1204443 | Upload Photo | Q26499886 |
| Gates on West Side at Approach From Bridge Street | II | Bridge End Gardens | | | 1 November 1972 | TL5357938750; 52°01′33″N 0°14′13″E | | 1297804 | Upload Photo | Q26585353 |
| Kitchen Garden Walls | II | Bridge End Gardens | | | 31 October 1994 | TL5353038871; 52°01′37″N 0°14′11″E | | 1281202 | Upload Photo | Q26570270 |
| Pavilion 10 Metres North West of Gates Approaching From Bridge Street | II | Bridge End Gardens | | | 1 November 1972 | TL5357238762; 52°01′34″N 0°14′13″E | | 1204465 | Upload Photo | Q26499907 |
| Summerhouse at North West Corner of Gardens | II | Bridge End Gardens | | | 1 November 1972 | TL5356438814; 52°01′35″N 0°14′13″E | | 1196122 | Upload Photo | Q26490669 |
| Wall Running North East From the Centre of the South West Side of the Gardens | II | Bridge End Gardens | | | 1 November 1972 | TL5357638784; 52°01′34″N 0°14′13″E | | 1204472 | Upload Photo | Q26499913 |
| 2 and 2A, Bridge Street | II | 2 and 2A, Bridge Street | | | 31 October 1994 | TL5358738621; 52°01′29″N 0°14′14″E | | 1281158 | 2 and 2A, Bridge Street More images | Q26570229 |
| 4, Bridge Street | II | 4, Bridge Street | | | 31 October 1994 | TL5358438630; 52°01′29″N 0°14′14″E | | 1196123 | 4, Bridge Street More images | Q26490670 |
| 5 and 7, Bridge Street | II* | 5 and 7, Bridge Street | | | 28 November 1951 | TL5356438630; 52°01′29″N 0°14′12″E | | 1204528 | 5 and 7, Bridge Street More images | Q17534202 |
| 8, Bridge Street | II | 8, Bridge Street | | | 28 November 1951 | TL5357838642; 52°01′30″N 0°14′13″E | | 1196124 | 8, Bridge Street More images | Q26490671 |
| 9 and 11, Bridge Street | II | 9 and 11, Bridge Street | | | 28 November 1951 | TL5355938637; 52°01′30″N 0°14′12″E | | 1204538 | 9 and 11, Bridge Street More images | Q26499975 |
| 12, Bridge Street | II | 12, Bridge Street | | | 28 November 1951 | TL5356838655; 52°01′30″N 0°14′13″E | | 1297806 | 12, Bridge Street More images | Q26585354 |
| Bridge House the Corner House | II* | 15, Bridge Street | | | 28 November 1951 | TL5354538653; 52°01′30″N 0°14′11″E | | 1204544 | Bridge House the Corner House More images | Q17534214 |
| Eight Bells Inn | II* | 18, Bridge Street | | | 28 November 1951 | TL5355538680; 52°01′31″N 0°14′12″E | | 1196128 | Eight Bells Inn More images | Q17534049 |
| 19 and 21, Bridge Street | II | 19 and 21, Bridge Street | | | 28 November 1951 | TL5353638669; 52°01′31″N 0°14′11″E | | 1196125 | 19 and 21, Bridge Street More images | Q26490672 |
| 23 and 25, Bridge Street | II | 23 and 25, Bridge Street | | | 28 November 1951 | TL5352738680; 52°01′31″N 0°14′11″E | | 1204562 | 23 and 25, Bridge Street More images | Q26499994 |
| 24 and 26, Bridge Street | II* | 24 and 26, Bridge Street | | | 28 November 1951 | TL5351338719; 52°01′32″N 0°14′10″E | | 1204567 | 24 and 26, Bridge Street More images | Q17534227 |
| 27 and 29, Bridge Street | II* | 27 and 29, Bridge Street | | | 28 November 1951 | TL5352038679; 52°01′31″N 0°14′10″E | | 1297807 | 27 and 29, Bridge Street More images | Q17534684 |
| 28, Bridge Street | II | 28, Bridge Street | | | 28 November 1951 | TL5350838725; 52°01′33″N 0°14′10″E | | 1204575 | 28, Bridge Street More images | Q26500006 |
| 31, Bridge Street | II* | 31, Bridge Street | | | 28 November 1951 | TL5351938688; 52°01′31″N 0°14′10″E | | 1196126 | 31, Bridge Street More images | Q17534037 |
| 32, Bridge Street | II | 32, Bridge Street | | | 28 November 1951 | TL5350138730; 52°01′33″N 0°14′09″E | | 1204585 | 32, Bridge Street More images | Q26500015 |
| 33, Bridge Street | II* | 33, Bridge Street | | | 28 November 1951 | TL5351438683; 52°01′31″N 0°14′10″E | | 1297768 | Upload Photo | Q17534663 |
| Barn 1 Metre North East of Bridge End Road Farmhouse | II | Bridge Street | | | 31 October 1994 | TL5354138722; 52°01′32″N 0°14′11″E | | 1196127 | Barn 1 Metre North East of Bridge End Road Farmhouse More images | Q26490673 |
| Barn Approximately 30 Metres North of Bridge End Farmhouse | II | Bridge Street | | | 1 November 1972 | TL5352038759; 52°01′34″N 0°14′10″E | | 1281117 | Upload Photo | Q26570191 |
| Bridge End Farmhouse | II | Bridge Street | | | 1 November 1972 | TL5353438710; 52°01′32″N 0°14′11″E | | 1281152 | Bridge End Farmhouse More images | Q26570224 |
| Swan Lodge | II | Bridge Street | | | 1 November 1972 | TL5344938741; 52°01′33″N 0°14′07″E | | 1204601 | Upload Photo | Q26500029 |
| Wall to Swan Lodge and Extending Along Street Frontage | II | Bridge Street | | | 1 November 1972 | TL5346538736; 52°01′33″N 0°14′07″E | | 1281123 | Upload Photo | Q26570195 |
| Butlers Farmhouse | II | Butlers Lane | | | 28 November 1951 | TL5605240692; 52°02′34″N 0°16′26″E | | 1196129 | Upload Photo | Q26490674 |
| Oakfield Cottage at Butlers Farm | II | Butlers Lane | | | 1 November 1972 | TL5634040209; 52°02′18″N 0°16′41″E | | 1204644 | Upload Photo | Q26500066 |
| Painter's Farmhouse | II | Butlers Lane | | | 1 November 1972 | TL5636340031; 52°02′12″N 0°16′41″E | | 1196130 | Upload Photo | Q26490675 |
| Castle Hill House | II | Castle Hill | | | 28 November 1951 | TL5402838748; 52°01′33″N 0°14′37″E | | 1204653 | Castle Hill House More images | Q26500074 |
| 1 and 3, Castle Street | II | 1 and 3, Castle Street | | | 1 November 1972 | TL5360138626; 52°01′29″N 0°14′14″E | | 1196131 | 1 and 3, Castle Street More images | Q26490676 |
| Trinity House | II | 2, Castle Street | | | 1 November 1972 | TL5366838641; 52°01′30″N 0°14′18″E | | 1281109 | Upload Photo | Q26570184 |
| 4, Castle Street | II | 4, Castle Street | | | 28 November 1951 | TL5368138652; 52°01′30″N 0°14′19″E | | 1196132 | Upload Photo | Q26490677 |
| Stable Cottage | II | 4A, Castle Street | | | 31 October 1994 | TL5369838633; 52°01′29″N 0°14′19″E | | 1281113 | Upload Photo | Q26570187 |
| 5 and 7, Castle Street | II | 5 and 7, Castle Street | | | 28 November 1951 | TL5360638632; 52°01′29″N 0°14′15″E | | 1196133 | 5 and 7, Castle Street More images | Q26490678 |
| 8, Castle Street | II | 8, Castle Street | | | 1 November 1972 | TL5369238659; 52°01′30″N 0°14′19″E | | 1204672 | Upload Photo | Q26500093 |
| 9, Castle Street | II | 9, Castle Street | | | 28 November 1951 | TL5361838639; 52°01′30″N 0°14′15″E | | 1196134 | 9, Castle Street More images | Q26490679 |
| 10, 12 and 14, Castle Street | II | 10, 12 and 14, Castle Street | | | 1 November 1972 | TL5369838664; 52°01′30″N 0°14′20″E | | 1281079 | 10, 12 and 14, Castle Street More images | Q26570156 |
| 11, Castle Street | II | 11, Castle Street | | | 28 November 1951 | TL5362338641; 52°01′30″N 0°14′16″E | | 1297769 | 11, Castle Street More images | Q26585321 |
| 13, Castle Street | II | 13, Castle Street | | | 28 November 1951 | TL5363038644; 52°01′30″N 0°14′16″E | | 1205283 | 13, Castle Street More images | Q26500641 |
| 15, Castle Street | II | 15, Castle Street | | | 28 November 1951 | TL5363438648; 52°01′30″N 0°14′16″E | | 1196135 | 15, Castle Street More images | Q26490680 |
| 16, Castle Street | II | 16, Castle Street | | | 1 November 1972 | TL5370738667; 52°01′30″N 0°14′20″E | | 1205315 | Upload Photo | Q26500668 |
| 17 and 19, Castle Street | II | 17 and 19, Castle Street | | | 28 November 1951 | TL5364038650; 52°01′30″N 0°14′16″E | | 1205320 | 17 and 19, Castle Street More images | Q26500673 |
| The Old Rectory Surgery | II | 18, Castle Street | | | 30 April 1985 | TL5373138674; 52°01′31″N 0°14′21″E | | 1297770 | Upload Photo | Q26585322 |
| 20, 22 and 24, Castle Street | II | 20, 22 and 24, Castle Street | | | 28 November 1951 | TL5378438707; 52°01′32″N 0°14′24″E | | 1196136 | 20, 22 and 24, Castle Street More images | Q26490681 |
| 26 and 28, Castle Street | II | 26 and 28, Castle Street | | | 28 November 1951 | TL5379738725; 52°01′32″N 0°14′25″E | | 1196137 | 26 and 28, Castle Street More images | Q26490682 |
| St Vincets | II | 27, Castle Street | | | 28 November 1951 | TL5365338662; 52°01′30″N 0°14′17″E | | 1297771 | St Vincets More images | Q26585323 |
| 29, 31 and 33, Castle Street | II | 29, 31 and 33, Castle Street | | | 28 November 1951 | TL5366438667; 52°01′31″N 0°14′18″E | | 1196138 | 29, 31 and 33, Castle Street More images | Q26490683 |
| 30, 32 and 34, Castle Street | II | 30, 32 and 34, Castle Street | | | 1 November 1972 | TL5380338730; 52°01′32″N 0°14′25″E | | 1297772 | 30, 32 and 34, Castle Street More images | Q26585324 |
| Walsingham House | II | 35, Castle Street | | | 28 November 1951 | TL5367438678; 52°01′31″N 0°14′18″E | | 1196139 | Walsingham House More images | Q26490684 |
| 36, 36A and 38, Castle Street | II | 36, 36A and 38, Castle Street | | | 28 November 1951 | TL5382538743; 52°01′33″N 0°14′26″E | | 1196140 | 36, 36A and 38, Castle Street More images | Q26490685 |
| 37, Castle Street | II | 37, Castle Street | | | 31 October 1994 | TL5368438680; 52°01′31″N 0°14′19″E | | 1297773 | 37, Castle Street More images | Q26585325 |
| 39, Castle Street | II | 39, Castle Street | | | 31 October 1994 | TL5369438682; 52°01′31″N 0°14′19″E | | 1196141 | 39, Castle Street More images | Q26490686 |
| 40, Castle Street | II | 40, Castle Street | | | 1 November 1972 | TL5383338746; 52°01′33″N 0°14′27″E | | 1297774 | 40, Castle Street More images | Q26585326 |
| 41 and 43, Castle Street | II* | 41 and 43, Castle Street | | | 28 November 1951 | TL5369738692; 52°01′31″N 0°14′20″E | | 1280720 | 41 and 43, Castle Street More images | Q17534627 |
| 42 and 44, Castle Street | II | 42 and 44, Castle Street | | | 1 November 1972 | TL5384538752; 52°01′33″N 0°14′27″E | | 1196142 | 42 and 44, Castle Street More images | Q26490687 |
| 45 and 47, Castle Street | II* | 45 and 47, Castle Street | | | 28 November 1951 | TL5370438693; 52°01′31″N 0°14′20″E | | 1205408 | 45 and 47, Castle Street More images | Q17534241 |
| 46 and 48, Castle Street | II | 46 and 48, Castle Street | | | 31 October 1994 | TL5385038749; 52°01′33″N 0°14′28″E | | 1297775 | 46 and 48, Castle Street More images | Q26585327 |
| 49 and 51, Castle Street | II* | 49 and 51, Castle Street | | | 28 November 1951 | TL5371138698; 52°01′31″N 0°14′20″E | | 1205418 | 49 and 51, Castle Street More images | Q17534253 |
| 50, Castle Street | II | 50, Castle Street | | | 1 November 1972 | TL5386538755; 52°01′33″N 0°14′28″E | | 1205429 | 50, Castle Street More images | Q26500770 |
| 54 and 54A, Castle Street | II | 54 and 54A, Castle Street | | | 1 November 1972 | TL5388038752; 52°01′33″N 0°14′29″E | | 1196143 | 54 and 54A, Castle Street More images | Q26490688 |
| 55, Castle Street | II | 55, Castle Street | | | 28 November 1951 | TL5371838707; 52°01′32″N 0°14′21″E | | 1280738 | 55, Castle Street More images | Q26569835 |
| 56, Castle Street | II | 56, Castle Street | | | 1 November 1972 | TL5389038759; 52°01′33″N 0°14′30″E | | 1196144 | 56, Castle Street More images | Q26490689 |
| 58, 60, 62 and 64, Castle Street | II | 58, 60, 62 and 64, Castle Street | | | 1 November 1972 | TL5389438761; 52°01′33″N 0°14′30″E | | 1205445 | 58, 60, 62 and 64, Castle Street More images | Q26500784 |
| 59, Castle Street | II | 59, Castle Street | | | 28 November 1951 | TL5373438715; 52°01′32″N 0°14′22″E | | 1297776 | 59, Castle Street More images | Q26585328 |
| 61 and 63, Castle Street | II | 61 and 63, Castle Street | | | 28 November 1951 | TL5373838719; 52°01′32″N 0°14′22″E | | 1205451 | 61 and 63, Castle Street More images | Q26500790 |
| 65, 67 and 69, Castle Street | II | 65, 67 and 69, Castle Street | | | 28 November 1951 | TL5374838724; 52°01′32″N 0°14′22″E | | 1196145 | 65, 67 and 69, Castle Street More images | Q26490690 |
| 66-72, Castle Street | II | 66-72, Castle Street | | | 31 October 1994 | TL5390838764; 52°01′33″N 0°14′31″E | | 1280709 | 66-72, Castle Street More images | Q26569812 |
| 71, Castle Street | II | 71, Castle Street | | | 28 November 1951 | TL5377838742; 52°01′33″N 0°14′24″E | | 1297777 | 71, Castle Street More images | Q26585329 |
| 73 and 75, Castle Street | II | 73 and 75, Castle Street | | | 28 November 1951 | TL5378438745; 52°01′33″N 0°14′24″E | | 1205472 | 73 and 75, Castle Street More images | Q26500811 |
| 109, Castle Street | II | 109, Castle Street | | | 1 November 1951 | TL5393838788; 52°01′34″N 0°14′32″E | | 1196146 | 109, Castle Street More images | Q26490691 |
| Numbers 1-4 Bellingham Buildings | II | Numbers 1-4 Bellingham Buildings, Castle Street | | | 31 October 1994 | TL5367638695; 52°01′31″N 0°14′18″E | | 1205503 | Upload Photo | Q26500841 |
| Church of Our Lady of Compassion | II | Castle Street | | | 28 November 1951 | TL5366238626; 52°01′29″N 0°14′18″E | | 1205487 | Church of Our Lady of Compassion More images | Q26500826 |
| Methodist Church | II | Castle Street | | | 31 October 1994 | TL5376038739; 52°01′33″N 0°14′23″E | | 1297778 | Methodist Church More images | Q26585330 |
| Prospect House | II | Castle Street | | | 1 November 1972 | TL5373638759; 52°01′33″N 0°14′22″E | | 1196147 | Prospect House More images | Q26490692 |
| 1 and 2, Chaters Hill | II | 1 and 2, Chaters Hill | | | 1 November 1972 | TL5429338653; 52°01′29″N 0°14′51″E | | 1205504 | Upload Photo | Q26500842 |
| Grove Lodge | II | 3, Chaters Hill | | | 1 November 1972 | TL5430038631; 52°01′29″N 0°14′51″E | | 1196148 | Upload Photo | Q26490693 |
| The Grove | II | 4, Chaters Hill | | | 1 November 1972 | TL5433238595; 52°01′28″N 0°14′53″E | | 1205508 | Upload Photo | Q26500846 |
| 1, Church Path | II | 1, Church Path | | | 28 November 1951 | TL5373238560; 52°01′27″N 0°14′21″E | | 1297779 | 1, Church Path More images | Q26585331 |
| 2 and 4, Church Path | II | 2 and 4, Church Path | | | 28 November 1951 | TL5373138564; 52°01′27″N 0°14′21″E | | 1280695 | 2 and 4, Church Path More images | Q26569800 |
| 6, Church Street | II | 6, Church Street | | | 28 November 1951 | TL5371838546; 52°01′27″N 0°14′20″E | | 1196149 | Upload Photo | Q26490694 |
| Outbuilding North of Numbers 6 and 6A | II | 6 and 6A, Church Street | | | 1 November 1972 | TL5371538574; 52°01′27″N 0°14′20″E | | 1196150 | Upload Photo | Q26490695 |
| 6A, Church Street | II | 6A, Church Street | | | 28 November 1951 | TL5372938556; 52°01′27″N 0°14′21″E | | 1280697 | Upload Photo | Q26569802 |
| Sparrows Charity | II* | 9, Church Street | | | 28 November 1951 | TL5373638535; 52°01′26″N 0°14′21″E | | 1205520 | Sparrows Charity More images | Q17534264 |
| 14, 16 and 18, Church Street | II | 14, 16 and 18, Church Street | | | 28 November 1951 | TL5377938579; 52°01′28″N 0°14′24″E | | 1205555 | Upload Photo | Q26500889 |
| 15, Church Street | II | 15, Church Street | | | 25 October 1973 | TL5375338543; 52°01′26″N 0°14′22″E | | 1196152 | Upload Photo | Q26490697 |
| 17, Church Street | II | 17, Church Street | | | 1 November 1972 | TL5376438551; 52°01′27″N 0°14′23″E | | 1205572 | 17, Church Street More images | Q26500903 |
| Ashcroft Court | II* | 19 and 21, Church Street | | | 28 November 1951 | TL5377838562; 52°01′27″N 0°14′24″E | | 1196153 | Ashcroft Court More images | Q17534063 |
| 20, Church Street | II | 20, Church Street | | | 1 November 1972 | TL5379138588; 52°01′28″N 0°14′24″E | | 1205577 | Upload Photo | Q26500908 |
| Cromwell House | II* | 23, Church Street | | | 28 November 1951 | TL5378838566; 52°01′27″N 0°14′24″E | | 1196154 | Cromwell House More images | Q17534078 |
| 24, Church Street | II | 24, Church Street | | | 28 November 1951 | TL5381338602; 52°01′28″N 0°14′25″E | | 1280654 | Upload Photo | Q26569764 |
| 25 and 27, Church Street | I | 25 and 27, Church Street | | | 28 November 1951 | TL5379838572; 52°01′27″N 0°14′25″E | | 1196155 | 25 and 27, Church Street More images | Q17539600 |
| 26, Church Street | II | 26, Church Street | | | 28 November 1951 | TL5382838613; 52°01′29″N 0°14′26″E | | 1205602 | 26, Church Street More images | Q26500926 |
| 26A and 28, Church Street | II | 26A and 28, Church Street | | | 28 November 1951 | TL5383338606; 52°01′28″N 0°14′27″E | | 1196156 | 26A and 28, Church Street More images | Q26490698 |
| 29 and 31, Church Street | I | 29 and 31, Church Street | | | 28 November 1951 | TL5381138578; 52°01′27″N 0°14′25″E | | 1205611 | 29 and 31, Church Street More images | Q17539668 |
| 30 and 32, Church Street | II | 30 and 32, Church Street | | | 28 November 1951 | TL5384238611; 52°01′29″N 0°14′27″E | | 1297780 | 30 and 32, Church Street More images | Q26585332 |
| The Grange and Garden Wall to Church Street | II | 33, Church Street | | | 1 November 1972 | TL5391638634; 52°01′29″N 0°14′31″E | | 1205618 | The Grange and Garden Wall to Church Street More images | Q26500938 |
| 34 and 36, Church Street | II | 34 and 36, Church Street | | | 1 November 1972 | TL5384938616; 52°01′29″N 0°14′27″E | | 1196157 | 34 and 36, Church Street More images | Q26490699 |
| 35 and 37, Church Street | II | 35 and 37, Church Street | | | 1 November 1972 | TL5392238645; 52°01′30″N 0°14′31″E | | 1297781 | 35 and 37, Church Street More images | Q26585333 |
| Numbers 2 and 3 Johnsons Yard | II | Numbers 2 and 3 Johnsons Yard, Church Street | | | 1 November 1972 | TL5383638637; 52°01′29″N 0°14′27″E | | 1297782 | Upload Photo | Q26684013 |
| Garden House to Rear of Numbers 14, 16 and 18 | II | Church Street | | | 31 October 1994 | TL5378038590; 52°01′28″N 0°14′24″E | | 1196151 | Upload Photo | Q26490696 |
| Garden Wall at Rear of Numbers 14, 16 and 18 | II | Church Street | | | 31 October 1994 | TL5377338602; 52°01′28″N 0°14′23″E | | 1205561 | Upload Photo | Q26500895 |
| Wall to Walden Castle Bounding Church Street and Castle Hill | II | Church Street | | | 1 November 1972 | TL5395938687; 52°01′31″N 0°14′33″E | | 1196159 | Upload Photo | Q26490701 |
| Parish Room Vergers Cottage | II | Church Yard | | | 1 November 1972 | TL5371638647; 52°01′30″N 0°14′20″E | | 1196160 | Parish Room Vergers Cottage More images | Q26490702 |
| The Priory | II* | 3, Common Hill | | | 28 November 1951 | TL5396438562; 52°01′27″N 0°14′33″E | | 1297783 | The Priory More images | Q17534674 |
| 4 and 5, Common Hill | II | 4 and 5, Common Hill | | | 31 October 1994 | TL5393638601; 52°01′28″N 0°14′32″E | | 1297784 | 4 and 5, Common Hill More images | Q26585335 |
| 7, Common Hill | II | 7, Common Hill | | | 1 November 1972 | TL5394438632; 52°01′29″N 0°14′32″E | | 1196162 | 7, Common Hill More images | Q26490704 |
| 9, Common Hill | II | 9, Common Hill | | | 1 November 1972 | TL5394638637; 52°01′29″N 0°14′32″E | | 1205663 | 9, Common Hill More images | Q26500976 |
| Cromwell Lodge | II | 10, Common Hill | | | 1 November 1972 | TL5393638652; 52°01′30″N 0°14′32″E | | 1196163 | Upload Photo | Q26490705 |
| Gazebo and Wall Adjoining North East Corner | II | Common Hill | | | 10 August 1990 | TL5396238580; 52°01′27″N 0°14′33″E | | 1196161 | Upload Photo | Q26490703 |
| Wall at North East End of Empson Close | II | Common Hill | | | 28 November 1951 | TL5395138593; 52°01′28″N 0°14′33″E | | 1205673 | Upload Photo | Q26500983 |
| Former Police station including area railings, gateway and walls | II | 5-7, Constable Place, East Street | | | 1 November 1972 | TL5406938479; 52°01′24″N 0°14′39″E | | 1297748 | Upload Photo | Q26585302 |
| 2 and 4, Cross Street | II | 2 and 4, Cross Street | | | 1 November 1972 | TL5379838420; 52°01′22″N 0°14′24″E | | 1205679 | Upload Photo | Q26500988 |
| 6, Cross Street | II | 6, Cross Street | | | 1 November 1972 | TL5379938431; 52°01′23″N 0°14′24″E | | 1196164 | Upload Photo | Q26490706 |
| 1-9, Debden Road | II | 1-9, Debden Road | | | 31 October 1994 | TL5377338090; 52°01′12″N 0°14′23″E | | 1280585 | Upload Photo | Q26569704 |
| 64, Debden Road | II | 64, Debden Road | | | 29 July 1991 | TL5383037807; 52°01′03″N 0°14′25″E | | 1297786 | Upload Photo | Q26585337 |
| Barn and Stable West of Roos Farmhouse | II | Debden Road | | | 31 October 1994 | TL5478936059; 52°00′05″N 0°15′12″E | | 1196165 | Upload Photo | Q26490707 |
| Barn at Herberts Farm | II | Debden Road | | | 1 November 1972 | TL5458636815; 52°00′30″N 0°15′03″E | | 1205692 | Upload Photo | Q26501001 |
| Roos Farmhouse | II | Debden Road | | | 28 November 1951 | TL5481336071; 52°00′05″N 0°15′14″E | | 1280593 | Upload Photo | Q26569711 |
| Water Tower | II | Debden Road | | | 31 October 1994 | TL5388337659; 52°00′58″N 0°14′28″E | | 1205709 | Upload Photo | Q26501016 |
| Boys British School | II | 1, 2 and 3, East Street | | | 1 November 1972 | TL5412938471; 52°01′24″N 0°14′42″E | | 1205768 | Upload Photo | Q26501058 |
| 11, East Street | II | 11, East Street | | | 1 November 1972 | TL5411238469; 52°01′24″N 0°14′41″E | | 1280561 | Upload Photo | Q26569682 |
| 12, East Street | II | 12, East Street | | | 1 November 1972 | TL5407038451; 52°01′23″N 0°14′39″E | | 1196166 | Upload Photo | Q26490708 |
| 17-37, East Street | II | 17-37, East Street | | | 8 April 1974 | TL5417438453; 52°01′23″N 0°14′44″E | | 1280544 | Upload Photo | Q26569666 |
| Waggon and Horses Public House | II | 39, East Street | | | 1 November 1972 | TL5422138438; 52°01′23″N 0°14′47″E | | 1196167 | Upload Photo | Q26490709 |
| The Folly | II | Elm Grove | | | 24 March 1981 | TL5397538280; 52°01′18″N 0°14′33″E | | 1280546 | Upload Photo | Q26569667 |
| 10, Emson Close, 9 Market Place | II | 10, Emson Close, 9 Market Place | | | 28 November 1951 | TL5389538556; 52°01′27″N 0°14′30″E | | 1196221 | Upload Photo | Q26490757 |
| 8-22, Fairycroft Road | II | 8-22, Fairycroft Road | | | 31 October 1994 | TL5403438390; 52°01′21″N 0°14′37″E | | 1280547 | Upload Photo | Q26569668 |
| Farmadine House | II | Farmadine | | | 1 November 1972 | TL5425838359; 52°01′20″N 0°14′48″E | | 1280548 | Upload Photo | Q26569669 |
| 1, Freshwell Street | II* | 1, Freshwell Street | | | 28 November 1951 | TL5355538642; 52°01′30″N 0°14′12″E | | 1297749 | 1, Freshwell Street More images | Q17534653 |
| 2, 4 and 6, Freshwell Street | II | 2, 4 and 6, Freshwell Street | | | 1 November 1972 | TL5353638645; 52°01′30″N 0°14′11″E | | 1205774 | Upload Photo | Q26501063 |
| 3 and 5, Freshwell Street | II | 3 and 5, Freshwell Street | | | 28 November 1951 | TL5354738637; 52°01′30″N 0°14′12″E | | 1196169 | 3 and 5, Freshwell Street More images | Q26490711 |
| 8, Freshwell Street | II | 8, Freshwell Street | | | 1 November 1972 | TL5351638628; 52°01′29″N 0°14′10″E | | 1205780 | Upload Photo | Q26501069 |
| 9, 11 and 13, Freshwell Street | II | 9, 11 and 13, Freshwell Street | | | 31 October 1994 | TL5353738624; 52°01′29″N 0°14′11″E | | 1196170 | Upload Photo | Q26490712 |
| 14, Freshwell Street | II | 14, Freshwell Street | | | 1 November 1972 | TL5349338590; 52°01′28″N 0°14′09″E | | 1205786 | Upload Photo | Q26501075 |
| 15, Freshwell Street | II | 15, Freshwell Street | | | 28 November 1951 | TL5352438615; 52°01′29″N 0°14′10″E | | 1297750 | Upload Photo | Q26585303 |
| Almshouse Tenements | II | 19, 19A, 21 and 21A, Freshwell Street | | | 1 November 1972 | TL5351238573; 52°01′28″N 0°14′10″E | | 1205793 | Upload Photo | Q26501079 |
| Fearns | II | 22, Freshwell Street | | | 28 November 1951 | TL5348438569; 52°01′28″N 0°14′08″E | | 1196171 | Upload Photo | Q26490713 |
| Freshwell House | II | Freshwell Street | | | 28 November 1951 | TL5349838608; 52°01′29″N 0°14′09″E | | 1205801 | Upload Photo | Q26501087 |
| Garden Wall of Walden Place | II | Freshwell Street | | | 28 November 1951 | TL5352638416; 52°01′23″N 0°14′10″E | | 1196172 | Upload Photo | Q26490714 |
| Outbuildings to North of Freshwell House | II | Freshwell Street | | | 14 April 1983 | TL5350138628; 52°01′29″N 0°14′09″E | | 1205811 | Upload Photo | Q26501096 |
| 17 and 17A, George Street | II | 17 and 17A, George Street | | | 1 November 1972 | TL5379538412; 52°01′22″N 0°14′24″E | | 1205826 | Upload Photo | Q26501110 |
| 4, Gold Street | II | 4, Gold Street | | | 1 November 1972 | TL5380438369; 52°01′21″N 0°14′25″E | | 1196173 | Upload Photo | Q26490715 |
| 13, Gold Street | II | 13, Gold Street | | | 28 November 1951 | TL5385238348; 52°01′20″N 0°14′27″E | | 1196174 | Upload Photo | Q26490716 |
| 14-22, Gold Street | II | 14-22, Gold Street | | | 31 October 1994 | TL5381638331; 52°01′19″N 0°14′25″E | | 1205854 | Upload Photo | Q26501135 |
| 21, Gold Street | II | 21, Gold Street | | | 1 November 1972 | TL5383638294; 52°01′18″N 0°14′26″E | | 1196175 | Upload Photo | Q26490717 |
| 23, 25 and 27, Gold Street | II | 23, 25 and 27, Gold Street | | | 28 November 1951 | TL5384638318; 52°01′19″N 0°14′27″E | | 1205875 | Upload Photo | Q26501155 |
| 29 and 33, Gold Street | II | 29 and 33, Gold Street | | | 1 November 1972 | TL5385338290; 52°01′18″N 0°14′27″E | | 1196176 | Upload Photo | Q26490718 |
| 30 and 32, Gold Street | II | 30 and 32, Gold Street | | | 1 November 1972 | TL5383338281; 52°01′18″N 0°14′26″E | | 1196177 | Upload Photo | Q26490719 |
| 34, 36 and 38, Gold Street | II | 34, 36 and 38, Gold Street | | | 28 November 1951 | TL5383438277; 52°01′18″N 0°14′26″E | | 1196178 | Upload Photo | Q26490720 |
| 35-49, Gold Street | II | 35-49, Gold Street | | | 1 November 1972 | TL5385938266; 52°01′17″N 0°14′27″E | | 1196179 | Upload Photo | Q26490721 |
| 40, Gold Street | II | 40, Gold Street | | | 28 November 1951 | TL5383638265; 52°01′17″N 0°14′26″E | | 1297751 | Upload Photo | Q26585304 |
| 42, 44 and 46, Gold Street | II | 42, 44 and 46, Gold Street | | | 28 November 1951 | TL5383838258; 52°01′17″N 0°14′26″E | | 1196180 | Upload Photo | Q26490722 |
| 48-58, Gold Street | II | 48-58, Gold Street | | | 28 November 1951 | TL5384538237; 52°01′16″N 0°14′27″E | | 1297752 | Upload Photo | Q26585305 |
| Dolphin House | II | 6 and 6A, Gold Street | | | 28 November 1951 | TL5380738359; 52°01′20″N 0°14′25″E | | 1205833 | Upload Photo | Q26501117 |
| 62, Gold Street | II | 62, Gold Street | | | 15 October 1992 | TL5381638229; 52°01′16″N 0°14′25″E | | 1196181 | 62, Gold Street More images | Q26490723 |
| 4, High Street | II | 4, High Street | | | 28 November 1951 | TL5365438557; 52°01′27″N 0°14′17″E | | 1196183 | 4, High Street More images | Q26490725 |
| 5, High Street | II | 5, High Street | | | 28 November 1951 | TL5361338566; 52°01′27″N 0°14′15″E | | 1297754 | 5, High Street More images | Q26585307 |
| Number 7 Including Bollards, Chains and Wall to North Wall to South Side of Myddylton Place | II | 7, High Street | | | 28 November 1951 | TL5363238546; 52°01′27″N 0°14′16″E | | 1280447 | Number 7 Including Bollards, Chains and Wall to North Wall to South Side of Myddylton Place More images | Q26569583 |
| Numbers 7A and 9 Including Bollards in Front | II | 7A and 9, High Street | | | 1 November 1972 | TL5362838542; 52°01′26″N 0°14′16″E | | 1196184 | Numbers 7A and 9 Including Bollards in Front More images | Q26490726 |
| The Saffron Hotel (Part) | II | 8, High Street | | | 28 November 1951 | TL5366138546; 52°01′27″N 0°14′17″E | | 1205973 | The Saffron Hotel (Part) More images | Q26501245 |
| The Saffron Hotel (Part) | II | 10, High Street | | | 28 November 1951 | TL5366738539; 52°01′26″N 0°14′18″E | | 1297755 | The Saffron Hotel (Part) More images | Q26893144 |
| The Saffron Hotel (Part) | II | 12, High Street | | | 28 November 1951 | TL5367738530; 52°01′26″N 0°14′18″E | | 1205979 | The Saffron Hotel (Part) More images | Q26678937 |
| 14, High Street | II | 14, High Street | | | 1 November 1972 | TL5368038521; 52°01′26″N 0°14′18″E | | 1196185 | 14, High Street More images | Q26490727 |
| Cambridge House | II | 16, High Street | | | 1 November 1972 | TL5369438508; 52°01′25″N 0°14′19″E | | 1205984 | Cambridge House More images | Q26501254 |
| 17, High Street | II | 17, High Street | | | 29 August 1969 | TL5366538508; 52°01′25″N 0°14′18″E | | 1196186 | Upload Photo | Q26490728 |
| Army and Navy Stores | II | 18, High Street | | | 28 November 1951 | TL5369838497; 52°01′25″N 0°14′19″E | | 1280456 | Army and Navy Stores More images | Q26569591 |
| 19, High Street | II | 19, High Street | | | 29 August 1969 | TL5366938503; 52°01′25″N 0°14′18″E | | 1297756 | Upload Photo | Q26585309 |
| Army and Navy Stores (Part) | II | 20, High Street | | | 28 November 1951 | TL5369838491; 52°01′25″N 0°14′19″E | | 1280459 | Army and Navy Stores (Part) More images | Q26569593 |
| 21, High Street | II* | 21, High Street | | | 29 August 1969 | TL5367738497; 52°01′25″N 0°14′18″E | | 1196187 | Upload Photo | Q17534091 |
| 23 and 23A, High Street | II | 23 and 23A, High Street | | | 29 August 1969 | TL5367438486; 52°01′25″N 0°14′18″E | | 1205999 | Upload Photo | Q26501265 |
| 24 and 24A, High Street | II | 24 and 24A, High Street | | | 1 November 1972 | TL5370738478; 52°01′24″N 0°14′20″E | | 1206004 | 24 and 24A, High Street More images | Q26501270 |
| Radio Supplies | II | 25, High Street | | | 29 August 1969 | TL5367738481; 52°01′24″N 0°14′18″E | | 1297757 | Upload Photo | Q26585310 |
| 27 and 29, High Street | II | 27 and 29, High Street | | | 29 August 1969 | TL5368638469; 52°01′24″N 0°14′19″E | | 1206007 | Upload Photo | Q26501273 |
| Cross Keys Hotel | II* | 32, High Street | | | 28 November 1951 | TL5373338455; 52°01′24″N 0°14′21″E | | 1196188 | Cross Keys Hotel More images | Q17534102 |
| General Post Office | II | 37, High Street | | | 31 July 1970 | TL5369938432; 52°01′23″N 0°14′19″E | | 1206010 | General Post Office More images | Q26501276 |
| 38, High Street | II | 38, High Street | | | 31 October 1994 | TL5372938418; 52°01′22″N 0°14′21″E | | 1196189 | 38, High Street More images | Q26490729 |
| 40, High Street | II | 40, High Street | | | 1 November 1972 | TL5372938403; 52°01′22″N 0°14′21″E | | 1206012 | 40, High Street More images | Q26501279 |
| 42, High Street, 1 George Street | II | 42, High Street, 1 George Street | | | 1 November 1972 | TL5373238396; 52°01′22″N 0°14′21″E | | 1297758 | 42, High Street, 1 George Street More images | Q26585311 |
| 44 and 46, High Street | II | 44 and 46, High Street | | | 28 November 1951 | TL5374338382; 52°01′21″N 0°14′21″E | | 1280439 | 44 and 46, High Street More images | Q26569576 |
| 47, High Street | II | 47, High Street | | | 1 November 1972 | TL5370538404; 52°01′22″N 0°14′19″E | | 1196190 | Upload Photo | Q26490730 |
| Number 53 and Attached Walls | II* | 53, High Street | | | 28 November 1951 | TL5371938363; 52°01′21″N 0°14′20″E | | 1206038 | Upload Photo | Q17534276 |
| Comrades Club | II | 55, High Street | | | 1 November 1972 | TL5372638342; 52°01′20″N 0°14′20″E | | 1297759 | Upload Photo | Q26585312 |
| Entrance Arch of Numbers 56, 58 and 60 | II | 56, 58 and 60, High Street | | | 31 October 1994 | TL5375938322; 52°01′19″N 0°14′22″E | | 1196191 | Upload Photo | Q26490731 |
| Goddards Electrical | II | 56, 58 and 60, High Street | | | 1 November 1972 | TL5376238341; 52°01′20″N 0°14′22″E | | 1280406 | Upload Photo | Q26569545 |
| 57, High Street | II | 57, High Street | | | 28 November 1951 | TL5373138326; 52°01′19″N 0°14′21″E | | 1206056 | Upload Photo | Q26501318 |
| 59, High Street | II | 59, High Street | | | 28 November 1951 | TL5373438317; 52°01′19″N 0°14′21″E | | 1206060 | Upload Photo | Q26501320 |
| 61 and 63, High Street | II | 61 and 63, High Street | | | 1 November 1972 | TL5373638311; 52°01′19″N 0°14′21″E | | 1196192 | Upload Photo | Q26490732 |
| 62, High Street | II | 62, High Street | | | 1 November 1972 | TL5376438314; 52°01′19″N 0°14′22″E | | 1206068 | Upload Photo | Q26501329 |
| Number 67 and Garden Walls | II | 67, High Street | | | 28 November 1951 | TL5374238283; 52°01′18″N 0°14′21″E | | 1280383 | Upload Photo | Q26569524 |
| 71, High Street | II | 71, High Street | | | 17 June 1982 | TL5374938239; 52°01′17″N 0°14′22″E | | 1196193 | Upload Photo | Q26490733 |
| 72, High Street | II | 72, High Street | | | 28 November 1951 | TL5377938272; 52°01′18″N 0°14′23″E | | 1206088 | Upload Photo | Q26501349 |
| Outbuilding 10 Metres South East of Number 72 | II | 72, High Street | | | 31 October 1994 | TL5379438263; 52°01′17″N 0°14′24″E | | 1196194 | Upload Photo | Q26490734 |
| 73, High Street | II | 73, High Street | | | 28 November 1951 | TL5375438228; 52°01′16″N 0°14′22″E | | 1206095 | Upload Photo | Q26501355 |
| St Kilda and Forecourt Railings | II | 74, High Street | | | 1 November 1972 | TL5378638256; 52°01′17″N 0°14′23″E | | 1196195 | Upload Photo | Q26490735 |
| Hill House Including Frontage Wall to North and Boundary Wall | II | 75, High Street | | | 1 November 1972 | TL5376238205; 52°01′15″N 0°14′22″E | | 1206101 | Hill House Including Frontage Wall to North and Boundary Wall More images | Q21061729 |
| 76, High Street | II | 76, High Street | | | 1 November 1972 | TL5379238234; 52°01′16″N 0°14′24″E | | 1206200 | Upload Photo | Q26501448 |
| 76A, High Street | II | 76A, High Street | | | 1 November 1972 | TL5378438243; 52°01′17″N 0°14′23″E | | 1196197 | Upload Photo | Q26490737 |
| Numbers 77 and 77A and Walls | II | 77 and 77A, High Street | | | 28 November 1951 | TL5376738173; 52°01′14″N 0°14′22″E | | 1280330 | Upload Photo | Q26569477 |
| 78, 80 and 82, High Street | II | 78, 80 and 82, High Street | | | 1 November 1972 | TL5379038228; 52°01′16″N 0°14′24″E | | 1196198 | Upload Photo | Q26490738 |
| Number 79 and Garden Wall | II | 79, High Street | | | 31 October 1994 | TL5376738125; 52°01′13″N 0°14′22″E | | 1196199 | Upload Photo | Q26490739 |
| 81, High Street | II | 81, High Street | | | 17 June 1982 | TL5376438112; 52°01′12″N 0°14′22″E | | 1196200 | Upload Photo | Q26490740 |
| Lamp Post in Front of Numbers 89 and 90 | II | 89 and 90, High Street | | | 31 October 1994 | TL5379938136; 52°01′13″N 0°14′24″E | | 1297761 | Upload Photo | Q26585314 |
| Duke of York Public House | II | 96, High Street | | | 1 November 1972 | TL5378938109; 52°01′12″N 0°14′23″E | | 1196201 | Duke of York Public House More images | Q26490741 |
| Abbey House and 2 Rear Ranges of Former Outbuildings | II | High Street | | | 1 November 1972 | TL5371438388; 52°01′21″N 0°14′20″E | | 1297762 | Upload Photo | Q26585315 |
| Boundary Wall and Gate on West and South of Public Gardens Between the Close and Number 4 High Street | II | High Street | | | 31 October 1994 | TL5364638562; 52°01′27″N 0°14′17″E | | 1205952 | Upload Photo | Q26501224 |
| Dance School, Former Maltings | II | High Street | | | 31 October 1994 | TL5374038411; 52°01′22″N 0°14′21″E | | 1196202 | Upload Photo | Q26490742 |
| Garden Wall to Number 5 | II | High Street | | | 1 November 1972 | TL5360038542; 52°01′27″N 0°14′14″E | | 1280442 | Upload Photo | Q26569579 |
| Numbers 65, 65A and 65B and Outbuilding and Garden Walls to Rear | II | High Street | | | 28 November 1951 | TL5374038295; 52°01′18″N 0°14′21″E | | 1297760 | Upload Photo | Q26585313 |
| Telephone Box in Front of Hill House | II | High Street | | | 25 November 1987 | TL5377438202; 52°01′15″N 0°14′23″E | | 1196196 | Upload Photo | Q26490736 |
| The Close | II | High Street | | | 28 November 1951 | TL5361638606; 52°01′29″N 0°14′15″E | | 1196182 | The Close More images | Q26490724 |
| War Memorial | II | High Street | | | 31 October 1994 | TL5379838150; 52°01′14″N 0°14′24″E | | 1297763 | War Memorial More images | Q26585316 |
| 1 and 3, Hill Street | II | 1 and 3, Hill Street | | | 1 November 1972 | TL5382138403; 52°01′22″N 0°14′26″E | | 1196203 | Upload Photo | Q26490743 |
| Jubilee House | II* | 5, Hill Street | | | 28 November 1951 | TL5387838426; 52°01′22″N 0°14′29″E | | 1196204 | Jubilee House More images | Q17534116 |
| 12, Hill Street | II | 12, Hill Street | | | 1 November 1972 | TL5394338489; 52°01′24″N 0°14′32″E | | 1297764 | Upload Photo | Q26585317 |
| 13, Hill Street | II | 13, Hill Street | | | 31 October 1994 | TL5392738449; 52°01′23″N 0°14′31″E | | 1206286 | Upload Photo | Q26501526 |
| 14, Hill Street | II | 14, Hill Street | | | 1 November 1972 | TL5396338491; 52°01′25″N 0°14′33″E | | 1280294 | Upload Photo | Q26569448 |
| 15, Hill Street | II | 15, Hill Street | | | 31 October 1994 | TL5393738454; 52°01′23″N 0°14′32″E | | 1196205 | Upload Photo | Q26490744 |
| 17 and 19, Hill Street | II | 17 and 19, Hill Street | | | 31 October 1994 | TL5394138456; 52°01′23″N 0°14′32″E | | 1280297 | Upload Photo | Q26569451 |
| 25 and 25A, Hill Street | II | 25 and 25A, Hill Street | | | 28 November 1951 | TL5396938458; 52°01′23″N 0°14′33″E | | 1297765 | 25 and 25A, Hill Street More images | Q26585318 |
| 27, Hill Street | II | 27, Hill Street | | | 1 November 1972 | TL5398038457; 52°01′23″N 0°14′34″E | | 1280266 | Upload Photo | Q26569421 |
| Garden wall of Jubilee Gardens | II | Hill Street | | | 1 November 1972 | TL5385038421; 52°01′22″N 0°14′27″E | | 1206267 | Upload Photo | Q26501508 |
| Sullivan House, Former Baptist Chapel | II | Hill Street | | | 28 November 1951 | TL5397338416; 52°01′22″N 0°14′34″E | | 1196206 | Sullivan House, Former Baptist Chapel More images | Q26490745 |
| Number 1 Johnsons Yard | II | 1, Johnsons Yard | | | 1 November 1972 | TL5383838622; 52°01′29″N 0°14′27″E | | 1196158 | Upload Photo | Q26490700 |
| Public Library | II | 2, King Street | | | 1 November 1972 | TL5382938506; 52°01′25″N 0°14′26″E | | 1206321 | Upload Photo | Q26501560 |
| 4, King Street | II | 4, King Street | | | 1 November 1972 | TL5382238502; 52°01′25″N 0°14′26″E | | 1196207 | Upload Photo | Q26490746 |
| 6, King Street | II | 6, King Street | | | 1 November 1972 | TL5381538502; 52°01′25″N 0°14′25″E | | 1206328 | Upload Photo | Q26501565 |
| 9 and 11, King Street | II | 9 and 11, King Street | | | 1 November 1972 | TL5382838477; 52°01′24″N 0°14′26″E | | 1297766 | Upload Photo | Q26585319 |
| 13A and 15, King Street | II* | 13A and 15, King Street | | | 28 November 1951 | TL5381038472; 52°01′24″N 0°14′25″E | | 1196208 | 13A and 15, King Street More images | Q17534128 |
| 17, 19 and 21, King Street | II* | 17, 19 and 21, King Street | | | 28 November 1951 | TL5379238457; 52°01′24″N 0°14′24″E | | 1206346 | 17, 19 and 21, King Street More images | Q17534288 |
| 18 and 20, King Street | II | 18 and 20, King Street | | | 1 November 1972 | TL5377638484; 52°01′24″N 0°14′23″E | | 1297767 | Upload Photo | Q26585320 |
| 20A and 22, King Street | II | 20A and 22, King Street | | | 28 November 1951 | TL5376838476; 52°01′24″N 0°14′23″E | | 1280251 | Upload Photo | Q26569407 |
| Carriageway to Alley Between Numbers 22 and 26 | II | King Street | | | 28 November 1951 | TL5376638466; 52°01′24″N 0°14′23″E | | 1196209 | Upload Photo | Q26490747 |
| 26, King Street | II | 26, King Street | | | 28 November 1951 | TL5375038483; 52°01′24″N 0°14′22″E | | 1280255 | Upload Photo | Q26569411 |
| 28, 30 and 32, King Street | II | 28, 30 and 32, King Street | | | 1 November 1972 | TL5375738465; 52°01′24″N 0°14′22″E | | 1297728 | 28, 30 and 32, King Street More images | Q26585284 |
| 34, King Street | II | 34, King Street | | | 7 November 1975 | TL5374038458; 52°01′24″N 0°14′21″E | | 1206379 | 34, King Street More images | Q26501605 |
| Lime Tree Court | II | Lime Tree Passage | | | 1 November 1972 | TL5379838528; 52°01′26″N 0°14′25″E | | 1206387 | Upload Photo | Q26501611 |
| 2, Little Walden Road | II | 2, Little Walden Road | | | 1 November 1972 | TL5395938792; 52°01′34″N 0°14′33″E | | 1196210 | 2, Little Walden Road More images | Q26490748 |
| Cinder Hall | II | Little Walden Road | | | 1 November 1972 | TL5412640239; 52°02′21″N 0°14′45″E | | 1280263 | Upload Photo | Q26569418 |
| The Victory Public House | II | Little Walden Road | | | 1 November 1972 | TL5393538795; 52°01′34″N 0°14′32″E | | 1196211 | Upload Photo | Q26490749 |
| Ivy Lodge | II | 13, London Road | | | 1 November 1972 | TL5364837928; 52°01′07″N 0°14′16″E | | 1206408 | Upload Photo | Q26501629 |
| 14, London Road | II | 14, London Road | | | 31 October 1994 | TL5373538075; 52°01′11″N 0°14′21″E | | 1297730 | Upload Photo | Q26585286 |
| 15, London Road | II | 15, London Road | | | 1 November 1972 | TL5363237912; 52°01′06″N 0°14′15″E | | 1206414 | Upload Photo | Q26501635 |
| 2 and 4, London Road | II | 2 and 4, London Road | | | 31 October 1994 | TL5375538097; 52°01′12″N 0°14′22″E | | 1206398 | Upload Photo | Q26501621 |
| Linden Lodge and Garden Wall | II | 3, London Road | | | 1 November 1972 | TL5373738027; 52°01′10″N 0°14′21″E | | 1297729 | Upload Photo | Q26585285 |
| 5, London Road | II | 5, London Road | | | 1 November 1972 | TL5371638007; 52°01′09″N 0°14′19″E | | 1280230 | Upload Photo | Q26569390 |
| 7, London Road | II | 7, London Road | | | 1 November 1972 | TL5370838003; 52°01′09″N 0°14′19″E | | 1196212 | Upload Photo | Q26490750 |
| 24, 26 and 28, London Road | II | 24, 26 and 28, London Road | | | 31 October 1994 | TL5370938046; 52°01′10″N 0°14′19″E | | 1196213 | Upload Photo | Q26490751 |
| Old Saffron Walden Hospital | II | London Road | | | 2 April 1987 | TL5358737984; 52°01′08″N 0°14′13″E | | 1280236 | Upload Photo | Q26569394 |
| The Old Chapel | II | London Road | | | 1 November 1972 | TL5366937997; 52°01′09″N 0°14′17″E | | 1196214 | Upload Photo | Q26490752 |
| 1, 3A and 3B, Market Hill | II | 1, 3A and 3B, Market Hill | | | 1 November 1972 | TL5384238525; 52°01′26″N 0°14′27″E | | 1206455 | 1, 3A and 3B, Market Hill More images | Q26501671 |
| 2, Market Hill, 6 Market Place | II | 2, Market Hill, 6 Market Place | | | 28 November 1951 | TL5387338550; 52°01′27″N 0°14′29″E | | 1196220 | 2, Market Hill, 6 Market Place More images | Q26490756 |
| 4, Market Hill | II* | 4, Market Hill | | | 28 November 1951 | TL5384938559; 52°01′27″N 0°14′27″E | | 1206460 | 4, Market Hill More images | Q17534299 |
| 5 and 7, Market Hill | II | 5 and 7, Market Hill | | | 1 November 1972 | TL5383238554; 52°01′27″N 0°14′26″E | | 1297731 | Upload Photo | Q26585287 |
| 6, Market Hill | II | 6, Market Hill | | | 1 November 1972 | TL5384738567; 52°01′27″N 0°14′27″E | | 1206558 | 6, Market Hill More images | Q26501761 |
| Kings Arms Public House | II | 8 and 10, Market Hill | | | 1 November 1972 | TL5383738579; 52°01′27″N 0°14′27″E | | 1196215 | Kings Arms Public House More images | Q26490753 |
| 9 and 11, Market Hill | II | 9 and 11, Market Hill | | | 1 November 1972 | TL5382938558; 52°01′27″N 0°14′26″E | | 1280146 | 9 and 11, Market Hill More images | Q26569316 |
| 12 and 14, Market Hill | II* | 12 and 14, Market Hill | | | 28 November 1951 | TL5383038589; 52°01′28″N 0°14′26″E | | 1196216 | 12 and 14, Market Hill More images | Q17534141 |
| 13, Market Hill | II | 13, Market Hill | | | 1 November 1972 | TL5382238567; 52°01′27″N 0°14′26″E | | 1206592 | Upload Photo | Q26501796 |
| 15, Market Hill | II | 15, Market Hill | | | 1 November 1972 | TL5382038575; 52°01′27″N 0°14′26″E | | 1196217 | Upload Photo | Q26490754 |
| 17, Market Hill | I | 17, Market Hill | | | 28 November 1951 | TL5381838582; 52°01′28″N 0°14′26″E | | 1196218 | 17, Market Hill More images | Q17539614 |
| Town Hall | II | 3, Market Place | | | 1 November 1972 | TL5388638496; 52°01′25″N 0°14′29″E | | 1196219 | Town Hall More images | Q26490755 |
| Midland Bank | II | 10, Market Place | | | 28 November 1951 | TL5389638548; 52°01′26″N 0°14′30″E | | 1196222 | Midland Bank More images | Q26490758 |
| Barclays Bank | II* | Market Place | | | 1 November 1972 | TL5390238539; 52°01′26″N 0°14′30″E | | 1297732 | Barclays Bank More images | Q17534636 |
| Drinking Fountain | II | Market Place | | | 1 November 1972 | TL5387138525; 52°01′26″N 0°14′28″E | | 1196223 | Drinking Fountain More images | Q26490760 |
| Library, Former Corn Exchange | II | Market Place | | | 27 February 1969 | TL5384238515; 52°01′25″N 0°14′27″E | | 1297733 | Library, Former Corn Exchange More images | Q26585288 |
| Telephone Kiosk Outside Number 1 Market Hill | II | Market Place | | | 16 February 1988 | TL5384938524; 52°01′26″N 0°14′27″E | | 1196224 | Upload Photo | Q26490761 |
| 2, Market Row, 1 and 3 Cross Street | II | 2, Market Row, 1 and 3 Cross Street | | | 1 November 1972 | TL5385638437; 52°01′23″N 0°14′27″E | | 1297785 | Upload Photo | Q26585336 |
| 9, Market Row | II | 9, Market Row | | | 1 November 1972 | TL5385338466; 52°01′24″N 0°14′27″E | | 1196225 | Upload Photo | Q26490762 |
| 13, Market Row | II | 13, Market Row | | | 1 November 1972 | TL5387938476; 52°01′24″N 0°14′29″E | | 1206703 | Upload Photo | Q26501901 |
| 14 and 16, Market Row | II | 14 and 16, Market Row | | | 1 November 1972 | TL5389038465; 52°01′24″N 0°14′29″E | | 1297734 | 14 and 16, Market Row More images | Q26585289 |
| 1, Market Street | II | 1, Market Street | | | 1 November 1972 | TL5390538511; 52°01′25″N 0°14′30″E | | 1206713 | Upload Photo | Q26501910 |
| 2, Market Street | II | 2, Market Street | | | 1 November 1972 | TL5392038479; 52°01′24″N 0°14′31″E | | 1206719 | Upload Photo | Q26501916 |
| 3, Market Street | II | 3, Market Street | | | 1 November 1972 | TL5392138474; 52°01′24″N 0°14′31″E | | 1196226 | 3, Market Street More images | Q26490763 |
| White Horse Inn | II | 4, Market Street | | | 1 November 1972 | TL5389438464; 52°01′24″N 0°14′29″E | | 1298584 | Upload Photo | Q26586060 |
| 9, Market Walk | II | 9, Market Walk | | | 1 November 1972 | TL5383738442; 52°01′23″N 0°14′26″E | | 1206696 | Upload Photo | Q26501894 |
| 1, Mercers Row | II | 1, Mercers Row | | | 1 November 1972 | TL5382438464; 52°01′24″N 0°14′26″E | | 1297735 | Upload Photo | Q26585290 |
| 4, Mercers Row, 13 King Street | II | 4, Mercers Row, 13 King Street | | | 28 November 1951 | TL5382138476; 52°01′24″N 0°14′26″E | | 1206332 | Upload Photo | Q26501569 |
| 9 and 10, Mount Pleasant | II | 9 and 10, Mount Pleasant | | | 31 October 1994 | TL5399837781; 52°01′02″N 0°14′34″E | | 1196227 | Upload Photo | Q26490764 |
| 2, 4 and 6, Museum Street | II | 2, 4 and 6, Museum Street | | | 17 June 1982 | TL5375538672; 52°01′31″N 0°14′23″E | | 1298589 | 2, 4 and 6, Museum Street More images | Q26586064 |
| Conservative Club | II | 3 and 5, Museum Street | | | 28 November 1951 | TL5382038627; 52°01′29″N 0°14′26″E | | 1297736 | Conservative Club More images | Q26585291 |
| 7 and 9, Museum Street | II | 7 and 9, Museum Street | | | 1 November 1972 | TL5380038630; 52°01′29″N 0°14′25″E | | 1187683 | 7 and 9, Museum Street | Q26482868 |
| 8 and 10, Museum Street | II | 8 and 10, Museum Street | | | 1 November 1972 | TL5375438675; 52°01′31″N 0°14′22″E | | 1196228 | 8 and 10, Museum Street More images | Q26490765 |
| 11, 13 and 15, Museum Street | II* | 11, 13 and 15, Museum Street | | | 28 November 1951 | TL5377838683; 52°01′31″N 0°14′24″E | | 1298578 | 11, 13 and 15, Museum Street More images | Q17534704 |
| 17, Museum Street | II | 17, Museum Street | | | 31 October 1994 | TL5378338694; 52°01′31″N 0°14′24″E | | 1196229 | 17, Museum Street More images | Q26490766 |
| Saffron Walden Museum | II | Museum Street | | | 1 November 1972 | TL5383238719; 52°01′32″N 0°14′27″E | | 1025118 | Saffron Walden Museum More images | Q26275926 |
| Walden Castle | I | Museum Street | | | 28 November 1951 | TL5390738722; 52°01′32″N 0°14′31″E | Built by 1139. Dismantled by Henry II in 1158. Large Flint-rubble fragments of the keep walling remain. | 1297737 | Walden Castle More images | Q4185821 |
| 1 and 2, Museum Yard | II | 1 and 2, Museum Yard | | | 1 November 1972 | TL5378738689; 52°01′31″N 0°14′24″E | | 1025130 | Upload Photo | Q26276081 |
| Number 3 and Attached Wall | II | 3, Museum Yard | | | 1 November 1972 | TL5379138680; 52°01′31″N 0°14′24″E | | 1196230 | Number 3 and Attached Wall | Q26490767 |
| Youth Hostel | I | 1, Myddylton Place | | | 1 November 1972 | TL5357238618; 52°01′29″N 0°14′13″E | | 1297805 | Youth Hostel More images | Q17539925 |
| 5, Myddylton Place | II | 5, Myddylton Place | | | 28 November 1951 | TL5358038566; 52°01′27″N 0°14′13″E | | 1297738 | Upload Photo | Q26585292 |
| 6, Myddylton Place | II | 6, Myddylton Place | | | 1 November 1972 | TL5357538576; 52°01′28″N 0°14′13″E | | 1025098 | Upload Photo | Q26275904 |
| 7, Myddylton Place | II | 7, Myddylton Place | | | 1 November 1972 | TL5357938582; 52°01′28″N 0°14′13″E | | 1196231 | Upload Photo | Q26490768 |
| Garages to Myddylton House | II | Myddylton Place | | | 28 November 1951 | TL5356538590; 52°01′28″N 0°14′12″E | | 1025106 | Garages to Myddylton House More images | Q26275912 |
| Myddylton House | II | Myddylton Place | | | 28 November 1951 | TL5355738578; 52°01′28″N 0°14′12″E | | 1025102 | Myddylton House More images | Q26275909 |
| Walden Place | II | Myddylton Place | | | 28 November 1951 | TL5355038549; 52°01′27″N 0°14′12″E | | 1196232 | Upload Photo | Q26490769 |
| Wall on East Side of Garden of Walden Place | II | Myddylton Place | | | 31 October 1994 | TL5358838489; 52°01′25″N 0°14′13″E | | 1025113 | Upload Photo | Q26275920 |
| Tea House and Bridge | I | North West of Audley End House | | | 1 November 1972 | TL5229338534; 52°01′28″N 0°13′06″E | | 1297800 | Tea House and Bridge More images | Q63110048 |
| 1, Park Lane | II | 1, Park Lane | | | 1 November 1972 | TL5364238414; 52°01′22″N 0°14′16″E | | 1025087 | 1, Park Lane More images | Q26276327 |
| Summerhouse and Garden Wall to Number 1 | II | 1, Park Lane | | | 31 October 1994 | TL5364638387; 52°01′21″N 0°14′16″E | | 1196233 | Upload Photo | Q26490770 |
| Primes Close | II | 1, 1A and 9A, Park Lane | | | 1 November 1972 | TL5355338405; 52°01′22″N 0°14′12″E | | 1025095 | Primes Close More images | Q26275901 |
| 7, Park Lane | II | 7, Park Lane | | | 1 November 1972 | TL5353438405; 52°01′22″N 0°14′11″E | | 1025092 | 7, Park Lane More images | Q26276333 |
| 9 and 11, Park Lane | II | 9 and 11, Park Lane | | | 1 November 1972 | TL5352538405; 52°01′22″N 0°14′10″E | | 1297740 | 9 and 11, Park Lane More images | Q26585294 |
| 3 and 5, Radwinter Road | II | 3 and 5, Radwinter Road | | | 31 October 1994 | TL5443438490; 52°01′24″N 0°14′58″E | | 1196234 | Upload Photo | Q26490771 |
| Peace Lodge | II | 28, Radwinter Road | | | 31 October 1994 | TL5465638483; 52°01′24″N 0°15′09″E | | 1025063 | Upload Photo | Q26276304 |
| Cemetery Chapel | II | Radwinter Road | | | 31 October 1994 | TL5469338431; 52°01′22″N 0°15′11″E | | 1297741 | Upload Photo | Q26585295 |
| Cemetery Railings and Gates | II | Radwinter Road | | | 31 October 1994 | TL5460638494; 52°01′24″N 0°15′07″E | | 1025069 | Upload Photo | Q26276309 |
| Saffron Walden Community Hospital | II | Radwinter Road | | | 10 September 1982 | TL5500438614; 52°01′27″N 0°15′28″E | | 1196235 | Upload Photo | Q26490772 |
| The Cottage | II | Ravenstock Farm | | | 1 November 1972 | TL5510942374; 52°03′29″N 0°15′40″E | | 1196104 | Upload Photo | Q26490656 |
| Chest Tomb to Hannah Archer 2 Metres South West of Church | II | Saint Mary's Churchyard | | | 31 October 1994 | TL5372838600; 52°01′28″N 0°14′21″E | | 1196238 | Upload Photo | Q26490774 |
| Church of St Mary the Virgin | I | Saint Mary's Churchyard | | | 28 November 1951 | TL5373638626; 52°01′29″N 0°14′21″E | | 1196237 | Church of St Mary the Virgin More images | Q17539635 |
| Pair of Chest Tombs 37 Metres West of Tower and 13 Metres Fron North Churchyard Wall | II | Saint Mary's Churchyard | | | 31 October 1994 | TL5366838603; 52°01′28″N 0°14′18″E | | 1196240 | Pair of Chest Tombs 37 Metres West of Tower and 13 Metres Fron North Churchyard Wall More images | Q26490776 |
| Pair of Chest Tombs 5 Metres South West of Church | II | Saint Mary's Churchyard | | | 31 October 1994 | TL5372938597; 52°01′28″N 0°14′21″E | | 1196239 | Pair of Chest Tombs 5 Metres South West of Church More images | Q26490775 |
| Wall With Reset Tombstones on North Side of Churchyard | II | Saint Mary's Churchyard | | | 31 October 1994 | TL5366138610; 52°01′29″N 0°14′18″E | | 1196242 | Upload Photo | Q26490778 |
| Wall With Reset Tombstones on South Side of Churchyard | II | Saint Mary's Churchyard | | | 31 October 1994 | TL5369538563; 52°01′27″N 0°14′19″E | | 1196241 | Upload Photo | Q26490777 |
| Alpha Place | II | 1-16, Souh Road | | | 31 October 1994 | TL5407638131; 52°01′13″N 0°14′38″E | | 1196168 | Upload Photo | Q26490710 |
| Gas Works | II | Thaxted Road | | | 31 October 1994 | TL5440338384; 52°01′21″N 0°14′56″E | | 1196243 | Upload Photo | Q26490779 |
| 1-7, Village Street | II* | 1-7, Village Street | | | 28 November 1951 | TL5248537947; 52°01′08″N 0°13′15″E | | 1196244 | Upload Photo | Q17534151 |
| 9-15, Village Street | II | 9-15, Village Street | | | 28 November 1951 | TL5248737906; 52°01′07″N 0°13′15″E | | 1297744 | Upload Photo | Q26585298 |
| Boundary and Garden Wall to St Mark's College | II | Village Street | | | 28 November 1951 | TL5256237692; 52°01′00″N 0°13′18″E | | 1196247 | Upload Photo | Q26490780 |
| Saint Mark's College | I | Village Street | | | 28 November 1951 | TL5248337738; 52°01′02″N 0°13′14″E | | 1196246 | Upload Photo | Q17539653 |
| 2-28, Village Street, 2-22 Village Street | II* | 2-28, Village Street, 2-22 Village Street | | | 28 November 1951 | TL5246937942; 52°01′08″N 0°13′14″E | | 1196245 | 2-28, Village Street, 2-22 Village Street More images | Q17534162 |
| The Vineyard | II | Windmill Hill | | | 4 December 1990 | TL5316939247; 52°01′50″N 0°13′53″E | | 1196256 | Upload Photo | Q26490790 |
| Barn to North of Rowley Hill Farmhouse | II | | | | 1 November 1972 | TL5386040796; 52°02′39″N 0°14′31″E | | 1297797 | Upload Photo | Q26585347 |
| Barn to South of Hall Farmhouse | II | | | | 1 November 1972 | TL5456141460; 52°03′00″N 0°15′09″E | | 1297794 | Upload Photo | Q26585344 |
| Barn to South West of Hall Farmhouse | II | | | | 1 November 1972 | TL5453541466; 52°03′00″N 0°15′08″E | | 1196101 | Upload Photo | Q26490653 |
| Barn to West of Hall Farmhouse | II | | | | 1 November 1972 | TL5453641498; 52°03′01″N 0°15′08″E | | 1297795 | Upload Photo | Q26585345 |
| Barn to West of Rowley Hill Farmhouse | II | | | | 1 November 1972 | TL5382840778; 52°02′39″N 0°14′30″E | | 1204293 | Upload Photo | Q26499754 |
| Burntwood End | II* | | | | 1 November 1972 | TL5414242878; 52°03′46″N 0°14′50″E | | 1196099 | Upload Photo | Q17534003 |
| Cloptons | II | | | | 28 November 1951 | TL5579041497; 52°03′00″N 0°16′14″E | | 1297793 | Upload Photo | Q26585343 |
| Front Garden Wall to Hall Farmhouse | II | | | | 31 October 1994 | TL5459641503; 52°03′01″N 0°15′11″E | | 1196102 | Upload Photo | Q26490654 |
| Hall Farmhouse | II | | | | 1 November 1972 | TL5455541513; 52°03′02″N 0°15′09″E | | 1196100 | Upload Photo | Q26490652 |
| Harnser | II | | | | 31 October 1994 | TL5459641541; 52°03′03″N 0°15′11″E | | 1196103 | Upload Photo | Q26490655 |
| King Edward VI Almshouses, Central Block and Chapel | II | | | | 1 November 1972 | TL5353038358; 52°01′21″N 0°14′10″E | | 1196107 | King Edward VI Almshouses, Central Block and Chapel | Q26490659 |
| King Edward VI Almshouses, East Block | II | | | | 1 November 1972 | TL5357938345; 52°01′20″N 0°14′13″E | | 1281264 | King Edward VI Almshouses, East Block More images | Q26570326 |
| King Edward VI Almshouses, West Block | II | | | | 1 November 1972 | TL5349038324; 52°01′20″N 0°14′08″E | | 1196108 | King Edward VI Almshouses, West Block More images | Q26490660 |
| Mitchell's Farmhouse | II | | | | 1 November 1972 | TL5566842195; 52°03′23″N 0°16′09″E | | 1297796 | Upload Photo | Q26585346 |
| Norfolk House and Attached Wall to South Rear Garden Wall of Number 6 Rear Garden Wall of Number 7 | II | | | | 1 November 1972 | TL5359438594; 52°01′28″N 0°14′14″E | | 1297753 | Norfolk House and Attached Wall to South Rear Garden Wall of Number 6 Rear Garden Wall of Number 7 More images | Q26585306 |
| Ravenstock Farmhouse | II | | | | 1 November 1972 | TL5508642320; 52°03′27″N 0°15′38″E | | 1204280 | Upload Photo | Q26499742 |
| Rowley Hill Farmhouse | II | | | | 1 November 1972 | TL5386040798; 52°02′39″N 0°14′31″E | | 1281279 | Upload Photo | Q26570339 |
| Sadler's Farmhouse | II | | | | 1 November 1972 | TL5576441634; 52°03′04″N 0°16′13″E | | 1204300 | Upload Photo | Q26499761 |
| Stable to North West of Rowley Hill Farmhouse | II | | | | 31 October 1994 | TL5384640803; 52°02′39″N 0°14′31″E | | 1196105 | Upload Photo | Q26490657 |
| The Thatched Cottage | II | | | | 14 April 1982 | TL5539242020; 52°03′17″N 0°15′54″E | | 1196106 | Upload Photo | Q26490658 |

== See also ==
- Grade I listed buildings in Essex
- Grade II* listed buildings in Essex
- Listed buildings in Littlebury for part of Audley End Park and Gardens in Littlebury

== Sources ==
- Bettley, James; Pevsner, Nikolaus (2007) [1954], Essex, The Buildings of England, New Haven and London: Yale University Press, ISBN 978-0-300-11614-4
