= Corn Exchange, Saffron Walden =

Commercial building in Saffron Walden, Suffolk, England

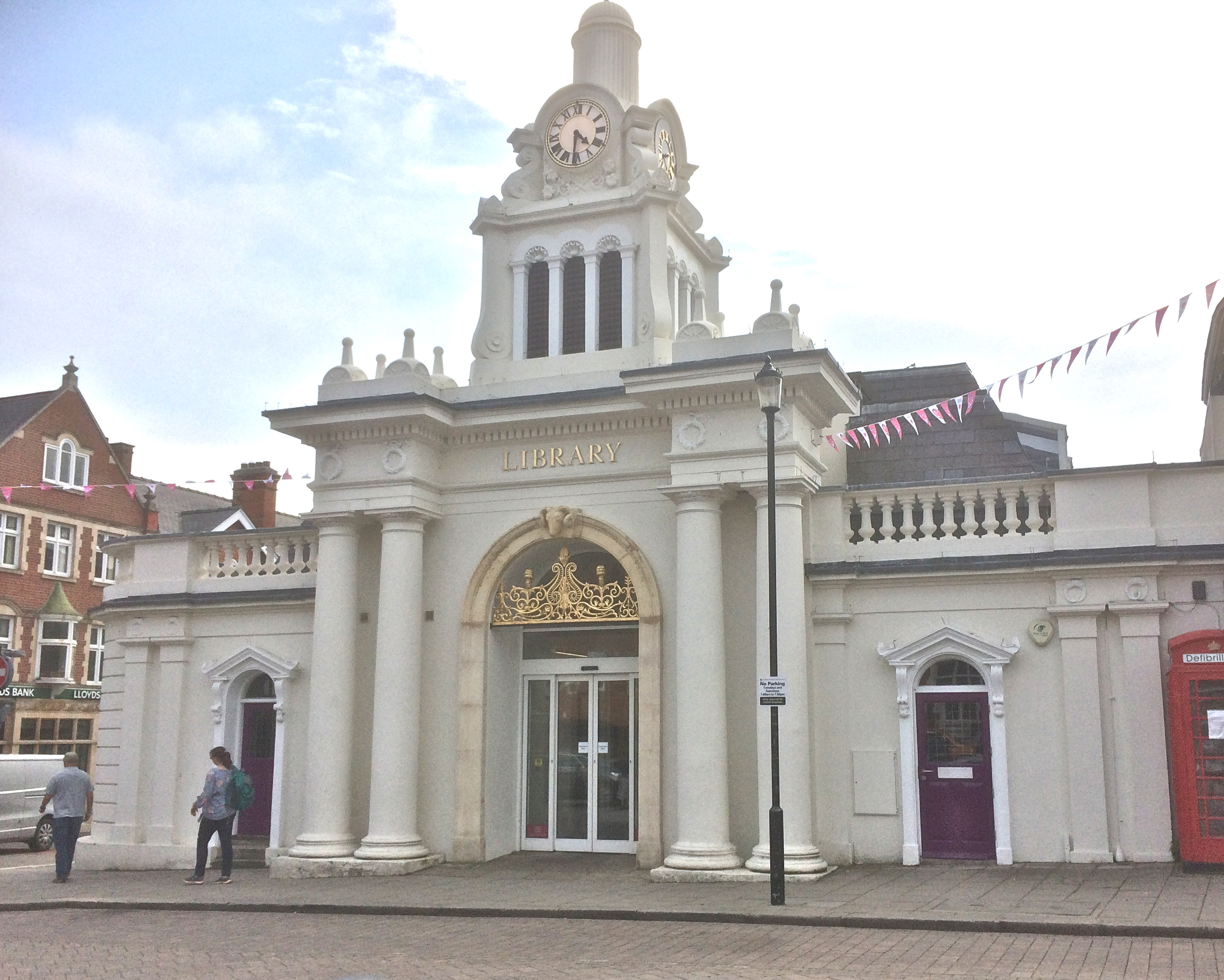
- Corn Exchange, Saffron Walden

- Shown in Essex
- 52.0237°N 0.2408°E
- Location: Market Place, Saffron Walden

History
- Built: 1849

Site notes
- Architect: Richard Tress
- Architectural style: Italianate style

Listed Building – Grade II
- Official name: Library, Former Corn Exchange
- Designated: 27 February 1969
- Reference no.: 1297733

The Corn Exchange is a commercial building in the Market Place in Saffron Walden, Essex, England. The structure, which is currently used as a library, is a Grade II listed building.

== History ==
In the mid-1840s, a group of local businessmen decided to form a private company, known as the "Saffron Walden Corn Exchange Company", to finance and commission a corn exchange for the town. The site they selected was occupied by a guildhall which had been used by the local wool-staplers.

The foundation stone for the new building was laid by Wyatt George Gibson. It was designed by Richard Tress in the Italianate style, built in brick with a stucco finish and was completed in February 1849. The design involved a near symmetrical main frontage of three bays facing onto the Market Square. The central bay featured an elaborate portico formed by a tall round headed opening with an architrave and a keystone, flanked by pairs of Doric order columns supporting an entablature, a modillioned cornice and a parapet. The entablature was decorated by paired wreathes and the parapet was surmounted by paired acroteria. The outer bays contained doorways with fanlights flanked by pilasters supporting open pediments. At roof level, there was a three-stage clock tower with three louvres and corner volutes in the first stage, a clock supported by consoles in the second stage and a cylinder in the third stage, all surmounted by a dome and a weather vane.

On either side of the main entrance were a committee room and a public reading room, beyond which was a central open area (25 ft (7.6 m) by 35 ft (11 m)) surrounded by a 'covered ambulatory' around which were sixteen corn merchants' offices. Immediately to the west a new post office was built, at the same time and in a complementary style, by William Beck (architect); it was set behind a colonnade above which was a large public room, which in 1853 became the Reading Room of the Saffron Walden Literary & Scientific Institution. (In 1876 the post office moved elsewhere, having outgrown its premises on the ground floor).

Use of the corn exchange declined significantly in the wake of the Great Depression of British Agriculture in the late 19th century, and it was acquired by Saffron Waldon Borough Council in 1882. The building was subsequently used as an events venue and the future Chancellor of the Exchequer, Hugh Dalton, spoke at the corn exchange in support of the Labour Party candidate, Jimmy Mallon during the 1918 general election. However, by the mid-1960s the building was in a very poor condition and "almost derelict".

Saffron Waldon Borough Council sought long-term tenants for the building in 1969. Essex County Council agreed to acquire the building in 1972 and commissioned an extensive programme of works to convert the building for use as a county library and arts centre: the building was officially re-opened for that purpose on 11 June 1975. The complex includes the former post office, which accommodates the "Gibson Library", a collection of 25,000 books assembled by the Saffron Walden Literary & Scientific Institution since it was founded in 1832.

== See also ==
- Corn exchanges in England
