= William Beck (architect) =

British architect

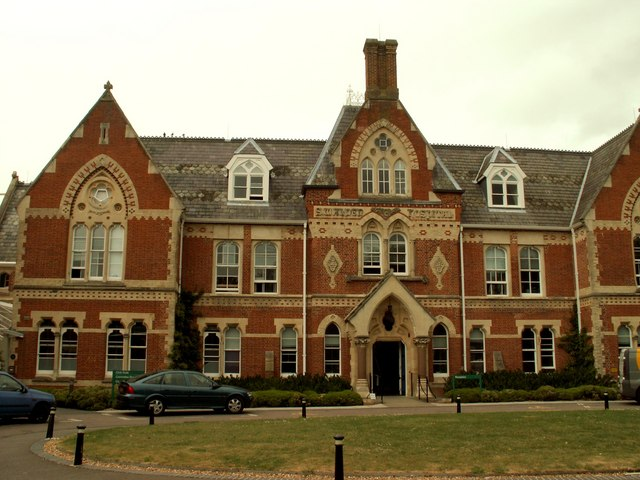
Saffron Walden General Hospital

William Beck was a British Quaker architect, based in London

On Wyatt George Gibson's death in 1862, he left £5,000 to build a hospital in Saffron Walden. It was built on London Road and the architect was Beck, and it opened in September 1866. His son George Stacey Gibson was elected treasurer. Saffron Walden General Hospital closed in 1988 and was converted into offices for Uttlesford District Council.

Beck designed the Metropolitan Association estate in Mile End New Town. In 1865, the Bedford Institute (rebuilt in 1894 to the designs of Rutland Saunders), Quaker Street, London, a school designed by Beck was opened.
