= Bridge End Gardens =

Gardens in Saffron Walden, Essex, England

Coordinates: 52.0270°N 0.2373°E

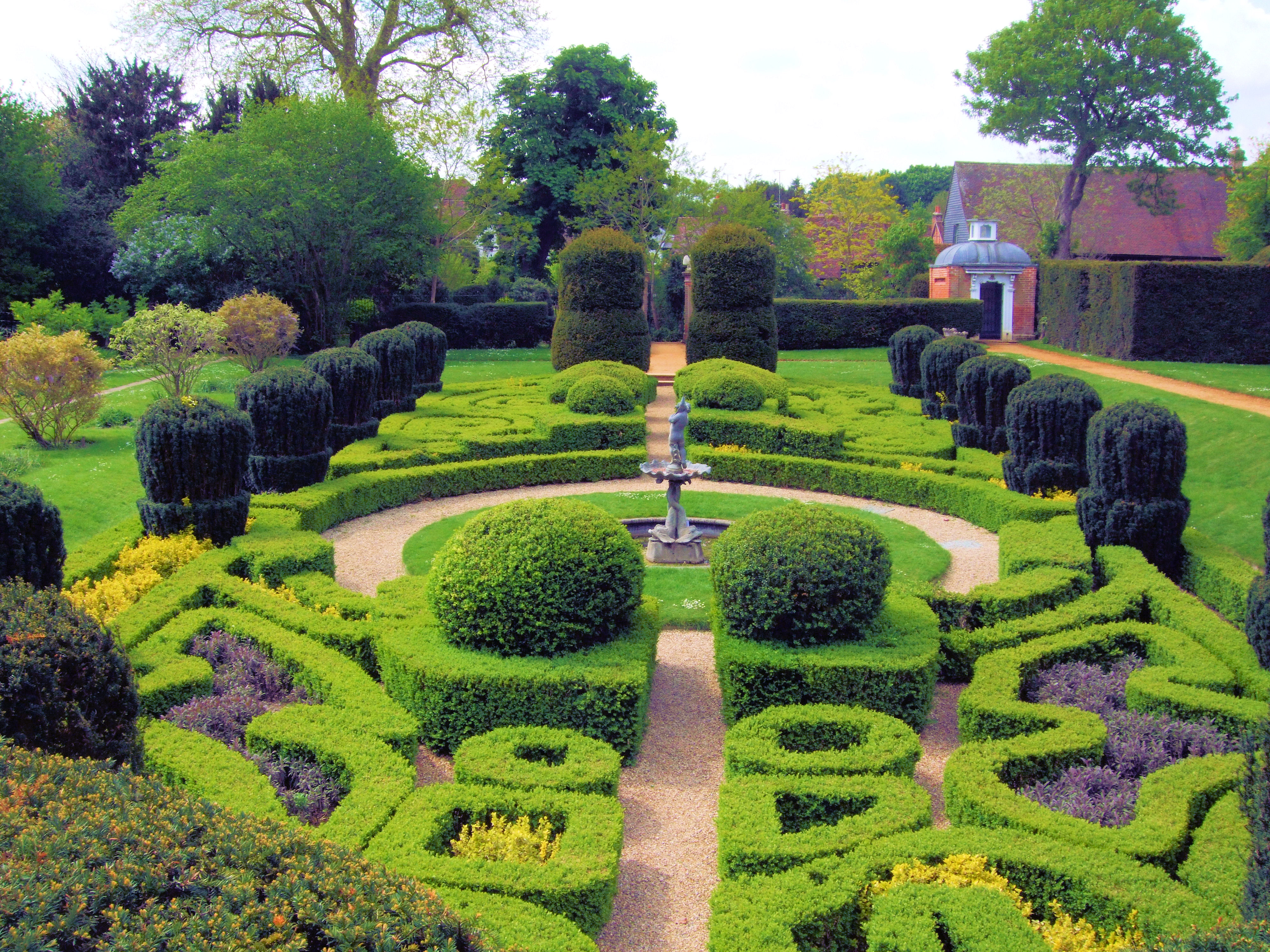
The Dutch Garden within Bridge End Gardens, a group of seven interlinked 19th-century gardens

Bridge End Gardens is a group of linked ornamental gardens in Saffron Walden, Essex, England. The gardens are listed Grade II* on the Register of Parks and Gardens. They are located off Castle Street, close to the Fry Art Gallery. Features include a maze.

== History and restoration ==
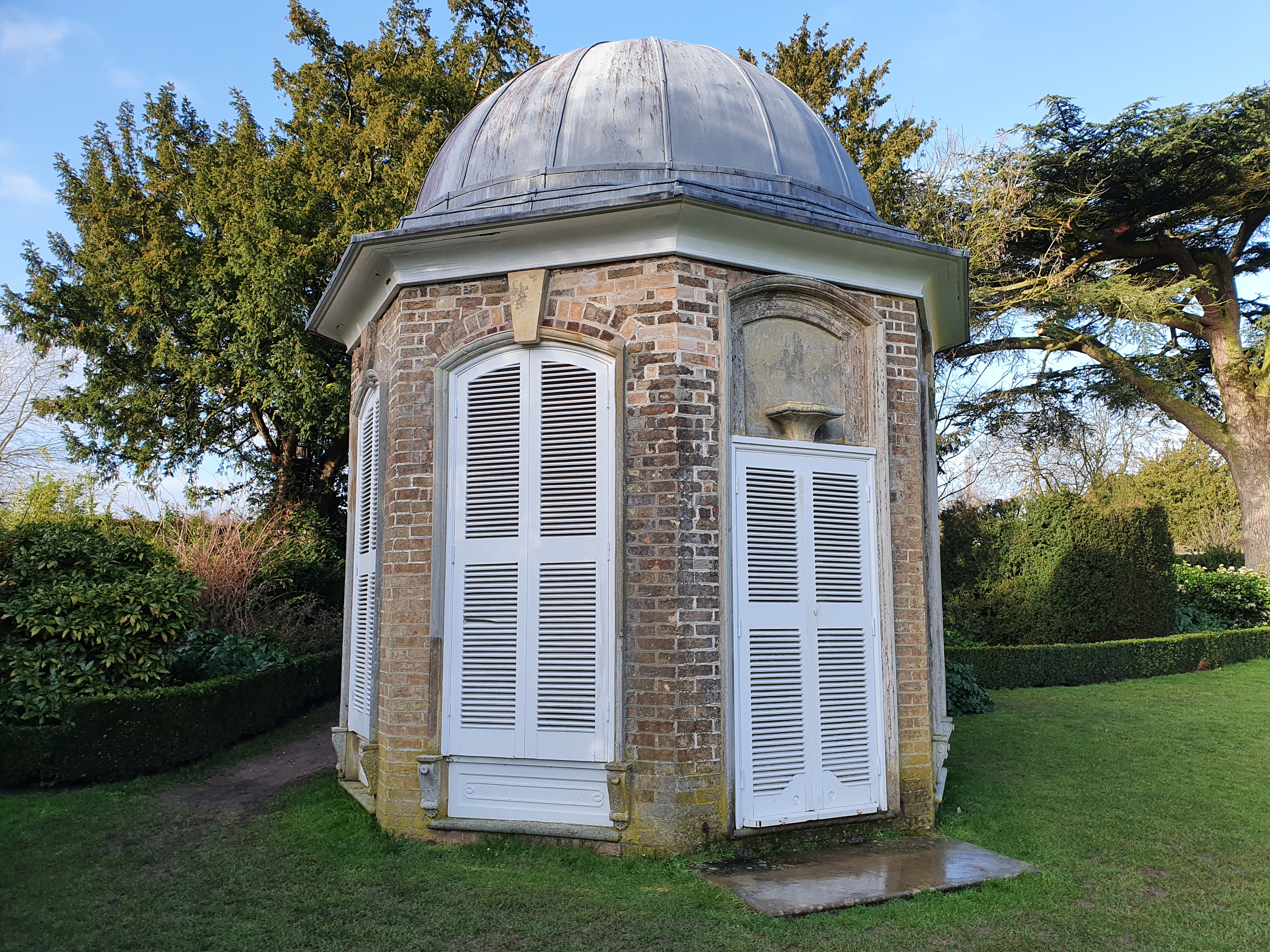
The Bridge End Gardens octagonal summerhouse

Bridge End Gardens were built part on fields and previous garden on the edge of Saffron Walden and covers an area of 2.7 hectares (7 acres). The area was set out as gardens from around 1828 by Atkinson Francis Gibson and his wife Elizabeth. From 1838, his son Francis Gibson – who, as a Quaker, was interested in horticulture and had also completed a garden design for his sister – began creating a new garden with the help of a local nurseryman William Chater (breeder of Chater Hollyhocks). Gibson considered the Dutch garden to be of utmost importance, and as such should be visible to visitors as they enter. The hedge maze (based upon the layout of the maze at Hampton Court Palace) was planted around 1870, and restored in 1984 with 11,000 yew seedlings, by which stage the garden was under the management of a local agent and was used as a venue for shows by the Saffron Walden horticultural society.

The site opened to the public in 1902 and the borough council took over responsibility for its management from 1918, designating it as a 'public pleasure ground'.

Plan of the Bridge End Gardens hedge maze

In 1987, the garden was listed with English Heritage. In the same year, the maze was replanted and the kitchen garden cleared. Between 2002 and 2006 the garden was restored back to the 1870 plan. The kitchen garden reopened between 2009 and 2011, and in 2015 introduced a visitors centre with toilets, designed to look like a converted toolshed. Most non-native plant additions would have been in the UK by the time of Francis Gibson's death in 1858.

=== Maze festival ===
Bridge End Gardens has participated in the Maze Festival, which marks the town of Saffron Walden's three mazes. There is an historic turf labyrinth maze on the common and another in the town's Jubilee Gardens. It also holds 'The 3 Maze Challenge', an event founded by William Stanley. The first maze festival took place in 2011.

=== Atkinson Francis Gibson ===
Gibson (20 November 1763 – 22 January 1829) was a British banker. From 1828, Gibson and his wife Elizabeth were responsible for laying out Bridge End Gardens.
