= Listed buildings in Littlebury =

Civil Parish in Essex, England

Littlebury is a village and civil parish within the Uttlesford District in Essex, England. It contains three grade I, one grade II* and 63 grade II listed buildings that are recorded in the National Heritage List for England.

This list is based on the information retrieved online from Historic England.

== Listing ==
Name	Grade	Location	Type	Completed (Note: The date given is the date used by Historic England as significant for the initial building or that of an important part in the structure's description.)	Date designated	Grid ref. (Note: The grid reference is based on the British national grid reference system, sometimes known as OSGB36, used by the Ordnance Survey.) Geo-coordinates	Notes	Entry number (Note: The "List Entry Number" is a unique number assigned to each listed building and scheduled monument by Historic England.)	Image	Wikidata
Home Farm	II	Audley End			1 November 1972	TL5237638693; 52°01′33″N 0°13′10″E		1297787	Upload Photo	Q26585338
Audley End Stables	I	Audley End Park			22 February 1980	TL5218838268; 52°01′19″N 0°13′00″E		1278179	Audley End Stables More images	Q17539889
Cambridge Lodge	II	Audley End Park			22 February 1980	TL5209338306; 52°01′20″N 0°12′55″E		1231274	Cambridge Lodge More images	Q26524882
Gates, Gate Piers and Railings to Cambridge Lodge	II	Audley End Park			22 February 1980	TL5208238291; 52°01′20″N 0°12′54″E		1278180	Upload Photo	Q26567529
Keepers Lodge	II	Audley End Park			22 February 1980	TL5114237985; 52°01′11″N 0°12′04″E		1231276	Upload Photo	Q26524883
London Lodge	II	Audley End Park			22 February 1980	TL5195237423; 52°00′52″N 0°12′46″E		1278181	London Lodge More images	Q26567530
Northend Lodge	II	Audley End Park			1 November 1972	TL5214239492; 52°01′59″N 0°12′59″E		1297801	Upload Photo	Q26585350
Ring Temple	II*	Audley End Park			21 February 1967	TL5155938323; 52°01′21″N 0°12′27″E		1231275	Ring Temple More images	Q17534382
Tea House and Bridge at TL 522 385, North West of Audley End House	I	Audley End Park			1 November 1972	TL5229338534; 52°01′28″N 0°13′06″E		1297800	Upload Photo	Q63110048
The Ring Cottage	II	Audley End Park			10 December 1987	TL5149838240; 52°01′19″N 0°12′24″E		1239512	Upload Photo	Q26532488
Numbers 1-4 Bakers Row	II	1-4, Bakers Row, Walden Road			22 February 1980	TL5172139662; 52°02′05″N 0°12′37″E		1231635	Upload Photo	Q26525212
John's Farmhouse	II	Cambridge Road			22 February 1980	TL5171939686; 52°02′05″N 0°12′37″E		1231277	Upload Photo	Q26524884
The Old Rectory	II	Cambridge Road			22 February 1980	TL5185539885; 52°02′12″N 0°12′45″E		1231278	Upload Photo	Q26524885
Wheelwrights Cottage	II	Cambridge Road			22 February 1980	TL5171439720; 52°02′06″N 0°12′37″E		1278182	Upload Photo	Q26567531
Graves Farmhouse	II	Catmere End			22 February 1980	TL4924439430; 52°02′00″N 0°10′27″E		1231279	Upload Photo	Q26524886
Nunns Farmhouse	II	Catmere End			22 February 1980	TL4910239439; 52°02′00″N 0°10′20″E		1231280	Upload Photo	Q26524887
The Cottage	II	Catmere End			22 February 1980	TL4896539484; 52°02′02″N 0°10′13″E		1231282	Upload Photo	Q26524889
The Thatch	II	Catmere End			22 February 1980	TL4897939476; 52°02′01″N 0°10′13″E		1231281	Upload Photo	Q26524888
Flint Cottage	II	Church Walk			22 February 1980	TL5173339524; 52°02′00″N 0°12′38″E		1231284	Upload Photo	Q26524891
Barn to North West of Parrishes	II	High Street			22 February 1980	TL5164839698; 52°02′06″N 0°12′34″E		1278171	Upload Photo	Q26567521
Barton House	II	High Street			21 February 1967	TL5163139608; 52°02′03″N 0°12′33″E		1231342	Upload Photo	Q26524943
Beech Cottage	II	High Street			21 February 1967	TL5160439593; 52°02′02″N 0°12′31″E		1277468	Upload Photo	Q26566883
Cedar Lodge	II	High Street			21 February 1967	TL5161939563; 52°02′01″N 0°12′32″E		1231351	Upload Photo	Q26524950
Church of the Holy Trinity	I	High Street			21 February 1967	TL5169439486; 52°01′59″N 0°12′36″E		1231285	Church of the Holy Trinity More images	Q17539718
Elizabethan Cottage	II	High Street			22 February 1980	TL5164739629; 52°02′04″N 0°12′34″E		1278173	Upload Photo	Q26567523
Flint Cottage	II	High Street			22 February 1980	TL5170339657; 52°02′04″N 0°12′37″E		1231345	Upload Photo	Q26680332
Granta House	II	High Street			22 February 1980	TL5164339474; 52°01′59″N 0°12′33″E		1231346	Upload Photo	Q26524947
Jasmine Cottage	II	High Street			22 February 1980	TL5163439618; 52°02′03″N 0°12′33″E		1231343	Upload Photo	Q26524944
K6 Telephone Kiosk	II	High Street			28 November 1989	TL5162039626; 52°02′04″N 0°12′32″E		1239698	Upload Photo	Q26532660
Kent's Farmhouse	II	High Street			21 February 1967	TL5159939626; 52°02′04″N 0°12′31″E		1231286	Upload Photo	Q26524892
Mellows	II	High Street			21 February 1967	TL5161039584; 52°02′02″N 0°12′32″E		1231623	Upload Photo	Q26525200
Mill Cottage	II	High Street			22 February 1980	TL5161639549; 52°02′01″N 0°12′32″E		1231621	Upload Photo	Q26525198
Old Telegraph House	II	High Street			22 February 1980	TL5168439647; 52°02′04″N 0°12′36″E		1278174	Upload Photo	Q26567524
Old Vicarage	II	High Street			21 February 1967	TL5166639532; 52°02′00″N 0°12′34″E		1278162	Upload Photo	Q26567512
Parrishes	II	High Street			21 February 1967	TL5166739661; 52°02′05″N 0°12′35″E		1231333	Upload Photo	Q26524934
Queens Head Inn	II	High Street			21 February 1967	TL5163139600; 52°02′03″N 0°12′33″E		1278172	Queens Head Inn More images	Q26567522
Range of Flint and Brick Outbuildings to the South West of Granta House	II	High Street			22 February 1980	TL5162239440; 52°01′58″N 0°12′32″E		1231349	Upload Photo	Q26524949
The Gatehouse	II	High Street			26 November 1951	TL5157139597; 52°02′03″N 0°12′30″E		1231624	Upload Photo	Q26525201
The Old Post Office	II	High Street			22 February 1980	TL5171539660; 52°02′05″N 0°12′37″E		1231616	Upload Photo	Q26525194
Tudor House	II	High Street			21 February 1967	TL5161739571; 52°02′02″N 0°12′32″E		1277467	Upload Photo	Q26566882
Two Cottages Immediately to East of Elizabethan Cottage	II	High Street			22 February 1980	TL5165639633; 52°02′04″N 0°12′34″E		1231344	Upload Photo	Q26524945
Flint Cottage	II	Mill Lane			22 February 1980	TL5183139623; 52°02′03″N 0°12′43″E		1277470	Upload Photo	Q26892668
Mill Adjoining Mill House on the East	II	Mill Lane			21 February 1967	TL5184939563; 52°02′01″N 0°12′44″E		1231630	Upload Photo	Q26525207
Mill Cottage	II	Mill Lane			22 February 1980	TL5184539618; 52°02′03″N 0°12′44″E		1277471	Upload Photo	Q26683254
Mill House	II	Mill Lane			21 February 1967	TL5183439567; 52°02′01″N 0°12′43″E		1231628	Upload Photo	Q26525205
River Cottage	II	Mill Lane			22 February 1980	TL5185739615; 52°02′03″N 0°12′45″E		1231627	Upload Photo	Q26525204
Number 3 and Folly Cottage	II	3, Walden Road			22 February 1980	TL5181439670; 52°02′05″N 0°12′42″E		1278261	Upload Photo	Q26567603
22-28, Walden Road	II	22-28, Walden Road			22 February 1980	TL5182439651; 52°02′04″N 0°12′43″E		1277473	Upload Photo	Q26566887
6-12, Walden Road	II	6-12, Walden Road			22 February 1980	TL5176839661; 52°02′05″N 0°12′40″E		1231636	Upload Photo	Q26525213
Midsummer House	II	Walden Road			21 February 1967	TL5184239675; 52°02′05″N 0°12′44″E		1231632	Upload Photo	Q26525209
Mulberry Cottage	II	Walden Road			22 February 1980	TL5179039630; 52°02′04″N 0°12′41″E		1231753	Upload Photo	Q26525317
Old Carpenters Arms	II	Walden Road			22 February 1980	TL5181339656; 52°02′04″N 0°12′42″E		1231637	Upload Photo	Q26525214
Pantiles	II	Walden Road			22 February 1980	TL5183339643; 52°02′04″N 0°12′43″E		1231638	Upload Photo	Q26525215
Ring Hill Cottage and Number 2	II	Walden Road			22 February 1980	TL5175239665; 52°02′05″N 0°12′39″E		1278266	Upload Photo	Q26567608
Riverside Cottage	II	Walden Road			22 February 1980	TL5185239631; 52°02′03″N 0°12′44″E		1231780	Upload Photo	Q26525344
St John's Cottage	II	Walden Road			22 February 1980	TL5177839676; 52°02′05″N 0°12′40″E		1278264	Upload Photo	Q26567606
Thatched Cottage	II	Walden Road			22 February 1980	TL5175939684; 52°02′05″N 0°12′40″E		1231633	Upload Photo	Q26525210
The Old Bakery	II	Walden Road			22 February 1980	TL5178439663; 52°02′05″N 0°12′41″E		1277472	Upload Photo	Q26566886
Audley End Tunnel, South Portal	II				25 April 1986	TL5132538225; 52°01′19″N 0°12′14″E		1239472	Upload Photo	Q26532448
Boundary Walls to South of Granta House Boundary Walls to South, West and North (Approximately 50 Metres in Length From West Wall) to Granta House. Wall Extending North From About Centre of South Wall (Approximately 20 Metres) Joining An L-shaped Wall Linking Two Outbuildings	II				22 February 1980	TL5162639410; 52°01′57″N 0°12′32″E		1231347	Upload Photo	Q66477463
Bury Cottage the Hoops Former Public House	II				17 June 1982	TL4872538388; 52°01′26″N 0°09′58″E		1239236	Upload Photo	Q26532234
Caitlin's Farmhouse	II				22 February 1980	TL4903538575; 52°01′32″N 0°10′15″E		1231625	Upload Photo	Q26525202
Dovecote at Howe Hall	II				21 February 1967	TL4931538697; 52°01′36″N 0°10′30″E		1231698	Upload Photo	Q26525267
Green Farmhouse and Adjoining Barn	II				22 February 1980	TL4872838389; 52°01′26″N 0°09′59″E		1231626	Upload Photo	Q26525203
Howe Hall	II				17 June 1982	TL4935138695; 52°01′36″N 0°10′32″E		1273819	Upload Photo	Q26563531
Keepers Cottage	II				23 November 1984	TL4932139364; 52°01′57″N 0°10′31″E		1239354	Upload Photo	Q26532333
Littlebury Tunnel, South Portal	II				25 April 1986	TL5128638978; 52°01′43″N 0°12′14″E		1239473	Upload Photo	Q26532449

== See also ==
- Grade I listed buildings in Essex
- Grade II* listed buildings in Essex
- Listed buildings in Saffron Walden for Audley End House

== Sources ==
- Bettley, James; Pevsner, Nikolaus (2007) [1954], Essex, The Buildings of England, New Haven and London: Yale University Press, ISBN 978-0-300-11614-4
