= Wyatt George Gibson =

British banker

Wyatt George Gibson (28 July 1790 – 1862) was a British banker.

== Early life ==
He was born on 28 July 1790, the son of Atkinson Francis Gibson and Elizabeth Wyatt.

== Career ==
He ran the Saffron Walden and North Essex Bank, which in 1906 became part of Barclays Bank.

== Personal life ==
On 25 Sept 1817, he married Deborah Stacey, daughter of George Stacey and Mary, in Tottenham, London.

Their son George Stacey Gibson (1818–1883), was a banker, botanist and philanthropist.

== Legacy ==
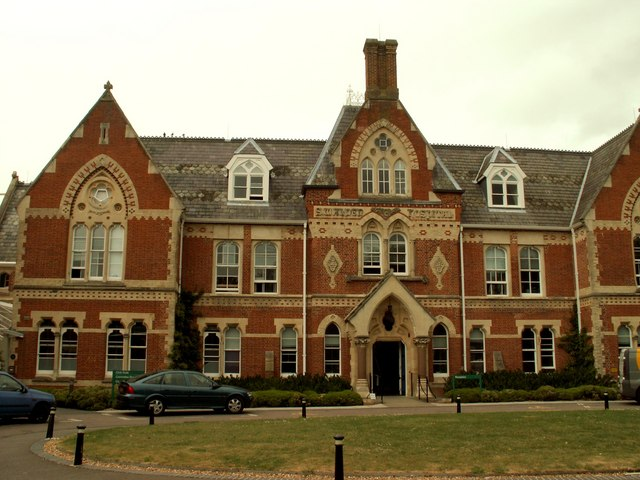
Saffron Walden General Hospital

On his death in 1862, he left £5,000 to build a hospital in Saffron Walden. It was built on London Road and the architect was William Beck, and it opened in September 1866. His son George Stacey Gibson was elected treasurer. Saffron Walden General Hospital closed in 1988 and was converted into offices for Uttlesford District Council.
