= Hill House, Saffron Walden =

19th-century building in Saffron Walden, Essex, England

Coordinates: 52°01′15″N 0°14′22″E

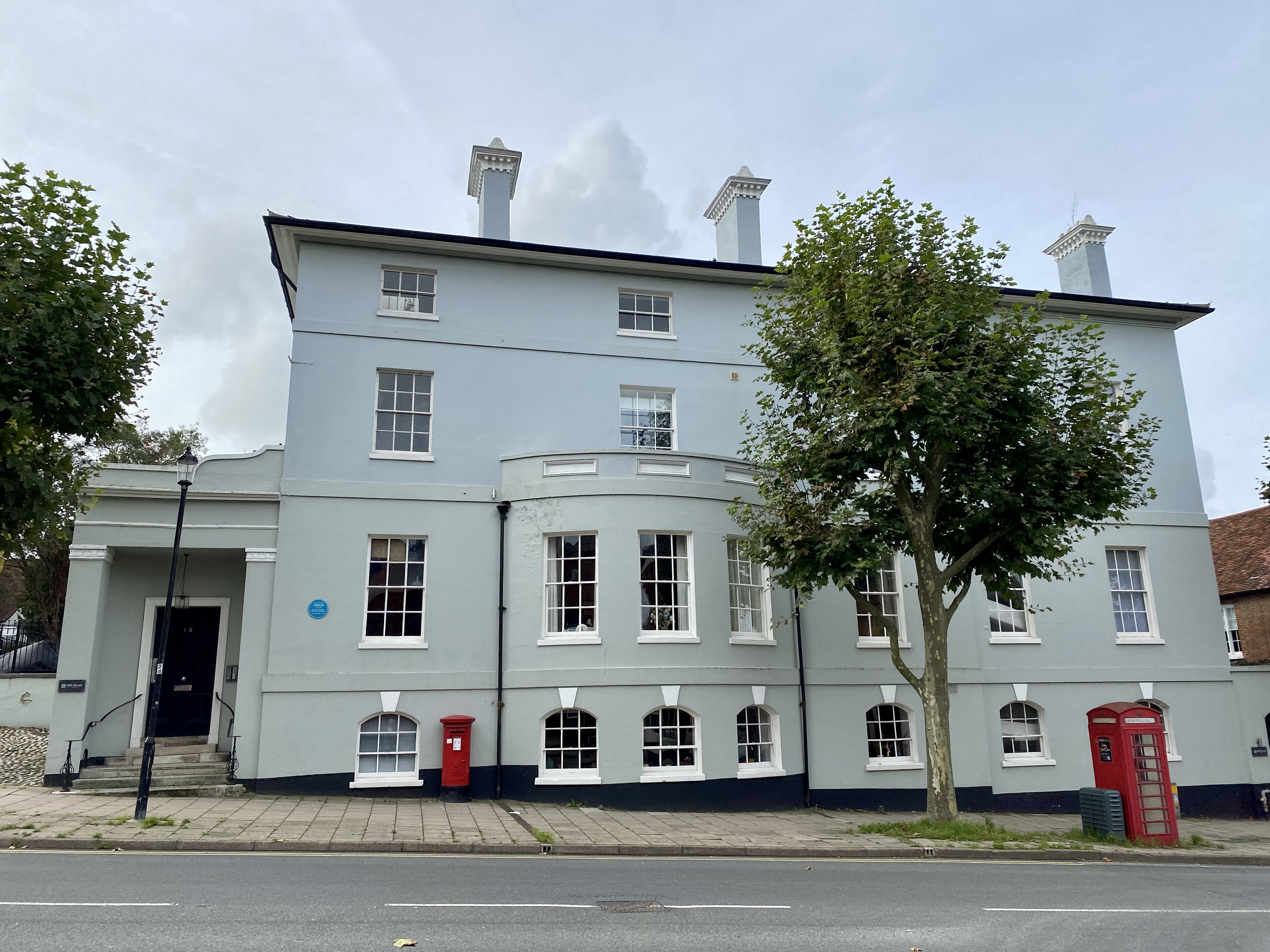
Hill House in October 2023.

Hill House is a 19th-century building at 75 High Street, Saffron Walden, Essex, England. It is listed Grade II.

In 1845, George Stacey Gibson (1818–1883) and his wife Elizabeth, the daughter of Samuel Tuke, bought Hill House and lived there until their death. Gibson was a British banker, botanist and philanthropist.

Their only child, Mary Wyatt Gibson (1855–1934) lived at Hill House until her death. After her death, most of the grounds of Hill House were developed for housing, and the family name lives on in Gibson Gardens, Gibson Way and Gibson Close.

The building was listed in 1972 and is now divided into 17 flats.
