= George Stacey Gibson =

George Stacey Gibson FLS (20 July 1818 – 11 April 1883), was a British banker, botanist and philanthropist.

== Early life ==
George Stacey Gibson was born in Saffron Walden, Essex on 20 July 1818, the only child of Wyatt George Gibson (1790–1862) and Deborah, daughter of George Stacey of Alton, Hampshire. He was a nephew of Jabez Gibson.

== Career ==
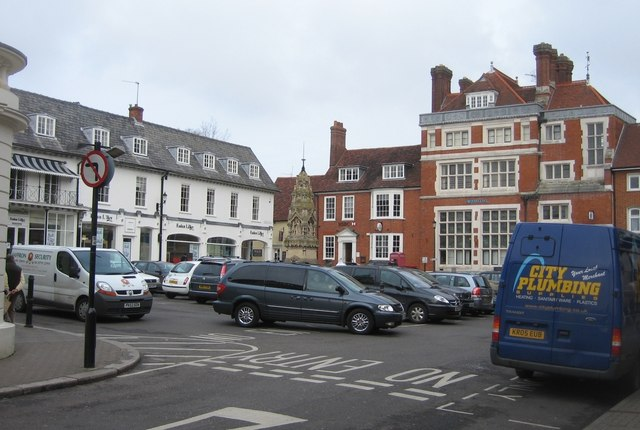
Barclays Bank, Saffron Walden

The Gibson family of Saffron Walden owned a brewery, an extensive chain of public houses, a bank and a number of substantial residential properties in the town.

As a botanist, Gibson discovered various plants, was made a Fellow of the Linnean Society in 1847, and published Flora of Essex.

However, after the death of his father had to focus on running the Saffron Walden and North Essex Bank, of which he was the sole proprietor. In 1874, he had William Eden Nesfield build a new bank on the east side of the Market Place. It is now a branch of Barclays Bank and Grade II* listed.

== Personal life ==
On 16 July 1845, he married Elizabeth Tuke, the daughter of Samuel and Priscilla Tuke, and brother of William Murray Tuke. In 1845, and they moved to Hill House, 75 High Street, Saffron Walden.

Their only child, Mary Wyatt Gibson was born in Saffron Walden on 19 April 1855. She had had learning difficulties, and lived at Hill House until her death in 1934. After her death, most of the grounds of Hill House were developed for housing, and the family name lives on in Gibson Gardens, Gibson Way and Gibson Close.
