= Listed buildings in Wendens Ambo =

Civil Parish in Essex, England

Wendens Ambo is a village and civil parish within the Uttlesford District in Essex, England. It contains one grade I and 29 grade II listed buildings that are recorded in the National Heritage List for England.

This list is based on the information retrieved online from Historic England.

== Listing ==
Name	Grade	Location	Type	Completed (Note: The date given is the date used by Historic England as significant for the initial building or that of an important part in the structure's description.)	Date designated	Grid ref. (Note: The grid reference is based on the British national grid reference system, sometimes known as OSGB36, used by the Ordnance Survey.) Geo-coordinates	Notes	Entry number (Note: The "List Entry Number" is a unique number assigned to each listed building and scheduled monument by Historic England.)	Image	Wikidata
1, Church Path	II	Church Path			21 February 1967	TL5126236393; 52°00′19″N 0°12′08″E		1238158	Upload Photo	Q26531233
2, Church Path	II	Church Path			21 February 1967	TL5125236393; 52°00′19″N 0°12′08″E		1274244	Upload Photo	Q26563923
3, Church Path	II	Church Path			21 February 1967	TL5123536393; 52°00′19″N 0°12′07″E		1238159	Upload Photo	Q26531234
Church of St Mary the Virgin	I	Church Path			21 February 1967	TL5129236390; 52°00′19″N 0°12′10″E	Norman west tower with Hertfordshire spike, west doorway with Roman bricks. Octagonal font, c. 1400. Late 15th century pulpit. Remains of wall paintings of the life of St. Margaret, c. 1330.	1238157	Church of St Mary the Virgin More images	Q17539758
Beam End	II	Duck Street			17 June 1982	TL5106436033; 52°00′08″N 0°11′57″E		1239240	Upload Photo	Q26532238
Cottage 80 Yards North East of Willows	II	Duck Street			22 February 1980	TL5111236138; 52°00′11″N 0°12′00″E		1238161	Upload Photo	Q26531236
House and Cottage South of Springfield	II	Duck Street			12 November 1981	TL5113636126; 52°00′11″N 0°12′01″E		1239229	Upload Photo	Q26532227
K6 Telephone Kiosk	II	Duck Street			24 August 1993	TL5118336348; 52°00′18″N 0°12′04″E		1239842	Upload Photo	Q26532789
Old Rectory Cottages	II	Duck Street			22 February 1980	TL5103436098; 52°00′10″N 0°11′56″E		1238295	Upload Photo	Q26531361
Trout Hall	II	Duck Street			22 February 1980	TL5116536309; 52°00′17″N 0°12′03″E		1238289	Upload Photo	Q26531355
Old Mill House	II	Mill Lane			22 February 1980	TL5202636431; 52°00′20″N 0°12′48″E		1274301	Upload Photo	Q26563978
Fighting Cocks Public House	II	Mutlow Hill			22 February 1980	TL5188936536; 52°00′23″N 0°12′41″E		1238298	Fighting Cocks Public House More images	Q26531364
The Old Forge	II	Mutlow Hill			22 February 1980	TL5194036238; 52°00′14″N 0°12′43″E		1238163	Upload Photo	Q26531238
Numbers 1-9 Railway Cottages	II	1-9, Railway Cottages			22 February 1980	TL5161036477; 52°00′22″N 0°12′27″E		1238181	Numbers 1-9 Railway Cottages More images	Q26531256
Rookery Cottage	II	Rookery Lane			21 February 1967	TL5130935872; 52°00′02″N 0°12′10″E		1238169	Upload Photo	Q26531245
Barn at Wenden Place	II	Roysden Road			1 February 1988	TL5113736396; 52°00′20″N 0°12′02″E		1239594	Upload Photo	Q26532563
Barn at Westbury	II	Roysden Road			18 April 1988	TL5087336389; 52°00′20″N 0°11′48″E		1239595	Upload Photo	Q26532564
Bell Inn	II	Roysden Road			26 November 1951	TL5112336365; 52°00′19″N 0°12′01″E		1238309	Bell Inn More images	Q26531374
Boundary Wall Extending East From Wenden Place to the Old Post Office	II	Roysden Road			10 September 1970	TL5120036371; 52°00′19″N 0°12′05″E		1238174	Upload Photo	Q26531249
Oak Cottage	II	Roysden Road			22 February 1980	TL5054136258; 52°00′16″N 0°11′30″E		1238311	Upload Photo	Q26531376
Old Post Office	II	Roysden Road			10 September 1970	TL5120636396; 52°00′19″N 0°12′05″E		1238173	Upload Photo	Q26531248
Stables at Wendon Place	II	Roysden Road			1 February 1988	TL5115636406; 52°00′20″N 0°12′03″E		1273633	Upload Photo	Q26563355
The Close	II	Roysden Road			24 October 1979	TL5132636498; 52°00′23″N 0°12′12″E		1274252	Upload Photo	Q26563931
Wenden Place	II	Roysden Road			10 September 1970	TL5117236366; 52°00′19″N 0°12′03″E		1274256	Upload Photo	Q26563935
Wenden Place Cottage	II	Roysden Road			10 September 1970	TL5114836371; 52°00′19″N 0°12′02″E		1238177	Upload Photo	Q26531252
Numbers 1-7 Silver Row	II	1-7, Silver Row			22 February 1980	TL5197236271; 52°00′15″N 0°12′45″E		1238162	Upload Photo	Q26531237
Barn at Wenden Hall Farm Approximately 70 Metres North of Wenden Hall	II				22 February 1980	TL5129736355; 52°00′18″N 0°12′10″E		1238156	Upload Photo	Q26531232
K6 Telephone Kiosk Outside Audley End Station	II				22 February 1988	TL5161436315; 52°00′16″N 0°12′27″E		1239656	K6 Telephone Kiosk Outside Audley End Station More images	Q26532621
Main Building on East Side of Track St Audley End Railway Station	II				1 September 1971	TL5161036304; 52°00′16″N 0°12′26″E		1238269	Main Building on East Side of Track St Audley End Railway Station More images	Q2574881
Wenden Hall	II				26 November 1951	TL5129836275; 52°00′15″N 0°12′10″E		1238154	Upload Photo	Q26531230

== See also ==
- Grade I listed buildings in Essex
- Grade II* listed buildings in Essex

== Sources ==
- Bettley, James; Pevsner, Nikolaus (2007) [1954], Essex, The Buildings of England, New Haven and London: Yale University Press, ISBN 978-0-300-11614-4
