= Walter de Clare =

12th-century Anglo-Norman baron in England

- Died: c. 1138
- Other name: Walter fitzRichard
- Occupation: Baron
- Years active: 1119–1136
- Known for: founding Tintern Abbey
- Parent(s): Richard de Clare; Rohese

Walter de Clare or Walter fitzRichard (Note: Other versions of his name include Walter fitz Richard of Clare and Walter fitz Richard de Clare.) (died probably 1137 or 1138) was an Anglo-Norman nobleman and founder of Tintern Abbey. A member of a powerful family, Walter was a younger son who was given the Lordship of Striguil together with lands around Chepstow Castle by King Henry I of England sometime before 1119. Walter continued to appear in Henry's charters for the rest of the reign, and was an early supporter of King Stephen of England, Henry's successor as king. Walter last appears in the historical record in 1136 and died without children. His lands went to his nephew.

== Family and background ==
Walter was a younger son of Richard de Clare, a Norman lord and landholder who also held Clare and Tonbridge in England. Walter's mother was Rohese, the daughter of Walter Giffard. Rohese and Richard had at least six sons and two daughters. Besides Walter, they were Roger, Gilbert, Richard, Robert, and Godfrey. The daughters were Alice and Rohese. Walter's family of de Clare was a powerful one, with members of it having participated in rebellions and conspiracies against Henry's older brother King William II of England (d. 1100) in 1088 and 1095.

== Life ==
Little is known of Walter's life, most of it deriving from the Gesta Normannorum Ducum written by William of Jumieges. The first mention of Walter in the historical record is when he was granted the lordship of Netherwent, including Chepstow Castle beside the River Wye, by King Henry I of England. This occurred sometime before 1119. Walter's lordship of Netherwent or Chepstow was generally considered a feudal barony, and Walter is considered a baron by most historians. (Note: These lands had previously been held by Roger de Breteuil, who rebelled in 1075 and had his lands confiscated by the king.) Walter's land grant was part of a larger series of grants by Henry in southern Wales, including some given to Walter's brother Gilbert de Clare. Henry also granted lands to another brother of Gilbert and Walter: Robert, who received Little Dunmow. These grants from the king to the Clare family helped bring them over to the royal side during the conflict between the king and his nephew William Clito over the control of Normandy in the late 1110s.

Walter was a witness on 12 of Henry's royal charters, all before 1131. He was also a witness for some royal charters issued by Henry's successor, King Stephen of England, early in Stephen's reign. One was a charter issued at Henry's funeral on 4 January 1136 and another at Stephen's court at Easter 1136. These two charter attestations show that he was an early supporter of Stephen in the king's seizure of the throne from Henry's daughter Matilda. These early charters from Stephen's reign are Walter's last appearances in documents during his lifetime. Also in 1136 Walter was in charge of the defense of Le Sap in Normandy against Geoffrey V of Anjou.

Walter established Tintern Abbey as a Cistercian monastery on 9 May 1131, the second Cistercian monastic house to be endowed in Britain. (Note: The first was Waverley Abbey, which was founded in 1128.) The monks for the establishment came from L'Aumône Abbey in France. Although the ruins of Tintern were the subject of a poem by William Wordsworth (Note: The poem has the full title of "Lines written a few miles above Tintern Abbey", although it is often shortened to "Tintern Abbey" and was published in 1798.) and a painting by J. M. W. Turner, these ruins are not Walter's original buildings, as little remains of them.

== Death and legacy ==
Historians differ over whether Walter ever married, but agree that he died childless. Michael Altschul lists no wife in his work on the Clares, and C. Warren Hollister, revising J. Horace Round's entry in the Dictionary of National Biography for the Oxford Dictionary of National Biography, states that it is unclear if Walter married. Jennifer Ward, however, states that Walter married Isabella, a daughter of Ralph de Tosny. Katharine Keats-Rohan states that Walter married Isabel, a daughter of Ralph de Tosny, and states that his widow gave an endowment to the cathedral chapter of Salisbury Cathedral for the sake of Walter's soul. Walter was alive at Easter in 1136, (Note: Easter in 1136 occurred on 22 March.) but died after that date. The obituary for Walter from Tintern gives his death date as 10 March, but does not state a year. A date of 1138 is usually given for his death; though this has not been proven, it is likely. His estates passed to his nephew Gilbert de Clare, son of his brother Gilbert, who had died around 1115.
