= Battle of Lincoln (1217) =

Battle during the First Barons' War

- Part of the First Barons' War
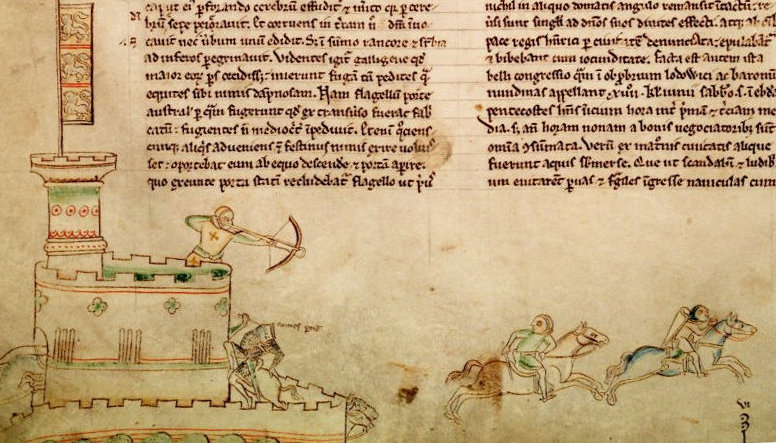
- An illustration by Matthew Paris accompanying an account of the battle
| Date | 20 May 1217 |
| Location | Lincoln Castle, England 53°14′00″N 0°32′19″W |
| Result | English victory |

Belligerents
| Kingdom of England | Kingdom of France; Army of God and the Holy Church |

Commanders and leaders
| William Marshal; William Longespée; Ranulf de Blondeville; Peter des Roches; William de Ferrers | Thomas, Count of Perche †; Robert Fitzwalter (POW); Saer de Quincy (POW); Gilbert de Clare (POW); Henry de Bohun (POW) |

Strength
| 923+ 406 knights 317 crossbowmen 200+ sergeants Castle garrison | 1,611 611 knights 1,000 infantry |

Casualties and losses
| Moderate | 300 knights captured, many killed or captured during the retreat south |

The Second Battle of Lincoln occurred at Lincoln Castle on Saturday 20 May 1217, during the First Barons' War, between the forces of the future Louis VIII of France and those of King Henry III of England. Louis's forces were attacked by a relief force under the command of William Marshal, 1st Earl of Pembroke. Thomas, Count of Perche, commanding the French troops, was killed and Louis was expelled from his base in the southeast of England. The looting that took place afterwards is known as the "Lincoln Fair". The citizens of Lincoln were loyal to Louis so Henry's forces sacked the city.

== Background ==
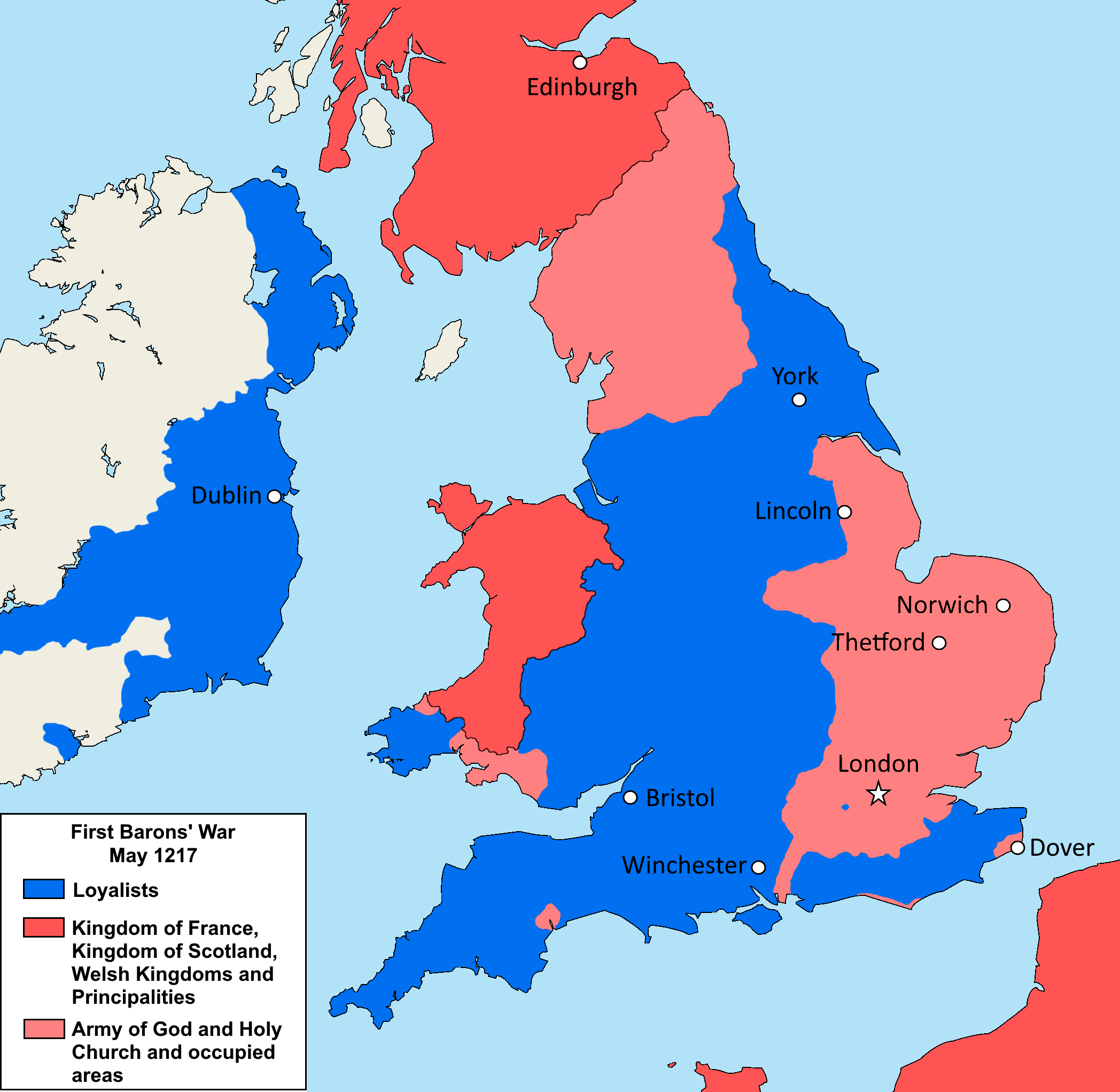
The First Barons' War right before the Battle of Lincoln, May 1217

In 1216, during the First Barons' War over the English succession, Prince Louis of France entered London and proclaimed himself King of England. Louis was supported by various English barons who resisted the rule of King John. John died in the middle of the war, and his nine-year-old son Henry III was crowned King of England as successor to his father.

Once John died, many barons were willing to change sides and fight for Henry against Prince Louis' claim. William Marshal, 1st Earl of Pembroke, a knight of great skill and prowess, served as regent for Henry. Marshal called all nobles holding castles in England to a muster in Newark. Approximately 400 knights, 250 crossbowmen, and a larger auxiliary force of both mounted and foot soldiers were assembled. Marshal marched his forces to the city of Lincoln to break Prince Louis' siege, and to inflict a decisive victory before dwindling royal funds ran out.

== Battlefield ==
Medieval Lincoln was an ancient walled city with a Norman castle near its centre, straddling the crossroads of two important Roman-built highways: Ermine Street and the Fosse Way. These trans-England routes were historic and major arteries for national trade and government, making Lincoln a strategic location. William the Conqueror had ordered the construction of Lincoln Castle on a hilltop over an old Roman fort 150 years earlier.

At the time of the battle in May 1217, Louis' forces had taken the city of Lincoln, but Lincoln Castle remained intact. Its garrison, commanded by castellan Nicola de la Haie, was loyal to King Henry and continued to defend the important fortification from forces loyal to Prince Louis, led by Thomas, the Count of Perche.

== Battle ==
Marshal's forces made their approach from the town of Stow, eleven miles northwest of Lincoln. The advance was known to Thomas, Count of Perche, but his knights were uncertain as to the enemy's strength. Two strategies were formed. Those who believed Marshal's force was relatively small in number favoured an offensive plan: a meeting in an open battlefield at the base of the hill, before Marshal could reach the city gates. Those who believed Marshal had a dangerously large force favoured a more defensive plan: delay Marshal at the gates of the city wall, and at the same time press the siege, capture the castle, and occupy this much stronger position. The defensive plan was taken, though not without some continuing dissension. Crucially, the city's western gate was left undefended, as it was believed blocked by rubble.

Marshal split his forces. Ranulf de Blondeville led an assault against the northern gate, while Falkes de Breauté led the crossbowmen into Lincoln Castle via the postern gate, where they took to the walls; volleys of bolts from this high ground rained death, damage and confusion on Perche's forces. Amidst the confusion, a third detachment cleared the rubble at the city's western gate.

Marshal's forces entered the city via the western and northern gates, and de Breauté led a sortie from the castle. A vicious melee ensued, in which Perche was killed. Following his death, his forces broke and fled via the city's southern bridge.

Those of Louis's army who were not captured fled Lincoln, by the south city gate, to London. The battle took about six hours.

== Aftermath and effects ==
The city of Lincoln was pillaged by Marshal's victorious army, on the basis that it was loyal to Louis, later euphemistically called the "Lincoln Fair". The churches and even the cathedral did not escape being plundered for they were treated as "excommunicated". Some women tried to escape the city to avoid "insult" by taking to boats with their children, these were later found to have died. To the south, inhabitants of towns between Lincoln and London ambushed and killed some of the escaping French soldiers on their flight south to London.

The Battle of Lincoln was the turning point in the First Barons' War. Many of Henry's enemies – barons who had supported Louis, and who helped supply, organise and command Louis's military forces – were captured at Lincoln. French reinforcements, under the command of Eustace the Monk, were then sent across the English Channel to bolster Louis's forces. The French ships were defeated by Hubert de Burgh in the Battle of Dover. This defeat greatly reduced the French threat to the English crown and Prince Louis and his remaining forces returned to France. In September 1217, the Treaty of Lambeth forced Louis to give up his claim to the English throne.

== See also ==
- Battle of Lincoln (1141)
- Magna Carta
- First Barons' War
