= Robert Fitzwalter =

Magna Carta surety baron and rebel leader (d. 1235)

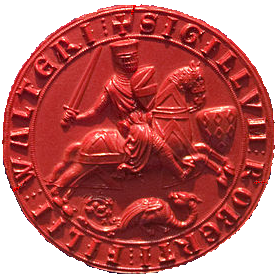
- Seal of Fitzwalter, Latin legend: SIGILLUM ROBERTI FILII WALTERI ("seal of Robert son of Walter"). Shows a mounted knight with closed flat-topped helmet at full-gallop towards sinister with a dragon under horse's hooves. He holds a sword aloft in the right hand. Fitzwalter's arms are shown in half-view on knight's heater shield and in full on horse's trapper, and a shield with the arms of his ally and cousin Saer de Quincy, 1st Earl of Winchester is in front of the horse: 7 mascles 3:3:1. Modern imprint from original die in the British Museum.
- Reign: 1198–1235
- Predecessor: Walter Fitz Robert
- Successor: Sir Walter Fitzwalter
- Died: 9 December 1235 (Note: However, Charles Lethbridge Kingsford said in his notes on John Stow's A Survey of London that he died in 1234, not 1235.); Little Dunmow, Essex, England
- Buried: Priory Church, Little Dunmow
- Noble family: Fitzwalter (Note: The title of Baron FitzWalter was created in 1295, for Robert FitzWalter, 1st Baron FitzWalter, the son of Walter fitz Robert (d. before 1258), who was the heir of Robert Fitzwalter (d. 1235).)
- Spouses: Gunnor de Valognes; Rohese
- Issue: Matilda; Christina; Robert
- Father: Walter Fitz Robert
- Mother: Maud de Lucy

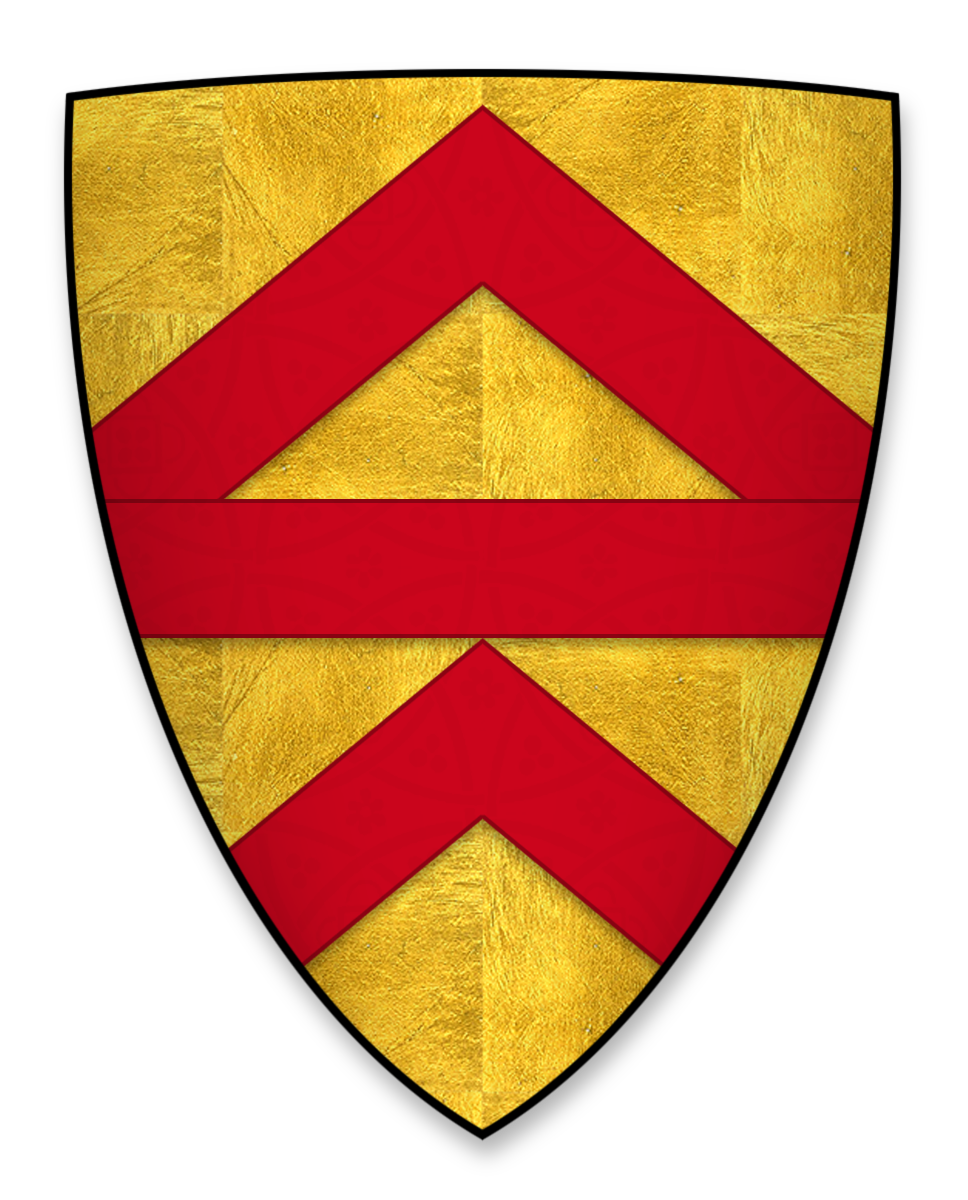
Arms adopted by Robert Fitzwalter c. 1200: Or, a fess between two chevrons gules. This is a heraldic difference of the arms of de Clare (Or, three chevrons gules), borne by his second cousin Gilbert de Clare, 5th Earl of Gloucester

Robert Fitzwalter (Note: Also spelled Fitzwater, FitzWalter, fitzWalter, etc.) (died 9 December 1235) was one of the leaders of the baronial opposition against King John, and one of the twenty-five sureties of Magna Carta. He was feudal baron of Little Dunmow, Essex and constable of Baynard's Castle, in London, to which was annexed the hereditary office of castellan and chief knight banneret of the City of London. Part of the official aristocracy created by Henry I and Henry II, he served John in the wars in Normandy, in which he was taken prisoner by King Philip II of France and forced to pay a heavy ransom.

Fitzwalter was implicated in the baronial conspiracy of 1212. According to his own statement, the king had attempted to seduce his eldest daughter, but Robert's account of his grievances varied from time to time. The truth seems to be that he was irritated by the suspicion with which John regarded the new baronage. Fitzwalter escaped a trial by fleeing to France. He was outlawed, but returned under a special amnesty after John's reconciliation with the pope.

Fitzwalter continued, however, to take the lead in the baronial agitation against the king, and upon the outbreak of hostilities in 1215 was elected "Marshal of the Army of God and Holy Church". It was due to his influence in London that his party obtained the support of the city and used it as their base of operations. The clause in Magna Carta prohibiting sentences of exile, except as the result of a lawful trial, refers more particularly to his case. He was one of the twenty-five barons appointed to enforce the promises of Magna Carta, and his aggressive attitude was one of the causes that contributed to the revival of civil war later in 1215.

Fitzwalter was one of the envoys who invited Prince Louis to England, and was the first of the barons to do homage when Louis entered London. Slighted by the French as a traitor to his natural lord, he served Louis with fidelity until he was captured at the Battle of Lincoln in May 1217. Released on the conclusion of peace, he joined the Fifth Crusade, but returned at an early date to make his peace with the regency. The remainder of his life was uneventful, and he died peacefully in 1235. He was the father of three children: Matilda, Robert, and Christina (who married William FitzGeoffrey de Mandeville, 3rd Earl of Essex). He is remembered as a champion of English liberty, and has also become associated with various legends, including that of Robin Hood.

== Family ==
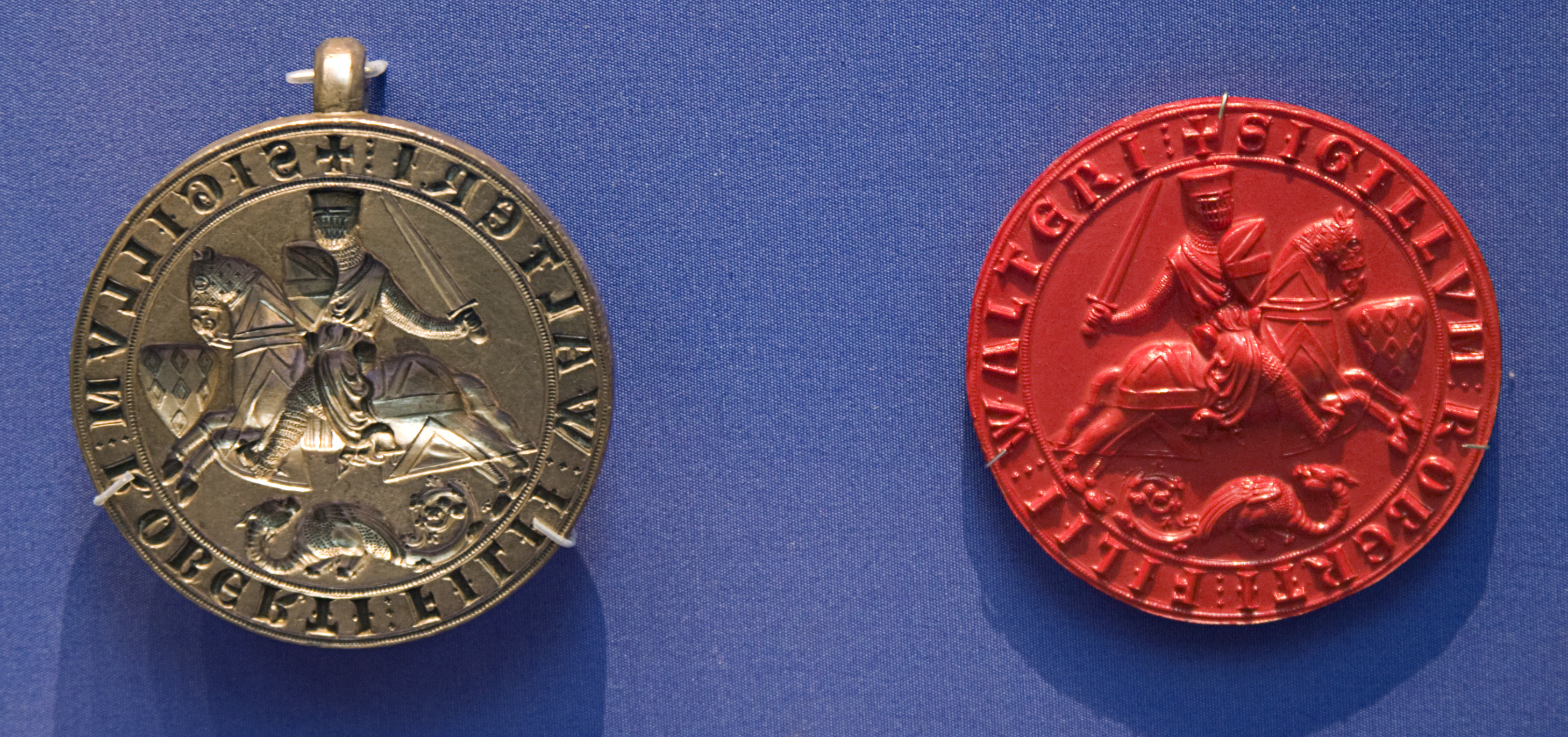
Robert FitzWalter's original seal-die, with modern wax impression, in the British Museum.

Robert Fitzwalter was the son of Walter Fitz Robert of Woodham Walter and his wife Maud (or Mathilde), the daughter of Richard de Lucy of Diss (a member of the de Lucy family). Robert was a feudal baron of the fourth generation after the Norman Conquest, great-grandson of Richard fitz Gilbert (d. c. 1090). His paternal grandfather was Richard fitz Gilbert's son Robert Fitz Richard, steward of Henry I, to whom the king had granted the lordship of Dunmow and of the honour or soke of Baynard's Castle in the southwest angle of the City of London, to which the hereditary office of castellain and chief banneret of the City of London was annexed, both of which had become forfeited to the crown by William Baynard. While steward Robert may have been descended from the powerful Norman counts of Brionne, among the higher ranks of the nobility of the Norman Conquest, the house of Fitzwalter belongs properly to the administrative families, who in the latter part of the twelfth century had stepped into the place of the old feudal houses. The house of Fitzwalter's possession of the soke of Baynard's Castle, which grew into an ordinary ward, brought it into intimate relations with the Londoners. Robert Fitzwalter was himself engaged in trade and owned wine ships which received special privileges from King John.

Nothing of Fitzwalter's birth and early life is recorded. A possible early record of him is a mention of a knight named "Robert Fitzwalter" at a tournament in Henry the Young King's retinue in 1180 at Lagny-sur-Marne. Fitzwalter was married to Gunnor or Gunnora, daughter and heiress of Robert de Valognes, sometime before his father died in 1198. His eldest son, named Robert Fitzwalter, junior, was taken prisoner along with him at Lincoln, but died before him. At his death, his heir, Walter, was underage, so that the son who fought with him at Lincoln must have been dead. This Sir Walter Fitzwalter (also known as Fitz Robert) of Dunmow Castle (c. 1222–1258), married to Ida Longespée, (Note: There may have been two Ida Longespées. The one who married Sir Walter FitzRobert of Woodham Walter, Essex, had issue, including Ela FitzWalter, wife of William de Odyngsells. These Idas have been given different parents by different genealogists: G. Andrews Moriarty suggested the two Idas were sisters; Gerald Paget suggests the Ida who married Walter FitzRobert may have been the daughter of William Longespée II, Earl of Salisbury, by his wife, Idoine de Camville.) must have been either a younger son or a grandson. After the death of Gunnor (she was alive in 1207) it is said that Fitzwalter married a second wife, Rohese, who survived him. He also had a daughter, Christina, who married William FitzGeoffrey de Mandeville, 3rd Earl of Essex.

== Career ==
When Baron Walter died in 1198, Fitzwalter succeeded to his estates, being already more than of full age and married to his first wife, Gunnor. His marriage to Gunnor had brought him 30½ knight's fees, and he inherited more than 66 from his father. He also acquired two knight's fees through Gunnor's uncle Geoffrey of Valognes, and about 1204 obtained livery of seisin of the lands of his own uncle, Godfrey de Luci, bishop of Winchester. Francisque Xavier Michel said that Fitzwalter came to be "one of the greatest men in England, and one of the most powerful". His lands were mainly situated in the north, so that his interests now became close to those of a faction called the "Aquilonares", whom he would later lead in the struggle against King John.

In the years following 1200, Fitzwalter is recorded as a participant in several lawsuits. In 1200, Fitzwalter was surety for half the fine incurred by his brother, Simon Fitzwalter, for marrying without royal licence. In 1201, he made an agreement in the curia regis with St Albans Abbey with respect to the wood of Northaw. Another suit sprang from his claim to the custody of the Hertford Castle as of ancient right. He withdrew this suit for a time, and in August 1202 King John made Fitzwalter warden of Hertford Castle by royal letters patent, releasing him from his family's debts to Jewish moneylenders as well.

Early in 1203, Fitzwalter was in attendance on the king in Normandy, in February and March at Rouen. Fitzwalter was made joint-governor of the castle of Le Vaudreuil (near the mouth of the Eure) with Saer de Quincy, later Earl of Winchester, his half-first cousin (both being grandsons of Matilda/Maud de St Liz/Senlis). After Easter King Philip II Augustus of France took the field, and despite being well fortified and supplied, the governors of Vaudreuil surrendered at the first summons. Philip shut them up in close confinement at Compiègne, where they remained until redeemed by a heavy ransom of five thousand marks. On 5 July, John issued letters patent from Rouen to certify that they had surrendered the castle by his precept, witnessed by William Marshal, but in late November, Fitzwalter's cousin William d'Aubigny was still engaged in selling some of Fitzwalter's lands to raise the ransom. The surrender of Vaudreuil has been ascribed to the cowardice of Fitzwalter and de Quincy, which contemporary sources mocked greatly. However, the actual reason for their actions, and those of the two kings, was mysterious at the time, and remains unknown. In October 1206, Fitzwalter witnessed the truce made between John and Philip Augustus at Thouars.

== 1212 Conspiracy ==
The misgovernment of John provoked Fitzwalter's profound resentment, and in 1212 he entered into intrigues with Eustace de Vesci and the Welsh prince Llewelyn ab Iorwerth against the king. According to his own statement, the king had attempted to seduce his eldest daughter Matilda, but his account of his grievances varied from time to time. Several other barons later made similar accusations, and these stories were well recorded by monastic chroniclers, so later the story of Matilda developed into a complex legend. Financial factors, "unjust exaction which reduced [the barons of England] to extreme poverty", as the monk Roger of Wendover put it, were more likely the primary reason for the dissatisfaction of barons such as Fitzwalter.

In 1212, John's quarrel with Pope Innocent III and Philip Augustus reached a breaking point, and Innocent absolved the barons of England from their allegiance to John. John was preparing to march at Nottingham against his rebellious son-in-law Llewelyn ab Iorwerth. His suspicions that his barons were plotting to capture him were aroused by private intelligence, and he turned back to London with his foreign mercenaries, disbanding his regular forces. He demanded that each baron send a relative to him as a hostage. Most of the barons did so, but Fitzwalter and de Vesci decided to flee to France and Scotland, respectively. They were condemned to perpetual exile. But John was so much alarmed that he shut himself up from his subjects and abandoned his projected Welsh campaign. John now seized upon Fitzwalter's estates, and on 14 January 1213 destroyed Baynard's Castle. He also demolished Robert's castle of Benington and his woods in Essex. Fitzwalter remained in exile until John's submission to the pope. Fitzwalter's sister, Alice Peche, was required to provide hostages to prove her loyalty. One hostage was her and Gilbert Peche's daughter, Alice.

On 13 May 1213, John promised peace and security to him as part of the conditions of his reconciliation with Rome, and on 27 May, issued letters patent informing him that he might safely come to England. On 19 July, his estates were restored. John also granted a hundred marks to his steward as compensation, and directed a general inquest into his losses, like those made in the case of the clerks who had suffered by the interdict.

== Magna Carta revolt ==
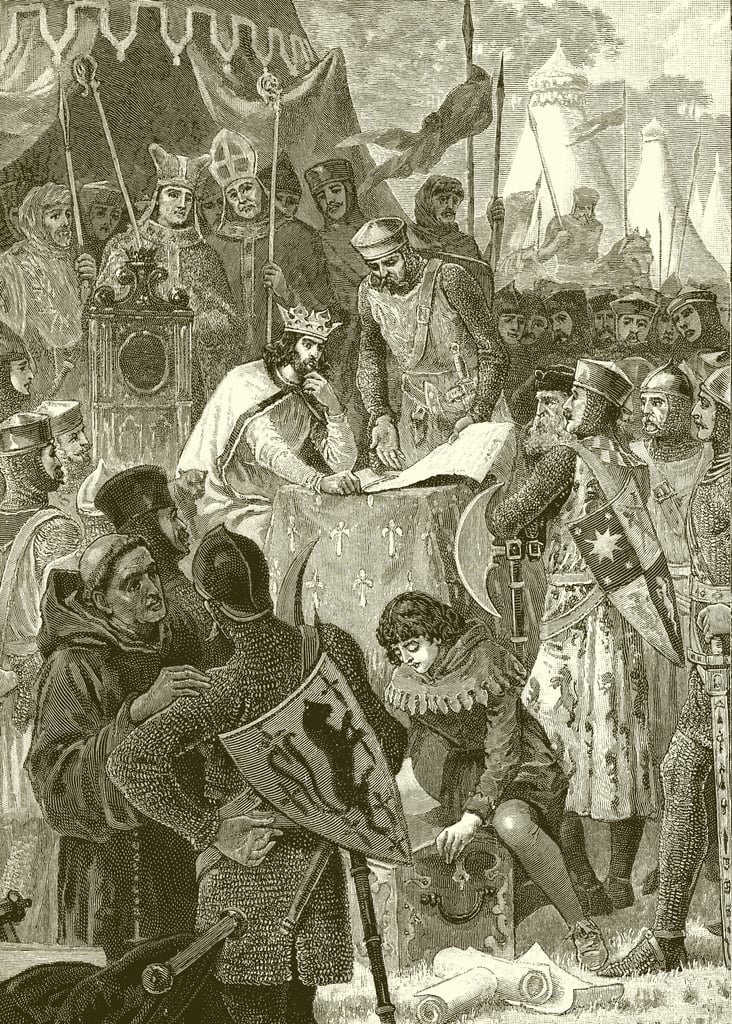
Stylised depiction of John signing of Magna Carta, from Cassell's History of England (1902)

Fitzwalter, however, remained a vigorous opponent of John's later measures. Matthew Paris said that John specially hated him, Archbishop Stephen Langton, and Saer de Quincy. In August 1213, he was at St Paul's Cathedral in London when Archbishop Langton read a charter signed by Henry I and announced that services could be conducted ahead of the lifting of the interdict on England. On 4 November 1214, Fitzwalter met in secrecy with the Archbishop and the other barons at Bury St Edmunds. The assembled barons resolved to withdraw their fealty from King John and swore at the altar of the abbey church that they would wage war on John if he did not accept their demands of a charter by Christmas. The barons and the King both began to arm themselves, and John secured the support of the Pope and took up the cross as a crusader. By January, John still refused to accede to the barons' demands and when Fitzwalter and several other barons visited him in armour at the headquarters of the Knights Templar in England in London (the modern Inns of Court) he asked for a truce until Easter.

In 1215, Fitzwalter was the first mentioned in the list of barons who assembled on Easter week (19–26 April) at Stamford. He accompanied the revolted lords on the march to Brackley in Northamptonshire on 27 April. But John now formally refused to accept the long list of demands which they forwarded to him at Oxford. Thereupon, the barons elected Fitzwalter their general, with the title of "Marshal of the Army of God and Holy Church". They solemnly renounced their homage to John and proceeded to besiege Northampton. They failed there and at Bedford, where Fitzwalter's standard-bearer was slain. But the adhesion of London secured their success. It was due to Fitzwalter's influence in London that his party obtained the support of the city and used it as their base of operations. On 17 May, Fitzwalter entered the city at the head of the "army of God", though the partisans of John still held out in the Tower. Fitzwalter and the Earl of Essex specially busied themselves with repairing the walls of London, using for the purpose the stones taken from the demolished houses of the Jews.

In June, John met the barons at Runnymede, where the two sides agreed to the Great Charter, and the barons renewed their vows of fealty. In its final draft, Magna Carta contained a clause prohibiting sentences of exile, except as the result of a lawful trial, which refers more particularly to Fitzwalter's case. Fitzwalter was one of the twenty-five executors appointed to see that its provisions were really carried out. For a short time, nominal peace prevailed, and Fitzwalter now got back the custody of Hertford Castle. But the barons remained under arms, and Fitzwalter was still acting as "Marshal of the Army of God and Holy Church". He now made a convention with John, by which London remained in the barons' hands till 15 August. But Fitzwalter was so fearful of treachery that within a fortnight of the Runnymede meeting he thought it wise to postpone a tournament fixed to be held at Stamford on the Monday after the feast of Saints Peter and Paul (29 June) for another week, and chose as the place of its meeting Hounslow Heath, that the barons might be near enough to protect London.

== First Barons' War ==
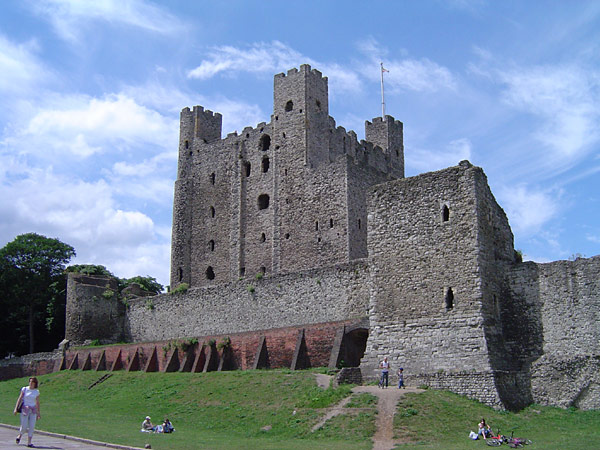
Rochester Castle, where Fitzwalter was besieged by royalists

On 26 August, John and the barons tried to arrange a meeting at Staines. When this failed, the First Barons' War broke out. The twenty-five executors assigned themselves various counties to secure them for their side. Fitzwalter, who with Eustace de Vesci was still the leading spirit of the movement, became responsible for Northamptonshire. On 17 September, John granted Fitzwalter's Cornish estates to his young son Prince Henry. But the pope's annulling the charter had paralysed the clerical supporters of the popular side, and the thoroughgoing policy of the twenty-five under Fitzwalter's guidance had alienated the more moderate men.

Fearing Archbishop Langton might be forced to surrender his castle of Rochester, Fitzwalter, with the assent of the warden of the castle, Reginald de Cornhill, secretly occupied it with a large force. John's troops soon approached, and strove, by burning Rochester bridge and occupying the left bank of the way, to cut off Fitzwalter from his London confederates. But Fitzwalter succeeded in keeping his position, though before long he was forced on 11 October to retreat to London, allowing the royalists to occupy the town and besiege the castle. John now tried to deceive him by forging letters. Fitzwalter, conscious of the weakness of his position, sought to negotiate.

On 9 November, Fitzwalter received with the Earl of Hertford and the citizens of London safe conduct for a conference, but nothing came of it. In vain, the beleaguered garrison of Rochester bitterly reproached him for deserting them. On 10 November, they were forced to surrender. On 16 December, the barons, including Fitzwalter, were excommunicated by name. French help was now their only refuge.

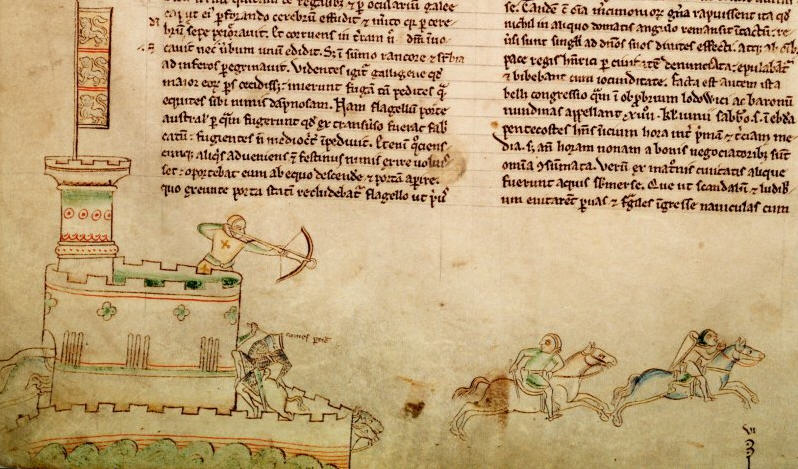
An illustration by Matthew Paris of the Second Battle of Lincoln

Fitzwalter went over to France with the Earl of Winchester and offered the throne to Louis, the son of King Philip, putting into his hands twenty-four hostages and assuring him of the support of their party. Fitzwalter was back in England early in 1216. Louis landed in May, and as John made great progress in the east, Fitzwalter busied himself in compelling Essex and Suffolk, his own counties, to accept the foreign king. The tide of fortune now turned, but after John's death on 19 October, Fitzwalter's difficulties increased. Gradually, the English went over to the side of the new king Henry III. Those who remained in arms were not respected by the French because of their betrayal of John.

On 6 December, Louis captured Hertford Castle from the followers of the new king, Henry. Fitzwalter naturally asked for the custody of a stronghold that had already been so long under his care. The French urged that a traitor to his own lord was not to be trusted, and Louis told him he must wait until the end of the war. Fitzwalter was too deeply pledged to Louis to join the deserters. He was sent from London on 30 April 1217 at the head of a strong French force to raise the siege of Mountsorrel in Leicestershire, now closely pressed by the Earl of Chester. On his way, he rested at St Albans, where his hungry troops ate up all the supplies of the abbey, according to abbey chronicler Matthew Paris. He raised the siege of Mountsorrel and advanced to Lincoln. He was met by the regent, William Marshall, whose forces were now joined by the Earl of Chester with the army that had besieged Mountsorrel. Fitzwalter was anxious for an immediate battle.

On 20 May, Fitzwalter fought in the Second Battle of Lincoln, in which the baronial forces were thoroughly defeated. Fitzwalter himself was taken prisoner along with his son and most of the leaders of his party. The Londoners still held out until Hubert de Burgh's great naval victory on 24 August. On 11 September, the Treaty of Lambeth ended the struggle. But the reissue of the charter as the result of the treaty showed that Fitzwalter's cause had triumphed in spite of his personal failure. On 8 October 1217, Fitzwalter's release from prison was ordered, and on 24 January 1218, the king granted him his scutage. In July he received the custody of his nephew, Walter Fitzsimon Fitzwalter, whose father had died.

== Later life ==
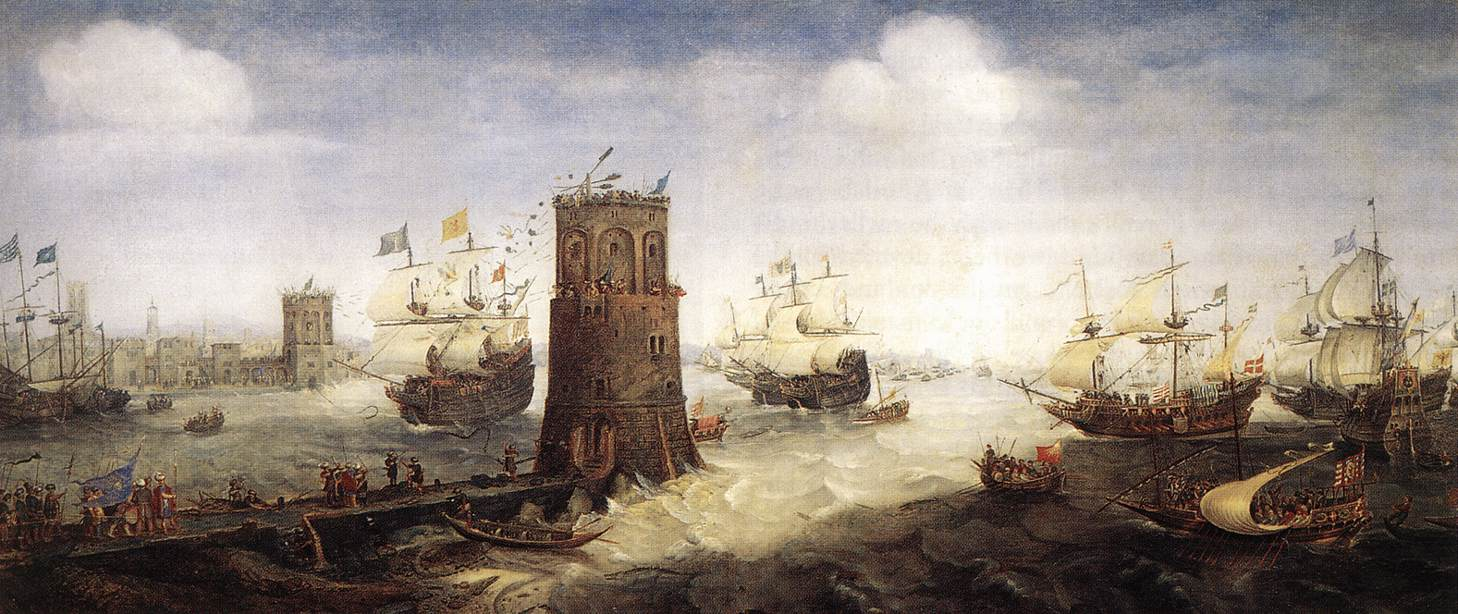
A 1628 painting by Cornelis Claesz van Wieringen depicting the 1218 siege of Damietta, in which Fitzwalter took part as a crusader

Later in the year 1218, Fitzwalter witnessed the undertaking that the Great Seal of England was to be affixed to no letters patent or charters until the king came of age. But the Fifth Crusade must have offered a convenient opportunity to him and others. In 1219, he sailed for the Holy Land along with Earl Saer of Winchester and Earl William d'Aubigny of Arundel. He departed from Genoa in August, shortly after the main force of the crusade left Brindisi, and arrived in Acre some time in September. Before he arrived, the crusading host had been diverted to the siege of Damietta. There he seems to have arrived along with Saer de Quincy and other English crusaders, at the same time as the cardinal legate Pelagius in the autumn of 1219. Saer de Quincy died on 3 November. This date makes it impossible for the statement of Walter of Coventry that they only arrived after Damietta had been captured. The town fell into the crusaders' hands on 6 November. Fitzwalter, therefore, though he is not mentioned, must have taken part in the latter part of the siege.

The crusaders remained in Egypt until August 1221. But Fitzwalter had gone home sick, probably at some earlier period. He spent the rest of his life peaceably in England, thoroughly reconciled to the government of Henry III. He must have by this time become well advanced in years. On 11 February 1225, Fitzwalter was one of the witnesses of Henry III's third confirmation of the great charter. In June 1230, he was one of those assigned to hold the assize of arms in Essex and Hertfordshire. According to Matthew Paris, he died on 9 December 1235, and was buried before the high altar at Priory Church in Little Dunmow. Administration of his goods and chattels was granted to his executors on 16 December 1235. He was described by Paris as a "noble baron, illustrious by his birth, and renowned for his martial deeds".

== Legacy ==
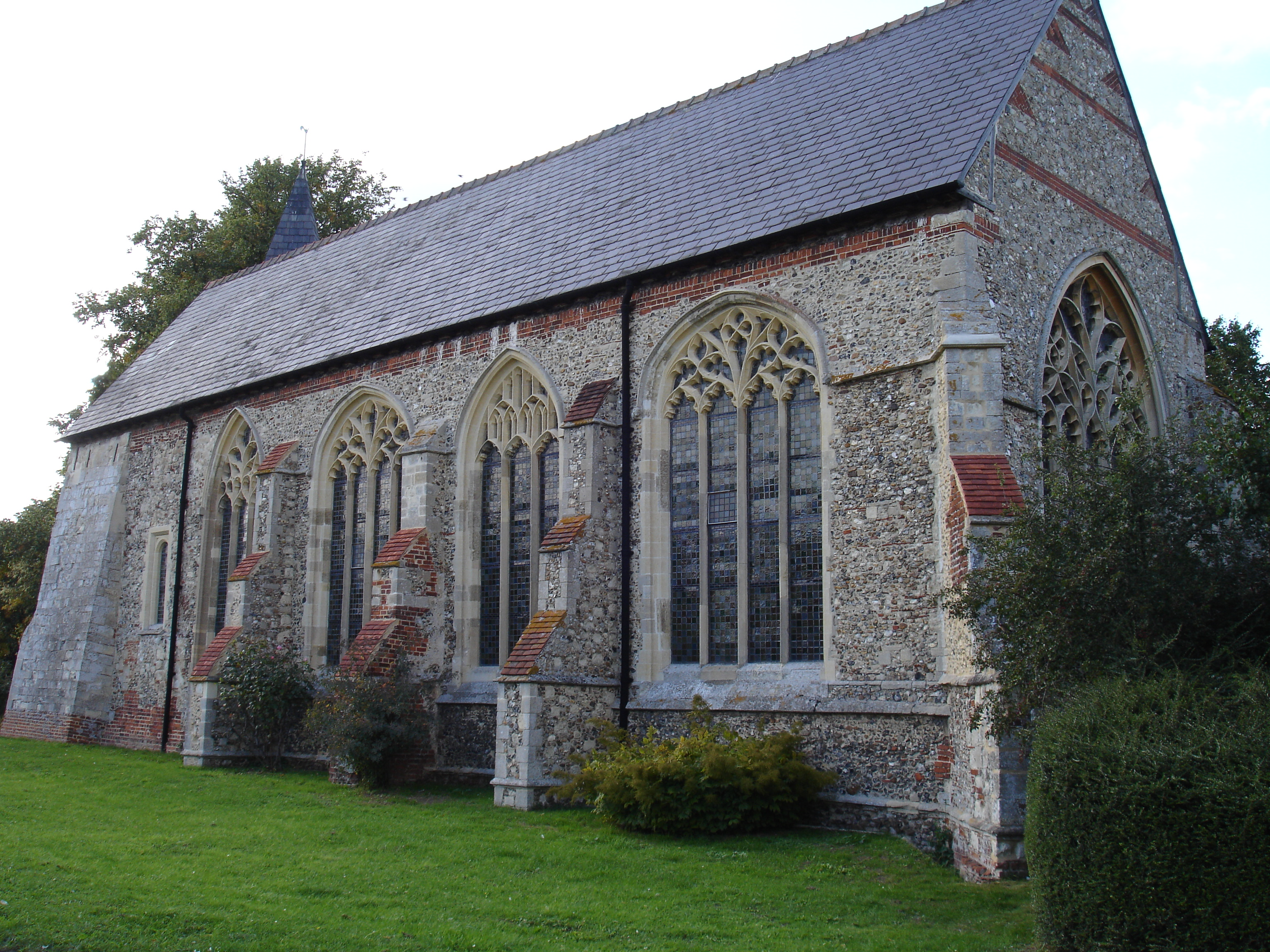
Little Dunmow Priory, where Fitzwalter is buried

A history about Fitzwalter gradually formed, as the first perceived champion of English liberty. A story first found in the manuscript chronicle of Dunmow, states Fitzwalter had a very beautiful daughter named Matilda, who indignantly rejected the immoral advances of King John. At last, as the maiden proved obdurate, John caused her to be poisoned, so that the bitterest sense of personal wrong drove Fitzwalter to take up the part of a constitutional leader. So generally was the story believed that an alabaster figure on a grey altar-tomb in Priory Church, Little Dunmow, is still sometimes pointed out as the effigy of the unfortunate Matilda.

Several poems and plays have been based upon this picturesque romance. In them, Matilda is curiously mixed up with Maid Marian, the mistress of Robin Hood. Such are the 1601 plays by Henry Chettle and Anthony Munday called The Downfall of Robert, Earl of Huntingdon, afterwards called Robin Hood, with his Love to Chaste Matilda, the Lord Fitzwater's daughter, afterwards his faire Maid Marian, and The Death of Robin Hood with the lamentable Tragedy of Chaste Matilda, his faire Maid Marian, poisoned at Dunmowe by King John. Michael Drayton also published in 1594 a poetical account, called Matilda, the faire and chaste Daughter of the Lord Robert Fitzwalter, as well as two letters in verse, purporting to be written between her and King John. Before 1639, Robert Davenport wrote another play, The Tragedy of King John and Matilda. It was also believed in the seventeenth century that Robert Fitzwalter, "or one of his successors", was the founder of the flitch of bacon custom in Little and Great Dunmow. Fitzwalter and King John are the two central characters in the comic monologue Magna Charter by Marriott Edgar.
