= Flitch Green =

Civil parish in Essex, England

Coordinates: 51.8605°N 0.4157°E

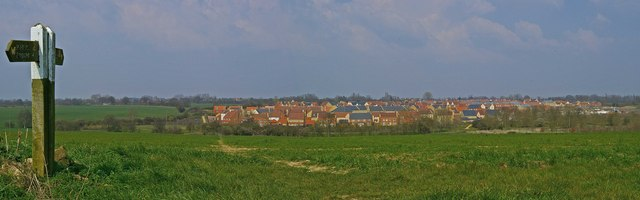
- Flitch Green

- Location within Essex
- Population: 2,645 (2021)
- OS grid reference: TL656214
- Civil parish: Flitch Green
- District: Uttlesford
- Shire county: Essex
- Region: East
- Country: England
- Sovereign state: United Kingdom
- Post town: DUNMOW
- Postcode district: CM6
- Dialling code: 01371
- Police: Essex
- Fire: Essex
- Ambulance: East of England

Flitch Green is a village and civil parish in the Uttlesford district of Essex, England. It is a new village, having been built since 2001 on the site of an old sugar beet factory. Flitch Green is near the A120 dual carriageway, the villages of Felsted and Little Dunmow, and the town of Great Dunmow, the last of which is about 5 miles (8.0 km) away. At the 2021 census the parish had a population of 2,462.

The development, originally named 'Oakwood Park', is next to the Flitch Way, a public right of way between Bishop's Stortford and Braintree where the old railway line used to run. The name 'Flitch' refers to the local Flitch of bacon custom. Building of Flitch Green began in 2001.

When construction began, Flitch Green was part of the parish of Little Dunmow. It was made a separate parish in 2009.

Flitch Green Primary School, which serves the estate, was opened in September 2008. The primary school converted to The Flitch Green Academy in 2011.

Flitch United Youth Football Club are based on Flitch Green. They currently comprise youth teams from under 8’s to under 12’s and a ladies and men’s adult teams.
