= Flitch of bacon custom =

Old marriage custom in England

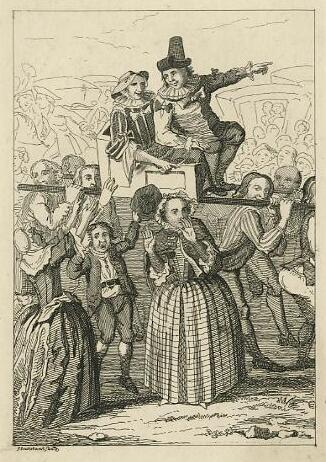
Thomas and Ann Shakeshaft, awarded the Dunmow flitch in 1751, being carried in procession through the town. Etching by George Cruikshank.

The awarding of a flitch of bacon (Note: A flitch is the side, or a steak cut from the side, of an animal or fish. The term now usually occurs only in connection with a side of salted and cured pork in the phrase a flitch of bacon.) to married couples who can swear to not having regretted their marriage for a year and a day is an old tradition, the remnants of which still survive in Great Dunmow, Essex.

The Dunmow tradition originated nearby at Little Dunmow, where it was practised until the mid-eighteenth century. The origin of the custom is unknown, but according to tradition it was instituted by Robert Fitzwalter in the 13th century. The Dunmow flitch is referred to in Piers Plowman and by Chaucer, and seems to have already been widely known at that time. A similar tradition practised at Wychnor in Staffordshire can be traced back to the fourteenth century; related customs are also known from mainland Europe in Brittany and Vienna.

The Dunmow tradition died out after 1751. Over the following century, several couples attempted to claim the flitch but were turned down, before the tradition was revived in 1855, largely inspired by the novel The Flitch of Bacon by William Harrison Ainsworth. The revived tradition continues in Great Dunmow. Every leap year, a public mock trial is held for claimants of the flitch; counsels are appointed for the claimants and for the flitch and they argue their case in front of a jury of six maidens and six bachelors.

== Dunmow ==
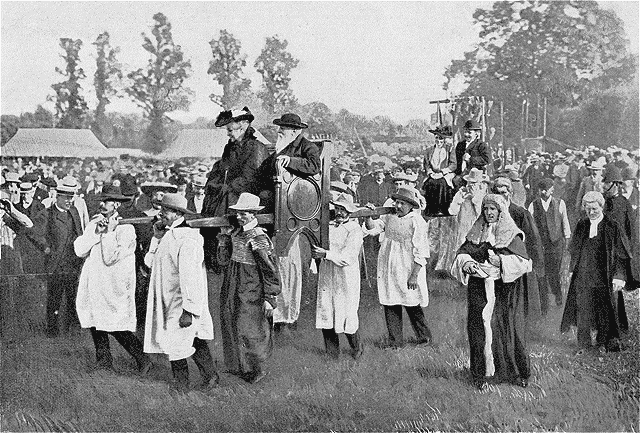
The Dunmow flitch of bacon festivities in 1905

The best known example of the awarding of a flitch of bacon to married couples occurred at Little Dunmow Priory in Essex. The origin of the custom is unknown. According to tradition it was begun by Robert Fitzwalter in the 13th century, as a condition of the land he gave to the priory. In a version of this story created by the Victorian writer William Harrison Ainsworth, Fitzwalter and his wife disguised themselves as peasants and begged the prior of Dunmow for his blessing after a year of marriage; the prior gave the couple a flitch of bacon and Fitzwalter in return gave land to the priory on the condition that they should give a flitch of bacon to any subsequent couple who could swear that they had not regretted their marriage for a year. The origins of the custom may be significantly earlier: Francis Steer suggests that it may have been used by the Saxon church to encourage marriage.

The Dunmow flitch was apparently widely known by the late fourteenth century, when it was alluded to by William Langland in Piers Plowman and Geoffrey Chaucer in "The Wife of Bath's Tale". The earliest surviving record of the flitch being awarded, from the cartulary of Dunmow Priory, dates to 1445, some time after the custom was mentioned by Langland and Chaucer. Two further occasions on which the flitch was awarded are recorded before the dissolution of the monasteries, after which the tradition fell into abeyance.

After the Reformation, the flitch tradition was continued by secular authorities. It was awarded on two occasions in the eighteenth century; following the second of these, in 1751, the custom once again fell into abeyance. Couples attempted to claim the flitch several times but the lord of the manor refused to award it. In 1772, the gates of Dunmow Priory were nailed shut to prevent John and Susan Gilder from claiming it, and in 1832 Joshua Vines and his wife similarly failed to claim the flitch. In the first half of the nineteenth century, several flitches were awarded privately: in 1830 a silver flitch was given to the Duke of St. Albans, and in 1837 the mayor of Saffron Walden awarded a flitch at the annual agricultural dinner. In 1841 it was rumoured that Queen Victoria was offered a flitch on the anniversary of her marriage to Prince Albert. In 1851 a farmer from nearby Felsted was refused the flitch, but on this occasion there was sufficient popular support to revive the custom that a flitch was awarded privately at the nearby village of Little Easton.

The 1751 ceremony was painted by David Ogborne, and prints of Ogborne's depiction were published on at least three occasions. One of these prints was cited by William Harrison Ainsworth as a source for his 1854 novel, The Flitch of Bacon. Ainsworth's novel proved so popular that it revived the custom which has continued in one form or another down to the present day and is now held every leap year.

For the three awards of the flitch before the dissolution of the monasteries, there is no record of a jury judging the claimants; according to Steer "it must be assumed that the seriousness of the oath was sufficient to prevent perjury". In 1701, a jury of five women assessed the claimants, while in 1751 there was a jury of six men and six women. The records dealing with the 1751 ceremony record the oath:

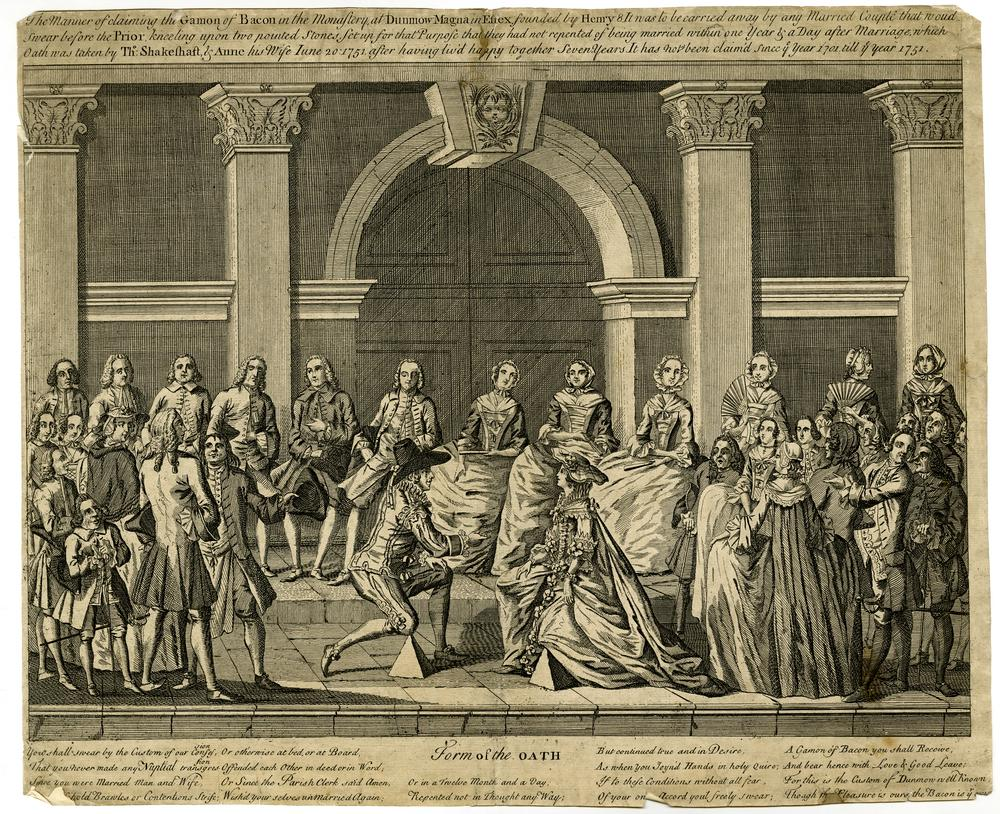
Thomas and Anne Shakeshaft swear the flitch oath

You shall swear by the custom of our confession
That you never made any nuptial transgression
Since you were marri'd man & wife
By household brawls or contentious strife
Or otherwise in bed or at board
Offended each other in deed or in word
Or since the parish clerk said Amen (Note: In the version of the oath currently used, this couplet is switched with the one following)
Wished yourselves unmarri'd agen
Or in a twelve month & a day
Repented not in thought any way
But continued true & in desire
As when you join'd hands in holy quire
If to these conditions without all fear
Of your own accord you will freely swear
A gammon of bacon you shall receive
And bear it hence with love & good leave
For this is our custom at Dunmow well known
Though the sport be ours, the bacon's your own

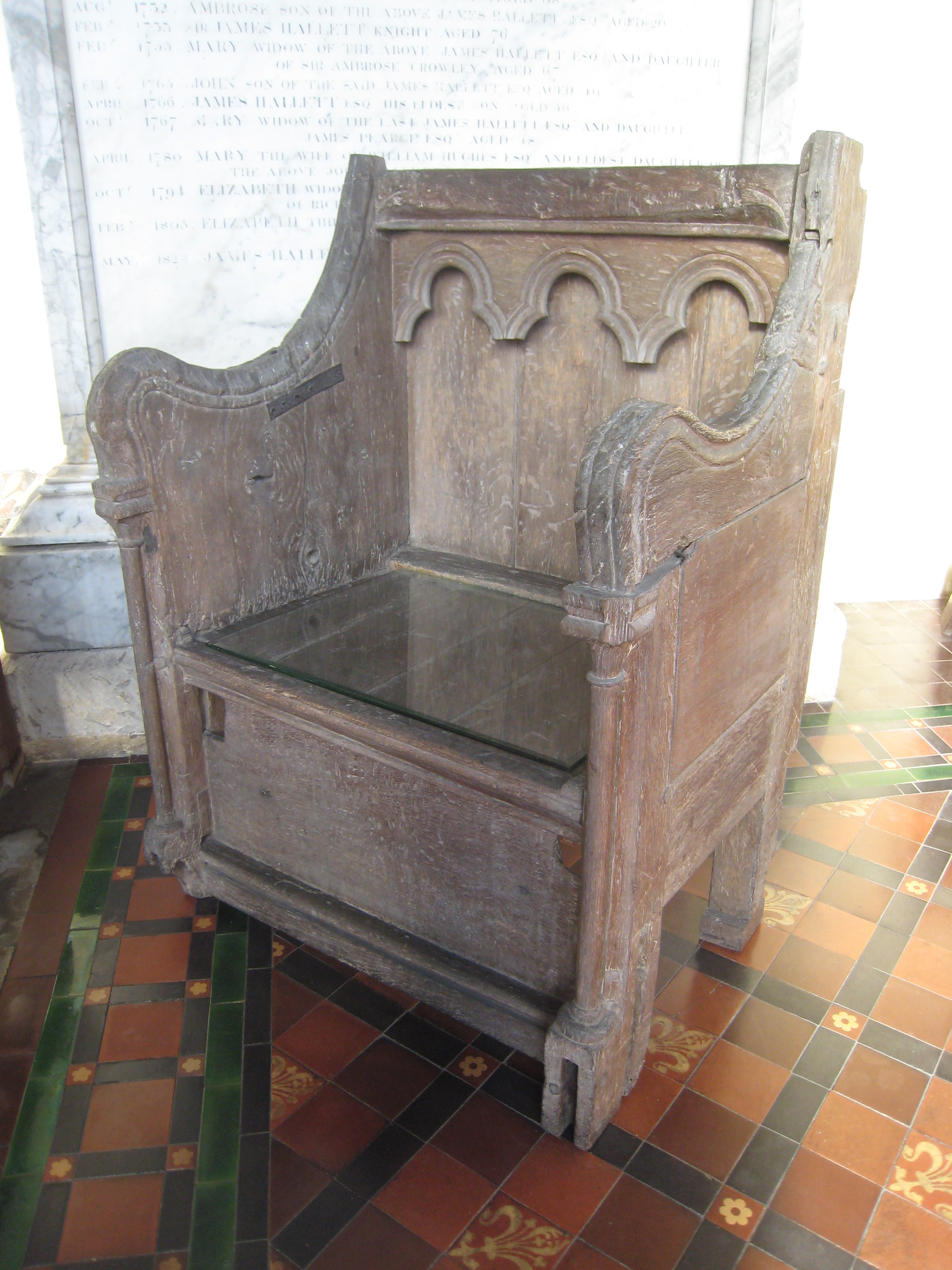
The old Flitch Chair, now preserved in St Mary's Church in Little Dunmow.

It is uncertain whether the oath was originally sworn by the husband alone, or by both husband and wife. The reference to the custom in the Wife of Bath's Tale suggests that it was only the husband, whereas in Piers Plowman it seems as though both husband and wife are expected to swear. The original form of the oath is also unknown. Charles Kightly observes that the surviving oath has a "suspiciously 18th-century ring", and Francis Peabody Magoun comments that it is "certainly centuries younger than that by which any friends of the Wife of Bath ever swore". Steer traces the oath as far as 1662, when it is quoted in Thomas Fuller's Worthies of England.

By the time of the eighteenth-century awards, the oath was taken by the couple kneeling on pointed stones, after which they were carried in a wooden chair around the village. A chair which was used for this purpose, made from medieval choir stalls, survives in the church at Little Dunmow.

There are six known recipients of the flitch in the period prior to its revival:

- Richard Wright, a yeoman from Bawburgh, Norfolk, 1445
- Stephen Samuel, a husbandman from Little Easton, 1467
- Thomas le Fuller, from Coggeshall, Essex, 1510
- John Reynolds, a gentleman, and his wife Ann, from Hatfield Broad Oak, 27 June 1701
- William Parsley, a butcher, and his wife Jane, from Great Easton, 27 June 1701
- Thomas Shakeshaft, a weaver, and his wife Ann, from Wethersfield, 20 June 1751

=== Revival ===
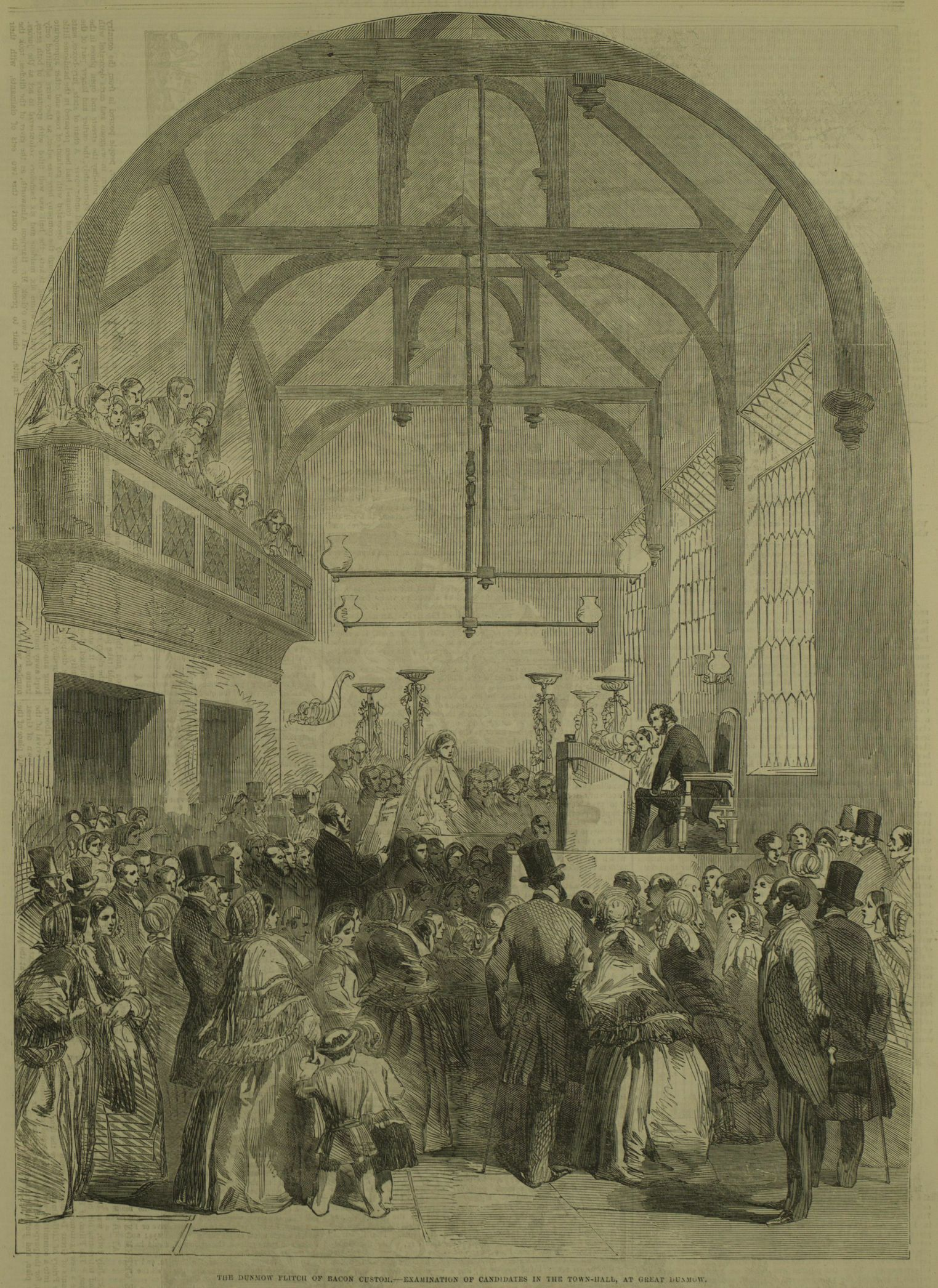
The first revived flitch trial, in 1855, from the Illustrated London News

In 1855, the year after the publication of Ainsworth's novel The Flitch of Bacon, the flitch custom was revived in the nearby town of Great Dunmow. Ainsworth presided over the ceremony and presented one of the two flitches awarded. The revival turned what was originally a private claim into a public spectacle. In its modern incarnation, the awarding of the flitch involves a mock trial, with representatives for the claimants and "for the bacon" making their cases in front of an audience and jury.

Modern flitch trials continue to be held at Great Dunmow every leap year. The day of the flitch trials begins with a procession through the town to the marquee in which the trials are held; the jury is then sworn in and the trials begin. Successful modern claimants are carried in a chair, by bearers dressed in traditional outfits, from the trial location to the old town hall; there they swear the oath and are presented with the flitch. The pointed stones on which couples were traditionally supposed to have knelt to take the flitch oath were removed from the churchyard in the eighteenth century; a new stone has been produced for the modern ceremony. Unsuccessful modern claimants are given a gammon.

In 2006, following the passing of the Civil Partnership Act 2004, which allowed same-sex couples in the United Kingdom to have a legally-recognised union similar to marriage, it was proposed that they should be eligible to claim the flitch. The flitch trial committee ruled that only legally married couples should be eligible, and that civil partners were thus unable to claim the flitch. Following the legalisation of same-sex marriage in England, Wales, and Scotland in 2014, the 2016 trials were the first in which same-sex couples were eligible to claim the flitch; in 2024 a Dunmow couple, Emma Hynds and Emma D'Costa, became the first both to apply for and to be awarded the flitch.

Since the revival of the Dunmow custom, flitch trials have been held in several other places in Britain, including Ilford, Tunbridge Wells, and Oulton Broad. In 1905 a ceremony was also held in New York.

== Wychnor ==
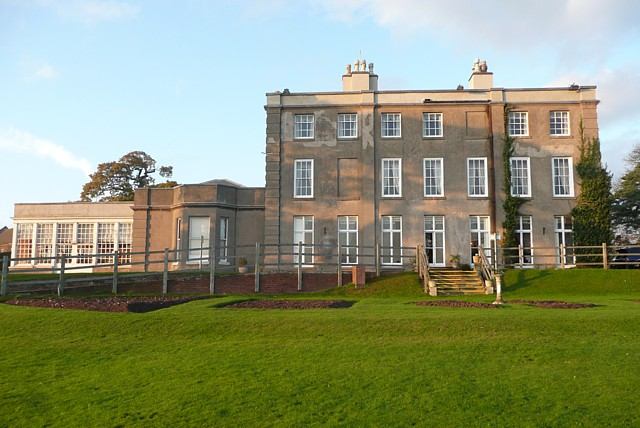
Wychnor Hall in Staffordshire

A similar custom is recorded at Wychnor, near Lichfield, Staffordshire. There, in addition to awarding the flitch of bacon to couples a year and a day after their marriage, it was also granted to clergymen a year and a day after their retirement. The Wychnor custom was said to have been a condition of the deed which granted the manor of Wychnor to Sir Philip de Somerville, about 1336. The couple claiming the bacon swore an oath which is reminiscent of the traditional English wedding vows:

Hear ye, Sir Philip de Somervile, lord of Whichenoure, mayntayner and gyver of this Baconne, that I, [husband], sythe I wedded [wife], my Wife, and sythe I had hyr in my kepyng and at my wylle by a yere and a day after our mariage, I wold not have chaunged for none other, farer ne fowler; rycher ne powrer; ne for none other descended of gretter lynage; slepyng ne waking at noo time; and yf the seyd [wife] were sole and I sole, I wolde take her to be my wyfe before all the wymen of the worlde, of what condiciones soevere they be, good or evylle, as help me God, and his Seyntys, and this flesh and all fleshes.

There is a wooden carving of a flitch of bacon and the oath above the fireplace in Wychnor Hall. Successful couples were escorted away with "trompets, tabourets, and other manoir of mynstralcie". If the claimant was a villein, they were also given corn and cheese.

The Wychnor flitch custom was satirised in a piece published in the Spectator in 1714. The author says that only two couples successfully claimed the flitch in a century:

The first was a sea captain and his wife, who since the day of their marriage had not seen each other till the day of the claim. The second was an honest pair in the neighbourhood. The husband was a man of plain good sense, and a peaceable temper. The woman was dumb.

According to Thomas Pennant, who visited Wychnor Hall in 1780, the flitch had in fact never been claimed.

== Other traditions ==
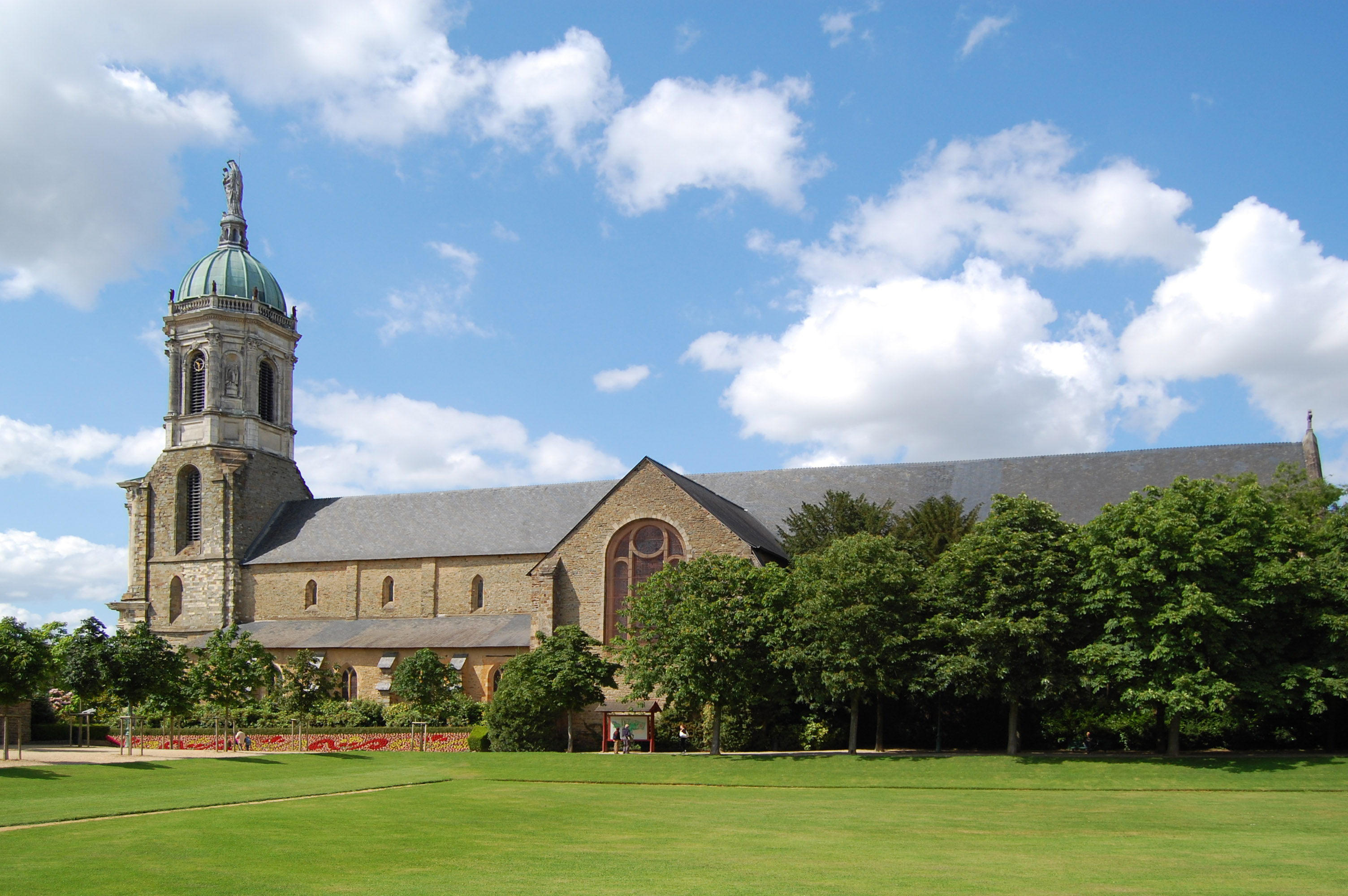
Church of Saint Melaine, Rennes, where a medieval flitch of bacon custom existed

It is possible that the flitch of bacon custom was at one time quite widespread. The survival of the custom independently at Dunmow and Wychnor suggests that it was once practised more widely. (Note: Alternatively, Charles Kightly suggests that the Wychnor flitch may have begun as an imitation of the Dunmow custom) In Brittany, a flitch of bacon tradition at the Abbey of St Melaine, Rennes, was mentioned in 1585 by Noël du Fail. There the bacon is said to have hung for six centuries without being claimed. An earlier mention of a French tradition, by Jacques de Vitry in the thirteenth century, mentions "a certain town in France" where a gammon or flitch of bacon could be claimed by a man who had not regretted his marriage in one year. The tradition is also attested in Vienna, where a flitch hung by the Red Tower Gate.

== In the arts and culture ==
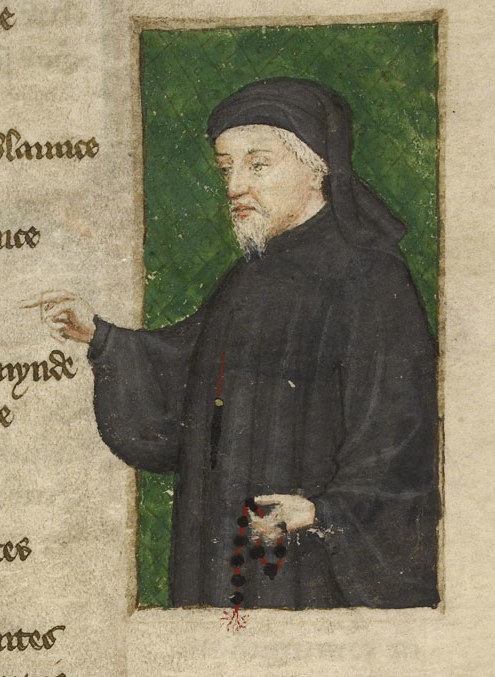
Geoffrey Chaucer. Chaucer's Wife of Bath's Tale contains one of the earliest known references to the Dunmow flitch

The Dunmow flitch custom has frequently featured in literature and art. It was often used as a source of humour: a couple winning the flitch only to have it rescinded as it caused an argument was a standard trope.

The earliest literary references to the Dunmow flitch custom come from William Langland's Piers Plowman and Chaucer's Wife of Bath's Tale. It subsequently appears in the fifteenth-century poem Peter Idley's Instructions to His Son, where the narrator discusses the Dunmow flitch as encouragement to marital fidelity, and Ben Jonson alludes to the custom in Bartholomew Fair.

Henry Bate Dudley's "ballad opera" The Flitch of Bacon was first performed in 1778; it continued to be widely produced into the nineteenth century. In the nineteenth century, William Harrison Ainsworth's novel The Flitch of Bacon was set around a fictional inn called "The Dunmow Flitch", and is about the attempts of the inn's landlord to win the flitch. The novel was popular, and was produced as an opera in the early 20th century.

The 1952 film Made in Heaven, starring David Tomlinson and Petula Clark, is about a married couple attempting to win the Dunmow flitch. A game show inspired by the Dunmow flitch trials, Seven Year Flitch, featured couples competing to prove how strong their relationship was. The Dunmow Flitch is also one of the English customs parodied by Terry Pratchett in A Tourist Guide to Lancre. In Pratchett's book, the character Nanny Ogg claims that if a man can swear in front of a jury that he has never regretted being married in seven years, "he is beaten near senseless with the flitch for lying, but brought round with strong drink and the rest of the day is a fair".

== Bibliography ==
- Ainsworth, William Harrison (1854). The Flitch of Bacon. B. Tauchnitz.
- Andrewes, William (1877). History of the Dunmow Flitch of Bacon Custom. London: William Tegg & Co.
- Buckton, Henry (2012). Yesterday's Country Customs: A History of Traditional English Folklore. The History Press.
- Dunmow Historical and Literary Society (1994). The Dunmow Centenary Book 1894–1994.
- Kightly, Charles (1986). The Customs and Ceremonies of Britain: An Encyclopedia of Living Traditions. Thames and Hudson.
- Magoun, Francis P. (1976). "The Dumdow Flitch: An Addendum and Adieu". Neuphilologisch Mitteilungen. 77 (2).
- O'Neill, Rosemary (2021). "Freedom and Choice: Postnuptial Negotiation, the Flitch of Bacon Custom, and the Woe of Marriage in The Wife of Bath's Prologue and Tale and The Book of Margery Kempe". In Rowley, Sharon M. (ed.). Writers, Editors and Exemplars in Medieval English Texts. Palgrave Macmillan.
- Pratchett, Terry; Simpson, Jacqueline (2014). The Folklore of Discworld. New York: Anchor Books.
- Robertson-Scott, J. W. (1909). The Strange Story of the Dunmow Flitch. Dunmow: D. Carter.
- Roud, Stephen (2006). The English Year: A Month-by-Month Guide to the Nation's Customs and Festivals, from May Day to Mischief Night. Penguin.
- Savage, James E. (1966). "Some Antecedents of the Puppet Play in Bartholomew Fair". Studies in English. 7.
- Shaver, Chester L. (1935). "A Medieval French Analogue to the Dunmow Flitch". Modern Language Notes. 50 (5): 322–325. doi:10.2307/2912517. JSTOR 2912517.
- Steer, Francis W. (1951). The History of the Dunmow Flitch Ceremony. Chelmsford: Essex Record Office Publications.
- Whannel, Gary (1992). "The Price is Right but the Moments are Sticky". In Strinati, Dominic; Wagg, Stephen (eds.). Come on Down? Popular Media Culture in Post-War Britain.
- Woolgar, C. M. (2016). The Culture of Food in England, 1200–1500. New Haven, Connecticut: Yale University Press.
