= Little Dunmow Priory =

Augustinian priory in Essex, England

Coordinates: 51.865084°N 0.403823°E

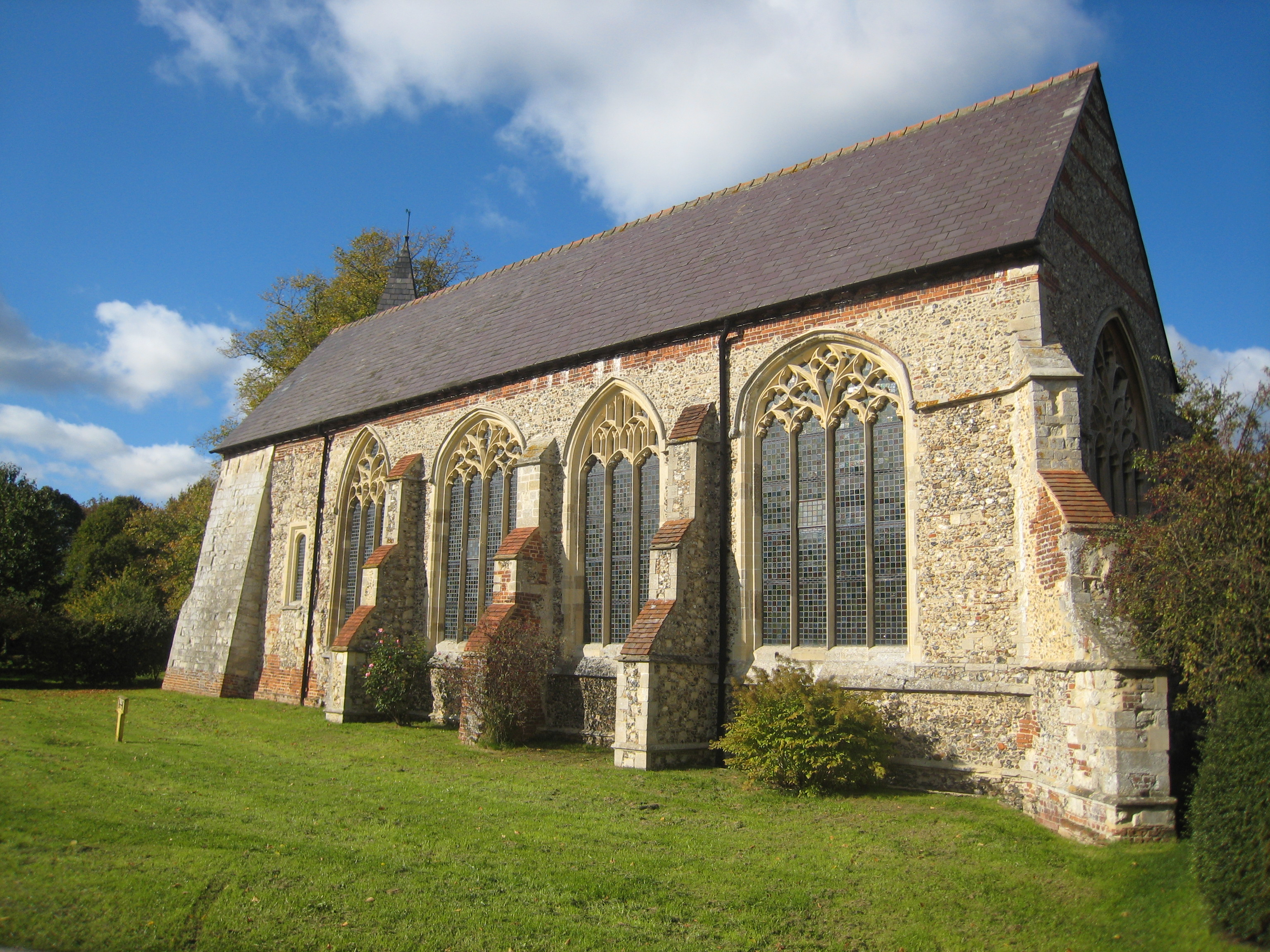
St Mary's Church, Little Dunmow; formerly the Lady Chapel Of Little Dunmow Priory (plan below)

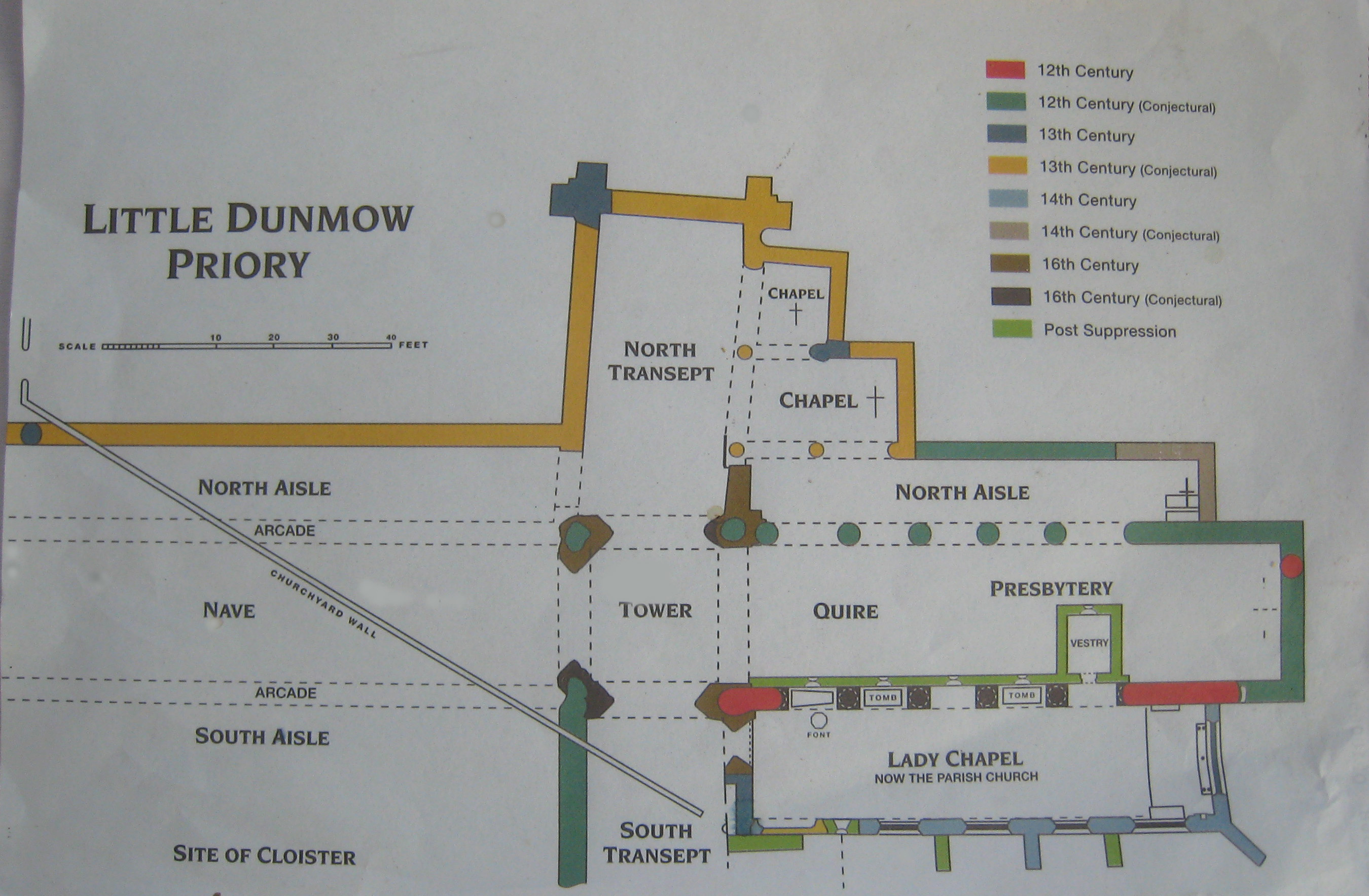
Plan of the Priory

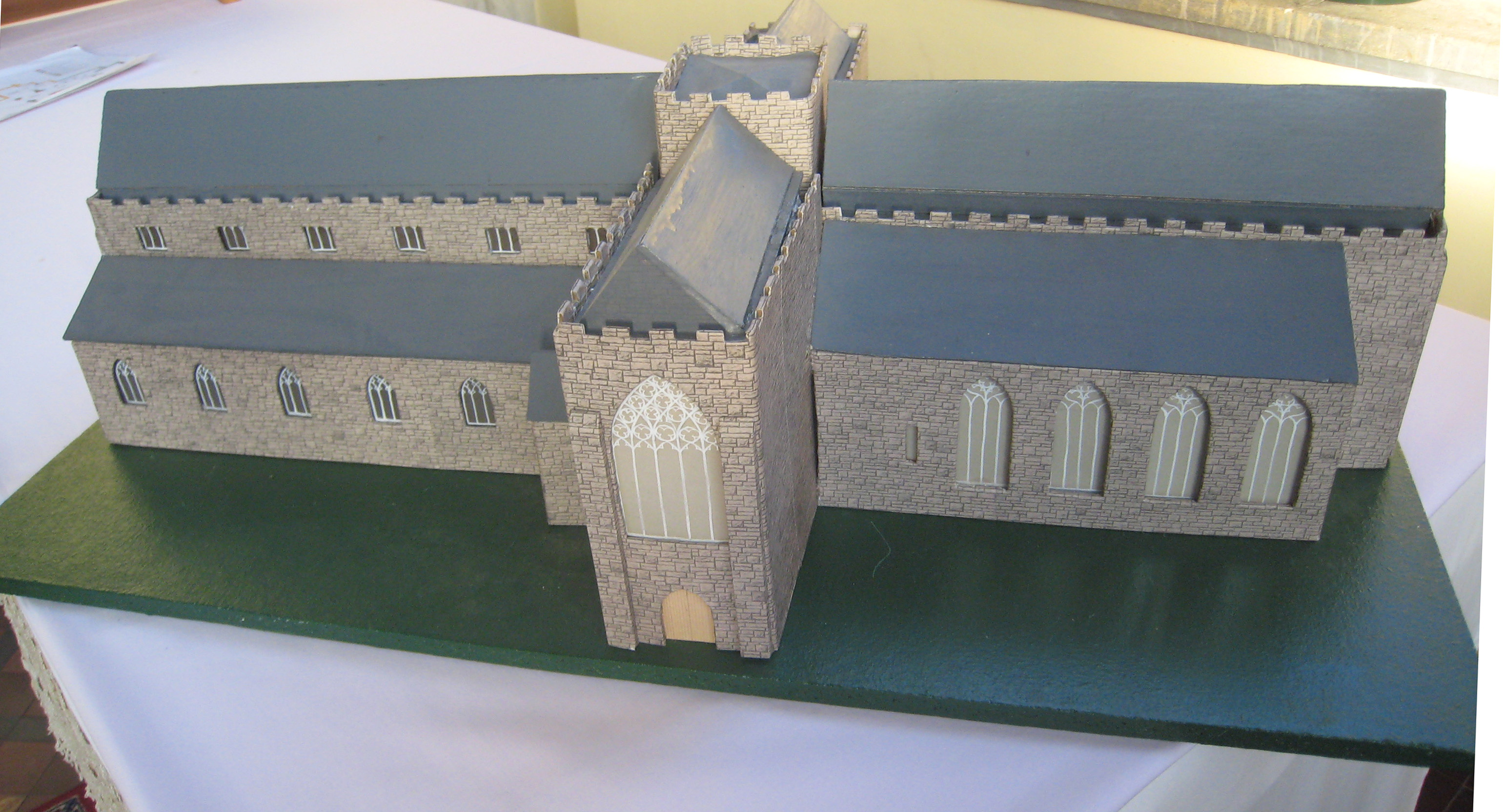
Model of the Priory in its heyday

Little Dunmow Priory in Little Dunmow was an Augustinian priory in Essex, England. The priory was founded as a church by Juga de Baynard in 1104, dedicated to the Blessed Virgin Mary and consecrated by Maurice, bishop of London. Juga was the widow of Ralph Baynard, baron of Little Dunmow, sheriff of Essex and builder of Baynard's Castle in the City of London, since demolished. Her son Geoffrey was sheriff of Yorkshire who, in 1097, beat William II, Count of Eu in a trial by battle. After her death (c.1106), and following her wishes and the advice of Anselm, the Archbishop of Canterbury, Geoffrey populated Juga's church with Augustinian canons. In 1110, Lady Juga’s grandson, and Geoffrey’s son, William de Baynard, fell from grace and lost his lands. Henry I gave those lands to Robert Fitz Richard, but Henry and his wife Matilda of Scotland confirmed the canons’ possessions in Little Dunmow. Robert’s wife Maud, the step-daughter of Matilda’s brother David I, gave more lands to the canons, establishing the priory in perpetuity.

Much of the history of Little Dunmow Priory was unremarkable, but in 1369, canon William de Stoke was arrested for counterfeiting the king's money.

Never large nor rich, Little Dunmow Priory, assessed at around £150, came under the Suppression of Religious Houses Act 1535 and was closed down. Its lands were given to Robert Radcliffe, 1st Earl of Sussex.

Although the monastic complex was destroyed, the lady chapel is still in use today as the parish church.

The plan of the priory was determined by excavation in 1913 and 1914.

== Burials in the priory church ==
- Walter Fitz Robert (c. 1124–1198), 2nd Lord of Little Dunmow, Essex
- Robert Fitzwalter (died 9 December 1235), feudal baron of Little Dunmow, Essex
- Walter of Bibbesworth (1235–1270), English knight and Anglo-Norman poet.
- Aveline FitzJohn FitzGeoffrey (1235–1274), wife of Sir Walter de Burgh, Earl of Ulster
- John FitzWalter, 2nd Baron FitzWalter (1315–1361)
- Walter FitzWalter, 7th Baron FitzWalter (1400–1431)

According to local legend, it is the resting place of Maid Marian.
