= Listed buildings in Wychnor =

Wychnor is a civil parish in the district of East Staffordshire, Staffordshire, England. It contains 15 buildings that are recorded in the National Heritage List for England. Of these, one is listed at Grade II*, the middle grade, and the others are at Grade II, the lowest grade. The parish contains the village of Wychnor and the surrounding countryside. The Trent and Mersey Canal passes through the parish and the listed buildings associated with it are two bridges and a milepost. The other listed buildings include a church, a country house and associated structures, farmhouses, and farm buildings.

== Key ==
Grade	Criteria
II*	Particularly important buildings of more than special interest
II	Buildings of national importance and special interest

== Buildings ==
Name and location	Photograph	Date	Notes	Grade
St Leonard's Church; 52.74204°N 1.73949°W		14th century	The church contains some 12th-century material, and alterations were made in the 17th century. It is built in red sandstone with some brick in the tower, the roofs are tiled with parapet verges, and the church is in Decorated style. It consists of a nave, a south aisle, a chancel, and a southwest tower. The tower has three stages, the lower part is in stone and the upper parts in brick. It has diagonal buttresses, and an embattled parapet with gargoyles in the centre of each face.	II*
Church Farmhouse; 52.74323°N 1.73870°W	—	18th century	The farmhouse was later altered and extended. It has a timber framed core, and has been refaced and extended in red brick, partly rendered, and has a tile roof. There are two storeys and an attic, and a U-shaped plan, consisting of an original hall range and a cross-wing, and a later two-storey wing with dentilled eaves. There is a gabled porch on the cross-wing, the doorway is arched and has a fanlight, and the windows are casements, those in the later wing with segmental heads.	II
Wychnor Hall; 52.74821°N 1.76080°W		Early 18th century	A country house that was remodelled in the 19th century. It is in rendered brick with stone dressings, quoins, a parapet, and a hipped slate roof. There are three storeys and an L-shaped plan. The entrance front has seven bays, the three middle bays recessed, and a portico with four Tuscan columns. To the right is a two-storey three-bay wing, and there is a further wing recessed beyond it. To the west of the garden front is a pedimented orangery, and the windows are sashes.	II
Garden walls, Wychnor Hall; 52.74925°N 1.76321°W	—	18th century	The walls enclose three sides of a garden, the southwest side being open. They are in red brick with stone coping, and are about 5 metres (16 ft) high. On the northwest side the wall is stepped over a round archway containing an elaborate wrought iron gate.	II
Bridge No 43; 52.74284°N 1.72685°W		Late 18th century	An accommodation bridge over the Trent and Mersey Canal, it is in red brick with stone copings and quoins. The bridge consists of one segmental arch, and has concave faces, and parapets dying into the ground.	II
Canal milepost 52.74223°N 1.73099°W		1819	The milepost is on the towpath of the Trent and Mersey Canal. It is in cast iron, and consists of a circular post with a moulded head and two convex tablets. On the tablets are inscribed the distances in miles to Shardlow and to Preston Brook, and the date and details of the maker are on the shaft.	II
Hill Farmhouse; 52.74353°N 1.74206°W	—	Early 19th century	A red brick farmhouse with a band and a tile roof. There are two storeys and an attic, and a U-shaped plan with a front of three bays. On the front is a gabled porch, the windows are small-paned casements with segmental heads, and there is a central flat-roofed dormer.	II
Wychnor Bridges Farmhouse; 52.74281°N 1.72588°W	—	Early 19th century	The farmhouse is in red brick with stone dressings, bands, and a hipped tile roof. There are three storeys and seven bays, the middle three bays projecting and canted. The ground floor forms a porch with four Tuscan columns, above which is a moulded frieze, and the windows are sashes.	II
Outbuildings south of Wychnor Bridges Farmhouse; 52.74267°N 1.72616°W	—	Early 19th century	The outbuildings consist of a stable and hayloft. They are in red brick with a tile roof, hipped at the south end, and are about 30 metres (98 ft) long. The building contains an elliptical-headed carriage entrance, a mullioned and transomed window with a segmental head to the left, and a loft door to the right.	II
Smithy Cottage and buildings north of Wychnor Bridges Farmhouse; 52.74305°N 1.72562°W	—	Early 19th century	The buildings are in red brick with tile roofs. The cottage to the north has two storeys and three bays, and a hipped roof. Between the cottage and the farmhouse is a single storey smithy range about 30 metres (98 ft) long. The windows are casements.	II
Coach House and Coachman's Lodgings, Wychnor Hall; 52.74902°N 1.76148°W	—	Early 19th century	The building is in red brick on a plinth with bands and a hipped tile roof. There are two storeys and attics, and an H-shaped plan. The windows are casements, and there are three coach entries, all with segmental heads.	II
East Lodge, Wychnor Park (north); 52.74714°N 1.75349°W	—	Early 19th century	The lodge on the north side of the entrance to the drive is in rendered brick on a plinth, and has a hipped slate roof. There are two storeys, and the ends have three-sided bays, with the entrance in the bay facing the road. The windows are sashes.	II
East Lodge, Wychnor Park (south); 52.74689°N 1.75364°W	—	Early 19th century	The lodge on the south side of the entrance to the drive is in rendered brick on a plinth, and has a hipped slate roof. There are two storeys, and the ends have three-sided bays, with the entrance in the bay facing the road. The windows are sashes.	II
Bridge No. 42; 52.74291°N 1.72672°W		Early to mid 19th century	The bridge carries a road over the Trent and Mersey Canal near the A38 road. It is in red brick with stone dressings, and consists of a single elliptical arch. The bridge has a string course, and a stone parapet with flat coping.	II
Game larder, Wychnor Park; 52.74836°N 1.76120°W	—	Mid 19th century	The game larder is in red brick with a slate roof. It has an octagonal plan, and contains a doorway and segmental-headed windows. On the top is a louvred cupola with a finial.	II
