= Wychnor =

Village in Staffordshire, England

Coordinates: 52.743°N 1.739°W

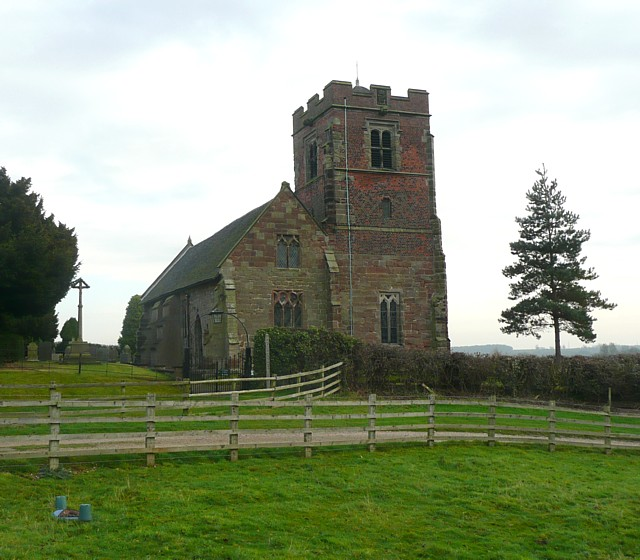
- St Leonard's Church, Wychnor

- Location within Staffordshire
- Population: 70 (2001)
- Civil parish: Wychnor
- District: East Staffordshire
- Shire county: Staffordshire
- Region: West Midlands
- Country: England
- Sovereign state: United Kingdom
- Post town: Burton-on-Trent
- Postcode district: DE13
- UK Parliament: Lichfield

Wychnor (or Wichnor, /ˈwɪtʃnər/) is a village and civil parish in Staffordshire, England. It is situated in the East Staffordshire local government district, adjoining Alrewas and Barton-under-Needwood. It is situated on the formerly Roman road Ryknild Street, currently known as the A38, and contains the hamlet of Wychnor Bridges where the A38 crosses the River Trent. The Trent and Mersey Canal passes through the parish. There is a railway junction nearby: Wychnor Junction where the South Staffordshire Line joins the Cross Country Route.

Its earliest spelling was Hwiccenofre. 'Ofre' was the Anglo-Saxon word for "edge or bank." Hwicce was a province comprising Gloucestershire, Worcestershire and a part of Warwickshire, its people being called Hwiccas or Hwicii. It is thought that some of these people came to settle in Wychnor and so gave their name to the place they settled in. In the Domesday Book, it is referred to as "Wicenore."

The parish also contains Wychnor Park, an 18th-century country house, formerly owned by the Levett Family. In the 2001 census the parish had a population of 70.

== See also ==
- Listed buildings in Wychnor
