= Rohese Giffard =

11th- and 12th-century Norman noblewoman in England

Rohese Giffard (sometimes Rose, or Rohais; died after 1113) was a Norman noblewoman in the late 11th and early 12th century. The daughter of a Norman noble, she was the wife of another Norman noble, Richard fitzGilbert, who was one of the ten wealthiest landholders there after the Norman Conquest. Rohese is mentioned in Domesday Book as a landholder in her own right, something uncommon for women. She and Richard had a number of children, and she lived on past his death around 1086, until at least 1113 when she is recorded giving lands to a monastery. Her descendants eventually inherited her father's lands, although this did not occur until the reign of King Richard I of England (r. 1189–1199).

== Early life ==
Rohese was the daughter of Walter Giffard. Her maternal grandfather was Gerard Fleitel. Walter Giffard was the lord of Longueville-sur-Scie in Upper Normandy.

== Marriage and children ==
Rohese was the wife of Richard fitzGilbert, the son of Gilbert, Count of Brionne, before 1066. After the Norman Conquest of England, fitzGilbert was a leading landowner in England. Domesday Book records him as the eighth-richest landowner in England, with lands centered on two locations—lands in Kent and Surrey grouped around Tonbridge and lands in Essex and Suffolk grouped around Clare. Their children were Roger, Gilbert, Walter, Robert, Richard, Godfrey, Rohais, (Note: Occasionally Rohese.) and Adelisa.

Roger received the Norman lands after fitzGilbert's death, Gilbert received his father's English lands, Walter was given a Welsh lordship by King Henry I of England, and Robert was given lands around London by King Henry I. Richard became a monk at Bec Abbey and was later abbot of Ely Abbey. The last son, Godfrey, is known only from his burial at Clare. Rohais married Eudo Dapifer and Adelisa married Walter Tirel. A daughter of fitzGilbert, who is unnamed, is said to have married Ralph de Fougères, but it is not known whether this refers to another marriage for either Rohais or Adelisa or if this is a third daughter. Some of the children were born before 1066, as a gift to Jumièges Abbey in 1066, mentions the souls of their children.

== Landowner, death, and legacy ==
Rohese occurs in Domesday Book (done in 1086) as a landowner in her own right, one of few women mentioned in that survey. It is not known why she held these lands independently of her husband, as the previous landholders, Robert son of Wimac, and Archbishop Stigand have no obvious relationship with her. They may have been her dower lands although this is not mentioned in Domesday. Domesday often does not mention dower or other conditions of female landholding, due to its emphasis on documenting royal rights.

FitzGilbert died between 1085 and 1087, as his son Gilbert witnesses a charter of King William II of England in 1087. Rohese survived him and was still alive in 1113, when she gave a gift to St Neot's Priory which had been founded as a dependent priory of Bec Abbey in Normandy on Rohese's own manor of Eynesbury. Rohese's descendants eventually were the heirs to the lands held by her father, receiving half the honour of Long Crendon in Buckinghamshire in the reign of King Richard I of England (r. 1189–1199), after the lands and inheritance were originally returned to Richard's father, King Henry II of England (r. 1154–1189).
