= Marshal of the Army of God and the Holy Church =

- Seal of Robert Fitzwalter, first Marshal of the Army of God and the Holy Church
- First Marshal: Robert Fitzwalter
- Last Marshal: Robert Fitzwalter
- Appointer: Elective
- Marshalship began: by 5 May 1215
- Date of Marshalship lapsing: 8 December 1235

The Marshal of the Army of God and the Holy Church was the title displayed from 1215 by Robert Fitzwalter, (Note: Also spelled FitzWalter, fitzWalter, etc.) the leader of the baronial opposition against John, King of England and one of the twenty-five sureties of Magna Carta. He was feudal baron of Little Dunmow, Essex and constable of Baynard's Castle, in London, to which was annexed the hereditary office of castellain and chief banneret of the City of London. He was elected by his fellow barons, and held the title at least from when the rebels armed themselves in Lincolnshire and formally defied King John. He retained the title at least until he received back the custody of Hertford castle in June. He died on 9 December 1235, (Note: However, Charles Lethbridge Kingsford said in his notes on John Stow's A Survey of London that he died in 1234, not 1235.) and is buried in the Priory Church in Little Dunmow.

== Robert I ==
Marshal of the Army of God and the Holy Church Robert Fitzwalter Baron of Little Dunmow, Constable of Baynard's Castle, Castellain and Chief Banneret of the City of London, member of the Security Council of the Barons as enshrined in Magna Carta.

== Marshal of the Army of God and the Holy Church (1215–1235) ==
Seal	House	Name	Marshal from	Marshal until	Reason of title lapsing
	Baron FitzWalter	Robert Fitzwalter	by 5 May 1215	8 December 1235	Unclaimed by son, Sir Walter Fitzwalter

== See also ==
- Robert Fitzwalter
- John, King of England

== Notes ==
Footnotes
