= Richard fitz Gilbert =

Norman lord in England

Richard fitz Gilbert 1st Lord of Clare

Hereditary
- Lord of the Honor of Clare: 1066–1090
- Successor: Gilbert fitz Richard
- Born: Duchy of Normandy, France
- Died: c. 1090
- Buried: St. Neot's Priory, Huntingdonshire, England
- Family: de Clare
- Spouse: Rohese Giffard
- Issue: Walter de Clare, Lord of Nether Gwent; Richard fitz Richard de Clare; Roger fitz Richard de Clare; Gilbert fitz Richard; Robert fitz Richard; Isabel de Clare; Rohese de Clare; Adelize de Clare
- Father: Gilbert, Count of Brionne

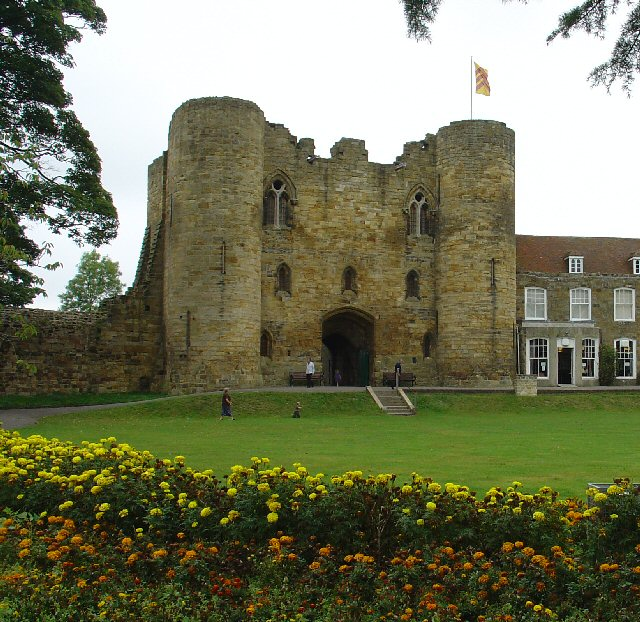
Tonbridge Castle

Richard fitz Gilbert (before 1035–c. 1090), 1st feudal baron of Clare in Suffolk, was a Norman lord who participated in the Norman conquest of England in 1066, and was styled "de Bienfaite", "de Clare", and of "Tonbridge" (Note: Seen in the Domesday book variously as ""de Tonebridge/Tonebrige/Tonbridge") from his holdings.

== Biography ==
Richard was the son of Gilbert, Count of Brionne in Normandy (Fitz was a variant of the Norman filz, French fils: "son of") and Gunnor d'Aunou. Gilbert was a guardian of the young duke William and when Gilbert was killed by Ralph de Wacy in 1040, his two older sons Richard and Gilbert fled to Flanders. On his later return to Normandy, Richard was rewarded with the lordship of Bienfaite and Orbec in Normandy. In 1066, Richard came into England with his kinsman William the Conqueror, and received from him great advancement in honour and possessions.

The Dictionary of National Biography and other sources are vague and sometimes contradictory about when the name de Clare came into common usage, but what we do know is that Richard fitz Gilbert (of Tonbridge), the earliest identifiable progenitor of the family, is once referred to as Richard of Clare in the Suffolk return of the Domesday Book.

== Rewards ==
Richard appears in the Domesday Book as the owner of 176 manors or townships, which had been awarded him by William the Conqueror for his support and participation in the Norman Conquest of 1066. More than ninety of these properties were in Suffolk, including his castle at Clare. Others were in Bedfordshire, Cambridgeshire, Devon, Essex, Kent, Middlesex, Surrey, and Wiltshire.

According to the Genealogia of Tintern Abbey, Richard received Tonbridge in Kent by means of exchange with Lanfranc, Archbishop of Canterbury, who, in turn, received Richard’s holdings in Brionne in Normandy. However, historian Jennifer C. Ward has argued that Tonbridge was awarded to Richard by the Crown.

Some contemporaneous and later sources called Richard Earl of Clare, though many modern sources view the title as a "styled title".

Richard served as joint Chief Justiciar in William's absence, and played a major part in suppressing the revolt of 1075.

== Rebel baron ==
On King William's death, Richard and other great Norman barons, including Odo of Bayeux, Robert, Count of Mortain, and Geoffrey of Coutances, led a rebellion against the rule of William Rufus in order to place Robert Curthose on the throne. However, most Normans in England remained loyal.

== Death and succession ==
Richard retired to a monastery in 1088, passing his possessions in England to his son Gilbert fitz Richard and his land in Normandy to his son Roger Fitz Richard. He was buried in St. Neot's Priory in 1091. His widow was still living in 1113.

== Marriage ==
Richard married Rohese Giffard, daughter of Walter Giffard, Lord of Longueville and Agnes Flaitel, and they had at least the following children:

- Roger fitz Richard de Clare, received Norman lands and d. 1131. Wife unknown, daughter Joanna married Gilbert de Neville.
- Gilbert fitz Richard, d. 1115, succeeded his father as Earl of Clare.
- Walter de Clare, Lord of Nether Gwent, d. 1138.
- Richard fitz Richard de Clare, Abbot of Ely.
- Robert fitz Richard, Lord of Little Dunmow, Baron of Baynard, d. 1136.
- Godfrey
- Alice (or Adeliza) de Clare, d. 1138. m. Walter Tirel.
- Rohese de Clare, d. 1121, m. (ca. 1088), Eudo Dapifer.
- Isabel de Clare, d. 1088, m. Humphrey d'Isle.
- Avice de Clare, m. Robert de Stafford / Tosny.

== Sources ==
- Vaughn, Sally N. (2022). Anselm of Bec and Robert of Meulan: The Innocence of the Dove and the Wisdom of the Serpent. University of California Press.
