= Walter Fitz Robert =

12th-century English nobleman

- Born: c. 1124
- Died: 1198; Essex, England
- Family: de Clare

Walter Fitz Robert of Woodham Walter (Note: Alternately spelled "Walter FitzRobert") (c. 1124–1198), lord of Little Dunmow, Essex, was steward under Stephen of England, having succeeded to that position upon the death of his father, Robert Fitz Richard. Walter died in 1198 and was buried at Little Dunmow, in the choir of the priory of Austin canons.

== Marriage and children ==
Walter Fitz Robert was married twice. Sources conflict as to which of the two wives (Maud de Lucy or Margaret de Bohun, daughter of Humphrey I de Bohun) was the first wife. (Note: Compare and and.) He and Maud de Lucy, daughter of Richard de Luci, had the following children:

- Robert Fitzwalter, a Magna Carta Surety
- Alice Fitz Walter, married Gilbert Peche. His father, Hamon Peche, was sheriff of Cambridgeshire. His mother, Alice Peverel, inherited, with her sisters, the estate of Picot of Cambridge from their father, who was the son of Pain Peverel (standard bearer to Robert Curthose in the Holy Land). The sisters inherited when their only brother, William, died in Jerusalem. Descendants include Elizabeth de Burgh and Dionisie de Munchensi.
- Richard FitzWalter
- Walter FitzWalter
- Maud Fitzwalter

When Robert, and his co-conspirators, fled after being implicated in the 1212 plot against King John, John required that the barons present hostages to show their loyalty. Alice and Gilbert Peche had the same requirement placed against them; one of the hostages was their daughter, Alice.
