= Wychnor Hall =

Country house in Staffordshire, England

Coordinates: 52.7482°N 1.7607°W

Wychnor Park
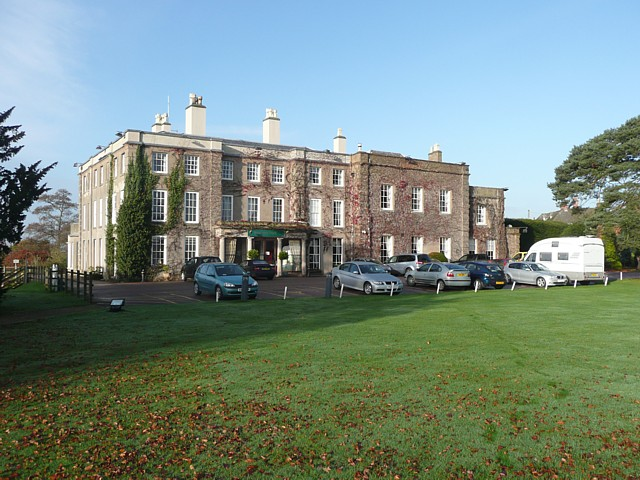
- Wychnor Park

- Location within Staffordshire Location within England

General information
- Location: Staffordshire, England
- Client: The Levett Family

Wychnor Hall (or Wychnor Park, /ˈwɪtʃnər/) is Grade II Listed early 18th-century country house near Burton on Trent, Staffordshire, formerly owned by the Levett Family. The hall has been converted to a Country Club.

== History ==
Wychnor takes its name from the Old English meaning 'village on a bank.' Its earliest spelling was Hwiccenofre. Ofre was the Anglo-Saxon word for "edge or bank". Hwicce was a provence comprising Gloucestershire, Worcestershire and a part of Warwickshire and the people were called Hwiccas or Hwicii. It is thought that some of these people came to settle in Wychnor and so gave their name to the place they settled in.

King James I reportedly stayed at the hall in 1621 and 1624.

The present hall dates from the time of Queen Anne but was much altered and extended in the mid 19th century.

There are a number of curious customs associated with Wychnor, at least one of which was said to have begun with Sir Philip de Somerville, who owned the manor of Wychnor in 1338. A flitch of bacon was kept in the hall that could be claimed by anyone who had been married "for a year and a day without quarrelling or repenting; and that if they were then single, and wished to be married again, the demandant would take the same party before any other in the world." Valid claimants being few and far between, the flitch was replaced by a wooden effigy of same, which continued to hang in the hall for many centuries.

=== Offley family ===
In 1661 Wychnor manor was purchased by Mary Offley, widow of John Offley of Madeley. The estate was inherited by her grandson Crewe Offley. He is said to have rebuilt the hall, but died in 1739. He left his real estate to pay all his debts, apart from a property in Chelsea which his elder son John inherited for three years before it reverted to his younger son. The will also contained provisions to protect the younger son's inheritance from his elder brother. . John Offley had been one of the pupils of Samuel Johnson at Edial Hall near Lichfield, and continued to live at Wychnor after his father's death. By 1756 was keeper of his majesty's private roads, gates and bridges, and conductor or guide to his majesty in his royal progresses. In 1765, he sold Wychnor with every article in the house and on the estate, as it was to John Levett.

=== Levett family ===
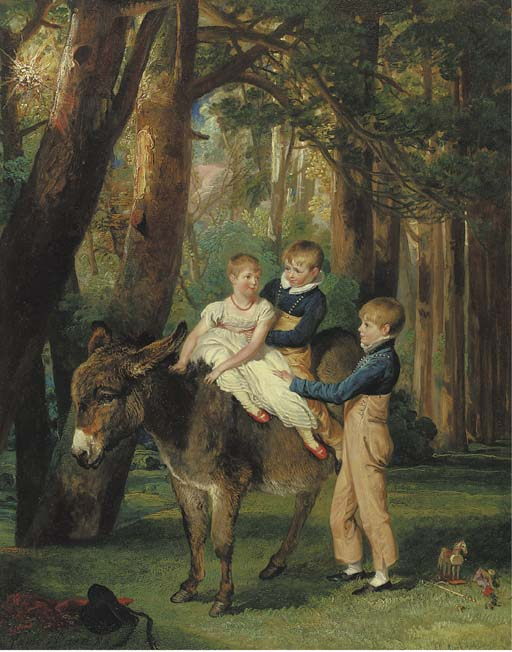
The Levett Children. John, Theophilus and Frances Levett. Portrait by James Ward, RA, Wychnor, Staffordshire, November 1811

John Levett, the son of Lichfield politician Theophilus Levett, purchased Wychnor in 1765. John, a landowner, investor and sometime member of the Lunar Society), was Member of Parliament for Lichfield. Though he died childless, Wychnor remained for many years the home of the Levett family.

John' s nephew Theophilus Levett was Recorder of Lichfield and High Sheriff of Staffordshire in 1809. His friend General William Dyott, Aide-de-camp to King George III, attended Levett's simple funeral at Wychnor and noted that Levett "has left great riches to his younger children with the exception of his son Arthur, to whom he has bequeathed £4,000."

A second John Levett was High Sheriff of Staffordshire in 1846.

Theophilus John Levett, grandson of the Sheriff of the same name, was M.P. for Lichfield from 1880 to 1885.

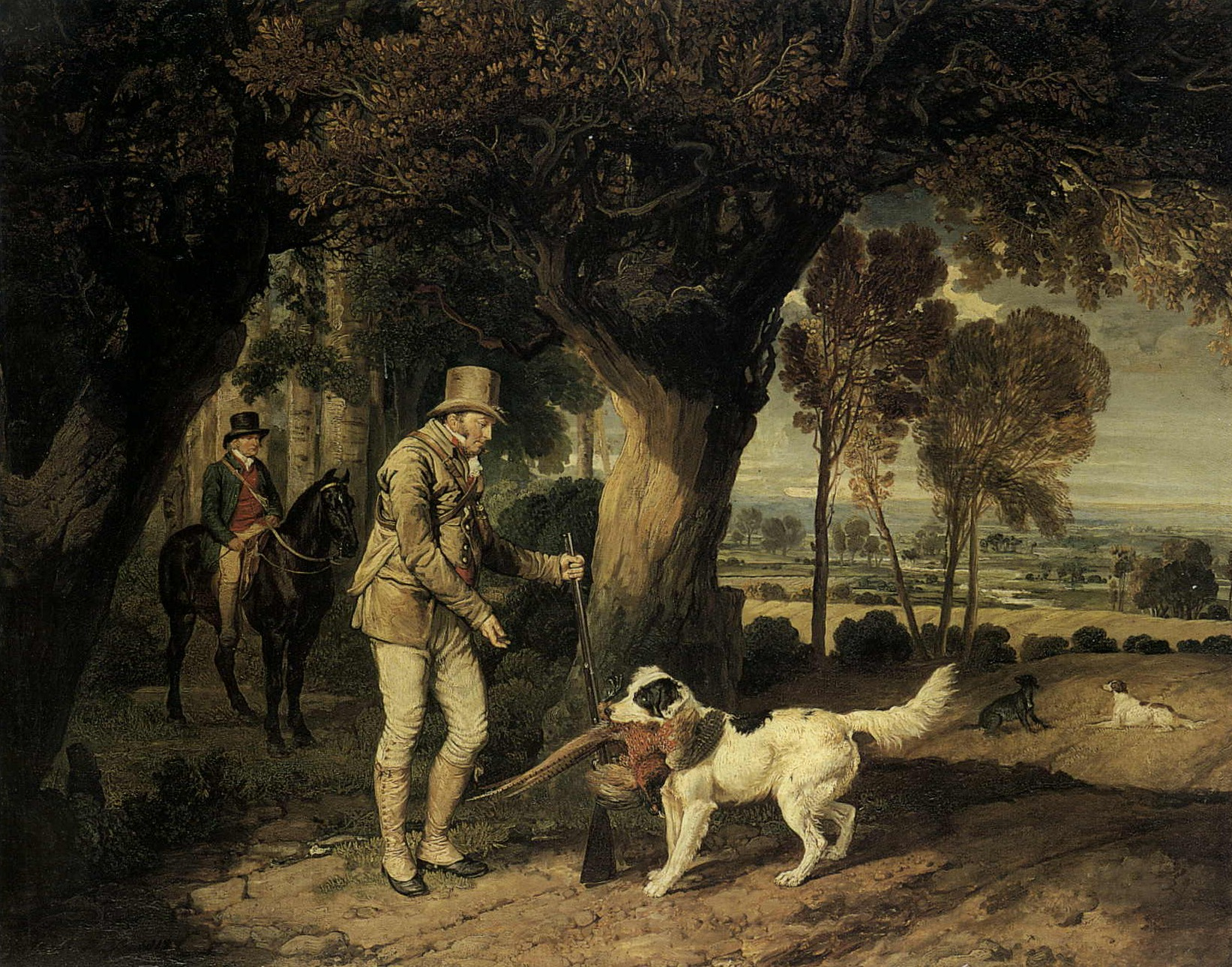
John Levett Receiving Pheasant from Retriever on His Estate at Wychnor, James Ward, R.A., 1812

=== Later history ===
The Levett family held Wychnor Hall until 1913, when it was sold to Lt.-Col. W.E. Harrison, of a family who had mining interests around Cannock, in the West Midlands. The estate was broken up and sold piecemeal in 1976 and the Hall and its immediate grounds passed through various owners, being converted into the Wychnor Park Country Club after 1981.

== See also ==
- Listed buildings in Wychnor
