= Robert Fitz Richard =

11th and 12th-century Norman nobleman in England

- Baron of Little Dunmow
- Born: 1064
- Died: 1136
- Noble family: de Clare
- Spouse: Maud de Senlis
- Issue: Walter Fitz Robert; Maud Fitz Robert
- Father: Richard fitz Gilbert
- Mother: Rohese Giffard

Robert Fitz Richard (1064–1136) was an Anglo-Norman noble.

== Life ==
Robert was the son of Sir Richard FitzGilbert de Clare, Lord of Clare and Tonbridge, and Rohese Giffard, daughter of Sir Walter Giffard, Lord of Longueville.

Robert was steward to English kings Henry I and Stephen of Blois. In 1110, he became a baron after Henry I granted him the village of Little Dunmow, in Essex, forfeited by its previous owner, William Baynard, in the same year. Robert also became constable of Baynard’s Castle, a property that was built buy Ralph Baynard, William’s grandfather.

Around 1114, Robert married Maud de Senlis, daughter of Sir Simon de Senlis, Earl of Northampton, and Maud, Countess Huntingdon. They had two children: Sir Walter FitzRobert (b. c. 1124) and Maud FitzRobert (b. c. 1132). A son of Walter (Robert FitzWalter) and a son of Maud (William d’Aubigny) were surety barons of the Magna Carta.
