= Little Dunmow =

Village in Essex, England

Coordinates: 51.866316°N 0.404606°E

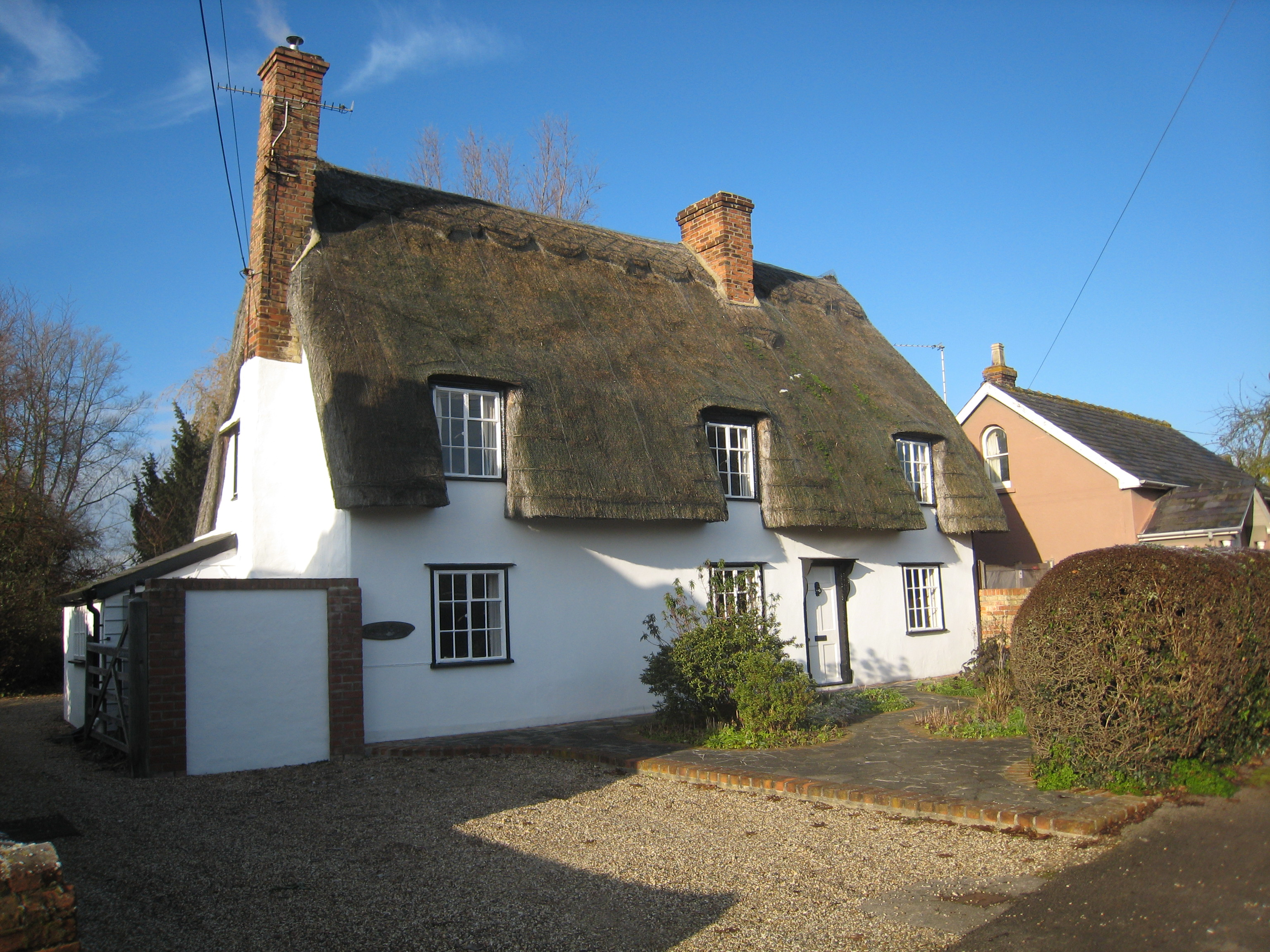
- Thatched cottage

- Location within Essex
- Population: 436 (Parish, 2021)
- OS grid reference: TL655215
- Civil parish: Little Dunmow
- District: Uttlesford
- Shire county: Essex
- Region: East
- Country: England
- Sovereign state: United Kingdom
- Post town: DUNMOW
- Postcode district: CM6
- Police: Essex
- Fire: Essex
- Ambulance: East of England

Little Dunmow is a village and civil parish in the Uttlesford district of Essex, England. It lies in the valley of the River Chelmer about 3 miles (4.8 km) east-southeast of the town of Great Dunmow. At the 2021 census the parish had a population of 436.

The Flitch Way, a linear country park along the route of the old Braintree to Bishop's Stortford railway, links Little Dunmow and the new settlement of Flitch Green, which was formerly in the parish of Little Dunmow but became a separate parish in 2009.

== History ==
=== Early History ===
A Middle Bronze Age settlement was on the site of present-day Tooley's Farm. Excavations culminating in 2025 have discovered ditches, a large circular put, sherds of pottery in a style consistent with the Deverel-Rimbury culture, and various animal remains. Radiocarbon dating suggests these finds were deposited between 1282 and 1053 BC.

The area continued to be inhabited throughout the Iron Age, and later became part of the agricultural hinterland of the Roman settlement at Great Dunmow.

=== Feudal Barony ===
Little Dunmow formed the caput of a feudal barony the first holder of which was Ralph Baynard, as recorded in the Domesday Book of 1086.

Arms adopted by Robert FitzWalter I c.1200 at the start of the age of heraldry: Or, a fess gules between two chevrons of the last. This is a heraldic difference of the arms of de Clare, his cousins.

He was the builder of Baynard's Castle in the City of London and was followed by his son Geoffrey, whose son William rebelled against King Henry I (1100–1135) and thereby forfeited his lands. The barony was re-granted by the king to Robert FitzRichard (d.1134/6), younger son of Richard FitzGilbert de Clare (d.1091), feudal baron of Clare, Suffolk. He was succeeded by his son Walter I (d.1198) who was succeeded by his son Robert FitzWalter I (d.1235), founder of the family of FitzWalter who rebelled against John I as one of the 25 Magna Carta sureties. At his death he left his 16-year-old son Walter FitzWalter (1219–1258) as heir. Walter's son was Robert FitzWalter II (1247–1326). His son was Robert FitzWalter III (d.1328) who was succeeded by his son John FitzWalter (1315–1361).

==== Foundation of Priory ====
The Parish Church was founded in 1104 by Lady Juga Baynard, wife of Ralph Baynard. After her death her son Geoffrey Baynard founded in 1106 an Augustinian priory dedicated to St Mary. One of its canons served as curate to the parish. The majority of the original structure has been lost but the Lady chapel survives and became the east end of the choir of the large and stately Little Dunmow Priory church, now the Parish Church dedicated to St Mary the Virgin. It retains the magnificent columns and beautiful Gothic windows as evidence of its former grandeur. The monastic buildings stood to the southwest of the church but, along with much of the Priory, were razed to the ground after the Dissolution of the Monasteries, when the priory site, with the manors of Little Dunmow and Clopton Hall, were granted to the patron of the priory, Robert Radcliffe, 1st Earl of Sussex.

=== 21st Century ===
The building of a new development, Flitch Green, began in 2001. By 2008 the population of this development far exceeded that of the old village, and in April 2009 Flitch Green became a separate civil parish, under an order made by Uttlesford District Council, but retains Little Dunmow as its postal address. A further development, Chelmer Mead, was proposed in 2007. An original scope of 3,000 houses was shelved after opposition, and subsequent smaller proposals have been refused planning permission.

== Notable buildings ==
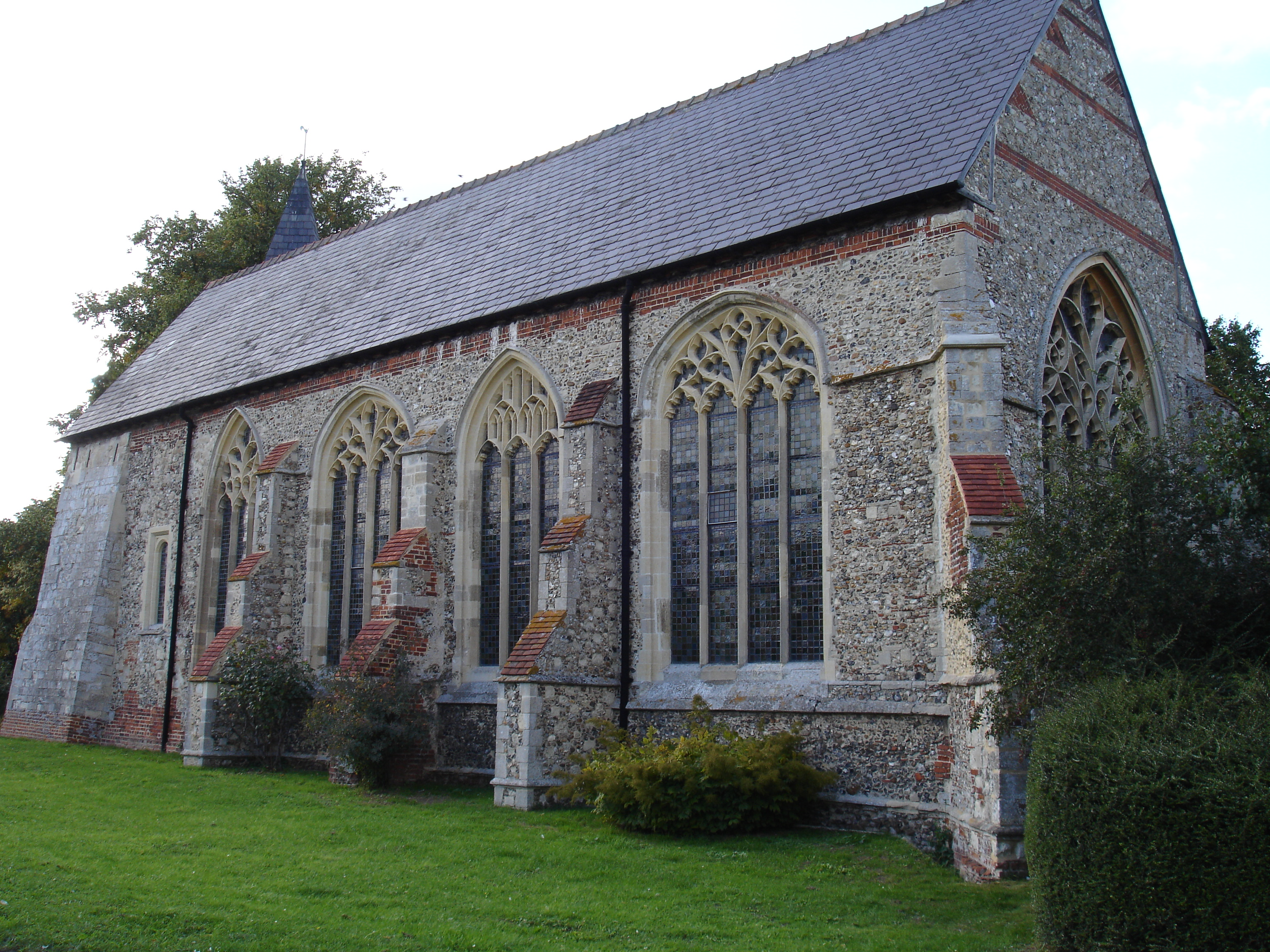
Little Dunmow Priory church (St Mary's)

Many 14th, 15th, 16th and 17th-century buildings may still be found in the village, including Priory Place (on the site of the old Priory), Brick House (beside the footpath to Barnston as it approaches the Chelmer valley), Ivy House (at the junction of The Street and Brook Street, Monks Hall (at the junction of The Street and Grange Lane) and Rose Farm (at the Junction of Grange Lane and the Street). A number of thatched cottages are scattered around the village. The centre of Little Dunmow has a defined conservation area.

== Flitch Trials ==
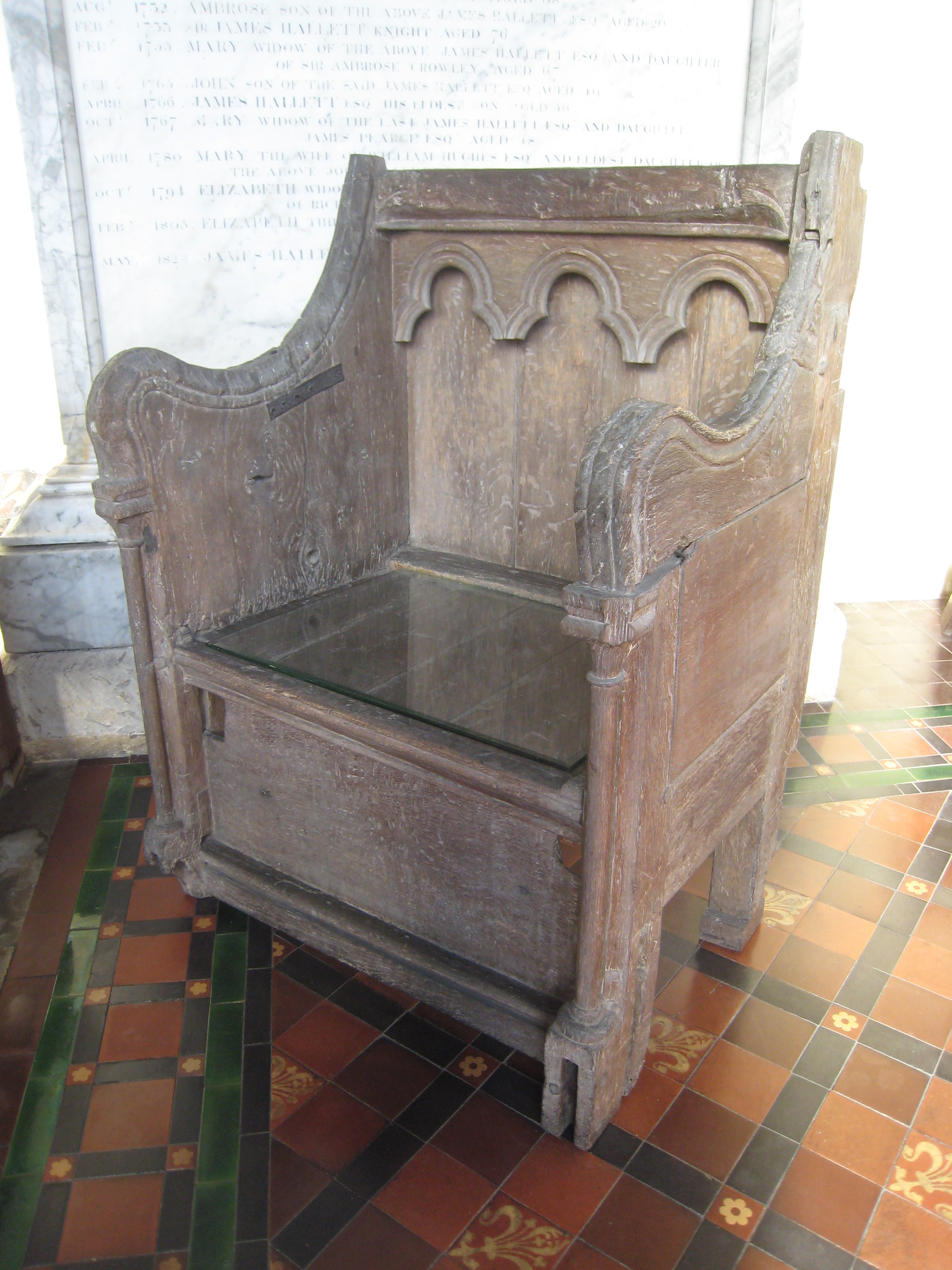
Flitch Chair in St Mary's Church

Little Dunmow was the original home of the Flitch Trials which now take place in Great Dunmow every four years. The ancient Flitch of bacon custom rewarded a couple who had been married in church and remained "unregreted" for a year and a day, with a flitch of bacon. The claimants had to swear an oath kneeling on two sharp pointed stones in the churchyard. They were then carried through the village to be acclaimed. In later years they were carried in the Flitch Chair, thought to be made from pew ends from the priory church. The 15th-century chair can still be seen within the church.

The last recorded priory trial was held in 1751 but the custom was revived in Victorian times following the 1854 publication of the novel The Flitch of Bacon by William Harrison Ainsworth.

== See also ==
- The Hundred Parishes
