= Montfichet's Tower =

Former castle in the City of London

Coordinates: 51°30′49″N 0°6′5″W

- Part of the Fortifications of London
- Ludgate Hill, London

Site information
- Type: Castle, possibly motte-and-bailey

Location
- Location within City of London

Site history
- Built: late 11th century
- Demolished: 1213

Montfichet's Tower (also known as Montfichet's Castle and/or spelt Mountfitchet's or Mountfiquit's) was a Norman fortress on Ludgate Hill in London, between where St Paul's Cathedral and City Thameslink railway station now stand. First documented in the 1130s, it was probably built in the late 11th century. The defences were strengthened during the revolt of 1173–1174 against Henry II.

It was demolished in 1213 by King John and the site sold in 1275 to build the great Dominican priory of Blackfriars. Archaeological excavations in 1986–90 uncovered waste pits and the remains of ditches between Carter Lane and Ludgate Hill.

== Background ==
Today the River Fleet has been reduced to a trickle in a culvert under New Bridge Street that emerges under Blackfriars Bridge, but before the development of London it was the biggest river in the area, after the Thames. It formed the western boundary of the Roman city of London and the strategic importance of the junction of the Fleet and the Thames means that the area was probably fortified from early times.

The Normans reinforced the area by building two castles inside the Roman walls that ran north–south, giving their name to the street of Old Bailey and then roughly following the modern Blackfriars Lane down to the Thames. Baynard's Castle was built where the wall met the river overlooking the mouth of the Fleet, roughly where the Bank of New York's Mellon Centre stands at 160 Queen Victoria Street. Montfichet's Tower was further north on Ludgate Hill overlooking the strategic route west, through Ludgate and over the Fleet, that would become Fleet Street.

== Construction ==
Little is known about the construction of Montfichet's Tower. The first documentary evidence is a reference to the lord of Montfichet's Tower in a charter of c1136 in relation to river rights. The tower was probably built in the late 11th century; the name appears to derive from the Montfitchet family from Stansted Mountfitchet in Essex, who occupied the tower in the 12th century. A William Mountfichet lived during the reign (1100–1135) of Henry I and witnessed a charter for the sheriffs of London. The 16th-century historian John Stow ascribes construction to a Baron of Mountfichet, who came to England during the Norman Conquest – Montfiquet is a village in Normandy between Bayeux and Saint-Lô. The family built Stansted Mountfitchet Castle at Stansted Mountfitchet, which has now been recreated as a tourist attraction; the two castles are easily confused, particularly given the variable spelling of Montfichet/Mountfitchet in documents.

The last mention of the tower as a place of military significance comes in Jordan Fantosme's chronicle of the revolt of 1173–1174 against Henry II. Fantosme relates how Gilbert de Munfichet (sic) strengthened his castle in London and become allies with "Clarreaus" – identified as his cousin Walter Fitz Robert of Baynard's Castle, grandson of the Lord of Clare.

== King John ==
Robert Fitzwalter of Baynard's Castle was the leader of the barons' revolt against King John which culminated in Magna Carta in 1215. Fitzwalter plotted against King John in 1212, but John got wind of the plot and exiled Fitzwalter. Fitzwalter fled to France and on 14 January 1213 King John destroyed Castle Baynard. Stow reports that Robert Montfichet was also banished in 1213 and at least one of the Montfichet castles was demolished.

Fitzwalter was forgiven under the terms of the king's submission to Pope Innocent III in May 1213. His estates were restored on 19 July 1213 and according to Stow he was given licence to repair Castle Baynard. It is not clear to what extent either castle was rebuilt after 1213, or indeed whether the sites were amalgamated in some way. The tower was certainly in ruins by 1278, according to a deed drawn up between the Bishop of London, the Dean and Chapter of St Paul's and the Dominicans about the proposed locations of the new friary church.

== Blackfriars priory ==
In 1275 Fitzwalter's grandson, also called Robert, was given licence to sell Baynard's Castle to Robert Kilwardby, the Archbishop of Canterbury for the precinct of the great Dominican Priory at Blackfriars that started construction in 1276. Montfichet's Tower was included in the sale. The building of the priory required the Roman walls to be rerouted in 1282, and the military functions of the castles were taken up by a new "tower" in the river at the end of the walls. Started under the great castle-builder Edward I, it was completed during the reign of Edward II (1307–1327) and demolished in 1502.

The Bishop of London had first pick of the stones for the 'New Work' (1256–1314) reconstructing Old St Paul's Cathedral. The remainder were used in the construction of the new priory church.

== Archaeology ==
The deed of 1278 mentioned above provides the best documentary evidence for the location of Montfichet's Tower. It makes it clear that the tower was between Ludgate and the river, inside the line of the city walls. Baynard's Castle lay to the south, adjacent to St. Andrew-by-the-Wardrobe. A 1980s study of the topography of medieval London suggested a location bounded by Ludgate Hill and Carter Lane to the north and south, and St Paul's deanery and the city wall to the east and west respectively. Redevelopment gave the Department of Urban Archaeology of the Museum of London the opportunity to excavate the area, between 1986 and 1990.

They found two ditches running east–west on the north side of Carter Lane, between 52–66, interpreted as the southern defences of the tower. There was 10 metres (33 ft) of an earlier ditch, estimated at 2 metres (6.6 ft) deep originally, and 41 metres (135 ft) of a later, V-shaped ditch that was about 16 metres (52 ft) wide and 5 metres (16 ft) deep originally. Another ditch was found on Ludgate Hill, some 30 metres (98 ft) north of the southern ditches. It was estimated at 6.8 metres (22 ft) wide and 3 metres (10 ft) deep originally. Pits and a well were found between the ditches, interpreted as the bailey of the castle, but no sign of a keep or other masonry. Watson suggests that a motte and keep may have existed to the east of the Ludgate Hill entrance of Ludgate Square.

== See also ==
- Baynard's Castle
- Fortifications of London
- Norman and Medieval London
- Tower of London
