= Stansted Mountfitchet =

Village in Essex, England

Coordinates: 51.898°N 0.198°E

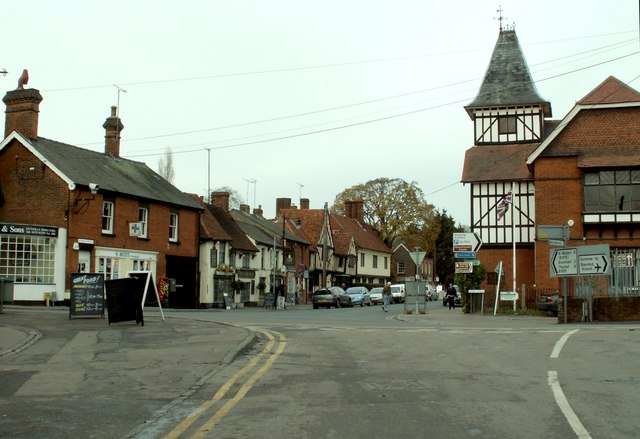
- Stansted Mountfitchet

- Location within Essex
- Population: 8,691 (Parish, 2021); 8,625 (Built up area, 2021)
- OS grid reference: TL5124
- Civil parish: Stansted Mountfitchet
- District: Uttlesford
- Shire county: Essex
- Region: East
- Country: England
- Sovereign state: United Kingdom
- Post town: STANSTED
- Postcode district: CM24
- Dialling code: 01279
- Police: Essex
- Fire: Essex
- Ambulance: East of England
- UK Parliament: North West Essex

Stansted Mountfitchet, commonly known as Stansted, is a village and civil parish in the Uttlesford district of Essex, England. It lies 35 miles (56 km) north-east of London. It gives its name to London Stansted Airport, which is 2 miles (3 km) south-east from the village centre. The village is served by Stansted Mountfitchet railway station.

The village is situated in north-west Essex, near the county boundary with Hertfordshire and 3 miles (5 km) north of Bishop's Stortford. At the 2021 census the parish had a population of 8,691 and the built up area had a population of 8,625.

== Toponymy ==
The name "Stansted" is Old English for stony place. The Mountfitchet name comes from its owners after the Norman Conquest of 1066, to distinguish it from other places called Stansted or Stanstead, such as Stanstead Abbotts 11 miles (18 km) to the south-west in Hertfordshire, or Stansted, Kent.

Stansted Mountfitchet is the legal name of the parish, and Stansted Mountfitchet is also used by the Office for National Statistics as the name for the built up area. In official postal addresses, the Royal Mail calls the village just "Stansted" rather than "Stansted Mountfitchet".

== History ==
Stansted was a Saxon settlement, which predated the Norman conquest. In the 1086 Domesday Book, Stansted was in the ancient hundred of Uttlesford. It was one of many villages and manors controlled by the powerful Robert Gernon de Montfichet (from Montfiquet in Calvados, Normandy). His elder son was William de Montfichet. By 1290, Stansted began to be referred to as Stansted Mountfitchet. A small remnant of his castle remains, around which a reconstruction of an early Norman castle has been built. Believed to have been fortified originally in the Iron Age, and subsequently by the Romans and Vikings, construction of the Norman castle began in 1066. Lord Mountfitchet is also considered the 11th-century builder of Montfichet's Tower in London, demolished in 1213.

St Mary the Virgin's Church, built in the 1120s, is a redundant church under the care of the Churches Conservation Trust. The brick west tower was added in 1692. A chapel of ease dedicated to Saint John the Evangelist was built in 1889 nearer the centre of the village and is now the village church. Stansted Hall was built in 1871 by William Fuller Maitland (d. 1876).

== Folklore ==
In a nineteenth-century account from Stansted Mountfitchet, a shepherd cursed his task aloud, wishing the Devil would set up his sheepfold for him. The Devil appeared, accepted the bargain, and began building it magically. The shepherd narrowly escaped being trapped inside.

== Landmarks ==
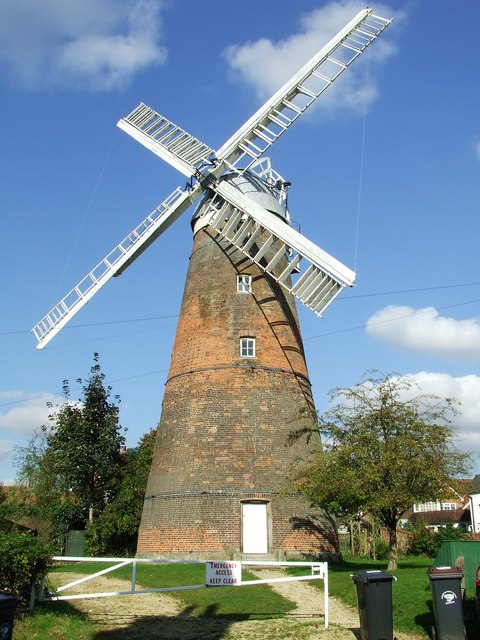
Stansted Mountfitchet Windmill

Other village attractions include the House on the Hill Toy Museum, which its owners claim "is the largest toy museum in the World". Located next to Mountfitchet Castle and Norman Village of 1066, both attractions are owned by Alan Goldsmith. The museum opened in 1991 and holds over 80,000 toys, mostly from the 1950s to the 1990s. A working windmill built in 1787 is in the village, and is open to the public once a month.

During the Second World War, the US Air Force constructed an airfield near the village. After the war ended, it was subsequently taken over by the government and developed as a commercial airport. Today, London Stansted Airport is accessible by road from Junction 8 of the M11 motorway, near Bishop's Stortford and direct by train from London Liverpool Street on the Stansted Express which is run by Greater Anglia. The airport complex straddles the three civil parishes of Stansted Mountfitchet, Elsenham and Takeley, with the main passenger facilities being in Takeley parish.

== Economy ==
In March 2013, Stansted Mountfitchet was named as the UK's fourth most internet-friendly town. The Google eTown Awards recognise the top places where businesses are most actively embracing the web and Stansted's high ranking reflects the increased use of the internet to spur economic growth. The results put Stansted in fourth place behind Richmond, in third, Edinburgh, in second, and Stratford upon Avon, which took the top spot.

Titan Airways has its head office in Enterprise House on the property of Stansted Airport. Several defunct airlines had their head offices on the Stansted property. AirUK (later KLM uk) had its head office in Stansted House. Buzz had its head office in Endeavour House. AB Airlines had its head office in Enterprise House. Lloyd International Airways had its head office at Lloyd House. Go Fly had its head office at Enterprise House.

Until it merged with Lastminute.com in 2006, Travelocity.co.uk had its headquarters in Stansted Mountfitchet and employed around 60 Essex and Hertfordshire locals. The office closed in the early part of 2006 and Travelocity.co.uk formally came under the umbrella of Lastminute.com, which has offices in London and Woking, Surrey.

== Governance ==
There are three tiers of local government covering Stansted Mountfitchet, at parish, district, and county level: Stansted Mountfitchet Parish Council, Uttlesford District Council, and Essex County Council. The parish council is based at the Mountfitchet Exchange at 72 Chapel Hill.

== Transportation Services ==
Stansted Mountfitchet is connected with many different transportation routes whether by bus, train or aeroplane. Stansted Mountfitchet railway station connects Stansted Mountfitchet with London Liverpool Street, Cambridge, Ely and Stansted Airport. Stansted Mountfitchet train station consists of 2 platforms, platform 1 and platform 2. Stansted Mountfitchet is served by 4 major bus routes: 7, 7A, 510 and 301. 301 connects Saffron Walden with Bishops Stortford via Stansted Mountfitchet. 510 connects London Stansted Airport with Harlow via Stansted Mountfitchet, Bishops Stortford and Sawbridgeworth. 7/7A connects Stansted Airport and Bishops Stortford via Stansted Mountfitchet. London Stansted Airport operates both domestic and international flights. The airport is located approximately 5 miles south-east of Stansted Mountfitchet.

== Population ==
At the 2021 census the parish had a population of 8,691 and the Stansted Mountfitchet built up area as defined by the Office for National Statistics had a population of 8,625.

The population of the parish had been 5,533 at the 2001 census, increasing to 6,011 at the 2011 census.

== Sport and leisure ==
Non-League football club Stansted F.C. (winners of the FA Vase in 1983-84) play at the Hargrave Park sports ground in the village and there is also a cricket club based at the ground.

== Notable people ==
- Actor James Frain was raised in Stansted Mountfitchet.
- Munroe Bergdorf, model and activist.
- Kate Johnson, novelist, was raised in Stansted Mountfitchet.
- Peter Whiteley (Royal Marines officer) was born and raised in Stansted Mountfitchet

== See also ==
- The Hundred Parishes
