= Ringwork =

Type of early castle

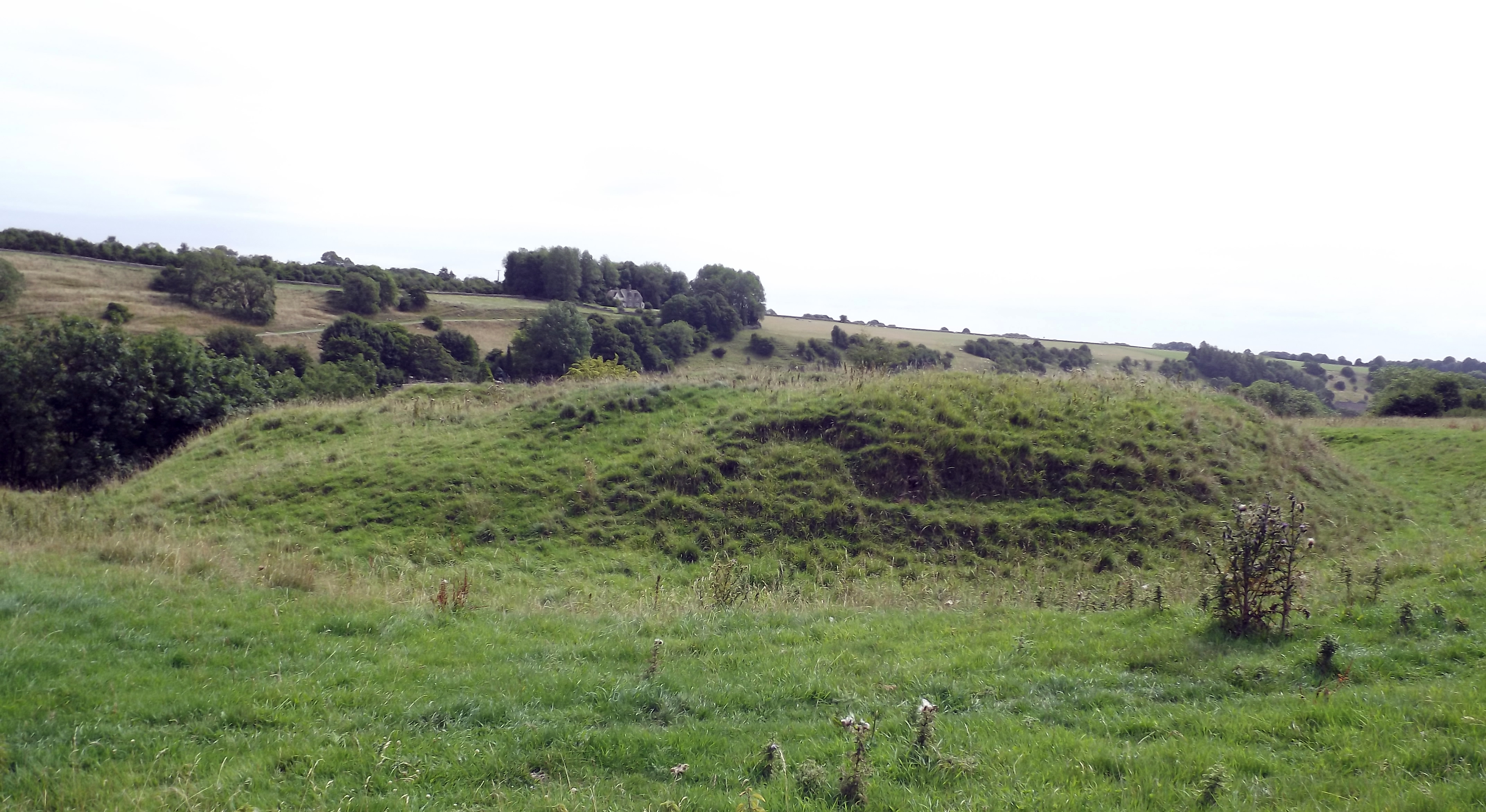
Surviving earthworks of the ringwork at Newington Bagpath in Gloucestershire

A ringwork is a form of fortified defensive structure, usually circular or oval in shape. Ringworks are essentially motte-and-bailey castles without the motte. Defences were usually earthworks in the form of a ditch and bank surrounding the site.

Ringworks originated in Germany in the 10th century as an early form of medieval castle and at first were little more than a fortified manor house. They appeared in England just prior to the Norman conquest and large numbers were built during the late 11th and early 12th centuries. More elaborate versions (such as Stansted Mountfitchet Castle) comprise a ringwork and bailey, the ringwork replacing the more usual motte and the bailey acting as a military stronghold.

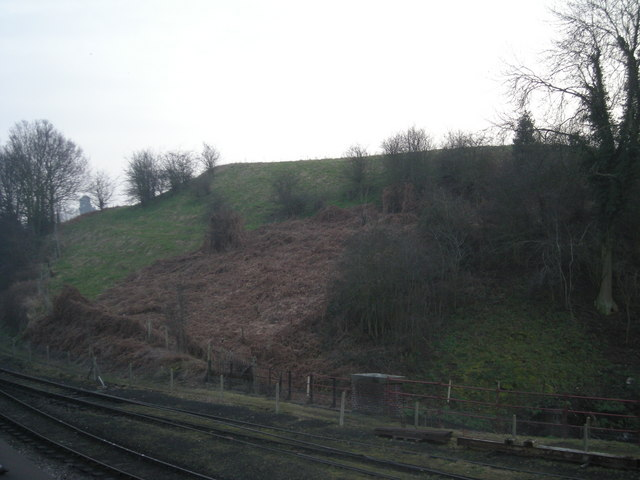
Surviving ringwork of Panpudding Hill, in Bridgnorth, Shropshire

A survey published in 1969 identified 198 ringwork castles in England and Wales, with a further 50 sites that were considered to possibly be ringworks. D. J. Cathcart King and Leslie Alcock proposed the following classification of ringworks based on their surviving remains:

- A – a bank and ditch encircling the site
- B – a bank and ditch encircling the site, with an artificially raising interior
- Bb – a bank and ditch encircling the site on a natural hillock, where the ground surface slopes so that the interior is higher than the exterior
- C – a bank on one side with sloping ground on the other
- D – a bank on one side with sloping ground on the other combined with a ditch and an artificially raised interior
- Dd – a bank on one side with sloping ground on the other combined with a ditch and the interior raised by a natural hillock

== See also ==
- Circular rampart – Embankment built in the shape of a circle
- Ringfort – Circular fortified settlements found in Northern Europe
