= Baynard's Castle =

Buildings on two neighbouring sites in London

Coordinates: 51°30′41″N 0°6′0″W

- Part of the Fortifications of London
- Blackfriars, London, England
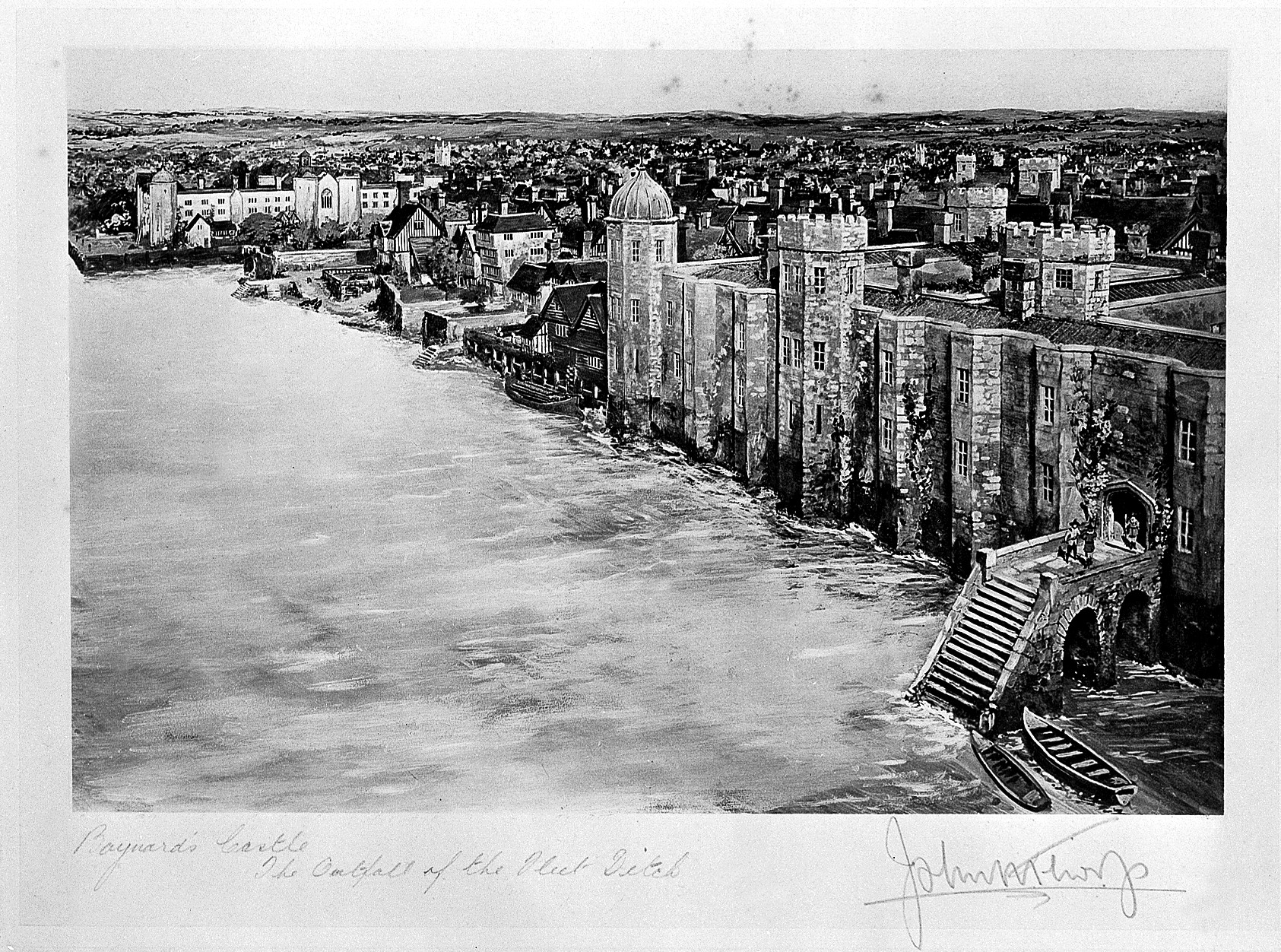
- The first Baynard's Castle

Site information
- Type: Castle, later mansion

Location
- Location within City of London

Site history
- Built: Before 1017
- Materials: stone
- Demolished: 1666

Garrison information
- Occupants: English royalty

Baynard's Castle refers to buildings on two neighbouring sites in the City of London, between where Blackfriars station and St. Paul's Cathedral now stand. The first was a Norman fortification constructed by Ralph Baynard (fl. 1086), 1st feudal baron of Little Dunmow in Essex, and was demolished by King John in 1213. The second was a medieval palace built a short distance to the south-east and later extended, but mostly destroyed in the Great Fire of London in 1666. According to Sir Walter Besant, "There was no house in [London] more interesting than this".

The original castle was built at the point where the old Roman walls and River Fleet met the River Thames, just east of what is now Blackfriars Station. The north wall of the castle used as its foundation the Roman-era river wall from the 3rd century, distinguished by a tile-course of Roman brick. The Norman castle stood for over a century before being demolished by King John in 1213. It appears to have been rebuilt after the Barons' Revolt, but the site was sold in 1276 to form the precinct of the great Blackfriars' Monastery.

About a century later, a new mansion was constructed on land that had been reclaimed from the Thames, south-east of the first castle. The house was rebuilt after 1428, and became the London headquarters of the House of York during the Wars of the Roses. The accession of King Edward IV was agreed and proclaimed in the castle on 3 March 1461.

The house was reconstructed as a royal palace by King Henry VII (1485–1509) at the end of the 15th century, and his son Henry VIII gave it to Katherine of Aragon on the eve of their wedding. In 1551, after Henry's death in 1547 and during the reign of King Edward VI, the house was granted to William Herbert, 1st Earl of Pembroke (1501–1570), brother-in-law of Henry's widow, Queen Katherine Parr. Pembroke built a large extension around a second courtyard in about 1551. The Herbert family took the side of Parliament in the English Civil War, and after the 1660 Restoration of the Monarchy the house was occupied by Francis Talbot, 11th Earl of Shrewsbury, a Royalist. Baynard's Castle was left in ruins after the Great Fire of London in 1666, although fragments survived into the 19th century. The site is now occupied by a BT office called Baynard House and the castle is commemorated by Castle Baynard Street and the Castle Baynard Ward of the City of London.

== Norman castle ==
Today the River Fleet has been reduced to a trickle in a culvert under New Bridge Street that emerges under Blackfriars Bridge, but before the modern development of London it was the largest river in the area after the Thames. It formed the western boundary of the Roman city of London, and the strategic importance of the junction of the Fleet and the Thames means that the area was probably fortified from early times.

Richard of Cirencester suggests that King Canute spent Christmas at such a fort in 1017, where he had Eadric Streona executed. Some accounts claim this was triggered by an argument over a game of chess; Historian William Page suggests that Eadric held the fort as Ealdorman of Mercia and after his death it may have been granted to Osgod Clapa, who was a "staller", a standard-bearer and representative of the king (see Privileges section).

This fort was apparently rebuilt after the 1066 Norman Conquest of England by Ralph Baynard, a follower of William the Conqueror and Sheriff of Essex. It was on the river-bank inside the Roman walls; a second Norman fort, Montfichet's Tower, stood 70 metres (230 ft) to the north.

The site of Baynard's Castle was adjacent to the church of St. Andrew-by-the-Wardrobe, on the southern side of today's 160 Queen Victoria Street (the former Times office and now The Bank of New York Mellon Centre); archaeologists have found fortifications stretching at least 50 metres (160 ft) south, onto the site of the proposed development at 2 Puddle Dock. This may be the Bainiardus mentioned in the Domesday Book of 1086 who gave his name to springs near Paddington called Baynard's Watering, later shortened to Bayswater.

The castle was inherited by Ralph Baynard's son Geoffrey and his grandson William Baynard, but the latter forfeited his lands early in the reign of Henry I (1100–1135) for having supported Henry's brother Robert Curthose in his claim to the throne. After a few years in the hands of the king, the castle passed to Eustace, Count of Boulogne, by 1106. John Stow gives 1111 as the date of forfeiture.

Later in Henry's reign, the feudal barony of Little Dunmow and the soke of Baynard's Castle were granted to the king's steward, Robert Fitz Richard (1064–1136), younger son of Richard fitz Gilbert de Clare (d. c. 1090), 1st feudal baron of Clare in Suffolk, near Dunmow. The soke was coterminous with the parish of St. Andrew-by-the-Wardrobe, which was adjacent to the Norman castle; the soke roughly corresponds to the present Castle Baynard ward of the City of London. Both Little Dunmow and Baynard's Castle were eventually inherited by his grandson, Robert Fitzwalter (d. 1234).

== Fitzwalter and the barons' revolt ==
Fitzwalter was the leader of the barons' revolt against King John, which culminated in the Magna Carta of 1215. The Chronicle of Dunmow relates that King John desired Fitzwalter's daughter, Matilda the Fair (also known as Maid Marian Fitzwalter—the real-life Maid Marian of the legend of Robin Hood) and Fitzwalter was forced to take up arms to defend the honour of his daughter.

This romantic tale may well be propaganda giving legitimacy to a rebellion prompted by Fitzwalter's reluctance to pay tax or some other dispute. He plotted with the Welsh prince Llywelyn ab Iorwerth and Eustace de Vesci of Alnwick Castle in 1212. John got wind of the plot and exiled Fitzwalter and de Vesci, who fled to France and Scotland, respectively. On 14 January 1213 John destroyed Castle Baynard.

Fitzwalter was forgiven under the terms of the King's submission to Pope Innocent III in May 1213. His estates were restored on 19 July 1213 and according to Stow he was given licence to repair Castle Baynard and his other castles.

It is not clear to what extent the castle was rebuilt, but in 1275 Robert FitzWalter, 1st Baron FitzWalter (Fitzwalter's grandson), was given licence to sell the site to Robert Kilwardby, Archbishop of Canterbury, to serve as the precinct of the great Dominican Priory at Blackfriars built in 1276. Montfichet's Tower was included in the sale, having also been destroyed by King John in 1213.

Building of the priory required a section of the City Wall to be repositioned and the former military functions of the castle were taken up by a new "tower" in the river at the end of the wall. Started under the great castle-builder King Edward I (1272–1307), it was completed during the reign of his son Edward II (1307–1327) and was demolished in 1502. This was probably the tower of "Legate's Inn" given by Edward III to William de Ros.

== Privileges ==
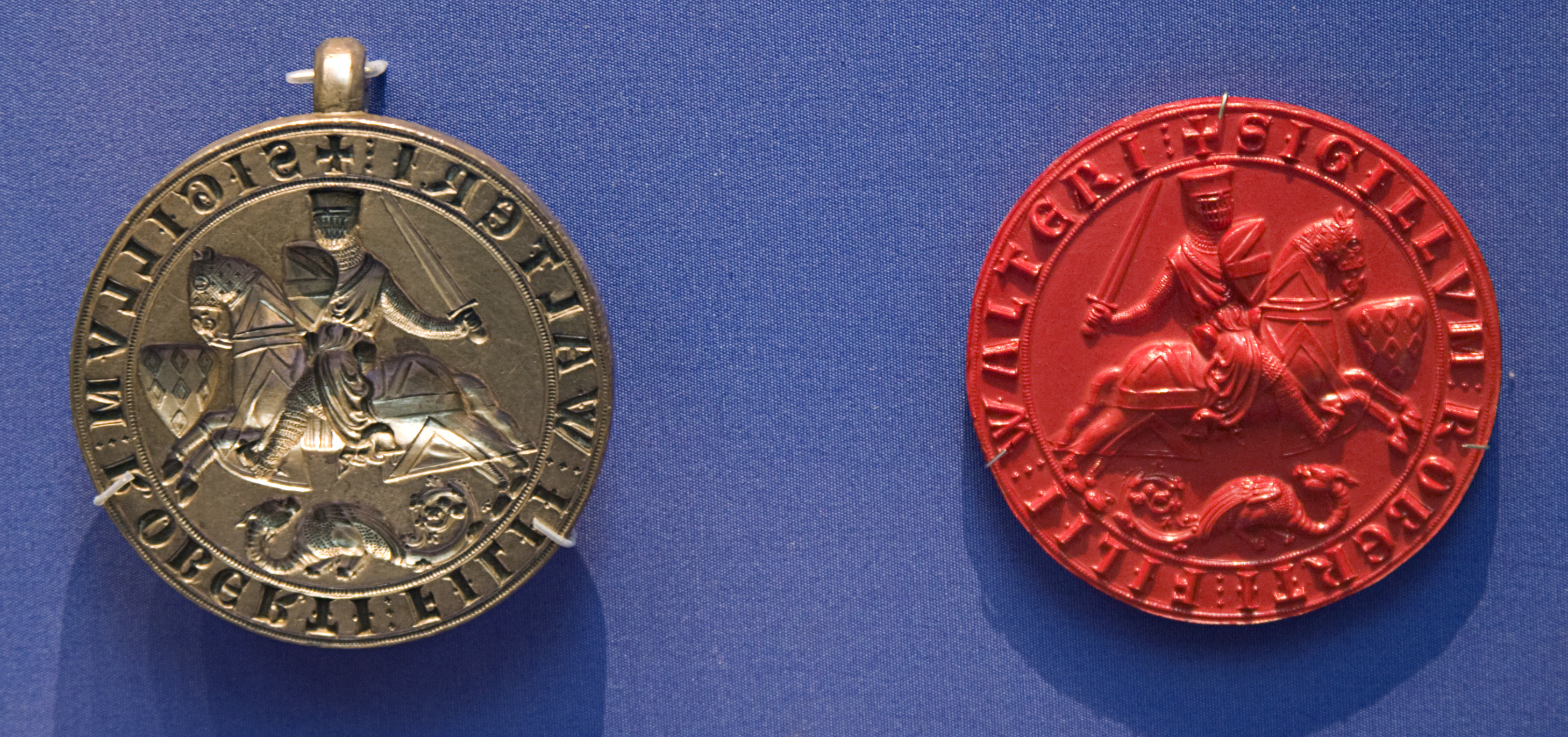
Seal of Robert Fitzwalter

The lord of Castle Baynard appears to have had held a special place among the nobility of London. Robert Fitzwalter explicitly retained all the franchises and privileges associated with the lordship of Baynard when he made the sale. He claimed them in 1303, his son Robert tried again before the King's Justices in 1327 and his brother John FitzWalter tried again in 1347 in front of the Lord Mayor of London and Common Council, all without success.

These law-suits centred on a claim to be the "Chief Banneret" of London. Created in the reign of Edward I (1272–1307), knights banneret led troops into battle under their own banner not that of a feudal superior. It seems that the tenure of Castle Baynard had entitled FitzWalter's ancestors to carry the banner of the City of London, and hence be leaders of the London forces. In 1136 Robert Fitz Richard had claimed the "lordship of the Thames" from London to Staines, as the king's banner-bearer and as guardian of the whole City of London.

In times of peace, the soke of Castle Baynard held a court which sentenced criminals convicted before the Lord Mayor at the Guildhall, and maintained a prison and stocks. Traitors were tied to a post at Wood Wharf and were drowned as the tide overwhelmed them. Fitzwalter was invited to the Court of Privilege, held at the Great Council in the Guildhall, sitting next to the Lord Mayor making pronouncements of all judgments. This may represent a combination of the post-Conquest Anglo-Norman roles of feudal constable and local justiciar with the ancient Anglo-Saxon office of staller. The latter was the king's standard-bearer in war who was his spokesman at the Danish thing, the 11th-century governing assembly.

== New site ==
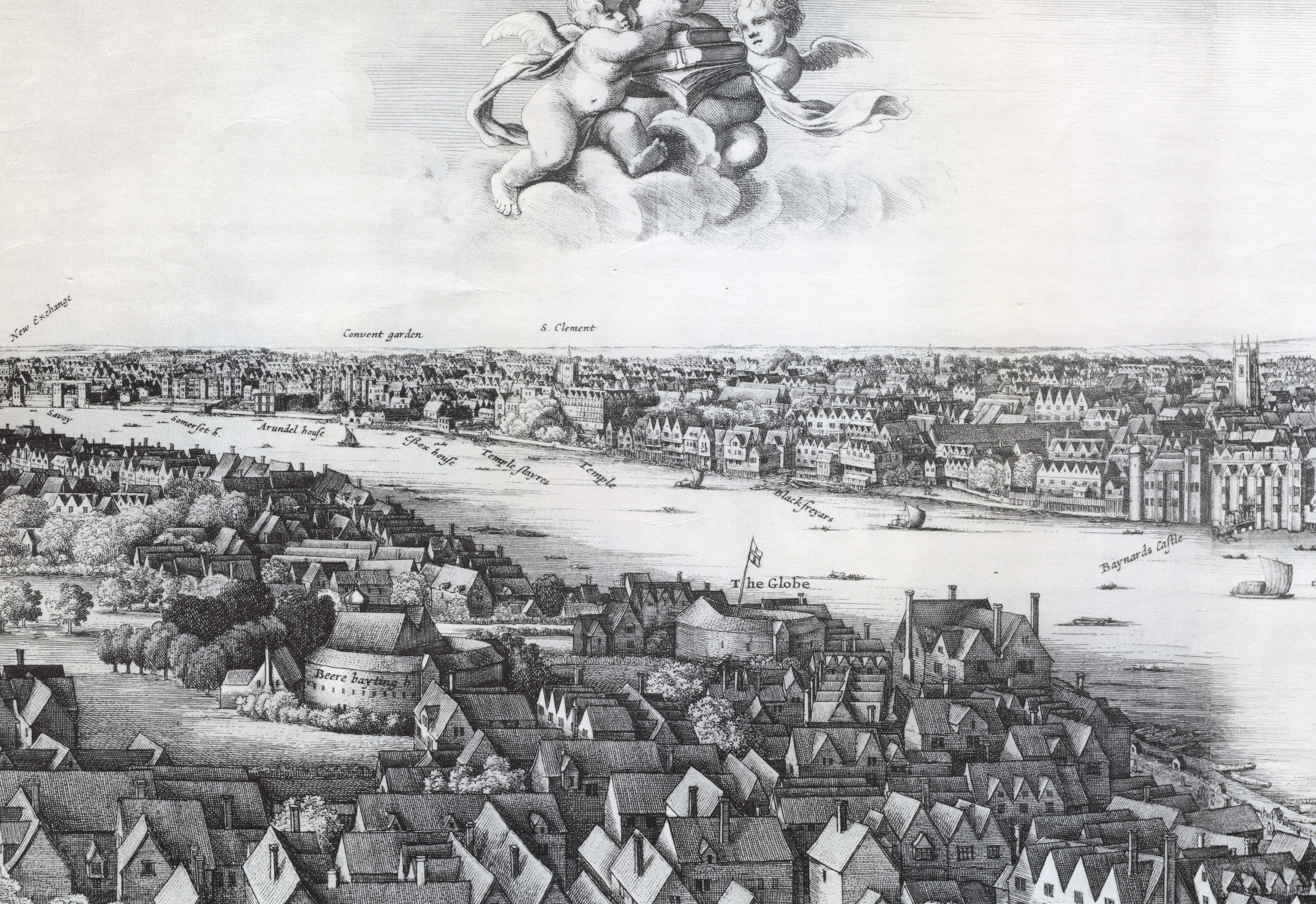
Long View of London from Bankside, detail from a 1647 engraving by Wenceslaus Hollar. Baynard's Castle is at far right, on the far side (north side) of the River Thames, with the Church of St. Andrew-by-the-Wardrobe behind it. The Blackfriars is a short distance upstream at left.

A "Hospice called le Old Inne by Pauls Wharfe" is listed in the possessions of Edward of Norwich, 2nd Duke of York, who was killed at the Battle of Agincourt in 1415. He may have acquired the house by his marriage to Philippa de Mohun, widow of Walter Fitzwalter (d. 1386).

A declaration of 1446 appears to identify this building with a town-house built on land reclaimed from the river, 100 metres (110 yd) south-east of the original castle. Humphrey, Duke of Gloucester, rebuilt the house after a "great fire" in 1428, with four wings in a trapezoidal shape around a courtyard. Excavations have shown that the Roman riverside wall, on the south side of the medieval Thames Street, formed the foundation of the north wall of the new house. It seems that the nearby waterfront was known as Baynard's Castle even after the original castle was destroyed, and the name was transferred to the building on the new site.

Gloucester died within days of being arrested for treason in 1447. The house was forfeited to the crown before being occupied at some time before 1457 by Edward's nephew Richard Plantagenet, 3rd Duke of York, the former Lord Protector, who kept 400 gentlemen and men-at-arms at the castle in his pursuit of his claim to the throne; he was killed at the Battle of Wakefield in 1460.

This London powerbase allowed York's son to be crowned as King Edward IV in the great hall of the castle, whilst Henry VI and Margaret of Anjou were campaigning in northern England. Edward gave the castle to his mother Cecily Neville on 1 June 1461, a few weeks before his coronation, and he housed his family there for safety before the decisive Battle of Barnet.

After the young princes Edward V and his brother Richard were declared illegitimate in 1483 and imprisoned in the Tower of London, never to be seen again, Edward IV's brother was offered the crown as King Richard III at Baynard's Castle, as recounted in Shakespeare's play Richard III. His coronation took place at Westminster Abbey on 6 July 1483.

== Tudors ==
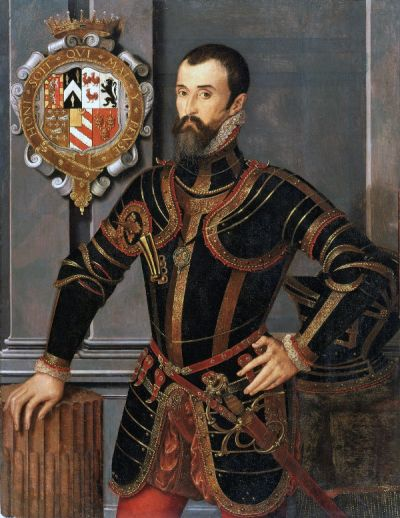
William Herbert, 1st Earl of Pembroke (1501–1570), owned the castle when Mary I was proclaimed Queen there in 1553.

In 1501 King Henry VII "repayred or rather new builded this house, not imbattoled, or so strongly fortified castle like, but farre more beautiful and commodious for the entertainement of any prince or greate estate" (Stow). Henry's alterations included five projecting towers between two existing polygonal corner towers on the river-front. Henry stayed at the castle when attending functions at St. Paul's Cathedral. His son Henry VIII gave the castle to his first wife Katherine of Aragon on 10 June 1509, the day before their wedding, and the Queen took up residence there. Margaret Tudor, widow of James IV of Scotland, came to stay at Baynard's Castle in May 1516. Katherine Howard journeyed to Baynard's Castle in May 1541. Later one of Henry's favourite courtiers, Sir William Sidney (c. 1482–1554), tutor to his son the future Edward VI, lived in the castle and made his will there in 1548.

By 1551 the house had passed to William Herbert, 1st Earl of Pembroke (1501–1570), the year in which that influential courtier was created Earl of Pembroke. It was at Baynard's Castle that the Privy Council met to end the claim of Lady Jane Grey to the throne and proclaim Mary as Queen of England. Pembroke's wife Anne Parr (sister of Queen Katherine Parr, widow of Henry VIII) died in the castle in 1552. The house was extended to the west in about 1550 with three wings of brick, faced with stone on the river-front. The second courtyard formed by this extension is clearly visible on Hollar's view of London before the Great Fire. Old prints show a large gateway in the middle of the south side, a bridge of two arches and steps down to the river.

The house remained in the Herbert family until the death of Philip Herbert, 4th Earl of Pembroke, Chancellor of the University of Oxford. He preferred to live at Whitehall Palace while his wife Anne Clifford (1590–1676) took up residence in Baynard's Castle, describing it in her memoirs as "a house full of riches, and more secured by my lying there". The 4th Earl sided with the Parliamentarians in the Civil War and died in 1650. By 1660 and the Restoration of the Monarchy, the house was occupied by Francis Talbot, 11th Earl of Shrewsbury, who had fought on the side of the Royalist army in their defeat at the Battle of Worcester in 1651. Samuel Pepys records that on 19 June 1660 "My Lord (i.e. his relative Edward Montagu) went at night with the King to Baynard's Castle to supper ... [the next morning he] lay long in bed this day, because he came home late from supper with the King".

== After the Great Fire ==
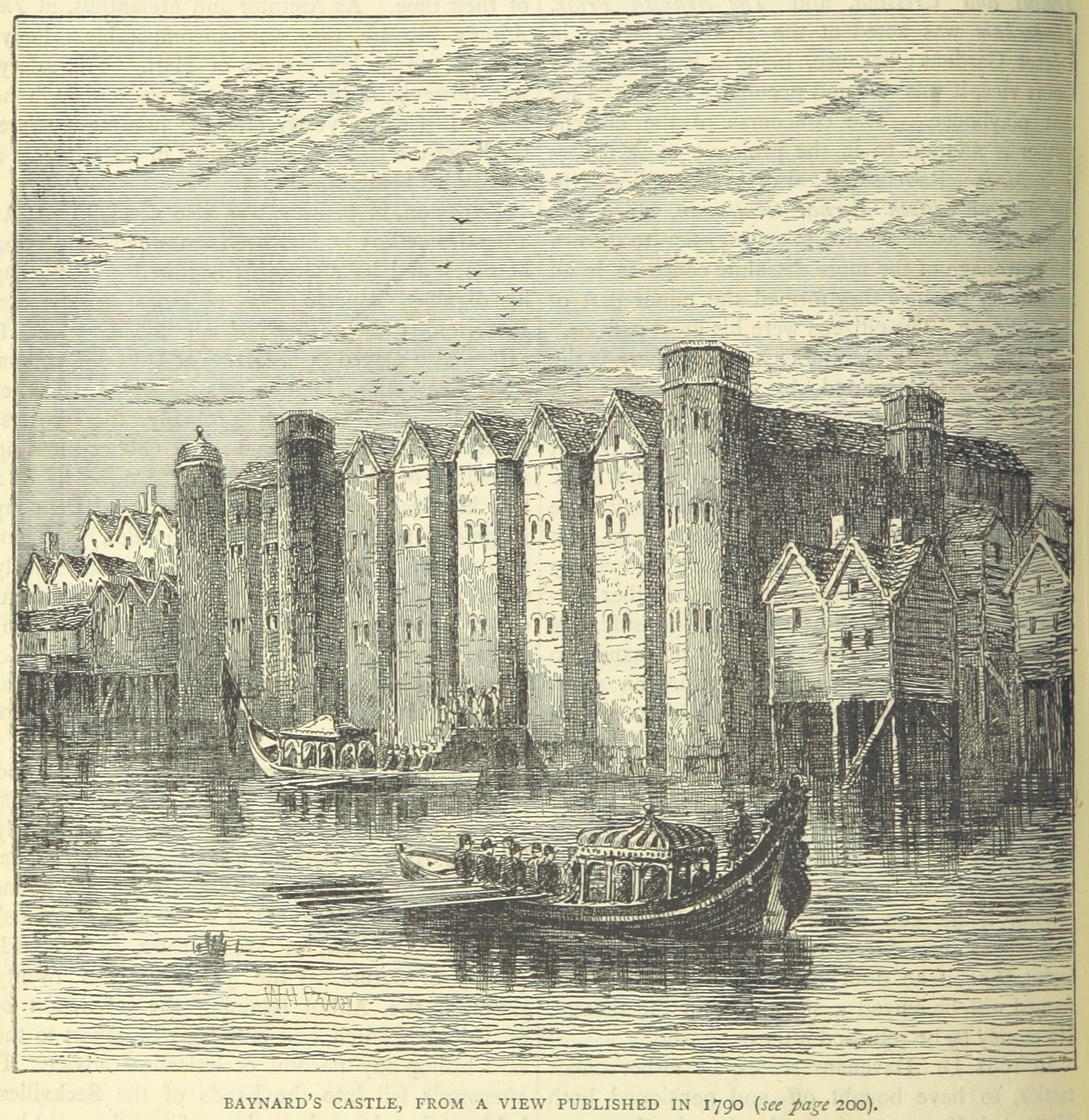
Baynard's Castle by the River Thames, a reconstructed view published in 1790

Baynard's Castle was destroyed in the Great Fire of London of 1666. The engraver Wenceslaus Hollar depicted considerable ruins standing after the fire, including the stone facade on the river side, but only a round tower was left when Strype was writing in 1720. This tower had been converted into a dwelling, whilst the rest of the site became timber yards and wood wharves with Dunghill Lane running through the site from Thames Street. Richard Horwood's map of c. 1813 shows a wharf which in 1878 belonged to the Castle Baynard Copper Company. The remaining tower (some sources say two survived) was pulled down in the 19th century to make way for warehouses of the Carron Company.

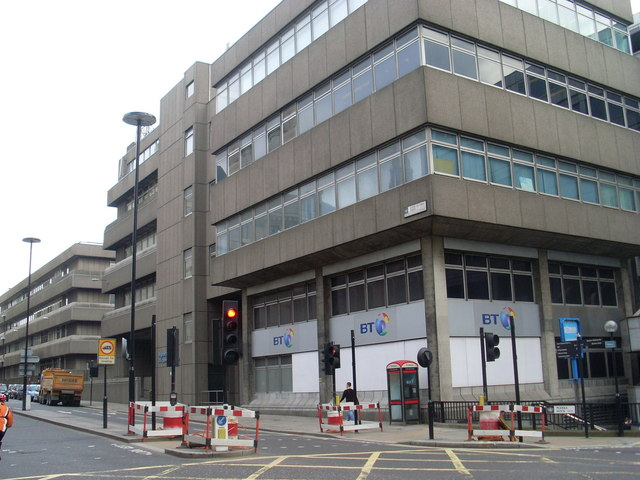
Baynard House, a concrete office block built on the site in the 1970s

In the 1970s the area was redeveloped, with the construction of the Blackfriars underpass and a Brutalist office block named Baynard House, occupied by the telephone company BT Group. Most of the site under Baynard House is a scheduled monument.

== Archaeology ==
Most of the archaeological evidence for the second Baynard's Castle comes from excavations in 1972–5, before the construction of Baynard House office block. Parts of the north wing of both the original house and extension were found, including the north gate and gatetower, and the cobbled entrance from Thames Street. Two east–west "limestone" walls were found; the excavator suggested that the more northerly one was the curtain wall of the pre-1428 castle, and the other was a post-1428 replacement. The latter was surmounted by a brick facing with a rubble core, to which a rectangular pier was attached. The castle had foundations of chalk, ragstone and mortar and was built entirely on reclaimed land. Several phases of building in the late 17th century were also identified. Excavations in 1981 at the City of London School uncovered the SE corner tower of the Tudor castle. The London Archaeological Archive codes for the excavations are BC72/GM152, UT74, BC74, BC75 and BYD81.

== See also ==
- Fortifications of London
- Montfichet's Tower – Norman castle on Ludgate Hill
- Tower of London
