= London Defence Positions =

19th century earthwork fortifications

Coordinates: 51.2539°N 0.2005°W

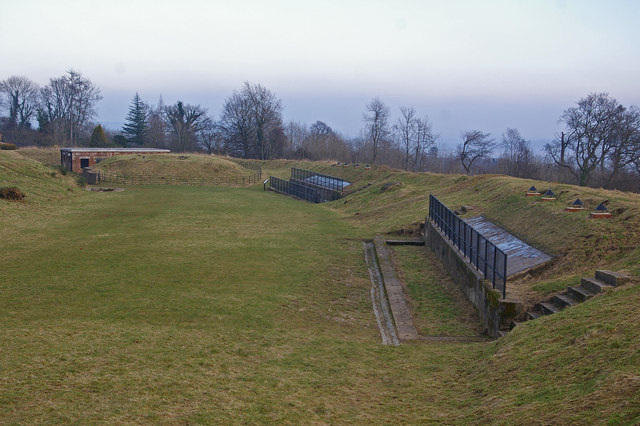
A view of Reigate Fort

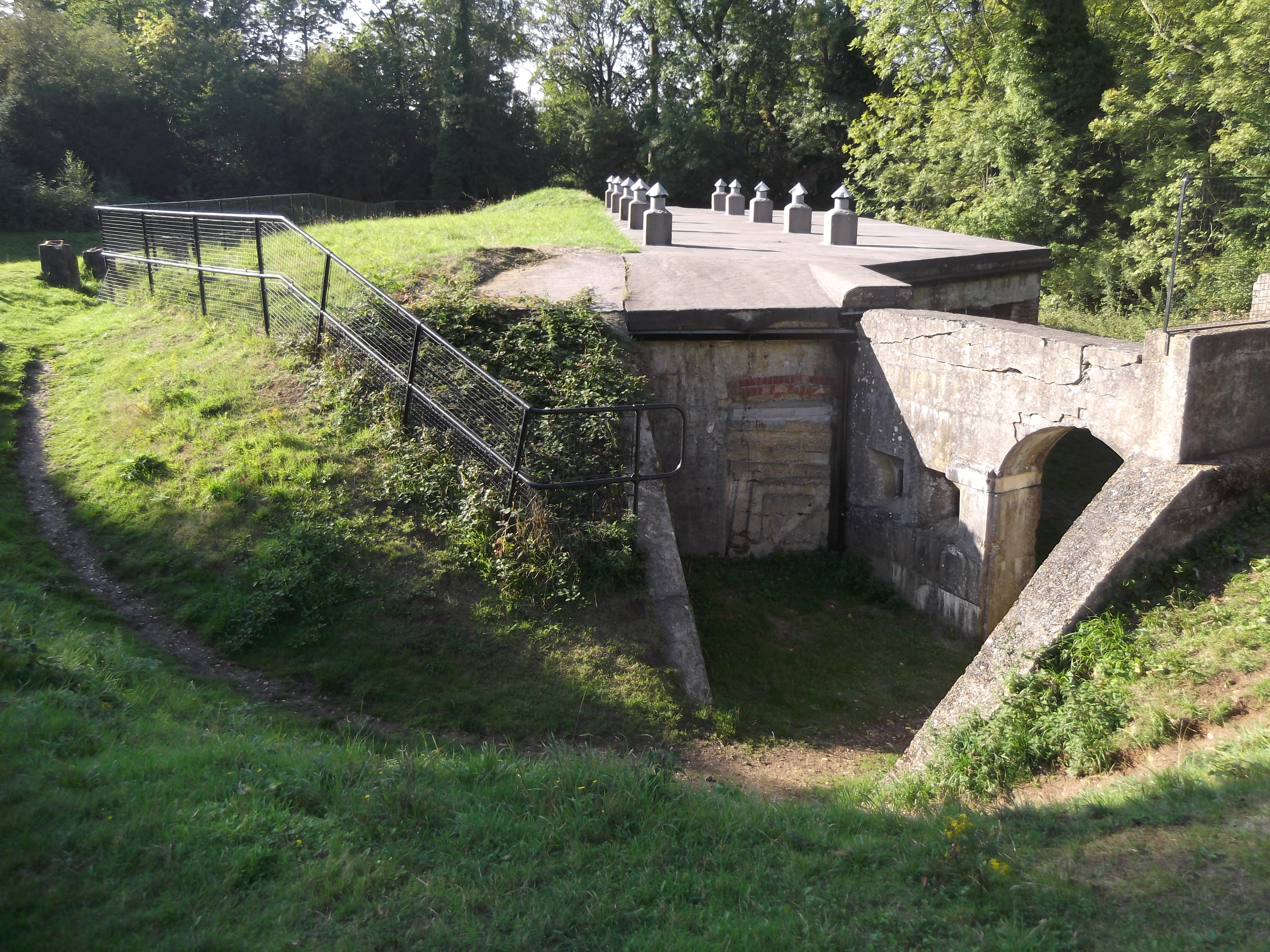
Box Hill Fort.

The London Defence Positions were a late 19th-century scheme of earthwork fortifications in the southeast of England, designed to protect London from foreign invasion landing on the south coast. The positions were a carefully surveyed contingency plan for a line of entrenchments, which could be quickly excavated in a time of emergency.

The line to be followed by these entrenchments was supported by thirteen permanent small polygonal forts or redoubts called London Mobilisation Centres, which were equipped with all the stores and ammunition that would be needed by the troops tasked with digging and manning the positions.

== Origins ==
The 1859 Royal Commission on the Defence of the United Kingdom report on Britain's defences believed that London was practically undefendable; they proposed a fort at Shooters Hill to defend the Royal Arsenal at Woolwich, but it was never acted upon. Following a number of proposals by senior military figures, an 1888 memorandum written by Colonel John Charles Ardagh envisaged a scheme of simple earthworks for infantry and moveable armaments, intended to be dug and manned in an emergency by the Volunteer Force, the line being supported by permanent works, the London Mobilisation Centres, at 5 mile (8 km) intervals, which acted as stores and magazines. The London Defence Scheme was announced in Parliament in March 1889 by the Secretary of State for War, Edward Stanhope, by which time the 13 sites for the Mobilisation Centres had already been purchased at a cost of £25,000.

== Locations ==
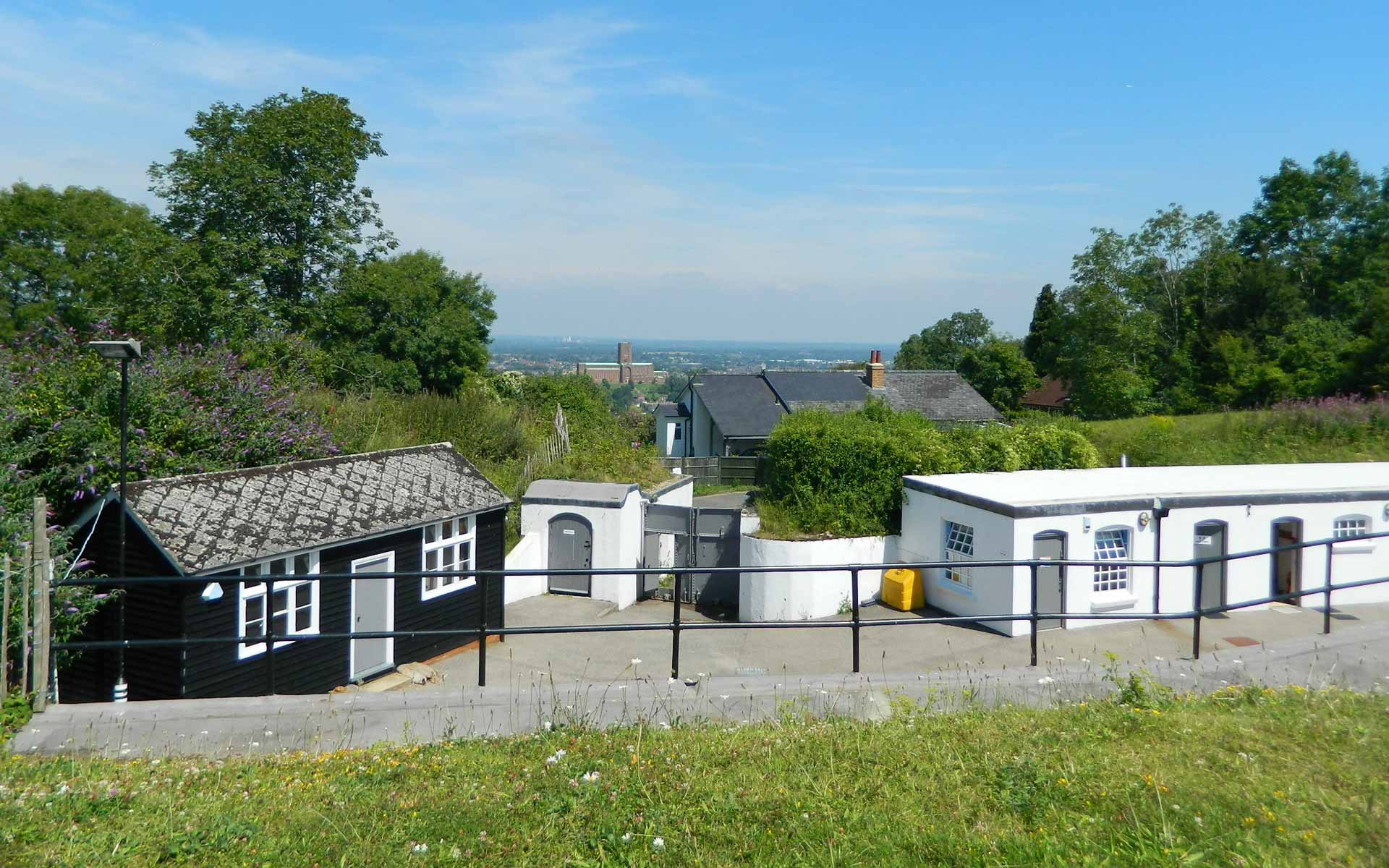
Henley Fort overlooking Guildford in Surrey, showing its commanding position high on the North Downs.

The London Mobilisation Centres were built along a 70-mile (113-kilometre) stretch of the North Downs from Guildford to the Darenth valley and across the River Thames in Essex. Thirteen sites were chosen, at Pewley Hill, Henley Grove, Denbies, Box Hill, Betchworth, Reigate, East Merstham, Fosterdown, Woldingham, Betsom's Hill, Halstead, Farningham and (to the northeast of London) North Weald.

The design of each site varied, but they were never very elaborate, just a magazine and storehouses for the mobilisation of troops, with limited defences. The intention was that the centres would, in addition to holding ammunition and other supplies, act as strong points in an almost continuous line of field fortifications. The trench lines joining the Defence Positions could be rapidly excavated on the outbreak of war. Related stores were set up at Tilbury, Warley and possibly Caterham. They were quickly viewed as obsolete, and all were sold off in 1907, with the exception of Fort Halstead, now used by DSTL.

During World War I, part of the London Defence Positions scheme was resurrected to form a stop line of trenches, in case of a German invasion. North of the Thames, the line was continued to the River Lea at Broxbourne rather than stopping at Epping. South of the Thames, it was continued to Halling, via Wrotham, linking to the Chatham defences. At the western end the line was stopped short at Buckland Hill, just beyond Reigate Fort.

At Guildford, houses have been built on the Pewley Hill site, but Henley Fort (aka Henley Grove) has been well preserved as a youth education centre. It could be seen on a Heritage Open Day.

== Reigate Fort ==
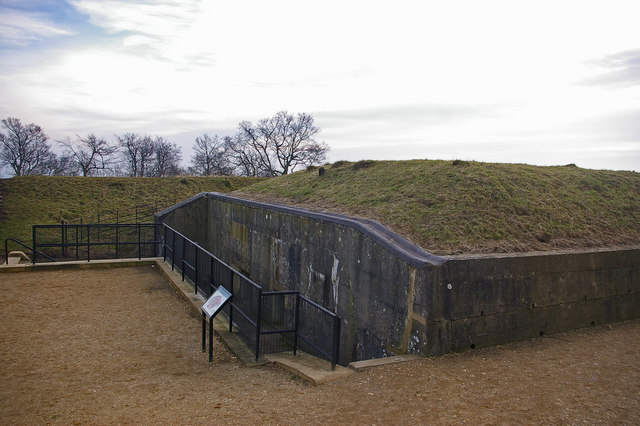
Magazine at Reigate Fort in 2009

Reigate Fort has been owned by the National Trust since 1932. The structure was falling into disrepair, but grant money from the Biffaward, the Heritage Lottery grant and the National Trust itself has enabled the Trust to restore the building. The first phase of the repairs was carried out in 2000 and was funded by a grant of £104,000 from the Biffaward. A second phase cost £174,000.

The fort opened to the public free of charge in 2007, though restoration work is ongoing. Information boards have been installed to tell visitors about the buildings.

== See also ==
- Fortifications of London
- Outer London Defence Ring - the idea revived in World War II
