= Henley Fort =

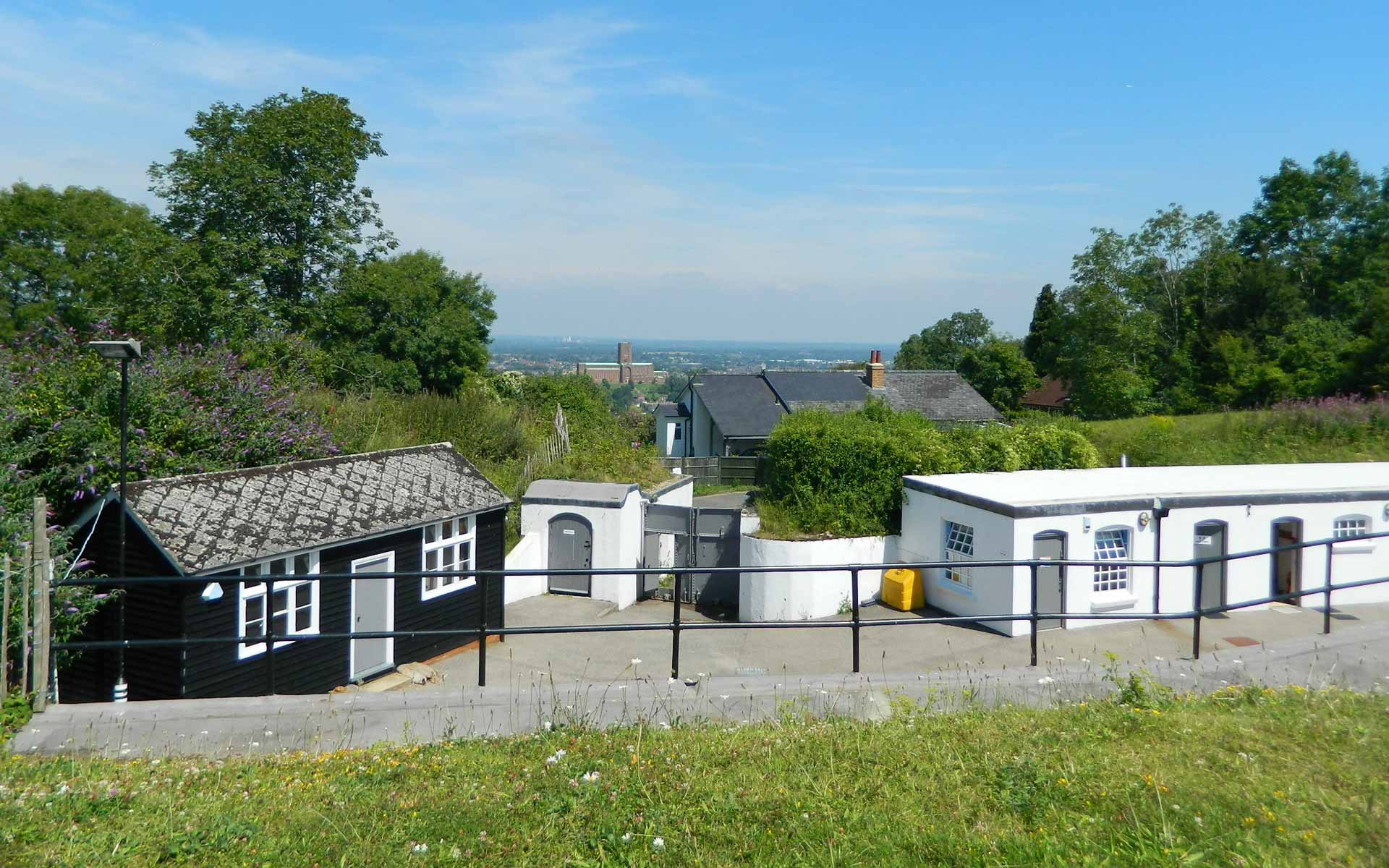
- The view across Guildford from Henley Fort

- Location within Surrey

General information
- Location: Henley Fort Outdoor Education Centre, The Mount, Guildford, Surrey, GU2 4RH, United Kingdom
- Coordinates: 51°13′50″N 0°35′49″W
- Owner: Surrey Outdoor Learning & Development

Website
- Henley Fort

Henley Fort is a Victorian fort near Guildford, Surrey, at the eastern end of the 'Hog's Back' ridge.

== History ==
Henley Fort was built as a mobilisation centre during the 1880-90s as part of the London Defence Positions. Its purpose was to protect the capital from the French army. Initially, construction was rapid due to the invasion threat, but slowed as that threat passed.

It is the most westerly fort of a 17-mile chain that would have formed a secondary line of defence between the South coast and London. It was never used as a fort in the conventional sense, having neither the men or the munitions to garrison it, and was instead used to train volunteers and as a monthly meeting place for the volunteers who manned it.

Ammunition was also created on site, and the fort was constructed using chalk in order to prevent gunpowder from detonating in the event of the fort being bombed.

During the Second World War, Henley Fort was used for defence purposes by the Home Guard.

In the 1950s it was used as a camp for local schools. Each school could attend for two weeks each year for walks around Surrey.

== Present ==
Today the fort is an educational centre run by Surrey Outdoor Learning & Development, and as such hosts groups of all types wanting an outdoor learning experience.

== Bibliography ==
- Chapman-Davies, Helen (2013). Guildford's Hidden History. Amberley Publishing Limited. ISBN 9781848686915.
- Evans, Martin Marix (1998). The Military Heritage of Britain & Ireland. Andre Deutsch Ltd. ISBN 9780233991504.
- Kerr, James (1927). The Fundamentals of School Health. Macmillan. ASIN B00089Z71K.
