= Stansted Mountfitchet Castle =

Norman ringwork and bailey fortification in Essex, England

- Stansted Mountfitchet, Essex, England
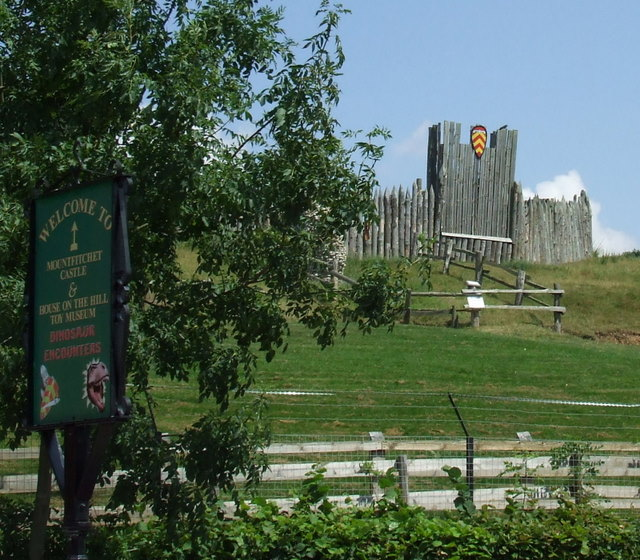
- The entrance to the castle

Site information
- Open to the public: Yes

Location
- Shown within Essex
- Coordinates: 51.9029°N 0.2007°E
- Grid reference: grid reference TL515250

Site history
- Materials: Stone and timber

Stansted Mountfitchet Castle, also termed simply Mountfitchet Castle, is a Norman ringwork and bailey fortification in Stansted Mountfitchet, Essex, England. The site is currently in use as a Living history museum.

== History ==
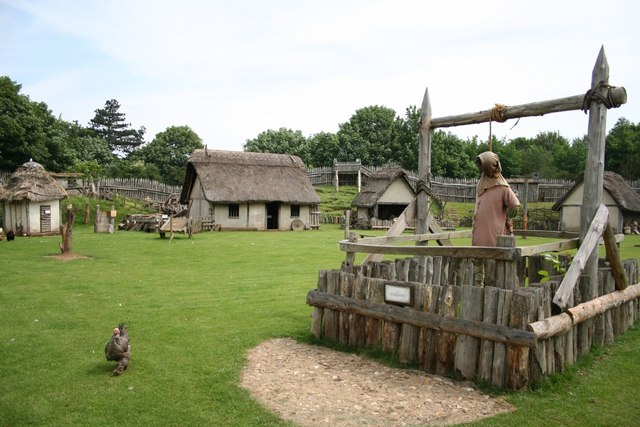
Reconstructed interior of the castle with free-roaming chickens

The castle was built following the Norman Conquest of England by the Montfitchet family. It was constructed on high ground with a ringwork defence, enclosing around 0.5 acres (0.20 ha), and a bailey complex, enclosing 1 acre (0.40 ha) on slightly lower ground. Within the ringwork was a keep, within a small, round enclosure.

It is believed to have been an early Iron Age fort and Roman, Saxon and Viking settlement. Artefacts found on the site from these periods support this belief. In 1066 the site was attacked by the Normans and Robert Gernon built his castle here, making it his chief seat and the head of his Barony. Robert Gernon (or Robert Greno as he is referred to in the Domesday Book of 1086) came over from France with William the Conqueror, and was rewarded with this lordship and several others in the county. The male line of the Gernon family continued for only five generations.

== Conservation ==
Mountfitchet Castle is a scheduled monument. In the 1980s the castle was reconstructed as a tourist attraction. The grounds were cleared to reveal the original earthworks and mounds and after years of battling with planners, in 1980 the work began to reconstruct Mountfitchet Castle. After many years of work the restoration of Mountfitchet Castle was complete, and it was opened to the public in 1985. It is unique in being the only wooden Motte and Bailey reconstruction on its original site anywhere in the world.

== Livestock ==
The castle is the home of livestock, that would have been kept by people during the period when the castle was in use. In 2013, one of the castle's cockerels, a Light Brahma named 'Little John', was nominated for the world record for tallest chicken, standing at 26 inches (660 mm) tall.

== See also ==
- Castles in Great Britain and Ireland
- List of castles in England

== Bibliography ==
- Blockley, Marion (1999). "Archaeological Reconstructions and the Community in the UK". In Planel, Philippe; Stone, Peter G. (eds.). The Constructed Past: Experimental Archaeology, Education and the Public. London, UK: Routledge. pp. 15–32. ISBN 978-0-203-20582-2.
- Pettifer, Adrian (1995). English Castles: a Guide by Counties. Woodbridge, UK: Boydell Press. ISBN 978-0-85115-782-5.
