= Montfitchet family =

Family of Norman origin

The de Montfitchet (de Montfichet, de Mountfitchet) family were of Norman origin, probably from the town of Montfiquet. Robert Gernon (Robert of the Moustache) received manorial lands in Essex in reward for his service prior to publication of the Domesday Book in 1086, and his family were subsequently based there, initially in the castle at Stansted Mountfitchet. They lasted for five generations before becoming extinct in the male line when Richard de Montfichet died without issue in 1258. Other early attested spellings include Munfichet, Muntfichet, Montefixo, and Mufchet; while later variants include Mountfiquit and Montfiket.

Amongst their accomplishments, the family founded Stratford Langthorne Abbey, which became the fifth largest in England. The links with the area were preserved even after the family disappeared, and the de Montfitchet coat of arms figured in the insignia of the County Borough of West Ham. Monfichet Road in the Queen Elizabeth Olympic Park at Stratford is named after the family. So are Montfichet's Tower in London, and the Essex town of Stansted Mountfitchet, with its partially reconstructed Castle Mountfitchet. The nearby district of Plaistow in London may have acquired its name when Phillipa de Monfitchet married Sir Hugh de Plaiz.

== See also ==
- Cavendish family, a related lineage
