= Montfiquet =

- Commune
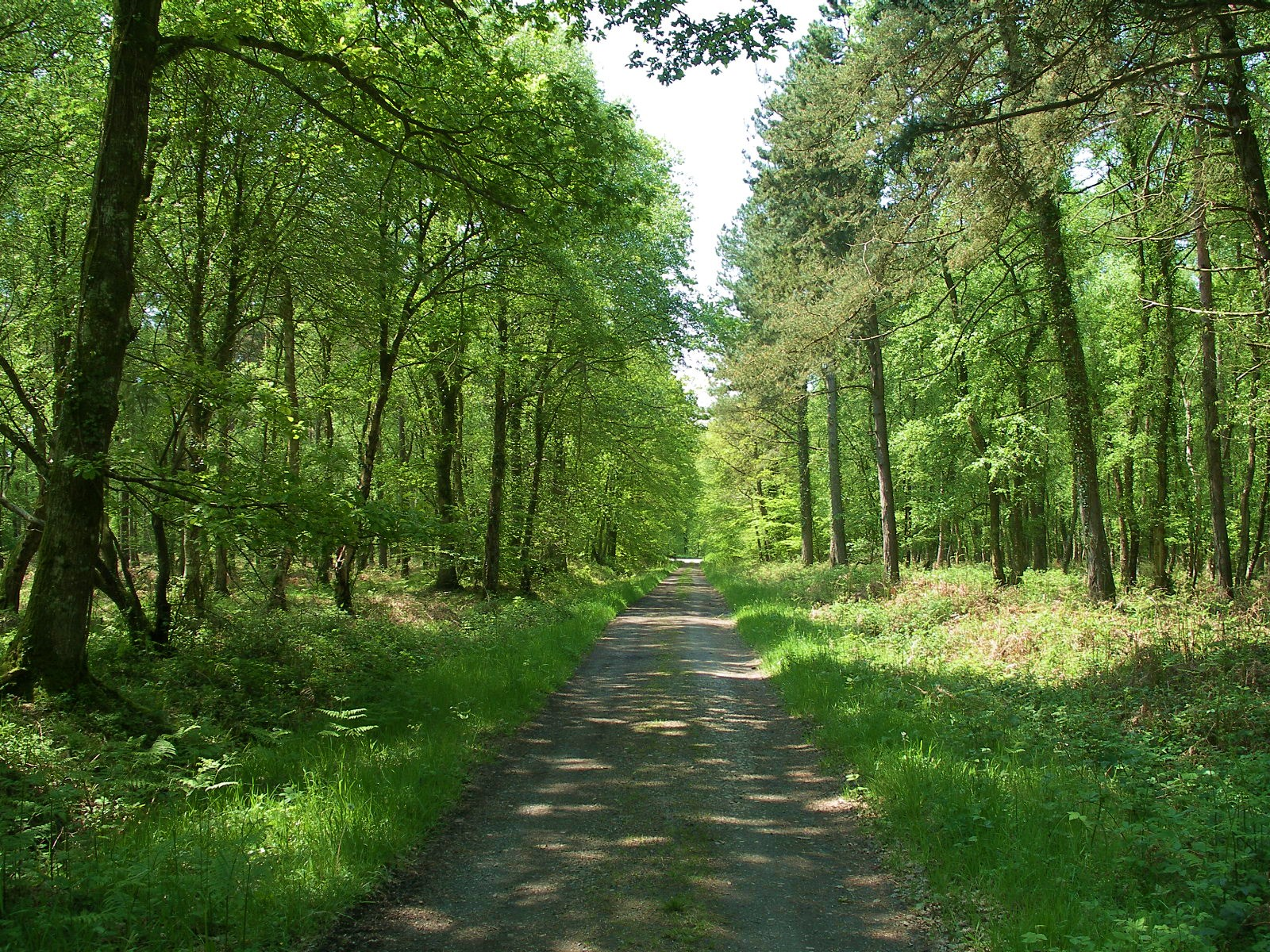
- Royal forest of Cerisy
- Location of Montfiquet
- Location within France Location within Normandy
- Coordinates: 49°10′23″N 0°53′00″W
- Country: France
- Region: Normandy
- Department: Calvados
- Arrondissement: Bayeux
- Canton: Trévières
- Intercommunality: CC Isigny-Omaha Intercom

Government
  - Mayor (2020–2026): Albert Courchant
- Area^{1}: 19.54 km^{2} (7.54 sq mi)
- Elevation: 110 m (360 ft)
- Highest elevation: 146 m (479 ft)
- Lowest elevation: 55 m (180 ft)
- Population (2023): 81
  - Density: 4.1/km^{2} (11/sq mi)
- Time zone: UTC+01:00 (CET)
  - Summer (DST): UTC+02:00 (CEST)
- INSEE/Postal code: 14445 /14490
- ^{1} French Land Register data, which excludes lakes, ponds, glaciers > 1 km^{2} (0.386 sq mi or 247 acres) and river estuaries.

Montfiquet (French pronunciation: [mɔ̃fikɛ]) is a commune in the Calvados department in the Normandy region in northwestern France.

== Population ==
Historical population
Year	Pop.	±% p.a.
1968	95	—
1975	94	−0.15%
1982	80	−2.28%
1990	87	+1.05%
1999	90	+0.38%
2007	94	+0.55%
2012	83	−2.46%
2017	106	+5.01%
2023	81	−4.38%
Source: INSEE

== See also ==
- Communes of the Calvados department
