= Ale silver =

Ale silver was a rent or tribute annually paid to the Lord Mayor of London by those that sold ale within the city of London.

== See also ==
- History of London
