= History of London =

Historical development of London

Map of Roman London, c. 400AD

The history of London, the capital and largest city (Note: Although conventionally considered a city, only the ceremonial county of the City of London and the City of Westminster borough within Greater London hold city status.) of England and the United Kingdom, extends to over 2500 years. In that time, it has become one of the world's most impactful financial and cultural centres. It has withstood plague, devastating fire, civil war, aerial bombardment, terrorist attacks, and riots.

The City of London is the historic core of the Greater London metropolis, and is today its primary financial district, though it represents only a small part of the wider metropolis.

== Prehistory until Roman foundation of the city ==
In the early 1970s, at the Fulham Palace site in West London, the discovery of struck flint by archaeologists is evidence of prehistoric activity from the late Mesolithic and early Neolithic age. The site appears to have been an isolated eyot within the braided river channel of the River Thames. Further evidence of later prehistoric activity at the Fulham Palace site ends in the late Iron Age, around 300 BC.

In 1993, the remains of a Bronze Age bridge were found on the Thames's south foreshore, upstream of Vauxhall Bridge. This bridge either crossed the Thames or went to a now-lost island in the river. Dendrology dated the timbers to between 1750 BC and 1285 BC. In 2001, a further dig found that the timbers were driven vertically into the ground on the south bank of the Thames west of Vauxhall Bridge.

In 2010, the foundations of a large timber structure, dated to between 4800 BC and 4500 BC were found, again on the foreshore south of Vauxhall Bridge. The function of the Mesolithic structure is not known. All these structures are on the south bank at a natural crossing point where the River Effra flows into the Thames.

The archaeologist, Leslie Wallace, notes, "Because no LPRIA [Late pre-Roman Iron Age] settlements or significant domestic refuse have been found in London, despite extensive archaeological excavation, arguments for a purely Roman foundation of London are now common and uncontroversial."

== Early history ==
=== Roman London (AD 47–410) ===
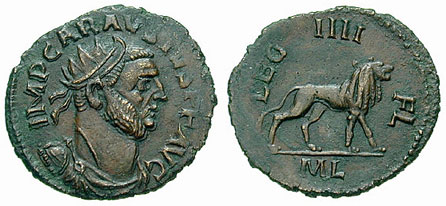
A Carausius coin from Londinium mint

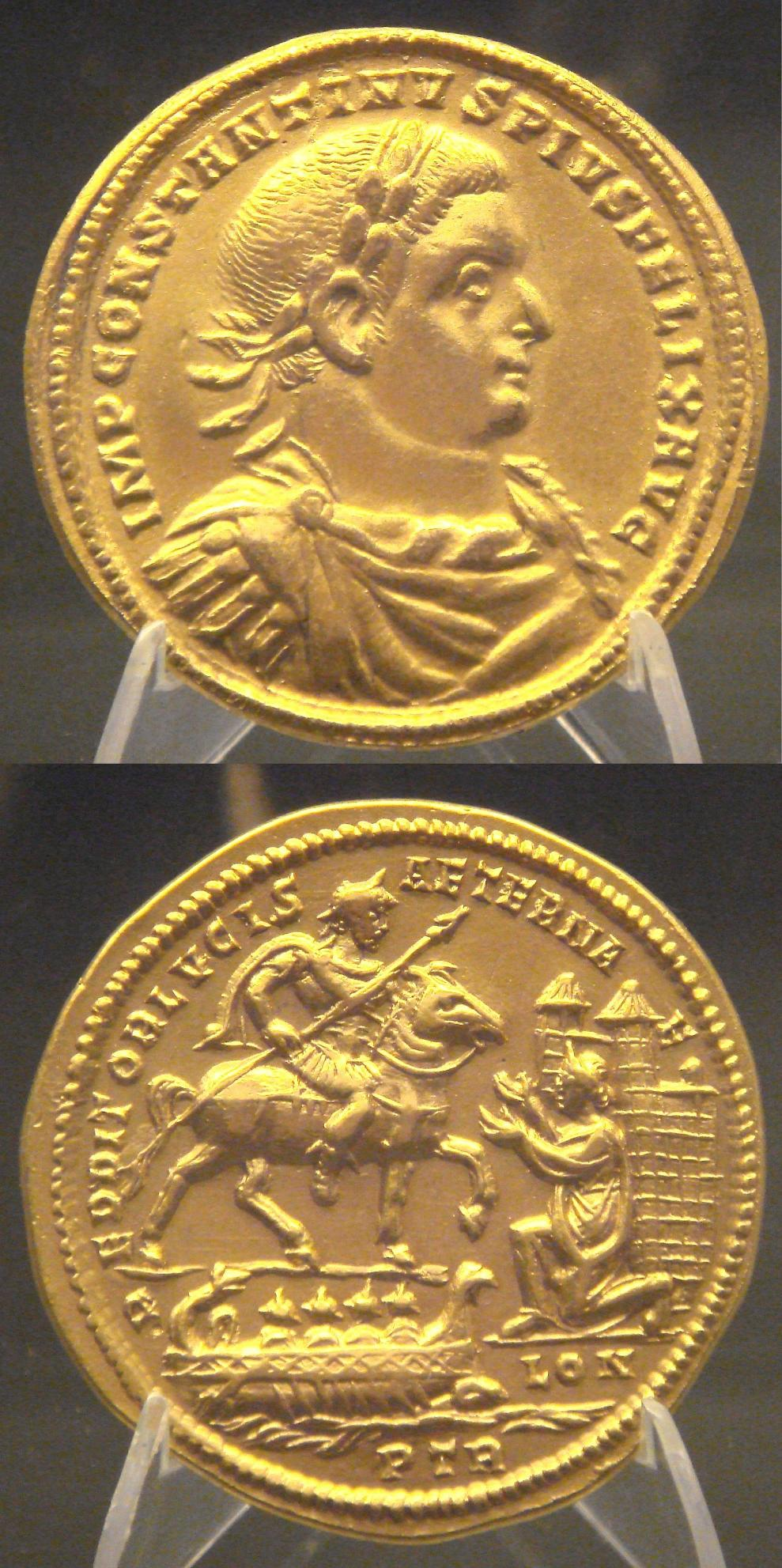
A medal of Constantius I capturing London (inscribed as lon) in 296 after defeating Allectus. From Beaurains treasure.

Londinium was established as a civilian town by the Romans about four years after the invasion of AD 43. London, like Rome, was founded on the point of the river where it was narrow enough to bridge and the strategic location of the city provided easy access to much of Europe. Early Roman London occupied a relatively small area, roughly equivalent to the size of Hyde Park. In around AD 60, it was destroyed by the Iceni led by their queen Boudica. The city was quickly rebuilt as a planned Roman town and recovered after perhaps 10 years; the city grew rapidly over the following decades.

Although some sources claim that during the 2nd century AD Londinium replaced Colchester as the capital of Roman Britain (Britannia) there is no surviving evidence to prove it was ever the capital of Roman Britain. Its population was around 60,000 inhabitants. It boasted major public buildings, including the largest basilica north of the Alps, temples, bath houses, an amphitheatre and a large fort for the city garrison. Political instability and recession from the 3rd century onwards led to a slow decline.

At some time between 180 and 225, the Romans built the defensive London Wall around the landward side of the city. The wall was about 3 kilometres (2 mi) long, 6 metres (20 ft) high, and 2.5 metres (8 ft) thick. The wall would survive for another 1,600 years and define the City of London's perimeters for centuries to come. The perimeters of the present city are roughly defined by the line of the ancient wall.

Londinium was an ethnically diverse city with inhabitants from across the Roman Empire, including natives of Britannia, continental Europe, the Middle East, and North Africa.

In the late 3rd century, Londinium was raided on several occasions by Saxon pirates. This led, from around 255 onwards, to the construction of an additional riverside wall. Six of the traditional seven city gates of London are of Roman origin, namely: Ludgate, Newgate, Aldersgate, Cripplegate, Bishopsgate and Aldgate. (Moorgate is the exception, being of medieval origin.)

By the 5th century, the Roman Empire was in rapid decline and in 410, the Roman occupation of Britannia came to an end. Following this, the Roman city also went into rapid decline and by the end of the 5th century was practically abandoned.

=== Anglo-Saxon London (5th century – 1066) ===
Until recently it was believed that Anglo-Saxon settlements initially avoided the area immediately around Londinium. However, the discovery in 2008 of an Anglo-Saxon cemetery at Covent Garden indicates that the incomers had begun to settle there at least as early as the 6th century and possibly in the 5th. The main focus of this settlement was outside the Roman walls, clustering a short distance to the west along what is now the Strand, between the Aldwych and Trafalgar Square. It was known as Lundenwic, the -wic suffix here denoting a trading settlement. Recent excavations have also highlighted the population density and relatively sophisticated urban organisation of this earlier Anglo-Saxon London, which was laid out on a grid pattern and grew to house a likely population of 10,000 to 12,000.

Early Anglo-Saxon London belonged to a people known as the Middle Saxons, from whom the name of the county of Middlesex is derived, but who probably also occupied the approximate area of modern Hertfordshire and Surrey. However, by the early 7th century the London area had been incorporated into the kingdom of the East Saxons. In 604 King Sæberht of Essex converted to Christianity and London received Mellitus, its first post-Roman bishop.

At this time Essex was under the overlordship of King Æthelberht of Kent, and it was under Æthelberht's patronage that Mellitus founded the first St. Paul's Cathedral, traditionally said to be on the site of an old Roman Temple of Diana (although Christopher Wren found no evidence of this). It would have only been a modest church at first and may well have been destroyed after he was expelled from the city by Saeberht's pagan successors.

The permanent establishment of Christianity in the East Saxon kingdom took place during the reign of King Sigeberht II in the 650s. During the 8th century, the kingdom of Mercia extended its dominance over south-eastern England, initially through overlordship which at times developed into outright annexation. London seems to have come under direct Mercian control in the 730s.

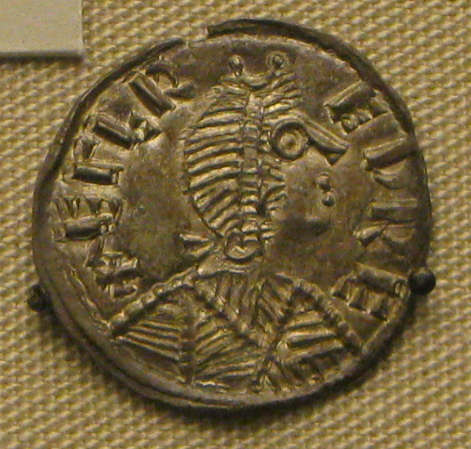
A silver coin of Alfred, with the legend ÆLFRED REX

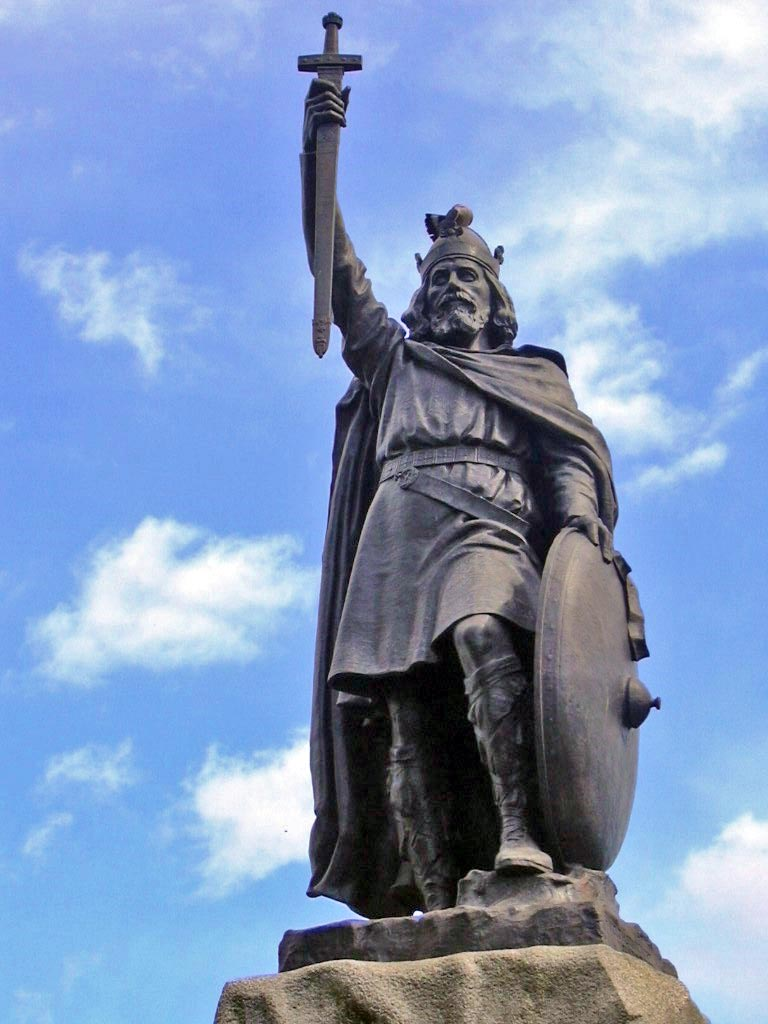
The statue of Alfred the Great at Winchester, erected 1899

Viking attacks dominated most of the 9th century, becoming increasingly common from around 830 onwards. London was sacked in 842 and again in 851. The Danish "Great Heathen Army", which had rampaged across England since 865, wintered in London in 871. The city remained in Danish hands until 886, when it was captured by the forces of King Alfred the Great of Wessex and reincorporated into Mercia, then governed under Alfred's sovereignty by his son-in-law Ealdorman Æthelred.

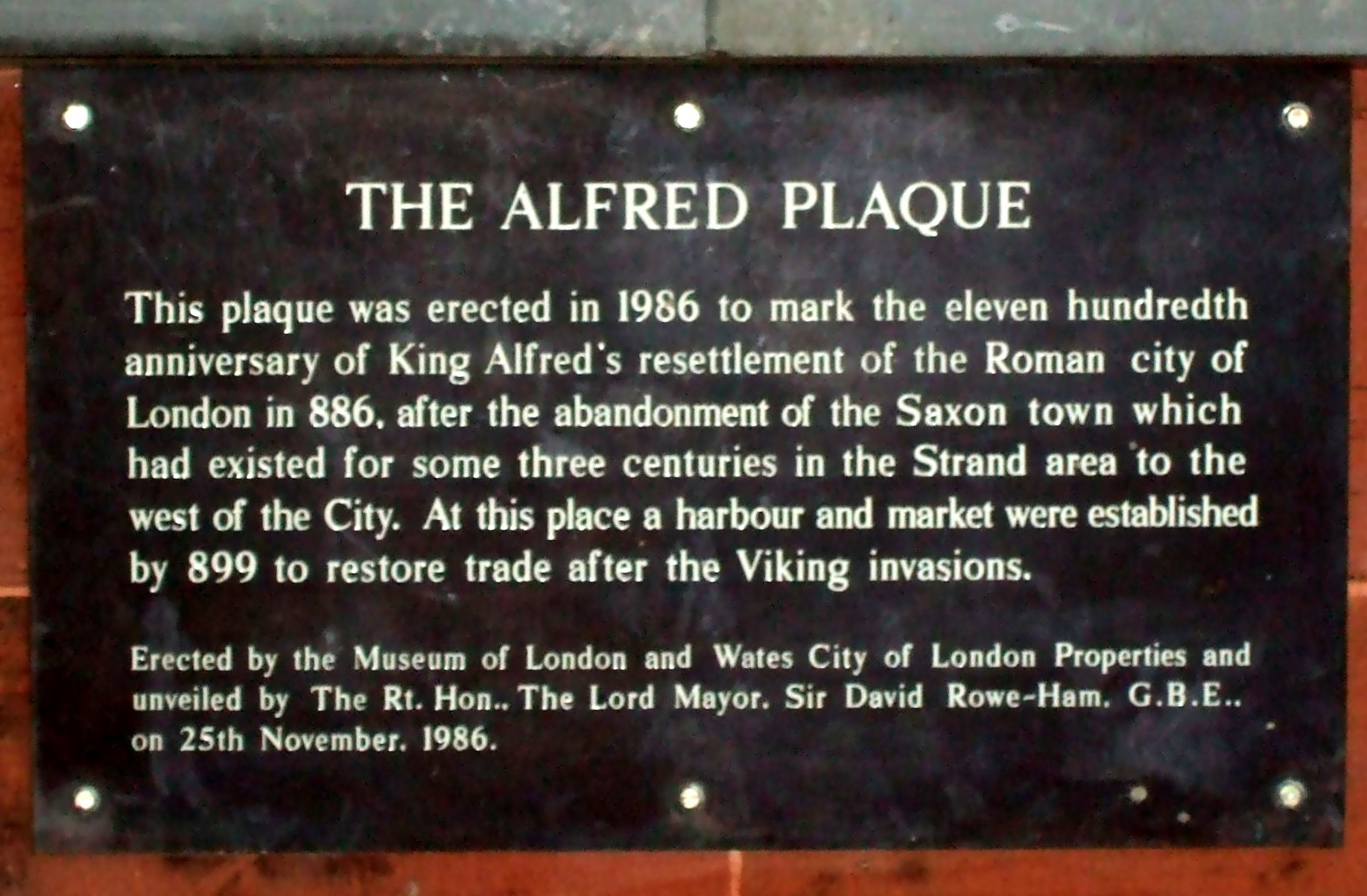
A plaque in the City of London noting the re-establishment of the Roman walled city

Around this time the focus of settlement moved within the old Roman walls for the sake of defence, and the city became known as Lundenburh. The Roman walls were repaired and the defensive ditch re-cut, while the bridge was probably rebuilt at this time. A second fortified borough was established on the south bank at Southwark, the Suþringa Geworc (defensive work of the men of Surrey). The old settlement of Lundenwic became known as the eald wic or "old settlement", a name which survives today as Aldwych.

From this point, the City of London began to develop its own unique local government. Following Æthelred's death in 911 it was transferred to Wessex, preceding the absorption of the rest of Mercia in 918. Although it faced competition for political pre-eminence in the united Kingdom of England from the traditional West Saxon centre of Winchester, London's size and commercial wealth brought it a steadily increasing importance as a focus of governmental activity. King Athelstan held many meetings of the witan in London and issued laws from there, while King Æthelred the Unready issued the Laws of London there in 978.

Following the resumption of Viking attacks in the reign of Æthelred, London was unsuccessfully attacked in 994 by an army under King Sweyn Forkbeard of Denmark. As English resistance to the sustained and escalating Danish onslaught finally collapsed in 1013, London repulsed an attack by the Danes and was the last place to hold out while the rest of the country submitted to Sweyn, but by the end of the year it too capitulated and Æthelred fled abroad. Sweyn died just five weeks after having been proclaimed king and Æthelred was restored to the throne, but Sweyn's son Cnut returned to the attack in 1015.

After Æthelred's death at London in 1016 his son Edmund Ironside was proclaimed king there by the witangemot and left to gather forces in Wessex. London was then subjected to a systematic siege by Cnut but was relieved by King Edmund's army; when Edmund again left to recruit reinforcements in Wessex the Danes resumed the siege but were again unsuccessful. However, following his defeat at the Battle of Assandun Edmund ceded to Cnut all of England north of the Thames, including London, and his death a few weeks later left Cnut in control of the whole country.

A Norse saga tells of a battle when King Æthelred returned to attack Danish-occupied London. According to the saga, the Danes lined London Bridge and showered the attackers with spears. Undaunted, the attackers pulled the roofs off nearby houses and held them over their heads in the boats. Thus protected, they were able to get close enough to the bridge to attach ropes to the piers and pull the bridge down, thus ending the Viking occupation of London. This story presumably relates to Æthelred's return to power after Sweyn's death in 1014, but there is no strong evidence of any such struggle for control of London on that occasion.

Following the extinction of Cnut's dynasty in 1042 English rule was restored under Edward the Confessor. He was responsible for the foundation of Westminster Abbey and spent much of his time upstream of the City at Westminster, which from this time steadily supplanted the City itself as the centre of government. Edward's death at Westminster in 1066 without a clear heir led to a succession dispute and the Norman Conquest of England. Earl Harold Godwinson was elected king by the witangemot and crowned at Westminster Abbey, but was defeated and killed by William II, Duke of Normandy at the Battle of Hastings. The surviving members of the witan met in London and elected King Edward's young nephew Edgar the Ætheling as king.

The Normans advanced to the south bank of the Thames opposite London, where they defeated an English attack and burned Southwark, but were unable to storm the bridge. They moved upstream and crossed the river at Wallingford before advancing on London from the north-west. The resolve of the English leadership to resist collapsed and the chief citizens of London went out together with the leading members of the Church and aristocracy to submit to William at Berkhamsted, although according to some accounts there was a subsequent violent clash when the Normans reached the city. Having occupied London, William was crowned king in Westminster Abbey.

=== Norman and Medieval London (1066 – late 15th century) ===
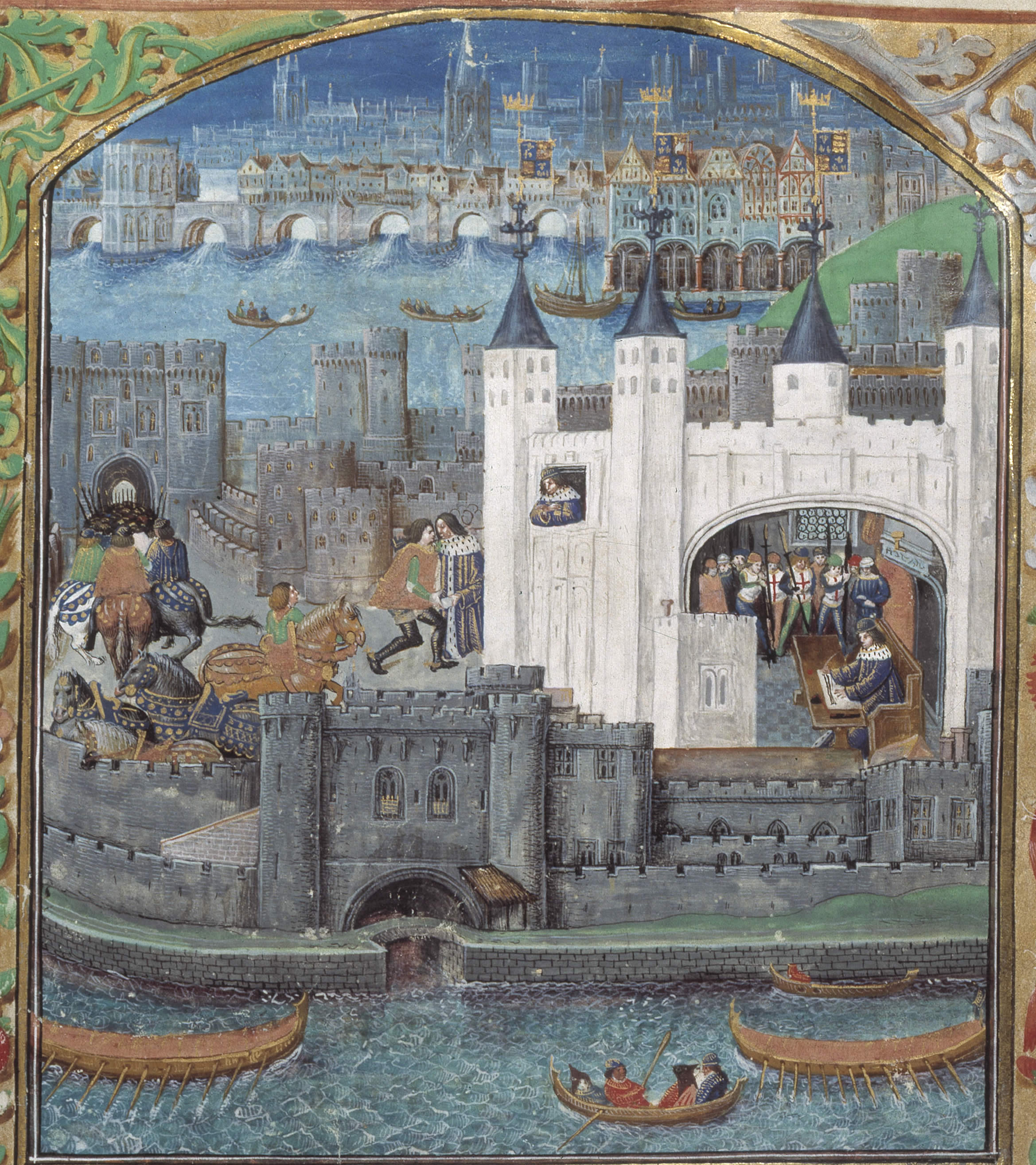
A depiction of the imprisonment of Charles, Duke of Orléans in the Tower of London, from a 15th-century manuscript. Old London Bridge is in the background

The new Norman regime established new fortresses within the city to dominate the native population. By far the most important of these was the Tower of London at the eastern end of the city, where the initial timber fortification was rapidly replaced by the construction of the first stone castle in England. The smaller forts of Baynard's Castle and Montfichet's Castle were also established along the waterfront. King William also granted a charter in 1067 confirming the city's existing rights, privileges and laws. London was a centre of England's nascent Jewish population, the first of whom arrived in about 1070. Its growing self-government was consolidated by the election rights granted by King John in 1199 and 1215.

On 17 October 1091 a tornado rated T8 on the TORRO scale (equivalent to an F4 on the Fujita scale) hit London; it directly struck the church of St. Mary-le-Bow; four rafters 7.9 m (26 ft) long were said to have been buried so deep into the ground that only 1.2 m (3 ft 11 in) was visible. Other churches in the area were destroyed as well; it was reported to have also destroyed over 600 houses (although most of them were primarily wood) and hit the London Bridge, after the tornado the bridge was rebuilt in stone. The tornado caused two deaths and an unknown number of injuries; this tornado is mentioned in chronicles by Florence of Worcester and William of Malmesbury, the latter of the two describing it as "a great spectacle for those watching from afar, but a terrifying experience for those standing near".

In 1097, William Rufus, the son of William the Conqueror, began the construction of Westminster Hall, which became the focus of the Palace of Westminster.

In 1176, construction began of the most famous incarnation of London Bridge (completed in 1209), which was built on the site of several earlier timber bridges. This bridge would last for 600 years, and remained London's only bridge across the River Thames until 1739.

Antisemitic violence against Jews took place in 1190, after it was rumoured that the new King had ordered their massacre after they had presented themselves at his coronation.

In 1216, during the First Barons' War London was occupied by Prince Louis of France, who had been called in by the baronial rebels against King John and was acclaimed as King of England in St Paul's Cathedral. However, following John's death in 1217 Louis's supporters reverted to their Plantagenet allegiance, rallying round John's son Henry III, and Louis was forced to withdraw from England.

In 1224, after an accusation of ritual murder, the Jewish community was subjected to a steep punitive levy. Then in 1232, Henry III confiscated the principal synagogue of the London Jewish community because he claimed their chanting was audible in a neighbouring church. In 1264, during the Second Barons' War, Simon de Montfort's rebels occupied London and killed 500 Jews while attempting to seize records of debts.

London's Jewish community was forced to leave England by the Edict of Expulsion issued by King Edward I in 1290. They left for France, Holland and farther afield; their property was seized, and many suffered robbery and murder as they departed.

Over the following centuries, London would shake off the heavy French cultural and linguistic influence which had been there since the times of the Norman conquest. The city would figure heavily in the development of Early Modern English.

London c. 1300

During the Peasants' Revolt of 1381, London was invaded by rebels led by Wat Tyler. A group of peasants stormed the Tower of London and executed the Lord Chancellor, Archbishop Simon Sudbury, and the Lord Treasurer. The peasants looted the city and set fire to numerous buildings. Tyler was stabbed to death by the Lord Mayor William Walworth in a confrontation at Smithfield and the revolt collapsed.

Trade increased steadily during the Middle Ages, and London grew heavily as a result. In 1100, London's population was somewhat more than 15,000. By 1300, it had grown to roughly 80,000. London lost at least half of its population during the Black Death in the mid-14th century, but its economic and political importance stimulated a quick recovery despite further epidemics. Trade in London was organised into various craft guilds, which effectively controlled the city, and elected the Lord Mayor of London.

Medieval London was made up of narrow and twisting streets, and most of the buildings were made from combustible materials such as timber and straw, which made fire a constant threat, while sanitation in cities was of low-quality.

== Modern history ==
=== Tudor London (1485–1604) ===
Wyngaerde's "Panorama of London in 1543"
Section 1	Section 2	Section 3

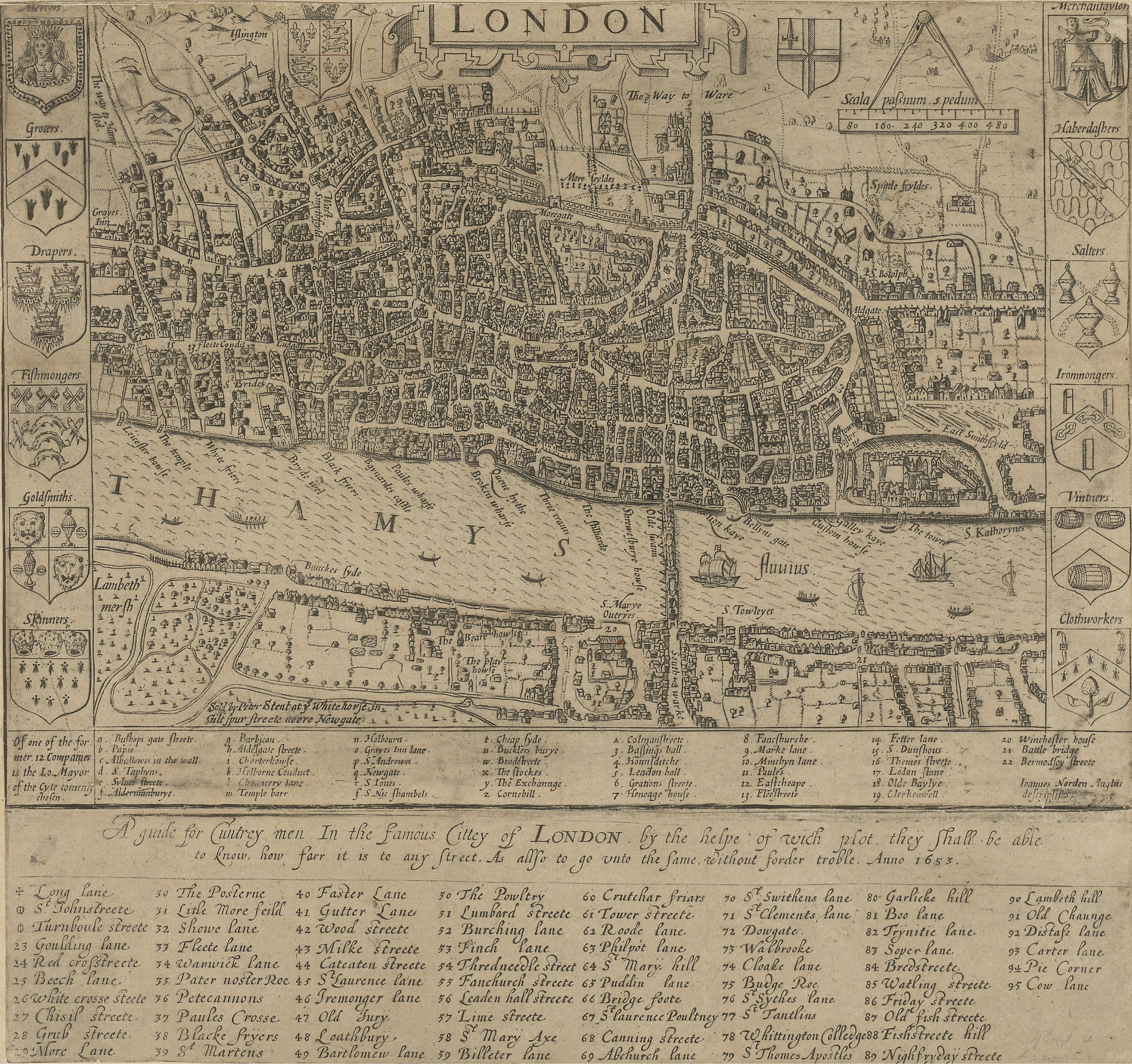
John Norden's map of London in 1593. There is only one bridge across the Thames, but parts of Southwark on the south bank of the river have been developed.

In 1475, the Hanseatic League set up its main English trading base (kontor) in London, called Stalhof or Steelyard. It existed until 1853, when the Hanseatic cities of Lübeck, Bremen and Hamburg sold the property to South Eastern Railway. Woollen cloth was shipped undyed and undressed from 14th/15th century London to the nearby shores of the Low Countries, where it was considered indispensable.

During the English Reformation, London was the principal early centre of Protestantism in England. Its close commercial connections with the Protestant heartlands in northern continental Europe, large foreign mercantile communities, disproportionately large number of literate inhabitants and role as the centre of the English print trade all contributed to the spread of the new ideas of religious reform. Before the Reformation, more than half of the area of London was the property of monasteries, nunneries and other religious houses.

King Henry VIII's "dissolution of the monasteries" had a profound effect on the city as nearly all of this property changed hands. The process started in the mid-1530s, and by 1538 most of the larger monastic houses had been abolished. Holy Trinity Aldgate went to Lord Audley, and the Marquess of Winchester built himself a house in part of its precincts. The Charterhouse went to Lord North, Blackfriars to Lord Cobham, the leper hospital of St Giles to Lord Dudley, while the king took for himself the leper hospital of St James, which was rebuilt as St James's Palace.

The period saw London rapidly rising in importance among Europe's commercial centres. Trade expanded beyond Western Europe to Russia, the Levant, and the Americas. This was the period of mercantilism and monopoly trading companies such as the Muscovy Company (1555) and the British East India Company (1600) were established in London by royal charter. The latter, which ultimately came to rule India, was one of the key institutions in London, and in Britain as a whole, for two and a half centuries. Immigrants arrived in London not just from all over England and Wales, but from abroad as well, for example Huguenots from France; the population rose from an estimated 50,000 in 1530 to about 225,000 in 1605. The growth of the population and wealth of London was fuelled by a vast expansion in the use of coastal shipping.

The late 16th and early 17th century saw the great flourishing of drama in London whose preeminent figure was the poet and playwright William Shakespeare. During the mostly calm later years of Elizabeth's reign, some of her courtiers and some of the wealthier citizens of London built themselves country residences in Middlesex, Essex and Surrey. This was an early stirring of the villa movement, the taste for residences which were neither of the city nor on an agricultural estate, but at the time of Elizabeth's death in 1603, London was still relatively compact.

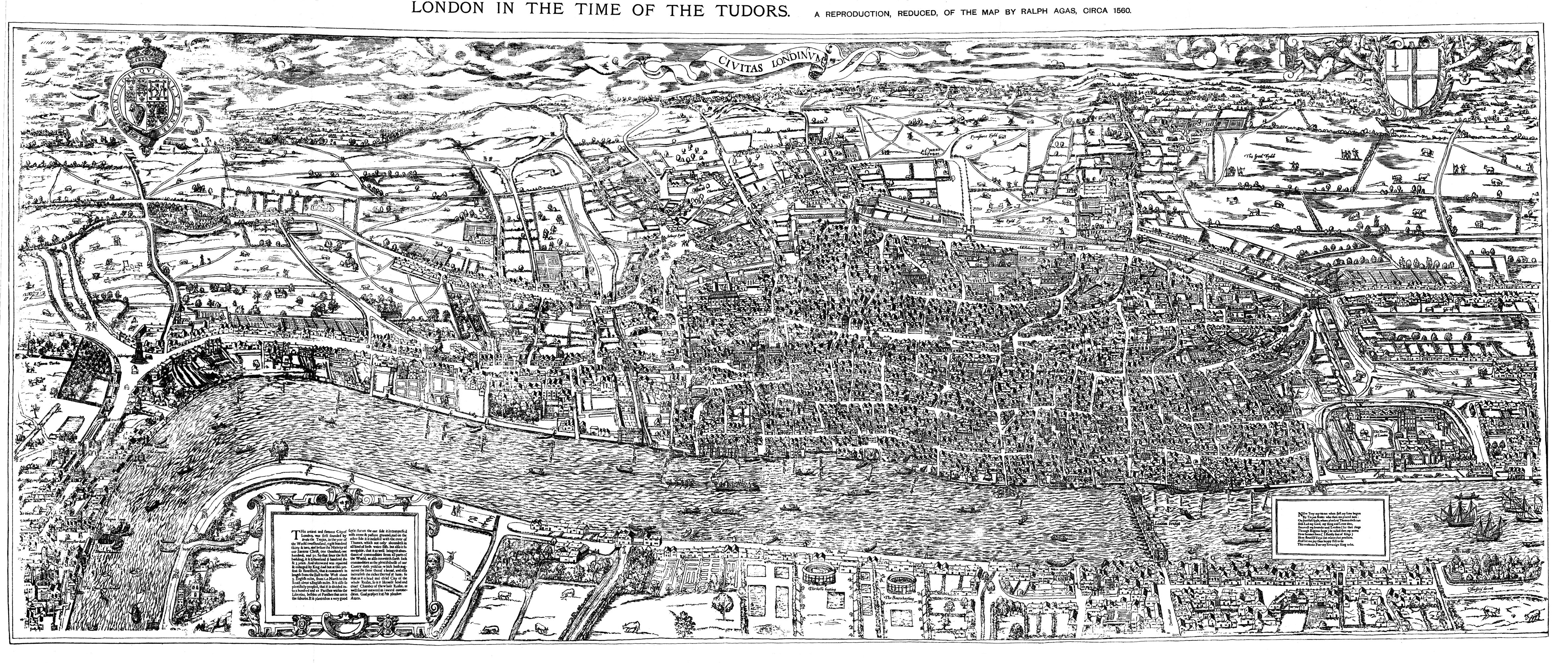
The "Woodcut" map of London, formally titled Civitas Londinum (c. 1561)

Xenophobia was rampant in London, and increased after the 1580s. Many immigrants became disillusioned by routine threats of violence and molestation, attempts at expulsion of foreigners, and the great difficulty in acquiring English citizenship. Dutch cities proved more hospitable, and many left London permanently. Foreigners are estimated to have made up 4,000 of the 100,000 residents of London by 1600, many being Dutch and German workers and traders.

=== Stuart London (1603–1714) ===
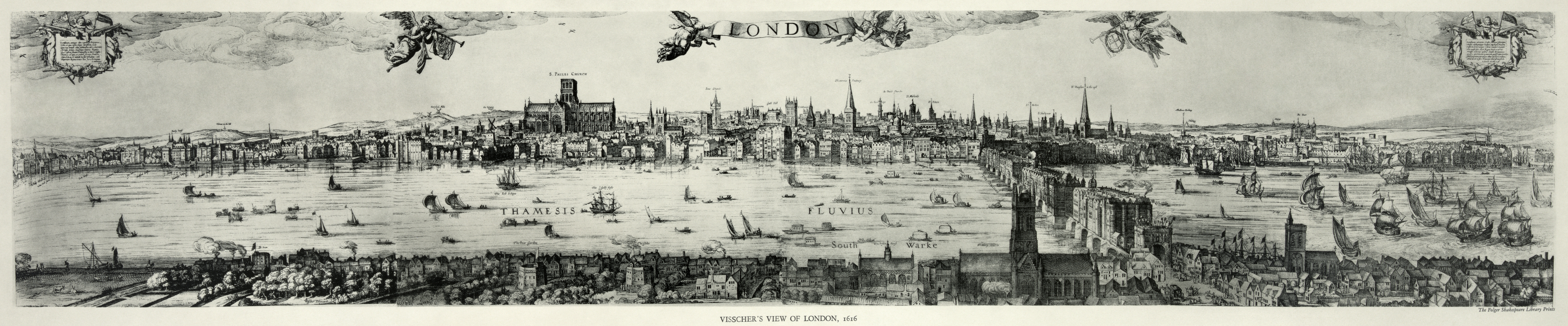
A panorama of London by Claes Jansz. Visscher, 1616. Old St Paul's Cathedral had lost its spire by this time. The two theatres on the foreground (Southwark) side of the Thames are The Bear Garden and The Globe. The large church in the foreground is St Mary Overie, now Southwark Cathedral.

London's expansion beyond the boundaries of the city was decisively established in the 17th century. In the opening years of that century the immediate environs of the city, with the principal exception of the aristocratic residences in the direction of Westminster, were still considered not conducive to health. Immediately to the north was Moorfields, which had recently been drained and laid out in walks, but it was frequented by beggars and travellers, who crossed it in order to get into London. Adjoining Moorfields were Finsbury Fields, a favourite practising ground for the archers, Mile End, then a common on the Great Eastern Road and famous as a rendezvous for the troops.

The preparations for King James I's accession to the throne were interrupted by a severe plague epidemic, which may have killed over thirty thousand people. The Lord Mayor's Show, which had been discontinued for some years, was revived by order of the king in 1609. The dissolved monastery of the Charterhouse, which had been bought and sold by the courtiers several times, was purchased by Thomas Sutton for £13,000. The new hospital, chapel, and schoolhouse were begun in 1611. Charterhouse School was to be one of the principal public schools in London until it moved to Surrey in the Victorian era, and the site is still used as a medical school.

The general meeting-place of Londoners in the day-time was the nave of Old St. Paul's Cathedral. Merchants conducted business in the aisles, and used the font as a counter upon which to make their payments; lawyers received clients at their particular pillars; and the unemployed looked for work. St Paul's Churchyard was the centre of the book trade and Fleet Street was a centre of public entertainment. Under James I the theatre, which established itself so firmly in the latter years of Elizabeth, grew further in popularity. The performances at the public theatres were complemented by elaborate masques at the royal court and at the inns of court.

Charles I acceded to the throne in 1625. During his reign, aristocrats began to inhabit the West End in large numbers. In addition to those who had specific business at court, increasing numbers of country landowners and their families lived in London for part of the year simply for the social life. This was the beginning of the "London season". Lincoln's Inn Fields was built about 1629. The piazza of Covent Garden, designed by England's first classically trained architect Inigo Jones followed in about 1632. The neighbouring streets were built shortly afterwards, and the names of Henrietta, Charles, James, King and York Streets were given after members of the royal family.

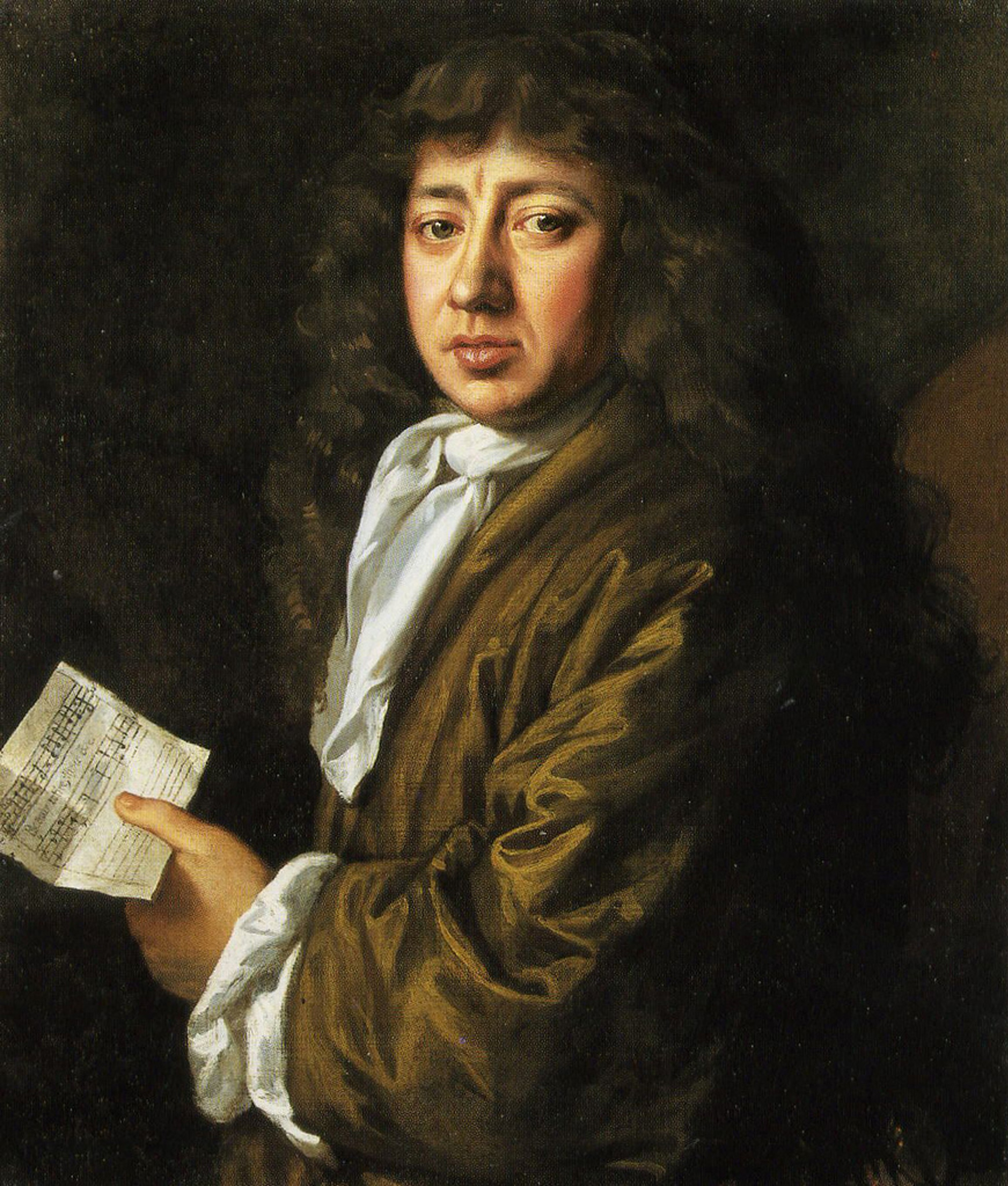
Samuel Pepys, chronicler of Stuart London

In January 1642 five members of the Parliament of England whom the King wished to arrest were granted refuge in the city. In August of the same year the King raised his banner at Nottingham, and during the English Civil War London took the side of the parliament. Initially the king had the upper hand in military terms and in November he won the Battle of Brentford a few miles to the west of London. The City organised a new makeshift army and Charles hesitated and retreated.

Subsequently, an extensive system of fortifications was built to protect London from a renewed attack by the Royalists. This comprised a strong earthen rampart, enhanced with bastions and redoubts. It was well beyond the City walls and encompassed the whole urban area, including Westminster and Southwark. London was not seriously threatened by the royalists again, and the financial resources of the city made an important contribution to the Parliamentarians' victory in the war.

The unsanitary and overcrowded City of London has suffered numerous outbreaks of the plague many times over the centuries, but in Britain it is the last major outbreak which is remembered as the "Great Plague". It occurred in 1665 and 1666 and killed around 60,000 people, which was one-fifth of the population. Samuel Pepys chronicled the epidemic in his diary. On 4 September 1665 he wrote "I have stayed in the city till above 7400 died in one week, and of them about 6000 of the plague, and little noise heard day or night but tolling of bells."

==== Great Fire of London (1666) ====
The Great Plague was immediately followed by another catastrophe, albeit one which helped to put an end to the plague. On the Sunday, 2 September 1666 the Great Fire of London broke out at one o'clock in the morning at a bakery in Pudding Lane in the southern part of the city. Fanned by an eastern wind the fire spread, and efforts to arrest it by pulling down houses to make firebreaks were disorganised to begin with. On Tuesday night the wind fell somewhat, and on Wednesday the fire slackened. On Thursday it was extinguished, but on the evening of that day the flames again burst forth at the Temple. Some houses were at once blown up by gunpowder, and thus the fire was finally mastered. The Monument was built to commemorate the fire: for over a century and a half it bore an inscription attributing the conflagration to a "popish frenzy".

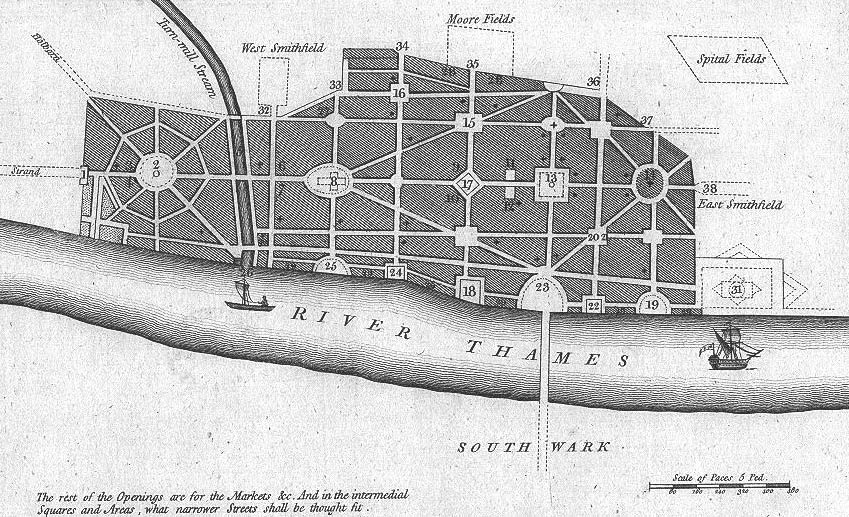
John Evelyn's plan for the rebuilding of London after the Great Fire

The fire destroyed about 60% of the city, including Old St Paul's Cathedral, 87 parish churches, 44 livery company halls and the Royal Exchange. However, the number of lives lost was surprisingly small; it is believed to have been 16 at most. Within a few days of the fire, three plans were presented to the king for the rebuilding of the city, by Christopher Wren, John Evelyn and Robert Hooke.

Wren proposed to build main thoroughfares north and south, and east and west, to insulate all the churches in conspicuous positions, to form the most public places into large piazzas, to unite the halls of the 12 chief livery companies into one regular square annexed to the Guildhall, and to make a fine quay on the bank of the river from Blackfriars to the Tower of London. Wren wished to build the new streets straight and in three standard widths of thirty, sixty and ninety feet. Evelyn's plan differed from Wren's chiefly in proposing a street from the church of St Dunstan's in the East to the St Paul's, and in having no quay or terrace along the river. These plans were not implemented, and the rebuilt city generally followed the streetplan of the old one, and most of it has survived into the 21st century.

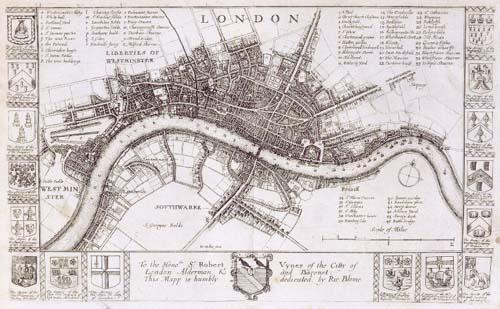
Richard Blome's map of London (1673). The development of the West End had recently begun to accelerate.

Nonetheless, the new City was different from the old one. Many aristocratic residents never returned, preferring to take new houses in the West End, where fashionable new districts such as St. James's were built close to the main royal residence, which was the Palace of Whitehall until it was destroyed by fire in the 1690s, and thereafter St. James's Palace. The rural lane of Piccadilly sprouted courtiers mansions such as Burlington House. Thus the separation between the middle class mercantile City of London, and the aristocratic world of the court in Westminster became complete.

In the City itself there was a move from wooden buildings to stone and brick construction to reduce the risk of fire. Parliament's Rebuilding of London Act 1666 stated "building with brick [is] not only more comely and durable, but also more safe against future perils of fire". From then on only doorcases, window-frames and shop fronts were allowed to be made of wood.

Christopher Wren's plan for a new model London came to nothing, but he was appointed to rebuild the ruined parish churches and to replace St Paul's Cathedral. His domed baroque cathedral was the primary symbol of London for at least a century and a half. As city surveyor, Robert Hooke oversaw the reconstruction of the city's houses. The East End, that is the area immediately to the east of the city walls, also became heavily populated in the decades after the Great Fire. London's docks began to extend downstream, attracting many working people who worked on the docks themselves and in the processing and distributive trades. These people lived in Whitechapel, Wapping, Stepney, and Limehouse, generally in slum conditions.

In the winter of 1683–1684, a frost fair was held on the Thames. The frost, which began about seven weeks before Christmas and continued for six weeks after, was the greatest on record. The Revocation of the Edict of Nantes in 1685 led to a large migration of Huguenots to London. They established a silk industry at Spitalfields.

At this time the Bank of England was founded, and the British East India Company was expanding its influence. Lloyd's of London also began to operate in the late 17th century. In 1700, London handled 80% of England's imports, 69% of its exports and 86% of its re-exports. Many of the goods were luxuries from the Americas and Asia such as silk, sugar, tea, and tobacco. The last figure emphasises London's role as an entrepot: while it had many craftsmen in the 17th century, and would later acquire some large factories, its economic prominence was never based primarily on industry. Instead it was a great trading and redistribution centre. Goods were brought to London by England's increasingly dominant merchant navy, not only to satisfy domestic demand, but also for re-export throughout Europe and beyond.

William III, a Dutchman, cared little for London, the smoke of which gave him asthma, and after the first fire at the Palace of Whitehall in 1691, he purchased Nottingham House and transformed it into Kensington Palace. Kensington was then an insignificant village, but the arrival of the court soon caused it to grow in importance. The palace was rarely favoured by future monarchs, but its construction was another step in the expansion of the bounds of London. During the same reign Greenwich Hospital, then well outside the boundary of London, but now comfortably inside it, was begun; it was the naval complement to the Chelsea Hospital for former soldiers, which had been founded in 1681. During the reign of Queen Anne an act was passed authorising the building of 50 new churches to serve the greatly increased population living outside the boundaries of the City of London.

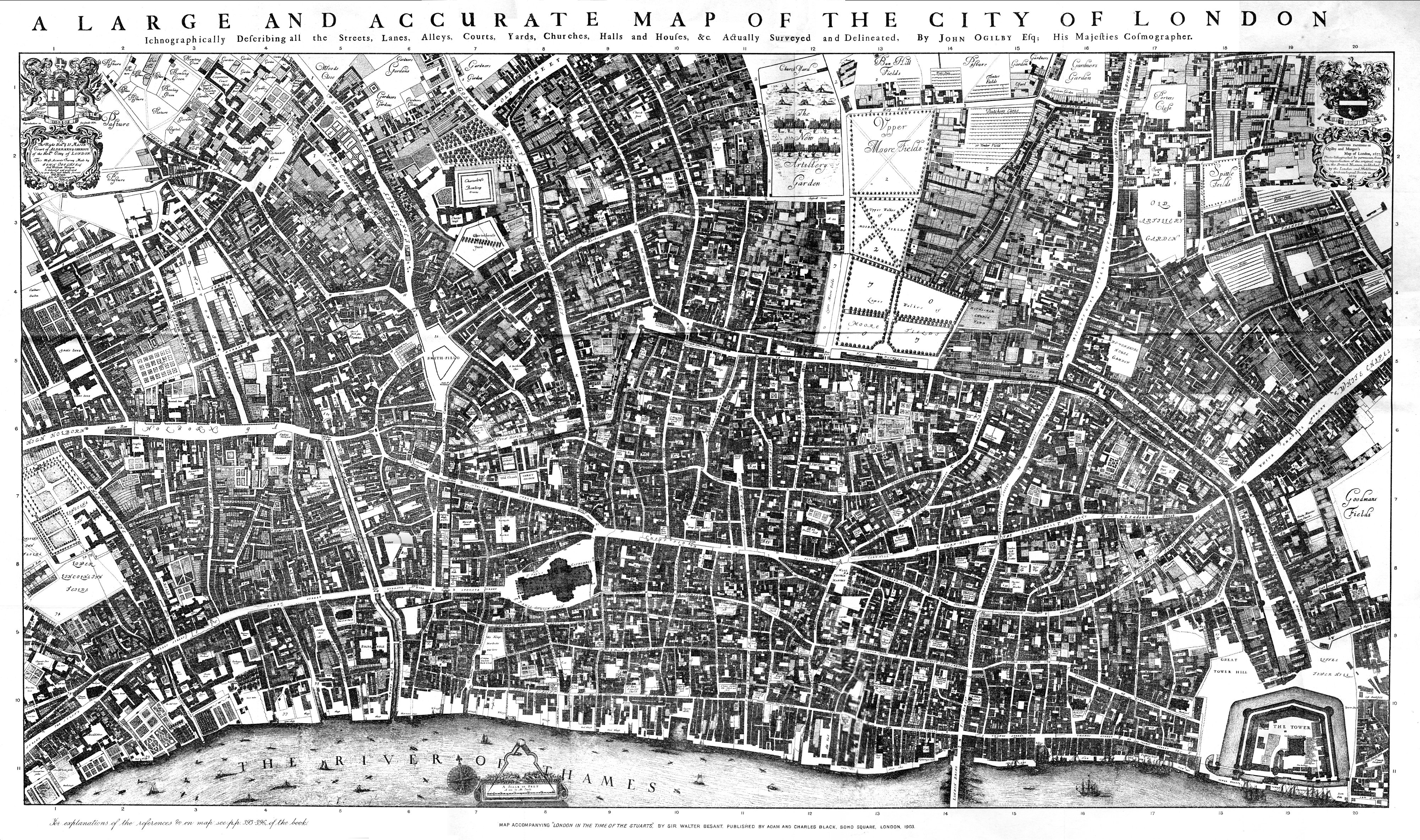
Ogilby & Morgan's map of the City of London (1673). "A Large and Accurate Map of the City of London. Ichnographically describing all the Streets, Lanes, Alleys, Courts, Yards, Churches, Halls, & Houses &c. Actually Surveyed and Delineated by John Ogilby, His Majesties Cosmographer."

=== 18th century ===
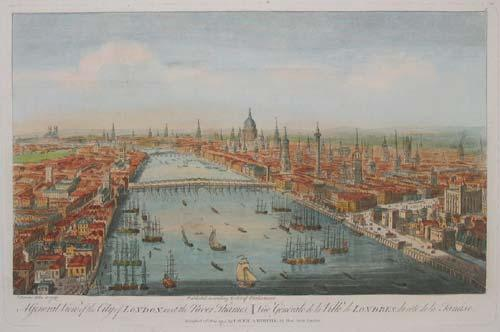
A view of London from the east in 1751

The 18th century was a period of rapid growth for London, reflecting an increasing national population, the early stirrings of the Industrial Revolution, and London's role at the centre of the evolving British Empire.

In 1707, an Act of Union was passed merging the Scottish and the English Parliaments, thus establishing the Kingdom of Great Britain. A year later, in 1708 Christopher Wren's masterpiece, St Paul's Cathedral was completed on his birthday. However, the first service had been held on 2 December 1697; more than 10 years earlier. This Cathedral replaced the original St. Paul's which had been completely destroyed by the Great Fire of London. This building is considered one of the finest in Britain and a fine example of Baroque architecture.

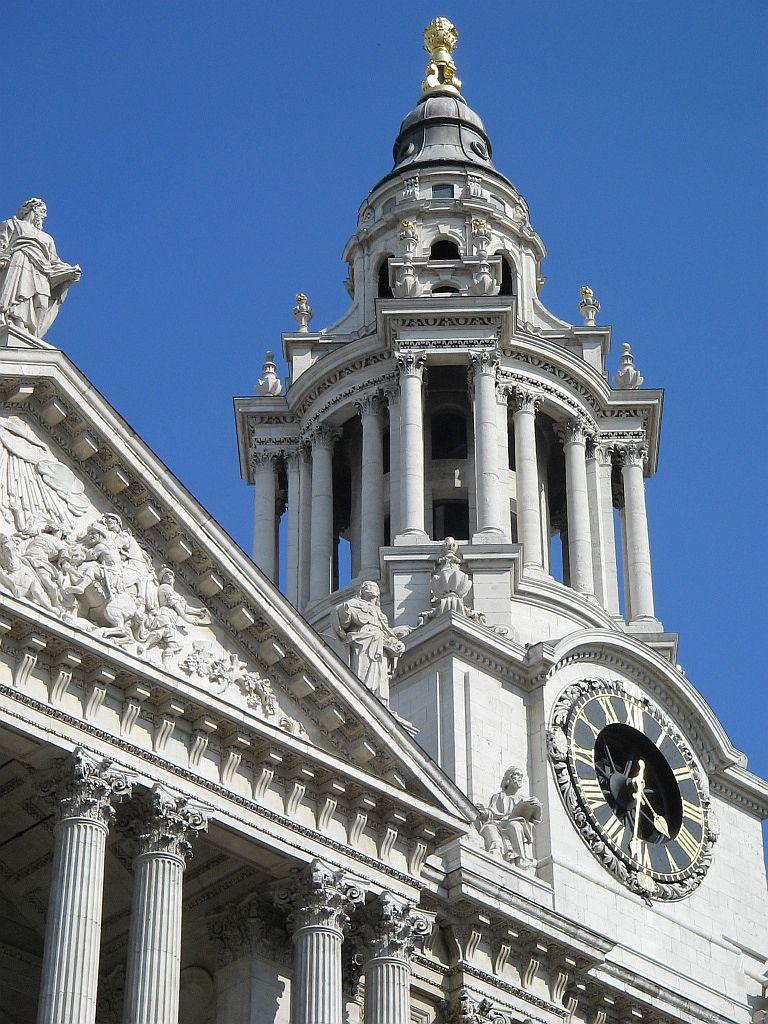
The Clock Tower of Wren's St Paul's Cathedral

Many tradesmen from different countries came to London to trade goods and merchandise. Also, more immigrants moved to London making the population greater. More people also moved to London for work and for business making London an altogether bigger and busier city. Britain's victory in the Seven Years' War increased the country's international standing and opened large new markets to British trade, further boosting London's prosperity.

During the Georgian period London spread beyond its traditional limits at an accelerating pace. This is shown in a series of detailed maps, particularly John Rocque's 1741–45 map (see below) and his 1746 Map of London. New districts such as Mayfair were built for the rich in the West End, new bridges over the Thames encouraged an acceleration of development in South London and in the East End, the Port of London expanded downstream from the city.

In 1780, the Tower of London held its only American prisoner, Henry Laurens, a former president of the Continental Congress and a Founding Father. In 1779, he was the Congress's representative of Holland, and got the country's support for the Revolution. On his return voyage back to America, he was captured by the Royal Navy and charged with treason after they had found evidence of a reason of war between Great Britain and the Netherlands. He was released from the Tower on 21 December 1781 in exchange for General Charles Cornwallis.

In 1762, King George III acquired Buckingham Palace (then called Buckingham House) from the Duke of Buckingham. It was enlarged over the next 75 years by architects including John Nash.

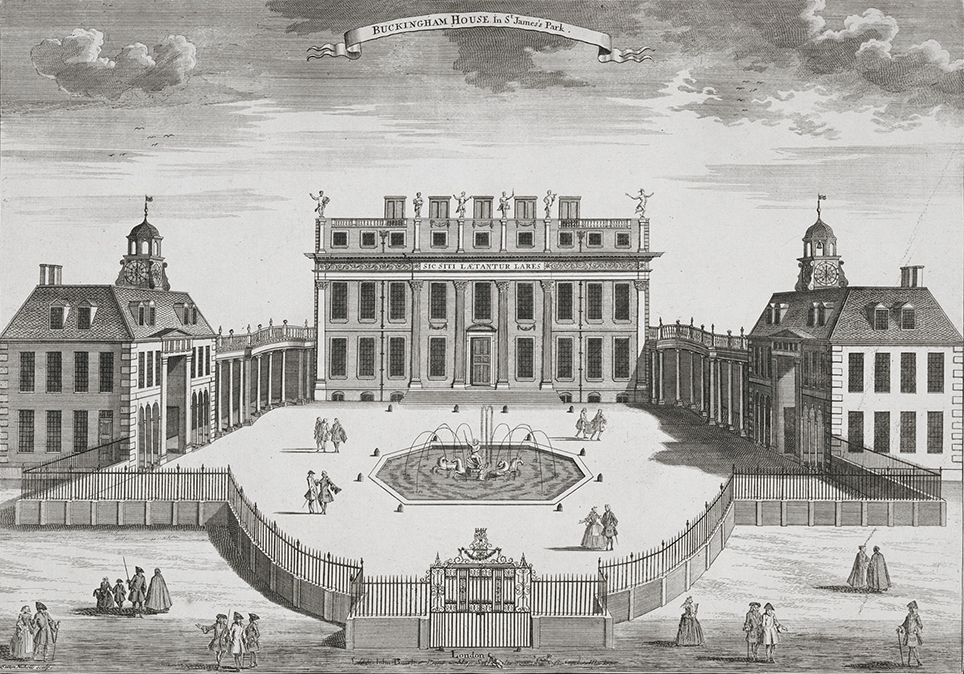
Buckingham Palace as it appeared in the 17th century

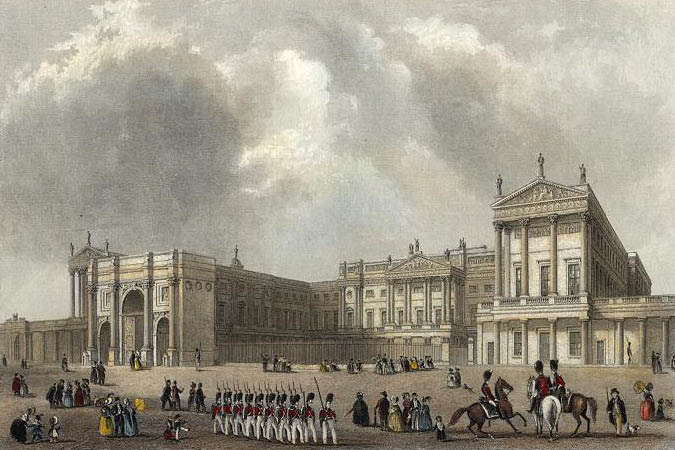
Buckingham Palace in 1837, enlarged by John Nash

A phenomenon of the era was the coffeehouse, which became a popular place to debate ideas. Growing literacy and the development of the printing press meant that news became widely available. Fleet Street became the centre of the embryonic national press during the century.

18th-century London was dogged by crime. The Bow Street Runners were established in 1750 as a professional police force. Penalties for crime were harsh, with the death penalty being applied for fairly minor crimes. Public hangings were common in London, and were popular public events.

In 1780, London was rocked by the Gordon Riots, an uprising by Protestants against Roman Catholic emancipation led by Lord George Gordon. Severe damage was caused to Catholic churches and homes, and 285 rioters were killed.

Up until 1750, London Bridge was the only crossing over the Thames, but in that year Westminster Bridge was opened and, for the first time in history, London Bridge, in a sense, had a rival. In 1798, Frankfurt banker Nathan Mayer Rothschild arrived in London and set up a banking house in the city, with a large sum of money given to him by his father, Amschel Mayer Rothschild. The Rothschilds also had banks in Paris and Vienna. The bank financed numerous large-scale projects, especially regarding railways around the world and the Suez Canal.

The 18th century saw the breakaway of the American colonies and many other unfortunate events in London, but also great change and Enlightenment. This all led into the beginning of modern times, the 19th century.

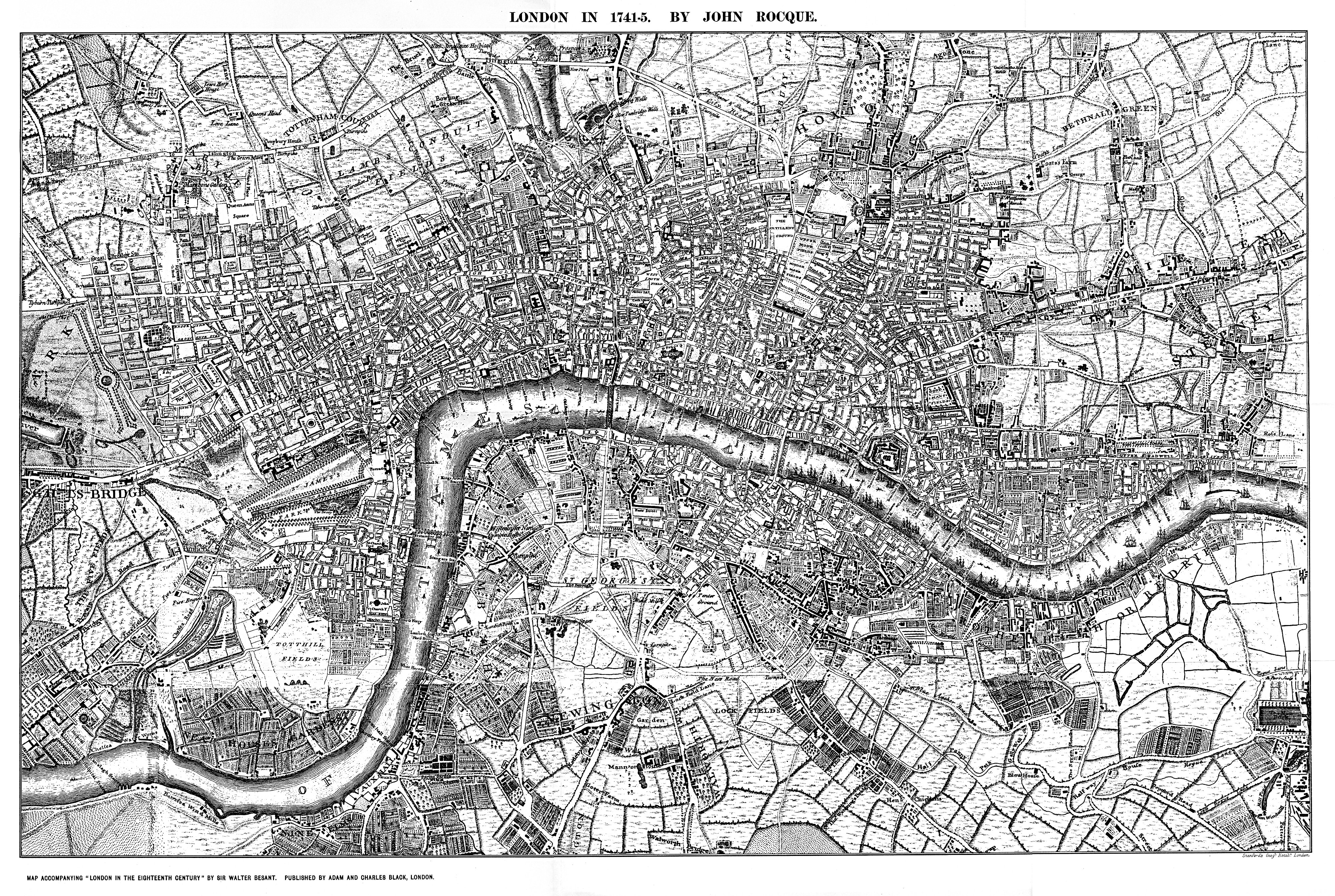
A detailed copy of John Rocque's Map of London, 1741–5

=== 19th century ===
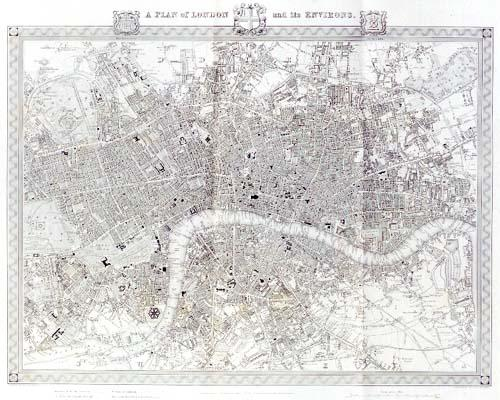
London as engraved by J. & C. Walker in 1845 from a map by R Creighton. Many districts in the West End were fully developed, and the East End also extended well beyond the eastern fringe of the City of London. There were now several bridges over the Thames, allowing the rapid development of South London.

During the 19th century, London was transformed into the world's largest city and capital of the British Empire. Its population expanded from 1 million in 1800 to 6.7 million a century later. During this period, London became a global political, financial, and trading capital. In this position, it was largely unrivalled until the latter part of the century, when Paris and New York City began to threaten its dominance.

While the city grew wealthy as Britain's holdings expanded, 19th-century London was also a city of poverty, where millions lived in overcrowded and unsanitary slums. Life for the poor was immortalised by Charles Dickens in such novels as Oliver Twist.

In 1829, the then Home Secretary (and future prime minister) Robert Peel established the Metropolitan Police as a police force covering the entire urban area. The force gained the nickname of "bobbies" or "peelers" named after Robert Peel.

19th-century London was transformed by the coming of the railways. A new network of metropolitan railways allowed for the development of suburbs in neighbouring counties from which middle-class and wealthy people could commute to the centre. While this spurred the massive outward growth of the city, the growth of greater London also exacerbated the class divide, as the wealthier classes emigrated to the suburbs, leaving the poor to inhabit the inner city areas.

The first railway to be built in London was a line from London Bridge to Greenwich, which opened in 1836. This was soon followed by the opening of great rail termini which eventually linked London to every corner of Great Britain, including Euston station (1837), Paddington station (1838), Fenchurch Street station (1841), Waterloo station (1848), King's Cross station (1850), and St Pancras station (1863). From 1863, the first lines of the London Underground were constructed.

The urbanised area continued to grow rapidly, spreading into Islington, Paddington, Belgravia, Holborn, Finsbury, Shoreditch, Southwark and Lambeth. Towards the middle of the century, London's antiquated local government system, consisting of ancient parishes and vestries, struggled to cope with the rapid growth in population. In 1855, the Metropolitan Board of Works (MBW) was created to provide London with adequate infrastructure to cope with its growth. One of its first tasks was addressing London's sanitation problems. At the time, raw sewage was pumped straight into the River Thames. This culminated in The Great Stink of 1858.

Parliament finally gave consent for the MBW to construct a large system of sewers. The engineer put in charge of building the new system was Joseph Bazalgette. In what was one of the largest civil engineering projects of the 19th century, he oversaw construction of over 2100 km of tunnels and pipes under London to take away sewage and provide clean drinking water. When the London sewerage system was completed, the death toll in London dropped dramatically, and epidemics of cholera and other diseases were curtailed. Bazalgette's system is still in use today.

One of the most famous events of 19th-century London was the Great Exhibition of 1851. Held at The Crystal Palace, the fair attracted 6 million visitors from across the world and displayed Britain at the height of its Imperial dominance.

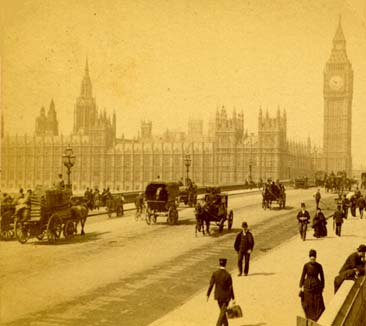
The Houses of Parliament from Westminster Bridge in the early 1890s

As the capital of a massive empire, London became a magnet for immigrants from the colonies and poorer parts of Europe. A large Irish population settled in the city during the Victorian period, with many of the newcomers refugees from the Great Famine (1845–1849). At one point, Catholic Irish made up about 20% of London's population; they typically lived in overcrowded slums. London also became home to a sizable Jewish community, which was notable for its entrepreneurship in the clothing trade and merchandising.

In 1888, the new County of London was established, administered by the London County Council. This was the first elected London-wide administrative body, replacing the earlier Metropolitan Board of Works, which had been made up of appointees. The County of London covered broadly what was then the full extent of the London conurbation, although the conurbation later outgrew the boundaries of the county. In 1900, the county was sub-divided into 28 metropolitan boroughs, which formed a more local tier of administration than the county council.

Many famous buildings and landmarks of London were constructed during the 19th century including:

- Trafalgar Square
- Big Ben and the Houses of Parliament
- The Royal Albert Hall
- The Victoria and Albert Museum
- Tower Bridge

=== 20th century ===
==== 1900 to 1939 ====
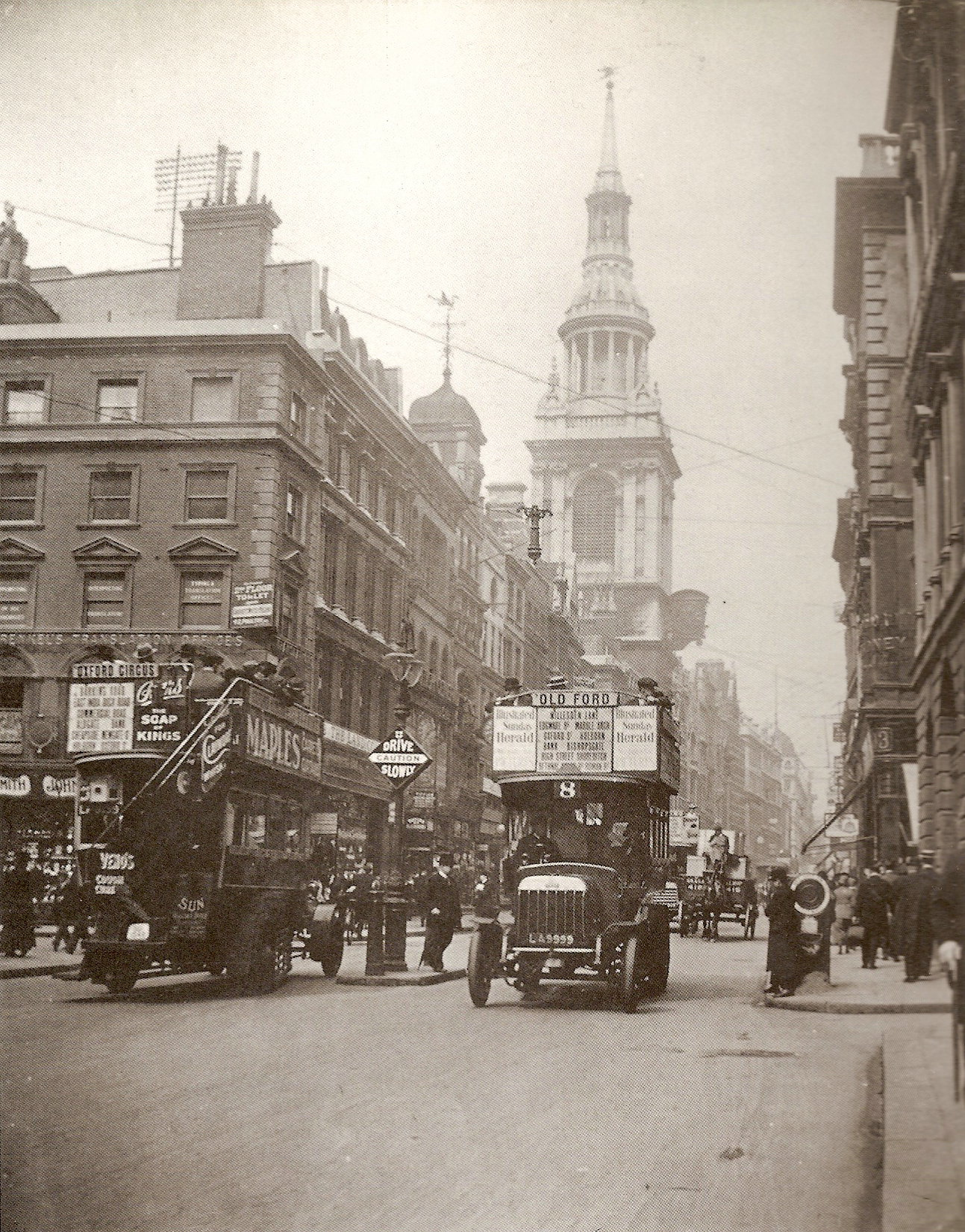
Cheapside pictured in 1909, with the church of St Mary-le-Bow in the background

London entered the 20th century at the height of its influence as the capital of one of the largest empires in history, but the new century was to bring many challenges.

London's population continued to grow rapidly in the early decades of the century, and public transport was greatly expanded. A large tram network was constructed by the London County Council, through the LCC Tramways; the first motorbus service began in the 1900s. Improvements to London's overground and underground rail network, including large scale electrification were progressively carried out.

During World War I, London experienced its first bombing raids carried out by German zeppelin airships; these killed around 700 people and caused great terror, but were merely a foretaste of what was to come. The city of London would experience many more terrors as a result of both World Wars. The largest explosion in London occurred during World War I: the Silvertown explosion, when a munitions factory containing 50 tons of TNT exploded, killing 73 and injuring 400.

The period between the two World Wars saw London's geographical extent growing more quickly than ever before or since. A preference for lower density suburban housing, typically semi-detached, by Londoners seeking a more "rural" lifestyle, superseded Londoners' old predilection for terraced houses. This was facilitated not only by a continuing expansion of the rail network, including trams and the Underground, but also by slowly widening car ownership. London's suburbs expanded outside the boundaries of the County of London, into the neighbouring counties of Essex, Hertfordshire, Kent, Middlesex, and Surrey.

Like the rest of the country, London suffered severe unemployment during the Great Depression of the 1930s. In the East End during the 1930s, politically extreme parties of both right and left flourished. The Communist Party of Great Britain and the British Union of Fascists both gained serious support. Clashes between right and left culminated in the Battle of Cable Street in 1936. The population of London reached an all-time peak of 8.6 million in 1939.

Large numbers of Jewish immigrants fleeing from Nazi Germany settled in London during the 1930s, mostly in the East End.

The Labour Party politician Herbert Morrison was a dominant figure in local government in the 1920s and 1930s. He became mayor of Hackney and a member of the London County Council in 1922, and for a while was Minister of Transport in Ramsay MacDonald's cabinet. When Labour gained power in London in 1934, Morrison unified the bus, tram and trolleybus services with the Underground, by the creation of the London Passenger Transport Board (known as London Transport) in 1933., He led the effort to finance and build the new Waterloo Bridge. He designed the Metropolitan Green Belt around the suburbs and worked to clear slums, build schools, and reform public assistance.

==== In World War II ====
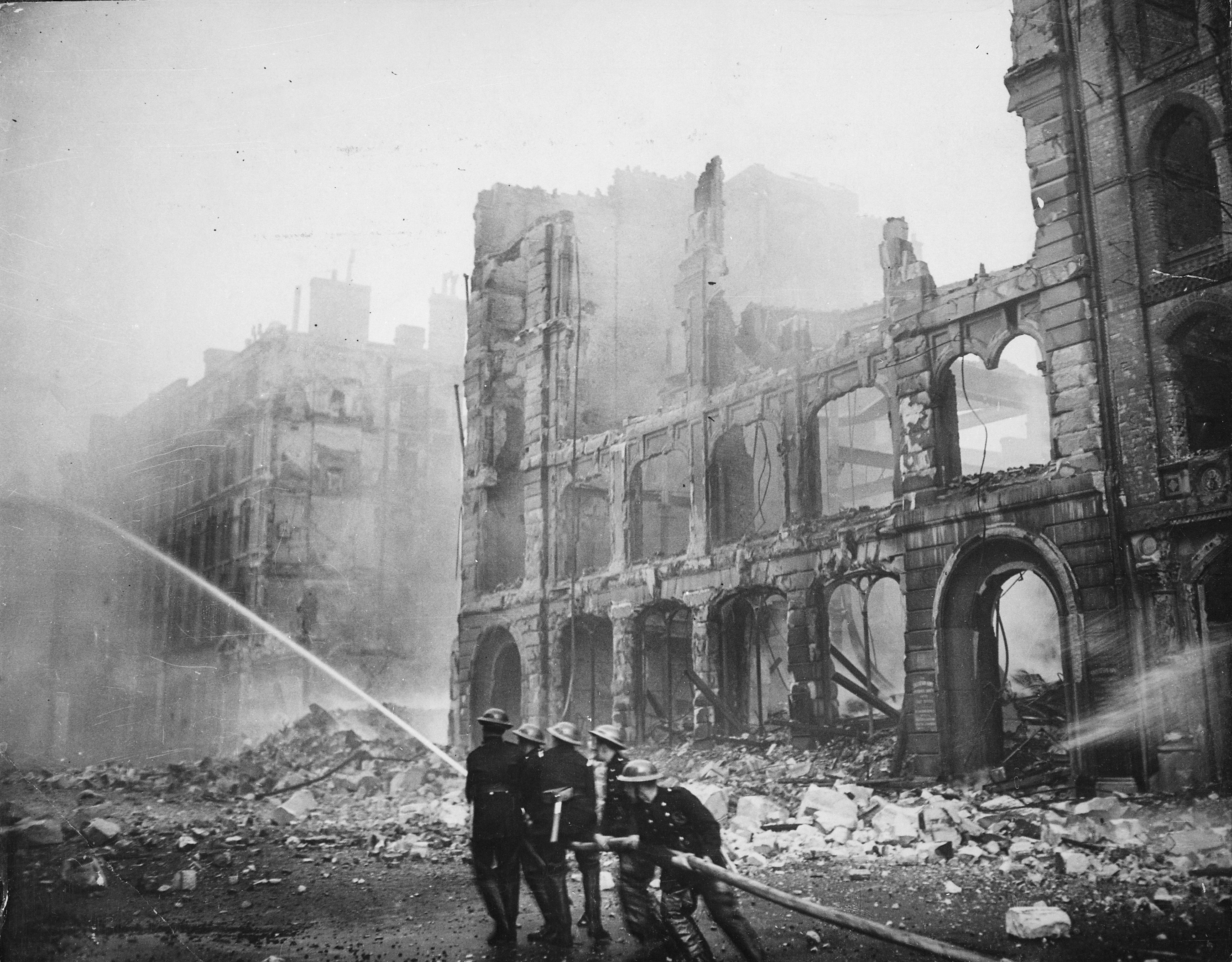
Firefighters putting out flames after an air raid during The Blitz, 1941

During World War II, London, as many other British cities, suffered severe damage, being bombed extensively by the Luftwaffe as a part of the Blitz. Prior to the bombing, hundreds of thousands of children in London were evacuated to the countryside to avoid the bombing. Civilians took shelter from the air raids in underground stations.

The heaviest bombing took place during The Blitz between 7 September 1940 and 10 May 1941. During this period, London was subjected to 71 separate raids receiving over 18,000 tonnes of high explosive. One raid in December 1940, which became known as the Second Great Fire of London, saw a firestorm engulf much of the City of London and destroy many historic buildings. St Paul's Cathedral, however, remained unscathed; a photograph showing the cathedral shrouded in smoke became a famous image of the war.

Having failed to defeat Britain, Adolf Hitler, the dictator of Nazi Germany, turned his attention to the Eastern front and regular bombing raids ceased. They began again, but on a smaller scale with the "Little Blitz" in early 1944. Towards the end of the war, during 1944/45 London again came under heavy attack by pilotless V-1 flying bombs and V-2 rockets, which were fired from Nazi occupied Europe. These attacks only came to an end when their launch sites were captured by advancing Allied forces.

London suffered severe damage and heavy casualties, the worst hit part being the Docklands area. By the war's end, just under 30,000 Londoners had been killed by the bombing, and over 50,000 seriously injured, tens of thousands of buildings were destroyed, and hundreds of thousands of people were made homeless.

==== 1945–2000 ====
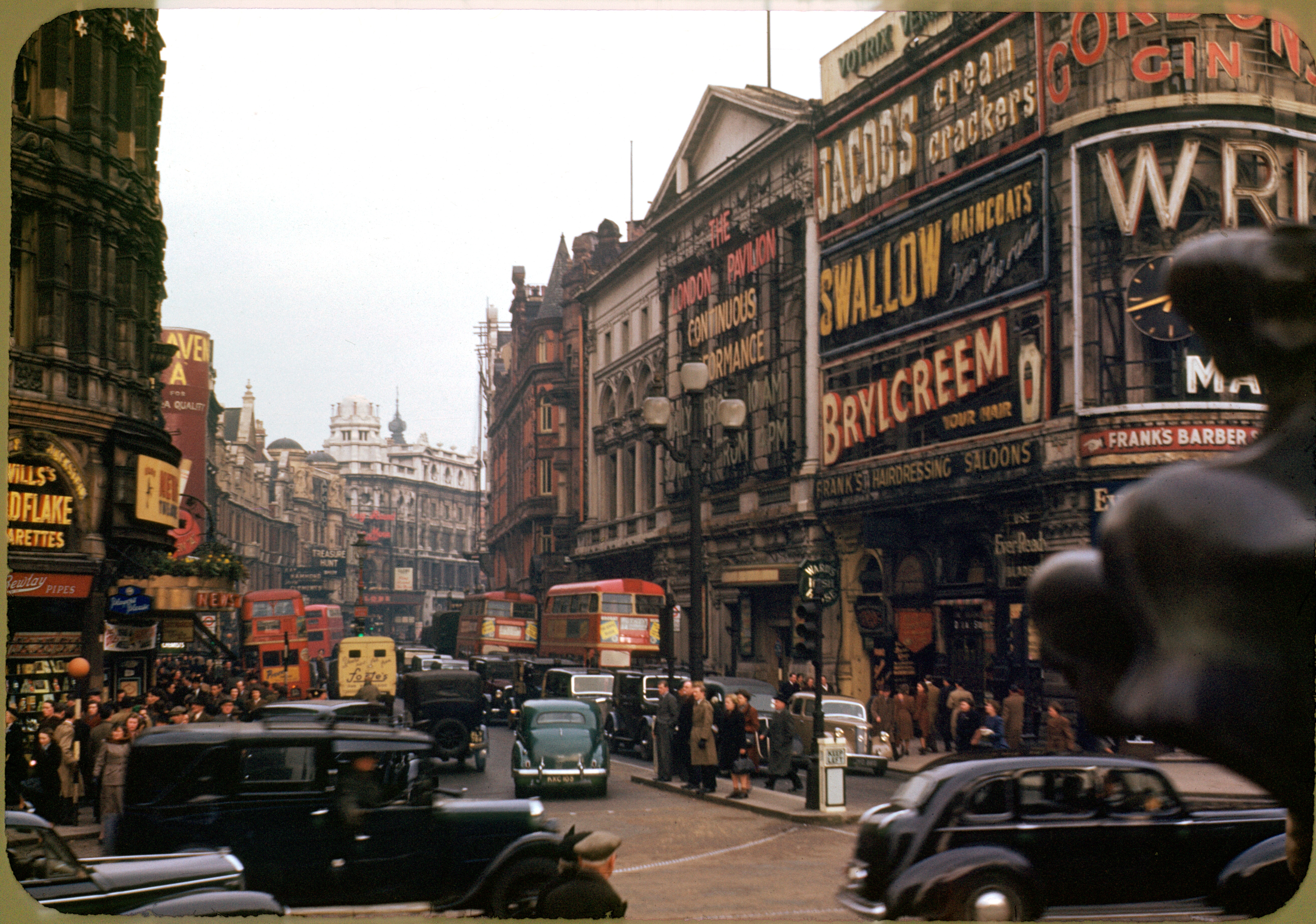
Shaftesbury Avenue, c. 1949

Three years after the war, the 1948 Summer Olympics were held at the original Wembley Stadium, at a time when the city had barely recovered from the war. London's rebuilding was slow to begin. However, in 1951 the Festival of Britain was held, which marked an increasing mood of optimism and forward looking.

In the immediate postwar years housing was a major issue in London, due to the large amount of housing which had been destroyed in the war. The authorities decided upon high-rise blocks of flats as the answer to housing shortages. During the 1950s and 1960s the skyline of London altered dramatically as tower blocks were erected, although these later proved unpopular. In a bid to reduce the number of people living in overcrowded housing, a policy was introduced of encouraging people to move into newly built new towns surrounding London. Living standards also rose, with real earnings rising by approximately 70% in the 20 years after the end of the war.

Through the 19th and in the early half of the 20th century, Londoners used coal for heating their homes, which produced large amounts of smoke. In combination with climatic conditions this often caused a characteristic smog, and London became known for its typical "London Fog", also known as "Pea Soupers". London was sometimes referred to as "The Smoke" because of this. In 1952, this culminated in the disastrous Great Smog of 1952 which lasted for five days and killed between 10,000 and 12,000 people (according to modern estimates; government estimates at the time put the death toll at 4,000). In response to this, the Clean Air Act 1956 was passed, mandating the creating of "smokeless zones" where the use of "smokeless" fuels was required (this was at a time when most households still used open fires); the Act was effective.

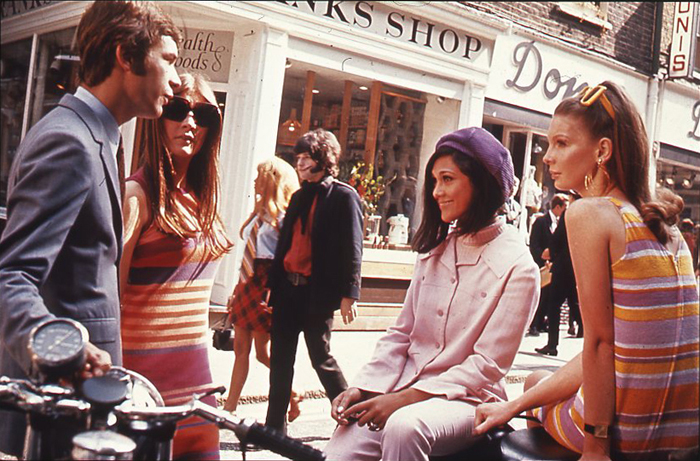
Young people in Carnaby Street in 1966

Starting in the mid-1960s, and partly as a result of the success of such musicians as the Beatles and the Rolling Stones, London became a centre for the worldwide youth culture, exemplified by the Swinging London subculture which made Carnaby Street a household name of youth fashion around the world. London's role as a trendsetter for youth fashion continued strongly in the 1980s during the new wave and punk eras and into the mid-1990s with the emergence of the Britpop era.

From the 1950s onwards London experienced an increase in immigration, largely from Commonwealth countries such as Jamaica, India, Bangladesh and Pakistan. However, the integration of the new immigrants was not always easy. Racial tensions emerged in events such as the Brixton Riots between 10 and 12 April 1981 in the early 1980s.

From the beginning of "The Troubles" in Northern Ireland in the early 1970s until the mid-1990s, London was subjected to repeated terrorist attacks by the Provisional IRA.

The outward expansion of London was slowed by the war, and the introduction of the Metropolitan Green Belt. Due to this outward expansion, in 1965 the old County of London (which by now only covered part of the London conurbation) and the London County Council were abolished, and the much larger area of Greater London was established with a new Greater London Council (GLC) to administer it, along with 32 new London boroughs.

Greater London's population declined steadily in the decades after World War II, from an estimated peak of 8.6 million in 1939 to around 6.8 million in the 1980s. However, it then began to increase again in the late 1980s, encouraged by strong economic performance and an increasingly positive image.

London's traditional status as a major port declined dramatically in the post-war decades as the old Docklands could not accommodate large modern container ships. The principal ports for London moved downstream to the ports of Felixstowe and Tilbury. The docklands area had become largely derelict by the 1980s, but was redeveloped into flats and offices from the mid-1980s onwards. The Thames Barrier was completed in the 1980s to protect London against tidal surges from the North Sea.

In the early 1980s political disputes between the GLC run by Ken Livingstone and the Conservative Party government of Margaret Thatcher led to the GLC's abolition in 1986, with most of its powers relegated to the London boroughs. This left London as the only large metropolis in the world without a central administration.

In 2000, London-wide government was restored, with the creation of the Greater London Authority (GLA) by Tony Blair's government, covering the same area of Greater London. The new authority had similar powers to the old GLC, but was made up of a directly elected Mayor and a London Assembly. The first election took place on 4 May, with Ken Livingstone comfortably regaining his previous post, becoming first elected mayor of London. London was recognised as one of the nine regions of England. In global perspective, it was emerging as a World city widely compared to New York City and Tokyo.

=== 21st century ===
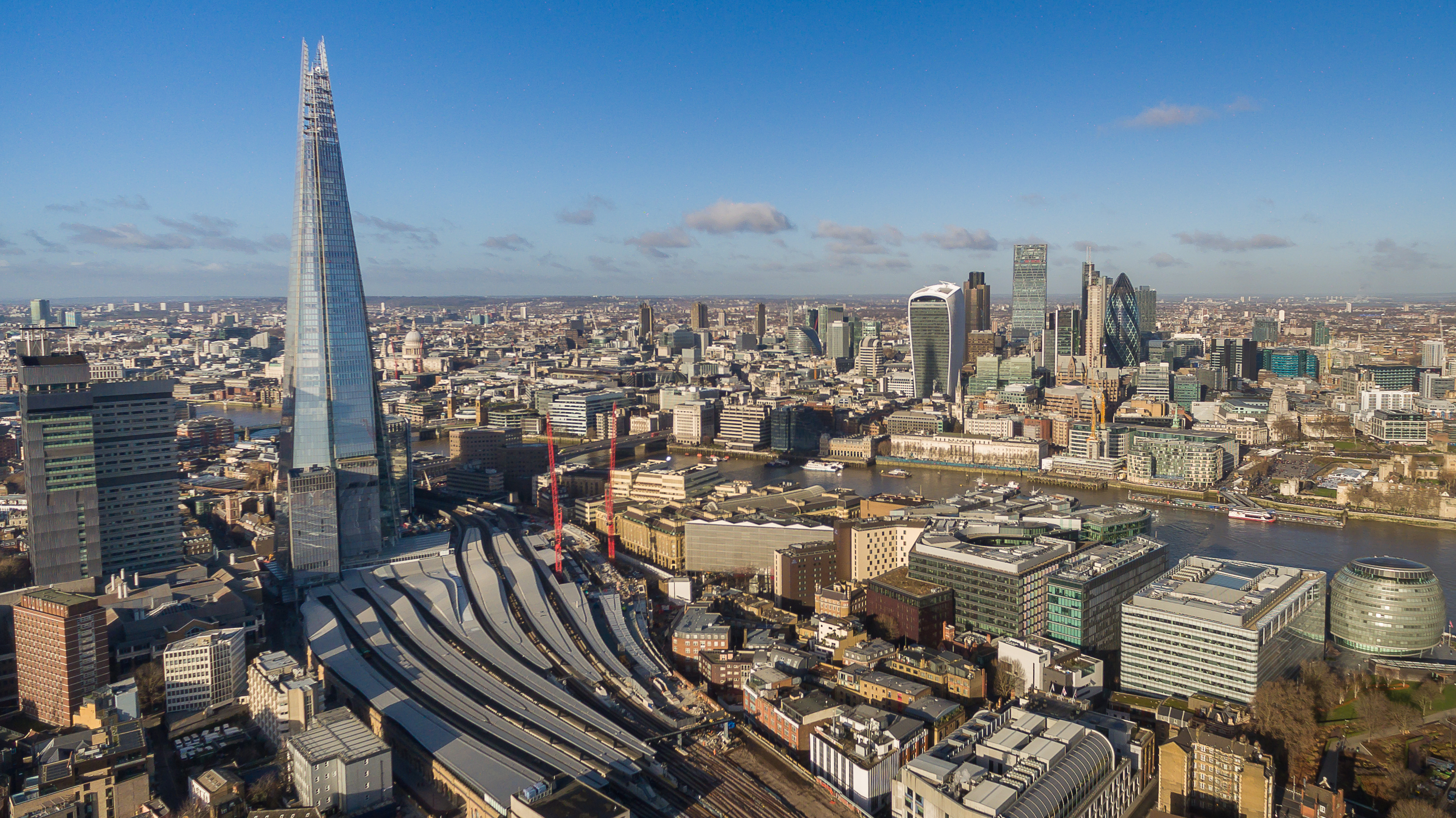
The Shard (left), an icon of 21st-century London

Around the start of the 21st century, London hosted the much-derided Millennium Dome at Greenwich, to mark the new century. Other Millennium projects were more successful. One was the largest observation wheel in the world, the "Millennium Wheel", or the London Eye, which was erected as a temporary structure, but soon became a fixture, and draws four million visitors a year. The National Lottery also released a flood of funds for major enhancements to existing attractions, for example the roofing of the Great Court at the British Museum.

The London Plan, published by the Mayor of London in 2004, estimated that the population would reach 8.1 million by 2016, and continue to rise thereafter. This was reflected in a move towards denser, more urban styles of building, including a greatly increased number of tall buildings, and proposals for major enhancements to the public transport network. However, funding for projects such as Crossrail remained a struggle.

On 6 July 2005 London won the right to host the 2012 Olympics and Paralympics, making it the first city to host the modern games three times. However, celebrations were cut short the following day when the city was rocked by a series of terrorist attacks. More than 50 were killed and 750 injured in three bombings on London Underground trains and a fourth on a double decker bus near King's Cross.

London was the starting point for countrywide riots which occurred in August 2011, when thousands of people rioted in several city boroughs and in towns across England. They were the biggest riots in modern English history. In 2011, the population grew over 8 million people for the first time in decades. White British formed less than half of the population for the first time.

There was some ambivalence among the public leading up to the 2012 Summer Olympics in the city, though public sentiment changed strongly in their favour following a successful opening ceremony and when the anticipated organisational and transport problems never occurred.

Boris Johnson, later Prime Minister, was elected Mayor of London in May 2008 and re-elected in 2012. He was succeeded by Sadiq Khan, the first Muslim mayor of a major Western capital city, who was elected in 2016, was re-elected in 2021, and won a historic third term in 2024.

In the 2016 United Kingdom European Union membership referendum, London was the only region in England, where Remain won the highest share of the vote. The voter turnout was the highest in London since the 1950 general election. However, Britain's exit from the European Union (EU) in early 2020 (Brexit) only marginally weakened London's position as an international financial center (IFC).

In 2022, the Elizabeth line railway opened, connecting Heathrow and Reading to Shenfield and Abbey Wood through a tunnel in the city between Paddington and Liverpool Street, revolutionising east–west travel in London.

On 6 May 2023, the coronation of King Charles III and Queen Camilla as King and Queen of the United Kingdom and the other Commonwealth realms took place at Westminster Abbey.

As of 9 May 2023, London had received around 18,000 refugees from Ukraine, because of the 2022 Russian invasion of Ukraine.

=== Population ===
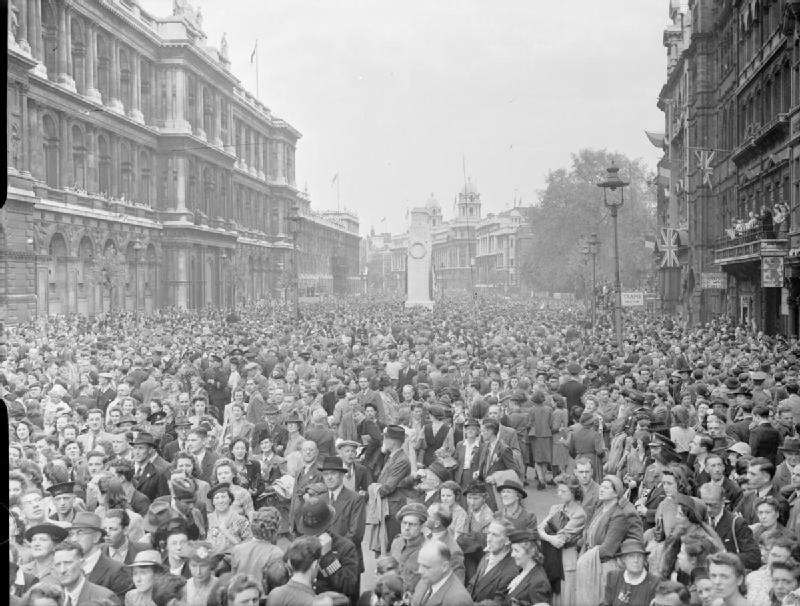
People gathered in Whitehall to hear Winston Churchill's victory speech, 8 May 1945.

Year	Population
1	1–A few farmers
50	50– 100
140	45– 60,000
300	10– 20,000
800	10– 12,000
1000	20– 25,000
1100	10– 20,000
1200	20– 25,000
1300	80– 100,000
1350	25– 50,000
1500	50– 100,000
1550	120,000
1600	200,000
1650	350,000– 400,000
1700	550,000– 600,000
1750	700,000
1801	959,300
1831	1,655,000
1851	2,363,000
1891	5,572,012
1901	6,506,954
1911	7,160,525
1921	7,386,848
1931	8,110,480
1939	8,615,245
1951	8,196,978
1961	7,992,616
1971	7,452,520
1981	6,805,000
1991	6,829,300
2001	7,322,400
2006	7,657,300
2011	8,174,100
2015	8,615,246

== Historical sites of note ==
- Alexandra Palace
- Battersea Power Station
- Buckingham Palace
- Croydon Airport
- Hyde Park
- Monument to the Great Fire of London
- Palace of Westminster
- Parliament Hill
- Royal Observatory, Greenwich
- St Paul's Cathedral
- Tower Bridge
- Tower of London
- Tyburn
- Vauxhall station
- Waterloo International station
- Westminster Abbey

== Collections ==
=== Museums ===
The London Museum holds over 7 million objects in its collections relating to the history of the city.

=== Libraries and Archives ===
- The collections of the London Archives focus exclusively on the history of London.
- Senate House Library's Bromhead Collection contains about 4000 books relating to the history of London.
- University College London Special Collections has a collection of around 3000 books relating to the history of London.

== See also ==
- Ale silver
- Economy of London
- Culture of London
- Fortifications of London
- Geography of London
- Geology of London
- History of local government in London
- Timeline of London
