= Listed buildings in Braintree District =

Listed buildings in Essex, England

There are around 3,200 listed buildings in the Braintree District, which are buildings of architectural or historic interest.

- Grade I buildings are of exceptional interest.
- Grade II* buildings are particularly important buildings of more than special interest.
- Grade II buildings are of special interest.

The lists follow Historic England’s geographical organisation, with entries grouped by county, local authority, and parish (civil and non-civil). The following lists are arranged by parish.

Parish	List of listed buildings	Grade I	Grade II*	Grade II	Total
Alphamstone	Listed buildings in Alphamstone				
Ashen	Listed buildings in Ashen, Essex				
Belchamp Otten	Listed buildings in Belchamp Otten				
Belchamp St Paul	Listed buildings in Belchamp St Paul				
Belchamp Walter	Listed buildings in Belchamp Walter				
Birdbrook	Listed buildings in Birdbrook				
Black Notley	Listed buildings in Black Notley				
Borley	Listed buildings in Borley				
Bradwell	Listed buildings in Bradwell				
Braintree (non-civil parish)	Listed buildings in Braintree				
Bulmer	Listed buildings in Bulmer, Essex				
Bures Hamlet	Listed buildings in Bures Hamlet				
Castle Hedingham	Listed buildings in Castle Hedingham				
Coggeshall	Listed buildings in Coggeshall				
Colne Engaine	Listed buildings in Colne Engaine				
Cressing	Listed buildings in Cressing				
Earls Colne	Listed buildings in Earls Colne				
Fairstead	Listed buildings in Fairstead, Essex				
Faulkbourne	Listed buildings in Faulkbourne				
Feering	Listed buildings in Feering				
Finchingfield	Listed buildings in Finchingfield				
Foxearth	Listed buildings in Foxearth				
Gestingthorpe	Listed buildings in Gestingthorpe				
Gosfield	Listed buildings in Gosfield				
Great Bardfield	Listed buildings in Great Bardfield				
Great Henny	Listed buildings in Great Henny				
Great Maplestead	Listed buildings in Great Maplestead				
Great Notley	Listed buildings in Great Notley				
Great Yeldham	Listed buildings in Great Yeldham				
Greenstead Green and Halstead Rural	Listed buildings in Greenstead Green and Halstead Rural				
Halstead	Listed buildings in Halstead				
Hatfield Peverel	Listed buildings in Hatfield Peverel				
Helions Bumpstead	Listed buildings in Helions Bumpstead				
Kelvedon	Listed buildings in Kelvedon				
Lamarsh	Listed buildings in Lamarsh				
Liston	Listed buildings in Liston, Essex				
Little Henny	Listed buildings in Little Henny				
Little Maplestead	Listed buildings in Little Maplestead				
Little Yeldham	Listed buildings in Little Yeldham				
Middleton	Listed buildings in Middleton, Essex				
Ovington	Listed buildings in Ovington, Essex				
Panfield	Listed buildings in Panfield				
Pebmarsh	Listed buildings in Pebmarsh				
Pentlow	Listed buildings in Pentlow				
Rayne	Listed buildings in Rayne, Essex				
Ridgewell	Listed buildings in Ridgewell				
Rivenhall	Listed buildings in Rivenhall				
Shalford	Listed buildings in Shalford, Essex				
Sible Hedingham	Listed buildings in Sible Hedingham				
Silver End	Listed buildings in Silver End				
Stambourne	Listed buildings in Stambourne				
Steeple Bumpstead	Listed buildings in Steeple Bumpstead				
Stisted	Listed buildings in Stisted				
Sturmer	Listed buildings in Sturmer				
Terling	Listed buildings in Terling				
The Salings	Listed buildings in The Salings				
Tilbury Juxta Clare	Listed buildings in Tilbury Juxta Clare				
Toppesfield	Listed buildings in Toppesfield				
Twinstead	Listed buildings in Twinstead				
Wethersfield	Listed buildings in Wethersfield, Essex				
White Colne	Listed buildings in White Colne				
White Notley	Listed buildings in White Notley				
Wickham St Paul	Listed buildings in Wickham St Paul				
Witham	Listed buildings in Witham				

== See also ==
- Grade I listed buildings in Essex
- Grade II* listed buildings in Essex

== Sources ==
- Bettley, James; Pevsner, Nikolaus (2007) [1954], Essex, The Buildings of England, New Haven and London: Yale University Press, ISBN 978-0-300-11614-4
