= Listed buildings in Witham =

Civil Parish in Essex, England

Witham is a town and civil parish in the Braintree District of Essex, England. It contains 99 listed buildings that are recorded in the National Heritage List for England. Of these one is grade I, nine are grade II* and 89 are grade II.

This list is based on the information retrieved online from Historic England.

== Key ==
Grade	Criteria
I	Buildings that are of exceptional interest
II*	Particularly important buildings of more than special interest
II	Buildings that are of special interest

== Listing ==
Name	Grade	Location	Type	Completed (Note: The date given is the date used by Historic England as significant for the initial building or that of an important part in the structure's description.)	Date designated	Grid ref. (Note: The grid reference is based on the British national grid reference system, sometimes known as OSGB36, used by the Ordnance Survey.) Geo-coordinates	Notes	Entry number (Note: The "List Entry Number" is a unique number assigned to each listed building and scheduled monument by Historic England.)	Image	Wikidata
War Memorial	II		war memorial		12 October 2004	TL8231614798; 51°48′08″N 0°38′34″E		1431201	War Memorial More images	Q26677699
Blunt's Hall	II	Blunts Hall Road			7 February 1973	TL8084714297; 51°47′53″N 0°37′17″E		1122634	Upload Photo	Q26415755
Cuppers Farmhouse	II	19, Blunts Hall Road			10 March 1980	TL8132714311; 51°47′53″N 0°37′42″E		1122563	Upload Photo	Q26415710
Croft House	II	10, Bridge Street			7 February 1973	TL8180214112; 51°47′46″N 0°38′06″E		1338233	Upload Photo	Q26622576
12, Bridge Street	II	12, Bridge Street			7 February 1973	TL8179814107; 51°47′46″N 0°38′06″E		1122603	Upload Photo	Q26414393
23-27, Bridge Street	II*	23-27, Bridge Street			1 March 1950	TL8182114103; 51°47′46″N 0°38′07″E		1122602	Upload Photo	Q17557173
Bridge House	II	28, Bridge Street			7 February 1973	TL8177114076; 51°47′45″N 0°38′04″E		1338234	Upload Photo	Q26622577
Church of St Nicolas	I	Chipping Hill	church building		1 March 1950	TL8172915378; 51°48′27″N 0°38′05″E		1338236	Church of St Nicolas More images	Q17536287
Chipping Hill Bridge	II	Chippinghill			7 February 1973	TL8157715338; 51°48′26″N 0°37′57″E		1306483	Upload Photo	Q26593259
The Vicarage	II	Chippinghill			7 February 1973	TL8168515398; 51°48′28″N 0°38′02″E		1169552	Upload Photo	Q26462745
Recess	II	14, Chippinghill			7 February 1973	TL8185215260; 51°48′23″N 0°38′11″E		1169527	Upload Photo	Q26462721
Bramstons	II	16, Chippinghill			7 February 1973	TL8183415269; 51°48′23″N 0°38′10″E		1122605	Upload Photo	Q26414394
Smithy	II	18, Chippinghill			1 March 1950	TL8178315292; 51°48′24″N 0°38′07″E		1306501	Upload Photo	Q26593274
20 and 22, Chippinghill	II	20 and 22, Chippinghill			1 March 1950	TL8177215295; 51°48′24″N 0°38′07″E		1338235	Upload Photo	Q26622578
26-30, Chippinghill	II	26-30, Chippinghill			1 March 1950	TL8171915334; 51°48′26″N 0°38′04″E		1122606	Upload Photo	Q26414395
Barnardiston	II	35, Chippinghill			1 March 1950	TL8178415245; 51°48′23″N 0°38′07″E		1122607	Upload Photo	Q26414396
43 and 45, Chippinghill	II	43 and 45, Chippinghill			1 March 1950	TL8173615275; 51°48′24″N 0°38′05″E		1169559	Upload Photo	Q26462750
51-55, Chippinghill	II	51-55, Chippinghill			1 March 1950	TL8172215284; 51°48′24″N 0°38′04″E		1338197	Upload Photo	Q26622543
Mortimers	II	1 and 3, Church Street			1 March 1950	TL8176115321; 51°48′25″N 0°38′06″E		1169542	Upload Photo	Q26462734
White Horse Public House	II	2, Church Street	pub		7 February 1973	TL8180115284; 51°48′24″N 0°38′08″E		1306449	White Horse Public House More images	Q26593229
4 and 6, Church Street	II	4 and 6, Church Street			7 February 1973	TL8179815299; 51°48′24″N 0°38′08″E		1122609	Upload Photo	Q26414398
Woolpack Inn	II	7, Church Street	pub		7 February 1973	TL8175315423; 51°48′28″N 0°38′06″E		1169576	Woolpack Inn More images	Q26462763
11, Church Street	II	11, Church Street			1 March 1950	TL8174215488; 51°48′31″N 0°38′05″E		1122608	Upload Photo	Q26414397
24 and 26, Church Street	II	24 and 26, Church Street			1 March 1950	TL8178415350; 51°48′26″N 0°38′07″E		1122610	Upload Photo	Q26414399
28-40, Church Street	II	28-40, Church Street			1 March 1950	TL8177915376; 51°48′27″N 0°38′07″E		1306450	Upload Photo	Q26593230
42-48, Church Street	II	42-48, Church Street			7 February 1973	TL8178015435; 51°48′29″N 0°38′07″E		1122611	Upload Photo	Q26414400
54a and 54, Church Street	II	54a and 54, Church Street			7 February 1973	TL8176815488; 51°48′31″N 0°38′07″E		1169588	Upload Photo	Q26462775
All Saints Church	II	Guithavon Street, CM8 1BN	church building		18 February 1988	TL8193314585; 51°48′01″N 0°38′14″E		1122533	All Saints Church More images	Q26415685
1, Guithavon Street	II	1, Guithavon Street			1 March 1950	TL8204014494; 51°47′58″N 0°38′19″E		1306426	Upload Photo	Q26593208
3-17, Guithavon Street	II	3-17, Guithavon Street			7 February 1973	TL8197814516; 51°47′59″N 0°38′16″E		1244823	Upload Photo	Q26537403
Beau Manor Old Mill House	II	Guithavon Valley			7 February 1973	TL8172614645; 51°48′03″N 0°38′03″E		1306431	Upload Photo	Q26593213
Bridge Hospital	II	Hatfield Road			7 February 1973	TL8162213950; 51°47′41″N 0°37′56″E		1338198	Upload Photo	Q26622544
Ivy Chimneys	II	Hatfield Road			7 February 1973	TL8133113618; 51°47′31″N 0°37′41″E		1122615	Upload Photo	Q26414404
Howbridge Hall	II	Howbridge Road			1 March 1950	TL8201513826; 51°47′36″N 0°38′17″E		1306434	Upload Photo	Q26593216
House at Rear of White Hart Hotel White Hart Hotel	II	Maldon Road	house		7 February 1973	TL8215714542; 51°47′59″N 0°38′25″E		1122589	House at Rear of White Hart Hotel White Hart Hotel More images	Q26415734
Sauls Bridge	II	Maldon Road			15 May 1985	TL8244813895; 51°47′38″N 0°38′39″E		1264929	Upload Photo	Q26555566
27, Maldon Road	II	27, Maldon Road			7 February 1973	TL8224214446; 51°47′56″N 0°38′30″E		1122616	Upload Photo	Q26414405
Jacksons Farm	II	Maltings Lane			20 April 1993	TL8154213522; 51°47′27″N 0°37′51″E		1235771	Upload Photo	Q26529071
Malthouse (warehouse)	II	Maltings Lane			7 February 1973	TL8153513556; 51°47′28″N 0°37′51″E		1169656	Upload Photo	Q26462835
Nitrovit Limited	II	Maltings Lane			16 April 1985	TL8223714544; 51°47′59″N 0°38′30″E		1338218	Upload Photo	Q26622563
High House	II*	Newland Street			1 March 1950	TL8222914629; 51°48′02″N 0°38′29″E		1122587	Upload Photo	Q17557159
Spread Eagle Hotel	II*	Newland Street	hotel		1 March 1950	TL8213814494; 51°47′58″N 0°38′24″E		1122590	Spread Eagle Hotel More images	Q17557164
Wall to the Former House the Grove (that Part Fronting Onto Newland Street)	II	Newland Street			1 March 1950	TL8234114788; 51°48′07″N 0°38′35″E		1122586	Upload Photo	Q26415732
Whitehall Cinema	II	Newland Street			1 March 1950	TL8222814686; 51°48′04″N 0°38′29″E		1122578	Upload Photo	Q26415724
Witham United Reformed Church	II	Newland Street			11 March 1985	TL8200214421; 51°47′56″N 0°38′17″E		1122574	Upload Photo	Q26415721
Grove Cottages	II	1-5, Newland Street			7 February 1973	TL8247014938; 51°48′12″N 0°38′42″E		1338226	Upload Photo	Q26622570
Freebournes House	II*	3, Newland Street			1 March 1950	TL8227014687; 51°48′04″N 0°38′31″E		1306394	Upload Photo	Q17557733
Avenue House Newbury House	II*	4, Newland Street			1 March 1950	TL8226014769; 51°48′07″N 0°38′31″E		1122576	Upload Photo	Q17557152
6-12, Newland Street	II	6-12, Newland Street			1 March 1950	TL8227214748; 51°48′06″N 0°38′32″E		1122577	Upload Photo	Q26415723
Red Lion Inn	II	7, Newland Street	pub		7 February 1973	TL8220314608; 51°48′02″N 0°38′28″E		1306401	Red Lion Inn More images	Q26593186
9-13, Newland Street	II	9-13, Newland Street			7 February 1973	TL8219214591; 51°48′01″N 0°38′27″E		1122588	Upload Photo	Q26415733
Roslyn House	II*	16, Newland Street			1 March 1950	TL8224414721; 51°48′05″N 0°38′30″E		1338220	Upload Photo	Q17557924
22-26, Newland Street	II	22-26, Newland Street			1 March 1950	TL8221014665; 51°48′03″N 0°38′28″E		1338221	Upload Photo	Q26622565
29-33, Newland Street	II	29-33, Newland Street			7 February 1973	TL8218614578; 51°48′01″N 0°38′27″E		1306367	Upload Photo	Q26593154
George Inn	II	36, Newland Street	inn		7 February 1973	TL8216814622; 51°48′02″N 0°38′26″E		1122579	George Inn More images	Q26415725
47, Newland Street	II	47, Newland Street			1 March 1950	TL8213214510; 51°47′58″N 0°38′24″E		1306371	Upload Photo	Q26593158
53 and 55, Newland Street	II	53 and 55, Newland Street			1 March 1950	TL8212414480; 51°47′57″N 0°38′23″E		1306377	Upload Photo	Q26593163
56, 58a and 58, Newland Street	II	56, 58a and 58, Newland Street			7 February 1973	TL8211714530; 51°47′59″N 0°38′23″E		1122580	Upload Photo	Q26415726
Midland Bank	II*	57, Newland Street			1 March 1950	TL8211514464; 51°47′57″N 0°38′23″E		1122591	Upload Photo	Q17557166
60, Newland Street	II	60, Newland Street			7 February 1973	TL8210614515; 51°47′59″N 0°38′23″E		1338222	Upload Photo	Q26622566
61, Newland Street	II	61, Newland Street	building		4 August 1971	TL8209514443; 51°47′56″N 0°38′22″E		1122592	61, Newland Street More images	Q26415735
62, Newland Street	II	62, Newland Street			7 February 1973	TL8210614509; 51°47′58″N 0°38′23″E		1122581	Upload Photo	Q26415727
No. 63 Newland Street	II	63, Newland Street, CM8 1AA			1 March 1950	TL8208714435; 51°47′56″N 0°38′21″E		1169773	Upload Photo	Q26462947
64, Newland Street	II	64, Newland Street			7 February 1973	TL8210214502; 51°47′58″N 0°38′22″E		1338223	Upload Photo	Q26622567
No. 65 Newland Street	II	65, Newland Street, CM8 1AB			7 February 1973	TL8208014426; 51°47′56″N 0°38′21″E		1122593	Upload Photo	Q26415736
66, Newland Street	II	66, Newland Street			1 March 1950	TL8208414504; 51°47′58″N 0°38′21″E		1122582	Upload Photo	Q26415728
68, Newland Street	II	68, Newland Street			1 September 1975	TL8208014492; 51°47′58″N 0°38′21″E		1338255	Upload Photo	Q26622593
72, Newland Street	II	72, Newland Street			7 February 1973	TL8205814472; 51°47′57″N 0°38′20″E		1169700	Upload Photo	Q26462877
74 and 76, Newland Street	II	74 and 76, Newland Street			7 February 1973	TL8204414465; 51°47′57″N 0°38′19″E		1122583	Upload Photo	Q26415729
London House	II	78, Newland Street			1 March 1950	TL8205214450; 51°47′57″N 0°38′20″E		1169703	Upload Photo	Q26462880
83, Newland Street	II	83, Newland Street			7 February 1973	TL8206714414; 51°47′55″N 0°38′20″E		1169778	Upload Photo	Q26462953
85, Newland Street	II	85, Newland Street			1 March 1950	TL8206414410; 51°47′55″N 0°38′20″E		1122594	Upload Photo	Q26415737
86, Newland Street	II	86, Newland Street			7 February 1973	TL8203014420; 51°47′56″N 0°38′18″E		1338224	Upload Photo	Q26622568
87, Newland Street	II	87, Newland Street			1 March 1950	TL8206214404; 51°47′55″N 0°38′20″E		1169784	Upload Photo	Q26462960
89 and 91, Newland Street	II	89 and 91, Newland Street			7 February 1973	TL8205414401; 51°47′55″N 0°38′20″E		1338227	Upload Photo	Q26622571
90, Newland Street	II	90, Newland Street			7 February 1973	TL8201414399; 51°47′55″N 0°38′18″E		1306388	Upload Photo	Q26593174
92, Newland Street	II	92, Newland Street			1 March 1950	TL8201014392; 51°47′55″N 0°38′17″E		1122584	Upload Photo	Q26415730
100, Newland Street	II	100, Newland Street			1 March 1950	TL8198814360; 51°47′54″N 0°38′16″E		1169707	Upload Photo	Q26462883
117 and 119, Newland Street	II*	117 and 119, Newland Street			1 March 1950	TL8199214322; 51°47′53″N 0°38′16″E		1306348	Upload Photo	Q17557729
Highway Cottage	II	118, Newland Street			7 February 1973	TL8195314309; 51°47′52″N 0°38′14″E		1169709	Upload Photo	Q26462885
121 and 123, Newland Street	II	121 and 123, Newland Street			1 March 1950	TL8198214313; 51°47′52″N 0°38′16″E		1122595	Upload Photo	Q26415738
125 and 127, Newland Street	II	125 and 127, Newland Street			1 March 1950	TL8197414300; 51°47′52″N 0°38′15″E		1306351	Upload Photo	Q26593139
126, Newland Street	II	126, Newland Street			1 March 1950	TL8193814291; 51°47′52″N 0°38′13″E		1122585	Upload Photo	Q26415731
The Crotchet	II	128, Newland Street			7 February 1973	TL8192814285; 51°47′51″N 0°38′13″E		1169712	Upload Photo	Q26462888
129, Newland Street	II*	129, Newland Street			1 March 1950	TL8196114288; 51°47′51″N 0°38′15″E		1338228	Upload Photo	Q17557926
Jarmyns	II	130, Newland Street			16 January 1991	TL8191914272; 51°47′51″N 0°38′12″E		1338239	Upload Photo	Q26622580
149 and 151, Newland Street	II	149 and 151, Newland Street			7 February 1973	TL8192614228; 51°47′50″N 0°38′13″E		1306352	Upload Photo	Q26593140
Spring Lodge Farm Barn	II	Powers Hall End			1 March 1950	TL8148315406; 51°48′28″N 0°37′52″E		1122554	Upload Photo	Q26415702
Wall to the North of Powers Hall End	II	Powers Hall End			7 February 1973	TL8137715360; 51°48′27″N 0°37′46″E		1122555	Upload Photo	Q26415703
3, Powers Hall End	II	3, Powers Hall End			7 February 1973	TL8149415368; 51°48′27″N 0°37′52″E		1338249	Upload Photo	Q26622587
Stourton	II	26, Powers Hall End			7 February 1973	TL8132515332; 51°48′26″N 0°37′43″E		1338250	Upload Photo	Q26622588
Nos. 28 and 30, Powers Hall End	II	28 and 30, Powers Hall End			7 February 1973	TL8130915325; 51°48′26″N 0°37′43″E		1122556	Upload Photo	Q26415704
Spa Place	II	58, Powers Hall End			7 February 1973	TL8106915222; 51°48′23″N 0°37′30″E		1338251	Upload Photo	Q26622589
Barns to Powers Hall	II	Terling Road			1 March 1950	TL8014815145; 51°48′21″N 0°36′42″E		1306344	Upload Photo	Q26593133
Powers Hall	II	Terling Road			1 March 1950	TL8009815183; 51°48′23″N 0°36′39″E		1122560	Upload Photo	Q26415708
Warehouse Occupied by Thomas Cullen and Sons	II	White Horse Lane			7 February 1973	TL8197715367; 51°48′26″N 0°38′17″E		1169869	Upload Photo	Q26463043
Warehouse Occupied by Thomas Cullen and Sons	II	White Horse Lane			7 February 1973	TL8195515359; 51°48′26″N 0°38′16″E		1264904	Upload Photo	Q26682375
Benton Hall	II	Wickham Hill			1 March 1950	TL8285213289; 51°47′18″N 0°38′59″E		1122561	Upload Photo	Q26415709

== See also ==
- Grade I listed buildings in Essex
- Grade II* listed buildings in Essex

== Sources ==
- Bettley, James; Pevsner, Nikolaus (2007) [1954], Essex, The Buildings of England, New Haven and London: Yale University Press, ISBN 978-0-300-11614-4
