= Listed buildings in Braintree =

Listed buildings in Essex, England

Braintree is a town and non-civil parish in the Braintree District of Essex, England. It contains 211 listed buildings that are recorded in the National Heritage List for England. Of these two are grade I, 23 are grade II* and 186 are grade II.

This list is based on the information retrieved online from Historic England.

== Key ==
Grade	Criteria
I	Buildings that are of exceptional interest
II*	Particularly important buildings of more than special interest
II	Buildings that are of special interest

== Listing ==
Name	Grade	Location	Type	Completed (Note: The date given is the date used by Historic England as significant for the initial building or that of an important part in the structure's description.)	Date designated	Grid ref. (Note: The grid reference is based on the British national grid reference system, sometimes known as OSGB36, used by the Ordnance Survey.) Geo-coordinates	Notes	Entry number (Note: The "List Entry Number" is a unique number assigned to each listed building and scheduled monument by Historic England.)	Image	Wikidata
24 and 26 New Street	II	24 and 26 New Street, CM7 1ES			29 November 1973	TL7570622989; 51°52′40″N 0°33′04″E		1122474	Upload Photo	Q26415626
John Ray House	II				24 March 2010	TL7580223353; 51°52′52″N 0°33′10″E		1393723	Upload Photo	Q26672869
Barclay's Bank	II	1, Bank Street			29 November 1973	TL7566223208; 51°52′47″N 0°33′02″E		1122534	Upload Photo	Q26415686
3 and 9, Bank Street	II	3 and 9, Bank Street			29 November 1973	TL7566523193; 51°52′47″N 0°33′03″E		1122535	Upload Photo	Q26415687
11, Bank Street	II	11, Bank Street			29 November 1973	TL7566723182; 51°52′46″N 0°33′03″E		1338240	Upload Photo	Q26622581
Swan Inn	II*	26, Bank Street	pub		25 October 1951	TL7571623148; 51°52′45″N 0°33′05″E		1338242	Swan Inn More images	Q17557931
31, Bank Street	II	31, Bank Street, CM7 1UG			25 October 1951	TL7568323110; 51°52′44″N 0°33′03″E		1122536	Upload Photo	Q26415688
33, Bank Street	II	33, Bank Street, CM7 1UG			25 October 1951	TL7568423101; 51°52′44″N 0°33′03″E		1338241	Upload Photo	Q26622582
37 and 39, Bank Street	II	37 and 39, Bank Street, CM7 1UG			25 October 1951	TL7568223090; 51°52′43″N 0°33′03″E		1122537	Upload Photo	Q26415689
40, Bank Street	II	40, Bank Street			29 November 1973	TL7569823115; 51°52′44″N 0°33′04″E		1122538	Upload Photo	Q26415690
Telephone Kiosk	II	Bank Street			24 February 1988	TL7573223151; 51°52′45″N 0°33′06″E		1122449	Upload Photo	Q26415602
Bawn Cottage	II	Bawn Close, Bocking			29 November 1973	TL7601423863; 51°53′08″N 0°33′22″E		1122539	Upload Photo	Q26415691
Chapel of the Immaculate Conception, Bocking	II	Bocking, CM7 9RS	chapel		29 November 1973	TL7630624352; 51°53′23″N 0°33′38″E		1122521	Chapel of the Immaculate Conception, Bocking More images	Q26415673
The Deanery	II	Bocking, Bocking Church Street, The Deanery			25 October 1951	TL7563225424; 51°53′59″N 0°33′05″E		1122496	Upload Photo	Q26415647
Doreward's Hall	II*	Bocking Church Street	architectural structure		25 October 1951	TL7626025442; 51°53′59″N 0°33′38″E		1170740	Doreward's Hall More images	Q17557633
Serpentine Wall to Doreward's Hall	II	Bocking Church Street			29 November 1973	TL7623125418; 51°53′58″N 0°33′36″E		1122522	Upload Photo	Q26415674
2, Bocking End	II	2, Bocking End, Bocking			25 October 1951	TL7570623249; 51°52′48″N 0°33′05″E		1122540	Upload Photo	Q26415692
Congregational Church	II	Bocking End, Bocking			25 October 1951	TL7576423386; 51°52′53″N 0°33′08″E		1122541	Upload Photo	Q26415693
The Institute and Museum	II	Bocking End, Bocking			29 November 1973	TL7568223292; 51°52′50″N 0°33′04″E		1338244	Upload Photo	Q26622584
The White Hart Hotel	II	Bocking End, Bocking	hotel		25 October 1952	TL7570223235; 51°52′48″N 0°33′05″E		1338243	The White Hart Hotel More images	Q26622583
Barn About 50 Metres East of Bovingdon Hall	II	Bovingdon Road			21 May 1992	TL7463526914; 51°54′48″N 0°32′16″E		1235058	Upload Photo	Q26528418
3, Bradford Street	II	3, Bradford Street, Bocking, CM7 9AS			29 November 1973	TL7595423673; 51°53′02″N 0°33′19″E		1169791	Upload Photo	Q26462967
4, Bradford Street	II*	4, Bradford Street, Bocking			25 October 1951	TL7604323806; 51°53′06″N 0°33′23″E		1122553	Upload Photo	Q17557148
5, Bradford Street	II	5, Bradford Street, Bocking			29 November 1973	TL7596123679; 51°53′02″N 0°33′19″E		1122542	Upload Photo	Q26415694
6 and 8, Bradford Street	II	6 and 8, Bradford Street, Bocking			29 November 1973	TL7604423818; 51°53′06″N 0°33′23″E		1366144	Upload Photo	Q26647771
7 and 9, Bradford Street	II	7 and 9, Bradford Street, Bocking			29 November 1973	TL7596423687; 51°53′02″N 0°33′19″E		1338245	Upload Photo	Q26622585
10-14, Bradford Street	II	10-14, Bradford Street, Bocking			29 November 1973	TL7605023839; 51°53′07″N 0°33′24″E		1338267	Upload Photo	Q26622603
11, Bradford Street	II*	11, Bradford Street, Bocking			25 October 1951	TL7596823705; 51°53′03″N 0°33′19″E		1170171	Upload Photo	Q17557613
Bradford House	II*	13, Bradford Street			25 October 1951	TL7599023740; 51°53′04″N 0°33′21″E		1122543	Upload Photo	Q17557135
16-20, Bradford Street	II	16-20, Bradford Street, Bocking			29 November 1973	TL7605323847; 51°53′07″N 0°33′24″E		1122511	Upload Photo	Q26415662
Number 19 (including Outbuilding at the Rear)	II	21 and 23, Bradford Street, Bocking			25 October 1951	TL7600223771; 51°53′05″N 0°33′21″E		1122544	Upload Photo	Q26415695
24, Bradford Street	II	24, Bradford Street, Bocking			25 October 1951	TL7606223888; 51°53′09″N 0°33′25″E		1338268	Upload Photo	Q26622604
Georgian House	II*	25, Bradford Street, Bocking			25 October 1951	TL7600323791; 51°53′06″N 0°33′21″E		1170198	Upload Photo	Q17557618
Beechcroft	II	27, Bradford Street, Bocking			29 November 1973	TL7600423803; 51°53′06″N 0°33′21″E		1122545	Upload Photo	Q26415696
Clinton House	II	29, Bradford Street, CM7 9AS, Bocking			29 November 1973	TL7600523812; 51°53′06″N 0°33′21″E		1170228	Upload Photo	Q26463556
Old Court Hotel	II	31, Bradford Street, Bocking			25 October 1951	TL7601023832; 51°53′07″N 0°33′22″E		1122546	Upload Photo	Q26415697
The Bawn	II	37, Bradford Street, Bocking			25 October 1951	TL7603023873; 51°53′08″N 0°33′23″E		1170235	Upload Photo	Q26463563
38, Bradford Street	II	38, Bradford Street, Bocking			29 November 1973	TL7606323922; 51°53′10″N 0°33′25″E		1338269	Upload Photo	Q26622605
Gresham House	II	39, Bradford Street, Bocking			25 October 1951	TL7603423880; 51°53′08″N 0°33′23″E		1122547	Upload Photo	Q26415698
40 and 42, Bradford Street	II	40 and 42, Bradford Street, Bocking			25 October 1951	TL7607723932; 51°53′10″N 0°33′25″E		1122513	Upload Photo	Q26415664
Dragon House	II	41, Bradford Street, Bocking			25 October 1951	TL7603923902; 51°53′09″N 0°33′23″E		1122548	Upload Photo	Q26415699
Stanford House	II	44, Bradford Street, Bocking			25 October 1951	TL7606823947; 51°53′11″N 0°33′25″E		1122514	Upload Photo	Q26415665
46, Bradford Street	II	46, Bradford Street, Bocking			29 November 1973	TL7606623967; 51°53′11″N 0°33′25″E		1338270	Upload Photo	Q26622606
48, Bradford Street	II	48, Bradford Street, Bocking			29 November 1973	TL7605723974; 51°53′11″N 0°33′24″E		1122515	Upload Photo	Q26415666
50, Bradford Street	II	50, Bradford Street, Bocking			29 November 1973	TL7605623980; 51°53′12″N 0°33′24″E		1338271	Upload Photo	Q26622607
King's Head Inn	II	52, Bradford Street, Bocking			29 November 1973	TL7606223988; 51°53′12″N 0°33′25″E		1122516	Upload Photo	Q26415667
54 and 56, 56a, Bradford Street	II	54 and 56, 56a, Bradford Street, Bocking			25 October 1951	TL7605523998; 51°53′12″N 0°33′24″E		1122517	Upload Photo	Q26415668
63-73, Bradford Street	II	63-73, Bradford Street, Bocking			25 October 1951	TL7602123998; 51°53′12″N 0°33′23″E		1170273	Upload Photo	Q26463600
68, 68b, Bradford Street	II	68, 68b, Bradford Street, Bocking			25 October 1951	TL7604724050; 51°53′14″N 0°33′24″E		1338272	Upload Photo	Q26622608
75, Bradford Street	II*	75, Bradford Street, Bocking			22 March 1957	TL7602324016; 51°53′13″N 0°33′23″E		1122549	Upload Photo	Q17557139
77-81, Bradford Street	II*	77-81, Bradford Street, Bocking			25 October 1951	TL7601824023; 51°53′13″N 0°33′23″E		1338246	Upload Photo	Q17557935
83, Bradford Street	II	83, Bradford Street, Bocking			25 October 1951	TL7601724045; 51°53′14″N 0°33′23″E		1170297	Upload Photo	Q26463642
84-90, Bradford Street	II	84-90, Bradford Street, Bocking			25 October 1951	TL7605024098; 51°53′15″N 0°33′24″E		1122518	Upload Photo	Q26415669
85 and 85a, Bradford Street	II	85 and 85a, Bradford Street, CM7 9AU, Bocking			29 November 1973	TL7601624054; 51°53′14″N 0°33′22″E		1122550	Upload Photo	Q26415700
Wentworth House	II*	87, Bradford Street, Bocking			25 October 1951	TL7601624078; 51°53′15″N 0°33′23″E		1170324	Upload Photo	Q17557621
Maysent House	II*	89, Bradford Street, Bocking			25 October 1951	TL7601924093; 51°53′15″N 0°33′23″E		1122551	Upload Photo	Q17557146
92, 92a, 92b, 92c, Bradford Street	II	92, 92a, 92b, 92c, Bradford Street, Bocking			25 October 1951	TL7605224109; 51°53′16″N 0°33′24″E		1306044	Upload Photo	Q26592857
94, Bradford Street	II	94, Bradford Street			28 September 2005	TL7605424120; 51°53′16″N 0°33′25″E		1391390	Upload Photo	Q26670754
98 and 100, Bradford Street	II	98 and 100, Bradford Street, Bocking			29 November 1973	TL7606224124; 51°53′16″N 0°33′25″E		1338273	Upload Photo	Q26622609
102 and 104, Bradford Street	II	102 and 104, Bradford Street, Bocking			29 November 1973	TL7606224134; 51°53′17″N 0°33′25″E		1306012	Upload Photo	Q26592827
106, Bradford Street	II	106, Bradford Street, Bocking			29 November 1973	TL7607724151; 51°53′17″N 0°33′26″E		1122519	Upload Photo	Q26415670
108, Bradford Street	II	108, Bradford Street, Bocking			25 October 1951	TL7609124164; 51°53′18″N 0°33′27″E		1338274	Upload Photo	Q26622610
114-118, Bradford Street	II*	114-118, Bradford Street, Bocking			25 October 1951	TL7610924192; 51°53′18″N 0°33′28″E		1305938	Upload Photo	Q17557718
Dial House Inn	II*	173, Bradford Street, Bocking			25 October 1951	TL7619424284; 51°53′21″N 0°33′32″E		1338247	Upload Photo	Q17557938
Angel Inn	II	Bradford Street, Bocking	pub		29 November 1973	TL7606223904; 51°53′09″N 0°33′25″E		1122512	Angel Inn More images	Q26415663
Bradford Mill	II*	Bradford Street, Bocking	mill		25 October 1951	TL7624824328; 51°53′23″N 0°33′35″E		1170364	Bradford Mill More images	Q17557625
Bradford Mill House	II	Bradford Street, Bocking			29 November 1973	TL7624124312; 51°53′22″N 0°33′35″E		1122552	Upload Photo	Q26415701
K6 Telephone Kiosk	II	Bradford Street, Bocking			11 January 1988	TL7603824134; 51°53′17″N 0°33′24″E		1338278	Upload Photo	Q26622614
Little Bradfords	II	Bradford Street, Bocking			25 October 1951	TL7602423697; 51°53′03″N 0°33′22″E		1338248	Upload Photo	Q26622586
Outbuildings to Bradford Mill	II	Bradford Street, Bocking			29 November 1973	TL7622124302; 51°53′22″N 0°33′34″E		1170350	Upload Photo	Q26463755
Turners Cottage	II	1-4, Braintree Green			29 November 1973	TL7330722377; 51°52′23″N 0°30′58″E		1122476	Upload Photo	Q26415628
Blakelands	II	Braintree Green, CM77 6TE			29 November 1973	TL7345221964; 51°52′09″N 0°31′05″E		1172003	Upload Photo	Q26466683
Former Barn 40 Metres South South East of Blakelands	II	Braintree Green, CM77 6TE			27 August 1980	TL7346521954; 51°52′09″N 0°31′05″E		1122445	Upload Photo	Q26415598
Franciscan Convent	II	Broad Road, Bocking			29 November 1973	TL7629824332; 51°53′23″N 0°33′38″E		1122520	Upload Photo	Q26415671
1 and 3, Church Lane	II	1 and 3, Church Lane, Bocking			29 November 1973	TL7608924220; 51°53′19″N 0°33′27″E		1305924	Upload Photo	Q26592748
5, Church Lane	II	5, Church Lane, Bocking			29 November 1973	TL7608324229; 51°53′20″N 0°33′26″E		1122523	Upload Photo	Q26415675
9, Church Lane	II	9, Church Lane, Bocking			29 November 1973	TL7606624256; 51°53′21″N 0°33′25″E		1305901	Upload Photo	Q26592727
The Cottage	II	31, Church Lane, Bocking			29 November 1973	TL7597124402; 51°53′25″N 0°33′21″E		1122525	Upload Photo	Q26415677
35-39, Church Lane	II*	35-39, Church Lane, Bocking			25 October 1951	TL7596424424; 51°53′26″N 0°33′20″E		1170825	Upload Photo	Q17557644
47, Church Lane	II	47, Church Lane, Bocking			18 March 2005	TL7594924489; 51°53′28″N 0°33′20″E		1391261	Upload Photo	Q26670630
48 Church Lane	II	48, Church Lane, CM7 5SD, Bocking			29 November 1973	TL7595224550; 51°53′30″N 0°33′20″E		1122528	Upload Photo	Q26415681
The White Cottage	II	120, Church Lane, Bocking			29 November 1973	TL7580724957; 51°53′44″N 0°33′13″E		1170865	Upload Photo	Q26464547
Resting Seat House	II	125, Church Lane, Bocking			25 October 1951	TL7579424844; 51°53′40″N 0°33′12″E		1122527	Upload Photo	Q26415679
190-210, Church Lane	II	190-210, Church Lane, Bocking			29 November 1973	TL7576925412; 51°53′58″N 0°33′12″E		1122529	Upload Photo	Q26415682
212, Church Lane	II	212, Church Lane, Bocking			29 November 1973	TL7576825423; 51°53′59″N 0°33′12″E		1170898	Upload Photo	Q26464580
Bishop Cauden's Hall	II	Church Lane, Bocking			29 November 1973	TL7607524237; 51°53′20″N 0°33′26″E		1122524	Upload Photo	Q26415676
Boleyns	II*	Church Lane, Bocking			25 October 1951	TL7601324398; 51°53′25″N 0°33′23″E		1170835	Upload Photo	Q17557649
Hill Malthouse	II	Church Lane, Bocking			25 October 1951	TL7580024829; 51°53′39″N 0°33′13″E		1122526	Upload Photo	Q26415678
Stable Block and Outbuildings at Boleyns	II	Church Lane, Bocking			29 November 1973	TL7602024419; 51°53′26″N 0°33′23″E		1338275	Upload Photo	Q26622611
7-17, Church Street	II	7-17, Church Street, Bocking Church Street			29 November 1973	TL7576625582; 51°54′04″N 0°33′12″E		1338276	Upload Photo	Q26622612
43 and 45, Church Street	II	43 and 45, Church Street, Bocking Church Street			25 October 1951	TL7585125754; 51°54′09″N 0°33′17″E		1122532	Upload Photo	Q26415684
47-51, Church Street	II	47-51, Church Street, Bocking Church Street			25 October 1951	TL7585725760; 51°54′09″N 0°33′17″E		1170966	Upload Photo	Q26464678
53-57, Church Street	II	53-57, Church Street, Bocking Church Street			25 October 1951	TL7586325772; 51°54′10″N 0°33′18″E		1338238	Upload Photo	Q26622579
King William Inn	II	80 and 82, Church Street, Bocking Church Street	pub		25 October 1951	TL7586225733; 51°54′09″N 0°33′18″E		1122489	King William Inn More images	Q26415641
84 and 86, Church Street	II	84 and 86, Church Street, Bocking Church Street			29 November 1973	TL7587025744; 51°54′09″N 0°33′18″E		1338258	Upload Photo	Q26622596
Plough Cottage	II	93, Church Street, Bocking Church Street			29 November 1973	TL7590225839; 51°54′12″N 0°33′20″E		1338257	Upload Photo	Q26622595
Rose and Crown Public House	II	94, Church Street, Bocking Church Street			29 November 1973	TL7588425754; 51°54′09″N 0°33′19″E		1122490	Upload Photo	Q26415642
112 & 122-126, Church Street	II	112 & 122-126, Church Street, Bocking Church Street			29 November 1973	TL7591225795; 51°54′11″N 0°33′20″E		1338259	Upload Photo	Q26622597
121-139, Church Street	II	121-139, Church Street, Bocking			18 August 1986	TL7613126033; 51°54′18″N 0°33′32″E		1234723	Upload Photo	Q26528109
Hill House	II	178, Church Street, Bocking Church Street			29 November 1973	TL7601925900; 51°54′14″N 0°33′26″E		1122491	Upload Photo	Q26415643
Harriets Farmhouse	II	257, Church Street, Bocking Church Street			29 November 1973	TL7679626129; 51°54′20″N 0°34′07″E		1122488	Upload Photo	Q26415640
Bocking Hall	II*	Church Street, Bocking Church Street			25 October 1951	TL7569525754; 51°54′09″N 0°33′09″E		1338237	Upload Photo	Q17557929
Church of St Mary the Virgin	I	Church Street, Bocking Church Street	church building		25 October 1951	TL7568925684; 51°54′07″N 0°33′08″E		1122530	Church of St Mary the Virgin More images	Q17535793
Cottages at the Rear of King William Inn	II	Church Street, Bocking Church Street			10 February 1976	TL7588025723; 51°54′08″N 0°33′18″E		1276023	Upload Photo	Q26565567
Outbuilding 30 Metres East of Bocking Hall	II	Church Street, Bocking Church Street			25 October 1951	TL7573825746; 51°54′09″N 0°33′11″E		1122531	Upload Photo	Q26415683
Wall to Bocking Hall	II	Church Street, Bocking Church Street			29 November 1973	TL7571725752; 51°54′09″N 0°33′10″E		1305822	Upload Photo	Q26592652
Wall to the Church of St Mary the Virgin	II*	Church Street, Bocking Church Street			29 November 1973	TL7568125660; 51°54′06″N 0°33′08″E		1305850	Upload Photo	Q17557713
Windmill	I	Church Street, Bocking Church Street	post mill		25 October 1951	TL7630725967; 51°54′16″N 0°33′41″E		1122492	Windmill More images	Q4936285
21 and 22, Clockhouse Way	II	21 and 22, Clockhouse Way			8 September 1983	TL7712922934; 51°52′37″N 0°34′19″E		1234676	Upload Photo	Q26528064
21, Coggeshall Road	II	21, Coggeshall Road			29 November 1973	TL7604023286; 51°52′49″N 0°33′22″E		1338261	Upload Photo	Q26622599
82, Coggeshall Road	II	82, Coggeshall Road			29 November 1973	TL7592023243; 51°52′48″N 0°33′16″E		1122494	Upload Photo	Q26415645
84, Coggeshall Road	II	84, Coggeshall Road			29 November 1973	TL7592723246; 51°52′48″N 0°33′16″E		1305791	Upload Photo	Q26592624
86, Coggeshall Road	II	86, Coggeshall Road			29 November 1973	TL7593223247; 51°52′48″N 0°33′17″E		1338262	Upload Photo	Q26622600
98 and 100, Coggeshall Road	II	98 and 100, Coggeshall Road			29 November 1973	TL7597223246; 51°52′48″N 0°33′19″E		1171095	Upload Photo	Q26464879
Barn 18 Metres South West of Mark's Farmhouse	II	Coggeshall Road			23 May 1988	TL7752023475; 51°52′54″N 0°34′40″E		1234796	Upload Photo	Q26528176
Essex County Library	II	Coggeshall Road			29 November 1973	TL7589323267; 51°52′49″N 0°33′15″E		1122493	Upload Photo	Q26415644
Mark's Farmhouse	II	Coggeshall Road, Bocking			29 November 1973	TL7755023496; 51°52′54″N 0°34′42″E		1338260	Upload Photo	Q26622598
The Corner House	II	Corner House, Market Place, CM7 3HQ			1 March 2013	TL7582922996; 51°52′40″N 0°33′11″E		1409745	Upload Photo	Q26676111
Tudor Cottage	II	37-41, Cressing Road			29 November 1973	TL7676623284; 51°52′48″N 0°34′00″E		1122495	Upload Photo	Q26415646
156 and 158, Cressing Road	II	156 and 158, Cressing Road			8 September 1983	TL7701823011; 51°52′39″N 0°34′13″E		1338315	Upload Photo	Q26622650
Dovecote to the Deanery	II	Deanery Hill, Bocking, Bocking Church Street			25 October 1951	TL7561925376; 51°53′57″N 0°33′04″E		1171101	Upload Photo	Q17664758
Baytrees Restaurant and Osborn's Shop	II	Drury Lane			10 April 1992	TL7573323135; 51°52′45″N 0°33′06″E		1140085	Upload Photo	Q26432882
Number 7 Cob Cottage and Number 8	II	8, Faggot Yard, Off Church Lane			10 June 1987	TL7591624447; 51°53′27″N 0°33′18″E		1140086	Upload Photo	Q26432883
Fennes Farmhouse Including Attached Garden Wall to North West	II	Fennes Road, Bocking			1 April 1992	TL7620627294; 51°54′59″N 0°33′38″E		1275812	Upload Photo	Q26565370
Garden House About 40 Metres West North West of Fennes Farmhouse	II	Fennes Road, Bocking			1 April 1992	TL7615927310; 51°54′59″N 0°33′36″E		1140084	Upload Photo	Q26432881
Lodge About 100 Metres South West of Fennes Farmhouse	II	Fennes Road, Bocking			1 April 1992	TL7613527238; 51°54′57″N 0°33′35″E		1275885	Upload Photo	Q26565440
Shell House About 50 Metres West South West of Fennes Farmhouse	II	Fennes Road, Bocking			1 April 1992	TL7614627278; 51°54′58″N 0°33′35″E		1140083	Upload Photo	Q26432879
Bell Inn	II	Great Square			21 August 1972	TL7572323067; 51°52′43″N 0°33′05″E		1338264	Upload Photo	Q26622601
House and Shop Occupied by Adams and Sons Newsagent	II	Great Square			21 August 1972	TL7573823067; 51°52′43″N 0°33′06″E		1171161	Upload Photo	Q26464992
House and Shop Occupied by Cameron Chemist	II	Great Square			29 November 1973	TL7575823073; 51°52′43″N 0°33′07″E		1122497	Upload Photo	Q26415648
The Constitutional Club and Shops	II*	Great Square			25 October 1951	TL7577523096; 51°52′43″N 0°33′08″E		1338263	Upload Photo	Q17557940
Large Barn at High Garret House	II	High Garret, Bocking			6 November 1984	TL7745726941; 51°54′46″N 0°34′43″E		1234711	Upload Photo	Q26528098
Small Barn at High Garret House	II	High Garret, Bocking			6 November 1984	TL7745926961; 51°54′46″N 0°34′43″E		1122447	Upload Photo	Q26415600
Mill Lodge	II	105, High Garrett, Bocking			29 November 1973	TL7745926820; 51°54′42″N 0°34′43″E		1305731	Upload Photo	Q26592570
High Garrett House	II	107, High Garrett, Bocking			29 November 1973	TL7749326906; 51°54′45″N 0°34′45″E		1122498	Upload Photo	Q26415649
116, High Garrett	II	116, High Garrett, Bocking			29 November 1973	TL7758227028; 51°54′48″N 0°34′50″E		1122499	Upload Photo	Q26415650
The Horn Hotel	II	68 and 70, High Street			25 October 1951	TL7567623052; 51°52′42″N 0°33′03″E		1122504	Upload Photo	Q26415655
72a and 72, High Street	II	72a and 72, High Street			25 October 1951	TL7566423048; 51°52′42″N 0°33′02″E		1305673	Upload Photo	Q26592520
73 and 75 High Street	II	73 and 75, High Street			29 November 1973	TL7559023018; 51°52′41″N 0°32′58″E		1171209	Upload Photo	Q26465049
Numbers 74, 74a and Corn Exchange	II	74, 74a, High Street			29 November 1973	TL7565323041; 51°52′42″N 0°33′02″E		1122505	Upload Photo	Q26415656
76 and 78, High Street	II	76 and 78, High Street			25 October 1951	TL7564423033; 51°52′42″N 0°33′01″E		1171330	Upload Photo	Q26465246
Number 77 and Covered Passageway to South West and North East Cart Entrance	II	77, High Street			25 October 1951	TL7557223010; 51°52′41″N 0°32′57″E		1122500	Upload Photo	Q26415651
80, High Street	II	80, High Street			29 November 1973	TL7563423030; 51°52′41″N 0°33′01″E		1122506	Upload Photo	Q26415657
The Boar's Head Hotel	II	85-93, High Street	hotel		29 November 1973	TL7554622996; 51°52′40″N 0°32′56″E		1171229	The Boar's Head Hotel More images	Q26465072
90, High Street	II	90, High Street			29 November 1973	TL7561023014; 51°52′41″N 0°32′59″E		1122507	Upload Photo	Q26415658
92-96, High Street	II	92-96, High Street			29 November 1973	TL7559923009; 51°52′41″N 0°32′59″E		1171730	Upload Photo	Q26466087
100 and 102, High Street	II	100 and 102, High Street			25 October 1951	TL7559023002; 51°52′41″N 0°32′58″E		1338265	Upload Photo	Q26622602
The Wheatsheaf Hotel	II	101 and 103, High Street			29 November 1973	TL7551622943; 51°52′39″N 0°32′54″E		1122501	Upload Photo	Q26415652
105 and 107, High Street	II	105 and 107, High Street			29 November 1973	TL7551022926; 51°52′38″N 0°32′54″E		1122502	Upload Photo	Q26415653
106 High Street	II	106, High Street			25 October 1951	TL7558422997; 51°52′40″N 0°32′58″E		1122508	Upload Photo	Q26415659
112, High Street	II	112, High Street			29 November 1973	TL7558122987; 51°52′40″N 0°32′58″E		1305441	Upload Photo	Q26592305
113 and 115, High Street	II	113 and 115, High Street			25 October 1951	TL7550222908; 51°52′38″N 0°32′54″E		1305659	Upload Photo	Q26592507
College House	II	117, High Street			29 November 1973	TL7549122898; 51°52′37″N 0°32′53″E		1122503	Upload Photo	Q26415654
Fountain, High Street	II	High Street	fountain		18 March 2005	TL7555122941; 51°52′39″N 0°32′56″E		1391259	Fountain, High Street More images	Q26670627
Thorpe Lodge	II	33, Julien Court Road			27 October 1998	TL7634923662; 51°53′01″N 0°33′39″E		1386056	Upload Photo	Q26665812
The Old Manor House	II*	Little Square			25 October 1951	TL7571723126; 51°52′44″N 0°33′05″E		1338266	Upload Photo	Q17557944
Blandford House	II	7, London Road			25 October 1951	TL7549522839; 51°52′35″N 0°32′53″E		1305456	Upload Photo	Q26592316
19 and 21, London Road	II	19 and 21, London Road			29 November 1973	TL7544522786; 51°52′34″N 0°32′50″E		1122509	Upload Photo	Q26415660
23-33, London Road	II	23-33, London Road			29 November 1973	TL7542722758; 51°52′33″N 0°32′49″E		1122510	Upload Photo	Q26415661
35 and 37, London Road	II	35 and 37, London Road			29 November 1973	TL7541922753; 51°52′33″N 0°32′49″E		1122466	Upload Photo	Q26415619
41, London Road	II	41, London Road			29 November 1973	TL7540622732; 51°52′32″N 0°32′48″E		1122467	Upload Photo	Q26415620
77-81, London Road	II	77-81, London Road			29 November 1973	TL7531922572; 51°52′27″N 0°32′43″E		1338287	Upload Photo	Q26622623
Bridge Farmhouse	II	78, London Road			25 October 1951	TL7510222118; 51°52′13″N 0°32′31″E		1122468	Upload Photo	Q26415621
King William IV Public House	II	114, London Road	pub		29 November 1973	TL7494921706; 51°51′59″N 0°32′22″E		1338288	King William IV Public House More images	Q26622624
Little Marshalls Marshalls Marshalls Two	II	London Road			5 December 1986	TL7527622273; 51°52′17″N 0°32′41″E		1122448	Upload Photo	Q26415601
Lyons Hall	II*	Lyons Hall Road, Bocking, Lyons Hall			25 October 1951	TL7756625428; 51°53′57″N 0°34′46″E		1122469	Upload Photo	Q17557129
The Bull Hotel	II	1 and 2, Market Place	hotel		29 November 1973	TL7577723049; 51°52′42″N 0°33′08″E		1122470	The Bull Hotel More images	Q26415622
Number 23 and Hill House	II	23, Market Place			29 November 1973	TL7578223078; 51°52′43″N 0°33′08″E		1122471	Upload Photo	Q26415623
Town Hall Including Screens and Public Lavatories Adjoining North East and South	II*	Market Square	city hall		27 April 1992	TL7585423018; 51°52′41″N 0°33′12″E		1235026	Town Hall Including Screens and Public Lavatories Adjoining North East and South More images	Q17557696
3, New Street	II	3, New Street			21 August 1972	TL7572323053; 51°52′42″N 0°33′05″E		1338289	Upload Photo	Q26622625
4, New Street	II	4, New Street			25 October 1951	TL7570223027; 51°52′41″N 0°33′04″E		1171889	Upload Photo	Q26466529
22 New Street	II	22, New Street, CM7 1ES			29 November 1973	TL7570622994; 51°52′40″N 0°33′04″E		1122473	Upload Photo	Q26415625
34, New Street	II	34, New Street			29 November 1973	TL7571222951; 51°52′39″N 0°33′05″E		1171905	Upload Photo	Q26466553
Bradbury House	II	New Street, CM7 1ES			25 October 1951	TL7573822892; 51°52′37″N 0°33′06″E		1122472	Upload Photo	Q26415624
House Occupied by Henry Joscelyn Limited	II	New Street			25 October 1951	TL7570023043; 51°52′42″N 0°33′04″E		1338290	Upload Photo	Q26622626
The Cage Or Lock Up	II	New Street			21 April 1977	TL7570722959; 51°52′39″N 0°33′04″E		1338314	Upload Photo	Q26622649
The Liberal Club	II	New Street			4 April 1974	TL7573023043; 51°52′42″N 0°33′06″E		1235013	Upload Photo	Q26528377
Notley Place	II	122, Notley Road			29 November 1973	TL7580722265; 51°52′17″N 0°33′08″E		1122475	Upload Photo	Q26415627
169, Notley Road	II	169, Notley Road			3 November 1983	TL7591521998; 51°52′08″N 0°33′13″E		1122446	Upload Photo	Q26415599
Angel Inn	II	Notley Road			29 November 1973	TL7570222723; 51°52′31″N 0°33′04″E		1338291	Upload Photo	Q26685060
Black Notley Lodge	II*	Notley Road			22 March 1957	TL7592921586; 51°51′54″N 0°33′13″E		1171947	Upload Photo	Q17557673
3, Panfield Lane	II	3, Panfield Lane, Bocking			29 November 1973	TL7559823286; 51°52′50″N 0°32′59″E		1338292	Upload Photo	Q26622628
5 and 7, Panfield Lane	II	5 and 7, Panfield Lane, Bocking			29 November 1973	TL7559223294; 51°52′50″N 0°32′59″E		1305319	Upload Photo	Q26592203
Clapbridge Farm House	II	Princes Road			10 July 1990	TL7458822645; 51°52′30″N 0°32′05″E		1122716	Upload Photo	Q26415833
Naylinghurst	II	885, Queenborough Lane, Naylinghurst			29 November 1973	TL7361222211; 51°52′17″N 0°31′14″E		1122477	Upload Photo	Q26415629
Barn Adjoining Stanford Farmhouse	II	Queenborough Lane			29 November 1973	TL7346621931; 51°52′08″N 0°31′05″E		1122478	Upload Photo	Q26415630
Beddalls	II	Queenborough Lane			29 November 1973	TL7478621438; 51°51′51″N 0°32′13″E		1172012	Upload Photo	Q26466695
6 8, Rayne Road	II	6 8, Rayne Road, Bocking			29 November 1973	TL7565223233; 51°52′48″N 0°33′02″E		1122479	Upload Photo	Q26415631
Horse and Groom Inn	II	20, Rayne Road, Bocking			29 November 1973	TL7558723209; 51°52′47″N 0°32′59″E		1122480	Upload Photo	Q26415632
28-34, Rayne Road	II	28-34, Rayne Road, Bocking			29 November 1973	TL7551923169; 51°52′46″N 0°32′55″E		1305336	Upload Photo	Q26592219
Hill House	II	36, Rayne Road, Bocking			29 November 1973	TL7550523189; 51°52′47″N 0°32′54″E		1122481	Upload Photo	Q26415633
48-52, Rayne Road	II	48-52, Rayne Road, Bocking			29 November 1973	TL7547423143; 51°52′45″N 0°32′52″E		1305300	Upload Photo	Q26592185
54-74, Rayne Road	II	54-74, Rayne Road, Bocking			29 November 1973	TL7545023140; 51°52′45″N 0°32′51″E		1122482	Upload Photo	Q26415634
Rayne Lodge	II	Rayne Road, Rayne Lodge			29 November 1973	TL7428723191; 51°52′48″N 0°31′51″E		1305302	Upload Photo	Q26592187
St Michael's Hospital	II	Rayne Road, Bocking	hospital		29 November 1973	TL7511523136; 51°52′45″N 0°32′34″E		1122483	St Michael's Hospital More images	Q26415635
Gooseberry Hall	II	57, South Street			29 November 1973	TL7584822873; 51°52′36″N 0°33′12″E		1122484	Upload Photo	Q26415636
66, South Street	II	66, South Street			29 November 1973	TL7583822828; 51°52′35″N 0°33′11″E		1305314	Upload Photo	Q26592198
68 and 70, South Street	II	68 and 70, South Street			29 November 1973	TL7584722818; 51°52′34″N 0°33′11″E		1338294	Upload Photo	Q26622630
New Mills	II	South Street			29 November 1973	TL7579322806; 51°52′34″N 0°33′09″E		1122485	Upload Photo	Q26415637
Pound End Mill (formerly Part of New Mills)	II	South Street			29 November 1973	TL7578522867; 51°52′36″N 0°33′08″E		1119619	Upload Photo	Q26412930
Church of St Michael	II*	St Michaels Road	church building		25 October 1951	TL7560722937; 51°52′38″N 0°32′59″E		1338293	Church of St Michael More images	Q17557946
Church of St Peter	II	St Peters In The Fields, Bocking	church building		28 April 2006	TL7574323550; 51°52′58″N 0°33′07″E		1391584	Church of St Peter More images	Q26670939
Braintree Railway Station and Former Station Master's House	II	Station Approach			25 July 1989	TL7609622736; 51°52′31″N 0°33′24″E		1338279	Upload Photo	Q26622615
2 and 4, Sunnyfields Road	II	2 and 4, Sunnyfields Road, Bocking			29 November 1973	TL7755926833; 51°54′42″N 0°34′48″E		1122486	Upload Photo	Q26415638
12 and 14, Sunnyfields Road	II	12 and 14, Sunnyfields Road, Bocking			29 November 1973	TL7762126804; 51°54′41″N 0°34′51″E		1172074	Upload Photo	Q26466773
Barn at Dorewards Hall	II	The Chase			5 March 1985	TL7625225333; 51°53′55″N 0°33′37″E		1338277	Upload Photo	Q26622613
Willoughby's Farmhouse	II	Willoughby's Lane, Bocking			25 October 1971	TL7770926003; 51°54′15″N 0°34′55″E		1338295	Upload Photo	Q26622631
1, Woolpack Lane	II	1, Woolpack Lane, Bocking			22 March 1957	TL7600224010; 51°53′13″N 0°33′22″E		1305292	Upload Photo	Q26592179
2, Woolpack Lane	II	2, Woolpack Lane, Bocking			29 November 1973	TL7601224023; 51°53′13″N 0°33′22″E		1122487	Upload Photo	Q26415639

== See also ==
- Grade I listed buildings in Essex
- Grade II* listed buildings in Essex

== Sources ==
- Bettley, James; Pevsner, Nikolaus (2007) [1954], Essex, The Buildings of England, New Haven and London: Yale University Press, ISBN 978-0-300-11614-4
