= Listed buildings in Cressing =

Historic structures in Essex, England

Cressing is a village and civil parish in the Braintree District of Essex, England. It contains 47 listed buildings that are recorded in the National Heritage List for England. Of these three are grade I and 44 are grade II.

This list is based on the information retrieved online from Historic England.

== Key ==
Grade	Criteria
I	Buildings that are of exceptional interest
II*	Particularly important buildings of more than special interest
II	Buildings that are of special interest

== Listing ==
Name	Grade	Location	Type	Completed (Note: The date given is the date used by Historic England as significant for the initial building or that of an important part in the structure's description.)	Date designated	Grid ref. (Note: The grid reference is based on the British national grid reference system, sometimes known as OSGB36, used by the Ordnance Survey.) Geo-coordinates	Notes	Entry number (Note: The "List Entry Number" is a unique number assigned to each listed building and scheduled monument by Historic England.)	Image	Wikidata
Byre 15 Metres South East of Withies Green Farmhouse	II				16 April 1984	TL7947822767; 51°52′29″N 0°36′21″E		1337615	Upload Photo	Q26622015
Barn 25 Metres South West of Withies Green Farmhouse	II				16 April 1984	TL7945822737; 51°52′28″N 0°36′20″E		1337616	Upload Photo	Q26622016
Barn 30 Metres South East of Withies Green Farmhouse	II				16 April 1984	TL7950222736; 51°52′27″N 0°36′22″E		1123853	Upload Photo	Q26416942
Cartlodge/granary 35 Metres South of Withies Green Farmhouse	II				16 April 1984	TL7948322725; 51°52′27″N 0°36′21″E		1123854	Upload Photo	Q26416943
Fell's Farmhouse	II				29 July 1988	TL7946922034; 51°52′05″N 0°36′19″E		1337614	Upload Photo	Q26622014
Withies Green Farmhouse	II				16 April 1984	TL7946322732; 51°52′27″N 0°36′20″E		1123852	Upload Photo	Q26416941
Ashes Farmhouse	II	Ashes Road			29 July 1988	TL7897621208; 51°51′39″N 0°35′52″E		1306959	Upload Photo	Q26593679
Barn 10 Metres South East of Ashes Farmhouse	II	Ashes Road			29 July 1988	TL7899121189; 51°51′38″N 0°35′53″E		1123855	Upload Photo	Q26416944
Barn 40 Metres South East of Ashes Farmhouse	II	Ashes Road			29 July 1988	TL7901921175; 51°51′38″N 0°35′54″E		1248172	Upload Photo	Q26540408
Cressing Park	II	Braintree Road			29 May 1987	TL7815720990; 51°51′33″N 0°35′09″E		1123856	Upload Photo	Q26416945
Fowler's Farmhouse	II	Braintree Road			29 July 1988	TL7792821905; 51°52′02″N 0°34′58″E		1168605	Upload Photo	Q26461849
Frogs Cottage	II	Braintree Road			29 July 1988	TL7805721075; 51°51′35″N 0°35′04″E		1337617	Upload Photo	Q26622017
Tudor House	II	Braintree Road			29 July 1988	TL7809221042; 51°51′34″N 0°35′05″E		1306939	Upload Photo	Q26593663
Bulford Barns	II	Bulford Mill Lane			21 October 1982	TL7739020474; 51°51′17″N 0°34′28″E		1168650	Upload Photo	Q26461894
Bulford Farmhouse	II	Bulford Mill Lane			21 October 1982	TL7741820419; 51°51′15″N 0°34′29″E		1337618	Upload Photo	Q26622018
Bulford Mill	II	Bulford Mill Lane			29 July 1988	TL7733020396; 51°51′14″N 0°34′24″E		1168640	Upload Photo	Q26461885
Bulford Mill House	II	Bulford Mill Lane			29 July 1988	TL7734720381; 51°51′14″N 0°34′25″E		1123857	Upload Photo	Q26416946
Number 1 (springwaters ) and Number 2 (tithings)	II	1, Church Road			29 July 1988	TL7937920476; 51°51′15″N 0°36′12″E		1123858	Upload Photo	Q26416947
Barn 30 Metres North of Cresley's Farmhouse	II	Church Road			29 July 1988	TL7998519534; 51°50′43″N 0°36′41″E		1123859	Upload Photo	Q26416948
Barn 55 Metres North West of Cresley's Farmhouse	II	Church Road			3 April 1986	TL7993619539; 51°50′44″N 0°36′39″E		1278016	Upload Photo	Q26567388
Cresley's Farmhouse	II	Church Road			29 July 1988	TL8002519458; 51°50′41″N 0°36′43″E		1168706	Upload Photo	Q26461947
Horseshoes	II	Church Road			29 July 1988	TL7939020444; 51°51′14″N 0°36′12″E		1168666	Upload Photo	Q26461910
Parish Church of All Saints	I	Church Road	church building		21 December 1967	TL7942620435; 51°51′13″N 0°36′14″E		1337619	Parish Church of All Saints More images	Q17536164
Appletree Farm Cottage	II	Hawbush Green			29 July 1988	TL7878720395; 51°51′13″N 0°35′40″E		1337620	Upload Photo	Q26622019
Hawbush Old House	II	Hawbush Green			2 May 1953	TL7857420365; 51°51′12″N 0°35′29″E		1306872	Upload Photo	Q26593602
The Bakery	II	Hawbush Green			29 July 1988	TL7877020374; 51°51′12″N 0°35′40″E		1306849	Upload Photo	Q26593581
Red Lion Cottages	II	1, Lanham Green Road			29 July 1988	TL7928921116; 51°51′35″N 0°36′08″E		1123860	Upload Photo	Q26416949
Barn 20 Metres North West of Schill's Farmhouse	II	Lanham Green Road			2 September 1983	TL7931221120; 51°51′35″N 0°36′09″E		1168786	Upload Photo	Q26462026
Barn 25 Metres South West of Schill's Farmhouse	II	Lanham Green Road			2 September 1983	TL7929821081; 51°51′34″N 0°36′08″E		1337582	Upload Photo	Q26621986
Schill's Farmhouse	II	Lanham Green Road			2 September 1983	TL7934421072; 51°51′34″N 0°36′11″E		1123861	Upload Photo	Q26416950
Barn 20 Metres East of Stubble's Farmhouse	II	Mill Lane			29 July 1988	TL7826520140; 51°51′05″N 0°35′13″E		1123862	Upload Photo	Q26416951
Jeffrey's Farmhouse	II	Mill Lane			29 July 1988	TL7793320301; 51°51′11″N 0°34′56″E		1168797	Upload Photo	Q26462036
Ancillary Building 3 Metres North West of Rook Hall Farmhouse	II	The Street			29 July 1988	TL7923420645; 51°51′20″N 0°36′04″E		1337583	Upload Photo	Q26621987
Ancillary Building 30 Metres East of Rook Hall Farmhouse	II	The Street			29 July 1988	TL7927720629; 51°51′20″N 0°36′06″E		1123863	Upload Photo	Q26416952
Barn 20 Metres South East of Rook Hall Farmhouse	II	The Street			29 July 1988	TL7925720616; 51°51′19″N 0°36′05″E		1306811	Upload Photo	Q26593545
Grimwoods (former Post Office)	II	The Street			29 July 1988	TL7928620706; 51°51′22″N 0°36′07″E		1306817	Upload Photo	Q26593551
Rook Hall Farmhouse	II	The Street			21 December 1967	TL7923820634; 51°51′20″N 0°36′04″E		1306803	Upload Photo	Q26593537
The Willows Public House	II	The Street	pub		29 July 1988	TL7929820770; 51°51′24″N 0°36′08″E		1337584	The Willows Public House More images	Q26621988
The Wheat Barn, 35 Metres North East of Cressing Temple Farmhouse	I	35 Metres North East Of Cressing Temple Farmhouse, Witham Road	barn		2 May 1953	TL7994218771; 51°50′19″N 0°36′38″E		1123866	The Wheat Barn, 35 Metres North East of Cressing Temple Farmhouse More images	Q17535942
The Barley Barn, 40 Metres North West of Cressing Temple Farmhouse	I	40 Metres North West Of Cressing Temple Farmhouse, Witham Road	barn		2 May 1953	TL7989318774; 51°50′19″N 0°36′35″E		1123865	The Barley Barn, 40 Metres North West of Cressing Temple Farmhouse More images	Q17535932
Barn 20 Metres North West of Newbarns Farmhouse	II	Witham Road			29 July 1988	TL7899919959; 51°50′58″N 0°35′51″E		1168879	Upload Photo	Q26462104
Cressing Temple Farmhouse	II	Witham Road			2 May 1953	TL7991818724; 51°50′17″N 0°36′36″E		1168891	Upload Photo	Q26462115
Granary/stables Block 70 Metres South of Cressing Temple Farmhouse	II	Witham Road			21 December 1967	TL7991118632; 51°50′14″N 0°36′36″E		1123867	Upload Photo	Q26416954
Hungry Hall Farmhouse	II	Witham Road			29 July 1988	TL8026718059; 51°49′55″N 0°36′53″E		1123868	Upload Photo	Q26416955
Waggon Lodge Approximately 40 Metres South of Cressing Temple Farmhouse	II	Witham Road			3 April 1986	TL7989718605; 51°50′13″N 0°36′35″E		1169011	Upload Photo	Q26462233
Wall Enclosing Walled Garden Approx 15 Metres East of Cressing Temple Farmhouse	II	Witham Road			3 April 1986	TL7997218756; 51°50′18″N 0°36′39″E		1168978	Upload Photo	Q26462201
William and Mary Cottages	II	Witham Road			23 January 1980	TL7979918901; 51°50′23″N 0°36′30″E		1123864	Upload Photo	Q26416953

== See also ==
- Grade I listed buildings in Essex
- Grade II* listed buildings in Essex

== Sources ==
- Bettley, James; Pevsner, Nikolaus (2007) [1954], Essex, The Buildings of England, New Haven and London: Yale University Press, ISBN 978-0-300-11614-4
