= Listed buildings in Gestingthorpe =

Historic structures in Essex, England

Gestingthorpe is a village and civil parish in the Braintree District of Essex, England. It contains 57 listed buildings that are recorded in the National Heritage List for England. Of these one is grade I, two are grade II* and 54 are grade II.

This list is based on the information retrieved online from Historic England.

== Key ==
Grade	Criteria
I	Buildings that are of exceptional interest
II*	Particularly important buildings of more than special interest
II	Buildings that are of special interest

== Listing ==
Name	Grade	Location	Type	Completed (Note: The date given is the date used by Historic England as significant for the initial building or that of an important part in the structure's description.)	Date designated	Grid ref. (Note: The grid reference is based on the British national grid reference system, sometimes known as OSGB36, used by the Ordnance Survey.) Geo-coordinates	Notes	Entry number (Note: The "List Entry Number" is a unique number assigned to each listed building and scheduled monument by Historic England.)	Image	Wikidata
Milestone on Southern Verge Approximately 250 Metres West of Moat Farm Corner Tl814 267	II	Bulmer Road B1058			19 July 1984	TL8140636635; 51°59′55″N 0°38′28″E		1308577	Upload Photo	Q26595163
Ardsley	II	Audley End			19 July 1984	TL8131337493; 52°00′23″N 0°38′25″E		1147305	Upload Photo	Q26440360
Audley Cottage and Baytree House	II	Audley End			19 July 1984	TL8125137715; 52°00′30″N 0°38′22″E		1122284	Upload Photo	Q26415429
Cottage Approximately 16 Metres North of the Pheasant Public House	II	Audley End			19 July 1984	TL8124937700; 52°00′29″N 0°38′22″E		1147330	Upload Photo	Q26440382
Cottage Approximately 7 Metres North of the Pheasant Public House	II	Audley End			19 July 1984	TL8125437683; 52°00′29″N 0°38′22″E		1122283	Upload Photo	Q26415428
Delvyn's Cottage Including Attached Wall Enclosing Front Garden	II	Audley End			19 July 1984	TL8121138018; 52°00′40″N 0°38′20″E		1338394	Upload Photo	Q26622719
Delvyn's Farm Barn Approximately 70 Metres North West of House	II	Audley End			19 July 1984	TL8124537968; 52°00′38″N 0°38′22″E		1147342	Upload Photo	Q26440393
Delvyn's Farmhouse	II	Audley End			19 July 1984	TL8126837914; 52°00′36″N 0°38′23″E		1122285	Upload Photo	Q26415430
Rectory Farm Barn Approx 7 Metres North East of House	II	Audley End			19 July 1984	TL8136737491; 52°00′22″N 0°38′28″E		1122282	Upload Photo	Q26415427
Rectory Farmhouse	II	Audley End			19 July 1984	TL8139337470; 52°00′22″N 0°38′29″E		1365610	Upload Photo	Q26647283
Parkgate Farmhouse	II	Delvyn's Lane			21 June 1962	TL8025137050; 52°00′09″N 0°37′28″E		1147364	Upload Photo	Q26440412
Edey's Farmhouse	II	Delvyns Lane			19 July 1984	TL8041537510; 52°00′24″N 0°37′38″E		1338395	Upload Photo	Q26622720
Edey's Farmhouse Barn Approximately 10 Metres South East of House	II	Delvyns Lane			19 July 1984	TL8043037492; 52°00′24″N 0°37′38″E		1147401	Upload Photo	Q26440438
Parkgate Farm Farm Outbuildings Approximately 90 Metres West of House	II	Delvyns Lane			19 July 1984	TL8018037092; 52°00′11″N 0°37′25″E		1122287	Upload Photo	Q26415433
Parkgate Farm Stables and Cart Lodges Approximately 90 Metres South West of House	II	Delvyns Lane			19 July 1984	TL8017637036; 52°00′09″N 0°37′24″E		1147386	Upload Photo	Q26440427
Little Chelmshoe House	II	Great Maplestead Road			19 July 1984	TL8118935877; 51°59′30″N 0°38′15″E		1147413	Upload Photo	Q26440448
Little Chelmshoe House Barn Approximately 14 Metres North East of House	II	Great Maplestead Road			19 July 1984	TL8118935878; 51°59′30″N 0°38′15″E		1122289	Upload Photo	Q26415435
Little Chelmshoe House Wall Adjacent to Road Enclosing Yard Between Barn and Outbuilding Qv 2/20	II	Great Maplestead Road			19 July 1984	TL8119435858; 51°59′30″N 0°38′15″E		1122290	Upload Photo	Q26415436
Odewells	II	Great Maplestead Road			19 July 1984	TL8138236036; 51°59′35″N 0°38′26″E		1122288	Upload Photo	Q26415434
Odewells Barn Approximatelly 40 Metres North East of House	II	Great Maplestead Road			19 July 1984	TL8137936034; 51°59′35″N 0°38′25″E		1338356	Upload Photo	Q26622687
Old House	II	Little Maplestead Road			19 July 1984	TL8215035771; 51°59′26″N 0°39′05″E		1147463	Upload Photo	Q26440489
Tudor Lodge Barn Approximately 100 Metres South East of House	II	Little Maplestead Road			19 July 1984	TL8212436312; 51°59′43″N 0°39′05″E		1338357	Upload Photo	Q26622688
Tudor Lodge Pump in Front Garden West of House	II	Little Maplestead Road			19 July 1984	TL8206436360; 51°59′45″N 0°39′02″E		1308537	Upload Photo	Q26595129
Foundry House	II	Little Yeldham Road			19 July 1984	TL8114638791; 52°01′05″N 0°38′18″E		1123066	Upload Photo	Q26416161
Crouch House	II	Moat Street			19 July 1984	TL8150537066; 52°00′08″N 0°38′34″E		1123073	Upload Photo	Q26416168
Moat Farm Barn Approximately 100 Metres South East of House	II	Moat Street			19 July 1984	TL8165936750; 51°59′58″N 0°38′41″E		1123069	Upload Photo	Q26416164
Moat Farm Barn Approximately 60 Metres South East of House	II	Moat Street			19 July 1984	TL8163836793; 52°00′00″N 0°38′40″E		1123067	Upload Photo	Q26416162
Moat Farm Cart Lodge Approximately 130 Metres South of House	II	Moat Street			19 July 1984	TL8161036718; 51°59′57″N 0°38′39″E		1123070	Upload Photo	Q26416165
Moat Farm Dovecote Approximately 25 Metres East of House	II	Moat Street			7 August 1952	TL8162036832; 52°00′01″N 0°38′40″E		1123068	Upload Photo	Q26416163
Moat Farmhouse	II*	Moat Street	farmhouse		7 August 1952	TL8159136824; 52°00′01″N 0°38′38″E		1337982	Moat Farmhouse More images	Q17557909
Seven Sisters Cottage	II	Moat Street			19 July 1984	TL8165336854; 52°00′01″N 0°38′41″E		1123071	Upload Photo	Q26416166
The Old Cottage	II	Moat Street			19 July 1984	TL8164736880; 52°00′02″N 0°38′41″E		1123072	Upload Photo	Q26416167
Nether Hall Barn Approximately 50 Metres North of Hall	II	Nether Hill			19 July 1984	TL8098239311; 52°01′22″N 0°38′11″E		1337983	Upload Photo	Q26622336
Nether Hall Farm Outbuildings Adjacent to Road and Approximately 50 Metres North West Ofr Hall	II	Nether Hill, Nether Hall			19 July 1984	TL8096239283; 52°01′21″N 0°38′10″E		1123074	Upload Photo	Q26416169
Bridge Cottage	II	North End			19 July 1984	TL7912839019; 52°01′14″N 0°36′33″E		1123075	Upload Photo	Q26416170
Brook Cottage	II	North End			8 January 1982	TL7916239014; 52°01′14″N 0°36′35″E		1168103	Upload Photo	Q26493593
By Road Cottage	II	Pot Kiln Chase			19 July 1984	TL8170438897; 52°01′07″N 0°38′48″E		1123076	Upload Photo	Q26416171
North Pott Cottage South Pott Cottage	II	Pot Kiln Chase			19 July 1984	TL8169838847; 52°01′06″N 0°38′47″E		1168109	Upload Photo	Q26493598
Pot Kilns	II	Pot Kiln Chase			19 July 1984	TL8168738791; 52°01′04″N 0°38′47″E		1337984	Upload Photo	Q26622337
Hill Farm Barn Approximately 10 Metres East of House	II	Sudbury Road			19 July 1984	TL8220639086; 52°01′13″N 0°39′15″E		1168123	Upload Photo	Q26493612
Hill Farm Cart Lodge Adjoining Guild Hall to East Qv 2/44	II	Sudbury Road			19 July 1984	TL8224539095; 52°01′13″N 0°39′17″E		1168137	Upload Photo	Q26493625
Hill Farm Outbuilding Former Guild Hall Adjoining Barn to East Qv 2/43	II	Sudbury Road			19 July 1984	TL8222339092; 52°01′13″N 0°39′15″E		1123077	Upload Photo	Q26416172
K6 Telephone Kiosk by Village Hall	II	The Green			21 April 1988	TL8118838596; 52°00′58″N 0°38′20″E		1123037	Upload Photo	Q26416130
Church Cottages	II	1 and 2, The Street			21 June 1961	TL8117938526; 52°00′56″N 0°38′20″E		1337986	Upload Photo	Q26622339
Alveston Cottage	II	The Street			19 July 1984	TL8125238234; 52°00′47″N 0°38′23″E		1123080	Upload Photo	Q26416174
Ashley Cottage	II	The Street			19 July 1984	TL8120638632; 52°00′59″N 0°38′21″E		1337985	Upload Photo	Q26622338
Church Farmhouse	II	The Street			19 July 1984	TL8117438499; 52°00′55″N 0°38′19″E		1168223	Upload Photo	Q26493707
Church of St Mary the Virgin	I	The Street	church building		21 June 1962	TL8122038562; 52°00′57″N 0°38′22″E		1123078	Church of St Mary the Virgin More images	Q17535866
Church of St Mary the Virgin Headstone Approximately 10 Metres East of East Window and North of Item 4/77	II	The Street			19 July 1984	TL8124038565; 52°00′57″N 0°38′23″E		1123079	Upload Photo	Q26416173
Church of St Mary the Virgin Headstone Approximately 10 Metres East of East Window and South of Item 4/78	II	The Street			19 July 1984	TL8124138559; 52°00′57″N 0°38′23″E		1168206	Upload Photo	Q26493690
Gestingthorpe Hall	II*	The Street			7 August 1952	TL8103838652; 52°01′00″N 0°38′13″E		1307107	Upload Photo	Q17557754
Gestingthorpe Hall Dovecote Approximately 100 Metes South East of Hall	II	The Street			7 August 1952	TL8112538573; 52°00′58″N 0°38′17″E		1307114	Upload Photo	Q26593817
Gestingthorpe Hall Outbuilding Approximately 20 Metres North West of Hall	II	The Street			19 July 1984	TL8102838666; 52°01′01″N 0°38′12″E		1337987	Upload Photo	Q26622340
The Rectory	II	The Street			19 July 1984	TL8123838610; 52°00′59″N 0°38′23″E		1307147	Upload Photo	Q26593848
The Thatched Cottage	II	The Street			19 July 1984	TL8120838308; 52°00′49″N 0°38′21″E		1168257	Upload Photo	Q26461523
Tong Cottage	II	The Street			19 July 1984	TL8119938324; 52°00′50″N 0°38′20″E		1123081	Upload Photo	Q26416175
White Cottage	II	Wesborough Hill			19 July 1984	TL8311838302; 52°00′47″N 0°40′01″E		1337988	Upload Photo	Q26622341

== See also ==
- Grade I listed buildings in Essex
- Grade II* listed buildings in Essex

== Sources ==
- Bettley, James; Pevsner, Nikolaus (2007) [1954], Essex, The Buildings of England, New Haven and London: Yale University Press, ISBN 978-0-300-11614-4
