= Listed buildings in Gosfield =

Historic structures in Essex, England

Gosfield is a village and civil parish in the Braintree District of Essex, England. It contains 53 listed buildings that are recorded in the National Heritage List for England. Of these two are grade I, one is grade II* and 50 are grade II.

This list is based on the information retrieved online from Historic England.

== Key ==
Grade	Criteria
I	Buildings that are of exceptional interest
II*	Particularly important buildings of more than special interest
II	Buildings that are of special interest

== Listing ==
Name	Grade	Location	Type	Completed (Note: The date given is the date used by Historic England as significant for the initial building or that of an important part in the structure's description.)	Date designated	Grid ref. (Note: The grid reference is based on the British national grid reference system, sometimes known as OSGB36, used by the Ordnance Survey.) Geo-coordinates	Notes	Entry number (Note: The "List Entry Number" is a unique number assigned to each listed building and scheduled monument by Historic England.)	Image	Wikidata
Sparrows Bridge	II				25 January 1993	TL7888329235; 51°55′58″N 0°36′02″E		1276401	Upload Photo	Q26565917
Highgates Cottages	II*	1, 2 and 3, Church Road			7 August 1952	TL7810429538; 51°56′09″N 0°35′22″E		1122936	Upload Photo	Q17557213
Church of St Catherine, Tomb of the English Poor Clares Approximately 12 Metres North West of North West Tower Angle	II	Church Road			15 October 1984	TL7774629386; 51°56′05″N 0°35′03″E		1122935	Upload Photo	Q26416041
Church of St Catherine, Table Tomb Approximately 20 Metres South West of South Porch	II	Church Road			15 October 1984	TL7776629373; 51°56′04″N 0°35′04″E		1169280	Upload Photo	Q26462478
Byford Cottage Gosfield Antiques	II	Church Road			21 June 1962	TL7823929570; 51°56′10″N 0°35′29″E		1122937	Upload Photo	Q26416042
Church of St Catherine	I	Church Road	church building		21 June 1962	TL7778129403; 51°56′05″N 0°35′05″E		1338075	Church of St Catherine More images	Q17536280
Rosemary Cottage	II	Church Road, CO9 1TL			15 October 1984	TL7814529544; 51°56′09″N 0°35′24″E		1169329	Upload Photo	Q26462523
The Old Vicarage	II	Church Road			4 February 1976	TL7788729479; 51°56′07″N 0°35′10″E		1169303	Upload Photo	Q26462499
Gosfield Hall, Four Gas Lamps in Courtyard	II	Hall Drive			15 October 1984	TL7748629723; 51°56′16″N 0°34′50″E		1122939	Upload Photo	Q26416043
Bounces Farm, Pump in Front Garden Approximately 10 Metres East of House	II	Hall Drive			15 October 1984	TL7628330843; 51°56′53″N 0°33′49″E		1122908	Upload Photo	Q26416013
Bounces Farm, Barn Approximately 20 Metres North West of House	II	Hall Drive			15 October 1984	TL7624930866; 51°56′54″N 0°33′47″E		1338062	Upload Photo	Q26622409
Gosfield Hall, Horse Gin Approximately 20 Metres North West of North West Corner of Hall	II	Hall Drive			15 October 1984	TL7747929789; 51°56′18″N 0°34′50″E		1122904	Upload Photo	Q26416009
Home Farm, Walled Garden Approximately 20 Metres East of Home Farmhouse	II	TL 783311, Hall Drive			15 October 1984	TL7721130011; 51°56′25″N 0°34′36″E		1122907	Upload Photo	Q26416012
Gosfield Hall, Ha Ha Wall Approximately 50 Metres South of South Face of Hall Including Statues and Urns	II	Hall Drive			15 October 1984	TL7748029655; 51°56′14″N 0°34′49″E		1122903	Upload Photo	Q26416008
Bounces Farmhouse	II	Hall Drive			15 October 1984	TL7625430863; 51°56′54″N 0°33′47″E		1338061	Upload Photo	Q26622408
Gosfield Hall	I	Hall Drive	English country house		1 March 1960	TL7751229713; 51°56′15″N 0°34′51″E		1122938	Gosfield Hall More images	Q5587170
Home Farm Cottages	II	Hall Drive			15 October 1984	TL7709430151; 51°56′30″N 0°34′30″E		1122906	Upload Photo	Q26416011
North Lodge to Gosfield Hall	II	Hall Drive			7 August 1973	TL7818829776; 51°56′17″N 0°35′27″E		1122905	Upload Photo	Q26416010
St Margarets School Including Courtyard Wall and Gates	II	Hall Drive			15 October 1984	TL7752629885; 51°56′21″N 0°34′52″E		1338060	Upload Photo	Q26622407
Gosfield School	II	Halstead Road			15 October 1984	TL7898630619; 51°56′43″N 0°36′10″E		1169454	Upload Photo	Q99937462
1, Hedingham Road	II	1, Hedingham Road			15 October 1984	TL7820430100; 51°56′27″N 0°35′28″E		1306522	Upload Photo	Q26593293
Sharldlow's Farm, Barn Approximately 50 Metres East of Farmhouse	II	Hedingham Road			15 October 1984	TL7839930474; 51°56′39″N 0°35′39″E		1122910	Upload Photo	Q26416015
Milestone on East Verge of Road in Front of Westmead Bungalow and South of Cutmaple Garage	II	Hedingham Road			15 October 1984	TL7841531345; 51°57′07″N 0°35′41″E		1169499	Upload Photo	Q26462691
Hawkwood's	II	Liston Hall Lane			15 October 1984	TL7619931383; 51°57′11″N 0°33′46″E		1169510	Upload Photo	Q26462704
Liston Hall Farmhouse	II	Liston Hall Lane			21 June 1962	TL7665631338; 51°57′09″N 0°34′09″E		1122911	Upload Photo	Q26416016
Beechley Fields Farmhouse	II	Parkhall Road			23 February 1981	TL7537329330; 51°56′05″N 0°32′59″E		1233865	Upload Photo	Q26527304
Old Home Cottage	II	Parkhall Road			15 October 1984	TL7533429362; 51°56′07″N 0°32′57″E		1169524	Upload Photo	Q26462717
Parkhall Farmhouse	II	Parkhall Road			15 October 1984	TL7623929395; 51°56′07″N 0°33′44″E		1338064	Upload Photo	Q26622411
Primrose Cottage	II	Parkhall Road			15 October 1984	TL7528929348; 51°56′06″N 0°32′54″E		1122912	Upload Photo	Q26416017
Peterfields Barn, Adjoining Road and Approximately 100 Metres North East of Farmhouse	II	Peterfields Lane			15 October 1984	TL7846228260; 51°55′27″N 0°35′38″E		1169547	Upload Photo	Q26462740
Gosfield School, Stable Block to Left of House	II	Halstead Road			15 October 1984	TL7895730581; 51°56′42″N 0°36′08″E		1338063	Upload Photo	Q26622410
Park Cottages	II	1 and 2, The Street			15 October 1984	TL7826829900; 51°56′21″N 0°35′31″E		1169591	Upload Photo	Q26462777
Park Cottages	II	3 and 4, The Street			15 October 1984	TL7826429872; 51°56′20″N 0°35′31″E		1122918	Upload Photo	Q26416023
Park Cottages	II	5 and 6, The Street			15 October 1984	TL7826329844; 51°56′19″N 0°35′31″E		1169598	Upload Photo	Q26462783
Park Cottages	II	7 and 8, The Street			15 October 1984	TL7826629816; 51°56′18″N 0°35′31″E		1122919	Upload Photo	Q26416024
Street Farm, Barn Approximately 20 Metres South of House	II	The Street			15 October 1984	TL7845829207; 51°55′58″N 0°35′40″E		1122916	Upload Photo	Q26416021
Bridge House	II	The Street			15 October 1984	TL7851729091; 51°55′54″N 0°35′43″E		1169582	Upload Photo	Q26462768
Broom Cottage	II	The Street			15 October 1984	TL7831329566; 51°56′10″N 0°35′33″E		1169568	Upload Photo	Q26462757
Communal Bakehouse Adjacent to Right of 18 Park Cottages	II	The Street			15 October 1984	TL7834929596; 51°56′11″N 0°35′35″E		1169664	Upload Photo	Q26462843
Dial Cottage Dial House	II	The Street			21 June 1962	TL7848729279; 51°56′00″N 0°35′41″E		1122884	Upload Photo	Q26415991
Gable Cottage	II	The Street			15 October 1984	TL7833429510; 51°56′08″N 0°35′34″E		1169577	Upload Photo	Q26462764
Gosfield Cars Garage and House Adjoining	II	The Street			21 June 1962	TL7825029633; 51°56′12″N 0°35′30″E		1338065	Upload Photo	Q26622412
Gosfield Cottage and Attached Forecourt Railings	II	The Street			15 October 1984	TL7838229406; 51°56′04″N 0°35′36″E		1122883	Upload Photo	Q26415990
Green Man Public House	II	The Street	pub		9 February 1984	TL7837229463; 51°56′06″N 0°35′36″E		1338089	Green Man Public House More images	Q26622435
Holly Cottage and Adjoining Dwelling	II	The Street			15 October 1984	TL7829329575; 51°56′10″N 0°35′32″E		1122913	Upload Photo	Q26416018
House Adjoining Post Office Stores to Right Post Office Stores	II	The Street			15 October 1984	TL7836729483; 51°56′07″N 0°35′35″E		1122882	Upload Photo	Q26415989
Mansarde Cottage	II	The Street			15 October 1984	TL7834029519; 51°56′08″N 0°35′34″E		1122914	Upload Photo	Q26416019
Sparrows	II	The Street			21 June 1962	TL7853429079; 51°55′54″N 0°35′43″E		1122917	Upload Photo	Q26416022
Street Farmhouse	II	The Street			15 October 1984	TL7846029218; 51°55′58″N 0°35′40″E		1122915	Upload Photo	Q26416020
The King's Head Inn	II	The Street	inn		7 August 1952	TL7827329596; 51°56′11″N 0°35′31″E		1306477	The King's Head Inn More images	Q26593254
The Reading and Coffee Rooms	II	The Street			15 October 1984	TL7829829638; 51°56′12″N 0°35′32″E		1122920	Upload Photo	Q26416025
Gosfield Hall, Well House Adjacent to North East of Horse Gin	II	Hall Drive			15 October 1984	TL7748529791; 51°56′18″N 0°34′50″E		1338059	Upload Photo	Q26622406
Gosfield School, Well House to Rear of House	II	Halstead Road			15 October 1984	TL7892230654; 51°56′44″N 0°36′07″E		1122909	Upload Photo	Q26416014

== See also ==
- Grade I listed buildings in Essex
- Grade II* listed buildings in Essex

== Sources ==
- Bettley, James; Pevsner, Nikolaus (2007) [1954], Essex, The Buildings of England, New Haven and London: Yale University Press, ISBN 978-0-300-11614-4
