= Listed buildings in Great Bardfield =

Historic structures in Essex, England

Great Bardfield is a village and civil parish in the Braintree District of Essex, England. It contains 102 listed buildings that are recorded in the National Heritage List for England. Of these two are grade I, six are grade II* and 94 are grade II.

This list is based on the information retrieved online from Historic England.

== Key ==
Grade	Criteria
I	Buildings that are of exceptional interest
II*	Particularly important buildings of more than special interest
II	Buildings that are of special interest

== Listing ==
Name	Grade	Location	Type	Completed (Note: The date given is the date used by Historic England as significant for the initial building or that of an important part in the structure's description.)	Date designated	Grid ref. (Note: The grid reference is based on the British national grid reference system, sometimes known as OSGB36, used by the Ordnance Survey.) Geo-coordinates	Notes	Entry number (Note: The "List Entry Number" is a unique number assigned to each listed building and scheduled monument by Historic England.)	Image	Wikidata
Barn at Bushett Farm	II				17 May 1985	TL6726428348; 51°55′43″N 0°25′53″E		1337799	Upload Photo	Q26622176
Great Bardfield Quaker Meeting House	II	CM7 4RQ			21 December 1967	TL6759530561; 51°56′54″N 0°26′14″E		1123465	Upload Photo	Q26416559
1 and 2, Bell Lane	II	1 and 2, Bell Lane			27 February 1979	TL6740830546; 51°56′54″N 0°26′04″E		1123493	Upload Photo	Q26416584
Great Pitley Farmhouse	II	Beslyns Road			17 May 1985	TL6634732707; 51°58′05″N 0°25′12″E		1145892	Upload Photo	Q26439047
Barn Approximately 45 Metres East of Great Lodge	I	Braintree Road			2 May 1953	TL6948929061; 51°56′03″N 0°27′50″E		1335863	Upload Photo	Q17536133
Barn Approximately 60 Metres South South West of Great Bardfield Hall	II*	Braintree Road			17 May 1985	TL6773230184; 51°56′42″N 0°26′20″E		1337760	Upload Photo	Q17557831
Barn Approximately 80 Metres North West of Bluegate Hall Farmhouse	II	Braintree Road			9 May 1979	TL6869529801; 51°56′28″N 0°27′10″E		1123497	Upload Photo	Q26416587
Barn Approximately 80 Metres South East of Park Hall	II	Braintree Road			17 May 1985	TL7001828600; 51°55′48″N 0°28′17″E		1087006	Upload Photo	Q26379497
Bluegate Hall Farmhouse	II	Braintree Road			9 May 1979	TL6876429749; 51°56′26″N 0°27′14″E		1335852	Upload Photo	Q26620408
Granary/cartlodge Approximately 80 Metres East South East of Park Hall	II	Braintree Road			17 May 1985	TL7003228654; 51°55′50″N 0°28′18″E		1123502	Upload Photo	Q26416591
Great Bardfield Hall	II	Braintree Road			2 May 1953	TL6779330269; 51°56′44″N 0°26′24″E		1087112	Upload Photo	Q26379585
Great Lodge	II*	Braintree Road			2 May 1953	TL6942929048; 51°56′03″N 0°27′47″E		1123499	Upload Photo	Q17557374
Little Lodge	II	Braintree Road			17 May 1985	TL6846128236; 51°55′38″N 0°26′55″E		1335848	Upload Photo	Q26620404
Lower Hall	II	Braintree Road			17 May 1985	TL6787330367; 51°56′47″N 0°26′28″E		1123496	Upload Photo	Q26416586
Parish Church of St Mary the Virgin	I	Braintree Road	church building		21 December 1967	TL6780030368; 51°56′47″N 0°26′24″E		1123494	Parish Church of St Mary the Virgin More images	Q17535911
Park Hall	II	Braintree Road			17 May 1985	TL7003128640; 51°55′49″N 0°28′18″E		1123501	Upload Photo	Q26416590
Shelter Shed Approximately 60 Metres North West of Bluegate Hall Farmhouse	II	Braintree Road			9 May 1979	TL6869929781; 51°56′27″N 0°27′10″E		1335873	Upload Photo	Q26620424
Stable Block Approximately 40 Metres North West of Bluegate Hall Farmhouse	II	Braintree Road			9 May 1979	TL6875029788; 51°56′28″N 0°27′13″E		1123498	Upload Photo	Q26416588
Vicarage Cottage	II	Braintree Road			25 June 1974	TL6788330391; 51°56′48″N 0°26′29″E		1123495	Upload Photo	Q26416585
Wall Extending Eastwards from Barn of Great Lodge	II	Braintree Road			17 May 1985	TL6951129050; 51°56′03″N 0°27′51″E		1123500	Upload Photo	Q26416589
Wall Extending West from Stable Block at Bluegate Hall Farmhouse	II	Braintree Road			9 May 1979	TL6874029775; 51°56′27″N 0°27′12″E		1087027	Upload Photo	Q26379513
York House	II	Braintree Road			17 May 1985	TL6784330397; 51°56′48″N 0°26′26″E		1186771	Upload Photo	Q26482007
Bridge Farmhouse	II	Bridge End			17 May 1985	TL6755431074; 51°57′10″N 0°26′13″E		1087007	Upload Photo	Q26379498
Gatehouse Cottage	II	Bridge End			17 May 1985	TL6758631075; 51°57′10″N 0°26′14″E		1335870	Upload Photo	Q26620421
Road Bridge Over the River Pant	II	Bridge End	road bridge		17 May 1985	TL6753830942; 51°57′06″N 0°26′11″E		1335871	Road Bridge Over the River Pant More images	Q26620422
Valley Cottage	II	Bridge End			21 December 1967	TL6752230972; 51°57′07″N 0°26′11″E		1123503	Upload Photo	Q26416592
Wellington Cottage	II	Bridge End			19 September 1980	TL6756331037; 51°57′09″N 0°26′13″E		1337761	Upload Photo	Q26622146
Beam Cottage Cage Cottage	II	Bridge Street			21 December 1967	TL6758830665; 51°56′57″N 0°26′14″E		1335889	Upload Photo	Q26620438
Cage House	II	Bridge Street			21 December 1967	TL6757630680; 51°56′58″N 0°26′13″E		1086994	Upload Photo	Q26379488
Kalon Shepherd's Cottage Shepherd's Place	II	Bridge Street			17 May 1985	TL6754430843; 51°57′03″N 0°26′12″E		1123504	Upload Photo	Q26416593
Northampton House	II	Bridge Street			2 December 1982	TL6756230758; 51°57′00″N 0°26′12″E		1337762	Upload Photo	Q26622147
The Great Bardfield Cage	II	Bridge Street			17 May 1985	TL6758830674; 51°56′58″N 0°26′14″E		1123505	Upload Photo	Q26416594
Fountain Terrace	II	1 and 2, Brook Street			18 May 1978	TL6771230516; 51°56′52″N 0°26′20″E		1123464	Upload Photo	Q26416558
6, 7 and 8, Brook Street	II*	6, 7 and 8, Brook Street			21 December 1967	TL6767530554; 51°56′54″N 0°26′18″E		1123467	Upload Photo	Q17557338
Brook House	II	Brook Street			21 December 1967	TL6767630522; 51°56′53″N 0°26′18″E		1337784	Upload Photo	Q26622162
Cottage Between Tudor Cottage and Markswood Gallery Markswood Gallery Tudor Cottage	II	Brook Street			21 December 1967	TL6762830551; 51°56′54″N 0°26′16″E		1337786	Upload Photo	Q26622164
Cottesbrook	II	Brook Street			18 May 1978	TL6770230520; 51°56′52″N 0°26′19″E		1123463	Upload Photo	Q26416557
Drinking Fountain in Front of Number 3 Fountain Terrace	II	Brook Street			17 May 1985	TL6772830522; 51°56′52″N 0°26′21″E		1337785	Upload Photo	Q26622163
Hillside Cottage the Homestead	II	Brook Street			21 December 1967	TL6759030525; 51°56′53″N 0°26′13″E		1337763	Upload Photo	Q26622148
King's House	II	Brook Street			17 May 1985	TL6772530550; 51°56′53″N 0°26′21″E		1337787	Upload Photo	Q26622165
Serjeant Bendlowes Cottage	II	Brook Street			21 December 1967	TL6765630551; 51°56′53″N 0°26′17″E		1123466	Upload Photo	Q26416560
The Firs	II	Brook Street			21 December 1967	TL6762830523; 51°56′53″N 0°26′15″E		1335913	Upload Photo	Q26620460
The White Hart	II	Brook Street			2 May 1953	TL6765030527; 51°56′53″N 0°26′17″E		1123506	Upload Photo	Q26416595
White Hart House	II	Brook Street			2 May 1953	TL6764630510; 51°56′52″N 0°26′16″E		1086946	Upload Photo	Q26379357
Barn Approximately 95 Metres North West of Beslyns Farmhouse	II	Cooks Lane			14 February 1985	TL6691431823; 51°57′35″N 0°25′40″E		1326656	Upload Photo	Q26612125
Beslyns Cottage	II	Cooks Lane			14 February 1985	TL6692331843; 51°57′36″N 0°25′41″E		1123468	Upload Photo	Q26416561
Stable Block Approximately 80 Metres of Beslyns Farmhouse	II	Cooks Lane			14 February 1985	TL6692431776; 51°57′34″N 0°25′41″E		1337788	Upload Photo	Q26622166
Crown House	II	Crown Street			17 May 1985	TL6763430596; 51°56′55″N 0°26′16″E		1123470	Upload Photo	Q26416563
Lumleys	II	Crown Street			17 May 1985	TL6762830609; 51°56′55″N 0°26′16″E		1104898	Upload Photo	Q26398861
North Place Saddlers	II	Crown Street			17 May 1985	TL6762030638; 51°56′56″N 0°26′15″E		1123469	Upload Photo	Q26416562
Charity Farmhouse	II	Dunmow Road			17 May 1985	TL6651729575; 51°56′23″N 0°25′16″E		1104903	Upload Photo	Q26398864
Coach House/stable Block Approximately 10 Metres North East of South Lodge	II	Dunmow Road			17 May 1985	TL6737330296; 51°56′46″N 0°26′02″E		1104905	Upload Photo	Q26398866
Dell Cottage Vane Cottage	II	Dunmow Road			27 March 1985	TL6730430224; 51°56′43″N 0°25′58″E		1123471	Upload Photo	Q26416564
Devon Wayside Cottage	II	Dunmow Road			18 March 1985	TL6729830218; 51°56′43″N 0°25′58″E		1104913	Upload Photo	Q26398872
South Lodge	II	Dunmow Road			17 May 1985	TL6735930281; 51°56′45″N 0°26′01″E		1337789	Upload Photo	Q26622167
Hill Cottages Primrose Cottage	II	1 and 2, High Street			16 October 1981	TL6746230418; 51°56′49″N 0°26′07″E		1105649	Upload Photo	Q26399585
Oak Cottages	II	1 and 2, High Street			17 May 1985	TL6742830403; 51°56′49″N 0°26′05″E		1337790	Upload Photo	Q26622168
2-4, High Street	II	2-4, High Street			21 December 1967	TL6754330515; 51°56′52″N 0°26′11″E		1104848	Upload Photo	Q26398816
5, High Street	II	5, High Street			21 December 1967	TL6751630496; 51°56′52″N 0°26′10″E		1123479	Upload Photo	Q26416570
Bank House	II	High Street			21 December 1967	TL6753630548; 51°56′54″N 0°26′11″E		1326668	Upload Photo	Q26612135
Bardfield Cottage Museum	II	High Street			17 May 1985	TL6744030386; 51°56′48″N 0°26′05″E		1123482	Upload Photo	Q26416573
Barn Approximately 40 Metres East North East of Place House	II	High Street			28 March 1985	TL6745630345; 51°56′47″N 0°26′06″E		1123483	Upload Photo	Q26416574
Barn Approximately 40 Metres East of Place House	II	High Street			28 March 1985	TL6745730328; 51°56′46″N 0°26′06″E		1106238	Upload Photo	Q26400119
Box Cottage Pippins Cottage	II	High Street			21 December 1967	TL6751030492; 51°56′52″N 0°26′09″E		1326260	Upload Photo	Q26611755
Brick House	II	High Street			21 December 1967	TL6749630514; 51°56′52″N 0°26′09″E		1123475	Upload Photo	Q26416567
Byre Approximately 10 Metres South East	II	High Street			28 March 1985	TL6743130330; 51°56′47″N 0°26′05″E		1106381	Upload Photo	Q26400250
Cart Lodge Approximately 25 Metres South East of Place House	II	High Street			28 March 1985	TL6743930318; 51°56′46″N 0°26′05″E		1123484	Upload Photo	Q26416575
Chapel Cottage	II	High Street			2 May 1953	TL6739530326; 51°56′46″N 0°26′03″E		1337793	Upload Photo	Q26622170
Claypits Cottage	II	High Street			17 May 1985	TL6744630431; 51°56′50″N 0°26′06″E		1104880	Upload Photo	Q26398845
Ethel House	II	High Street			21 December 1967	TL6748830470; 51°56′51″N 0°26′08″E		1105643	Upload Photo	Q26399578
Gobions	II*	High Street			21 December 1967	TL6745430466; 51°56′51″N 0°26′06″E		1123473	Upload Photo	Q17557341
Hill Place	II	High Street			21 December 1967	TL6752730536; 51°56′53″N 0°26′10″E		1123477	Upload Photo	Q26416569
Hope Cottage	II	High Street			17 May 1985	TL6743930427; 51°56′50″N 0°26′05″E		1123472	Upload Photo	Q26416565
P and A Wood	II	High Street			21 December 1967	TL6748230463; 51°56′51″N 0°26′08″E		1123481	Upload Photo	Q26416572
Place House	II*	High Street			2 May 1953	TL6741030339; 51°56′47″N 0°26′04″E		1337792	Upload Photo	Q17557836
Rear Wing of Bank House	II*	High Street			21 December 1967	TL6753030562; 51°56′54″N 0°26′10″E		1123478	Upload Photo	Q17557344
South End	II	High Street			17 May 1985	TL6743730378; 51°56′48″N 0°26′05″E		1106247	Upload Photo	Q26400126
Telephone Kiosk Next to Post Office	II	High Street			24 February 1988	TL6748430492; 51°56′52″N 0°26′08″E		1123447	Upload Photo	Q26416544
The Bell Public House	II	High Street	pub		21 December 1967	TL6747430450; 51°56′50″N 0°26′07″E		1337791	The Bell Public House More images	Q26622169
The Corn Dolly Restaurant Walnut Tree House	II	High Street			21 December 1967	TL6751330529; 51°56′53″N 0°26′09″E		1123476	Upload Photo	Q26416568
The Golden Sovereign the Old Police House	II	High Street			21 December 1967	TL6750330524; 51°56′53″N 0°26′09″E		1104868	Upload Photo	Q26398834
The Post Office	II	High Street			21 December 1967	TL6748930507; 51°56′52″N 0°26′08″E		1104860	Upload Photo	Q26398826
Town House	II	High Street			2 May 1953	TL6746530480; 51°56′51″N 0°26′07″E		1104891	Upload Photo	Q26398853
Town House Cottages	II	High Street			21 December 1967	TL6747330489; 51°56′52″N 0°26′07″E		1123474	Upload Photo	Q26416566
Trinity Cottage	II	High Street			21 December 1967	TL6750230485; 51°56′52″N 0°26′09″E		1123480	Upload Photo	Q26416571
Gibraltar Mill	II	Mill Road	tower mill		21 December 1967	TL6800430727; 51°56′59″N 0°26′35″E		1106360	Gibraltar Mill More images	Q5559174
Great Bardfield Watermill and Bridge	II	Mill Road, CM7 4QG	watermill		21 December 1967	TL6800331149; 51°57′12″N 0°26′36″E		1337813	Great Bardfield Watermill and Bridge More images	Q17557851
Stable Block Approximately 30 Metres South East of Great Bardfield Watermill	II	Mill Road			17 May 1985	TL6801631110; 51°57′11″N 0°26′37″E		1123442	Upload Photo	Q26416540
The Mill House	II	Mill Road			21 December 1967	TL6799531136; 51°57′12″N 0°26′36″E		1106335	Upload Photo	Q26400205
Vine Cottage	II	2, Vine Street			21 December 1967	TL6759930624; 51°56′56″N 0°26′14″E		1123443	Upload Photo	Q26416541
Ancillary Building Approximately 25 Metres North the Vine Public House	II	Vine Street			17 May 1985	TL6754030606; 51°56′55″N 0°26′11″E		1106348	Upload Photo	Q26400217
Buck's House	II	Vine Street			17 May 1985	TL6757530564; 51°56′54″N 0°26′13″E		1337815	Upload Photo	Q26622186
Dixon House	II	Vine Street			17 May 1985	TL6756830583; 51°56′55″N 0°26′12″E		1123444	Upload Photo	Q26416542
Hill Cottage	II	Vine Street			17 May 1985	TL6757230588; 51°56′55″N 0°26′13″E		1106322	Upload Photo	Q26400196
Stubbards	II	Vine Street			21 December 1967	TL6757930596; 51°56′55″N 0°26′13″E		1337814	Upload Photo	Q26622185
The Gables	II	Vine Street			21 December 1967	TL6758530606; 51°56′55″N 0°26′13″E		1325945	Upload Photo	Q26611463
Barn Approximately 30 Metres South East of Cross Farmhouse	II	Walthams Cross			17 May 1985	TL6950230464; 51°56′49″N 0°27′53″E		1106291	Upload Photo	Q26400168
Chief's Farmhouse	II	Walthams Cross			17 May 1985	TL6945030576; 51°56′52″N 0°27′51″E		1106281	Upload Photo	Q26400158
Cross Farmhouse	II	Walthams Cross			21 December 1967	TL6948030506; 51°56′50″N 0°27′52″E		1123446	Upload Photo	Q26416543
Vine Cottage	II	Walthams Cross			17 May 1985	TL6926430566; 51°56′52″N 0°27′41″E		1106273	Upload Photo	Q26400149
Claypit Hall Farmhouse	II	Wethersfield Road			17 May 1985	TL6830030655; 51°56′56″N 0°26′51″E		1337816	Upload Photo	Q26622187
Orger's Farmhouse	II	Wethersfield Road			17 May 1985	TL6914230572; 51°56′53″N 0°27′35″E		1107211	Upload Photo	Q26401023

== See also ==
- Grade I listed buildings in Essex
- Grade II* listed buildings in Essex

== Sources ==
- Bettley, James; Pevsner, Nikolaus (2007) [1954], Essex, The Buildings of England, New Haven and London: Yale University Press, ISBN 978-0-300-11614-4
