= Listed buildings in Steeple Bumpstead =

Civil Parish in Essex, England

Steeple Bumpstead is a village and civil parish in the Braintree District of Essex, England. It contains 52 listed buildings that are recorded in the National Heritage List for England. Of these two are grade I, five are grade II* and 45 are grade II.

This list is based on the information retrieved online from Historic England.

== Key ==
Grade	Criteria
I	Buildings that are of exceptional interest
II*	Particularly important buildings of more than special interest
II	Buildings that are of special interest

== Listing ==
Name	Grade	Location	Type	Completed (Note: The date given is the date used by Historic England as significant for the initial building or that of an important part in the structure's description.)	Date designated	Grid ref. (Note: The grid reference is based on the British national grid reference system, sometimes known as OSGB36, used by the Ordnance Survey.) Geo-coordinates	Notes	Entry number (Note: The "List Entry Number" is a unique number assigned to each listed building and scheduled monument by Historic England.)	Image	Wikidata
Granary Approximately 6 Metres East South East of Smiths Green Farmhouse	II				16 May 1984	TL6695540171; 52°02′05″N 0°25′57″E		1122300	Upload Photo	Q26415448
Barn Approximately 10 Metres South West of Smiths Green Farmhouse	II				16 May 1984	TL6692440161; 52°02′05″N 0°25′55″E		1338364	Upload Photo	Q26622693
Bridge Approximately 10 Metres South of Latchleys Farmhouse	II				21 June 1962	TL6712239574; 52°01′46″N 0°26′05″E		1122297	Upload Photo	Q26415445
Gate Piers Approximately 20 Metres North West of Moyns Park	II				16 May 1984	TL6941040653; 52°02′18″N 0°28′07″E		1166085	Upload Photo	Q26459544
Barn Approximately 30 Metres North of Yew Tree Farmhouse	II				16 May 1984	TL6907042240; 52°03′10″N 0°27′52″E		1122303	Upload Photo	Q26415452
Barn Approximately 30 Metres South South East of Latchleys Farmhouse	II				16 May 1984	TL6714039537; 52°01′45″N 0°26′06″E		1309106	Upload Photo	Q26595637
Barn and Farm Complex of Old Hall Farm	II				16 May 1984	TL6882640096; 52°02′01″N 0°27′35″E		1122299	Upload Photo	Q26415447
Cootes Farmhouse	II				7 August 1952	TL6916839995; 52°01′57″N 0°27′53″E		1122294	Upload Photo	Q26415441
Great Waltons Farmhouse	II				16 May 1984	TL6969642804; 52°03′27″N 0°28′26″E		1338360	Upload Photo	Q26622691
Herkstead Green Cottage	II				16 May 1984	TL6756138342; 52°01′06″N 0°26′26″E		1122295	Upload Photo	Q26415443
Herkstead Green Farmhouse	II				25 March 1980	TL6745838344; 52°01′06″N 0°26′20″E		1338361	Upload Photo	Q26622692
High Folly	II				16 May 1984	TL6837338182; 52°00′59″N 0°27′08″E		1122296	Upload Photo	Q26415444
Latchleys Farmhouse	II*		farmhouse		7 August 1952	TL6712439598; 52°01′47″N 0°26′05″E		1338362	Latchleys Farmhouse More images	Q17544875
Little Smiths Green Farmhouse	II				16 May 1984	TL6689940114; 52°02′04″N 0°25′54″E		1122298	Upload Photo	Q26415446
Lower House Farmhouse	II				7 August 1952	TL6862141950; 52°03′01″N 0°27′28″E		1309111	Upload Photo	Q26595642
Moyns Park	I		English country house		7 August 1952	TL6943840621; 52°02′17″N 0°28′08″E		1338363	Moyns Park More images	Q6927736
Old Hall Farmhouse	II				16 May 1984	TL6890240066; 52°02′00″N 0°27′39″E		1166101	Upload Photo	Q26459558
Smiths Green Farmhouse	II				16 May 1984	TL6694040175; 52°02′05″N 0°25′56″E		1166113	Upload Photo	Q26459570
South Lodge of Moyns Park	II				16 May 1984	TL6917240125; 52°02′01″N 0°27′53″E		1122301	Upload Photo	Q26415450
Steeple Bumpstead War Memorial	II		war memorial		17 January 2018	TL6801441037; 52°02′32″N 0°26′54″E		1452736	Steeple Bumpstead War Memorial More images	Q66479316
Upper House Farmhouse	II				21 June 1962	TL6949342606; 52°03′21″N 0°28′15″E		1166126	Upload Photo	Q26459581
Wakelands Farmhouse	II				16 May 1984	TL6818439187; 52°01′32″N 0°27′00″E		1122302	Upload Photo	Q26415451
Yew Tree Farmhouse	II				16 May 1984	TL6908242200; 52°03′09″N 0°27′52″E		1166143	Upload Photo	Q26459597
Barn Approximately 20 Metres West North West of Blois Farmhouse	II	Blois Road			21 June 1962	TL6847341579; 52°02′49″N 0°27′19″E		1122305	Upload Photo	Q26415455
Blois Farmhouse	II	Blois Road			21 June 1962	TL6850741570; 52°02′49″N 0°27′21″E		1166165	Upload Photo	Q26459617
Broad Green Farmhouse	II	Blois Road			21 June 1962	TL6942041865; 52°02′57″N 0°28′09″E		1122306	Upload Photo	Q26415456
Dovehouse Approximately 7 Metres South East of Blois Farmhouse	II	Blois Road			16 May 1984	TL6853241566; 52°02′49″N 0°27′22″E		1122304	Upload Photo	Q17905095
Rylands Farmhouse	II	Blois Road			16 May 1984	TL6968942031; 52°03′02″N 0°28′24″E		1166174	Upload Photo	Q26459625
Rose Cottage	II	17, Chapel Street			16 May 1984	TL6804441182; 52°02′37″N 0°26′56″E		1166192	Upload Photo	Q26459639
Portobello Cottage	II	Chapel Street			21 June 1962	TL6806541111; 52°02′35″N 0°26′57″E		1166217	Upload Photo	Q26459682
Portobello House	II	Chapel Street			21 June 1962	TL6806041094; 52°02′34″N 0°26′57″E		1338365	Upload Photo	Q26622694
The Ancient House	II*	Chapel Street			21 June 1962	TL6808941129; 52°02′35″N 0°26′58″E		1122307	Upload Photo	Q17557087
The Fox and Hounds Public House	II	Chapel Street	pub		16 May 1984	TL6800641068; 52°02′33″N 0°26′54″E		1166229	The Fox and Hounds Public House More images	Q26459710
Broadgate House	II	Church Street			16 May 1984	TL6783941053; 52°02′33″N 0°26′45″E		1308953	Upload Photo	Q26595500
Lock Up Approximately 30 Metres North West of Parish Church	II	Church Street			16 May 1984	TL6790841088; 52°02′34″N 0°26′49″E		1122309	Upload Photo	Q26415458
Monument to Johanah Swan Approximately 5 Metres South of the Chancel of the Parish Church	II	Church Street			16 May 1984	TL6792041058; 52°02′33″N 0°26′49″E		1122310	Upload Photo	Q26415459
Parish Church of St Mary the Virgin	I	Church Street	church building		21 June 1962	TL6790241055; 52°02′33″N 0°26′48″E		1166315	Parish Church of St Mary the Virgin More images	Q17536032
Retaining Wall on North Side of Churchyard	II	Church Street			16 May 1984	TL6793941075; 52°02′33″N 0°26′50″E		1338366	Upload Photo	Q26622695
Telephone Kiosk	II	Church Street			24 February 1988	TL6794341084; 52°02′34″N 0°26′51″E		1221755	Upload Photo	Q26516130
The Gun House	II*	Church Street			7 August 1952	TL6795641029; 52°02′32″N 0°26′51″E		1122308	Upload Photo	Q17557091
The Manor House the Post Office	II	Church Street			21 June 1962	TL6793941100; 52°02′34″N 0°26′50″E		1338367	Upload Photo	Q26622696
The Moot Hall	II*	Church Street	market hall		7 August 1952	TL6801741052; 52°02′33″N 0°26′54″E		1146551	The Moot Hall More images	Q17557476
The Red Lion Public House	II	Church Street	pub		16 May 1984	TL6796841088; 52°02′34″N 0°26′52″E		1308926	The Red Lion Public House More images	Q26595477
Victoria Cottage	II	Church Street			16 May 1984	TL6797241074; 52°02′33″N 0°26′52″E		1122311	Upload Photo	Q26415460
Clay Wall House	II	Clay Wall Bridge			21 June 1962	TL6802741328; 52°02′42″N 0°26′55″E		1338368	Upload Photo	Q26622697
Barn Approximately 60 Metres East South East of Martin's Farmhouse	II	Eggshell Lane			16 May 1984	TL6868538366; 52°01′05″N 0°27′25″E		1122312	Upload Photo	Q26415461
Mill Farmhouse	II	Mill Chase			16 May 1984	TL6803640017; 52°01′59″N 0°26′54″E		1338388	Upload Photo	Q26622715
Freezes Farmhouse	II	North Street			21 June 1962	TL6777841150; 52°02′36″N 0°26′42″E		1122271	Upload Photo	Q26415415
Brick House	II*	The Endway			7 August 1952	TL6820441648; 52°02′52″N 0°27′05″E		1338387	Upload Photo	Q17544886
Pump Approximately 3 Metres East of Brick House	II	The Endway			16 May 1984	TL6821741648; 52°02′52″N 0°27′06″E		1122270	Upload Photo	Q26415413
The Thatched Cottage	II	17, Water Lane			16 May 1984	TL6768940964; 52°02′30″N 0°26′37″E		1338389	Upload Photo	Q26622716
Tanyard	II	Water Lane			16 May 1984	TL6772241025; 52°02′32″N 0°26′39″E		1122272	Upload Photo	Q26415416

== See also ==
- Grade I listed buildings in Essex
- Grade II* listed buildings in Essex

== Sources ==
- Bettley, James; Pevsner, Nikolaus (2007) [1954], Essex, The Buildings of England, New Haven and London: Yale University Press, ISBN 978-0-300-11614-4
