= Listed buildings in Hatfield Peverel =

Historic structures in Essex, England

Hatfield Peverel is a village and civil parish in the Braintree District of Essex, England. It contains 47 listed buildings that are recorded in the National Heritage List for England. Of these two are grade II* and 42 are grade II.

This list is based on the information retrieved online from Historic England.

== Key ==
Grade	Criteria
I	Buildings that are of exceptional interest
II*	Particularly important buildings of more than special interest
II	Buildings that are of special interest

== Listing ==
Name	Grade	Location	Type	Completed (Note: The date given is the date used by Historic England as significant for the initial building or that of an important part in the structure's description.)	Date designated	Grid ref. (Note: The grid reference is based on the British national grid reference system, sometimes known as OSGB36, used by the Ordnance Survey.) Geo-coordinates	Notes	Entry number (Note: The "List Entry Number" is a unique number assigned to each listed building and scheduled monument by Historic England.)	Image	Wikidata
Barn of Knowles Farm	II				13 March 1986	TL8125611898; 51°46′35″N 0°37′33″E		1123425	Upload Photo	Q26416523
Rainbirds	II				13 March 1986	TL7765509154; 51°45′10″N 0°34′21″E		1337805	Upload Photo	Q26622180
Priory Lodge	II	1 and 2, Church Road			13 March 1986	TL7976111159; 51°46′13″N 0°36′14″E		1337807	Upload Photo	Q26622181
Parish Church of St Andrew	II*	Church Road	church building		13 March 1986	TL7970111017; 51°46′08″N 0°36′11″E		1308736	Parish Church of St Andrew More images	Q17557773
Shepherds Cottage	II	Church Road			16 October 1981	TL7925911222; 51°46′15″N 0°35′48″E		1123426	Upload Photo	Q26416524
The Priory	II*	Church Road			18 May 1978	TL7962910854; 51°46′03″N 0°36′07″E		1308731	Upload Photo	Q17557768
Wall North East and South of the Vicarage	II	Church Road			13 March 1986	TL7973410982; 51°46′07″N 0°36′12″E		1123427	Upload Photo	Q26416525
Salvador, Hooks and Sheaves	II	Hooks And Sheaves, The Street			13 March 1986	TL7938011886; 51°46′37″N 0°35′56″E		1337811	Upload Photo	Q26622183
Crix House	II	London Road			13 March 1986	TL7798111241; 51°46′18″N 0°34′41″E		1147072	Upload Photo	Q26440154
Hatfield Place	II*	London Road			13 March 1986	TL7852411443; 51°46′23″N 0°35′10″E		1337808	Upload Photo	Q17557845
Little Crix	II	London Road			13 March 1986	TL7768411102; 51°46′13″N 0°34′26″E		1123429	Upload Photo	Q26416527
Lovibond Cottages	II	1-4, Maldon Road			13 March 1986	TL7981311487; 51°46′23″N 0°36′17″E		1147097	Upload Photo	Q26440179
White Hart Cottage	II	Maldon Road			13 March 1986	TL7943311835; 51°46′35″N 0°35′58″E		1123430	Upload Photo	Q26416528
Barn Approximately 50 Metres West South West of Botters Farmhouse	II	Mowden Hall Lane			13 March 1986	TL7836009649; 51°45′26″N 0°34′58″E		1308681	Upload Photo	Q26595257
Gardeners Farmhouse	II	Mowden Hall Lane			13 March 1986	TL7875509803; 51°45′30″N 0°35′19″E		1337809	Upload Photo	Q26622182
Barns and Gate Farmhouse	II	Nounsley Road			25 March 1980	TL7982310326; 51°45′46″N 0°36′16″E		1308645	Upload Photo	Q26595225
Bridge Farmhouse	II	Nounsley Road			13 March 1986	TL7946910281; 51°45′45″N 0°35′57″E		1123431	Upload Photo	Q26416529
28, Sportmans Lane	II	28, Sportmans Lane			13 March 1986	TL7959510566; 51°45′54″N 0°36′04″E		1123432	Upload Photo	Q26416530
White Gates	II	41, Sportmans Lane, Nounsley			13 March 1986	TL7961810492; 51°45′51″N 0°36′05″E		1147126	Upload Photo	Q26440205
Barn Approximately 15 Metres West of Priory Farmhouse	II	Sportmans Lane, Nounsley			13 March 1986	TL7977310426; 51°45′49″N 0°36′13″E		1123433	Upload Photo	Q26416531
Byre and Shed Approximately 25 Metres South West of Priory Farmhouse	II	Sportmans Lane, Nounsley			13 March 1986	TL7977710417; 51°45′49″N 0°36′14″E		1147125	Upload Photo	Q26440204
Lightfoots	II	Sportmans Lane, Nounsley			13 March 1986	TL7957010542; 51°45′53″N 0°36′03″E		1123434	Upload Photo	Q26416532
Priory Farmhouse	II	Sportmans Lane, Nounsley			13 March 1986	TL7980210427; 51°45′49″N 0°36′15″E		1147123	Upload Photo	Q26440202
Barn Approximately 10 Metres North East of Hatfield Wick Farmhouse	II	Terling Hall Road			13 March 1986	TL7788912227; 51°46′50″N 0°34′38″E		1147194	Upload Photo	Q26440268
Barn Approximately 40 Metres North East of Whitelands Farmhouse	II	Terling Hall Road			13 March 1986	TL7840613630; 51°47′34″N 0°35′08″E		1147205	Upload Photo	Q26440277
Barn Approximately 40 Metres West North West of Termitts Farmhouse	II	Terling Hall Road			13 March 1986	TL7898113361; 51°47′25″N 0°35′38″E		1123404	Upload Photo	Q26416506
Barn Approximately 60 Metres North North East of Hatfield Wick Farmhouse	II	Terling Hall Road			13 March 1986	TL7789512274; 51°46′51″N 0°34′39″E		1277752	Upload Photo	Q26567146
Berwick Farmhouse	II	Terling Hall Road			18 March 1985	TL7782211768; 51°46′35″N 0°34′34″E		1123441	Upload Photo	Q26416539
Garden Wall (part Incorporated in A Garage) Approximately 30 Metres South West of Toppinghoe Hall	II	Terling Hall Road			13 March 1986	TL7728811523; 51°46′27″N 0°34′06″E		1308640	Upload Photo	Q26595222
Hatfield Wick Farmhouse	II	Terling Hall Road			13 March 1986	TL7787212208; 51°46′49″N 0°34′38″E		1337812	Upload Photo	Q26622184
Part of Former House and Attached Garden Wall Approximatley 15 Metres South of Toppinghoe Hall	II	Terling Hall Road			2 May 1953	TL7729811539; 51°46′28″N 0°34′06″E		1123440	Upload Photo	Q26416538
Toppinghoe Hall	II	Terling Hall Road			2 May 1953	TL7731211565; 51°46′29″N 0°34′07″E		1147178	Upload Photo	Q26440252
Termitts Farmhouse	II*	Terling Road			7 May 1976	TL7903513349; 51°47′25″N 0°35′40″E		1123403	Upload Photo	Q17557315
Ann Cottage and Grange Cottage	II	The Green			13 March 1986	TL7990811401; 51°46′21″N 0°36′22″E		1123428	Upload Photo	Q26416526
Brewery House	II	The Green			13 March 1986	TL7994411333; 51°46′18″N 0°36′24″E		1308698	Upload Photo	Q26595273
Numbers 1 and 2, the Limes	II	The Limes, The Street			13 March 1986	TL7906811771; 51°46′33″N 0°35′39″E		1147133	Upload Photo	Q26440211
12 and 14, the Street	II	12 and 14, The Street			13 March 1986	TL7876611635; 51°46′29″N 0°35′23″E		1123435	Upload Photo	Q26416533
Fir Tree Cottages	II	The Street			17 June 1985	TL7887711689; 51°46′31″N 0°35′29″E		1123436	Upload Photo	Q26416534
Hill House	II	The Street			27 May 1980	TL7881011619; 51°46′29″N 0°35′25″E		1123438	Upload Photo	Q26416536
Peppercorn	II	The Street			13 March 1986	TL7909211781; 51°46′34″N 0°35′40″E		1123437	Upload Photo	Q26416535
Post Office Stores	II	The Street			13 March 1986	TL7883011661; 51°46′30″N 0°35′26″E		1147129	Upload Photo	Q26440207
Stables Approximately 10 Metres to North East of Hill House	II	The Street			27 May 1980	TL7882511636; 51°46′29″N 0°35′26″E		1147153	Upload Photo	Q26440231
The Bakery and Unnamed House Adjoining to the East	II	The Street			13 March 1986	TL7936611925; 51°46′38″N 0°35′55″E		1147142	Upload Photo	Q26440220
The Crown Public House	II*	The Street			13 March 1986	TL7873811604; 51°46′28″N 0°35′22″E		1337810	The Crown Public House More images	Q17557848
Vinehurst	II	The Street			16 October 1981	TL7883411643; 51°46′30″N 0°35′27″E		1308627	Upload Photo	Q26595209
Wall Approximately 12 Metres North West of Hill House	II	The Street			27 May 1980	TL7878611628; 51°46′29″N 0°35′24″E		1123439	Upload Photo	Q26416537
Thatched Cottage	II	Ulting Road			13 March 1986	TL8002611116; 51°46′11″N 0°36′28″E		1337834	Upload Photo	Q26622202

== See also ==
- Grade I listed buildings in Essex
- Grade II* listed buildings in Essex

== Sources ==
- Bettley, James; Pevsner, Nikolaus (2007) [1954], Essex, The Buildings of England, New Haven and London: Yale University Press, ISBN 978-0-300-11614-4
