= Listed buildings in Belchamp St Paul =

Civil Parish in Essex, England

Belchamp St Paul is a village and civil parish in the Braintree District of Essex, England. It contains 49 listed buildings that are recorded in the National Heritage List for England. Of these two are grade I and 47 are grade II.

This list is based on the information retrieved online from Historic England.

== Key ==
Grade	Criteria
I	Buildings that are of exceptional interest
II*	Particularly important buildings of more than special interest
II	Buildings that are of special interest

== Listing ==
Name	Grade	Location	Type	Completed (Note: The date given is the date used by Historic England as significant for the initial building or that of an important part in the structure's description.)	Date designated	Grid ref. (Note: The grid reference is based on the British national grid reference system, sometimes known as OSGB36, used by the Ordnance Survey.) Geo-coordinates	Notes	Entry number (Note: The "List Entry Number" is a unique number assigned to each listed building and scheduled monument by Historic England.)	Image	Wikidata
Barn Approximately 70 Metres North of Cutbush Farmhouse	II	Bakers Road			17 May 1984	TL7753842640; 52°03′13″N 0°35′17″E		1122390	Upload Photo	Q26415544
Barn to Rear and Approximately 50 Metres North of Pannells	II	Bakers Road			17 May 1984	TL7915242446; 52°03′05″N 0°36′41″E		1166364	Upload Photo	Q26459849
Cutbush Farmhouse	II	Bakers Road			17 May 1984	TL7756142625; 52°03′13″N 0°35′18″E		1166321	Upload Photo	Q26459803
Four Cottages Approximately 25 Metres South West of Lovelands Farmhouse	II	Bakers Road			17 May 1984	TL7854642534; 52°03′09″N 0°36′09″E		1166334	Upload Photo	Q26459820
K6 Telephone Kiosk Bakers Road Cole Green	II	Bakers Road, Cole Green			21 April 1988	TL7919742328; 52°03′01″N 0°36′43″E		1276909	Upload Photo	Q26566382
Lovelands Farmhouse	II	Bakers Road			17 May 1984	TL7870942550; 52°03′09″N 0°36′18″E		1122391	Upload Photo	Q26415545
Lymburners	II	Bakers Road			7 August 1952	TL7917642411; 52°03′04″N 0°36′42″E		1122393	Upload Photo	Q26415547
Outbuildings Approximately 7 Metres to Rear and North of Pannells	II	Bakers Road			17 May 1984	TL7915242418; 52°03′04″N 0°36′41″E		1122392	Upload Photo	Q26415546
Pannells	II	Bakers Road			21 June 1962	TL7914842405; 52°03′04″N 0°36′41″E		1308954	Upload Photo	Q26595501
Cartshed with Loft Over Approximately 40 Metres South East of Hole Farmhouse	II	Belchamp St. Paul			17 May 1984	TL7827241396; 52°02′32″N 0°35′53″E		1122364	Upload Photo	Q26415518
Hole Farmhouse	II	Belchamp St. Paul, Knowle Green			17 May 1984	TL7824941433; 52°02′33″N 0°35′52″E		1338355	Upload Photo	Q26622686
Knowles Cottage South of Cherry Tree Inn	II	Belchamp St. Paul, Knowle Green			17 May 1984	TL7839241359; 52°02′31″N 0°35′59″E		1122363	Upload Photo	Q26415517
Old Pastures	II	Belchamp St. Paul, Knowle Green			17 May 1984	TL7835941409; 52°02′33″N 0°35′57″E		1146768	Upload Photo	Q26439875
Stone Cottages	II	Belchamp St. Paul, Knowle Green			17 May 1984	TL7798041272; 52°02′29″N 0°35′37″E		1338354	Upload Photo	Q26622685
The Cherry Tree Inn	II	Belchamp St. Paul, Knowle Green			17 May 1984	TL7841141377; 52°02′31″N 0°36′00″E		1146753	Upload Photo	Q26439861
Woodbarn's Farmhouse	II	Belchamp St. Paul, Knowle Green			17 May 1984	TL7823341258; 52°02′28″N 0°35′50″E		1308827	Upload Photo	Q26595388
5-6 Church Street	II	5-6, Church Street, CO10 7DJ			17 May 1984	TL7988443231; 52°03′30″N 0°37′21″E		1338329	Upload Photo	Q26622663
7 and 8, Church Street	II	7 and 8, Church Street			17 May 1984	TL7988543192; 52°03′28″N 0°37′21″E		1146612	Upload Photo	Q26439733
Barn Approximately 50 Metres South West of Paul's Hall	I	Church Street			17 May 1984	TL7972643407; 52°03′36″N 0°37′13″E		1122396	Upload Photo	Q17535784
Barn Approximately 75 Metres North West of Browns Farmhouse	II	Church Street			17 May 1984	TL7982642938; 52°03′20″N 0°37′17″E		1338330	Upload Photo	Q26622664
Browns Farmhouse	II	Church Street			17 May 1984	TL7980342895; 52°03′19″N 0°37′16″E		1146617	Upload Photo	Q26439737
Church of St Andrew	I	Church Street	church building		21 June 1962	TL7983343460; 52°03′37″N 0°37′18″E		1166368	Church of St Andrew More images	Q17536054
Paul's Hall	II	Church Street			7 August 1952	TL7975443464; 52°03′37″N 0°37′14″E		1146560	Upload Photo	Q26439681
Stable Approximately 20 Metres West of Paul's Hall	II	Church Street			17 May 1984	TL7971143455; 52°03′37″N 0°37′12″E		1146604	Upload Photo	Q26439724
Turners	II	Church Street			17 May 1984	TL7992243130; 52°03′26″N 0°37′23″E		1122397	Upload Photo	Q26415550
Two Tombstones at Church of St Andrew 1 3 Metres North of North Vestry to Mary Ewer 1830 and Jonn Ewer 1844 2 6 Metres North of North Vestry to Thomas Shepherd Ewer 1856 and Emma Elizabeth Ewer 1852	II	Church Street			17 May 1984	TL7984343473; 52°03′38″N 0°37′19″E		1122394	Upload Photo	Q26415548
Wall Enclosing Churchyard and the Front of Paul's Hall	II	Church Street			17 May 1984	TL7979243435; 52°03′36″N 0°37′16″E		1122395	Upload Photo	Q26415549
Chestnut Place	II	2 and 3, Gages Road			17 May 1984	TL7910942216; 52°02′58″N 0°36′38″E		1122358	Upload Photo	Q26415511
Amos's Cottage to Left and North of the Half Moon	II	Gages Road			17 May 1984	TL7920642317; 52°03′01″N 0°36′43″E		1338350	Upload Photo	Q26622681
Flint Wall to Left and Front of Gage's House	II	Gages Road			17 May 1984	TL7870441783; 52°02′44″N 0°36′16″E		1122398	Upload Photo	Q26415551
Gage's Cottage	II	Gages Road			17 May 1984	TL7882741953; 52°02′50″N 0°36′23″E		1146643	Upload Photo	Q26439757
Gage's House	II	Gages Road			7 August 1952	TL7868841803; 52°02′45″N 0°36′15″E		1146626	Upload Photo	Q26439744
Glebe Cottage	II	Gages Road			17 May 1984	TL7911342303; 52°03′01″N 0°36′39″E		1122399	Upload Photo	Q26415552
Lantern Cottage	II	Gages Road			17 May 1984	TL7912642369; 52°03′03″N 0°36′39″E		1308868	Upload Photo	Q26595425
Plough Cottage	II	Gages Road			17 May 1984	TL7903242144; 52°02′56″N 0°36′34″E		1122359	Upload Photo	Q26415512
St Pauls Place	II	Gages Road			17 May 1984	TL7887442010; 52°02′51″N 0°36′25″E		1338331	Upload Photo	Q26622665
The Half Moon	II	Gages Road	thatched pub		17 May 1984	TL7919042294; 52°03′00″N 0°36′43″E		1122357	The Half Moon More images	Q26415509
The Rosary	II	Gages Road			17 May 1984	TL7914142255; 52°02′59″N 0°36′40″E		1338351	Upload Photo	Q26622682
Barn to Left Approximately 60 Metres West of Clare Down Farmhouse	II	Hickford Hill Road			17 May 1984	TL7773644534; 52°04′14″N 0°35′31″E		1146715	Upload Photo	Q26439823
Claredon Farmhouse	II	Hickford Hill Road			7 August 1952	TL7768344532; 52°04′14″N 0°35′28″E		1338353	Upload Photo	Q26622684
Outbuilding and Adjoining Rear of Claredown Farmhouse	II	Hickford Hill Road			7 August 1952	TL7768144522; 52°04′14″N 0°35′28″E		1122362	Upload Photo	Q26415516
Shearing Place	II	Hickford Hill Road			21 June 1962	TL7905844217; 52°04′03″N 0°36′39″E		1338352	Upload Photo	Q26622683
Stables in Front of and Approximately 35 Metres North of Claredown Farmhouse	II	Hickford Hill Road			7 August 1952	TL7769644557; 52°04′15″N 0°35′28″E		1122361	Upload Photo	Q26415514
Wall Enclosing Front Garden to Shearing Place	II	Hickford Hill Road			17 May 1984	TL7907044196; 52°04′02″N 0°36′40″E		1122360	Upload Photo	Q26415513
Mulberry House	II	Vicarage Road			17 May 1984	TL7931342414; 52°03′04″N 0°36′49″E		1338316	Upload Photo	Q26622651
New Hall	II	Vicarage Road			17 May 1984	TL7946442420; 52°03′04″N 0°36′57″E		1122365	Upload Photo	Q26415519
Wall Approximately 6 Metres North of Mulberry House	II	Vicarage Road			17 May 1984	TL7930742444; 52°03′05″N 0°36′49″E		1308817	Upload Photo	Q26595378
Barn and Attached Cartlodge Approximately 50 Metres West of Wakeshall Farmhouse	II	Wakeshall Lane			17 May 1984	TL7733741452; 52°02′35″N 0°35′04″E		1122366	Upload Photo	Q26415520
Wakeshall Farmhouse	II	Wakeshall Lane			17 May 1984	TL7739241446; 52°02′35″N 0°35′07″E		1308788	Upload Photo	Q26595352

== See also ==
- Grade I listed buildings in Essex
- Grade II* listed buildings in Essex

== Sources ==
- Bettley, James; Pevsner, Nikolaus (2007) [1954], Essex, The Buildings of England, New Haven and London: Yale University Press, ISBN 978-0-300-11614-4
