= Listed buildings in Great Maplestead =

Historic structures in Essex, England

Great Maplestead is a village and civil parish in the Braintree District of Essex, England. It contains 53 listed buildings that are recorded in the National Heritage List for England. Of these one is grade I, one is grade II* and 51 are grade II.

This list is based on the information retrieved online from Historic England.

== Key ==
| Grade | Criteria |
|---|---|
| I | Buildings that are of exceptional interest |
| II* | Particularly important buildings of more than special interest |
| II | Buildings that are of special interest |

== Listing ==
| Name | Grade | Location | Type | Completed (Note: The date given is the date used by Historic England as significant for the initial building or that of an important part in the structure's description.) | Date designated | Grid ref. (Note: The grid reference is based on the British national grid reference system, sometimes known as OSGB36, used by the Ordnance Survey.) Geo-coordinates | Notes | Entry number (Note: The "List Entry Number" is a unique number assigned to each listed building and scheduled monument by Historic England.) | Image | Wikidata |
|---|---|---|---|---|---|---|---|---|---|---|
| New Barn Barn Approximately 40 Metres North of House | II | | | | 19 July 1984 | TL8090335546; 51°59′20″N 0°38′00″E | | 1123082 | Upload Photo | Q26416177 |
| Former Coach House to the Vicarage | II | | | | 20 July 1995 | TL8085334682; 51°58′52″N 0°37′55″E | | 1233875 | Upload Photo | Q26527314 |
| Parsonage House | II | | | | 20 July 1995 | TL8085334658; 51°58′51″N 0°37′55″E | | 1276392 | Upload Photo | Q26565908 |
| St Giles Church of England School | II | | | | 20 July 1995 | TL8080534700; 51°58′53″N 0°37′53″E | | 1233869 | Upload Photo | Q26527308 |
| Chelmshoe House | II | Castle Hedingham Road | | | 7 August 1952 | TL8042035248; 51°59′11″N 0°37′34″E | | 1168268 | Upload Photo | Q26461532 |
| Chelmshoe House Barn Approximately 100 Metres North West of House | II | Castle Hedingham Road | | | 19 July 1984 | TL8038635296; 51°59′13″N 0°37′32″E | | 1168280 | Upload Photo | Q26461543 |
| Chelmshoe House Dovecote Approximately 110 Metres North East of House | II | Castle Hedingham Road | | | 7 August 1952 | TL8051035315; 51°59′13″N 0°37′39″E | | 1123083 | Upload Photo | Q26416178 |
| Church of St Giles | I | Church Street | church building | | 21 June 1962 | TL8081734570; 51°58′49″N 0°37′53″E | | 1337989 | Church of St Giles More images | Q17536266 |
| Ivy Cottage | II | Church Street | | | 19 July 1984 | TL8070134346; 51°58′41″N 0°37′47″E | | 1123084 | Upload Photo | Q26416179 |
| Old Timbers | II | Church Street | | | 21 June 1962 | TL8069534472; 51°58′46″N 0°37′47″E | | 1168311 | Upload Photo | Q26461571 |
| September Cottage | II | Church Street | | | 19 July 1984 | TL8070834258; 51°58′39″N 0°37′47″E | | 1337990 | Upload Photo | Q26622342 |
| Walnut Tree Cottage | II | Church Street | | | 19 July 1984 | TL8070534283; 51°58′39″N 0°37′47″E | | 1307074 | Upload Photo | Q26593781 |
| Dyne's Hall Bathing Hut by Lake Approximately 100 Metres West of Hall | II | Dyne's Hall Road | | | 19 July 1984 | TL8066933046; 51°57′59″N 0°37′43″E | | 1337991 | Upload Photo | Q26622343 |
| Dyne's Hall | II* | Dynes Hall Road | architectural structure | | 7 August 1952 | TL8055433070; 51°58′00″N 0°37′37″E | | 1168338 | Dyne's Hall More images | Q17557509 |
| Dyne's Hall Garden Terrace Wall Approximately 50 Metres South East of Hall | II | Dynes Hall Road | | | 19 July 1984 | TL8057533019; 51°57′59″N 0°37′38″E | | 1168345 | Upload Photo | Q26461604 |
| Dyne's Hall House Immediately North West of Hall | II | Dynes Hall Road | | | 19 July 1984 | TL8055633087; 51°58′01″N 0°37′37″E | | 1123085 | Upload Photo | Q26416181 |
| Dyne's Hall Stables Approximately 15 Metres West of Hall | II | Dynes Hall Road | | | 21 June 1962 | TL8053033094; 51°58′01″N 0°37′35″E | | 1123086 | Upload Photo | Q26416182 |
| Byham Hall | II | Gestingthorpe Road | | | 7 August 1952 | TL8191135576; 51°59′20″N 0°38′52″E | | 1307050 | Upload Photo | Q26593761 |
| Byham Hall Barn Approximately 40 Metres North East of Hall | II | Gestingthorpe Road | | | 19 July 1984 | TL8193335602; 51°59′21″N 0°38′54″E | | 1123087 | Upload Photo | Q26416183 |
| Byham Hall Barn Approximately 70 Metres North East of Hall | II | Gestingthorpe Road | | | 19 July 1984 | TL8197035592; 51°59′20″N 0°38′56″E | | 1233822 | Upload Photo | Q26527265 |
| Little Chelmshoe House Outbuilding Approximately 14 Metres South East of House | II | Great Maplestead Road | | | 19 July 1984 | TL8118335848; 51°59′29″N 0°38′15″E | | 1147424 | Upload Photo | Q26440458 |
| Hull's Mill | II | Hull's Mill Road, Sible Hedingham | | | 15 October 1984 | TL7928833173; 51°58′05″N 0°36′31″E | | 1122860 | Upload Photo | Q26415969 |
| Hulls Mill House | II | Hulls Mill Road | | | 19 July 1984 | TL7929733189; 51°58′06″N 0°36′31″E | | 1337992 | Upload Photo | Q26622344 |
| Hulls Mill House Barn Adjoining Road and Approximately 10 Metres North of House | II | Hulls Mill Road | | | 19 July 1984 | TL7928833215; 51°58′07″N 0°36′31″E | | 1338011 | Upload Photo | Q26622362 |
| Hulls Mill House Granary Approximately 5 Metres North East of House | II | Hulls Mill Road | | | 19 July 1984 | TL7930833225; 51°58′07″N 0°36′32″E | | 1123046 | Upload Photo | Q26416141 |
| Hulls Mill House Wall Between Granary and Barn to North Qv 3/98 and 3/96 | II | Hulls Mill Road | | | 19 July 1984 | TL7929433221; 51°58′07″N 0°36′31″E | | 1123047 | Upload Photo | Q26416142 |
| Hulls Mill House Wall Between Granary and Barn to South Qv 3/96 and 3/98 | II | Hulls Mill Road | | | 19 July 1984 | TL7929233209; 51°58′06″N 0°36′31″E | | 1123045 | Upload Photo | Q26416140 |
| Little Lodge | II | Little Maplestead Road | | | 19 July 1984 | TL8169534259; 51°58′38″N 0°38′39″E | | 1123052 | Upload Photo | Q26416147 |
| Shouldersticks Hall | II | Little Maplestead Road | | | 19 July 1984 | TL8094533925; 51°58′28″N 0°37′59″E | | 1123051 | Upload Photo | Q26416146 |
| Wardens House | II | Little Maplestead Road | | | 19 July 1984 | TL8069134031; 51°58′31″N 0°37′46″E | | 1123049 | Upload Photo | Q26416144 |
| Wardens House Outbuilding Adjoining Road and Approximately 25 Metres South West of House | II | Little Maplestead Road | | | 19 July 1984 | TL8067834004; 51°58′30″N 0°37′45″E | | 1123050 | Upload Photo | Q26416145 |
| Forge Cottage Former Smithy, Approximately 10 Metres North West of Cottage | II | Approximately 10 Metres North West Of Cottage, Lucking Street | | | 21 June 1962 | TL8102834537; 51°58′47″N 0°38′04″E | | 1168427 | Upload Photo | Q26461677 |
| Brook Cottage Croft Cottage | II | Lucking Street | | | 19 July 1984 | TL8114734349; 51°58′41″N 0°38′10″E | | 1168500 | Upload Photo | Q26461748 |
| Cottage Approximately 120 Metres South of Brook and Croft Cottages | II | Lucking Street | | | 19 July 1984 | TL8115334233; 51°58′37″N 0°38′10″E | | 1123056 | Upload Photo | Q26416151 |
| Forge Cottage | II | Lucking Street | | | 21 June 1962 | TL8104034527; 51°58′47″N 0°38′05″E | | 1338012 | Upload Photo | Q26622363 |
| Luckinghouse Farm Barn Approximately 45 Metres North East of House | II | Lucking Street | | | 19 July 1984 | TL8115034487; 51°58′46″N 0°38′10″E | | 1123054 | Upload Photo | Q26416149 |
| Luckinghouse Farm Oast House Approximately 8 Metres West of House | II | Lucking Street | | | 19 July 1984 | TL8109234433; 51°58′44″N 0°38′07″E | | 1338013 | Upload Photo | Q26622364 |
| Luckinghouse Farm Outbuilding Adjacent to Road Approximately 20 Metres East of House | II | Lucking Street | | | 19 July 1984 | TL8114234464; 51°58′45″N 0°38′10″E | | 1168478 | Upload Photo | Q26461728 |
| Luckinghouse Farm Outbuilding Approximately 40 Metres North East of House | II | Lucking Street | | | 19 July 1984 | TL8111334498; 51°58′46″N 0°38′09″E | | 1123055 | Upload Photo | Q26416150 |
| Luckinghouse Farmhouse | II | Lucking Street | | | 21 June 1962 | TL8111734444; 51°58′44″N 0°38′09″E | | 1168444 | Upload Photo | Q26461692 |
| Mossings | II | Lucking Street | | | 21 June 1962 | TL8105534508; 51°58′46″N 0°38′06″E | | 1123053 | Upload Photo | Q26416148 |
| Skippers | II | Lucking Street | | | 19 July 1984 | TL8114634377; 51°58′42″N 0°38′10″E | | 1338014 | Upload Photo | Q26622365 |
| St Giles Cottage | II | Lucking Street | | | 21 June 1962 | TL8115334402; 51°58′43″N 0°38′10″E | | 1306995 | Upload Photo | Q26593714 |
| Mill Farm House | II | Mill Lane | | | 19 July 1984 | TL8127033679; 51°58′19″N 0°38′15″E | | 1168519 | Upload Photo | Q26461768 |
| Mill Farm Stables Approximately 25 Metres South West of House | II | Mill Lane | | | 19 July 1984 | TL8125633654; 51°58′18″N 0°38′14″E | | 1338015 | Upload Photo | Q26622366 |
| Purls Hill Farm Barn Adjoining Road and Approximately 70 Metres South West of Purls Hill House | II | Purls Hill | | | 19 July 1984 | TL7974733962; 51°58′30″N 0°36′56″E | | 1123057 | Upload Photo | Q26416152 |
| Purls Hill Farm Byre Adjoining Barn Qv 3/120 | II | Purls Hill | | | 19 July 1984 | TL7975033980; 51°58′31″N 0°36′56″E | | 1123058 | Upload Photo | Q26416153 |
| Purls Hill Farm Outbuilding Approximately 25 Metres South West of Purls Hill House | II | Purls Hill | | | 19 July 1984 | TL7972934006; 51°58′32″N 0°36′55″E | | 1306942 | Upload Photo | Q26593666 |
| Hopewells Farm Farm Building Range Approximately 70 Metres South East of House and 25 Metres East of Barn 3/126 | II | Sible Hedingham Road | | | 19 July 1984 | TL7924834615; 51°58′52″N 0°36′31″E | | 1168569 | Upload Photo | Q26461815 |
| Hopwells Farm Barn Approximately 30 Metres West of Farm Building 3/125 | II | Sible Hedingham Road | | | 19 July 1984 | TL7922934591; 51°58′51″N 0°36′30″E | | 1123059 | Upload Photo | Q26416154 |
| Hopwells Farmhouse | II | Sible Hedingham Road | | | 7 August 1952 | TL7919734671; 51°58′54″N 0°36′29″E | | 1338016 | Upload Photo | Q26622367 |
| Hosden's Farm House | II | Sible Hedingham Road | | | 19 July 1984 | TL7969934968; 51°59′03″N 0°36′55″E | | 1306921 | Upload Photo | Q26593645 |
| Barretts Hall | II | Toldish Hall Road, CO9 2QX | | | 19 July 1984 | TL8059134044; 51°58′32″N 0°37′40″E | | 1123048 | Upload Photo | Q26416143 |

== See also ==
- Grade I listed buildings in Essex
- Grade II* listed buildings in Essex

== Sources ==
- Bettley, James; Pevsner, Nikolaus (2007) [1954], Essex, The Buildings of England, New Haven and London: Yale University Press, ISBN 978-0-300-11614-4
