= Grade II* listed buildings in the City of Chelmsford =

There are over 20,000 Grade II* listed buildings in England. This page is a list of these buildings in the City of Chelmsford in Essex.

== List of buildings ==
Name	Location	Type	Completed (Note: The date given is the date used by Historic England as significant for the initial building or that of an important part in the structure's description.)	Date designated	Grid ref. (Note: Sometimes known as OSGB36, the grid reference is based on the British national grid reference system used by the Ordnance Survey.) Geo-coordinates	Entry number (Note: The "List Entry Number" is a unique number assigned to each listed building and scheduled monument by Historic England.)	Image
The Old Rectory	Boreham	House	17th century	10 April 1967	TL7557109521; 51°45′25″N 0°32′33″E	1338401	The Old Rectory More images
Church of St Mary the Virgin	Broomfield	Church	Late 11th century	10 April 1967	TL7052410473; 51°46′01″N 0°28′11″E	1338425	Church of St Mary the Virgin More images
Former Church of St James	Chignal St James, Chignall	House	Late 13th and early 14th century	10 April 1967	TL6695209663; 51°45′39″N 0°25′04″E	1122199	Former Church of St James More images
Chobbing's Farmhouse	Chignal St James, Chignall	Farmhouse	Late 14th century	19 June 1975	TL6863709414; 51°45′29″N 0°26′31″E	1306286	Chobbing's Farmhouse More images
Church of St Nicholas	Chignall Smealy, Chignall	Church	Early 16th century	10 April 1967	TL6678711617; 51°46′42″N 0°24′59″E	1170018	Church of St Nicholas More images
Slough House	Danbury	House	17th century	29 December 1952	TL8051803134; 51°41′53″N 0°36′39″E	1122172	Slough House More images
Willis Farmhouse	East Hanningfield	Farmhouse	Early 16th century	29 December 1952	TL7717000799; 51°40′41″N 0°33′40″E	1122177	Upload Photo
Barn at Great Seabrights Farm	Galleywood	Barn	18th century	29 May 1981	TL7179703852; 51°42′26″N 0°29′06″E	1237350	Barn at Great Seabrights Farm More images
Church of St Andrew	Good Easter	Church	c.1200	10 April 1967	TL6264012077; 51°47′01″N 0°21′23″E	1122143	Church of St Andrew More images
Church of St John the Evangelist	Little Leighs, Great and Little Leighs	Church	Early 12th century	10 April 1967	TL7189916750; 51°49′23″N 0°29′34″E	1122132	Church of St John the Evangelist More images
The Vicarage	Great Baddow	House	Early 18th century	19 June 1975	TL7298004755; 51°42′53″N 0°30′09″E	1170837	Upload Photo
66 and 68 High Street	Great Baddow	House	17th century	10 April 1967	TL7288004850; 51°42′57″N 0°30′04″E	1170982	Upload Photo
Black Chapel Cottage	North End, Great Waltham	House	Late 15th century	10 April 1967	TL6634318187; 51°50′15″N 0°24′47″E	1171938	Black Chapel Cottage More images
Bollingtons	Great Waltham	House	18th century	29 December 1952	TL6960213454; 51°47′38″N 0°27′29″E	1122056	Bollingtons More images
Fitzjohn's Farmhouse	Great Waltham	Farmhouse	15th century	10 April 1967	TL6756613738; 51°47′50″N 0°25′43″E	1171901	Fitzjohn's Farmhouse More images
Hillhouse Farmhouse	Howe Street, Great Waltham	Farmhouse	16th century	29 December 1952	TL7003915437; 51°48′42″N 0°27′55″E	1338490	Upload Photo
Wisemans	Great Waltham	Jettied house	16th century	10 April 1967	TL6942413501; 51°47′40″N 0°27′19″E	1305525	Upload Photo
Little Baddow Hall	Little Baddow	House	16th century	29 December 1952	TL7644108022; 51°44′35″N 0°33′15″E	1338483	Little Baddow Hall More images
Old Riffhams	Little Baddow	House	Mid-16th century	29 December 1952	TL7770506565; 51°43′47″N 0°34′18″E	1122037	Old Riffhams More images
Brick revetting to moat and octagonal turrets at north-west and south-west angles, Killigrews	Margaretting	Moat	Early 16th century	10 April 1967	TL6883502787; 51°41′54″N 0°26′30″E	1152176	Upload Photo
Church of St Margaret	Margaretting	Church	Early–mid-15th century	10 April 1967	TL6651200422; 51°40′40″N 0°24′25″E	1338504	Church of St Margaret More images
Killigrews	Margaretting	House	1714	29 December 1952	TL6886502777; 51°41′54″N 0°26′32″E	1338505	Upload Photo
Church (of no known dedication)	Mashbury	Church	12th century	10 April 1967	TL6515011856; 51°46′52″N 0°23′34″E	1265087	Church (of no known dedication) More images
Church of Holy Trinity	Pleshey	Church	c.1394	10 April 1967	TL6632814297; 51°48′09″N 0°24′39″E	1235569	Church of Holy Trinity More images
Church of St Michael and All Angels	Roxwell	Church	14th century	10 April 1967	TL6454608490; 51°45′03″N 0°22′56″E	1235784	Church of St Michael and All Angels More images
Church of St Andrew	Sandon	Church	12th century	10 April 1967	TL7431104813; 51°42′54″N 0°31′19″E	1235849	Church of St Andrew More images
The Rectory	Sandon	House	Mid-18th century	10 April 1967	TL7424404668; 51°42′49″N 0°31′15″E	1264863	Upload Photo
Church of St Peter	South Hanningfield	Parish church	Late 11th-century or early 12th-century origin	10 April 1967	TQ7444698056; 51°39′15″N 0°31′13″E	1236422	Church of St Peter More images
Church of St Mary	Buttsbury, Stock	Church	14th–15th century	10 April 1967	TQ6638498622; 51°39′42″N 0°24′15″E	1264434	Church of St Mary More images
Stock Windmill	Stock	Tower mill	18th century	10 April 1967	TQ6981598781; 51°39′44″N 0°27′14″E	1264461	Stock Windmill More images
Church of St Mary and St Edward	West Hanningfield	Church	12th century	10 April 1967	TQ7350899825; 51°40′13″N 0°30′28″E	1236738	Church of St Mary and St Edward More images
Colevile Hall	West Hanningfield	House	Late 16th century	10 April 1967	TL7153600246; 51°40′29″N 0°28′46″E	1236888	Upload Photo
Edwins Hall	Woodham Ferrers and Bicknacre	House	Late 16th century	29 December 1952	TQ8115599386; 51°39′51″N 0°37′05″E	1236906	Edwins Hall More images
Barn south-west of Lordship Farm	Writtle	Aisled barn	Late 15th–early 16th century	19 June 1975	TL6766606676; 51°44′01″N 0°25′36″E	1264255	Upload Photo
Church of All Saints	Writtle	Church	Late 12th century	10 April 1967	TL6775006145; 51°43′44″N 0°25′39″E	1237229	Church of All Saints More images
Hylands House	Hylands Park, Writtle	Country house	c.1728	10 April 1967	TL6848504195; 51°42′40″N 0°26′14″E	1264253	Hylands House More images
Moor Hall	Newney Green, Writtle	House	16th century	29 December 1952	TL6498306467; 51°43′57″N 0°23′16″E	1237175	Upload Photo
All Saints Church, Springfield	Springfield	Church	Nave c.1100	20 May 1949	TL7195107986; 51°44′39″N 0°29′21″E	1186867	All Saints Church, Springfield More images
Lodge Farmhouse	Chelmsford	House	c.1280–1330	14 December 1978	TL6936802736; 51°41′52″N 0°26′58″E	1141329	Upload Photo
Shire Hall	Chelmsford	Shire hall	1790–91	20 May 1949	TL7084406902; 51°44′05″N 0°28′22″E	1141328	Shire Hall More images
The Old Rectory	Chelmsford	House	1752	20 May 1949	TL7180707933; 51°44′38″N 0°29′14″E	1263936	Upload Photo
The Old Rectory	Springfield	House	1752	20 May 1949	TL7181007936; 51°44′38″N 0°29′14″E	1141369	Upload Photo
26 High Street	Chelmsford	House	Early 18th century	20 April 1949	TL7099306733; 51°44′00″N 0°28′29″E	1328766	Upload Photo

== See also ==
- Grade II* listed buildings in Essex
  - Grade II* listed buildings in Basildon (district)
  - Grade II* listed buildings in Braintree (district)
  - Grade II* listed buildings in Brentwood (borough)
  - Grade II* listed buildings in Castle Point
  - Grade II* listed buildings in Colchester (borough)
  - Grade II* listed buildings in Epping Forest (district)
  - Grade II* listed buildings in Harlow
  - Grade II* listed buildings in Maldon (district)
  - Grade II* listed buildings in Rochford (district)
  - Grade II* listed buildings in Southend-on-Sea
  - Grade II* listed buildings in Tendring
  - Grade II* listed buildings in Thurrock
  - Grade II* listed buildings in Uttlesford
- Grade I listed buildings in Essex
