= Grade II* listed buildings in Castle Point =

There are over 20,000 Grade II* listed buildings in England. This page is a list of these buildings in the district of Castle Point in Essex.

== List of buildings ==
Name	Location	Type	Completed (Note: The date given is the date used by Historic England as significant for the initial building or that of an important part in the structure's description.)	Date designated	Grid ref. (Note: The grid reference is based on the British national grid reference system, sometimes known as OSGB36, used by the Ordnance Survey.) Geo-coordinates	Entry number (Note: The "List Entry Number" is a unique number assigned to each listed building and scheduled monument by Historic England.)	Image
Church of St Peter	Thundersley	Parish church	c.1200	7 August 1952	TQ7828188682; 51°34′08″N 0°34′16″E	1170125	Church of St Peter More images
Shipwrights	Benfleet Rd	House	c.1937	30 October 1979	TQ7952786840; 51°33′07″N 0°35′17″E	1337691	Shipwrights
The Anchor Inn and building attached to right	South Benfleet	Clergy house	Late 14th century	22 July 1986	TQ7788286100; 51°32′45″N 0°33′50″E	1123689	The Anchor Inn and building attached to right More images

== See also ==
- Grade II* listed buildings in Essex
  - Grade II* listed buildings in Basildon (district)
  - Grade II* listed buildings in Braintree (district)
  - Grade II* listed buildings in Brentwood (borough)
  - Grade II* listed buildings in Chelmsford (borough)
  - Grade II* listed buildings in Colchester (borough)
  - Grade II* listed buildings in Epping Forest (district)
  - Grade II* listed buildings in Harlow
  - Grade II* listed buildings in Maldon (district)
  - Grade II* listed buildings in Rochford (district)
  - Grade II* listed buildings in Southend-on-Sea
  - Grade II* listed buildings in Tendring
  - Grade II* listed buildings in Thurrock
  - Grade II* listed buildings in Uttlesford
- Grade I listed buildings in Essex
