= Listed buildings in Castle Hedingham =

Historic structures in Essex, England

Castle Hedingham is a village and civil parish in the Braintree District of Essex, England. It contains 138 listed buildings that are recorded in the National Heritage List for England. Of these two are grade I, four are grade II* and 132 are grade II.

This list is based on the information retrieved online from Historic England.

== Key ==
Grade	Criteria
I	Buildings that are of exceptional interest
II*	Particularly important buildings of more than special interest
II	Buildings that are of special interest

== Listing ==
Name	Grade	Location	Type	Completed (Note: The date given is the date used by Historic England as significant for the initial building or that of an important part in the structure's description.)	Date designated	Grid ref. (Note: The grid reference is based on the British national grid reference system, sometimes known as OSGB36, used by the Ordnance Survey.) Geo-coordinates	Notes	Entry number (Note: The "List Entry Number" is a unique number assigned to each listed building and scheduled monument by Historic England.)	Image	Wikidata
Dovecote at Hedingham Castle	II	CO0 3DJ			21 June 1962	TL7886335796; 51°59′31″N 0°36′13″E		1233895	Upload Photo	Q26527332
Hedingham Castle	I	CO9 3DJ	castle		7 August 1952	TL7870735867; 51°59′33″N 0°36′05″E		1122959	Hedingham Castle More images	Q1146583
Hedingham Castle House and Detached Service Wing	II*	CO9 3DJ	architectural structure		21 June 1962	TL7879235891; 51°59′34″N 0°36′10″E		1122962	Hedingham Castle House and Detached Service Wing More images	Q17557225
Stable Block at Hedingham Castle	II	CO9 3DJ			15 October 1984	TL7875835894; 51°59′34″N 0°36′08″E		1122961	Upload Photo	Q26416062
Tudor Bridge at Hedingham Castle	II*	CO9 3DJ	bridge		21 June 1962	TL7875435888; 51°59′34″N 0°36′08″E		1122960	Tudor Bridge at Hedingham Castle More images	Q17557220
Nunnery Farm, Barn Adjacent to Road and North of Farmhouse	II	Barn Adjacent To Road And North Of Farmhouse, Nunnery Street			15 October 1984	TL7776935618; 51°59′26″N 0°35′16″E		1338076	Upload Photo	Q26622422
Dower House	II	23, Bayley Street			21 June 1962	TL7857435722; 51°59′28″N 0°35′58″E		1233896	Upload Photo	Q26527333
29, Bayley Street	II	29, Bayley Street			15 October 1984	TL7854835745; 51°59′29″N 0°35′57″E		1276376	Upload Photo	Q26565892
Hillcrest the Dolls House	II	31, Bayley Street			15 October 1984	TL7853735751; 51°59′29″N 0°35′56″E		1122963	Upload Photo	Q26416063
37, Bayley Street	II	37, Bayley Street			15 October 1984	TL7852635760; 51°59′30″N 0°35′55″E		1122964	Upload Photo	Q26416064
2, Castle Lane	II	2, Castle Lane			15 October 1984	TL7860635699; 51°59′28″N 0°36′00″E		1122966	Upload Photo	Q26416066
Tinkers Veres Cottage	II	6, Castle Lane			15 October 1984	TL7859835683; 51°59′27″N 0°35′59″E		1122965	Upload Photo	Q26416065
Veres	II	8, Castle Lane			21 June 1962	TL7858435671; 51°59′27″N 0°35′58″E		1338047	Upload Photo	Q26622395
1-8, Church Lane	II	1-8, Church Lane			15 October 1984	TL7842235599; 51°59′25″N 0°35′50″E		1338049	Upload Photo	Q26622396
9-12, Church Lane	II	9-12, Church Lane			21 June 1962	TL7843435582; 51°59′24″N 0°35′50″E		1122968	Upload Photo	Q26416068
Barn Adjacent to Right of Number 1	II	Church Lane			15 October 1984	TL7840435636; 51°59′26″N 0°35′49″E		1168368	Upload Photo	Q26461625
Church of St Nicholas	I	Church Lane	church building		21 June 1962	TL7846935604; 51°59′25″N 0°35′52″E		1338048	Church of St Nicholas More images	Q17536273
Church of St Nicholas War Memorial Cross in South East Corner of Churchyard Approximately 30 Metres South East of Chancel	II	Church Lane	war memorial		21 June 1962	TL7850035592; 51°59′24″N 0°35′54″E		1122967	Church of St Nicholas War Memorial Cross in South East Corner of Churchyard Approximately 30 Metres South East of Chancel More images	Q26416067
Church Cottage Pump Cottage	II	3, Church Ponds			21 June 1962	TL7843435640; 51°59′26″N 0°35′50″E		1122971	Upload Photo	Q26416071
4, Church Ponds	II	4, Church Ponds			21 June 1962	TL7852235624; 51°59′25″N 0°35′55″E		1307020	Upload Photo	Q26593735
Melford	II	6, Church Ponds			21 June 1962	TL7851335628; 51°59′25″N 0°35′55″E		1122969	Upload Photo	Q26416069
Glenthorne	II	8, Church Ponds			21 June 1962	TL7851235633; 51°59′26″N 0°35′55″E		1168383	Upload Photo	Q26461639
Sloemans	II	10, Church Ponds			21 June 1962	TL7850035637; 51°59′26″N 0°35′54″E		1338050	Upload Photo	Q26622397
The Bakery	II	12, Church Ponds			21 June 1962	TL7849335656; 51°59′26″N 0°35′54″E		1168399	Upload Photo	Q26461653
14, 16 and 18, Church Ponds	II	14, 16 and 18, Church Ponds			21 June 1962	TL7848235649; 51°59′26″N 0°35′53″E		1122970	Upload Photo	Q26416070
20 and 22, Church Ponds	II	20 and 22, Church Ponds			21 June 1962	TL7846435653; 51°59′26″N 0°35′52″E		1168410	Upload Photo	Q26461662
24 and 26, Church Ponds	II	24 and 26, Church Ponds			15 October 1984	TL7845535655; 51°59′26″N 0°35′52″E		1338051	Upload Photo	Q26622398
30, 34, 36, 38, Church Ponds	II	30, 34, 36, 38, Church Ponds			15 October 1969	TL7844135656; 51°59′26″N 0°35′51″E		1307004	Upload Photo	Q26593721
The Old Crown	II	1, Crown Street			15 October 1984	TL7840035654; 51°59′26″N 0°35′49″E		1338052	Upload Photo	Q26622399
2 and 4, Crown Street	II	2 and 4, Crown Street			15 October 1984	TL7841935670; 51°59′27″N 0°35′50″E		1122972	Upload Photo	Q26416072
3, Crown Street	II	3, Crown Street			15 October 1984	TL7839735662; 51°59′27″N 0°35′49″E		1168436	Upload Photo	Q26461684
5, Crown Street	II	5, Crown Street			6 June 1988	TL7839635686; 51°59′27″N 0°35′49″E		1233867	Upload Photo	Q26527306
14, Crown Street	II	14, Crown Street			7 February 1980	TL7842335732; 51°59′29″N 0°35′50″E		1168455	Upload Photo	Q26461702
1, Falcon Square	II	1, Falcon Square			21 June 1962	TL7851535602; 51°59′25″N 0°35′55″E		1122973	Upload Photo	Q26416073
Heron Cottage	II	2, Falcon Square			21 June 1962	TL7851535606; 51°59′25″N 0°35′55″E		1168465	Upload Photo	Q26461711
Bennets	II	3, Falcon Square			21 June 1962	TL7853535618; 51°59′25″N 0°35′56″E		1338053	Upload Photo	Q26622400
Falcon House	II	4, Falcon Square			7 August 1952	TL7854135616; 51°59′25″N 0°35′56″E		1168477	Upload Photo	Q26461727
5 and 6, Falcon Square	II	5 and 6, Falcon Square			21 June 1962	TL7855635614; 51°59′25″N 0°35′57″E		1122974	Upload Photo	Q26416074
Porters	II	7, Falcon Square			7 August 1952	TL7857435605; 51°59′25″N 0°35′58″E		1168493	Upload Photo	Q26461743
8, Falcon Square	II	8, Falcon Square			21 June 1962	TL7855235592; 51°59′24″N 0°35′57″E		1338054	Upload Photo	Q26622401
9, Falcon Square	II	9, Falcon Square			21 June 1962	TL7854635590; 51°59′24″N 0°35′56″E		1122975	Upload Photo	Q26416075
10, Falcon Square	II	10, Falcon Square			21 June 1962	TL7853635587; 51°59′24″N 0°35′56″E		1306966	Upload Photo	Q26593685
11 and 12, Falcon Square	II	11 and 12, Falcon Square			21 June 1962	TL7852435575; 51°59′24″N 0°35′55″E		1122976	Upload Photo	Q26416076
The Vicarage, Including Section of Curved Wall Attached to Left and Right of House	II*	Including Section Of Curved Wall Attached To Left And Right Of House, 15, Queen Street			21 June 1952	TL7849035409; 51°59′18″N 0°35′53″E		1338045	Upload Photo	Q17557922
Hedingham House	II	1, King Street			13 November 1978	TL7851135546; 51°59′23″N 0°35′54″E		1168524	Upload Photo	Q26461773
2 and 4, King Street	II	2 and 4, King Street			21 June 1962	TL7852335565; 51°59′23″N 0°35′55″E		1122977	Upload Photo	Q26416077
3, King Street	II	3, King Street			21 June 1962	TL7851035557; 51°59′23″N 0°35′54″E		1338055	Upload Photo	Q26622402
Augusta House	II	5, King Street			21 June 1962	TL7850035574; 51°59′24″N 0°35′54″E		1168532	Upload Photo	Q26461781
Priestfields Farm, Barn Approximately 30 Metres North East of House	II	Barn Approximately 30 Metres North East Of House, Kirby Hall Lane			15 October 1984	TL7850338107; 52°00′46″N 0°35′59″E		1276377	Upload Photo	Q26565893
Priestfields Farm, Barn Approximately 50 Metres North East of House	II	Barn Approximately 50 Metres North East Of House, Kirby Hall Lane			15 October 1984	TL7851638148; 52°00′47″N 0°35′59″E		1122978	Upload Photo	Q26416078
Hewson's Farmhouse	II	Kirby Hall Lane			15 October 1984	TL7827437615; 52°00′30″N 0°35′46″E		1168591	Upload Photo	Q26461835
Newhouse Farmhouse	II	Kirby Hall Lane			15 October 1984	TL7831137379; 52°00′22″N 0°35′47″E		1122979	Upload Photo	Q26416079
Priestfields Farmhouse	II	Kirby Hall Lane			15 October 1984	TL7844738122; 52°00′46″N 0°35′56″E		1306953	Upload Photo	Q26593675
Priestfields Farm, Stable/byre Range Approximately 30 Metres North of House	II	Stable/byre Range Approximately 30 Metres North Of House, Kirby Hall Road			15 October 1984	TL7845738141; 52°00′47″N 0°35′56″E		1338018	Upload Photo	Q26622368
Kirby Hall	II	Kirby Hall Road	house		7 August 1952	TL7770737298; 52°00′20″N 0°35′15″E		1168539	Kirby Hall More images	Q26461788
Luce's Cottage	II	Luce's Lane			15 October 1984	TL7861235582; 51°59′24″N 0°36′00″E		1122926	Upload Photo	Q26416032
1, Luces Lane	II	1, Luces Lane			15 October 1984	TL7858835599; 51°59′24″N 0°35′58″E		1306930	Upload Photo	Q26593654
Gazebo at Rear of 34, North West Corner of Garden	II	North West Corner Of Garden, Queen Street			15 October 1984	TL7837435389; 51°59′18″N 0°35′47″E		1168796	Upload Photo	Q26462035
Nunnery Farm, Cartlodge Approximately 20 Metres East of House	II	Cartlodge Approximately 20 Metres East Of House, Nunnery Street			15 October 1984	TL7782635603; 51°59′25″N 0°35′19″E		1122944	Upload Photo	Q26416048
Nunnery Farm, Stable Block Approximately 30 Metres North East of House	II	Stable Block Approximately 30 Metres North East Of House, Nunnery Street			15 October 1984	TL7780635610; 51°59′26″N 0°35′17″E		1122943	Upload Photo	Q26416047
Nunnery Farm, Small Cartlodge Approx 35 Metres North East of House	II	Small Cartlodge Approx 35 Metres North East Of House, Nunnery Street			15 October 1984	TL7777035601; 51°59′25″N 0°35′16″E		1338037	Upload Photo	Q26622386
Cherry Lawn Fern Cottage	II	58, Nunnery Street			21 June 1962	TL7805535788; 51°59′31″N 0°35′31″E		1122945	Upload Photo	Q26416049
Cherry Cottage Lindon Cottage	II	64, Nunnery Street			21 June 1962	TL7804035780; 51°59′31″N 0°35′30″E		1338038	Upload Photo	Q26622387
66, 68 and 70, Nunnery Street	II	66, 68 and 70, Nunnery Street			21 June 1962	TL7803635783; 51°59′31″N 0°35′30″E		1122946	Upload Photo	Q26416050
Possibly Cottage North of the Rising Sun Inn	II	72, Nunnery Street			15 October 1984	TL7803235794; 51°59′31″N 0°35′30″E		1122947	Upload Photo	Q26416051
74, Nunnery Street	II	74, Nunnery Street			15 October 1984	TL7802635807; 51°59′32″N 0°35′29″E		1168673	Upload Photo	Q26461917
95, Nunnery Street	II	95, Nunnery Street			15 October 1984	TL7779835648; 51°59′27″N 0°35′17″E		1122941	Upload Photo	Q26416045
106 and 108, Nunnery Street	II	106 and 108, Nunnery Street			15 October 1984	TL7785835695; 51°59′28″N 0°35′20″E		1338039	Upload Photo	Q26622388
118 and 120, Nunnery Street	II	118 and 120, Nunnery Street			15 October 1984	TL7777235658; 51°59′27″N 0°35′16″E		1168677	Upload Photo	Q26461920
122 and 124, Nunnery Street	II	122 and 124, Nunnery Street			15 October 1984	TL7777035651; 51°59′27″N 0°35′16″E		1122948	Upload Photo	Q26416052
132, Nunnery Street	II	132, Nunnery Street			15 October 1984	TL7773935626; 51°59′26″N 0°35′14″E		1168713	Upload Photo	Q26461953
Nunnery Farmhouse	II	Nunnery Street			7 August 1952	TL7780735577; 51°59′25″N 0°35′17″E		1122942	Upload Photo	Q26416046
The Rising Sun Inn	II	Nunnery Street	pub		21 June 1962	TL7795035701; 51°59′28″N 0°35′25″E		1122940	The Rising Sun Inn More images	Q26416044
Wood Hall	II	Nunnery Street			15 October 1984	TL7799035731; 51°59′29″N 0°35′27″E		1122980	Upload Photo	Q26416080
Kirby Hall, Outbuilding Adjacent to West of House	II	Outbuilding Adjacent To West Of House, Kirby Hall Road			15 October 1984	TL7771137299; 52°00′20″N 0°35′16″E		1338056	Upload Photo	Q26622403
1 and 2, Pottery Lane	II	1 and 2, Pottery Lane			15 October 1984	TL7855835498; 51°59′21″N 0°35′57″E		1338040	Upload Photo	Q26622389
Astles	II	1, Pye Corner			21 June 1962	TL7840335777; 51°59′30″N 0°35′49″E		1122949	Upload Photo	Q26416053
3, Pye Corner	II	3, Pye Corner			21 June 1962	TL7838235822; 51°59′32″N 0°35′48″E		1338041	Upload Photo	Q26622390
5,6,7 and 8, Pye Corner	II	5, 6, 7 and 8, Pye Corner			21 June 1962	TL7841235811; 51°59′32″N 0°35′50″E		1306879	Upload Photo	Q26593608
Rose Cottage	II	9, Pye Corner			11 November 1975	TL7844235816; 51°59′32″N 0°35′51″E		1122950	Upload Photo	Q26416054
11 and 12, Pye Corner	II	11 and 12, Pye Corner			25 January 1993	TL7844335790; 51°59′31″N 0°35′51″E		1233868	Upload Photo	Q26527307
13, Pye Corner	II	13, Pye Corner			15 October 1984	TL7843835780; 51°59′30″N 0°35′51″E		1168760	Upload Photo	Q26462000
Number 1 (astles) Iron Railings to Front of House	II	Pye Corner			15 October 1984	TL7840835784; 51°59′31″N 0°35′49″E		1168736	Upload Photo	Q26461974
1, Queen Street	II	1, Queen Street			15 October 1984	TL7851735518; 51°59′22″N 0°35′55″E		1338046	Upload Photo	Q26622394
Palmers	II	4, Queen Street			21 June 1962	TL7850035509; 51°59′22″N 0°35′54″E		1122953	Upload Photo	Q26416056
19, Queen Street	II	19, Queen Street			15 October 1984	TL7845035394; 51°59′18″N 0°35′51″E		1306816	Upload Photo	Q26593550
Stocks	II	21, Queen Street			21 June 1962	TL7844735349; 51°59′17″N 0°35′51″E		1338044	Upload Photo	Q26622393
22, 24 and 26, Queen Street	II	22, 24 and 26, Queen Street			15 October 1984	TL7844935415; 51°59′19″N 0°35′51″E		1338043	Upload Photo	Q26622392
Sheepcote	II	23, Queen Street			21 June 1962	TL7842635334; 51°59′16″N 0°35′49″E		1306808	Upload Photo	Q26593542
Flaglands Cottage	II	25, Queen Street			15 October 1984	TL7839635312; 51°59′15″N 0°35′48″E		1122954	Upload Photo	Q26416057
The Manse, the Cedars and Gray's Shop	II	38, Queen Street			21 June 1962	TL7839835352; 51°59′17″N 0°35′48″E		1338042	Upload Photo	Q26622391
40, Queen Street	II	40, Queen Street			15 October 1984	TL7838435337; 51°59′16″N 0°35′47″E		1168781	Upload Photo	Q26462021
Castle Hedingham United Reform Church	II*	Queen Street			15 October 1984	TL7840535390; 51°59′18″N 0°35′48″E		1122952	Upload Photo	Q17557217
Iron Railings to Front and Left Return of Left Garden (26)	II	Queen Street			15 October 1984	TL7844035404; 51°59′18″N 0°35′50″E		1306829	Upload Photo	Q26593561
Number 15 (the Vicarage) Pump Approximately 5 Metres Left of House	II	Queen Street			15 October 1984	TL7849935416; 51°59′19″N 0°35′53″E		1306787	Upload Photo	Q26593523
Number 15 (the Vicarage) Wall Enclosing the Garden of the House	II	Queen Street			15 October 1984	TL7849935443; 51°59′20″N 0°35′53″E		1122956	Upload Photo	Q26416059
Number 17 (trinity Hall) Front Garden Wall	II	Queen Street			15 October 1984	TL7845935410; 51°59′18″N 0°35′51″E		1168876	Upload Photo	Q26462102
Pooles Bridge Tl 782 351	II	Queen Street			15 October 1984	TL7813735083; 51°59′08″N 0°35′34″E		1122951	Upload Photo	Q26416055
The Wheatsheaf Inn	II	Queen Street	pub		7 August 1952	TL7850435533; 51°59′22″N 0°35′54″E		1168816	The Wheatsheaf Inn More images	Q26462049
Trinity Hall	II	Queen Street			7 August 1952	TL7846235400; 51°59′18″N 0°35′51″E		1122955	Upload Photo	Q26416058
Rushley Green Farm, Barn Approximately 30 Metres North West of House	II	Barn Approximately 30 Metres North West Of House, Rosemary Lane			15 October 1984	TL7853736442; 51°59′52″N 0°35′57″E		1122921	Upload Photo	Q26416026
Great Lodge Farm, Barn Approximately 35 Metres South East of House	II	Barn Approximately 35 Metres South East Of House, Rosemary Lane			15 October 1984	TL7934136814; 52°00′03″N 0°36′40″E		1168915	Upload Photo	Q26462139
Great Lodge Farmhouse	II	Rosemary Lane			21 June 1962	TL7932736852; 52°00′04″N 0°36′39″E		1122957	Upload Photo	Q26416060
Keepers Cottage	II	Rosemary Lane			15 October 1984	TL7884236235; 51°59′45″N 0°36′13″E		1122958	Upload Photo	Q26416061
Lawrence's Farmhouse	II	Rosemary Lane			15 October 1984	TL7944136462; 51°59′51″N 0°36′45″E		1168903	Upload Photo	Q26462125
Lippingwell's Farmhouse	II	Rosemary Lane			15 October 1984	TL7868336863; 52°00′05″N 0°36′06″E		1122922	Upload Photo	Q26416027
Smarts Cottage	II	Rosemary Lane			15 October 1984	TL7860936535; 51°59′55″N 0°36′01″E		1338066	Upload Photo	Q26622413
Yeomans	II	Rosemary Lane			15 October 1984	TL7878136366; 51°59′49″N 0°36′10″E		1306801	Upload Photo	Q26593535
Trinity Cottage	II	Sheepcote Lane			15 October 1984	TL7845635367; 51°59′17″N 0°35′51″E		1338072	Upload Photo	Q26622419
The Old Moot House	II	1, St James Street			21 June 1962	TL7852535559; 51°59′23″N 0°35′55″E		1122923	Upload Photo	Q26416028
Buckleys and Buckley Saxon Cycles	II	9, St James Street			21 June 1962	TL7857535573; 51°59′24″N 0°35′58″E		1122924	Upload Photo	Q26416029
Bank House	II	11, St James Street			21 June 1962	TL7859335572; 51°59′24″N 0°35′59″E		1338068	Upload Photo	Q26622415
14 and 16, St James Street	II	14 and 16, St James Street			21 June 1962	TL7858835551; 51°59′23″N 0°35′58″E		1122928	Upload Photo	Q26416034
15, St James Street	II	15, St James Street			21 June 1962	TL7860435571; 51°59′24″N 0°35′59″E		1122925	Upload Photo	Q26416031
19 and 21 (the Vine) St James Street	II	19 and 21 (the Vine), St James Street			15 October 1984	TL7862335578; 51°59′24″N 0°36′00″E		1338069	Upload Photo	Q26622416
Blue Boar House	II	24, St James Street			21 June 1962	TL7862435555; 51°59′23″N 0°36′00″E		1122929	Upload Photo	Q26416035
Saddlers	II	26, St James Street			21 June 1962	TL7863535556; 51°59′23″N 0°36′01″E		1338071	Upload Photo	Q26622418
Spencers	II	28, St James Street			15 October 1984	TL7866635559; 51°59′23″N 0°36′02″E		1306704	Upload Photo	Q26593453
Fishers	II	36, St James Street			21 June 1962	TL7868535566; 51°59′23″N 0°36′03″E		1122930	Upload Photo	Q26416036
The Old School House	II	38, St James Street			21 June 1962	TL7869635566; 51°59′23″N 0°36′04″E		1306711	Upload Photo	Q26593458
High House and the Trading Post	II	St James Street			21 June 1962	TL7852335533; 51°59′22″N 0°35′55″E		1122927	Upload Photo	Q26416033
Milepost Adjacent to North West Corner of Number 24	II	St James Street			15 October 1984	TL7861835557; 51°59′23″N 0°36′00″E		1306739	Upload Photo	Q26593483
Orbell House Post Office Residence	II	St James Street			21 June 1962	TL7854735541; 51°59′23″N 0°35′56″E		1338070	Upload Photo	Q26622417
Outbuilding to Rear of 5	II	St James Street			15 October 1984	TL7855035573; 51°59′24″N 0°35′56″E		1338067	Upload Photo	Q26622414
Post Office	II	St James Street			21 June 1962	TL7853835538; 51°59′23″N 0°35′56″E		1306756	Upload Photo	Q26593499
Telephone Kiosk	II	St James Street			24 February 1988	TL7856235566; 51°59′23″N 0°35′57″E		1276399	Upload Photo	Q26565915
The Bell Inn and Shop Adjoining to Left	II	St James Street	pub		21 June 1962	TL7856035545; 51°59′23″N 0°35′57″E		1169009	The Bell Inn and Shop Adjoining to Left More images	Q26462231
Pannels Ash Farm, Outbuilding Approximately 30 Metres North West of House	II	Outbuilding Approximately 30 Metres North West Of House, Sudbury Road			15 October 1984	TL8006236306; 51°59′46″N 0°37′17″E		1169123	Upload Photo	Q26462335
Pannels Ash Farm, Barn Approximately 35 Metres North West of House	II	Barn Approximately 35 Metres North West Of House, Sudbury Road			15 October 1984	TL8008436322; 51°59′46″N 0°37′18″E		1122933	Upload Photo	Q26416039
Little Lodge Farm, Barn Approximately 90 Metres North East of House and North West of Barn	II	Barn Approximately 90 Metres North East Of House And North West Of Barn, Sudbury Road			15 October 1984	TL7918235368; 51°59′16″N 0°36′29″E		1306689	Upload Photo	Q26593441
Little Lodge Farm, Barn Approx 100 Metres to North East of House	II	Barn Approx 100 Metres To North East Of House, Sudbury Road			15 October 1984	TL7921935363; 51°59′16″N 0°36′31″E		1122931	Upload Photo	Q26416037
Badgers and Camille Cottage	II	Sudbury Road			15 October 1984	TL7932635678; 51°59′26″N 0°36′37″E		1169114	Upload Photo	Q26462327
Little Lodge Farmhouse	II	Sudbury Road			21 June 1962	TL7914335294; 51°59′14″N 0°36′27″E		1169081	Upload Photo	Q26462296
Maple Croft	II	Sudbury Road			15 October 1984	TL7929235703; 51°59′27″N 0°36′35″E		1338073	Upload Photo	Q26622420
Milestone on South Verge Approximately 40 Metres West of Pannels Ash Farm	II	Sudbury Road			15 October 1984	TL7996636279; 51°59′45″N 0°37′12″E		1122932	Upload Photo	Q26416038
Pannels Ash Farmhouse	II	Sudbury Road			15 October 1984	TL8004036264; 51°59′44″N 0°37′16″E		1306695	Upload Photo	Q26593445
3, 5 and 7, Yeldham Road	II	3, 5 and 7, Yeldham Road, Crouch Green			15 October 1984	TL7757535480; 51°59′22″N 0°35′05″E		1338074	Upload Photo	Q26622421
Newmans Farmhouse	II	Yeldham Road			15 October 1984	TL7731936107; 51°59′42″N 0°34′53″E		1122934	Upload Photo	Q26416040

== See also ==
- Grade I listed buildings in Essex
- Grade II* listed buildings in Essex

== Sources ==
- Bettley, James; Pevsner, Nikolaus (2007) [1954], Essex, The Buildings of England, New Haven and London: Yale University Press, ISBN 978-0-300-11614-4
