= Listed buildings in Earls Colne =

Historic structures in Essex, England

Earls Colne is a village and civil parish in the Braintree District of Essex, England. It contains 93 listed buildings that are recorded in the National Heritage List for England. Of these one is grade I, one is grade II* and 91 are grade II.

This list is based on the information retrieved online from Historic England.

== Key ==
Grade	Criteria
I	Buildings that are of exceptional interest
II*	Particularly important buildings of more than special interest
II	Buildings that are of special interest

== Listing ==
Name	Grade	Location	Type	Completed (Note: The date given is the date used by Historic England as significant for the initial building or that of an important part in the structure's description.)	Date designated	Grid ref. (Note: The grid reference is based on the British national grid reference system, sometimes known as OSGB36, used by the Ordnance Survey.) Geo-coordinates	Notes	Entry number (Note: The "List Entry Number" is a unique number assigned to each listed building and scheduled monument by Historic England.)	Image	Wikidata
Earls Colne Quaker Meeting House	II	4 Burrows Road, CO6 2RZ			25 November 1983	TL8564129008; 51°55′43″N 0°41′55″E		1337916	Upload Photo	Q26622276
Cucumber Hall	II	Burnt House Road			10 April 1987	TL8724026603; 51°54′23″N 0°43′14″E		1306278	Upload Photo	Q26593073
Morlands	II	Burnt House Road			16 February 1987	TL8730026547; 51°54′21″N 0°43′17″E		1337915	Upload Photo	Q26622275
1 and 3, Burrows Road	II	1 and 3, Burrows Road			10 April 1987	TL8559528955; 51°55′41″N 0°41′52″E		1169975	Upload Photo	Q26463199
9 and 11, Burrows Road	II	9 and 11, Burrows Road			10 April 1987	TL8559828976; 51°55′42″N 0°41′53″E		1123251	Upload Photo	Q26416346
13 and 15, Burrows Road	II	13 and 15, Burrows Road			10 April 1987	TL8558328982; 51°55′42″N 0°41′52″E		1169979	Upload Photo	Q26463203
Barn 30 Metres South West of Gatehouse Farmhouse	II	Coggeshall Road			10 April 1987	TL8556926185; 51°54′12″N 0°41′46″E		1337917	Upload Photo	Q26622277
Barn 40 Metres East of Tilekiln Farmhouse	II	Coggeshall Road			10 April 1987	TL8629428161; 51°55′15″N 0°42′27″E		1123252	Upload Photo	Q26416347
Barn 40 Metres North East of Peartree Hall Farmhouse	II	Coggeshall Road			10 April 1987	TL8583527350; 51°54′49″N 0°42′02″E		1123255	Upload Photo	Q26416350
Broomfield Farmhouse	II	Coggeshall Road			10 April 1987	TL8560726743; 51°54′30″N 0°41′49″E		1123254	Upload Photo	Q26416349
Byre and Attached Walls 45 Metres South-east of Tilekiln Farmhouse	II	Coggeshall Road			10 April 1987	TL8628328144; 51°55′14″N 0°42′27″E		1306281	Upload Photo	Q26593076
Byre and Implement Shed 70 Metres South East of Tilekiln Farmhouse	II	Coggeshall Road			10 April 1987	TL8630028139; 51°55′14″N 0°42′28″E		1123253	Upload Photo	Q26416348
Cartlodge 80 Metres East North East of Peartree Hall Farmhouse	II	Coggeshall Road			10 April 1987	TL8589827330; 51°54′48″N 0°42′05″E		1306249	Upload Photo	Q26593049
Lime House	II	Coggeshall Road			10 April 1987	TL8602927682; 51°55′00″N 0°42′13″E		1169987	Upload Photo	Q26463214
Peartree Hall Farmhouse	II	Coggeshall Road			10 April 1987	TL8582027308; 51°54′48″N 0°42′01″E		1169991	Upload Photo	Q26463219
Railing and Gates Approximately 13 Metres West of Lime House	II	Coggeshall Road			10 April 1987	TL8600827687; 51°55′00″N 0°42′12″E		1337918	Upload Photo	Q26622278
Tilekiln Farmhouse	II	Coggeshall Road			10 April 1987	TL8624028177; 51°55′15″N 0°42′25″E		1169981	Upload Photo	Q26463205
Yard Walls 30 Metres South-east of Tilekiln Farmhouse	II	Coggeshall Road			10 April 1987	TL8625928145; 51°55′14″N 0°42′26″E		1169983	Upload Photo	Q26463207
Chalkney Mill	II	Colchester Road			27 October 1975	TL8752628386; 51°55′21″N 0°43′32″E		1337879	Upload Photo	Q26622241
Chalkney Mill House	II	Colchester Road	house		27 October 1975	TL8752628384; 51°55′21″N 0°43′32″E		1337938	Chalkney Mill House More images	Q26622295
6, Colne Green	II	6, Colne Green			10 April 1987	TL8547528921; 51°55′40″N 0°41′46″E		1123217	Upload Photo	Q26416311
7, Colne Green	II	7, Colne Green			10 April 1987	TL8546528922; 51°55′40″N 0°41′46″E		1337900	Upload Photo	Q26622262
9 and 10, Colne Green	II	9 and 10, Colne Green			10 April 1987	TL8545728925; 51°55′41″N 0°41′45″E		1123218	Upload Photo	Q26416312
Granary Approximately 10 Metres South East of Priory Farmhouse	II	Colne Green			10 April 1987	TL8552928970; 51°55′42″N 0°41′49″E		1337899	Upload Photo	Q26622261
Priory Farmhouse	II	Colne Green			10 April 1987	TL8551228982; 51°55′42″N 0°41′48″E		1123216	Upload Photo	Q26416310
South Lodge to Colne House	II	Colne Green			10 April 1987	TL8539229003; 51°55′43″N 0°41′42″E		1123215	Upload Photo	Q26416309
Rede Cottage	II	Curds Road			28 April 2006	TL8536727491; 51°54′54″N 0°41′38″E		1391650	Upload Photo	Q26671003
Boundary Wall to South,east and North East of Colne Priory	II*	East And North East Of Colne Priory, Lower Holt Street			21 June 1962	TL8654828807; 51°55′35″N 0°42′42″E		1123234	Upload Photo	Q17557288
Stable Range and Ancillary Buildings of Atlas Works	II	2 and 4, Foundry Lane			10 April 1987	TL8556028816; 51°55′37″N 0°41′50″E		1123223	Upload Photo	Q26416317
The Willows	II	3, Foundry Lane			10 April 1987	TL8558528878; 51°55′39″N 0°41′52″E		1123219	Upload Photo	Q26416313
Coombe Hay	II	7, Foundry Lane			10 April 1987	TL8558628830; 51°55′37″N 0°41′52″E		1123220	Upload Photo	Q26416314
Hibernia Cottages	II	13-35, Foundry Lane			13 May 1986	TL8557928775; 51°55′36″N 0°41′51″E		1123221	Upload Photo	Q26416315
Bellevue Cottages	II	37-55, Foundry Lane			13 May 1986	TL8557828730; 51°55′34″N 0°41′51″E		1123222	Upload Photo	Q26416316
Central Block of Atlas Works	II	Foundry Lane			10 April 1987	TL8545228846; 51°55′38″N 0°41′45″E		1170081	Upload Photo	Q26463357
Gas Lamp and Standard Approximately 18 Metres East of Central Block of Atlas Works	II	Foundry Lane			10 April 1987	TL8553928850; 51°55′38″N 0°41′49″E		1170129	Upload Photo	Q26463458
Thatched Cottages	II	1 and 2, Halstead Road			10 April 1987	TL8533529023; 51°55′44″N 0°41′39″E		1123224	Upload Photo	Q26416318
Telephone Kiosk	II	Halstead Road			24 February 1988	TL8547128982; 51°55′42″N 0°41′46″E		1123185	Upload Photo	Q26416278
1, High Street	II	1, High Street			10 April 1987	TL8557628960; 51°55′42″N 0°41′51″E		1306198	Upload Photo	Q26592999
3 and 5, High Street	II	3 and 5, High Street			10 April 1987	TL8558828952; 51°55′41″N 0°41′52″E		1337901	Upload Photo	Q26622263
The Manse	II	13, High Street			10 April 1987	TL8565728958; 51°55′41″N 0°41′56″E		1123225	Upload Photo	Q26416319
Spar Foodmarket	II	15, High Street			10 April 1987	TL8566928955; 51°55′41″N 0°41′56″E		1170159	Upload Photo	Q26463489
Oxford House	II	17 and 19, High Street			10 April 1987	TL8568428952; 51°55′41″N 0°41′57″E		1337902	Upload Photo	Q26622264
The Drum Public House	II	21, High Street			10 April 1987	TL8569228950; 51°55′41″N 0°41′58″E		1306171	Upload Photo	Q26592974
22, High Street	II	22, High Street			10 April 1987	TL8565928925; 51°55′40″N 0°41′56″E		1123230	Upload Photo	Q26416327
27 and 29, High Street	II	27 and 29, High Street			10 April 1987	TL8571028945; 51°55′41″N 0°41′58″E		1123226	Upload Photo	Q26416320
Part of Cooperative Supermarket	II	31, 33 and 35, High Street			26 April 1982	TL8571728942; 51°55′41″N 0°41′59″E		1306174	Upload Photo	Q26592977
Cooperative Supermarket	II	37, High Street			26 April 1982	TL8573328944; 51°55′41″N 0°42′00″E		1123227	Upload Photo	Q26416322
The Old Forge	II	39, High Street			18 December 1986	TL8574928929; 51°55′40″N 0°42′00″E		1337903	Upload Photo	Q26622265
67, High Street	II	67, High Street			10 April 1987	TL8587228894; 51°55′39″N 0°42′07″E		1170178	Upload Photo	Q26463509
Kj Morris	II	75, High Street			10 April 1987	TL8589228893; 51°55′39″N 0°42′08″E		1123228	Upload Photo	Q26416323
77, High Street	II	77, High Street	building		7 August 1952	TL8591028883; 51°55′39″N 0°42′09″E		1170187	77, High Street More images	Q26463516
78, High Street	II	78, High Street			10 April 1987	TL8585528871; 51°55′38″N 0°42′06″E		1170242	Upload Photo	Q26463571
79 and 81, High Street	II	79 and 81, High Street			21 June 1962	TL8592328880; 51°55′39″N 0°42′09″E		1337904	Upload Photo	Q26622266
82 and 84, High Street	II	82 and 84, High Street			10 April 1987	TL8586628870; 51°55′38″N 0°42′06″E		1123231	Upload Photo	Q26416328
83 and 85, High Street	II	83 and 85, High Street			21 June 1962	TL8593828873; 51°55′38″N 0°42′10″E		1306151	Upload Photo	Q26592956
Emson and Son	II	86, High Street			10 April 1987	TL8587028868; 51°55′38″N 0°42′07″E		1337906	Upload Photo	Q26622268
Cobblestones	II	93, High Street			10 April 1987	TL8599628864; 51°55′38″N 0°42′13″E		1123229	Upload Photo	Q26416324
94 and 96, High Street	II	94 and 96, High Street			21 June 1962	TL8589028863; 51°55′38″N 0°42′08″E		1170260	Upload Photo	Q26463584
97, High Street	II	97, High Street			23 January 1980	TL8605128902; 51°55′39″N 0°42′16″E		1170224	Upload Photo	Q26463552
98-104, High Street	II	98-104, High Street			21 June 1962	TL8590628858; 51°55′38″N 0°42′09″E		1123232	Upload Photo	Q26416329
Pandora	II	112, High Street			7 August 1952	TL8594428845; 51°55′37″N 0°42′11″E		1170272	Upload Photo	Q26463599
Twin Gables	II	122 and 124, High Street			21 June 1962	TL8597128833; 51°55′37″N 0°42′12″E		1123233	Upload Photo	Q26416330
130, High Street	II	130, High Street			10 April 1987	TL8599728831; 51°55′37″N 0°42′13″E		1170282	Upload Photo	Q26463613
Milepost Outside Colne Place	II	High Street			14 February 1994	TL8603428855; 51°55′38″N 0°42′15″E		1329386	Upload Photo	Q26614671
Parish Church of St Andrew	I	High Street	church building		21 June 1962	TL8606628826; 51°55′37″N 0°42′17″E		1337907	Parish Church of St Andrew More images	Q17536240
The Lion Public House	II	High Street	pub		7 August 1952	TL8563528956; 51°55′41″N 0°41′55″E		1306203	The Lion Public House More images	Q26593004
Dynes Cottage	II	2, Lower Holt Street			21 June 1962	TL8645028718; 51°55′33″N 0°42′37″E		1337908	Upload Photo	Q26622269
Spoutwell House	II	4, Lower Holt Street			21 June 1962	TL8646328705; 51°55′32″N 0°42′37″E		1306093	Upload Photo	Q26592903
8 and 10, Lower Holt Street	II	8 and 10, Lower Holt Street			21 June 1962	TL8649928743; 51°55′33″N 0°42′39″E		1123235	Upload Photo	Q26416331
Whiteoaks	II	14, Lower Holt Street			21 June 1962	TL8652128764; 51°55′34″N 0°42′41″E		1337927	Upload Photo	Q26622285
20, Lower Holt Street	II	20, Lower Holt Street			21 June 1962	TL8653928775; 51°55′34″N 0°42′41″E		1123194	Upload Photo	Q26416286
22-26, Lower Holt Street	II	22-26, Lower Holt Street			21 June 1962	TL8655228784; 51°55′35″N 0°42′42″E		1123195	Upload Photo	Q26416287
Mulberry Close	II	28, Lower Holt Street			21 June 1962	TL8659628831; 51°55′36″N 0°42′45″E		1337928	Upload Photo	Q26622286
Colne Priory	II	Lower Holt Street			7 August 1952	TL8646028835; 51°55′36″N 0°42′37″E		1306123	Colne Priory	Q85103169
River House	II	Lower Holt Street			10 April 1987	TL8655228950; 51°55′40″N 0°42′43″E		1170330	Upload Photo	Q26463716
Barn 70 Metres North North East of Nightingale Hall	II	Newhouse Road			26 May 1981	TL8380428068; 51°55′15″N 0°40′17″E		1123197	Upload Photo	Q26416289
Barn 90 Metres North West of Lodge Farmhouse	II	Newhouse Road			10 April 1987	TL8379227429; 51°54′54″N 0°40′15″E		1123199	Upload Photo	Q26416291
Lodge Farmhouse	II	Newhouse Road			25 November 1983	TL8380227401; 51°54′53″N 0°40′16″E		1123198	Upload Photo	Q26416290
Nightingale Cottage	II	Newhouse Road			10 April 1987	TL8374528098; 51°55′16″N 0°40′14″E		1123196	Upload Photo	Q26416288
Nightingale Hall	II	Newhouse Road			10 April 1987	TL8383127998; 51°55′13″N 0°40′18″E		1337929	Upload Photo	Q26622287
Colne House	II	Station Road			20 January 1986	TL8524129242; 51°55′51″N 0°41′35″E		1123200	Upload Photo	Q26416292
Post Office,sweet Shop and Video Library	II	Sweet Shop And Video Library, 72-76, High Street			10 April 1987	TL8583228878; 51°55′39″N 0°42′05″E		1337905	Upload Photo	Q26622267
Ranelagh Cottage	II	43, Tey Road			10 April 1987	TL8666528548; 51°55′27″N 0°42′48″E		1123201	Upload Photo	Q26416293
Holmwood Farmhouse	II	Tey Road			10 April 1987	TL8699627402; 51°54′49″N 0°43′03″E		1366156	Upload Photo	Q26647782
5, Upper Holt Street	II	5, Upper Holt Street			10 April 1987	TL8626128642; 51°55′30″N 0°42′27″E		1123202	Upload Photo	Q26416294
Boxtedds	II	9, Upper Holt Street			21 June 1962	TL8629628662; 51°55′31″N 0°42′29″E		1306071	Upload Photo	Q26592882
Elm House	II	14, Upper Holt Street			10 April 1987	TL8627628614; 51°55′30″N 0°42′27″E		1306079	Upload Photo	Q26592890
Priory Cottage	II	35, Upper Holt Street			21 June 1962	TL8642728759; 51°55′34″N 0°42′36″E		1306077	Upload Photo	Q26592888
Chandlers	II	Upper Holt Street			10 April 1987	TL8634328651; 51°55′31″N 0°42′31″E		1123204	Upload Photo	Q26416296
Houses 5 Metres South of Number 19 (garage)	II	Upper Holt Street			18 June 1985	TL8633828687; 51°55′32″N 0°42′31″E		1123203	Upload Photo	Q26416295
Pump on Triangular Green at the Junction with Coggeshall Road	II	Upper Holt Street			10 April 1987	TL8621528598; 51°55′29″N 0°42′24″E		1337930	Upload Photo	Q26622288
The Coachman Inn	II	Upper Holt Street			21 June 1962	TL8643128726; 51°55′33″N 0°42′36″E		1337931	Upload Photo	Q26622289
The Institute, 28-46 High Street, and 2 York Road	II	2, York Road			5 February 1986	TL8570328917; 51°55′40″N 0°41′58″E		1170231	Upload Photo	Q26463559

== See also ==
- Grade I listed buildings in Essex
- Grade II* listed buildings in Essex

== Sources ==
- Bettley, James; Pevsner, Nikolaus (2007) [1954], Essex, The Buildings of England, New Haven and London: Yale University Press, ISBN 978-0-300-11614-4
