= Listed buildings in Wethersfield, Essex =

Civil Parish in Essex, England

Wethersfield is a village and civil parish in the Braintree District of Essex, England. It contains 117 listed buildings that are recorded in the National Heritage List for England. Of these one is grade I, ten are grade II* and 106 are grade II.

This list is based on the information retrieved online from Historic England.

== Key ==
Grade	Criteria
I	Buildings that are of exceptional interest
II*	Particularly important buildings of more than special interest
II	Buildings that are of special interest

== Listing ==
Name	Grade	Location	Type	Completed (Note: The date given is the date used by Historic England as significant for the initial building or that of an important part in the structure's description.)	Date designated	Grid ref. (Note: The grid reference is based on the British national grid reference system, sometimes known as OSGB36, used by the Ordnance Survey.) Geo-coordinates	Notes	Entry number (Note: The "List Entry Number" is a unique number assigned to each listed building and scheduled monument by Historic England.)	Image	Wikidata
September Cottage	II				16 October 1981	TL7453231222; 51°57′08″N 0°32′18″E		1123349	Upload Photo	Q26416455
Baker's Farmhouse	II	Baker's Farm Lane			19 March 1986	TL7519330864; 51°56′55″N 0°32′52″E		1307146	Upload Photo	Q26593847
Readings Farmhouse	II	Baker's Farm Lane			17 March 1982	TL7494631366; 51°57′12″N 0°32′40″E		1123350	Upload Photo	Q26416456
Barn Approximately 25 Metres South East of Owl's Hall Farmhouse	II	Blackmore End Road			19 March 1986	TL7382630668; 51°56′50″N 0°31′40″E		1123353	Upload Photo	Q26416459
Barn Approximately 7 Metres East of the Red Cow Public House	II	Blackmore End Road			19 March 1986	TL7384830971; 51°57′00″N 0°31′42″E		1123355	Upload Photo	Q26416461
Clevelands	II	Blackmore End Road			19 March 1986	TL7408030818; 51°56′55″N 0°31′54″E		1168220	Upload Photo	Q26493704
Elms Farmhouse	II	Blackmore End Road			19 March 1986	TL7347331159; 51°57′07″N 0°31′22″E		1123354	Upload Photo	Q26416460
Frostnails	II	Blackmore End Road			19 March 1986	TL7381830947; 51°56′59″N 0°31′40″E		1123351	Upload Photo	Q26416457
Glenwood Cottage	II	Blackmore End Road			19 March 1986	TL7418830453; 51°56′43″N 0°31′59″E		1337846	Upload Photo	Q26622214
Hill House	II	Blackmore End Road			19 March 1986	TL7388930834; 51°56′56″N 0°31′44″E		1123352	Upload Photo	Q26416458
Hillside	II	Blackmore End Road			18 May 1978	TL7378630948; 51°57′00″N 0°31′38″E		1168151	Upload Photo	Q26493639
Mission Cottage	II	Blackmore End Road			19 March 1986	TL7384430915; 51°56′58″N 0°31′41″E		1168159	Upload Photo	Q26493646
Owl's Hall Farmhouse	II	Blackmore End Road			19 March 1986	TL7379030693; 51°56′51″N 0°31′38″E		1168172	Upload Photo	Q26493659
Pouches Thatch	II	Blackmore End Road			19 March 1986	TL7295131574; 51°57′21″N 0°30′56″E		1307133	Upload Photo	Q26593835
The Bull Public House	II	Blackmore End Road			21 October 1982	TL7372030993; 51°57′01″N 0°31′35″E		1168211	Upload Photo	Q26493695
The Red Cow Public House	II	Blackmore End Road			19 March 1986	TL7382730977; 51°57′00″N 0°31′41″E		1337847	Upload Photo	Q26622215
The Thatched Cottage	II	Blackmore End Road			19 March 1986	TL7398330723; 51°56′52″N 0°31′48″E		1168190	Upload Photo	Q26493676
1 and 2 Cherry Gardens	II	1 and 2 Cherry Gardens, Braintree Road			19 March 1986	TL7212529802; 51°56′24″N 0°30′09″E		1168287	Upload Photo	Q26461551
Ancillary Building Approximately 6 Metres South of Russell's Farmhouse	II	Braintree Road			19 March 1986	TL7126530927; 51°57′02″N 0°29′26″E		1123357	Upload Photo	Q26416462
Barn Approximately 12 Metres South West of Russell's Farmhouse	II	Braintree Road			19 March 1986	TL7123430922; 51°57′02″N 0°29′25″E		1337849	Upload Photo	Q26622217
Barn Approximately 15 Metres South East of Golden's Farmhouse	II	Braintree Road			23 April 1985	TL7167330469; 51°56′46″N 0°29′47″E		1337850	Upload Photo	Q26622218
Barn Approximately 8 Metres South of Russell's Farmhouse	II	Braintree Road			19 March 1986	TL7127230920; 51°57′01″N 0°29′27″E		1168248	Upload Photo	Q26461515
Boydell's Farmhouse	II*	Braintree Road			2 May 1953	TL7215129897; 51°56′27″N 0°30′11″E		1337870	Upload Photo	Q17557865
Brook Farmhouse	II	Braintree Road			21 December 1967	TL7135430906; 51°57′01″N 0°29′31″E		1123361	Upload Photo	Q26416466
Brookside Cottage	II	Braintree Road			21 December 1967	TL7130330916; 51°57′01″N 0°29′28″E		1307078	Upload Photo	Q26593785
Edgebrook and Rosamond	II	Braintree Road			19 March 1986	TL7169630486; 51°56′47″N 0°29′48″E		1307092	Upload Photo	Q26593797
Fir Cottage	II	Braintree Road			19 March 1986	TL7190530372; 51°56′43″N 0°29′59″E		1168308	Upload Photo	Q26461569
Golden's Farmhouse	II	Braintree Road			19 March 1986	TL7165930494; 51°56′47″N 0°29′46″E		1168278	Upload Photo	Q26461542
House Approximately 70 Metres South South East of Boydell's Farmhouse	II	Braintree Road, Cherry Gardens			19 March 1986	TL7216929826; 51°56′25″N 0°30′12″E		1123322	Upload Photo	Q26416421
Mansard Cottage	II	Braintree Road			19 March 1986	TL7211229793; 51°56′24″N 0°30′09″E		1337851	Upload Photo	Q26622219
Martin's Nest	II	Braintree Road			19 March 1986	TL7211729926; 51°56′28″N 0°30′09″E		1123321	Upload Photo	Q26416420
Number 1 Sim's Cottage	II	Braintree Road			21 December 1967	TL7121530994; 51°57′04″N 0°29′24″E		1307106	Upload Photo	Q26593810
Number 3 Brook Cottages	II	Braintree Road			19 March 1986	TL7171130483; 51°56′47″N 0°29′49″E		1123360	Upload Photo	Q26416465
Numbers 1-4 Simm's Farmhouse	II*	Braintree Road			21 December 1967	TL7121231002; 51°57′04″N 0°29′24″E		1123356	Upload Photo	Q17557304
Russell's Farmhouse	II	Braintree Road			21 December 1967	TL7127030945; 51°57′02″N 0°29′27″E		1337848	Upload Photo	Q26622216
Stable Block Approximately 9 Metres South East of Russell's Farmhouse	II	Braintree Road			19 March 1986	TL7129230925; 51°57′02″N 0°29′28″E		1307111	Upload Photo	Q26593814
Stables Cottage	II	Braintree Road			21 December 1967	TL7132630863; 51°57′00″N 0°29′30″E		1123358	Upload Photo	Q26416463
Timbers	II	Braintree Road			21 December 1967	TL7210229943; 51°56′29″N 0°30′09″E		1123362	Upload Photo	Q26416467
Wethersfield Mill	II	Braintree Road			8 June 1978	TL7202629585; 51°56′17″N 0°30′04″E		1168295	Upload Photo	Q26461558
Wethersfield Mill House Including Front Garden Area Railings and Gate	II	Braintree Road			22 March 1993	TL7203029607; 51°56′18″N 0°30′04″E		1236718	Upload Photo	Q26529926
Wethersfield Place (six Apples)	II	Braintree Road			19 March 1986	TL7141830813; 51°56′58″N 0°29′34″E		1123359	Upload Photo	Q26416464
Brickkiln Cottage	II	Brick Kiln Green			19 March 1986	TL7352331615; 51°57′21″N 0°31′26″E		1123323	Upload Photo	Q26416422
Little Thatch	II	Brick Kiln Green			19 March 1986	TL7352631638; 51°57′22″N 0°31′26″E		1123324	Upload Photo	Q26416423
Littleacres	II*	Brick Kiln Green			19 March 1986	TL7358231571; 51°57′20″N 0°31′29″E		1337872	Upload Photo	Q17557868
The Old Cottage	II	Brick Kiln Green			19 March 1986	TL7351131579; 51°57′20″N 0°31′25″E		1337871	Upload Photo	Q26622236
Stables, Coach House, Barn and Mill House Studio Adjoining North West of Wethersfield Mill House	II	Coach House, Barn And Mill House Studio Adjoining North West Of Wethersfield Mill House, Braintree Road			22 March 1993	TL7200929603; 51°56′18″N 0°30′03″E		1140094	Upload Photo	Q26432891
Codham Little Park Farmhouse	II	Codham Little Park Drive			21 February 1984	TL7381528945; 51°55′55″N 0°31′36″E		1123328	Upload Photo	Q26416427
Maltings Approximately 40 Metres South West of Codham Little Park Farmhouse	II	Codham Little Park Drive			21 February 1984	TL7378828905; 51°55′53″N 0°31′35″E		1168421	Upload Photo	Q26461672
Barn Approximately 50 Metres North West of Great Codham Hall	II	Codham's Lane			19 March 1986	TL7378028083; 51°55′27″N 0°31′33″E		1307030	Upload Photo	Q26593743
Chapel Cottage	II	Codham's Lane			21 December 1967	TL7380728200; 51°55′31″N 0°31′35″E		1306998	Upload Photo	Q26684267
Codham Mill and Mill House	II*	Codham's Lane	mill building		2 May 1953	TL7353628169; 51°55′30″N 0°31′20″E		1123325	Codham Mill and Mill House More images	Q26263433
Dovecote Approximately 30 Metres West of Great Codham Hall	II	Codham's Lane			21 December 1967	TL7379228042; 51°55′26″N 0°31′33″E		1123326	Upload Photo	Q26416424
Great Codham Hall	II*	Codham's Lane			21 December 1967	TL7382528058; 51°55′26″N 0°31′35″E		1337873	Upload Photo	Q17557876
Little Codham Hall	II	Codham's Lane			2 May 1953	TL7379028170; 51°55′30″N 0°31′34″E		1123327	Upload Photo	Q26416425
The Cottage	II	Dog Lane, Dogchase			23 February 1981	TL7122831351; 51°57′15″N 0°29′25″E		1123329	Upload Photo	Q26416428
Ancillary Building 8 Metres North of Danes Vale Farmhouse	II	Gosfield Road			19 March 1986	TL7259430231; 51°56′38″N 0°30′35″E		1123331	Upload Photo	Q26416433
Barn Approximately 20 Metres North East of Summers Hall Farmhouse	II	Gosfield Road			19 March 1986	TL7411030305; 51°56′38″N 0°31′54″E		1123333	Upload Photo	Q26416436
Barn Approximately Metres North of Sloman's Farmhouse	II	Gosfield Road			19 March 1986	TL7375030310; 51°56′39″N 0°31′35″E		1337874	Upload Photo	Q26622237
Danes Vale Farmhouse	II	Gosfield Road			19 March 1986	TL7258730212; 51°56′37″N 0°30′34″E		1168445	Upload Photo	Q26461693
High Thatch	II	Gosfield Road			19 March 1986	TL7377130346; 51°56′40″N 0°31′37″E		1123332	Upload Photo	Q26416434
Summers Hall Farmhouse	II	Gosfield Road			19 March 1986	TL7409030283; 51°56′38″N 0°31′53″E		1306960	Upload Photo	Q26593680
The Old Granary	II	Gosfield Road			22 May 1984	TL7366130267; 51°56′38″N 0°31′31″E		1168482	Upload Photo	Q26461732
Tinkers Cross	II	Gosfield Road			19 March 1986	TL7230530344; 51°56′42″N 0°30′20″E		1123330	Upload Photo	Q26416430
Gray's Farmhouse	II	Grays Lane			16 December 1982	TL7206732132; 51°57′40″N 0°30′11″E		1337875	Upload Photo	Q26622238
Grays Lane Cottage	II	Grays Lane			19 March 1986	TL7209031897; 51°57′32″N 0°30′11″E		1168502	Upload Photo	Q26461750
Blenheim House	II	High Street			19 March 1986	TL7127731334; 51°57′15″N 0°29′28″E		1123340	Upload Photo	Q26416446
Briar Cottage	II	High Street			19 March 1986	TL7133131381; 51°57′16″N 0°29′31″E		1168699	Upload Photo	Q26461940
Chase House	II	High Street, CM7 4BY			19 March 1986	TL7124231313; 51°57′14″N 0°29′26″E		1337840	Upload Photo	Q26622208
Church Hill House	II	High Street			21 December 1967	TL7120031297; 51°57′14″N 0°29′24″E		1168634	Upload Photo	Q26461879
K6 Telephone Kiosk to North of Ivanhoe House	II	High Street			13 March 1989	TL7117931257; 51°57′12″N 0°29′23″E		1329385	Upload Photo	Q26614670
Numbers 3 and 4 (churchyard Cottage), Post Office Cottages	II	High Street			17 August 1979	TL7121831282; 51°57′13″N 0°29′25″E		1123299	Upload Photo	Q26416397
Parish Church of St Mary Magdalene	I	High Street	church building		21 December 1967	TL7122131250; 51°57′12″N 0°29′25″E		1337860	Parish Church of St Mary Magdalene More images	Q17536223
Smithy Cottage	II	High Street			19 March 1986	TL7126131298; 51°57′14″N 0°29′27″E		1337841	Upload Photo	Q26622209
St George's House	II*	High Street			21 December 1967	TL7117731286; 51°57′13″N 0°29′23″E		1337878	Upload Photo	Q17557878
The Bakery and Burleigh Cottage	II	High Street			21 December 1967	TL7122631304; 51°57′14″N 0°29′25″E		1168649	Upload Photo	Q26461893
The Hoods	II	High Street			21 December 1967	TL7121431302; 51°57′14″N 0°29′24″E		1123339	Upload Photo	Q26416444
Trodd's Garage (john Pease Motors)	II	High Street			21 December 1967	TL7118831290; 51°57′14″N 0°29′23″E		1123338	Upload Photo	Q26416443
Virgina House and the Stores	II	High Street			24 June 1983	TL7125531325; 51°57′15″N 0°29′27″E		1168689	Upload Photo	Q26461931
Barn 35 Metres North North West of Number 1 Upper Barns	II	Hudson's Hill			19 March 1986	TL7146831476; 51°57′19″N 0°29′38″E		1123300	Upload Photo	Q26416398
Brand's Farmhouse	II	Hudson's Hill			19 March 1986	TL7227831676; 51°57′25″N 0°30′21″E		1123301	Upload Photo	Q26416399
Byre Approximately 15 Metres South South West of Hyde Farmhouse	II	Hyde Lane			22 May 1984	TL7373830220; 51°56′36″N 0°31′35″E		1123302	Upload Photo	Q26416400
Cart Lodge Approximately 35 Metres South South West of Hyde Farmhouse	II	Hyde Lane			22 May 1984	TL7373430206; 51°56′36″N 0°31′34″E		1337862	Upload Photo	Q26622229
Hyde Farmhouse	II	Hyde Lane			22 May 1984	TL7374830250; 51°56′37″N 0°31′35″E		1337861	Upload Photo	Q26622228
Stable Range Approximately 20 Metres South West of Hyde Farmhouse	II	Hyde Lane			22 May 1984	TL7372730226; 51°56′36″N 0°31′34″E		1123303	Upload Photo	Q26416401
Moneyfields	II	Lovers Lane			24 June 1983	TL7221030257; 51°56′39″N 0°30′15″E		1123304	Upload Photo	Q26416402
Barn Approximately 30 Metres North of Lealands Farmhouse	II	Lower Green Road			19 March 1986	TL7396731172; 51°57′07″N 0°31′48″E		1306807	Upload Photo	Q26593541
Lealands Farmhouse	II	Lower Green Road			19 March 1986	TL7397331134; 51°57′05″N 0°31′49″E		1123307	Upload Photo	Q26416405
Old Timbers	II	Lower Green Road			19 March 1986	TL7377331504; 51°57′18″N 0°31′39″E		1306825	Upload Photo	Q26593559
The Round House	II	Lower Green Road			12 April 1985	TL7386331437; 51°57′15″N 0°31′43″E		1123306	Upload Photo	Q26416404
The Smithy	II	Lower Green Road			19 March 1986	TL7387830986; 51°57′01″N 0°31′43″E		1123305	Upload Photo	Q26416403
Wright's Farmhouse	II*	Lower Green Road			18 May 1978	TL7393131278; 51°57′10″N 0°31′47″E		1168807	Upload Photo	Q17557528
Barn Approximately 40 Metres South East of Valley Farmhouse	II	Oak Hill			19 March 1986	TL7293029771; 51°56′22″N 0°30′52″E		1123309	Upload Photo	Q26416406
Barn Approximately 50 Metres South of Valley Farmhouse	II	Oak Hill			19 March 1986	TL7290929755; 51°56′22″N 0°30′50″E		1306815	Upload Photo	Q26593549
Valley Farmhouse	II*	Oak Hill			21 December 1967	TL7289329807; 51°56′24″N 0°30′50″E		1123308	Upload Photo	Q17557294
Fisher's Farmhouse	II	Parkhall Road, Beazley End			19 March 1986	TL7449028989; 51°55′55″N 0°32′12″E		1168930	Upload Photo	Q26462155
Northys	II	Parkhall Road, Beazley End			16 October 1981	TL7430728978; 51°55′55″N 0°32′02″E		1123310	Upload Photo	Q26416407
Pump at Rear of Fisher's Farmhouse	II	Parkhall Road, Beazley End			19 March 1986	TL7448428990; 51°55′55″N 0°32′11″E		1123311	Upload Photo	Q26416408
Numbers 1 and 2 (sparrows), Post Office Cottages	II	Post Office Cottages, High Street			17 August 1979	TL7123431288; 51°57′13″N 0°29′26″E		1168712	Upload Photo	Q26461952
Bakehouse Approximately 5 Metres West of the Priest House	II	Rotten End			19 March 1986	TL7302629353; 51°56′09″N 0°30′56″E		1169006	Upload Photo	Q26462228
Gold Rill and Rotten End Farmhouse	II	Rotten End			21 December 1967	TL7301729400; 51°56′10″N 0°30′55″E		1168982	Upload Photo	Q26462204
Granary Approximately 5 Metres East of Spice's Farmhouse	II	Rotten End			21 December 1967	TL7309829499; 51°56′13″N 0°31′00″E		1337863	Upload Photo	Q26622230
Spice's Farmhouse	II*	Rotten End			21 December 1967	TL7308429493; 51°56′13″N 0°30′59″E		1306774	Upload Photo	Q17557749
The Priest House	II*	Rotten End	house		21 December 1967	TL7303429348; 51°56′09″N 0°30′56″E		1123312	The Priest House More images	Q17557298
The Gables	II	Silver Street			19 March 1986	TL7106031287; 51°57′14″N 0°29′16″E		1337864	Upload Photo	Q26622231
Brick House and Lysvean	II	The Green			21 December 1967	TL7116131280; 51°57′13″N 0°29′22″E		1306955	Upload Photo	Q26593677
Castle House (the Spinning Wheel)	II	The Green			21 December 1967	TL7110831282; 51°57′13″N 0°29′19″E		1168521	Upload Photo	Q26461770
Chapel Cottage	II	The Green			21 December 1967	TL7111731278; 51°57′13″N 0°29′19″E		1123334	Upload Photo	Q26416438
Cottage Approximately 30 Metres North North West of Lysvean	II	The Green			19 March 1986	TL7115231315; 51°57′14″N 0°29′21″E		1337877	Upload Photo	Q26622240
House on the Corner of the Green and Silver Street	II	The Green			21 December 1967	TL7110231260; 51°57′13″N 0°29′19″E		1168614	Upload Photo	Q26461859
Ivanhoe House	II	The Green			21 December 1967	TL7117531235; 51°57′12″N 0°29′22″E		1306920	Upload Photo	Q26593644
Mausoleum Approximately 20 Metres East of United Reformed Church	II	The Green			19 March 1986	TL7114831319; 51°57′14″N 0°29′21″E		1306940	Upload Photo	Q26593664
Railings Approximately 37 Metres South South East of United Reformed Church	II	The Green			19 March 1986	TL7113331274; 51°57′13″N 0°29′20″E		1123335	Upload Photo	Q26416439
Railings and Gateway Approximately 7 Metres South of the Manse	II	The Green			19 March 1986	TL7114031274; 51°57′13″N 0°29′21″E		1123336	Upload Photo	Q26416440
Rudi's Restaurant	II	The Green			19 March 1986	TL7111031250; 51°57′12″N 0°29′19″E		1123337	Upload Photo	Q26416442
The Manse	II	The Green			21 December 1967	TL7114131284; 51°57′13″N 0°29′21″E		1168561	Upload Photo	Q26461809
United Reformed Church	II	The Green			19 March 1986	TL7111731320; 51°57′15″N 0°29′19″E		1337876	Upload Photo	Q26622239
White Hall Farmhouse	II	Toppesfield Road			19 March 1986	TL7297532748; 51°57′59″N 0°30′59″E		1123313	Upload Photo	Q26416411

== See also ==
- Grade I listed buildings in Essex
- Grade II* listed buildings in Essex

== Sources ==
- Bettley, James; Pevsner, Nikolaus (2007) [1954], Essex, The Buildings of England, New Haven and London: Yale University Press, ISBN 978-0-300-11614-4
