= Listed buildings in Finchingfield =

Historic structures in Essex, England

Finchingfield is a village and civil parish in the Braintree District of Essex, England. It contains 101 listed buildings that are recorded in the National Heritage List for England. Of these three are grade I, two are grade II* and 105 are grade II.

This list is based on the information retrieved online from Historic England.

== Key ==
Grade	Criteria
I	Buildings that are of exceptional interest
II*	Particularly important buildings of more than special interest
II	Buildings that are of special interest

== Listing ==
Name	Grade	Location	Type	Completed (Note: The date given is the date used by Historic England as significant for the initial building or that of an important part in the structure's description.)	Date designated	Grid ref. (Note: The grid reference is based on the British national grid reference system, sometimes known as OSGB36, used by the Ordnance Survey.) Geo-coordinates	Notes	Entry number (Note: The "List Entry Number" is a unique number assigned to each listed building and scheduled monument by Historic England.)	Image	Wikidata
Cold War Nuclear Bomb Stores and Sidewinder Air-to-air Missile Store, Along with Associated Blast Walls, at Former Raf Wethersfield	II	Along With Associated Blast Walls, At Former Raf Wethersfield, Wethersfield, CM7 4AZ			8 August 2023	TL7229434332; 51°58′51″N 0°30′26″E		1485837	Upload Photo	Q126688915
Champions Farmhouse	II	Bardfield Road			17 May 1985	TL6849931268; 51°57′16″N 0°27′02″E		1122717	Upload Photo	Q26415834
Pump Approximately 4 Metres West of Champions Farmhouse	II	Bardfield Road			17 May 1985	TL6850831262; 51°57′16″N 0°27′03″E		1122718	Upload Photo	Q26415835
Brent Hall	II	Brent Hall Road			2 May 1953	TL6756633105; 51°58′16″N 0°26′17″E		1122720	Upload Photo	Q26415837
Garlands Cottage	II	Brent Hall Road			17 May 1985	TL6687033214; 51°58′20″N 0°25′40″E		1122719	Upload Photo	Q26415836
Granary Approximately 10 Metres North of Brent Hall	II	Brent Hall Road			17 May 1985	TL6757233129; 51°58′17″N 0°26′17″E		1122722	Upload Photo	Q26415839
Wall Approximately 3 Metres West of Brent Hall	II	Brent Hall Road			17 May 1985	TL6754433095; 51°58′16″N 0°26′16″E		1122721	Upload Photo	Q26415838
Number 2, Brook Cottage and Adjacent to Cottage to North	II	Brook Cottage And Adjacent Cottage To North, Vicarage Road			17 May 1985	TL6873132716; 51°58′02″N 0°27′17″E		1337797	Upload Photo	Q26622174
1 and 2 Hillside	II	1 and 2 Hillside, Church Hill			4 February 1992	TL6866732830; 51°58′06″N 0°27′14″E		1217002	Upload Photo	Q26511744
Bits and Pieces	II	Church Hill			17 May 1985	TL6858132838; 51°58′06″N 0°27′09″E		1122727	Upload Photo	Q26415843
Chestnut Villa	II	Church Hill, CM7 4NP			17 May 1985	TL6862332857; 51°58′07″N 0°27′12″E		1338174	Upload Photo	Q26622522
Parish Church of St John the Baptist	I	Church Hill	church building		21 December 1967	TL6862432806; 51°58′05″N 0°27′12″E		1122729	Parish Church of St John the Baptist More images	Q17535802
Stowes and Mildmay	II	Church Hill			21 December 1967	TL6853032796; 51°58′05″N 0°27′07″E		1122728	Upload Photo	Q26415845
The Guildhall	I	Church Hill	guild house		21 December 1967	TL6857432816; 51°58′06″N 0°27′09″E		1115594	The Guildhall More images	Q17535748
The Old Smithy	II	Church Hill, CM7 4NP			17 May 1985	TL6863232865; 51°58′07″N 0°27′12″E		1320335	Upload Photo	Q26606345
The Red Lion Inn	II	Church Hill	pub		2 May 1953	TL6856132822; 51°58′06″N 0°27′08″E		1115632	The Red Lion Inn More images	Q26409333
Town House	II	Church Hill			21 December 1967	TL6859132842; 51°58′07″N 0°27′10″E		1115636	Upload Photo	Q26409337
Barn Approximately 50 Metres South West of Lopham's Farmhouse	II	Cornish Hall End			17 May 1985	TL6855437380; 52°00′33″N 0°27′16″E		1115551	Upload Photo	Q26409266
Cornish Hall Farmhouse	II	Cornish Hall End			2 May 1953	TL6841635709; 51°59′39″N 0°27′06″E		1338175	Upload Photo	Q26622523
Shore Hall	II	Cornish Hall End			9 March 1993	TL6709436887; 52°00′19″N 0°25′59″E		1217001	Upload Photo	Q26511743
White House Farmhouse	II	Cornish Hall End			21 December 1967	TL6827636615; 52°00′09″N 0°27′00″E		1115577	Upload Photo	Q26409284
Daw Street Farmhouse	II	Daw Street			21 December 1967	TL6925631734; 51°57′30″N 0°27′43″E		1122730	Upload Photo	Q26415846
1 and 2 Primrose Cottages	II	1 and 2 Primrose Cottages, Duck End			21 December 1967	TL6859133074; 51°58′14″N 0°27′10″E		1122732	Upload Photo	Q26415848
1 and 3, Duck End	II	1 and 3, Duck End			21 December 1967	TL6849832986; 51°58′11″N 0°27′05″E		1338176	Upload Photo	Q26622524
5, Duck End	II	5, Duck End			14 October 1983	TL6851232993; 51°58′12″N 0°27′06″E		1115557	Upload Photo	Q26409270
Brook House	II	Duck End			21 December 1967	TL6860133044; 51°58′13″N 0°27′11″E		1338159	Upload Photo	Q26622506
Old Mill Cottage	II	Duck End			21 December 1967	TL6853532986; 51°58′11″N 0°27′07″E		1338158	Upload Photo	Q26622505
Paigles and the Cottage	II	Duck End			21 December 1967	TL6856433007; 51°58′12″N 0°27′09″E		1122694	Upload Photo	Q26415811
Riverside	II	Duck End			21 December 1967	TL6853733023; 51°58′12″N 0°27′07″E		1122731	Upload Photo	Q26415847
Rose Cottage and Corner Cottage	II	Duck End			21 December 1967	TL6855033029; 51°58′13″N 0°27′08″E		1115563	Upload Photo	Q26409272
Rosemary Cottage	II	Duck End			21 December 1967	TL6852832982; 51°58′11″N 0°27′07″E		1115534	Upload Photo	Q26409252
Thatchers and Harvest Cottage	II	Duck End			21 December 1967	TL6860533083; 51°58′14″N 0°27′11″E		1115530	Upload Photo	Q26409248
The Round House	II	Duck End			17 May 1985	TL6874433369; 51°58′23″N 0°27′19″E		1338137	Upload Photo	Q26622484
The Windmill	II	Duck End	post mill		2 May 1953	TL6854732974; 51°58′11″N 0°27′08″E		1122733	The Windmill More images	Q5311446
Ancillary Building Approximately 15 Metres South of the Barretts	II	Howe Street			17 May 1985	TL6975534557; 51°59′01″N 0°28′14″E		1115422	Upload Photo	Q26409156
Belbyne Cottage	II	Howe Street			17 May 1985	TL6938634338; 51°58′54″N 0°27′54″E		1115430	Upload Photo	Q26409162
Ben Fosters	II	Howe Street			17 May 1985	TL7023336026; 51°59′48″N 0°28′42″E		1338160	Upload Photo	Q26622507
Coleman's Farmhouse	II	Howe Street			17 May 1985	TL7003834669; 51°59′04″N 0°28′29″E		1122707	Upload Photo	Q26415824
Dovehouse at Obourne's Farm	II	Howe Street			17 May 1985	TL6933234588; 51°59′02″N 0°27′52″E		1122705	Upload Photo	Q26415822
Howe Hall	II	Howe Street			16 July 1984	TL6912033766; 51°58′36″N 0°27′39″E		1115402	Upload Photo	Q26409140
Jummar	II	Howe Street			17 May 1985	TL6991334633; 51°59′03″N 0°28′22″E		1122704	Upload Photo	Q26415821
Locksmith's Farmhouse	II	Howe Street			17 May 1985	TL7080536426; 52°00′00″N 0°29′12″E		1122703	Upload Photo	Q26415820
Pedder's Cottage	II	Howe Street			17 May 1985	TL6985534606; 51°59′02″N 0°28′19″E		1115419	Upload Photo	Q26409153
Pilgrim Cottage	II	Howe Street			17 May 1985	TL6944634362; 51°58′55″N 0°27′57″E		1338163	Upload Photo	Q26622511
Quince Cottage	II	Howe Street			17 May 1985	TL6939234346; 51°58′54″N 0°27′55″E		1338162	Upload Photo	Q26622510
Stable Block Approximately 10 Metres South East of Colemans Farmhouse	II	Howe Street			17 May 1985	TL7007134663; 51°59′04″N 0°28′31″E		1320454	Upload Photo	Q26606443
The Barretts	II	Howe Street			17 May 1985	TL6976034572; 51°59′01″N 0°28′14″E		1338161	Upload Photo	Q26622509
The White House	II	Howe Street			17 May 1985	TL6943934392; 51°58′56″N 0°27′57″E		1320429	Upload Photo	Q26606421
Timbers	II	Howe Street			17 May 1985	TL6936234307; 51°58′53″N 0°27′53″E		1122706	Upload Photo	Q26415823
Yeldhams' Farmhouse	II	Howe Street			17 May 1985	TL6996434893; 51°59′11″N 0°28′25″E		1115446	Upload Photo	Q26409176
The Pump House	II	Lower Waltham Cross			16 October 1981	TL7024230089; 51°56′36″N 0°28′31″E		1122708	Upload Photo	Q26415825
Mill Cottage Immediately East of Mill House	II	Mill Road			20 August 1991	TL6891332212; 51°57′46″N 0°27′26″E		1337817	Upload Photo	Q26622188
Petches Bridge Old Farmhouse	II	Petches Bridge Road			17 May 1985	TL6991830875; 51°57′01″N 0°28′16″E		1338164	Upload Photo	Q26622512
Petches Farmhouse	II	Petches Bridge Road			2 May 1953	TL6977031774; 51°57′31″N 0°28′10″E		1139047	Upload Photo	Q26432001
Sculpin's Farmhouse	II	Sculpins Farm Lane			17 May 1985	TL7117533158; 51°58′14″N 0°29′26″E		1139033	Upload Photo	Q26431988
1 and 2 Mill End, Spains Hall Road	II	1 and 2 Mill End, Spains Hall Road, Mill End			17 May 1985	TL6821933473; 51°58′27″N 0°26′52″E		1122713	Upload Photo	Q26415830
3 and 4 Mill End, Spains Hall Road	II	3 and 4 Mill End, Spains Hall Road, Mill End			3 April 1985	TL6823533520; 51°58′29″N 0°26′52″E		1338168	Upload Photo	Q26622516
Byre Approximately 100 Metres North North West of Spains Hall	II	Spains Hall Road			17 May 1985	TL6782634111; 51°58′48″N 0°26′32″E		1139460	Upload Photo	Q26432331
Coach House/stable Block Approximately 75 Metres North West of Spains Hall	II	Spains Hall Road			21 December 1967	TL6782134073; 51°58′47″N 0°26′32″E		1139455	Upload Photo	Q26432326
Coach House/workshop 8 Metres South West of Dovecote of Spains Hall	II	Spains Hall Road			17 May 1985	TL6779734055; 51°58′47″N 0°26′31″E		1122711	Upload Photo	Q26415828
Cottage Block Approximately 35 Metres North East of Spains Hall	II	Spains Hall Road			21 December 1967	TL6790034070; 51°58′47″N 0°26′36″E		1338167	Upload Photo	Q26622515
Curved Wall Approximately 45 Metres North East of Spains Hall	II	Spains Hall Road			21 December 1967	TL6791534057; 51°58′47″N 0°26′37″E		1145813	Upload Photo	Q26438956
Dairyley Farmhouse	II	Spains Hall Road			21 December 1967	TL6755033745; 51°58′37″N 0°26′17″E		1329949	Upload Photo	Q26615128
Dovecote Approximately 75 Metres West North West of Spains Hall	II	Spains Hall Road			21 December 1967	TL6780634058; 51°58′47″N 0°26′31″E		1338166	Upload Photo	Q26622514
Garden Pavilion Approximately 65 Metres North East of Spains Hall	II	Spains Hall Road			17 May 1985	TL6793634069; 51°58′47″N 0°26′38″E		1122712	Upload Photo	Q26415829
Mill End Cottage	II	Spains Hall Road			17 May 1985	TL6816833468; 51°58′27″N 0°26′49″E		1122710	Upload Photo	Q26415827
Spains Hall	I	Spains Hall Road	English country house		2 May 1953	TL6787634017; 51°58′45″N 0°26′35″E		1138980	Spains Hall More images	Q7572944
Wall Extending North East from Spains Hall to Garden Pavilion	II	Spains Hall Road			17 May 1985	TL6791434041; 51°58′46″N 0°26′37″E		1145823	Upload Photo	Q26438964
2, Street Farm Barn	II	2, Street Farm Barn, The Causeway, CM7 4JU			17 May 1985	TL6848032929; 51°58′09″N 0°27′04″E		1275623	Upload Photo	Q26565191
1 and 2, Sunnyside	II	1 and 2, Sunnyside, The Green, CM7 4JX			21 December 1967	TL6838232836; 51°58′07″N 0°26′59″E		1122697	Upload Photo	Q26415814
Causeway Cottage	II	2, The Causeway, CM7 4JU			21 December 1967	TL6852232829; 51°58′06″N 0°27′06″E		1115651	Upload Photo	Q26409350
Vine Cottage	II	3, The Causeway, CM7 4JU			21 December 1967	TL6852032842; 51°58′07″N 0°27′06″E		1338172	Upload Photo	Q26622520
4, the Causeway	II	4, The Causeway, CM7 4JU			21 December 1967	TL6851932851; 51°58′07″N 0°27′06″E		1115625	Upload Photo	Q26409326
5, Jasmine Cottage and 6, the Causeway	II	6, The Causeway, CM7 4JU			21 December 1967	TL6851332861; 51°58′07″N 0°27′06″E		1122726	Upload Photo	Q26415842
Mill Barn	II	The Causeway, CM7 4JU			21 December 1967	TL6848532918; 51°58′09″N 0°27′05″E		1122725	Upload Photo	Q26415841
Springmede	II*	The Causeway, CM7 4JT			21 December 1967	TL6848032873; 51°58′08″N 0°27′04″E		1122724	Upload Photo	Q17557178
Street Farmhouse and the Granary	II	The Causeway, CM7 4JT			2 May 1953	TL6848132895; 51°58′08″N 0°27′04″E		1115643	Upload Photo	Q26409341
Willetts	II	The Causeway, Duck End			21 December 1967	TL6851732971; 51°58′11″N 0°27′06″E		1338173	Upload Photo	Q26622521
North House and the Picture Pot	II	3, The Green, CM7 4JS			21 December 1967	TL6843332765; 51°58′04″N 0°27′02″E		1122701	Upload Photo	Q26415818
Bosworths Tearooms and Finchingfield Antiques Centre	II	The Green, CM7 4JX			21 December 1967	TL6841132839; 51°58′07″N 0°27′01″E		1122698	Upload Photo	Q26415815
Brick House	II	The Green			21 December 1967	TL6850532797; 51°58′05″N 0°27′05″E		1115444	Upload Photo	Q26409174
Bridge House	II	The Green			21 December 1967	TL6848632801; 51°58′05″N 0°27′04″E		1122702	Upload Photo	Q26415819
Finchingfield House	II	The Green, CM7 4JS			21 December 1967	TL6835932744; 51°58′04″N 0°26′58″E		1122695	Upload Photo	Q26415812
Former Finchingfield Congregational Church	II	The Green, CM7 4JX			17 May 1985	TL6833732850; 51°58′07″N 0°26′57″E		1338171	Upload Photo	Q26622519
Prospect Cottage	II	The Green, CM7 4JX			21 December 1967	TL6833932824; 51°58′06″N 0°26′57″E		1122723	Upload Photo	Q26415840
Prospect House	II	The Green, CM7 4JZ			21 December 1967	TL6832732792; 51°58′05″N 0°26′56″E		1122696	Upload Photo	Q26415813
Saxons	II	The Green, CM7 4JS			21 December 1967	TL6844532774; 51°58′05″N 0°27′02″E		1115437	Upload Photo	Q26409168
The Fox Inn	II	The Green, CM7 4JX	pub		21 December 1967	TL6842932839; 51°58′07″N 0°27′01″E		1122699	The Fox Inn More images	Q26415816
The Manse	II	The Green, CM7 4JX			21 December 1967	TL6844432845; 51°58′07″N 0°27′02″E		1122700	Upload Photo	Q26415817
Brook Hall	II	The Pightle			17 May 1985	TL6854932719; 51°58′03″N 0°27′08″E		1139051	Upload Photo	Q26432004
The Old Parsonage	II	The Pightle			2 May 1953	TL6866232686; 51°58′01″N 0°27′13″E		1122709	Upload Photo	Q26415826
Rivett's Farmhouse	II	Tinkers Green Road			2 May 1953	TL6737536672; 52°00′12″N 0°26′13″E		1122714	Upload Photo	Q26415831
Tinker's Green Farmhouse	II	Tinkers Green Road			17 May 1985	TL6693636355; 52°00′02″N 0°25′49″E		1318920	Upload Photo	Q26605028
Barn Approximately 60 Metres North North East of Boyton Hall	II	Toppesfield Road			17 May 1985	TL7072634054; 51°58′43″N 0°29′04″E		1337794	Upload Photo	Q26622171
Boyton Hall Farmhouse	II	Toppesfield Road			2 May 1953	TL7069533989; 51°58′41″N 0°29′02″E		1123485	Upload Photo	Q26416576
Ffuleslo	II	Toppesfield Road			17 May 1985	TL7017433104; 51°58′13″N 0°28′33″E		1123486	Upload Photo	Q26416577
Cook's Farmhouse	II	Upper Waltham Cross			17 May 1985	TL7018230367; 51°56′45″N 0°28′29″E		1123487	Upload Photo	Q26416579
Hawkin's Harvest	II	Upper Waltham Cross			23 February 1981	TL7004330567; 51°56′51″N 0°28′22″E		1337795	Upload Photo	Q26622172
Oastwood	II	Upper Waltham Cross			17 May 1985	TL6988730571; 51°56′52″N 0°28′14″E		1337796	Upload Photo	Q26622173
The Kicking Dicky	II	Upper Waltham Cross			23 February 1981	TL6990830779; 51°56′58″N 0°28′15″E		1123488	Upload Photo	Q26416580
Cabbaches	II	Vicarage Road			21 December 1967	TL6870632785; 51°58′05″N 0°27′16″E		1123489	Upload Photo	Q26416581
Barn Approximately 25 Metres West of Nortofts Farmhouse	II*	Wethersfield Road			21 December 1967	TL7048031579; 51°57′24″N 0°28′47″E		1123492	Upload Photo	Q17557360
Barn Approximately 50 Metres South West of Great Biggins Farmhouse	II	Wethersfield Road			17 May 1985	TL6889632721; 51°58′02″N 0°27′26″E		1145876	Upload Photo	Q26439029
Barn Approximately 85 Metres South West of Great Farmhouse	II	Wethersfield Road			17 May 1985	TL6886232724; 51°58′02″N 0°27′24″E		1318908	Upload Photo	Q26605019
Byre Approximately 70 Metres West South West of Great Biggins Farmhouse	II	Wethersfield Road			17 May 1985	TL6887232735; 51°58′03″N 0°27′24″E		1337798	Upload Photo	Q26622175
Great Biggins Farmhouse	II	Wethersfield Road			21 December 1967	TL6894632763; 51°58′04″N 0°27′28″E		1123491	Upload Photo	Q26416583
Hope Cottage	II	Wethersfield Road			4 December 1998	TL6875132841; 51°58′06″N 0°27′18″E		1271969	Upload Photo	Q26561851
Justices Cottage	II	Wethersfield Road			12 March 1999	TL7002632384; 51°57′50″N 0°28′24″E		1271804	Upload Photo	Q26561712
Mill View and Hillcrest	II	Wethersfield Road			17 May 1985	TL6884432854; 51°58′07″N 0°27′23″E		1145867	Upload Photo	Q26439020
Tilekiln Farmhouse	II	Wethersfield Road			24 June 1983	TL7032032256; 51°57′46″N 0°28′39″E		1123490	Upload Photo	Q26416582

== See also ==
- Grade I listed buildings in Essex
- Grade II* listed buildings in Essex

== Sources ==
- Bettley, James; Pevsner, Nikolaus (2007) [1954], Essex, The Buildings of England, New Haven and London: Yale University Press, ISBN 978-0-300-11614-4
