= Listed buildings in Halstead =

Historic structures in Essex, England

Halstead is a town and civil parish in the Braintree District of Essex, England. It contains 129 listed buildings that are recorded in the National Heritage List for England. Of these one is grade I, five are grade II* and 123 are grade II.

This list is based on the information retrieved online from Historic England.

== Key ==
Grade	Criteria
I	Buildings that are of exceptional interest
II*	Particularly important buildings of more than special interest
II	Buildings that are of special interest

== Listing ==
Name	Grade	Location	Type	Completed (Note: The date given is the date used by Historic England as significant for the initial building or that of an important part in the structure's description.)	Date designated	Grid ref. (Note: The grid reference is based on the British national grid reference system, sometimes known as OSGB36, used by the Ordnance Survey.) Geo-coordinates	Notes	Entry number (Note: The "List Entry Number" is a unique number assigned to each listed building and scheduled monument by Historic England.)	Image	Wikidata
Balls Farmhouse	II	Balls Chase			16 March 1978	TL8157629851; 51°56′15″N 0°38′24″E		1122450	Upload Photo	Q26415603
Slough Farmhouse	II	Berridge Road			16 March 1978	TL8080230805; 51°56′47″N 0°37′45″E		1122451	Upload Photo	Q26415604
Blue Bridge Cottage	II	Blue Bridge			16 March 1978	TL8243430194; 51°56′25″N 0°39′10″E		1338280	Upload Photo	Q26622616
Brick Barn Hall	II	Blue Bridge			24 February 1950	TL8248830074; 51°56′21″N 0°39′12″E		1338281	Upload Photo	Q26622617
Brook Farmhouse	II	Blue Bridge			24 February 1950	TL8250430111; 51°56′22″N 0°39′13″E		1122452	Upload Photo	Q26415605
25, Box Mill Lane	II	25, Box Mill Lane			16 March 1978	TL8120831279; 51°57′02″N 0°38′07″E		1122453	Upload Photo	Q26415606
5-9, Bridge Street	II	5-9, Bridge Street			16 March 1978	TL8117230499; 51°56′37″N 0°38′04″E		1338282	Upload Photo	Q26622619
Branch Library	II	Bridge Street			16 March 1978	TL8114630508; 51°56′37″N 0°38′03″E		1122454	Upload Photo	Q26415607
Bull Hotel	II	Bridge Street			16 March 1978	TL8119430478; 51°56′36″N 0°38′05″E		1122455	Upload Photo	Q26415608
The Locomotive Public House	II	Butler Road			16 March 1978	TL8105630582; 51°56′39″N 0°37′58″E		1122456	Upload Photo	Q26415609
Coach House to Mill House	II	Causeway			16 March 1978	TL8126930398; 51°56′33″N 0°38′09″E		1122459	Upload Photo	Q26415611
Gatehouse to Mill House	II	Causeway			16 March 1978	TL8127530407; 51°56′33″N 0°38′09″E		1306653	Upload Photo	Q26593414
Mill House	II	Causeway			24 February 1950	TL8129230380; 51°56′33″N 0°38′10″E		1122458	Upload Photo	Q26415610
Old Townford Mill	II*	Causeway	mill building		24 February 1950	TL8129830396; 51°56′33″N 0°38′10″E		1122457	Old Townford Mill More images	Q17557125
1-5, Chapel Hill	II	1-5, Chapel Hill			16 March 1978	TL8082830427; 51°56′35″N 0°37′46″E		1122460	Upload Photo	Q26415612
Barn at Crowbridge Farmhouse	II	Chapel Hill			16 March 1978	TL8053230700; 51°56′44″N 0°37′31″E		1338283	Upload Photo	Q26622620
Bird in Hand Public House	II	Chapel Hill			16 March 1978	TL8066830572; 51°56′40″N 0°37′38″E		1122461	Upload Photo	Q26415613
Crowbridge Farm Cottages	II	Chapel Hill			16 March 1978	TL8057630712; 51°56′44″N 0°37′33″E		1306658	Upload Photo	Q26593417
No 7 and Nos 9-13, Chapel Hill	II	Chapel Hill			24 February 1950	TL8080830432; 51°56′35″N 0°37′45″E		1169197	Upload Photo	Q26462400
Broomhill	II	Colchester Road			16 March 1978	TL8158330728; 51°56′43″N 0°38′26″E		1122462	Upload Photo	Q26415614
Cemetery Lodge	II	Colchester Road			16 March 1978	TL8190130585; 51°56′38″N 0°38′42″E		1122463	Upload Photo	Q26415615
Red House	II	Colchester Road			16 March 1978	TL8160230712; 51°56′43″N 0°38′27″E		1169213	Upload Photo	Q26462417
Office and Stores Building, East of Braintree District Council Offices	II	East Of Braintree District Council Offices, Trinity Street			16 March 1978	TL8092230509; 51°56′37″N 0°37′51″E		1338302	Upload Photo	Q26622638
1-16, Factory Lane East	II	1-16, Factory Lane East			16 March 1978	TL8137530484; 51°56′36″N 0°38′15″E		1169217	Upload Photo	Q26462422
2 and 4, Head Street	II	2 and 4, Head Street			16 March 1978	TL8157130738; 51°56′44″N 0°38′25″E		1306635	Upload Photo	Q26593399
3, Head Street	II	3, Head Street			16 March 1978	TL8151530731; 51°56′44″N 0°38′22″E		1122427	Upload Photo	Q26415579
5 and 7, Head Street	II	5 and 7, Head Street			16 March 1978	TL8152730736; 51°56′44″N 0°38′23″E		1338307	Upload Photo	Q26622643
6, Head Street	II	6, Head Street			16 March 1978	TL8158830733; 51°56′44″N 0°38′26″E		1338285	Upload Photo	Q26622621
8, Head Street	II	8, Head Street			16 March 1978	TL8159130736; 51°56′44″N 0°38′26″E		1122465	Upload Photo	Q26415617
11 and 13, Head Street	II	11 and 13, Head Street			16 March 1978	TL8153930743; 51°56′44″N 0°38′24″E		1122428	Upload Photo	Q26415580
14, Head Street	II	14, Head Street			16 March 1978	TL8160730777; 51°56′45″N 0°38′27″E		1169243	Upload Photo	Q26462446
15 and 17, Head Street	II	15 and 17, Head Street			16 March 1978	TL8154730751; 51°56′44″N 0°38′24″E		1338308	Upload Photo	Q26622644
20, Head Street	II	20, Head Street			16 March 1978	TL8162030793; 51°56′46″N 0°38′28″E		1338303	Upload Photo	Q26622639
21 and 23, Head Street	II	21 and 23, Head Street			16 March 1978	TL8156430758; 51°56′44″N 0°38′25″E		1169260	Upload Photo	Q26462459
22-26, Head Street	II	22-26, Head Street			16 March 1978	TL8162430800; 51°56′46″N 0°38′28″E		1122422	Upload Photo	Q26415574
27-31, Head Street	II	27-31, Head Street			16 March 1978	TL8157530768; 51°56′45″N 0°38′26″E		1122429	Upload Photo	Q26415581
28, Head Street	II	28, Head Street			16 March 1978	TL8163230812; 51°56′46″N 0°38′29″E		1122423	Upload Photo	Q26415575
32 and 32a, Head Street	II	32 and 32a, Head Street			26 June 1973	TL8164030827; 51°56′47″N 0°38′29″E		1338304	Upload Photo	Q26622640
33 and 35, Head Street	II	33 and 35, Head Street			16 March 1978	TL8158630780; 51°56′45″N 0°38′26″E		1122430	Upload Photo	Q26415582
34 and 36, Head Street	II	34 and 36, Head Street			26 June 1973	TL8164930835; 51°56′47″N 0°38′30″E		1122424	Upload Photo	Q26415576
38, Head Street	II	38, Head Street			26 June 1973	TL8165630844; 51°56′47″N 0°38′30″E		1338305	Upload Photo	Q26622641
Barton House	II	41, Head Street			16 March 1978	TL8159930796; 51°56′46″N 0°38′27″E		1169287	Upload Photo	Q26462485
43, Head Street	II	43, Head Street			16 March 1978	TL8160530802; 51°56′46″N 0°38′27″E		1338309	Upload Photo	Q26622645
45 and 47, Head Street	II	45 and 47, Head Street			16 March 1978	TL8161230812; 51°56′46″N 0°38′28″E		1122431	Upload Photo	Q26415584
The Chase	II	49, Head Street			16 March 1978	TL8157830854; 51°56′48″N 0°38′26″E		1169293	Upload Photo	Q26462492
57 and 59, Head Street	II	57 and 59, Head Street			16 March 1978	TL8162830835; 51°56′47″N 0°38′29″E		1338310	Upload Photo	Q26622646
71-77, Head Street	II	71-77, Head Street			16 March 1978	TL8165330870; 51°56′48″N 0°38′30″E		1306588	Upload Photo	Q26593354
89, Head Street	II	89, Head Street, CO9 2AZ			16 March 1978	TL8167130909; 51°56′49″N 0°38′31″E		1122433	Upload Photo	Q26415586
91, Head Street	II	91, Head Street			16 March 1978	TL8167630915; 51°56′49″N 0°38′31″E		1306589	Upload Photo	Q26593355
93, Head Street	II	93, Head Street			16 March 1978	TL8168430922; 51°56′50″N 0°38′32″E		1122434	Upload Photo	Q26415587
95 and 97, Head Street	II	95 and 97, Head Street			16 March 1978	TL8169130933; 51°56′50″N 0°38′32″E		1169317	Upload Photo	Q26462511
99 and 101, Head Street	II	99 and 101, Head Street			16 March 1978	TL8170130940; 51°56′50″N 0°38′33″E		1122436	Upload Photo	Q26415589
103 and 105, Head Street	II	103 and 105, Head Street			16 March 1978	TL8171030946; 51°56′50″N 0°38′33″E		1169322	Upload Photo	Q26462516
1a, 1b and 1c, Head Street	II	1a, 1b and 1c, Head Street			16 March 1978	TL8151030722; 51°56′43″N 0°38′22″E		1338306	Upload Photo	Q26622642
Chipping Hill House	II	Head Street			16 March 1978	TL8162230767; 51°56′45″N 0°38′28″E		1338286	Upload Photo	Q26622622
Greenwood School	II	Head Street			16 March 1978	TL8166530891; 51°56′49″N 0°38′31″E		1122432	Upload Photo	Q26415585
Napier Arms Public House	II	Head Street			16 March 1978	TL8169230894; 51°56′49″N 0°38′32″E		1122426	Upload Photo	Q26415578
Parish Church of St Andrew	I	Head Street	church building		24 February 1950	TL8152330691; 51°56′42″N 0°38′23″E		1338284	Parish Church of St Andrew More images	Q17536294
Rose and Crown Public House	II	Head Street			16 March 1978	TL8167130868; 51°56′48″N 0°38′31″E		1122425	Upload Photo	Q26415577
Veterinary Surgery and Stables	II	Head Street			16 March 1978	TL8165630960; 51°56′51″N 0°38′30″E		1122435	Upload Photo	Q26415588
8, Hedingham Road	II	8, Hedingham Road			16 March 1978	TL8143330750; 51°56′44″N 0°38′18″E		1122438	Upload Photo	Q26415591
9-15, Hedingham Road	II	9-15, Hedingham Road			16 March 1978	TL8141330744; 51°56′44″N 0°38′17″E		1122437	Upload Photo	Q26415590
Barn at Wash Farm	II	Hedingham Road			16 March 1978	TL8131431297; 51°57′02″N 0°38′13″E		1122439	Upload Photo	Q26415592
The Howe	II	Hedingham Road			16 March 1978	TL8120231748; 51°57′17″N 0°38′08″E		1306600	Upload Photo	Q26593366
Wash Farm	II	Hedingham Road			24 February 1950	TL8136631310; 51°57′03″N 0°38′16″E		1169328	Upload Photo	Q26462522
1, High Street (see Details for Further Address Information)	II	1, High Street			16 March 1978	TL8148230688; 51°56′42″N 0°38′21″E		1122401	Upload Photo	Q26415554
2, High Street	II	2, High Street			16 March 1978	TL8144530712; 51°56′43″N 0°38′19″E		1122440	Upload Photo	Q26415593
3, High Street	II	3, High Street			16 March 1978	TL8147730686; 51°56′42″N 0°38′20″E		1338333	Upload Photo	Q26622667
5 and 7, High Street	II	5 and 7, High Street			16 March 1978	TL8147230683; 51°56′42″N 0°38′20″E		1122402	Upload Photo	Q26415555
9 and 11, High Street	II	9 and 11, High Street			16 March 1978	TL8146430677; 51°56′42″N 0°38′20″E		1122403	Upload Photo	Q26415556
10, High Street	II	10, High Street			16 March 1978	TL8144330706; 51°56′43″N 0°38′19″E		1338311	Upload Photo	Q26622647
12, High Street	II	12, High Street			16 March 1978	TL8144130702; 51°56′43″N 0°38′19″E		1306603	Upload Photo	Q26593369
13, High Street	II	13, High Street			16 March 1978	TL8145630673; 51°56′42″N 0°38′19″E		1338334	Upload Photo	Q26622668
17 and 17a, High Street	II	17 and 17a, High Street			16 March 1978	TL8143330660; 51°56′41″N 0°38′18″E		1338335	Upload Photo	Q26622669
18 and 20, High Street	II	18 and 20, High Street			24 February 1950	TL8141830687; 51°56′42″N 0°38′17″E		1122441	Upload Photo	Q26415594
19, High Street	II	19, High Street			2 November 1994	TL8142930658; 51°56′41″N 0°38′18″E		1140087	Upload Photo	Q26432884
21, High Street	II	21, High Street			16 March 1978	TL8142630655; 51°56′41″N 0°38′18″E		1122405	Upload Photo	Q26415558
22 and 24, High Street	II*	22 and 24, High Street			24 February 1950	TL8140530681; 51°56′42″N 0°38′17″E		1338312	Upload Photo	Q17557948
25, High Street	II	25, High Street			16 March 1978	TL8141430652; 51°56′41″N 0°38′17″E		1338296	Upload Photo	Q26622632
26, High Street	II*	26, High Street			24 February 1950	TL8139230675; 51°56′42″N 0°38′16″E		1169344	Upload Photo	Q17557590
28, 30a and 30b, High Street	II	28, 30a and 30b, High Street			16 March 1978	TL8138430670; 51°56′42″N 0°38′15″E		1122442	Upload Photo	Q26415595
The White House	II	32, High Street			24 February 1950	TL8136730664; 51°56′42″N 0°38′15″E		1169357	Upload Photo	Q26462551
33, High Street	II	33, High Street			16 March 1978	TL8137630633; 51°56′41″N 0°38′15″E		1122406	Upload Photo	Q26415559
36, High Street	II	36, High Street			16 March 1978	TL8134830649; 51°56′41″N 0°38′14″E		1338313	Upload Photo	Q26622648
37 and 39, High Street	II	37 and 39, High Street			14 January 1974	TL8136430626; 51°56′40″N 0°38′14″E		1169373	Upload Photo	Q26462567
40 and 42, High Street	II	40 and 42, High Street			16 March 1978	TL8133630638; 51°56′41″N 0°38′13″E		1122443	Upload Photo	Q26415596
41 and 43, High Street	II	41 and 43, High Street			16 March 1978	TL8135430621; 51°56′40″N 0°38′14″E		1122407	Upload Photo	Q26415560
45, High Street	II	45, High Street			16 March 1978	TL8134530616; 51°56′40″N 0°38′13″E		1338297	Upload Photo	Q26622633
47 and 47a, High Street	II	47 and 47a, High Street			16 March 1978	TL8134030612; 51°56′40″N 0°38′13″E		1169374	Upload Photo	Q26462568
49 and 51, High Street	II	49 and 51, High Street			16 March 1978	TL8133230606; 51°56′40″N 0°38′13″E		1122408	Upload Photo	Q26415561
53 and 55, High Street	II	53 and 55, High Street			16 March 1978	TL8132830600; 51°56′40″N 0°38′12″E		1169375	Upload Photo	Q26462569
57, High Street	II	57, High Street			16 March 1978	TL8131730593; 51°56′39″N 0°38′12″E		1338298	Upload Photo	Q26622634
59 and 61, High Street	II	59 and 61, High Street			16 March 1978	TL8131130587; 51°56′39″N 0°38′12″E		1122409	Upload Photo	Q26415562
60 and 62, High Street	II	60 and 62, High Street			16 March 1978	TL8125730572; 51°56′39″N 0°38′09″E		1122444	Upload Photo	Q26415597
65 and 67, High Street	II	65 and 67, High Street			16 March 1978	TL8129730577; 51°56′39″N 0°38′11″E		1169376	Upload Photo	Q26462570
70-74, High Street	II	70-74, High Street			26 June 1973	TL8123530550; 51°56′38″N 0°38′07″E		1122400	Upload Photo	Q26415553
75, High Street	II	75, High Street			16 March 1978	TL8128030562; 51°56′38″N 0°38′10″E		1122410	Upload Photo	Q26415563
82, High Street	II	82, High Street			12 September 1972	TL8122730521; 51°56′37″N 0°38′07″E		1338332	Upload Photo	Q26622666
99-107, High Street	II	99-107, High Street			16 March 1978	TL8124830509; 51°56′37″N 0°38′08″E		1338299	Upload Photo	Q26622635
Royal Oak Public House	II	High Street	pub		16 March 1978	TL8126630580; 51°56′39″N 0°38′09″E		1306575	Royal Oak Public House More images	Q26593341
The White Hart Inn	II	High Street			16 March 1978	TL8144330662; 51°56′42″N 0°38′19″E		1122404	Upload Photo	Q26415557
Three Tombs, Immediately South East of South Porch St Andrew's Church	II	Immediately South East Of South Porch St Andrew's Church, Head Street			16 March 1978	TL8153230675; 51°56′42″N 0°38′23″E		1122464	Upload Photo	Q26415616
1 and 3, Market Hill	II	1 and 3, Market Hill, CO9 2AR			16 March 1978	TL8148430714; 51°56′43″N 0°38′21″E		1122411	Upload Photo	Q26415564
Drinking Fountain	II	Market Hill			16 March 1978	TL8146430700; 51°56′43″N 0°38′20″E		1169393	Upload Photo	Q26462583
Lloyds Bank Limited	II	Market Hill			16 March 1978	TL8146030728; 51°56′44″N 0°38′20″E		1169402	Upload Photo	Q26462592
Windmill House	II	Mill Chase, CO9 2DQ			16 March 1978	TL8154230984; 51°56′52″N 0°38′24″E		1122412	Upload Photo	Q26415565
Blamsters	II	Mount Hill			24 February 1950	TL8053230073; 51°56′24″N 0°37′30″E		1122414	Upload Photo	Q26415567
The Three Pigeons Public House	II	Mount Hill			16 March 1978	TL8074130076; 51°56′23″N 0°37′41″E		1169414	Upload Photo	Q26462604
Mill and Mill Building, North Mills	II	North Mills, Mill Chase			16 March 1978	TL8152430986; 51°56′52″N 0°38′23″E		1122413	Upload Photo	Q26415566
1-7, Parsonage Street	II	1-7, Parsonage Street			16 March 1978	TL8154530652; 51°56′41″N 0°38′24″E		1122415	Upload Photo	Q26415568
2 and 4, Parsonage Street	II	2 and 4, Parsonage Street			16 March 1978	TL8149230671; 51°56′42″N 0°38′21″E		1122416	Upload Photo	Q26415569
6 and 8, Parsonage Street	II	6 and 8, Parsonage Street			16 March 1978	TL8149630664; 51°56′42″N 0°38′21″E		1169426	Upload Photo	Q26462618
9, Parsonage Street	II	9, Parsonage Street			16 March 1978	TL8156430639; 51°56′41″N 0°38′25″E		1306526	Upload Photo	Q26593297
10, Parsonage Street	II	10, Parsonage Street			16 March 1978	TL8150230660; 51°56′41″N 0°38′22″E		1122417	Upload Photo	Q26415570
12, Parsonage Street	II	12, Parsonage Street			16 March 1978	TL8150530655; 51°56′41″N 0°38′22″E		1338300	Upload Photo	Q26622636
Congregational Church	II	Parsonage Street			16 March 1978	TL8153830570; 51°56′38″N 0°38′23″E		1169434	Upload Photo	Q26462627
Halstead Pottery and Craft Studio Immediately South West of Numbers 2 and 4 Parsonage Street	II	Parsonage Street			10 March 1992	TL8148030666; 51°56′42″N 0°38′21″E		1276404	Upload Photo	Q26565920
Parsonage House	II	Parsonage Street			16 March 1978	TL8153130278; 51°56′29″N 0°38′22″E		1338301	Upload Photo	Q26622637
The Griffin Public House	II	Parsonage Street			16 March 1978	TL8162630382; 51°56′32″N 0°38′28″E		1122418	Upload Photo	Q26415571
11, Sudbury Road	II	11, Sudbury Road			16 March 1978	TL8179831096; 51°56′55″N 0°38′38″E		1306535	Upload Photo	Q26593304
1-2, the Causeway	II	1-2, The Causeway			5 August 1994	TL8121230466; 51°56′35″N 0°38′06″E		1221814	Upload Photo	Q26516185
3-12, the Causeway	II	3-12, The Causeway			5 August 1995	TL8122730446; 51°56′35″N 0°38′07″E		1221815	Upload Photo	Q26516186
Royal British Legion Club	II	The Causeway			5 August 1995	TL8125730408; 51°56′34″N 0°38′08″E		1221817	Upload Photo	Q26516187
Holy Trinity Church	II*	Trinity Street	church building		16 March 1978	TL8083730478; 51°56′36″N 0°37′47″E		1122421	Holy Trinity Church More images	Q5886503
Pitchards	II	Trinity Street			16 March 1978	TL8084630560; 51°56′39″N 0°37′47″E		1306541	Upload Photo	Q26593310
The Chestnuts	II	Trinity Street			16 March 1978	TL8099430517; 51°56′37″N 0°37′55″E		1122419	Upload Photo	Q26415573
The Old Mineral Water Works	II	Trinity Street			16 March 1978	TL8096030526; 51°56′38″N 0°37′53″E		1306537	Upload Photo	Q26593306
Trinity House	II*	Trinity Street	house		24 February 1950	TL8094130499; 51°56′37″N 0°37′52″E		1122420	Trinity House More images	Q17557121
7-18, Weavers Row	II	7-18, Weavers Row			16 March 1978	TL8172430451; 51°56′34″N 0°38′33″E		1169452	Upload Photo	Q26462645

== See also ==
- Grade I listed buildings in Essex
- Grade II* listed buildings in Essex

== Sources ==
- Bettley, James; Pevsner, Nikolaus (2007) [1954], Essex, The Buildings of England, New Haven and London: Yale University Press, ISBN 978-0-300-11614-4
