= Listed buildings in Kelvedon =

Historic structures in Essex, England

Kelvedon is a village and civil parish in the Braintree District of Essex, England. It contains 123 listed buildings that are recorded in the National Heritage List for England. Of these two are grade I, nine are grade II* and 112 are grade II.

This list is based on the information retrieved online from Historic England.

== Key ==
Grade	Criteria
I	Buildings that are of exceptional interest
II*	Particularly important buildings of more than special interest
II	Buildings that are of special interest

== Listing ==
Name	Grade	Location	Type	Completed (Note: The date given is the date used by Historic England as significant for the initial building or that of an important part in the structure's description.)	Date designated	Grid ref. (Note: The grid reference is based on the British national grid reference system, sometimes known as OSGB36, used by the Ordnance Survey.) Geo-coordinates	Notes	Entry number (Note: The "List Entry Number" is a unique number assigned to each listed building and scheduled monument by Historic England.)	Image	Wikidata
Ancillary Building 10 Metres North East of Woodhouse Farmhouse	II				18 May 1987	TL8263320606; 51°51′15″N 0°39′02″E		1123844	Upload Photo	Q26416933
Pump 13 Metres East of Woodhouse Farmhouse	II				18 May 1987	TL8263420600; 51°51′15″N 0°39′02″E		1169918	Upload Photo	Q26463111
Barn 45 Metres North North West of Allshot's Farmhouse	II				29 July 1988	TL8298420512; 51°51′12″N 0°39′20″E		1169906	Upload Photo	Q26463091
Allshot's Farmhouse	II				29 July 1988	TL8298520460; 51°51′10″N 0°39′20″E		1337612	Upload Photo	Q26622012
Woodhouse Farmhouse	II				18 May 1987	TL8261620596; 51°51′15″N 0°39′01″E		1123843	Upload Photo	Q26416932
Numbers 180a, B and C, and Wing to East in Swan Street	II*	B And C, And Wing To East In Swan Street, 180a B C, High Street			2 May 1953	TL8648519173; 51°50′24″N 0°42′20″E		1337625	Upload Photo	Q17557819
Lingwoods	II	Church Hill			29 May 1987	TL8536118746; 51°50′12″N 0°41′21″E		1306290	Upload Photo	Q26593084
Lingwoods Cottage	II	Church Hill			29 July 1988	TL8536918742; 51°50′11″N 0°41′21″E		1123846	Upload Photo	Q26416935
Old Timbers	II	1, Church Street			21 December 1967	TL8589818430; 51°50′01″N 0°41′48″E		1123808	Upload Photo	Q26416903
East Boundary Wall of Churchyard of St Mary's Church, Extending from the Gateway on the Axis of the Church Approximately 15 Metres to the East Gateway	II	Extending From The Gateway On The Axis Of The Church Approximately 15 Metres To The East Gateway, Church Street			29 July 1988	TL8568118568; 51°50′05″N 0°41′37″E		1123809	Upload Photo	Q26416904
Brunswick Cottage Brunswick House	II	Church Street			25 June 1974	TL8583718411; 51°50′00″N 0°41′45″E		1123810	Upload Photo	Q26416905
Brunswick Lodge	II	Church Street			25 June 1974	TL8586418428; 51°50′01″N 0°41′46″E		1337633	Upload Photo	Q26622029
Brunswick Villa	II	Church Street			25 June 1974	TL8586018433; 51°50′01″N 0°41′46″E		1123811	Upload Photo	Q26416906
Fullerthorne and Railings and Gate to Front	II	Church Street			25 June 1974	TL8574818529; 51°50′04″N 0°41′40″E		1123847	Upload Photo	Q26416936
Lawn Cottage and Railings and Gate to Front	II	Church Street			25 June 1974	TL8573618543; 51°50′05″N 0°41′40″E		1306295	Upload Photo	Q26593089
Parish Church of St Mary	I	Church Street	parish church		21 December 1967	TL8564518566; 51°50′05″N 0°41′35″E		1337631	Parish Church of St Mary More images	Q17536174
Red House	II*	Church Street	house		2 May 1953	TL8578018515; 51°50′04″N 0°41′42″E		1169951	Red House More images	Q17557605
The Vicarage	II	Church Street			25 June 1974	TL8559618495; 51°50′03″N 0°41′32″E		1337632	Upload Photo	Q26622028
Moorings	II	Coggeshall Road			29 July 1988	TL8614819702; 51°50′42″N 0°42′03″E		1337634	Upload Photo	Q26622030
Pound Farmhouse	II	Coggeshall Road			16 October 1981	TL8569620490; 51°51′08″N 0°41′41″E		1123812	Upload Photo	Q26416907
Clark's Farmhouse	II	Crabbs Lane			29 July 1988	TL8471618087; 51°49′51″N 0°40′46″E		1306239	Upload Photo	Q26593040
Granary 23 Metres South West of Clark's Farmhouse	II	Crabbs Lane			29 July 1988	TL8468618078; 51°49′51″N 0°40′44″E		1123813	Upload Photo	Q26416908
Barn Immediately South East of Crabb's Farmhouse	II	Cranes Lane, Crabbs Lane			29 July 1988	TL8511217877; 51°49′44″N 0°41′06″E		1170076	Upload Photo	Q26463348
Crabb's Farmhouse	II	Cranes Lane, Crabbs Lane			29 July 1988	TL8510017889; 51°49′44″N 0°41′05″E		1337635	Upload Photo	Q26622031
Wall Forming the Boundary of Church Street, from the Vehicle Entrance of the Gardens Bungalow, Extending 49 Metres to the North West to the Splayed Entrance of Millers Garden	II	From The Vehicle Entrance Of The Gardens Bungalow, Extending 49 Metres To The North West To The Splayed Entrance Of Millers Garden, Church Street			25 June 1974	TL8583018477; 51°50′02″N 0°41′44″E		1123807	Upload Photo	Q26416902
Gate, Gateway and Railings on Dwarf Wall, Forming the Roadside Boundary to South-west of Red House	II	Gateway And Railings On Dwarf Wall, Forming The Roadside Boundary To South-west Of Red House, Church Street			29 July 1988	TL8577618507; 51°50′03″N 0°41′42″E		1123848	Upload Photo	Q26416937
1-5, High Street	I	1-5, High Street	building		21 December 1967	TL8590518429; 51°50′01″N 0°41′48″E		1123814	1-5, High Street More images	Q17535917
The White Hart Inn	II	2, High Street			21 December 1967	TL8594418435; 51°50′01″N 0°41′50″E		1123787	Upload Photo	Q26416882
4-8, High Street	II	4-8, High Street			2 May 1953	TL8595518442; 51°50′01″N 0°41′51″E		1337659	Upload Photo	Q26622054
7, High Street	II	7, High Street			21 December 1967	TL8592018448; 51°50′01″N 0°41′49″E		1170131	Upload Photo	Q26463459
Chase House	II	9, High Street			21 December 1967	TL8592818465; 51°50′02″N 0°41′50″E		1123815	Upload Photo	Q26416909
Cobbins	II	11, 13 and 15, High Street			21 December 1967	TL8593718471; 51°50′02″N 0°41′50″E		1306157	Upload Photo	Q26592961
Grangewood	II	12, High Street			21 December 1967	TL8597718447; 51°50′01″N 0°41′52″E		1123788	Upload Photo	Q26416883
Thomas Sykes Antiques	II	16, High Street			21 December 1967	TL8598418493; 51°50′03″N 0°41′53″E		1123789	Upload Photo	Q26416884
Dial House	II	19, High Street			25 June 1974	TL8594618491; 51°50′03″N 0°41′51″E		1337636	Upload Photo	Q26622032
Old Timbers	II	23, High Street			21 December 1967	TL8595118499; 51°50′03″N 0°41′51″E		1123816	Upload Photo	Q26416910
Elizabeth House	II	25, High Street			21 December 1967	TL8595218507; 51°50′03″N 0°41′51″E		1170233	Upload Photo	Q26463561
26-30, High Street	II*	26-30, High Street			25 June 1974	TL8599618524; 51°50′04″N 0°41′53″E		1337621	Upload Photo	Q17557817
Oakland Cottage	II	33, High Street			21 December 1967	TL8597518531; 51°50′04″N 0°41′52″E		1337637	Upload Photo	Q26622033
Number 35 and North West Part of Number 33	II	35, High Street			21 December 1967	TL8597818538; 51°50′04″N 0°41′52″E		1170241	Upload Photo	Q26463570
Kentwell	II	37, High Street			21 December 1967	TL8598018546; 51°50′04″N 0°41′52″E		1123817	Upload Photo	Q26416911
39, High Street	II	39, High Street			25 June 1974	TL8598018555; 51°50′05″N 0°41′52″E		1170265	Upload Photo	Q26463588
Kelvedon Lady Mason's Butchers	II	43, High Street			25 June 1974	TL8598918564; 51°50′05″N 0°41′53″E		1123818	Upload Photo	Q26416912
Brimpton House	II	59, High Street			25 June 1974	TL8601418635; 51°50′07″N 0°41′54″E		1337638	Upload Photo	Q26622034
Forge Cottage Including Attached Railings and Gate	II	61, High Street			25 June 1974	TL8602818644; 51°50′08″N 0°41′55″E		1306108	Upload Photo	Q26592916
65-69, High Street	II	65-69, High Street			21 December 1967	TL8604118664; 51°50′08″N 0°41′56″E		1123819	Upload Photo	Q26416913
Spurgeon Cottage Spurgeon House	II	73, High Street			21 December 1967	TL8605218680; 51°50′09″N 0°41′56″E		1170300	Upload Photo	Q26463647
Kelvedon Labour Club	II	75, High Street			29 July 1988	TL8606018703; 51°50′09″N 0°41′57″E		1337639	Upload Photo	Q26622035
Western Cottage	II	76, High Street			25 June 1974	TL8612818752; 51°50′11″N 0°42′01″E		1123790	Upload Photo	Q26416885
91-97, High Street	II	91-97, High Street			25 June 1974	TL8611818773; 51°50′12″N 0°42′00″E		1170318	Upload Photo	Q26463688
Warehouse and Workshop at Mellons Timber Yard	II	99, High Street			25 June 1974	TL8611618800; 51°50′12″N 0°42′00″E		1123820	Upload Photo	Q26416914
Ormonde Lodge	II	103, High Street			2 May 1953	TL8613318821; 51°50′13″N 0°42′01″E		1170329	Upload Photo	Q26463713
Ormonde Cottage Ormonde House	II	107, High Street			2 May 1953	TL8614818834; 51°50′14″N 0°42′02″E		1123821	Upload Photo	Q26416915
St Andrews	II	113, High Street			21 December 1967	TL8616918857; 51°50′14″N 0°42′03″E		1170359	Upload Photo	Q26463775
Alma Cottage Norbury House	II	115, High Street			21 December 1967	TL8618018870; 51°50′15″N 0°42′03″E		1337601	Upload Photo	Q26622002
Number 119 and Railings to Front	II	119, High Street			25 June 1974	TL8618418882; 51°50′15″N 0°42′04″E		1123822	Upload Photo	Q26416916
Walnut House	II	125 and 127, High Street			21 December 1967	TL8618718899; 51°50′16″N 0°42′04″E		1366145	Upload Photo	Q26647772
The George Inn	II	131, High Street			25 June 1974	TL8621618926; 51°50′16″N 0°42′05″E		1123823	Upload Photo	Q26416917
133-139, High Street	II	133-139, High Street			25 June 1974	TL8621918929; 51°50′16″N 0°42′06″E		1170390	Upload Photo	Q26463837
Bell House	II	136, High Street			2 May 1953	TL8629319002; 51°50′19″N 0°42′10″E		1337622	Upload Photo	Q26622020
Peppercorn Whole Foods	II	138, High Street			21 December 1967	TL8630719014; 51°50′19″N 0°42′10″E		1123791	Upload Photo	Q26416886
Gages	II	140, High Street			21 December 1967	TL8631119020; 51°50′19″N 0°42′11″E		1123792	Upload Photo	Q26416887
White House	II	142, High Street			2 May 1953	TL8631519029; 51°50′20″N 0°42′11″E		1337623	Upload Photo	Q26622021
Belle Couture	II	144, High Street			21 December 1967	TL8632119039; 51°50′20″N 0°42′11″E		1305900	Upload Photo	Q26592726
The Lawn House and Railings and Gate to Front	II	146, High Street			2 May 1953	TL8633619047; 51°50′20″N 0°42′12″E		1123793	Upload Photo	Q26416888
Number 148 (orchard House and Post Office) and Number 150	II*	150, High Street	post office		2 May 1953	TL8634919072; 51°50′21″N 0°42′13″E		1170818	Number 148 (orchard House and Post Office) and Number 150 More images	Q17557640
152, High Street	II	152, High Street			25 June 1974	TL8636219078; 51°50′21″N 0°42′13″E		1247997	Upload Photo	Q26540247
Numbers 156 (chambers ), 158 (dormers) and 160 (gables)	II*	156, High Street			2 May 1953	TL8638719103; 51°50′22″N 0°42′15″E		1170862	Upload Photo	Q17557654
162 and 164, High Street	II	162 and 164, High Street			25 June 1974	TL8639819113; 51°50′22″N 0°42′15″E		1123794	Upload Photo	Q26416889
Doucecroft School	II	163, High Street			2 May 1953	TL8628619034; 51°50′20″N 0°42′09″E		1123824	Upload Photo	Q26416918
Deacons Newsagents	II	166, High Street			21 December 1967	TL8640819120; 51°50′22″N 0°42′16″E		1170945	Upload Photo	Q26464652
Numbers 169 (shepherds) , 171 (ruskin) and 173 (wells Cottage)	II	171, High Street			25 June 1974	TL8632419073; 51°50′21″N 0°42′11″E		1170406	Upload Photo	Q26463866
T C News	II	175, High Street			25 June 1974	TL8633119080; 51°50′21″N 0°42′12″E		1123825	Upload Photo	Q26416919
Wyvern House	II	176, High Street			21 December 1967	TL8645919155; 51°50′24″N 0°42′19″E		1123795	Upload Photo	Q26416890
Bridge House	II	178, High Street			21 December 1967	TL8646619159; 51°50′24″N 0°42′19″E		1170952	Upload Photo	Q26464663
Virginia House	II	193, High Street			29 July 1988	TL8635719104; 51°50′22″N 0°42′13″E		1170430	Upload Photo	Q26463914
Heigaines	II	195, High Street			29 July 1988	TL8636819115; 51°50′22″N 0°42′14″E		1123826	Upload Photo	Q26416920
Quaker Meeting House, to Rear of Numbers 203-5	II	To Rear Of Numbers 203-5, High Street			29 May 1987	TL8637319154; 51°50′24″N 0°42′14″E		1170446	Upload Photo	Q26463946
219 and 221, High Street	II	219 and 221, High Street			25 June 1974	TL8644019171; 51°50′24″N 0°42′18″E		1123827	Upload Photo	Q26416921
Barn at Rear of Numbers 156 to 160 (even)	II	High Street			29 July 1988	TL8640319080; 51°50′21″N 0°42′16″E		1337624	Upload Photo	Q26622022
Ewell Hall	II	Highfields Lane			2 May 1953	TL8659318158; 51°49′51″N 0°42′24″E		1170980	Upload Photo	Q26464694
Highfields Farmhouse and Attached Cottage to North East	II	Highfields Lane			29 July 1988	TL8679217490; 51°49′29″N 0°42′33″E		1337626	Upload Photo	Q26622023
Noah's Ark Cottage	II	Highfields Lane			25 June 1974	TL8622218072; 51°49′49″N 0°42′04″E		1170973	Upload Photo	Q26464686
Tanners	II	Highfields Lane			25 June 1974	TL8624718056; 51°49′48″N 0°42′05″E		1123796	Upload Photo	Q26416891
Barn 15 Metres South West of Leapingwell's Farmhouse	II	Hollow Road			29 July 1988	TL8421419019; 51°50′22″N 0°40′21″E		1305775	Upload Photo	Q26592608
Cotcroft Cottage	II	Hollow Road			29 July 1988	TL8489718803; 51°50′14″N 0°40′56″E		1123800	Upload Photo	Q26416896
Cottage 5 Metres North West of Leapingwell's Farmhouse	II	Hollow Road			29 July 1988	TL8422819054; 51°50′23″N 0°40′22″E		1337628	Upload Photo	Q26622025
Felix Hall	II	Hollow Road			10 April 1987	TL8465519483; 51°50′36″N 0°40′45″E		1123797	Upload Photo	Q26416892
Leapingwell's Farmhouse	II	Hollow Road			29 July 1988	TL8423419041; 51°50′22″N 0°40′22″E		1305774	Upload Photo	Q26592607
Park Farmhouse	II	Hollow Road			29 July 1988	TL8513519003; 51°50′20″N 0°41′09″E		1123798	Upload Photo	Q26416894
Porter's Farmhouse	II	Hollow Road			29 July 1988	TL8339019270; 51°50′31″N 0°39′39″E		1171011	Upload Photo	Q26464731
Rook Hall	II	Hollow Road			29 July 1988	TL8399419331; 51°50′32″N 0°40′10″E		1170991	Upload Photo	Q26464708
The Clock House	II	Hollow Road			24 March 1988	TL8462819547; 51°50′38″N 0°40′44″E		1305802	Upload Photo	Q26592634
The Orangery	II	Hollow Road			29 July 1988	TL8464019511; 51°50′37″N 0°40′44″E		1337627	Upload Photo	Q26622024
1 and 3 London Road	II	1 and 3, London Road, CO5 9AP			25 June 1974	TL8592618317; 51°49′57″N 0°41′49″E		1171069	Upload Photo	Q26464830
Ancillary Building 25 Metres West of Church Hall Farmhouse	II	London Road			29 July 1988	TL8561218279; 51°49′56″N 0°41′33″E		1123801	Upload Photo	Q26416897
Barn 65 Metres North West of Church Hall Farmhouse	II	London Road			21 December 1967	TL8558818310; 51°49′57″N 0°41′32″E		1171056	Upload Photo	Q26464808
Church Hall Farmhouse	II	London Road			2 May 1953	TL8565118268; 51°49′56″N 0°41′35″E		1171035	Upload Photo	Q26464773
Granary/cottage 40 Metres North of Church Hall Farmhouse	II	London Road			29 July 1988	TL8566018312; 51°49′57″N 0°41′35″E		1337629	Upload Photo	Q26622026
Hole Farmhouse	II*	London Road			29 July 1988	TL8484017216; 51°49′23″N 0°40′50″E		1123803	Upload Photo	Q17557390
St Osyth Cottage	II	London Road			25 June 1974	TL8593718324; 51°49′57″N 0°41′50″E		1123802	Upload Photo	Q26416898
The Old School House	II	1, Maldon Road			25 June 1974	TL8597818315; 51°49′57″N 0°41′52″E		1171082	Upload Photo	Q26464853
Ancillary Building 5 Metres South East of Bridgefoot Farmhouse	II	Maldon Road			29 July 1988	TL8611318027; 51°49′47″N 0°41′58″E		1123766	Upload Photo	Q26416863
Barn 10 Metres West of Grey's Cottage	II	Maldon Road			29 July 1988	TL8609218262; 51°49′55″N 0°41′58″E		1123805	Upload Photo	Q26416900
Bridgefoot House	II*	Maldon Road			2 May 1953	TL8611718055; 51°49′48″N 0°41′59″E		1337648	Upload Photo	Q17557824
County Library and Local History Museum	II	Maldon Road			25 June 1974	TL8598018286; 51°49′56″N 0°41′52″E		1123804	Upload Photo	Q26416899
Grey's Mill	II	Maldon Road			25 June 1974	TL8609818210; 51°49′53″N 0°41′58″E		1123806	Upload Photo	Q26416901
Greys East the Greys	II	Maldon Road			25 June 1974	TL8607618233; 51°49′54″N 0°41′57″E		1171108	Upload Photo	Q26464900
Little Greys	II	Maldon Road			25 June 1974	TL8602718241; 51°49′54″N 0°41′54″E		1171089	Upload Photo	Q26464868
Road Bridge Over River Blackwater	II	Maldon Road			29 July 1988	TL8607518098; 51°49′50″N 0°41′57″E		1337630	Upload Photo	Q26622027
Monk's Farm Cottages	II	Pantlings Lane			31 May 1985	TL8519620251; 51°51′00″N 0°41′15″E		1171147	Upload Photo	Q26464973
Fabia	II	St Marys Square			25 June 1974	TL8595818366; 51°49′59″N 0°41′51″E		1123768	Upload Photo	Q26416865
Joyes Lavenders	II	St Marys Square			25 June 1974	TL8594518338; 51°49′58″N 0°41′50″E		1171208	Upload Photo	Q26465048
Newman's	II	St Marys Square			25 June 1974	TL8592018374; 51°49′59″N 0°41′49″E		1171166	Upload Photo	Q26464997
Rosary Cottage and Shop Adjoining to North East	II	St Marys Square			25 June 1974	TL8592418364; 51°49′59″N 0°41′49″E		1337649	Upload Photo	Q26622044
St Mary's House	II*	St Marys Square	house		25 June 1974	TL8595218377; 51°49′59″N 0°41′51″E		1305733	St Mary's House More images	Q17557710
Top House	II	St Marys Square			25 June 1974	TL8591418380; 51°49′59″N 0°41′49″E		1123767	Upload Photo	Q26416864
The Old Cottage	II	1, Swan Street, CO5 9NG			21 December 1967	TL8651219157; 51°50′24″N 0°42′21″E		1337650	Upload Photo	Q26622045
3, Swan Street	II	3, Swan Street			21 December 1967	TL8658219119; 51°50′22″N 0°42′25″E		1123769	Upload Photo	Q26416866
Easterford Mill	II*	Swan Street	mill		21 December 1967	TL8669419069; 51°50′20″N 0°42′31″E		1171251	Easterford Mill More images	Q17557665
Easterford Mill House	II	Swan Street			21 December 1967	TL8668419055; 51°50′20″N 0°42′30″E		1337651	Upload Photo	Q26622046
The Old Bridge House	II	Swan Street			21 December 1967	TL8657419125; 51°50′22″N 0°42′25″E		1171223	Upload Photo	Q26465067
1, the Chase	II	1, The Chase			29 July 1988	TL8612818747; 51°50′11″N 0°42′01″E		1123845	Upload Photo	Q26416934

== See also ==
- Grade I listed buildings in Essex
- Grade II* listed buildings in Essex

== Sources ==
- Bettley, James; Pevsner, Nikolaus (2007) [1954], Essex, The Buildings of England, New Haven and London: Yale University Press, ISBN 978-0-300-11614-4
