= All Saints Church, Springfield =

Church in Chelmsford, Essex, England

Coordinates: 51.7442°N 0.489266°E

All Saints' Church, Springfield
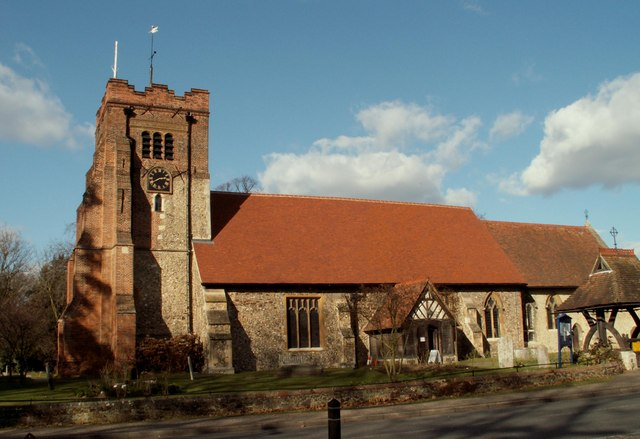

- Location in Essex
- OS grid reference: TL 71951 07986
- Location: Springfield, Essex
- Country: England
- Denomination: Anglican
- Website: All Saints', Springfield

Architecture
- Heritage designation: Grade II*
- Designated: 20 May 1949
- Architectural type: Church
- Style: Gothic

All Saints Church, Springfield is an Anglican church in Springfield, Essex.The first record of a church in the parish was in the Domesday Book in 1086.
