= Grade II* listed buildings in Southend-on-Sea =

There are over 20,000 Grade II* listed buildings in England. This page is a list of these buildings in the unitary authority of Southend-on-Sea in Essex.

== Southend-on-Sea ==
Name	Location	Type	Completed (Note: The date given is the date used by Historic England as significant for the initial building or that of an important part in the structure's description.)	Date designated	Grid ref. (Note: Sometimes known as OSGB36, the grid reference is based on the British national grid reference system used by the Ordnance Survey.) Geo-coordinates	Entry number (Note: The "List Entry Number" is a unique number assigned to each listed building and scheduled monument by Historic England.)	Image
St Clement's Church	Leigh on Sea, Southend-on-Sea	Parish Church	c. 1500	23 November 1951	TQ8415785832; 51°32′29″N 0°39′15″E	1322326	St Clement's Church More images
Church of St Andrew	South Shoebury	Parish Church	12th century	23 November 1951	TQ9294384599; 51°31′38″N 0°46′48″E	1322327	Church of St Andrew More images
Church of St Mary the Virgin	North Shoebury	Church	13th century	23 November 1951	TQ9291986144; 51°32′28″N 0°46′50″E	1112716	Church of St Mary the Virgin More images
Church of the Holy Trinity	Southchurch	Parish Church	13th century	23 November 1971	TQ9016986104; 51°32′30″N 0°44′27″E	1112723	Church of the Holy Trinity More images
Manor House	South Shoebury	House	1681	23 August 1974	TQ9467285590; 51°32′08″N 0°48′20″E	1306855	Manor House More images
Southend-on-Sea War Memorial	Southend-on-Sea	War memorial	1921	23 August 1974	TQ9467285590; 51°32′05″N 0°42′18″E	1322329	Southend-on-Sea War Memorial More images
