= Grade II* listed buildings in Harlow =

There are over 20,000 Grade II* listed buildings in England. This page is a list of these buildings in the district of Harlow in Essex.

== Harlow ==
Name	Location	Type	Completed (Note: The date given is the date used by Historic England as significant for the initial building or that of an important part in the structure's description.)	Date designated	Grid ref. (Note: Sometimes known as OSGB36, the grid reference is based on the British national grid reference system used by the Ordnance Survey.) Geo-coordinates	Entry number (Note: The "List Entry Number" is a unique number assigned to each listed building and scheduled monument by Historic England.)	Image
Barn East of Netteswellbury House	Netteswellbury, Harlow	Barn	c. 1440	5 July 1950	TL4556509356; 51°45′50″N 0°06′29″E	1337041	Upload Photo
Coppins	Latton, Harlow	House	16th century	19 June 1981	TL4667409606; 51°45′57″N 0°07′27″E	1169716	Upload Photo
Mulberry Green House and Stables	Mulberry Green, Harlow	House	Late 18th century	5 July 1950	TL4780111534; 51°46′59″N 0°08′29″E	1111689	Mulberry Green House and Stables More images
Hill House	Mulberry Green, Harlow	House	18th century	5 July 1950	TL4782411555; 51°46′59″N 0°08′30″E	1337039	Upload Photo
Kingsmoor House	Paringdon Rd, Harlow	House	18th century	19 June 1981	TL4388607717; 51°44′59″N 0°04′59″E	1337043	Upload Photo
Old House	Roydon Rd, Harlow	Timber Framed House	c. 1600	5 July 1950	TL4205910181; 51°46′20″N 0°03′27″E	1169770	Upload Photo
The Gables	Fore St, Harlow	Cross Wing House	15th century	5 July 1950	TL4718211544; 51°47′00″N 0°07′56″E	1169233	The Gables More images
The Queen's Head Public House	Harlow	Jettied House	Early 16th century	5 July 1950	TL4831011445; 51°46′55″N 0°08′55″E	1111700	The Queen's Head Public House More images
Roman Catholic Church of Our Lady of Fatima	Howard Way, Harlow	Church	1960	20 December 2000	TL457108; 51°46′37″N 0°06′40″E	1246733	Roman Catholic Church of Our Lady of Fatima More images
