= Grade II* listed buildings in Essex =

Essex shown within England

The county of Essex is divided into 14 districts. The districts of Essex are Harlow, Epping Forest, Brentwood, Basildon, Castle Point, Rochford, Maldon, Chelmsford, Uttlesford, Braintree, Colchester, Tendring, Thurrock, and Southend-on-Sea.

As there are 771 Grade II* listed buildings in the county they have been split into separate lists for each district.

- Grade II* listed buildings in Basildon (district)
- Grade II* listed buildings in Braintree (district)
- Grade II* listed buildings in Brentwood (borough)
- Grade II* listed buildings in Castle Point
- Grade II* listed buildings in the City of Chelmsford
- Grade II* listed buildings in Colchester (borough)
- Grade II* listed buildings in Epping Forest (district)
- Grade II* listed buildings in Harlow
- Grade II* listed buildings in Maldon (district)
- Grade II* listed buildings in Rochford (district)
- Grade II* listed buildings in Southend-on-Sea
- Grade II* listed buildings in Tendring
- Grade II* listed buildings in Thurrock
- Grade II* listed buildings in Uttlesford

== See also ==
- Grade I listed buildings in Essex
- Category:Grade II* listed buildings in Essex
