= Grade II* listed buildings in Thurrock =

There are over 20,000 Grade II* listed buildings in England. This page is a list of these buildings in the district of Thurrock in Essex.

== Thurrock ==
Name	Location	Type	Completed (Note: The date given is the date used by Historic England as significant for the initial building or that of an important part in the structure's description.)	Date designated	Grid ref. (Note: The grid reference is based on the British national grid reference system, sometimes known as OSGB36, used by the Ordnance Survey.) Geo-coordinates	Entry number (Note: The "List Entry Number" is a unique number assigned to each listed building and scheduled monument by Historic England.)	Image
Kenningtons	Aveley, Thurrock	House	Later	8 February 1960	TQ5629781745; 51°30′47″N 0°15′04″E	1147634	Kenningtons
Bretts Farmhouse	Aveley	Farmhouse	Late 14th century or early 15th century	8 February 1960	TQ5598881957; 51°30′54″N 0°14′48″E	1111561	Bretts Farmhouse
Church of St John the Baptist	Mucking	Church	13th century	8 February 1960	TQ6853081182; 51°30′16″N 0°25′37″E	1337106	Church of St John the Baptist More images
Church of St Mary and All Saints	Langdon Hills	Church	Early 16th century	28 August 1981	TQ6728086342; 51°33′04″N 0°24′41″E	1337108	Church of St Mary and All Saints More images
Church of St Mary the Virgin	Little Thurrock	Church	12th century	8 February 1960	TQ6262777792; 51°28′33″N 0°20′25″E	1111628	Church of St Mary the Virgin More images
Copeland House	Fobbing	A Frame House	14th century	8 February 1960	TQ7167684152; 51°31′49″N 0°28′25″E	1337112	Copeland House
Garden Walls and Gateway at Little Belhus	South Ockendon	Gate	Mid 16th century	8 February 1960	TQ5852282186; 51°30′59″N 0°17′00″E	1111580	Garden Walls and Gateway at Little Belhus
Bell Inn	Horndon on the Hill	Jettied House	Late 14th century	8 February 1960	TQ6703483265; 51°31′25″N 0°24′23″E	1337114	Bell Inn More images
High House	Horndon on the Hill	House	Early 18th century	8 February 1960	TQ6700583304; 51°31′26″N 0°24′21″E	1308738	High House More images
Little Belhus	South Ockendon	Timber Framed House	Mid 16th century	8 February 1960	TQ5851082154; 51°30′58″N 0°16′59″E	1147262	Little Belhus
Marshall's Cottages	West Tilbury	Cross Wing House	Early 15th century	8 February 1960	TQ6606378225; 51°28′43″N 0°23′24″E	1337058	Marshall's Cottages
Officers Barracks, Tilbury Fort	Tilbury	Back to Back House	1772	8 July 1998	TQ6515475336; 51°27′11″N 0°22′32″E	1375568	Officers Barracks, Tilbury Fort More images
Old Plough House	Bulphan	House	16th century	8 February 1960	TQ6421686435; 51°33′10″N 0°22′02″E	1337059	Old Plough House
Orsett House	Orsett	House	Early to mid 18th century	8 February 1960	TQ6397681975; 51°30′46″N 0°21′42″E	1111610	Orsett House
Purfleet Play Centre and Attached Wall to South	Purfleet	Boundary Wall	Mid 1760s	17 April 2009	TQ5491878592; 51°29′06″N 0°13′47″E	1393264	Purfleet Play Centre and Attached Wall to South
Riverside Station (including Floating Landing Stage)	Tilbury	Railway Station	1924	28 December 1989	TQ6438875132; 51°27′05″N 0°21′52″E	1111547	Riverside Station (including Floating Landing Stage) More images
St Clere's Hall	Mucking	Farmhouse	Late 17th century	8 February 1960	TQ6752981966; 51°30′42″N 0°24′46″E	1111565	St Clere's Hall
State Cinema	Grays	Shop	1938	22 February 1985	TQ6134077960; 51°28′39″N 0°19′19″E	1111543	State Cinema More images
Church of St James	West Tilbury	Former Church	Late 11th century or early 12th century	8 February 1960	TQ6613677704; 51°28′26″N 0°23′27″E	1111541	Church of St James More images
